= List of UWF Fury Hour episodes =

UWF Fury Hour was an American professional wrestling television program that premiered October 1, 1990 on SportsChannel America, then moved to Prime Ticket as UWF Thunder Hour in 1992.

ESPN2 repackaged existing SportsChannel America and Prime Ticket episodes into a half-hour format in 1995.

Todd Okerlund's Classic Wrestling repackaged some of the UWF library into In Demand pay-per-view events between 2002 and 2004.

== Episode Guide ==
=== SportsChannel America (1990-1991) ===
No.	Original air date	Main event	Venue	City	Filming Date
1	October 1, 1990	Brian Blair vs. Dan Spivey	Reseda Country Club	Reseda, California	September 24, 1990
2	October 8, 1990	Billy Jack Haynes vs. Col. DeBeers	Reseda Country Club	Reseda, California	September 24, 1990
3	October 15, 1990	Paul Orndorff vs. Steve Williams	Reseda Country Club	Reseda, California	September 24, 1990
4	October 22, 1990	Bob Orton, Jr. vs. Paul Orndorff	Reseda Country Club	Reseda, California	October 11, 1990
5	October 29, 1990	Ivan Koloff vs. Nikita Koloff	Reseda Country Club	Reseda, California	October 11, 1990
6	November 5, 1990	Billy Jack Haynes vs. Ken Patera	Reseda Country Club	Reseda, California	October 11, 1990
7	November 12, 1990	Billy Jack Haynes vs. Col. DeBeers	Reseda Country Club	Reseda, California	November 11, 1990
8	November 19, 1990	Ken Patera vs. Nikita Koloff	Reseda Country Club	Reseda, California	November 11, 1990
9	November 26, 1990	Cactus Jack and Jack Armstrong vs. David Sammartino and Jay Strongbow, Jr.	Reseda Country Club	Reseda, California	November 11, 1990
10	December 3, 1990	Rerun			
11	December 10, 1990	Cactus Jack vs. Jay Strongbow, Jr.	Reseda Country Club	Reseda, California	December 6, 1990
12	December 17, 1990	Col. DeBeers vs. Louie Spicolli	Reseda Country Club	Reseda, California	December 6, 1990
13	December 24, 1990	Rerun			
14	December 31, 1990	Cactus Jack vs. Don Muraco	Reseda Country Club	Reseda, California	December 6, 1990
15	January 7, 1991	Ivan Koloff vs. Steve Ray	Reseda Country Club	Reseda, California	December 6, 1990
16	January 14, 1991	Ivan Koloff vs. Steve Ray	New York Penta	New York City, New York	January 9, 1991
17	January 21, 1991	Col. DeBeers vs. King Parsons	New York Penta	New York City, New York	January 9, 1991
18	January 28, 1991	Paul Orndorff vs. Steve Williams	New York Penta	New York City, New York	January 9, 1991
19	February 4, 1991	Rerun			
20	February 11, 1991	Barry O vs. Jay Strongbow, Jr. (taped 12/6/1990)	Various		
21	February 18, 1991	Rerun			
22	February 25, 1991	Cactus Jack vs. Don Muraco	New York Penta	New York City, New York	February 15, 1991
23	March 4, 1991	Bob Orton, Jr. vs. Brian Blair	New York Penta	New York City, New York	February 15, 1991
24	March 11, 1991	Chris Michaels and Tom Brandi vs. The Power Twins	New York Penta	New York City, New York	February 15, 1991
25	March 18, 1991	Bob Orton, Jr. and Cactus Jack vs. Steve Ray and Sunny Beach	New York Penta	New York City, New York	February 15, 1991
26	March 25, 1991	Rerun			
27	April 1, 1991	Bam Bam Bigelow vs. Bob Orton, Jr.	New York Penta	New York City, New York	March 10, 1991
28	April 8, 1991	Bob Orton, Jr. and Cactus Jack vs. Steve Ray and Sunny Beach	New York Penta	New York City, New York	March 10, 1991
29	April 15, 1991	Paul Orndorff vs. Steve Williams (Steel Cage Match)	New York Penta	New York City, New York	March 10, 1991
30	April 22, 1991	Don Muraco vs. Terry Gordy	New York Penta	New York City, New York	March 10, 1991
31	April 29, 1991	Boris Zhukov vs. Vern Henderson	Universal Studios Florida	Orlando, Florida	April 7, 1991
32	May 6, 1991	Steve Ray vs. The Power Twins	Universal Studios Florida	Orlando, Florida	April 7, 1991
33	May 13, 1991	Bam Bam Bigelow vs. Bob Orton, Jr.	Universal Studios Florida	Orlando, Florida	April 7, 1991
34	May 20, 1991	Bam Bam Bigelow, Brian Blair and Paul Orndorff vs. Bob Orton, Jr., Boris Zhukov and Rusty Brooks	Universal Studios Florida	Orlando, Florida	April 7, 1991
35	May 27, 1991	Bam Bam Bigelow vs. Cactus Jack	New York Penta	New York City, New York	May 10, 1991
36	June 3, 1991	Nikolai Volkoff vs. The Beast	New York Penta	New York City, New York	May 10, 1991
37	June 10, 1991	Brian Blair vs. Mike Williams (taped 1/14/1991)	New York Penta	New York City, New York	May 10, 1991
38	June 17, 1991	The Killer Bees vs. The Power Twins (Beach Brawl)	Manatee Civic Center	Palmetto, Florida	June 9, 1991
39	June 24, 1991	Bob Orton, Jr. and Cactus Jack vs. Steve Ray and Sunny Beach (Beach Brawl)	Manatee Civic Center	Palmetto, Florida	June 9, 1991
40	July 1, 1991	Bob Backlund vs. Ivan Koloff (Beach Brawl)	Manatee Civic Center	Palmetto, Florida	June 9, 1991
41	July 8, 1991	Cash Jackson and Hog Calhoun vs. The Killer Bees (taped 5/10/1991)	Manatee Civic Center	Palmetto, Florida	June 9, 1991
42	July 15, 1991	Bam Bam Bigelow vs. Steve Williams (Highlights) (Beach Brawl)	Manatee Civic Center	Palmetto, Florida	Highlights - Various
43	July 22, 1991	Candi Devine vs. Rockin' Robin (Beach Brawl)	Manatee Civic Center	Palmetto, Florida	June 9, 1991
44	July 29, 1991	Rerun			
45	August 5, 1991	Rerun			
46	August 12, 1991	Bob Orton, Jr. vs. Paul Orndorff	War Memorial Auditorium	Fort Lauderdale, Florida	July 20, 1991
47	August 19, 1991	To the Point: with Bruno Sammartino, Herb Abrams and Lou Albano	War Memorial Auditorium	Fort Lauderdale, Florida	July 20, 1991
48	August 26, 1991	Allison Royal vs. Luna Vachon	War Memorial Auditorium	Fort Lauderdale, Florida	July 20, 1991
49	September 2, 1991	The Blackhearts vs. Fire Cat and Steve Ray	War Memorial Auditorium	Fort Lauderdale, Florida	July 20, 1991
50	September 9, 1991	To the Point: with Mr. Red, Super Ninja, Herb Abrams and Lou Albano	War Memorial Auditorium	Fort Lauderdale, Florida	July 20, 1991
51	September 16, 1991	Leilani Kai vs. Wendi Richter (Wild Women of Wrestling)	War Memorial Auditorium	Fort Lauderdale, Florida	April 20, 1990
52	September 23, 1991	Battle Royal (Wild Women of Wrestling)	War Memorial Auditorium	Fort Lauderdale, Florida	April 20, 1990

=== Prime Ticket (1992) ===
No.	Original air date	Main event	Venue	City	Filming Date
53	July 5, 1992	Johnny Kidd and Mike Meyers vs. Steve Ray and Sunny Beach	Spartanburg Memorial Auditorium	Spartanburg, South Carolina	June 19, 1992
54	July 12, 1992	Helmut Hessler vs. Jeff Husker	Spartanburg Memorial Auditorium	Spartanburg, South Carolina	June 19, 1992
55	July 19, 1992	Helmut Hessler vs. Steve Ray	Spartanburg Memorial Auditorium	Spartanburg, South Carolina	June 19, 1992
56	July 26, 1992	Ivan Koloff vs. Jimmy Valiant	Spartanburg Memorial Auditorium	Spartanburg, South Carolina	June 19, 1992
57	August 2, 1992	Bob Orton, Jr. vs. Paul Orndorff	Spartanburg Memorial Auditorium	Spartanburg, South Carolina	June 19, 1992
58	August 9, 1992	Best of Paul "Mr. Wonderful" Orndorff (released on VHS 7/1/1992)	Various		
59	August 16, 1992	The Steel Cage Match (released on VHS 7/1/1992)	Various		
60	August 23, 1992	Tag Team Tandems (released on VHS 7/1/1992)	Various		
61	August 30, 1992	Wrestling's Greatest Champions (released on VHS 7/1/1992)	Various		
62	September 6, 1992	The Lumberjack Match (released on VHS 8/1/1992)	Various		
63	September 13, 1992	Wildest Matches	Various		
64	September 20, 1992	Bambi vs. Judy Martin (Wild Women of Wrestling)	War Memorial Auditorium	Fort Lauderdale, Florida	April 20, 1990
65	September 27, 1992	Babyface Nellie vs. Candi Devine (Wild Women of Wrestling)	War Memorial Auditorium	Fort Lauderdale, Florida	April 20, 1990
66	October 4, 1992	Sizzle Reel shown at NATPE Conference in January 1991 and January 1992	Reseda Country Club	Reseda, California	Various
67	October 11, 1992	Rerun			
68	October 21, 1992	Rerun			
69	October 25, 1992	Rerun			

=== ESPN2 (1995) ===
No.	Original air date	Main event	Venue	City	Filming Date
1	March 1, 1995	Ivan Koloff vs. Nikita Koloff	Reseda Country Club	Reseda, California	October 11, 1990
2	March 2, 1995	Cactus Jack vs. David Sammartino	Reseda Country Club	Reseda, California	September 24, 1990
3	March 3, 1995	Brian Blair vs. Dan Spivey	Reseda Country Club	Reseda, California	September 24, 1990
4	March 6, 1995	Jimmy Valiant vs. Viper II	Spartanburg Memorial Auditorium	Spartanburg, South Carolina	June 19, 1992
5	March 7, 1995	Johnny Kidd and Mike Myers vs. Steve Ray and Sunny Beach	Spartanburg Memorial Auditorium	Spartanburg, South Carolina	June 19, 1992
6	March 8, 1995	Col. DeBeers vs. David Sammartino	Reseda Country Club	Reseda, California	September 24, 1990
7	March 9, 1995	Paul Orndorff vs. Steve Williams	Reseda Country Club	Reseda, California	September 24, 1990
8	March 10, 1995	Ivan Koloff vs. Steve Ray	Reseda Country Club	Reseda, California	December 6, 1990
9	March 13, 1995	Bam Bam Bigelow, Brian Blair and Paul Orndorff vs. Bob Orton, Jr., Boris Zhukov and Rusty Brooks	Universal Studios Florida	Orlando, Florida	April 7, 1991
10	March 14, 1995	David Sammartino vs. Ivan Koloff	New York Penta	New York City, New York	January 9, 1991
11	March 15, 1995	Col. DeBeers vs. Louie Spicolli	Reseda Country Club	Reseda, California	December 6, 1990
12	March 16, 1995	Brian Blair vs. Louie Spicolli	Reseda Country Club	Reseda, California	November 11, 1990
13	March 17, 1995	Billy Jack Haynes vs. Col. DeBeers	Reseda Country Club	Reseda, California	November 11, 1990
14	March 20, 1995	Pez Whatley vs. Vladimir Koloff	Spartanburg Memorial Auditorium	Spartanburg, South Carolina	June 19, 1992
15	March 21, 1995	The Killer Bees vs. The Power Twins (Beach Brawl)	Manatee Civic Center	Palmetto, Florida	June 9, 1991
16	March 22, 1995	Paul Orndorff vs. Spitball Patterson	Reseda Country Club	Reseda, California	November 11, 1990
17	March 23, 1995	Col. DeBeers vs. King Parsons	New York Penta	New York City, New York	January 9, 1991
18	March 24, 1995	Bob Orton, Jr. vs. Brian Blair	New York Penta	New York City, New York	February 15, 1991
19	March 27, 1995	The Blackhearts vs. Fire Cat and Steve Ray	War Memorial Auditorium	Fort Lauderdale, Florida	July 20, 1991
20	March 28, 1995	Paul Orndorff vs. Steve Williams	New York Penta	New York City, New York	January 9, 1991
21	March 29, 1995	Ivan Koloff vs. Steve Ray	New York Penta	New York City, New York	January 9, 1991
22	March 30, 1995	Paul Orndorff vs. Steve Williams (Lumberjack Match)	New York Penta	New York City, New York	February 15, 1991
23	March 31, 1995	Cactus Jack vs. Don Muraco	New York Penta	New York City, New York	February 15, 1991
24	April 3, 1995	Helmut Hessler vs. Steve Ray	Spartanburg Memorial Auditorium	Spartanburg, South Carolina	June 19, 1992

=== In Demand (2002-2004) ===
No.	Release date	Title	Venue	City	Filming Date
1	June 2002	The Best of Blackjack Brawl	MGM Grand Garden Arena	Paradise, Nevada	September 23, 1994
2	March 2003	The Best of Beach Brawl	Manatee Civic Center	Palmetto, Florida	June 9, 1991
3	May 2004	Blood, Sweat & Bruises	Various		
4	September 2004	Turnbuckle Turmoil (Beach Brawl)	Manatee Civic Center	Palmetto, Florida	June 9, 1991

== See also ==
- UWF Beach Brawl
- UWF Blackjack Brawl
