= List of former Universal Wrestling Federation (Herb Abrams) personnel =

Universal Wrestling Federation (UWF) was a professional wrestling promotion based in Marina del Rey, California from 1990 to 1996. Former employees in the UWF consisted of professional wrestlers, managers, play-by-play and color commentators, announcers, interviewers and referees.

Deceased individuals are indicated with a dagger (†).

== Alumni ==
=== Male wrestlers ===
Birth name:	Ring name(s):	Tenure:
Michael Alegado	King Kaluha	1991
Marcelino Rivera Alicea	Jose Luis Rivera	1991
Michael Allen	Michael Allen	1990
Richard Allen	Sunny Beach	1991–1992, 1994
Billy Anderson	The Black Knight	1990–1991
Afa Anoaʻi ^{†}	Wild Samoan Afa	1991
Bob Backlund	Bob Backlund	1991
Thomas Barrett	Tommy Angel	1992
John Batts	Johnny B. Goode	1991
Scott Bigelow ^{†}	Bam Bam Bigelow	1991
B. Brian Blair	Brian Blair / B. Brian Blair	1990–1991, 1993–1994
Greg Boyd	Mr. Black / The Myth	1991
Howard Brackney ^{†}	Super Ninja	1991
Tom Brandi	Tom Brandi	1991
Jim Brunzell	Jim Brunzell	1991, 1993–1994
Alvin Burke, Jr.	Dr. Feelgood / Mr. Outrageous Al Burke	1993–1994
Kevin Canady	Mad Man Pondo	1991
David Canal	Dave Sierra / Cuban Assassin	1991
Todd Christy	Todd Becker	1993
Bryan Clark	The Nightstalker	1992
Chuck Coats ^{†}	Helmut Hessler	1992
Stephan DeLeon ^{†}	The Blue Knight / Stephen DeLeon	1990
Tony DeMura	Tony Capone	1991
Joe DiFuria	Joe DeFuria	1991
Tim Dodson	Spitball Patterson / The Bounty Hunter	1990
Briam Donahue	Brian Donahue	1991
Mike Durham ^{†}	Mike Durham / The Beast / Equalizer Zap	1991
Conrad Efraim ^{†}	S. D. Jones	1991
Matthew Efstathiou	Matt Starr	1990
José Estrada, Sr.	José Estrada, Sr.	1991
Sid Eudy ^{†}	Sid Vicious	1994
Don Factor	Jay Strongbow Jr.	1990
James Fanning	Jimmy Valiant	1992
Brett Farrell	Jake Steele	1992
Roy Wayne Farris	The Honky Tonk Man	1991
Mick Foley	Cactus Jack	1990–1991, 1994
Spiros Gekko	Rico Federico	1991
Terry Gordy ^{†}	Terry Gordy	1991
Randall Gust	Randy Gusto	1993
Tony Halme ^{†}	Finland Hellraiser Thor / The Viking	1990, 1994
Jim Harrell	Boris Zhukov	1991
William Haynes Jr.	Billy Jack Haynes	1990
David Heath	Blackheart Destruction	1991
Vern Henderson	Big V	1991
Barry Horowitz	Barry Horowitz	1991–1992
David Isley	Viper II	1992
Dave Johnson ^{†}	Dave Johnson / Blackheart Devastation	1991, 1993
Daryl Karolat	Tyler Mane	1994
Kurt Koski ^{†}	Rusty Brooks	1991
John Laurinaitis	Johnny Ace	1991, 1994
Armando Llanes	Mando Guerrero	1994
Larry Ludden	Larry Ludden	1990
Jayson Maples	Blaze Bigelow	1991
Jack Martin	Hog Calhoun	1991
Steven May	Steve Ray / Wild Thing	1990–1994
Ken McBride ^{†}	Muhammad the Butcher	1991
Mike Meyers	Stone Cold / Stone Cole	1992
Adam Michaels	Davey Meltzer	1990
Loren Miyake	Riki Ataki	1990
Louis Mucciolo, Jr. ^{†}	Louie Spicolli	1990–1991
Don Muraco	Don Muraco	1990–1991
Tom Nash	Blackheart Apocalypse	1991, 1993
Paul Orndorff ^{†}	Paul Orndorff	1990–1992
Lenny Ornstein	Wildman Jack Armstrong	1990, 1994
Bob Orton, Jr.	Bob Orton, Jr.	1990–1994
Randal Barry Orton ^{†}	Barry O	1990
King Parsons	Iceman Parsons	1990–1991
Ken Patera	Ken Patera	1990
Michael Penzel^{†}	Corporal Kirchner	1991
Oreal Perras ^{†}	Ivan Koloff	1990–1992
David Perry	Dave Perry	1991–1992
Josip Peruzović ^{†}	Nikolai Volkoff	1991
Dean Peters ^{†}	Fire Cat / Lynx	1991
Ted Petty ^{†}	The Cheetah Kid	1991
Bill Pierce	Chris Michaels	1991
Lanny Poffo ^{†}	Lanny Poffo	1991
John Richardson	The Intern	1990
Richard Erwin Rood ^{†}	Rick Rude	1991
André Roussimoff ^{†}	André the Giant	1990
Wendall Rozier ^{†}	Death Row #3260	1991–1992
David Sammartino	David Sammartino	1990–1991
Paul Samson	Paul Samson / Samson	1991, 1994
Michael Santoni Jr.	Mike Iorio	1991
Scott Schwartz	Joshua Ben-Gurion	1991
Mike Sharpe ^{†}	Mike Sharpe	1991
Nelson Simpson	Nikita Koloff	1990
Al Schaefer	Sonny Blaze	1991
Jimmy Snuka ^{†}	Jimmy Snuka	1994
David Sontag	Dave Power	1991
Larry Sontag	Larry Power / The Power Warrior	1991, 1994
Dan Spivey	Dan Spivey	1990, 1994
Carmine Surace	Carmine Albano	1991
Terry Szopinski	The Warlord	1993–1994
Michael Taylor	Johnny Kidd	1992
Mark Thomas	The Condor	1991
Mick Tierney	The Irish Assassin	1994
Ken Timbs ^{†}	The Marauder	1992
Pez Whatley ^{†}	Pez Whatley	1992
Lawrence Whistler	Larry Zbyszko	1990
Mike Williams	Mike Williams / Captain Badd	1991
Steve Williams ^{†}	Steve Williams	1990-1991, 1994
Robert Deroy Windham ^{†}	Blackjack Mulligan	1994
Edward Wiskoski	Colonel DeBeers	1990–1991
Jonathan Wisniski	Greg Valentine	1991
Dale Wolfe	Dusty Wolfe	1991
Unknown	Al Lion	1990
Unknown	The Black Russian	1991
Unknown	Bobby Bitman	1991
Unknown	The Bulldozer	1990
Unknown	Cash Jackson	1991
Unknown	Daytona Drake	1991
Unknown	Gary Keyes	1990
Unknown	The Grappler	1990
Unknown	Houdini	1990
Unknown	J.R. James	1991
Unknown	Jackknife Johnny	1991
Unknown	Jeff Husker	1992
Unknown	Jim Cooper	1991
Unknown	Jim the Animal	1991
Unknown	Jimmy Starr	1991
Unknown	Kevin Benjamin	1990
Unknown	Latin Lover	1991
Unknown	The Masked Marvel	1993
Unknown	The Mauler	1992
Unknown	The Messenger	1991
Unknown	Michael Moore	1990
Unknown	Midnight Star	1992
Unknown	Mike Conevo	1991
Unknown	Mike DeFuria	1991
Unknown	Mike Lauria	1991
Unknown	The Nightmare	1991
Unknown	The Patriot	1990
Unknown	Rob Allen / Robbie Allen	1990
Unknown	Scott Cole	1990
Unknown	Soul Train Phillips	1991
Unknown	Terry Cooley	1990
Unknown	Wrecking Crew	1991

=== Female wrestlers ===
Birth name:	Ring name(s):	Tenure:
Christine Arrant	Allison Royal	1991
Malia Hosaka	Malia Hosaka	1991
Jacqueline Moore	Miss Texas	1994
Lisa Moretti	Tina Moretti	1994
Kim Ollis-Sacks	Penelope Paradise	1991
Candace Rummel^{†}	Candi Devine	1991, 1994
Robin Smith	Rockin' Robin	1991
Gertrude Vachon^{†}	Luna Vachon	1991

=== Midget wrestlers ===
Birth name:	Ring name(s):	Tenure:
Shigeri Akabane ^{†}	Little Tokyo	1994
Christopher Dube	The Karate Kid	1994

=== Stables and tag teams ===
Tag team/Stable(s)	Members	Tenure(s)
The Blackhearts	Apocalypse and Destruction	1991
The Conquistadors	José Estrada Sr. and Jose Luis Rivera	1991
Mask Confusion	Jim Brunzell and B. Brian Blair	1991, 1994
The New Blackhearts	Apocalypse and Devastation	1993
The New Powers of Pain	The Warlord and The Power Warrior	1994
The Power Twins	David Power and Larry Power	1991
Wet 'n' Wild	Steve Ray and Sunny Beach	1991–1992

=== Managers and valets ===
Birth name:	Ring name(s):	Tenure:
Samula Anoa'i	Samu	1991
Rick Bassman	Rick Golden	1991
Greg Boyd	Mr. Black	1991
Kevin Casey	Kevin Casey	1992
Jeff Gardner	Abudadein	1991
Melissa Hiatt	Missy Hyatt	1994
Jean Andre Pamphile	Mr. Haiti	1991
Robert Pawlikowski ^{†}	Zoogz Rift	1993
Mike Rapuano	Bobby Rogers	1991
Toni Sabella	Honey / Honeybee	1990-1991
John Tolos ^{†}	John Tolos	1990–1991
Gertrude Vachon ^{†}	Luna Vachon	1991
Marty Yesberg	Colonel Red / Mr. Red	1991-1992
Unknown	Gorgeous John	1991

=== Commentators and interviewers ===
Birth name:	Ring name(s):	Tenure:	Notes
Herbert Abrams ^{†}	Herb Abrams	1990	Play-by-play commentator
Louis Albano ^{†}	Captain Lou Albano	1990-1991	Backstage interviewer
Charlie DeNatale	Carlo Gianelli	1993-1994	Play-by-play commentator
Craig Minervini	Craig DeGeorge	1990–1992	Play-by-play commentator
Bruno Sammartino ^{†}	Bruno Sammartino	1990–1991	Color commentator
John Tolos ^{†}	John Tolos	1992–1994	Color commentator

=== Other personnel ===
Birth name:	Ring name(s):	Tenure:	Notes
Herbert Abrams ^{†}	Herb Abrams	1990-1996	UWF Founder and Owner
John Arezzi	John Arezzi	1991	UWF New York Market Promoter
Howard Brody ^{†}	Howard Brody	1991	UWF Florida Market Promoter
Alvin Burke, Jr.	Al Burke	1994-1995	UWF Executive Vice President
Leonard Duge	Lenny Duge	1990-1992	UWF Executive Producer
Robert Pawlikowski ^{†}	Zoogz Rift	1993-1994, 1995–1996	UWF Executive Vice President

== See also ==
- Universal Wrestling Federation (Herb Abrams) championships
