= Beach Brawl =

1991 Universal Wrestling Federation pay-per-view event

- Promotion: Universal Wrestling Federation
- Date: June 9, 1991
- City: Palmetto, Florida
- Venue: Manatee Civic Center
- Attendance: 550

Pay-per-view chronology
← Previous; First	Next → N/A

Beach Brawl was the only live professional wrestling pay-per-view event produced by Herb Abrams' Universal Wrestling Federation (UWF). The event took place on June 9, 1991 at the Manatee Civic Center in Palmetto, Florida.

Eight professional wrestling matches were contested at the event. In the main event, Steve Williams defeated Bam Bam Bigelow to become the inaugural SportsChannel Television Champion in the finals of a sixteen-man tournament. The inaugural Women's World Champion was also crowned at the event as Rockin' Robin defeated Candi Devine to become the inaugural women's champion of the company. The event was widely considered a failure because of its extremely low attendance and pay-per-view buyrate of 0.10. Reportedly, there were only 70 tickets sold with the remainder of the crowd being papered according to the June 17, 1991 edition of the Wrestling Observer Newsletter.

== Event ==
Before the event aired live on pay-per-view, Boris Zhukov defeated Paul Samson in a dark match.

=== Preliminary matches ===
Other on-screen personnel
Role	Name
Commentators	Craig DeGeorge
Commentators	Bruno Sammartino
Interviewer	Brian Ricco

The opening match of the event was a tag team match pitting The Blackhearts (Apocalypse and Destruction) against Fire Cat and Jim Cooper. Blackhearts performed a bearhug and diving leg drop combination on Cooper for the win while Luna Vachon strangled Fire Cat.

A Street Fight was scheduled to take place between Don Muraco and Terry Gordy but Muraco suffered an injury and Johnny Ace substituted for him. The match ended in a double count-out after both men brawled with each other throughout the crowd.

Masked Confusion (Brian Blair and Jim Brunzell) took on The Power Twins (Larry and David Power). Near the end of the match, Brunzell tried to perform a sunset flip on David but David prevented it by holding the ropes and then Blair performed a sunset flip on David for the win.

Rockin' Robin took on Candi Devine for the inaugural Women's World Championship. Near the end of the match, Devine missed a charge at Robin in the corner and Robin rolled up Devine to pin her and win the title.

Paul Orndorff took on Colonel DeBeers in a Strap match. Near the end of the match, DeBeers tried to release himself by getting out of the strap wrangled around his neck by a back body drop but Orndoff countered that with a spike piledriver for the win. The match was followed by a Captain Lou's Corner interview segment hosted by Captain Lou Albano featuring The Blackhearts and Luna Vachon as his guests, but Albano said he disliked his guests, dropped the mic and left.

Bob Backlund took on Ivan Koloff. Backlund pinned Koloff with a roll-up for the win after hitting a back body drop to a charging Koloff.

The penultimate match of the event was a tag team match pitting Wet'N'Wild (Steve Ray and Sunny Beach) against Cactus Jack and Bob Orton, Jr. John Tolos was tossed into a shark cage suspended above the ring by Ray and Beach. Near the end of the match, Tolos interfered by throwing brass knuckles from the cage but they knocked out Jack, allowing Ray to pin him for the win.

=== Main event match ===
The main event was the final round match of a tournament for the inaugural SportsChannel Television Championship between Steve Williams and Bam Bam Bigelow. Williams powerslammed Bigelow to win the match and become the inaugural SportsChannel Television Champion.

== Reception ==
Beach Brawl was a major failure as it was only able to generate a crowd of 500 people at the 4000-seat Manatee Civic Center with a low buyrate of 0.10. The event also received negative reviews from critics. Arnold Furious of 411Mania gave the event a 5.0 rating out of 10, stating "most of the undercard is relatively inoffensive. I say “relatively” because the UWF was so bad at times that a passable show would be good by their standards. There were some UWF-isms creeping onto show though. The count out in the street fight is an obvious one but there are several completely non-competitive matches and their titles mean nothing. The booking never makes any sense."

Adam Nedeff of 411Mania gave a rating of 2.5 out of 10, citing "Underwhelming finishes (Tolos in the shark cage), nonsensical booking (Captain's Corner, the street fight, a seven-minute main event, Backlund squashing Koloff), and just-plain-disappointing matches."

== Aftermath ==
UWF did not produce any other pay-per-view events due to Beach Brawl being a massive failure, but they produced a major television special called Blackjack Brawl in 1994 that served as the promotion's final show.

== Results ==
No.	Results	Stipulations	Times
1^{D}	Boris Zhukov defeated Paul Samson	Singles match	—
2	The Blackhearts (Apocalypse and Destruction) (with Luna Vachon) defeated Fire Cat and Jim Cooper	Tag team match	07:45
3	Terry Gordy vs. Johnny Ace ended in a double countout	Street Fight	06:08
4	Masked Confusion (Brian Blair and Jim Brunzell) defeated The Power Twins (Larry and David Power)	Tag team match	12:23
5	Rockin' Robin defeated Candi Devine	Singles match for the inaugural UWF Women's World Championship	06:05
6	Paul Orndorff defeated Colonel DeBeers	Strap match	04:15
7	Bob Backlund defeated Ivan Koloff (with Mr. Red)	Singles match	02:23
8	Wet'N'Wild (Steve Ray and Sunny Beach) defeated Cactus Jack and Bob Orton, Jr. (with John Tolos)	Tag team match	04:02
9	Steve Williams defeated Bam Bam Bigelow	Tournament final for the inaugural UWF SportsChannel Television Championship	07:11
D / – this was a dark match

=== SportsChannel Television Championship tournament brackets ===
The tournament to determine the inaugural SportsChannel Television Champion began on April 7, 1991 and concluded with the tournament final at Beach Brawl. Pin-Pinfall; Sub-Submission; CO-Countout; DCO-Double countout; DQ-Disqualification; Ref-Referee's decision

First round
Steve Williams
Nikolai Volkoff
Steve Ray	DDQ
Samu
Terry Gordy
S. D. Jones
Don Muraco
Wild Samoan Afa
Cactus Jack
Sunny Beach
Bob Orton Jr.
B. Brian Blair
Colonel DeBeers
Iceman Parsons
Ivan Koloff
Bam Bam Bigelow

Quarterfinals
Steve Williams
Steve Ray
Terry Gordy
Don Muraco
Cactus Jack
B. Brian Blair
Colonel DeBeers
Bam Bam Bigelow

Semi-finals
Steve Williams
BYE
Cactus Jack
Bam Bam Bigelow

Final
Steve Williams	Pin
Bam Bam Bigelow	07:11

== See also ==
- UWF Blackjack Brawl
- UWF Fury Hour
