= Sunny Beach (wrestler) =

American professional wrestler and promoter

Personal information
- Born: Richard Allen; September 24, 1963 (age 63) Jacksonville, Florida, U.S.

Professional wrestling career
- Ring name(s): Sunny Beach; Sonny Beach; Sandy Beach; Rick Allen
- Billed height: 6 ft 4 in (1.93 m)
- Billed weight: 265 lb (120 kg)
- Billed from: Santa Monica, California, U.S. Surf City, California
- Debut: 1985
- Retired: 2000

Richard "Rick" Allen (born September 24, 1963), also known by the ring name Sunny Beach, is an American retired professional wrestler and promoter. He is perhaps best known for his tenure in the Universal Wrestling Federation where he was one-half of Wet N' Wild with Steve Ray.

As the promotion's top "babyface" tag team, Wet N' Wild battled Cactus Jack and Bob Orton Jr., led by manager "Coach" John Tolos, with their feud concluding at the company's first PPV event UWF Beach Brawl in 1991. He was also the final UWF SportsChannel Television Champion before the company folded.

Allen began his career in the World Wrestling Federation where he was a featured preliminary wrestler from 1988 to 1992. He had stints in other wrestling promotions including, most notably, the American Wrestling Federation, Global Wrestling Federation, International Championship Wrestling Alliance, International World Class Championship Wrestling and Stampede Wrestling. Allen also wrestled overseas for All Japan Pro Wrestling, the Americas Wrestling Federation and World Wrestling's Stars.

== Early life ==
Allen was born and raised in Jacksonville, Florida. He was active in high school sports, namely football and track and field, and began wrestling his sophomore year at Terry Parker High School. Allen was an all-city and all-state wrestling champion (1982–1983). He was also a member of the Fellowship of Christian Athletes. After graduation, Allen attended the Florida Community College at Jacksonville as a criminal justice major. He also attained an associate's degree in science at the University of North Florida. Allen reportedly worked as a lifeguard before entering pro wrestling.

== Professional wrestling career ==
=== Early Career (1985-1988) ===
In the spring of 1988, while preparing to enter the police academy of the Jacksonville Sheriff's Office, Allen had a minor role in the 1989 action film No Holds Barred starring Hulk Hogan. He gained the attention of the World Wrestling Federation during filming. Allen rejected football scholarships from Florida State and Georgia Southern University in order to start working for the company as a preliminary wrestler. He was trained at the famed Gleason's Gym alongside Jason Knight, Falcon Coperis, The Shark Attack Kid, Primo Carnera III and Tiger Khan. He worked for Southern Championship Wrestling in Georgia in early 1988.

=== World Wrestling Federation (1988) ===
Allen made his WWF debut on August 14, 1988, defeating The Gladiator at a house show in Athens, Alabama. He spent the next few weeks wrestling Scott Casey at live events in St. Joseph, Missouri, Canton, Ohio and Kittanning, Pennsylvania. Casey would remain one of Allen's most frequent opponents during his first year with the WWF. On September 10, he wrestled S. D. Jones at Reading Senior High School. Allen made his first WWF television appearance on the October 8th episode of WWF Superstars where he and Rusty Riddle took on The Rockers (Marty Jannetty and Shawn Michaels) at the Market Square Arena. Allen joined "Iron" Mike Sharpe on the October 16 episode of WWF Wrestling Challenge in a losing effort against The Young Stallions (Jim Powers and Paul Roma) at Louisville Gardens. Allen spent the rest of the month in bouts against Dave Peterson and Lanny Poffo. He also faced Casey at Madison Square Garden on the October 11 episode of WWF Prime Time Wrestling. On the October 29th episode of WWF Superstars, Allen once again took on The Rockers with tag team partner Brian Costello at the Allen County War Memorial Coliseum. He and Costello also wrestled The Powers of Pain (The Barbarian and The Warlord), accompanied by The Baron, the following week on WWF Wrestling Challenge. Allen's last WWF appearance was on October 10, 1988, against Jim Powers at Northlands Coliseum in Edmonton, Alberta.

=== Stampede Wrestling (1989) ===
Allen was befriended by The British Bulldogs while in the WWF and was brought to Calgary, along with Don Muraco, The Moondogs and The Power Twins (David Power and Larry Power), when they became the bookers for Stampede Wrestling. He made his Stampede debut on February 3, 1989, defeating Bucky Siegler. He received a title shot against Chris Benoit for the Stampede British Commonwealth Mid-Heavyweight Championship in Edmonton, Alberta the following night. Allen also teamed with Goldie Rogers for several matches against The Power Twins before returning to the U.S. after his two-week stint.

=== World Wrestling Federation (1989) ===
By the summer of 1989, Allen was back in the WWF as "Sandy Beach". On the July 30th episode of WWF Wrestling Challenge, Allen and The Gladiator lost to The Bushwhackers (Bushwhacker Butch and Bushwhacker Luke) at the Niagara Falls Convention Center. He also lost to Hillbilly Jim on the July 16 episode of WWF Wrestling Challenge. On the July 22nd episode of WWF Prime Time Wrestling, Allen and "Iron" Mike Sharpe faced Demolition (Demolition Ax and Demolition Smash) for the WWF World Tag Team Championship in Rochester, New York. The following week on WWF Prime Time Wrestling, Allen wrestled Paul Roma at Nassau Coliseum. On the August 5 episode of WWF Superstars, Allen and Boris Zhukov wrestled The Rockers at Worcester Centrum. He spent the rest of the summer in singles matches against King Duggan, Koko B. Ware and Ronnie Garvin. Allen also had matches against Hercules and Jose Luis Rivera in December 1989.

=== International Wrestling Association (1990) ===
Allen also established himself in regional promotions on the East Coast and Northeastern United States. He was one of the wrestlers recruited by promoters Rob Russen and Pete Lucic when they started the International Wrestling Association in Girard, Ohio. On August 27, 1990, Sunny Beach and The Terminator became the inaugural IWA Tag Team Champions after defeating The Motor City Madmen in Atlantic City, New Jersey. The team defended the belts until Sunny Beach left the promotion a month later and was replaced by Rage.

=== Universal Wrestling Federation (1991) ===
Allen joined the Universal Wrestling Federation in early 1991. He wrestled as "Sunny Beach", a "surfer boy" gimmick complete with a neon green wet suit and surfboard. Allen's first appearance on UWF television was on the January 28, 1991 episode of UWF Fury Hour, where he defeated Mike Williams. On the February 25 episode of UWF Fury Hour, at the Penta Hotel, Allen wrestled Bob Orton. Near the end of the bout, Orton's manager, "Coach" John Tolos, began attacking Allen while the referee was distracted and saw Steve Ray came to Allen's rescue. Cactus Jack followed Ray into the ring moments resulting in a four-way brawl. In the post-match interview, Tolos introduced Cactus Jack as the newest member of his stable and began a feud with the two young wrestlers lasting nearly three months.

The duo proved popular with the UWF audience, one of its few homegrown stars, and who quickly became the promotion's top "babyface" tag team. They had their first tag team match together on the March 4, 1991 episode of UWF Fury Hour against The Power Twins. The team was dubbed Wet N' Wild by Captain Lou Albano during an interview on "Capt. Lou's Corner" the following week. Allen and Ray finally met Bob Orton and Cactus Jack on the March 18 episode of UWF Fury Hour which ended in a time-limit draw. A rematch held the following week ended in a double-disqualification. On April 26, Allen lost to Cactus Jack in a no-disqualification match at Plainedge High School.

Coach Tolos also recruited The Power Twins in his war against Wet N' Wild. The two teams met at Universal Studios on the May 13 episode of UWF Fury Hour. Ray initially wrestled both twins in a handicap match as his partner was supposedly stranded at the airport. Allen later appeared in the ring while The Power Twins were double-teaming his partner and attacked them with his suitcase. In the post match interview, the team accused John Tolos of preventing Allen from arriving at the arena. Wet N' Wild later came to the rescue of Malia Hosaka when she was thrown out of the ring by The Blackhearts. On May 26, Allen served as a guest co-host on Pro Wrestling Spotlight, a WEVD radio program, with John Arezzi. In addition to taking live callers and discussing pro wrestling news, they also interviewed both former WWF Women's Champion The Fabulous Moolah and Allen's then rival Cactus Jack. On the June 3 episode of UWF Fury Hour, Wet N' Wild and The Power Twins fought to a double-disqualification at the Hotel Pennsylvania.

Allen and Ray's feud with Coach Tolos' stable was finally settled at UWF Beach Brawl, the promotion's first-ever PPV event, with Wet N' Wild defeating Bob Orton and Cactus Jack. Tolos was suspended in a cage over the ring to prevent the manager from interfering in the match. Cactus Jack, who was pinned by Allen, was blamed for the loss and attacked by Orton after the match. In spite of the PPVs failure, "Dr. Death" Steve Williams counted Allen among the most talented wrestlers on the card. Wet N' Wild were broken up shortly after due to personal issues between Ray and promoter Herb Abrams. Their last appearance on UWF television on the June 10 episode of UWF Fury Hour against Brian Donahue and The Messenger.

=== Global Wrestling Federation (1991) ===
A few weeks after Beach Brawl, Wet N' Wild appeared in the Global Wrestling Federation. The two wore bright and flashy wrestling tights and brought inflatable beach balls with them to the ring. Their female fans were referred to as "beach bunnies". They were among the 24 tag teams competing in a two-day tournament at the Dallas Sportatorium to crown the first-ever GWF Tag Team Champions. They defeated Chico Torres and El Azteca in the opening rounds on July 26, 1991, but were eliminated in the second by The Royal Family (Jack Victory and Rip Morgan).

=== All Japan Pro Wrestling (1991) ===
Allen was one of several U.S. independent stars invited to tour with All Japan Pro Wrestling. He went to Japan in the fall of 1991 to take part in AJPW's Real World Tag League and was paired with AJPW mainstay Johnny Ace. On the first day of the tournament, the team defeated Isamu Teranishi and Mighty Inoue at Korakuen Hall on November 16, 1991. During the next few weeks, Allen and Ace also faced the teams of Billy Black and Joel Deaton, Mighty Inoue and Rusher Kimura, Dan Kroffat and Doug Furnas, Kenta Kobashi and Tsuyoshi Kikuchi, Akira Taue and Jumbo Tsuruta, Abdullah the Butcher and Giant Kimala II, Steve Williams and Terry Gordy, Al Perez and Dory Funk Jr., Mitsuharu Misawa and Toshiaki Kawada, André the Giant and Giant Baba, and Dynamite Kid and Johnny Smith. Their bout with Kid and Smith served as the former's retirement match. Allen's team came in at 12th place with four points. While in Japan, he scored singles victories over Yoshinari Ogawa and Isamu Teranishi.

=== Independents (1991) ===
In between his Japanese tours, Allen made monthly appearances at the Tampa Sportatorium for Ron Slinker's International Championship Wrestling Alliance in Tampa, Florida wrestling opponents such as Mike Starr, Horace Boulder and Rob Van Dam. He also wrestled for numerous independent promotions in the Northeastern United States and briefly ran his own promotion, All-Star Championship Wrestling, in Staten Island. One of Allen's shows featured a wild brawl between Cactus Jack and himself which later aired on local television.

=== American Wrestling Federation (1991–1992) ===
It was during this period that Allen became involved with the American Wrestling Federation as a booker and performer. Allen's brief tenure as booker was criticized by both Mike Lano and AWF owner Gordon Scozzari. The promoter, in particular, claimed it was Allen's poor relationship with local wrestlers that forced him to import more expensive talent from outside the Northeast region. Scozzari also blamed the wrestler for losing the original heavyweight title alleging Allen had loaned it to then champion Paul Orndorff without his knowledge. Orndorff told Allen he wanted to use it in a TV commercial with Hulk Hogan but failed to return it.

On December 16, 1991, on the AWF's second television taping in Lowell, Massachusetts, Allen and Jeff Gaylord wrestled Bob Orton and Barry Horowitz, accompanied by manager Ronnie P. Gossett, in the co-main event. He and Gaylord continued teaming together and later became the promotion's first tag team champions. Allen and Scozzari co-promoted one live event together, a "sold show", in Staten Island following the original AWF TV tapings. In February 1992, the team traveled to Puerto Rico's Americas Wrestling Federation where they were billed as the "AWF International Tag Team Champions". On February 22, 1992, Sunny Beach and Gaylord successfully defended the belts against Galan Mendoza and Dr. Terror at an AWF show in Caguas, Puerto Rico.

=== World Wrestling Federation (1992) ===
Sandy Beach made a brief return to the World Wrestling Federation in the spring of 1992. On the March 29 episode of WWF Wrestling Challenge, Allen lost to Roddy Piper in a match for the WWF Intercontinental Championship at the Mississippi Coast Coliseum. He was also among the first victims of Tatanka's two-year undefeated streak on the April 4 episode of WWF Superstars at the Mobile Civic Center. The following day on WWF Wrestling Challenge.

=== Universal Wrestling Federation (1992) ===
Allen returned to the UWF at the UWF Fury Hour television tapings on June 19, 1992, where he reunited with Steve Ray to defeat Stone Cold and Johnny Kidd; at the same set of television tapings, Allen defeated Barry Horowitz in a singles match. On the July 13th episode of UWF Fury Hour, Wet N' Wild defeated The Marauder and The Viper.

=== All Japan Pro Wrestling (1992) ===
That summer, Allen returned to Japan for All Japan Pro Wrestling's Summer Action Series 1992. On the first day of the tour, Allen and Richard Slinger lost to The Youngbloods (Chris and Mark Youngblood) in Yokosuka, Japan. The following night, Allen defeated Ryukaku Izumida at Korakuen Hall; he would score several more victories over Ryukaku Izumida at Gosen City Hall and the Shizuoka Spring Water Gymnasium during the tour. On July 8, he teamed with former rival Barry Horowitz to defeat Mighty Inoue and Ryukaku Izumida in Aomori, Japan. He suffered his first loss two days later to Billy Black in Kuroishi. The next night in Akita, Japan, Allen and The Patriot were defeated by Johnny Ace and Stan Hansen. On July 19, they lost to Abdullah the Butcher and Giant Kimala II in Hachioji, Tokyo. He and The Patriot lost to both teams in subsequent rematches. On July 24, Allen was defeated by Mighty Inoue at the Izumo Dome. On July 28, Allen and Johnny Ace teamed against Abdullah the Butcher and Giant Kimala II at the Ishikawa Industrial Exhibition Hall. On the last day of the tour, Allen and Ace defeated Barry Horowitz and Billy Black in Matsudo.

=== World Wrestling Federation (1993) ===
February 1993, Sandy Beach made another brief return to the World Wrestling Federation doing mostly house shows and few TV tapings.

=== Later career and retirement (1993–2000) ===
In June 1993, Allen had a series of matches with Diamond Dallas Page in Germany for World Wrestling's Superstars. On October 22, 1993, he wrestled on John Arezzi's annual "Weekend of Champions" supercard held at the Ramada Inn in New York City, teaming with The Power Twins in a six-man tag team match against Jason Knight, Metal Maniac and Tom Burton; Sunny Beach's team was victorious. A year later, Allen was among the original UWF alumni to appear for the promotion's final PPV at the MGM Grand Arena. On September 23, 1994, at UWF Blackjack Brawl, Allen defeated Dr. Feelgood (with Missy Hyatt) via disqualification to win the vacant UWF SportsChannel Television Championship. Allen, according to wrestling historian Georgiann Makropoulos, became owner of the UWF video library when Herb Abrams died two years later.

Allen returned to New York where he remained involved in the local independent circuit for the rest of the decade. On March 25, 1995, Allen wrestled Primo Carnera III at an Eastern Shores Wrestling show in Southampton, New York. That same year, he brought Guillotine LeGrande into the industry by employing him to work as security for his shows. Allen's then partner, Dave Power, introduced LeGrande to the group who would eventually train him: Paul Lauria, Mike Norman, Craig Casey and Mikey Whipwreck. On July 2, 1995 he defeated Nikolai Volkoff by disqualification in Venezuela.

== Post-retirement ==
After his retirement from the ring, Allen worked as a senior account manager for Teligent in New York City. Allen was also employed as a bouncer and security for rock concerts at various times during his pro wrestling career. He entered the private security industry and started Forte Security Group in 2000. Allen spent two years at John Jay College, where he studied security management, and graduated with a Bachelor of Arts in 2004. Within ten years, Allen's company had grown to 260 employees and was providing security for nightclubs, restaurants and residential buildings in New York City. Additionally, Forte Security has been hired by visiting celebrities such as Jay-Z, Pamela Anderson, Russell Simmons, Jennifer Lopez and Michelle Rodriguez. He also operated a security guard company, Forte Network, from 2006 to 2010. In February 2013, Allen and Forte Security were featured in Long Island Business News.

In 2016, Forte Security changed its name to American Protection Bureau. Also in 2016 Allen bought BSI Security Training at the Long Island Training Center. Allen has his NY state license as a general topics instructor to teach security guard training at his school. It has over 900 employees and is also licensed in New Jersey, Pennsylvania and Florida. The company won The Best of Long Island Bethpage Bank contest from 2017-2020, and also won Best Security Guard Company on Long Island, New York four years in a row. Allen also has served as president of the Terry Parker Alumni Fund from May 2008 to Present and helped raise $500,000 for his old high school to purchase new sports equipment for its athletic teams.

== Filmography ==
| Year | Title | Role | Notes |
|---|---|---|---|
| 1989 | No Holds Barred | Short Headbanger | |
| 1990 | Death Warrant | Guard | |

== Championships and accomplishments ==
- Americas Wrestling Federation
  - AWF International Tag Team Championship (1 time) – with Jeff Gaylord
- International Wrestling Association
  - IWA Tag Team Championship (1 time) – The Terminator
- Pro Wrestling Illustrated
  - PWI ranked him # 395 of the 500 best singles wrestlers of the PWI 500 in 1993
  - PWI ranked him # 168 of the 500 best singles wrestlers of the PWI 500 in 1992
  - PWI ranked him # 222 of the 500 best singles wrestlers of the PWI 500 in 1991
- Universal Wrestling Federation
  - UWF SportsChannel Television Championship (1 time)
