= UWF Blackjack Brawl =

1994 Universal Wrestling Federation live television event

Blackjack Brawl
- Promotional poster featuring the UWF World Heavyweight Champion Steve Williams and Sid Vicious
- Promotion: Universal Wrestling Federation
- Date: September 23, 1994
- City: Paradise, Nevada
- Venue: MGM Grand Garden Arena
- Attendance: 600

Blackjack Brawl was the first and only major live television supercard event produced by Herb Abrams' Universal Wrestling Federation (UWF). The event took place on September 23, 1994 at the MGM Grand Garden Arena in Paradise, Nevada and aired live on SportsChannel America. The event was a successor to UWF's only pay-per-view event, Beach Brawl.

Eleven professional wrestling matches were contested on the card. The main event was a singles match for the World Heavyweight Championship, with champion Steve Williams defending the title against Sid Vicious. Nine of the matches at the event were championship matches; all championships contested at the event were either new championships, vacant prior to the event, or (in the case of two championships whose matches ended inconclusively) had been awarded on the night. New champions crowned included the Americas Championship, the Junior Heavyweight Championship, the Midget World Championship, the MGM Grand Championship and the World Tag Team Championship. The vacant SportsChannel Television Championship and the vacant Women's World Championship were also decided at the event. The two non-title matches at the event were a lumberjack match between Cactus Jack and Jimmy Snuka and a singles match between Samson and The Irish Assassin.

Despite implications during the broadcast that a follow-up event would happen, Blackjack Brawl would stand as the last event produced by UWF.

== Event ==
Other on-screen personnel
Role	Name
Commentators	John Tolos
Commentators	Carlo Gianelli
Ring announcer	Steve Rossi

=== Preliminary matches ===
The opening match of the event featured Johnny Ace taking on Dan Spivey for the inaugural Americas Championship. Near the end of the match, Spivey applied a long abdominal stretch on Ace until Ace's valet Missy Hyatt turned on Ace by throwing in the towel for him, thus costing him the match.

Mando Guerrero took on Jack Armstrong to crown the inaugural Junior Heavyweight Champion. Near the end of the match, Guerrero missed a moonsault from the top rope, allowing Armstrong to hit a series of elbow drops for the win.

Sunny Beach took on Dr. Feelgood for the vacant SportsChannel Television Championship. Near the end of the match, Feelgood pulled a rag out of his medical bag with black ink poured on it and then tried to shove the rag into Beach, but Beach countered by shoving the rag into Feelgood's face and pinning him to win the SportsChannel Television Championship. Hyatt slapped Beach after the match, allowing Feelgood to attack him with the rag from behind.

Bob Orton, Jr., defended the Southern States Championship against Finland Hellraiser Thor. Near the end of the match, Orton tried to hit a powerbomb, but Thor backdropped him out of the ring. Orton then threw water in Thor's face and dragged him out of the ring. Orton hit Thor with the championship belt and the match ended in a double disqualification. As a result, Orton retained the title. The two continued to brawl after the match until Herb Abrams handed Thor a chair to hit Orton. However, Orton countered forcing Thor to retreat.

Little Tokyo took on The Karate Kid for the inaugural Midget World Championship. Near the end of the match, Karate Kid reversed an Irish whip attempt to whip Tokyo into the corner and charged at him but Tokyo hit a double throat thrust for the win.

Samson took on The Irish Assassin. Samson hit a vertical suplex followed by a bridging German suplex for the pin.

Tyler Mane took on Steve Ray for the inaugural MGM Grand Championship. Ray tried to perform a sunset flip on Mane, but Mane countered that with a seated senton and grabbed the top rope for leverage, thus pinning Ray to win the match.

Tina Moretti took on Candi Devine for the vacant Women's World Championship. Devine hit a big scoop slam to Moretti for the win.

The Killer Bees (B. Brian Blair and Jim Brunzell) took on The New Powers of Pain (Warlord and Power Warrior) for the inaugural World Tag Team Championship. Near the end of the match, Power Warrior switched places with his brother David Power but Blair ended up pinning him.

The penultimate match of the event was a lumberjack match between Cactus Jack and Jimmy Snuka. The action spilled to the outside where the two brawled, resulting in a count out. The fighting continued and reached the audience where Snuka suplexed Jack into a row of seats.

=== Main event match ===
In the main event, Steve Williams defended the UWF World Heavyweight Championship against Sid Vicious. Williams hit a Doctor Bomb to Vicious and covered him for the pinfall but Dan Spivey attacked him, causing Vicious to be disqualified. As a result, Williams retained the title.

== Reception ==
Blackjack Brawl largely received negative reviews from critics. Arnold Furious of 411Mania rated the event 3 out of 10, considering the event to be "The usual horseshit from UWF" noting that there were "Stupid stipulations, bad booking, nothing matches and titles that don’t mean anything." However, he also noticed some worthwhile moments, stating "The midget match is pretty good and its weird seeing Sid actually wrestling for a while in the main event."

== Results ==
No.	Results	Stipulations	Times
1	Dan Spivey defeated Johnny Ace (with Missy Hyatt) via submission	Singles match for the inaugural UWF Americas Championship	07:20
2	Jack Armstrong defeated Mando Guerrero	Singles match for the inaugural UWF Junior Heavyweight Championship	04:36
3	Sunny Beach defeated Dr. Feelgood (with Missy Hyatt)	Singles match for the vacant UWF SportsChannel Television Championship	05:26
4	Bob Orton, Jr. (c) vs. Finland Hellraiser Thor ended in a double disqualification	Singles match for the UWF Southern States Championship	06:12
5	Little Tokyo defeated The Karate Kid	Singles match for the inaugural UWF Midget World Championship	07:33
6	Samson defeated The Irish Assassin	Singles match	04:13
7	Tyler Mane defeated Steve Ray	Singles match for the inaugural UWF MGM Grand Championship	07:25
8	Candi Devine defeated Tina Moretti	Singles match for the vacant UWF Women's World Championship	03:26
9	The Killer Bees (B. Brian Blair and Jim Brunzell) defeated The New Powers of Pain (Warlord and Power Warrior)	Tag team match for the inaugural UWF World Tag Team Championship	11:49
10	Cactus Jack vs. Jimmy Snuka ended in a double countout	Lumberjack match	09:03
11	Steve Williams (c) defeated Sid Vicious by disqualification	Singles match for the UWF World Heavyweight Championship	11:01
(c) / – the champion(s) heading into the match

== See also ==
- UWF Beach Brawl
- UWF Fury Hour
