= Scott L. Schwartz =

American professional wrestler and actor (1959–2024)

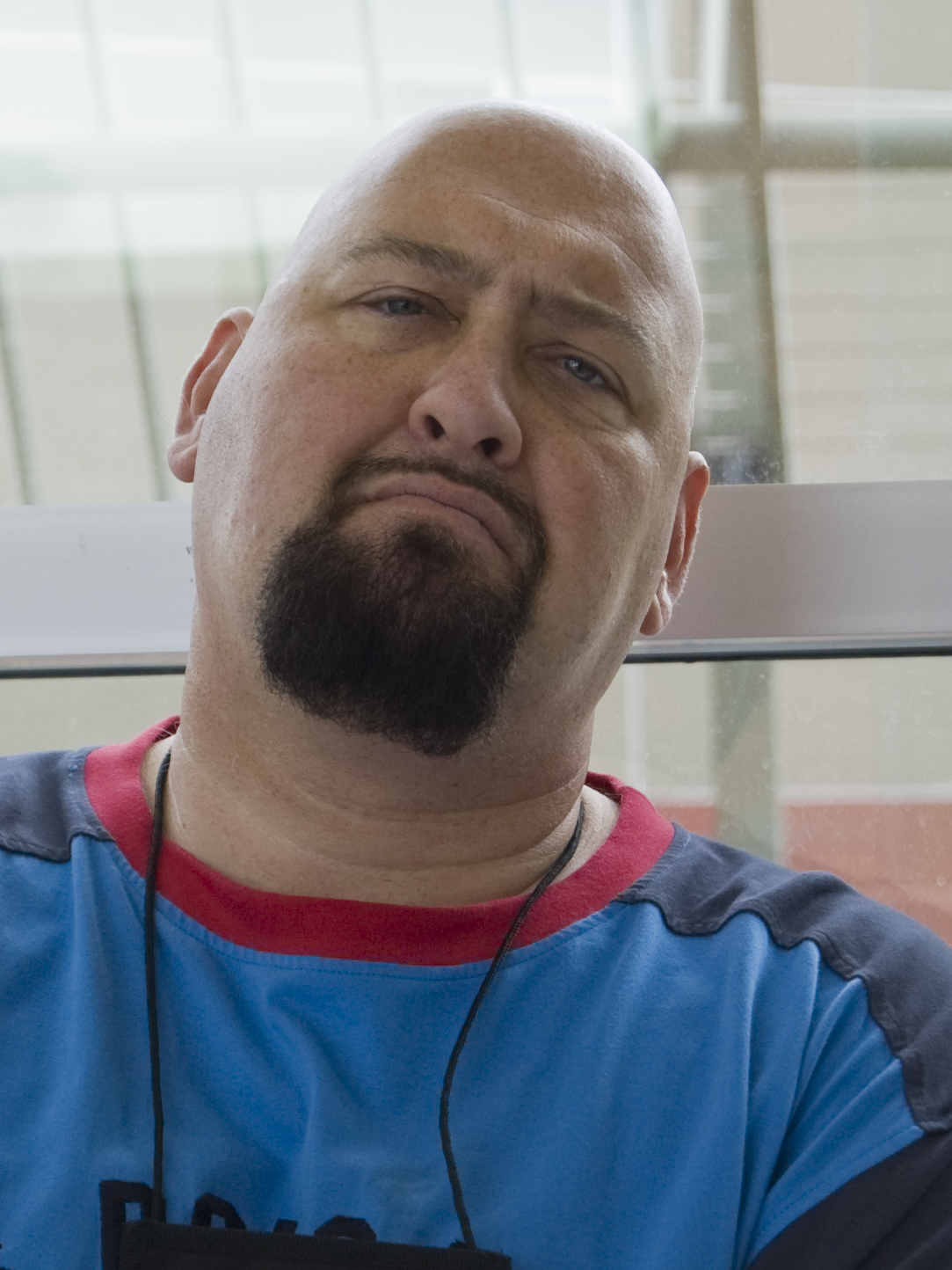
- Schwartz in 2008
- Born: March 16, 1959; Philadelphia, Pennsylvania, U.S.
- Died: November 26, 2024 (aged 65)
- Other names: Scott Schwartz; Giant David; Joshua Ben-Gurion: The Israeli Commando; Igor the Giant
- Occupations: Film actor Television actor Stuntman professional wrestler Los Angeles County Sheriff's Department
- Known for: Roles as huge villain in multiple films and for recurring role as "Bruiser" in Ocean's Eleven, Ocean's Twelve, and Ocean's Thirteen
- Height: 6 ft 10 in (2.08 m)

Scott Leslie Schwartz (March 16, 1959 – November 26, 2024) also known as The Ultimate Bad Guy, was an American film and television actor, stuntman and professional wrestler. His size and agility at 6 ft 10 in (2.08 m) and 303 pounds (137 kg) had allowed him many roles as a thug or villain for film and television.

== Early life ==
Schwartz was born in Philadelphia, Pennsylvania on March 16, 1959. He was of Israeli descent and was a devout Jew. Schwartz was born and raised in Philadelphia, where he played football, baseball and ice hockey at Washington High School before attending Temple University. After college, he became a professional wrestler, wrestling under the ring-names of "Joshua Ben-Gurion—The Israeli Commando" and "Giant David". Schwartz toured as a wrestler and held many titles, before turning his career toward performance in film and television.

Apart from his acting, and after completing training, Schwartz became a Los Angeles County Sheriff's Deputy.

== Professional wrestling career ==
After college, Schwartz became a professional wrestler, trained in the late 1970s by wrestling's Walter "Killer" Kowalski. Schwartz's original ring-name was Giant David, but by the 1980s he was known as Joshua Ben-Gurion—The Israeli Commando and Igor the Giant. As a professional wrestler, he performed in Japan, South Africa, Australia, New Zealand, American Samoa, Western Samoa, Fiji, Tonga, Guam, Canada and 40 of the 50 United States. He was promoted by Verne Gagne, Vince McMahon, Herb Abrams, Antone "Ripper" Leone, and Bruno Sammartino.

== Film and television career ==
Schwartz was wrestling on tour in Bakersfield, California, when he was approached by a Hollywood agent. After seeing Schwartz's wrestling on television, the agent had traveled to Bakerfield to meet him, feeling Schwartz should take his skills into performing arts. At first, Schwartz was reluctant to change careers, wanting to retire as a wrestler.

In his early stunt work, and because of his background in pro wrestling, Schwartz was able to handle the staged combat, which required protecting opponents from harm. Due to his look, size, agility, and ability to handle dialogue, he was able to obtain roles as the "bad guy" in many films and television projects. He was known for his work in such films and television shows as Buffy the Vampire Slayer, Angel, Star Trek: Enterprise, The Scorpion King, Charmed, The Tick, and Black Scorpion among others, but he is probably most recognized for his role as 'Bruiser' in the films Ocean's Eleven, Ocean's Twelve and Ocean's Thirteen. He appeared in such big budget films as Spider-Man, Fire Down Below, Starsky & Hutch, and Fun with Dick and Jane.

== Death ==
Schwartz died from congestive heart failure on November 26, 2024, at the age of 65.

== Championships and accomplishments ==
- Universal Wrestling Federation
  - UWF Israeli Championship (1 time)

== Filmography ==
As actor

- UWF Fury Hour (1990, TV Series)
- Shock 'Em Dead (1991) as Guard
- For Parents Only (1991) as "The Wrench"
- Terminal USA (1993) as Tony "Big Tony"
- Back in Action (1993) as Kasajian's Thug (uncredited)
- Dangerous Waters (1994) as Carlito
- Silent Fury (1994) as "Crusher"
- Savate (1995) as Bruno "The Horrible"
- The Set-Up (1995) as Maniac (uncredited)
- Tiger Mask (1996) as "Sonic Boom"
- Meet Wally Sparks (1997) as American Wrestler #2
- Fire Down Below (1997) as "Pimple"
- Dilemma (1997) as Guard #1
- High Voltage (1997) as Biker
- The Misadventures of James Spawn (1998) as Drill Sergeant
- Centurion Force (1998) as Nicky
- P.U.N.K.S. (1999) as Convict
- Martial Law (1999, TV Series) as Boris (uncredited)
- Bridge of Dragons (1999) as Belmont
- Final Voyage (1999) as Russ
- V.I.P. (1999, TV Series) as Mo Big
- The Flintstones in Viva Rock Vegas (2000) as Caveman Boxer (uncredited)
- Agent Red (2000) as Bald Henchman (uncredited)
- Just Sue Me (2000) as The Chauffeur
- The Black Rose (2000) as Armand
- Nash Bridges (2001, TV Series) as Pierre LaFoote
- Carman: The Champion (2001) as Mike "Big Mike"
- Southlander: Diary of a Desperate Musician (2001) as Chef
- Crash Point Zero (2000) as "Bear"
- Tomcats (2001) as Biker (uncredited)
- The One (2001) as Prisoner (uncredited)
- Ocean's Eleven (2001) as "Bulldog", The Bruiser
- The Tick (2002, TV Series) as Rex
- The Scorpion King (2002) as Torturer
- Spider-Man (2002) as Screaming Wrestler (uncredited)
- Lost Treasure (2003) as Joe "Crazy Joe"
- Starsky and Hutch (2004) as Ron "Fat Ron"
- Terminal Island (2004) as Frank
- Max Havoc: Curse of the Dragon (2004) as Biker Bar Tough
- Ocean's Twelve (2004) as Bruiser
- Daydream Believer (2005, Short) as Schulte
- Fun with Dick and Jane (2005) as Bigger Convenience Store Clerk
- Blood Ranch (2006)
- Mind of Mencia (TV Series) as "Turk"
- Cain and Abel (2006) as Yuri
- Vagabond (2006) as Carnivore
- Smoked (2006, Short) as Schulte
- Epic Movie (2007) as Rubeus Hagrid (uncredited)
- ELI (2007, Short) as Graves
- Ocean's Thirteen (2007) as Bruiser
- What We Do Is Secret (2007) as Biker (uncredited)
- Placebo (2008) as Ed
- The Young and the Restless (2009, TV Series) as Amos Slaughter
- Ctrl (2009, TV Series) as Security Guard
- Lost in the Woods (2009) as Kurt
- Wrong Side of Town (2010) as Deacon
- Listen to Your Heart (2010) as Greg
- Daddy's Home (2010) as Deputy Cruz
- The Sinners (2010) as Officer Rains
- Journey to Promethea (2010, TV Movie) as Kronin
- For Christ's Sake (2010) as Gordy
- Changing Hands (2010) as Sergeant Mike Smith
- Changing Hands Feature (2012)
- Inventing Adam (2013) as Morty
- Betrayal (2013) as Misha
- Xtinction: Predator X (2014) as Larry Boudreaux
- Better Criminal (2016) as Danny
- Holding St. Peter's Conquest [Us] (2017) as Polonski
- Garlic & Gunpowder (2017) as Shop Owner

As stuntman

- Dilemma (1997)
- My Giant (1998)
- The Adventures of Rocky & Bullwinkle (2000)
- Agent Red (2000) (stunts)
- Gedo (2001)
- Crazy as Hell (2002)
- Epic Movie (2007)
- Weeds (2007) (TV)
