= XPW Arena =

XPW Arena may refer to:

- Venues used by Xtreme Pro Wrestling
  - Reseda Country Club in Reseda, CA in 1999
  - 2300 Arena in Philadelphia, PA from 2002 to 2003
