= Rockin' Robin =

Rockin' Robin usually refers to either:

- Robin Yount, a former professional baseball player
- Rockin' Robin (wrestler), Robin Smith, a professional female wrestler
- "Rockin' Robin" (song), a rock 'n' roll song
