= UWF Fury Hour =

American professional wrestling television program

- Created by: Herb Abrams
- Starring: See UWF alumni
- Opening theme: "The Equalizer Busy Equalizing" by Stewart Copeland
- Country of origin: United States
- No. of episodes: 69 (list of episodes)

Production
- Executive producer: Lenny Duge
- Production locations: Reseda Country Club (1990); New York Penta (1991); Universal Studios Florida (1991); War Memorial Auditorium (1991); Spartanburg Memorial Auditorium (1992)
- Camera setup: Multicamera setup
- Running time: 60 minutes (including commercials)
- Production company: Abrams Productions

Original release
- Network: SportsChannel America (1990–1991); Prime Ticket (1992)
- Release: October 1, 1990 – October 25, 1992

UWF Fury Hour is a professional wrestling television program that was produced by Universal Wrestling Federation (UWF) and broadcast weekly every Monday night on SportsChannel America from October 1, 1990, to September 23, 1991. The show was part of the network's Feet, Fists and Fury programming block that also included kickboxing and boxing.

A shoot occurred during a semifinal SportsChannel Television Championship Tournament match between Steve Ray and Steve Williams that aired in May 1991. Allegedly, Herb Abrams thought Ray was sleeping with his wife and paid Williams extra money to rough Ray up during the bout. Ray would claim years later that this was a worked shoot.

After months without television, the company signed a deal with Prime Ticket for new episodes. These new episodes taped at Spartanburg Memorial Auditorium began airing as UWF Thunder Hour on Sunday nights in July 1992.

In March 1995, existing Fury Hour and Thunder Hour episodes were repackaged to a half-hour format and aired daily on ESPN2. Those same 24 repackaged episodes later re-aired on ESPN Classic between 2008 and 2013. Steve Ray tried suing ESPN Classic in 2014 for using his likeness during these rebroadcasts, but was unsuccessful.

ESPN Classic Canada reran the original one-hour format episodes of Fury Hour and Thunder Hour in 2004.

== Commentators ==
Commentators	Tenure
Herb Abrams and Bruno Sammartino	September 24, 1990 - November 11, 1990
Craig DeGeorge and Bruno Sammartino	December 6, 1990 - July 20, 1991
Craig DeGeorge and Lou Albano	April 7, 1991
Craig DeGeorge and John Tolos	June 19, 1992
Carlo Gianelli and John Tolos	July 24, 1993 - September 23, 1994

== Commissioners ==
Commissioner	Date started	Date finished
Arnold Ross	September 24, 1990	October 11, 1990
Carlo Gianelli	July 24, 1993	July 24, 1993
Bruno Sammartino	September 23, 1994	September 23, 1994

== Recurring segments ==
Segment	Segment Type	Host(s)	Years active
Ask The Wrestlers	Interview	Herb Abrams	1990 - 1991
Captain Lou's Corner	Interview	Lou Albano	1990 - 1991
To the Point	Interview	Herb Abrams and Lou Albano	1991
Colonel Red's Corner	Interview	Colonel Red	1992

== See also ==
- UWF Beach Brawl
- UWF Blackjack Brawl
