= B. Brian Blair =

American professional wrestler (born 1957)

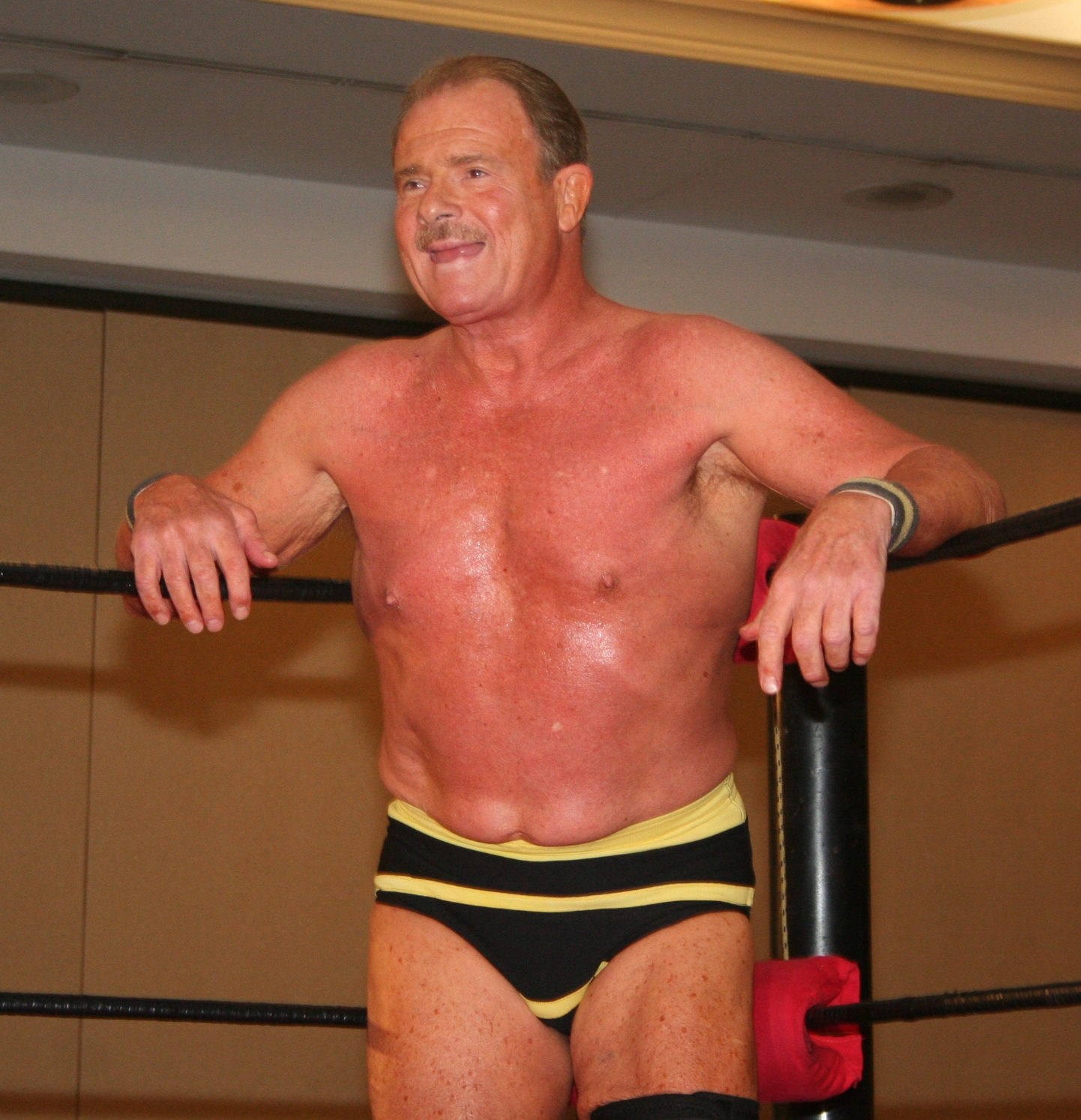
- Blair in 2014

Personal information
- Born: Brian Leslie Blair; January 12, 1957 (age 69) Gary, Indiana, U.S.
- Education: University of Louisville
- Spouses: Michelle McGuirk (divorced); Toni Sabella
- Children: 2
- Family: Leroy McGuirk (ex-father-in-law)

Professional wrestling career
- Ring name(s): B. Brian Blair; Brian Blair; The Killer Bee
- Billed height: 6 ft 1 in (185 cm)
- Billed weight: 235 lb (107 kg)
- Trained by: Buddy Colt; Eddie Graham; Hiro Matsuda; Jack Brisco; Bob Backlund
- Debut: 1977
- Retired: 2019

6th President of the Cauliflower Alley Club
- In office 2014–Present
- Preceded by: Nick Bockwinkel

Hillsborough County Commissioner, District 6
- In office 2004–2008
- Preceded by: Jan Platt
- Succeeded by: Kevin Beckner

Brian Leslie Blair (born January 12, 1957) is an American former professional wrestler. He is best known for his appearances with the World Wrestling Federation (WWF) under the ring name B. Brian Blair as one half of the tag team The Killer Bees in the 1980s.

== Early life ==
Blair was born on January 12, 1957, in Gary, Indiana, United States. Blair began competing in sports in junior high school and won city championships as well as a regional junior high school heavyweight. Blair won many accolades in high school other than sports; he was named "Mr. Titan" and was voted "Best all Around" his senior year. To this day he holds the record for most letters at Hillsborough High School in Tampa, Florida. After graduating at the age of 17, Blair started training in the summer for Championship Wrestling from Florida (CWF). Blair had his heart set on playing football for the then NCAA Division II powerhouse, the University of Tampa, where he sold sodas to the fans and watched his favorite players, Freddie Solomon and Paul Orndorff. The University of Tampa folded their football program, largely due to the new arrival of the Tampa Bay Buccaneers. Deeply saddened, Blair attended Saint Leo College near Dade City under coach Tillrow Morrison, then transferred to the University of Louisville on a football scholarship, although he never earned a varsity letter; he majored in both business and political science.

== Professional wrestling career ==
=== Early career (1977–1985) ===
In the summers months from 1975–1977 Blair started training to be a wrestler with Hiro Matsuda in Florida. Blair debuted in 1977 with Eddie Graham's CWF where he worked primarily as a face. Blair debuted in a tag team match facing Pat Patterson and Ivan Koloff. One of Blair's early opponents was another Matsuda student later known as Hulk Hogan. After CWF, Blair moved on to Bob Geigel's NWA Central States promotion out of Kansas City, Missouri around 1978 where he feuded with Jesse Ventura. Blair also teamed up with "Bulldog" Bob Brown and won the Central States Tag Team championships. He also appeared regularly for Leroy McGuirk's Tri-State promotion, here he met and married Leroy McGuirk's daughter Mike McGuirk in 1980. He was even shot at by Leroy when he tried to talk to Mike before leaving town. While in the Tri-State promotion Blair briefly won the Junior Heavyweight Title from Ron Starr. The one-week reign was Blair's first professional wrestling title reign. After leaving the Tri-State promotion Blair joined up with Fritz Von Erich's World Class Championship Wrestling promotion in Texas, where he lived with David Von Erich for over a year. In WCCW he gained victories over Killer Tim Brooks and former WWWF World Champion Stan Stasiak. During his time in Texas he was asked by Alberto Madril to be his partner in a tournament to crown new American tag-team Champions. Their run with the gold was cut short by Killer Tim Brooks and Armand Hussein in September 1981.

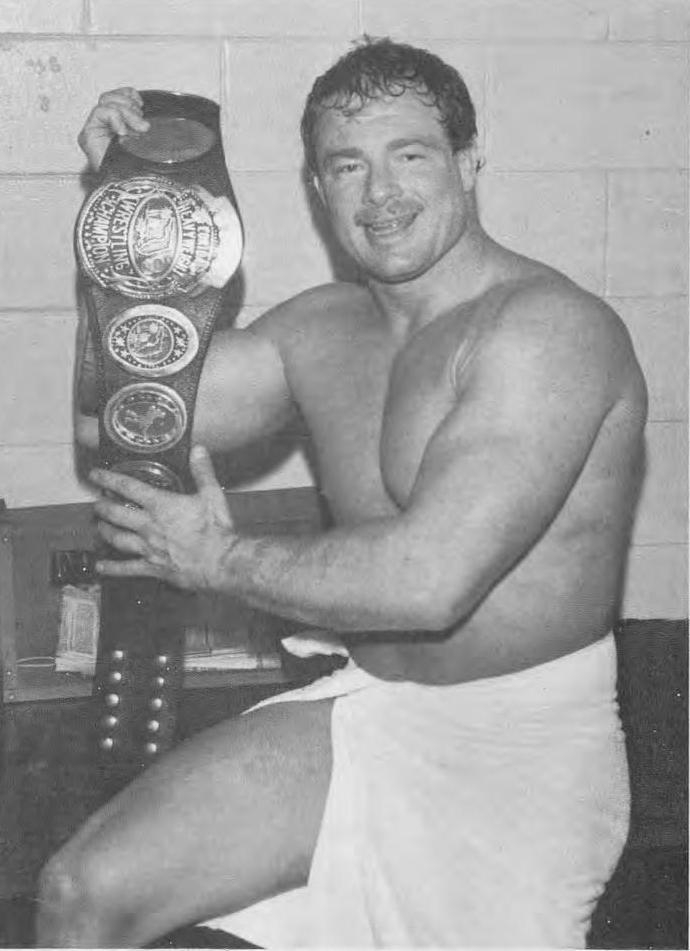
Blair as NWA Florida Heavyweight Champion, circa 1985

In 1981 Vince McMahon, Sr. booked Blair to wrestle for the World Wrestling Federation (WWF) most notably on their tours of Japan through New Japan Pro-Wrestling (NJPW) where he faced Japanese wrestlers Antonio Inoki and Tatsumi Fujinami. After gaining experience all over the world Blair returned to CWF. On July 11, 1982, Blair beat Jimmy Garvin for the NWA Florida Heavyweight Championship and defended it successfully against Stan Hansen and Bruiser Brody. In 1983 Blair joined the WWF once again as they began to expand to a national promotion. During his first stint with the WWF his self-proclaimed highlight was a match with Paul Orndorff in St. Louis. After the short run with the WWF, Blair moved on to Georgia Championship Wrestling as well as a return to Florida Championship Wrestling. In Florida, Blair picked up another Florida title run as well as unseating "Ravishing" Rick Rude as the Florida Southern Champion. During his run with the WWF in 1984, Blair often teamed with fellow wrestler Tony Garea. The team of Blair and Garea would dominate jobbers, but were unable to move up the card against more established tag teams. They teamed up until Blair left later in that same year.

=== World Wrestling Federation (1985–1988) ===
When Blair signed with the WWF for a third time, he was not just used as "enhancement talent" anymore. Instead, he was teamed up with Jim Brunzell to form The Killer Bees. The teaming of Blair and Brunzell was suggested by Hulk Hogan. The team had a special gimmick referred to as "Masked Confusion" where both wrestlers pulled out identical masks during the match to confuse their opponents and usually win their matches that way. The "Masked Confusion" idea was given to Blair by Billy Red Lyons who had used it in Maple Leaf Wrestling. They constantly challenged for the WWF World Tag Team Title but never won it, although the fans were thoroughly behind them. Their biggest feud in the WWF was against The Hart Foundation, Bret Hart and Jim Neidhart whom they wrestled somewhere between "300 and 600" times according to Blair himself. The Bees also had a running feud with the Funks (Hoss, Terry and Jimmy Jack). They faced Hoss and Jimmy Jack Funk in front of 70,000 people at The Big Event in Toronto (a card headlined by Hulk Hogan and Paul Orndorff).

Shortly after SummerSlam 88, the team was split without any reason. Still cast as faces, both Brunzell and Blair were recast as singles wrestlers. In his first televised match following the undeclared split, Blair defeated Danny Davis on Prime Time Wrestling on September 27, 1988. This would be his only notable win that month, as he found himself on the losing end of house show series with Hercules, Dino Bravo, and the newly arrived Terry Taylor and Curt Hennig. Meanwhile, on television Blair remained undefeated, pinning Barry Horowitz and Mike Sharpe on episodes of Prime Time. On the November 5 edition of Prime Time he was announced as a replacement for the departing Junkyard Dog on the team of Jake Roberts at the 1988 Survivor Series. In the buildup to the PPV Blair wrestled Mike Sharpe on the house show circuit; however he departed on November 16 and was ultimately replaced on the show by Scott Casey. His former partner would remain with the WWF into the early 1990s.

In the fall of 1988, Blair left the WWF amid claims that the team had been promised the WWF Tag Team Championship three times by company owner Vince McMahon, but the promises were never kept. Blair also claims he was asked to help heel team The Brain Busters (Arn Anderson and Tully Blanchard) win matches. Not wanting to become a heel, Blair refused and quit instead. Brunzell and Blair later complained about WWF owner Vince McMahon who continued merchandising products of The Killer Bees without their permission or financial compensation. Blair and Brunzell wrestled at Wrestlemania 2, 3 and 4 before Blair gave his notice in Salisbury, MD right before Wrestlemania 5. The Killer Bees also won the Frank Tunney Memorial Tag Team Tournament in Toronto, Canada, were winners at the first Survivor Series, performed at The Big Event in Toronto, Canada, and at the first Royal Rumble. The Killer Bees were also featured on Saturday Night's Main Event VIII, X, and XV cards. Bret Hart states in his book "My Real Life in the Cartoon World of Wrestling", that the best tag team match of his career was against Blair and Brunzell. Blair left the WWF that November and took a hiatus from wrestling.

=== American Wrestling Association (1990) ===
After leaving the WWF in 1988, Blair returned to wrestling in 1990 as Blair signed a short-term contract with Verne Gagne's American Wrestling Association. Blair challenged Larry Zbyszko for the AWA World Heavyweight Championship. Blair defeated Zbyszko by disqualification meaning the title couldn't change hands that way with Zbyszko retaining the title.

=== Universal Wrestling Federation (1990–1994) ===
Blair was one of the first "names" to work regularly for Herb Abrams Universal Wrestling Federation (UWF) when it opened its doors in late 1990 quickly becoming a regular on the federations Fury Hour shows. In the UWF, Blair reunited with Jim Brunzell but due to the WWF holding the trademark to the name "The Killer Bees" they were billed as "Masked Confusion". They competed on the UWF's first (and only) PPV, Beach Brawl, where they beat the Power Twins. The team was also the only UWF Tag Team champions. They won the title at UWF's last big show known as Blackjack Brawl where they beat the "New Powers of Pain" (The Warlord and Power Warrior). The Bees would also regularly wrestle as one of the top tag teams on UWF Fury Hour. Blair was given a big push in the UWF, usually defeating the UWF's preliminary talent, and even one of the top heels of the company who he also feuded with, Bob Orton, Jr.

=== Later career (1994–2019, 2025) ===
After the UWF folded, Blair continued to compete on the independent circuit, especially around his home state of Florida. Through the mid-1990s, Blair also travelled to Japan regularly and wrestled for New Japan Pro-Wrestling usually as "Brian Blair" or "The Killer Bee". In 1998, Blair won the NWA Florida Tag Team Championship with Steve Keirn holding the title from November 13, 1998, to August 15, 2000, when the title was vacated following a match with the Bushwhackers. Blair and Keirn faced off in a singles match to determine who got to pick a new partner; Blair won and picked local star Cyborg The Wrestler (Kevin Donofrio) as his partner. The two held the tag team titles until July 10, 2001, where they were forced to forfeit the title due to injuries. On March 31, 2012, Blair returned to the ring as he teamed up with Carlos Colon, Lanny Poffo, and Mike Graham as "Florida Team" to defeat the team of Gary Royal, Larry Zbyszko, Ron Bass, and The Masked Superstar (as "Georgia Team") in an eight-man tag team elimination match on an event held on his home-state of Florida. Blair and Graham were the sole survivors. On April 14, 2013, Brian Blair faced Matt Riviera for the Vendetta Pro Wrestling annual event "Pro Casino Royale" edition of 2013.

On August 5, 2014, B. Brian Blair faced wrestler "The Tokyo Monster" Kahagas for American Pro Made Wrestling promotion in a winning effort for Blair. On September 3, 2014, Blair faced former rival Matt Riviera for the annual National Wrestling Alliance event "Mid-Atlantic Legends Fanfest" edition of 2014. Riviera said some days before the match he would "humble" Blair. This was a reference to many of The Iron Sheik's remarks towards Blair. Blair was defeated. On October 26, 2014, Blair faced The Cuban Assassin for the annual NWA "WrestleFest" in a winning effort for Blair. On July 21, 2016, Blair competed on the Impact Pro Wrestling George Tragos/Lou Thesz Hall of Fame show teaming with Wes Brisco & "Hot Fire" Myron Reid taking on AJ Smooth, Justin Decent, and Aaron Von Barron. Blair had what was billed as his last match at the "Tragos-Thesz "Pro-Wrestling Hall of Fame" on July 22, 2017, where he successfully tagged with Wes Brisco. Both Blair (2015 - Thesz) and Brunzell (2014 - "Mazurki" are Iowa HOF inductees. As of November 2017, Blair and Brunzell are still in high Demand now working many Comic-Cons and Independent Autograph Sessions. Both Blair and Brunzell have a new Comic Book Series called the "Killer Bees" a true life story (animated) about Blair and Brunzell's journey to become Pro-wrestlers available at Inversepress.com. In 2019, it was announced that Blair's retirement match would take place on July 26, 2019, against James Jeffries at the Impact Pro Wrestling show during the George Tragos/Lou Thesz Professional Wrestling Museum Hall Of Fame Induction Weekend in Waterloo, IA. In addition, James Beard was announced as the Special Guest Referee for the match. Blair emerged victorious after nailing Jefferies with the NWA Florida Heavyweight Championship, which he brought with him to ringside.

On July 25, 2025, Blair made an appearance on SmackDown during the tribute to Hulk Hogan.

== Personal life ==
Blair is married to Toni Sabella and they have two sons. Blair owned and managed four Gold's Gym fitness centers in the Tampa Bay area with fellow wrestler, Steve Keirn. They were sold in 1999 for $2.1 million.

Brian Blair's first attempt for a seat on the county commission was against Pat Frank but he lost in the 2002 race by a narrow margin. In 2004, Blair ran again and was elected County Commissioner, District 6 (countywide) for Hillsborough County defeating former city councilman and future mayor of Tampa Bob Buckhorn. The race was one of the closest county commission races in the history of Hillsborough County with Blair winning with 216,430 votes to Buckhorn's 214,062. In 2008 Blair ran for re-election winning the Republican primary against Don Kruse on August 26, 2008, then lost to Hillsborough County's first openly gay candidate Kevin Beckner in the November 4, 2008 general election. One concept that Brian had was of the senior zone. It was designed to warn other drivers and to be cautious of senior citizens exiting or entering their parking lots. "A senior zone slows down traffic without the need for a traffic light. We found that here in Florida, senior citizens prefer having traffic lights near certain entrances or exits of lots. The traffic lights we originally were looking at were too expensive. I worked with a traffic engineer and we came up with senior signs that are posted with flashing caution lights and 'reduce speed limit' written on the pavement. The cost of this whole project would have been the same cost of a traffic light. It reduced accidents a great deal and just like all citizens, the senior citizens safety is a high priority in our community" said Brian. The senior zone was voted number one and got picked for the most innovated project of the year in 2008.

A devout Christian, Blair is active in his church; Idlewild Baptist. In the summer of 1990, Blair was present when Brutus Beefcake had a near fatal para-sailing accident. Blair was the person to pull Brutus out of the water after being struck in the face by the knees of a novice parasailer. On July 12, 2015, Blair received two major honors when the Thesz/Tragos arm of the Dan Gable Museum and Hall of Fame inducted Blair into their Hall of Fame while also awarding him with the highly coveted "Lou Thesz" Award. Blair is now the president and CEO of the 501c3 Cauliflower alley Club. The Cauliflower Alley Club (CAC) gives financial assistance to people from the wrestling Industry who have fallen on difficult times. In 2017 Brian Blair starred with fellow wrestler Ron Bass in the feature film Silent Times Directed by Christopher Annino. In 2017 Brian Blair and tag team partner Jim Brunzell starred in an official comic book series with Inverse Press.

On July 23, 2021, Steve Keirn announced at The Gathering, a fan fest in Charlotte, NC, that Blair's son Brett was murdered in Florida at the age of 29. His body was found at a remote construction site.

== Autobiography ==
In July 2021, the release of Blair's autobiography, Truth Bee Told, was leaked in an article from Slam Wrestling disclosing the death of Blair's eldest son, Brett. In September of the same year, the book's release month of October 2021 was formally announced. The book is coauthored by Ian Douglass, a contributor to the autobiographies of Dan Severn, Hornswoggle and Bugsy McGraw, and it features forewords from Bret Hart and Steve Keirn, and an afterword from Hulk Hogan. Truth Bee Told was officially released on October 2, 2021. In February 2022, it was listed among the finalists for "Best Pro Wrestling Book" in the 2021 Wrestling Observer Awards.

== Other media appearances ==
Blair appears in multiple episodes the documentary series Dark Side of the Ring produced by Vice Media. He is featured in the Episodes "Cocaine and Cowboy Boots: the Herb Abrams Story" (season 2, episode 8) which covers the Universal Wrestling Federation (Herb Abrams), "The Steroid Trials" (season 3, episode 14) which covers the backstory and circumstances of the court case United States v. McMahon, "Breaking the Cycle: The Graham Dynasty" (season 4, episode 3) which focuses on Eddie Graham and his Family, and "What Happened to Doink the Clown?" (season 4, episode 4) which is focused on Matt Borne.

== Bibliography ==
- Smarten Up! Say It Right (2001)
- Truth Bee Told (2021)

== Championships and accomplishments ==
- Cauliflower Alley Club
  - Other honoree (2002)
- Championship Wrestling from Florida
  - NWA Florida Heavyweight Championship (2 times)
  - NWA Florida Tag Team Championship (2 times) – with Steve Keirn (1) and Cyborg (1)
  - NWA Southern Heavyweight Championship (Florida version) (1 time)
- George Tragos/Lou Thesz Professional Wrestling Hall of Fame
  - Lou Thesz Award (2015)
- NWA Big Time Wrestling
  - NWA American Tag Team Championship (1 time) – with Al Madril
- NWA Central States
  - Central States Tag Team Championship (1 time) – with Bulldog Bob Brown
- NWA Tri-State
  - NWA Tri-State Junior Heavyweight Championship (1 time)
- National Wrestling League
  - NWL Tag Team Championship (1 time) – with Paul Orndorff
- Universal Wrestling Federation
  - UWF World Tag Team Championship (1 time) – with Jim Brunzell
- Wrestling Observer Newsletter
  - Most Underrated Wrestler (1984)
- World Wrestling Federation
  - $5,000 Battle Royal winner (with Jim Brunzell)
  - Frank Tunney Sr. Memorial Tag Team Tournament (1987) – with Jim Brunzell
- Connecticut Hall of Honor
  - Class of 2017
