= Universal Wrestling Federation (Herb Abrams) championships =

Wrestling competition

Universal Wrestling Federation (UWF) was a professional wrestling promotion based in Marina del Rey, California from 1991 to 1994. This is a list of titles that were awarded and defended in the UWF.

Not all championships were active during the entire history of the promotion.

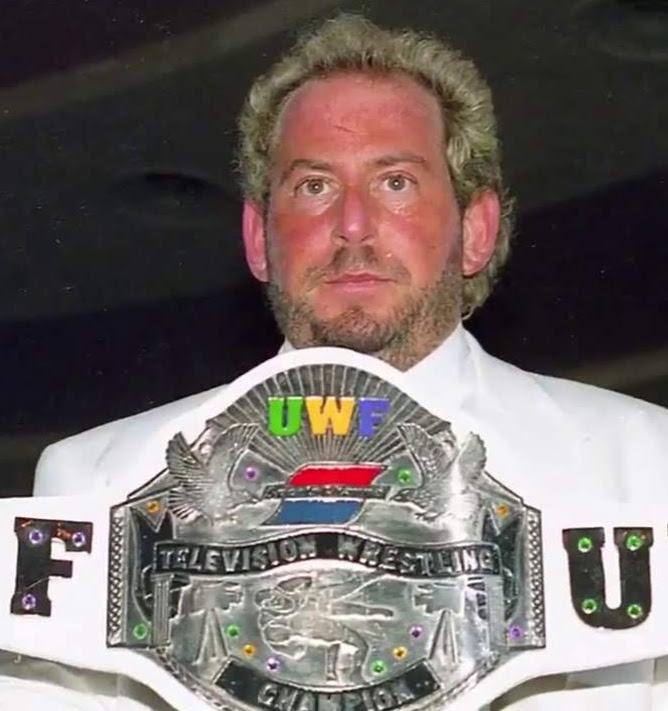
Herb Abrams holding the UWF SportsChannel Television Championship at New York Penta in May 1991

== UWF Americas Championship ==
The UWF Americas Championship was a short lived secondary title in the Universal Wrestling Federation that was created not long before the federation folded.

Wrestler:	Reigns:	Date:	Place:	Notes:
Dan Spivey	1	September 23, 1994	Las Vegas, NV	Defeated Johnny Ace to win the title
Inactive		September 23, 1994	Las Vegas, NV	Title retired.

== UWF Intercontinental Heavyweight Championship ==
The UWF Intercontinental Heavyweight Championship was a secondary title in the Universal Wrestling Federation. It was awarded to Bob Orton, Jr. at a television taping, but it was only defended once.

Wrestler:	Reigns:	Date:	Place:	Notes:
Bob Orton, Jr.	1	July 24, 1993	Minot, ND	Title awarded
Inactive		October 10, 1993	(N/A)	Title retired.

== UWF Israeli Championship ==
The UWF Israeli Championship was a secondary title in the Universal Wrestling Federation. It was awarded to Joshua Ben-Gurion in May 1991 and retired in November 1991.

Wrestler:	Reigns:	Date:	Place:	Notes:
Joshua Ben-Gurion	1	May 10, 1991	New York City, NY	Title awarded.
Inactive		September 16, 1991	Mount Vernon, NY	Title retired.

== UWF Junior Heavyweight Championship ==
The UWF Junior Heavyweight Championship was a secondary title in the Universal Wrestling Federation. "Wildman" Jack Armstrong became the first and only champion by defeating Mando Guerrero at the final UWF show.

Wrestler:	Reigns:	Date:	Place:	Notes:
Jack Armstrong	1	September 23, 1994	Las Vegas, NV	Defeated Mando Guerrero to win the title
Inactive		September 23, 1994	Las Vegas, NV	Title retired.

== UWF MGM Grand Championship ==
The UWF MGM Grand Championship was a secondary title in the Universal Wrestling Federation. Tyler Mane became the first and only champion by defeating Steve Ray at the final UWF show.

Wrestler:	Reigns:	Date:	Place:	Notes:
Tyler Mane	1	September 23, 1994	Las Vegas, NV	Defeated Steve Ray to win the title
Inactive		September 23, 1994	Las Vegas, NV	Title retired.

== UWF Midget World Championship ==
The UWF Midget World Championship was a secondary title in the Universal Wrestling Federation. At the final UWF show, Little Tokyo beat the Karate Kid to become the first and only champion.

Wrestler:	Reigns:	Date:	Place:	Notes:
Little Tokyo	1	September 23, 1994	Las Vegas, NV	Defeated the Karate Kid to win the title
Inactive		September 23, 1994	Las Vegas, NV	Title retired.

== UWF North American Championship ==
The UWF North American Championship was a secondary title in the Universal Wrestling Federation. It was awarded to Tony Capone at a television taping and defended once before being retired.

Wrestler:	Reigns:	Date:	Place:	Notes:
Tony Capone	1	May 10, 1991	New York City, NY	Title awarded.
Vacant		September 16, 1991	Mount Vernon, NY	Title retired.

== UWF Southern States Championship ==
The UWF Southern States Championship was a secondary title in the Universal Wrestling Federation.

Wrestler:	Reigns:	Date:	Place:	Notes:
Bob Orton, Jr.	1	June 19, 1992	Spartanburg, SC	Win a 6-man tournament final.
Paul Orndorff	1	July 20, 1992	Spartanburg, SC	
inactive		October 19, 1992	(N/A)	Title vacated after Orndorff left promotion.

== UWF SportsChannel Television Championship ==
The UWF SportsChannel Television Championship was the premier title in the Universal Wrestling Federation from 1991 through 1992. The belt was introduced through a 16-man Tournament held during TV Tapings in April 1991 and June 1991. The winner of the tournament was crowned in a finals match at Beach Brawl. The title was named after SportsChannel, the network that aired UWF's weekly series Fury Hour.

Wrestler:	Reigns:	Date:	Place:	Notes:
Steve Williams	1	June 9, 1991	Palmetto, FL	Defeated Bam Bam Bigelow in tournament final
Stripped		June 19, 1992	Spartanburg, SC	Title vacated after Williams left promotion.

== UWF Women's World Championship ==
The UWF Women's World Championship was a title that could only be won by women in the Universal Wrestling Federation.

Wrestler:	Reigns:	Date:	Place:	Notes:
Rockin' Robin	1	June 9, 1991	Palmetto, FL	Defeated Candi Divine to win the title
Inactive		November 16, 1991	(N/A)	
Candi Devine	1	September 23, 1994	Las Vegas, NV	Defeated Tina Moretti to win the title
Miss Texas	1	December 5, 1994	Memphis, TN	Defeated Candi Divine on USWA card to win the title.
Inactive		December 5, 1994	(N/A)	Title retired.

== UWF World Heavyweight Championship ==
The UWF World Heavyweight Championship was intended to be the premier title of the Universal Wrestling Federation in 1994. It was awarded to Steve Williams on September 23, 1994, but it was not seen again after that show.

Wrestler:	Reigns:	Date:	Place:	Notes:
Steve Williams	1	September 23, 1994	Las Vegas, NV	Title awarded.
Inactive		September 23, 1994	Las Vegas, NV	Title retired.

== UWF World Tag Team Championship ==
The UWF World Tag Team Championship was a title in the Universal Wrestling Federation. The Killer Bees won the title at the UWF's final show, so the belts were never defended.

Wrestlers:	Reigns together:	Date:	Place:	Notes:
The Killer Bees (B. Brian Blair and Jim Brunzell)	1	September 23, 1994	Las Vegas, NV	Defeated The New Powers of Pain (The Warlord and Power Warrior) to win the titles
Inactive		September 23, 1994	Las Vegas, NV	Title retired.

== See also ==
- List of former Universal Wrestling Federation (Herb Abrams) personnel
