= Rockin' Robin (wrestler) =

American professional wrestler

Personal information
- Born: Robin Denise Smith; October 9, 1964 (age 61) Charlotte, North Carolina, U.S.
- Parent: Grizzly Smith (father)
- Family: Jake "The Snake" Roberts (half-brother); Sam Houston (brother); Baby Doll (ex-sister-in-law)

Professional wrestling career
- Ring name: Rockin' Robin
- Billed height: 5 ft 8 in (173 cm)
- Billed weight: 136 lb (62 kg)
- Billed from: Charlotte, North Carolina
- Trained by: Nelson Royal
- Debut: 1986
- Retired: 1992

Robin Denise Smith (born October 9, 1964), better known by her ring name Rockin' Robin, is an American retired professional wrestler. The daughter of Grizzly Smith, she is a second-generation wrestler. Her siblings are Sam Houston and half-brother, WWE Hall of Fame inductee Jake "The Snake" Roberts. Smith is best known for her appearances with the World Wrestling Federation (WWF) from 1987 to 1990, where she held the WWF Women's Championship.

== Professional wrestling career ==
=== Early career (1986–1987) ===
Smith grew up in a wrestling family and enjoyed going to wrestling shows, where she claims she and her siblings were treated like celebrities. Smith later decided to become a professional wrestler and trained, along with her sister-in-law Nickla Roberts (known by her ring name Baby Doll), under Nelson Royal. During 1987, Smith competed as Rockin' Robin in Wild West Wrestling, where she feuded with Debbie Combs and Sue Green.

=== World Wrestling Federation (1987–1990) ===
When the World Wrestling Federation decided to restart their women's division in the late 1980s, both Smith and Nickla Roberts tried out for the company, but the role ultimately went to Smith. Smith, as Rockin' Robin, debuted in the WWF in late 1987; her stage name was the same as the song from 1957. She competed at the first Survivor Series as a member of The Fabulous Moolah's team, which they were victorious. Throughout 1988, she feuded with Sensational Sherri for the WWF Women's Championship.

On October 7, 1988, she defeated Sensational Sherri, who had held the title for fifteen months prior, for the Women's Championship in Paris. At the Royal Rumble in 1989, she defended the title against Judy Martin. Smith defended the belt against Martin for the first six months of 1989. In the meantime, at WrestleMania V, she sang "America the Beautiful" to open the show. Smith continued to defend the Women's title against Martin throughout the summer of 1989. She held the championship until 1990, when she left the company. At that time, the title was retired by the WWF due to inactivity. Smith is still in possession of the title belt. The title remained inactive until 1993.

=== Late career (1990–1992) ===
Unlike some former WWF wrestlers, Smith was able to continue using her ring name after leaving the company because she owned the rights to it. In 1990, wrestler Hiro Matsuda, who had feuded with her father in the 1960s, picked Smith to tour for All Japan Women's Pro Wrestling. In Japan, Smith teamed with Luna Vachon. The Japanese bookers gave the girls a positive review for their work with the company.

In the United States, Smith defeated Peggy Lee Leather for the Ladies Major League Wrestling's International Championship. She still occasionally defended the WWF Women's Championship, even though the title was officially declared vacant by the World Wrestling Federation. In May 1991 she defended the WWF Women's Championship against "Japanese Women's Champion" Madusa Miceli on a Great Lakes Wrestling Association event. On June 9, 1991, she defeated Candi Devine in Herb Abrams's Universal Wrestling Federation to become the first UWF Women's Champion at UWF Beach Brawl. She also competed in the Ladies Professional Wrestling Association (LPWA), forming a tag team with Wendi Richter. She competed at LPWA's only pay-per-view, LPWA Super Ladies Showdown.

She retired in 1992.

On Sunday July 26th 2026, Rockin' Robin was at the Gathering with Jacqueline Moore signing autographs. Robin currently is not under a nostalgia contract with WWE but stars who are acting using their feats signals an appearance in the mainline WWE 2k games. Rockin' Robin has never appeared on a video game and this could change.

== Personal life ==
Smith and her brother Sam Houston are the children of Aurelian "Grizzly" Smith and were born after his first marriage dissolved. Her half-brother is Jake "The Snake" Roberts, who was born during their father's first marriage. Robin and her brothers all wrestled in the WWF at the same time in the 1980s, but their relationship was never mentioned on-screen at the request of Robin. Author and former National Wrestling Alliance president Howard Brody alleges in his book Swimming with Piranhas that Robin was a victim of sexual abuse at the hands of her father. According to Brody, Robin was removed from her father's care when her mother discovered what had been happening.

After leaving the WWF in 1990, Smith was married to a man named Harvey Zitron. Zitron was sentenced to 81 months in federal prison for 10 counts of filing false tax returns, identity theft and access device fraud. After divorcing, she moved to Louisiana and opened a telemarketing company that sold industrial chemicals and precious metals. During this time, Smith had a drinking problem but eventually was able to quit altogether.

In 2005, Smith's home and all of her belongings were destroyed by Hurricane Katrina. During the aftermath of the hurricane, she stayed with family in Baton Rouge, Louisiana. She now runs a real estate appraisal business in Hammond, Louisiana.

== Filmography ==
Television
| Year | Title | Role | Notes |
|---|---|---|---|
| 2021 | Dark Side of the Ring | Herself | Season 3 episode 6: "In the Shadow of Grizzly Smith" |
| 2024 | Dark Side of the Ring | Herself | Season 5 episode 8: "Sensational Sherri" |

== Championships and accomplishments ==
- Cauliflower Alley Club
  - Women's Wrestling (Retired) Award (2011)
- Great Lakes Wrestling Association
  - GLWA Women's Championship (1 time)
- Ladies Major League Wrestling
  - LMLW International Championship (1 time)
- Universal Wrestling Federation (Herb Abrams)
  - UWF Women's World Championship (1 time)
- Women's Wrestling Hall of Fame
  - Class of 2024
- World Wrestling Federation
  - WWF Women's Championship (1 time)
