= Brady Boone =

American professional wrestler (1958–1998)

- Peters as "Battle Kat" in the World Wrestling Federation in 1990

Personal information
- Born: Dean Robert Peters; August 22, 1958 Robbinsdale, Minnesota, U.S.
- Died: December 15, 1998 (aged 40) Tampa, Florida, U.S.
- Cause of death: Automobile accident

Professional wrestling career
- Ring name(s): Brady Boone; Battle Kat; Fire Cat; Lynxx; The Masked Firecat; Firecat Japanese Warrior
- Billed height: 5 ft 10 in (178 cm)
- Billed weight: 220 lb (100 kg)
- Billed from: Oregon City, Oregon
- Debut: 1984
- Retired: 1997

Dean Robert Peters (August 22, 1958 – December 15, 1998) was an American professional wrestler and referee. He performed with the World Wrestling Federation under the ring names Brady Boone and Battle Kat.

== Professional wrestling career ==
=== Early career (1984–1987) ===
Peters started his career in 1984, working for Don Owen's NWA Pacific Northwest Wrestling promotion. He wrestled under the ring name Brady Boone, and was billed as the cousin of Billy Jack Haynes. After teaming with Haynes, Boone won the Tag Team Championship twice in 1986; first with Coco Samoa on March 29, then with Ricky Santana on October 4. He also worked in Mid-Atlantic, Central States, Florida and All Japan Pro Wrestling in 1987.

=== World Wrestling Federation (1987–1988) ===
While wrestling for PNW, Peters (as Brady Boone) worked for the World Wrestling Federation from 1987 to early 1988. Boone began wrestling full-time for the WWF on July 2, 1987, used primarily as an upper-level opening match wrestler. Despite his role on television as a jobber, Boone won many matches on the house show circuit including defeats of Barry Horowitz, The Gladiator, José Estrada Sr. and ultimately compiled an overall singles record that included 19 wins that year. Meanwhile, on television Boone lost almost all of his encounters, but challenged The Honky Tonk Man for the Intercontinental Championship on the December 8, 1987 and May 10, 1988, episodes of Superstars. Boone was involved in one major angle on October 31, 1987, when he tagged with Scott Casey in a losing effort against Demolition. Following the match Demolition continued to attack Boone, leading first Billy Jack Haynes (Boone's kayfabe cousin) and then Ken Patera (Haynes' ally in a recent feud with Bobby Heenan) to make the save but also be beaten down. Boone was stretchered out as a part of that angle which led to Demolition feuding with the team of Haynes and Ken Patera plus various other allies. The following year Boone won an additional 24 matches, and finished his run with a victory over Steve Lombardi on September 12, 1988, in South Bend, Indiana.

=== All Japan Pro Wrestling and Florida (1988–1990) ===
On June 10, 1988, Boone returned All Japan Pro Wrestling and lost to Shunji Takano. After leaving WWF, Boone returned to Florida working only a few matches in 1988 and 1989. He defeated Iron Mike Sharpe for Trans World Wrestling Federation at the University of Maryland in College Park, Maryland on January 29, 1990.

=== World Wrestling Federation - Battle Kat (1990) ===
Brady Boone returned to the WWF on May 4, 1990, on a house show in a loss to Paul Diamond. He wrestled in numerous house shows and television matches between May and August. At a house show on September 13, 1990, Peters debuted as Battle Kat, a character who donned a cat mask and utilized his gymnastics background to emphasize his "cat-like" agility. He pinned The Brooklyn Brawler. Six days later, Battle Kat won his televised debut match over Bob Bradley, on the September 19 episode of Wrestling Challenge. Battle Kat remained undefeated on house shows and defeated Paul Diamond on the October 30 episode of Wrestling Challenge, and Boris Zhukov on house shows and Prime Time Wrestling before he was released from the WWF. Bob Bradley replaced Brady Boone in the Battle Kat character and was demoted to talent enhancement status, including a televised singles loss to, and teamed with Koko B. Ware in a loss to The Orient Express.

=== Independent circuit and All Japan (1991–1992) ===
After leaving the WWF, Peters took a brief hiatus from wrestling. He reappeared at the Universal Wrestling Federation's only pay-per-view, Beach Brawl on June 9, 1991, where he and Jim Cooper lost to The Blackhearts (Apocalypse and Destruction). As Fire Cat, he wrestled in the Florida-based Suncoast Pro Wrestling and won its Tag Team Championship with Jerry Lynn. After losing the title, Peters took another hiatus before debuting in All Japan Pro Wrestling under his Fire Cat name on March 4, 1992. He and Richard Slinger lost a tag team match to Lt. James Earl Wright and Sgt. Buddy Lee Parker.

=== World Championship Wrestling (1993–1994) ===
Peters signed with World Championship Wrestling in 1993, and debuted (as Brady Boone) on the December 7 episode of Saturday Night, losing a tag team match (with partner Scott Studd) to Pretty Wonderful (Paul Orndorff and Paul Roma). On the January 10, 1994 episode of Saturday Night, Boone lost to Steve Austin. After not appearing on television for several months, Boone wrestled his final match on the September 26 episode of WCW Pro, losing to Brian Pillman. After retiring as a wrestler, Boone remained with the company as a referee.

=== Independent circuit (1996–1997) ===
Boone came out of retirement in 1996 wrestling for NWA Florida. He wrestled as the Fire Cat losing to Rob Van Dam on November 8, 1996, in Gainesville, Florida. His last recorded match was a loss to Adrian Street on November 7, 1997.

== Death and legacy ==
On December 15, 1998, while driving home to Tampa, Florida from a WCW television taping in Orlando, Peters died in an automobile accident.

Despite being smaller than most wrestlers, Peters inspired several up-and-coming wrestlers with his athleticism, including Rob Van Dam. The two met while Peters was wrestling in Florida for Suncoast Pro Wrestling. Peters helped Van Dam during his early years in wrestling, and persuaded Giant Baba to allow Van Dam to tour with All Japan Pro Wrestling. The last time Van Dam saw Peters was also the only time he wrestled him. In tribute, Van Dam uses moves that Peters himself used.

== Personal life ==
Peters attended Robbinsdale High School in 1976 alongside fellow future wrestlers Curt Hennig, Tom Zenk and Rick Rude. John Nord and Nikita Koloff (class of 1977), and Barry Darsow (class of 1978). He is the uncle of former wrestler and WCW referee Johnny Boone. Married to Sherry Exum-Peterson (married December 1991) and the father to Kaley Mckennah Exum-Peters (born December 1992) and Jessy Diamond Exum-Peters (born May 1991)

== Championships and accomplishments ==
- Pacific Northwest Wrestling
  - NWA Pacific Northwest Tag Team Championship (2 times) – with Coco Samoa (1) and Ricky Santana (1)
- Suncoast Pro Wrestling
  - SPW Tag Team Championship (1 time) – with Jerry Lynn

== See also ==
- List of premature professional wrestling deaths
