= Craig Minervini =

American sports broadcaster

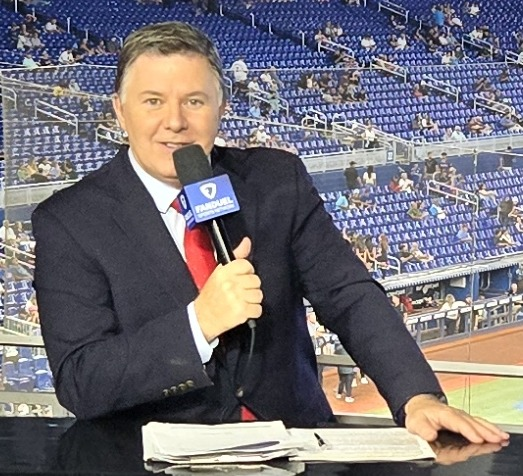
- Minervini at loanDepot Park in 2025
- Born: 1963 or 1964 (age 62–63)
- Education: Syracuse University; Commack High School South

Craig Minervini is an American sports broadcaster who is the television studio host for the MLB Local Media Miami Marlins broadcasts.

== Early life ==
Minervini grew up on Long Island. He attended Commack High School South and co-starred in a school play with Rosie O'Donnell. While attending Syracuse University, he was a broadcaster for the Syracuse Chiefs and finished third place in a Marv Albert sound-alike contest at Madison Square Garden.

== Wrestling ==
After graduating from Syracuse in 1985, Minervini joined the World Wrestling Federation as an announcer. He used the name Craig DeGeorge, borrowing his mother's maiden name. He later worked for Herb Abrams' UWF.

== Sports broadcasting ==
From 1989 to 1995, Minervini was a sports anchor at WPBF in West Palm Beach, Florida. In 1995 he called Roller Hockey International and junior hockey games for ESPN. In 1995, he joined WTVJ in Miami. In 2000, he called two Notre Dame football games on NBC as a fill-in for Tom Hammond. The following year he called the XFL's Sunday afternoon games on TNN. In 2003 he became the studio host for Fox Sports Net Florida's Florida Marlins and Florida Panthers telecasts. In 2010 he called United Football League games on Versus alongside Doug Flutie. In 2015, Minervini returned to Panthers broadcasts after a three-season absence.

== Personal life ==
Minervini's mother, Tina DeGeorge, was a painter. His brother, Richie Minervini, is a stand-up comic who owned the East Side Comedy Club in New York City. He was married to Martha Sugalski, a news reporter he met while they both worked at WPBF.
