= Candi Devine =

American professional wrestler (1959–2022)

Personal information
- Born: Candace Maria Rummel; January 1, 1958 Nashville, Tennessee, U.S.
- Died: February 9, 2022 (aged 64) Nashville, Tennessee, U.S.

Professional wrestling career
- Ring name(s): Candi Devine; Candi Divine; Christy Monroe; The Goddess; Lady Divine
- Billed height: 5 ft 10 in (178 cm)
- Billed weight: 147 lb (67 kg)
- Trained by: Don Fargo; Joey Rossi; Owen Henley
- Debut: 1980
- Retired: 1998

Candace Maria Rummel (January 1, 1958 – February 9, 2022) was an American professional wrestler better known by her ring name Candi Devine. She won singles championships in several promotions, most notably in the American Wrestling Association (AWA), where she held the AWA Women's Championship four times.

== Early life ==
Rummel was born in Nashville, Tennessee, on January 1, 1959. She began her wrestling career by running a fan club for Lanny Poffo (earning the nickname Fang Face because of her buck teeth) and working briefly as a ring girl for ICW in Kentucky, also publishing a newsletter called The Leap.

== Professional wrestling career ==
=== Early career (1980–1985) ===
Rummel made her debut in 1980, facing Ann Jeanette in Murfreesboro, Tennessee. She wrestled Diane Von Hoffman aka Moondog Fifi for two summers in Canada from 1983 to 1985. Moon Dog Fifi defeated Devine for her belt in 1994 in Evansville, Indiana.

Devine was badly injured in Memphis in 1985, when she and Amy Monroe collided head to head in a monkey-flip, fracturing her jaw and cheek; a lengthy recovery time and plastic surgery became needed to repair the damage and she briefly considered quitting wrestling.

=== American Wrestling Association (1985–1990) ===
Devine is best known for her time spent in the American Wrestling Association feuding with Sherri Martel. She held the AWA Women's Championship on four occasions.

She won a battle royal to fill the vacated title in 1984. Devine competed at the AWA's SuperClash, WrestleRock '86, Battle by the Bay and War in the Windy City cards. She was recognized as champion several times during that time period, mostly being awarded the belt by default as the number one contender (a common practice of the AWA), and trading it with Martel. Her feud with Martel carried over to Wild West Wrestling. She even tagged with Fabulous Lance a.k.a. Lance Von Erich against Martel and Iceman King Parsons.

She was very active in the AWA in late 1989 and throughout 1990 as part of the Team Challenge Series, wrestling in mixed tag team matches and in singles matches against Wendi Richter and Magnificent Mimi. She won the title the final time on December 6, 1989, when she defeated Judy Martin to determine the new Women's Champion after Richter vacated the belt.

=== Later career (1990–1998, 2005) ===
She also spent time in the Ladies Professional Wrestling Association as "The Goddess". She competed in the Women's Pro Wrestling organization in the early 1990s. She also was a 4 times World Wrestling Council Woman's Champion in Puerto Rico. Also competed at Global Wrestling Federation, Smoky Mountain Wrestling, and the United States Wrestling Association.

On June 9, 1991, Rockin' Robin defeated Devine to become the first UWF Women's Champion at UWF Beach Brawl, the company's first and only pay-per-view. Devine won the UWF Women's Championship in 1994 after she defeated Tina Moretti. She dropped the title to Miss Texas in December of that year. On March 25, 1995, she worked in a house show for the World Wrestling Federation losing to Alundra Blayze. Also worked for IWA Mid-South, Music City Wrestling, and Heartland Wrestling Association.

She retired from wrestling in 1998. Devine defeated Bambi on a USWO card on October 14, 2005.

== Personal life and death ==
Candi Devine resided in Nashville, where she worked as a physical trainer. She sued her long-term boyfriend, former wrestler Tom Burton, in a telecast of Divorce Court before Judge Lynn Toler that was originally aired on March 31, 2009. Devine sued Burton for $630 and accused Burton of running over her beloved cat with his car, killing it, which he denied. Judge Toler ruled in Devine's favor in the amount of $280. She eventually reconciled with Burton before he died on March 29, 2010. Her sister briefly wrestled as Rose Love.

In 2021, Devine suffered from a collapsed lung; additionally, she also suffered a number of seizures and dealt with a spine injury. Devine died on February 9, 2022, at the age of 64.

== Championships and accomplishments ==
- American Wrestling Association
  - AWA World Women's Championship (4 times)
- AWA Superstars of Wrestling
  - AWA World Women's Championship (1 time)
- Cauliflower Alley Club
  - Other honoree (1994)
- Great Lakes Wrestling Association
  - GLWA Women's Championship (1 time)
- Memphis Wrestling Hall of Fame
  - Class of 2022
- New Independent Wrestling Association
  - NIWA Women's Championship
- New Wrestling Association
  - NWA Divas Championship (1 time)
- Ozark Mountain Wrestling
  - OMW Women's Championship (1 time)
- Pomales Wrestling Entertainment
  - PWE World Women's Championship (3 times)
- United States Wrestling Association
  - USWA Women's Championship (1 time)
- Universal Wrestling Federation
  - UWF Women's World Championship (1 time)
- Western Ohio Wrestling
  - WOW Women's Championship (1 time)
- Windy City Pro Wrestling
  - WCPW Woman's Championship (3 times)
- World Wide Wrestling Alliance
  - WWWA Woman's Championship (1 time)
- World Wrestling Council
  - WWC Women's Championship (4 times)
