= Killer Bees (professional wrestling) =

Professional wrestling tag team

- Brian Blair (left), Jim Brunzell (right)

Tag team
- Members: Jim Brunzell; B. Brian Blair
- Billed heights: Brunzell: 5 ft 10 in (1.78 m); Blair: 6 ft 1 in (1.85 m)
- Combined billed weight: 465 lb (211 kg)
- Debut: 1985
- Disbanded: 1994
- Years active: 1985–1994

The Killer Bees were a tag team composed of "Jumpin" Jim Brunzell and B. Brian Blair in the World Wrestling Federation from 1985 to 1988 and later on the independent circuit. The team name is a play on the name of the Miami Dolphins' defensive unit known as the "Killer Bs", which was dominant and popular in the NFL at that time, as both team members' last name started with a "B", as did the last names of several Dolphin players.

== Before the Bees ==
Jim Brunzell made his debut in 1972, achieving most of his fame along with Greg Gagne as “the High Flyers" in the Minneapolis-based American Wrestling Association, where the two won the AWA World Tag Team Championship on two occasions.

B. Brian Blair was trained by Hiro Matsuda and made his debut in 1977 in the Florida-based promotion Championship Wrestling From Florida, competing in various territories (including the WWF) before 1985.

Blair and Brunzell were both considered stand-up wrestlers with a lot of potential during their Florida and AWA days, respectively.

== World Wrestling Federation ==
The two men were signed by the WWF as it continued its national expansion through 1985, debuting under the "Killer Bees" name. The name was inspired by the 1972 Dolphins' linebackers, whose names all began with the letter B and were the first to use the moniker. Blair was already a part of the company, wrestling as a singles competitor in 1984, mostly as "enhancement talent", but previously being a mid-card wrestler during 1983. The teaming of Blair and Brunzell was suggested by Hulk Hogan. Because Blair and Brunzell were similar in build, the team had a special gimmick referred to as "masked confusion" where both wrestlers would put on identical masks during matches to confuse the opponents and referee and usually win that way—despite this normally being a tactic used by heels. The “masked confusion" idea was given to Blair by Billy Red Lyons, who had used it in Maple Leaf Wrestling (as a singles wrestler).

One of the most amusing highlights of the team's career came in 1987 at a house show at the California University of Pennsylvania. With Blair unable to appear for the team's match against Demolition, he was replaced by S. D. Jones, an African-American journeyman who wore the Bees' black and yellow tights for the day. During the match, the two used the "masked confusion" tactic and the referee, as usual, pretended to be unable to tell the two apart, despite Brunzell being very light-skinned. The inverse would occur later, as Jones replaced Brunzell and teamed up with Blair in a Prime Time Wrestling TV taping, against Demolition.

The team debuted on June 17, 1985, defeating the team of Steve Lombardi and Dave Barbie. This was also Brunzell's first match in the WWF. After facing several teams, the Killer Bees started a long-running feud with the Hart Foundation (Bret Hart and Jim Neidhart). The Bees also had a running feud with the Funks (Hoss, Terry and Jimmy Jack). In August 1986, they faced Hoss and Jimmy Jack Funk in front of 70,000 people at The Big Event in Toronto, a card headlined by Hulk Hogan vs. Paul Orndorff. The team also received a couple of unsuccessful shots at WWF tag team champions the Dream Team.

The Killer Bees were a part of a battle royal involving wrestlers and NFL players at WrestleMania 2 and next got the spotlight at WrestleMania III, where they faced the Iron Sheik and Nikolai Volkoff, losing by disqualification because of the interference of Jim Duggan. After WrestleMania III, the Killer Bees moved on to a feud with WWF newcomers Demolition. By this point, the Bees' stock was clearly slipping in terms of their card placement, though they were one of two teams (with the Young Stallions) to "survive" the 10-team elimination match at the inaugural Survivor Series on Thanksgiving Day 1987. The Bees' last Wrestlemania appearance was at Wrestlemania IV, where they once again competed in a battle royal.

The Killer Bees’ last prominent appearance was at "WrestleFest" in summer 1988, where they lost to the Fabulous Rougeaus. In the summer of 1988 the Bees split up off-screen without any break up or announcement, and Brunzell and Blair returned, being used as "preliminary wrestlers" thus (at least temporarily) ending the yellow and black days of the Bees. The duo's last WWF match as a team came on August 24, 1988, against the Young Stallions.

Brunzell remained with the WWF into the 1990s, achieving many victories on the house show-circuit but failing to do so on TV.He was released by the WWF in 1993.

Blair remained with the WWF until early November 1988, usually scoring victories over preliminary wrestlers at both, TV tapings and untelevised events, but failing to beat more established wrestlers.

Blair and Brunzell later complained (and sued) about the WWF still merchandising product of them, without their permission or financial compensation.

Although they wrestled as faces throughout their WWF run, it did not stop rival heels from impersonating the Bees. During a televised WWF event at the Philadelphia Spectrum, two wrestlers dressed in Killer Bee masks and T-shirts appeared as lumberjacks during a lumberjack match between Hulk Hogan and "the Million Dollar Man" Ted DiBiase, frequently attacking Hogan until Hogan got the upper hand and unmasked one of the Bees only to reveal another mask beneath while the unidentified wrestler escaped.

After splitting up, Blair continued using his Killer Bee outfit and gimmick, and Brunzell would use Killer Bee-like outfits, though, both were not announced anymore as "half of the Killer Bees tag-team" as they used to when teaming up, indicating they were indeed separated.

== After the WWF ==
The Bees also re-appeared in an American Wrestling Association episode of All-Star Wrestling.

In the early 1990s, the Bees reformed in Herb Abrams' Universal Wrestling Federation, winning that promotion's tag team titles in 1994 before the federation folded. While there, they were unable to use the WWF-trademarked name "Killer Bees" and were instead known as "Masked Confusion". However, Blair was introduced as "Killer Bee B. Brian Blair" when he wrestled singles matches.

As of November 2017, Blair and Brunzell were still in high demand, working many Comic-Cons and independent autograph sessions. Both Blair and Brunzell have a new comic book series called the Killer Bees an animated true-life story about Blair and Brunzell's journey to become pro-wrestlers.

== Championships and accomplishments ==
- Universal Wrestling Federation
  - UWF World Tag Team Championship (1 time)
- World Wrestling Federation
  - Frank Tunney Sr. Memorial Tag Team Tournament
