= Reseda Country Club =

Former multipurpose venue in Reseda, California

- Interactive map of Reseda Country Club
- Former names: Wolf & Rissmiller's Country Club; Chuck Landis' Country Club
- Address: 18419 Sherman Way
- Location: Reseda, California
- Coordinates: 34.201417°N 118.534540°W
- Capacity: 1,000

Construction
- Opened: 1980
- Closed: 2000

Reseda Country Club was a nightclub and multi-purpose venue located on Sherman Way in Reseda, California.

The building started off as a Sav-On drug store in the 1950s and later became a music venue in 1980 when Chuck Landis purchased the site. It originally featured country music acts, hence its name.

The club was managed by concert promoter Jim Rissmiller from 1981 to 1984. Rissmiller was able to book premier shows of all types, including acts such as Jerry Garcia Band, B.B. King, Iggy Pop, James Brown, R.E.M., and U2. Other acts that performed at the Country Club were heavy metal bands such as Metallica, Slayer, Megadeth, Sepultura, Anthrax, Testament, W.A.S.P., Armored Saint, Fates Warning, Dark Angel, Sanctuary, Savatage, Bitch, Alcatrazz, Abattoir, and Malice, as well as punk rock bands like D.R.I., Bad Religion, the Circle Jerks, Social Distortion, T.S.O.L., the Cro-Mags, 7 Seconds, and Bad Brains. Prince held an afterparty concert at the venue following the 1987 MTV Video Music Awards.

Boxing cards were promoted at the venue from 1983 to 1998. Cards promoted by Dan Goossen most notably featured future champions Michael Nunn, Shane Mosley, Terry Norris, Wayne McCullough, and brothers Gabriel Ruelas and Rafael Ruelas. Universal Wrestling Federation (UWF) ran tapings of its weekly television series Fury Hour at the venue in 1990. Xtreme Pro Wrestling (XPW) ran professional wrestling events and television tapings at the venue in 1999.

The 1997 film Boogie Nights was shot at the venue, which appeared as the fictional club Hot Traxx.

The venue closed in 2000 and was replaced by the Spanish-language Christian church Restauración Reseda.
