= Steve Ray (wrestler) =

American retired professional wrestler

Personal information
- Born: Steven May Kansas City, Missouri, United States

Professional wrestling career
- Ring name: Steve Ray
- Billed height: 6 ft 3 in (191 cm)
- Billed weight: 251 lb (114 kg)
- Trained by: Bob Adonis
- Debut: 1987
- Retired: 1994

Steven May is an American retired professional wrestler, best known under the ring name Steve Ray in the late 1980s and early 1990s. Best known working for Herb Abrams's Universal Wrestling Federation and in Kansas City for Central States Wrestling.

== Professional wrestling career ==
Ray began his professional wrestling career in 1987 in Kansas City. In 1988, he was the last to win the NWA Central States Tag Team Championship with Rick Patterson before the promotion folded in 1989.

Ray joined the Universal Wrestling Federation in 1990. On the February 25 episode of UWF Fury Hour, at the Penta Hotel, Sunny Beach wrestled Bob Orton. Near the end of the bout, Orton's manager, "Coach" John Tolos, began attacking Beach while the referee was distracted and saw Steve Ray came to Beach's rescue. Cactus Jack followed Ray into the ring moments resulting in a four-way brawl. In the post-match interview, Tolos introduced Cactus Jack as the newest member of his stable and began a feud with the two young wrestlers lasting nearly three months.

The duo proved popular with the UWF audience, one of its few homegrown stars, and who quickly became the promotion's top "babyface" tag team. They had their first tag team match together on the March 4, 1991 episode of UWF Fury Hour against The Power Twins. The team was dubbed Wet N' Wild by Captain Lou Albano during an interview on "Capt. Lou's Corner" the following week. Allen and Ray finally met Bob Orton and Cactus Jack on the March 18 episode of UWF Fury Hour which ended in a time-limit draw. In April 1991, Ray was featured in The Wrestler.

Coach Tolos also recruited The Power Twins in his war against Wet N' Wild. The two teams met at Universal Studios on the May 13 episode of UWF Fury Hour. Ray initially wrestled both twins in a handicap match as his partner was supposedly stranded at the airport. Beach later appeared in the ring while The Power Twins were double-teaming his partner and attacked them with his suitcase. In the post-match interview, the team accused John Tolos of preventing Beach from arriving at the arena. Wet N' Wild later came to the rescue of Malia Hosaka when she was thrown out of the ring by The Blackhearts. On the June 3 episode of UWF Fury Hour, Wet N' Wild and The Power Twins fought to a double-disqualification at the Hotel Pennsylvania.

Allen and Ray's feud with Coach Tolos' stable was finally settled at UWF Beach Brawl, the promotion's first-ever PPV event, with Wet N' Wild defeating Bob Orton and Cactus Jack. Tolos was suspended in a cage over the ring to prevent the manager from interfering in the match. Cactus Jack, who was pinned by Allen, was blamed for the loss and attacked by Orton after the match. In spite of the PPVs failure, "Dr. Death" Steve Williams counted Allen among the most talented wrestlers on the card. Wet N' Wild were broken up shortly after due to personal issues between Ray and promoter Herb Abrams. Their last appearance on UWF television on the June 10 episode of UWF Fury Hour against Brian Donahue and The Messenger.

A few weeks after Beach Brawl, Wet N' Wild appeared in the Global Wrestling Federation. The two wore bright and flashy wrestling tights and brought inflatable beach balls with them to the ring. Their female fans were referred to as "beach bunnies". They were among the 24 tag teams competing in a two-day tournament at the Dallas Sportatorium to crown the first-ever GWF Tag Team Champions. They defeated Chico Torres and El Azteca in the opening rounds on July 26, 1991, but were eliminated in the second by The Royal Family (Jack Victory and Rip Morgan).

Ray returned to the UWF at the UWF Fury Hour television tapings on June 19, 1992, where he reunited with Sunny Beach to defeat Stone Cold and Johnny Kidd. On the July 13th episode of UWF Fury Hour, Wet N' Wild defeated The Marauder and The Viper.

Steve Ray took on Tyler Mane for the inaugural MGM Grand Championship at UWF Blackjack Brawl. Ray tried to perform a sunset flip on Mane, but Mane countered that with a seated senton and grabbed the top rope for leverage, thus pinning Ray to win the match. This would be Ray's last match and he retired from wrestling. Also the Blackjack Brawl would stand as the last event produced by UWF. UWF folded in 1996 after, Herb Abrams passed away.

== Personal life ==
Ray appeared on Dark Side of the Ring aired an episode focused on the life of Abrams titled "Cocaine & Cowboy Boots: The Herb Abrams Story" in May 2020. It was the third-highest rated episode in the show's then 14 episode history. Ray said that Herb Abrams was like a father figure to him.

== Championships and accomplishments ==
- Heart of America Sports Attractions
  - NWA Central States Tag Team Championship (1 time) – with Rick Patterson (1)
- Pro Wrestling Illustrated
  - PWI ranked him # 202 of the 500 best singles wrestlers of the PWI 500 in 1993
  - PWI ranked him # 314 of the 500 best singles wrestlers of the PWI 500 in 1992
  - PWI ranked him # 226 of the 500 best singles wrestlers of the PWI 500 in 1991
