= Spartanburg Memorial Auditorium =

Theatre and arena in South Carolina, United States

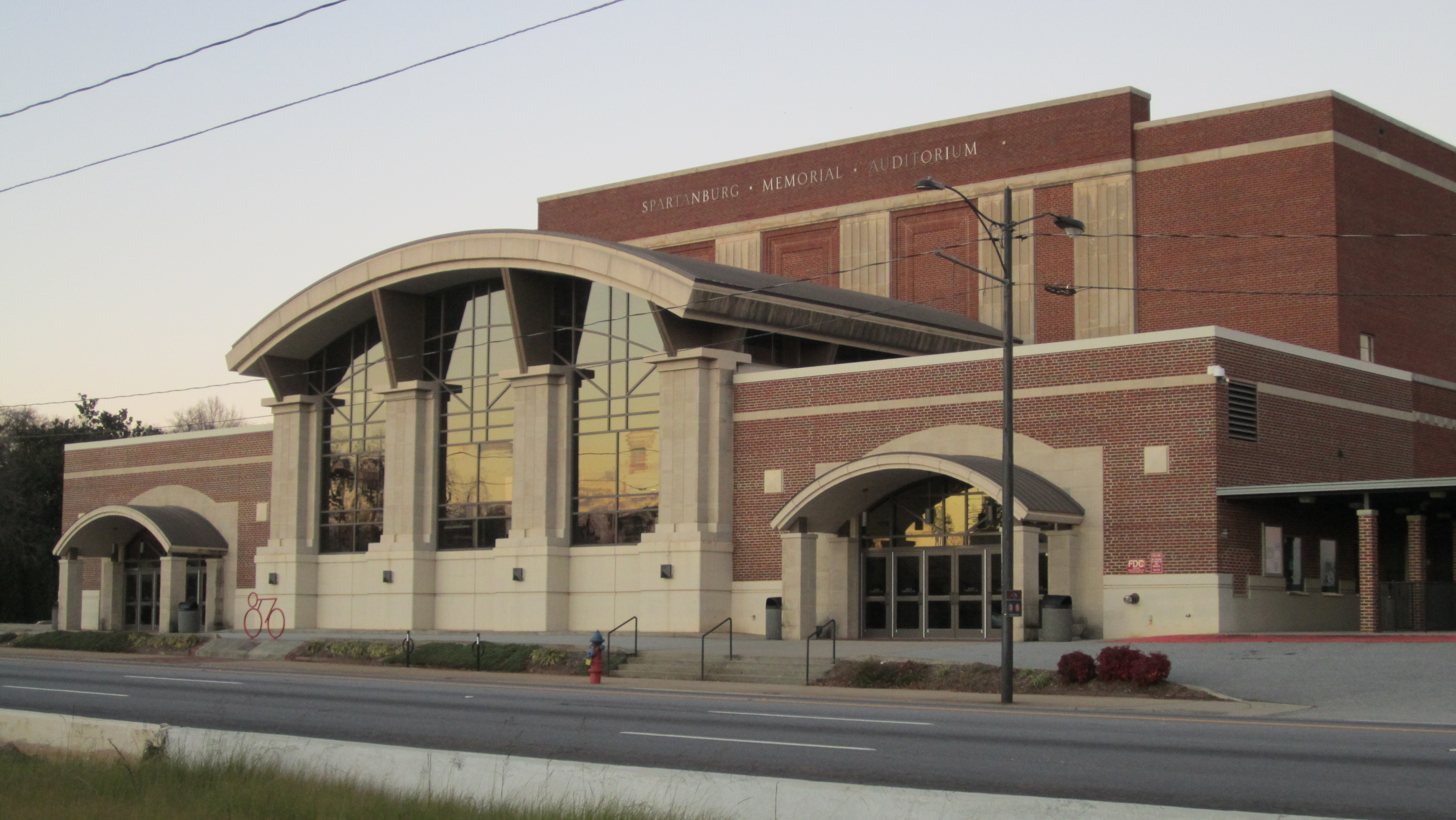
- Interactive map of Spartanburg Memorial Auditorium
- Address: 385 N Church St
- Location: Spartanburg, South Carolina
- Coordinates: 34°57′24.4656″N 81°56′7.458″W
- Owner: County of Spartanburg
- Type: Convention center Concert hall Arena

Construction
- Opened: December 1951

Website
- Official website

The Spartanburg Memorial Auditorium is a large-events venue in Spartanburg, South Carolina, located at 385 N Church St. It was built in 1951 and consists of a 3,217-seat theater with an 83'9"-by-86' stage and a 1,600-seat Exhibit Hall with 13,638 square feet (Dimensions: 83.5'-by-163'4") of exhibit space.

The auditorium, with 2,017 seats on the lower level and 1,200 in the two balconies (834 lower balcony and 366 upper balcony seats), is used for concerts, stage and family shows, and other events, and is one of South Carolina's largest theaters. The arena, also known as The Hall, is used for concerts, trade shows, banquets, wrestling, and other events.

== Performances ==
The Spartanburg Memorial Auditorium has hosted:

- the Supremes (1962)
- Ray Charles (1968, 1997)
- Billy Joel (1977)
- Black Crowes (1992)
- Phish (1994)
- Billy Ray Cyrus (1995)
- Dave Matthews (1997)
- 3 Doors Down (2001)
- Aaron Tippin (2003)
- Loretta Lynn (2007)
- Taylor Swift (2008)
- Jerry Seinfeld (2010)
- Ring of Honor (2011)
- the Fray with Colbie Caillat and Michelle Branch (2011)
- Halestorm (2016)
- WWE NXT (2017, 2018, 2019, and 2025)
- Billy Idol (2023)
- Insane Clown Posse and Juggalo Championship Wrestling (2025)
- Alice Cooper (2026)
- Bob Dylan (2026)
