= Universal Wrestling Federation (Herb Abrams) =

Professional wrestling company

- Type: Private
- Industry: Professional wrestling
- Founded: 1990
- Founder: Herb Abrams
- Defunct: 1994
- Fate: Assets acquired by Al Burke
- Headquarters: Marina del Rey, California
- Area served: Worldwide
- Products: Television, Merchandise
- Owners: NGK, Inc. (Herb Abrams)

Universal Wrestling Federation (UWF) was an American professional wrestling promotion owned by Herb Abrams that operated from 1990 to 1994. The company aired nationally on SportsChannel America, and later on Prime Ticket and ESPN2.

== History ==
Herb Abrams founded the UWF in 1990 to try to challenge Vince McMahon's World Wrestling Federation on a national level. He announced the promotion's formation at John Arezzi's Wrestling Fans Fantasy Weekend convention in August 1990. Despite having no experience in the wrestling business, Abrams was given a budget of $1 million by SportsChannel America to develop a weekly television series, which would become UWF Fury Hour. The first Fury Hour tapings were held at Reseda Country Club in fall 1990 and featured established stars such as Billy Jack Haynes, Bob Orton Jr., Brian Blair, Cactus Jack, Colonel DeBeers, Dan Spivey, David Sammartino, Don Muraco, Ivan Koloff, Ken Patera, Paul Orndorff, and Steve Williams. The top homegrown talent included "Wild Thing" Steve Ray and "Cutie Pie" Louie Spicolli. Bruno Sammartino and Lou Albano were hired as commentators.

The promotion held a taping in New York City at the New York Penta in January 1991 that became plagued with legal issues. The World Wrestling Federation sent cease and desist orders to the UWF after Honky Tonk Man and Rick Rude appeared on-camera. Both had recently walked out of the WWF but were still under contract to the company. Honky Tonk Man would later explain that the check he received from Abrams for this taping bounced, and he filed a formal complaint with the New York State Athletic Commission to get reimbursed.

Abrams hired Howard Brody, the owner of Ladies Major League Wrestling, to help him expand UWF into the Florida market in mid-1991. Following several house shows and a television taping at Universal Studios Florida, Brody was entrusted with finding a venue for the promotion's first pay per view event in June 1991. Brody suggested the Odeum Expo Center in Chicago. Abrams insisted on holding Beach Brawl at Manatee Civic Center in Palmetto, Florida. The pay per view was a disaster in both attendance and pay per view buys. Following Beach Brawl, Abrams ran one final television taping at War Memorial Auditorium before running out of fresh footage for Fury Hour. He struck a deal with Brody to use footage from Ladies Major League Wrestling to fulfill his content creation obligations to SportsChannel America, and the two parted ways in fall 1991.

Abrams only ran three more shows after his SportsChannel America deal expired in late 1991. This included: a television taping at Spartanburg Memorial Auditorium in June 1992 that aired on Prime Ticket as Thunder Hour; a television taping at All Seasons Arena as part of the North Dakota State Fair in July 1993, which never aired; and Blackjack Brawl at Las Vegas' MGM Grand Garden Arena, in September 1994. The latter show aired live on SportsChannel America, yet was a disaster in both attendance and critical reception. Abrams left for New York City to care for his ailing mother in December 1994, and wrestler Al Burke was put in charge of the promotion.

ESPN2 aired old episodes of Fury Hour and Thunder Hour in 1995, albeit in heavily edited form.

A February 1996 card called St. Valentine's Day Massacre was scheduled to be broadcast live from Grand Olympic Auditorium on Prime Sports Network, but was canceled. Zoogz Rift worked for the company during this time and claimed Abrams' cocaine addiction drained the company of money needed to produce such events. Abrams died of a cocaine-related heart attack in July 1996 while still in New York.

Al Burke claimed ownership of UWF's tape library following Abrams' death. In 2002, Burke partnered with Todd Okerlund of Classic Wrestling to repackage and license the library through DirecTV and ESPN Classic Canada.

Dark Side of the Ring aired an episode focused on the promotion titled "Cocaine & Cowboy Boots: The Herb Abrams Story" in May 2020. It was the third-highest rated episode in the show's history.

Jonathan Plombon released a biography on Abrams and his promotion titled Tortured Ambition: The Story of Herb Abrams and the UWF in September 2021.

== Programming ==
=== Fury Hour ===
Fury Hour was the company's weekly television show that aired Monday nights on SportsChannel America from 1990 to 1991. It was taped at various locations including Reseda Country Club, New York Penta, Universal Studios Florida, and War Memorial Auditorium. It was briefly revived as Thunder Hour in 1992 on Prime Ticket with episodes taped at Spartanburg Memorial Auditorium.

=== Beach Brawl ===
Beach Brawl was the only pay-per-view event in the company's history and was held on June 7, 1991 at the Manatee Civic Center in Palmetto, Florida. The event was headlined by a match between Steve Williams and Bam Bam Bigelow, which was the final round match of a sixteen-man tournament for the crowning of the first UWF SportsChannel Television Champion. Williams defeated Bigelow to become the first SportsChannel Television Champion. The event was an overall failure with a low buyrate of 0.1 and a crowd of 500 in attendance at the arena.

=== Blackjack Brawl ===
The company aired a live television special called Blackjack Brawl on September 23, 1994 on SportsChannel America, which was UWF's last major attempt to secure a major television deal and survive in the professional wrestling industry. The event was held at the MGM Grand Garden Arena in Las Vegas, Nevada. Like its predecessor Beach Brawl, the event saw very low attendance of just 600 fans and received negative response from critics and audiences for weak quality, weakly performed matches, nonsense booking and weak commentary. The event featured nine championship matches, with two vacant championships being decided at the event, and seven new championships being contested at the event. The event was headlined by a UWF World Heavyweight Championship match between defending champion Steve Williams and Sid Vicious. This would stand as the promotion's final event.

=== St. Valentine's Day Massacre (cancelled) ===
St. Valentine's Day Massacre was a planned live television special that would have been broadcast on Prime Sports Network on February 10, 1996. The event would have been held at Grand Olympic Auditorium in Los Angeles, and featured the promised rematch from Blackjack Brawl between Steve Williams and Sid Vicious in a Steel Cage match for the UWF World Heavyweight Championship.

== Championships ==
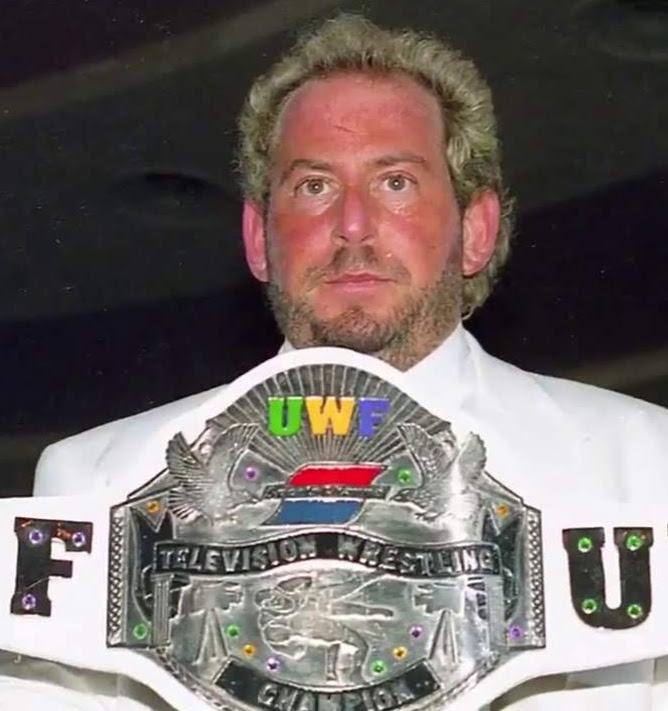
Herb Abrams holding the UWF SportsChannel Television Championship at New York Penta in May 1991

- UWF Americas Championship (1994)
- UWF Intercontinental Heavyweight Championship (1993)
- UWF Israeli Championship (1991)
- UWF Junior Heavyweight Championship (1994)
- UWF MGM Grand Championship (1994)
- UWF Midget World Championship (1994)
- UWF North American Championship (1991)
- UWF Southern States Championship (1992)
- UWF SportsChannel Television Championship (1991-1992)
- UWF Women's World Championship (1991, 1994)
- UWF World Heavyweight Championship (1994)
- UWF World Tag Team Championship (1994)

== Home video ==
In 1992, the UWF issued six VHS releases in the United States through Best Film & Video Corporation: Beach Brawl, Tag Team Tandems, The Best of Paul Orndorff, The Lumberjack Match, The Steel Cage Match, and Wrestling's Greatest Champions. In 1993, the UWF released six volumes of PAL videos in Germany through Summit International Pictures under the "Wrestling Super Champs" banner. They were all compilations of Fury Hour matches. The same six "Wrestling Super Champs" volumes were re-released in Germany through Jünger Verlag under the "Super Wrestling" banner.

Recent years have seen the emergence of UWF DVDs in Australia through Payless Entertainment. Each of the seven Region 4 DVDs contains one episode of Fury Hour. The DVDs include Body Slammin, Grand Slam, Grudge Matches, It's War, Tag Team Madness, The Main Event, and Wrestling Wars. In Germany, a Region 0 DVD titled "Wrestling Super 4 Champs" was released containing two episodes of Fury Hour. Also in Germany, the "Wrestling Super Champs" VHS compilations were re-released on DVD in six volumes as "American History of Wrestling - UWF".

== Awards ==
- Wrestling Observer Newsletter
  - 1990 - Worst Television Announcer (Herb Abrams)
  - 1991 - Worst Promotion of the Year (UWF)
  - 1991 - Worst Television Show (Fury Hour)
  - 1991 - Most Obnoxious (Herb Abrams)
  - 1994 - Worst Major Wrestling Show (Blackjack Brawl)

== See also ==
- List of former Universal Wrestling Federation (Herb Abrams) personnel
