= Herb Abrams =

American professional wrestling promoter and commentator

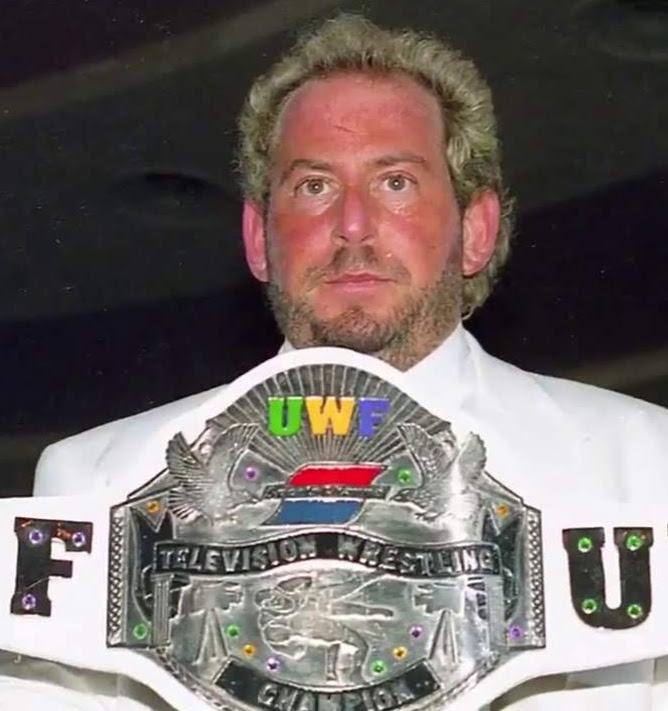
- Abrams in 1991
- Born: Herbert Charles Abrams; July 9, 1955; Queens, New York, U.S.
- Died: July 23, 1996 (aged 41); Manhattan, New York, U.S.
- Burial place: New Montefiore Cemetery, West Babylon, New York
- Occupations: Professional wrestling promoter and commentator
- Known for: Founder of the Universal Wrestling Federation
- Spouse: Murry Lee (m. 1989; div. 1994)

Herbert Charles Abrams (July 9, 1955 – July 23, 1996), also known by the nickname Mr. Electricity, was an American professional wrestling promoter from Queens, New York, who founded the Universal Wrestling Federation (UWF) in 1990.

== Early life ==
Herbert Charles Abrams was born on July 9, 1955, in Queens, New York, the oldest child of his mother Sonia (née Hoffman) and father, Abram Abrams who was a salesman of women's dresses. He attended William Cullen Bryant High School in Long Island City, New York.

== Career ==
In 1976, Abrams approached photographer Bill Apter while he was shooting Superstar Billy Graham on the streets of New York. He told Apter to spread word that any wrestlers who made an appearance at his father's clothing store in Flushing, Queens, would be allowed to take dresses for their wives as compensation.

Abrams moved to Los Angeles and started his first business, Network '9' Limited in 1983. Abrams later started a chain of plus-size clothing stores for women called I'm a Big Girl Now in 1988. Abrams was married in 1989, and his father died that same year at the age of 64.

== Professional wrestling career ==
Abrams founded the Universal Wrestling Federation (UWF) in 1990, receiving $1 million from SportsChannel America to produce the weekly television program UWF Fury Hour. In August 1990, during a press conference announcing the UWF's launch, Abrams was asked how he expected to succeed in the wrestling business with no prior experience in it. Abrams responded: "What they're looking for, I have, and that's the Hollywood glitz". Abrams ran his first television tapings at Reseda Country Club in Reseda, California, that fall; the venue's owners would later sue Abrams for money owed. Abrams soon gained a reputation for chronically failing to pay venue owners, and even his own wrestlers.

As the UWF's head booker, Abrams was often criticized for the promotion's inconsistent storylines, and matches that lacked clean-cut finishes. For the first 11 episodes of Fury Hour he was an on-screen commentator alongside Bruno Sammartino, for which the readers of Wrestling Observer Newsletter voted him Worst Television Announcer of 1990. Prior to earning that dubious distinction, Abrams had used a jobber on Fury Hour named "Davey Meltzer"—an obvious jab at journalist Dave Meltzer, Wrestling Observer Newsletter editor-in-chief and publisher. Abrams was replaced on commentary by Craig DeGeorge, but stayed on-screen as an interviewer.

After the UWF's SportsChannel America deal expired without extension in September 1991, Abrams' live show schedule went from regular, to sporadic. In 1994, coming off a divorce, Abrams made one final, grand attempt to make an impact in professional wrestling: the television special UWF Blackjack Brawl, broadcast live from Las Vegas, Nevada's MGM Grand Arena. While the MGM Grand Arena seated approximately 17,000, Abrams sold only approximately 300 tickets, making the event an enormous commercial failure. Abrams moved back to New York City soon afterward to care for his ailing mother, and never promoted another UWF event.

== Death ==
Abrams died on July 23, 1996, at St. Vincent's Hospital in Manhattan, New York of a heart attack while in police custody. Before his death, police had found Abrams in his Manhattan office naked and covered in baby oil, destroying furniture with a baseball bat. Abrams' autopsy showed he had cocaine and valium in his system when he died. He was buried in New Montefiore Cemetery in West Babylon, New York.

Abrams' ex-girlfriend said that during the last few years of his life, he had experienced paranoia when high on cocaine. Allegedly, Abrams owed various people money, and insisted on destroying furniture to find non-existent "bugging devices" he believed were secretly recording him.

== Legacy ==
Dark Side of the Ring aired an episode focused on the life of Abrams titled "Cocaine & Cowboy Boots: The Herb Abrams Story" in May 2020.

Jonathan Plombon released a biography on Abrams titled Tortured Ambition: The Story of Herb Abrams and the UWF in September 2021.

== Awards and accomplishments ==
- Wrestling Observer Newsletter awards
  - Worst Television Announcer (1990)
  - Most Obnoxious (1991)
