= Survivor Series (1997) =

World Wrestling Federation pay-per-view event

- Promotional poster featuring silhouettes of The New Hart Foundation
- Promotion: World Wrestling Federation
- Date: November 9, 1997
- City: Montreal, Quebec, Canada
- Venue: Molson Centre
- Attendance: 20,593
- Buy rate: 284,000
- Tagline: Gang Rulz

Pay-per-view chronology
← Previous; Badd Blood: In Your House	Next → D-Generation X: In Your House

Survivor Series chronology
← Previous; 1996	Next → 1998

WWE in Canada chronology
← Previous; In Your House 16: Canadian Stampede	Next → Breakdown: In Your House

The 1997 Survivor Series was a professional wrestling pay-per-view (PPV) event produced by the American promotion World Wrestling Federation (WWF, renamed WWE in 2002) and presented by Milton Bradley's Karate Fighters. It was the 11th annual Survivor Series event and took place on Sunday, November 9, 1997, at the Molson Centre in Montreal, Quebec, Canada. This was the first Survivor Series to not be held during the week of Thanksgiving in the United States, as it was held over two weeks before the American holiday, as well as the first held outside of the US. The event centered on the Survivor Series match, a tag team elimination match that pits teams of multiple wrestlers against each other.

Seven matches were contested on the event's card, including four Survivor Series matches. The main event saw Bret Hart defend the WWF Championship against Shawn Michaels. It was the last of three WWF Championship matches between the two men, who had previously headlined the 1992 Survivor Series and 1996's WrestleMania XII together. Michaels won the title controversially when WWF owner Vince McMahon ordered referee Earl Hebner to end the match as soon as Michaels locked Hart into Hart's own signature submission hold, the Sharpshooter, even though Hart had not submitted. This incident became infamously known as the Montreal Screwjob and marked Hart's last appearance on WWF/E programming until 2006. This was also the last time that Hart held a title in the company until May 2010, and the last time he headlined a WWF/E pay-per-view until SummerSlam 2010.

The event's tagline, "Gang Rulz", referred to the various wrestling stables that feuded with each other heading into this event. A video package during this event aired immediately before the Hart vs. Michaels match and featured the first use of the "WWF Attitude" scratch logo.

== Production ==
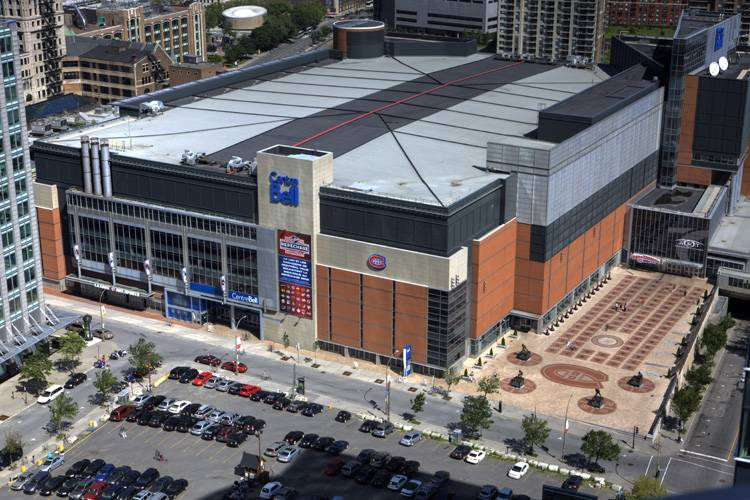
The 11th annual Survivor Series event was held in Montreal, Quebec, Canada at the Molson Centre (pictured as Bell Centre, renamed in 2002), which was the first Survivor Series held outside of the United States.

=== Background ===
Survivor Series is an annual professional wrestling pay-per-view (PPV) event, produced every November by the American promotion World Wrestling Federation (WWF, renamed WWE in 2002) since 1987, generally held around Thanksgiving in the United States. In what has become the second longest-running PPV event in history (behind WWE's WrestleMania), it is one of the promotion's original four PPVs, along with WrestleMania, SummerSlam, and Royal Rumble, referred to as the "Big Four", and was considered one of the "Big Five" PPVs with the addition of King of the Ring in 1993. The event is traditionally characterized by having Survivor Series matches, which are tag team elimination matches that typically pit teams of four or five wrestlers against each other.

The 11th Survivor Series event was scheduled to be held on Sunday, November 9, 1997, at the Molson Centre in Montreal, Quebec, Canada. This was the first Survivor Series to not be held during the week of Thanksgiving in the United States, as it was held over two weeks before the American holiday. It was also the first Survivor Series to be held outside of the United States. The event's tagline, "Gang Rulz", referred to the various wrestling stables that feuded with each other heading into this event.

=== Storylines ===
Survivor Series consisted of professional wrestling matches involving wrestlers from pre-existing feuds and storylines that played out on Raw is War — WWF's primary television program.

The storyline feud between Bret Hart and Shawn Michaels began after Michaels became the number one contender to the WWF Championship by defeating The Undertaker in the first Hell in a Cell match at Badd Blood: In Your House. On the following night's episode of Raw is War, while Michaels and his friend Hunter Hearst Helmsley were blurting out insults to Vince McMahon by the announce table, Hart and members of The Hart Foundation appeared, with Hart calling Michaels "nothing more than a degenerate" before challenging Triple H to a match later that night. Hart later lost to Helmsley by countout after Michaels hit him with Sweet Chin Music while Hart was arguing with Helmsley's bodyguard Chyna.

== Event ==
Immediately after the "Stone Cold" Steve Austin vs. Owen Hart match and before the Bret Hart vs. Shawn Michaels match, a video package was aired featuring promos from Ahmed Johnson, The Undertaker, Bret Hart, Faarooq, Austin, and Michaels discussing their real-life athletic backgrounds and injuries suffered, ending with Bret Hart saying "Try lacing my boots", and finally with the first use of the "WWF Attitude" scratch logo displayed on the screen. In later re-airings of the video package, Hart's tagline was replaced by Austin (also saying "Try lacing my boots").

In the main event, Shawn Michaels defeated Bret Hart at 19:58 and became the new WWF Champion, after Michaels put Hart into Hart's finishing hold, the submission manoeuvre known as the Sharpshooter. Even though Hart did not submit, and was on the point of reversing the move into a Sharpshooter of his own as part of a sequence arranged prior to the event, referee Earl Hebner called for the bell immediately and timekeeper Mark Yeaton rang it on direct orders from Vince McMahon. Michaels was declared the winner.

== Reception ==
In 2015, Kevin Pantoja of 411Mania gave the event a rating of 6.0 [Average], stating, "Shortly after the WWE Network launched, I watched this show and disliked it. Looking at it now, it’s pretty good. The Survivor Series matches, except for the DOA one, are all relatively fun. It also gets the score bumped up a bit more due to the historical value here. The main event, while not classic, kind of has to be seen by any and every wrestling fan."

== Aftermath ==
The controversial ending surrounding Shawn Michaels defeating Bret Hart by "submission" and winning the WWF Championship due to Vince McMahon ordering referee Earl Hebner to call for the bell without Hart actually submitting, became infamously known as the Montreal Screwjob. Hart, who had expected the match to end with him retaining his title on a disqualification finish, left the WWF immediately after the incident and moved to World Championship Wrestling (WCW) over a month later, where he eventually became a two-time WCW World Heavyweight Champion, a four-time WCW United States Heavyweight Champion, and one half of the WCW World Tag Team Champions before retiring in 2000 due to a severe concussion. He would not make an on-screen return to the company until 2010—which had been renamed as World Wrestling Entertainment (WWE) in 2002—when he and Michaels called a truce and buried the hatchet on the Montreal Screwjob, while also having been inducted into the WWE Hall of Fame four years prior. The incident also resulted in the exits of Jim Neidhart, Rick Rude, and Brian Adams (also known as Crush) from the company in support of Hart.

After Survivor Series, Shawn Michaels began his third reign as WWF Champion. He entered a feud with Ken Shamrock over the WWF Championship, which culminated at D-Generation X: In Your House, where Michaels retained the title after Shamrock won by disqualification after being attacked by D-Generation X (DX) members Triple H and Chyna. Michaels would eventually lose the WWF Championship to "Stone Cold" Steve Austin at WrestleMania XIV, before going on a four-year hiatus due to a back injury suffered during a casket match against The Undertaker at the 1998 Royal Rumble. Michaels would make his in-ring return at SummerSlam 2002.

After winning the Intercontinental Championship, "Stone Cold" Steve Austin entered into a feud with "The Rock" Rocky Maivia over the title after The Rock stole Austin's title belt following an ambush from The Nation of Domination on the November 17 episode of Raw is War. Austin retained the Intercontinental Championship and regained the belt by defeating The Rock at D-Generation X: In Your House. However, Austin would forfeit the title to The Rock the next night on Raw is War, with the sole intention of going after the WWF Championship, before hitting The Rock with a Stone Cold Stunner.

Vince McMahon's actions of screwing Bret Hart from the WWF Championship marked the beginning of the "Mr. McMahon" character, the tyrannical CEO of WWF. In 1998, McMahon began a legendary rivalry with "Stone Cold" Steve Austin.

The events of the Montreal Screwjob repeated at the following year's Survivor Series, albeit scripted this time, when The Rock locked Mankind in the Sharpshooter before Mr. McMahon ordered the referee to call for the bell, "screwing" Mankind and awarding the then-vacant WWF Championship to The Rock.

== Results ==
No.	Results	Stipulations	Times
1	The New Age Outlaws (Road Dogg and Billy Gunn) and The Godwinns (Henry O. Godwinn and Phineas I. Godwinn) defeated The Headbangers (Mosh and Thrasher) and The New Blackjacks (Blackjack Windham and Blackjack Bradshaw)	4-on-4 Survivor Series match^{1}	15:25
2	The Truth Commission (The Jackyl, The Interrogator, Sniper, and Recon) defeated The Disciples of Apocalypse (Crush, Chainz, 8-Ball, and Skull)	4-on-4 Survivor Series match^{2}	9:59
3	Team Canada (The British Bulldog, Jim Neidhart, Doug Furnas, and Phil Lafon) defeated Team USA (Vader, Goldust, Marc Mero, and Steve Blackman) (with Sable)	4-on-4 Survivor Series match^{3}	17:05
4	Kane (with Paul Bearer) defeated Mankind	Singles match	9:27
5	Ken Shamrock, Ahmed Johnson, and The Legion of Doom (Hawk and Animal) defeated The Nation of Domination ("The Rock" Rocky Maivia, Faarooq, Kama Mustafa, and D'Lo Brown)	4-on-4 Survivor Series match^{4}	20:28
6	"Stone Cold" Steve Austin defeated Owen Hart (c) (with The British Bulldog, Jim Neidhart, Doug Furnas, and Phil Lafon)	Singles match for the WWF Intercontinental Championship	4:03
7	Shawn Michaels defeated Bret Hart (c) by submission	Singles match for the WWF Championship; This was the Montreal Screwjob.	19:58
(c) / – the champion(s) heading into the match

=== Survivor Series matches ===
^1

Eliminated	Wrestler	Eliminated by	Method	Time
1	Henry O. Godwinn	Bradshaw	Pinfall	3:52
2	Blackjack Windham	Phineas I. Godwinn	Pinfall	5:14
3	Mosh	Billy Gunn	Pinfall	8:42
4	Phineas I. Godwinn	Thrasher	Pinfall	12:38
5	Blackjack Bradshaw	Road Dogg	Pinfall	13:44
6	Thrasher	Billy Gunn	Pinfall	15:25
Survivors:	The New Age Outlaws (Road Dogg and Billy Gunn)			

^2

Eliminated	Wrestler	Eliminated by	Method	Time
1	Chainz	The Interrogator	Pinfall	1:18
2	The Jackyl	8-Ball	Pinfall	2:50
3	Recon	Skull	Pinfall	5:18
4	Skull	Sniper	Pinfall	6:30
5	8-Ball	The Interrogator	Pinfall	8:50
6	Sniper	Crush	Pinfall	9:46
7	Crush	The Interrogator	Pinfall	9:59
Sole Survivor:	The Interrogator			

^3

Eliminated	Wrestler	Eliminated by	Method	Time
1	Steve Blackman	N/A	Countout	5:16
2	Jim Neidhart	Vader	Pinfall	6:53
3	Phil Lafon	Vader	Pinfall	8:28
4	Marc Mero	Doug Furnas	Pinfall	11:18
5	Goldust	N/A	Countout	16:26
6	Doug Furnas	Vader	Pinfall	16:54
7	Vader	The British Bulldog	Pinfall	17:05
Sole Survivor:	The British Bulldog			

^4

Eliminated	Wrestler	Eliminated by	Method	Time
1	Hawk	"The Rock" Rocky Maivia	Pinfall	2:09
2	Faarooq	Ahmed Johnson	Pinfall	4:53
3	Ahmed Johnson	"The Rock" Rocky Maivia	Pinfall	6:09
4	Kama Mustafa	Animal	Pinfall	10:44
5	Animal	N/A	Countout	14:12
6	D'Lo Brown	Ken Shamrock	Submission	16:54
7	Rocky Maivia	Ken Shamrock	Submission	20:28
Sole Survivor:	Ken Shamrock			

== Other on-screen personnel ==
English Commentators

- Jim Ross
- Jerry "The King" Lawler

Spanish Commentators

- Carlos Cabrera
- Tito Santana

French Commentators

- Raymond Rougeau
- Jean Brassard
- Jacques Rougeau, Sr.

Other

- Vince McMahon
- Sgt. Slaughter
- Gerald Brisco
- Pat Patterson

Ring announcer

- Albert DeFrusia

Referees

- Mike Chioda
- Jack Doan
- Earl Hebner
- Jim Korderas
- Tim White

Interviewers

- Michael Cole
- Kevin Kelly

== See also ==
- Professional wrestling in Canada

== Sources ==
- "2007 Wrestling Almanac & Book of Facts". Wrestling's Historical Cards. Kappa Publishing. 2007. p. 99.
- hoffco-inc.com - Survivor Series '97 review (Archived)
- 1997 Survivor Series Results
