= Survivor Series match =

Professional wrestling elimination match

The Survivor Series match is a professional wrestling tag team elimination match held in WWE. The match typically sees two teams pitted against each other and members of the teams are eliminated one-by-one until one entire team is eliminated. Members of the winning team are deemed the "survivors", and in some cases, there may only be one survivor. Although the matches typically see four or five people per team, there have been as many as 10 on a team, and as few as one on a team in a pre-stipulated handicap situation. The match is typically held at WWE's annual Survivor Series pay-per-view and livestreaming event with only the 1998, 2002, 2022, 2023, 2024 and 2025 events not including the namesake match.

Through the 2021 Survivor Series, there have been 89 Survivor Series matches, of which only eleven have included women. The shortest match was a 1-versus-4 match which saw Big Show eliminate Big Boss Man, Mideon, Prince Albert, and Viscera in 1:26. The 2016 event saw the only Survivor Series match to last over 50 minutes. While the match typically has two teams against each other, the 2019 event had two Survivor Series matches, one for the men and women each, in which three teams went against each other.

== History ==
In 2001 following WWF's acquisition of World Championship Wrestling, the Survivor Series match featured WWF against The Alliance. During 2003 and 2004 with the WWE brand extension, the event saw each Raw and SmackDown having their own match. In 2005 and 2008, there was only one match which saw Raw against SmackDown. However, 2016, 2017, and 2018 saw the Raw against SmackDown format return, with one men's, one men's tag team (except 2017), and one women's match. The 2019 event introduced three-way Survivor Series matches for both men and women with the addition of the NXT brand (along with its sister brand, NXT UK) in addition to both the Raw and SmackDown brands.

2008 featured the first women's Survivor Series match, since 1995. After several years of no women's Survivor Series matches, in 2013, there was the third woman's match. 2014 featured an additional women's match. Every event since 2016 has featured a women's match.

From 2022 to 2024 there were no Survivor Series matches held as the Survivor Series event instead featured WarGames matches. In 2025 two elimination tag matches, referred to as "Survivor Series style matches", were held as part of NXT vs. TNA Showdown, and another was held on the episode of Friday Night Smackdown broadcast before Survivor Series: WarGames.

== Matches ==
No.	Event	Date	Venue	Location	Brand	Type	Result	Length	Ref.
1	1987	November 26, 1987	Richfield Coliseum	Richfield Township, Ohio	Brand extension not in effect	5 on 5	Brutus Beefcake, Jake Roberts, Jim Duggan, Randy Savage and Ricky Steamboat (with Miss Elizabeth) defeated Dangerous Danny Davis, Harley Race, Hercules, The Honky Tonk Man and Ron Bass (with Bobby Heenan and Jimmy Hart)	24:00	
2	1987	November 26, 1987	Richfield Coliseum	Richfield Township, Ohio	Brand extension not in effect	5 on 5	The Fabulous Moolah, The Jumping Bomb Angels (Itsuki Yamazaki and Noriyo Tateno), Rockin' Robin and Velvet McIntyre defeated Dawn Marie, Donna Christanello, The Glamour Girls (Leilani Kai and Judy Martin) and Sensational Sherri (with Jimmy Hart)	20:00	
3	1987	November 26, 1987	Richfield Coliseum	Richfield Township, Ohio	Brand extension not in effect	10 on 10; Tag Team	The British Bulldogs (Davey Boy Smith and Dynamite Kid), The Killer Bees (B. Brian Blair and Jim Brunzell), The Fabulous Rougeaus (Jacques Rougeau and Raymond Rougeau), Strike Force (Rick Martel and Tito Santana), The Young Stallions (Jim Powers and Paul Roma) defeated The Bolsheviks (Boris Zhukov and Nikolai Volkoff), Demolition (Ax and Smash), The Dream Team (Dino Bravo and Greg Valentine), The Hart Foundation (Bret Hart and Jim Neidhart) and The Islanders (Haku and Tama) (with Bobby Heenan, Mr. Fuji, Jimmy Hart, Johnny Valiant and Slick)	37:00	
4	1987	November 26, 1987	Richfield Coliseum	Richfield Township, Ohio	Brand extension not in effect	5 on 5	André the Giant, Butch Reed, King Kong Bundy, One Man Gang and Rick Rude (with Bobby Heenan and Slick) defeated Bam Bam Bigelow, Don Muraco, Hulk Hogan, Ken Patera and Paul Orndorff (with Oliver Humperdink)	22:00	
5	1988	November 24, 1988	Richfield Coliseum	Richfield Township, Ohio	Brand extension not in effect	5 on 5	The Blue Blazer, Brutus Beefcake, Jim Brunzell, Sam Houston and The Ultimate Warrior defeated The Honky Tonk Man, Ron Bass, Dangerous Danny Davis, Bad News Brown and Greg Valentine (with Jimmy Hart)	17:50	
6	1988	November 24, 1988	Richfield Coliseum	Richfield Township, Ohio	Brand extension not in effect	10 on 10; Tag Team	The Powers of Pain (The Barbarian and The Warlord), The Rockers (Marty Jannetty and Shawn Michaels), The British Bulldogs (Davey Boy Smith and Dynamite Kid), Hart Foundation (Bret Hart and Jim Neidhart) and The Young Stallions (Jim Powers and Paul Roma) defeated Demolition (Ax and Smash), The Brain Busters (Arn Anderson and Tully Blanchard), The Bolsheviks (Boris Zhukov and Nikolai Volkoff), The Fabulous Rougeaus (Jacques Rougeau and Raymond Rougeau) and The Conquistadors (Dos and Uno) (with Bobby Heenan, Mr. Fuji, Slick and Jimmy Hart)	42:12	
7	1988	November 24, 1988	Richfield Coliseum	Richfield Township, Ohio	Brand extension not in effect	5 on 5	André the Giant, Dino Bravo, Mr. Perfect, Rick Rude and Harley Race (with Bobby Heenan and Frenchy Martin) defeated Jake Roberts, Jim Duggan, Ken Patera, Scott Casey and Tito Santana	30:03	
8	1988	November 24, 1988	Richfield Coliseum	Richfield Township, Ohio	Brand extension not in effect	5 on 5	Hercules, Hillbilly Jim, Koko B. Ware, Hulk Hogan and Randy Savage (with Miss Elizabeth) defeated Akeem, Big Boss Man, Haku, The Red Rooster and Ted DiBiase (with Bobby Heenan, Slick and Virgil)	29:10	
9	1989	November 23, 1989	Rosemont Horizon	Rosemont, Illinois	Brand extension not in effect	4 on 4	The Dream Team (Dusty Rhodes, Brutus Beefcake, The Red Rooster and Tito Santana) defeated The Enforcers (Big Boss Man, Bad News Brown, Rick Martel and The Honky Tonk Man) (with Jimmy Hart and Slick)	22:02	
10	1989	November 23, 1989	Rosemont Horizon	Rosemont, Illinois	Brand extension not in effect	4 on 4	The King's Court (Randy Savage, Canadian Earthquake, Dino Bravo and Greg Valentine) (with Jimmy Hart and Queen Sherri) defeated The 4x4s: (Jim Duggan, Bret Hart, Ronnie Garvin and Hercules)	23:25	
11	1989	November 23, 1989	Rosemont Horizon	Rosemont, Illinois	Brand extension not in effect	4 on 4	The Hulkamaniacs (Hulk Hogan, Jake Roberts, Ax and Smash) defeated The Million Dollar Team (Ted DiBiase, The Warlord, The Barbarian and Zeus) (with Virgil and Mr. Fuji)	27:32	
12	1989	November 23, 1989	Rosemont Horizon	Rosemont, Illinois	Brand extension not in effect	4 on 4	The Rude Brood (Rick Rude, Mr. Perfect, Jacques and Raymond Rougeau) (with The Genius and Jimmy Hart) defeated Roddy's Rowdies (Roddy Piper, Jimmy Snuka, Bushwhacker Luke and Bushwhacker Butch)	21:27	
13	1989	November 23, 1989	Rosemont Horizon	Rosemont, Illinois	Brand extension not in effect	4 on 4	The Ultimate Warriors (The Ultimate Warrior, Jim Neidhart, Shawn Michaels and Marty Jannetty) defeated The Heenan Family (Bobby Heenan, André the Giant, Haku and Arn Anderson)	20:28	
14	1990	November 22, 1990	Hartford Civic Center	Hartford, Connecticut	Brand extension not in effect	4 on 4	The Warriors (Animal, Hawk, The Texas Tornado and The Ultimate Warrior) defeated The Perfect Team (Ax, Crush, Mr. Perfect and Smash) (with Bobby Heenan and Mr. Fuji)	14:20	
15	1990	November 22, 1990	Hartford Civic Center	Hartford, Connecticut	Brand extension not in effect	4 on 4	The Million Dollar Team (The Honky Tonk Man, Greg Valentine, Ted DiBiase and The Undertaker) (with Brother Love, Jimmy Hart and Virgil) defeated The Dream Team (Bret Hart, Dusty Rhodes, Koko B. Ware and Jim Neidhart)	13:54	
16	1990	November 22, 1990	Hartford Civic Center	Hartford, Connecticut	Brand extension not in effect	4 on 4	The Visionaries (Hercules, Paul Roma, Rick Martel and The Warlord) (with Slick) defeated The Vipers (Jake Roberts, Jimmy Snuka, Marty Jannetty and Shawn Michaels)	17:42	
17	1990	November 22, 1990	Hartford Civic Center	Hartford, Connecticut	Brand extension not in effect	4 on 4	The Hulkamaniacs (Big Boss Man, Hulk Hogan, Jim Duggan and Tugboat) defeated The Natural Disasters (The Barbarian, Dino Bravo, Earthquake and Haku) (with Bobby Heenan and Jimmy Hart)	14:49	
18	1990	November 22, 1990	Hartford Civic Center	Hartford, Connecticut	Brand extension not in effect	4 on 4	The Alliance (Butch, Luke, Nikolai Volkoff and Tito Santana) defeated The Mercenaries (Boris Zhukov, Sgt. Slaughter, Sato and Tanaka) (with Mr. Fuji and General Adnan)	10:52	
19	1990	November 22, 1990	Hartford Civic Center	Hartford, Connecticut	Brand extension not in effect	3 on 5	Hulk Hogan, Tito Santana and The Ultimate Warrior defeated Hercules, Paul Roma, Rick Martel, Ted DiBiase and The Warlord (with Virgil and Slick)	09:07	
20	1991	November 27, 1991	Joe Louis Arena	Detroit, Michigan	Brand extension not in effect	4 on 4	The Mountie, Ric Flair, Ted DiBiase and The Warlord (with Harvey Wippleman, Jimmy Hart, Mr. Perfect and Sensational Sherri) defeated Bret Hart, The British Bulldog, Roddy Piper and Virgil	22:48	
21	1991	November 27, 1991	Joe Louis Arena	Detroit, Michigan	Brand extension not in effect	4 on 4	Jim Duggan, Sgt. Slaughter, The Texas Tornado and Tito Santana defeated The Berzerker, Col. Mustafa, Hercules and Skinner (with General Adnan and Mr. Fuji)	14:19	
22	1991	November 27, 1991	Joe Louis Arena	Detroit, Michigan	Brand extension not in effect	4 on 4	The Nasty Boys (Brian Knobbs and Jerry Sags) and The Beverly Brothers (Beau Beverly and Blake Beverly) (with The Genius and Jimmy Hart) defeated The Bushwhackers (Bushwhacker Butch and Bushwhacker Luke) and The Rockers (Marty Jannetty and Shawn Michaels)	23:06	
23	1991	November 27, 1991	Joe Louis Arena	Detroit, Michigan	Brand extension not in effect	3 on 3	Big Boss Man and The Legion of Doom (Animal and Hawk) defeated Irwin R. Schyster and The Natural Disasters (Earthquake and Typhoon) (with Jimmy Hart)	15:21	
24	1992	November 25, 1992	Richfield Coliseum	Richfield Township, Ohio	Brand extension not in effect	4 on 4	The Nasty Boys (Brian Knobbs and Jerry Sags) and The Natural Disasters (Earthquake and Typhoon) defeated Money Inc. (Irwin R. Schyster and Ted DiBiase) and The Beverly Brothers (Beau Beverly and Blake Beverly) (with The Genius and Jimmy Hart)	15:50	
25	1993	November 24, 1993	Boston Garden	Boston, Massachusetts	Brand extension not in effect	4 on 4	The 1–2–3 Kid, Marty Jannetty, Randy Savage and Razor Ramon defeated Adam Bomb, Diesel, Irwin R. Schyster and Rick Martel (with Harvey Wippleman)	26:58	
26	1993	November 24, 1993	Boston Garden	Boston, Massachusetts	Brand extension not in effect	4 on 4	The Hart Family (Bret Hart, Bruce Hart, Keith Hart and Owen Hart) (with Stu Hart) defeated Shawn Michaels and His Knights (The Black Knight, The Blue Knight, The Red Knight and Shawn Michaels)	30:57	
27	1993	November 24, 1993	Boston Garden	Boston, Massachusetts	Brand extension not in effect	4 on 4	The Bushwhackers (Bushwhacker Butch and Bushwhacker Luke) and Men on a Mission (Mabel and Mo) (with Oscar) defeated Bam Bam Bigelow, Bastion Booger, and The Headshrinkers (Fatu and Samu) (with Afa and Luna Vachon)	10:58	
28	1993	November 24, 1993	Boston Garden	Boston, Massachusetts	Brand extension not in effect	4 on 4	The All-Americans (Lex Luger, Steiner Brothers (Rick Steiner and Scott Steiner) and The Undertaker) (with Paul Bearer) defeated The Foreign Fanatics (Crush, Quebecer Jacques, Ludvig Borga and Yokozuna) (with Jim Cornette, Johnny Polo and Mr. Fuji)	27:59	
29	1994	November 23, 1994	Freeman Coliseum	San Antonio, Texas	Brand extension not in effect	5 on 5	The Bad Guys (The 1-2-3 Kid, The British Bulldog, Fatu, Razor Ramon and Sione) (with Afa and Lou Albano) defeated The Teamsters (Diesel, Jeff Jarrett, Jim Neidhart, Owen Hart and Shawn Michaels)	21:45	
30	1994	November 23, 1994	Freeman Coliseum	San Antonio, Texas	Brand extension not in effect	4 on 4	The Royal Family (Cheesy, Jerry Lawler, Queasy and Sleazy) defeated Clowns R' Us (Dink the Clown, Doink the Clown, Pink the Clown and Wink the Clown)	16:05	
31	1994	November 23, 1994	Freeman Coliseum	San Antonio, Texas	Brand extension not in effect	5 on 5	The Million Dollar Team (Bam Bam Bigelow, Jimmy Del Ray, King Kong Bundy, Tatanka and Tom Prichard) (with Jim Cornette and Ted DiBiase) defeated Guts and Glory (Adam Bomb, Bart Gunn, Billy Gunn, Lex Luger and Mabel) (with Oscar)	23:21	
32	1995	November 19, 1995	USAir Arena	Landover, Maryland	Brand extension not in effect	4 on 4	1-2-3 Kid, Dr. Tom Prichard, Rad Radford and Skip (with Sunny and Ted DiBiase) defeated Barry Horowitz, Bob Holly, Hakushi and Marty Jannetty	18:45	
33	1995	November 19, 1995	USAir Arena	Landover, Maryland	Brand extension not in effect	4 on 4	Aja Kong, Bertha Faye, Lioness Asuka and Tomoko Watanabe (with Harvey Wippleman) defeated Alundra Blayze, Chaparita Asari, Kyoko Inoue and Sakie Hasegawa	10:01	
34	1995	November 19, 1995	USAir Arena	Landover, Maryland	Brand extension not in effect	4 on 4	The Darkside (Fatu, Henry O. Godwinn, Savio Vega and The Undertaker) (with Paul Bearer) defeated The Royals (Hunter Hearst Helmsley, Isaac Yankem, DDS, Jerry Lawler and King Mabel) (with Sir Mo)	14:21	
35	1995	November 19, 1995	USAir Arena	Landover, Maryland	Brand extension not in effect	4 on 4	Ahmed Johnson, The British Bulldog, (with Jim Cornette) Shawn Michaels, and Sycho Sid (with Ted DiBiase) defeated Dean Douglas, Owen Hart, Razor Ramon and Yokozuna (with Mr. Fuji)	27:24	
36	1996	November 17, 1996	Madison Square Garden	New York City, New York	Brand extension not in effect	4 on 4	Aldo Montoya, Bart Gunn, Bob Holly and Jesse James defeated Billy Gunn, Justin Bradshaw, Salvatore Sincere and The Sultan (with The Iron Sheik and Uncle Zebekiah)	10:46	
37	1996	November 17, 1996	Madison Square Garden	New York City, New York	Brand extension not in effect	4 on 4	Doug Furnas, Henry O. Godwinn, Phil Lafon and Phineas I. Godwinn (with Hillbilly Jim) defeated The British Bulldog, Leif Cassidy, Marty Jannetty and Owen Hart (with Clarence Mason)	20:41	
38	1996	November 17, 1996	Madison Square Garden	New York City, New York	Brand extension not in effect	4 on 4	Jake Roberts, Marc Mero (with Sable), Rocky Maivia, and The Stalker defeated Crush, Goldust (with Marlena), Jerry Lawler and Hunter Hearst Helmsley	23:44	
39	1996	November 17, 1996	Madison Square Garden	New York City, New York	Brand extension not in effect	4 on 4	Diesel, Faarooq, Razor Ramon and Vader (with Clarence Mason and Jim Cornette) vs. Flash Funk, Jimmy Snuka, Savio Vega and Yokozuna ended in a no contest	09:48	
40	1997	November 9, 1997	Molson Centre	Montreal, Quebec, Canada	Brand extension not in effect	4 on 4	The Godwinns (Henry O. Godwinn and Phineas I. Godwinn) and New Age Outlaws (Billy Gunn and Road Dogg) defeated The Headbangers (Mosh and Thrasher) and The New Blackjacks (Blackjack Bradshaw and Blackjack Windham)	15:25	
41	1997	November 9, 1997	Molson Centre	Montreal, Quebec, Canada	Brand extension not in effect	4 on 4	The Truth Commission (The Interrogator, The Jackyl, Recon and Sniper) defeated The Disciples of Apocalypse (8-Ball, Chainz, Crush and Skull)	09:25	
42	1997	November 9, 1997	Molson Centre	Montreal, Quebec, Canada	Brand extension not in effect	4 on 4	Team Canada (The British Bulldog, Doug Furnas, Jim Neidhart and Phil Lafon) defeated Team USA (Goldust, Marc Mero, Steve Blackman and Vader) (with Sable)	17:05	
43	1997	November 9, 1997	Molson Centre	Montreal, Quebec, Canada	Brand extension not in effect	4 on 4	Ken Shamrock, Ahmed Johnson and The Legion of Doom (Animal and Hawk) defeated The Nation of Domination (Faarooq, D'Lo Brown, Kama Mustafa and Rocky Maivia)	20:28	
44	1999	November 14, 1999	Joe Louis Arena	Detroit, Michigan	Brand extension not in effect	4 on 4	D'Lo Brown, The Godfather, and The Headbangers (Mosh and Thrasher) defeated The Acolytes (Bradshaw and Faarooq) and Dudley Boyz (Bubba Ray Dudley and D-Von Dudley)	09:36	
45	1999	November 14, 1999	Joe Louis Arena	Detroit, Michigan	Brand extension not in effect	4 on 4	Gangrel, Mark Henry, Steve Blackman and Val Venis defeated The British Bulldog and The Mean Street Posse (Joey Abs, Pete Gas and Rodney)	09:08	
46	1999	November 14, 1999	Joe Louis Arena	Detroit, Michigan	Brand extension not in effect	1 on 4	Big Show defeated Big Boss Man, Mideon, Prince Albert and Viscera	01:26	
47	1999	November 14, 1999	Joe Louis Arena	Detroit, Michigan	Brand extension not in effect	4 on 4	The Hollys (Crash Holly and Hardcore Holly) and Too Cool (Grand Master Sexay and Scotty 2 Hotty) defeated Edge & Christian and Hardy Boyz (Jeff Hardy and Matt Hardy) (with Terri Runnels)	14:27	
48	2000	November 19, 2000	Ice Palace	Tampa, Florida	Brand extension not in effect	4 on 4	The Radicalz (Eddie Guerrero, Chris Benoit, Dean Malenko and Perry Saturn) (with Terri) defeated Billy Gunn, Chyna, K-Kwik and Road Dogg	12:43	
49	2000	November 19, 2000	Ice Palace	Tampa, Florida	Brand extension not in effect	4 on 4	Dudley Boyz (Bubba Ray Dudley and D-Von Dudley) and Hardy Boyz (Jeff Hardy and Matt Hardy) defeated Edge & Christian and Right to Censor (Bull Buchanan and The Goodfather) (with Val Venis)	10:05	
50	2001	November 18, 2001	Greensboro Coliseum	Greensboro, North Carolina	Brand extension not in effect	Winner Take All; 5 on 5	Team WWF (Chris Jericho, Big Show, Kane, The Rock and The Undertaker) defeated The Alliance (Booker T, Kurt Angle, Rob Van Dam, Shane McMahon and Stone Cold Steve Austin)	44:57	
51	2003	November 16, 2003	American Airlines Center	Dallas, Texas	SmackDown	5 on 5	Team Angle (Bradshaw, Chris Benoit, Hardcore Holly, John Cena and Kurt Angle) defeated Team Lesnar (A-Train, Big Show, Brock Lesnar, Nathan Jones and Matt Morgan)	13:15	
52	2003	November 16, 2003	American Airlines Center	Dallas, Texas	Raw	5 on 5	Team Bischoff (Chris Jericho, Christian, Mark Henry, Randy Orton and Scott Steiner) (with Eric Bischoff, Theodore Long and Stacy Keibler) defeated Team Austin (Booker T, Bubba Ray Dudley, D-Von Dudley, Rob Van Dam and Shawn Michaels) (with Stone Cold Steve Austin)	27:27	
53	2004	November 14, 2004	Gund Arena	Cleveland, Ohio	SmackDown	4 on 4	Team Guerrero (Big Show, Eddie Guerrero, John Cena and Rob Van Dam) defeated Team Angle (Carlito, Kurt Angle, Luther Reigns and Mark Jindrak) (with Jesús)	12:26	
54	2004	November 14, 2004	Gund Arena	Cleveland, Ohio	Raw	4 on 4	Team Orton (Chris Benoit, Chris Jericho, Maven and Randy Orton) defeated Team Triple H (Batista, Edge, Gene Snitsky and Triple H) (with Ric Flair)	24:31	
55	2005	November 27, 2005	Joe Louis Arena	Detroit, Michigan	Raw; SmackDown	5 on 5	Team SmackDown! (Batista, Bobby Lashley, John "Bradshaw" Layfield, Randy Orton and Rey Mysterio) defeated Team Raw (Big Show, Carlito, Chris Masters, Kane and Shawn Michaels)	24:01	
56	2006	November 26, 2006	Wachovia Center	Philadelphia, Pennsylvania	Raw; SmackDown; ECW	4 on 4	Dusty Rhodes, Ric Flair, Ron Simmons and Sgt. Slaughter (with Arn Anderson) defeated The Spirit Squad (Johnny, Kenny, Mikey and Nicky) (with Mitch)	10:31	
57	2006	November 26, 2006	Wachovia Center	Philadelphia, Pennsylvania	Raw; SmackDown; ECW	5 on 5	Team DX (CM Punk, Jeff Hardy, Matt Hardy, Shawn Michaels and Triple H) defeated Team Rated-RKO (Edge, Johnny Nitro, Mike Knox, Gregory Helms and Randy Orton) (with Kelly Kelly and Melina)	11:30	
58	2006	November 26, 2006	Wachovia Center	Philadelphia, Pennsylvania	Raw; SmackDown; ECW	5 on 5	Bobby Lashley, Kane, John Cena, Rob Van Dam and Sabu defeated Big Show, Finlay, Montel Vontavious Porter, Test and Umaga (with Armando Alejandro Estrada)	12:35	
59	2007	November 18, 2007	American Airlines Arena	Miami, Florida	Raw; SmackDown; ECW	4 on 5	Jeff Hardy, Kane, Rey Mysterio, and Triple H defeated Big Daddy V, Finlay, Mr. Kennedy, Montel Vontavious Porter and Umaga (with Matt Striker)	22:08	
60	2008	November 23, 2008	TD Banknorth Garden	Boston, Massachusetts	Raw; SmackDown; ECW	5 on 5	Team HBK (The Great Khali, JTG, Rey Mysterio, Shad Gaspard and Shawn Michaels) (with Ranjin Singh) defeated Team JBL (John "Bradshaw" Layfield, John Morrison, Kane, The Miz and Montel Vontavious Porter)	18:13	
61	2008	November 23, 2008	TD Banknorth Garden	Boston, Massachusetts	Raw; SmackDown; ECW	5 on 5	Team Raw (Beth Phoenix, Candice Michelle, Jillian Hall, Kelly Kelly and Mickie James) (with Santino Marella) defeated Team SmackDown (Maria, Maryse, Michelle McCool, Natalya and Victoria)	09:39	
62	2008	November 23, 2008	TD Banknorth Garden	Boston, Massachusetts	Raw; SmackDown; ECW	5 on 5	Team Orton (Cody Rhodes, Mark Henry, Randy Orton, Shelton Benjamin and William Regal) (with Layla, Manu and Tony Atlas) defeated Team Batista (Batista, CM Punk, Kofi Kingston, Matt Hardy and R-Truth)	16:13	
63	2009	November 22, 2009	Verizon Center	Washington, D.C.	Raw; SmackDown; ECW	5 on 5	Team Miz (Dolph Ziggler, Drew McIntyre, Jack Swagger, The Miz and Sheamus) defeated Team Morrison (Evan Bourne, Finlay, John Morrison, Matt Hardy and Shelton Benjamin)	20:52	
64	2009	November 22, 2009	Verizon Center	Washington, D.C.	Raw; SmackDown; ECW	5 on 5	Team Kingston (Christian, Kofi Kingston, Mark Henry, Montel Vontavious Porter and R-Truth) defeated Team Orton (CM Punk, Cody Rhodes, Randy Orton, Ted DiBiase and William Regal)	20:47	
65	2009	November 22, 2009	Verizon Center	Washington, D.C.	Raw; SmackDown; ECW	5 on 5	Team Mickie (Eve Torres, Gail Kim, Kelly Kelly, Melina, and Mickie James) defeated Team Michelle (Alicia Fox, Beth Phoenix, Jillian Hall, Layla, and Michelle McCool)	10:38	
66	2010	November 21, 2010	American Airlines Arena	Miami, Florida	SmackDown	5 on 5	Team Mysterio (Big Show, Chris Masters, Kofi Kingston, Montel Vontavious Porter and Rey Mysterio) defeated Team Del Rio (Alberto Del Rio, Cody Rhodes, Drew McIntyre, Jack Swagger and Tyler Reks)	18:12	
67	2011	November 20, 2011	Madison Square Garden	New York City, New York	Brand extension not in effect	5 on 5	Team Barrett (Cody Rhodes, Dolph Ziggler, Hunico, Jack Swagger and Wade Barrett) defeated Team Orton (Kofi Kingston, Mason Ryan, Randy Orton, Sheamus and Sin Cara)	22:10	
68	2012	November 18, 2012	Bankers Life Fieldhouse	Indianapolis, Indiana	Brand extension not in effect	5 on 5	Brodus Clay, Justin Gabriel, Rey Mysterio, Sin Cara and Tyson Kidd (with Cameron and Naomi) defeated The Prime Time Players (Darren Young and Titus O'Neil), Primo and Epico and Tensai (with Rosa Mendes)	18:27	
69	2012	November 18, 2012	Bankers Life Fieldhouse	Indianapolis, Indiana	Brand extension not in effect	5 on 5	Team Ziggler (Alberto Del Rio, Damien Sandow, David Otunga, Dolph Ziggler and Wade Barrett) (with Ricardo Rodriguez) defeated Team Foley (Daniel Bryan, Kane, Kofi Kingston, The Miz and Randy Orton) (with Mick Foley)	23:43	
70	2013	November 24, 2013	TD Garden	Boston, Massachusetts	Brand extension not in effect	5 on 5	The Shield (Dean Ambrose, Roman Reigns and Seth Rollins) and The Real Americans (Antonio Cesaro and Jack Swagger) (with Zeb Colter) defeated Cody Rhodes and Goldust, Rey Mysterio and The Usos (Jey Uso and Jimmy Uso)	23:23	
71	2013	November 24, 2013	TD Garden	Boston, Massachusetts	Brand extension not in effect	7 on 7	Total Divas (The Bella Twins (Brie Bella and Nikki Bella), Eva Marie, The Funkadactyls (Cameron and Naomi), JoJo and Natalya) defeated True Divas (AJ Lee, Aksana, Alicia Fox, Kaitlyn, Rosa Mendes, Summer Rae and Tamina Snuka)	11:29	
72	2014	November 23, 2014	Scottrade Center	St. Louis, Missouri	Brand extension not in effect	4 on 4	Team Fox (Alicia Fox, Emma, Naomi, and Natalya) (with Tyson Kidd) defeated Team Paige (Cameron, Layla, Paige, and Summer Rae)	14:35	
73	2014	November 23, 2014	Scottrade Center	St. Louis, Missouri	Brand extension not in effect	5 on 5	Team Cena (Big Show, Dolph Ziggler, Erick Rowan, John Cena, and Ryback) defeated Team Authority (Kane, Luke Harper, Mark Henry, Rusev, and Seth Rollins) (with Jamie Noble, Joey Mercury, Lana, Stephanie McMahon, and Triple H)	43:25	
74	2015	November 22, 2015	Philips Arena	Atlanta, Georgia	Brand extension not in effect	5 on 5	The Dudley Boyz (Bubba Ray Dudley and D-Von Dudley), Goldust, Neville, and Titus O'Neil defeated Bo Dallas, The Cosmic Wasteland (Konnor, Stardust and Viktor) and The Miz	18:10	
75	2015	November 22, 2015	Philips Arena	Atlanta, Georgia	Brand extension not in effect	5 on 5	The Usos (Jey Uso and Jimmy Uso), The Lucha Dragons (Kalisto and Sin Cara) and Ryback defeated King Barrett, Sheamus and The New Day (Big E, Kofi Kingston, and Xavier Woods)	17:33	
76	2016	November 20, 2016	Air Canada Centre	Toronto, Ontario, Canada	Raw; SmackDown	5 on 5	Team Raw (Alicia Fox, Bayley, Charlotte Flair, Nia Jax, and Sasha Banks) (with Dana Brooke) defeated Team SmackDown (Alexa Bliss, Becky Lynch, Carmella, Naomi, and Natalya)	17:30	
77	2016	November 20, 2016	Air Canada Centre	Toronto, Ontario, Canada	Raw; SmackDown	10 on 10; Tag Team	Team Raw (Cesaro and Sheamus, Enzo Amore and Big Cass, Luke Gallows and Karl Anderson, The New Day (Big E and Kofi Kingston), and The Shining Stars (Epico and Primo) (with Xavier Woods) defeated Team SmackDown (American Alpha (Chad Gable and Jason Jordan), Breezango (Fandango and Tyler Breeze), Heath Slater and Rhyno, The Hype Bros (Mojo Rawley and Zack Ryder), and The Usos (Jey Uso and Jimmy Uso)	18:55	
78	2016	November 20, 2016	Air Canada Centre	Toronto, Ontario, Canada	Raw; SmackDown	5 on 5	Team SmackDown (AJ Styles, Bray Wyatt, Dean Ambrose, Randy Orton, and Shane McMahon) (with James Ellsworth) defeated Team Raw (Braun Strowman, Chris Jericho, Kevin Owens, Roman Reigns, and Seth Rollins)	52:55	
79	2017	November 19, 2017	Toyota Center	Houston, Texas	Raw; SmackDown	5 on 5	Team Raw (Alicia Fox, Sasha Banks, Bayley, Asuka, and Nia Jax) defeated Team SmackDown (Becky Lynch, Naomi, Carmella, Natalya, and Tamina)	18:35	
80	2017	November 19, 2017	Toyota Center	Houston, Texas	Raw; SmackDown	5 on 5	Team Raw (Kurt Angle, Braun Strowman, Finn Bálor, Samoa Joe, and Triple H) defeated Team SmackDown (Shane McMahon, Randy Orton, Bobby Roode, Shinsuke Nakamura, and John Cena)	33:20	
81	2018	November 18, 2018	Staples Center	Los Angeles, California	Raw; SmackDown	10 on 10; Tag Team	Team SmackDown (The Usos (Jey Uso and Jimmy Uso), The New Day (Big E and Xavier Woods), Sanity (Eric Young and Killian Dain), Luke Gallows and Karl Anderson, and The Colóns (Epico Colón and Primo Colón) (with Kofi Kingston and Alexander Wolfe) defeated Team Raw (Bobby Roode and Chad Gable, The Revival (Dash Wilder and Scott Dawson), The B-Team (Bo Dallas and Curtis Axel), Lucha House Party (Lince Dorado and Kalisto/Gran Metalik), and The Ascension (Konnor and Viktor)	22:20	
82	2018	November 18, 2018	Staples Center	Los Angeles, California	Raw; SmackDown	5 on 5	Team Raw (Mickie James, Nia Jax, Tamina, Bayley, and Sasha Banks) (with Alexa Bliss) defeated Team SmackDown (Naomi, Carmella, Sonya Deville, Asuka, and Mandy Rose)	18:50	
83	2018	November 18, 2018	Staples Center	Los Angeles, California	Raw; SmackDown	5 on 5	Team Raw (Dolph Ziggler, Drew McIntyre, Braun Strowman, Finn Bálor, and Bobby Lashley) (with Baron Corbin and Lio Rush) defeated Team SmackDown (The Miz, Shane McMahon, Rey Mysterio, Samoa Joe, and Jeff Hardy)	24:00	
84	2019	November 24, 2019	Allstate Arena	Rosemont, Illinois	Raw; SmackDown; NXT	5 on 5 on 5	Team NXT (Rhea Ripley, Candice LeRae, Bianca Belair, Io Shirai, and Toni Storm) defeated Team Raw (Charlotte Flair, Natalya, Asuka, Kairi Sane, and Sarah Logan) and Team SmackDown (Sasha Banks, Carmella, Dana Brooke, Lacey Evans, and Nikki Cross)	27:49	
85	2019	November 24, 2019	Allstate Arena	Rosemont, Illinois	Raw; SmackDown; NXT	5 on 5 on 5	Team SmackDown (Roman Reigns, Mustafa Ali, Braun Strowman, King Corbin, and Shorty G) defeated Team Raw (Seth Rollins, Drew McIntyre, Kevin Owens, Randy Orton, and Ricochet) and Team NXT (Damian Priest, Matt Riddle, Keith Lee, Tommaso Ciampa, and Walter)	29:25	
86	2020	November 23, 2020	Amway Center	Orlando, Florida	Raw; SmackDown	5 on 5	Team Raw (Braun Strowman, Riddle, Sheamus, AJ Styles and Keith Lee) defeated Team SmackDown (Seth Rollins, Otis, Jey Uso, King Corbin and Kevin Owens)	19:25	
87	2020	November 23, 2020	Amway Center	Orlando, Florida	Raw; SmackDown	5 on 5	Team Raw (Lana, Nia Jax, Shayna Baszler, Peyton Royce and Lacey Evans) defeated Team SmackDown (Bayley, Natalya, Ruby Riott, Liv Morgan and Bianca Belair)	23:20	
88	2021	November 21, 2021	Barclays Center	Brooklyn, New York	Raw; SmackDown	5 on 5	Team Raw (Seth Rollins, Finn Bálor, Kevin Owens, Bobby Lashley, and Austin Theory) (with MVP) defeated Team SmackDown (Drew McIntyre, Jeff Hardy, King Woods, Happy Corbin, and Sheamus) (with Madcap Moss)	29:56	
89	2021	November 21, 2021	Barclays Center	Brooklyn, New York	Raw; SmackDown	5 on 5	Team Raw (Bianca Belair, Rhea Ripley, Liv Morgan, Carmella, and Queen Zelina) defeated Team SmackDown (Sasha Banks, Shayna Baszler, Shotzi, Natalya, and Toni Storm)	23:45	
90	2025	October 7, 2025	WWE Performance Center	Orlando, Florida	NXT; TNA	4 on 4	Team NXT (Jacy Jayne, Jaida Parker, Sol Ruca, and Lola Vice) defeated Team TNA (Kelani Jordan, Jessie McKay, Cassie Lee, and Mara Sadè)	23:11	
91	2025	October 7, 2025	WWE Performance Center	Orlando, Florida	NXT; TNA	4 on 4	Team TNA (Mike Santana, Frankie Kazarian, Moose, and Leon Slater) defeated Team NXT (Ricky Saints, Trick Williams, Je'Von Evans, and Myles Borne)	22:49	
92	2025	Taped: November 21, 2025; Aired: November 28, 2025	Ball Arena	Denver, Colorado	SmackDown	5 on 5	MFT (Solo Sikoa, JC Mateo, Talla Tonga, Tama Tonga, and Tonga Loa) defeated Team Sami (Sami Zayn, Rey Fénix, Shinsuke Nakamura, and the Motor City Machine Guns (Alex Shelley and Chris Sabin)) (Note: elimination order: JC Mateo, Shinsuke Nakamura, Tonga Loa, Alex Shelley, Chris Sabin, Rey Fenix, Tama Tonga, Talla Tonga, Sami Zayn, leaving Solo Sikoa as sole survivor.)	20:59	
93	2026	November 28, 2026	Daikin Park	Houston, Texas	Raw; SmackDown; Lucha Libre AAA Worldwide	5 on 5	Team USA (CM Punk, Cody Rhodes, Je'Von Evans, LA Knight and Trick Williams) vs. Team Mexico (Penta, Rey Fenix, Rey Mysterio, Dragon Lee and 1 TBA)		

== See also ==
- Hell in a Cell
- Royal Rumble match
- Elimination Chamber
- Money in the Bank ladder match
- Tables, ladders, and chairs match
