= Mantaur =

American professional wrestler (1968–2023)

Personal information
- Born: Mike Halac; May 14, 1968 Omaha, Nebraska, U.S.
- Died: July 11, 2023 (aged 55) Cape Coral, Florida, U.S.

Professional wrestling career
- Ring name(s): Bruiser Mastino; Goldust's Bodyguard; Mafiosi Mastino; Madd Mustafa; Mantaur; Tank; Terminator Mastino
- Billed height: 6 ft 0 in (183 cm)
- Billed weight: 401 lb (182 kg)
- Billed from: "The Island of Crete" (as Mantaur); South Africa (as Tank)
- Debut: 1991
- Retired: 2019

Mike Halac (May 14, 1968 – July 11, 2023) was an American professional wrestler. He was best known for his appearances with the World Wrestling Federation in the mid-1990s under the ring name Mantaur, and briefly as Tank.

== Professional wrestling career ==
=== Catch Wrestling Association (1991–1994) ===
In 1991, under the ring name Bruiser Mastino, Halac traveled to Germany to work for the Catch Wrestling Association. He debuted on November 11, losing a World Heavyweight Championship match to Rambo. He remained with the promotion until late 1994 when he returned to the United States to perform for the World Wrestling Federation.

=== World Wrestling Federation (1994–1995) ===
Halac wrestled his first two matches as Bruiser Mastino, defeating Nikolai Volkoff on August 25 and 26, 1994, at house shows. A few months later on the January 7, 1995, episode of Superstars of Wrestling (taped on December 10, 1994), Halac debuted in the World Wrestling Federation as Mantaur, defeating Walter Slow. The Mantaur character was that of a Minotaur who charged, trampled and mooed at opponents. Soon after debuting, he acquired Jim Cornette as his manager. Mantaur then began a small winning streak, defeating a series of jobbers. He got a shot at Intercontinental Champion Razor Ramon, and lost the match by disqualification due to interference by Jeff Jarrett, who was involved in a feud with Ramon at that time. Mantaur made his first PPV appearance at the 1995 Royal Rumble, where he competed in the Royal Rumble match and lasted nine minutes before being eliminated by Lex Luger.

Mantaur was defeated by Bret Hart during a taping of Wrestling Challenge in Moline, Illinois, on April 26, 1995. Mantaur entered the 1995 King of the Ring tournament but was pinned by Bob "Spark Plug" Holly in a qualifying match. In his final televised WWF match on June 6, 1995 (aired June 24), he lost to Bam Bam Bigelow as part of a push to enhance the popularity of Bigelow as a babyface. Halac made his last WWF appearance as a lumberjack in a lumberjack match between Sycho Sid and Diesel at In Your House 2.

=== Extreme Championship Wrestling; Catch Wrestling Association (1995–1996) ===
After leaving the WWF, Halac, as Bruiser Mastino, joined Extreme Championship Wrestling. He debuted there on December 1, 1995, with a victory over The Dark Ninja. Eight days later, he lost to Hack Meyers in December to Dismember. A few weeks after that, he lost to 911. At Holiday Hell, Mastino defeated El Puerto Ricano in his final match for the promotion, in which he was jeered with "Mantaur" chants from the always-vocal ECW audience.

Halac then briefly returned to the Catch Wrestling Association as "Terminator Mastino".

=== Return To World Wrestling Federation (1996) ===
In April 1996, Halac returned to the WWF playing the role of Goldust's unnamed bodyguard. He appeared with Goldust at In Your House 7 in his corner for his match against the Ultimate Warrior. After Goldust lost, Halac attacked Ultimate Warrior, but was overpowered and body slammed.

=== United States Wrestling Association; World Wrestling Federation (1997) ===
Halac then worked in the United States Wrestling Association as Tank, a masked member of The Truth Commission. He won the USWA Unified World Heavyweight Championship, his first and only wrestling title, on March 15, 1997, after defeating then-champion Jerry Lawler. He lost the belt back to Lawler in a rematch seven days later. Later that spring, Tank was involved in a controversy surrounding the World Tag Team Championship. While The Interrogator and Recon (Tank's teammates in The Truth Commission) held the title, Tank substituted for The Interrogator in one match and his team lost the title to Nick Dinsmore and Flash Flanagan. The title change was declared invalid, however, as Tank was not one of the official holders of the World Tag Team Title.

He returned to the WWF in June 1997 with the Truth Commission as he fought as Tank. He was on two Shotgun Saturday Night episodes for 6 tag matches until his release later that summer.

=== Catch Wrestling Association; Independent Circuit (1998–2001, 2005–2019) ===
Halac returned to the CWA in September 1998, again as Bruiser Mastino. He wrestled three matches for NWA Germany later that year, winning the first against Franz Schumann on September 22, losing the second to Ulf Herman on September 23, and losing the third to Shumann on December 2. He also competed in the European Wrestling Promotion (EWP), defeating Christian Eckstein on November 25. Halac returned to the EWP on May 18, 2001, winning a triple threat match against Eric Schwarz and Martin Nolte. The next day, he defeated Big Tiger Steele and retired from wrestling.

Halac returned to wrestling on June 3, 2005, in Germany for one night only for Riotgas Wrestling Alliance. He won a battle royal and later that night fought his cousin Cannonball Grizzly for the RWA International title which Grizzly won.

In June 2009, Halac along with his cousin P. N. News promoted an independent tour entitled "Beach Brawl 09" with two shows at Fun Plex in Omaha, Nebraska and concluding in Hartington, Nebraska. The tour included Alex Shelley, Homicide, Matt Morgan, Lenny Lane and Chad Collyer. On the first show of the tour, Halac (as Brusier Mastino) teamed with News (as Cannonball Grizzly) as Big O Incorporated in a winning effort against Matt Morgan & Homicide. He lost to Tito Santana at Pro Wrestling Syndicate in Metuchen, New Jersey on December 7, 2012. In May 2015, as "The Turkish Terror" Madd Mustafa, he won the American Heritage Wrestling Heavyweight Championship at their inaugural event in Adel, Iowa. In September 2016, Halac returned to Germany for European Wrestling Promotion where he teamed with Thunder against P. N. News and Christian Eckstein in a no contest. On November 28, 2018, Mantaur was an inaugural inductee into the Omaha Pro Wrestling Hall Of Fame at the PWP Live "Wrestlerama" event at The Waiting Room Lounge in Omaha.

Halac's last match was on April 7, 2019, he wrestled as Mantaur at GCW's Joey Janela's Spring Break 3 Part 2 in a Clusterfuck Battle Royal in Jersey City, New Jersey. He was eliminated by Cecil Nyx.

== Personal life ==
Halac was the younger cousin of American professional wrestler P. N. News.

In July 2016, Halac was named part of a class action lawsuit filed against WWE which alleged that wrestlers incurred traumatic brain injuries during their tenure and that the company concealed the risks of injury. The suit was litigated by attorney Konstantine Kyros, who has been involved in a number of other lawsuits against WWE. The case was dismissed by US District Judge Vanessa Lynne Bryant in September 2018.

=== Illness and death ===
Halac had type 2 diabetes. He died in his sleep on July 11, 2023, at the age of 55. Earlier that day he had fallen and injured his back. His daughter announced his death on social media.

== Championships and accomplishments ==
- Catch Wrestling Association
  - Catch Cup Champion 1992
- Pro Wrestling Illustrated
  - PWI ranked him #235 of the top 500 singles wrestlers in the PWI 500 in 1995
- United States Wrestling Association
  - USWA Unified World Heavyweight Championship (1 time)
