= The Oddities (professional wrestling) =

Professional wrestling stable

Oddities

Stable
- Members: The Jackyl; Kurrgan; Giant Silva; Golga; Violent J Shaggy 2 Dope; Luna Vachon; Sable; George Steele
- Name(s): The Parade of Human Oddities; The Oddities
- Debut: May 25, 1998
- Disbanded: February 28, 1999
- Years active: 1998–1999

The Oddities (also known as The Parade of Human Oddities) were a professional wrestling stable in the World Wrestling Federation (WWF) during the Attitude Era of the late 1990s.

== History ==
=== World Wrestling Federation (1998–1999) ===
The Jackyl formed the group in May 1998 and called them "The Parade of Human Oddities” after The Truth Commission disbanded. The group consisted of a freak show of wrestlers, including the masked Golga (whose mask made it look like bony overgrowths deformed his cranium), the deranged Luna Vachon, the towering Kurrgan (who stood at seven feet tall) and the even larger Giant Silva. On the May 25, 1998 episode of Monday Night Raw, the stable appeared in a segment with Howard Stern Show regulars Hank the Angry Drunken Dwarf and Crackhead Bob. Under the leadership of the Jackyl, the Oddities were a fearsome group of heels though they did not win any titles. Jackyl, however, soon left the Oddities to become the manager of Hell's Henchmen (later renamed The Acolytes), before leaving WWE altogether.

On the August 3, 1998 episode of Raw, the Oddities were re-introduced, this time as babyfaces, by Sable, a former enemy of Vachon who had discovered their fun loving side and made them feel happy in spite of their freakish appearances. The same night, Golga (now turned into a fan of Eric Cartman) defeated Marc Mero, with whom Sable was feuding, and the group celebrated in the ring afterwards. Off-screen, the idea to pair Sable with the Oddities had been Vince McMahon's. The Oddities made their pay-per-view debut at SummerSlam under a new entrance music performed live by Insane Clown Posse, who also started accompanying them to the ring and dancing energetically along with all of them before their matches. Their entrance video featured clips from the 1932 horror film Freaks, as the song and video celebrated the film's message, that the "freaks" were actually decent and polite and that the so-called "normal" people were bad. At the event, Kurrgan, Golga and Giant Silva defeated the numerically superior Kaientai (Taka Michinoku, Dick Togo, Mens Teioh and Sho Funaki) thanks to their enormous individual sizes.

They later started a feud with The Headbangers (Mosh and Thrasher), who feigned friendship to attack the group on Raw in September 21, 1998. The Oddities scored victories against them in Raw and Sunday Night Heat thanks to interventions by Insane Clown Posse, which caused The Headbangers to start targeting them specifically. They challenged ICP to a tag team match on October 5 on Raw, during which Insane Clown Posse were beaten down. At Judgment Day: In Your House's Heat tapings on October 18, the Oddities defeated Los Boricuas (Jose Estrada, Miguel Pérez Jr. and Jesús Castillo), but The Headbangers intervened and attacked ICP after the bout. This and similar incidents frustrated the duo, who started blaming the Oddities for their beatdowns. Violent J and Shaggy worked to become active wrestlers in the group, but they also demonstrated too much aggression, causing the disqualification of the group in a rematch against Kai En Tai on October 20 on Raw when they attacked the referee. Finally, on the November 23 episode of Monday Night Raw, the Insane Clown Posse turned on the Oddities and joined The Headbangers to assault and humiliate their former stable with Mace. The following week, the remaining Oddities returned the attack and challenged Mosh and Thrasher to a match in Rock Bottom: In Your House, but they were defeated. The group then enlisted the aid of George "The Animal" Steele, who was introduced in a giant gift box to attack the Headbangers by surprise. He was referred by the announcers as the "original Oddity" . The same month, however, Vachon became a villainess aligning herself with Shane McMahon and abandoned the group to feud over the WWF Women's Championship with Sable.

In 1999, the Oddities began another feud, this time against a coalition between Too Much (Brian Christopher and Scott Taylor) and The Disciples of Apocalypse (8-Ball and Skull), but it was short and unsuccessful. At the Royal Rumble in 1999, Golga made a short appearance before being eliminated by Steve Austin. Kurrgan also appeared and lasted longer than Golga before being eliminated by Kane.

After the February 28, 1999 edition of Sunday Night Heat, all 4 members of the Oddities were released by the WWF. They were written off of TV where The Undertaker defeated Kurrgan in a quick squash match, with the Ministry of Darkness beating down all of the other members of The Oddities after the match.

Golga died on June 7, 2006, from bladder cancer after a two-year battle.

=== Independent circuit (2007–2009) ===
In August 2007, Giant Silva led an unofficial incarnation of the stable named Odd-It-Tees in National Wrestling Superstars, teaming up with a Golga impersonator named Goal-Duh and being managed by George Steele. They were later joined by The Zombie. The team was short-lived and competed for the last time in 2009.

== Championships and accomplishments ==
- Wrestling Observer Newsletter awards
  - Worst Gimmick (1998)
  - Worst Tag Team (1998)

== In other media ==
In 1999, Jakks Pacific released a Kurrgan action figure representing his Oddities-era persona as part of the WWF Summer Slam 99: Deadly Games line.

Kurrgan appears as a playable character in the 1999 professional wrestling video game WWF Attitude. His selectable attires include his Oddities outfits as well as his earlier Truth Commission uniform.
