= Monster Brawl =

- Promotional film poster
- Directed by: Jesse Thomas Cook
- Written by: Jesse Thomas Cook
- Produced by: Jesse Thomas Cook; John Geddes; Matt Wiele
- Starring: Dave Foley; Art Hindle; Robert Maillet; Kevin Nash; Jimmy Hart; Herb Dean
- Narrated by: Lance Henriksen
- Cinematography: Brendan Uegama
- Music by: Todor Kobakov
- Production company: Foresight Features
- Distributed by: Anchor Bay Entertainment
- Release date: 23 July 2011 (Fantasia Fest)
- Running time: 90 minutes
- Country: Canada
- Language: English
- Budget: $200,000 (Canadian)

Monster Brawl is a 2011 independent Canadian horror comedy film directed by Jesse Thomas Cook.

== Plot ==
The film depicts a wrestling-style fight to the death set inside an abandoned and cursed graveyard, shown in a pay-per-view style atmosphere. The fighters are eight classic movie monsters – Cyclops, Swamp Gut, Frankenstein's Monster, Lady Vampire, Werewolf, Mummy, Witch Bitch and Zombie Man. Acting as play-by‐play announcer is Buzz Chambers (Dave Foley) with color commentating by former champ Sasquatch Sid (Art Hindle). The Brawl itself is divided into two classes: The Creature class and the Undead class. For the Creatures: Cyclops, Werewolf, Witch Bitch and Swamp Gut. For the Undead: Lady Vampire, Zombie Man, The Mummy and Frankenstein. Each round is preceded by the origin of the combatants. For the first round, Cyclops, revealed to have received a message of the tournament goes to prove himself to the world and eventually to crush Hades who had cursed him with his foreseeing eye, while Witch Bitch is recruited by a diminutive troll named Grub who is a renowned monster combat trainer to overcome her small village's hatred of her through fear and dominance. As their combat starts off, Cyclops clearly has the advantage, but Witch Bitch is tenacious and fights viciously. As the combat ensues, she attempts to slam and pin the Cyclops down, her efforts leading to an illegal move called by the referee. Cyclops counters her attacks by bringing out a small mallet to brutally bludgeon her. Her retaliation is by whipping out a carving knife and attacking, inadvertently slashing the ref's throat in the process. She tries to blind Cyclops, but he turns his legendary optic beam on her, melting her face clean off and killing her. Outraged by the loss, Grub attempts to attack the Cyclops, only to be decapitated in a single punch. Cyclops stands as winner for round one.

Round two faces off the mummy, who was the subject of a national search when he escaped from his crate at a museum and killed the loading dock worker there, while Lady Vampire is hunted in her mysterious home by a man who tries to gun her down, only to be bitten and chased off in fear. Mummy has the advantage of no blood or feeling to the vampire's throws and attacks. He out-muscles most of her attacks and keeps on coming, he blinds her and knocks her out with a sleeper hold. But when he goes to get a wooden stake and bring it back, she revives and continues to wail on him. He has a brief advantage with his magical amulet that harnesses the power of the sun, burning half of Lady Vampire's face. But she throws him from the ring, separating him from his amulet, after hitting him with a tombstone, she punches him through his chest, ripping out his black heart and killing him. She is declared the winner of the Undead lightweight round. The third round, featuring the heavyweight combatants Werewolf and Swamp Gut, they are preceded by the Werewolf's story, having witnessed his wife's death at the hands of a werewolf, he goes out in search to kill him. However, the werewolf attacks and bites him, cursing him even though he manages to finish the wolf off. He is smarmy and sarcastic and viciously self-confident with the advantage of the full moon showing that night. Swamp Gut's story is portrayed as a documentary where, like a crocodile he hunts unassuming victims in his swamps, paralyzing them with his toxic spit and devouring them. As the match starts, Werewolf proves little effectiveness in his body slams due to Swamp Gut's girth, but his agility keeps him one step ahead as he attacks the gut's weak spot, his stomach. Sid makes reference to King Hippo of Punch Out in comparison to the battle. Werewolf's blows weaken his opponent who collapses to the ring. He does a dive from the corner onto Swamp Gut, causing his stomach to explode, killing him. Werewolf is the king of the creature heavyweight championship and moves on to the final match. The second match is between Frankenstein and Zombie Man, Frankenstein's life beginning after a German doctor's attempts to reanimate the dead are successful, he calls his creator 'father' and has an emotional attachment to him immediately, while Zombie Man, a kidnapped government experiment at the ultimate soldier is trained specifically for this tournament. Colonel Crookshank sacrifices men to feed the zombie's appetite for human flesh and earn trust. As the pair match off, Zombie Man is much faster than Frankenstein, but his bites are ineffective. The pair match blow for blow, but much to his father's disdain, Frankenstein does not realize he needs to destroy Zombie Man's head. As the doctor climbs into the ring and attacks Zombie Man with a wrench, Crookshank does the same and kills the doctor with a hatchet to the back. This enrages Frankenstein who brutally attacks Zombie Man, eventually crushing his skull with his foot. In his death throes, Zombie Man summons up a horde of six zombies, one of which bites Sid in the booth before they combine their efforts and attack Crookshank before the caretaker kills them all. The final match is between Werewolf and Frankenstein, Sid slowly loses his composure and becomes a zombie during the round, forcing Buzz to kill him. Meanwhile, Werewolf is at a severe disadvantage with the towering undead. His blows don't phase Frankenstein, who, despite having his leg practically torn off in a figure four hold from the Werewolf manages to beat him into submission by crushing his skull with his hands. Frankenstein starts to walk away the victor but Werewolf recovers, attacking him more viciously, taking several tombstones and crushing them over Frankenstein's head. He takes the belt for himself, but Frankenstein wakes and attacks the unaware werewolf, grabbing his jowls before ripping his head apart. Finally victorious, Frankenstein takes his hard-earned belt and starts to leave. But Crookshank, now a sentient zombie challenges him to a fight. Both men standing at even height and muscle they start to wield a mighty blow at one another when the screen freezes and goes dark.

In a post-credit scene, Jimmy Hart is speaking on the phone while a zombie walks behind him grabs and pull him under the ring.

== Cast ==
- Dave Foley as Buzz Chambers
- Art Hindle as "Sasquatch" Sid Tucker
- Robert Maillet as Frankenstein
- Kevin Nash as Colonel Crookshank
- Lance Henriksen as the Narrator
- Jimmy Hart as Himself
- Herb Dean as Himself
- Jason David Brown as Cyclops / Swamp Gut / Cyril Haggard
- Kelly Couture as Lady Vampire
- R.J. Skinner as Werewolf / Mummy (King Khafra)
- Rico Montana as Zombie Man
- Holly Letkeman as Witch Bitch
- John Geddes as Lieutenant Briggs
- Mark Gibson as Agent Dunn
- Christopher Goddard as Sheriff
- Jason Deline as Jacob Blackburn
- Jesse T. Cook as the Village Drunk
- Ashley Byford as Blonde Ring Girl
- Rachelle Corbeil as Black-haired Ring Girl
- Ari Millen as Dr. Igora
- Chris Rutte as The Grub
- Matt Wiele as The Messenger
- Janet Dee as Bucket Fanny

== Production ==
The film was shot in Collingwood, Ontario.

== Release ==
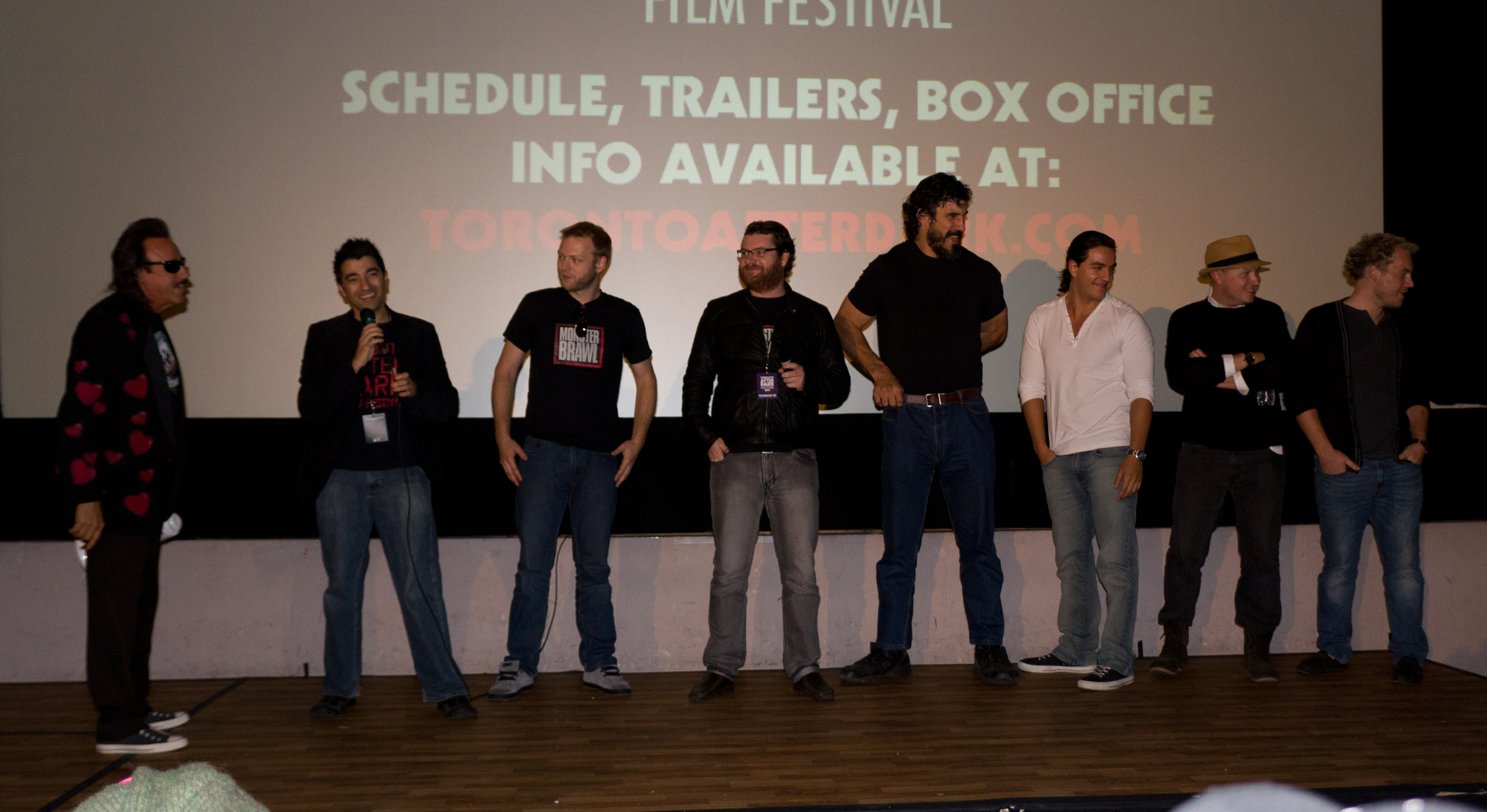
Cast and crew of the film Monster Brawl at the gala opening of the 2011 festival.

The film was premiered at the 2011 Fantasia Film Festival and was chosen as the Opening Gala Film at the 2011 Toronto After Dark Film Festival.
