= The Truth Commission =

Professional wrestling stable

Stable
- Members: Kurrgan the Interrogator; Recon; Sniper; Tank
- Manager(s): The Commandant; The Jackyl
- Billed from: South Africa
- Debut: 1997
- Disbanded: 1999
- Years active: 1997–1999

The Truth Commission was a professional wrestling stable in the World Wrestling Federation (WWF) and the United States Wrestling Association (USWA). Their gimmick was that they were a white separatist group from South Africa, and their label "Truth Commission" was a take on the South African Truth and Reconciliation Commission.

== History ==
The Truth Commission debuted in the USWA in 1997, where Recon and Kurrgan (then known as The Interrogator) captured the USWA Tag Team Championship and Tank briefly captured the USWA Unified World Heavyweight Championship. Their manager, the Commandant, was an actor who had met Bret Hart while Hart was filming in South Africa. Hart recommended him to the WWF as a manager for the Truth Commission. It was rumored in 1997 that Truth Commission would be the bodyguards and hired guns of The Hart Foundation. During a 1997 WWF tour of South Africa, The Commandant, stated during a promo that he was going to unleash his Commandos and Militia upon WWF by bringing glory to the South African nation.

Upon moving to the WWF, the Commandant was quickly replaced by Truth Commission member The Jackyl because the Commandant wasn't trained to wrestle or take bumps and Vince McMahon wanted a manager who could take bumps and wrestle. Incidentally, Jackyl was initially more interested in being a wrestler than the group's manager, but WWF booker Vince McMahon convinced him to cut promos on behalf of the Truth Commission because of his verbal talent. Tank departed from the WWF after two matches. The Interrogator name was changed to Kurrgan in November 1997 and he was pushed as a monster heel while Recon and Sniper competed as a tag team.

The stable started to fall apart when Jackyl expressed how disappointed he was with Recon and Sniper, who had little success in their matches. During this time, Jackyl would pay more attention to Kurrgan's career than Recon and Sniper. He would enter the ring when one or both of them lost a match, berated and slapped them, then ordered the towering Kurrgan to attack them. Eventually, Recon and Sniper formed the team of Armageddon (under their real names of Buchanan and Poirier), but left the WWF after several matches. They continued to work together as Recon and Sniper in other promotions until disbanding in 1999.

Kurrgan remained a part of The Jackyl's new stable, The Oddities. Jackyl would later manage The Acolytes and left WWF in December 1998 and went to Extreme Championship Wrestling as Cyrus the Virus. Kurrgan would stay with the Oddities until they disbanded on 28 February 1999, and he was released in March 1999. Sniper would return to Germany for Catch Wrestling Association and then retired from wrestling in 1999. In 2000 Recon would later return to the WWF as Bull Buchanan, first as a tag team partner of the Big Bossman, then later as a member of Right to Censor. He later teamed up with John Cena until his release from the company in 2003. He would make a final appearance in March 2011 as part of a "This is Your Life, John Cena" segment featuring Mick Foley, in which he began by remembering his time as Cena's tag team partner at first fondly, but on an increasingly-sour note until concluding by accusing Cena of ruining his life.

Tank died on 11 July 2023 from a fall and complications from diabetes at 55.

== In other media ==
In 1998, Jakks Pacific released action figures depicting members of the Truth Commission as part of its WWF 2 Tuff line. Series 1 featured the Interrogator (Kurrgan) and Recon in a two-pack. A subsequent Series 2 two-pack featured Kurrgan alongside the group's later leader, The Jackyl.

The Truth Commission is referenced in the 1999 professional wrestling video game WWF Attitude. Kurrgan appears as a playable character, with his Truth Commission uniform available as one of his alternate attires.

== Championships and accomplishments ==
- United States Wrestling Association
  - USWA Tag Team Championship (3 times) - Recon and Kurrgan
  - USWA Unified World Heavyweight Championship (1 time) - Tank
