= USWA Unified World Heavyweight Championship =

Professional wrestling championship

Details
- Promotion: United States Wrestling Association
- Date established: December 13, 1988
- Date retired: November 1997
Statistics
- First champion: Jerry Lawler
- Most reigns: Jerry Lawler (28 times)
- Longest reign: Sid Vicious (205 days)
- Shortest reign: Sid Vicious (3 days)

The USWA Unified World Heavyweight Championship was a professional wrestling world heavyweight championship formed in 1988, which consisted of the WCWA World Heavyweight Championship from World Class Championship Wrestling and the AWA World Heavyweight Championship from the American Wrestling Association. The title was unified on December 13, 1988, when AWA World Champion Jerry Lawler defeated WCWA World Champion Kerry Von Erich in a unification match.

The title was primarily recognized by and defended in the United States Wrestling Association until 1997, when the company ceased operations. However, the AWA withdrew its recognition of the championship shortly after the unification match when Lawler was stripped of the AWA world title. The title was also contested in a non-televised match prior to the World Wrestling Federation's King of the Ring event in 1993.

== Title history ==
Key
No.	Overall reign number
Reign	Reign number for the specific champion
Days	Number of days held

No.	Champion	Championship change			Reign statistics		Notes	Ref.
No.	Champion	Date	Event	Location	Reign	Days	Notes	Ref.
1	Jerry Lawler	December 13, 1988	SuperClash III	Chicago, Illinois	1	109	Lawler, the reigning AWA World Heavyweight Champion, defeated Kerry Von Erich to win the WCWA World Heavyweight Championship. This results in the USWA Unified World Heavyweight Championship being formed. In January 1989, he was stripped of the AWA title by the AWA, ending the AWA title's connection with the USWA Unified World Heavyweight title. Lawler continues to be recognized as the USWA Unified World Heavyweight Champion by the USWA. On January 10, 1989, Dutch Mantell appeared to defeat Lawler to win the title after guest referee Ricky Morton (who had been paid off by Mantell) helped Mantell win by knocking Lawler's feet off the ropes in Mantell's pinfall attempt. The CWA Championship Committee reversed the decision the following week, returning the title to Lawler	
2	Master of Pain	April 1, 1989	USWA show	Memphis, Tennessee	1	24	The WCWA World Heavyweight Championship was held up in April 1989. Regardless, the USWA continues to recognize the USWA Unified World Heavyweight Championship. At this point, the USWA Unified World Heavyweight Championship was not unified with either the AWA or World Class World Heavyweight Championships; consequently, the influential Pro Wrestling Illustrated outright refused to recognise the Unified championship as a separate title in its own right.	
3	Jerry Lawler	April 25, 1989	USWA show	Memphis, Tennessee	2	181	On April 14 Lawler defeats Kerry Von Erich to win the WCWA World Heavyweight Championship again. Lawler claims to still be champion in AWA and wins the USWA Unified World Heavyweight title on April 25	
4	The Soultaker	October 23, 1989	USWA show	Memphis, Tennessee	1	14	This title change was not recognised in the Texas/World Class branch of the USWA	
5	Jerry Lawler	November 6, 1989	USWA show	Memphis, Tennessee	3	54		
6	King Cobra	December 30, 1989	USWA show	Memphis, Tennessee	1	9	This title change was not recognised in the Texas/World Class branch of the USWA	
7	Jerry Lawler	January 8, 1990	USWA show	Memphis, Tennessee	4	49		
8	Jimmy Valiant	February 26, 1990	USWA show	Memphis, Tennessee	1	14	This title change was not recognised in the Texas/World Class branch of the USWA	
9	Jerry Lawler	March 12, 1990	USWA show	Memphis, Tennessee	5	47		
10	Jimmy Valiant	April 28, 1990	USWA show	Memphis, Tennessee	2	7	This title change was not recognised in the Texas/World Class branch of the USWA	
11	Jerry Lawler	May 5, 1990	USWA show	Memphis, Tennessee	6	44		
12	Snowman	June 18, 1990	USWA show	Memphis, Tennessee	1	70		
—	Vacated	August 27, 1990	—	—	—	—	Snowman no-shows title defense. (World Class Championship Wrestling ends business relationship with USWA in September 1990, ending the WCWA title's connection with the USWA Unified World Heavyweight title. Regardless, the USWA continues to recognize the USWA Unified World Heavyweight Championship)	
13	Jerry Lawler	October 8, 1990	USWA show	Memphis, Tennessee	7	28	Defeated Austin Idol in tournament final	
14	Terry Funk	November 5, 1990	USWA show	Memphis, Tennessee	1	126		
15	Jerry Lawler	March 11, 1991	USWA show	Memphis, Tennessee	8	140		
16	Awesome Kong	July 29, 1991	USWA show	Memphis, Tennessee	1	14		
17	Jerry Lawler	August 12, 1991	USWA show	Memphis, Tennessee	9	14		
18	The Dragon Master	August 26, 1991	USWA show	Memphis, Tennessee	1	7		
19	Jerry Lawler	September 2, 1991	USWA show	Memphis, Tennessee	10	84		
20	Kamala	November 25, 1991	USWA show	Memphis, Tennessee	1	7		
21	Jerry Lawler	December 2, 1991	USWA show	Memphis, Tennessee	11	5		
—	Vacated	December 7, 1991	—	—	—	—	Championship vacated after a match against Kamala	
22	Kamala	December 9, 1991	USWA show	Memphis, Tennessee	2	55	Won rematch	
—	Vacated	February 2, 1992	—	—	—	—	Championship vacated after match against Koko B Ware	
23	Kamala	February 10, 1992	USWA show	Memphis, Tennessee	3	14	Won rematch	
24	Koko B. Ware	February 24, 1992	USWA show	Memphis, Tennessee	1	21		
25	Kamala	March 16, 1992	USWA show	Memphis, Tennessee	4	49		
26	Jerry Lawler	May 4, 1992	USWA show	Memphis, Tennessee	12	42	Defeated Eddie Gilbert on June 8, 1992 to win the GWF World Heavyweight Championship, supposedly unifying the two championships although Gilbert had been stripped of the championship previously	
27	Eddie Gilbert	June 15, 1992	USWA show	Memphis, Tennessee	1	28		
28	Ricky Morton	July 13, 1992	USWA show	Memphis, Tennessee	1	7		
29	Eddie Gilbert	July 20, 1992	USWA show	Memphis, Tennessee	2	63		
30	Junkyard Dog	September 21, 1992	USWA show	Memphis, Tennessee	1	21		
31	Butch Reed	October 12, 1992	USWA show	Memphis, Tennessee	1	5		
32	Todd Champion	October 17, 1992	"USWA show"	Cleveland, Ohio	1	16	Announced as having won a match, storyline to cover for Butch Reed leaving USWA	
33	Jerry Lawler	November 2, 1992	USWA show	Memphis, Tennessee	13	35		
34	Koko B. Ware	December 7, 1992	USWA show	Memphis, Tennessee	2	7		
35	Jerry Lawler	December 14, 1992	USWA show	Memphis, Tennessee	14	140		
36	Papa Shango	May 3, 1993	USWA show	Memphis, Tennessee	2	49	Previously held the championship under the ring name "The Soultaker"	
37	Owen Hart	June 21, 1993	USWA show	Memphis, Tennessee	1	14		
38	Jerry Lawler	July 5, 1993	USWA show	Memphis, Tennessee	15	70		
39	Tatanka	September 13, 1993	USWA show	Memphis, Tennessee	1	7	Tatanka worked for the WWF at the time, and was undefeated.	
40	Jerry Lawler	September 20, 1993	USWA show	Memphis, Tennessee	16	21	Lawler pinned Tatanka in a six-man tag team elimination match and the title changed hands due to a pre-match stipulation.	
41	Randy Savage	October 11, 1993	USWA show	Memphis, Tennessee	1	40		
—	Vacated	November 20, 1993	—	—	—	—	The USWA and the World Wrestling Federation (WWF) temporarily end co-promotion	
42	Jeff Jarrett	November 22, 1993	USWA show	Memphis, Tennessee	1	28	Won a battle royal	
43	Jerry Lawler	December 20, 1993	USWA show	Memphis, Tennessee	17	42		
44	Eddie Gilbert	January 31, 1994	USWA show	Memphis, Tennessee	3	7		
45	Jerry Lawler	February 7, 1994	USWA show	Memphis, Tennessee	18	7		
46	Eddie Gilbert	February 14, 1994	USWA show	Memphis, Tennessee	4	39		
47	Jerry Lawler	March 25, 1994	USWA show	Senatobia, Mississippi	19	113		
48	Sid Vicious	July 16, 1994	USWA show	Memphis, Tennessee	1	205	Won by forfeit	
49	Jerry Lawler	February 6, 1995	USWA show	Memphis, Tennessee	20	19		
50	Bill Dundee	February 25, 1995	USWA show	Memphis, Tennessee	1	37		
51	Razor Ramon	April 3, 1995	USWA show	Memphis, Tennessee	1	28		
52	Jerry Lawler	May 1, 1995	USWA show	Memphis, Tennessee	21	189		
53	Ahmed Johnson	November 6, 1995	USWA show	Memphis, Tennessee	1	44		
54	Jeff Jarrett	December 20, 1995	USWA show	Tunica, Mississippi	2	73		
—	Vacated	March 2, 1996	—	—	—	—	Vacated after Jarrett suffered a back injury	
55	Jerry Lawler	March 4, 1996	USWA show	Memphis, Tennessee	22	4	Defeated Mabel in tournament final	
—	Vacated	March 8, 1996	—	—	—	—	Vacated after a match against Bill Dundee	
56	Jerry Lawler	April 5, 1996	USWA show	Memphis, Tennessee	23	15	Lawler won rematch	
57	Jeff Jarrett	April 20, 1996	USWA show	Memphis, Tennessee	3	95	Jarrett won with the help of referee Frank Morrell	
58	Jerry Lawler	July 24, 1996	USWA show	West Helena, Arkansas	24	37		
59	Sid Vicious	August 30, 1996	USWA show	Memphis, Tennessee	2	3		
60	Jerry Lawler	September 2, 1996	USWA show	Memphis, Tennessee	25	32		
61	The Colorado Kid	October 4, 1996	USWA show	Memphis, Tennessee	1	43		
62	Jerry Lawler	November 16, 1996	USWA show	Memphis, Tennessee	26	119		
63	Tank	March 15, 1997	USWA show	Memphis, Tennessee	1	7		
64	Jerry Lawler	March 22, 1997	USWA show	Memphis, Tennessee	27	21		
65	King Reginald	April 12, 1997	USWA show	Memphis, Tennessee	1	15		
66	Jerry Lawler	April 27, 1997	USWA show	Memphis, Tennessee	28	103		
67	Dutch Mantel	August 8, 1997	USWA show	Memphis, Tennessee	1	(Note: The exact date the USWA closed is not known, which means that the championship reign lasted between 85 and 114 days)		
—	Deactivated	November 2, 1997	—	—	—	—	USWA closed	

== Combined reigns ==
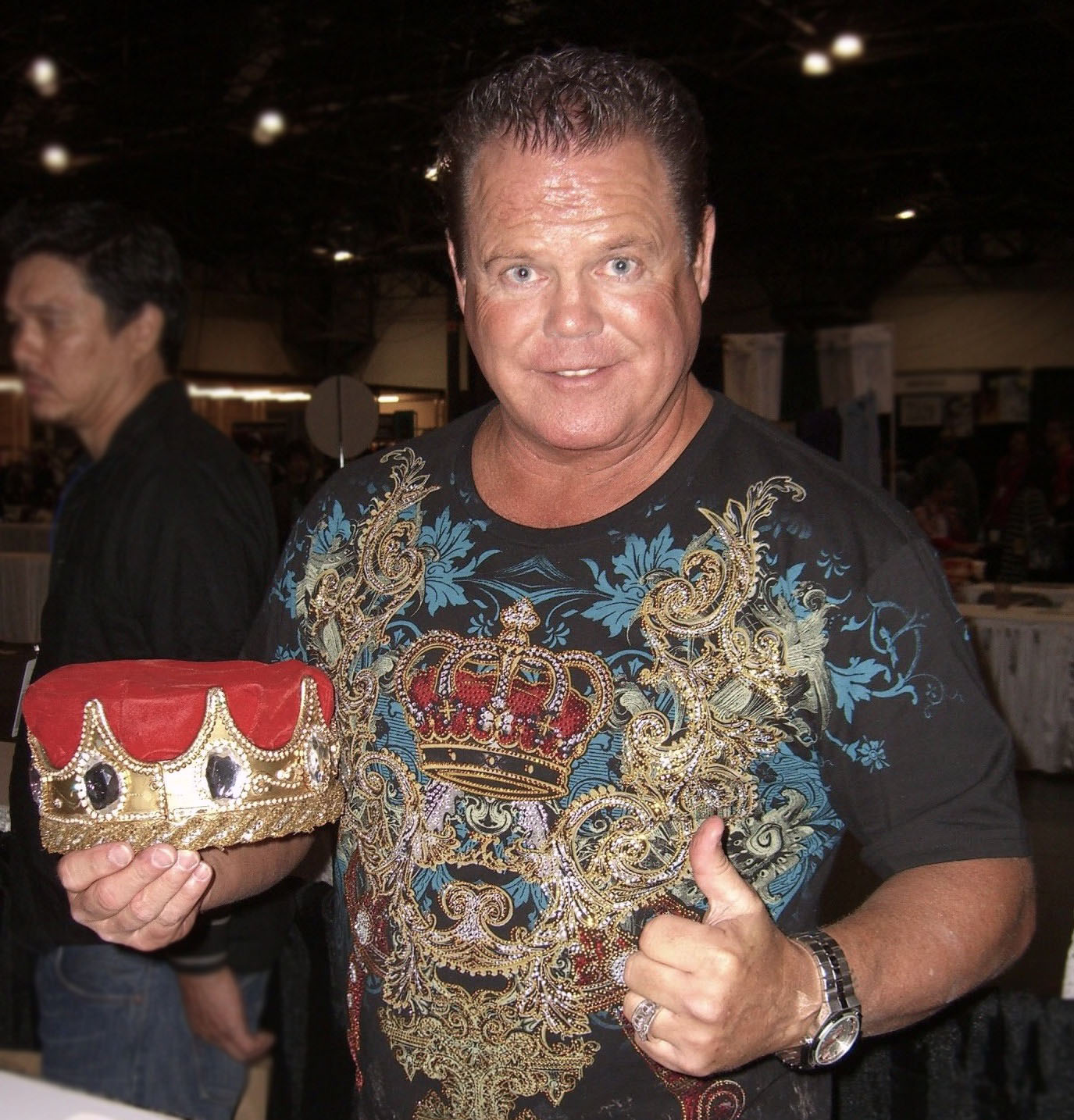
Inaugural and 28-time champion Jerry Lawler

Rank	Wrestler	No. of reigns	Combined days
1	Jerry Lawler	28	1764
2	Sid Vicious	2	208
3	Jeff Jarrett	3	196
4	Eddie Gilbert	4	137
5	Terry Funk	1	126
6	Kamala	4	125
7	Dutch Mantel	1	85-114
8	Snowman	1	70
9	The Soultaker/Papa Shango	2	63
10	Ahmed Johnson	1	44
11	The Colorado Kid	1	43
12	Randy Savage	1	40
13	Bill Dundee	1	37
14	Koko B. Ware	2	28
14	Razor Ramon	1	28
16	Master of Pain	1	24
17	Jimmy Valiant	2	21
17	Junkyard Dog	1	21
19	Todd Champion	1	16
20	King Reginald	1	15
21	Awesome Kong	1	14
21	Owen Hart	1	14
23	King Cobra	1	9
24	Ricky Morton	1	7
24	Tank	1	7
24	Tatanka	1	7
24	The Dragon Master	1	7
28	Butch Reed	1	5
