= Bull Buchanan =

American professional wrestler (born 1968)

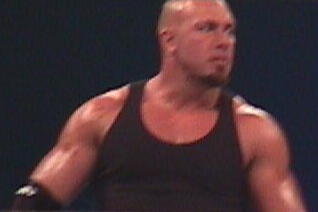
- Buchanan in 2000

Personal information
- Born: Barry Buchanan; January 15, 1968 (age 58) Bowdon, Georgia, U.S.
- Children: Brooks Jensen

Professional wrestling career
- Ring name(s): B-2; B²; Barry Bret; Buchanan; Bull Buchanan; Recon; Lord Humongous; Mr. Buchanan; The Punisher; Sam McGraw; Bo Buchanan; The Captain of Pro Wrestling
- Billed height: 6 ft 7 in (201 cm)
- Billed weight: 296 lb (134 kg)
- Billed from: South Africa (as Recon); Eddyville, Kentucky (as Bull Buchanan)
- Trained by: James Hammonds
- Debut: 1995

Barry Buchanan (born January 15, 1968) is an American professional wrestler. He is best known for his appearances with the World Wrestling Federation / Entertainment (WWF/WWE) under the ring names Recon, Bull Buchanan and B² and for his appearances with All Japan Pro Wrestling (AJPW) and Pro Wrestling Noah (NOAH) as Buchanan. Primarily a tag team wrestler, Buchanan is a former WWF World Tag Team Champion, All Asia Tag Team Champion, GHC Tag Team Champion and USWA World Tag Team Champion.

== Professional wrestling career ==
=== Early career (1995) ===
Buchanan was trained to wrestle by James Hammonds. He debuted in 1995, wrestling on the North Georgia independent circuit as "The Punisher". Buchanan formed a tag team with Ric Savage called "Body Count". The duo competed in National Championship Wrestling (NCW) until Buchanan was recruited by Jim Cornette for Smoky Mountain Wrestling.

=== Smoky Mountain Wrestling (1995) ===
Buchanan debuted in Smoky Mountain Wrestling (SMW) in 1995 as "The Punisher". He was a member of Jim Cornette's stable "The Militia" and acted as Cornette's bodyguard, feuding with Boo Bradley and The Bullet. Buchanan wrestled on the final SMW show in December 1995, teaming with Tommy Rich to wrestle Buddy Landel and The Bullet.

=== Extreme Championship Wrestling (1996) ===
Known as Stud, he teamed with Billy Black as The Dark Riders. The team made two appearances for ECW, with clips of a March 1996 match against ECW World Tag Team Champions, The Eliminators, airing on ECW's weekly television show.

=== United States Wrestling Association (1996–1997) ===
After SMW closed, Buchanan signed a WWF developmental contract and was assigned to the United States Wrestling Association (USWA), where he was known as Recon of the Truth Commission. With his partner The Interrogator, Buchanan won the USWA World Tag Team Championship on March 6, 1997, when they beat Billy Joe Travis and Flash Flanagan. The duo only held the titles for a week before losing them back to Flash Flanagan and Billy Joe Travis. The Truth Commission regained the titles on April 19 when they beat Billy Kidman and Ace Darling in Memphis, Tennessee. The second reign came to an end on May 14 when Steven Dunn and Paul Diamond defeated Recon and the Interrogator. Two weeks later, the Truth Commission became three times champions and held them until the titles were held up on June 14. The titles were vacated because Truth Commission member Tank teamed up with Recon and the titles could not be defended by a substitute. The Truth Commission left the USWA only a short time later as they were being called up to the World Wrestling Federation.

=== World Wrestling Federation / World Wrestling Entertainment (1997–2003) ===
==== The Truth Commission (1997–1998) ====
The entire Truth Commission faction (except Sniper) up until that point were brought in to the World Wrestling Federation. They made their WWF debut on the June 28, 1997, episode of Shotgun Saturday Night. The following week, Sniper made his debut and soon after Tank was removed from the team. The Truth Commission stable was short-lived; it disbanded in 1998, but Buchanan and Sniper of the Truth Commission stayed together as the short-lived tag team, Armageddon. After that team disappeared from TV, Buchanan remained under WWF contract, and was sent to their "developmental territory" Ohio Valley Wrestling to improve his skills. While there, Buchanan and partner Mr. Black captured the OVW Southern Tag Team Championship.

==== Right to Censor (2000–2001) ====
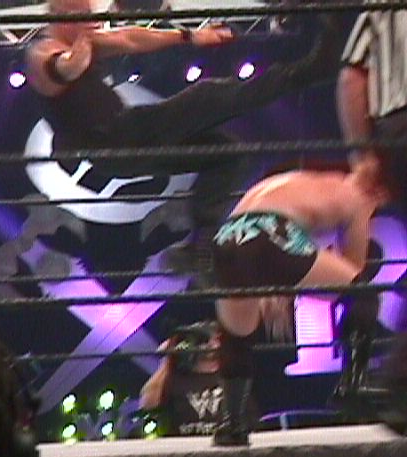
Buchanan (left) delivering a scissors kick to Crash Holly at King of the Ring in June 2000.

Buchanan returned to the WWF on the March 19, 2000, edition of Sunday Night Heat, now under the name "Bull Buchanan" and dressed in a SWAT uniform, helping the Big Boss Man attack Mideon. Buchanan and the Big Boss Man continued wearing matching SWAT-style uniforms and teaming together as Buchanan acted as some sort of a protégé to Boss Man. The team had a decent amount of success as they defeated The Godfather and D'Lo Brown at WrestleMania 2000, and beat the Acolytes the following month at Backlash. The team split on the June 5, 2000, edition of Raw Is War; after a loss to the Hardy Boyz, Buchanan and Boss Man began to argue which led to shoving and eventually Boss Man knocking out Buchanan with his nightstick when Buchanan's back was turned.

Buchanan briefly struck out on his own after that alliance ended, unsuccessfully participating in the King of the Ring tournament, before joining Steven Richards' ultra-conservative stable Right to Censor (RTC). On the July 24 episode of Raw, Buchanan faced the Godfather, in which he agreed to give up pimping if he lost. Buchanan defeated The Godfather, who promptly joined RTC and renounced his former ways. At SummerSlam on August 27, Right to Censor defeated Too Cool in a six-man tag team match. On the September 11 episode of Raw, Buchanan and the rechristened Goodfather defeated the Acolytes. After the match, Val Venis attacked the Acolytes, joining the group in the process. At Unforgiven, RTC defeated the Acolytes and the Dudley Boyz. At No Mercy on October 22, Buchanan and Goodfather entered into an elimination tag team tables match, which was won by the Dudley Boyz. The next night on Raw, Ivory was announced as the newest member of the group. Buchanan and Goodfather won the WWF Tag Team Championship from the Hardy Boyz on the November 6 episode of Raw. At Survivor Series, Buchanan and Goodfather teamed up with Edge & Christian, to face the Hardys and the Dudleys in a losing effort. At Rebellion, the duo retained the titles against the Hardys. They lost the titles to Edge and Christian at Armageddon in a fatal four-way tag team match also involving K-Kwik and Road Dogg and the Dudleys.

Buchanan entered the 2001 Royal Rumble match on January 21, 2001, at entry number 2, but was eliminated by the Hardys. At WrestleMania X-Seven, Buchanan, Goodfather and Venis were defeated by the APA (formerly the Acolytes) and Tazz. Also at WrestleMania, Ivory lost the WWF Women's Championship to Chyna. On the April 26 episode of SmackDown!, RTC lost to the Brothers of Destruction on a 4-on-2 handicap match, after all other members walked out on Richards mid-match. Buchanan would continue to team with Goodfather, until the June 17 episode of Sunday Night Heat, where they lost to the Dudley Boyz.

==== Teaming with John Cena and departure (2002–2003) ====
After Right to Censor was disbanded in mid-2001, Buchanan was once again sent to Ohio Valley Wrestling. In August 2002 he returned to the WWE after wrestling several matches with seemingly no character or purpose, until November 21 when John Cena was pinned by Rikishi. Buchanan came out and attacked Rikishi after the match thus aligning himself with Cena, who was beginning a rapper gimmick in which he would freestyle rhyme about his opponent as he made his entrance. Buchanan stood as an enforcer character for Cena and eventually finished Cena's Freestyles with his own quote: "Boo-yah!" Buchanan also began using the name B-2 (also written as B², pronounced "B-Squared"), and was also called Bling Bling Buchanan. This pairing did not last long. On the January 16, 2003, edition of SmackDown!, Cena and B-2 lost to Los Guerreros in a tag team title match which led to Cena blaming B-2 after the match for being pinned. This led to Cena slapping B-2 and B-2 shoving Cena down. As B-2 went to attack Cena, Redd Dogg debuted and came through the crowd and joined Cena in a beatdown on B-2; thus, Redd Dogg replaced B-2 at Cena's side. B-2's last televised match was on January 19 at the Royal Rumble in which he entered at number 11 and was eliminated in 24 seconds. B-2's last match was cut out of the January 23 edition of SmackDown! in which Redd Dogg defeated B-2. B-2 was released from WWE on January 26, 2003.

==== Sporadic appearances (2006, 2011) ====
Buchanan returned for one night on September 5, 2006, losing to Henry Godwinn in a dark match for SmackDown!.

On the November 14, 2011, episode of Raw, Buchanan made a one-night return to WWE in a segment where Mick Foley was bringing out people from John Cena's past, and Buchanan claimed that Cena ruined his life.

=== All Japan Pro Wrestling (2003–2007) ===
After parting ways with WWE, he signed with top Japanese promotion All Japan Pro Wrestling and performed as Buchanan. He debuted in early October and immediately aligned himself with Taka Michinoku, D'Lo Brown and The Gladiator and eventually joined Roughly Obsess and Destroy. On October 26, Buchanan and Brown took on Arashi and Keiji Muto for the World Tag Team Championship and lost. In the World's Strongest Tag Determination League 2003, Buchanan teamed with Gigantes where they gained six points, therefore not enough to progress further. On February 11, 2004, he teamed with Gladiator in his second Unified World Tag Team Championship and lost to the champions, Kaz Hayashi and Satoshi Kojima. Once again, Buchanan participated in the World's Strongest Tag Determination League for that year and teamed with D'lo Brown but would once again fall at the first hurdle. After teaming with various members of RO&D and having little success, he decided to bring in a new member which was Rico. This would prove to be the right choice as in their first match, on February 5, 2005, they defeated Masayuki Naruse and Mitsuya Nagai to become the All Asia Tag Team Champions. With that win, RO&D held all the championships in AJPW. Later in the month, there was an AJPW vs RO&D which RO&D won. Buchanan would participate in his first Champion Carnival 2005 where he gained five points. On May 27, 2005, Buchanan and Rico vacated the All Asia Tag Team Championship due to Rico retiring. In late 2005, RO&D became faces and feuded against the Voodoo Murders. During the transitional time, Buchanan and D'lo Brown lost to Katsuhiko Nakajima and Kensuke Sasaki in a match for the All Asia Tag Team Championship and later in the year took part in World's Strongest Tag Determination League 2005. Over the last part of 2005 and most of 2006, Buchanan would team with various members of RO&D and take part in tournaments and had very little success. With that in mind, on September 17, 2006, Buchanan and his regular tag team partner, D'lo Brown, betrayed RO&D and joined the rival Voodoo Murders faction. Buchanan and Brown continued to team with each other in Voodoo Murders and even took part in the World's Strongest Tag Determination League 2006 and once again lost. In early 2007, Buchanan and Brown left Voodoo Murders and AJPW to join Pro Wrestling Noah.

=== Pro Wrestling Noah (2007–2010) ===
On May 17, 2007, Buchanan along with D'lo Brown and Taka Michinoku debuted for Pro Wrestling Noah and would reform Roughly Obsess and Destroy. On July 8, Buchanan and Brown took on Jun Akiyama and Takeshi Rikio for the GHC Tag Team Championship and lost. After the tag titles were vacated, Buchanan and Brown took part in the GHC Tag Team Championship Decision Tournament where whoever gained the most points would win the tournament and the title. Buchanan and Brown gained six points, the most of any team, and therefore became the GHC Tag Team Champions. However, the celebrations would be cut short because only a week later, on October 10, they lost the titles to Naomichi Marufuji and Takashi Sugiura. They would enter to Global Tag League 2008 and 2009 but would come short. After being eliminated from the tournament, Buchanan would leave Noah but returned in February 2010 for one last tour.

=== Independent circuit (2003–2014, 2019–present) ===
On October 30, 2004, Buchanan and AJ Steele defeated David Young and Sonny Siaki to become the GCW Tag Team Champions but a week later, Steele would turn on him and teamed up with Damien Steel in a two on one handicapped match for the titles which the Steele Brothers won. Buchanan formed a stable called Bad Company which consisted of himself, David Young and The Grappler. In late 2004, Buchanan and The Grappler took on The Steele Brothers for the GCW Tag Team Championship and lost. On April 23, 2005, Buchanan and Young defeated Southside Trash (Big Daddy and Rowdy) for the GCW Tag Team Championship. on July 11, they lost the titles to John Bogie and Lee Thomas. Over a year later on December 13, 2006, Buchanan and Johnny Swinger defeated The Diamonds In The Rough (David Young and Elix Skipper) to become a three time GCW Tag Team Champion. They would hold the titles for 56 days before losing them to the NOW (Hale Collins and Vik Dalishus).

On September 29, 2007, Buchanan defeated former tag team partner, Johnny Swinger, to become the GCW Heavyweight Champion. In December, Buchanan would lose the title back to Swinger. He would challenge Swinger to several rematches but lost his first and won the second via DQ, therefore not winning the title back. In mid-2008, Buchanan would team up with another former partner, David Young, and Sonny Siaki. Although neither of them had a tag team title shot, the three of them earned a shot at Swingers' heavyweight title and in a four-way elimination match, Swinger came out on top. On June 27, 2008, Buchanan and Scotty Beach defeated Hot Like Lava (Cru Jones and Shaun Banks) for the GCW Tag Team Championship. They held the titles until September 18 when they lost them to Micah Taylor and Cru Jones. On January 28, 2010, Buchanan defeated Kyle Matthews to become a two time GCW Heavyweight Champion, however, he would lose it to Murder-1 on February 11. For the rest of 2010, Buchanan had multiple title shots but failed to capitalize on any of them.

Buchanan worked mainly for Universal Independent Wrestling in Georgia in his final years as a performer. He retired from professional wrestling on November 22, 2014, teaming with D'Lo Brown to face AJ Steele and Brad Lynch in his final match.

In March 2019, Buchanan returned to the ring teaming with his son Ben where they won a tag team match.

== Personal life ==
Buchanan has two sons named Benjamin and Zach. Benjamin, who is also a professional wrestler, currently performs for the WWE on NXT under the ring name Brooks Jensen. His other son, Zach, is currently an independent wrestler within the West Georgia area.

Buchanan has also started a wrestling promotion called "Bullpen Professional Wrestling", including independent wrestlers such as Zach Buchanan, AJ Black, Jaden Vain, JT Paradox, Sean Nelson, Dante Diamond and Trey Jordan. The promotion, started on June 8, 2024, is located in Bowdon, Georgia.

== In other media ==
Buchanan's Truth Commission persona Recon was released as an action figure by Jakks Pacific in 1998 as part of the WWF 2 Tuff Series 1 line. The figure was packaged as a two-pack with the Interrogator (Kurrgan).

== Championships and accomplishments ==
- All Japan Pro Wrestling
  - All Asia Tag Team Championship (1 time) – with Rico Constantino
- Georgia Championship Wrestling / Great Championship Wrestling
  - GCW Heavyweight Championship (2 times)
  - GCW Tag Team Championship (4 times) – with A.J. Steele (1), David Young (1), Johnny Swinger (1) and Scotty Beach (1)
- Global Championship Wrestling
  - GCW Heavyweight Championship (1 time)
- Music City Wrestling
  - MCW North American Heavyweight Championship (1 time)
- Ohio Valley Wrestling
  - OVW Southern Tag Team Championship (1 time) – with Mr. Black
- Pro Wrestling America
  - PWA Heavyweight Championship (2 times)
- Pro Wrestling Illustrated
  - Ranked No. 81 of the top 500 singles wrestlers in the PWI 500 in 2001
- Pro Wrestling Noah
  - GHC Tag Team Championship (1 time) – with D'Lo Brown
  - GHC Tag Team Title Decision Tournament (2007) – with D'Lo Brown
  - Global Tag League Technique Prize (2008, 2009) – with D'Lo Brown
- Anarchy Wrestling
  - Anarchy Tag Team Championship (1 times) – with Ben Buchanan
- Rampage Pro Wrestling
  - RPW Heavyweight Championship (2 times)
- Southern Extreme Championship Wrestling
  - SECW Heavyweight Championship (2 times)
- Southern Fried Championship Wrestling
  - SFCW Tag Team Championship (1 time) – with Ben Buchanan
- United States Wrestling Association
  - USWA World Tag Team Championship (3 times) – with The Interrogator
- Universal Independent Wrestling
  - UIW Heavyweight Championship (4 times)
- World Wrestling Federation
  - WWF World Tag Team Championship (1 time) – with The Godfather
