= The Godfather (wrestler) =

American professional wrestler (born 1961)

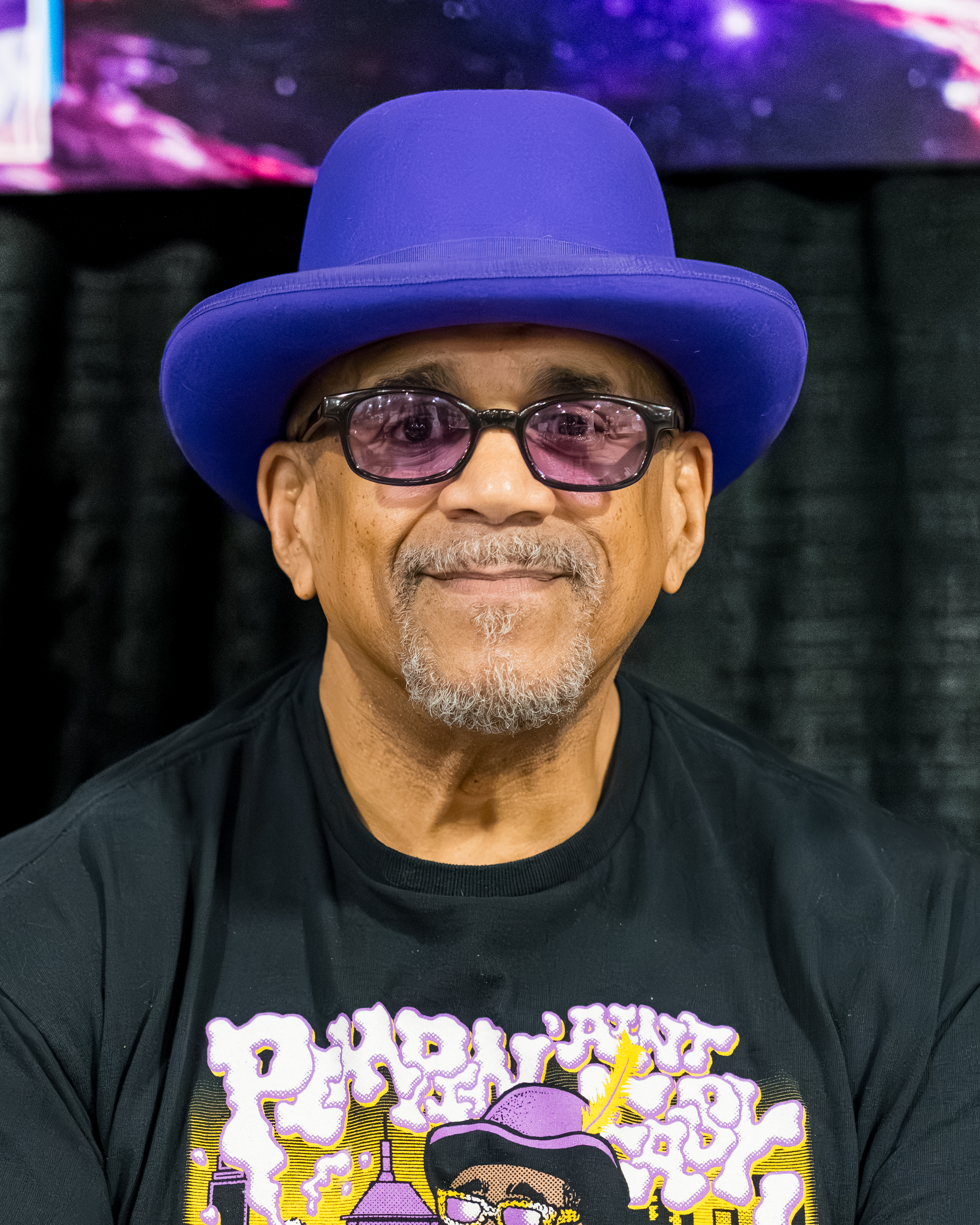
- Wright at GalaxyCon Nashville in 2026

Personal information
- Born: Charles Thomas Wright; May 16, 1961 (age 65) Las Vegas, Nevada, U.S.
- Education: University of Nevada, Reno
- Spouse: Denise Wright (m. 2000)
- Children: 4

Professional wrestling career
- Ring name(s): Baron Samedi; The Godfather; The Goodfather; Kama; Kama Mustafa; Smoke Train; Papa Shango; Pimp Fatha; Rocky Las Vegas; Sir Charles; The Soultaker
- Billed height: 6 ft 6 in (198 cm)
- Billed weight: 330 lb (150 kg)
- Billed from: "Parts Unknown" (as Papa Shango) Las Vegas, Nevada (as Kama/Kama Mustafa) "The Red Light District" (as The Godfather)
- Trained by: Larry Sharpe
- Debut: 1989
- Retired: 2002

Charles Wright (born May 16, 1961), better known under his ring name The Godfather, is an American professional wrestler. He is best known for his tenure with the World Wrestling Federation throughout the 1990s and early 2000s, and underwent several gimmick changes; the most notable were Papa Shango, Kama, Kama Mustafa, The Godfather, and The Goodfather.

Among other accolades, Wright is a two-time USWA Unified World Heavyweight Champion, a one-time WWF Intercontinental Champion, and a one-time WWF World Tag Team Champion (with Bull Buchanan). He headlined Saturday Night's Main Event XXXI against Bret Hart for the WWF Championship. Wright was inducted into the WWE Hall of Fame on April 2, 2016, under the Godfather gimmick.

== Professional wrestling career ==
=== Early career (1989–1991) ===
Wright first entered professional wrestling after being noticed tending to a bar by wrestlers during the filming of the movie Over the Top. The wrestlers involved gave him the advice that, with his large body type and unique (tattooed) look, he should try seeking out Larry Sharpe and his Monster Factory to get into the business. Eventually Wright parlayed his training into a job with Jerry Lawler in the United States Wrestling Association (USWA) with the gimmick the wrestlers from the bar had given him, that of a dark, menacing tattoeed brawler, and took the name "The Soultaker", taken from one of the tattoos on his arm. Even with his admitted limited skill set, he was given the USWA Unified World Heavyweight Championship on October 23, 1989, and held it for about two weeks.

In February and March 1990, Wright wrestled for the South Carolina-based promotion South Atlantic Pro Wrestling as "Baron Samedi".

Throughout 1990, Wright made appearances in Japan with New Japan Pro-Wrestling (NJPW) as "The Soultaker". During his appearances with NJPW, he often teamed with Crusher Bam Bam Bigelow. His opponents during his time in NJPW included Masahiro Chono, Masa Saito, and Riki Choshu.

In November 1990, Wright wrestled for the Catch Wrestling Association in Germany as "Rocky Las Vegas". In August 1991, he appeared with the Dallas, Texas-based Global Wrestling Federation as "The Soultaker".

=== World Wrestling Federation (1991–1993) ===
==== Sir Charles (1991) ====
In 1991, Wright was brought in to the World Wrestling Federation (WWF) at the suggestion of his friend The Undertaker. He made his first appearance on May 28, 1991, at a WWF Superstars of Wrestling taping in Tucson, Arizona. Wright competed there and briefly at house shows as "Sir Charles", a play on both his real name and the nickname of National Basketball Association player Charles Barkley. The character was hardly used and never developed, and even when talking about it later Wright only remembers wearing robes he purchased from another wrestler to the ring. He made a dark match appearance for the pay-per-view This Tuesday in Texas defeating Dale Wolfe.

==== Papa Shango (1992–1993) ====
In January 1992, Wright was repackaged as a heel by the name of "Papa Shango", a horror-themed voodoo practitioner with an appearance reminiscent of the loa Baron Samedi, as depicted in the 1973 film Live and Let Die. Full of cryptic rituals and an occult, culturally exotic presence, the supernatural character carried a skull to the ring billowing smoke and could control arena lights (supernatural arena lighting control heavily associated with The Undertaker gimmick, according to Wright had its origins with the Papa Shango gimmick), allowing for strange goings-on in the ring, and later could "cast spells" to cause opponents pain and to make them vomit from afar.

The Shango character debuted on the February 8, 1992, edition of Superstars, defeating enhancement talent Dale Wolfe. Shango was then thrust into the spotlight almost immediately, running in on the Hulk Hogan vs. Sid Justice main event at WrestleMania VIII. Shango actually missed his cue to run in, hitting the ring late. The finish was supposed to be Sid getting disqualified because of Shango breaking up the pinfall attempt by Hogan after he hit the big leg drop. Because Shango was late, Sid kicked out of the legdrop to save the angle. Sid's manager, Harvey Wippleman then jumped on the apron, and the referee signaled for the disqualification at that point as Shango was just getting to the ring. Ultimate Warrior then returned to the WWF by running to the ring and helping Hogan against Sid and Shango.

After WrestleMania, Sid and the Warrior were scheduled to begin a feud. Sid had previously failed a drug test and was let go by the WWF. The feud was then re-written with Shango instead of Sid, where he would cast voodoo spells on his opponent. The angle went nowhere, as Warrior challenged Randy Savage for the WWF World Heavyweight Championship at SummerSlam, with the rivalry never culminating. Meanwhile, Shango defeated Tito Santana in a dark match at the event. When Shango was finally set to have a match with Warrior in November 1992, Warrior was released from WWF. Shango received a WWF World Heavyweight Championship shot against Bret Hart (with whom he had been feuding immediately prior to Hart's World title win) on Saturday Night's Main Event XXXI, but was unsuccessful. Wright's final PPV appearance as the Papa Shango character was at the 1993 Royal Rumble (where he was eliminated in under 30 seconds). He would appear in another pay-per-view dark match against Tito Santana at WrestleMania IX, with Santana getting the victory. Shango was seen infrequently on WWF television afterwards, and following a loss to Jim Duggan in a 1993 King of the Ring qualifying match, he made two final televised appearances against enhancement talent in June and July 1993.

Wright's Papa Shango character was ridiculed by fans, being voted the Worst Gimmick and the Most Embarrassing Wrestler in the Wrestling Observer Newsletter awards for 1992. Fin Martin of professional wrestling magazine Power Slam, in a 2013 article, wrote: "Shango and his curses were a total embarrassment. Fans exhaled loudly each time he appeared on screen. Shango bombed, and deservedly so." Bret Hart liked the character and Wright's in-ring work, but found Shango's storyline with the Ultimate Warrior – in which a voodoo curse was placed on the latter – to be perhaps the second-worst creative concept in WWF history (after the introduction of The Gobbledy Gooker). Hart reported that WWF executive Pat Patterson did not like the gimmick and was responsible for its termination.

At the same time as he was wrestling as Papa Shango in the WWF, the WWF had a working agreement with USWA. As part of the agreement, Papa Shango was sent to wrestle in USWA, where he won the Unified World Heavyweight Championship for a second time. Winning the title actually upset him, as he felt it was only done to sell to the predominantly black crowd, and after complaining to management he dropped the belt to Owen Hart. He left the company soon after and returned to bartending.

During the autumn of 1994, there were rumors that the Papa Shango character would be brought back to participate in a storyline involving Bob Backlund, wherein Shango's voodoo spells would explain the traditionally good-natured Backlund's erratic and villainous behavior. This didn't come to fruition.

=== Catch Wrestling Association (1993–1994, 1995) ===
Wright as Shango defeated Ulf Herman for Otto Wanz' Catch Wrestling Association in Germany in December 1993. As Papa Shango, he wrestled a summer tour in 1994. In July, he had a shot at the CWA World Heavyweight Championship against Rambo, but lost.

A year later on December 16, 1995, he returned as Kama and defeated Viktor Kruuger.

=== Return to World Wrestling Federation (1995–1996) ===
==== Million Dollar Corporation (1995–1996) ====
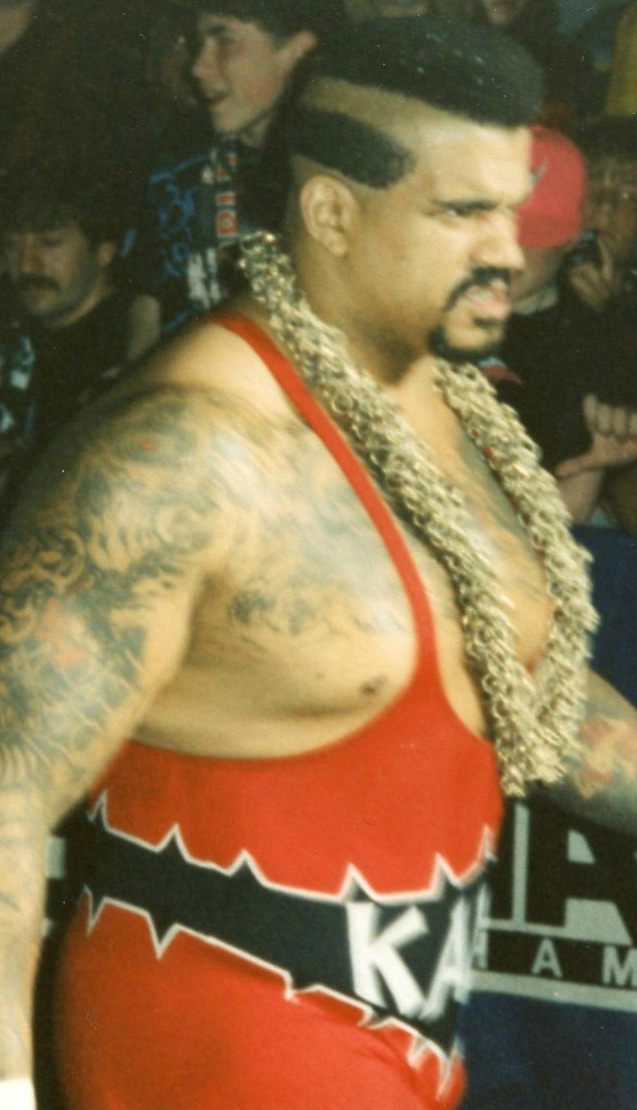
In 1995, Wright returned to the WWF under the new character of "Kama".

Wright returned to the WWF in January 1995 under the antagonistic heel gimmick of Kama (nicknamed "The Supreme Fighting Machine"), a scrappy and competitive shoot wrestler inspired by Ultimate Fighting Championship fighter Kimo Leopoldo. Shortly after his debut, he joined Ted DiBiase's Million Dollar Corporation stable. He became an immediate part of the stable's feud with The Undertaker, stealing the Undertaker's signature urn at April's WrestleMania XI then having it melted down and formed into bling, but remained in possession of the bling urn remnants until November 1995 when King Mabel seized it amid a feud with The Undertaker. He was taken off television in the fall of 1995, and after a final appearance in the 1996 Royal Rumble match, Wright left the company again.

=== National Wrestling Conference (1996) ===
Kama made a few appearances for National Wrestling Conference in Las Vegas where he feuded with Sabu.

=== Proposed WCW Run (1996) ===
Shortly after his departure, Wright had verbally agreed to join World Championship Wrestling to serve as the enforcer for the New World Order (nWo), but chose not to go to WCW after speaking to Ron Simmons. Wright then learned that WCW signed Virgil to be the nWo's enforcer by watching WCW Monday Nitro at home with his wife, and that they had signed him for less than what they offered Wright.

=== Second Return to World Wrestling Federation/Entertainment (1997–2002) ===
==== Nation of Domination (1997–1998) ====
Wright was asked to return in 1997, with the original plans being for him to revive the Papa Shango character. Instead he returned as Kama, now billed under his full name, "Kama Mustafa", joining Faarooq's faction the Nation of Domination. On the June 16 episode of Raw, Mustafa and Faarooq defeated Ahmed Johnson and The Undertaker. Mustafa became increasingly known as "The Godfather" of the Nation, a moniker which was the brainchild of Wright's wife and would become his official ring name in mid-1998. He stood with the Nation when Rocky Maivia became the leader shortly after Wrestlemania XIV, standing with Maivia, Mark Henry, D'Lo Brown, and later Owen Hart after he joined the stable in early May 1998.

In 1998, The Godfather (known to wrestlers as a genuine tough guy) competed in the WWF Brawl for All; which was a strictly voluntary boxing / shoot fighting competition, eventually won by Bart Gunn. On a July 27 episode of Raw is War, Wright debuted his "Ho’s", during a tag-match, with Nation member Mark Henry against the Legion of Doom. The Nation lasted until around September 1998 and officially disbanded in October 1998 when Henry attacked the Nation's leader The Rock. Henry, Brown and the Godfather looked to form a three-man version of the team, but at the Sunday Night Heat episode before Judgment Day: In Your House, Henry and Brown betrayed the Godfather and attacked him off guard, definitely breaking up the unit.

==== The Godfather (1998–2000) ====
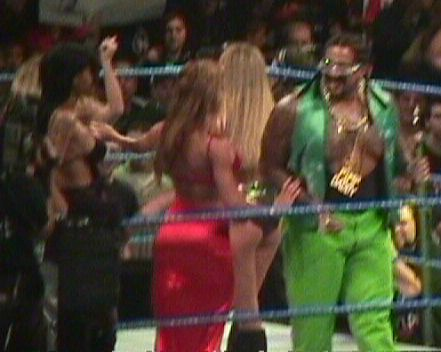
The Godfather alongside his "hoes" at a SmackDown! live show in 1999

After The Nation split up, Wright had his most successful run with the company under the persona of "The Godfather". The Godfather character was a pimp, and would be constantly surrounded by "hoes" – in reality girls from local strip clubs, actresses, or up-and-coming female wrestlers (Victoria and Lita were the best-known wrestlers to play the role, while Ivory was offered the role but was discouraged from accepting by Luna Vachon). He would offer his opponents the right to use these girls for "any purpose" if they would forfeit the match to him. The Godfather first walked out with his "hoes" on the July 27, 1998 episode of Raw Is War.

The gimmick was hugely popular with audiences, and he defeated Goldust for the WWF Intercontinental Championship on the April 12, 1999, episode of Raw Is War. He was Owen Hart's scheduled opponent for the title at Over the Edge; Hart was fatally injured during a live stunt prior to the match's time. The Godfather was scheduled to lose the title to Hart's character, "The Blue Blazer," that night. The Godfather would instead lose the title to Hart's tag team partner Jeff Jarrett a week later. On the March 16, 2000, episode of SmackDown!, he picked up the biggest win of his career, when he defeated the WWF Champion Triple H in a non-title match, due to interference from Shane McMahon and Big Show.

==== Right to Censor (2000–2001) ====
On the July 24 episode of Raw is War, The Godfather faced Bull Buchanan, member of Steven Richards' ultra-conservative stable Right To Censor, in which he agreed to give up pimping if he lost. Buchanan defeated The Godfather, who promptly joined the stable and renounced his former ways. He began to dress in a formal white shirt and tie, and became known as "The Goodfather". At SummerSlam on August 27, Right to Censor defeated Too Cool in a six-man tag team match. On the September 11 episode of Raw is War, The Goodfather and Buchanan defeated the Acolytes. After the match, Val Venis attacked the Acolytes, joining the group in the process. At Unforgiven on September 24, Right to Censor defeated the Acolytes and the Dudley Boyz. At No Mercy on October 22, The Goodfather and Buchanan entered into an elimination tag team tables match, which was won by the Dudley Boyz. The next night on Raw is War, Ivory was announced as the newest member of the group. The Goodfather and Buchanan won the WWF Tag Team Championship from the Hardy Boyz on the November 6 episode of Raw is War. At Survivor Series on November 19, The Goodfather and Buchanan teamed up with Edge and Christian, to face the Hardys and the Dudleys in a losing effort. At Rebellion on December 2, the duo retained the titles against the Hardys. They lost the titles to Edge and Christian at Armageddon on December 10 in a fatal-four-way tag team match also involving K-Kwik and Road Dogg and the Dudley Boyz.

The Goodfather entered the 2001 Royal Rumble match on January 21, 2001, at entry number 14, but was swiftly eliminated by The Rock. At WrestleMania X-Seven on April 1, The Goodfather, Buchanan and Venis were defeated by the APA (formerly the Acolytes) and Tazz. Also at WrestleMania, Ivory lost the WWF Women's Championship to Chyna. On the April 26 episode of SmackDown!, Right to Censor lost to the Brothers of Destruction in a 4-on-2 handicap match, after all other members walked out on Richards mid-match. The Goodfather would continue to team with Buchanan, until the June 17 episode of Sunday Night Heat, where they lost to the Dudley Boyz. The last time Wright would be seen on television was where he along with Buchanan and several WWF superstars attacked invading WCW wrestlers Chuck Palumbo and Sean O'Haire on an episode of SmackDown! For the remainder of the year, The Goodfather was completely absent from WWF programming.

==== Return of The Godfather; departure (2002) ====
The Godfather, under his old gimmick and with his hos, returned at the 2002 Royal Rumble competing in the Rumble match. He was eliminated by Chuck and Christian. During the next six months, Wright competed in several television matches, usually on Raw, Heat and SmackDown!'s sister show Velocity. The Godfather wrestled his final match on the June 8 episode of Velocity, defeating Hugh Morrus. On the October 7, 2002, episode of Raw he made an appearance in a match between Jerry Lawler and his former Right To Censor teammate, Steven Richards in which the winner would get a night with the Godfather's hos. This would be his final appearance on WWE programming for the next three years as Wright was released from the WWE in December 2002.

==== Sporadic appearances (2005–present) ====
On July 13, 2007, Wright returned to the ring for the first time in five years after his retirement, where he reunited with D'Lo Brown to defeat Jeremy and Bubba Blanchard in McMinnville, Oregon.

In 2007, Wright appeared for WWE at the Theodore Long and Kristal Marshall wedding ceremony on the edition of September 21, 2007, of SmackDown!, where he tried to convince Long and Ron Simmons to go back to the old partying days they had. After they refused, Godfather left the ceremony with his Ho Train, and was accompanied by every male wrestler in attendance and commentator John Bradshaw Layfield, leaving only Mr. McMahon, Jonathan Coachman, Hornswoggle, Gerald Brisco, Pat Patterson, Michael Cole and several Divas behind. Wright reappeared on WWE television during the McMahon family portrait during Raw's 15th Anniversary on December 10, 2007, where he let Hornswoggle join his Ho Train.

In January 2013, Wright made a short appearance with WWE as The Godfather at the 2013 Royal Rumble as entrant #17. He was eliminated immediately by Dolph Ziggler.

On the January 6, 2014 "Old School" edition of Raw, Wright made an appearance alongside numerous other legends and Hall of Famers.

On February 22, 2016, it was announced that Wright would be inducted into the WWE Hall of Fame class of 2016, under his Godfather persona.

In June 2016, Wright appeared (as Papa Shango) on a season two episode of WWE Swerved on the WWE Network along with The Boogeyman, pranking people inside a shopping mall.

He appeared on January 22, 2018, at Raw's 25th anniversary show, in a backstage segment with his former teammate Mark Henry. Later that year, Wright reprised both his Godfather and Papa Shango personas on the House Hardy Halloween special airing on the WWE Network on October 28, 2018. Wright appeared at the WWE Raw Reunion show on July 22, 2019.

On November 22, 2020, he made an appearance at Survivor Series during The Undertaker's retirement ceremony.

On February 1, 2025, he was shown at ringside amongst other legends during the Royal Rumble.

=== Late career (2002–2020, 2024) ===
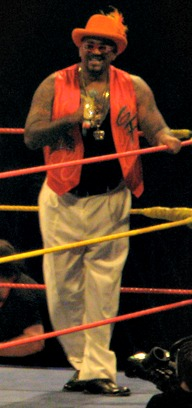
The Godfather at the Hulkamania: Let The Battle Begin tour in November 2009.

In late 2009, Wright returned to wrestling to take part in Hulk Hogan's "Hulkamania: Let The Battle Begin" tour of Australia. On November 21, Wright, using the new ring name "The Pimp Fatha", teamed with Nick Dinsmore to defeat Rock of Love (Billy Blade and Kadin Anthony) in a tag team match. On November 24, Big Daddy Row Row defeated Pimp Fatha and Sean Morley in a three-way match. Two days later, Pimp Fatha defeated Heidenreich. After the match, he hosted a bikini contest which was won by Lacey von Erich. Two days later, Pimp Fatha wrestled his last match on the tour and was defeated by Sean Morley.

In January 2012, Wright won a battle royal at Pro Wrestling Superstars in Los Angeles.

Wright made a rare in-ring segment along with his longtime friend Val Venis and Dexter Verity in Future Stars of Wrestling, where he promised to bring his hoes if Venis and Verity would have succeeded defending their tag team titles. In September 2013, Wright resumed wrestling on the independent circuit.

In spring of 2014 Wright made two appearances for Preston City Wrestling in England, as Papa Shango working against local star Bubblegum on both nights. In October 2014 at Elite Canadian Championship Wrestling (ECCW) Halloween Hell, Wright teamed with his old partner, Val Venis to face the team of then-ECCW Tag Team Champions Jordie Taylor and Daniel Adonis and the team of Ladies Choice and Eric Locker in a three-way elimination tag team match, but unsuccessful. Wright would step down from wrestling in March 2020 when COVID-19 hit.

On April 26, 2024, Wright returned as Papa Shango when he defeated This Guy in Burwood East, New South Wales, Australia for Battle Championship Wrestling.

== Professional wrestling style and persona ==
According to Wright, the Papa Shango character uses paint because Vince McMahon said his face did not match his body. During his last WWE appearances as The Godfather, where he would usually be accompanied by a group of girls referred to as the "Ho Train", Wright appeared sans girls. According to him, it was done because times had changed and the character was phased out.

== Personal life ==
Wright attended the University of Nevada, Reno where he was an offensive tackle on the football team. After leaving professional wrestling, Wright moved to Las Vegas where he managed the Cheetah's strip club. He married his girlfriend Denise in September 2000, they have four children together. His marriage to Denise is his third marriage.

== Championships and accomplishments ==
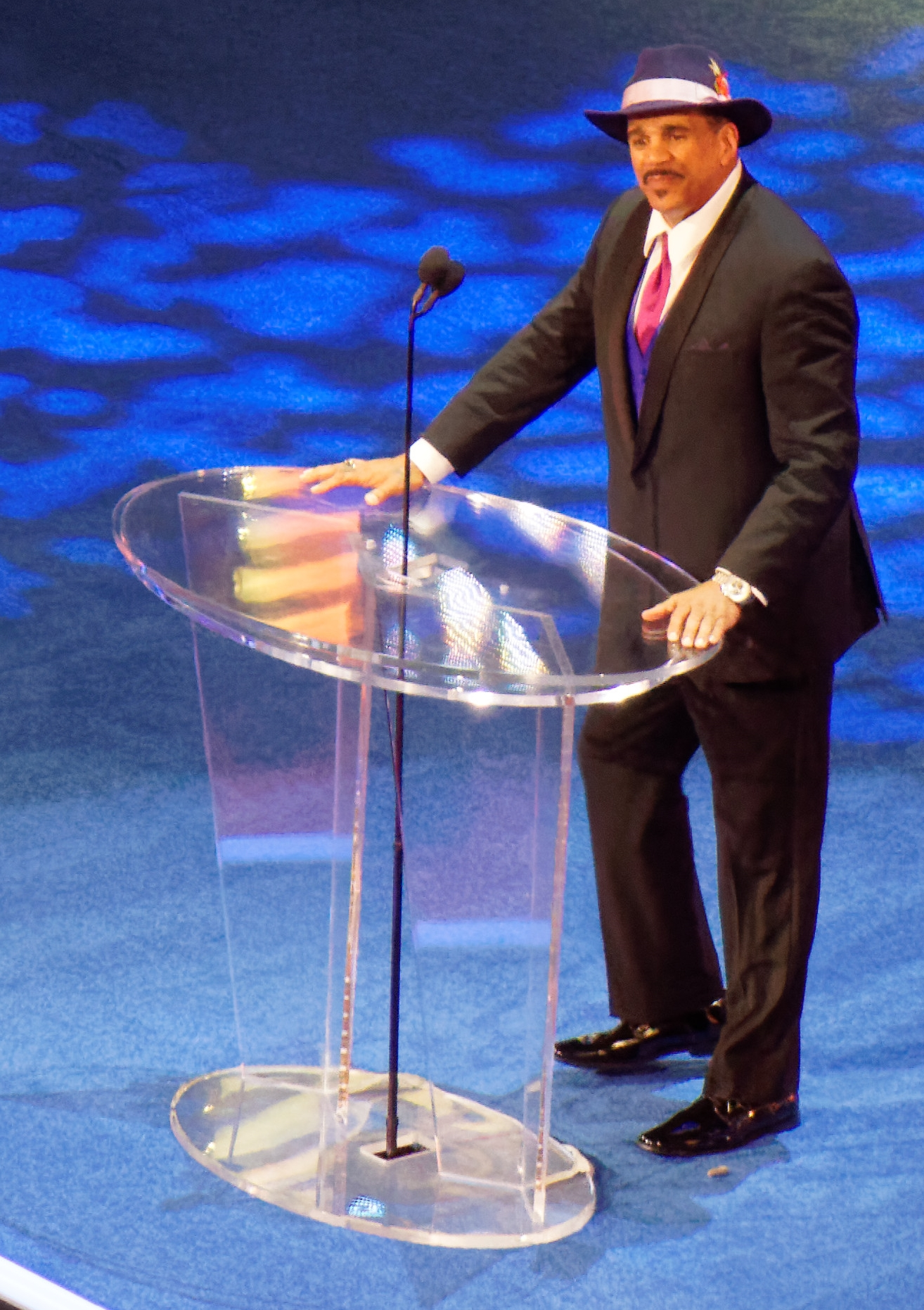
The Godfather was inducted into the WWE Hall of Fame in 2016.

- Pro Wrestling Illustrated
  - Ranked No. 61 of the 500 top wrestlers in the PWI 500 in 1999
  - Ranked No. 353 of the 500 top wrestlers of the "PWI Years" in 2003
- United States Wrestling Association
  - USWA Unified World Heavyweight Championship (2 times)
- Vendetta Pro Wrestling
  - Vendetty Award for Co-Special Guest star of the Year – with Chavo Guerrero Sr. and Chavo Guerrero Jr. (2014)
- World Wrestling Federation / WWE
  - WWF Intercontinental Championship (1 time)
  - WWF Tag Team Championship (1 time) – with Bull Buchanan
  - WWE Hall of Fame (Class of 2016)
- Wrestling Observer Newsletter
  - Worst Gimmick (1992) as Papa Shango
  - Worst Feud of the Year (1992) vs. The Ultimate Warrior
  - Most Embarrassing Wrestler (1992)
