= Robert Maillet =

Canadian professional wrestler and actor (born 1969)

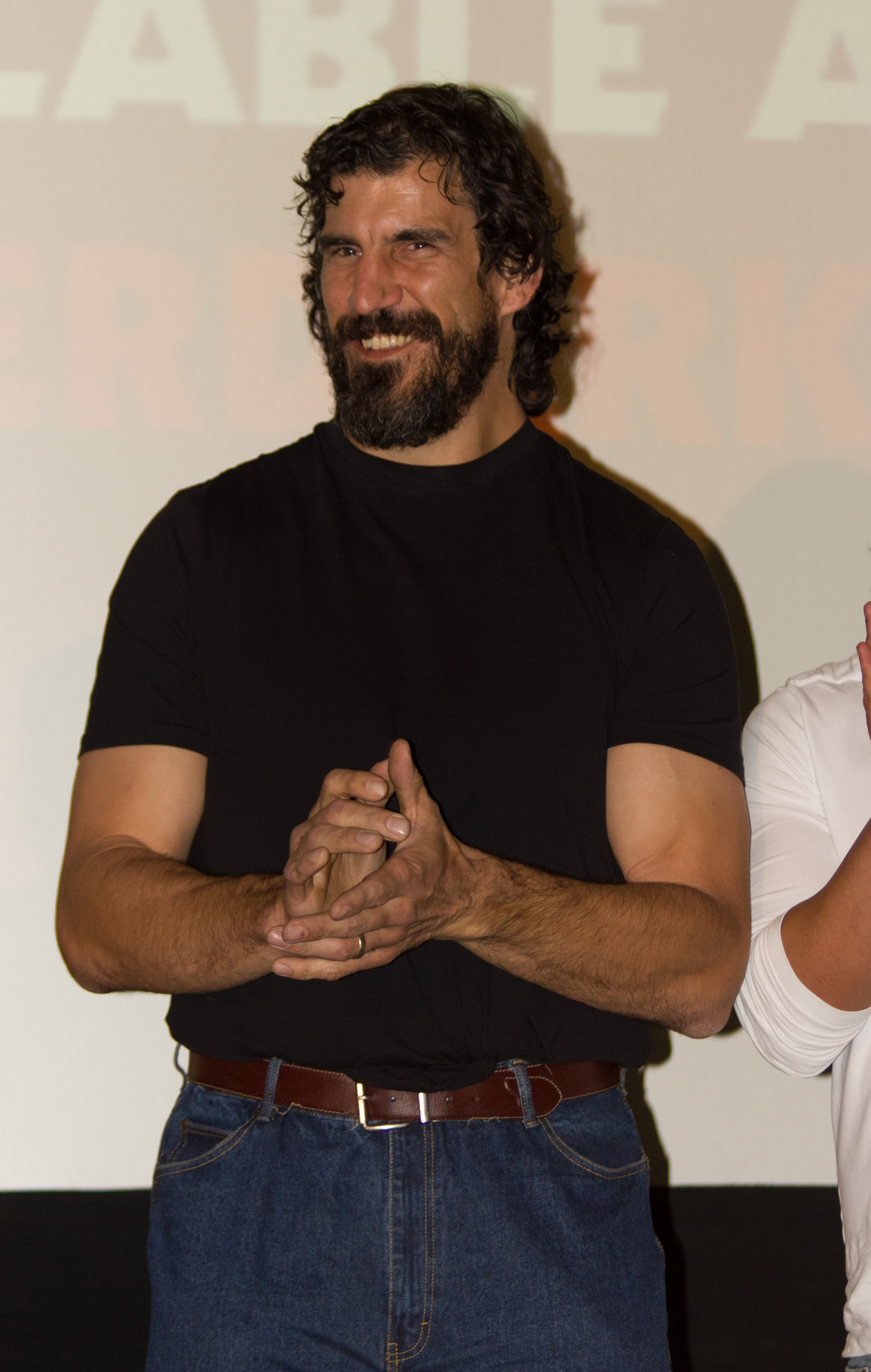
- Maillet at the Monster Brawl premiere in 2011

Personal information
- Born: Robert Maillet; 26 October 1969 (age 56) Georgetown, Ontario, Canada
- Spouse: Laura Eaton (m. 1997)
- Children: 1

Professional wrestling career
- Ring name(s): Acadian Giant; Giant Kurgan; Goliath El Gigante; Goliath The Kurrgan; Goliath Kurrgan; The Interrogator; Kurgan; Kurrgan; Kurrgan The Interrogator
- Billed height: 7 ft 0 in (213 cm)
- Billed weight: 350 lb (159 kg)
- Billed from: South Africa (as The Interrogator)
- Trained by: Stephen Petitpas; Paul Peller; Bret Hart; Leo Burke
- Debut: 1989
- Retired: 2011

Robert Maillet (born 26 October 1969) is a Canadian actor and retired professional wrestler. He is known for his time in the World Wrestling Federation (WWF) from 1997 to 1999, where he performed under the ring name Kurrgan and was a member of The Truth Commission and The Oddities. He is also known for his roles in films such as 300 (2006), Sherlock Holmes (2009), Immortals (2011), Pacific Rim (2013), Brick Mansions (2014), Hercules (2014), and Deadpool 2 (2018).

== Early life ==
Maillet was born into an Acadian family in Georgetown, Ontario, northwest of Toronto. Less than a year later, his family moved to the majority-Acadian village of Ste-Marie-de-Kent, New Brunswick.

== Professional wrestling career ==
=== Early career (1989–1997) ===
He began wrestling as the Acadian Giant in the early 90s. Maillet made an initial appearance in the WWF on November 11, 1991, when he wrestled as The Cajun Giant, defeating Bob Bradley in a dark match at a television taping in Utica, NY. He worked for Super World of Sports as Giant Goliath in 1991. He also spent some time working for the Japanese W*ING promotion as Goliath El Gigante.

=== World Wrestling Federation (1997–1999) ===
He was signed to the WWF in 1997, alongside The Jackyl, as a member of The Truth Commission. The group was sent to the United States Wrestling Association (USWA) before being called up to the main WWF roster in June of that year, where Maillet's ring name evolved into The Interrogator and later to Kurrgan (whose name was inspired by The Kurgan in November 1997, and was occasionally referred to as Kurrgan the Interrogator on television). Under the tutelage of The Jackyl, a charismatic cult leader, Kurrgan was a heel known for applying the Iron Claw to his opponents and not breaking the hold until The Jackyl slapped him across the face.

After The Truth Commission disbanded in March 1998, Maillet (now billed simply as Kurrgan) continued as a singles wrestler managed by The Jackyl. He later went on to be part of The Oddities, The Jackyl's new stable; however, once The Jackyl was removed as the advisor of The Oddities and replaced by the Insane Clown Posse, The Oddities turned face and became fan favourites. Kurrgan was taken off WWF TV in February 1999 and was later released that November.

=== Mexico and Canada (1999–2001) ===
After WWF, Kurrgan worked in Mexico CMLL as Gigante Kurrgan. He also worked in the Independents in Canada working in Nova Scotia, Calgary and British Columbia. By the end of 2001, Kurrgan took a hiatus from wrestling.

=== Later career (2005–2011) ===
Maillet returned to wrestling working for Jacques Rougeau's wrestling events in Quebec as Kurgan. On July 8, 2005, he lost to Jim Duggan in Montreal. He continued working in Quebec and other parts of Canada until he retired from wrestling in 2011.

== Acting career ==
Maillet appeared in the 2006 film 300, an adaptation of Frank Miller's graphic novel of the same name. He played the Über-Immortal, a savage berserker who was part of the enemy's imperial guard. In November 2008, during a fight scene for the 2009 film Sherlock Holmes, he accidentally punched Robert Downey Jr. in the face, bloodying Downey and knocking him down. Downey later stated on an episode of the Late Show with David Letterman that Maillet was "10 times more upset about it" than he was.

Maillet played a Russian professional boxer who takes a dive in the 2011 film The Big Bang. Later that year, he appeared in the film Monster Brawl as Frankenstein in a wrestling tournament of eight classic monsters that fight to the death. He played Polyphemus in the 2013 film Percy Jackson: Sea of Monsters, Blackwell in the 2013 film adaptation of The Mortal Instruments: City of Bones, and the executioner in the 2014 film Hercules.

He also had a recurring role on the Syfy original series Haven billed as a "Heavy", a thug for the series antagonist. In 2018, Maillet had a small part in the superhero film Deadpool 2 as Sluggo, a mutant mercenary who is in prison alongside the titular character. He also had a part in the 2018 Netflix film Game Over, Man!. He appeared in the 2020 thriller film Becky, alongside Kevin James in a rare non-comedic role.

== Personal life ==
Maillet has been married to Laura Eaton since June 14, 1997. He has two stepdaughters, as well as a daughter adopted from Ethiopia. Being an Acadian, his first language is French and he is conversant in English.

== Filmography ==
=== Film ===
Year	Title	Role	Director	Notes
2006	300	Über-Immortal	Zack Snyder	MTV Movie Award for Best Fight (vs. Gerard Butler)
2009	Sherlock Holmes	Dredger	Guy Ritchie	
2011	The Big Bang	Anton Protopov	Tony Krantz	
2011	Monster Brawl	Frankenstein	Jesse Thomas Cook	
2011	Immortals	Minotaur	Tarsem Singh	
2012	A Little Bit Zombie	Terry Thompkins	Casey Walker	
2013	The Mortal Instruments: City of Bones	Samuel Blackwell	Harald Zwart	
2013	Septic Man	Giant	Jesse T. Cook	
2013	The Young and Prodigious Spivet	Giant Hobo	Jean-Pierre Jeunet	Uncredited
2013	Percy Jackson: Sea of Monsters	Polyphemus & Laistrygonian	Thor Freudenthal	
2013	Pacific Rim	Lieutenant Aleksei Kaidonovsky	Guillermo del Toro	
2014	Brick Mansions	Yeti	Camille Delamarre	
2014	Hercules	Executioner	Brett Ratner	
2015	Rabid Dogs	Bear Man #2	Éric Hannezo	
2016	Killer Waves	Ben "Barracuda Ben"	James Balsamo	
2018	Game Over, Man!	Tall Thug	Kyle Newacheck	
2018	Deadpool 2	Sluggo	David Leitch	
2019	Polar	Karl	Jonas Åkerlund	
2020	Becky	"Apex"	Jonathan Milott; Cary Murnion	
2020	Vicious Fun	Mike	Cody Callahan	

=== Television ===
Year	Title	Role	Notes
2001	Lexx	Leroy	Episode: "Fluff Daddy"
2003	Liocracy	Behemoth Jones	Episode: "Say Uncle"
2011	Merlin	Derian	Episode: "His Father’s Son"
2011	Once Upon a Time	Behemoth	Episode: "The Shepherd"
2012	Transporter: The Series	Momo	Episode: "City of Love"
2013, 2015	Haven	Heavy	5 episodes; also credited as Robert Norman Maillet in Season 5
2014–2015	The Strain	The Master / Jusef Sardu	11 episodes
2014	Dark Rising: Warrior of Worlds	Bedard	5 episodes
2019	American Gods	Balor	Episode: "Treasure of the Sun"
2020	Titans	Ring Fighter	Episode: "Faux Hawk"
2020	The Umbrella Academy	"Lights Out" Lubbock	Episode: "The Swedish Job"
2021	Jupiter's Legacy	Big Man	Episode: "Painting the Clouds with Sunshine"

== In other media ==
In 1998 and 1999, Jakks Pacific released three action figures based on Maillet's WWF personas. His Truth Commission persona, the Interrogator, was released in a 1998 WWF 2 Tuff Series 1 two-pack with Recon. A second WWF 2 Tuff release paired Kurrgan with The Jackyl, followed by a solo Kurrgan figure depicting his Oddities persona in the 1999 WWF Summer Slam 99: Deadly Games line.

Maillet's WWF persona Kurrgan appears as a playable character in the 1999 professional wrestling video game WWF Attitude. His selectable attires include outfits representing his time with The Oddities, as well as his earlier Truth Commission uniform.

== Championships and accomplishments ==
- Atlantic Grand Prix Wrestling
  - AGPW Continental Championship (1 time)
- NWA: Extreme Canadian Championship Wrestling
  - NWA/ECCW Heavyweight Championship (2 times)
- Legend City Wrestling
  - LCW Newfoundland Tag Team Championship (1 time) – with Mr. Fantastic
- Real Action Wrestling
  - RAW Heavyweight Championship (1 time)
- United States Wrestling Association
  - USWA World Tag Team Championship (3 times) – with Recon
- Wrestling Observer Newsletter awards
  - Worst Tag Team (1998) – with Golga
  - Worst Gimmick (1998) – as Kurrgan, as part of The Oddities
- World Wrestling Association (South Korea)
  - WWA World Heavyweight Championship (1 time)

== See also ==
- List of tallest people
