= Rougeau =

Rougeau is a Canadian surname. Notable people with this surname include:

- Armand Rougeau (born 1961), former professional wrestler
- Jacques Rougeau (born 1960), retired French-Canadian professional wrestler
- Jean Rougeau (1929–1983), professional wrestler better known as Johnny Rougeau
- Lauriane Rougeau (born 1990), Canadian ice hockey player
- Raymond Rougeau (born 1955), Canadian wrestler, French language TV presenter and commentator
- René Duprée (born 1983), or René Rougeau, Canadian professional wrestler
- René Rougeau (born 1986), American professional basketball player
- Vincent Rougeau (born 1963), American scholar of law and theology and academic administrator

== See also ==
- The Fabulous Rougeaus, the professional wrestling tag team of real-life brothers Jacques and Raymond Rougeau
- Rougeau wrestling family, family of Canadian professional wrestlers
- Jean Rougeau Trophy, Quebec Major Junior Hockey League annual award
