= Iron man match =

Professional wrestling match type

An iron man match is a professional wrestling match type that is set to go a specific amount of time, usually 30 or 60 minutes, with the competitor with the most falls at the end of that time named the victor. On the occasions of a draw, a sudden death "final fall" may be requested by either side, with the other able to accept or decline, or an authority can order the match to go into overtime in the case of any championship match.

== Rules ==
Iron man matches generally operate under the same rules as any other professional wrestling bout, but instead of the match having to be over before a time limit is up, the iron man match goes the full length of the allotted time, with each wrestler attempting to score as many falls in that time as possible. The wrestler who has the most decisions at the end of the match is declared the winner. Iron Man matches can also be contested with specific win conditions. Kurt Angle and Chris Benoit competed in a 30-minute Iron Man match at Backlash 2001 where only submissions were counted, which was termed an "Ultimate Submission match".

Some iron man matches have an interval between falls. In 2009, a match between John Cena and Randy Orton had a 30-second rest period after each fall, in part due to that match being billed as "anything goes" (only pinfalls and submissions counted as falls, which can also be done outside the ring, but not count outs or disqualifications). The 2003 match between Kurt Angle and Brock Lesnar had a 15-second rest period after each fall, regardless of how it occurred.

Should the match result in a tie, sudden death overtime may be requested by either wrestler as a plot device, and it is accepted or rejected by either an opponent or an authority figure. After Shawn Michaels and Kurt Angle tied 2–2 in a 30-minute iron man match, Michaels begged Angle to go sudden death, but Angle walked off.

Sudden deaths are especially common in title matches. This is because, in the event of a draw, the champion will always retain the title. Commissioner Gorilla Monsoon ordered sudden death (after onscreen president "Rowdy" Roddy Piper had stated that there "must be a winner") after Shawn Michaels and Bret Hart failed to score a decision at WrestleMania XII, and Christopher Daniels requested sudden death against A.J. Styles at TNA's Against All Odds in February 2005.

== Iron man match history ==
=== World Wrestling Entertainment (WWE) ===
Several Iron Man matches have taken place at house shows. The Rockers faced off against The Fabulous Rougeaus several times in 1989, when the match was previously known as a "Marathon match". Bret Hart wrestled one in 1993 against Ric Flair and four in 1994 against his brother, Owen Hart. John Cena and Seth Rollins faced off in a 30-minute Iron Man match for the WWE United States Championship at a house show in October 2015. Kevin Owens and AJ Styles faced off in a 30-minute Iron Man match for the WWE Intercontinental Championship at a house show in March 2016.

#	Match (length)	Title	Score	Event, date and location	Arena
1	The Rockers (Shawn Michaels and Marty Jannetty) defeated The Fabulous Rougeaus (Jacques Rougeau and Raymond Rougeau) (1:00:00)	None	3–2	WWF live event August 4, 1989, Montreal, Quebec, Canada	Montreal Forum
2	The Rockers (Shawn Michaels and Marty Jannetty) defeated The Fabulous Rougeaus (Jacques Rougeau and Raymond Rougeau) (1:00:00)	None	Unknown	WWF live event August 6, 1989, Rosemont, Illinois	Rosemont Horizon
3	The Rockers (Shawn Michaels and Marty Jannetty) defeated The Fabulous Rougeaus (Jacques Rougeau and Raymond Rougeau) (1:00:00) "Marathon match"	None	Unknown	WWF live event August 19, 1989, Philadelphia, Pennsylvania	Philadelphia Spectrum
4	The Rockers (Shawn Michaels and Marty Jannetty) defeated The Fabulous Rougeaus (Jacques Rougeau and Raymond Rougeau) (1:00:00) "Marathon match"	None	3–2	WWF live event September 9, 1989, Boston, Massachusetts	Boston Garden
5	The Rockers (Shawn Michaels and Marty Jannetty) defeated The Fabulous Rougeaus (Jacques Rougeau and Raymond Rougeau) (1:00:00) "Marathon match"	None	Unknown	WWF live event October 8, 1989, Washington, D.C.	D.C. Armory
6	The Rockers (Shawn Michaels and Marty Jannetty) defeated The Fabulous Rougeaus (Jacques Rougeau and Raymond Rougeau) (1:00:00) "Marathon match"	None	Unknown	WWF live event October 20, 1989, Uniondale, New York	Nassau Veterans Memorial Coliseum
7	The Rockers (Shawn Michaels and Marty Jannetty) defeated The Fabulous Rougeaus (Jacques Rougeau and Raymond Rougeau) (1:00:00) "Marathon match"	None	3–2	WWF live event November 17, 1989, West Palm Beach, Florida	West Palm Beach Auditorium
8	Bret Hart (c) defeated Ric Flair (1:00:00)	WWF World Heavyweight Championship	3–2	WWF live event January 9, 1993, Boston, Massachusetts	Boston Garden
9	Bret Hart (c) defeated Owen Hart (1:00:00)	WWF World Heavyweight Championship	3–2	WWF live event July 8, 1994, East Rutherford, New Jersey	Brendan Byrne Arena
10	Bret Hart (c) defeated Owen Hart (1:08:23) Overtime	WWF World Heavyweight Championship	3–2	WWF live event July 9, 1994, Uniondale, New York	Nassau Veterans Memorial Coliseum
11	Bret Hart (c) defeated Owen Hart (1:00:00)	WWF World Heavyweight Championship	2–1	WWF live event July 29, 1994, Los Angeles, California	Great Western Forum
12	Bret Hart (c) defeated Owen Hart (1:00:00)	WWF World Heavyweight Championship	2–1	WWF live event August 6, 1994, Philadelphia, Pennsylvania	Philadelphia Spectrum
13	Shawn Michaels defeated Bret Hart (c) (1:01:56) Overtime	WWF World Heavyweight Championship	1–0	WrestleMania XII; March 31, 1996, Anaheim, California	Arrowhead Pond
14	Triple H defeated The Rock (c) (1:00:00)	WWF Championship	6–5	Judgment Day; May 21, 2000, Louisville, Kentucky	Freedom Hall
15	Chris Benoit defeated Kurt Angle (31:51) Overtime "Ultimate Submission match"	None	4–3	Backlash; April 29, 2001, Rosemont, Illinois	Allstate Arena
16	Brock Lesnar defeated Kurt Angle (c) (1:00:00)	WWE Championship	5–4	SmackDown; September 18, 2003, Raleigh, North Carolina	RBC Center
17	Chris Benoit (c) defeated Triple H (1:00:00)	World Heavyweight Championship	4–3	Raw; July 26, 2004, Pittsburgh, Pennsylvania	Mellon Arena
18	MNM (Johnny Nitro and Joey Mercury) (c) defeated Charlie Haas and Hardcore Holly (15:00)	WWE Tag Team Championship	2–1	SmackDown; June 2, 2005, Edmonton, Alberta, Canada	Rexall Place
19	Kurt Angle drew with Shawn Michaels (30:00)	None	2–2	Raw; October 3, 2005, Dallas, Texas	American Airlines Center
20	John Morrison and The Miz (c) drew with Jimmy Wang Yang and Shannon Moore (15:00) "Fifteen Minutes of Fame match"	WWE Tag Team Championship	1–1	ECW; January 8, 2008, Philadelphia, Pennsylvania	Wachovia Center
21	John Cena defeated Randy Orton (c) (1:00:00) "Anything Goes Ironman match"	WWE Championship	6–5	Bragging Rights; October 25, 2009, Pittsburgh, Pennsylvania	Mellon Arena
22	Bayley (c) defeated Sasha Banks (30:00)	NXT Women's Championship	3–2	NXT TakeOver: Respect; October 7, 2015, Winter Park, Florida	Full Sail University
23	John Cena (c) defeated Seth Rollins (30:00)	WWE United States Championship	3–2	WWE live event October 17, 2015, Lubbock, Texas	United Supermarkets Arena
24	Kevin Owens (c) defeated AJ Styles (30:00)	WWE Intercontinental Championship	2–1	WWE live event March 12, 2016, Atlantic City, New Jersey	Boardwalk Hall
25	Charlotte Flair defeated Sasha Banks (c) (34:45) Overtime	WWE Raw Women's Championship	3–2	Roadblock: End of the Line; December 18, 2016, Pittsburgh, Pennsylvania	PPG Paints Arena
26	Cesaro and Sheamus (c) defeated The Hardy Boyz (Jeff Hardy and Matt Hardy) (30:00)	WWE Raw Tag Team Championship	4–3	Great Balls of Fire; July 9, 2017, Dallas, Texas	American Airlines Center
27	Dolph Ziggler (c) defeated Seth Rollins (30:10) Overtime	WWE Intercontinental Championship	5–4	Extreme Rules; July 15, 2018, Pittsburgh, Pennsylvania	PPG Paints Arena
28	Finn Bálor vs. Adam Cole vs. Tommaso Ciampa vs. Johnny Gargano ended in a draw between Bálor and Cole (1:00:00) NXT General Manager William Regal called the match a tie after both Cole and Bálor scored 2 falls, and they both had a match with each other the following Tuesday on NXT Super Tuesday II for the vacant NXT Championship.	Vacant NXT Championship	2–2–1–1	NXT Super Tuesday; September 1, 2020, Winter Park, Florida	Full Sail University
29	A-Kid defeated Jordan Devlin (30:00)	None	2–1	NXT UK; August 5, 2021, London, England	BT Sports Studios

==== Participant list ====
===== Males =====
Wrestler	Victories	Appearances
Shawn Michaels	8	9
Marty Jannetty	7	7
Bret Hart	5	6
Chris Benoit	2	2
John Cena	2	2
Brock Lesnar	1	1
Joey Mercury	1	1
Kevin Owens	1	1
Cesaro	1	1
Sheamus	1	1
Dolph Ziggler	1	1
A-Kid	1	1
Triple H	1	2
Johnny Nitro/John Morrison	1	2
Ric Flair	0	1
The Rock	0	1
Charlie Haas	0	1
Hardcore Holly	0	1
The Miz	0	1
Jimmy Wang Yang	0	1
Shannon Moore	0	1
Randy Orton	0	1
AJ Styles	0	1
Jeff Hardy	0	1
Matt Hardy	0	1
Finn Bálor	0	1
Adam Cole	0	1
Johnny Gargano	0	1
Tommaso Ciampa	0	1
Jordan Devlin	0	1
Seth Rollins	0	2
Kurt Angle	0	3
Owen Hart	0	4
Jacques Rougeau	0	7
Raymond Rougeau	0	7

===== Females =====
Wrestler	Victories	Appearances
Bayley	1	1
Charlotte Flair	1	1
Sasha Banks	0	2

=== All Elite Wrestling (AEW) ===
#	Match (length)	Title	Score	Event, date and location	Arena
1	Kenny Omega defeated Pac (31:01) Overtime	None	2–1	Dynamite; February 26, 2020, Independence, Missouri	Silverstein Eye Centers Arena
2	MJF (c) defeated Bryan Danielson (1:05:02) Overtime	AEW World Championship	4–3	Revolution; March 5, 2023, San Francisco, California	Chase Center

==== Participant list ====
Wrestler	Victories	Appearances
Kenny Omega	1	1
MJF	1	1
Pac	0	1
Bryan Danielson	0	1

=== Total Nonstop Action Wrestling (TNA) / Impact Wrestling ===
#	Match (length)	Title	Score	Event, date and location	Arena
1	A.J. Styles (c) defeated Christopher Daniels (31:37) overtime	TNA X Division Championship	2–1	Against All Odds; February 13, 2005, Orlando, Florida	TNA Impact! Zone
2	A.J. Styles (c) defeated Christopher Daniels (30:00)	TNA X Division Championship	1–0	Bound for Glory; October 23, 2005; Orlando, Florida	TNA Impact! Zone
3	Kurt Angle defeated Samoa Joe (30:00)	To determine the No. 1 contender for the NWA World Heavyweight Championship	3–2	Final Resolution; January 14, 2007; Orlando, Florida	TNA Impact! Zone
4	Douglas Williams (c) drew with A.J. Styles (15:00 + 5:00 sudden overtime)	TNA Television Championship	1–1	TNA Impact! December 23, 2010; Orlando, Florida	TNA Impact! Zone
5	Bobby Roode (c) drew with A.J. Styles (30:00)	TNA World Heavyweight Championship	3–3	Final Resolution; December 11, 2011; Orlando, Florida	TNA Impact! Zone
6	Bobby Roode (c) defeated A.J. Styles (5:00 + sudden death overtime)	TNA World Heavyweight Championship	1–0	TNA Impact Wrestling; December 15, 2011; Orlando, Florida	TNA Impact! Zone
7	The Wolves (Eddie Edwards and Davey Richards) defeated Dirty Heels (Austin Aries and Bobby Roode) (30:00)	Vacant TNA World Tag Team Championship	2–1	TNA Impact Wrestling; July 1, 2015; Orlando, Florida	TNA Impact! Zone
8	Lashley defeated Eddie Edwards (c) (30:00)	TNA World Heavyweight Championship	3–2	TNA Impact Wrestling; January 26, 2017; Orlando, Florida	TNA Impact! Zone
9	Deonna Purrazzo (c) defeated Jordynne Grace (30:00)	Impact Knockouts Championship	2–1	Emergence; August 25, 2020; Nashville, Tennessee	Skyway Studios
10	Josh Alexander (c) defeated TJP (61:55) overtime	Impact X Division Championship	2–1	Before the Impact / Impact! June 3, 2021; Nashville, Tennessee	Skyway Studios
11	Nic Nemeth (c) defeated Josh Alexander (60:00)	TNA World Championship	3–2	Emergence; August 30, 2024; Louisville, Kentucky	Old Forester's Paristown Hall

==== Males ====
Wrestler	Victories	Appearances
A.J. Styles	2	5
Kurt Angle	1	1
Davey Richards	1	1
Lashley	1	1
Nic Nemeth	1	1
Josh Alexander	1	2
Eddie Edwards	1	2
Bobby Roode	1	3
Samoa Joe	0	1
Douglas Williams	0	1
Austin Aries	0	1
TJP	0	1
Christopher Daniels	0	2

==== Females ====
Wrestler	Victories	Appearances
Deonna Purrazzo	1	1
Jordynne Grace	0	1

=== Ring of Honor ===
#	Match (length)	Title	Score	Event, date and location	Arena
1	Low Ki defeated Christopher Daniels, Doug Williams, and Spanky (60:00)	Tournament final for the inaugural ROH Championship	3–2– -1– -1	Crowning a Champion; July 27, 2002, Philadelphia, Pennsylvania	Murphy Recreation Center
2	American Dragon defeated Doug Williams (30:00)	None	1–0	Scramble Madness; November 16, 2002; Wakefield, Massachusetts	American Civic Center
3	Austin Aries defeated Roderick Strong (30:00)	None	4–3	Reckless Abandon; November 30, 2007; Dayton, Ohio	Montgomery County Fairgrounds Coliseum
4	Dave Mastiff (c) vs. Adam Cole ended in a double disqualification (30:47) overtime	PCW Championship	4–4	ROH x PCW: SuperShow of Honor 2 November 28, 2015; City of Preston, Lancashire, England	Evoque
5	Jay Lethal (c) defeated Jonathan Gresham (30:00)	ROH World Championship	2–1	Ring of Honor Wrestling; September 8, 2018; Atlanta, Georgia	Center Stage
6	Jay Lethal and Jonathan Gresham defeated Lifeblood (Mark Haskins and Tracy Williams) (30:00)	None	2–1	Masters of the Craft; April 14, 2019; Columbus, Ohio	Express Live!
7	Lee Moriarty defeated Nigel McGuinness (31:59) overtime	None	5–4	Final Battle; December 6, 2025; Columbus, Ohio	Greater Columbus Convention Center

==== Participant list ====
Wrestler	Victories	Appearances
Jay Lethal	2	2
Low Ki	1	1
American Dragon	1	1
Austin Aries	1	1
Lee Moriarty	1	1
Jonathan Gresham	1	2
Adam Cole	0	1
Dave Mastiff	0	1
Christopher Daniels	0	1
Spanky	0	1
Roderick Strong	0	1
Mark Haskins	0	1
Tracy Williams	0	1
Nigel McGuinness	0	1
Doug Williams	0	2

=== Revolution Pro Wrestling (RevPro) ===
#	Match (length)	Title	Score	Event, date and location	Arena
1	Zozaya defeated Leon Slater (01:03:02); Overtime	None	3–2	Uprising; December 21, 2024, London, England	York Hall
2	Kanji defeated Rhio (30:00) by knockout "Iron Fist match"	None	3–4	Live in Sheffield; July 12, 2026, Sheffield, England	The Network

==== Participant list ====
Wrestler	Victories	Appearances
Zozaya	1	1
Kanji	1	1
Leon Slater	0	1
Rhio	0	1

=== New Japan Pro-Wrestling (NJPW) ===
#	Match (length)	Title	Score	Event, date and location	Arena
1	Tomohiro Ishii defeated Gabe Kidd (c) (34:05); Overtime	Strong Openweight Championship	2–1	Windy City Riot; April 11, 2025, Chicago, Illinois	Wintrust Arena

==== Participant list ====
Wrestler	Victories	Appearances
Tomohiro Ishii	1	1
Gabe Kidd	0	1

=== World Championship Wrestling (WCW) ===
#	Match (length)	Title	Score	Event, date and location	Arena
1	Ricky Steamboat defeated Rick Rude (30:00) "Iron Man Challenge"	None	4–3	Beach Blast; June 20, 1992, Mobile, Alabama	Mobile Civic Center
2	Dustin Rhodes drew with Rick Rude (30:00) "Iron Man Challenge"	Vacant WCW United States Heavyweight Championship	1–1	Beach Blast; July 18, 1993, Biloxi, Mississippi	Mississippi Coast Coliseum

==== Participant list ====
Wrestler	Victories	Appearances
Ricky Steamboat	1	1
Dustin Rhodes	0	1
Rick Rude	0	2
