= Denis Gauthier =

Canadian ice hockey player

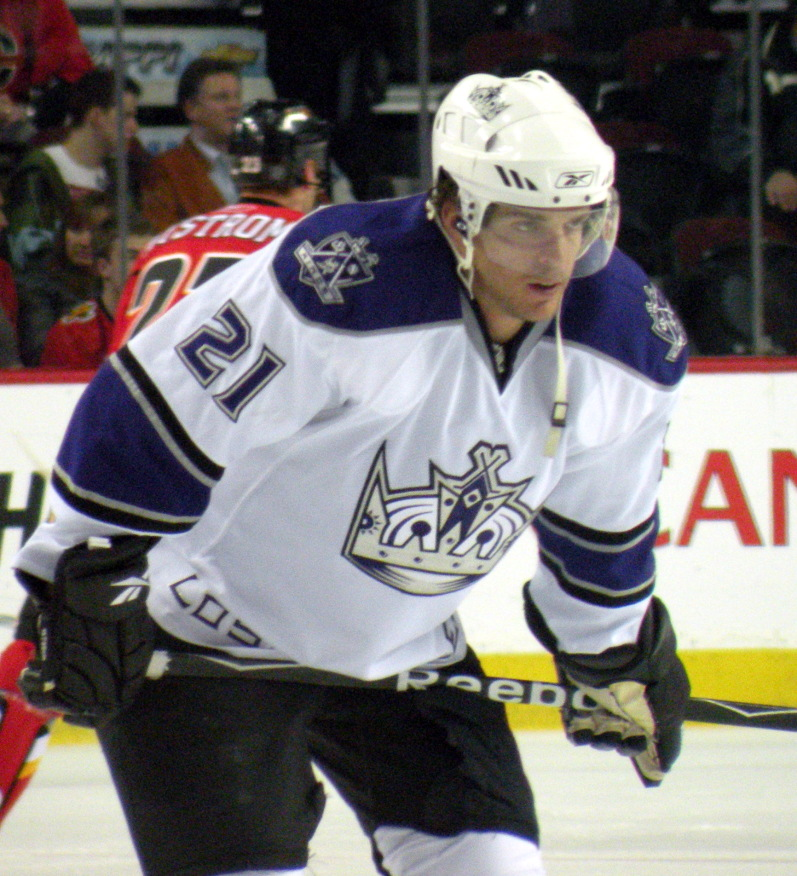
- Born: October 1, 1976 (age 50) Montreal, Quebec, Canada
- Height: 6 ft 3 in (191 cm)
- Weight: 225 lb (102 kg; 16 st 1 lb)
- Position: Defence
- Shot: Left
- Played for: Calgary Flames; Phoenix Coyotes; Philadelphia Flyers; Los Angeles Kings
- NHL draft: 20th overall, 1995; Calgary Flames
- Playing career: 1996–2009

Denis Gauthier, Jr. (born October 1, 1976) is a Canadian former professional ice hockey defenceman. A first round selection of the Calgary Flames at the 1995 NHL entry draft, Gauthier played for the Flames, Phoenix Coyotes, Philadelphia Flyers and Los Angeles Kings during his ten-season National Hockey League (NHL) career.

== Playing career ==
Gauthier played four seasons of major-junior hockey with the Drummondville Voltigeurs of the Quebec Major Junior Hockey League. He holds the franchise record for most goals by a defenceman in one season, 25, and had his number 21 retired by the Voltigeurs in 2009.

Drafted by the Calgary Flames with the 20th overall pick in the first round of the 1995 NHL Entry Draft, he made his NHL debut in 1997. A physical, defensively oriented player, he was known for delivering open-ice body checks.

He played only the first round of the Flames' 2004 playoff run after suffering a knee injury in Game 6 against the Vancouver Canucks. He later underwent surgery on his anterior cruciate ligament on May 21.

In the 2004 off-season, he was traded to the Phoenix Coyotes in a deal also involving Daymond Langkow and Oleg Saprykin. During the 2006 trade deadline, Gauthier was traded to the Philadelphia Flyers for Josh Gratton and two second-round draft picks. Prior to the 2007–08 season, Gauthier was waived by the Flyers and was assigned to the Philadelphia Phantoms. He spent the entire season with the Phantoms, and following the season was waived again on June 30, 2008. The following day, he was traded along with a 2010 second-round draft pick to the Los Angeles Kings for Patrik Hersley and Ned Lukacevic.

On February 2, 2009, Gauthier was suspended for five games for a high elbow head shot to Montreal Canadiens defenseman Josh Gorges. On February 21, 2009, Gauthier was suspended for two games for boarding on an icing call to San Jose Sharks captain Patrick Marleau.

== Awards ==
QMJHL:

- Emile Bouchard Trophy, 1995–96
- First Team All-Star, 1995–96

=== Canadian Hockey League ===
- First Team All-Star, 1995–96

=== IIHF World Junior Championship ===
- Gold medal, 1995–96

== Personal life ==
Gauthier's father, Denis Sr., was a professional wrestler, and his mother Joanne is the sister of former wrestlers Jacques, Armand and Raymond Rougeau. His nephew Julien Gauthier was drafted by the Carolina Hurricanes. He is also the father of Ethan Gauthier who played for the Sherbrooke Phoenix in the QMJHL and got drafted 37th overall by the Tampa Bay Lightning in 2023.

== Career statistics ==
=== Regular season and playoffs ===
			Regular season					Playoffs
Season	Team	League	GP	G	A	Pts	PIM	GP	G	A	Pts	PIM
1992–93	Drummondville Voltigeurs	QMJHL	61	1	7	8	136	10	0	5	5	40
1993–94	Drummondville Voltigeurs	QMJHL	60	0	7	7	176	9	2	0	2	41
1994–95	Drummondville Voltigeurs	QMJHL	64	9	31	40	190	4	0	5	5	12
1995–96	Drummondville Voltigeurs	QMJHL	53	25	49	74	140	6	4	4	8	32
1995–96	Saint John Flames	AHL	5	2	0	2	8	16	1	6	7	20
1996–97	Saint John Flames	AHL	73	3	28	31	74	5	0	0	0	6
1997–98	Calgary Flames	NHL	10	0	0	0	16	—	—	—	—	—
1997–98	Saint John Flames	AHL	68	4	20	24	154	21	0	4	4	83
1998–99	Calgary Flames	NHL	55	3	4	7	68	—	—	—	—	—
1998–99	Saint John Flames	AHL	16	0	3	3	31	—	—	—	—	—
1999–00	Calgary Flames	NHL	39	1	1	2	50	—	—	—	—	—
2000–01	Calgary Flames	NHL	62	2	6	8	78	—	—	—	—	—
2001–02	Calgary Flames	NHL	66	5	8	13	91	—	—	—	—	—
2002–03	Calgary Flames	NHL	72	1	11	12	99	—	—	—	—	—
2003–04	Calgary Flames	NHL	80	1	15	16	113	6	0	1	1	4
2005–06	Phoenix Coyotes	NHL	45	2	9	11	61	—	—	—	—	—
2005–06	Philadelphia Flyers	NHL	17	0	0	0	37	6	0	1	1	19
2006–07	Philadelphia Flyers	NHL	43	0	4	4	45	—	—	—	—	—
2007–08	Philadelphia Phantoms	AHL	78	3	15	18	80	11	0	1	1	17
2008–09	Los Angeles Kings	NHL	65	2	2	4	90	—	—	—	—	—
AHL totals			240	12	66	78	347	53	1	11	12	126
NHL totals			554	17	60	77	748	12	0	2	2	23

=== International ===
Year	Team	Event	GP	G	A	Pts	PIM
1996	Canada	WJC	6	1	1	2	6
Junior totals			6	1	1	2	6

== See also ==
Rougeau wrestling family

Preceded by Chris Dingman	Calgary Flames' first-round draft pick 1995	Succeeded by Derek Morris
