= Marc Blondin =

French-Canadian wrestling commentator and promoter

Personal information
- Born: Quebec, Canada

Professional wrestling career
- Debut: 1986

Marc Blondin is a French Canadian professional wrestling commentator, ring announcer and promoter. He started his wrestling career in 1986 for the World Wrestling Federation and worked there until 1991. Blondin was also the main French language announcer for World Championship Wrestling, most notably for WCW Power Hour with Richard Charland, as well as the World Wrestling Federation in Quebec, Canada throughout the 1990s. Since 2004, he has co-hosted the French-language version of TNA Impact! with Pierre Carl Ouellet and Sylvain Grenier at RDS studios. He later became part owner of Top of the World Wrestling (TOW)with Grenier and fellow RDS announcer Jean-François Kelly. He also does English Color Commentary for the DVD releases alongside Ryan Rider who does the Play-by-Play.

== Career ==
Marc Blondin was working in event management and as a radio DJ in Quebec when he got his start in the wrestling business with the WWF in 1986, when Guy Hauray, then in charge of French-language business for the WWF, hired him for ring announcer duties for house shows in Montreal. Later that year he replaced Edouard Carpentier as the official French-language interviewer in the WWF. He also replaced Carpentier as on-air commentator in 1989 when Carpentier was briefly suspended. He left WWF at the end of 1991.

In 1991, Blondin headed the French language announce team for WCW Power Hour and other WCW programming in Quebec, Canada with former wrestler Richard Charland. Blondin worked full-time for WCW broadcasts. That was eventually stopped in late 1993 and he returned to his event management business. In 1996, he was rehired at the recommendation of Jacques Rougeau when WCW was looking for French-speaking announcers for a new TV contract signed with Canal+ in France and Belgium. He brought in good friend Michel Letourneur as co-host because Letourneur could speak with a European French accent since they were working exclusively for Europe at first. Together, they hosted Monday Nitro and select PPV's (on tape delay) for 3 years. In 1999/2000, the contract with Canal+ was not renewed, however WCW programming had also resumed in Quebec in 1998 so they were kept around. In 2000, they started announcing PPVs live on Canal Indigo in Quebec. In 2001, they hosted a seven-week-long marathon of WCW pay-per-view events from Starrcade 1999 to Bash At The Beach 2000. It was around this time that Vince McMahon and the WWF purchased the bankrupt WCW and it was announced that the show would be cancelled since they could no longer broadcast shows from either promotion.

Following the end of WCW Blondin continued to be involved in Canadian wrestling in Quebec and Eastern Canada. In 2001, Blondin made several appearances for Jacques Rougeau, Jr.'s Lutte International 2000. During its June 1 show at the Auditorium de Verdun, Blondin addressed the 3,500 crowd with Jacques Rougeau's son Cedric opening for the professional debut 12-year-old Jean Jacques Rougeau, another of Jacques' sons, against midget wrestler Little Broken. The previous month, he had appeared at a press conference with the Jacques Rougeau, Sr. and the rest of the Rougeau family to promote the event and gave a speech on the Rougeau's contributions to Canadian professional wrestling.

In 2004 Blondin became the French language announcer for TNA Impact! with Pierre-Carl Ouellette at the RDS studios, later joined by Sylvain Grenier and Jean-François Kelly. On May 14, 2005, Blondin appeared at Northern Championship Wrestling's ChallengeMania 13 as the Captain Buffet the cornerman of Chris Stevens in his match and helped Stevens get the victory.

In the fall of 2007 Ouellette left TNA Impact! and Grenier was brought in to replace him as Blondin's co-host. While Ouellette was wrestling oversees, Blondin and Grenier continually insulted the former color commentator and referred to him as a "jobber" on air. Grenier eventually began to pick on Blondin as well triggering a 3-way kayfabe feud. This culminated in a wrestling match between Ouellette and Grenier when the former returned from England. When Ouellette and Grenier faced each other in Hawkesbury, Ontario on June 21, 2008, Blondin served as the special guest referee. He and Grenier had posted numerous interviews on YouTube prior to the event. On May 12, 2007, he and PCO with Jean-françois Kelly started Top of the World Wrestling (TOW) in Montreal. The promotion brought in many former World Wrestling Entertainment wrestlers to the region during its first year in operation as well as showcasing many younger Quebec wrestlers and still run to today in 2014.

In March 2009, TOW suffered a setback with a show headlined by American wrestler Samoa Joe. When the American wrestler cancelled on the day of the show, Blondin brought in Matt Morgan to replace him. On September 25, 2009, Blondin and TOW held a tribute show for Pat Patterson which was attended by Morgan, The Honky Tonk Man, Simon Dean and La Résistance (Sylvain Grenier & Rob Conway). It was the first time Grenier and Conway had teamed together since leaving WWE in 2007. In front of over a thousand fans at Centre Pierre-Charbonneau, Blondin read a letter in the ring to Patterson celebrating his career and legacy in Canadian wrestling. The letter reportedly made Patterson's "eyes wet" during the presentation.

In 2012, Marc Blondin helmed his 1000th wrestling show on French television. TOW 10 was a deception for him during that year as a promoter. After mostly running spot shows with TOW, He and his TOW team put together 4 television pilots for RDS2 and they aired every Sunday of December 2013 after being recorded on September 28.

In 2020, he returned to Impact Wrestling and has been hosting their major shows in French live ever since on Fite TV along with Handsome JF.

In 2021, he started his own podcast, SYMM: Soyez-Y, Mesdames, Messieurs (Be there, Ladies and Gentlemen), named after one of his most famous catchphrases. It is available on all platforms and YouTube. He talks all subjects on wrestling, interviews people from the industry and tells stories from his career.

On September 22 2022, he promoted the Symmania fanfest in Mirabel, QC.

In 2023, he released his autobiography Soyez-Y, Mesdames, Messieurs: La Grand Histoire de ma Petite Vie.

== Job titles ==
- World Championship Wrestling French language commentator
- World Wrestling Federation French language commentator
- Total Non-Stop Action French language commentator
