= Canadian International Heavyweight Championship =

Professional wrestling championship

International Heavyweight Championship

Details
- Promotion: Lutte Internationale (1976–1987); Total Nonstop Action Wrestling (2024–2025); Independent (2025–present)
- Date established: March 29, 1976
- Current champion: PCO

Other names
- Canadian World Championship; Canadian International Heavyweight Championship (1976–1987; 2024–2025)
Statistics
- First champion: Serge Dumont
- Most reigns: Dino Bravo (7 reigns)
- Longest reign: Dino Bravo (398 days)
- Shortest reign: A. J. Francis (35 days)
- Oldest champion: PCO (56 years old)
- Youngest champion: The Great Samu (23 years old)

The International Heavyweight Championship is a professional wrestling championship that was most recently promoted by the American wrestling promotion Total Nonstop Action Wrestling (TNA).

It was originally the top singles title in the Montreal-based wrestling promotion Lutte Internationale (International Wrestling). It was the successor to the Montreal Athletic Commission's MAC World Heavyweight Championship (later renamed the International Heavyweight Championship), which was retired after the Commission's promotion, the International Wrestling Association, closed in 1975. The title was promoted from 1976 until Lutte Internationale closed in 1987, upon which the title was retired.

In 2024, the title was revived by TNA by A. J. Francis, with the explanation that Francis purchased the rights to the title and declared himself champion. This occurred on June 15, 2024 in Cicero, Illinois during the Impact! tapings which aired on June 27. At The People vs. GCW show, PCO cut a promo in which he legitimately aired his grievances with TNA management, before attempting to destroy the TNA Digital Media Championship belt with a sledgehammer. After that, Digital Media Championship was vacated and the Canadian International Heavyweight Championship was subsequently dropped.

In 2025, it was announced that PCO would defend the title against Dan Maff in a House of Pain match at the Maple Leaf Pro Wrestling event Resurrection, with Billy Gunn as special guest referee.

== Title history ==
Key
No.	Overall reign number
Reign	Reign number for the specific champion
Days	Number of days held

No.	Champion	Championship change			Reign statistics		Notes	Ref.
No.	Champion	Date	Event	Location	Reign	Days	Notes	Ref.
Lutte Internationale
1	Serge Dumont	March 29, 1976	IW show	Montreal, Quebec, Canada	1	127	Defeated Johnny Rougeau.	
2	Billy Two Rivers	August 3, 1976	IW show	Montreal, Quebec, Canada	1	160		
3	Serge Dumont	September 1976	IW show	N/A	2	N/A		
4	Johnny Rougeau	September 1976	IW show	N/A	1	N/A		
Championship history is unrecorded from September 1976 to February 1980.
5	Edouard Carpentier	1980	IW show	N/A	1	N/A	Unknown who Carpentier defeated for the title.	
6	Java Ruuk	February 11, 1980	IW show	Montreal, Quebec, Canada	1	189		
7	Edouard Carpentier	August 18, 1980	IW show	N/A	2	40		
8	Pierre Lefebvre	September 27, 1980	IW show	N/A	1	3		
9	Dino Bravo	September 30, 1980	IW show	N/A	1	107	Unknown who Bravo defeated for the title.	
10	Michel Dubois	January 12, 1981	IW show	N/A	1	159		
11	Dino Bravo	June 20, 1981	IW show	Ottawa, Ontario, Canada	2	N/A		
12	Sailor White	January 1982	IW show	N/A	1	N/A		
13	Dino Bravo	July 1982	IW show	N/A	3	N/A		
—	Vacated	July 1982	—	N/A	—	—		
14	Billy Robinson	August 16, 1982	IW show	Montreal, Quebec, Canada	1	147	Defeated Rick Martel in tournament final.	
15	The Destroyer	January 10, 1983	IW show	Montreal, Quebec, Canada	1	2		
16	Billy Robinson	January 12, 1983	IW show	Quebec City, Quebec, Canada	2	54		
17	Dino Bravo	March 7, 1983	IW show	Montreal, Quebec, Canada	4	N/A		
18	Rick Martel	June 1983	IW show	N/A	1	N/A		
19	Dino Bravo	September 21, 1983	IW show	Montreal, Quebec, Canada	5	384		
20	King Tonga	October 9, 1984	IW show	Hull, Quebec, Canada	1	125		
21	Dino Bravo	February 11, 1985	IW show	Montreal, Quebec, Canada	6	91	Special referee—Verne Gagne.	
—	Vacated	May 13, 1985	—	N/A	—	—		
22	Dino Bravo	May 28, 1985	IW show	Montreal, Quebec, Canada	7	398	Defeated King Tonga; recognized by the WWF during their takeover of the Montreal office.	
23	The Great Samu	June 30, 1986	IW show	Montreal, Quebec, Canada	1	126		
24	David Schultz	November 3, 1986	IW show	Montreal, Quebec, Canada	1	77		
25	Hercules Ayala	January 19, 1987	IW show	Montreal, Quebec, Canada	1	27		
26	Abdullah the Butcher	February 15, 1987	IW show	Montreal, Quebec, Canada	1	197		
—	Deactivated	August 31, 1987	—	N/A	—	—	Title retired upon the closing of Lutte Internationale.	
Total Nonstop Action Wrestling (TNA)
27	A. J. Francis	June 15, 2024	Impact!	Cicero, Illinois, United States	1	35	Title revived by Total Nonstop Action Wrestling (TNA) with the explanation that Francis bought the rights to the title and declared himself as champion. This episode aired on tape delay on June 27, 2024.	
28	PCO	July 20, 2024	Slammiversary	Montreal, Quebec, Canada	1	346+	This was a Montreal Street Fight. This was also for Francis' TNA Digital Media Championship. Title dropped by TNA after PCO's appearance at Game Changer Wrestling; PCO retained possession of title.	
Independent

== See also ==
- List of former championships in Total Nonstop Action Wrestling
