= Jean Rougeau =

Canadian professional wrestler (1929 – 1983)

Personal information
- Born: June 9, 1929 Montreal, Quebec, Canada
- Died: May 25, 1983 (aged 53) Montreal, Quebec, Canada
- Family: Rougeau

Professional wrestling career
- Ring name: Johnny Rougeau
- Billed height: 6 ft 2 in (188 cm)
- Billed weight: 225 lb (102 kg)
- Billed from: Montreal, Quebec
- Trained by: Eddie Auger; Yvon Robert
- Debut: 1951
- Retired: 1982

Jean Rougeau (June 9, 1929 – May 25, 1983) was a professional wrestler better known as Johnny Rougeau. Rougeau started wrestling in 1951 as Johnny Rougeau after an amateur wrestling career. In 1956, he was joined by his brother, Jacques Rougeau, Sr. He is also the uncle to former wrestlers Jacques Rougeau and Raymond Rougeau who would go on to great fame in the World Wrestling Federation as the Fabulous Rougeau Brothers as well as Armand Rougeau whose full-time career was cut short by injury. He had feuds with Abdullah the Butcher, The Sheik, Ivan Koloff, Hans Schmidt and Killer Kowalski. He founded All-Star Wrestling in 1967.

== Amateur wrestling ==
Rougeau began his amateur wrestling career in 1943.

== Professional wrestling career ==
Rougeau was also one of the premier promoters in Quebec. In the late 60s, Rougeau gave Ivan Koloff his ring name. He mainly worked in Montreal but wrestled in Ohio, Ottawa, Texas, Detroit, Toronto, New York, Minnesota and Florida.

== Ice hockey ==
Rougeau also coached ice hockey with the Rosemont National 70-71 and Laval National 71–72, 72–73, 77–78 in the Quebec Major Junior Hockey League, which included New York Islander Mike Bossy. He later served as the league's president from 1981 to 1983. The Jean Rougeau Trophy was named in his honor and is awarded to the team that records the most points in the regular season.

== Personal life ==
He was also at times a bodyguard, nightclub owner, and politician. Most notably, Rougeau became the bodyguard and chauffeur of then-Liberal candidate René Lévesque during the 1960 election after he was personally threatened by Union Nationale partisans.

In 1982, he was awarded the Bene Merenti de Patria, a silver medal awarded by the Saint-Jean-Baptiste Society every year to a native of Quebec who has demonstrated service to the homeland.

He died of cancer on May 25, 1983. His funeral was attended by about 7,000 people. He was buried at the Notre Dame des Neiges Cemetery in Montreal.

== Championships ==
- All-Star Wrestling
  - All-Star Wrestling Heavyweight Champion (2 times)
- Fédération Française de Catch Professionnel
  - World Heavyweight Championship (French version) (1 time)
- International Wrestling Association (Montreal)
  - IWA International Heavyweight Championship (6 times)
- Montreal Athletic Commission
  - MAC World Heavyweight Championship (1 time)
- Wrestling Observer Newsletter
  - Wrestling Observer Newsletter Hall of Fame (2024)

== See also ==
- Rougeau wrestling family
