= Rougeau wrestling family =

Canadian professional wrestling family

The Rougeau wrestling family is a family of French Canadian professional wrestlers, with the first Rougeau member taking up wrestling in the 1940s. So far four generations of the family have been involved in professional wrestling starting with Eddie Auger, followed into the sport by his nephews Johnny and Jacques Rougeau Sr. in the 1950s. Three of Jacques' sons following him into professional wrestling Jacques Jr., Raymond, and Armand. Jacques ' eldest daughter, Joanne Rougeau, worked as a wrestling promoter for the World Wrestling Federation from 1995 to 2000. Jean-Jacques and Cedric, both sons of Jacques Rougeau Jr., represent the fourth generation.

== Members ==
First generation

- Edouard Auger (1923 – December 1973) – Professional wrestler, worked under the ring name Ed Auger, Eddie Auger, Henri LaSalle, Pierre LaSalle.

Second generation

- Jean Rougeau (June 9, 1929 – May 25, 1983) – wrestler, worked under the ring names Jean Rougeau, Johnny Rougeau.
- Jacques Rougeau Sr. (born 1930 – July 1, 2019) – Retired wrestler, worked under the ring name Jacques Rougeau.

Third generation

- Raymond Rougeau (February 18, 1955–) – Retired wrestler, worked under the ring names Raymond Rougeau and Ray Rougeau.
- Jacques Rougeau Jr. (June 13, 1960–) – Retired wrestler, worked under the ring names Jacques Rougeau, Jerry Roberts, The Mountie, Freedom Fighter, Jacques, Jimmy Rougeau.
- Armand Rougeau (December 30, 1961–) – Retired wrestler, worked under the ring names Armand Lefebvre, Armand Rougeau and Phillip Rougeau.

Fourth generation

- Jean-Jacques Rougeau (1989) – Professional wrestler, son of Jacques Rougeau Jr., works under the ring name Jean-Jacques "JJ" Rougeau.
- Cedric Rougeau (February 22, 1993) son of Jacques Rougeau Jr, works under the ring name of Cedric Rougeau and "Predateur" (a heel gimmick)
- Emile Rougeau (2000) – son of Jacques Rougeau Jr., works under the ring name Emile Rougeau.

Other

- Denis Gauthier, Denis Gauthier Sr. (date of birth August 16, 1943) – Retired professional wrestler, brother-in-law of Jacques Jr., Raymond and Armand Rougeau. worked under the ring name Denis Gauthier.

== Family history in professional wrestling ==
The Rougeau family first got involved in professional wrestling when Eddie Auger began wrestling around 1946. Auger worked under a number of different names: Ed Auger, Eddie Auger, Henri LaSalle and Pierre LaSalle. Together with Jack O'Brien he held the Georgia version of the NWA World Tag Team Championship and alongside Maurice Vachon he held the NWA Texas Tag Team Championship, both in the 1950s. Auger's nephew through marriage, Jean Rougeau, became a professional wrestler under the ring name "Johnny Rougeau" in 1951. Johnny Rougeau wrestled primarily in Canada. Jean Rougeau was soon joined by his brother Jacques Rougeau who turned pro in 1956. Jacques' three sons followed in his footsteps, Raymond Rougeau in 1971, Jacques Rougeau Jr. in 1977 and Armand Rougeau in 1982. Armand retired in 1987 due to injuries. Jacques Jr. and Raymond competed as a tag team in the World Wrestling Federation (WWF) from 1986 until 1990 as the Fabulous Rougeau Brothers. Raymond Rougeau retired in 1990 and became a host for French-produced WWF programming. Ray Rougeau would also be often used as interviewer for the WWF wrestlers through the mid-90s. His sister, Joanne Rougeau, joined him in WWF as a promoter for Eastern Canada mid to end of 90s.

Jacques was planning retiring as well during the mid-1990s, as his partner from The Quebecers tag-team Pierre turned on him at a house show held on the Montreal Forum. During this house show as well, Ray Rougeau would leave the broadcasting team and run to the ring to save his brother. This angle led to Rougeau's first retirement match, which, over the next few months, was heavily promoted on WWF TV shows broadcast in the Montreal area, as well as in the local media. The match, which was held on October 21, 1994, drew a sell-out crowd of 16,843 to the Montreal Forum, and resulted in a victory for Rougeau, when he pinned Ouellet following a seated tombstone piledriver. Rougeau, who was accompanied by Raymond, used Queen's song "We Are the Champions" as his theme music for the night.

Ray Rougeau came out of retirement on August 8, 1996, to face Owen Hart in a boxing match at the Montreal Molson Centre during a WWF house show despite not being active as a competitor for years, but a successful wrestler on the Montreal area.

Jacques' daughter Joanne promoted wrestling shows in Canada and is a bodybuilder. She was once a marketing specialist for the World Wrestling Federation. She was married to wrestler Denis Gauthier, Sr. They have a son, Denis Jr., who plays for the Los Angeles Kings of the National Hockey League. Remarried in 1989 has three more children, a son Shane and twin daughters who became Canadian Blackbelts in TKD in 2005. There is also a second daughter, Diane, who lives in Florida.

In 2018, Jacques Rougeau, Jr. announced that he would retire for a third time, and that he had closed his wrestling school. On August 18, 2018, Rougeau teamed with his sons for the first and only time, mirroring his father's retirement match. As Rougeau's sons have no interest in pursuing professional wrestling, this is likely the final chapter in the history of the Rougeau wrestling family.

== Family tree ==
Albina Auger	Armand Rougeau
Jean "Johnny" Rougeau	Jacques Rougeau Sr.
Raymond Rougeau	Jacques Rougeau	Nancy Ménard	Armand Rougeau	Joanne Rougeau	Denis Gauthier, Sr	Diane Rougeau
Jean-Jacques Rougeau	Cedric Rougeau	Emile Rougeau	Denis Gauthier Jr.

== Championship and accomplishments ==
As a family

- Canadian Wrestling Hall of Fame
  - Class of 2001

Individual

- Jean Rougeau
  - Championships and accomplishments
- Jacques Rougeau Sr.
  - Championships and accomplishments
- Jacques Rougeau
  - Championships and accomplishments
- Raymond Rougeau
  - Championships and accomplishments
- Armand Rougeau
  - Championships and accomplishments

== See also ==
- The Fabulous Rougeaus
- The Quebecers
- Hart wrestling family
