= Bobby Managoff =

American professional wrestler

Personal information
- Born: Robert Manoogian Jr. January 4, 1918 Chicago, Illinois, U.S.
- Died: April 3, 2002 (aged 84) Chicago, Illinois, U.S.

Professional wrestling career
- Billed height: 6 ft 0 in (183 cm)
- Billed weight: 235 lb (107 kg)
- Trained by: Bob Managoff Sr.
- Debut: 1936
- Retired: 1966

Robert Manoogian Jr. (January 4, 1918 – April 3, 2002) was an American professional wrestler of Armenian descent who was best known for his work with National Wrestling Alliance in the 1940s as Bobby Managoff.

== Professional wrestling career ==
Managoff was trained by his father Robert Manoogian Sr., a professional wrestler billed as "Bob Monograph", who had a match with Frank Gotch in 1916 where Gotch's leg was broken. Bobby started wrestling in 1936 at the age of 18. He started his career in what is now National Wrestling Alliance. He won the Texas Heavyweight Championship in February 1942. On February 17, he lost the title to Juan Humberto in Dallas, Texas. In June 1942, he signed with National Wrestling Association, a subsidiary of National Boxing Association which was to sanction professional wrestling.

He defeated Yvon Robert on November 27, 1942 in Houston, Texas to win the NWA World Heavyweight Championship. He traveled in several cities of United States and defended his NWA Championship. He lost the title to "Wild" Bill Longson on February 19, 1943 in St. Louis, Missouri.

In 1944, he left National Wrestling Association and started wrestling around Texas. He formed a tag team with Otto Kuss. They both won the Texas Tag Team Championship in May 1945. They dropped the titles to Hans Schnable and Marvin Jones on May 14 in Galveston, Texas. In 1945, he won his second Texas Heavyweight Championship. He dropped the title to Dale Levin on July 13 in Houston. Afterward, he began feuding with "Nature Boy" Buddy Rogers.

In the late 1940s, he started traveling around Hawaii. On November 9, 1949, he defeated Jack Claybourne in Honolulu to win the NWA Hawaii Heavyweight Championship. Dean Detton defeated him for the title on December 11. Managoff started feuding with Whipper Billy Watson between 1950 and 1953. On July 19, 1953, he defeated Hans Schnabel to win his second Hawaii title. He lost it to Ben Sharpe on August 23, 1953. He began a stint in Montreal where he won the Montreal World Heavyweight Championship on five occasions. In 1966, he retired from professional wrestling.

== Personal life ==
Managoff attended Tuley High School in Illinois. His older sister was Kay Armen (1915 - 2011), a singer/actress on stage, film, radio, and TV. He was married to a woman named Eve.

On April 3, 2002, he died of heart failure in Chicago, Illinois at age 84.

== Championships and accomplishments ==
- 50th State Big Time Wrestling
  - NWA Hawaii Heavyweight Championship (1 time)
- American Wrestling Association
  - Nebraska Heavyweight Championship ( 2 times )
- George Tragos/Lou Thesz Professional Wrestling Hall of Fame
  - Class of 2000
- Montreal Athletic Commission
  - World Heavyweight Championship (Montreal version) (5 times)
- National Wrestling Association
  - NWA World Heavyweight Championship (1 time)
- Professional Wrestling Hall of Fame and Museum
  - Class of 2020
- Southwest Sports, Inc.
  - Texas Heavyweight Championship (1 time)^{1} ^{2}
  - Texas Tag Team Championship (1 time)^{2} - with Otto Kuss

^{1}Records are unclear as to whom he defeated for both of his title reigns.
^{2}His reign with the title occurred before the NWA took control of the championship and took place before the NWA was created.
