= MAC World Heavyweight Championship =

Professional wrestling championship

Details
- Promotion: Montreal Athletic Commission (Sanctioning body); AWA (1935 – 1938); CAP (1939 – 1963); IWA / ASW (1964 – 1975)
- Date established: 1935
- Date retired: 1975
Statistics
- First champion: Danno O'Mahoney
- Final champion: Jacques Rougeau
- Most reigns: Yvon Robert (15 times)
- Longest reign: Édouard Carpentier (974 days)
- Shortest reign: Gino Garibaldi (only reign, seven days); Antonino Rocca (only reign, seven days); Yvon Robert (fifteenth reign, seven days); Lou Thesz (fifth reign, seven days)

The MAC World / International Heavyweight Championship was a Canadian professional wrestling championship created and sanctioned by the Montreal Athletic Commission (MAC). While the Commission sanctioned the title, it did not promote the events in which the Championship was defended. From 1935 until 1938, the American Wrestling Association (AWA) controlled the Championship. The AWA World Heavyweight Championship was recognized by the MAC as the world championship until February 1938 when Yvon Robert was stripped of the title after refusing to wrestle Lou Thesz. A separate world title was created specifically for Quebec and, after the Commission granted promoter Eddie Quinn control of the championship, was used as the main singles title for Canadian Athletic Promotions from 1939 to 1963 and finally by the International Wrestling Association / All-Star Wrestling from 1964 until the mid-1970s. In 1975 the championship was abandoned and replaced by the Canadian International Heavyweight Championship.

== Title history ==
=== Names ===
Name	Years
AWA World Heavyweight Championship	1935 – 1938
MAC World Heavyweight Championship	1938 – 1954
MAC International Heavyweight Championship	1954 – 1964
IWA International Heavyweight Championship	1964 – 1976

=== Reigns ===
Key
No.	Overall reign number
Reign	Reign number for the specific champion
Days	Number of days held
N/A	Unknown information
(NLT)	Championship change took place "no later than" the date listed
†	Championship change is unrecognized by the promotion
+	Current reign is changing daily

No.	Champion	Championship change			Reign statistics		Notes	Ref.
No.	Champion	Date	Event	Location	Reign	Days	Notes	Ref.
1	Danno O'Mahoney	July 30, 1935	Live event	Boston, Massachusetts	1	352	Recognized as world champion in Quebec after defeating Ed Don George to unify the AWA, NWA and NYSAC World Heavyweight Championships. Although O'Mahoney is defeated by Dick Shikat for the unified title in New York City on March 2, 1936, he is still recognized as world champion by the Montreal Athletic Commission on July 3, 1936.	
2	Yvon Robert	July 16, 1936	Live event	Montreal, Quebec	1	595	Yvon Robert is stripped of the AWA World Heavyweight Championship in February 1938 after refusing to defend the title against Lou Thesz. He is still recognized as world champion in Montreal and a separate championship is created as a result.	
3	Vic Christy	March 3, 1938	Live event	Toronto, Ontario	1	64	Awarded via forfeit when Robert suffered a shoulder injury during the match	
†	Don McIntyre	May 6, 1938	Live event	Buffalo, New York	1	7	Reign was not recognized by the Montreal Athletic Commission	
†	Vic Christy	May 13, 1938	Live event	Buffalo, New York	2	27	Reign was not recognized by the Montreal Athletic Commission	
4	The Masked Marvel	June 9, 1938	Live event	Toronto, Ontario	1	97	This was a Best 2-out-of-3 Falls match	
5	Yvon Robert	September 14, 1938	Live event	Montreal, Quebec	2	96	The Masked Marvel refuses to unmask after the match and the Montreal Athletic Commission withholds his purse. The masked wrestler continues to be recognized as world champion in Ontario, however, this short-lived offshoot of the Montreal title was abandoned in January 1939.	
†	Cy Williams	November 28, 1938	Live event	Montreal, Quebec	1	N/A	The decision is overturned by the Montreal Athletic Commission and the title is returned to Robert.	
†	Yvon Robert	November 1938	N/A	N/A	3	N/A		
6	Cy Williams	December 19, 1938	Live event	Montreal, Quebec	1	235		
—	Vacated	August 11, 1939	—	—	—	—	Championship vacated when Cy Williams is stripped of the title after refusing to put up a bond to defend the belt	
7	Ernie Dusek	August 11, 1939	N/A	N/A	1	53	Awarded title by the Montreal Athletic Commission after defeating Danno O'Mahoney in a tournament final in Montreal on August 8, 1939.	
8	Yvon Robert	October 3, 1939	Live event	Montreal, Quebec	3	147	This was a Best 2-out-of-3 Falls match. Also defeated Cy Williams in Montreal on October 31, 1939, ending his claim to the title.	
9	Joe Cox	February 27, 1940	Live event	Montreal, Quebec	1	83		
10	Leo Numa	May 20, 1940	Live event	Montreal, Quebec	1	23	Numa was not recognized as champion by the Montreal Athletic Commission until May 28, 1940, claiming that the Quebec City commission did not consult with the MAC over its decision.	
11	Lou Thesz	June 12, 1940	Live event	Montreal, Quebec	1	133	This was a Best 2-out-of-3 Falls match	
12	Yvon Robert	October 23, 1940	Live event	Montreal, Quebec	4	266	This was a Best 2-out-of-3 Falls match	
13	Lou Thesz	July 16, 1941	Live event	Montreal, Quebec	2	63	This was a Best 2-out-of-3 Falls match	
14	Yvon Robert	September 17, 1941	Live event	Montreal, Quebec	5	336		
15	Bill Longson	August 19, 1942	Live event	Montreal, Quebec	1	49	This was a Best 2-out-of-3 Falls unification match in which Longson also defended the NWA World Heavyweight Championship	
15	Yvon Robert	October 7, 1942	Live event	Montreal, Quebec	6	190	This was a Best 2-out-of-3 Falls match. Robert regains the MAC title, however, the AWA and NWA initially refused to recognize Robert as champion due to the controversial finish in the third fall. Robert lost the NWA title to Bobby Managoff in Houston, Texas on November 27, 1942.	
16	John Katan	April 15, 1943	Live event	Montreal, Quebec	1	13		
17	Yvon Robert	April 28, 1943	Live event	Montreal, Quebec	6	14		
18	Gino Garibaldi	May 12, 1943	Live event	Montreal, Quebec	1	7		
19	Bobby Managoff	May 19, 1943	Live event	Montreal, Quebec	1	119		
20	Yvon Robert	September 15, 1943	Live event	Montreal, Quebec	7	189		
21	Sandor Szabo	March 22, 1944	Live event	Boston, Massachusetts	1	84	This was a Best 2-out-of-3 Falls match. Szabo was officially recognized as champion by the Montreal Athletic Commission on May 9, 1944.	
22	Yvon Robert	June 14, 1944	Live event	Montreal, Quebec	8	35	This was a Best 2-out-of-3 Falls match	
23	Frank Sexton	July 19, 1944	Live event	Montreal, Quebec	1	35	This was a Best 2-out-of-3 Falls match	
24	Yvon Robert	August 23, 1944	Live event	Montreal, Quebec	9	70	This was a Best 2-out-of-3 Falls match	
25	Gino Garibaldi	November 1, 1944	Live event	Montreal, Quebec	1	22	Awarded via forfeit when Robert suffered a knee injury during the match	
26	Yvon Robert	November 23, 1944	Live event	Montreal, Quebec	10	223		
27	Joe Savoldi	July 4, 1945	Live event	Montreal, Quebec	1	70		
28	Bobby Managoff	September 12, 1945	Live event	Montreal, Quebec	2	364		
29	Lou Thesz	September 11, 1946	Live event	Montreal, Quebec	3	162		
30	Bobby Managoff	February 20, 1947	Live event	Ottawa, Ontario	3	55		
31	Lou Thesz	April 16, 1947	Live event	Montreal, Quebec	4	224		
32	Yvon Robert	November 26, 1947	Live event	Montreal, Quebec	11	512		
33	Whipper Billy Watson	April 21, 1949	Live event	Ottawa, Ontario	1	62		
34	Yvon Robert	June 22, 1949	Live event	Montreal, Quebec	12	224		
35	Bobby Managoff	February 1, 1950	Live event	Montreal, Quebec	4	14		
36	Yukon Eric	February 15, 1950	Live event	Montreal, Quebec	1	266		
37	Bobby Managoff	November 8, 1950	Live event	Montreal, Quebec	5	182		
38	Buddy Rogers	May 9, 1951	Live event	Montreal, Quebec	1	65		
39	Yvon Robert	July 13, 1951	Live event	Montreal, Quebec	13	185		
—	Vacated	January 14, 1952	—	—	—	—	Championship vacated when Robert undergoes kidney surgery	
40	Killer Kowalski	April 2, 1952	Live event	Montreal, Quebec	1	329	Defeated Bobby Managoff in a tournament final	
41	Verne Gagne	February 25, 1953	Live event	Montreal, Quebec	1	70		
42	Killer Kowalski	May 6, 1953	Live event	Montreal, Quebec	2	70		
43	Yvon Robert	July 15, 1953	Live event	Montreal, Quebec	14	35	This was a Best 2-out-of-3 Falls match	
44	Killer Kowalski	August 19, 1953	Live event	Montreal, Quebec	3	266		
†	Don Leo Jonathan	November 24, 1953	Live event	Ottawa, Ontario	1	8	Reign was not recognized by the Montreal Athletic Commission	
†	Killer Kowalski	December 2, 1953	Live event	Montreal, Quebec	4	161	Reign was not recognized by the Montreal Athletic Commission	
46	Antonino Rocca	May 12, 1954	Live event	Montreal, Quebec	1	7		
47	Killer Kowalski	May 19, 1954	Live event	Montreal, Quebec	4	63	This was a Best 2-out-of-3 Falls match. Awarded via forfeit when Rocca cannot continue after losing the second fall to even the match at one fall each.	
48	Pat O'Connor	July 21, 1954	Live event	Montreal, Quebec	1	112		
49	Killer Kowalski	November 10, 1954	Live event	Montreal, Quebec	5	119	The title may have been renamed the MAC International Heavyweight Championship.	
50	Pat O'Connor	March 9, 1955	Live event	Montreal, Quebec	2	91		
51	Don Leo Jonathan	June 8, 1955	Live event	Montreal, Quebec	1	65		
52	Yvon Robert	August 17, 1955	Live event	Montreal, Quebec	15	7	This was a Best 2-out-of-3 Falls match	
53	Don Leo Jonathan	August 24, 1955	Live event	Montreal, Quebec	2	112		
54	Killer Kowalski	December 14, 1955	Live event	Montreal, Quebec	6	91		
55	Wilbur Snyder	March 14, 1956	Live event	Montreal, Quebec	7	21		
56	Killer Kowalski	April 4, 1956	Live event	Montreal, Quebec	7	9		
57	Yvon Robert	April 13, 1956	Live event	Quebec City, Quebec	16	47		
58	Killer Kowalski	May 30, 1956	Live event	Montreal, Quebec	8	343		
59	Édouard Carpentier	August 15, 1956	Live event	Montreal, Quebec	1	42		
60	Killer Kowalski	September 26, 1956	Live event	Montreal, Quebec	9	35		
61	Lou Thesz	October 31, 1956	Live event	Montreal, Quebec	5	7		
62	Killer Kowalski	November 7, 1956	Live event	Montreal, Quebec	10	182		
63	Édouard Carpentier	May 8, 1957	Live event	Montreal, Quebec	2	35	This was a Best 2-out-of-3 Falls match	
64	Gene Kiniski	June 12, 1957	Live event	Montreal, Quebec	1	35	This was a Best 2-out-of-3 Falls match	
65	Killer Kowalski	July 17, 1957	Live event	Montreal, Quebec	11	791	This was a Best 2-out-of-3 Falls match with Mike Mazurki as the guest referee	
66	Buddy Rogers	September 16, 1959	Live event	Montreal, Quebec	2	77		
67	Killer Kowalski	December 2, 1959	Live event	Montreal, Quebec	12	42	This was a Best 2-out-of-3 Falls match	
68	Buddy Rogers	January 13, 1960	Live event	Montreal, Quebec	3	147	This was a Best 2-out-of-3 Falls match	
69	Killer Kowalski	June 8, 1960	Live event	Montreal, Quebec	13	105		
70	Édouard Carpentier	September 21, 1960	Live event	Montreal, Quebec	3	302		
71	Hans Schmidt	July 20, 1961	Live event	Montreal, Quebec	1	110		
72	Johnny Rougeau	November 7, 1961	Live event	Ottawa, Ontario	1	258		
73	Killer Kowalski	July 23, 1962	Live event	Montreal, Quebec	14	191		
74	Édouard Carpentier	January 30, 1963	Live event	Montreal, Quebec	4	974	The title was renamed the IWA International Heavyweight Championship after Johnny Rougeau and Bob Langevin took over the International Wrestling Association on May 6, 1965.	
—	Vacated	September 30, 1965	—	—	—	—	Championship vacated when Carpentier is stripped of the title by the Montreal Athletic Commission after not having defended it in over a year.	
75	Hans Schmidt	September 30, 1965	Live event	Montreal, Quebec	2	49	Defeated Sailor Art Thomas in a tournament final	
76	Johnny Rougeau	November 18, 1965	Live event	Montreal, Quebec	2	N/A		
77	Hans Schmidt	June, 1966 (n)	Live event	Unknown	3	N/A		
78	Édouard Carpentier	June 7, 1966	Live event	Quebec City, Quebec	5	30		
79	Hans Schmidt	July 7, 1966	Live event	Chicoutimi, Quebec	4	88		
80	Édouard Carpentier	October 3, 1966	Live event	Montreal, Quebec	6	44		
81	Hans Schmidt	November 16, 1966	Live event	Quebec City, Quebec	5	69		
82	Mad Dog Vachon	January 24, 1967	Live event	Chicoutimi, Quebec	1	132		
83	Johnny Rougeau	June 5, 1967	Live event	Montreal, Quebec	3	70		
84	Mad Dog Vachon	August 14, 1967	Live event	Montreal, Quebec	2	10		
—	Vacated	August 24, 1967	—	—	—	—	Championship vacated after Vachon is injured in a car accident	
85	The Sheik	October 23, 1967	Live event	Montreal, Quebec	1	14	Defeated Gino Brito in a tournament final.	
86	Édouard Carpentier	November 6, 1967	Live event	Montreal, Quebec	7	21		
87	Baron Von Raschke	November 27, 1967	Live event	Montreal, Quebec	1	70		
88	Johnny Rougeau	February 5, 1968	Live event	Montreal, Quebec	4	473		
89	Ivan Koloff	May 23, 1969	Live event	Quebec City, Quebec	2	52		
90	Abdullah the Butcher	July 14, 1969	Live event	Montreal, Quebec	1	28		
91	Jacques Rougeau	August 11, 1969	Live event	Montreal, Quebec	1	105		
92	Abdullah the Butcher	November 24, 1969	Live event	Montreal, Quebec	2	126		
93	Johnny Rougeau	March 30, 1970	Live event	Montreal, Quebec	5	203		
94	Danny Lynch	October 19, 1970	Live event	Montreal, Quebec	1	49		
95	Johnny Rougeau	December 7, 1970	Live event	Montreal, Quebec	6	140		
96	Jos LeDuc	April 26, 1971	Live event	Montreal, Quebec	1	56		
97	Mr. X / Tarzan Zorra	June 21, 1971	Live event	Montreal, Quebec	1	70		
98	Abdullah the Butcher	August 30, 1971	Live event	Montreal, Quebec	3	119		
99	Carlos Rocha	December 27, 1971	Live event	Montreal, Quebec	1	140		
100	The Sheik	May 15, 1972	Live event	Montreal, Quebec	2	63		
101	Jacques Rougeau	July 17, 1972	Live event	Montreal, Quebec	2	133		
102	Johnny Valentine	November 27, 1972	Live event	Montreal, Quebec	1	42		
—	Vacated	January 8, 1973	—	—	—	—	Championship vacated when Johnny Valentine is stripped of the title after failing to appear for a scheduled title defence	
103	Jacques Rougeau	January 8, 1973	Live event	Montreal, Quebec	3	35	Awarded title after Valentine fails to appear for their rematch.	
—	Vacated	February 12, 1973	Live event	Montreal, Quebec	—	—	Championship vacated after a match between Rougeau and Waldo Von Erich ends in a no-contest.	
104	Jacques Rougeau	February 19, 1973	Live event	Montreal, Quebec	4	119	Defeated Waldo Von Erich	
105	Dick Taylor	June 18, 1973	Live event	Montreal, Quebec	1	42		
106	Jacques Rougeau	July 30, 1973	Live event	Montreal, Quebec	4	N/A	Awarded title after Taylor fails to appear for their rematch.	
107	Michel Dubois	1973	Live event	Unknown	1	N/A		
108	The Sheik	December 3, 1973	Live event	Unknown	3	N/A	This was a Best 2-out-of-3 Falls match.	
—	Vacated	July 1974	—	—	—	—	Championship vacated when The Sheik was stripped of the title by the Montreal Athletic Commission for "violent behavior".	
109	Tiger Jeet Singh	1974	Live event	Unknown	1	N/A	Won in a tournament final	
110	Jacques Rougeau	1974	Live event	Unknown	5	N/A		
—	Deactivated	1975	—	—	—	—	All-Star Wrestling closed in the spring of 1975, and the title was replaced by the Canadian International Heavyweight Championship.	
