= Fabulous Rougeaus =

Professional wrestling tag team

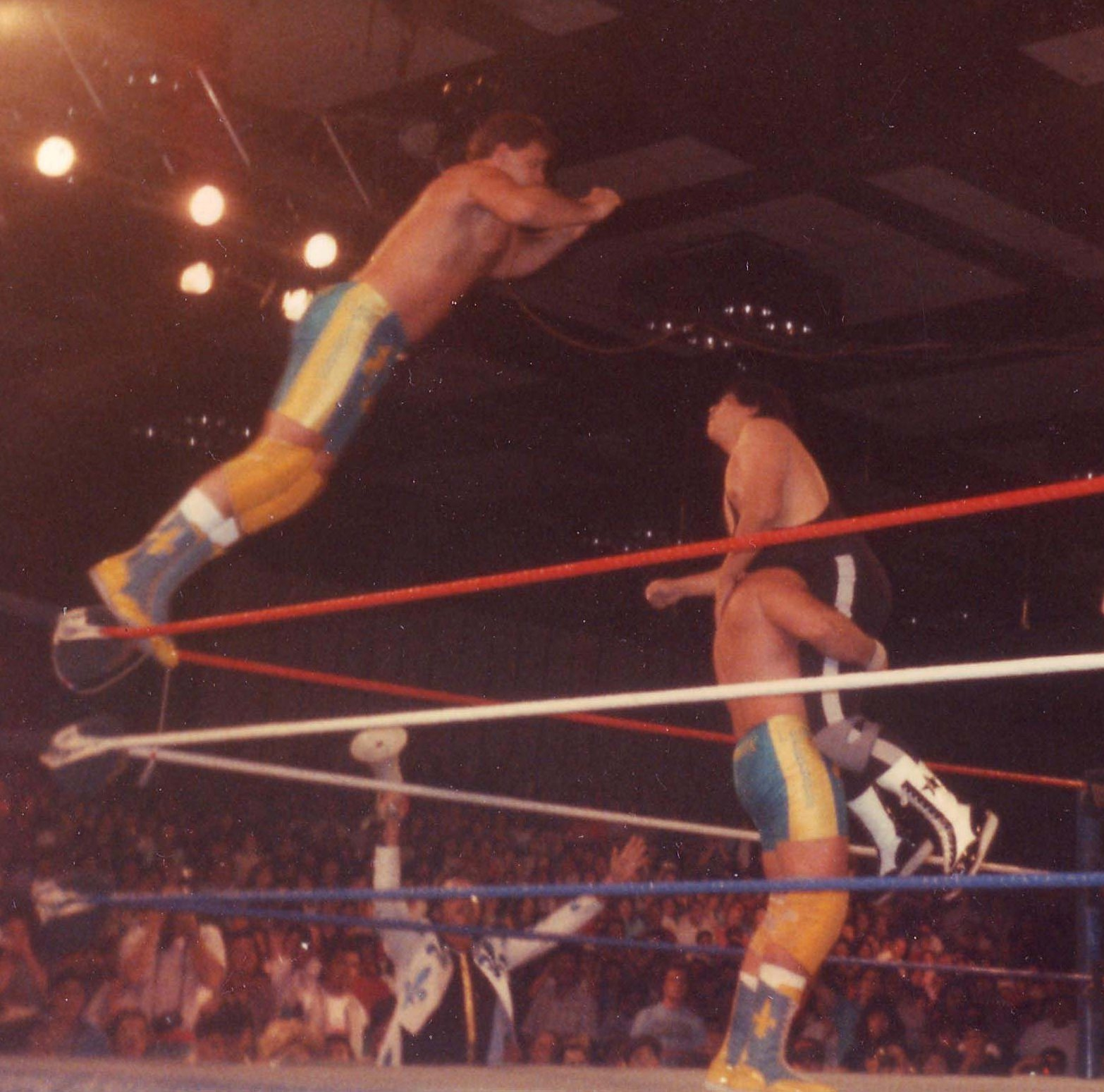
- The Rougeau Brothers executing La Bombe de Rougeau, March 1989

Tag team
- Members: Jacques Rougeau; Raymond Rougeau
- Name(s): Rougeau Brothers (Late 1970s–1988); Fabulous Rougeau Brothers (1988–1990); Fabulous Rougeaus (1988-1990)
- Billed heights: 6 ft 1 in (1.85 m) - Jacques; 5 ft 9 in (1.75 m) - Raymond
- Combined billed weight: 213 kg (470 lb; 33.5 st)
- Hometown: Montreal, Quebec
- Billed from: Montreal, Quebec, but soon to relocate to the United States (Memphis, Tennessee)
- Debut: Late 1970s
- Disbanded: 1990
- Trained by: Jacques Rougeau Sr.

The Fabulous Rougeaus (also known as the Fabulous Rougeau Brothers) was the professional wrestling tag team of real-life brothers Jacques and Raymond Rougeau, best known from their time in the World Wrestling Federation (WWF), from 1986 to 1990. During part of this time, they were managed by Jimmy Hart.

== History ==
Jacques and Raymond began tag-teaming in the late 1970s in their family's Montreal-based wrestling promotion. They later became major stars in Lutte Internationale. Their most notable feud in Montreal was against the Garvin brothers, Ron Garvin and Jimmy Garvin (who were not actually brothers); the climax of their feud was a match in front of close to 20,000 fans at the Montreal Forum.

They were signed to World Wrestling Federation (WWF) contracts in February 1986, and debuted as clean-cut faces, The Rougeau Brothers. The Rougeaus were often matched against heel teams such as The Dream Team and Demolition. The latter team coined the nickname the "Ragú sisters" for the brothers - this would later be revived after the Rougeaus' eventual heel turn by such face opponents as The Rockers, The Bushwhackers and Demolition who had made their own (face) turn.

The Rougeaus actually won the WWF Tag Team Championship on August 10, 1987, at the Forum, in a house show, defeating The Hart Foundation. Jimmy Hart, the Hart Foundation's manager, tried to interfere on their behalf with his signature foreign object, a megaphone. The megaphone was intercepted by the Rougeaus, who used it to get the pin and win the titles. They were announced as the new tag team champions, but the decision was later reversed and their title win was never recognized by the WWF.

Nearly a year after this event, the Rougeaus made a gradual turn to heel. An early indication of this came during a televised match against The Killer Bees, which aired during July 1988. Both teams went into the match as babyfaces, but the Rougeaus won the match by cheating. After the match, fans booed when the Rougeaus offered to shake hands with the Bees, who refused. Also during this period of time, old rivals the Hart Foundation had turned babyface and dumped "The Mouth of the South" Jimmy Hart as their manager. Jimmy became manager of the Rougeaus to solidify their heel turn and to solidify The Hart Foundation's babyface turn. This was also done in part because the Rougeau Brothers were not getting over with fans, and Vince McMahon felt they might be more successful as heels.

The Rougeaus began calling themselves The Fabulous Rougeau Brothers and feuded with the Hart Foundation during the fall of 1988 into early 1989, with the storyline being that Jimmy Hart still had a contract with the Hart Foundation, and was subsequently giving his percentage of the Foundation's earnings to the Rougeaus as a bonus. The Rougeaus developed a facetiously pro-American gimmick, billing themselves as "soon to relocate to Memphis, Tennessee" and using the theme song "All-American Boys". The theme song, an upbeat rock number sung by the Rougeaus themselves, would further rile the fans by claiming their affinity for "whitebread" things like "preppy" hairstyles and Barry Manilow's music. The bridge of the song (in French) admits they are aware the fans despise them, slyly confirming that their ingratiating demeanor is phony and done to mock the fans. To draw even more heat, they would wave comically small American flags and try to start a "U.S.A." chant just to annoy the crowd. The Rougeaus had a real-life altercation with Tom Billington (the Dynamite Kid from The British Bulldogs) backstage in 1988. "Mr. Perfect" Curt Hennig had framed the Bulldogs in a prank at the Rougeaus' expense, leading to the Dynamite Kid (upset about being incorrectly blamed) slapping Jacques from behind in the locker room in Miami and repeatedly punching him in the face. Tension between Dynamite and the Rougeaus mounted for more than a week until Jacques punched him in the mouth with a roll of quarters in hand before the next TV tapings in Fort Wayne, Ind., causing Dynamite to lose four teeth. After the attack, Billington harbored a grudge against the Rougeaus, and it was feared Dynamite might try to get revenge after their 10-team, 20-man elimination match at the Survivor Series 1988 PPV (which was his final match in the WWF). The match had the Rougeaus, Demolition, Brain Busters, The Bolsheviks, and Los Conquistadores vs. The British Bulldogs, The Rockers, The Hart Foundation, The Young Stallions, and The Powers of Pain. For fear of the Dynamite Kid taking his revenge, the match was booked so the Rougeaus were the first team eliminated, with Bret Hart pinning Raymond in the bout's opening minutes with a small package. The Bulldogs were kept in the match until they were one of the final four teams remaining. By the time the Bulldogs had been eliminated and made their way back to the locker room, the Rougeaus had already been rushed out of the building. During the actual match, Dynamite worked with the Rougeaus without incident.

The Rougeaus' next big feud was against The Rockers in 1989. The feud began when the Rockers debuted a new theme song for themselves with them singing (this new theme was soon dropped, however). The Rougeaus claimed that the Rockers were "copycats," and hit Shawn Michaels in the throat with Jimmy Hart's megaphone. The teams feuded over the summer of 1989, producing many excellent, raved-about matches. At SummerSlam 89, the Rougeaus teamed with fellow Canadian Rick Martel, defeating the Rockers and Martel's former Strike Force tag-team partner Tito Santana in a six-man tag team match. After their initial feuds against the face teams of the era, the Rougeaus quickly devolved into a comedy tag team, often coming out on the short end against The Bushwhackers.

Raymond, who suffered from chronic back pain for years, retired in 1990 and moved behind the microphone; briefly as an interviewer for English-language WWF broadcasts, then as host of their French-language TV shows. He came out of retirement in 1996 to face Owen Hart in a boxing match at the Forum and now occasionally wrestles in Jacques' Montréal-area promotion, Lutte International 2000.

Jacques disappeared from the WWF for nearly a year, but was re-branded as The Mountie upon his return in 1991, and went on to singles success with Jimmy Hart staying on as his manager. The Mountie was a corrupt member of the Royal Canadian Mounted Police (RCMP) who would often boast that he "always gets his man" in the ring. Rougeau's greatest singles success as The Mountie was when he won the WWF Intercontinental championship from Bret Hart in January 1992. He would only hold the title for two days however, losing it to Rowdy Roddy Piper at the Royal Rumble.

The Mountie gimmick caused some controversy in Canada with the real RCMP, with litigation forcing Rougeau to use his real life name when wrestling in his home country, though he did continue to wrestle in his Mountie inspired boots, black pants and red shirt. Despite being a heel in the WWF, Rougeau, like a lot of other Canadian wrestlers, was cheered in Canada, especially in his home province of Quebec. At one time during his singles run, Rougeau wrestled a match with WWF Champion Hulk Hogan where the babyface Hogan (who was the WWF's most popular star at the time) was actually booed by the crowd and Rougeau was the fan favorite, despite he and Jimmy Hart doing what they could to get heat from the crowd in attendance.

He then began teaming up with Carl Ouellet to win the World Tag Team Championship three times as The Quebecers. He briefly retired, reunited with Ouellet as The Amazing French Canadians in World Championship Wrestling (WCW), and appeared sporadically in the WWF and WCW before retiring from full-time competition. He occasionally wrestles for his own promotion.

On March 30, 1998, they reunited with Pierre as they defeated a young Edge, Shawn Stasiak and Tom Brandi in a 6-tag in a dark match for WWF Shotgun Saturday Night.

== Championships and accomplishments ==
- Lutte Internationale
  - Canadian International Tag Team Championship (4 times)

== See also ==
- The Quebecers
- Rougeau wrestling family
