= Jacques Rougeau Sr. =

Canadian professional wrestler (1930–2019)

Jacques Rougeau

Personal information
- Born: May 27, 1930 Montreal, Quebec, Canada
- Died: July 1, 2019 (aged 89) Montreal, Quebec, Canada
- Family: Rougeau

Professional wrestling career
- Billed height: 6 ft 3 in (191 cm)
- Billed weight: 250 lb (113 kg)
- Billed from: Montreal, Quebec
- Trained by: Eddie Auger
- Debut: 1956
- Retired: 1986

Jacques Rougeau Sr. (May 27, 1930 – July 1, 2019) was a Canadian professional wrestler. He was the father of wrestlers Jacques Rougeau, Armand Rougeau and Raymond Rougeau.

== Career ==
Rougeau started wrestling in 1956 with his brother, Johnny Rougeau. He had feuds with Abdullah the Butcher, Alexis Smirnoff, Don Leo Jonathan and The Sheik.

In 1984, Rougeau came out of semi-retirement to fight a series of matches in Quebec. Teaming with his three sons, Jacques, Armand and Raymond, the Rougeaus fought against many heels in the area, such as Pierre 'Mad Dog' Lefebvre, Frenchy Martin, Sailor White and Tarzan Tyler.

Rougeau retired in 1986.

== Championships and accomplishments ==
- International Wrestling Association (Montreal)
  - IWA International Heavyweight Championship (5 times)
  - IWA International Tag Team Championship (1 time) – with Gino Brito
- National Wrestling Federation
  - NWF Heavyweight Championship (1 time)
  - NWF World Tag Team Championship (1 time) – with Johnny Powers

== See also ==
- Rougeau wrestling family
