= Pierre Lefebvre =

French-Canadian wrestler (1955 – 1985)

- Lefebvre as champion

Personal information
- Born: February 24, 1955 Charlemagne, Quebec, Canada
- Died: December 24, 1985 (aged 30) Quebec City, Quebec, Canada

Professional wrestling career
- Ring name: Mad Dog
- Billed height: 5 ft 10 in (1.78 m)
- Billed weight: 233 lb (106 kg)
- Debut: 1972

Pierre Lefebvre (February 24, 1955 – December 24, 1985) was a French-Canadian professional wrestler better known by his ring name Mad Dog Pierre Lefebvre.

== Professional Wrestling career ==
He started his career at the age of 17 in 1972 in Montreal. In 1973, he quit wrestling and became a welder for two years. In 1975 he returned to wrestling. By 1976, Raymond Rougeau was in Atlanta working for Jim Barnette, and he would correspond with Lefebvre. Lefebvre would wrestle in Atlanta for GCW (Georgia Championship Wrestling) until 1979. In 1979 he wrestled for the Pacific Northwest National Wrestling Alliance affiliate.

In 1980 he returned to Montreal for Varoussac International wrestling. He became very successful winning the International Heavyweight title. He won the Canadian International Tag Team titles seven times with Michel Dubois, Pat Patterson, Billy Robinson, and Frenchy Martin. He feuded with the likes of the Rougeaus, Gino Brito, Tony Parisi, and Dino Bravo. He then went to Japan in 1984. After that he started appearing for the World Wrestling Federation. He wrestled Akira Maeda for the WWF International Heavyweight Championship in a tournament final, where he lost. He made most appearances at WWF in house shows that were in Canada in 1985.

He was called "Mad Dog' because of his look a like to Mad Dog Vachon.

== Death ==
Lefebvre, Tarzan Tyler, and referee Adrien Desbois were on their way home from the matches at Centre Georges-Vezina in Chicoutimi on the evening of December 24, 1985 when they were in a terrible car accident. Their Ford Escort rammed a tow truck at 1:25 a.m. on an icy Route 175 in the Parc des Laurentides. All three men were killed; the driver of the tow truck was unharmed. The news quickly made the rounds, especially with the tragedy coming so close to Christmas. They died around the Laurentides Wildlife Reserve.

== Championships and accomplishments ==
- Lutte Internationale
  - Canadian International Heavyweight Championship (1 time)
  - Canadian International Tag Team Championship (7 times) - with Michel Dubois, Pat Patterson (2), Billy Robinson and Frenchy Martin
- World Wrestling Council
  - WWC North American Heavyweight Championship (1 time)

== See also ==
- List of premature professional wrestling deaths
