= Armand Rougeau =

Canadian former professional wrestler (born 1961)

Personal information
- Born: December 30, 1961 (age 64) Sainte-Anne-de-Bellevue, Quebec, Canada
- Family: Rougeau

Professional wrestling career
- Ring name: Armand Rougeau
- Billed height: 6 ft 2 in (1.88 m)
- Billed weight: 225 lb (102 kg)
- Billed from: Montreal, Quebec, Canada
- Trained by: Jacques Rougeau, Sr. Raymond Rougeau
- Debut: 1982
- Retired: 1987

Armand Rougeau (born December 30, 1961) is a Canadian former professional wrestler. He is the son of Jacques Rougeau, Sr. and brother of former World Wrestling Federation (WWF) wrestlers Jacques Rougeau, Jr. and Raymond Rougeau. He performed in Canada before he was hired by the WWF. An injury forced him out of the ring for several years. He has wrestled occasional matches and worked as an auto mechanic since retiring from wrestling.

== Career ==
Rougeau started wrestling in his native Canada in 1982. In 1983, while wrestling in the Montreal area, he formed a tag team with Dan Kroffat known as the Flying Canucks. They feuded with The Long Riders (Scott and Bill Irwin). They also had a rivalry with Richard Charland over Lutte Internationale's Canadian International Tag Team Championship. On February 8, 1987, Rougeau and Kroffat defeated Charland and Sheik Ali to win the title belts. They held the championship for over two months, dropping it to Charland and Chuck Simms on April 13. During his time with the company, Rougeau also competed as a singles wrestler, facing such opponents as Bob Orton, Jr.

He signed a contract to compete for the World Wrestling Federation (WWF) in 1986. One month before his WWF debut, he sustained a serious back injury. To repair the injury, he had two discs removed from his back, which forced him to retire. He operated an auto repair business after leaving wrestling. He did not wrestle for several years, until he agreed to wrestle in a tag team match for his brother Jacques's Lutte 2000 promotion in December 2001. He has come back for several matches since then but does not intend to return to wrestling on a regular basis.

== Championships and accomplishments ==
- Lutte Internationale
  - Canadian International Tag Team Championship (1 time) - with Dan Kroffat

== See also ==
- Rougeau wrestling family
