= PCO (wrestler) =

Canadian professional wrestler (born 1967)

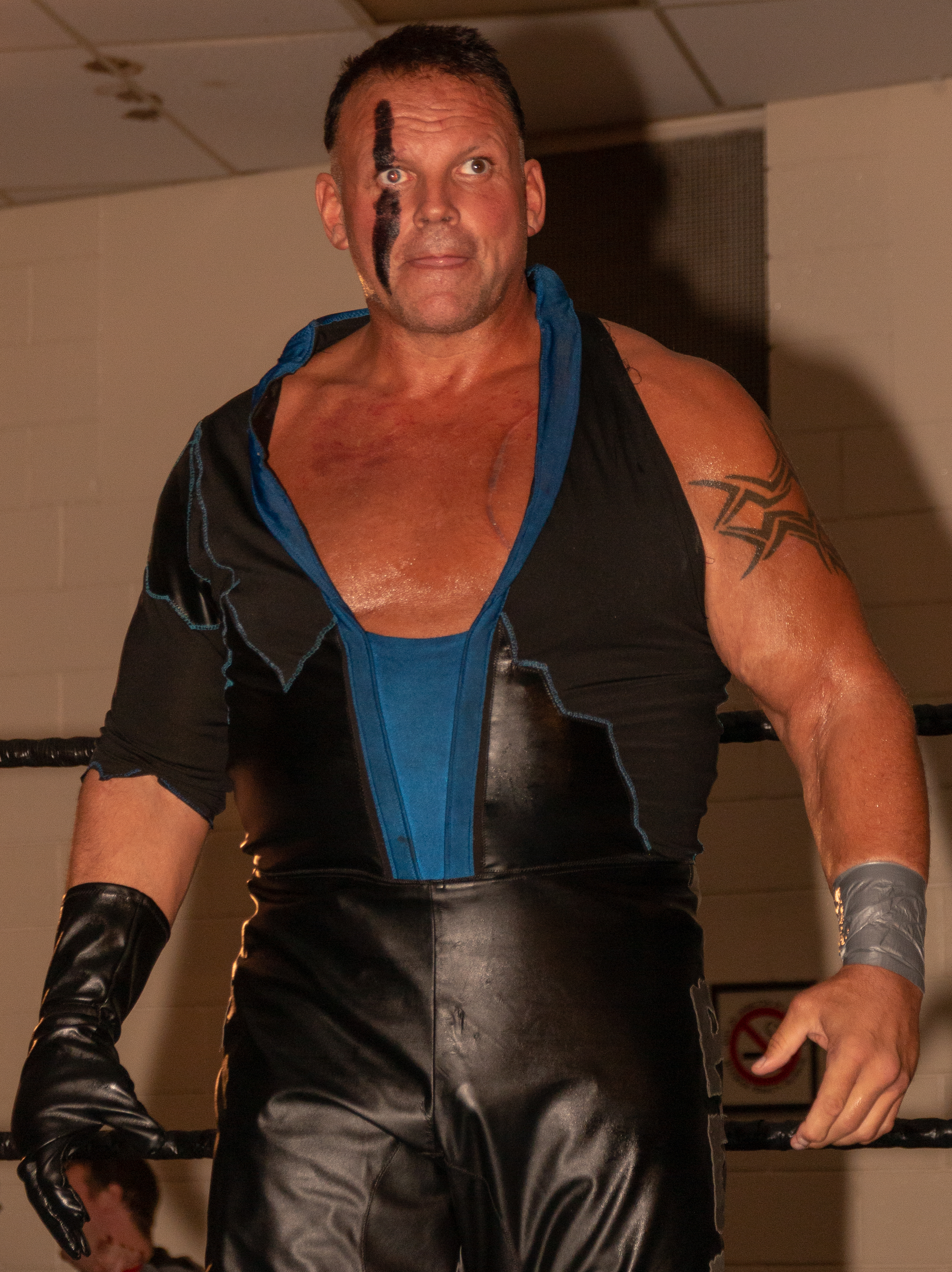
- PCO in 2018

Personal information
- Born: Carl Ouellet; December 30, 1967 (age 58) Sainte-Catherine, Quebec, Canada
- Children: 1

Professional wrestling career
- Ring name(s): Bash the Terminator; Carl Ouellet; Jean-Pierre LaFitte; Killer Karl Wallace; Kris Kannonball; PCO; Perfect Creation One; Pierre; Pierre Carl Ouellet; Pierre Ouellet; The Pirate; Quebecer Pierre; Super Bee #1; Wal Wallace; Wild Carl Wallace; X
- Billed height: 6 ft 1 in (185 cm)
- Billed weight: 300 lb (136 kg)
- Billed from: Baton Rouge, Louisiana, U.S. (as Jean-Pierre LaFitte); Montreal, Quebec, Canada
- Trained by: Édouard Carpentier; Pat Girard; Dan Kroffat; Steve Strong
- Debut: 1987

Carl Ouellet (born December 30, 1967) is a Canadian professional wrestler better known by his ring name PCO. He is known for his appearances with the World Wrestling Federation (as Pierre and Jean-Pierre LaFitte) and with World Championship Wrestling (under his real name) during the 1990s. Throughout the 1990s, he regularly teamed with Jacques Rougeau as the Quebecers and the Amazing French Canadians, winning the WWF Tag Team Championship on three occasions. After retiring in 2011, Ouellet returned to the ring in 2016, undergoing a career renaissance with the gimmick of PCO: "part beast-turned-man, part old-time strongman". From 2018 to 2021, Ouellet wrestled for Ring of Honor (ROH), where he was a ROH World Champion, ROH World Tag Team Champion, and ROH World Six-Man Tag Team Champion. He joined TNA in 2022, winning the TNA Digital Media Championship before departing at the end of 2024.

== Professional wrestling career ==
=== Early career (1987–1993) ===
Carl Ouellet debuted in 1987 on the independent circuit. In the late-1980s, he wrestled for Atlantic Grand Prix Wrestling as "Super Bee #1", teaming with Super Bee #2 as the "Super Bees". In 1991, he wrestled for All Star Wrestling in the United Kingdom as "Wild Carl Wallace". In 1992, he wrestled for the International Championship Wrestling Alliance in Florida as "Bash the Terminator", teaming with Crash the Terminator as "the Terminators". From October to December 1992, Ouellet (again as Wild Carl Wallace) wrestled for the Catch Wrestling Association in Germany. He also regularly appeared on New Catch on Eurosport (filmed in France), teaming with Brick Crawford as Double Trouble. From January 1993 to April 1993, he wrestled for Capitol Sports Promotions in Puerto Rico as "Killer Karl Wallace". In May 1993, Ouellet (as "Bash the Terminator") wrestled in Japan with W*ING as part of its Danger Road tour.

While working in Puerto Rico, Ouellet was offered a try-out with the World Wrestling Federation, and he signed with the promotion later that year.

=== World Wrestling Federation (1993–1995) ===
==== Quebecer Pierre (1993–1995) ====
In July 1993, Ouellet debuted in the World Wrestling Federation as the tag team partner of Jacques Rougeau. As one half of The Quebecers, Ouellet adopted the name "Pierre" and dressed like Mounties. This was a reference to Jacques's previous gimmick, The Mountie, which had been banned in Canada due to concern that the heelish character of The Mountie would lead to children mistrusting legitimate Mounties. The Quebecers sang their own entrance theme, in which they stated that, contrary to appearances, "We're not the Mounties". Later in the year they were joined by manager, Johnny Polo.

The Quebecers held the WWF Tag Team Championship on three occasions. On September 13, 1993, they defeated the Steiner Brothers for the tag titles (under "Province of Quebec Rules", which provided for titles changing hands on disqualifications). They were defeated by 1-2-3 Kid and Marty Jannetty on January 10, 1994, and again by Men on a Mission on March 29 (during a tour of England) but each time regained the titles within days. They lost the belts a third and final time to The Headshrinkers on the May 2 episode of Monday Night Raw in Burlington, Vermont. After the Quebecers lost to the Headshrinkers at a house show in July 1994, Pierre attacked Jacques, breaking up the team.

Pierre began wrestling singles matches, primarily at house shows and in dark matches. Pierre defeated Intercontinental Champion Razor Ramon by count out on October 2, 1994, at a house show in Cornwall, Ontario. On October 21, 1994, the former partners wrestled one another in Rougeau's retirement match in Montreal, main-eventing a sold-out Montreal Forum. During the rest of 1994 and early 1995, Pierre continued to work in dark matches and house shows wrestling against Bob Holly, Aldo Montoya and Shawn Michaels.

==== Jean-Pierre LaFitte (1995) ====
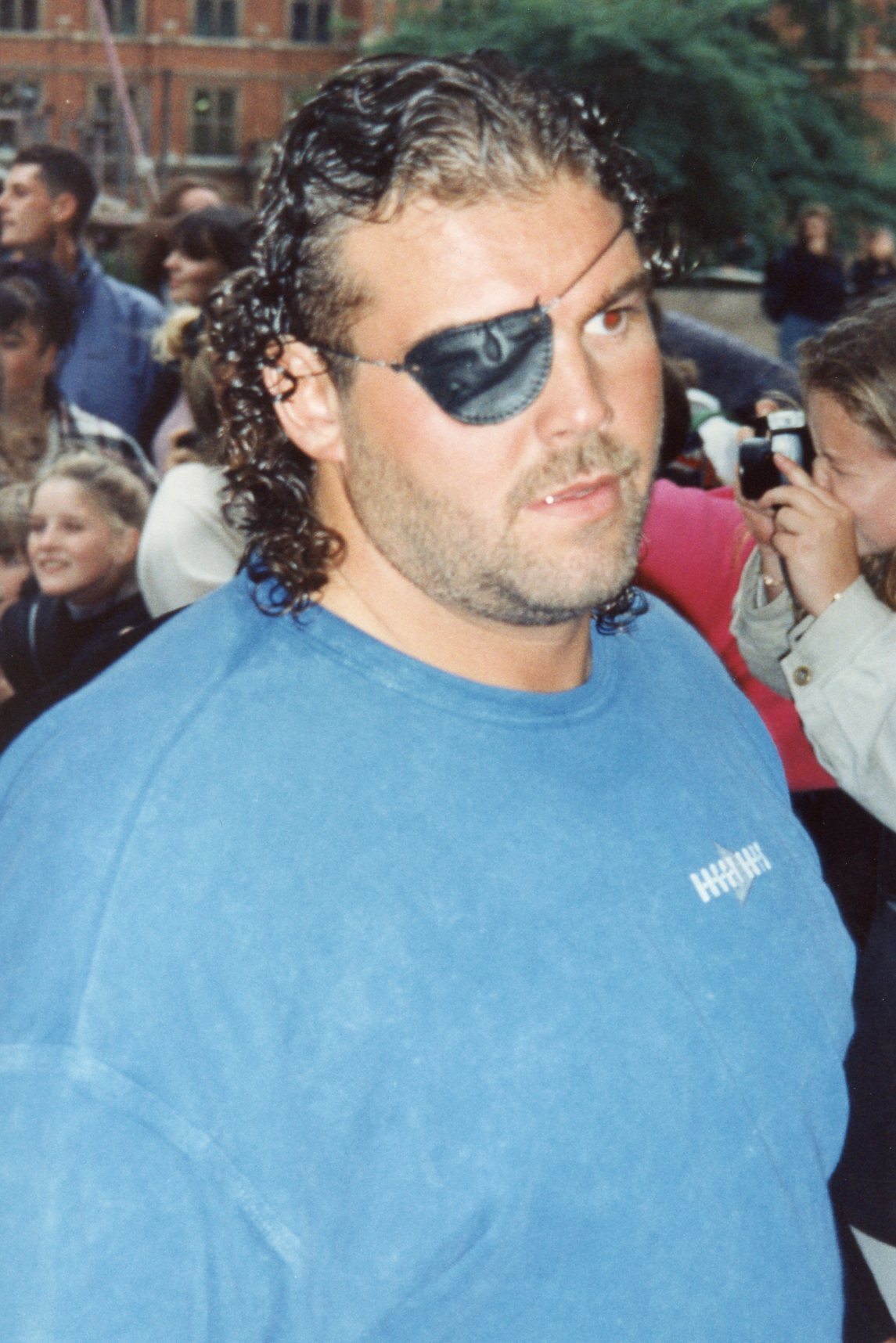
Ouellet as "Jean-Pierre LaFitte" in 1995

In March 1995, Ouellet was repackaged as "Jean-Pierre LaFitte", the supposed descendant of the pirate Jean LaFitte. As a pirate he wore an eyepatch over his blind right eye. He engaged in a three-month feud with Bret Hart and stole the mirrored sunglasses that Hart handed to fans at ringside and Hart's trademark leather jacket. At In Your House 2: The Lumberjacks in July 1995, Hart defeated LaFitte in a dark match.

In September 1995, Ouellet's WWF career was allegedly derailed due to legitimate conflict with The Kliq, a backstage group including main-event wrestlers Shawn Michaels and Diesel. According to Shane Douglas, who was working with the company at that time, a match pitting LaFitte against Nash, then the WWF Champion, in a Montreal Forum house show in LaFitte's hometown of Montreal was booked to end without a clean finish, with Lafitte winning by either DQ or countout, enabling the WWF to return to Montreal for a rematch at a later time. However, due to backstage politicking by Shawn Michaels the booking was reversed into a clean pinfall for Diesel. In turn, LaFitte refused to be pinned by Diesel and the match ended in a double-countout. Due to his refusal to put Diesel over, LaFitte was buried due to the Kliq's influence.

At In Your House 3 on September 24, 1995, Hart faced LaFitte in a rematch. This match ended when Hart forced Ouellet to submit by using the Sharpshooter. In his Wrestling Observer Newsletter, Dave Meltzer described this pay-per-view match as the "show saver" and an "excellent match." Hart later recalled, "In a lot of ways, I loved working with guys like him. He was a guy, that when he threw you in the ropes, he really threw you in the rope...everything he did was power, and at the same time he was a very safe guy.... He took a lot of pride in his work, he really wanted to have a great match with me...And so we worked really hard, and it was a really good match." Hart defeated LaFitte once again on the following episode of Monday Night Raw, ending their feud.

In October 1995, Ouellet participated in the "Full Metal Tour" of Europe. He left the WWF in November 1995.

=== World Championship Wrestling (1996–1997) ===
In September 1996, Ouellet reunited with Jacques Rougeau and moved to World Championship Wrestling (WCW), where the duo was known as The Amazing French Canadians. They wore more traditional wrestling gear. Ouellet kept his beard and eye patch, but the team failed to duplicate the success they had found in the WWF. They had the distinction of losing to Arn Anderson and Steve "Mongo" McMichael in Anderson's last match.

The Amazing French Canadians were managed by Col. Robert Parker (who began dressing in a French Foreign Legion uniform), and they began feuding with Harlem Heat as a result of tension between Parker and Harlem Heat's manager, Sister Sherri. After Harlem Heat defeated the French Canadians at World War 3 on November 24, 1996, Sherri won the right to fight Parker for three minutes.

At a Montreal house show in April 1997, Ouellet won a "patch match" against The Giant via disqualification. He made his final appearance with WCW on the June 16, 1997, episode of Nitro, with he and Rougeau losing to Harlem Heat.

=== Catch Wrestling Association (1997) ===
From September to December 1997, Ouellet wrestled for the Catch Wrestling Association in Hanover and Bremen in Germany. Wrestling as "Jean-Pierre LaFitte", he competed in both the Catch Cup and the International Catch Cup.

=== World Wrestling Federation (1998–2000) ===
Along with Jacques, Ouellet was rehired by the WWF in January 1998. In April 1998, the Quebecers took part in the tag team battle royal at WrestleMania XIV. They disbanded once more in May 1998.

In July 1998, Ouellet competed in the Brawl for All tournament, but lost in the first round to "Dr. Death" Steve Williams.. He lost to Edge (wrestler) twice in July and August 1998. Afterwards, he was taken off the WWF roster and worked in the independents.

In May 1999, Ouellet was sent to the WWF's Memphis, Tennessee-based developmental territory, Power Pro Wrestling, where he was known as "Kris Kannonball". That June, he defeated The Blue Meanie in a dark match for Shotgun Saturday Night.

In July 1999, Ouellet - along with other WWF employees such as Bart Gunn and Vader - worked for All Japan Pro Wrestling as part of a talent loan.

Ouellet left the WWF once more when his contract expired in January 2000, unhappy with the way he was being used.

=== Extreme Championship Wrestling (2000) ===
Ouellet briefly working for Extreme Championship Wrestling in mid-2000, squashing jobbers for several weeks before losing to Justin Credible in a match for Credible's ECW World Heavyweight Championship on ECW Hardcore TV.

=== Return to WCW (2000) ===
Ouellet and Rougeau had a second run in WCW in August 2000, briefly joining Team Canada at the New Blood Rising pay-per-view. Rougeau—who had additionally served as a guest referee in Lance Storm's win over Mike Awesome—left immediately afterwards, upset with the WCW creative team's plans for him, while Ouellet worked two more dates in Canada and was awarded the WCW Hardcore Championship by Storm on August 14 as Storm held three different titles at the same time. He lost the title that same night to Norman Smiley.

Due to working visa issues, Ouellet could not work in the US, and had to be released back to Canada soon after.

=== Independent circuit (2000–2005) ===
Between 2000 and 2003, Ouellet appeared with Rougeau's International Wrestling 2000 promotion. He headlined an event in the Verdun Auditorium in Montreal on December 29, 2000, facing King Kong Bundy in front of an audience of 4,000. In the summer of 2003 Ouellet decided to begin wrestling in the Quebec area once more.

Ouellet returned to the Puerto Rican promotion International Wrestling Association, this time wrestling as Jean-Pierre Laffite. He was brought in by Savio Vega to join his stable, The corporation. Immediately he feuded with then-IWA Intercontinental Champion Ricky Banderas, a feud that lasted around 3 months. He was managed by José Chaparro, another member of Vega's Corporation. At Summer Attitude, after a losing effort to Ricky Banderas. In April 2005 defeated Banderas to win IWA Intercontinental Heavyweight Championship for first time in his career. Lafitte left IWA.

=== NWA: Total Nonstop Action / Total Nonstop Action Wrestling (2003, 2005–2007) ===
In November 2003, Ouellet debuted in NWA Total Nonstop Action as "X", a masked wrestler who competed primarily in the X Division as he had a feud with Christopher Daniels and Sonjay Dutt. He left after two months.

In February 2005, Ouellet began hosting the French version of TNA Impact! from the RDS studios with Marc Blondin, replacing Michel Letourneur. He even had a war of the words against comedian Jean-René Dufort (of Infoman fame), to which Dufort responded by adopting the wrestling gimmick "La Punaise Masquée" (The Masked Tick) and "challenging" Ouellet to a match. However, Dufort backed out before the match could take place. In October 2007 he quit the company and was replaced by Sylvain Grenier.

=== Other WWE appearances (2007, 2008) ===
In October 2007, Ouellet wrestled a dark match for World Wrestling Entertainment under the name of "Carl Ouellet" at the ECW / SmackDown! tapings. He was defeated by Tommy Dreamer.

In July 2008, Ouellet lost to Charlie Haas on Monday Night Raw in a dark match. In an interview with Slam! Sports on August 6, 2008, Ouellet declared that he would like another stint with the WWE.

=== Independent circuit (2005–2011, 2016–present) ===
In the mid-2000s, Ouellet wrestled for the Montreal-based International Wrestling Syndicate and the Hull-based CPW International promotion, under the "Pierre Carl Ouellet" name once again.

Ouellet also wrestled for All-Star promotions in Britain alongside his friend and tag team partners Rene Dupree. Ouellet has mainly been working a lot of Tag Team matches with Rene Dupree, Robbie Dynamite, Hannibal and Mikey Whiplash. He defeated Sylvain Grenier in an RDS battle on June 21, 2008, in Hawkesbury, Ontario Canada with Marc Blondin serving as the special referee. He then defeated long-time rival Kevin Nash on May 30, 2009, at the International Wrestling Syndicate's 10th Anniversary show by making him submit via an armbar.

Ouellet retired from professional wrestling on February 8, 2011.

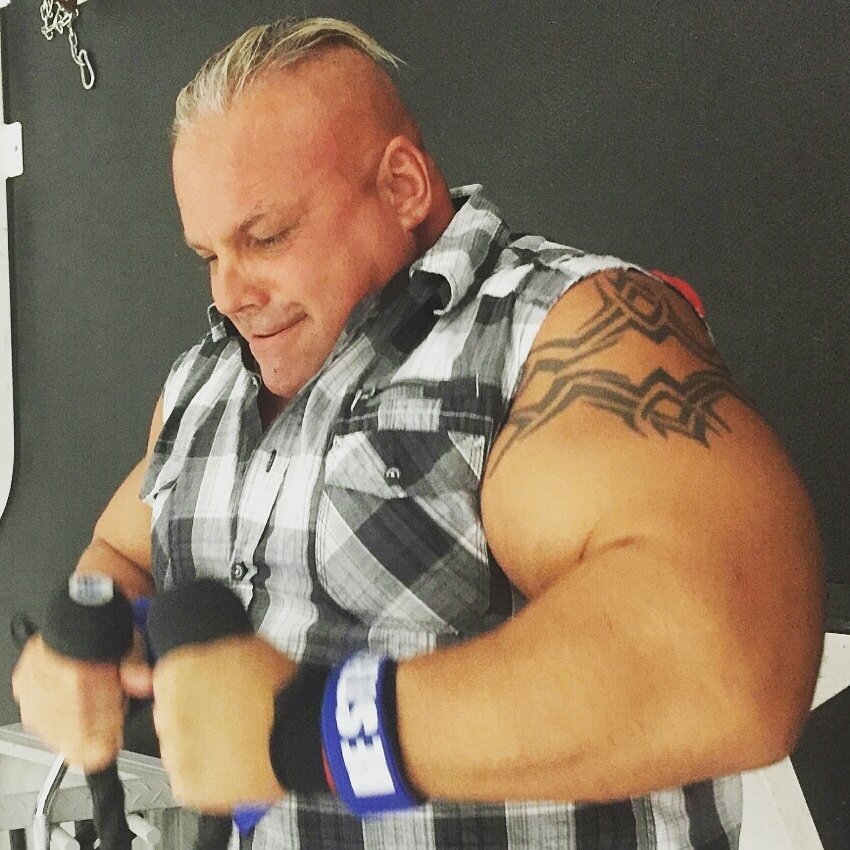
PCO in 2016

On May 21, 2016, Ouellet made his return to professional wrestling at an MWF event, entitled "Collision," in Valleyfield, Quebec, Canada, defeating Jake Matthews, following a cannonball. On November 5, 2017, Ouellet, as "Quebecer" Jean-Pierre Lafitte, defeated Hannibal to win the Great North Wrestling Canadian Championship in Rockland, ON. On May 25, 2018, Ouellet was defeated by Hannibal via disqualification in a Great North Wrestling Championship rematch in Pembroke, ON. Post-match, Ouellet was stripped of the championship for his assault on GNW President, Michael Andrews.

In 2018, Ouellet began wrestling as "PCO" (originally a contraction of his long-term former ring name, "Pierre Carl Ouellet", but later stated to be an initialism for "Perfect Creation One"). Under a new gimmick as a "French Frankenstein" as Ouellet described it, he became a regular name in several independent promotions. On April 2, 2018, Ouellet defeated Walter at Game Changer Wrestling's (GCW) Joey Janela's Spring Break 2 in New Orleans. Ouellet's performance and online footage of his unconventional workout regimen impressed the independent wrestling audience, and led to many higher-profile bookings.

On June 18, 2018, Ouellet was announced as the first of twenty-four participants for Pro Wrestling Guerrilla's (PWG) annual Battle of Los Angeles tournament. At 2018 Battle of Los Angeles – Stage One on September 15, he made his company debut, losing to Brody King in the Opening Round. Two nights later, at 2018 Battle of Los Angeles – Final Stage, he led a losers' ten-man tag team match, in which Team PCO (Ouellet, Darby Allin, Dan Barry, Jody Fleisch and Puma King) defeated Team DJ Z (DJ Z, Adam Brooks, David Starr, T-Hawk and Timothy Thatcher).

=== Ring of Honor (2018–2021) ===
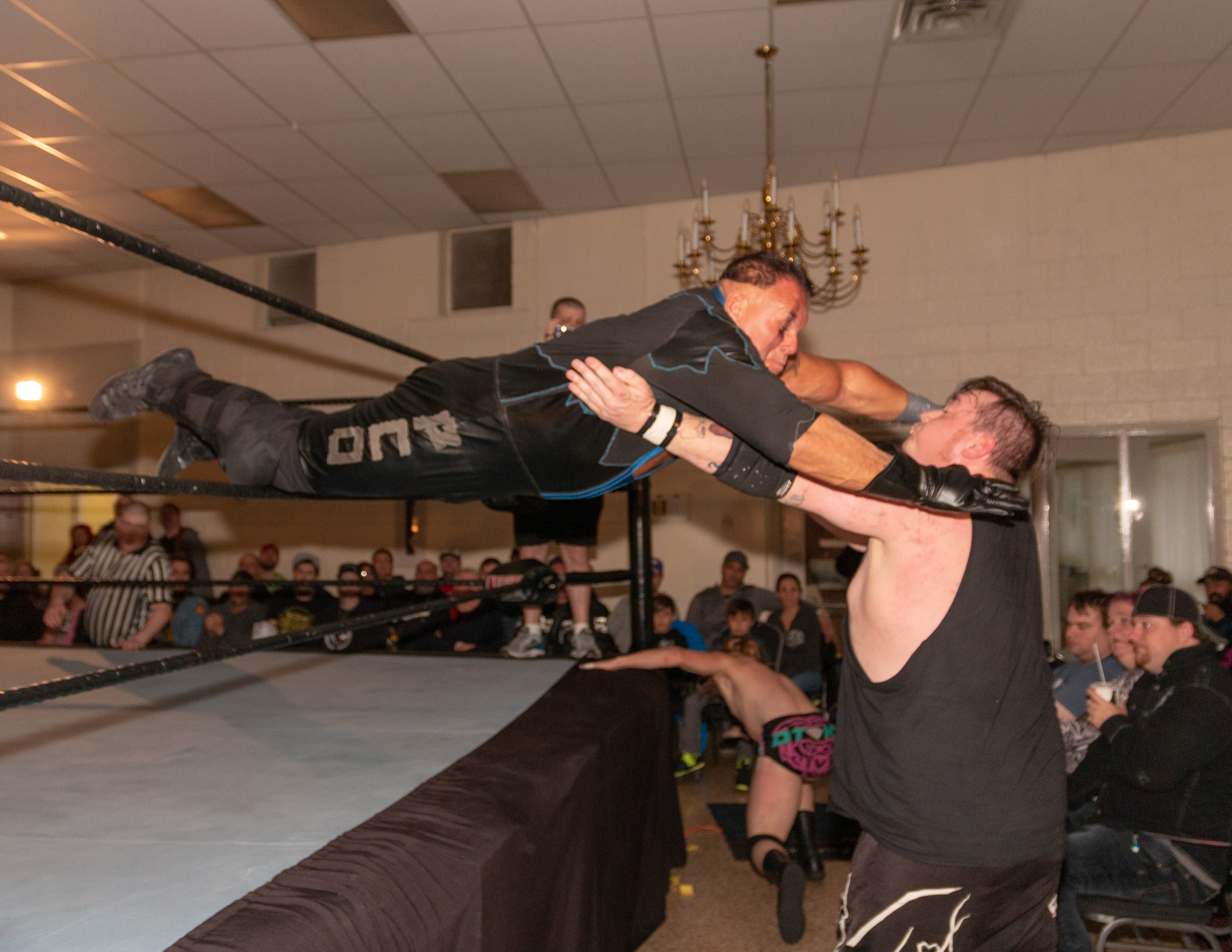
PCO performing a dive onto Rickey Shane Page in 2018

On December 1, 2018, Ouellet announced his exclusive signing with Ring of Honor. He debuted for ROH at the December 15 tapings joining up with Marty Scurll and Brody King in a new stable called Villain Enterprises. At Honor Reigns Supreme 2019, Villain Enterprises defeated Silas Young and the Briscoe Brothers. PCO and King would then go on to win the 2019 ROH Tag Wars Tournament during the ROH Road To G1 Supercard tour in February 2019, and on March 15, 2019, he and King defeated the Briscoes to win the ROH World Tag Team Championship for the first time in a Las Vegas street fight at the ROH 17th Anniversary Show. The following night at the Ring of Honor Wrestling tapings, PCO, King and Scurll defeated The Kingdom to win the ROH World Six-Man Tag Team Championship, making PCO a double champion within a 24-hour span.

At the G1 Supercard, PCO and King dropped the ROH World Tag Team Championship to the Guerrillas of Destiny in a winner takes all four-way tag team match also including the Briscoe Brothers and Evil and Sanada, with G.O.D.'s IWGP Tag Team Championship belts also on the line. In a Six Man Tag title defence, PCO would get the winning fall over ROH World Champion Matt Taven, which gave him a future title opportunity.

On April 27 at the 2019 Crockett Cup event, PCO and King won the eight-team tournament (winning three matches in the same night) to not only win the Crockett Cup Trophy, but also win the vacant NWA World Tag Team Championship as well. At War of the Worlds, PCO challenged ROH World Champion Matt Taven for the championship, however he was defeated. The following night, PCO continued his feud with Taven by attacking Taven following his win over Mark Haskins. PCO would then compete in a Four Corner Survival match to determine the #1 contender for the ROH World Championship which was won by Jeff Cobb. At State of the Art, PCO competed in a DEFY or DENY match for the ROH World Championship which was won by Taven. At Death Before Dishonor XVII, PCO defeated Kenny King in a First-round match in the Final Battle ROH World Championship #1 contender tournament. At Glory By Honor XVII, PCO defeated fellow member of Villain Enterprises Marty Scurll in the finals of the tournament to become the #1 contender for the ROH World Championship. At Final Battle, PCO defeated Rush to become the ROH World Champion, in the process once again becoming a double champion in ROH, as well as becoming a world champion for the first time in his career. After his title win, Villain Enterpraises feuded with Rush's La Facción Ingobernable, retaining the World title against Dragon Lee, but losing against Rush on February 29. at Best in the World, PCO and Danhausen defeated The Bouncers (Brian Milonas and Beer City Bruiser).

=== Impact Wrestling / Total Nonstop Action Wrestling (2022–2024) ===
==== Honor No More (2022–2023) ====
At Hard To Kill, on January 8, 2022, PCO made his return to TNA, now known as Impact Wrestling, appeared along with Matt Taven, Vincent, Mike Bennett, and Maria, attacking Eddie Edwards, Rich Swann, Willie Mack, Heath and Rhino. On January 13, it was revealed that PCO had signed a contract with Impact. on the January 27 episode of Impact Wrestling, PCO defeated Chris Sabin. At No Surrender, Honor No More (Matt Taven, PCO, Mike Bennett, Vincent, and Kenny King) defeated Team Impact (Chris Sabin, Rhino, Rich Swann, Steve Maclin, and Willie Mack) in a 10-man tag team match to remain in Impact. At Sacrifice, PCO lost to Jonah. At Multiverse of Matches, PCO and Moose lost to Josh Alexander and Jonah. On the April 14 episode of Impact Wrestling, PCO lost to Jonah. On April 24 PCO defeated Jonah in a Monsters Ball match in Poughkeepsie NY for a TV episode to be aired on May 5.

On October 20 episode of Impact Wrestling, PCO would turn face by leaving Honor No More attacking his partners after Eddie Edwards quoted, "PCO is nothing but a bitch!" On April 16, 2023, at Rebellion, PCO defeated Edwards in a Last Rites match to end their rivalry. On October 24, with Impact rebranding themselves under the revived Total Nonstop Action Wrestling name entering the following year, PCO was announced as the first signee of its new area.

==== Digital Media Champion (2024) ====
In the summer of 2024, PCO began a kayfabe relationship with Steph De Lander. On the May 30 episode of iMPACT, PCO gave De Lander a "Love Note". On the June 20 episode of iMPACT, In an in-ring date segment, De Lander explained how it was nice to meet a "normal" guy for once and that she has dated so many "weirdos". The two went on to eat black spaghetti before being interrupted by First Class (reigning TNA Digital Media Champion, A.J Francis, and Rich Swann). Francis would then throw champagne at PCO and Swann would superkick him. De Lander would try to intervene, but Francis would then slam De Lander through a table, sparking a feud between PCO and A.J Francis. On the July 11 episode of iMPACT, After Francis successfully defended the TNA Digital Media Championship against Rhino, PCO appeared to attack Francis but was unsuccessful. PCO was then booked against Francis for the TNA Digital Media Championship and Canadian International Heavyweight Championship at Slammiversary. At the event, PCO defeated Francis to win the TNA Digital Media Championship and the International Heavyweight Championship for the first time in his career. After the match, Steph De Lander proposed to PCO, to which he responded, "Oui" ("Yes" in French).

On the August 1 episode of TNA Impact, PCO and De Lander's wedding was interrupted by a returning Matt Cardona, who attacked him and ruined their wedding. While feuding with Cardona, PCO successfully defended the Digital Media Championship and International Heavyweight Championship against Shera at Emergence and Rhino in a no disqualification match on the October 17 episode of Impact!. PCO's rivalry with Cardona intensified during the following months, culminating in a Monster's Ball match at Bound for Glory, which PCO won to retain his titles. Following the event, PCO formed a tag team with Sami Callihan and began pursuing the TNA World Tag Team Championship. At Final Resolution, PCO and Callihan participated in a three-way tag team match against Jake Something and The Rascalz. Rascalz won the match.

PCO's contract with TNA expired at the end of 2024 while he still held the TNA Digital Media Championship. PCO's last match in TNA took place on December 14, in which he and Callihan lost to the World Tag Team Champions The Hardys in a non-title match; the match aired on the January 16, 2025 episode of Impact! following his departure.

=== Game Changer Wrestling (2025) ===
On January 19, 2025, PCO appeared at the Game Changer Wrestling (GCW) event "The People vs. GCW", winning a Rumble match. During the event, he smashed the TNA Digital Media championship with a sledgehammer and attempted to make a shoot promo against TNA before the feed abruptly cut. Journalist Dave Meltzer suggested that PCO was disgruntled due to TNA having rescinded a contract offer, then asked him to lose the title in his final appearance. In August 2025, PCO returned to GCW at its cross-promotioonal "2-Day War" pay-per-view with Juggalo Championship Wrestling (JCW), teaming with Nate Webb in a loss to the Outbreak.

== Personal life ==
Ouellet has a daughter. He lost vision in his right eye at the age of 12 after an accident with a pellet gun.

== Championships and accomplishments ==
- Black Label Pro
  - BLP Heavyweight Championship (1 time)
- Catch Wrestling Association
  - CWA World Tag Team Champion (1 time) – with Rhino Richards
- CPW International
  - CPW Tag Team Championship (1 time) – with Dangerous Dan
- International Wrestling Association
  - IWA Intercontinental Championship (1 time)
- Game Changer Wrestling
  - GCW Extreme Championship (1 time)
- Great North Wrestling
  - GNW Canadian Championship (1 time)
- International Wrestling Syndicate
  - IWS World Heavyweight Championship (1 time)
  - Tag Team Royal Rumble (2004) – with Sid Vicious
- Insane Wrestling Revolution
  - IWR Tag Team Championship (1 time, current) - with Danhausen
- Jonquiere Championship Wrestling
  - JCW Heavyweight Championship (1 time)
- Juggalo Championship Wrestling
  - JCW World Tag Team Championship (1 time) – with Mickie Knuckles as Luciano Family Enterprises
- Lucha Libre AAA Worldwide
  - World Cup Lucha Libre World Cup Award (1 time)
    - Men's MVP (2023)
- National Wrestling Alliance
  - NWA World Tag Team Championship (1 time) – with Brody King
  - Crockett Cup (2019) – with Brody King
- North Pro Wrestling
  - NPW Heavyweight Championship (1 time)
- Pro Wrestling Illustrated
  - Ranked No. 393 of the top 500 singles wrestlers of the "PWI Years" in 2003
  - Ranked No. 31 of the top 500 singles wrestlers in the PWI 500 in 2020
  - Ranked No. 83 of the top 100 tag teams of the PWI Years with Jacques Rougeau in 2003
- Ring of Honor
  - ROH World Championship (1 time)
  - ROH World Six-Man Tag Team Championship (1 time) – with Brody King and Marty Scurll
  - ROH World Tag Team Championship (1 time) – with Brody King
  - Tag Wars (2019) – with Brody King
  - ROH World Championship No.1 Contendership Tournament (2019)
  - ROH Year-End Award (2 times)
    - Holy S*** Moment of the Year (2019)
    - Faction of the Year (2019) – with Villain Enterprises
- Top of the World Wrestling
  - TOW Tag Team Championship (1 time) – with Al Snow
- Total Nonstop Action Wrestling
  - Canadian International Heavyweight Championship (1 time)
  - TNA Digital Media Championship (1 time)
  - Gravy Train Turkey Trot (2023) – with Jake Something, Mike Bailey, and Johnny Swinger
- World Championship Wrestling
  - WCW Hardcore Championship (1 time)
- World Wrestling Federation
  - WWF Tag Team Championship (3 times) – with Quebecer Jacques
- Xtreme Zone Wrestling
  - XZW Ironman Championship (1 time)
