= Jacques Rougeau =

Canadian professional wrestler (born 1960)

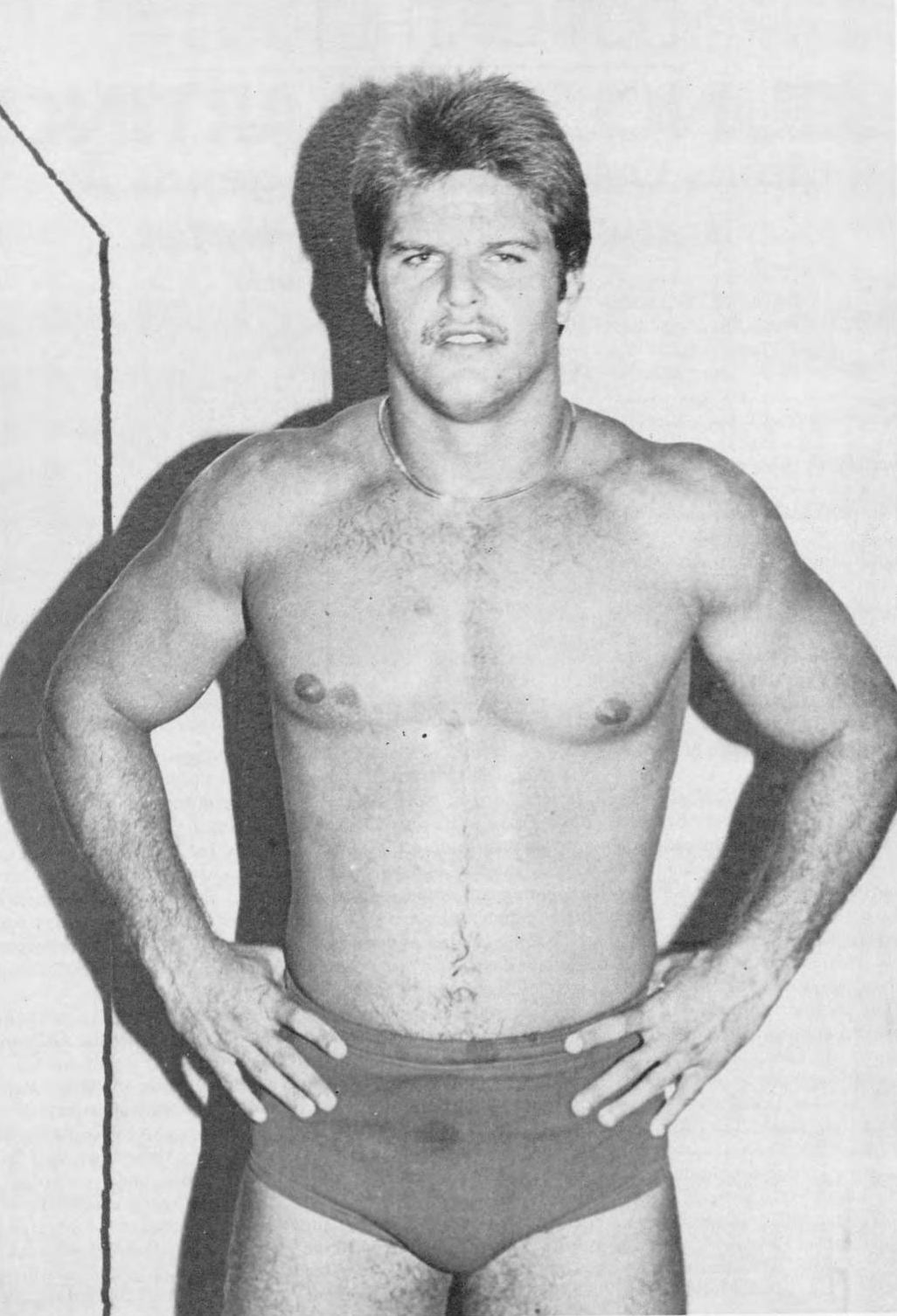
- Rougeau Jr. in 1983

Personal information
- Born: Jacques Rougeau Jr. June 13, 1960 (age 66) Saint-Sulpice, Quebec, Canada
- Spouse: Nathalie Thibodeau (m. 1978)
- Children: 3
- Family: Rougeau

Professional wrestling career
- Ring name(s): Jacques Rougeau; Jacques Rougeau Jr. Jerry Roberts; The Mountie; Quebecer Jacques
- Billed height: 6 ft 1 in (185 cm)
- Billed weight: 257 lb (117 kg)
- Billed from: Montreal, Quebec; Canada (as The Mountie)
- Trained by: Jacques Rougeau Sr.
- Debut: October 14, 1977
- Retired: August 18, 2018

Jacques Rougeau Jr. (born June 13, 1960) is a Canadian former professional wrestler best known for his appearances in the 1980s and 1990s with the World Wrestling Federation. He began his career under his real name as half of the tag team The Fabulous Rougeaus with his brother Raymond Rougeau. In 1991, he began a singles career as the Mountie, winning the WWF Intercontinental Championship once. In 1993, he formed three time WWF Tag Team Championship winning tag team The Quebecers with Pierre Ouellet.

== Professional wrestling career ==
At least three of Jacques' family members were wrestling promoters and/or wrestled themselves: his older brother Ray, his father Jacques Sr., and his uncle Jean "Johnny" Rougeau. Jacques' sister Johanne also promoted wrestling matches in Montreal, and brother Armand wrestled for smaller federations.

=== Early career (1977–1985) ===
Jacques Rougeau began his career in 1977, working in Stu Hart's Calgary, Alberta based Stampede Wrestling promotion. In the 1980s he began wrestling in the United States, achieving success in Alabama and Tennessee, and in 1985 he and Ray were signed by the World Wrestling Federation.

=== World Wrestling Federation (1986–1994) ===
==== Fabulous Rougeaus (1986–1990) ====
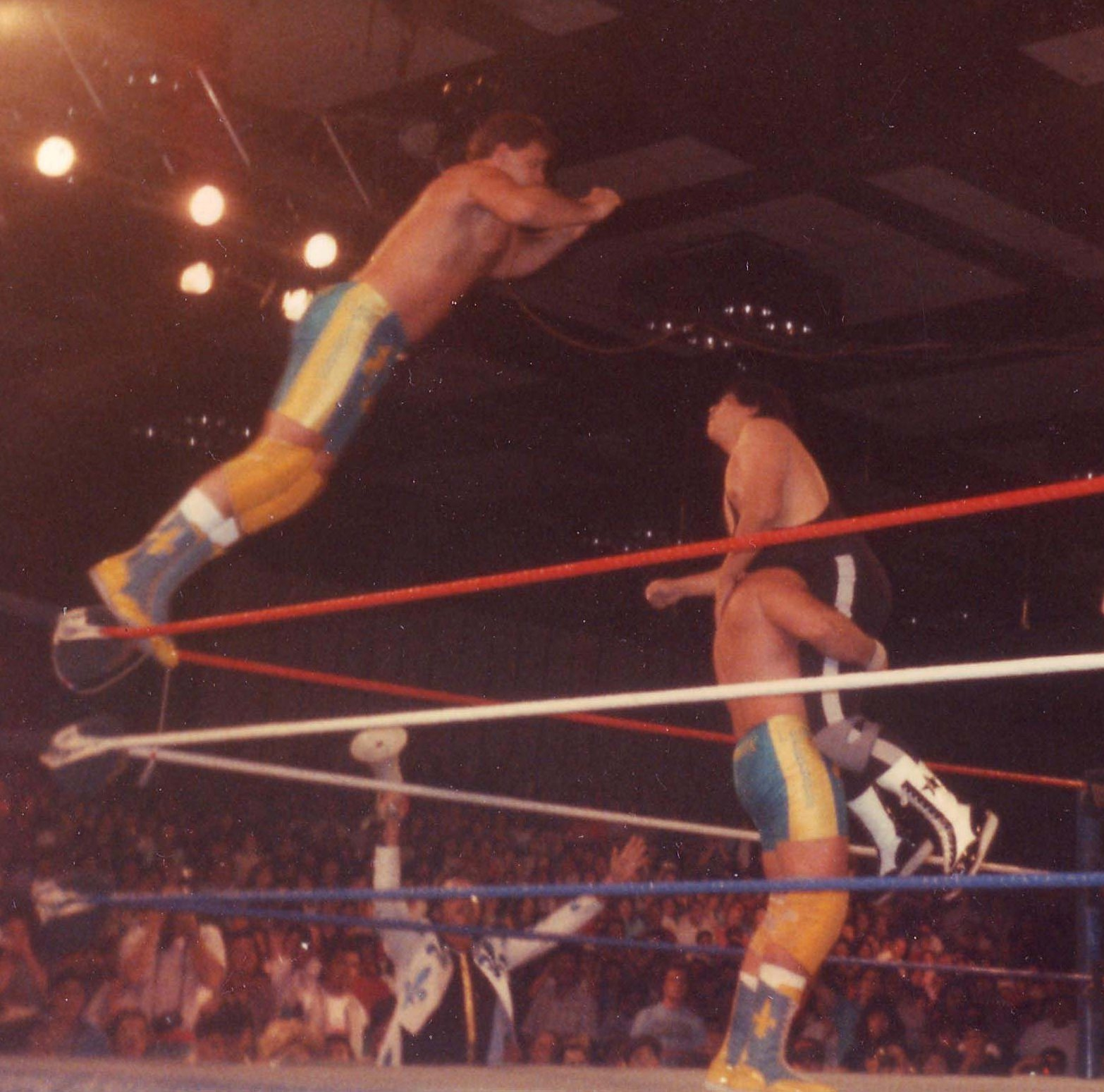
Jacques Rougeau and his brother Raymond as the Rougeau Brothers, March 1989

Jacques debuted in the WWE (then WWF) on February 26, 1986, during the Australian leg of the company's International Tour, in a losing effort against Moondog Rex. Raymond, who was victorious in his debut match against Moondog Spot the same night, debuted alongside Jacques 6 days later, winning their debut match as the "Fabulous Rougeaus" against the Moondogs.In their first year in the WWE, the Fabulous Rougeaus claimed tag-team victories against The Hart Foundation (Bret Hart and Jim Neidhart), The Moondogs, Jimmy Jack and Dory Funk Jr., and The Dream Team (Greg Valentine and Brutus Beefcake),.

Although they lost their match at WrestleMania III in 1987 to Valentine and Beefcake, they briefly upset The Hart Foundation for the WWF Tag Team Championship at the Montreal Forum on August 10 that year. The decision was reversed to a disqualification and the championship returned, since the challengers initially won after using Jimmy Hart's megaphone as a weapon.

After two years in the Federation, The Fabulous Rougeaus turned heel. The Canadian brothers began being announced as "From Canada, but soon to relocate to the United States" and debuted an intentionally annoying entrance song, in which they sang (partly in French) about being "All-American Boys" and their manager, Jimmy Hart. They were also briefly billed from Memphis, Hart's home city. They mockingly waved tiny American flags to the chagrin of many American fans. They would humorously attempt to start "USA!" chants, which led to further negative fan "heat". According to Jacques, the widespread antipathy of American fans inspired Vince McMahon to turn them into heels. They feuded with The Killer Bees, The Hart Foundation (who had turned face in between), The Bushwhackers, and The Rockers during their heel run.

==== The Mountie (1991–1992) ====
Ray Rougeau retired in early 1990, ending his tag-team partnership with Jacques. Jacques departed the Federation for a year before redebuting in January 1991, once again alongside Jimmy Hart. The Mountie character was that of a corrupt, cattle prod-wielding member of the Royal Canadian Mounted Police (RCMP), who often boasted that he "always gets his man" (a phrase long associated with the RCMP, which insinuated that criminals cannot escape from Canada's federal police force). The cattle prod came into play as part of The Mountie's post-match gimmick, where he would handcuff, berate and then "shock" his defeated and helpless opponents in the stomach. The story of the character change was that Jacques Rougeau had actually gone through the training to become a Mountie to wield authority.

The RCMP objected to Rougeau's portrayal as The Mountie, claiming it was damaging their image and made children think the police were villains. The WWF did concede slightly by adding a disclaimer that Rougeau did not represent the RCMP. The RCMP filed a lawsuit in Canadian courts to ban the character from television. They eventually reached a legal settlement with the WWF that Rougeau would wrestle under his own name and not as The Mountie in Canada, but could continue to wrestle as The Mountie in the United States and elsewhere in the world.

In his pay-per-view debut, The Mountie defeated Koko B. Ware at the 1991 Royal Rumble. He gained another major victory at WrestleMania VII, defeating Tito Santana after using the shock stick. The Mountie began a feud with the Big Boss Man after declaring that he was the sole legitimate law enforcer in the WWF, and on August 26, 1991, he spent a night in prison (kayfabe) after Bossman defeated him in a Jailhouse Match at SummerSlam. At the 1991 Survivor Series, Mountie teamed with Ric Flair, Ted DiBiase and The Warlord to defeat Roddy Piper, Bret Hart, Virgil and Davey Boy Smith in a four-on-four Survivor Series elimination match.

The Mountie's greatest achievement as a singles wrestler came when he won the WWF Intercontinental Heavyweight Championship in an upset over Bret Hart on January 17, 1992. In the storyline, Hart was suffering from the flu (Hart was actually going through contract negotiations). The Mountie lost the title just two days later to Rowdy Roddy Piper at the 1992 Royal Rumble, in what was one of the shortest Intercontinental Heavyweight Championship reigns. The Mountie received a rematch at the February 8 Saturday Night's Main Event XXX, but when he attempted to use his shock stick, it had no effect as Piper was wearing a rubber vest under his T-shirt. Piper removed his shirt after the match to reveal the vest, which was labeled "Shock Proof". Piper won the match after using the shock stick on The Mountie.

For the next several months, The Mountie primarily appeared in the undercard. He was on the losing end of an eight-man tag team match at WrestleMania VIII and a six-man tag team match at SummerSlam. He feuded with Sgt. Slaughter after shocking him with an extra large cattle prod on an episode of Superstars, though the subsequent matches all took place on house shows that summer, with no conclusion on television. After losing to then WWF World Heavyweight Champion Bret Hart in seventy-five seconds on October 26, 1992, Rougeau left the WWF, and went to go wrestle in the World Wrestling Council (WWC) in Puerto Rico.

==== The Quebecers (1993–1994) ====
Jacques returned to the WWF in July 1993. Shortly thereafter, Rougeau began tagging with Pierre Ouellet as The Quebecers. The team, who feuded with Steiner Brothers, Men on a Mission, The Headshrinkers, Marty Jannetty and The 1–2–3 Kid, were three-time WWF Tag Team Champions. The Quebecers characters were an extension of the earlier Mountie-theme, albeit with a more casual costume and an emphasis on bullying behavior. The pair (who were managed by Johnny Polo) emphasized their detachment from the earlier Mountie controversy by using a doctored version of Jacques's second Mountie theme song, titled "We're Not The Mounties", with the lyrics modified to insult the RCMP - for example, "because the Mountie always gets his man" became "unlike the Mounties, we always get our man". Jacques participated in the main event of the 1993 Survivor Series as a member of the "Foreign Fanatics" team. At the Royal Rumble, The Quebecers defeated Bret Hart and Owen Hart by referee stoppage to retain the WWF Tag Team Championship. At WrestleMania X, The Quebecers faced Men on a Mission for the WWF Tag Team Championship and retained after getting counted out. They lost the title to Men on a Mission at a house show on March 29, 1994, in London, England. The Quebecers won the belts back on March 31 at another house show. They lost the championship to The Headshrinkers on the April 26 episode of Raw and split up soon after.

The Quebecers broke up at a house show in the Montreal Forum on June 25, 1994. After a loss to The Headshrinkers, Pierre and Polo turned on Rougeau. After a few minutes of Jacques being attacked in front of his hometown crowd, Raymond Rougeau (who by this point was an announcer for the WWF's French-language broadcasts) ran to the ring to save his brother. This angle led to Jacques Rougeau's first retirement match, which, over the next few months, was heavily promoted on WWF TV shows broadcast in the Montreal area and in the local media. The match, held on October 21, 1994, drew a sell-out crowd of 16,843 to the Montreal Forum, and resulted in a victory for Jacques, when he pinned Pierre following a seated tombstone piledriver. Jacques, who was accompanied by Raymond, used Queen's song "We Are the Champions" as his theme music for the night.

=== World Championship Wrestling (1996–1997) ===
On September 9, 1996, Rougeau came out of retirement reuniting with Ouellet as they debuted as The Amazing French Canadians in World Championship Wrestling in a losing effort against The Nasty Boys. In 1997, Jacques became one of few wrestlers to cleanly defeat then-WCW Heavyweight Champion Hollywood Hogan, claiming a singles victory at the Molson Centre in Montreal. On the Right After Wrestling program on Sirius Satellite Radio Channel 98, Jacques told hosts Arda Ocal and Jimmy Korderas that Hogan put him over because of his respect for the Rougeau family name and for keeping a clean wrestling image. On Colt Cabana's Art of Wrestling podcast, Rougeau's former student, Kevin Owens stated that there is a rumor that Hogan lay down for Rougeau for an additional $10,000 payment. Rougeau said that he paid and organized the show, so it was a Jacques Rougeau show, not a WCW show.

=== Return to WWF (1998) ===
In January 1998, Rougeau returned to the WWF for a final run teaming once again with Pierre Ouellet in an updated version of The Quebecers. This incarnation of the team still used the ring attire from their WCW run as the Amazing French Canadians. The team were also one of the 14 tag teams eliminated in the tag team battle royal at WrestleMania XIV, leading to a win for the Legion of Doom. Rougeau teamed up with his brother, Ray (who at the time was a commentator, announcer and host for the French-produced WWF programming) alongside Ouellet in a dark match for WWF Shotgun Saturday Night where they defeated the team of Edge, Shawn Stasiak, and Tom Brandi. They failed to achieve the same success they enjoyed during their prior run, with their only notable feud being with The Godwinns, where the Godwinns went over. Both Rougeau and Ouellet left the WWF in August 1998.

=== Later career and retirement (1998–present) ===
After WWF, Rougeau was the promoter for the Montreal-based Lutte International 2000 where he wrestled on occasion.

Rougeau and Ouellet briefly reunited in WCW in 2000 in Lance Storm's Team Canada. After WCW, Rougeau and Ouellet went their separate ways.

Rougeau continued working in his promotion until wrestling his last match on December 27, 2011 with his son Jean-Jacques as they defeated Kurrgan and Frank The Machine in Repentigny, Quebec. After his last match, Rougeau decided to close down Lutte International 2000.

After retiring, Rougeau attempted to join the Montreal Police Department, but was unable to do so as he had not graduated from high school. He is now a public speaker, touring schools to speak on drugs, smoking, and bullying. He opened the Rougeau Wrestling School in Montreal in 1998.

In 2018, Rougeau announced that he would retire for a third time, and that he had closed his wrestling school. On August 18, 2018, shortly after his retirement announcement, Rougeau mirrored his father's retirement matching by teaming with his sons for the first and only time. As Rougeau's sons, all of whom have wrestled, have expressed no desire to return to wrestling, Jacques' retirement effectively ended the Rougeau family wrestling dynasty after more than six decades.

On May 30, 2026, Rougeau won a battle royal eliminating David Hart Smith in Gatineau, Quebec.

On July 26, 2026, The Rougeau's made an appearance at AEW Redemption, being honored in Montreal.

== Personal life ==
Rougeau is divorced from Nathalie Thibodeau, whom he married in 1978. He and Thibodeau had three sons: Cedric, Emile, and Jean-Jacques. Former NHL ice hockey defenceman Denis Gauthier is Rougeau's nephew.

== Championships and accomplishments ==
- Central States Wrestling
  - NWA Central States Tag Team Championship (1 time) – with Bruce Reed
- Continental Wrestling Association
  - AWA Southern Heavyweight Championship (2 times)
  - NWA Mid-America Heavyweight Championship (2 times)
- Southeastern Championship Wrestling
  - NWA Alabama Heavyweight Championship (1 time)
  - NWA Southeastern Heavyweight Championship (Northern Division) (1 time)
- Lutte Internationale
  - Canadian International Tag Team Championship (4 times) – with Raymond Rougeau
- Lutte Internationale 2000
  - Johnny Rougeau Tag Team Championship (1 Time) – with Raymond Rougeau
- Pro Wrestling Illustrated
  - PWI ranked him #41 of the 500 best singles wrestlers of the year in the PWI 500 in 1992
  - PWI ranked him # 222 of the 500 best singles wrestlers of the PWI Years in 2003.
  - PWI ranked him # 83 of the 100 best tag teams of the PWI Years with Pierre Ouellet in 2003.
- World Wrestling Federation
  - WWF Intercontinental Championship (1 time)
  - WWF Tag Team Championship (3 times) – with Pierre Ouellet
