= Raymond Rougeau =

Canadian professional wrestler (born 1955)

His Worship Raymond Rougeau
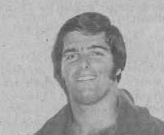
- Rougeau, circa 1979

Mayor of Rawdon
- Incumbent
- Assumed office November 16, 2021
- Preceded by: Bruno Guibault

Personal details
- Born: Raymond Rougeau; February 18, 1955 (age 71) Saint-Sulpice, Québec, Canada
- Party: Équipe Raymond Rougeau - Pour Rawdon
- Children: 1
- Professional wrestling career
- Ring names: Ray Rougeau; Raymond Rougeau
- Billed height: 5 ft 11 in (180 cm)
- Billed weight: 229 lb (104 kg)
- Billed from: Montreal, Quebec; From Canada, but soon to relocate to the United States; Memphis, Tennessee
- Trained by: Jacques Rougeau Sr.; Eddie Auger
- Debut: 1971
- Retired: 2000

Raymond Rougeau (born February 18, 1955) is a Canadian politician, former professional wrestler and French language commentator. He most notably worked for the World Wrestling Federation between 1986 and 2002, firstly as one of The Fabulous Rougeaus, and has been the mayor of Rawdon, Quebec, since 2021.

== Professional wrestling career ==
=== Canada and Georgia (1971–1986) ===
Raymond Rougeau began training with his father Jacques Rougeau, Sr. and his great-uncle Eddie Auger at the age of fourteen. He debuted in 1971 at the age of sixteen in Joliette for his father's Montreal promotion as a babyface. In 1974 he and his father fought The Love Brothers in Toronto. In 1976, Raymond relocated to Atlanta, Georgia to work for Jim Barnett in the National Wrestling Alliance (NWA) along with his close friend Pierre Lefebvre. In 1985 he and his brother Jacques Rougeau Jr. fought Ron and Jimmy Garvin in Montreal.

=== World Wrestling Federation (1986-2002) ===
==== Fabulous Rougeaus (1986–1990) ====
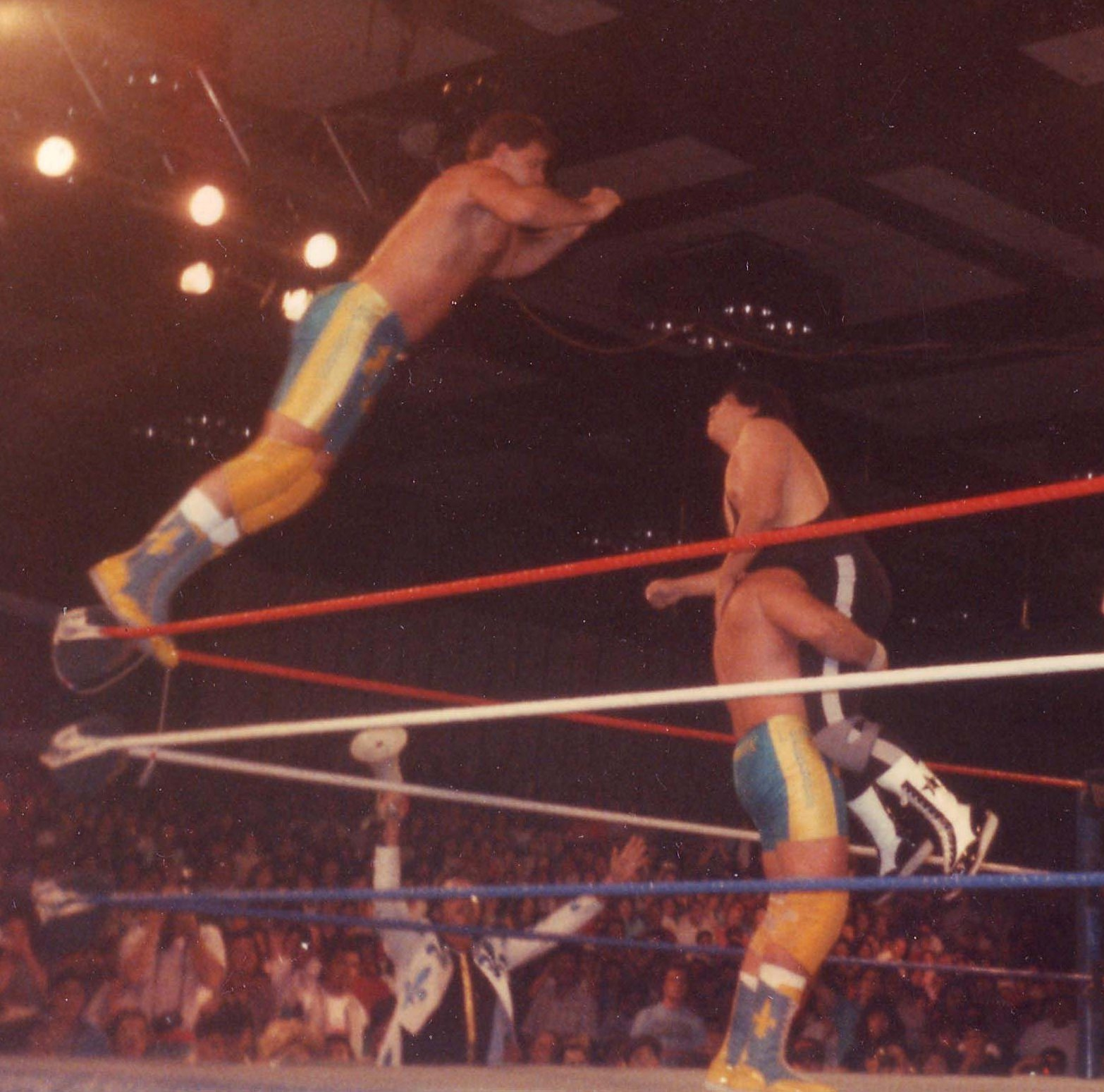
Raymond Rougeau and his brother Jacques as the Rougeau Brothers, March 1989

In February 1986, Raymond and his brother joined the World Wrestling Federation, debuting during a tour of Australia. During their first year with the company they faced and defeated such duos as The Hart Foundation (Bret Hart and Jim Neidhart), The Moondogs, Jimmy Jack and Dory Funk, Jr., and The Dream Team (Greg Valentine and Brutus Beefcake). Although they lost their match at WrestleMania III in 1987 to Valentine and Beefcake, they briefly upset The Hart Foundation for the WWF Tag Team Championship at the Montreal Forum on August 10 that year. The decision was reversed to a disqualification and the championship returned, since the challengers initially won after using Jimmy Hart's megaphone as a weapon. After two years in the Federation, The Fabulous Rougeaus (Jacques and Raymond) turned heel when they participated in an angle in which the Canadian brothers were announced as "From Canada, but soon to relocate to the United States", and had an intentionally annoying entrance theme in which they sang (partly in French) about being "All-American Boys" as well as now having Jimmy Hart as their manager (The Rougeaus were also briefly billed as being from Memphis, Jimmy Hart's home city). They also waved tiny American flags, infuriating fans, who questioned their sincerity, and humorously attempted to start "USA!" chants, which led to further negative fan "heat". According to Jacques, the widespread antipathy of American fans inspired Vince McMahon to turn them into heels. They feuded with The Killer Bees, The Hart Foundation (who had turned face in between), The Bushwhackers and The Rockers during their heel run.

Raymond went into semi-retirement three months after SummerSlam in 1989. His last match in the WWF was at the Royal Rumble in 1990, which the Rougeau Brothers lost to The Bushwhackers.

==== Commentator (1992–2002) ====
In October 1992, Rougeau replaced Edouard Carpentier as the play-by-play commentator for the French syndicated WWF programming distributed to Quebec, Europe and Africa. He commentated alongside Guy Hauray from October 1992 to April 1994, then Jean Brassard from May 1994 to November 1998 when the WWF stopped producing French-language TV shows. It resumed in January 2000 after the WWF landed a new TV deal in France and Rougeau returned with a new co-host, Philippe Hartman, until January 2002.

As his brother was still an active competitor as one half of The Quebecers alongside Pierre, Pierre turned and started attacking Jacques. Raymond left the commentary table and ran to the ring to save his brother. Rougeau later accompanied Jacques in his first retirement match in the WWF, held in Montreal.

Rougeau was also an interviewer and presenter on WWF programming in 1993 and 1994. He also did English play-by-play for the international version of Superstars in 1998.

Rougeau came out of retirement on August 8, 1996, to face Owen Hart in a boxing match at the Montreal Molson Centre during a WWF house show despite not being active as a competitor for years.

Rougeau came out of retirement again in March 1998, when he teamed with Jacques and Carl Ouellet to defeat Adam Copeland, Shawn Stasiak and Tom Brandi in a dark match for WWF Shotgun Saturday Night.

In 2000, Rougeau participated in the "Lutte 2000" event, where he defeated Richard Charland.

Rougeau left the WWF in early 2002 when it stopped producing French-language versions of its programming.

=== Return to WWE (2017–2021) ===
In May 2017, it was announced that Rougeau would return to WWE as a French language commentator, reuniting with Jean Brassard, for the PPVs on the WWE Network.

In April 2021, after Peacock became the new home for WWE Network, due to rescheduling, Rougeau and Brassard didn't continue providing their services, leaving the company again.

=== All Elite Wrestling (2026) ===
On July 26, 2026, The Rougeau's made an appearance at AEW Redemption, being honored in Montreal.

== Political career ==
Rougeau owned income management properties and has been active in city council politics in Rawdon, Quebec since 2002; he was initially elected with 72% of the vote and was re-elected unopposed. He was elected for the first time in the November 2002 municipal election and is reelected in 2005, 2009 and 2013. Opposed by two candidates, he was reelected with 66,12% of the vote in November 2013. He occasionally promotes wrestling shows in Montreal along with Jacques. In 2021, he was elected Mayor of Rawdon with 61% of the vote. In November 2025, Rougeau would be re-elected to his second term as Mayor of Rawdon with 59.1% of the vote.

== Personal life ==
Rougeau has a son who was born in 1990.

In September 2011, Rougeau was credited with saving the life of a 77-year-old hunting friend who was lost in the woods, near Lac-Saint-Jean, Quebec for two days. Rougeau flew his own plane for the rescue mission after a police search did not lead to the man being found.

== Championships and accomplishments ==
- International Wrestling Association
  - IWA International Junior Heavyweight Championship (1 time)
- Lutte Internationale
  - Canadian International Tag Team Championship (6 times) – with Jacques Rougeau (4), and Pat Patterson (2)
- Lutte Internationale 2000
  - Lutte 2000 Championship (1 time)
  - Johnny Rougeau Tag Team Championship (1 Time) – with Jacques Rougeau
- National Wrestling Alliance
  - NWA Montreal Junior Heavyweight Championship (1 time)
- National Wrestling Federation
  - NWF World Junior Heavyweight Championship (1 time)
  - NWF World Junior Heavyweight Championship Tournament (1973)
- Pro Wrestling Illustrated
  - PWI ranked him 291 of the 500 best singles wrestlers of the PWI 500 in 1994
