= 1988 in professional wrestling =

1988 in professional wrestling describes the year's events in the world of professional wrestling.

== List of notable promotions ==
These promotions held notable events in 1988.

Promotion Name	Abbreviation	Notes
All Japan Pro Wrestling	AJPW	
American Wrestling Association	AWA	
Empresa Mexicana de Lucha Libre	EMLL	
Jim Crockett Promotions	JCP	In November, Turner Broadcasting System bought JCP and rebranded it as World Championship Wrestling (WCW).
New Japan Pro Wrestling	NJPW	
World Class Championship Wrestling	WCCW	
World Wrestling Council	WWC	
World Wrestling Federation	WWF	

== Calendar of notable shows ==
Date	Promotion(s)	Event	Location	Main Event
January 24	JCP	Bunkhouse Stampede	Uniondale, New York	Dusty Rhodes defeated Arn Anderson, The Barbarian, Ivan Koloff, Lex Luger, Road Warrior Animal, Tully Blanchard and The Warlord in a steel cage Bunkhouse Stampede
January 24	WWF	Royal Rumble	Hamilton, Ontario	Jim Duggan won the Royal Rumble by last eliminating One Man Gang
February 21	AJW	The War Dream II	Kawasaki, Japan	Dump Matsumoto and Yukari Omori retire. The show featured Matsumoto facing partner Bull Nakano, Yukari Omori facing Lioness Asuka and a special exhibition match where long-time rivals Chigusa Nagayo and Matsumoto teamed up against Asuka and Omori.
March 7	WWF	Saturday Night's Main Event	Nashville, Tennessee	Hulk Hogan defeated Harley Race in a singles match
March 27	WWF	WrestleMania IV	Atlantic City, New Jersey	Randy Savage defeated Ted DiBiase in a tournament final for the vacant WWF World Heavyweight Championship
March 27	JCP	Clash of the Champions I	Greensboro, North Carolina	Ric Flair (c) wrestled Sting to a time-limit draw in a singles match for the NWA World Heavyweight Championship
April 22	WWF	Saturday Night's Main Event	Springfield, Massachusetts	Randy Savage (c) defeated One Man Gang in a singles match for the WWF World Heavyweight Championship
April 22; April 23	JCP	3rd Annual Jim Crockett Sr. Memorial Cup Tag Team Tournament	Greenville, South Carolina; Greensboro, North Carolina	Sting and Lex Luger defeated Arn Anderson and Tully Blanchard in a tournament final
May 8	WCCW	5th Von Erich Memorial Parade of Champions	Irving, Texas	Kerry Von Erich defeated Iceman Parsons (c) in a singles match for the WCWA World Heavyweight Championship
June 8	JCP	Clash of the Champions II	Miami, Florida	Arn Anderson and Tully Blanchard (c) vs. Sting and Dusty Rhodes ended in a double disqualification in a tag team match for the NWA World Tag Team Championship
June 12	NJPW	G1 Climax	Tokyo, Japan	Antonio Inoki won the 5-man round-robin block to claim victory.
June 28	AJW	Japan Grand Prix	Tokyo, Japan	Bull Nakano defeated Yumiko Hotta in the finals
July 10	JCP	The Great American Bash	Baltimore, Maryland	Ric Flair (c) defeated Lex Luger in a singles match for the NWA World Heavyweight Championship
July 30	JCP; AWA; WCCW	Second Annual Eddie Graham Memorial Show	Tampa, Florida	Kerry Von Erich (C - WCCW) defeated Jerry Lawler (C - AWA) in a singles match; AWA World Heavyweight Championship vs. WCCW World Heavyweight Championship
August 29	AJPW	Bruiser Brody Memorial Show	Tokyo, Japan	Genichiro Tenryu and Ashura Hara defeated Jumbo Tsuruta and Yoshiaki Yatsu in a tag team match for the World Tag Team Championship
August 29	WWF	SummerSlam	New York City, New York	The Mega Powers (Hulk Hogan and Randy Savage) defeated The Mega Bucks (André the Giant and Ted DiBiase) in a tag team match with Jesse Ventura as the special guest referee
September 7	JCP	Clash of the Champions III: Fall Brawl	Albany, Georgia	Sting defeated Barry Windham (c) by disqualification in a Singles match for the NWA United States Championship
September 10	WWC	WWC 15th Aniversario	Bayamón, Puerto Rico	Huracan Castillo and Miguel Pérez Jr. defeated Bobby Jaggers and Dan Kroffat in a "Hair vs. hair" tag team match
September 30	EMLL	EMLL 55th Anniversary Show	Mexico City, Mexico	Máscara Año 2000 defeated Mogur in a Lucha de Apuestas mask vs. mask match
October 11	AJW	Tag League the Best	Tokyo, Japan	The Crush Gals (Chigusa Nagayo and Lioness Asuka) defeated Bull Nakano and Condor Saito
October 15	WCCW	5th Cotton Bowl Extravaganza	Dallas, Texas	Kerry Von Erich (c - WCWA) defeated Jerry Lawler (c - AWA) in a Texas Death match for the WCWA World Heavyweight Championship and the AWA World Heavyweight Championship
October 16	WWF	King of the Ring	Providence, Rhode Island	Ted DiBiase defeated Randy Savage by count-out in a King of the Ring tournament final match
October 25	WWF	Saturday Night's Main Event	Baltimore, Maryland	Hulk Hogan defeated King Haku in a singles match
November 16	WWF	Saturday Night's Main Event	Sacramento, California	Randy Savage (c) vs. Andre the Giant in a singles match for the WWF World Heavyweight Championship ended in a double disqualification
November 24	WWF	Survivor Series	Richfield Township, Ohio	Hercules, Hillbilly Jim, Koko B. Ware, Hulk Hogan and Randy Savage defeated Akeem, Big Boss Man, Haku, The Red Rooster and Ted DiBiase in a 5-on-5 Survivor Series match
December 7	NJPW	Japan Cup Tag League	Tokyo, Japan	Tatsumi Fujinami and Kengo Kimura defeated Antonio Inoki and Dick Murdoch
December 7	WCW	Clash of the Champions IV: Season's Beatings	Chattanooga, Tennessee	Ric Flair and Barry Windham defeated The Midnight Express (Bobby Eaton and Stan Lane) in a tag team match
December 7	WWF	Saturday Night's Main Event	Tampa, Florida	Hulk Hogan defeated Akeem in a singles match
December 13	AWA	SuperClash III	Chicago, Illinois	Jerry Lawler (c - AWA) defeated Kerry Von Erich (c - WCCW) in a AWA World Heavyweight Championship/WCWA World Heavyweight Championship title unification match
December 26	WCW	Starrcade	Norfolk, Virginia	Junkyard Dog won by last eliminating Abdullah the Butcher in a 17-Man $50,000 Bunkhouse Battle Royal
(c) – denotes defending champion(s)

== Notable events ==
- January 24 - WWE Royal Rumble was aired on USA Network against the NWA Bunkhouse Stampede that aired live on Pay Per View.
- March 27 - Clash of the Champions I was aired on free TV via TBS against the WWE pay-per view event WrestleMania IV.
- April 3 - WCW Main Event Premiered on TBS.
- July 16 - Bruiser Brody was stabbed by Jose Huertas Gonzalez before a WWC live event in Bayamon, Puerto Rico. Brody died hours later in a local hospital.
- November 1 - Turner Broadcasting Systems purchased Jim Crockett Promotions the biggest National Wrestling Alliance territory.
- November - Jerry Jarrett buys 50 percent of WCWA from Ken Mantell
- December 13 - AWA World Heavyweight Champion Jerry Lawler defeated WCWA World Heavyweight Champion Kerry Von Erich in Chicago, Illinois at AWA Superclash III to unify both the AWA and WCWA World titles.

== Tournaments and accomplishments ==
=== AJW ===
Accomplishment	Winner	Date won	Notes
Japan Grand Prix 1988	Bull Nakano	June 26	
Rookie of the Year Decision Tournament	Sachiko Nakamura		
Tag League The Best 1988	Hisako Uno and Mika Suzuki	October 10	

=== JCP ===
Accomplishment	Winner	Date won	Notes
Bunkhouse Stampede	Dusty Rhodes	January 24	
Jim Crockett Sr. Memorial Cup Tag Team Tournament	Lex Luger and Sting	April 23	
NWA United States Tag Team Championship Tournament	The Fantastics(Bobby Fulton and Tommy Rogers)	April 26	

=== WWF ===
Accomplishment	Winner	Date won	Notes
Royal Rumble	Jim Duggan	January 24	
WWF World Heavyweight Championship Tournament	Randy Savage	March 27	
King of the Ring	Ted DiBiase	October 16	

== Awards and honors ==
=== Pro Wrestling Illustrated ===
Category	Winner
PWI Wrestler of the Year	Randy Savage
PWI Tag Team of the Year	The Road Warriors (Hawk and Animal)
PWI Match of the Year	Hulk Hogan vs. André the Giant (The Main Event I)
PWI Feud of the Year	Ric Flair vs. Lex Luger
PWI Most Popular Wrestler of the Year	Randy Savage
PWI Most Hated Wrestler of the Year	André the Giant
PWI Most Improved Wrestler of the Year	Sting
PWI Most Inspirational Wrestler of the Year	Jerry Lawler
PWI Rookie of the Year	Madusa Miceli
PWI Lifetime Achievement	Bruiser Brody, Adrian Adonis
PWI Editor's Award	J. J. Dillon

=== Wrestling Observer Newsletter ===
Category	Winner
Wrestler of the Year	Akira Maeda
Most Outstanding	Tatsumi Fujinami
Feud of the Year	The Fantastics vs. The Midnight Express
Tag Team of the Year	The Midnight Express (Bobby Eaton and Stan Lane)
Most Improved	Sting
Best on Interviews	Jim Cornette

== Title changes ==
=== WWF ===
WWF World Heavyweight Championship
Incoming champion – Hulk Hogan
Date	Winner	Event/Show	Note(s)
February 5	Andre the Giant	The Main Event I	After the controversial finish, Andre "sold' his title to Ted Dibiase
February 5	Vacant	The Main Event I	As a result of that moment see above Jack Tunney declared the title vacant.
March 27	Randy Savage	WrestleMania IV	It was a 14-man tournament to decide the undisputed WWE Champion.

WWF Intercontinental Championship
Incoming champion – The Honky Tonk Man
Date	Winner	Event/Show	Note(s)
August 29	The Ultimate Warrior	SummerSlam	The Ultimate Warrior was a last minute replacement for Brutus Beefcake who was originally the no. 1 contender for the title.

WWF World Martial Arts Heavyweight Championship
Incoming champion – Antonio Inoki
Date	Winner	Event/Show	Note(s)
No title changes

WWF Women's Tag Team Championship
Incoming champions – The Glamour Girls (Leilani Kai and Judy Martin)
Date	Winner	Event/Show	Note(s)
January 24	The Jumping Bomb Angels (Noriyo Tateno and Itzuki Yamazaki)	Royal Rumble	
June 8	The Glamour Girls (Leilani Kai and Judy Martin)	Live event	

WWF Women's Championship
Incoming champion – Sensational Sherri
Date	Winner	Event/Show	Note(s)
October 7	Rockin' Robin	Prime Time Wrestling	

WWF Tag Team Championship
Incoming champions – Strike Force (Rick Martel and Tito Santana)
Date	Winner	Event/Show	Note(s)
March 27	Demolition (Ax and Smash)	WrestleMania IV	

== Births ==
- January 15 – Eddie Hall
- January 16 – Bull Dempsey
- January 19
  - Tyler Breeze
  - Wardlow (wrestler)
- February 26 – Reid Flair (d. 2013)
- March 10 - Alex Reynolds
- March 11 – Katsuhiko Nakajima
- March 16 – Brett DiBiase
- March 18 – Vanessa Borne
- March 20 - Jonathan Gresham
- March 22
  - Tam Nakano
  - Yoshikazu Yokoyama
- April 14 - Marina Shafir
- April 17 – Dasha Fuentes
- May 1 - Joe Hendry
- May 5 – Brooke Hogan
- May 6 – Dakota Kai
- May 20 – Lacey Lane
- May 22 – Santana Garrett
- May 25 - Bronson Reed
- May 26 – Babatunde Aiyegbusi
- May 30 – No Way Jose
- June 1 – Ross Von Erich
- June 2 – Grado
- June 11 - Hikaru Shida
- June 19 – Daga
- June 25 – Mark Haskins
- July 6 – Lars Sullivan
- July 12 – Paul Robinson
- July 18 - RJ City
- July 26 – Marty Scurll
- August 5 – Shane Mercer
- August 6 - Dan Matha
- August 7 – Marti Belle
- August 8 – Veer Mahaan
- August 12 – Tyson Fury
- August 29 – Kevin Ku
- August 31 – Ember Moon
- September 13 – Markus Crane (died in 2021)
- September 21 – Tom MacDonald
- September 23 – Kairi Hojo
- September 26 – Buddy Murphy
- September 27 – Cathy Kelley
- September 28 – Jason Jordan
- September 29 - Rush (wrestler)
- October 11 – Ricochet
- October 26 – Ayumu Honda
- November 2 – Dezmond Xavier
- November 3 – Gran Metalik
- November 24 – Anthony Ogogo
- November 29 – Dana Brooke

== Debuts ==
=== Debut date ===
- January 2 - Akira Taue and Gary Wolfe
- January 10 - Yukari Osawa (JWP)
- February 4 - Super Crazy
- February 14 - Heavy Metal
- February 20 - Raven
- February 26 - Kenta Kobashi and Tsuyoshi Kikuchi
- March 10 - Misterioso
- March 23 - Jerry Lynn
- April 8 - Koki Kitahara
- April 22 - Bart Sawyer
- June 23 - Minoru Suzuki
- June 28 - Ricky Fuji
- August 16 - Gangrel
- September 11 - Bobby Blaze
- September 13 - Dustin Runnels
- October 10 - Takako Inoue, Kyoko Inoue and Mariko Yoshida
- December 4 - Apolo Dantés

=== Uncertain debut date ===
- Perry Saturn
- Brad Anderson
- Brian Christopher
- Brian Lee
- Mr. Hughes
- The Patriot
- J. C. Ice
- John Rambo
- KeMonito
- Killer Kyle
- El Alebrije
- Lou Perez
- Louie Spicolli
- Magnificent Mimi
- Mephisto
- Mike Enos
- Tiffany Mellon
- Tori
- Roxy Astor
- Wayne Bloom
- Luther Biggs
- Rick Bognar
- Rod Price

== Retirements ==
- Alexis Smirnoff (1970 - 1988)
- Rufus R. Jones (1969 - 1988)
- The Crusher (1949 - 1988)
- Emile Dupree (1955 - 1988)
- Mr. Hito (June 8, 1967 - March 25, 1988)
- Shunji Kosugi (1981-April 10, 1988, returned for one last match in 2010)
- Winona Littleheart (1977 - 1988)
- Jody Hamilton (1955 - 1988)
- John Quinn (1961 - 1988)
- Outback Jack (1986 - 1988)
- Scott McGhee (1978 - January 1988)
- Buddy Roberts (1965 - 1988)

== Deaths ==
- March 14 - Saul Weingeroff, 72
- March 30 - Stu Gibson, 62
- April 30
  - Man Mountain Mike, 47
  - Tiger Joe Tomasso, 65/66
- May 15 - Fred Atkins, 77/78
- June 15 - Mike Clancy, 63
- July 4:
  - Adrian Adonis, 33
  - Dave McKigney, 56
  - Mike Kelly, 40
- July 17 - Bruiser Brody, 42
- September 6 - Leroy Brown, 37
- September 9 - Leroy McGuirk, 77
- November 26 - Baron Michele Leone, 79
- November 30 - Ricky Lawless, 28
- December 12 - Larry Moquin, 65
- December 21 - Dave Ruhl, 68

== See also ==
- List of WCW pay-per-view events
- List of WWF pay-per-view events
