= Royal Rumble (1988) =

World Wrestling Federation television special

- The 1988 Royal Rumble logo
- Promotion: World Wrestling Federation
- Date: January 24, 1988
- City: Hamilton, Ontario, Canada
- Venue: Copps Coliseum
- Attendance: 18,000
- Tagline: For The First Time Ever on USA

Royal Rumble chronology
← Previous; First	Next → 1989

Television special chronology
← Previous; Saturday Night's Main Event XIV	Next → The Main Event

WWE in Canada chronology
← Previous —	Next → WrestleMania VI

The 1988 Royal Rumble was a professional wrestling television special produced by the American promotion World Wrestling Federation (WWF, renamed WWE in 2002). It was the inaugural Royal Rumble event and took place on January 24, 1988, at the Copps Coliseum in Hamilton, Ontario, Canada. The event aired live on the USA Network on the same night as Jim Crockett Promotions's Bunkhouse Stampede pay-per-view (PPV) event. It centered on the men's Royal Rumble match, a modified battle royal in which the participants enter at timed intervals instead of all beginning in the ring at the same time. The match, however, was not the main event (final match).

This would be the only Royal Rumble event to broadcast as a television special, as beginning with the 1989 event, it began airing on pay-per-view. After the launch of the WWE Network in 2014, this inaugural Royal Rumble was included with the rest of the Royal Rumble events in the PPV section. It was also the only Royal Rumble event to be held outside the United States until 2026 in Saudi Arabia.

Four matches were contested at the event. The main event was a two out of three falls match in which The Islanders (Haku and Tama) defeated The Young Stallions (Paul Roma and Jim Powers). The main match on the undercard was the first-ever televised Royal Rumble match, which had 20 participants and was won by Jim Duggan, who last eliminated One Man Gang. Additionally, The Jumping Bomb Angels (Noriyo Tateno and Itsuki Yamazaki) defeated The Glamour Girls (Judy Martin and Leilani Kai) in a two out of three falls match to win the WWF Women's Tag Team Championship, and in the opening bout, Ricky Steamboat defeated Rick Rude by disqualification.

== Production ==
=== Background ===
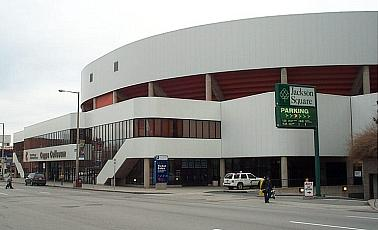
The inaugural Royal Rumble event was held at the Copps Coliseum in Hamilton, Ontario, Canada.

The idea for a men's Royal Rumble match was constructed by wrestler Pat Patterson. The rules were that each wrestler had to draw a number between 1 and 20, ostensibly at random. The #1 and #2 entrants would begin the match while the other participants would join the match every two minutes thereafter. Like a standard battle royal, participants had to eliminate their opponents by tossing them over the top rope with both feet touching the floor. The winner would be the last wrestler remaining after all others had been eliminated.

The first experimental Royal Rumble match happened at a World Wrestling Federation (WWF, renamed WWE in 2002) house show on October 4, 1987, at the Kiel Auditorium in St. Louis, Missouri. It was a 12-man match that One Man Gang won after last eliminating Junkyard Dog. Possibly because the event was not televised and a financial failure (drawing only 1,976 attendees), this event is not acknowledged by the promotion. According to Patterson, WWF Chairman Vince McMahon hated the concept from the start. Patterson was not at the 1987 show to guide the producers and the wrestlers. He said they had gotten the match concept mixed up. The original prize was a WWF World Heavyweight Championship match against Hulk Hogan at the next St. Louis event scheduled for November 17, 1987; however, the ring announcer spoiled the Rumble result by announcing beforehand that One Man Gang would be Hogan's challenger at that following event.

The WWF then had a live television special scheduled to air on the USA Network on January 24, 1988, emanating from the Copps Coliseum in Hamilton, Ontario, Canada. Saturday Night Live's executive producer Dick Ebersol, who worked with McMahon on the Saturday Night's Main Event shows, was in charge of producing the special. Ebersol was unsatisfied with the event's planned card, and McMahon suggested Patterson to tell Ebersol about his Royal Rumble concept, which Ebersol thought was the "greatest thing for television". Patterson said that Ebersol saw the potential of the match, and Ebersol came up with the idea to add a countdown clock on the TV to build anticipation for the next entrant. Ebersol's endorsement was enough to convince McMahon to have the match as the centerpiece of the special, and the special was in turn titled after the match. The number of participants for the match was also increased to 20, but with no prize attached to the match.

=== Storylines ===
The event comprised four matches that resulted from scripted storylines. Results were predetermined by WWF's writers, while storylines were produced on WWF's weekly television shows, Superstars, Wrestling Challenge, and Prime Time Wrestling.

The Jumping Bomb Angels (Noriyo Tateno and Itsuki Yamazaki) feuded with The Glamour Girls (Leilani Kai & Judy Martin) over the WWF Women's Tag Team Championship. Kai & Martin were awarded the titles in August 1985 in Egypt. Kai & Martin feuded with many tag teams and held onto the titles for over two and a half years. In November 1987, they began calling themselves "The Glamour Girls". At Survivor Series 1987, The Glamour Girls were part of WWF Women's Champion Sensational Sherri's team in a Survivor Series match against Fabulous Moolah's team. The Jumping Bomb Angels, part of Moolah's team pinned the champions to become the survivors for the match. After pinning the champions, The Jumping Bomb Angels signed a contract for the Royal Rumble challenging The Glamour Girls for the titles.

== Event ==
Other on-screen personnel
Role:	Name:
Commentator	Vince McMahon
Commentator	Jesse Ventura
Interviewer	Gene Okerlund
Interviewer	Craig DeGeorge
Ring Announcer	Howard Finkel
President	Jack Tunney
Referees	Dave Hebner
Referees	Earl Hebner
Referees	Jim Korderas
Referees	Joey Marella

The first match was between Rick Rude and Ricky Steamboat. At the conclusion of the match, Steamboat attempted a diving crossbody, but Rude pulled referee Dave Hebner in front of him to avoid any contact unto himself. Rude placed Steamboat in a Canadian backbreaker rack, but Hebner signaled for the bell. Rude reacted as if Hebner was awarding him the match via a submission, but in fact, Hebner instead awarded the bout to Steamboat via a disqualification.

Dino Bravo attempted to set a world record to bench press 715 pounds. He was successful, but with help from spotter Jesse "The Body" Ventura.

The second match was a women's tag team two out of three falls match for the WWF Women's Tag Team Championship, as the champions The Glamour Girls (Judy Martin and Leilani Kai), defended the titles against The Jumping Bomb Angels (Noriyo Tateno and Itsuki Yamazaki). The challengers won the titles after executing a double dropkick on Martin in the third and deciding fall.

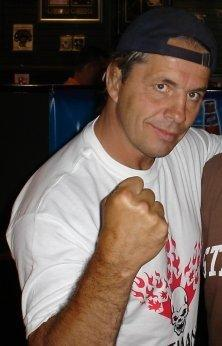
Bret Hart, the #1 entrant of the Royal Rumble match and the first wrestler ever to enter a Royal Rumble match.

André the Giant and Hulk Hogan signed a contract for a WrestleMania III rematch that took place on the February 5, 1988 The Main Event I. Tied into this was that Ted DiBiase had previously purchased André's contract from Bobby Heenan and promised André, should he defeat Hogan for the WWF Championship and then "deliver it" to him, that he would reward André with a large sum of money. During the in-ring promo, after he signed the contract, at DiBiase's prompting to "give your stamp of approval", André grabbed Hogan, slammed his head into the table and then tipped the table on top of him before the heels left the ring.

Next was the match the event was based on – the Royal Rumble match. The first two wrestlers ever to enter a Royal Rumble match were Bret Hart of The Hart Foundation and one half of WWF Tag Team Champions Strike Force, Tito Santana. Hart hit Santana in the corner. Santana fired back, but Hart hit him an inverted atomic drop, followed by a middle rope axe handle elbow drop. Butch Reed entered at #3 while Santana hit a flying forearm smash on Hart. Reed began nailing Santana until Santana dropkicked both Hart and Reed. However, the two men got the better of Santana. Reed tried to hit Santana who sidestepped, and Hart was accidentally nailed until Hart's tag team partner Jim Neidhart entered at #4. He helped Reed and his tag team partner Hart in attempting to eliminate Santana. Santana held on to ropes until Jake Roberts entered at #5, making the save for Santana. He tossed Reed out of the ring and eliminated him in the first elimination in the Royal Rumble history. He began pounding on Hart Foundation. Santana and Roberts tried to hit a Double DDT on Hart, but Neidhart attacked both men, saving his partner. Hart hit a jumping piledriver on Santana while Harley Race entered at #6. Neidhart and Race tried to eliminate Roberts while Santana nearly tossed Hart. Jim Brunzell entered at #7 and almost eliminated Hart before Neidhart attacked Brunzell, saving Hart again. Sam Houston entered at #8 and went after Hart Foundation. Tito Santana was then eliminated from the match.

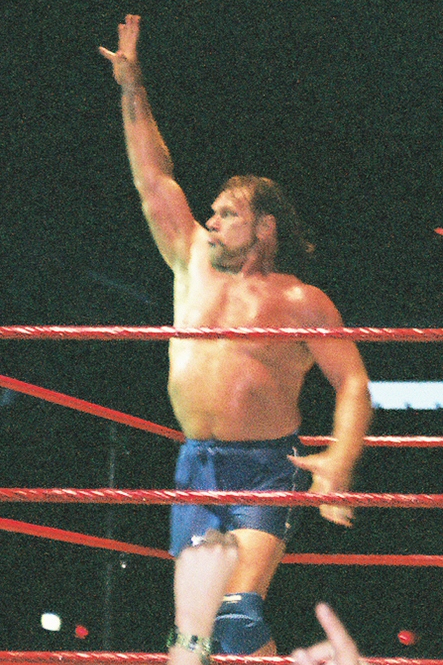
Jim Duggan, who won the Royal Rumble match.

Danny Davis entered at #9 and began attacking Houston. Race attacked Roberts through the ropes. Roberts tried to hit a DDT on Davis, but Davis blocked it. Boris Zhukov entered at #10. Zhukov's The Bolsheviks tag team partner Nikolai Volkoff and Don Muraco were quarreling over who was #11. The referees informed them that Muraco was #11 and Volkoff was #12. Zhukov was eliminated by Roberts and Brunzell. Brunzell dropkicked Hart, but it had no great effect on Hart. Volkoff entered at #12 as Muraco clotheslined Race. Jim Duggan entered at #13 and received a positive reaction from the Canadian fans. All the wrestlers continued to beat each other until Ron Bass entered at #14. Volkoff prevented Brunzell from eliminating Davis. Brunzell pounded on Volkoff, but was thrown out by Volkoff. B. Brian Blair entered at #15. Hillbilly Jim entered at #16 and eliminated Neidhart. Dino Bravo entered at #17. Bass had Houston on his shoulders and he threw Houston over the top rope, thus eliminating Houston in the process. Ultimate Warrior entered at #18 as Muraco eliminated Bret Hart. Though Hart did not win the match, he set the first Royal Rumble longevity record for being eliminated at 25:42. The One Man Gang entered at #19 and he eliminated Blair and then Roberts. The final participant entering at #20 was the Junkyard Dog. Duggan tossed Volkoff out of the ring while on the other side of the ring, the One Man Gang eliminated Hillbilly Jim and later Ultimate Warrior. Bass surprisingly attacked the Junkyard Dog and eliminated him from behind while Muraco surprisingly clotheslined Bass over the top rope as the final four left – Muraco, Duggan, Bravo and OMG. The One Man Gang nailed Duggan with a big splash in the corner and then the One Man Gang and Bravo began double-teaming on Muraco. Muraco managed to control both men until Frenchy Martin came out and distracted Muraco. Bravo and the One Man Gang were able to eliminate him. They went on to do the same to Duggan. The One Man Gang attacked him but Duggan ducked and the One Man Gang accidentally eliminated Bravo. After a brawl with One Man Gang, Duggan eliminated him to become the first-ever Royal Rumble winner.

A two out of three falls match between The Islanders (Haku and Tama) and The Young Stallions (Paul Roma and Jim Powers) closed the broadcast. The first fall concluded when Roma was tossed over the top rope by Tama – the ropes were low bridged by Haku – resulting in Roma injuring his knee. Roma was unable to return to the ring and got counted-out, giving the first fall to The Islanders. Powers worked much of the second fall, with Roma ailing on the ring apron, but eventually gave way to Roma after a taking a lengthy beating. Roma reluctantly tagged himself in but became an immediate victim to a Tama splash onto his injured knee. Haku then forced Roma to submit with a half crab to win the match in two straight falls.

== Aftermath ==
Hulk Hogan and André the Giant battled in their WrestleMania III rematch for the WWF Championship on February 5, 1988 at The Main Event I, where André controversially defeated Hogan for the WWF title. André sold the title to Ted DiBiase in exchange for a large sum of money, but figurehead WWF President Jack Tunney vacated the title, making André the shortest reigning WWF Champion (at the time) with a reign of 45 seconds. An undisputed champion was crowned in a 14-man tournament at WrestleMania IV, where Randy Savage defeated DiBiase in the final match to become the new titleholder.

This Royal Rumble set a record for the highest viewed wrestling program on cable TV at the time with an 8.2 rating.

Beginning with the 1989 Royal Rumble, the Royal Rumble became an annual pay-per-view for the WWF, which, in 2002, was renamed to World Wrestling Entertainment (WWE, which became an orphaned initialism in April 2011). The 1989 event also began the tradition of having 30 wrestlers in the titular match (with the exception of the 2011 event, which had 40). Beginning with the 1993 event, the winner traditionally earns a world championship match at that year's WrestleMania. The 2016 event was unique because the champion defended the title in the match. While originally only contested by men (with the exception of Chyna, who took part in the 1999 and 2000 events, Beth Phoenix in 2010, Kharma in 2012, and Nia Jax in 2019), a women's version was introduced at the 2018 event, and the event now features a men's and women's match. Beginning with the pay-per-view broadcast in 1989, the Royal Rumble became one of the promotion's original four pay-per-views, along with WrestleMania, SummerSlam, and Survivor Series, referred to as the "Big Four". From 1993 to 2002, these four were referred to as the "Big Five" along with King of the Ring, but that event was discontinued as an annual PPV after its 2002 event. In August 2021, Money in the Bank became recognized as one of the "Big Five". The event continued to be held in January every year except for 2025, which was held in February. This edition of the Royal Rumble would be the only event to be held outside the United States as the events beginning with the 1989 edition would be held in the U.S. until the 2026 event, which was held in Saudi Arabia.

== Results ==
No.	Results	Stipulations	Times
1	Ricky Steamboat defeated Rick Rude by disqualification	Singles match	17:39
2	The Jumping Bomb Angels (Noriyo Tateno and Itsuki Yamazaki) defeated The Glamour Girls (Judy Martin and Leilani Kai) (c) (with Jimmy Hart) 2-1	Two out of three falls match for the WWF Women's Tag Team Championship	15:00
3	Jim Duggan won by last eliminating One Man Gang	20-man Royal Rumble match	33:00
4	The Islanders (Haku and Tama) defeated The Young Stallions (Paul Roma and Jim Powers) by pinfall	Two out of three falls match	14:00
(c) / – the champion(s) heading into the match

=== Royal Rumble entrances and eliminations ===
A new entrant came out approximately every two minutes.

Draw	Entrant	Order	Eliminated by	Time	Eliminations
1	Bret Hart	8	Don Muraco	25:42	1
2	Tito Santana	2	Bret Hart & Jim Neidhart	10:41	0
3	Butch Reed	1	Jake Roberts	03:18	0
4	Jim Neidhart	6	Hillbilly Jim	19:06	1
5	Jake Roberts	10	One Man Gang	21:52	2
6	Harley Race	4	Don Muraco	10:03	0
7	Jim Brunzell	5	Nikolai Volkoff	12:06	1
8	Sam Houston	7	Ron Bass	14:39	0
9	Danny Davis	13	Jim Duggan	17:51	0
10	Boris Zhukov	3	Jake Roberts & Jim Brunzell	02:33	0
11	Don Muraco	17	Dino Bravo & One Man Gang	16:10	3
12	Nikolai Volkoff	11	Jim Duggan	11:40	1
13	Jim Duggan	-	Winner	14:43	3
14	Ron Bass	16	Don Muraco	10:14	2
15	B. Brian Blair	9	One Man Gang	05:50	0
16	Hillbilly Jim	12	One Man Gang	05:55	1
17	Dino Bravo	18	One Man Gang	08:12	2
18	Ultimate Warrior	14	Dino Bravo & One Man Gang	03:51	0
19	One Man Gang	19	Jim Duggan	06:50	6
20	Junkyard Dog	15	Ron Bass	02:30	0

=== References ===
- Brian Shields (2006). "Supercard/PPV History". Main event–WWE in the raging 80s (4th ed.). Pocket Books. pp. 166–168. ISBN 978-1-4165-3257-6.
- "2007 Pro Wrestling Illustrated Almanac & Book of Facts". Wrestling's historical cards. Kappa Publishing. 2007. p. 86.
- onlineworldofwrestling.com – Royal Rumble '88 results
- twnpnews.com – Royal Rumble
