= Dawn Marie (wrestler, fl. 1980s) =

American professional wrestler

Dawn Marie Johnston
Personal information
- Born: c. 1948

Professional wrestling career
- Ring name: Dawn Marie
- Billed weight: 150 lb (68 kg)
- Billed from: Newington, Connecticut

Dawn Marie Johnston is a former professional wrestler, better known by her ring name, Dawn Marie. She was active in the 1980s and early 1990s. She wrestled primarily in Japan, National Wrestling Federation (NWF), World Wrestling Federation (WWF), and Ladies Professional Wrestling Association (LPWA).

== Professional wrestling career ==
In a six-woman match in Japan during the summer of 1985, Johnston teamed with Desiree Petersen and Dump Matsumoto against Jaguar Yokota (Rimi Yokota) and the Jumping Bomb Angels (Noriyo Tateno and Itsuki Yamazaki). The heels controlled from the get go due to a sneak attack before the bell. The faces just made brief comebacks during the first 12 minutes. Dump won the match for her team.

In March 1986, she wrestled for the World Wrestling Federation (WWF) at the Boston Garden, teaming with Velvet McIntyre against Bull Nakano and Dump Masamoto. She also wrestled as a part of Sensational Sherri's team at the Survivor Series in 1987.

During the early 1990s, she competed in the Ladies Professional Wrestling Association (LPWA) and wrestled against Magnificent Mimi, Rustee "The Foxx" Thomas, Kat LeRoux, and Reggie Bennett.
