= Survivor Series (1987) =

World Wrestling Federation pay-per-view event

- VHS flyer featuring the two teams competing in the main event
- Promotion: World Wrestling Federation
- Date: November 26, 1987
- City: Richfield Township, Ohio
- Venue: Richfield Coliseum
- Attendance: 21,300
- Tagline: The Biggest Event Since WrestleMania III!

Pay-per-view chronology
← Previous; WrestleMania III	Next → WrestleMania IV

Survivor Series chronology
← Previous; First	Next → 1988

The 1987 Survivor Series was a professional wrestling pay-per-view (PPV) event produced by the World Wrestling Federation (WWF, renamed WWE in 2002). It was the inaugural Survivor Series event and took place on Thanksgiving Day in the United States on Thursday, November 26, 1987, and was held at the Richfield Coliseum in Richfield Township, Ohio. It was one of the first four annual pay-per-view events produced by the WWF, along with WrestleMania, introduced in 1985, and Royal Rumble and SummerSlam, introduced in 1988, (Note: Royal Rumble was originally a television special in 1988 before it became an annual pay-per-view event beginning in 1989.) later referred to as the "Big Four".

The event was named after and centered on the Survivor Series match, a tag team elimination match that pits teams of multiple wrestlers against each other, or also multiple individual tag teams against each other. Each member of a team has to be eliminated individually until all members of a team have been eliminated, or in the case of a Survivor Series match composed of multiple individual tag teams, only one member of an individual tag team has to be eliminated for that individual tag team to be eliminated from the Survivor Series team. Every match on the card at the 1987 event was held as a Survivor Series match for both men and women.

In the main event, André the Giant's team defeated Hulk Hogan's team when André last eliminated Hogan's team member Bam Bam Bigelow to become the first lone survivor in the history of Survivor Series. On the undercard, Macho Man Randy Savage's team defeated The Honky Tonk Man's team and The Fabulous Moolah's team defeated Sensational Sherri's team. The event also featured a 10-man tag team elimination match in which Strike Force (Rick Martel and Tito Santana) and their teammates defeated The Hart Foundation's (Bret Hart and Jim Neidhart) team.

== Production ==
=== Background ===
The inaugural Survivor Series was held at the Richfield Coliseum in Richfield Township, Ohio.

Following WrestleMania III, the professional wrestling promotion World Wrestling Federation (WWF, renamed WWE in 2002) added an event titled Survivor Series to its pay-per-view (PPV) calendar in November to market the success of Hulk Hogan and André the Giant's rivalry. It was scheduled to be held on Thanksgiving Day in the United States on Thursday, November 26, 1987, at the Richfield Coliseum in Richfield Township, Ohio. The event was characterized by featuring only tag team elimination matches that were named Survivor Series matches. Of the four matches at the event, three pitted teams of five wrestlers against each other, while the other featured five tag teams against each other (totaling 10 wrestlers per team), but with the stipulation being that if one member of a tag team was eliminated, both members of that particular tag team were eliminated.

WWF Chief Executive Officer and Chairman Vince McMahon threatened cable companies who aired the National Wrestling Alliance's Starrcade (which was going head-to-head with Survivor Series on Thanksgiving night, 1987) instead of Survivor Series would not be allowed to broadcast WrestleMania IV. Most cable providers gave into McMahon's threat and only a handful aired Starrcade.

=== Storylines ===
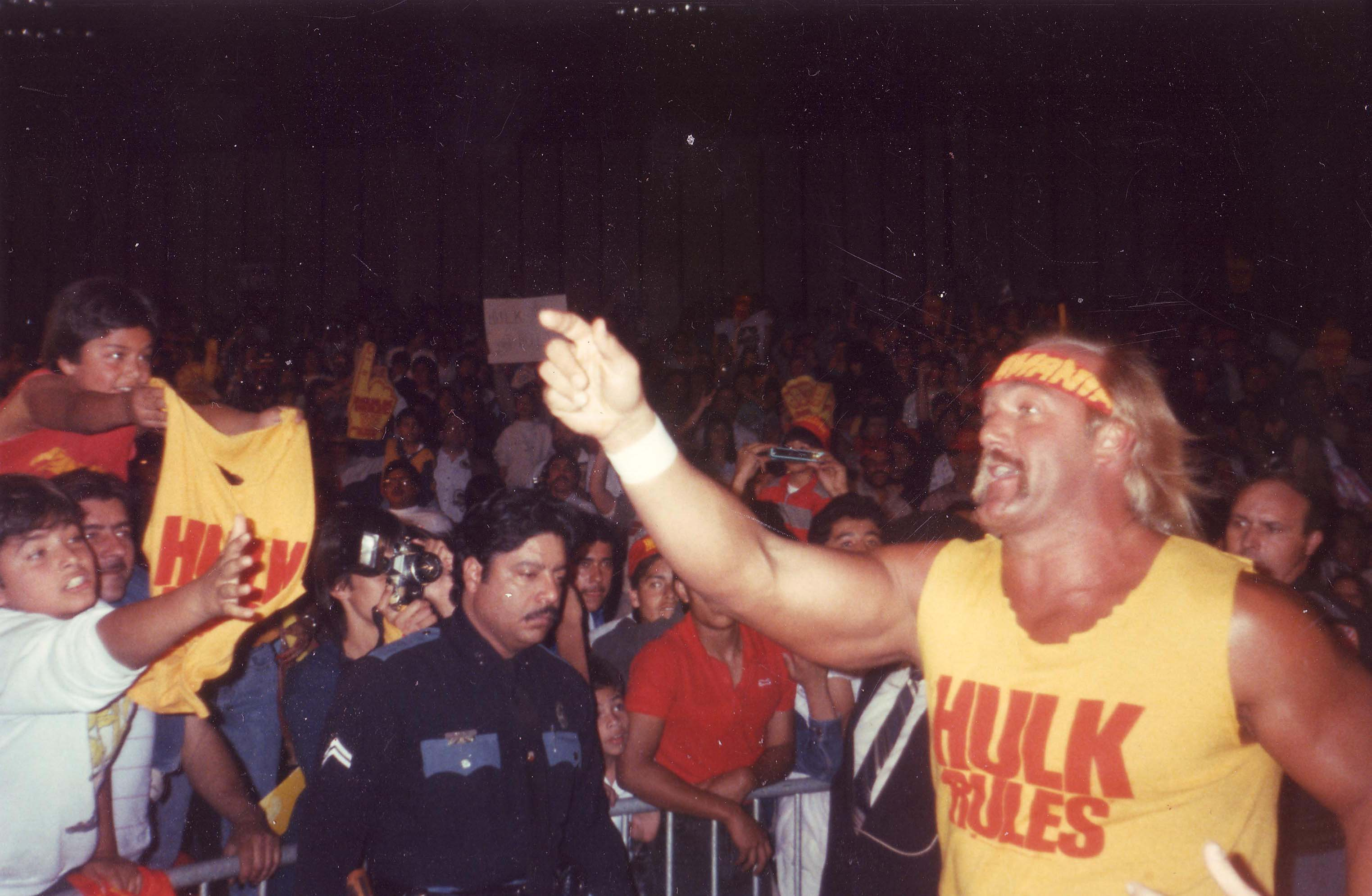
WWF World Heavyweight Champion Hulk Hogan (pictured 1989), who feuded with André the Giant

The main feud heading into Survivor Series included André the Giant, One Man Gang, King Kong Bundy, Butch Reed and Rick Rude against Hulk Hogan, Paul Orndorff, Don Muraco, Ken Patera and Bam Bam Bigelow. In January 1987, Hogan was awarded a trophy for his third year as WWF World Heavyweight Champion while Hogan's best friend André was awarded a smaller trophy than Hogan's, for being undefeated in WWF for 15 years. Hogan congratulated his friend and said that André was the real champion of superstars all around the world. André surprisingly left the interview before Hogan could even finish. In February, he came with a new manager Bobby Heenan. When Hogan learned of that, he begged André not to keep Heenan as his manager because Heenan was Hogan's longtime enemy. André said that he had come to challenge Hogan for the WWF World Heavyweight Title at WrestleMania. He ripped off Hogan's Hulkamania shirt and golden chain, turning heel. This culminated in their historic match at WrestleMania III, where Hogan defeated André to retain the title. On August 22, 1987, edition of Prime Time Wrestling, Paul Orndorff fired Bobby Heenan as his manager when he discovered that Heenan had brought in a new wrestler Rick Rude to replace Orndorff. Orndorff appointed Oliver Humperdink as his manager to feud with Rude. Superstar Billy Graham got involved in a feud with Butch Reed, culminating in a match between the duo. One Man Gang interfered in a match where he hit Graham with a big splash on the concrete floor. Don Muraco came to the rescue of Graham and Graham who was scheduled to participate in the main event of the first-ever Survivor Series retired due to an attack by One Man Gang. Muraco replaced him. Ken Patera got involved in a feud with Bobby Heenan and The Heenan Family and turned babyface, and was chosen to be the fourth member on Hogan's team. Many heel managers wanted to manage Bam Bam Bigelow, but Bigelow chose Oliver Humperdink as his manager thus making his WWF debut as a babyface. He also became a part of Hogan's team.

Randy Savage had been a heel since his WWF debut in the summer of 1985. He turned babyface in late 1987, after WWF Intercontinental Heavyweight Champion The Honky Tonk Man claimed to be the greatest Intercontinental Heavyweight Champion. This led to a feud between Savage and Honky, leading to Savage's face turn. On October 3, 1987, Saturday Night's Main Event XII, Savage challenged Honky for the title, winning by disqualification. The title remained with Honky because a title cannot change hands by a DQ. Harley Race had won the 1986 King of the Ring tournament and was so proud about this that he called himself King Harley Race and wore a crown and cape to the ring. Jim Duggan did not agree with the fact and this placed Duggan and Race into a feud, with Duggan winning most of the matches. Jake Roberts also feuded with Honky Tonk Man after Honky hit Roberts with a guitar on an edition of Snake Pit, completing Roberts' babyface turn. A match was booked for Survivor Series featuring Savage, Roberts, Ricky Steamboat (whom Honky Tonk had defeated to win the Intercontinental Heavyweight Title), Brutus Beefcake and Duggan against Honky, Hercules, Danny Davis, Ron Bass and Race.

The major ongoing tag team feud pitted the face Strike Force and the villainous Hart Foundation. Tito Santana and Rick Martel formed Strike Force in the summer of 1987 after Santana rescued Martel from a beating by The Islanders. Strike Force quickly became a top contender for the WWF Tag Team Championship, held by the Hart Foundation (Bret Hart and Jim Neidhart), and on October 28, 1987, Strike Force won the titles when Neidhart was trapped in Martel's Boston crab.

== Event ==
Other on-screen personnel
Role:	Name:
Commentator	Gorilla Monsoon
Commentator	Jesse Ventura
Interviewer	Gene Okerlund
Interviewer	Craig DeGeorge
Ring Announcer	Howard Finkel
Referees	Dave Hebner
Referees	Jack Kruger
Referees	Jim Korderas
Referees	Joey Marella

The first match of the first Survivor Series was the first Survivor Series elimination match. Randy Savage, Jake Roberts, Ricky Steamboat, Brutus Beefcake, and Jim Duggan faced The Honky Tonk Man, Hercules, Danny Davis, Ron Bass, and Harley Race. Savage's team was seconded by his wife Miss Elizabeth while Honky's team was seconded by Bobby Heenan and Jimmy Hart. Beefcake and Hercules started off before Duggan and Race were tagged in. Duggan knocked Race out of the ring and followed him out where they brawled and both men were counted out and eliminated, leaving four men on each team. Beefcake hit a high knee on Bass, and went on to eliminate him. Team captain Honky himself joined the match and hit his Shake, Rattle and Roll on Beefcake and eliminated him, evening the match at three all. Roberts hit a DDT on Davis and only two men remained in Honky's team, Honky and Hercules. Savage hit the Savage Elbow on Hercules and pinned him, leaving Honky the only member in his team. After being dominated by Savage, Roberts and Steamboat for a couple of minutes, Honky was atomic dropped over the top rope by Savage and ran from the ring with Jimmy Hart and his IC Belt and was counted out. Honky's self-elimination made Savage, Roberts and Steamboat the survivors of the match.

The next match was a women's match featuring the team of The Fabulous Moolah, Rockin' Robin, Velvet McIntyre, and The Jumping Bomb Angels (Itsuki Yamazaki and Noriyo Tateno) against Sensational Sherri, The Glamour Girls (Leilani Kai and Judy Martin), Donna Christianello, and Dawn Marie. McIntyre did the first elimination by pinning Christianello with a victory roll. Robin hit a running crossbody on Marie and pinned her with the crossbody, leading to three wrestlers on Sherri's team while none of Moolah's team members had been eliminated. Team captain Sherri came into the match and hit Robin with a vertical suplex to eliminate her. Glamour Girls hit a double clothesline on Moolah and Judy Martin, one half of Glamour Girls pinned Moolah to eliminate her. McIntyre pinned Sherri with a victory roll pin. Leilani Kai joined the match and then pinned McIntyre after an electric chair drop. Yamazaki hit a diving crossbody from the top rope on Kai and pinned her to eliminate her. Tateno hit a flying clothesline on Martin and pinned her to win the match. Jumping Bomb Angels became the survivors for Moolah's team.

The third match was a tag team variation of the Survivor Series match with 10 tag teams. If a person from a tag team was eliminated, their partner was also eliminated. The match featured Strike Force (Tito Santana and Rick Martel), The Young Stallions (Paul Roma and Jim Powers), The Fabulous Rougeaus (Jacques and Raymond Rougeau), The Killer Bees (Jim Brunzell and B. Brian Blair), and The British Bulldogs (Davey Boy Smith and Dynamite Kid) against The Hart Foundation (Bret Hart and Jim Neidhart), The Islanders (Haku and Tama), Demolition (Ax and Smash), The Bolsheviks (Nikolai Volkoff and Boris Zhukov), and The New Dream Team (Greg Valentine and Dino Bravo). Santana hit a flying forearm smash on Zhukov and pinned him to eliminate Bolsheviks for the first elimination of the match. Jacques hit a diving crossbody on Ax but missed the move and was pinned by Ax, eliminating Fabulous Rougeaus. Ax's partner Smash was disqualified for hitting referee Dave Hebner, eliminating Demolition. Neidhart pinned Santana to eliminate Strike Force and Haku pinned Dynamite Kid to eliminate British Bulldogs. Next came Roma and Valentine. Roma hit a diving sunset flip on Valentine to eliminate The New Dream Team. Bret Hart and Jim Brunzell were next. Tama dropkicked Hart and then Brunzell rolled over Hart to eliminate Hart Foundation. Brian Blair put on his Killer Bees mask and pinned Tama with a sunset flip to eliminate Islanders. As a results, Young Stallions and Killer Bees won the match and became survivors for their team.

The main event was a Survivor Series match where André the Giant, One Man Gang, King Kong Bundy, Butch Reed, and Rick Rude faced Hulk Hogan, Paul Orndorff, Don Muraco, Ken Patera, and Bam Bam Bigelow. Muraco was not scheduled to compete in the match but replaced Billy Graham, who was originally scheduled to be Hogan's teammate but retired because of his hip injury suffered during a match against Reed. Hogan eliminated Reed after he hit a leg drop on Reed and pinned him to eliminate him first. Patera was eliminated after falling victim to One Man Gang's Flying Clothesline. Thereafter, Orndorff (who had recently turned face) and Rude began brawling to advance their feud over who had the better physique; Orndorff gotten the best of Rude until Bundy distracted him, allowing Rude to use a roll up to score the pin. Muraco (who had also recently turned face) joined the match and powerslammed Rude to eliminate him. One Man Gang entered and then hit Muraco with a 747 Splash to eliminate him, giving André's team a three–two advantage. One Mang Gang and Bundy began dominating Bigelow, when André was tagged in to go for the kill. However, Bigelow ducked an André punch and tagged in Hogan. Hogan immediately began getting the better of André and was setting up for a running elbow smash, when he was pulled out of the ring by Bundy; Hogan fought off both heels but was kept out of the ring long enough to be counted out. Hogan re-entered the ring to argue with the referees, but ring announcer Howard Finkel informed the crowd that if Hogan did not leave the ring immediately, Andre's team would win the match automatically. Bigelow—the lone remaining member of Hogan's team—fended for himself, using a Slingshot to eliminate Bundy, then pinning One Man Gang after he missed a 747 Splash. Bigelow eventually fell victim to André, who hit a butterfly suplex to win the match. After the match, Hogan returned to the ring and attacked André, hitting him with his title belt and knocking him from the ring.

== Aftermath ==
Hulk Hogan and André the Giant engaged in a war of words over the WWF World Heavyweight Championship during the following months, with the feud taking on a new level when Ted DiBiase – who was Hogan's primary challenger at the time – announced he planned to offer Hogan a cash buyout in exchange for the title, which Hogan emphatically refused. With fan anticipation of a Hogan-André rematch, André sneak attacked Hogan on Saturday Night's Main Event XIII, choking the champion until he was virtually unconscious, and shortly thereafter, DiBiase announced his alignment with André to help him win the championship. At the first Royal Rumble supercard on January 24, 1988, Hogan and André signed a contract for a WrestleMania III rematch. Their WWF title rematch took place on The Main Event I on February 5, 1988, where André controversially defeated Hogan for the WWF World Heavyweight Championship. However, his reign was short lived. In fact, he was the shortest reigning WWF World Heavyweight Champion in history as his reign lasted even less than a minute as he sold the title to DiBiase. WWF President Jack Tunney immediately vacated the title and it was decided in a 14-man tournament at WrestleMania IV, with the winner winning the vacant title. With help from former champion Hogan, Randy Savage defeated DiBiase in the finals of the tournament to win the vacant WWF World Heavyweight Championship.

Bigger things lay ahead for several other competitors, including Savage, the Honky Tonk Man and the tag team Demolition:

- Savage continued to battle the Honky Tonk Man for the Intercontinental Championship, but was unsuccessful. However, Savage would be entered in the championship tournament at WrestleMania IV, defeating DiBiase in the final match to win the title.
- Honky went on to a record-setting Intercontinental Championship reign, holding the title 454 consecutive days until the inaugural SummerSlam, when he was pinned by Ultimate Warrior.
- Demolition went on to replace the Hart Foundation as the top heel tag team in the WWF, becoming over with fans with their charisma and power brawling. As tag team champions Strike Force finished their feud with Hart and Neidhart—the feud was ultimately blown off in the winter of 1988 with a series of steel cage matches, most of them having Savage join Santana and Martel, and Honky join the Harts—Demolition continued to dominate the tag team ranks before challenging Strike Force for the tag team belts. At WrestleMania IV, Demolition defeated Strike Force to win the tag team belts, and went on to a then-record 478-day reign as champions.

A second Survivor Series occurred the following year, establishing the event as an annual November pay-per-view, becoming one of the WWF's original four annual pay-per-views, along with WrestleMania, Royal Rumble, and SummerSlam, which were eventually referred to as the "Big Four". From 1993 to 2002, these four were referred to as the "Big Five" along with King of the Ring, but that event was discontinued after its 2002 event. In August 2021, Money in the Bank became recognized as one of the "Big Five". Survivor Series has since become the second longest running pay-per-view event in history (behind WrestleMania). Since the inaugural event, Survivor Series has been characterized for featuring Survivor Series matches, typically pitting teams of four or five wrestlers against each other. Although there was a women's Survivor Series match in 1987, the second such contest did not occur until the 1995 event. Before 2022, there have been only two instances in which a Survivor Series match did not occur at the titular event—the 1998 event and 2002 event. Those events, however, instead had a different type of elimination match; 1998 had an entire 14-man single elimination tournament, while 2002 saw the first-ever Elimination Chamber match in addition to an elimination tables match and a triple threat elimination tag team match. From 2016 until 2021, Survivor Series was based on competition between WWE's brands, which is the term for WWE's roster division in which the promotion assigns wrestlers to exclusively perform for one of their brands. From 2022 onwards, Survivor Series carries the WarGames concept.

== Home Video and Streaming ==
The event was released on VHS by Coliseum Video in the United States. The event was edited down to two hours, but included exclusive footage that had been shot for the video. In 1991, Silver Vision released the event on VHS in the United Kingdom. Unlike subsequent Survivor Series VHS in the UK, the video could only be ordered via mail order and was not available in video stores.

It was re-released on DVD in the United Kingdom in November 2004 as part of Silver Vision's Tagged Classics range, and was paired with Survivor Series 1988. This DVD set was not released in the USA.

The event was uploaded to the WWE Network streaming service on the platform's launch in 2014. In November 2025, the WWE uploaded the full event to their WWE Vault YouTube channel, for free streaming.

== Results ==
No.	Results	Stipulations	Times
1	Brutus Beefcake, Jake Roberts, Jim Duggan, Randy Savage, and Ricky Steamboat (with Miss Elizabeth) defeated Dangerous Danny Davis, Harley Race, Hercules, The Honky Tonk Man, and Ron Bass (with Bobby Heenan and Jimmy Hart)	5-on-5 Survivor Series match^{Eliminations}	23:38
2	The Fabulous Moolah, The Jumping Bomb Angels (Itsuki Yamazaki and Noriyo Tateno), Rockin' Robin, and Velvet McIntyre defeated Dawn Marie, Donna Christanello, The Glamour Girls (Leilani Kai and Judy Martin), and Sensational Sherri (with Jimmy Hart)	5-on-5 Survivor Series match^{Eliminations}	20:17
3	The British Bulldogs (Davey Boy Smith and Dynamite Kid), The Killer Bees (B. Brian Blair and Jim Brunzell), The Rougeau Brothers (Jacques Rougeau and Raymond Rougeau), Strike Force (Rick Martel and Tito Santana), and The Young Stallions (Jim Powers and Paul Roma) defeated The Bolsheviks (Boris Zhukov and Nikolai Volkoff), Demolition (Ax and Smash), The Dream Team (Dino Bravo and Greg Valentine), The Hart Foundation (Bret Hart and Jim Neidhart), and The Islanders (Haku and Tama) (with Bobby Heenan, Mr. Fuji, Jimmy Hart, Johnny Valiant and Slick)	10-on-10 Survivor Series tag team match^{Eliminations}	37:14
4	André the Giant, Butch Reed, King Kong Bundy, One Man Gang, and Rick Rude (with Bobby Heenan and Slick) defeated Bam Bam Bigelow, Don Muraco, Hulk Hogan, Ken Patera, and Paul Orndorff (with Oliver Humperdink)	5-on-5 Survivor Series match^{Eliminations}	24:07

=== Survivor Series matches ===
^1

Eliminated	Wrestler	Eliminated by	Method	Time
1	Harley Race	N/A	Double countout	4:33
1	Jim Duggan	N/A	Double countout	4:33
3	Ron Bass	Brutus Beefcake	Pinfall	6:58
4	Brutus Beefcake	The Honky Tonk Man	Pinfall	10:47
5	Danny Davis	Jake Roberts	Pinfall	15:06
6	Hercules	Randy Savage	Pinfall	20:56
7	The Honky Tonk Man	N/A	Countout	23:38
Survivors:	Randy Savage, Jake Roberts, Ricky Steamboat			23:38

^2

Eliminated	Wrestler	Eliminated by	Method	Time
1	Donna Christanello	Velvet McIntyre	Pinfall	1:57
2	Dawn Marie	Rockin' Robin	Pinfall	4:12
3	Rockin' Robin	Sensational Sherri	Pinfall	6:55
4	The Fabulous Moolah	Judy Martin	Pinfall	10:55
5	Sensational Sherri	Velvet McIntyre	Pinfall	14:56
6	Velvet McIntyre	Leilani Kai	Pinfall	17:24
7	Leilani Kai	Itsuki Yamazaki	Pinfall	18:38
8	Judy Martin	Noriyo Tateno	Pinfall	20:17
Survivors:	The Jumping Bomb Angels			20:17

^3

Eliminated	Wrestler (Tag Team)	Eliminated by	Method	Time
1	Boris Zhukov (Bolsheviks)	Tito Santana (Strike Force)	Pinfall	1:45
2	Jacques Rougeau (Fabulous Rougeaus)	Ax (Demolition)	Pinfall	5:49
3	Smash (Demolition)	N/A	Disqualification	9:11
4	Tito Santana (Strike Force)	Jim Neidhart (Hart Foundation)	Pinfall	12:04
5	Dynamite Kid (British Bulldogs)	Haku (Islanders)	Pinfall	19:57
6	Greg Valentine (Dream Team)	Paul Roma (Young Stallions)	Pinfall	23:39
7	Bret Hart (Hart Foundation)	Jim Brunzell (Killer Bees)	Pinfall	30:27
8	Tama (Islanders)	B. Brian Blair (Killer Bees)	Pinfall	37:14
Survivors:	Killer Bees and Young Stallions			37:14

^4

Eliminated	Wrestler	Eliminated by	Method	Time
1	Butch Reed	Hulk Hogan	Pinfall	3:06
2	Ken Patera	One Man Gang	Pinfall	8:45
3	Paul Orndorff	Rick Rude	Pinfall	10:25
4	Rick Rude	Don Muraco	Pinfall	11:20
5	Don Muraco	One Man Gang	Pinfall	12:56
6	Hulk Hogan	N/A	Countout	18:05
7	King Kong Bundy	Bam Bam Bigelow	Pinfall	20:32
8	One Man Gang	Bam Bam Bigelow	Pinfall	22:52
9	Bam Bam Bigelow	André the Giant	Pinfall	24:07
Sole Survivor:	André the Giant			24:07
