= 5th Von Erich Memorial Parade of Champions =

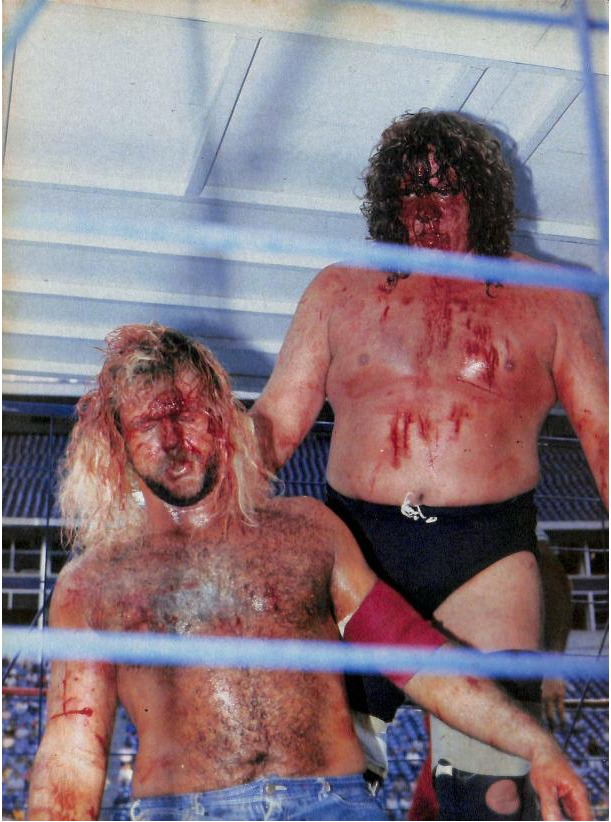
- Promotion: World Class Wrestling Association
- Date: May 8, 1988
- City: Irving, Texas
- Venue: Texas Stadium
- Attendance: 7,000

Event chronology
← Previous; Christmas Star Wars	Next → 5th Cotton Bowl Extravaganza

Parade of Champions chronology
← Previous; 1988	Next → Last

The 5th Von Erich Memorial Parade of Champions was the last Parade of Champions professional wrestling supercard event produced by World Championship Wrestling Association (WCWA) on May 7, 1988 at the Texas Stadium in Irving, Texas. Highlights of select matches aired on ESPN.

The event was headlined by a WCWA World Heavyweight Championship match, in which Kerry Von Erich defeated the defending champion Iceman King Parsons to win the title. In other prominent matches on the card, the WCWA Texas Tag Team Champions John Tatum and Jack Victory defeated the Wild West Tag Team Champions Terry Gordy and Steve Simpson via count-out to retain the Texas Tag Team Championship and win the Wild West Tag Team Championship, Terry Taylor defeated Chris Adams to win the WCWA Texas Heavyweight Championship, Jason Sterling, Steve Casey and John Tatum won the Triple Dome Texas Roundup match, and Terry Gordy defeated Michael Hayes in a Triple Dome of Terror match.

== Background ==
Parade of Champions was a major supercard produced by WCWA sporadically since 1961. It became an annual event in 1984 for the month of May, as a tribute to David Von Erich, who suddenly died in Japan, back in February. The 1984 event was held as a memorial for David and WCWA continued to produce Parade of Champions memorial events as tribute to David from 1984 to 1986 and a tribute to both David and Mike Von Erich in 1987 and 1988.

== Aftermath ==
Kerry Von Erich and Iceman Parsons continued their rivalry after Parade of Champions. Parsons defeated Von Erich in a non-title no disqualification last man standing match on May 13. However, Von Erich took another title from Parsons on July 1, when Cosmic Cowboys (Kevin and Kerry Von Erich) defeated Parsons and Terry Taylor to win the WCWA World Tag Team Championship. On July 8, Cosmic Cowboys and Michael Hayes defeated Parsons, Kamala, and Buddy Roberts to win the WCWA World Six-Man Tag Team Championship.

Steve Simpson continued his rivalry with Jack Victory and John Tatum after the event, as Simpson Brothers (Steve and Shaun Simpson) defeated Victory and Tatum in a non-title match on July 4, but Victory and Tatum won a non-title steel cage match on July 9. On July 25, Simpson Brothers defeated Victory and Tatum to win the Texas Tag Team Championship. On September 5, Tatum teamed with a new partner Jimmy Jack Funk to defeat Simpson Brothers for the titles.

== Results ==
No.	Results	Stipulations	Times
1	The Missing Link and Jason Sterling defeated Vince Apollo and The Angel of Death	Tag team match	—
2	Mike George (c) defeated Jeff Raitz	Singles match for the WWA World Heavyweight Championship	—
3	Steve Casey defeated Eric Embry	Singles match	00:19
4	Black Bart defeated Bill Irwin by disqualification.	Singles match	—
5	Terry Gordy defeated Michael Hayes	Triple Dome of Terror match	—
6	Terry Taylor (c) defeated Chris Adams	Singles match for the WCWA Texas Heavyweight Championship	—
7	Jason Sterling, Steve Casey and John Tatum won by defeating Angel of Death, Terry Gordy, Michael Hayes, King Parsons, Buddy Roberts, Jack Victory, Shaun Simpson and six others	"Triple Dome Texas Roundup" Match	—
8	Bruiser Brody and Kevin Von Erich defeated Buddy Roberts and a Masked Man	Tag team match	—
9	John Tatum and Jack Victory (WCWA-Texas) defeated Terry Gordy and Steve Simpson (Wild West) by count-out	Tag team match for the WCWA Texas Tag Team Championship and the Wild West Tag Team Championship	—
10	Kerry Von Erich defeated Iceman Parsons (c)	Singles match for the WCWA World Heavyweight Championship	—
(c) / – the champion(s) heading into the match

== See also ==
- 1988 in professional wrestling
