= Sherri Martel =

American professional wrestler and manager (1958–2007)

- A promotional photo of Martel

Personal information
- Born: Sherry Lynn Russell; February 8, 1958 Birmingham, Alabama, U.S.
- Died: June 15, 2007 (aged 49) McCalla, Alabama, U.S.
- Cause of death: Drug overdose
- Spouse: Robert Schrull
- Children: 1

Professional wrestling career
- Ring name(s): Peggy Sue; Queen Sherri; Scary Sherri; Sensational Sherri; Sensuous Sherri; Sherri Martel; Sherri Martine; Sister Sherri
- Billed height: 5 ft 7 in (170 cm)
- Billed weight: 132–138 lb (60–63 kg)
- Billed from: New Orleans, Louisiana
- Trained by: Donna Christanello; The Fabulous Moolah
- Debut: 1980
- Retired: 2006

Sherry Lynn Schrull (née Russell; February 8, 1958 – June 15, 2007) was an American professional wrestler and manager, better known by her ring names, Sherri Martel and Sensational Sherri.

Martel began her professional wrestling career in the Mid South after training in Columbia, South Carolina. She joined the American Wrestling Association (AWA) in the mid-1980s and held its AWA World Women's Championship three times. In the late 1980s, she joined the World Wrestling Federation (WWF), where she held the WWF Women's Championship. Also in the WWF, Martel continued to act as a manager to wrestlers such as Randy Savage, Ted DiBiase, and Shawn Michaels. She appeared in Extreme Championship Wrestling (ECW) and World Championship Wrestling (WCW) in the 1990s. In the latter, Martel acted as the manager for the tag team Harlem Heat. After leaving WCW, she made few wrestling related appearances until her death in 2007. She also appeared in Total Nonstop Action Wrestling in September 2006 as a manager for Bobby Roode which ended up being her last televised wrestling appearance. Her titular ring name, "Sensational Sherri", was used as the episode title in the fifth season of Viceland's docuseries, Dark Side of the Ring, aired on April 23, 2024.

== Early life ==
Sherry Lynn Russell was born on February 8, 1958, in Birmingham, Alabama, and grew up playing basketball and participating in track and field.

== Professional wrestling career ==
=== Early career (1980–1985) ===
Martel was first introduced to professional wrestling as a child, when her mother took her and her sister to shows in Mississippi. Their mother initially asked them whether they wanted to attend a wrestling show or go ice skating. In 1974, Martel approached Grizzly Smith for advice on becoming a wrestler; as she was 16, he questioned her conviction and then told her to come back to him when she was an adult. She met her first husband, Leroy Gonzalez, while working as an exotic dancer. They married in 1976. She gave birth to a son named Jared but soon divorced and left her family to continue her pursuit of a wrestling career. She enrolled in a wrestling school run by "Mr. Personality" Butch Moore in Memphis, Tennessee. She started wrestling as Sherri Martine, but Moore told her she needed more training and suggested she contact the Fabulous Moolah, the long-time women's wrestling champ, who booked most of the female wrestlers at the time. She began training at The Fabulous Moolah's school, where Moolah changed her name to Sherri Martel and sent her to wrestle in Japan in 1981. Moolah claims that Martel frequented night clubs and liked to party, which resulted in Moolah kicking her out of the school.

After leaving the school, she traveled back to Tennessee. In Memphis, she was managed by Jim Cornette. During a mixed battle royal, Martel suffered an injury that removed her from wrestling temporarily. She then worked as both a wrestler and manager for Pat Rose and Tom Prichard.

=== American Wrestling Association (1985–1987) ===
After Martel recovered, Larry Zbyszko helped her join the American Wrestling Association (AWA). She eventually debuted in the AWA and, on September 28, 1985, at SuperClash in Chicago, she defeated Candi Devine for the AWA World Women's Championship. She traded the belt with Devine, and on June 28, 1986, at "Battle by the Bay," Martel defeated Devine to win the AWA World Women's Championship for a third and final time. Martel, however, only held the title briefly before vacating it.

During this time, in addition to wrestling, Martel acted as the manager for the team of "Playboy" Buddy Rose and "Pretty Boy" Doug Somers, whom she managed to win the AWA World Tag Team Championship. Rose and Somers then engaged in a lengthy feud with The Midnight Rockers (Shawn Michaels and Marty Jannetty), who defeated Rose and Somers for the tag team title on January 27, 1987, in St. Paul, Minnesota.

=== World Wrestling Federation (1987–1993) ===
==== Debut & Women's Champion (1987–1988) ====
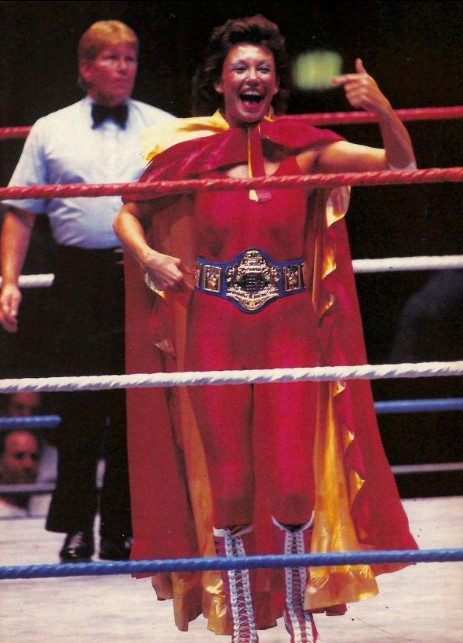
Sherri with the WWF Women's Championship, 1987

After former AWA wrestler Jesse Ventura referred her to the World Wrestling Federation (WWF), she debuted on July 24, 1987, defeating The Fabulous Moolah for the WWF Women's Championship. Renaming herself Sensational Sherri, she reigned as WWF Women's Champion for fifteen months before losing it to Rockin' Robin on October 8, 1988, in Paris. At the Survivor Series in 1987, Martel's team consisting of Martel, Women's World Tag Team Champions The Glamour Girls (Leilani Kai and Judy Martin), Dawn Marie, and Donna Christanello lost to The Fabulous Moolah's team consisting of Moolah, Velvet McIntyre, Rockin' Robin, and the Jumping Bomb Angels (Noriyo Tateno and Itsuki Yamazaki). When the WWF phased out its women's division in 1990, Martel remained with the company and turned her attention to managing male wrestlers.

Concurrent with her reign as WWF Women's Champion, Martel made several appearances in costume as "Peggy Sue," the girlfriend of The Honky Tonk Man, who was in the midst of a run as Intercontinental Champion. Her primary role was to irritate Honky's opponents—namely, Randy "Macho Man" Savage and Brutus Beefcake, and interfere in his matches.

==== Managing Randy Savage and Ted DiBiase (1989–1992) ====
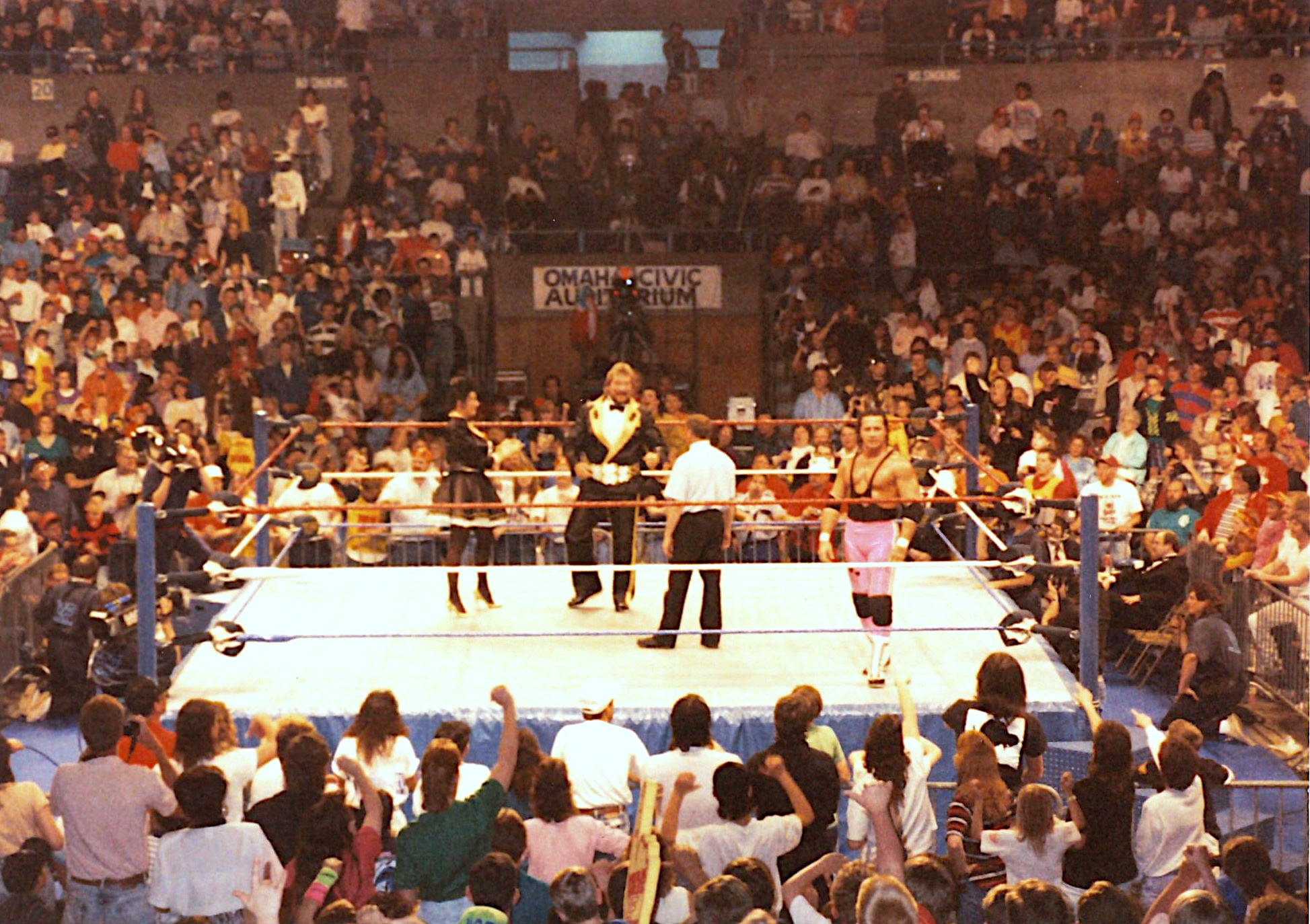
Sherri managed several wrestlers in WWF, including Ted DiBiase during his time as Million Dollar Champion

After WrestleMania V, Martel confronted Miss Elizabeth, manager of newly dethroned former WWF World champion Randy Savage, during an interview, leading to a confrontation between the two in which Savage fired Miss Elizabeth and repeatedly threatened to hit her. Martel then attacked Hulk Hogan from behind as he came to Miss Elizabeth's rescue, leaving him open to a chair attack from Savage, Throughout the remainder of 1989, Martel and Savage feuded with Hogan and Miss Elizabeth. At SummerSlam, Hogan and Brutus "The Barber" Beefcake defeated the team of Savage and Zeus. After the match, Miss Elizabeth knocked out Martel with Martel's purse, and she, Hogan, and Beefcake cut Martel's hair.

Shortly afterwards, Savage defeated Jim Duggan for the King of the Ring title in September 1989. While Savage began referring to himself as "The Macho King" going forward, Sherri likewise became known as "Sensational Queen Sherri".

At WrestleMania VI in 1990, Martel and Savage lost a mixed tag-team match against Sapphire and Dusty Rhodes after Miss Elizabeth, who was in the corner of Sapphire and Rhodes, interfered and shoved Martel. During that same year, Martel and Savage appeared on Lifestyles of the Rich and Famous with Robin Leach. During a steel cage match at Madison Square Garden, Ultimate Warrior pulled off an escaping Martel's miniskirt to reveal matching black garter belts and lace underpants. Practically in tears, Martel raced back to the locker room. At WrestleMania VII, Savage lost a "retirement match" against Ultimate Warrior, in which the loser would be forced (Kayfabe) to retire. After Savage lost the match, an irate Martel attacked Savage but was thrown from the ring by Miss Elizabeth, who had been watching from the audience.

Later on the WrestleMania VII card after she and Savage parted ways following the career match, Martel came to the ring to help "The Million Dollar Man" Ted DiBiase in his assault on an injured Rowdy Roddy Piper, following which she managed DiBiase until 1992.

==== Pairing and feuding with Shawn Michaels (1992–1993) ====
Subsequently, Martel began managing Shawn Michaels after Pat Patterson convinced Michaels to participate in the storyline. In February 1992, during Paul Bearer's interview segment The Funeral Parlor, Sherri declared she was now "in love" with Shawn Michaels, who had just turned on his longtime tag team partner Marty Jannetty. She also sang Michaels' theme song called "Sexy Boy". As part of his gimmick, Michaels would admire himself in a full-length mirror before his matches. At Summerslam in 1992 Sherri was ringside for a rare heel vs heel match involving Michaels and Rick Martel. The stipulation of the match was that neither man could hit the other in the face which was attributed to the arrogant yet handsome characters of both men. Both Michaels and Martel fought for the affections of Sherri after the double count out result of the match when Sherri feigned fainting requiring both men to come to blows and attempt to carry Sherri backstage. In 1992, before a match, Jannetty grabbed the mirror and attempted to hit Michaels with it, but Michaels pulled Martel in front of him. After being hit with the mirror, she was absent from television until the Royal Rumble in January 1993. At the Rumble, she was in a neutral corner for the match between Michaels and Jannetty but eventually turned on Michaels during the match, cementing a face turn. Backstage, Michaels confronted her and Jannetty came to her rescue. The storyline, however, was cut short as Jannetty was released from the company in the midst of the feud. Martel spent the remainder of the year aligned with Tatanka, who aided her in her feud with Luna Vachon and Bam Bam Bigelow. She was released from the World Wrestling Federation during the summer. Two reasons have been given for Sherri's departure: her decision to enroll in cosmetology school and failed drug tests.

=== United States Wrestling Association (1993) ===
Towards the end of her time in the WWF, Martel participated in a WWF invasion angle in the United States Wrestling Association, reuniting with Savage. Martel would suffer a similar embarrassment to that which she had suffered at the hands of Ultimate Warrior when she ran in the ring to aid Savage in a steel cage match in Memphis against his old enemy in the area, Jerry "The King" Lawler, but after accidentally knocking Savage from the ring, she had her dress yanked off by Lawler as she climbed the cage to escape.

=== Smoky Mountain Wrestling (1993) ===
After her WWF release, Martel had a brief spell in Smoky Mountain Wrestling, siding with Tracy Smothers in a feud with Tammy Sytch, Brian Lee, as well as several intergender matches with Jim Cornette.

=== Eastern Championship Wrestling (1993–1994) ===
She began working in Eastern Championship Wrestling (ECW) in 1993, managing Shane Douglas. At November to Remember on November 13, Martel faced Malia Hosaka in a match. Sherri continued to manage Douglas until the spring of 1994.

=== World Championship Wrestling (1994–1997, 2000) ===
==== Managing Ric Flair (1994) ====
Martel signed with World Championship Wrestling (WCW) in 1994. The original plan for her was to manage Kevin and Dave Sullivan against Missy Hyatt and The Nasty Boys, but after Hyatt was fired in February 1994, the proposed rivalry went on with no managers for either team.

Martel made her debut on the April 23 edition of WCW Saturday Night, under the name Sensuous Sherri (this was because the name Sensational Sherri was trademarked by the WWF). In an interview with Gene Okerlund, she said her goal was to find a man who can bring her the WCW World Heavyweight Championship. She was ringside at Slamboree on May 22, during the WCW World Heavyweight Championship match between Ric Flair and Barry Windham. On June 24, a title unification match took place at the Clash of the Champions XXVII between WCW World Heavyweight Champion Ric Flair and the WCW International World Heavyweight Champion Sting. Although she revealed in the beginning of the match she sided with Sting (including wearing his signature face paint), it turned out to be a double cross, as she sided with Flair, who won the match and unified the titles, double-teaming Sting, until the newly signed Hulk Hogan made the save.

At Bash at the Beach, Martel tried to help Flair to defeat Hogan in a match by giving him brass knuckles, but failed. At the feud's climactic battle, a steel cage match at Halloween Havoc, Martel climbed the cage to aid Flair and in the process had her dress pulled off by Jimmy Hart, Hogan's manager, leaving her dangling from the cage in black lingerie.

==== Managing Harlem Heat (1994–1997) ====
Next, Martel began managing Harlem Heat (Booker T and Stevie Ray) using the name Sister Sherri. She managed the team to seven WCW World Tag Team Championship reigns. In late 1994 (while still managing Harlem Heat in WCW), Martel made a return appearance in ECW managing Shane Douglas and Brian Pillman against Ron Simmons and 2 Cold Scorpio.

==== Return and final appearances (2000) ====
In 2000, she made three wrestling television appearances with WCW. The first was at the Souled Out 2000 pay-per-view event, watching at ringside during the Chris Benoit vs. Sid Vicious matchup for the WCW World Heavyweight Championship. The second was on the January 19, 2000, edition of WCW Thunder where she had a match with Madusa, which she lost. In her third and final appearance in WCW, she had a match with Mona, which she also lost.

=== Later career and WWE Hall of Fame (1997–2006) ===
After leaving WCW, Martel won the IWA Mid-South Women's Title defeating Debbie Combs on August 28, 1997. A few weeks later she dropped the title back to Combs.

Early in 1999, Martel competed in a mixed-tag team match for the Apocalypse Wrestling Federation's Heavyweight Championship, a title held predominately by men. Missy Hyatt pinned Martel to win the title. In October 1999, she appeared on the Heroes of Wrestling pay-per-view managing Greg Valentine in a match against George Steele. Also in 1999, she was awarded the AWA Superstars Women's Championship.

She wrestled her very last match at WrestleReunion on January 29, 2005, teaming with Peggy Lee Leather, Amber O'Neal and Krissy Vaine losing to Wendi Richter, Malia Hosaka, Bambi and Jenny Taylor.

In 2005, she returned to WWE to take part in a storyline with her former client, Shawn Michaels, and Kurt Angle shortly before their match at WrestleMania 21. She made a return to SmackDown!, singing Michaels' theme song (the original recording of Michaels' theme song featured Martel on vocals) with Angle.

She was inducted into the WWE Hall of Fame by Ted DiBiase in April 2006. Later that year, she worked for TNA Wrestling, taping a backstage vignette trying to offer her managerial services to "free agent" Bobby Roode that aired on the September 21, 2006 TNA Impact!; it was her last wrestling television appearance.

== Personal life ==
By 2003, she was living in Tennessee with her husband, Robert Schrull, where she helped him renovate houses. She was married and divorced at least twice during her life. She had one son.

== Death ==
On June 15, 2007, Martel died at her mother's residence in McCalla, Alabama, near Birmingham. She was 49 years old. On September 11, 2007, homicide investigators in Tuscaloosa, Alabama, released the toxicology report stating that she died of an accidental overdose with multiple drugs in her system, including high amounts of oxycodone. She was cremated after her death.

== Championships and accomplishments ==
- American Wrestling Association
  - AWA World Women's Championship (3 times)
- AWA Superstars of Wrestling
  - AWA World Women's Championship (1 time)
- Cauliflower Alley Club
  - Other honoree (1994)
- International Wrestling Association
  - IWA Women's Championship (1 time)
- Memphis Wrestling Hall of Fame
  - Class of 2022
- Professional Wrestling Hall of Fame
  - Class of 2014
- Southern States Wrestling
  - Kingsport Wrestling Hall of Fame (Class of 2003)
- Women Superstars Uncensored
  - WSU Hall of Fame (Class of 2009)
- Women's Wrestling Hall of Fame
  - Class of 2024
- World Wrestling Federation / World Wrestling Entertainment
  - WWF Women's Championship (1 time)
  - WWE Hall of Fame (Class of 2006)
- Wrestling Observer Newsletter
  - Manager of the Year (1991)
- Video Games
- Manager in MicroLeague Wrestling
- DLC Manager in WWE 2k15
- Manager in WWE 2k16
- DLC playable character in WWE 2k24
- playable character in WWE 2k25
- playable character in WWE 2k26

== See also ==
- List of premature professional wrestling deaths
