= One Man Gang =

American professional wrestler (born 1960)

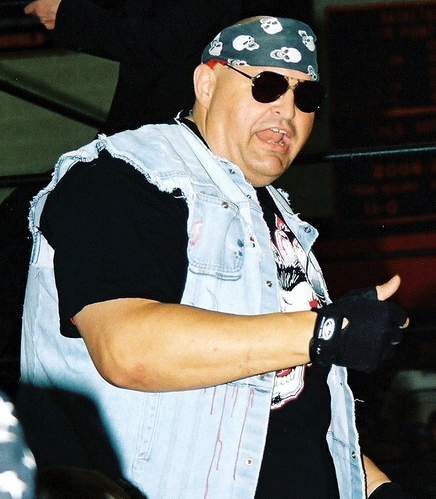
- One Man Gang in 2009

Personal information
- Born: George Gray; February 12, 1960 (age 66) Chicago, Illinois, U.S.

Professional wrestling career
- Ring name(s): Akeem; Crusher Broomfield; Crusher Gray; George Gray; One Man Gang; Panama Gang; U.E.I. Gang
- Billed height: 6 ft 9 in (206 cm)
- Billed weight: 450 lb (204 kg)
- Billed from: Halsted Street, Chicago (as One Man Gang) "Deepest, Darkest Africa" (as Akeem)
- Debut: 1977
- Retired: 2009

George Gray (born February 12, 1960) is an American retired professional wrestler, better known by his ring name (The) One Man Gang. For three years in the World Wrestling Federation (WWF), he was Akeem "The African Dream". Prior to this, he was the top heel for Universal Wrestling Federation (UWF), and UWF Heavyweight Champion for six months in 1986 and 1987.

== Early life ==
Gray was born in Chicago, but moved to Spartanburg, South Carolina, when he was 5.

== Professional wrestling career ==
=== Early career (1977–1982) ===
Gray trained with longtime local independent wrestler and promoter Chief Jay Eagle (Jerry Bragg) and Darren "Rattlesnake" Westbrooks. He started his career at the age of 17 on the Carolina independent circuit wrestling both under his real name and as "Crusher Gray." He then moved on to wrestle in the Kentucky/Tennessee area, including for International Championship Wrestling (ICW), under the ring name Crusher Broomfield. Gray went in as part of a package along with Bragg, Westbrooks, and Ric Starr. One of Broomfield's major angles was that his contract was owned by ICW Champion Randy Savage and Savage's nemesis Ron Garvin defeated Savage in a match to set Broomfield free. He later worked for several National Wrestling Alliance-affiliated promotions, Mid-South Wrestling, and World Class Championship Wrestling (WCCW) as One Man Gang, billed as being from Chicago's Halsted Street on the South Side. He was managed by Kevin Sullivan, Skandor Akbar, Theodore Long, Gentleman Jim Holiday, and Sir Oliver Humperdink in various territories.

=== Various territories (1983–1986) ===
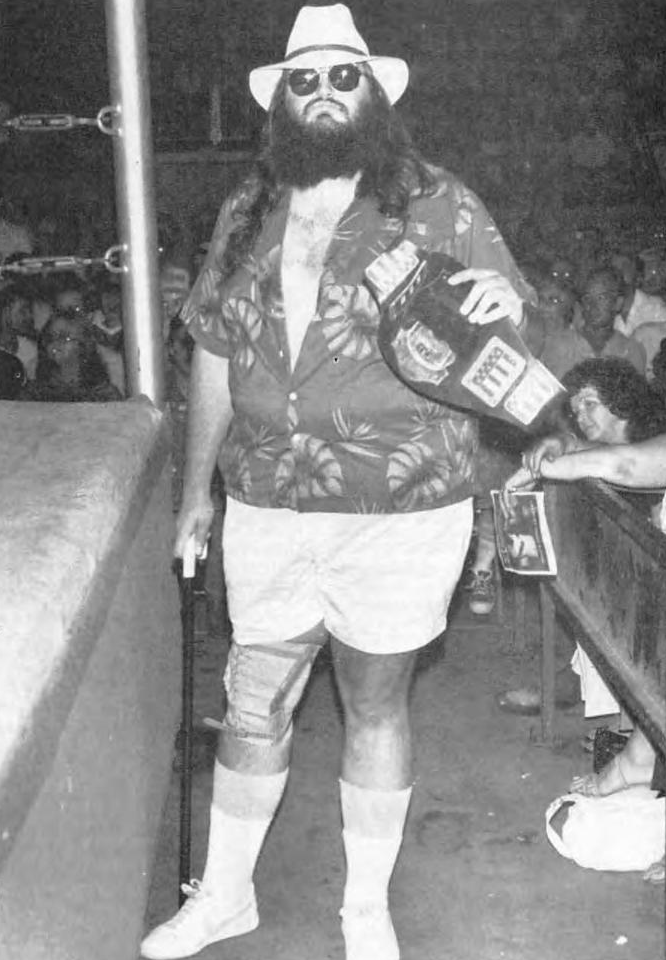
Gang with the NWA Brass Knuckles Championship (Florida version), circa 1984

Gang worked for many territories during this time for three years. His biggest success was in Florida where he had a feud with Dusty Rhodes from 1983 to 1984. Also, he feuded with Blackjack Mulligan and Mike Rotunda. He teamed up with Ron Bass and won the tag team titles defeating Rhodes and Mike Davis. Two months after they dropped the titles to Rotunda and Davis. In November 1984 as Panama Gang, he became the last NWA Brass Knuckles Championship (Florida version) defeating Mulligan. Later the title was abandoned when Gang left the territory in 1985.

Then Gang worked for All Japan Pro Wrestling from 1983 to 1984 and 1986 feuding with Giant Baba, Genichiro Tenryu and Jumbo Tsuruta. He teamed with Bruiser Brody, Killer Tim Brooks and Stan Hansen. In 1984 he teamed with Goro Tsurumi. Then in 1986 he teamed with Jerry Blackwell, Harley Race and Tiger Jeet Singh.

During these years he also worked in Canada, Central States and Texas.

=== World Class Championship Wrestling (1985–1986) ===
In the regional territories, he was a member of Skandor Akbar's "Devastation Inc." as well as working with Gary Hart in World Class Championship Wrestling (WCCW). He would feud with The Von Erichs teaming with Rick Rude. Also, he feuded in singles competition against Kerry Von Erich, King Parsons, Chris Adams, and Bruiser Brody.

On May 5, 1985, he lost to Kerry Von Erich in a hair vs hair match at the 2nd Von Erich Memorial Parade of Champions where he started sporting a mohawk. He lost to Bruiser Brody in a chain match at Christmas Star Wars 1985. Also lost to Brody again on two occasions a in a steel cage match on January 26 and 27, 1986.

=== Mid-South (1982–1983, 1985–1987) ===
It was as a protégé of Akbar's in the Mid-South territory where Gray would get the name that would stick with him the rest of his career. Making his debut in the territory by interfering in matches and assaulting the fan favorite, Mid-South announcer Bill Watts would say about the then-unnamed assailant "He's a one-man gang!" The Gang worked on-and-off in Mid-South in between tours of Florida, Toronto, Japan, and Texas. He would also return to his hometown territory, the Carolinas, to work for Jim Crockett Promotions, where he was initially billed as "The One Man Gang, George Gray." He worked in Texas All Star wrestling where he feuded with Big Bubba. It was on his last tour for Mid-South when the promotion renamed itself the Universal Wrestling Federation, with Gang as one of its top villains, feuding at the main-event level with UWF top fan favorite Jim Duggan. In late 1986, Gang won the UWF Heavyweight Championship in an angle where the champion Terry Gordy was injured earlier in the evening by a revenge-minded "Dr. Death" Steve Williams. Gang, scheduled to face Gordy later on the card, was awarded the belt via forfeit. He held that title for six months, mostly facing Duggan, Williams, and Ted DiBiase.

In May 1987, Gray began receiving inquiries from the World Wrestling Federation about coming up to wrestle for them. He promptly agreed to terms, but returned to the UWF in order to drop the title to Big Bubba Rogers, who was there from his normal place in the NWA due to the recent sale of the UWF to Jim Crockett.

=== World Wrestling Federation (1987–1990) ===
==== One Man Gang (1987–1988) ====
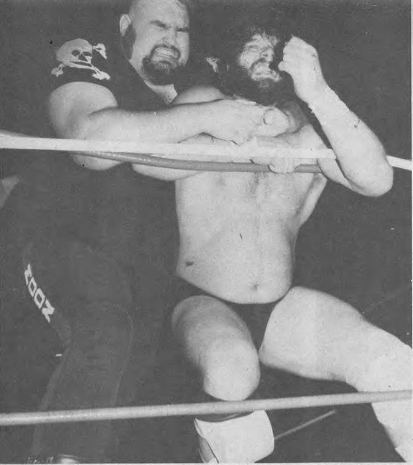
One Man Gang (left) in a match against Jim Duggan, c. 1986 or 1987

Gray made his debut in the WWF on May 12, 1987, being managed by Slick, in a match against Jesse Cortez. He spent much of his early WWF run defeating enhancement talent in extremely short matches in order to build him up, most notably in a match where he Gourdbustered his opponent after the bell and then did the same to the referee, thus being (kayfabe) fined $10,000 for his actions. While the Gang often defeated enhancement talent and other lower card wrestlers with ease, he was often on the end of defeat when main eventing against bigger stars such as Hulk Hogan and Randy Savage, although Gang was a major part of the angle regarding "Superstar" Billy Graham being forced into retirement. On October 4, One Man Gang won what was technically the first ever Royal Rumble at a house show. This was a 12 man test run of the match, held at Kiel Auditorium. One Man Gang participated in the inaugural Survivor Series pay-per-view as a member of André the Giant's team, fighting a team led by Hulk Hogan. In 1988, Gang entered the inaugural Royal Rumble at number 19 out of 20 participants and was one of the last two men left in the ring, before being eliminated by Jim Duggan. One Man Gang participated in the World Title Tournament at WrestleMania IV, defeating Bam Bam Bigelow by count-out in the opening round. He drew a bye in the quarterfinals before being disqualified in the semi-finals against eventual-tournament-winner Randy Savage after Gang attempted to hit Savage with his manager's cane. Following his loss at WrestleMania, Gang was Savage's first title defense as world champion, but lost by pinfall to the new champion. After that, Gang was placed lower "on the card", feuding with Bam Bam Bigelow, Koko B. Ware, and Don Muraco.

==== Akeem; Twin Towers (1988–1990) ====
In September 1988, One Man Gang's manager, Slick, announced that Gang was reborn as African and planned to embrace his roots. An episode of WWF Superstars, which aired on September 24, 1988, featured a vignette with Gene Okerlund on-location in an American ghetto that was dubbed "The Deepest Darkest Parts Of Africa," where dancers dressed as tribal Africans danced and chanted around a fire; Slick then announced that Gang would be known by his new name, "Akeem, the African Dream", though Okerlund immediately called him out as the One Man Gang. This vignette received criticism, as the White "Akeem" delivered a promo in which he spoke with a stereotypical "jive talk" black accent and danced in the style of Dusty Rhodes, while an "African ritual" took place in the background.

Akeem and Big Boss Man captained a team who featured "The Million Dollar Man" Ted DiBiase, Red Rooster, and Haku to battle the Mega Powers' team at Survivor Series in 1988. During the match, Akeem along with teammate Big Boss Man handcuffed Hulk Hogan to the ring post and were later disqualified. The two formed a team called the Twin Towers. They feuded with the Mega Powers (Hulk Hogan and WWF Champion "Macho Man" Randy Savage) and throughout the summer and fall of 1988, with the Twin Towers and Slick advertising title match that night against Demolition while on Arsenio Hall's talk show. They were also strongly involved in the storyline which would eventually cause Randy Savage to become a villain and defend his title against Hulk Hogan at WrestleMania V. In the Royal Rumble, Randy Savage was accidentally eliminated by teammate Hogan, allowing Akeem and Bossman to double team Hogan and eliminate him. The Main Event show broadcast live on NBC on February 3, 1989, featured The Mega Powers vs. The Twin Towers. During the match, Savage's manager (and real-life wife) Miss Elizabeth was injured after Savage was thrown through the ropes and knocked her to the ground, which led Hogan to abandon his partner and carry Elizabeth back to the locker room for medical help. Although Hogan later returned to the match to help Savage defeat Akeem and Boss Man, Hogan's actions with Elizabeth caused Savage to attack him backstage, setting up the headline match for WrestleMania.

The Twin Towers went on to face The Rockers at WrestleMania V and defeated them when Akeem pinned Shawn Michaels with a diving Air Africa after a powerbomb from the Big Boss Man. Though the Twin Towers never held the WWF Tag Team Championship, they did feud heavily with WWF World Tag Team champions Demolition at house shows after WrestleMania V, initially gaining wins by countout, later losing by pinfall after Boss Man would accidentally strike Akeem with his nightstick. The feud would continue even after Demolition lost the title to the Brain Busters with the Towers and André the Giant facing Demolition and Duggan (now "King Duggan") at SummerSlam 1989 with Smash pinning Akeem after Duggan struck him with his 2x4.

In early 1990, Big Boss Man refused to be part of a payoff from Ted DiBiase to get DiBiase's "Million Dollar Championship" belt back from Jake "The Snake" Roberts and turned on both his manager Slick and his partner Akeem. He then defeated Akeem at WrestleMania VI. Following the Ultimate Warrior's vacating of the WWF Intercontinental Heavyweight Championship after winning the world title at WrestleMania, a tournament was held to crown a new champion. Akeem was among the eight men entered, and he was defeated by Tito Santana by countout on the April 28 episode of WWF Superstars. That night on Saturday Night's Main Event he faced Big Boss Man in a rematch of the WrestleMania encounter; this time Boss Man won via disqualification after Ted Dibiase and Virgil interfered.

As the spring progressed Akeem saw his newly returned singles career ascendent, defeating Hillbilly Jim, Jimmy Snuka, Paul Roma, Hercules, and Jim Powers on the house show circuit. On the June 25 episode of Prime Time Wrestling he lost Jake Roberts via disqualification after Slick interfered; a week later on Prime Time he faced Tito Santana in a rematch, with the bout ending in a double count-out as both men battled onto the floor. Akeem followed that with a victory over Brady Boone on the July 9 episode of Prime Time. His momentum then came to a halt, as he lost to Hercules in numerous house show encounters that summer. Akeem slid down the card and was relegated to a house show series against Pez Whatley as the summer closed, of which he won all of their encounters. Akeem then wrestled as the replacement Bad News Brown in Harlem Street fights with Jake Roberts on the house show circuit.

On the September 22, 1990 episode of WWF Superstars, Akeem began to lay the groundwork for a feud with Saba Simba. Although he was beginning to be featured on television in a feud with Saba Simba, Gray left the WWF in October 1990 due to his fading role in the company at the time. He had been advertised to be a part of Sgt. Slaughter's team at the 1990 Survivor Series alongside the Orient Express. Due to his departure, he was replaced by Boris Zhukov, (Slaughter's old AWA enemy and former Cobra Corps tag partner in JCP as Private Jim Nelson). His final match came on October 22, 1990, when he defeated George Anderson on WWF Prime Time Wrestling.

=== United States Wrestling Association (1990) ===
On December 28, 1990, Gang would make his only appearance in United States Wrestling Association in Memphis where he won a battle royal.

=== Global Wrestling Federation (1991) ===
In 1991, Gang worked in Texas for Global Wrestling Federation.

=== World Championship Wrestling (1991, 1995–1996) ===
==== 1991 ====
On the March 5, 1991, taping of WCW Pro in Marietta, Georgia, Gray resumed his One Man Gang persona when he assisted Kevin Sullivan in attacking Ron Simmons after the latter's win over Joe Cruz. Gang went through a massive change in his gimmick, in which he was now schizophrenic and constantly lost his mind before, during and after matches. He was undefeated in the early going, beating Ranger Ross, Brad Armstrong, and Junkyard Dog. He made his first WCW PPV appearance on May 19 at SuperBrawl I when he attacked El Gigante following his match with Sid Vicious. He and Sullivan shaved Gigante's head in a post-match sneak attack on the June 22 edition of World Championship Wrestling. He lost a Hair vs. Career match on the final Great American Bash event in Atlanta's Omni on August 25. Other notable matches from Gang's 1991 WCW run include being involved in a handful of War Games matches at the Great American Bash house shows and advancing to the semi-finals of the WCW World Tag Team Championship tournament with partner Black Blood over Big Josh and El Gigante. He was promoted to be part of the "Chamber of Horrors" match at Halloween Havoc '91 in October, but was fired by Jim Herd in September for refusing to lose to P. N. News. He took a hiatus from wrestling for the next few years.

==== 1995–1996 ====
Gang returned to WCW in the fall of 1995, reverting his gimmick back to his normal biker's gimmick. He made his first appearance back on the November 16 taping of WCW Saturday Night when he defeated Scott Turner (the match aired December 2). His televised return came at WCW World War 3 on November 19, where he was the last person to be eliminated in the three ring, sixty man battle royal. Following this, he appeared in a post-show dark match for Starrcade '95: World Cup of Wrestling. He upset United States Champion Kensuke Sasaki to win the championship. Although the match was subsequently restarted with Sasaki winning, WCW never acknowledged the restart and Gang remained the titleholder when Sasaki returned to Japan.

His first US title defense came on the January 20, 1996, edition of WCW Saturday Night when he defeated Super Giant Ninja. Gang became a member of Sullivan's burgeoning Dungeon of Doom. On the January 22 edition of WCW Monday Nitro, Gang lost to Hulk Hogan in a non-title match. Following the match, he joined members of the Dungeon of Doom and The Four Horsemen in attacking Hogan and Randy Savage. The next night, at Clash of the Champions XXXII, Gang successfully defended the belt against Disco Inferno. His title run ended at the next television taping, when he was defeated by Konnan in a match that aired February 4 on WCW Main Event. He lost a rematch at SuperBrawl VI the next month and left WCW shortly thereafter.

=== Independent circuit (1996–2000) ===
After leaving WCW, Gang returned to Texas and wrestled in the Sportatorium, where he wrestled during his tenure in WCCW 10 years earlier. Gang defeated his former rival Terry Gordy on July 19, 1996. He feuded with Charlie Norris and Black Bart. On January 25, 1997, he lost to King Kong Bundy at NWA New Jersey.

On November 29, 1998, he returned to Japan and made an appearance for Frontier Martial-Arts Wrestling in a three-way against Sabu and Yukihiro Kanemura. Sabu won the match.

Gang wrestled at Heroes of Wrestling event on October 10, 1999, against Abdullah The Butcher in a double count out.

On June 30, 2000, Gang made an appearance for i-Generation Superstars of Wrestling in Sydney, Australia defeating Tatanka for the i-Generation Australasian Championship.

=== Extreme Championship Wrestling (1998–1999) ===
Also in 1998, Gang briefly joined Extreme Championship Wrestling, including appearing at their flagship event, November to Remember. He feuded with Rob Van Dam, Sabu and Shane Douglas. He also lost a series of matches to "giant killer" Spike Dudley. He left ECW in October 1999.

=== Return to WWF (1998, 2001) ===
One Man Gang wrestled in a dark match defeating Flash Flanagan prior to the February 3, 1998 Raw is War taping in Evansville, Indiana, but was not hired.

Gray made another appearance in the WWF in 2001 for the gimmick battle royal at WrestleMania X-Seven as One Man Gang, eliminating Michael Hayes and then getting eliminated by Kamala. The Iron Sheik won the battle royal.

=== Puerto Rico (2000–2001) ===
In 2000, he also worked for the World Wrestling Council in Puerto Rico where he won the World Wrestling Council (WWC) Hardcore Title and feuded with Abdullah The Butcher, El Nene, and Carlos Colón. He left Puerto Rico in June 2001. He would retire from wrestling.

=== Return to wrestling (2007–2009) ===
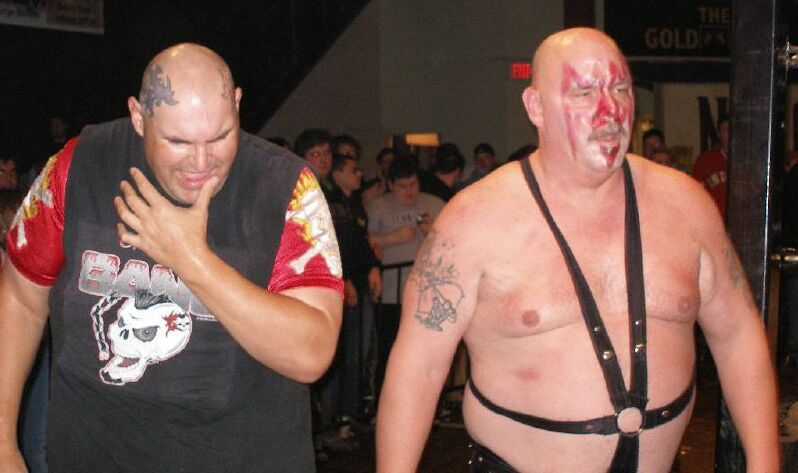
One Man Gang (left) and Smash in 2008

Gray came out of retirement in 2007 after a six-year hiatus. He made appearances on the independent circuit. He teamed with Kamala as they lost to The Powers of Pain on October 19, 2007, at Wrestlefanfest Malice in the Palace in San Francisco. He also made an appearance for Chikara's King Of Trios 2008, teaming with Demolition, where they lost to the Fabulous Three of Larry Sweeney, Mitch Ryder, and Shayne Hawke. On March 28, 2009, Gang wrestled at an International Wrestling Cartel event. He was defeated by Jim Duggan in the main event.

On March 26, 2026 at TNA Sacrifice, Gray was seated in the front row and featured on the broadcast as being in attendance.

== Other media ==
In 1992, Gray appeared in the movie Stay Tuned.

== Personal life ==
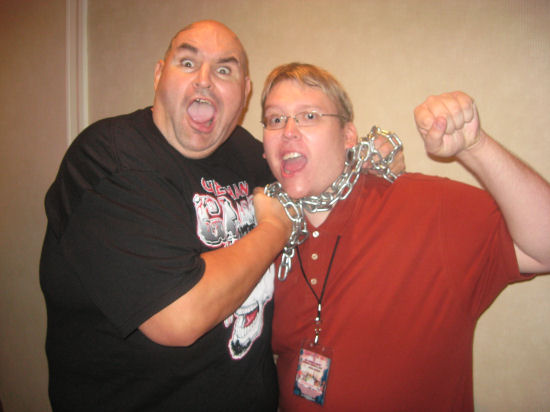
One Man Gang posing with a fan in October 2008 while holding his signature chain.

After his wrestling career, Gray worked as a prison guard at the Louisiana State Penitentiary, until a recurring back problem forced him to quit his job.

In later years, Gray lost a lot of weight following a heart attack in 2000.

In July 2016, Gray was named part of a class action lawsuit filed against WWE which alleged that wrestlers incurred traumatic brain injuries during their tenure and that the company concealed the risks of injury. The lawsuit was dismissed by US District Judge Vanessa Lynne Bryant in September 2018. In September 2020, an appeal for the lawsuit dismissed by a federal appeals court.

In August 2016, Gray's home in Baton Rouge was partially submerged by the 2016 Louisiana floods, destroying most of its contents. He was among the estimated 125,000 people who had not purchased flood insurance to cover the damage, as that part of the capital was not designated a flood zone, so he appealed for help through GoFundMe.

== Championships and accomplishments ==
- Bad Boys of Wrestling
  - BBOW Heavyweight Championship (1 time)
- Championship Wrestling from Florida
  - NWA Brass Knuckles Championship (Florida version) (1 time)
  - NWA United States Tag Team Championship (Florida version) (1 time) - with Ron Bass
- Deep South Wrestling
  - DSW Hardcore Championship (1 time)
- i-Generation Superstars of Wrestling

- i-Generation Wrestling Australasian Championship (2 times)

- Mid-Atlantic Championship Wrestling/World Championship Wrestling
  - WCW United States Heavyweight Championship (1 time)
  - NWA Mid-Atlantic Tag Team Championship (1 time) - with Kelly Kiniski
- Pro Wrestling Illustrated
  - Ranked No. 312 of the 500 best singles wrestlers of the "PWI Years" in 2003.
- Universal Wrestling Federation
  - UWF World Heavyweight Championship (1 time)
- World Class Championship Wrestling
  - NWA World Six-Man Tag Team Championship (Texas version) (1 time) - with Killer Tim Brooks and Mark Lewin
- World Wrestling Council
  - WWC Hardcore Championship (2 times)
- World Wrestling Federation
  - 12 Man Royal Rumble (1987)
  - Slammy Award (1 time)
    - Best Group (1987)

=== Luchas de Apuestas record ===
Winner (wager)	Loser (wager)	Location	Event	Date	Notes
El Gigante (hair)	One Man Gang (career)	Atlanta, Georgia	WCW Great American Bash Tour house show	August 25, 1991	
