= Dave Hebner =

Professional wrestling authority figure, promoter, road agent and referee (1949–2022)

Personal information
- Born: May 17, 1949 Richmond, Virginia, U.S.
- Died: June 17, 2022 (aged 73) Mechanicsville, Virginia, U.S.
- Spouse: Rebecca Hebner (m. 1979)
- Children: 2
- Relatives: Earl Hebner (twin brother); Brian Hebner (nephew)

Professional wrestling career
- Debut: 1963

David Hebner (May 17, 1949 – June 17, 2022) was an American professional wrestling authority figure, promoter, road agent, and referee. He was the identical twin brother of Earl Hebner.

== Career ==
Hebner debuted as a professional wrestling referee in the late 1970s in the Richmond, Virginia area. In 1985, he began working for the World Wrestling Federation, where he refereed many historic matches such as Randy Savage versus Ricky Steamboat at WrestleMania III and Randy Savage versus Hulk Hogan at WrestleMania V. Perhaps his most memorable appearance came on the February 5, 1988 episode of WWF The Main Event, when he was assigned to referee a match for the WWF World Heavyweight Championship between Hulk Hogan and André the Giant. André defeated Hogan after Hebner's twin brother, Earl, had switched places as Ted DiBiase had locked Dave in a closet. Earl Hebner quickly counted to three as André pinned Hogan, despite Hogan clearly having his shoulder up. The match and the WWF Championship were awarded to André as a result. Both Hebners received a $2,500 bonus for the match.

Prior to WrestleMania IV, the WWF attempted to extend the "evil twin" referee storyline through a kayfabe "investigative report" published in the promotions' flagship publication, WWF Magazine. The article used a fictional backstory to build sympathy for Dave by claiming he was continually victimized by Earl's misdeeds committed in Dave's name since their childhoods. In a 2001 interview with WWF Raw Magazine, Dave Hebner said the angle was soon dropped after he had suffered broken ribs when Earl kicked him (as part of the aftermath of the Hogan-Andre match during The Main Event). As a result, the storyline was shifted to have Earl come clean, and he was the referee when Randy Savage won the Tournament final at WrestleMania IV against Ted DiBiase for the WWF Championship.

After retiring as a referee following knee replacement surgery, Hebner became a road agent. He worked as a road agent until July 19, 2005, when he and his brother Earl were released from their contracts, allegedly due to the sale of WWE merchandise without authorization; in a March 2025 interview Earl stated that both Hebners were actually fired because WWE's then-head of talent relations John Laurinaitis wanted to terminate Dave, who was McMahon's right-hand man, from his employment, and the merchandise story was used as justification.

After being released, Hebner debuted in Total Nonstop Action Wrestling on the December 17, 2005 episode of TNA Impact!, appearing on the stage during a match between Team 3D and The Diamonds in the Rough. Hebner left TNA in 2012.

Hebner later became the manager of The Lumberjacks of MMWA Wrestling from 2012 to 2022.

== Personal life ==
Hebner was married to his wife Rebecca, who he met as a teenager, for 43 years, beginning on September 20, 1968. They had two daughters, Christina and Becky. His identical twin brother, Earl, and nephew Brian (Earl's son) are also wrestling referees. Hebner suffered from Parkinson's disease.

In July 2016, Hebner was named part of a class action lawsuit filed against WWE which alleged that performers incurred "long term neurological injuries" and that the company "routinely failed to care" for them and "fraudulently misrepresented and concealed" the nature and extent of those injuries. The suit was litigated by attorney Konstantine Kyros, who has been involved in a number of other lawsuits against WWE. In September 2018, US District Judge Vanessa Lynne Bryant dismissed the lawsuit.

On June 17, 2022, Dave Hebner died after suffering from an illness at his home in Mechanicsville, Virginia; he was 73 years old.

== Awards and accomplishments ==
- Ground Xero Wrestling
  - GXW Hall of Fame (Class of 2016)
