= Itzuki Yamazaki =

Japanese professional wrestler (born 1966)

Personal information
- Born: January 3, 1966 (age 60) Hyōgo Prefecture, Japan

Professional wrestling career
- Ring name: Itsuki Yamazaki
- Billed height: 1.65 m (5 ft 5 in)
- Billed weight: 62 kg (137 lb)
- Trained by: AJW Dojo
- Debut: 1981
- Retired: 2017

Itzuki Yamazaki (山崎五紀, Yamazaki Itzuki; born January 3, 1966) is a retired Japanese professional wrestler who is best known as one half of the tag team Jumping Bomb Angels with Noriyo Tateno. Debuting in 1981, she worked with All Japan Women's Pro-Wrestling, the World Wrestling Federation, World Championship Wrestling, and Japanese Women's Pro until retiring in 1991.

== Professional wrestling career ==
=== All Japan Women's Pro-Wrestling ===
Yamazaki competed in All Japan Women's Pro-Wrestling in the 1980s. On February 28, 1984, she defeated Noriyo Tateno to win the AJW Championship. The title was vacated approximately one year later on February 25, 1985.

=== The Jumping Bomb Angels ===
Yamazaki teamed with Noriyo Tateno to form a tag team that initially competed in Japan. On January 5, 1986, The Angels defeated Bull Nakano and Condor Saito to win the vacant WWWA World Tag Team Championship. Then on March 20, 1986, The Crush Gals (Lioness Asuka and Chigusa Nagayo) defeated The Angels to capture the WWWA Tag Team titles.

The Angels entered the World Wrestling Federation in mid-1987 known as "The Jumping Bomb Angels". At the first ever Survivor Series, The Jumping Bomb Angels were the sole survivors in a women's Survivor Series match. During the match, they received large cheers from the audience and praise from commentators Gorilla Monsoon and Jesse Ventura especially after they dropkicked Jimmy Hart off the turnbuckle at the match's climax. On January 24, 1988 at the inaugural Royal Rumble, they beat The Glamour Girls (Leilani Kai and Judy Martin) in a two-out-of-three falls match to win the WWF Women's Tag Team Championship. The Angels would reign for 136 days until June 8, 1988 when The Glamour Girls defeated The Angels to recapture the WWF Women's Tag Team Championship.

=== Later career ===
Yamazaki retired in 1991. She made her return by making a special appearance for Ladies Legend Pro-Wrestling in 2008 and Oz Academy in 2012 and 2017.

== Personal life ==
Yamazaki lived for a time in New York City with her husband where they owned the restaurant "GO Sushi", which closed in 2013. They currently reside in Bergen County, New Jersey.

== Championships and accomplishments ==
- All Japan Women's Pro-Wrestling
  - AJW Championship (1 time)
  - WWWA World Tag Team Championship (1 time) – with Noriyo Tateno
- Women's Wrestling Hall of Fame
  - Class of 2025 – with Noriyo Tateno
- World Wrestling Federation
  - WWF Women's Tag Team Championship (1 time) – with Noriyo Tateno
