= Jumping Bomb Angels =

Professional wrestling tag team

Tag team
- Members: Noriyo Tateno; Itsuki Yamazaki
- Billed heights: 1.65 m (5 ft 5 in) - Tateno; 1.65 m (5 ft 5 in) - Yamazaki
- Combined billed weight: 130 kg (290 lb)
- Billed from: Japan
- Debut: 1981
- Disbanded: 1989
- Years active: 1981-1989

The Jumping Bomb Angels were a female Japanese professional wrestling tag team consisting of Noriyo Tateno and Itsuki Yamazaki. They competed primarily for the wrestling promotions AJW (All Japan Women’s Pro Wrestling) and WWF (World Wrestling Federation), where they held each company’s main tag team championships. They are considered ground-breaking in their style and approach to wrestling, which includes their high-flying attacks and fast-paced, hard-hitting action.

== History ==
=== All Japan Women's Pro Wrestling (1982–1989) ===
Noriyo Tateno and Itsuki Yamazaki attended the All Japan Women’s Pro Wrestling Dojo, where they graduated as part of the 1981 class. They jointly received the AJW Rookie of the Year honors.

Before forming one of the most well-known teams on the Japanese Women's Wrestling circuit, team both Noriyo Tateno and Itsuki Yamazaki competed in singles matches as well as tag & trios matches with the likes of, Chigusa Nagayo, Devil Masami, Jaguar Yokota, Mimi Hagiwara and even future rival, Judy Martin. Yamazaki would even win the AJW Championship against Tateno on February 28, 1984.

By late December 1984, Yamazaki & Tateno officially formed the Jumping Bomb Angels, aka J.B. Angels and would wrestle together more often than apart. They competed in the first AJW tag team tournament, Tag League The Best in 1985, finishing 2nd in points behind the Crush Gals, Lioness Asuka & Chigusa Nagayo. On January 5, 1986, the Jumping Bomb Angels defeated the Atrocious Alliance, Bull Nakano and Condor Saito to win the vacant WWWA World Tag Team Championship in a best two-out-of-three falls match. They later lost the titles on March 20, 1986, to the Crush Gals. The Jumping Bomb Angels would take toured the United States from mid 1987 to 1988. They returned to Japan, where they lost the WWF Ladies’s Tag Team Championships to The Glamour Girls, Judy Martin and Leilani Kai at an AJW event on June 8, 1988.

Noriyo Tateno and Itsuki Yamazaki would continue to compete in AJW together and separately for the next year. On May 14, 1989, Tateno and Yamazaki faced each other in Itsuki Yamazaki’s AJW Retirement match, which ended in a time limit draw.

=== World Wrestling Federation (1987–1988) ===
The Jumping Bomb Angels entered the World Wrestling Federation appearing on WWF Prime Time June 24th and July 16th, 1987 facing off against the Glamour Girls, Judy Martin & Leilani Kai. The 2 tag teams would feud and have matches across the house show circuit for the next 6 months with the Glamour Girls, winning most of the encounters thanks to interference from their manager, Jimmy Hart.

At the very first WWF Survivor Series on Thanksgiving, November 26th 1987, the Jumping Bomb Angels teamed with The Fabulous Moolah, Velvet McIntyre, & Rockin' Robin to face the team of Sherri Martel, Dawn Marie, Donna Christianello, Judy Martin & Leilani Kai. Noriyo Tateno and Itsuki Yamazaki would go on to win the match as the sole survivors in the first ever women's Survivor Series match.

On January 24, 1988 at the inaugural Royal Rumble, the Jumping Bomb Angels beat The Glamour Girls (in a best two-out-of-three falls match) to win the WWF Ladies Tag Team Championship. They would continue their feud at house shows throughout America with the Angels now winning all of the encounters. They would even have a singles match a piece, Yamazaki beating Judy Martin and Tateno defeating Leilani Kai. The Jumping Bomb Angels returned to Japan with their home promotion of All Japan Women’s Pro Wrestling. It was there that they lost the WWF Ladies Tag Team Championship, back to the Glamour Girls via countout on June 8, 1988.

=== Reunion (2008) ===
The Jumping Bomb Angels would reunite at Daily Sports’ 60th Anniversary event, Summer Dream on July 21st, 2008. They would take on the team of Jumbo Hori & Yukari Omori and on August 3rd they wrestled the Double Inoue team consisting of Kyoko & Takako Inoue. Both ending in time limit draws. The Jumping Bomb Angels would next compete for Ladies Legend Pro Wrestling-X, against old foes, Devil Masami & Jaguar Yokota at LLPW Revolution 16 on August 10th. Noriyo Tateno and Itsuki Yamazaki would conclude their reunion tour on August 16th at Pro Wrestling WAVE’s 1st Anniversary event, WAVE Sail A-Way 2. Their opponents were Ran Yu-Yu & Toshie Uematsu. This was the Jumping Bomb Angels last match together.

=== Music career ===
Much like AJW wrestlers before and after them, including the Beauty Pair and the Crush Gals, Noriyo Tateno and Itsuki Yamazaki embarked on a musical career as the J.B. Angels. They were signed to CBS/ Sony Records and released three, 7” singles in 1986: (Chance)³/ Stand In The Shadow Emblem of Youth/ Never Surrender ! Stardust Dance Heaven/ Get Wings/ Love Of My Life. They later released a full length LP, First Flight in 1987.

== Championships and accomplishments ==
- All Japan Women's Pro-Wrestling
  - WWWA World Tag Team Championship (1 time)
- Women's Wrestling Hall of Fame
  - Class of 2025
- World Wrestling Federation
  - WWF Women's Tag Team Championship (1 time)
- Independent
  - Women's World Tag Team Championship (1 time)
