= Noriyo Tateno =

Japanese professional wrestler (born 1965)

Personal information
- Born: December 1, 1965 (age 60) Ashikaga, Tochigi, Japan
- Children: 2

Professional wrestling career
- Ring name: Noriyo Tateno
- Billed height: 1.65 m (5 ft 5 in)
- Billed weight: 75 kg (165 lb)
- Debut: July 12, 1981
- Retired: October 10, 2010

Noriyo Tateno (立野 記代, Tateno Noriyo) (born December 1, 1965) is a Japanese retired professional wrestler who is best known as one half of the tag team Jumping Bomb Angels with Itsuki Yamazaki. She worked in All Japan Women's Pro-Wrestling, WWF and has been working in Ladies Legend Pro-Wrestling since 1992, until her retirement in 2010.

== Professional wrestling career ==
=== All Japan Women's Pro-Wrestling (1981-1992) ===
Tateno competed in All Japan Women's Pro-Wrestling in the 1980s. On August 10, 1982, she defeated Chigusa Nagayo to win the AJW Junior Championship, which she held until January 8, 1984 when she lost it to Nagayo. On February 28, 1984, she was defeated by future partner Itsuki Yamazaki for the AJW Championship.

Tateno also held the All Pacific Championship in All Japan. She defeated Bull Nakano for the title on November 13, 1989 and held it until April 30, 1990, when she was defeated by Aja Kong.

=== The Jumping Bomb Angels (1982-1989) ===
Tateno teamed with Itsuki Yamazaki to form a tag team that initially competed in Japan. On January 5, 1986, The Angels defeated Bull Nakano and Condor Saito to win the vacant WWWA World Tag Team Championship. Then on March 20, 1986, The Crush Gals (Lioness Asuka and Chigusa Nagayo) defeated The Angels to capture the WWWA Tag Team titles.

The Angels entered the World Wrestling Federation in mid-1987 known as "The Jumping Bomb Angels". At the first ever Survivor Series, The Jumping Bomb Angels were the sole survivors in a women's Survivor Series match. During the match, they received large cheers from the audience and praise from commentators Gorilla Monsoon and Jesse Ventura especially after they dropkicked Jimmy Hart off the turnbuckle at the match's climax. On January 24, 1988 at the inaugural Royal Rumble, they beat The Glamour Girls (Leilani Kai and Judy Martin) in a two-out-of-three falls match to win the WWF Women's Tag Team Championship. The Angels would reign for 136 days until June 8, 1988 when The Glamour Girls defeated The Angels to recapture the WWF Women's Tag Team Championship.

=== Ladies Legend Pro Wrestling (1992-2010) ===
From 1992 until her retirement in 2010, Tateno competed in Ladies Legend Pro-Wrestling.

== Championships and accomplishments ==
- All Japan Women's Pro-Wrestling
  - AJW Junior Championship (1 time)
  - All Pacific Championship (1 time)
  - WWWA World Tag Team Championship (1 time) – with Itsuki Yamazaki
- Ladies Legend Pro-Wrestling
  - LLPW Singles Championship (1 time)
  - LLPW Six-Woman Tag Team Championship (2 times) – with Rumi Kazama and Yasha Kurenai (1) and Keiko Aono and Harley Saito (1)
  - LLPW Tag Team Championship (1 time) – with Eagle Sawai
- Ladies Professional Wrestling Association
  - LPWA Tag Team Championship (1 time) - with Eagle Sawai
- Women's Wrestling Hall of Fame
  - Class of 2025 – with Itsuki Yamazaki
- World Wrestling Federation
  - WWF Women's Tag Team Championship (1 time) – with Itsuki Yamazaki
