= SuperBrawl II =

1992 World Championship Wrestling pay-per-view event

- Promotional poster featuring Lex Luger and Sting
- Promotion: World Championship Wrestling
- Date: February 29, 1992
- City: Milwaukee, Wisconsin
- Venue: Milwaukee Auditorium
- Attendance: 5,000
- Buy rate: 160,000
- Tagline: Best Friends Now Bitter Rivals Brawl For It All

Pay-per-view chronology
← Previous; WCW/New Japan Supershow II	Next → WrestleWar

SuperBrawl chronology
← Previous; I	Next → III

SuperBrawl II was the second SuperBrawl professional wrestling pay-per-view (PPV) event produced by World Championship Wrestling (WCW). The event took place on February 29, 1992, from the Milwaukee Auditorium in Milwaukee, Wisconsin.

Nine matches took place at the event, with one being a dark match. The main event was a singles match between Lex Luger and Sting for the WCW World Heavyweight Championship. Sting pinned Luger to win the match and win the title. This would be Luger's final match in WCW until 1995; he joined the World Bodybuilding Federation (WBF) and later the World Wrestling Federation (WWF) after this match. Other featured matches on the card were Rick Rude versus Ricky Steamboat for the United States Heavyweight Championship, Jushin Liger versus Brian Pillman for the Light Heavyweight Championship, Arn Anderson and Bobby Eaton versus The Steiner Brothers for the World Tag Team Championship and Barry Windham and Dustin Rhodes versus Larry Zbyszko and Steve Austin in a tag team match.

== Production ==
=== Background ===
At the Starrcade pay-per-view on December 29, 1991, WCW announced that the SuperBrawl II pay-per-view event would take place on February 29, 1992.

=== Storylines ===
The event featured wrestlers from pre-existing scripted feuds and storylines.

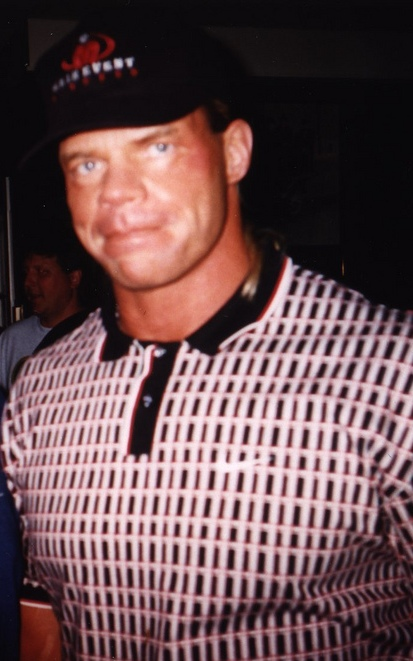
Lex Luger was the defending WCW World Heavyweight Champion at SuperBrawl II.

At Clash of the Champions XVII, then-WCW United States Heavyweight Champion Sting received the last of a series of three packages containing wrestlers who attacked him – this last being his former friend, WCW World Heavyweight Champion Lex Luger who reinjured Sting's knee so badly that it contributed heavily to his title loss to Rick Rude later that night. Sting recuperated from the injury and at Starrcade, he last eliminated Luger to win the Battlebowl battle royal. At Clash of the Champions XVIII, the new Executive Vice President of WCW, Kip Allan Frey announced that Luger would defend the title against Sting in the main event at SuperBrawl II.

At the 1991 Halloween Havoc, Brian Pillman defeated Richard Morton in the finals of a tournament to become the inaugural Light Heavyweight Champion. On December 25, Pillman lost the title to Jushin Liger. On the February 1 episode of World Championship Wrestling, it was announced that Liger would defend the title against Pillman in a rematch at SuperBrawl II.

At Clash of the Champions XVIII, Sting and Ricky Steamboat defeated Rude and Steve Austin in a tag team match. Rude and Austin attacked their opponents after the match, with Rude delivering two Rude Awakenings to Steamboat. On the February 1 episode of World Championship Wrestling, it was announced that Rude would defend the WCW United States Heavyweight Champion against Steamboat at SuperBrawl II. On the February 22 episode of World Championship Wrestling, the team of Sting, Steamboat, Barry Windham and Dustin Rhodes defeated Rude, Austin, Arn Anderson and Bobby Eaton in an eight-man tag team match. After the match, Rude executed a Rude Awakening to Steamboat.

At Halloween Havoc, Barry Windham was supposed to compete in a Chamber of Horrors match on Abdullah the Butcher's team but The Enforcers (Larry Zbyszko and Arn Anderson) slammed the car door on his hand to injure him. At Clash of the Champions XVII, Windham was supposed to team with Dustin Rhodes to challenge Enforcers for the WCW World Tag Team Championship but Windham was replaced by Ricky Steamboat due to his injury. Windham returned from his injury on the December 14 episode of Pro to dispute the call after Anderson and Bobby Eaton had cheated to defeat Michael Hayes and Jimmy Garvin but he was attacked by members of The Dangerous Alliance. Windham would then frequently team with Steamboat and Rhodes to feud with members of Dangerous Alliance as they fought several matches throughout the following months. On the February 8 episode of Worldwide, it was announced that Windham and Rhodes would take on Steve Austin and Larry Zbyszko in a tag team match at SuperBrawl II.

On January 1, Sting and Ron Simmons defeated Rick Rude and Cactus Jack after Jack lost when his ally Abdullah the Butcher accidentally hit him with the kendo stick. This ignited a feud between Jack and Butcher. On the January 19 episode of Main Event, Simmons defeated Jack via disqualification after Zbyszko interfered and Butcher made the save for Simmons to brawl with Jack and Zbyszko. This would lead to Simmons and Jack competing in several tag team matches for the next one month. On the February 8 episode of Worldwide, it was announced that Simmons would face Jack in a match at SuperBrawl II.

On the February 1 episode of World Championship Wrestling, Terrance Taylor slapped Marcus Alexander Bagwell after Bagwell won his match and ordered him to leave the ring to cut a promo. Two weeks later on World Championship Wrestling, Taylor offered Bagwell to mentor him but Bagwell refused his offer which led to Taylor attacking Bagwell and Greg Valentine made his WCW debut and aided Taylor in attacking Bagwell. This led to a match between Bagwell and Taylor at SuperBrawl.

On the February 8 episode of Worldwide, Gordon Solie announced several matches during his Wrestling News Network segment to take place at SuperBrawl II including Arn Anderson and Bobby Eaton would defend the tag team titles against Steiner Brothers and Tom Zenk would take on Richard Morton.

== Event ==
Other on-screen personnel
Role:	Name:
Presenters	Tony Schiavone
Presenters	Eric Bischoff
Commentators	Jim Ross
Commentators	Jesse Ventura
Interviewer	Missy Hyatt
Referees	Mike Atkins
Referees	Nick Patrick
Referees	Randy Anderson
Ring announcers	Gary Michael Cappetta
Ring announcers	Barry Abrams

Before the event aired live on pay-per-view, Big Josh defeated Diamond Dallas Page in a non-televised match.

=== Preliminary matches ===
In the opening match, Jushin Liger defended the WCW Light Heavyweight Championship against Brian Pillman. Pillman pinned Liger with a cradle after avoiding a diving headbutt by Liger.

Next, Marcus Alexander Bagwell took on Terrence Taylor. Contest winner Barry Abrams from Syracuse University served as the special guest ring announcer for this match. Bagwell pinned Taylor with a sunset flip for the win.

Next, Ron Simmons took on Cactus Jack. Near the end of the match, Jack climbed the top rope and dived off the turnbuckle to perform an aerial move on Simmons but Simmons countered with a powerslam for the win. After the match, Abdullah the Butcher attacked Simmons until Junkyard Dog made his surprise return to WCW and saved Simmons from a double-team assault by Butcher and Jack.

The next match was scheduled to be a singles match between Tom Zenk and Richard Morton but was quietly changed into a tag team match as Zenk teamed with Van Hammer to take on Morton and Vinnie Vegas. Zenk pinned Morton with a sunset flip for the win after Morton was hit into the turnbuckle.

Next, Barry Windham and Dustin Rhodes took on The Dangerous Alliance team of Steve Austin and Larry Zbyszko. After being double teamed by Austin and Zbyszko for most of the match, Windham performed a diving lariat on Zbyszko for the win.

Later, the team of Arn Anderson and Bobby Eaton defended the WCW World Tag Team Championship against the Steiner Brothers. Near the end of the match, Anderson blinded Rick Steiner by throwing powder in his eyes and a blinded Steiner accidentally suplexed the referee, allowing Scott Steiner to tag in and hit a Frankensteiner to Eaton to win the titles as the new referee counted the pinfall. However, the original referee reversed the decision and disqualified Steiners, resulting in Anderson and Eaton retaining the titles.

In the final match on the undercard, Rick Rude defended the WCW United States Heavyweight Championship against Ricky Steamboat. Dangerous Alliance manager Paul E. Dangerously was banned from ringside by Kip Frey. Near the end of the match, Dangerously - under the disguise of a "masked ninja" - attacked Steamboat by hitting him with a phone, allowing Rude to pin him to retain the title.

=== Main event match ===
In the main event, Lex Luger defended the World Heavyweight Championship against Sting. Near the end of the match, Sting attempted to hit a diving crossbody to Luger but fell outside the ring where Luger's manager Harley Race tried to interfere but Sting attacked him and then delivered a diving crossbody to Luger to win the title.

== Reception ==
SuperBrawl II received mixed to positive reviews. According to Scott Keith of 411Mania, the event "was just dripping with effort and commitment (besides Luger)", while praising "Windham/Rhodes v. Zbyszko/Austin match and the shockingly-good Morton/Vegas v. Hammer/Zenk match". J.D. Dunn of 411Mania gave a rating of 7 out of 10 to the event, considering it a good event as he wrote "This show has the reputation as a classic, but it doesn't hold up as well as I thought it would. It started out hot and had a few good tag matches, but the final two matches were disappointing. It still merits a thumbs up with the way-ahead-of-its-time light-heavyweight match and the Sting win, but it's not one of the great all-time PPVs that people remember."

Kyle DaCosta of E Wrestling News wrote "This was great effort by the wrestlers and another well-booked show by WCW at this time." Paul Matthews of Culture Crossfire praised the Light Heavyweight Championship match, considering Pillman and Liger to be the performers of the night, while considering "Almost every match ranged from decent to great." He criticized the "return of the Dusty Finish", "(Kevin) Nash’s awkward wrestling" and "Lex Luger’s poor conditioning and attitude." According to him, the event was overall "a very solid PPV. There was nothing on it that was terrible and there were a couple of matches that were great." According to Sage Cortez of Culture Crossfire, "This is a fantastic show, one of WCW’s best. Only thing holding it back from a higher rating was the title match, which didn’t deliver." According to him, the Light Heavyweight Championship "match was innovative and a harbinger of the style to come" while the World Heavyweight Championship match "wasn’t of the quality needed out of a title match".

== Aftermath ==
SuperBrawl II was Lex Luger's final appearance in WCW as he departed the promotion to pursue a bodybuilding career in the World Bodybuilding Federation (WBF) and jumped ship to rival promotion World Wrestling Federation (WWF) in 1993. Luger returned to WCW three years later on the debut episode of Monday Nitro on September 4, 1995.

On the March 7 episode of World Championship Wrestling, Rick Rude threw a drink in Sting's face during a press conference, which led to a feud between Sting and the Dangerous Alliance. Ricky Steamboat, Barry Windham and Dustin Rhodes resumed their rivalry with Dangerous Alliance after SuperBrawl and joined Sting and Nikita Koloff to defeat the Dangerous Alliance in a WarGames match at WrestleWar. Sting held the World Heavyweight Championship until The Great American Bash, where he lost the title to Big Van Vader. Steamboat and Rude's rivalry culminated in an Iron Man match at Beach Blast, which Steamboat won.

The feud between Ron Simmons and Cactus Jack continued after SuperBrawl as Jack joined forces with Mr. Hughes to feud with Simmons and his new ally Junkyard Dog. A tag team match was supposed to take place between the two teams at WrestleWar but Jack attacked JYD before the match rendering him unable to compete and Simmons defeated Hughes in a singles match.

Arn Anderson and Bobby Eaton continued their feud with Steiner Brothers over the World Tag Team Championship after the event. On the April 11 episode of Pro, it was announced that Anderson and Eaton would defend the titles against Steiners in a steel cage match at a house show on May 3. Steiners would win the titles. Steiners would then defeat Takayuki Iizuka and Tatsumi Fujinami at WrestleWar to become the number one contenders for the IWGP Tag Team Championship.

Brian Pillman would successfully defend the Light Heavyweight Championship against Tom Zenk at WrestleWar. He would hold the title until Beach Blast, where he lost the title to Scotty Flamingo.

== Home media and streaming ==
The event was released on home video in the United States and the United Kingdom by Turner Home Entertainment.The event was edited down to two hours and three matches were removed. These were Marcus Alexander Bagwell versus Terry Taylor, Ron Simmons versus Cactus Jack, and Van Hammer and Z-Man versus Richard Morton and Vinnie Vegas.

In 2014, the event was included on the WWE's streaming platform the WWE Network as part of its launch and remained on the service until the platform closed in 2026. In August 2025, WWE uploaded the event to stream freely on their WCW YouTube channel.

== Results ==
No.	Results	Stipulations	Times
1^{D}	Big Josh defeated Diamond Dallas Page	Singles match	7:36
2	Brian Pillman defeated Jushin Liger (c)	Singles match for the WCW Light Heavyweight Championship	17:00
3	Marcus Alexander Bagwell defeated Terrance Taylor	Singles match	7:38
4	Ron Simmons defeated Cactus Jack	Singles match	6:34
5	Van Hammer and Z-Man defeated Richard Morton and Vinnie Vegas	Tag team match	12:01
6	Barry Windham and Dustin Rhodes defeated Steve Austin and Larry Zbyszko (with Madusa)	Tag team match	18:23
7	Arn Anderson and Bobby Eaton (c) defeated The Steiner Brothers (Rick Steiner and Scott Steiner) by disqualification	Tag team match for the WCW World Tag Team Championship	20:06
8	Rick Rude (c) defeated Ricky Steamboat	Singles match for the WCW United States Heavyweight Championship	20:02
9	Sting defeated Lex Luger (c) (with Harley Race)	Singles match for the WCW World Heavyweight Championship	13:02
(c) / – the champion(s) heading into the match; D / – this was a dark match
