= Crazy like a Fox =

The phrase "crazy like a fox" may refer to:

- Crazy like a Fox (1926 film), a 1926 film starring Charley Chase
- Crazy Like a Fox: The Definitive Chronicle of Brian Pillman 20 Years Later, a 2017 book by Liam O'Rourke
- Crazy Like a Fox (TV series), an American television series (1984–1986)
  - Still Crazy Like a Fox, a 1987 American television movie that was a spinoff of the television series
- Crazy like a Fox (2004 film), a dramatic comedy starring Roger Rees
- "Crazy like a Fox", a song by Keith Moon from the album Two Sides of the Moon
- Crazy like a Fox (1944 book), an Armed Services Edition
- Crazy like a Fox, a 1944 book by S. J. Perelman
