= WrestleWar '92 =

1992 World Championship Wrestling pay-per-view event

- VHS cover featuring Sting's Squadron and The Dangerous Alliance
- Promotion: World Championship Wrestling
- Date: May 17, 1992
- City: Jacksonville, Florida
- Venue: Jacksonville Memorial Coliseum
- Attendance: 6,000
- Buy rate: 105,000
- Tagline(s): Destroy or be destroyed! One team will stand! One team will fall! In a match so brutal it can happen only once a year!

Pay-per-view chronology
← Previous; SuperBrawl II	Next → Beach Blast

WrestleWar chronology
← Previous; 1991	Next → Final

WrestleWar '92 was the fourth and final WrestleWar professional wrestling pay-per-view (PPV) event produced by World Championship Wrestling (WCW). It took place on May 17, 1992, from the Jacksonville Memorial Coliseum in Jacksonville, Florida in the United States. In 1993, WrestleWar was replaced by Slamboree as the May PPV and the event’s WarGames match moved to September’s Fall Brawl.

Ten matches were contested at the event including one dark match. The main event was a WarGames match, in which Sting's Squadron (Sting, Barry Windham, Dustin Rhodes, Ricky Steamboat and Nikita Koloff) defeated The Dangerous Alliance (Steve Austin, Rick Rude, Arn Anderson, Bobby Eaton and Larry Zbyszko). Other featured matches on the card were Brian Pillman versus Tom Zenk for the Light Heavyweight Championship, Terry Taylor and Greg Valentine versus The Freebirds (Jimmy Garvin and Michael Hayes) and The Steiner Brothers (Rick Steiner and Scott Steiner) versus Tatsumi Fujinami and Takayuki Iizuka to determine the number one contenders for the IWGP Tag Team Championship.

== Storylines ==
The event featured wrestlers from pre-existing scripted feuds and storylines. Wrestlers portrayed villains, heroes, or less distinguishable characters in the scripted events that built tension and culminated in a wrestling match or series of matches.

At SuperBrawl II, Sting defeated Lex Luger in the main event to win the WCW World Heavyweight Championship. Also at the event, Dangerous Alliance member Rick Rude successfully defended the United States Heavyweight Championship against Ricky Steamboat while Barry Windham and Dustin Rhodes defeated Alliance members Steve Austin and Larry Zbyszko in a tag team match. On the March 7 episode of World Championship Wrestling, Sting discussed his potential contenders for the title during a SuperBrawl II press conference until Dangerous Alliance interrupted him and Rude threw a drink in Sting's face which led to a brawl between Sting and Dangerous Alliance and Nikita Koloff made his return to WCW by coming to Sting's rescue. Steamboat continued his feud with Rude while Windham and Rhodes also resumed their rivalry with Austin and Zbyszko. On the March 21 episode of Worldwide, Big Van Vader attacked Sting after his match, causing Sting to suffer a rib injury and be out of action. Koloff would reveal his allegiance to Sting on the April 25 episode of Saturday Night by considering Sting his favorite wrestler. This would lead to a WarGames match between Sting's Squadron (Sting, Nikita Koloff, Barry Windham, Dustin Rhodes and Ricky Steamboat against Dangerous Alliance at WrestleWar.

On the April 11 episode of Saturday Night, Terry Taylor and Greg Valentine defeated The Freebirds (Michael Hayes and Jimmy Garvin) in a two out of three falls match to retain the United States Tag Team Championship. Two weeks later, on the April 25 episode of Saturday Night, Eric Bischoff announced that Taylor and Valentine would be defending the titles against Hayes and Garvin at WrestleWar.

== Event ==
Other on-screen personnel
Role:	Name:
Presenters	Tony Schiavone
Presenters	Eric Bischoff
Commentator	Jim Ross
Commentator	Jesse Ventura
Ring announcer	Gary Michael Cappetta
Referees	Bill Alfonso
Referees	Randy Anderson
Referees	Mike Adkins

The opening bout was a tag team match pitting Bob Cook and Firebreaker Chip against Diamond Dallas Page and Thomas Rich. The match was won by Page and Rich. This was a dark match which did not air on the pay-per-view broadcast.

The second bout saw WCW United States Tag Team Champions Greg Valentine and Terry Taylor defend their titles against The Freebirds (Jimmy Garvin and Michael Hayes). The Freebirds won the titles after Garvin gave Taylor a DDT and then pinned him.

The third bout was a singles match between Johnny B. Badd and Tracy Smothers. Badd won the match by pinfall after knocking Smothers out with a punch.

Following the third bout, a vignette aired in which the Freebirds celebrated winning the WCW United States Tag Team Championship with the returning Precious.

The fourth bout was a singles match between Marcus Alexander Bagwell and Scotty Flamingo. Flamingo won the bout by pinfall using a roll-up.

The fifth bout was scheduled to be a tag team match pitting Cactus Jack and Mr. Hughes against Junkyard Dog and Ron Simmons. However, Cactus Jack attacked Junkyard Dog before the match, leading to the match being changed to a singles match between Hughes and Simmons. Simmons won the match by pinning Hughes following a chop block.

The sixth bout was a singles match between Super Invader and Todd Champion. Super Invader won the bout by pinning Champion following a powerbomb.

The seventh bout was a singles match between Big Josh and Richard Morton (with Morton replacing The Diamond Studd, who had departed WCW shortly before WrestleWar '92). Big Josh won the bout by pinfall following a diving seated senton.

The eighth bout saw WCW Light Heavyweight Champion Brian Pillman defend his title against Tom Zenk. Pillman pinned Zenk using a roll-up to retain his title.

The eighth bout was a tag team match pitting The Steiner Brothers (Rick Steiner and Scott Steiner) against Takayuki Iizuka and Tatsumi Fujinami, with the winners to be named the number one contenders for the IWGP Tag Team Championship. The Steiner Brothers won the match when Rick Steiner pinned Iizuka following a super overhead belly-to-belly suplex.

The main event was a WarGames match pitting Sting's Squadron (Barry Windham, Dustin Rhodes, Nikita Koloff, Ricky Steamboat, and Sting) against The Dangerous Alliance (Arn Anderson, Bobby Eaton, Larry Zbyszko, Rick Rude, and Steve Austin). The match ended when Zbyszko accidentally hit Eaton in the shoulder with the metal connector from a turnbuckle, enabling Sting to apply an armbar to Eaton and force him to submit.

== Aftermath ==
Steiner Brothers received their IWGP Tag Team Championship at a New Japan Pro-Wrestling show on June 26, 1992, where they defeated Big, Bad and Dangerous (Big Van Vader and Bam Bam Bigelow) to win the IWGP Tag Team Championship. On July 5, Steiner Brothers lost their WCW World Tag Team Championship to Terry Gordy and Steve Williams at a live event.

== Home media and streaming ==
The event was released on home video in the United States and the United Kingdom by Turner Home Entertainment. In the UK, it was released in summer 1993. The event was edited down to under two hours and four matches were cut. These were Johnny B. Badd versus Tracy Smothers, Scotty Flamingo versus Marcus Alexander Bagwell, Super Invader versus Todd Champion, and Big Josh versus Richard Morton.

In 2014, the event was included on the WWE's streaming platform the WWE Network as part of its launch and remained on the service until the platform closed in 2026. In May 2026, WWE uploaded the event to stream freely on their WCW YouTube channel.

== Results ==
No.	Results	Stipulations	Times
1^{D}	Diamond Dallas Page and Thomas Rich defeated Bob Cook and Firebreaker Chip	Tag team match	08:05
2	The Freebirds (Michael Hayes and Jimmy Garvin) defeated Terry Taylor and Greg Valentine (c)	Tag team match for the WCW United States Tag Team Championship	16:02
3	Johnny B. Badd defeated Tracy Smothers	Singles match	07:03
4	Scotty Flamingo defeated Marcus Alexander Bagwell	Singles match	07:11
5	Ron Simmons defeated Mr. Hughes (with Cactus Jack)	Singles match	05:22
6	Super Invader (with Harley Race) defeated Todd Champion	Singles match	05:26
7	Big Josh defeated Richard Morton	Singles match	07:33
8	Brian Pillman (c) defeated Tom Zenk	Singles match for the WCW Light Heavyweight Championship	15:30
9	The Steiner Brothers (Rick Steiner and Scott Steiner) defeated Takayuki Iizuka and Tatsumi Fujinami	Tag team match to determine #1 contenders for the IWGP Tag Team Championship	18:17
10	Sting's Squadron (Sting, Barry Windham, Dustin Rhodes, Ricky Steamboat and Nikita Koloff) defeated The Dangerous Alliance (Steve Austin, Rick Rude, Arn Anderson, Bobby Eaton and Larry Zbyszko) (with Madusa and Paul E. Dangerously)	WarGames match	23:27
(c) / – the champion(s) heading into the match; D / – this was a dark match
