= WCW Light Heavyweight Championship =

Former professional wrestling title

- The championship belt

Details
- Promotion: National Wrestling Alliance; World Championship Wrestling
- Date established: October 27, 1991
- Date retired: September 2, 1992
Statistics
- First champion: Brian Pillman
- Final champion: Brad Armstrong
- Most reigns: Brian Pillman (2)
- Longest reign: Brian Pillman (112 days)
- Shortest reign: Scotty Flamingo (15 days)

The WCW Light Heavyweight Championship was a professional wrestling championship that was contested in World Championship Wrestling (WCW) between 1991 and 1992. Conceived in 1991, the championship was first awarded as the result of a single-elimination tournament; its subsequent lineage ended when the final champion Brad Armstrong was stripped of the title due to injury. A second tournament to decide Armstrong's successor was announced, but never took place. The title was held by four different champions; the inaugural champion Brian Pillman was the only wrestler to win it on more than one occasion.

The light heavyweight division which contested the championship had proved popular with fans, but its viability suffered as a result of WCW's creative decisions; in 1992, Bill Watts became the head booker, and implemented storyline changes in WCW's product which stymied the division's style. WCW would later introduce a similar title as the WCW Cruiserweight Championship; the two titles are now considered to share the same lineage by the wrestling promotion WWE, which purchased WCW's assets in 2001.

== Overview ==
=== Creation ===
The WCW Light Heavyweight Championship was created in 1991, with the inaugural champion decided though a single-elimination tournament held over several weeks. Seven wrestlers were used for the tournament—three quarter final matches, one of whom entered at the semi-final stages. The first two quarter finals were broadcast on WorldWide in August 1991, and saw The York Foundation's Richard Morton defeat Johnny Rich, and Badstreet defeat Joey Maggs. The next month, WCW's Main Event featured the last quarter final, in which Mike Graham triumphed over another York Foundation member in Terrance Taylor.

Both of the semi-final matches were held at September's Clash of the Champions XVI event in Augusta, Georgia; Morton defeated Graham in a heel finish which depicted him using several illegal advantages to win. In the other leg of the tournament, Badstreet was defeated by the newly-entering Brian Pillman with a body press from the top rope. Morton and Pillman contested the final round at the 1991 Halloween Havoc event, held in Chattanooga, Tennessee; Pillman won the match and championship with another top rope body press.

=== Inaugural championship tournament ===
Quarter finals
WorldWide
Richard Morton
Johnny Rich
Main Event
Terrence Taylor
Mike Graham
WorldWide
Badstreet
Joey Maggs

Semi finals
Clash of the Champions XVI
Richard Morton	Pin
Mike Graham	7:40
Badstreet	Pin
Brian Pillman	6:52

Final
Halloween Havoc
Richard Morton	Pin
Brian Pillman	12:43

=== Defending the title ===
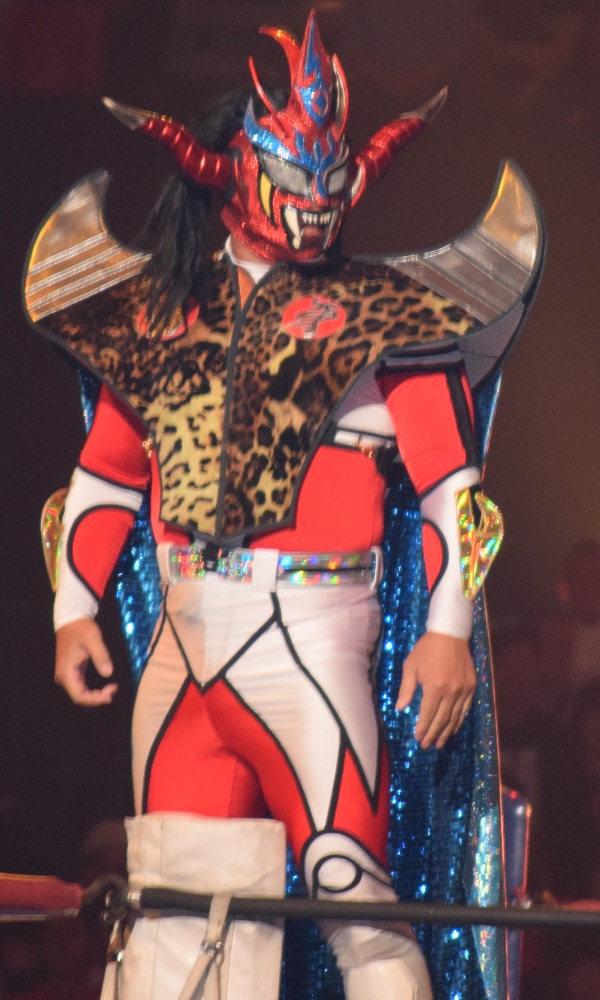
Former WCW Light Heavyweight Champion Jushin Thunder Liger, pictured in 2015

Pillman's reign as champion continued until December 1991, when he began to feud with masked Japanese wrestler Jushin Thunder Liger, who defeated Pillman for the championship at a house show held in Atlanta, Georgia on December 25, 1991. Pillman reclaimed the title in a rematch at the SuperBrawl II pay-per-view event on February 29 the following year in Milwaukee, Wisconsin, becoming the only wrestler to hold the championship more than once.

Pillman successfully defended the championship against Tom Zenk at the May 17 WrestleWar event in Jacksonville, Florida, before being defeated by Scotty Flamingo in Mobile, Alabama, during the June 20 Beach Blast pay-per-view. Flamingo's brief reign was ended by Brad Armstrong during a house show; the match was filmed out-of-sequence with several other televised championship matches, which meant Flamingo would tape a defense against Scott Sandlin despite having already lost the championship, while Armstrong recorded a match against Tracy Smothers that would air as a title defense despite being shot before his win was officially acknowledged. Armstrong's reign saw the return of Liger as a challenger; they fought on several occasions, either with Armstrong winning or the match ending in a draw. Armstrong's last successful defense of the Light Heavyweight Championship was against Flamingo on August 14 in Fort Myers, Florida.

=== Vacancy and legacy ===
As the September 1992 Clash of the Champions XX approached, Armstrong suffered a knee injury in a match with The Great Muta during a tour with New Japan Pro-Wrestling, and was unable to participate in a planned title match against Pillman at the event. Armstrong was formally stripped of the belt at Clash of the Champions, depicted as the result of him not defending it for thirty days, and another tournament to appoint a new champion was announced. However, Bill Watts had taken over the role of head booker for WCW and began to implement several changes in the work being produced. Among Watts' edicts was a new rule that would depict any maneuver performed from the top rope of the ring as illegal and resulting in disqualification; this effectively ended the viability of the light heavyweight style, which relied extensively on such moves, even though the matches involved in the championship picture had been considered "outstanding" by the fans. As a result, the planned tournament was never held and the light heavyweight division was ignored for the remainder of Watts' tenure.

In 1996, WCW once again held a tournament to crown a champion for the weight class, this time under the title WCW Cruiserweight Championship. The first champion under this new lineage was Shinjiro Otani, who defeated Chris Benoit in the tournament final. After the acquisition of WCW's assets by rival company WWE, both title lineages were considered to be related, and WWE refers to the holders of the Light Heavyweight Championship as former Cruiserweight Champions.

== Reigns ==
Key
No.	Overall reign number
Reign	Reign number for the specific champion
Days	Number of days held

No.	Champion	Championship change			Reign statistics		Notes	Ref.
No.	Champion	Date	Event	Location	Reign	Days	Notes	Ref.
1	Brian Pillman	October 27, 1991	Halloween Havoc	Chattanooga, TN	1	59	Pillman defeated Richard Morton in the finals of a tournament to decide the inaugural champion.	
2	Jushin Thunder Liger	December 25, 1991	House show	Atlanta, GA	1	66		
3	Brian Pillman	February 29, 1992	SuperBrawl II	Milwaukee, WI	2	112		
4	Scotty Flamingo	June 20, 1992	Beach Blast	Mobile, AL	1	15		
5	Brad Armstrong	July 5, 1992	House show	Atlanta, GA	1	59		
—	Deactivated	September 2, 1992	Clash of the Champions XX: 20th Anniversary	Atlanta, GA	—	—	The championship was vacated due to Brad Armstrong's injury; a tournament to crown a new champion was announced, but never held.	

== Combined reigns ==
Rank	Wrestler	No. of reigns	Combined days
1	Brian Pillman	2	171
2	Jushin Thunder Liger	1	66
3	Brad Armstrong	1	59
4	Scotty Flamingo	1	15

== See also ==
- NWA World Junior Heavyweight Championship, predecessor in Jim Crockett Promotions
- WWF Light Heavyweight Championship
- NXT Cruiserweight Championship
