= Beach Blast (1992) =

1992 World Championship Wrestling pay-per-view event

- Promotion: World Championship Wrestling
- Date: June 20, 1992
- City: Mobile, Alabama
- Venue: Mobile Civic Center
- Attendance: 5,000
- Buy rate: 70,000
- Tagline: World Championship Wrestling Beats The Heat!

Pay-per-view chronology
← Previous; WrestleWar	Next → The Great American Bash

Beach Blast chronology
← Previous; First	Next → 1993

The 1992 Beach Blast was the inaugural Beach Blast professional wrestling pay-per-view event produced by World Championship Wrestling (WCW). It took place on June 20, 1992 in the Mobile Civic Center in Mobile, Alabama.

The show included two main events: Ricky Steamboat and Rick Rude faced off in a 30-minute Iron Man Challenge as the culmination of a long running feud, and The Steiner Brothers defended their WCW World Tag Team Championship against Terry Gordy and Steve Williams.

== Production ==
=== Background ===
In 1992 the Atlanta, Georgia based World Championship Wrestling (WCW) professional wrestling promotion increased their pay-per-view (PPV) shows from six in 1991 to seven in 1992. As part of the expansion WCW came up with the concept of "Beach Blast". As part of the show's beach theme the Mobile Civic Center was decked out like a beach, complete with sand dunes around the entrance. surfboards and other surfing images.

The show took place only four days after WCW held Clash of the Champions XIX, free to cable subscribers.

The show was one of the first major events held after Bill Watts had been put in charge of WCW and would be the first show where a number of Watts' new rules would be enforced, including any move that included jumping off the top rope would result in a disqualification.

=== Storylines ===
The event featured wrestlers from pre-existing scripted feuds and storylines. Wrestlers portrayed villains, heroes, or less distinguishable characters in the scripted events that built tension and culminated in a wrestling match or series of matches.

Other on-screen personnel
Role:	Name:
Presenters	Tony Schiavone
Presenters	Eric Bischoff
Commentator	Jim Ross
Commentator	Jesse Ventura
Referee	Mike Atkins
Referee	Bill Alfonso
Referee	Randy Anderson
Referee	Ole Anderson; Senior referee
Ring announcer	Tony Gilliam

== Home Video and Streaming ==
Although not broadcast live in the UK, the event was released on home video in the spring of 1993 by Turner Home Entertainment. The event was edited down to two hours and the Ron Simmons versus Terry Taylor and Greg Valentine versus Marcus Bagwell matches were cut in their entirety.

The event was uploaded to the WWE Network. In 2025, the WWE subsequently uploaded the event to their WCW YouTube channel.

== Results ==
No.	Results	Stipulations	Times
1^{D}	Junkyard Dog, Tom Zenk and Big Josh defeated Tracy Smothers, Richard Morton and Diamond Dallas Page	Six-man tag team match	—
2	Scotty Flamingo defeated Brian Pillman (c)	Singles match for the WCW Light Heavyweight Championship	17:29
3	Ron Simmons defeated Terry Taylor	Singles match	07:10
4	Greg Valentine defeated Marcus Bagwell by submission	Singles match	07:17
5	Sting defeated Cactus Jack	Falls Count Anywhere match	11:24
6	Ricky Steamboat defeated Rick Rude 4–3	Iron Man Challenge; Paul E. Dangerously and Madusa were banned from ringside	30:00
7	Dustin Rhodes, Barry Windham and Nikita Koloff defeated The Dangerous Alliance (Arn Anderson, Steve Austin and Bobby Eaton) (with Paul E. Dangerously and Madusa) by disqualification	Six-man tag team match with Ole Anderson as Special Guest Referee	15:32
8	The Steiner Brothers (Rick Steiner and Scott Steiner) (c) vs. Terry Gordy and Steve Williams ended in a time limit draw	Tag team match for the WCW World Tag Team Championship	30:00
(c) / – the champion(s) heading into the match; D / – this was a dark match

=== Iron Man Challenge ===
Score		Point winner	Decision	Notes	Time
Rude	Steamboat	Point winner	Decision	Notes	Time
1	0	Rick Rude	Pinfall	Rude pinned Steamboat after a knee lift	7:32
2	0	Rick Rude	Pinfall	Rude pinned Steamboat after the Rude Awakening	8:50
2	1	Ricky Steamboat	Disqualification	Rude was disqualified after hitting Steamboat with a diving knee drop	9:45
3	1	Rick Rude	Pinfall	Rude pinned Steamboat with an inside cradle	10:15
3	2	Ricky Steamboat	Pinfall	Steamboat pinned Rude after a tombstone piledriver	17:41
3	3	Ricky Steamboat	Pinfall	Steamboat pinned Rude with a backslide	20:32
3	4	Ricky Steamboat	Pinfall	Steamboat pinned Rude after reversing a sleeper hold into a back press	29:30

== Aftermath ==
After Bill Watts took over WCW, several of his old-school Mid-South Wrestling rules were put into place, including removal of the mats around the ring, coming off the top rope became an automatic disqualification (in effect killing the budding light heavyweight division that had been established the previous year), and maintained the old NWA rule about throwing an opponent over the top rope was also an automatic disqualification. The "off the top rope" rule did not apply to NWA-sanctioned WCW matches (e.g. the NWA World Tag Team title tournament).

== Distribution ==
WCW closed in 2001 and all rights to their television and PPV shows was bought by WWE, including the Beach Blast shows. With the launch of the WWE Network in 2014 the 1992 Beach Blast show became available on demand for network subscribers. Due to copyright concerns some of the theme songs originally used were initially replaced with generic music, notably the entrance music for Sting and The Steiner Brothers composed by Jimmy Papa. In March 2014, WWE restored the original music after an unsuccessful lawsuit by the composer.
