= Brian Pillman =

American professional wrestler (1962–1997)

- Pillman, circa 1996
- Born: Brian William Pillman; May 22, 1962; Cincinnati, Ohio, U.S.
- Died: October 5, 1997 (aged 35); Bloomington, Minnesota, U.S.
- Spouse: Melanie Morgan (m. 1993)
- Children: 6, including Brian Pillman Jr.
- Professional wrestling career
- Ring names: Brian Pillman; Flyin' Brian; Yellow Dog; California Brian; Loose Cannon
- Billed height: 6 ft 0 in (183 cm)
- Billed weight: 227 lb (103 kg)
- Billed from: Cincinnati, Ohio "The kennel club" (as The Yellow Dog); Hollywood (as California Brian)
- Trained by: Stu Hart
- Debut: 1986
- Football career

No. 41, 58
- Position: Linebacker

Personal information
- Listed height: 5 ft 10 in (1.78 m)
- Listed weight: 228 lb (103 kg)

Career information
- High school: Norwood (Norwood, Ohio)
- College: Miami (OH)
- NFL draft: 1984: undrafted

Career history
- Cincinnati Bengals (1984); Buffalo Bills (1985)*; Calgary Stampeders (1986)
- * Offseason or practice squad member only

Awards and highlights
- First-team I-AA All-American (1982); Second-team All-American (1983); MAC Defensive Player of the Year (1983)
- Stats at Pro Football Reference

Brian William Pillman (May 22, 1962 – October 5, 1997) was an American professional wrestler and professional football player best known for his appearances in Stampede Wrestling in the 1980s and World Championship Wrestling (WCW), Extreme Championship Wrestling (ECW), and World Wrestling Federation (WWF) in the 1990s.

In WCW and ECW, Pillman created a legacy as "The Loose Cannon", a wrestling gimmick that would see him do a series of worked shoots that would gain him a degree of infamy for his unpredictable character. He was also known for being extremely agile in the ring, although a car accident on April 15, 1996, from which he received extensive ankle injuries, limited his in-ring ability. In the WWF's New Generation Era, he worked with his long-time friend and former tag-team partner Stone Cold Steve Austin in a storyline involving a firearm and with The Hart Foundation, both precursors to the developing Attitude Era. In October 1997, he died unexpectedly due to an undetected heart disease.

== Early life ==
Brian William Pillman was born on May 22, 1962, at the Jewish Hospital in Cincinnati, Ohio, to a Welsh mother named Mary; he had three sisters named Angie, Linda, and Susan, as well as a brother Phil. His father died of a heart attack when Pillman was three months old. Pillman developed multiple throat polyps as a child beginning at age two, undergoing between 31 and 40 operations to tend to them and receiving an electrolarynx. As a result, Pillman spent a large part of his early childhood in a hospital, only going home for Christmas. His mother chose to send him to a public school so that he could spend more time with his friends, leaving him as the only Presbyterian in his Catholic family. As a child Pillman played many sports, including basketball and hockey, but was rather fragile and often made fun of by other children due to his raspy voice, which had been damaged by the operations, prompting him to learn how to box.

== Football career ==
Pillman playing for the Miami Redskins

Pillman graduated from Norwood High School in Norwood, Ohio, a suburb of Cincinnati. While attending Miami University in Oxford, Ohio, Pillman played football for the Redskins (now Miami RedHawks) as a linebacker. A Division I-AA First-Team All-American in his junior year and a Second-Team Division I-A All-American in his senior year, he went undrafted in the 1984 NFL draft. He joined his hometown Cincinnati Bengals as a free agent and later the Canadian Football League for the Calgary Stampeders in 1986. Pillman also played for the Buffalo Bills in preseason action in 1985, but he was the last player cut before the start of that season due to an assistant coach finding steroids in his room. His attempts to make the roster of the Bengals were covered in a series of articles in The Cincinnati Enquirer written by Peter King. Pillman and New York Giants head coach John Harbaugh were roommates and defensive teammates while at Miami.

== Professional wrestling career ==
=== Stampede Wrestling (1986–1989) ===
Following the end of his football career, Pillman remained in Canada and began training as a wrestler under Stu Hart and his sons. He made his in-ring debut in November 1986 for Hart's Calgary, Alberta-based Stampede Wrestling promotion.

Pillman formed a tag team with Hart's son Bruce known as Bad Company, winning the Stampede Wrestling International Tag Team Championship by defeating Ron Starr and the Cuban Assassin in the finals of a tournament on April 5, 1987. Their reign lasted until October, when the titles were held up following a controversial ending to a match between Bad Company and their opponents, Jerry Morrow and Makhan Singh. Bad Company defeated Morrow and Singh in a rematch in November to regain the titles, eventually losing them to Morrow and the Cuban Assassin in July 1988. In 1988, Pillman had his girlfriend at the time, Trisa Hayes, portray his sister in order to get him over as a face by seating her at ringside and having heel wrestlers taunt her so that he could rescue her.

Pillman left Stampede Wrestling in March 1989.

=== New Japan Pro-Wrestling (1989) ===
After finishing with Stampede Wrestling, in April 1989, Pillman worked briefly for New Japan Pro-Wrestling (NJPW) as part of its "Battle Line Tokyo Dome" tour, where he wrestled in singles matches against Masa Saito, Tatsumi Fujinami, Black Cat and Naoki Sano and in tag team matches with Big Van Vader against Riki Choshu and Fujinami.

=== World Championship Wrestling (1989–1996) ===
==== Flyin' Brian (1989–1993) ====
Pillman returned to the United States in May 1989 and began appearing in vignettes hyping his in-ring debut for World Championship Wrestling (WCW) the following month, where he became known as Flyin' Brian due to his athletic ability and variety of aerial maneuvers. He unsuccessfully challenged Lex Luger for the NWA United States Heavyweight Championship at the Halloween Havoc pay-per-view on October 28 and at Clash of the Champions IX on November 15.

During this time, Pillman began teaming with "Z-Man" Tom Zenk and feuded with the Fabulous Freebirds (Jimmy Garvin and Michael Hayes), who they defeated on February 12, 1990, to capture the NWA United States Tag Team Championship. They successfully defended the titles against the Freebirds on February 25 at WrestleWar, but lost them at Capital Combat on May 19 to The Midnight Express (Bobby Eaton and Stan Lane). He defeated Buddy Landel on July 7 at The Great American Bash and at Clash of the Champions XIII on November 20. At WrestleWar on February 24, 1991, Pillman participated in a WarGames match, teaming with Sting and The Steiner Brothers (Rick and Scott) in a loss to The Four Horsemen (Ric Flair, Barry Windham and Sid Vicious) and Larry Zbyszko. On March 21, Pillman wrestled at the WCW/New Japan Supershow I in the Tokyo Dome, where he, Zenk and Tim Horner lost to Kuniaki Kobayashi, Shiro Koshinaka and Takayuki Iizuka.

On June 12, at Clash of the Champions XV, Pillman teamed with El Gigante against Windham and Arn Anderson in a Loser Leaves WCW match, which they lost. Per the stipulation, he was forced to leave WCW. However, Pillman instead re-emerged as the masked Yellow Dog (one of Windham's past gimmicks), competing in a series of bounty matches with his mask on the line. At The Great American Bash on July 14, he defeated Johnny B. Badd by disqualification after Badd's manager Teddy Long tried to remove his mask. The Yellow Dog gimmick was short lived as Pillman was reinstated in August. Also that month, Pillman wrestled for New Japan Pro-Wrestling as part of its "Summer Night Fever in Nagoya" and "Violent Storm in Kokugikan" tours, facing opponents including Jushin Thunder Liger and Kensuke Sasaki.

At Halloween Havoc on October 27, Pillman defeated Richard Morton in a tournament final to win the inaugural WCW Light Heavyweight Championship. He successfully defended the title against Badd on November 19 at Clash of the Champions XVII before losing it to Liger at a house show on December 25. Pillman regained the championship from Liger on February 29, 1992, at SuperBrawl II. At WrestleWar on May 17, he defeated his partner Tom Zenk to retain the title. He and Liger participated in a tournament for the NWA World Tag Team Championship, defeating Biff Wellington and Chris Benoit in the first round on June 16 at Clash of the Champions XIX. At Beach Blast on June 20, Pillman lost the Light Heavyweight Championship to Scotty Flamingo. Pillman and Liger then lost in the quarter-final of the tournament to Nikita Koloff and Ricky Steamboat at The Great American Bash on July 12.

In September, Pillman turned heel by slapping Brad Armstrong out of frustration for his knee injury and vacating the title when he was scheduled to defend it against Pillman at Clash of the Champions XX. He lost to Steamboat at Halloween Havoc on October 25 and defeated Armstrong at Clash of the Champions XXI on November 18. Pillman also started teaming with his former rival Windham, challenging for the NWA and WCW World Tag Team Championships against Steamboat and Shane Douglas at Starrcade on December 28 in a losing effort. Their team lasted until January 1993, as Windham had his sights on the NWA World Heavyweight Championship.

==== Hollywood Blonds (1993–1994) ====
Pillman subsequently began teaming with "Stunning" Steve Austin as the Hollywood Blonds, defeating Erik Watts and Marcus Alexander Bagwell on February 21 at SuperBrawl III. On the March 27 episode of Power Hour, they won the NWA and WCW World Tag Team Championships from Steamboat and Douglas. At Slamboree '93: A Legends' Reunion on May 23, they successfully defended the titles against Dos Hombres (Steamboat and Zenk) in a steel cage match. Pillman and Austin then feuded with Ric Flair and Arn Anderson of The Four Horsemen, mocking their ages and parodying Flair's interview show, "A Flair for the Gold", with their own called "A Flair for the Old". They successfully defended the titles against Anderson and Paul Roma at Beach Blast on July 18 before losing them in a rematch at Clash of the Champions XXIV on August 18. Prior to the event, Pillman suffered a leg injury during a tag team match on an episode of Main Event, so he was replaced in the match by Lord Steven Regal.

The Hollywood Blonds separated in October after Austin turned on Pillman to join Col. Robert Parker's Stud Stable, turning Pillman face and starting a feud between the two. At Clash of the Champions XXV on November 10, he lost to Austin after interference from Parker. On January 27, 1994, at Clash of the Champions XXVI, he defeated Parker in a match where the loser had to wear a chicken suit. At SuperBrawl IV on February 20, Pillman, Dustin Rhodes and Sting defeated Austin, Paul Orndorff and Rick Rude in a Thundercage match. He challenged Regal for the WCW World Television Championship on April 17 at Spring Stampede, but the match ended in a 15-minute time limit draw.

==== Four Horsemen and "Loose Cannon" (1995–1996) ====
After several months of inactivity, Pillman made his return to WCW programming in January 1995, originally to be renamed California Brian (which was quickly scrapped) as a face who had moved to California to pursue acting work on Baywatch, with Pillman slowly progressing into a tweener. He lost to Alex Wright at The Great American Bash on June 18. On September 4, Pillman wrestled the first match on the inaugural episode of Monday Nitro, defeating Jushin Thunder Liger. After costing Flair a match to Arn Anderson at Fall Brawl on September 17, Flair recruited the help of Sting to team up against Pillman and Anderson at Halloween Havoc on October 29. Pillman and Anderson attacked Flair before the match, forcing Sting to come out alone. When Sting needed a tag the most, Flair came out at the last minute with a bandage on his head, tagged Sting and immediately turned and attacked him, removing the fake bandage from his head to show it was all a plan between Pillman, Anderson and Flair. These actions signaled the reunion of The Four Horsemen; this incarnation consisted of Flair, Anderson, Pillman and Chris Benoit.

In the middle of 1995, Pillman again returned to New Japan Pro-Wrestling to compete in the Best of the Super Juniors. He wrestled against the likes of Dean Malenko, Tatsuhito Takaiwa, Black Cat, Koji Kanemoto, Shinjiro Otani, Gran Hamada, Black Tiger, Wild Pegasus, Wright and El Samurai in singles matches and in tag team matches together with Wright, Norio Honaga, Hamada or Malenko against Akira Nogami, Koji Kanemoto, Takayuki Iizuka, El Samurai, Malenko and Honaga.

At the end of 1995, Pillman developed his "Loose Cannon" gimmick, cultivating a reputation for unpredictable behavior and blurring fact and fiction with his worked shoots. He changed his once Hollywood Blond and Flyin' Brian clean athletic look for an edgy, out of control image. Even his allies in the Horsemen, especially Anderson, were wary of his behavior and tried in vain to keep him in check. In a match with Eddie Guerrero on January 23, 1996, at Clash of the Champions XXXII, which Pillman won, he grabbed commentator Bobby Heenan by the collar, causing Heenan, who had a history of neck problems, to blurt out "What the fuck are you doing?" live on the air. On February 11, Pillman outed Kevin Sullivan as booker at SuperBrawl VI in an I Respect You Strap match, where the loser announces that they respect the other wrestler, much like an "I Quit" match. Pillman lost to Sullivan in under a minute after grabbing the microphone and telling Sullivan "I respect you, booker man." The words "booker man" were cut from the commercial tape.

The day after SuperBrawl VI, Pillman was fired by WCW President Eric Bischoff. In Bischoff's autobiography, he said that Pillman was fired so that he could go and develop the "loose cannon" gimmick in ECW then return to WCW with more legitimate heat. Bischoff claims it was a plan he and Pillman came up with together, but Pillman wound up not returning. Pillman's final televised WCW match was actually on the February 19 episode of WCW Prime, taped long before SuperBrawl VI, where he teamed with fellow Four Horsemen member Chris Benoit to defeat The Barrio Brothers (Fidel Sierra and Ricky Santana).

=== Extreme Championship Wrestling (1994, 1996) ===
In late 1994, Pillman appeared with Extreme Championship Wrestling (ECW) as part of a talent exchange between ECW and WCW. His only match there was teaming with Shane Douglas to replace an injured Steve Austin, with Sherri Martel as their manager, in a losing effort to Ron Simmons and 2 Cold Scorpio.

Immediately following his departure from WCW, Pillman returned to ECW and appeared at the promotion's annual Internet convention, ECW CyberSlam, on February 17, 1996. During an interview conducted in the ring by Joey Styles, Pillman insulted Bischoff, calling him a commentator, a "gofer", and a "piece of fucking shit". After Styles attempted to end the interview, Pillman prevented him from doing so and turned his attention to the ECW audience, derisively calling them "smart marks". He then proceeded further by threatening to "yank out (his) Johnson" and urinate in the ring, before being confronted by ECW owner Tod Gordon, booker Paul Heyman and wrestler Shane Douglas, who had him removed from the ring by security guards. While being dragged from the arena, Pillman attacked a plant sitting in the audience with a fork he produced from his boot. Although he did not wrestle for ECW, Pillman made several further appearances with the promotion, engaging in a war of words with Douglas, setting up a proposed feud. He gained the backstage ire of New Jack when he referred to Jack's tag team with Mustafa Saed as "Niggas with Attitudes" at Fight the Power in June, a reference to the rap group N.W.A.

On April 15, 1996, Pillman was badly injured in Kentucky when his Hummer H1 flipped after he fell asleep while driving and hit a tree trunk. He was thrown 40 feet into a field and found in a pool of his own blood. Pillman was in a coma for a week and suffered numerous facial fractures and a shattered ankle, forcing doctors to fuse it together in a fixed walking position. He was forced to abandon his previous high-flying wrestling style for a more grounded style.

=== World Wrestling Federation (1996–1997) ===
==== Feud with Stone Cold Steve Austin (1996–1997) ====
Pillman signed a contract with the World Wrestling Federation (WWF) on June 10, 1996, which was announced in a press conference. He was the second wrestler to sign a guaranteed contract with the WWF after Marc Mero (indicative of the period in which Vince McMahon began to protect the company from abruptly losing talent to WCW) which was worth $200,000. Pillman acted as a commentator alongside Jim Ross while recovering from his broken ankle.

On November 4, 1996, Pillman took part in the infamous "Pillman's got a gun" angle on Raw with his former teammate Stone Cold Steve Austin. When Pillman initially arrived to the WWF, he aligned himself immediately with his long-time friend and former teammate Austin, serving as his lackey while he recovered. However, Pillman began noticeably favoring Austin's nemesis, Bret Hart, before Austin had enough and brutally attacked him in the ring during an interview on an episode of Superstars on October 27, 1996. Austin and Pillman had been feuding for several weeks, and Austin finally decided to take matters into his own hands and visit Pillman, whom he had already injured, at his home in Walton, Kentucky. WWF interviewer Kevin Kelly sat in Pillman's house with a camera crew and the Pillman family, while Pillman's friends surrounded the house to protect him. As the interview progressed, Pillman got infuriated and produced a handgun, angrily exclaiming, "when Austin 3:16 meets Pillman 9-millimeter Glock, I'm gonna blast his sorry ass straight to hell." Austin was attacked by Pillman's friends as soon as he arrived, but he quickly subdued them. He then proceeded to break into Pillman's home and advance on his nemesis. However, Pillman responded by pulling out the pistol and pointing it at a hesitant Austin, while Kelly and Pillman's wife Melanie screamed for help. The camera feed was then disrupted, with the scene fading to black. The on-scene director contacted commentator Vince McMahon and reported that he had heard "a couple explosions". The transmission was restored shortly before the end of Raw, and viewers witnessed Pillman's friends dragging Austin from the house while Pillman aimed the gun at Austin and announced his intention to "kill that son of a bitch!" Pillman also slipped up by saying "get out of the fucking way!" on live television, which prevented it from being edited out. The WWF and Pillman eventually apologized for the entire angle.

==== Hart Foundation (1997) ====
Pillman then aligned himself with his real life close friends Bret Hart, Owen Hart, The British Bulldog and Jim Neidhart, turning heel as part of the anti-American Hart Foundation and feuding with his former partner Austin. In the course of the feud, Austin was given on-screen credit for damaging Pillman's ankle in late October 1996 after placing it in between the seat and backrest of a folded chair and then jumping on the chair, a move which has subsequently been dubbed "Pillmanizing". Pillman began competing again full-time in May 1997, frequently teaming with Hart Foundation members in six-man tag team matches against Austin and the Legion of Doom (Hawk and Animal). On July 6, at In Your House 16: Canadian Stampede, Pillman and The Hart Foundation defeated the American team of Austin, Goldust, Ken Shamrock and the Legion of Doom in the main event.

Pillman engaged in his final feud with Goldust over Marlena. At SummerSlam on August 3, he lost to Goldust, forcing him to wear a dress during his matches for a month. Pillman then challenged Goldust again to a match with two stipulations; if Pillman won, he would take Marlena away from Goldust to be his personal assistant for 30 days, and if Goldust won, Pillman would leave the WWF for the rest of his life. In his final WWF pay-per-view appearance, Pillman defeated Goldust at In Your House 17: Ground Zero on September 7. During the feud they would for several weeks later appear in segments called "Brian Pillman's XXX-Files", in which Marlena was made to wear sexually provocative clothing. His final televised match came on the October 4 episode of Shotgun Saturday Night (taped on September 23), defeating The Patriot by disqualification due to interference from Goldust. After the match, Goldust chased him and Marlena out of the arena.

== Personal life ==
Pillman was a close friend to the Hart family. Both Pillman and the Harts have referred to themselves as being as close as siblings. He was the only member of the Hart Foundation to not be related to the family through either blood or marriage.

In 1993, Pillman was arrested for drunk driving and illegal possession of prescription drugs. As part of a plea agreement, the drug charges were eventually dropped.

In 1990, Pillman dated Terri Runnels while they were in WCW together. He later married Melanie Morgan (1965–2022), whom he first saw in a Penthouse magazine, on March 17, 1993. Melanie had two children at the time, Alexis Michelle Reed and Jesse Morgan (died 2025), from her previous relationships. At the time, he also had daughters, Danielle and Brittany, from two previous relationships. Brian and Melanie had two children together, Brian Zachary and Skylar King, the latter born after Pillman's death. Melanie also adopted one of Brian's daughters, Brittany. Despite not being their biological parent, Pillman is often referred to as the father of Melanie's children, Jesse Morgan and Alexis Michelle Reed, who he adopted before his death. At the time of his death, Brian and Melanie were involved in a heated divorce. She said that the divorce was meant to be a wake-up call for Brian, and they were still living together at the time of Brian's death, but he was banished to the basement.

In 2003, Melanie, who was remarried and now used the name "Melanie King," was working as a clerk for the trucking company owned by her father-in-law and received $10.50 per hour. At the time, Melanie stated in an interview with the Los Angeles Times that she regretted her decision not to file a wrongful death lawsuit against the WWE for Pillman's death, noting that Pillman would in fact inject HGH "under the skin once or twice a day from July 1996 to April 1997" while preparing for his comeback run in the WWF. Melanie stated that she decided not to file a wrongful death lawsuit after Vince McMahon gave her various compensation payments, included the $50,000 balance of Pillman's first-year contract, $65,000 for a memorial wrestling show which McMahon organized, and $12,000 in order to make a down payment on a home.

Melanie was acknowledged to be only two weeks pregnant with daughter Skylar at the time of Pillman's death. In 2017, Pillman's daughter Brittany claimed that her half-sister Skylar King is not Pillman's biological daughter, but the child of another man whom Melanie married shortly after Pillman's death, and that all the money given by WWF and wrestlers to support Pillman's family was used by Melanie for drugs. According to Brian Pillman Jr., Melanie, who died in June 2022 of an apparent drug overdose, had "lifestyle choices that dominated the better part of the last 25 years of her life" and which "had ultimately caught up with her.

== Death ==
On October 5, 1997, Pillman was scheduled to wrestle Dude Love at the WWF pay-per-view In Your House 18: Badd Blood. Steve Austin relayed that Jim Cornette was instructed to find the whereabouts of Pillman. Cornette contacted the Budgetel Motel in Bloomington, Minnesota, where Pillman had stayed the previous night, and was told by the receptionist that Pillman was found dead in his hotel room by the maids earlier that day at 1:09 p.m. Central Time. He was 35 years old. Bottles of painkillers and muscle relaxers were also found in his room. An autopsy attributed Pillman's death to a heart attack caused by previously undetected atherosclerotic heart disease, a condition which had also led to the death of his father. Nonlethal traces of cocaine were also found in his system.

The next night on Raw, the WWF paid tribute to Pillman, and later in the show, Vince McMahon interviewed Melanie Pillman. The interview was seen as being in poor taste and was awarded Wrestling Observer Newsletter's Most Disgusting Promotional Tactic award for that year.

== Legacy ==
In January 2008, Pillman's adopted daughter Alexis Michelle Reed entered professional wrestling as a valet and ring girl under the name "Sexy" Lexi Pillman. She died at the age of 26 on November 26, 2009, from injuries sustained in an automobile accident.

Like his father, Brian Zachary became a football player and played at the high-school level while attending Dixie Heights High School before graduating in 2011. In February 2017, he announced his decision to follow in his father's footsteps to become a professional wrestler. Trained by Lance Storm, he made his debut in December of that year. He wrestled for All Elite Wrestling (AEW) beginning in the summer of 2020, where he, Griff Garrison, and Julia Hart formed a stable, the Varsity Blondes, paying tribute to the 1980s era and his father's tag team with Steve Austin. He left AEW in 2023 and soon after debuted in WWE's developmental brand, NXT, under the ring name Lexis King.

Pillman was the subject of a 2021 episode of Viceland's Dark Side of the Ring. In 2024, Pillman's daughter Brittany Evans signed a Legends contract with WWE, allowing merchandise of the senior Pillman to be offered under her authority.

== Championships and accomplishments ==
=== Football ===
- Division I-AA All-American (1983)
- Division I-AA All-American Second-team (1982)
- MAC Defensive Player of the Year (1983)
- Ed Block Courage Award (1984)

=== Professional wrestling ===
- World Championship Wrestling
  - NWA United States Tag Team Championship (1 time) – with "Z-Man" Tom Zenk
  - NWA World Tag Team Championship (1 time) – with "Stunning" Steve Austin
  - WCW Light Heavyweight Championship (2 times)
  - WCW World Tag Team Championship (1 time) – with "Stunning" Steve Austin
- Stampede Wrestling
  - Stampede Wrestling International Tag Team Championship (2 times) – with Bruce Hart
  - Stampede Wrestling Hall of Fame (1995)
- Pro Wrestling Illustrated
  - PWI ranked him #84 of the top 500 singles wrestlers of the PWI Years in 2003
- Wrestling Observer Newsletter
  - 5 Star Match (1991) with Sting, Rick Steiner, and Scott Steiner vs. Ric Flair, Larry Zbyszko, Barry Windham, and Sid Vicious (February 24, WarGames match, WrestleWar)
  - Feud of the Year (1997) with Bret Hart, Owen Hart, Jim Neidhart, and Davey Boy Smith vs. Stone Cold Steve Austin
  - Most Underrated (1994)
  - Rookie of the Year (1987)
  - Tag Team of the Year (1993) with "Stunning" Steve Austin as The Hollywood Blonds

== Media ==
- WCW Superbrawl Wrestling (Video game − SNES, November 1994)
- Legends of Wrestling (Video game − December 3, 2001; May 27, 2002)
- Legends of Wrestling II (Video game − November 2002)
- Showdown: Legends of Wrestling (Video game − June 22, 2004)
- Brian Pillman: Loose Cannon (DVD − September 26, 2006)
- WWE '13 Downloadable Content (Video game − January 2013)
- WWE 2K16 (Video game − October 27, 2015)
- WWE 2K17 (Video game − October 11, 2016)
- Crazy Like a Fox: The Definitive Chronicle of Brian Pillman 20 Years Later (Book − November 5, 2017)
- WWE 2K26 Ringside Pass Season 3 (Video game − June 3, 2026)

== See also ==
- Brian Pillman Memorial Show
- List of premature professional wrestling deaths
- List of gridiron football players who became professional wrestlers
