= Tom Zenk =

American professional wrestler (1958-2017)

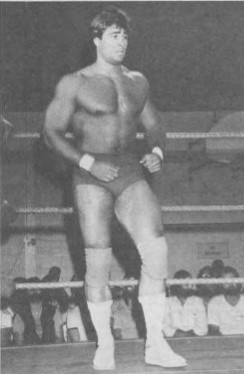
- Zenk in 1986

Personal information
- Born: Thomas Erwin Zenk; November 30, 1958 Golden Valley, Minnesota, U.S.
- Died: December 9, 2017 (aged 59) Robbinsdale, Minnesota, U.S.
- Cause of death: Atherosclerosis and cardiomegaly
- Education: University of Minnesota

Professional wrestling career
- Ring name(s): Tom Zenk; The Z-Man
- Billed height: 6 ft 2 in (1.88 m)
- Billed weight: 230 lb (100 kg; 16 st)
- Billed from: Minneapolis, Minnesota
- Trained by: Brad Rheingans; Eddie Sharkey
- Debut: February 1984
- Retired: October 1996

Thomas Erwin Zenk (November 30, 1958 – December 9, 2017) was an American professional wrestler and bodybuilder. He was a babyface for his entire career and was best known for his appearances with the World Wrestling Federation from 1986 to 1987, with the American Wrestling Association from 1988 to 1989, and with World Championship Wrestling from 1989 to 1994, as well for his tours of Japan with All Japan Pro Wrestling.

== Early life ==
Zenk was born in Golden Valley, Minnesota. He attended Robbinsdale High School in Robbinsdale, Minnesota. His 1976 graduating class included fellow future professional wrestlers Brady Boone, Barry Darsow, Curt Hennig, Nikita Koloff, and Rick Rude. He attended the University of Minnesota, where he majored in speech communications.

== Bodybuilding career ==
Zenk competed as a bodybuilder. In October 1980, he competed in the "Mr. North Country" competition, placing third. In July 1981, he participated in the "Mr. Minnesota" competition, winning championships in the overall, heavyweight, and "most muscular" divisions.

== Professional wrestling career ==
=== Early career (1984) ===
Zenk was introduced to professional wrestling by Road Warrior Animal, who he met at a bodybuilding contest. He was trained to wrestle by Brad Rheingans and Eddie Sharkey. He debuted in early 1984 with Mid-South Wrestling in Louisiana, with his debut taking place on April 2 at an event Baton Rouge, LA. In his debut, Zenk pinned Jerry Grey. The rookie then traveled to Houston Wrestling, where he pinned John King in his debut. On April 7, he defeated Grey once more at the MSW Superdome Extravaganza - The Last Stampede event.

=== American Wrestling Association (1984 - 1985) ===
In July 1984, Zenk joined the Minneapolis, Minnesota-based American Wrestling Association, making his debut on July 22, 1984. In a televised match, he teamed with Rick Gantner in a loss to Bobby Heenan & Mr. Saito. Zenk absorbed losses to "Mr. Electricity" Steve Regal and the Road Warriors before defeating Bruce Dean on August 18, 1984 at a house show. On September 22, 1984 he teamed with Curt Hennig to challenge AWA World Tag-Team Champions the Road Warriors, but were unsuccessful. As the fall began, the young Zenk continued to perform as an undercard talent and faced Jimmy Garvin in a series of house show encounters. Zenk was winless against the veteran, but did pick up wins over Rick Renslow. Zenk was named Rookie of the Year for 1984 by the Wrestling Observer Newsletter, tying with Jushin Liger.

The new year brought little change for Zenk's AWA's, as he absorbed losses to Regal, the Masked Superstar, Butch Reed, Billy Robinson, and King Tonga (Haku). Winless on television, Zenk competed at the AWA StarCage 1985 event on April 21, 1985 in Minneapolis. Teaming with Steve Olsonoski, the duo defeated The Alaskans (Dave Wagner & Rick Renslow). Zenk scored an unexpected draw against Nick Bockwinkle on a televised AWA show on August 21, 1985. The same night, he secured his first televised victory when he pinned the newly arrived Rob Rechsteiner (Rick Steiner), then defeated Brian Jewel and Steve Regal. His final match with the AWA came on September 22, 1985 when he teamed with Curt Hennig to defeat Drew Tossel & Jim Starr.

=== Pacific Northwest Wrestling, Lutte Internationale (1985 - 1986) ===
In October 1985, Zenk joined the Portland, Oregon-based Pacific Northwest Wrestling promotion, where he received a push. He made his debut on October 19, 1985 at an event in Portland, defeating Tim Flowers. That was start of a lengthy winning streak for Zenk, as he secured victories that fall against Chris Colt, Moondog Moretti, Mike Miller, Bobby Jaggers, and Mega Maharishi. On December 21, 1985, he and Scott Doring won the NWA Pacific Northwest Tag Team Championship by defeating Moretti & Miller. They lost the Championship to Bobby Jaggers and Rip Oliver the following month. In the same month, Zenk defeated Jaggers for the NWA Pacific Northwest Heavyweight Championship. He held the Championship until March 1986, when Jaggers regained it. Between May 1985 and October 1986, Zenk also wrestled intermittently with the Montreal-based Lutte Internationale promotion in Canada, where he won the Canadian International Tag Team Championship with Dan Kroffat.

=== World Wrestling Federation (1986–1987) ===
In October 1986, Zenk was signed by the World Wrestling Federation. He teamed with Rick Martel as The Can-Am Connection. The duo made their debut on the November 15, 1986 edition of WWF Superstars of Wrestling, where they defeated Steve Lombardi & Moondog Spot in a match pretaped on October 28.

On November 14, the new team received their first tag-team title opportunity when they faced The British Bulldogs in Montreal, Quebec. The WWF Tag-Team Champions lost via disqualification, working as heels for this one night. The team then travelled to All Japan Pro Wrestling for the AJPW Real World Tag League 1986 event, losing their opening match to The Funks (Dory Funk Jr. & Terry Funk on November 19, 1986 at Korakuen Hall. Following the loss the Can-Am Connection was dominant, defeating Kokusai Ketsumeigun (Goro Tsurumi & Rusher Kimura), Mighty Inoue & Tiger Mask, Haru Sonoda & Toshiaki Kawada, and others. Their final match of the tour came on December 12, 1986, where they were defeated by Giant Baba & Hiroshi Wajima in Mito, Ibaraki.

The Can-Am Connection opened 1987 with their first significant televised match, facing Don Muraco & Bob Orton on the January 24th episode of WWF Superstars of Wrestling. The match went to a double disqualification when all four wrestlers began fighting in the ring. They began a house show series with former WWF Tag-Team Champions the Dream team (Greg Valentine & Brutus Beefcake), dominating them in numerous matches. On February 8, 1987 on All American Wrestling, the Can-Ams defeated the Dream Team. On February 10 they faced another newly arrived tag-team in Demolition, battling the future Hall of Fame team to a draw. On February 28 on WWF Superstars, Zenk & Martell teamed with Lanny Poffo to upset the Dream Team & Adrian Adonis, with the climax of the match seeing Adonis accidentally cutting the hair of Brutus Beefcake in an angle that would lead to his eventual face turn and "Barber" gimmick.

On February 27, 1987, Tom Zenk entered singles competition for the first time in his WWF career, battling Canadian superstar Dino Bravo at a house show in Montreal, a match Bravo won. On March 8 in East Rutherford, NJ, the Can-Am Connection entered a tournament to earn a shot at the WWF Tag-Team Champions the Hart Foundation. Zenk & Martell advanced past the quarterfinals after defeating King Kong Bundy & Paul Orndorff via countout, then passed the semifinals after defeating the Killer Bees. The Hart Foundation then handed the Can-Ams their first WWF loss after former referee Danny Davis interfered. On March 15 they entered the Frank Tunney Sr. Memorial Tag-Team Tournament, defeating Jerry Allen & Dan Spivey in the quarterfinals before losing to Demolition in the semifinals by countout. In the opening bout of WrestleMania III on March 29, 1987, The Can-Am Connection defeated Don Muraco and Bob Orton, Jr.

Martell & Zenk continued their feud with Orton & Muraco on the house show circuit, dominating their opponents around the country. On May 3, on Wrestling Challenge, the Can-Ams defeated Kamala & Sika. Four days later on Prime Time Wrestling, Zenk entered singles competition defeated former Intercontinental Champion Greg Valentine after he was dropped crotch first onto the ring ropes. Two weeks later on Prime Time Wrestling, the Can-Ams defeated the Iron Sheik & Nikolai Volkoff. On May 30, 1987 on WWF Superstars, the Can-Ams were sloted to face the Islanders in a rare face vs face match. However, during the match Bobby Heenan arrived to stand in the corner of Haku & Tama. The Islanders turned heel and defeated the Can-Am Connection via countout, igniting a feud between the two teams.

The loss was a mere speedbump for the ascending Connection, who swept Kamala & Sika on the house show circuit. On June 29 on Prime Time, Zenk & Martell pinned Demolition. They then moved on to their house show feud with the Islanders, dominating Bobby Heenan's new charges. On July 9, 1987 in Hartford, CT, the Can-Am Connection defeated the Islanders once more; the team was planned to become the WWF's top face tag team and to win the WWF World Tag Team Championship, but Tom Zenk resigned from the WWF due to a pay dispute.

=== All Japan Pro Wrestling (1986–1989) ===
In November and December 1986, Zenk and Rick Martel toured Japan with All Japan Pro Wrestling, competing in the annual Real World Tag League. He and Martel received the World's Strongest Tag Determination League Fighting Spirit Award.

Between 1987 and 1989, Zenk made multiple tours of Japan with All Japan Pro Wrestling (AJPW).

=== American Wrestling Association (1988, 1989) ===
Zenk returned to the American Wrestling Association to wrestle a handful of matches in early 1988. He returned again one year later. On May 1, 1988, Zenk took part in the "Battle of Breakfast Cereal", a show recorded for the breakfast cereal manufacturer Kellogg's for a sales conference in which Kelloggs-themed characters faced characters themed after General Mills, Kellogg's' main competitor. In the main event, Zenk and Greg Gagne (wrestling as "The Sales And Marketing Team") defeated Pat Tanaka and Paul Diamond (wrestling as "The Mills Brothers"). Zenk left the AWA once more later that month. This era of The AWA (1985 to 1990) was seen for many years onward, appearing on The ESPN Network Television, as afternoon time-slot re-runs.

On February 7, 1989, Zenk competed in a 20-man battle royal for the vacant AWA World Heavyweight Championship in which he was the last man eliminated by the winner, Larry Zbyszko. He challenged Zbyszko in several return matches before moving to WCW.

=== World Championship Wrestling (1989–1994) ===
While touring with All Japan Pro Wrestling in 1989, Zenk was signed to a two-year contract with World Championship Wrestling by president Jim Herd. He debuted at Clash of the Champions VIII: Fall Brawl '89 in September 1989 under the ring name "The Z-Man", defeating The Cuban Assassin. His initial entrance music was the theme to the Tim Burton's 1989 Batman. On September 16, 1989, Zenk made his debut on World Championship Wrestling, where he defeated Mike Awesome. He immediately entered a house show series with Norman, where he was victorious throughout September. The following month he moved on to a new series, this time with Bill Irwin, where again he was victorious. Zenk made his WCW PPV debut on October 28 at Halloween Havoc '89, defeating Mike Rotundo in an event held in Philadelphia, PA.

In November 1989 he formed a tag-team with another new arrival to WCW, Brian Pillman. The duo challenged NWA Tag-Team Champions The Fabulous Freebirds, and on the November 18th episode of World Championship Wrestling they defeated the Freebirds via disqualification. On November 9, 1989, at a house show in Knoxville, TN, Zenk sustained his first pinfall loss when he was defeated by Mike Rotundo in a rematch from their recent Halloween Havoc encounter. He rebounded to defeat The Iron Sheik in multiple encounters, but then unsuccessfully challenged Lex Luger for the United States Championship in Pittsburgh, PA on November 19, 1989. In December, he pivoted from singles actions to teaming full-time with Pillman, and the duo defeated The Freebirds in Buffalo, NY om December 7.

Zenk and Pillman opened 1990 with a win over The State Patrol, defeating the tandem on the January 6th episode of World Championship Wrestling, then followed it up with a victory over The Galaxians. While teaming full-time, Zenk was awarded a match against NWA World Heavyweight Champion Ric Flair on The Power Hour on February 2, where he was defeated. The following day Zenk & Pillman entered a tournament to crown the vacant NWA United States Tag Team Championship, defeating The New Zealand Militia in the quarterfinals on NWA Worldwide. On February 6 in Corpus Christi, they defeated The MOD Squad on Clash of the Champions X “Texas Shootout”. On the February 17th episode of NWA Worldwide, Pillman & Zenk defeated The Midnight Express in the semifinals of the tournament, and a week later on the program they beat The Freebirds to win the United States tag-team championship.

The team had their first PPV match as a duo at Wrestle War 90: Wild Thing on February 25, 1990 in Greensboro, SC, where they defeated The Freebirds in a rematch. On March 10 on WCW Pro they defeated The Royal Family, and on the same day on World Championship Wrestling they beat The Midnight Express in a rematch. On March 31 on Worldwide, Pillman & Zenk defeated The New Samoans, and then successfully defended their championship in multiple house show rematches against the Midnight Express during April 1990. On the April 15th episode of The Main Event, the champions defeated The Minnesota Wrecking Crew II (the masked Destruction Crew). Five days later on the April 20th episode of The Power Hour, Zenk & Pillman sustained their first loss when they were defeated by The Midnight Express in a non-title match. On May 12, the champions successfully defended their titles against The Samoan Swat Team in Detroit, MI; however, during the match Zenk sustained an injury. A week later at the Capital Combat PPV, they were defeated by The Midnight Express, for the championship.

New WCW booker Ole Anderson decided to de-emphasize the team immediately afterwards, and Zenk was programmed into a house show series with Mean Mark Callous (the future Undertaker) where he was winless. When teaming with Pillman, the former champions were unsuccessful in their continued feud with the Midnight Express in numerous rematches. On June 13, he teamed with former opponent Mike Rotundo to face The New Samoans at Clash of the Champions XI “Coastal Crush”, where they were defeated. His losing streak continued on June 23 on Worldwide, Zenk faced NWA World Television Champion Arn Anderson and was defeated. He then faced the returning Buddy Landell in numerous house show matches, and was winless. He was also beaten by Sid Vicious in several house show matches. His descent reached its nadir on July 28, 1990 at the Great American Bash 90 PPV, where he was squashed by Big Van Vader in the latter's debut.

Zenk was finally able to halt the downward slide on the July 15 edition of The Main Event, defeating TV champion Arn Anderson via disqualification. Meanwhile, he kept his tandem with Pillman going, defeating preliminary opposition on WCW television as the summer progressed. On the August 18th episode of World Championship Wrestling, Zenk & Pillman earned another shot at the United States Tag-Team Championship and defeated The Midnight Express, albeit by disqualification when Sid Vicious interfered on behalf of Eaton & Lane. The two teams would continue to face each other on the house show circuit as the summer concluded and the fall began.

On September 5, 1990, Zenk was inserted in place of a departing Paul Orndorff to face the newly arrived Stan Hansen at the Clash of the Champions XII “Fall Brawl: Mountain Madness”, and was defeated. However, on September 22 on WCW Pro he and Pillman defeated Ric Flair & Arn Anderson via disqualification. On September 29 in Nassau, Bahamas, Zenk defeated Bobby Eaton in a stadium show. On October 13 on WCW Pro, he defeated the newly arrived JW Storm via disqualification. Zenk began to also team with Tim Horner, participating in a series of unsuccessful encounters with The Master Blasters.

However, Zenk's downward trajectory came to an abrupt halt at the end of October; he defeated JW Storm in multiple encounters and began to wrestle predominantly in singles competition for the first time in almost a year. On the November 17th episode of The Main Event he defeated Barry Horowitz, and then defeated Brian Lee on November 20 at Clash of the Champions XIII “Thanksgiving Thunder”. Four days later, Zenk pinned Rip Rogers a week later on Worldwide. The same day he pinned Bill Irwin on World Championship Wrestling. On December 2, he pinned The Motor City Madman on The Main Event, and a week later defeated him again in a rematch. By this point WCW announcers were making note of Zenk's burgeoning win streak, and on December 4, Zenk won his first singles titles when he defeated Arn Anderson to win the WCW Television title. He faced Bobby Eaton on December 16 at the Starrcade 90 PPV. When the promotion changed its name to World Championship Wrestling in 1991, Z-Man officially became the final NWA World Television Champion and the first WCW World Television Champion.

After defeating Bobby Eaton in several house show encounters, Zenk pinned Master Blaster Blade (Al Greene) on the January 20, 1991 edition of World Championship Wrestling but was then attacked by Eaton. The two faced off on the January 26th edition of WCW Pro, with Zenk successfully retaining his title. They would face off again at Clash of the Champions XIV “Dixie Dynamite” on January 30 in Gainesville, GA, with Zenk again pinning Eaton. During the event Missy Hyatt also announced that he had been awarded the title "WCW's Sexiest Wrestler" contest. Tom Zenk would then face Arn Anderson in a rematch on the February 2, 1991 edition of WCW Worldwide. Anderson pinned Zenk with his feet on the ropes, regaining the Television championship.

A day later, Zenk had the first match in what would turn into a lengthy feud with Terry Taylor. Facing off on WCW Main Event, the two went to a time limit draw. The stipulation was that the winner would get a shot at the WCW Television title; Zenk immediately asked for a rematch, and a week later defeated Taylor via disqualification after being thrown over the top rope. They faced off again, this time on the February 17th edition of Main Event, with Taylor winning via disqualification after Zenk pushed the referee out of the way. Six days later on WCW Worldwide, they faced off once more with Taylor - now a heel aligned with the York Foundation again winning via disqualification. Their feud carried over to the WrestleWar 91 PPV, where Taylor pinned Zenk in a no disqualification encounter.

On March 3, 1991 on WCW Pro, Zenk gained a measure of revenge by pinning Terrance Taylor in a rematch. On March 9 on Pro, former foe Bobby Eaton was in the midst of a face turn and faced York Foundation candidate Buddy Landell; after Taylor came out to attack Eaton, Zenk emerged to make the save. The same day on World Championship Wrestling it would be Zenk facing Landell with Taylor again attacking. This time, Eaton came out to make the save. On March 24, he teamed with Bobby Eaton to defeat Taylor and Landell on WCW Main Event. On March 30 on WCW Pro, Zenk again faced Taylor and was pinned after York Foundation bodyguard Mr. Hughes interfered. Zenk then interfered himself, during an April 13 match between Eaton and Taylor on Pro; during the match he temporarily stole the match-determining computer of Alexandra York.

Terrance Taylor and Tom Zenk continued their feud on the WCW house show circuit that spring, with many of their matches ending in draws. On March 21, 1991 he took a temporary break from his war with the York Foundation to compete at WCW / New Japan Starrcade 91, a supershow that featured the combined talents of WCW and New Japan Pro Wrestling. There he teamed with old partner Brian Pillman as well as Tim Horner in a losing effort against Shiro Koshinaka, Kuniaki Kobayashi, & Takayuki Iizuka. The feud continued on April 6 on World Championship Wrestling when Terrance Taylor teamed with another York Foundation candidate in Larry Zbyszko to defeat Zenk and Eaton via disqualification.

Shortly thereafter, Zenk tore a biceps while weightlifting and then injured it further during a house show match in Atlanta, GA at the Omni where he pinned Larry Zybysko. He took several months off to recover. When he returned in June 1991 he appeared more slender, and in his first match back was pinned by Oz (Kevin Nash) at a house show in Hammond, IN on June 5. Working himself back into ring shape, he defeated Mike Graham in numerous house show encounters, and then returned to television on June 12, 1991 at Clash of the Champions XV “Knoxville Knockout” where he teamed with The Young Pistols to defeat The Fabulous Freebirds & Badstreet (a masked Brad Armstrong). He then moved to a house show series with the Diamond Studd (Scott Hall), where he defeated the new arrival in several house show matches. However the Studd was able to pin Zenk on July 14 at the Great American Bash 91 PPV after manager Diamond Dallas Page interfered.

On the July 20, 1991 of WCW Pro, Zenk teamed with the mysterious masked Yellow Dog (former partner Brian Pillman) to defeat Steve Austin and the Diamond Studd via disqualification. On the August 3rd edition of WCW Pro, Zenk earned another shot at the WCW Television title but lost to champion Steve Austin via reversed decision after the referee determined that Zenk had used an international object. As the month progressed, Zenk began teaming with Robert Gibson, who had been abandoned by former Rock n Roll Express partner Ricky Morton when the latter joined the York Foundation. On the August 10th edition of WCW Worldwide the new team of The Enforcers defeated Gibson & Zenk. On the August 17th edition of WCW Pro, Zenk & Gibson joined forces with Dustin Rhodes to battle The York Foundation (Terrance Taylor, Richard Morton, and Thomas Rich) to a ten-minute, time limit draw. One week later on Worldwide, the Z-Man, Z-Man, Dustin Rhodes and Big Josh defeated The Fabulous Freebirds & Badstreet to capture the World Six-Man Tag Team Championship.

Around this time, Zenk signed a new contract with World Championship Wrestling. On August 25 at the Omni in Atlanta, Ga, on the final night of that year's Great American Bash house show tour, Zenk competed in a tournament to crown a new United States Heavyweight Champion after the title was vacated by Lex Luger following the latter's capture of the World Championship the previous month. The Z-Man was defeated by Steve Austin by disqualification in the quarterfinals. On August 31, 1991 he teamed with Big Josh to defeat Oz & Diamond Studd on WCW Main Event, and on the house show circuit he had a lengthy winning streak in matches against the Diamond Studd. Zenk competed in an opening card battle royal on Clash of the Champions XVI “Fall Brawl” on September 5. Later that night he challenged Steve Austin once more for the WCW Television championship, but this time was pinned. Two days later on World Championship Wrestling, the Z-Man was interviewed by Jim Ross and expressed his desire for a shot at the WCW World Heavyweight Championship, at that point being held by Lex Luger.

Meanwhile, his lengthy feud with the York Foundation continued; on September 14, 1991 on WCW Pro he faced Mr. Hughes in a match that never started after Lex Luger came out. The WCW World Champion offered Zenk the chance to recant his recent criticism, and when the Z-Man refused he attacked him. Two weeks later on WCW Worldwide, Zenk was attacked by Mr. Hughes and the newly returned Cactus Jack on orders from Luger. The Z-Man rebounded on the house show circuit, defeating Oz in numerous encounters. On October 14, 1991, Zenk faced Luger for the world title for the first time, at a house show in Birmingham, AL but was defeated. At Halloween Havoc 1991, Zenk lost to the debuting WCW Phantom (who was revealed after the match to be Rick Rude).

On September 21, 1991, Zenk, Rhodes, and Big Josh successfully defended the WCW Six Man Championship against The York Foundation. The champions were again victorious on the November 3rd edition of WCW Main Event against the York Foundation, but a week later Taylor, Morton, and Rich finally captured the titles. On the November 16th episode of WCW Pro, the trio received a rematch in a steel cage and were victorious, but did not capture the championship due to the match being a non-title bout. A week later on World Championship Wrestling the trio defeated the York Foundation in another non-title encounter, and did so again on November 28 at a house show at the Omni.

Zenk received numerous shots at Lex Luger's WCW World Championship in various November 1991 house shows but failed to capture the title. On the November 16th Clash of the Champions XVII, Zenk defeated the Diamond Studd to end their feud. On the November 30th edition of WCW Worldwide, Zenk teamed with WCW Light Heavyweight Champion Brian Pillman and Mike Graham in an unsuccessful effort against the Dangerous Alliance (The Enforcers and the newly turned heel Bobby Eaton). On the December 14th edition of The Power Hour, Pillman & Zenk challenged Steve Austin & Bobby Eaton but were again defeated. The same day on WCW Pro, the Z-Man defeated assailant Cactus Jack. On December 22, Zenk teamed with PN News for the first time to defeat Johnny B Badd & the Diamond Studd on WCW Main Event. After winning several singles matches against Larry Zybysko on the house show circuit in December, he closed out the year on December 29, 1991 at the Starrcade 91 PPV that saw him team with long-time rival Terrance Taylor in a randomize tag-team match in a defeat to Lex Luger & Arn Anderson.

He opened 1992 by resuming his partnership with Pillman. The long-time allies wrestled on the January 11, 1992 edition of World Championship Wrestling where they were defeated by Cactus Jack & Abdullah the Butcher. Two weeks later on World Wide, the team challenged The Young Pistols for a shot at the WCW United States Tag-Team Championship. A match took place later that night, with the Pistols victorious after they used one of their title belts to hit Zenk. On the February 1, 1992 episode of World Championship Wrestling, Zenk challenged Rick Rude for the United States title but was defeated. Later that month, Zenk began teaming with Marcus Alexander Bagwell. The duo challenged United States Tag-Team Champions Terrance Taylor & Greg Valentine on several occasions but were unsuccessful. On February 29, 1992, Zenk teamed with Van Hammer to defeat Vinnie Vegas (Kevin Nash) & Richard Morton at the SuperBrawl II PPV. On the March 7th episode of World Championship Wrestling, Zenk teamed with both Pillman & Bagwell in a loss to the Dangerous Alliance (Steve Austin, Bobby Eaton, and Arn Anderson).

On the March 4th episode of WCW Pro, Bagwell & Zenk defeated Taylor & Valentine in a non-title match. On March 22 on WCW Main Event, the Z-Man pinned Greg Valentine in single competition. On March 28 on World Championship Wrestling, he faced Terrance Taylor in another singles match and this time was defeated. That set up a rematch for the United States tag-team titles on the March 29th episode of Main Event; once more Taylor & Valentine were victorious.

On the April 4th episode of WCW Saturday Night, Zenk challenged Steve Austin once again for the WCW Television title and was defeated in a 2 out of 3 falls match. He rebounded on April 26 to defeat Johnny Flamingo via disqualification on WCW Main Event after J. T. Southern interfered. This in turn led to a May 3 match on Main Event that saw Bagwell & Zenk defeat Flamingo & Southern. On May 10 on the Main Event, Bagwell & Zenk teamed with Brad Armstrong in a losing effort to the Dangerous Alliance (Steve Austin, Arn Anderson, Rick Rude). One week later at the Wrestle War 92 PPV, Zenk challenged long-time partner Brian Pillman for the Light Heavyweight Championship but was pinned.

On June 16, 1992 at Clash of the Champions XIX, Bagwell & Zenk were defeated by Rick Rude & Steve Austin. On June 20, he teamed with The Junkyard Dog & Big Josh to defeat Tracy Smothers, Richard Morton, & Dallas Page in the dark match of the Beach Blast 92 PPV. On the June 28th episode of WCW Main Event, Bagwell & Zenk challenged new United States Tag-Team Champions The Fabulous Freebirds in a bout that went to a ten-minute draw. The Z-Man then began to team with Brian Pillman once more on a semi-regular basis, but began to slide down the card. On the July 4th episode of WCW Worldwide, Zenk was pinned by Dick Slater. Slater & Valentine then defeated Pillman & Zenk a week later on the program. On July 19 on WCW Main Event, the duo rebounded to beat Slater & Valentine by disqualification; on the August 1st episode of WCW Saturday Night, they defeated Slater & Valentine outright.

On the August 1, 1992 episode of WCW Worldwide, the Z-Man received yet another shot at Steve Austin's WCW Television title, but once more was defeated. He rebounded on the August 22nd episode of Worldwide to pin Tracy Smothers. The same day on WCW Pro, Zenk teamed with Bagwell once more to lose to Slater & Valentine. Later in the month he began a house show series with The Super Invader (a masked Hercules Hernandez) and dominated, winning most of their encounters. On August 29 on WCW Saturday Night, Zenk wrestled Ricky Steamboat in a comparatively rare face vs face match and was defeated. On September 12 on WCW Pro, the Z-Man faced former partner Bobby Eaton and was pinned. The same day on WCW Worldwide, Slater & Valentine defeated Tom Zenk & Jimmy Garvin in what would be the latter's final WCW match for over a year.

On the October 10th episode of WCW Saturday Night Zenk pinned Scotty Flamingo in a rematch. He then traveled to New Japan Pro-Wrestling while under contract with WCW, competing in the New Japan Super Grade Tag League II. He teamed with Jim Neidhart in a loss to Bam Bam Bigelow & Super Strong Machine on October 8, 1992 in Makuhari, Japan. Zenk would in eight matches on the tour and would face Manabu Nakanishi, Osamu Kido & Tatsumi Fujinami, amongst others. His final match of the tour came on October 21, 1992 in Shizouka, where he teamed with Neidhart & Pegasus Kid (Chris Benoit) in a loss to Raging Staff (Hiro Saito, Super Strong Machine & Tatsutoshi Goto).

When he returned to WCW, Executive Vice President Bill Watts had Zenk placed into a new tag-team with fresh arrival Johnny Gunn. The duo made their debut on October 25, 1992 at the Halloween Havoc 92 PPV. Teaming with a returning Shane Douglas, they defeated Arn Anderson, Bobby Eaton, and Michael Hayes. The duo next made an appearance on November 6 at a house show in Dalton, GA, defeating the Vegas Connection (Dallas Page & Vinnie Vegas). At the Clash of the Champions XXI special on November 18, a music vignette was shown with Zenk & Gunn buying clothes. On November 25 in Baltimore, Gunn & Zenk faced The Texicans (Tex Slazenger & Shanghi Pierce) and battled the new team to a draw. The presaged a feud between the two teams; on the December 5th episode of WCW Saturday Night the Texicans made derogatory remarks about Gunn & Zenk. A week later on the program, Zenk & Gunn defeated the Texicans via disqualification; after the match their opponents tried to put a dress on Zenk. The duo sustained their first loss on December 26, 1992 on WCW Saturday Night when they were defeated by Barry Windham & Brian Pillman.

Tom Zenk & Johnny Gunn began 1993 with another loss, this time falling to Cactus Jack & The Barbarian on the January 3rd episode of WCW Saturday Night. The televised losing streak continued, as Gunn & Zenk would fall to the newly arrived Wrecking Crew on the January 13th Clash of the Champions XXII. On the January 16th episode of WCW Worldwide, they were beaten by the Hollywood Blonds (Steve Austin & Brian Pillman). Then on January 23, Big Van Vader teamed with the newly returned Paul Orndorff to defeat Gunn & the Z-Man on WCW Saturday Night. The slide continued on January 30, 1993 when Zenk returned briefly to singles competition; he was defeated by Paul Orndorff on Worldwide and Chris Benoit on WCW Saturday Night. The losing streak finally ended on February 6 on Saturday Night when Gunn & Zenk defeated the Texicans, once more via disqualification. However the same day they would fall once more to the Hollywood Blonds, this time on WCW Pro.

Now having sunk to the bottom of WCW's tag-team division, their status was reinforced with yet another loss, this time once more to the Wrecking Crew on February 20 on WCW Saturday Night. A day later, Tom Zenk entered a tournament to crown a new WCW Television Champion but was defeated by Cactus Jack on WCW Main Event in the opening round. The Hollywood Blonds again defeated Zenk & Gunn on the February 27th edition of WCW Saturday Night. On March 13 on The Power Hour, the Texicans defeated Gunn & Zenk in a no disqualification match to end their feud. The same day the duo was beaten by Vinnie Vegas & Big Sky on WCW Worldwide. On April 10 on WCW Saturday Night they were beaten by yet another new team, this time by Bobby Eaton & Chris Benoit. The two teams would have a house show series that month, with Eaton & Benoit emerging victorious in each encounter.

On April 4, Tom Zenk faced NWA World Heavyweight Champion Barry Windham on the WCW Main Event in an unsuccessful challenge. He was again defeated in singles action, this time by the newly arrived Scott Norton on the May 1st WCW Saturday Night. On May 23, 1993, Zenk subbed for Shane Douglas in the team "Dos Hombres" with Ricky Steamboat at the Slamboree 93 PPV, but was not acknowledged by announcers. His next appearance would come at Clash of the Champions XXIII, where he intervened to help Johnny B. Badd after he was shot in the face with his own Bad Blaster by Maxx Payne. Zenk then Johnny B. Badd & 2 Cold Scorpio to defeat Maxx Payne, Big Sky, and Lord Steven Regal on WCW Saturday Night on July 24. A day later, Zenk and Gunn teamed again for the first time in months, only to be defeated by the Texicans once more. On July 31 on WCW Saturday Night they were beaten by the Collosal Kongs in what would be the final match for the tandem.

Zenk stayed off television for the remainder of the year, wrestling exclusively on house shows and occasionally appearing as a veteran hand in WCW's developmental shows at the Crystal Chandelier in Keneshaw, GA. He defeated old foe Terry Taylor on October 5, 1993, then lost to Michael Hayes on October 22 in Johnson City, TN. On December 7, 1993 he was beaten by Bryant Anderson at a Chandalier event, and lost to Tommy Rich a week later at the same location. Zenk finally returned to television after a five-month absence on the January 9, 1994 episode of WCW Main Event, defeating Bryant Anderson. Zenk was attacked by Dallas Page after the match, and following the conclusion of their brawl he was interviewed by Tony Schiavone and said he would face Page anywhere. The would face off on the January 23rd episode of the same program, where Page was victorious. The Z-Man wrestled Ron Simmons on the March 5, 1994 episode of WCW Saturday Night, losing to the former WCW World Champion. He rebounded to defeat Sgt. Buddy Lee Parker on the following week's episode. On March 26 on Saturday Night he was pinned by Bunkhouse Buck in what would be his final match with WCW.

=== All Japan Pro Wrestling (1994) ===
After Zenk's release from WCW in May 1994, he participated in All Japan Pro Wrestling's (AJPW) Summer Action tour that July, making his first appearance on June 30, 1994 in Korakuen Hall in Tokyo. Teaming with Johnny Ace, they were defeated by The Can-Am Express (Danny Kroffat & Doug Furnas). He gained his first victory on the AJPW Summer Action Series 1994 event on July 3, teaming with Stan Hansen to defeat the Can-Am Express. The tour concluded on July 28 in Tokyo, where he teamed with Johnny Smith & The Eagle (Jackie Fulton) in a loss to Kurt Beyer, Richard Slinger & Terry Gordy.

Two months later, Tom Zenk returned for All Japan's Giant Series tour. He teamed with Takao Omori in the opening night of the tour in a loss to the Can-Am Express. On October 1, he teamed with Danny Spivey to defeat The Eagle & The Falcon (Steve Armstrong). After wrestling numerous opponents that included Chris Candido and Masao Inoue, his final match of the tour came when the series concluded on October 22 when he teamed with The Eagle & Johnny Smith to face Dory Funk Jr., Giant Baba, and Jumbo Tsuruta. and their Giant Series tour in September.

=== Late career (1994–1996) ===
After WCW and All Japan, Zenk joined the American Wrestling Federation (AWF). He competed against The Bounty Hunter in season one of the AWF's Warriors of Wrestling show in the spring of 1995. In between seasons, he worked in his home state Minnesota where he competed on the independent circuit. On November 11, 1995 he teamed with Mike Enos on a PWA event in Rosemount, beating Blacktop Bully & Nailz. On December 4, 1995 he teamed with Charlie Norris to defeat JB Trask & Lenny Lane at an NPW event in Lindstrom.

In August 1996, the AWF's second season began to air Zenk joined the American Wrestling Federation (AWF), where he defeated The Terrorist on Warriors of Wrestling. After defeating The Blacktop Bully and Nailz in singles competition, his final match came on October 16, 1996 when he teamed with Billy Blaze to defeat Number 14 & The Hater.

== Death ==
Zenk died in Robbinsdale, Minnesota, on December 9, 2017, at the age of 59, from atherosclerosis and cardiomegaly. He was interred at St. Nicholas Cemetery in Carver, Minnesota.

== Championships and accomplishments ==
- All Japan Pro Wrestling
  - World's Strongest Tag Determination League Fighting Spirit Award (1986) – with Rick Martel
- World Championship Wrestling
  - NWA/WCW World Television Championship (1 time) (Note: The title's name was changed to the WCW World Television Championship due to WCW withdrawing from the NWA after Zenk won it, technically making him the last World Television Champion under the NWA banner and the first under the WCW banner.)
  - NWA United States Tag Team Championship (1 time) - with Brian Pillman
  - WCW World Six-Man Tag Team Championship (1 time) - with Dustin Rhodes and Big Josh
- Lutte Internationale
  - Canadian International Tag Team Championship (1 time) - with Dan Kroffat
- Pacific Northwest Wrestling
  - NWA Pacific Northwest Heavyweight Championship (1 time)
  - NWA Pacific Northwest Tag Team Championship (1 time) - with Scott Doring
- Pro Wrestling Illustrated
  - PWI ranked him #38 of the 500 best singles wrestlers of the year in the PWI 500 in 1992
  - PWI ranked him #343 of the top 500 singles wrestlers of the "PWI Years" in 2003
- Ultimate Championship Wrestling
  - UCW Championship (1 time)
- Wrestling Observer Newsletter
  - Rookie of the Year (1984) tied with Jushin Liger
- World Wrestling Federation
  - Tag Team Tournament (1987) - with Rick Martel
