= Crazy Like a Fox (book) =

2017 biography of Brian Pillman

Crazy Like a Fox: The Definitive Chronicle of Brian Pillman 20 Years Later
- Author: Liam O'Rourke
- Language: English
- Subject: Wrestling
- Genre: Sports biography
- Publisher: CreateSpace Independent Publishing Platform
- Publication date: November 5, 2017
- Publication place: United States
- Media type: Hardcover and paperback
- Pages: 318
- Awards: The Wrestling Observer Newsletter awards: Best Pro Wrestling Book, 2017
- ISBN: 978-1976541247

Crazy Like a Fox: The Definitive Chronicle of Brian Pillman 20 Years Later is a 2017 biography about American football player and professional wrestler Brian Pillman written by Liam O'Rourke and published by CreateSpace Independent Publishing Platform. It won the Wrestling Observer Newsletter award for Best Pro Wrestling Book.
