= Ricky Steamboat =

American professional wrestler (born 1953)

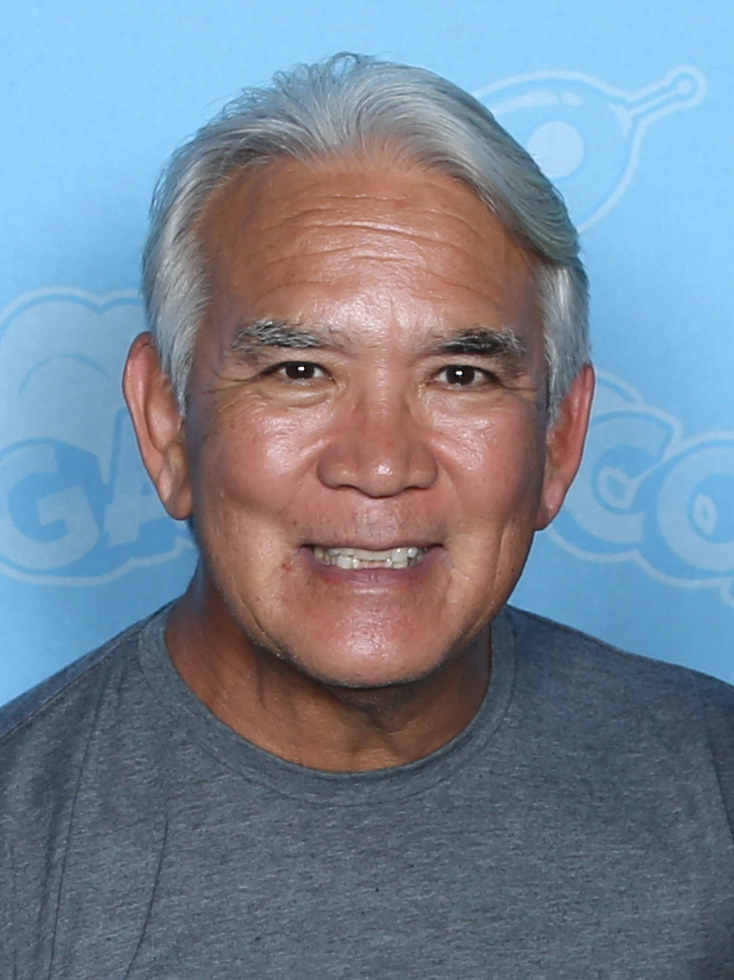
- Steamboat in 2022

Personal information
- Born: Richard Henry Blood; February 28, 1953 (age 73) West Point, New York, U.S.
- Spouses: Maureen Powers (m. 1977; div. 1980); Debra Blood (m. 1981; div. 1985); Bonny Hastings (m. 1985; div. 2003); Claudia Sobieski (m. 2004; div. 2012); Sandi McAlister (m. 2017)
- Children: Richie Steamboat
- Family: Vic Steamboat (brother)

Professional wrestling career
- Ring name(s): Rick Blood; The Dragon; Richard Blood; Ricky Steamboat; Sam Steamboat Jr.
- Billed height: 5 ft 10 in (178 cm)
- Billed weight: 235 lb (107 kg)
- Billed from: Honolulu, Hawaii; Charlotte, North Carolina
- Trained by: Verne Gagne; The Iron Sheik
- Debut: February 15, 1976
- Retired: November 27, 2022

Richard Henry Blood Sr. (born February 28, 1953), better known by his ring name Ricky "the Dragon" Steamboat, is an American retired professional wrestler currently signed to All Elite Wrestling (AEW). He is best known for his work with the American Wrestling Association (AWA), Jim Crockett Promotions (JCP), World Championship Wrestling (WCW), and the World Wrestling Federation (WWF, now WWE). Steamboat is regarded as one of the greatest and most influential professional wrestlers of all time.

In JCP and WCW, he was a one-time NWA World Heavyweight Champion, a four-time United States Heavyweight Champion, a four-time World Television Champion, a 12-time World Tag Team Champion (eight under the WCW banner, one (though unofficial) under the NWA banner, and three under the Mid-Atlantic banner), and a two-time Mid-Atlantic Heavyweight Champion. In the WWF/E, Steamboat was a one-time Intercontinental Heavyweight Champion and was inducted into the WWE Hall of Fame in 2009.

== Early life ==
Richard Henry Blood was born on February 28, 1953, in West Point, New York, to a Japanese American mother and a white father. He went to high school first in New York and later graduated in 1971 from Boca Ciega High School in Gulfport, Florida, where he was on the amateur wrestling team. He was a two-time New York state qualifier and a Florida state champion.

== Professional wrestling career ==
=== American Wrestling Association (1976) ===
Blood was trained to wrestle by Verne Gagne and The Iron Sheik. He debuted in March 1976 as a babyface in Gagne's Minneapolis, Minnesota–based American Wrestling Association (AWA), wrestling as "Rick Blood". His early opponents included Scott Irwin, Buck Zumhofe, Mad Dog Vachon, and Blackjack Lanza. In May 1976, he took part in a two ring, $50,000 battle royal that was won by Mad Dog Vachon and Larry Hennig. He left the AWA later that month to join Championship Wrestling from Florida.

=== Championship Wrestling from Florida (1976–1977) ===
Before Blood's debut in Championship Wrestling from Florida, Eddie Graham gave him the ring name "Ricky Steamboat" based on his resemblance to Hawaiian wrestler Sammy Steamboat. According to Steamboat, Graham thought "Rick Blood" was a good name for a heel, but not a face.

=== Jim Crockett Promotions (1977–1985) ===
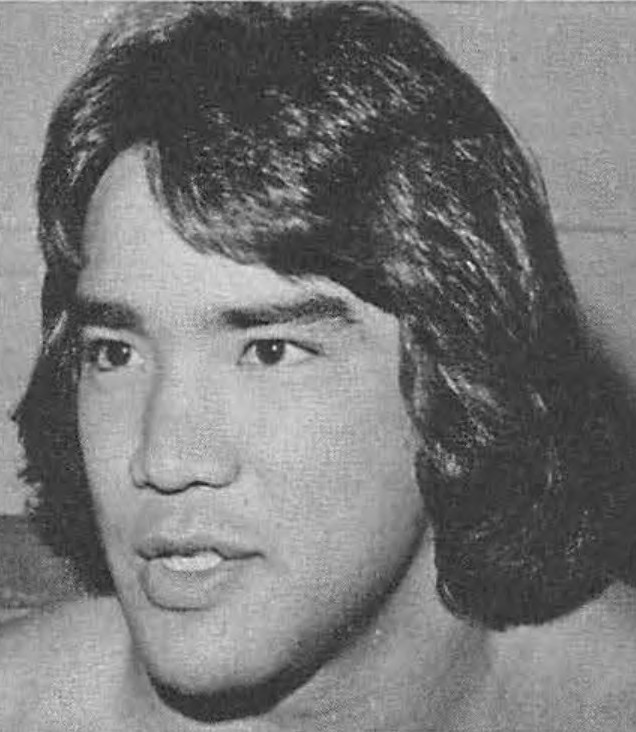
Steamboat in 1979

In 1977, Steamboat entered the National Wrestling Alliance-sanctioned Jim Crockett Promotions (JCP) (which ran under the concurrent brand names "Mid-Atlantic Championship Wrestling" and "Wide World Wrestling"—later "World Wide Wrestling"—as well as airing syndicated TV programs under those respective names), where he would remain for the next eight years of his career. Steamboat, who had been brought in by JCP booker George Scott on the recommendation of Wahoo McDaniel, was initially billed as a babyface protege of Wahoo and barely spoke above whispers in interviews. Matching him with his brash young counterpart, Ric Flair, was a natural fit. Steamboat was doing an interview on the syndicated Mid-Atlantic Championship Wrestling when Flair, then Mid-Atlantic television champion, began goading him. Steamboat knocked Flair out with a backhand chop to set up a match between the two. Steamboat's star-making performance came when he pinned Flair after a double thrust off the top rope to win the NWA Mid-Atlantic Television Championship at the WRAL-TV studios in Raleigh, North Carolina.

Over the next eight years in JCP, Steamboat captured the NWA United States Heavyweight Championship three times and the NWA World Tag Team Championship six times (once with Paul Jones and five times with Jay Youngblood). He also held the NWA Mid-Atlantic Heavyweight Championship singles crown twice and the NWA Mid-Atlantic Tag Team Championship four times (three times with Paul Jones, once with Jay Youngblood). He also won the Television title (which had been renamed NWA World Television Championship) a second time.

Notable moments involving Steamboat's time in the Mid-Atlantic territory include: the day Flair dragged his face around the television studio, causing facial scarring, and Steamboat retaliating the following week by ripping Flair's expensive suit to shreds (an angle that would be reworked several times involving other wrestlers in the years that followed); when longtime tag team partner Jones turned heel on Steamboat at the end of a two-ring battle royal; Steamboat and Youngblood painting yellow streaks down the backs of Paul Jones and Baron von Raschke to embarrass them into defending the World Tag Team titles against the two; Steamboat and Youngblood's top drawing feud with Sgt. Slaughter and Don Kernodle; Steamboat and Youngblood being turned on by their friends Jack and Jerry Brisco; Steamboat in a shocking (and emotional) feud against former mentor McDaniel; and his last great series in the territory, feuding with Tully Blanchard over the NWA TV title. After creative differences with JCP booker Dusty Rhodes, Steamboat left the NWA.

=== World Wrestling Federation (1985–1988) ===
==== Birth of "the Dragon" (1985–1986) ====
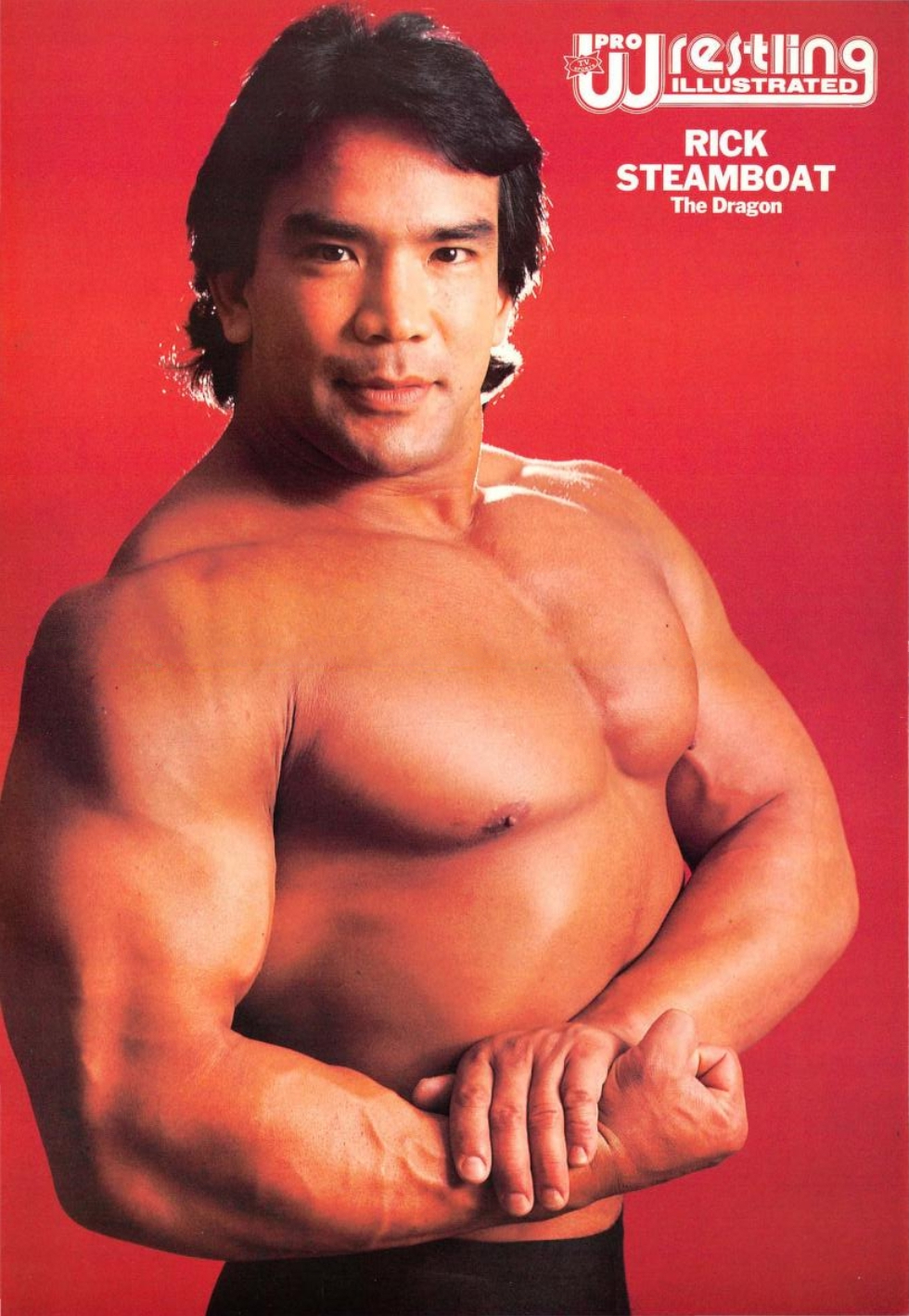
Steamboat in 1986

In 1985, Steamboat was offered a contract by Vince McMahon and joined the World Wrestling Federation (WWF). Shortly after his debut (where he defeated Steve Lombardi on Championship Wrestling), Steamboat was given the gimmick of a babyface nicknamed "the Dragon"; Steamboat's jacket-and-trunks attire was replaced by a keikogi and long tights. Steamboat's mother is Japanese American, hence his Asian features crucial for his "Dragon" gimmick. Steamboat kept the nickname and gimmick for the remainder of his career.

He appeared at the inaugural WrestleMania, where he defeated Matt Borne in the card's third match. On the September 14, 1985, edition of Championship Wrestling, Steamboat defeated Mr. Fuji, but after his victory was attacked by Fuji's protege Don Muraco, pitting Steamboat in a feud against Muraco and Fuji. During a televised episode of Championship Wrestling, Steamboat and Muraco were scheduled for a match that never officially started after Muraco jumped Steamboat before the bell. Following the beat down, Muraco and Fuji used Steamboat's karate black belt to hang him outside the ring from the top rope before Steamboat was finally saved by Tito Santana and the Junkyard Dog. On the November 2 Saturday Night's Main Event III, he defeated Fuji in a kung-fu challenge. On the January 4, 1986, Saturday Night's Main Event IV, his intense feud with Muraco ended after he and the JYD beat Muraco and Fuji in a tag team match.

In the opening round at WWF The Wrestling Classic, Steamboat faced Davey Boy Smith in a rare match pitting two fan favorites against each other. The match moved back and forth until Smith landed in the ropes trying to attack Steamboat, but Steamboat sidestepped and Smith injured his groin and was unable to continue, so Steamboat was awarded the match by forfeit. He then faced off against Randy Savage in the quarterfinals. The referee was distracted by Miss Elizabeth as Savage took advantage and pulled out brass knuckles from his tights and hit Steamboat before pinning him to win the match.

After a victory over Hercules Hernandez at the Los Angeles portion of WrestleMania 2, Steamboat began his next feud with Jake "The Snake" Roberts. Their feud began when Roberts attacked him before their match on the May 3 Saturday Night's Main Event VI, which did not occur due to Roberts assaulting Steamboat. Roberts was initially reluctant to deliver the DDT on the concrete floor due to his fear that Steamboat would not be able to stop his head from hitting the floor, which, on this particular occasion, was not covered with protective mats. Vince McMahon and booker George Scott were adamant that the spot take place outside the ring. Only after assurances by Steamboat that he would protect himself did Roberts agree to it. However, Roberts' fears came true and Steamboat was legitimately knocked out when his forehead hit the concrete. Roberts later described the sound as like a watermelon bursting. They later battled each other in a Snake Pit match (no DQ) in front of 74,000 fans at The Big Event in Toronto, Ontario, Canada, which Steamboat won with a small package despite Roberts dominating virtually the entire match to that point. Their feud finally ended on the October 4 Saturday Night's Main Event VII, when Steamboat defeated Roberts in their Snake Pit rematch. Following the match, Roberts continued to attack Steamboat and was about to place his snake Damien on him, but Steamboat took his Komodo Dragon out of his bag and scared Roberts from the ring.

==== Intercontinental Heavyweight Champion and departure (1986–1988) ====
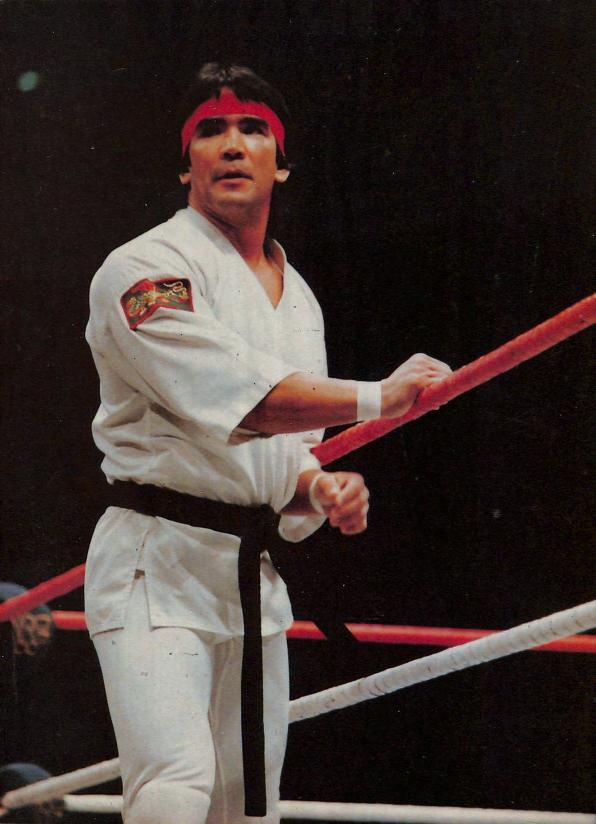
Steamboat, c. 1987

On the November 22, 1986 edition of Superstars, Steamboat got a shot at the WWF Intercontinental Heavyweight Championship against Macho Man Randy Savage. Steamboat lost the match by countout but after the match, Savage continued to assault him and injured Steamboat's larynx (kayfabe) with the ring bell, beginning an angle between the two. On the January 3, 1987 Saturday Night's Main Event IX, Steamboat returned from his injury and prevented Savage from attacking George Steele like he had done to Steamboat six weeks prior. At WrestleMania III, Steamboat defeated Savage for the Intercontinental Championship. The highly influential match was considered an instant classic by both fans and critics, was named 1987's Match of the Year by both Pro Wrestling Illustrated and the Wrestling Observer, and is still today considered one of the best matches ever in wrestling.

Several weeks after winning the Intercontinental Heavyweight Championship, Steamboat asked WWF owner Vince McMahon for some time off to be with his wife Bonnie, who was expecting the birth of their first son, Richard, Jr. This did not sit well with WWF management as he had been groomed to become a long-term champion. The decision was made by WWF management to punish Steamboat by having him initially drop the title to Butch Reed, but Reed did not show up that night, so he dropped to The Honky Tonk Man on the June 15 edition of Superstars; his son was born a month later. Steamboat came back in time for the Survivor Series in November 1987. WWF management was still bitter over his impromptu sabbatical from his first WWF run, however, and while he wasn't jobbing in his matches, he was not pushed or given any meaningful feuds. Steamboat himself has implied in interviews that he was being punished for one-upping the Hogan-Andre main event at WrestleMania III. After defeating Rick Rude by disqualification at 1988 Royal Rumble, Steamboat was entered into the tournament for the vacant WWF World Heavyweight Championship at WrestleMania IV in March 1988. On WWF television prior to the match, Steamboat appeared in a vignette where he stated that he hoped Randy Savage would win his first round match, thus setting up a rematch of last year's WrestleMania match and "one more classic confrontation". However, Steamboat would lose to his first round opponent Greg Valentine. Although television segments were shot immediately after WrestleMania IV that made it appear that Steamboat would be facing Valentine in a series of matches, Steamboat left the WWF shortly thereafter.

=== World Championship Wrestling (1989) ===
Steamboat made his comeback to wrestling in January 1989 and returned to the NWA affiliate World Championship Wrestling on the January 21, 1989 edition of World Championship Wrestling (it would later become the name of the promotion) as a surprise tag team partner of "Hot Stuff" Eddie Gilbert against NWA World Champion, Ric Flair and Barry Windham in a tag team match that saw Steamboat pin Flair. This earned him a shot at the title at Chi-Town Rumble where Steamboat defeated Flair in the main event for the NWA World Heavyweight Championship. He was also the last NWA World Champion to defend the belt in All Japan Pro Wrestling (AJPW) in a match against Tiger Mask II. After Steamboat retained the NWA title against Flair in a controversial ending on the April 2 Clash of the Champions VI: Ragin' Cajun, Flair and Steamboat would then face each other in their final rematch at WrestleWar in May, where Steamboat dropped the title to Flair.

After losing the title, Steamboat remained the number one contender to the NWA World Heavyweight Championship, a fact that irked fellow babyface U.S. Champion Lex Luger. This dispute culminated in Luger attacking Steamboat on the June 14 Clash of the Champions VII: Guts and Glory, thus turning heel. Luger stood over the fallen Steamboat and arrogantly said, "There lays your number one contender!" Steamboat then demanded a no disqualification match against Luger at The Great American Bash for the title, but just before the bell Luger demanded the clause be dropped or there would not be a match. Steamboat lost the match by disqualification after hitting Luger with a chair. Due to a contract dispute this would be Steamboat's last match of note in WCW in 1989.

=== North American Wrestling Association / South Atlantic Pro Wrestling (1990) ===
After leaving the NWA, Steamboat underwent surgery on his injured foot. Fully recovered, he returned to the ring in February 1990 for the North Carolina–based North American Wrestling Association (later renamed South Atlantic Pro Wrestling in July 1990), where he feuded with Robert Fuller over the NAWA/SAPW Heavyweight Championship, until leaving the promotion in October 1990.

=== New Japan Pro-Wrestling (1990) ===
In September and October 1990, he toured with New Japan Pro-Wrestling (NJPW), where he faced high-profile stars like Hiroshi Hase and The Great Muta and teamed up with the likes of Owen Hart, Pegasus Kid, Riki Choshu, Shinya Hashimoto, and Miguel Perez, Jr., and also having matches with aspiring stars Hiro Saito and Takayuki Iizuka.

=== World Wrestling Federation (1991) ===
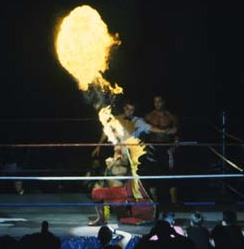
Steamboat as "The Dragon"

In 1991, Steamboat returned to the World Wrestling Federation after signing a two-year contract. Billed simply as The Dragon, a series of vignettes began airing in February 1991 that featured him breathing fire. Despite his previous success in the WWF as a one-time Intercontinental Heavyweight Champion, Steamboat was mainly treated as a brand-new wrestler, save for the announcers occasionally making reference to his WrestleMania III match and former title reign. Steamboat's first match came on a Superstars taping on March 11 in Pensacola, FL when he defeated Jeff Sword. His first televised match was on the March 30 edition of Superstars when he defeated the Brooklyn Brawler with his signature diving crossbody. On subsequent episodes of Superstars and Wrestling Challenge, Steamboat would go on to win numerous squash matches. He would also be victorious on televised Madison Square Garden events, defeating the likes of Haku, Demolition Smash, Paul Roma, Col. Mustafa, Pat Tanaka, and The Warlord.

Steamboat's only pay per view appearance during his second WWF tenure was at SummerSlam. Teaming with Kerry Von Erich and Davey Boy Smith against the Warlord, Hercules, and Paul Roma, Steamboat got the victory for his team by pinning Roma.

The Dragon was undefeated on television during his 1991 run and lost only one match, a house show bout against Skinner. The day after his dark match loss, Steamboat gave his notice to WWF management and then quit the company shortly thereafter. He had been booked for the Survivor Series, teaming with Jim Neidhart (who would be replaced by Sgt. Slaughter due to injury), Jim Duggan, and Kerry Von Erich against Col. Mustafa, Skinner, The Berzerker, and Big Bully Busick (who would be replaced by Hercules after Busick left the WWF), but he left before the event and was replaced by Tito Santana. It is rumored that Steamboat was booked to be squashed by The Undertaker on Superstars to build Undertaker for his impending WWF Championship match against Hulk Hogan, and that Steamboat chose to quit the WWF rather than lose to Undertaker. Undertaker instead squashed Kerry Von Erich on Wrestling Challenge weeks prior to Survivor Series.

During his time in the WWF, Steamboat asked Pat Patterson to work as a heel. Steamboat proposed to fight as a masked heel until somebody would remove his mask, but Patterson said he was a consummate babyface.

=== Return to WCW (1991–1994) ===
==== World Tag Team Champion (1991–1992) ====
In November 1991 at Clash of the Champions XVII, Steamboat returned to World Championship Wrestling (WCW) as the surprise tag team partner of Dustin Rhodes, substituting for an injured Barry Windham. Steamboat and Rhodes defeated the Enforcers (Arn Anderson and Larry Zbyszko) to win the World Tag Team Championship, Steamboat's first World Tag Team Title under the WCW banner. They lost the titles to Arn Anderson and his new partner Bobby Eaton at a live event in January 1992. Steamboat began feuding with the Dangerous Alliance at this point, facing them in a critically acclaimed WarGames match at WrestleWar, which received a 5-star rating from Dave Meltzer. He unsuccessfully challenged Dangerous Alliance member and United States Heavyweight Champion Rick Rude for the title at SuperBrawl II. Their rivalry culminated in a non-title Iron Man Challenge at Beach Blast, which Steamboat won.

==== World Television Champion (1992–1993) ====
On the September 2, 1992 Clash of the Champions XX: 20th Anniversary, Steamboat defeated "Stunning" Steve Austin to win his first Television Championship under the WCW banner. He lost the title to Scott Steiner at a television taping on September 29. He however, won both his first NWA World Tag Team Championship (unrecognized by NWA) and his second WCW World Tag Team Title with Shane Douglas (NWA and WCW titles were unified) on the November 18 Clash of the Champions XXI by defeating Barry Windham and Dustin Rhodes. On the March 27, 1993 edition of Power Hour, they lost the NWA and WCW titles to The Hollywood Blonds (Brian Pillman and Steve Austin). On the August 18 Clash of the Champions XXIV, he defeated Paul Orndorff to win his second and final WCW World Television Championship. In September 1993, at Fall Brawl, Steamboat's TV title reign was ended when he lost to Lord Steven Regal. At Starrcade '93: 10th Anniversary, the two fought in a rematch for the title which resulted in a time-limit draw.

==== United States Heavyweight Champion and retirement (1994) ====
Heading into 1994, Steamboat engaged in one last feud over the WCW World Heavyweight Championship with longtime rival Ric Flair, which culminated in a match in the main event of Spring Stampede where the title was briefly held up due to both men's shoulders being pinned at the same time. On the May 14 edition of Saturday Night, Flair defeated Steamboat to reclaim possession of the title. Their final singles match was on Main Event in July which ended on a disqualification when Steve Austin interfered. Steamboat and Flair's last encounter was in a tag team match on the July 31 edition of Main Event where Steamboat teamed with Sting against Ric Flair and Steve Austin.

He then feuded with US Champion "Stunning" Steve Austin and earned a US title shot at Bash at the Beach, but lost. On the August 24 Clash of the Champions XXVIII, he got a rematch against Austin where Steamboat hurt his back, but managed to pin Austin for the United States Heavyweight Championship. However, he had to give up the belt due to the injury at Fall Brawl; he was replaced by "Hacksaw" Jim Duggan, who made his WCW debut after Duggan left the WWF. The match was started, Duggan defeated Austin to become new United States Heavyweight Champion. In September 1994, Steamboat was fired by WCW President Eric Bischoff via FedEx package (while injured), thus ending a nearly two decade relationship with the Crockett/Turner wrestling organization.

=== First retirement (1994–2005) ===
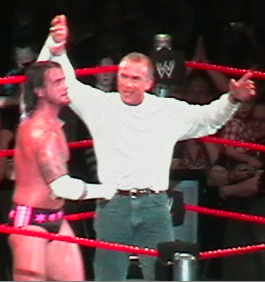
Steamboat mentored CM Punk

After an eight-year retirement, Steamboat played an important role in the genesis of Total Nonstop Action Wrestling (TNA), where he was the referee of the first Gauntlet for the Gold for the NWA World Heavyweight Championship. He was also the referee for the four-way double-elimination match to crown the first holder of the TNA X Division Championship. He has also made appearances for Ring of Honor where he refereed the first defense of the ROH Pure Wrestling Championship. In 2004, he engaged in a series of confrontations with CM Punk over Punk's arrogance in matches Steamboat refereed and then became CM Punk's inspiration to become the better person Steamboat knew he could be. The latter part of 2004 saw Steamboat feud with Mick Foley over which style of wrestling was superior, pure wrestling or hardcore wrestling. The two of them had many confrontations and managed teams to face one another, but never had a match against each other. Steamboat's last ROH appearance was at Final Battle 2004 where he and Foley finally made peace.

=== Second return to WWE (2005–2014) ===
==== Agent and feud with Chris Jericho (2005–2009) ====
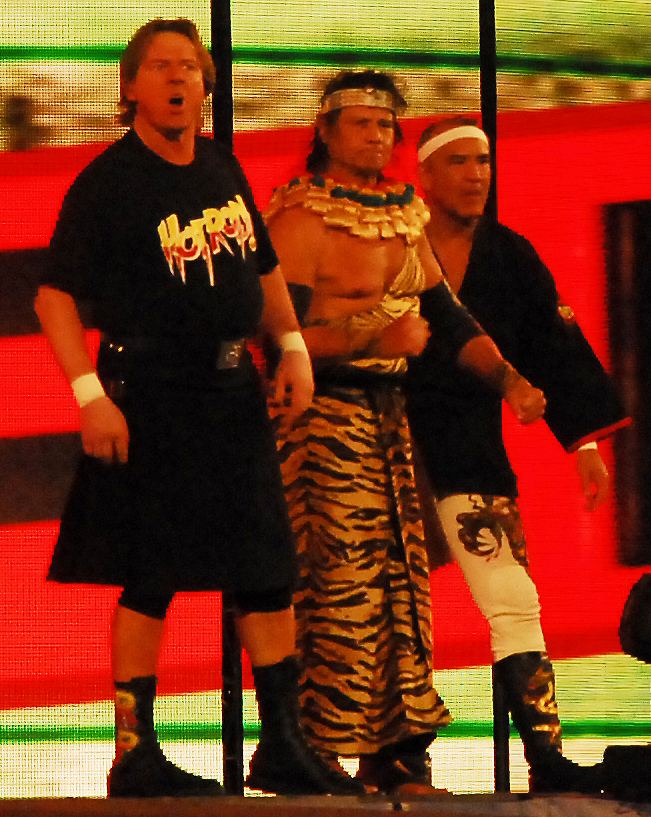
Steamboat with fellow WWE Hall of Famers Roddy Piper and Jimmy Snuka before their match against Chris Jericho at WrestleMania 25

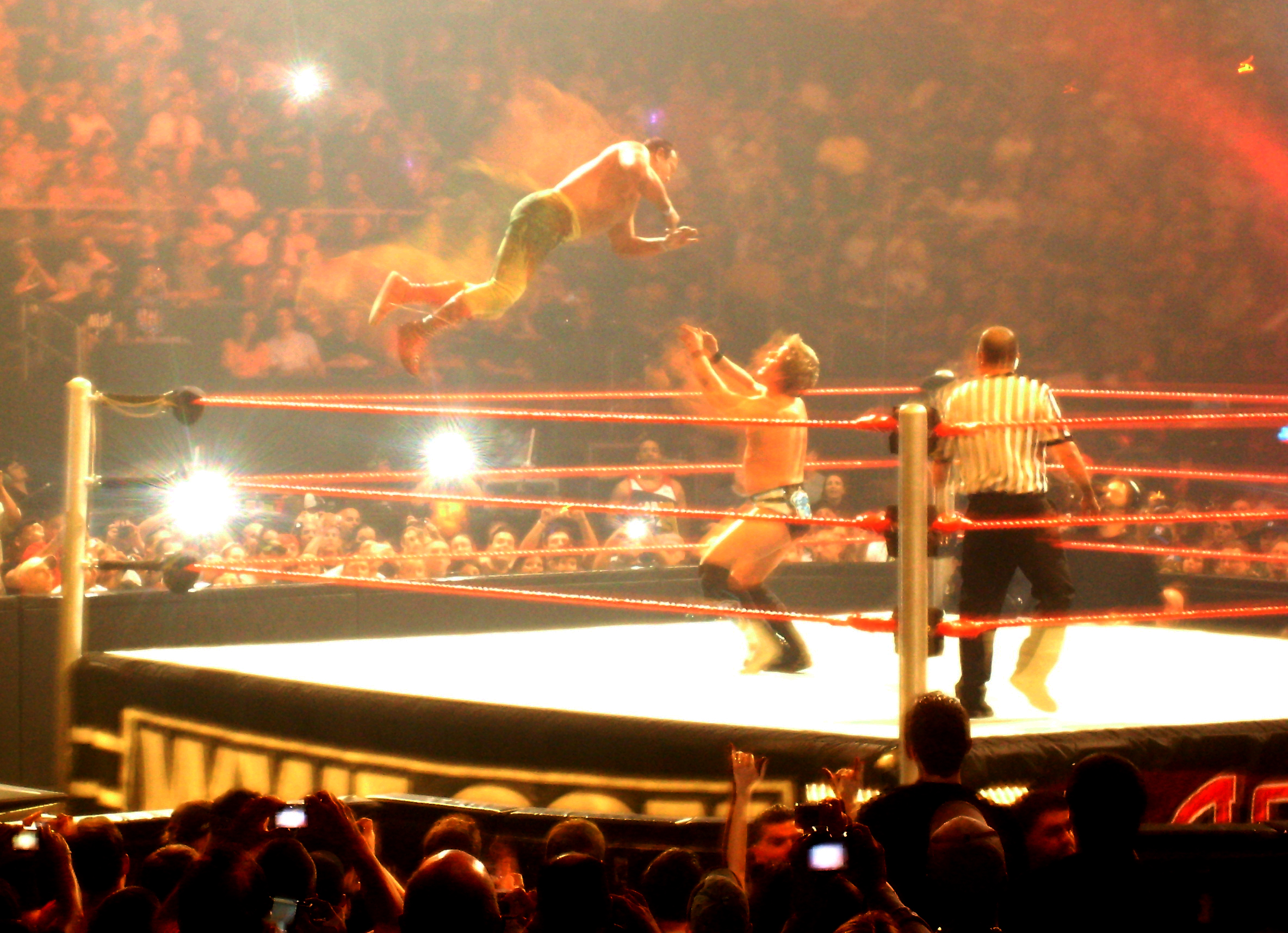
Steamboat attempting a diving crossbody on Chris Jericho at Backlash 2009

In early 2005, Steamboat returned to WWE as a producer and was introduced as a WWE Legend on the "Homecoming" edition of Raw in October 2005. In early 2006, Ricky Steamboat told WWE management that he would like to come out of retirement at WrestleMania 22 and work a match with Ric Flair, but the idea was nixed. Steamboat served as special referee in matches between John Cena, Triple H, and/or Edge at WWE house shows. In 2006 at the Raw SummerSlam Tour in Sydney, Australia, he was a referee for a match between Cena and Edge for the WWE Championship. He also refereed another title match in July 2007 between John Cena and Randy Orton in Anaheim, California. On April 1, 2007, he made an appearance at WrestleMania 23 while various other legends were having a small dance party in the background. He also briefly appeared at the Vengeance: Night of Champions pay-per-view, being recognized as a former Intercontinental Champion. He made another appearance on WWE television during Ric Flair's farewell on the March 31, 2008 edition of Raw.

Steamboat appeared on the February 23 edition of Raw, after being named one of the members of the 2009 WWE Hall of Fame class. However, Steamboat was attacked by Chris Jericho, who began to feud with the Hall of Famers. In his first match in nearly 15 years, Steamboat returned to the ring alongside Piper and Snuka to take on Jericho at WrestleMania 25 on April 5, 2009. While both Snuka and Piper were swiftly eliminated during the match, Steamboat held his own against Jericho, performing his legendary diving crossbody and even a plancha, although Jericho would eventually go on to win the match. After receiving good reviews for his performance, Steamboat was scheduled to face Jericho in another match at Backlash. However, he lost the match after submitting to the Walls of Jericho. From June to August 2009, Steamboat worked in house shows against Chris Jericho, Drew McIntrye, and Sheamus. On August 15, 2009, he teamed up with his son Richie to defeat Hiram Tua and Orlando Colon for World Wrestling Council in Puerto Rico.

==== Later WWE appearances (2010–2019) ====
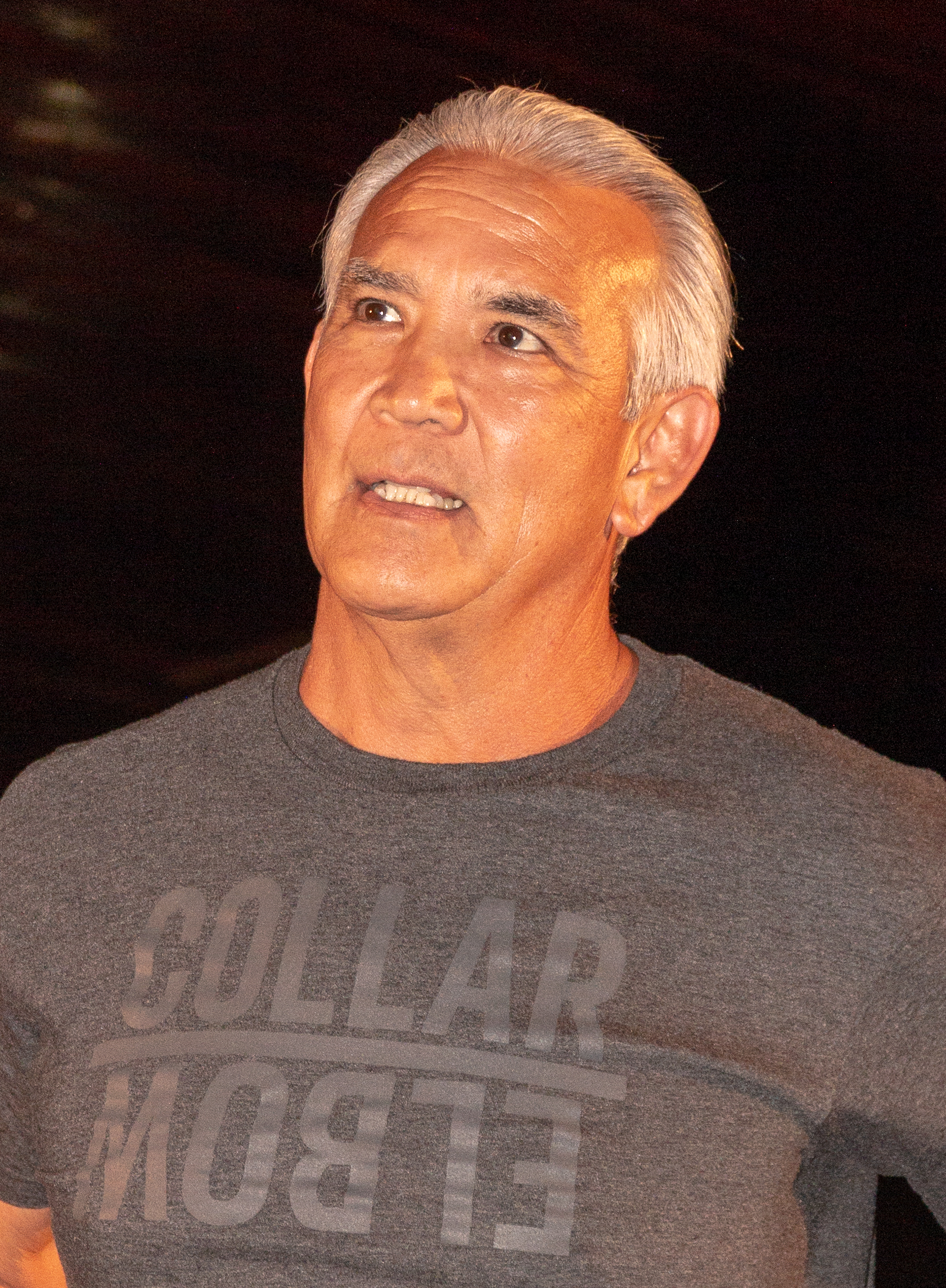
Steamboat in 2018

Steamboat's last WWE-related match was teaming with his son Richie, as they defeated Trent Barretta and Caylen Croft at Florida Championship Wrestling's Father's Day Salute on June 18, 2010.

On June 28, 2010, he returned to Raw to promote his new DVD only to be attacked and injured by The Nexus. On WWE's website the following day, it was announced that in storyline, Steamboat suffered injuries from the attack. However, on July 1, WWE's website announced that the prior night, Steamboat felt legitimate pain in his neck and shoulders and as a result, was now legitimately hospitalized. This caused WWE to take down any storyline information related to that attack. In a 2024 interview for Biography: WWE Legends, Steamboat stated that he was in the hospital for three weeks following that injury, due to bleeding between the hemispheres of his brain.

Steamboat worked as an NXT trainer and in the talent relations department with Triple H until the developmental release of his son, Richie Steamboat, in 2013. He later moved on to being an Ambassador.

Steamboat was released by WWE on July 19, 2014.

On the February 25, 2019, episode of WWE Raw, Steamboat along with special guests Shawn Michaels, Kurt Angle and Sting appeared during the main event segment to celebrate the 70th birthday of Ric Flair. However, Flair would be attacked by Batista instead of appearing on screen.

=== Later career (2022–present) ===
In his first televised appearance on TBS since 1994, Steamboat was the guest timekeeper in a match between Bryan Danielson and Daniel Garcia on the August 17, 2022 edition of AEW Dynamite.

Steamboat returned to the ring on November 27, 2022, at age 69 for the first time since his last match in 2010. He teamed with FTR (Cash Wheeler and Dax Harwood) as they defeated Nick Aldis, Jay Lethal and Brock Anderson (son of Arn Anderson) at Big Time Wrestling Return of the Dragon in Raleigh, North Carolina.

Steamboat returned to AEW on the August 5, 2023, episode of AEW Collision as a special outside enforcer for the "Real World Championship" match between CM Punk and Ricky Starks due to Starks beating Punk by cheating in their previous two matches. After the match, Starks assaulted Steamboat with Steamboat's own belt. It was later reported that Steamboat requested that he be beaten down by Starks instead of the planned finish of him chasing Starks away after the match and AEW had offered Steamboat a producer role backstage, but turned it down due to not wanting to travel weekly. On the September 2 episode of Collision, Steamboat presented a contract for a "Ricky Starks vs. The Dragon" strap match at AEW All Out to Starks. After Starks signed the contract, it was revealed that his opponent would not be Steamboat but "The American Dragon" Bryan Danielson instead. Steamboat joined the broadcast team for the match at All Out to witness Danielson defeating Starks.

Steamboat was guest timekeeper for AEW Revolution in 2024, which was billed as the final match for Sting and his tag team partner Darby Allin, who defended the AEW Tag Team Championship against Matthew and Nicholas Jackson, which was held at Greensboro Coliseum.

On November 12, 2025, Steamboat returned to AEW for the 2025 Blood and Guts special. During the event, Steamboat attempted to tell a story about meeting he and Ric Flair had in 1977, only to be interrupted by FTR. The interruption led to a confrontation, and also lead to FTR attacking Steamboat before Brodido (Brody King and Bandido) came to his aid.

== In other media ==
Steamboat appears in 14 wrestling video games; he made his video game debut in WCW: World Championship Wrestling in 1989. He later appeared in WCW SuperBrawl Wrestling in 1994 and later Legends of Wrestling in 2001, Legends of Wrestling II in 2002 and Showdown: Legends of Wrestling in 2004. He made his WWE video game debut in WWE SmackDown vs. Raw 2011 in 2010, and has since appeared in WWE All Stars, WWE '12, WWE 2K14, WWE 2K16 (two versions; one DLC), WWE 2K17 and WWE 2K18 as an unlockable character, WWE 2K19 as DLC in the game's Ric Flair-themed "Wooooo!" Collector's edition, in WWE 2K20 as an unlockable character, and in WWE 2K24 as part of the "40 Years of WrestleMania" Showcase. His most recent appearance was in WWE 2K25.

On June 2, 2024, Steamboat was the subject of the Biography: WWE Legends.

== Personal life ==
Blood is the older brother of professional wrestler Vic Steamboat. His son, Richard Jr. (born 1987), is a retired professional wrestler who wrestled under the ring name Richie Steamboat.

== Championships and accomplishments ==
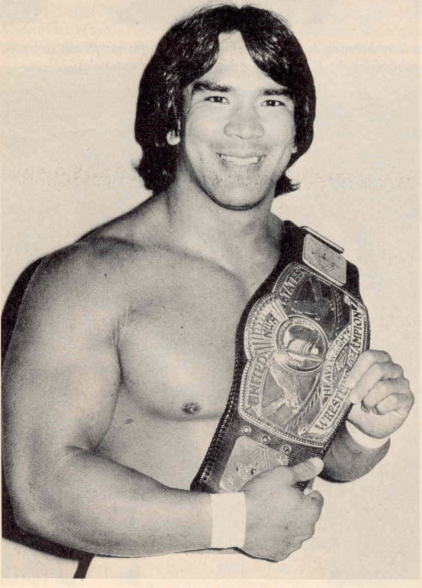
Ricky Steamboat as NWA United States Heavyweight Champion, circa 1984

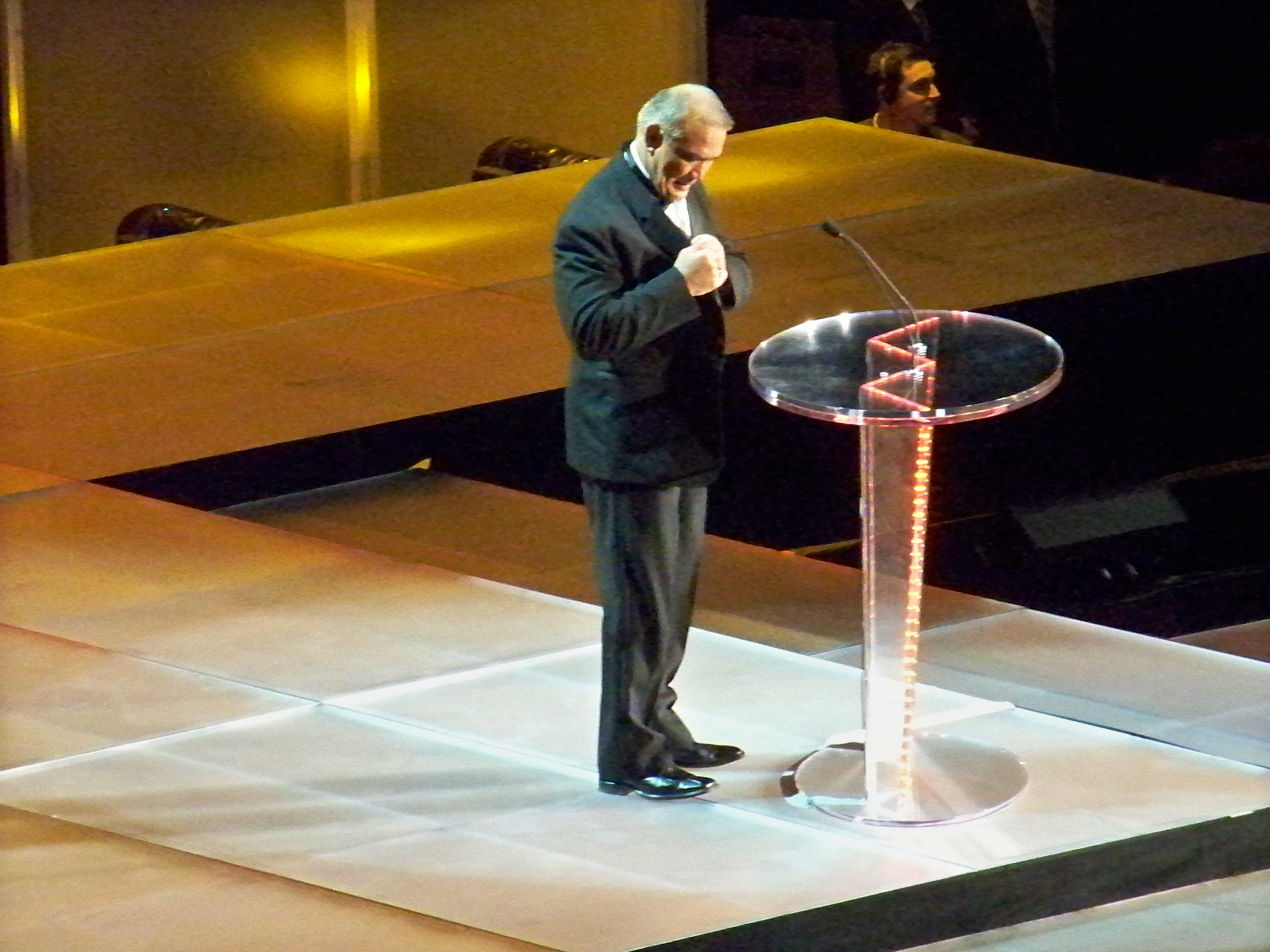
Steamboat at the 2009 WWE Hall of Fame induction ceremony

- All Japan Pro Wrestling
  - World's Strongest Tag Determination League Outstanding Performance Award (1980) – with Dick Slater
  - World's Strongest Tag Determination League Fair Play Award (1980) – with Dick Slater
  - World's Strongest Tag Determination League New Wave Award (1982) – with Jay Youngblood
- Cauliflower Alley Club
  - Lou Thesz Award (2012)
- George Tragos/Lou Thesz Professional Wrestling Hall of Fame
  - Class of 2009
- Maple Leaf Wrestling
  - NWA United States Heavyweight Championship (Mid-Atlantic version) (1 time) (Note: During this time, the title was almost exclusively defended in Mid-Atlantic Championship Wrestling. However, on occasion, the title was defended in other promotions through arrangements made with Mid-Atlantic.)
- Mid-Atlantic Championship Wrestling / World Championship Wrestling
  - NWA World Heavyweight Championship (1 time) (Note: Steamboat won the title after Ted Turner purchased Mid-Atlantic Championship wrestling from Jim Crockett and renamed it World Championship Wrestling.)
  - NWA Mid-Atlantic Heavyweight Championship (2 times)
  - NWA/WCW United States Heavyweight Championship (4 times)
  - NWA Mid-Atlantic/NWA/WCW World Television Championship (4 times)
  - NWA Mid-Atlantic Tag Team Championship (5 times) – with Paul Jones (3), Dino Bravo (1) and Jay Youngblood (1)
  - NWA/WCW World Tag Team Championship (8 times) – with Paul Jones (1), Jay Youngblood (5), Dustin Rhodes (1) and Shane Douglas (1)
- National Wrestling Alliance
  - NWA Hall of Fame (Class of 2012)
- Pro Wrestling Illustrated
  - Match of the Year (1987) vs. "Macho Man" Randy Savage at WrestleMania III
  - Match of the Year (1989) vs. Ric Flair at WrestleWar
  - Most Inspirational Wrestler of the Year (2009)
  - Rookie of the Year (1977)
  - Stanley Weston Award (1995)
  - Tag Team of the Year (1978) with Paul Jones
  - Ranked No. 6 of the 500 best singles wrestlers of the year in the PWI 500 in 1992
  - Ranked No. 13 of the Top 500 Singles Wrestlers of the "PWI Years" in 2003
  - Ranked No. 19 of the Top 100 Tag Teams of the "PWI Years" with Jay Youngblood in 2003.
- Professional Wrestling Hall of Fame and Museum
  - Class of 2002
- World Wrestling Federation/World Wrestling Entertainment
  - WWF Intercontinental Heavyweight Championship (1 time)
  - WWE Hall of Fame (Class of 2009)
- Wrestling Observer Newsletter
  - Tag Team of the Year (1983) with Jay Youngblood
  - Match of the Year (1987) vs. Macho Man Randy Savage at WrestleMania III
  - Match of the Year (1989) vs. Ric Flair at Clash of the Champions VI
  - Wrestling Observer Newsletter Hall of Fame (Class of 1996)
