= List of former Lutte Internationale personnel =

Lutte Internationale (International Wrestling) was a professional wrestling promotion based in Montreal, Quebec from 1980 to 1987. Former employees in Lutte consisted of professional wrestlers, managers, play-by-play and color commentators, announcers, interviewers and referees.

== Alumni ==
=== Male wrestlers ===
Birth name:	Ring name(s):	Tenure:	Notes
Unknown	André Malo	1984–1985	
Unknown	André Proulx	1985	
Unknown	Andy Moreuir	1983	
Unknown	Antonio Ricco	1980–1981, 1983–1985	
Unknown	Apollo the Greek / El Gran Apollo	1987 ^{3}	
Unknown	The Avenger	1981–1982	
Unknown	Billy Black Two Feathers	1981	
Unknown	Billy Strongbow	1986	
Unknown	Bob Boucher	1980, 1983–1985	
Unknown	Bob Dela Serra / The UFO	1980, 1983–1984, 1987	
Unknown	Bob Duncan	1980	
Unknown	Bob Steel	1980	
Unknown	Bull Gregory	1980–1981	
Unknown	Chin Lee	1982	
Unknown	Claude Gosselin	1984	
Unknown	Claude Hébert	1987	
Unknown	Dale Moore	1984	
Unknown	Dan Ferris	1980	
Unknown	Daniel Robert	1980	
Unknown	Denis Goulet	1983–1986	
Unknown	Diamond Jim Brady	1984	
Unknown	El Santos	1981	
Unknown	The Executioner	1986	
Unknown	Georges Guimond	1980, 1982, 1984	
Unknown	Hawaiian Punch	1987 ^{3}	
Unknown	Henri Cardinal	1984	
Unknown^{†}	Jerry O	1983	
Unknown	Jim Londos	1986	
Unknown	John White	1980–1984	
Unknown	Johnny Rapone	1984–1985	
Unknown	Johnny War Eagle	1980–1981	
Unknown	Kendo Nagasaki^{†}	1987 ^{3}	
Unknown	Kim Carlo	1986	
Unknown	The Mercenary	1986	
Unknown	Le Tigre du Ring	1984	
Unknown	Lionel Prevost	1980	
Unknown	Lionel Robert	1980	
Unknown	Lou Rock	1980	
Unknown	Ludger Proulx	1985–1986	
Unknown	Michael Gagnon	1980	
Unknown	Michael Morin	1980	
Unknown	Michael Sevigny	1981	
Unknown	Mike Golden	1986	
Unknown	Mr. Wonder	1986	
Unknown	Nick De Carlo	1986	
Unknown	Pal Chesty	1986	
Unknown	Pancho Ferraro	1981	
Unknown	Pat Murphy	1986	
Unknown	Pierre Roy	1986	
Unknown	Ray Field	1986	
Unknown	Reynald Dubé	1984–1987	
Unknown	Real Dulenis	1980	
Unknown	Reggie Rapone	1984–1986	
Unknown	Richard Tessier	1983–1984	
Unknown	Rocky Dela Serra	1984–1987	
Unknown	Rudy Burke	1985	
Unknown	Scott Duran	1985	
Unknown	Sonny Boy	1983–1985, 1986	
Unknown	Tiger Chen Lee	1986	
Unknown	Tito Senza^{†}	1980–1981, 1983	
Unknown	The Terrible Viking	1981	
Unknown	Tommy Russo	1983	
Unknown	Tony Gatillo	1986–1987	
Unknown	Tony Rashe	1980	
Unknown	Yvan Vincent	1985	
Unknown	Yvon Laverdure	1984–1987	
Ángel Acevedo	The Cuban Assassin	1985 ^{3}	
Dino Acocella	Gino Brito Jr.	1983–1987	
Louis Acocella	Gino Brito, Sr.	1980–1987	
Katsuji Adachi ^{†}	Mr. Hito	1982–1983	
Louis Albano ^{†}	Lou Albano	1980	
Samula Anoaʻi	The Great Samoo / Mr. Samu	1985–1986	
Bob Backlund	Bob Backlund	1980, 1982	
Dennis Baldock	Bobby Bass	1981	
Roland Barriault	Frenchie Lamont	1985	
Robert Bédard^{†}	René Goulet	1985, 1986	
Józef Bednarski	Ivan Putski	1981, 1985	
Dick Beyer^{†}	The Destroyer	1980–1984	
Jerry Blackwell ^{†}	Crusher Blackwell	1984	
Richard Blood	Ricky Steamboat	1985, 1987 ^{4}	
Nick Bockwinkel^{†}	Nick Bockwinkel	1983–1986 ^{1}	
Terry Bollea^{†}	Hulk Hogan	1980, 1986	
Larry Booker ^{†}	Moondog Spot	1985 ^{4}	
Adolfo Bresciano ^{†}	Dino Bravo	1980–1987	
Timothy Brooks^{†}	Buster Brown Brody	1987	
Kerry Brown ^{†}	Rick Valentine	1983–1985	
Jim Brunzell	Jim Brunzell	1983–1984 ^{1}	
Ray Canty ^{†}	Kareem Muhammad	1986	
Richard Charland	Richard Charland	1980–1987	
Pierre Clermont^{†}	Pat Patterson	1980, 1982–1983	
Leonce Cormier ^{†}	Leo Burke	1983–1985, 1987	
Romeo Cormier^{†}	Bobby Kay	1981–1982	
Daniel Côté^{†}	Gorman Purdy	1981	
Ruben Cruz^{†}	Hercules Ayala	1986–1987 ^{3}	
Dominic DeNucci ^{†}	Dominic DeNucci	1984	
Steve DiSalvo	Steve Strong	1986–1987	
Mark Dumer	Jason the Terrible	1987 ^{3}	
Serge Dumont	Serge Dumont	1980	
Bill Eadie	The Masked Superstar	1983–1985	
Conrad Efraim ^{†}	S. D. Jones	1985 ^{4}	
Gerard Ethifier]] ^{†}	Gerry Morrow	1986	
Ed Farhat ^{†}	The Sheik	1987	
Wayne Farris	The Honky Tonk Man	1987	
Sam Fatu	The Tonga Kid	1985–1987	
Solofa Fatu Jr.	Prince Alofa	1986	
Raymond Fernandez ^{†}	Hercules Hernandez	1985 ^{4}	
Tonga Fifita	King Tonga	1984–1987	
Richard Fliehr	Ric Flair	1984, 1986	
Keith Franke ^{†}	Adrian Adonis	1985–1986 ^{4}	
Stan Frazier ^{†}	Uncle Elmer	1985 ^{4}	
Dory Funk Jr.	Hoss Funk	1986 ^{4}	
Terry Funk^{†}	Terry Funk	1985	
Hubert Gallant	Hubert Gallant	1981, 1983	
Greg Gagne	Greg Gagne	1983–1984 ^{1}	
Jean Gagné^{†}	Frenchy Martin	1983–1986	
Richard Garza ^{†}	Mighty Igor	1984	
Frank Goodish ^{†}	Bruiser Brody	1986–1987	
Neil Guay	Le Bourreau (The Hangman)	1980–1984, 1986–1987	
John Hanson II	Stan Hansen	1982, 1986	
Robert Hanson ^{†}	Swede Hanson	1980–1981	
James Harris^{†}	Kamala	1986	
Ian Hodgkinson	Ian Richards/Gene Anderson/Billy Fury	1984-1987	
James Janos	Jesse Ventura	1985	
Brian Jewel	Joe Lightfoot / Joe Ventura	1982, 1985–1986	
Dan Johnson ^{†}	Bull Johnson / Danny Johnson	1982, 1986	
Toshiaki Kawada	Toshiaki	1986	
Lanny Kean ^{†}	Cousin Junior	1985 ^{4}	
Stephen Ketcher^{†}	Steve Gatorwolf	1985	
David Kochen	Buddy Lane	1986	
Pierre Lafleur^{†}	Max Lebeouf / Max Zarinoff / Zarinoff Lebeouf	1982	
Philip Lafond	Phil LaFon / Dan Kroffat	1984–1987	
Michel Lamarche^{†}	Michel DuBois	1980–1982	
Louis Laurence	Louis Laurence	1980–1983	
Pierre Lefebvre ^{‡}	Pierre Lefebvre	1980–1985	
Larry Liger^{†}	The Great Malumba	1983	
Steve Lombardi	The Brooklyn Brawler	1985 ^{4}	
Jacques Magnin^{†}	Jacky Wiecz / Jacky Weickz	1980–1981	
Mike McCord	Austin Idol	1986	
Rick McGraw ^{†}	Rick McGraw	1981–1982, 1985	
John Minton ^{†}	Big John Studd	1981–1982, 1985–1986	
Mike Moore (wrestler)	Man Mountain Moore	1986	
Angelo Mosca^{†}	Angelo Mosca	1986	
Don Muraco	Don Muraco	1985–1986	
Jim Myers^{†}	George "The Animal" Steele	1986 ^{4}	
Robert Nutt^{†}	Ron Starr	1985	
Bob Orton, Jr.	Bob Orton, Jr.	1985–1986 ^{4}	
Randal Orton^{†}	Barry O	1985 ^{4}	
Gustave Ouimet^{†}	Géant Gustave	1986	
Masashi Ozawa^{†}	Killer Khan	1981	
Chris Pallies^{†}	King Kong Bundy	1985–1986, 1987 ^{4}	
Kenneth Patera	Ken Patera	1984 ^{1}	
Paul Pellerin	Paul Peller	1981, 1983–1984	
Michael Penzel^{†}	Corporal Kirchner	1985–1986 ^{4}	
Stephen Petitpas	Sheik Ali / Steve Petitpas	1980, 1985–1987	
Michel Pigeon ^{†}	Jos LeDuc	1984–1986	
Lanny Poffo ^{†}	Lanny Poffo	1985 ^{4}	
Randy Poffo ^{†}	Randy Savage	1985–1986, 1987	
Luc Poirier	La Merveille Masquée (The Masked Marvel) / The Mercenary	1983–1984	
Gilles Poisson	Gilles Poisson	1980–1984, 1986–1987	
Garfield Portz	Scott McGee	1985 ^{4}	
Antonio Pugliese^{†}	Tony Parisi	1982–1986	
John Quinn^{†}	John Quinn	1984	
Harley Race^{†}	Harley Race	1987	
Robert Rancourt	Robert Rancourt / Suni War Cloud / Sunny War Cloud	1984–1987	
James Raschke	Baron von Raschke	1984 ^{1}	
Rick Rechsteiner	Rick Steiner	1985	
Bruce Reed^{†}	Butch Reed	1985, 1987 ^{2}	
Robert Remus	Sgt. Slaughter	1980, 1986	
Tony Ricco	Tony Ricco	1980, 1983–1984, 1986–1987	
Sylvester Ritter ^{†}	Junkyard Dog	1985, 1986	
Billy Robinson ^{†}	Billy Robinson	1982–1984	
Johnny Rodriguez	Abdullah Java Ruuk	1980	
Mike Rotunda	Mike Rotundo	1982	
Armand Rougeau	Armand Rougeau	1982–1987	
Jacques Rougeau Sr.^{†}	Jacques Rougeau Sr.	1985	
André Roussimoff ^{†}	André the Giant / Le Géant Ferré	1980–1983, 1985	
Ronald Rychliski	Ron Ritchie	1986	
David Sammartino	Bruno Sammartino, Jr.	1983–1984	
David Schultz	David Schults	1986	
Verne Seibert	Verne Seibert / The Spoiler	1986–1987	
Mike Sharpe^{†}	Iron Mike Sharpe	1985–1986 ^{4}	
Mike Shaw ^{†}	Mike Shaw	1984	
Len Shelley	Len Shelley	1980–1981	
David Sherwin ^{†}	Goldie Rogers	1986	
Larry Shreve	Abdullah the Butcher	1981–1987	
Reginald Siki^{†}	Sweet Daddy Siki	1986–1987	
Chuck Simpson	Chuck Simms	1986–1987	
Davey Boy Smith ^{†}	Davey Boy Smith	1987	
Jimmy Snuka^{†}	Jimmy Snuka	1983	
Merced Solis	Tito Santana	1985–1986, 1987 ^{4}	
Carl Stevens ^{†}	Ray Stevens	1983	
Bill Terry ^{†}	Kurt Von Hess	1983	
Tourville, Camille ^{‡}	Tarzan Tyler	1980, 1984–1985	
Tomomi Tsuruta ^{†}	Jumbo Tsuruta	1984	
Maurice Vachon ^{†}	Mad Dog Vachon	1981, 1984, 1986	
Paul Vachon^{†}	Butcher Vachon	1980	
Hossein Vaziri ^{†}	The Iron Sheik	1985–1986 ^{4}	
Nelson Veilleux	Nelson Veilleux	1984, 1986	
Rick Vigneault	Rick Martel	1980, 1982–1983, 1984–1986	
Kevin Wacholz	Kevin Kelly	1984–1985	
James Ware	Koko B. Ware	1987 ^{4}	
Édouard Weiczorkiewicz ^{†}	Édouard Carpentier	1980–1984	
Larry Weil ^{†}	Larry Sharpe	1980	
George Wells	George Wells	1985–1986 ^{4}	
Anthony White	Tony Atlas	1985–1986	
Ed White ^{†}	Sailor White	1980–1986	
James Williams	Jimmy Garvin	1985–1986	
Robert Windham ^{†}	Blackjack Mulligan	1983–1984 ^{1}	
Jonathan Wisniski	Greg Valentine	1982, 1985	
Tom Zenk ^{†}	Tom Zenk	1985–1986	

=== Female wrestlers ===
Birth name:	Ring name(s):	Tenure:	Notes
Unknown	Christina Cortez		
Unknown	Janet Doyle	1980	
Unknown	Lisa Raymond	1980	
Unknown	Suzan Starr	1986	
Winona Barkley^{†}	The Lock	1986	
Candace Rummel^{†}	Candi Devine	1986	
Mary Ellison ^{†}	The Fabulous Moolah / Spider Lady	1985, 1986 ^{4}	
Peggy Lee^{†}	Peggy Lee	1986	
Wendi Richter	Wendi Richter	1985 ^{4}	
Sherri Russell ^{†}	Sherri Martel	1986	
Diane Vachon ^{†}	Vivian Vachon	1986	

=== Midget wrestlers ===
Birth name:	Ring name(s):	Tenure:	Notes
Unknown	Little T	1985	
Unknown	Poncho Boy	1983–1985	
Marcel Gauthier ^{†}	Sky Low Low	1980, 1986	
Jean Girard ^{†}	Little Brutus	1981, 1986	
Claude Giroux	Tiger Jackson	1981, 1983–1987	
Lionel Giroux ^{†}	Little Beaver	1980, 1983–1986	

=== Stables and tag teams ===
Tag team/Stable(s)	Members	Tenure(s)
The British Bulldogs	Davey Boy Smith^{†} and The Dynamite Kid^{†}	1986 ^{4}
The Dela Serra Brothers	Bob Dela Serra and Rocky Dela Serra	1984, 1986
Destruction Inc.	Destruction I and Destruction II	1985
The Dream Team	Greg Valentine and Brutus Beefcake	1985 ^{4}
El Lobos	El Lobo I and El Lobo II	1986
The Fabulous Freebirds	Michael Hayes, Terry Gordy^{†}, and Buddy Roberts^{†}	1986
The Garvins	Ronnie and Jimmy Garvin	1985
The Hart Foundation	Bret Hart and Jim Neidhart^{†}	1985–1986, 1987 ^{4}
Les Anges Blonds		1980
The Road Warriors	Road Warrior Hawk^{†} & Road Warrior Animal^{†}	1985, 1986 ^{2}
Rougeau Brothers	Jacques Rougeau, Jr. and Raymond Rougeau	1980–1986
The Killer Bees	Jim Brunzell and B. Brian Blair	1985
The Long Riders	Bill and Scott Irwin^{†}	1986
The Moondogs	Moondog Rex^{†} and Moondog Spot^{†}	1986 ^{4}
The New Guinea Headhunters	Tio and Tapu	1987 ^{3}
Nikolai Volkoff & The Iron Sheik	Nikolai Volkoff^{†} and The Iron Sheik ^{†}	1985 ^{4}
Rick Steiner & Scott Duran	Rick Steiner and Scott Duran	1985
The Samoans	Afa^{†} and Sika^{†}	1983, 1985

=== Managers and valets ===
Birth name:	Ring name(s):	Tenure:	Notes
Alfred Hayes ^{†}	Lord Alfred Hayes	1982–1984	
Eddie Creatchman ^{†}	Eddie Creatchman	1980–1987	
Floyd Creatchman ^{†}	Floyd Creatchman	1986–1987	
Paul Ellering	Paul Ellering	1985, 1986	
Deepak Massand^{†}	Deepak Singh	1987	

=== Commentators and interviewers ===
Birth name:	Ring name(s):	Tenure:	Notes
Louis Acocella	Gino Brito, Sr.	1984–1987	
Milt Avruskin^{†}	Milt Avruskin	1985–1986	
Andre Belisle	André Belisle	1984–1986	
Guy Cardinal	Guy Cardinal		Ring announcer
Floyd Creatchman^{†}	Floyd Creatchman	1986–1987	
Ron Francis	Ron Francis	1987	
Guy Hauray^{†}	Guy Hauray	1980–1984	
Jacques Tremblay	Jacques Tremblay		Ring announcer
Édouard Weiczorkiewicz ^{†}	Édouard Carpentier	1980–1984	

=== Referees ===
Birth name:	Ring name(s):	Tenure:	Notes
Eugene Brie	Eugene Brie		
Adrien Desbois ^{‡}	Adrien Desbois	1984–1985	
Paul LeDuc	Paul LeDuc	1984	
Luigi Macera ^{†}	Luigi Macera		
Omer Marchessault ^{†}	Omer Marchessault		
Andre Roy ^{†}	Andre Roy	1980–1987	Senior referee

Company name to Year
Company name:	Years:
Promotions Varoussac	1980–1984
Lutte Internationale / International Wrestling	1984–1987
Notes
^{†} Indicates they are deceased.
^{‡} Indicates they died while they were employed with Lutte Internationale.
^{1} Indicates they were part of a talent exchange with the American Wrestling Association.
^{2} Indicates they were part of a talent exchange with Pro Wrestling USA.
^{3} Indicates they were part of a talent exchange with the World Wrestling Council.
^{4} Indicates they were part of a talent exchange with the World Wrestling Federation.
