= Dino Bravo =

Canadian professional wrestler (1948–1993)

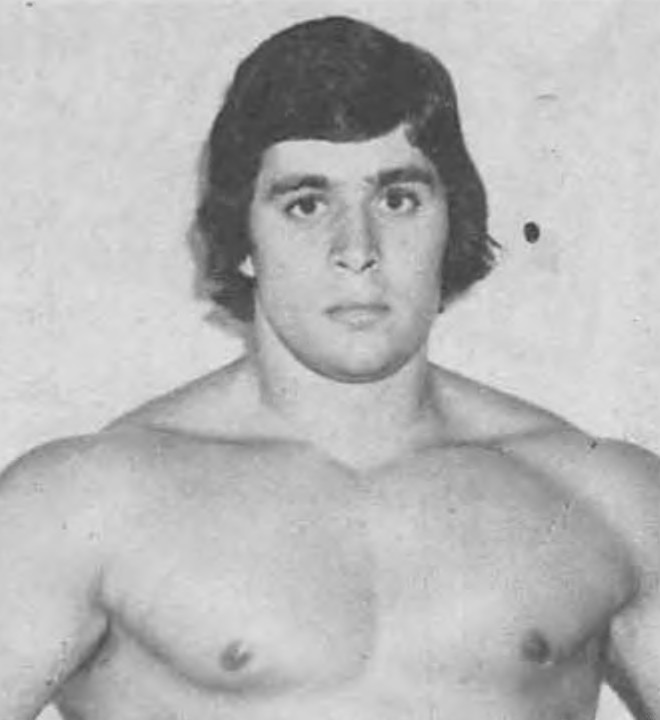
- Bravo, circa 1979

Personal information
- Born: Adolfo Bresciano; 6 August 1948 Campobasso, Molise, Italy
- Died: 10 March 1993 (aged 44) Laval, Quebec, Canada
- Cause of death: Gunshot wounds
- Relative: Vincenzo Cotroni (uncle-in-law)

Professional wrestling career
- Billed height: 6 ft 0 in (183 cm)
- Billed weight: 248 lb (112 kg)
- Billed from: Montreal, Quebec, Canada
- Trained by: Gino Brito
- Debut: 1970
- Retired: May 15, 1992

Adolfo Bresciano (Italian: [aˈdɔlfo breʃˈʃaːno]; August 6, 1948 – March 10, 1993), better known by the ring name Dino Bravo (Italian: [ˈdiːno ˈbraːvo]), was an Italian-Canadian professional wrestler and promoter and alleged organized crime figure.

After training under Gino Brito, Bravo started his career in Montreal in the 1970s, working for Lutte Internationale. He became one of the top wrestling stars of Canada; winning several major titles including the Canadian International Heavyweight Championship six times, the NWA Canadian Heavyweight Championship (Toronto version) and the NWA Mid-Atlantic Tag Team Championship. He later signed with the World Wide Wrestling Federation (now World Wrestling Entertainment), where as a partner to Dominic DeNucci he won the WWWF World Tag Team Championship. Bravo was also the sole holder of the WWF Canadian Championship before the title was abandoned in 1986.

After leaving professional wrestling, Bravo became involved in organized crime, allegedly working for the Cotroni crime family of Montreal. He was killed in an apparent gangland slaying at his Laval, Quebec home by multiple gunshots in March 1993. His murder remains unsolved.

== Early life ==
Adolfo Bresciano was born in the comune of Campobasso, Molise, Italy, to Cecilia (née Cacchione) and Mario (later Maurice) Bresciano. The family emigrated to Canada when Bresciano was young, settling in the Centre-Sud neighbourhood of the Montreal borough of Ville-Marie. Bresciano started training in amateur wrestling from the age of 12.

== Professional wrestling career ==
=== Early career (1970-1972) ===
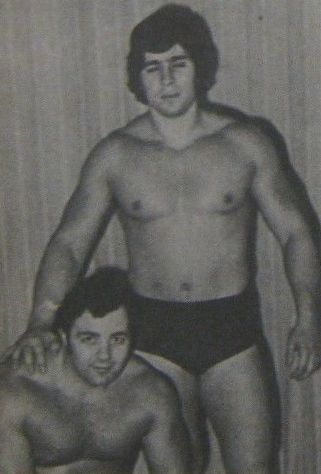
Bravo in June 1975 with trainer Gino Brito

Bresciano began wrestling in 1970, taking the name "Dino Bravo" from a wrestler from the early 1960s who had teamed with Dominic DeNucci as the Bravo Brothers, Dino and Dominic. He was trained by Gino Brito and often worked in a tag team with his mentor, billed as Brito's cousin.

=== Grand Prix Wrestling (1972–1974) ===
Bravo made his debut in Grand Prix Wrestling on August 25, 1972, defeating Frenchy Martin at a match in Quebec City. In November 1972 he began teaming with Brito, and on November 20 the duo captured what would be Bravo's first title when they defeated Gilles Poisson and Killer Kowalski to capture the Grand Prix Tag Team Championship. The team would continue into 1973, facing Poisson and Kowalksi in rematches, as well as taking on the Vachons (Butcher Vachon and Mad Dog Vachon). Bravo and Brito finally lost the titles on July 24, 1974, when they were defeated by the Cuban Assassins in Truro, Nova Scotia.

=== NWA Hollywood (1974–1975) ===
Bravo then jumped to NWA Hollywood, making his debut on November 7, 1974, in Bakersfield, California, and pinning The Canadian Wolfman. Teaming with Victor Rivera, he soon captured the NWA Hollywood Tag-Team Championship and defended against teams such as Gilles Poisson and Don Arnold. They also faced the duo of Greg Valentine and John Tolos, and the Hollywood Blondes (Buddy Roberts and Jerry Brown).

=== International Wrestling Association (1975) ===
Reforming his team with Brito, the two jumped to the International Wrestling Association (IWA) on March 9, 1975, but were defeated in their debut by IWA Tag-Team Champions The Mongols in Charlotte, North Carolina. The loss was just the start of a series of matches between the two teams, but Bravo and Brito were unable to capture the IWA tag-team titles. Bravo ventured into singles competition extensively for the first time in his career and challenged Bulldog Brower for the IWA North American Championship in Roanoke, Virginia, on July 7, 1975. Browser defeated Bravo via disqualification. Bravo earned rematches in August and September 1975, but each match saw the victor only win via disqualification.

=== Georgia Championship Wrestling (1975–1976) ===
After a brief stop in Maple Leaf Wrestling in November 1975, Bravo travelled to another National Wrestling Alliance territory in Georgia Championship Wrestling (GCW). Bravo made his debut on December 5, 1975, and battled Tony Charles to a draw at a house show in Atlanta, Georgia. After going undefeated against Beautiful Bruce, Roger Kirby and Ron Starr, Bravo formed a team with Jerry Brisco. The new team faced other GCW tandems of the time, including Rip Hawk and Roger Kirby, Bob Orton Jr. and Bob Roop, Karl Von Steiger and the Alaskan (Jay York) and Frank Goodish and the Missouri Mauler (Larry Hamilton).

=== Mid Atlantic Championship Wrestling (1976–1977) ===
Bravo then traveled north to Mid-Atlantic Championship Wrestling, defeating Gene Anderson on April 26, 1976 in Winston-Salem, North Carolina. He formed a new team with DeNucci and "Mr. Wrestling" Tim Woods. Bravo held the Jim Crockett Promotions version of the NWA World Tag Team Championship with Woods, winning the title from Gene and Ole Anderson on in a televised match in Raleigh, North Carolina, on May 5, 1976.

Bravo and Woods engaged in a feud with the Andersons, defeating them that summer in multiple house show matches. The champions were also successful in defenses against Bolo Mongol and Boris Malenko, and Angelo Mosca and Blackjack Mulligan. However, on June 28, 1976, their run came to an end when the Andersons regained the tag-team championship in Greenville, South Carolina. The feud continued for the remainder of the summer and into the fall.

On November 3, 1976, Bravo and Woods were able to capture the titles once more, defeating Jacques Goulet and Michel Lamarche in a tournament for the vacated NWA Mid-Atlantic Tag Team Championship. Their second reign lasted until January 17, 1977, when the Hollywood Blondes defeated them at a house show in Greenville, North Carolina. The following day, Bravo and Woods unsuccessfully challenged Ric Flair and Greg Valentine for the NWA World Tag-Team Championship.

Bravo re-entered singles competition and challenged Blackjack Mulligan for the NWA United States Heavyweight Championship at a house show in Raleigh, North Carolina, defeating the champion via countout on March 29, 1977. This began a major program with Mulligan that saw Bravo pin Mulligan twice in a televised non-title match to set up a series of matches for Mulligan's United States title.

At the same time, Bravo formed a new partnership with Tiger Conway Jr. and defeated the Hollywood Blondes on April 10, 1977, to recapture the Mid-Atlantic Tag-Team Championship. While champion, he continued to challenge Mulligan for the United States Championship but was unsuccessful, losing by disqualification or countout as well as getting pinned multiple times.

On May 31, 1977, Bravo earned his first shot at the NWA World Heavyweight Championship, facing champion Harley Race in Raleigh, North Carolina. Bravo was pinned, but a few days later on June 3 battled the champion to a time limit draw. After unsuccessfully challenging Race and Mulligan for their respective singles championships, Bravo and Conway lost the Mid Atlantic titles to Flair and Valentine on June 30, 1977, in Anderson, South Carolina.

=== Georgia Championship Wrestling (1977–1978) ===
Bravo returned to GCW on July 23, 1977, and defeated Roger Smith at a television taping. Three days later he faced Randy Savage for the first time, pinning him at a house show in Atlanta.

=== World Wide Wrestling Federation (1978) ===
Traveling north, Bravo made his debut for the World Wide Wrestling Federation (WWWF, now WWE) at a televised match in Philadelphia on January 31, 1978, defeating Frank Marconi. Bravo quickly formed a team with Dominic DeNucci, with the duo appearing together for the first time on the March 4, 1978, episode of Championship Wrestling with a victory over Baron Mikel Scicluna and former WWWF Champion Stan Stasiak.

On the March 18 episode of Championship Wrestling, Bravo and DeNucci defeated WWWF World Tag Team Champions Mr. Fuji and Toru Tanaka in a non-title match. Two weeks later, on the April 1, they had a rematch for the title, and Bravo and DeNucci captured the WWWF Tag Team Championship. After successfully retaining against Fuji and Tanaka, the duo defended against a variety of teams including Johnny Rodz and José Estrada, Luke Graham and "Superstar" Billy Graham, and Scicluna and Stasiak. The Yukon Lumberjacks defeated Bravo and DeNucci to capture the WWWF Tag-Team Championship in a match taped on June 26 in Madison Square Garden.

After unsuccessfully challenging the Lumberjacks in a series of rematches, Bravo moved on to singles competition and defeated "Superstar" Billy Graham via disqualification in multiple matches. He then began a house show series with Luke Graham in the fall of 1978. On the November 18, 1978, episode of Championship Wrestling, he teamed again with DeNucci to challenge the Yukon Lumberjacks; the former champions won by disqualification. Bravo's final WWWF match came on December 30, 1978, where he was defeated by Víctor Rivera.

=== Maple Leaf Wrestling / Mid Atlantic Championship Wrestling (1978–1979) ===
By the late 1970s, Bravo had become a big enough draw to get a singles push in the Montreal territory. While still finishing up his WWWF commitments, Bravo jumped to Maple Leaf Wrestling and defeated Rocky Della Serra in a televised match on December 16, 1978. One day later he faced Gene Kiniski in a match for the vacated NWA Canadian Heavyweight Championship, and secured his first ever singles title.

On January 14, 1979, the new champion faced AWA World Heavyweight Champion Nick Bockwinkle at Maple Leaf Gardens, defeating the outside champion via disqualification.

While still holding the NWA Heavyweight Championship, Bravo returned to Mid-Atlantic to engage in a series of matches with Greg Valentine in January 1979. Bravo also defeated Ric Flair in singles action on January 20, 1979 in Spartanburg, South Carolina. "The Nature Boy" then travelled to Maple Leaf Wrestling to challenge Bravo for his Canadian championship on February 4, 1979, and again Bravo was victorious. Greg Valentine then traveled to Toronto on March 25 and was in turn beaten by Bravo. However, on April 8 Valentine defeated Bravo in a no disqualification match in Toronto to capture the Canadian Heavyweight title.

Dino Bravo then toured Mid Atlantic in April, facing United States Champion Ric Flair on April 10 in Raleigh, North Carolina. Falling in defeat, Bravo then challenged Ken Patera two days later for the Mid Atlantic Heavyweight Title and lost via disqualification. Bravo returned to Maple Leaf Wrestling in May. He faced Canadian Champion Greg Valentine on June 30, 1979 in Toronto and regained his title.

=== American Wrestling Association (1979–1981) ===
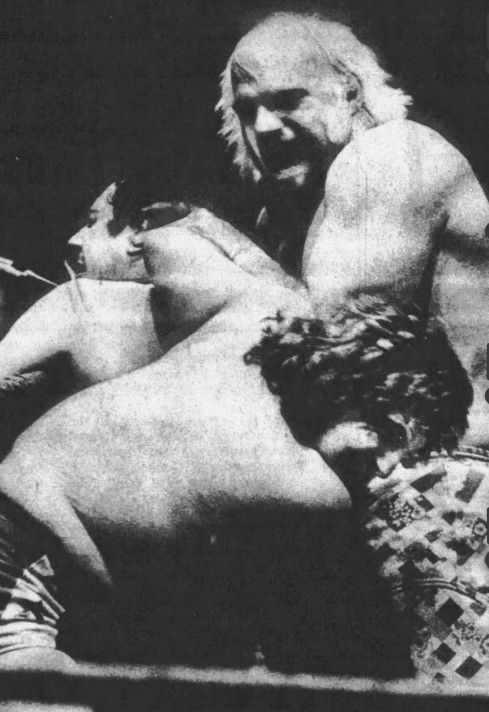
Bravo and Greg Gagne face off against Jesse Ventura, 1980

Bravo forfeited the Canadian Heavyweight Championship in September 1979 and moved to the American Wrestling Association a month later, making his debut as part of a 17 man battle royal (won by Andre the Giant) in an event held in St Paul, Minnesota on October 23, 1979. Bravo was undefeated in singles competition, defeating Buddy Wolff, Super Destroyer Mark II (Sgt Slaughter), Sonny Driver, Lord Alfred Hayes, until finally losing to Adrian Adonis on January 27, 1980 in Green Bay, Wisconsin.

On February 2, 1980 he earned a shot at the AWA Heavyweight Championship and defeated titleholder Nick Bockwinkel via disqualification. Bravo also formed a team with Greg Gagne and had a series of matches with The East-West Connection (Jesse Ventura and Adrian Adonis). After the latter duo gained the AWA Tag Team Championship Bravo & Gagne unsuccessfully challenged for the titles in several house shows. His final match came on January 25, 1981 when he defeated Ben DeLeon on AWA All Star Wrestling.

=== New Japan Pro-Wrestling (1981–1982) ===
While still wrestling for Varoussac, Bravo ventured overseas for the first time and participated in a tour of Japan with New Japan Pro-Wrestling (NJPW). He made his debut for the promotion on a televised event on October 8, 1981, teaming with Riki Choshu in a loss to Hulk Hogan and Stan Hansen. Bravo went on to defeat Ryuma Go, Yoshiaki Fujiwara, Kantaro Hoshino, Kengo Kimura and Osamu Kido as the tour ran from October to November.

Bravo returned for a second tour with NJPW one year later, teaming with Adrian Adonis to face Seiji Sakaguchi and Tatsumi Fujinami in the MSG Tag Team League on November 19, 1982. Teaming with Adonis he enjoyed limited success, defeating Canek and Perro Aguayo but losing to Dick Murdoch and Masked Superstar and Antonio Inoki and Hulk Hogan, amongst others. His tour ended on December 10, 1982, with Bravo teaming with André the Giant to defeat Abdullah the Butcher and Billy Robinson in Tokyo.

=== International Wrestling (1981–1986) ===
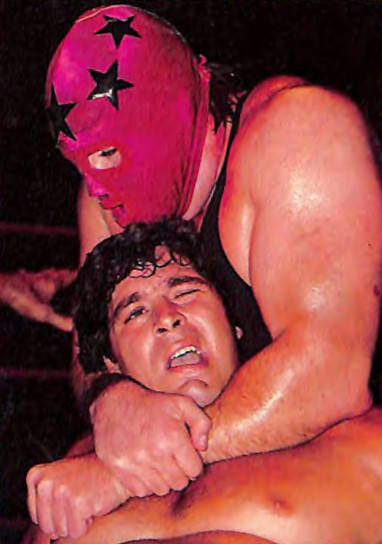
Bravo (bottom) facing the Masked Superstar, c. 1983

After departing the AWA Bravo joined Varoussac Promotions (the future International Wrestling, a promotion owned by Andre the Giant, Frank Valois, and Gino Brito. Appearing at a TV taping on April 5, 1981 he defeated Smasher Stone (Jim Lancaster).

Bravo would ultimately gain the International Heavyweight Championship in 1981 and defeated Sailor White in Montreal on December 14, 1981. On January 25, 1982 he faced Abdullah the Butcher for the first time and battled the challenger to a no contest. On April 12, 1982 Stan Hanssen challenged Bravo for the title, with the match also ending in a no contest. Bravo would later lose the title to Sailor White.

In 1983 Varoussac Promotions became International Wrestling. Andre the Giant dropped out of the ownership group, and Bravo became a partial owner of the Canadian company. Dino regained the company's championship on March 7, 1983 by defeating Billy Robinson in Montreal. He successfully retained against Sailor White on November 21, 1983 and defeated Nick Bockwinkle on December 26, 1983 in Montreal.

A return match was granted on January 16, 1984 where Bravo challenged Nick Bockwinkle once more for his AWA World Heavyweight Championship. The match would once more be in Montreal, but Dino was only able to win via disqualification. Bravo then formed a new team with Tony Parisi and challenged Frenchy Martin & Pierre Lefebvre for the Canadian Tag-Team Championship, winning the belts on February 20. Bravo & Parisi would then successfully defend against Abdullah the Butcher & Sailor White before losing the titles back to Martin & Lefebvre in June 1984.

Meanwhile, Bravo continued to hold the International Heavyweight Championship, defending against Rick Martel and Billy Robinson as the year progressed. On August 14, 1984 he defeated King Tonga via disqualification, but the following month his over one year reign ended when he lost the title to Toga at an event in Hull on September 10. Bravo would then regain the title from King Tonga at an event in Montreal on February 11, 1985 in a match whose special referee was Verne Gagne.

In March 1985 AWA World Tag-Team Champions The Road Warriors traveled to International Wrestling and were challenged by Rick Martel and International Champion Dino Bravo. The two teams faced on March 27 in Quebec City, with the Warriors winning via disqualification. Bravo & Martel defeated the Warriors via disqualification the following month.

Bravo began defending his International Heavyweight Championship on joint International Wrestling / WWF shows later in the year, including defeating Nikolai Volkoff on November 10, 1985 on Prime Time Wrestling.

Kamala challenged Dino Bravo for his championship on March 30, 1986 in Montreal but lost via disqualification. On June 30, 1986 Samu defeated Bravo to capture the International title in Montreal. Dino faced Samu in a rematch on August 12, 1986 in Montreal but battled him to a double disqualification. Bravo's last match with International Wrestling came on September 8, when he teamed with Rick Martel to defeat Bob Della Serra & Sheik Ali.

=== World Wrestling Federation (1985–1992) ===
==== WWF Canadian Champion (1985–1986) ====
After a seven year absence, Bravo returned to the now World Wrestling Federation on August 20, 1985 at a Championship Wrestling taping. In a segment that would air on the September 7, 1985 edition of the show, Bravo was introduced by ring announcer Howard Finkel as the WWF Canadian Heavyweight Champion. His first match came six days later in Montreal, where he teamed with King Tonga to defeat The Iron Sheik and Nikolai Volkoff. Bravo's first televised match came on September 28 edition of All Star Wrestling when he teamed again with King Tonga to defeat Gino Carabello and A. J. Petrucci.

Bravo continued to team with Tonga that fall, with the team scoring a notable upset victory over The Dream Team in Montreal on September 23, 1985. The duo's first loss came on October 14, when they were defeated by the Dream Team in a rematch in the same city. Still billed as the Canadian Heavyweight Champion, Bravo ventured into singles competition on November 26, 1985 edition of Prime Time Wrestling and defeated Nikolai Volkoff. On December 1 he defeated Randy Savage via countout at a joint International Wrestling/WWF show in Montreal. On January 12, 1986 in Toronto he again defeated Savage, this time via disqualification. A day later he was scheduled to face Hulk Hogan in a babyface vs babyface match at a joint WWF/International Wrestling show in Montreal. However the match was cancelled at the last moment due to the WWF's fears that Hogan would be booed; Bravo instead faced and defeated Big John Studd.

At this point Bravo disappeared from WWF rings and resumed competition exclusively within International Wrestling, with the WWF Canadian Championship being abandoned.

==== Alliance with the Dream Team / New Dream Team (1986–1987) ====
Bravo returned to the WWF on the October 18, 1986 episode of Wrestling Challenge, defeating Tony Parks. He debuted a new look, being noticeably more muscular, and almost immediately began bleaching his brown hair blonde and turned on the Rougeau Brothers to become a heel. He began working as part of "Luscious" Johnny Valiant's stable with the Dream Team (Greg Valentine and Brutus Beefcake). He remained undefeated as the fall progressed and began teaming with the Dream Team in six man matches. On November 19, 1986, the trio wrestled Billy Jack Haynes and the Rougeau Brothers to a double disqualification on a match taped for WWF Superstars of Wrestling. The following day they defeated Sivi Afi and the Islanders in a match recorded for Wrestling Challenge. Bravo then entered his first program on the house show circuit, defeating Dick Slater in numerous encounters. On November 26 in Houston, Texas he suffered his first loss, falling to Slater. He closed out 1986 with a disqualification loss to former WWF Champion Pedro Morales in Providence, Rhode Island. In early 1987, Bravo became embroiled in a house show series with Billy Jack Haynes as the year commenced and this time began the first losing streak of his WWF run, losing multiple matches.

At WrestleMania III, Brutus Beefcake was kicked out of the stable, with Bravo forming the New Dream Team with Valentine. The New Dream Team began a feud with the Rougeau Brothers and were initially victorious in house show encounters. They finally sustained their first loss when the Rougeaus defeated them on the June 17, 1987 edition of Prime Time Wrestling. As the summer, began the New Dream Team and manager Johnny V faced the Rougeaus and Brutus Beefcake in multiple encounters.

The New Dream Team entered a tournament on July 19, 1987 in Buffalo, New York to earn a championship opportunity against WWF Tag Team Champions the Hart Foundation. The New Dream defeated Demolition via countout in the first round, then beat Rick Martel and George "the Animal" Steele in the semi-finals. After defeating the British Bulldogs in the finals to earn the title shot, they were victorious over the Hart Foundation, albeit by disqualification. A day later in Hershey, Pennsylvania another tag team tournament was held, and again the New Dream Team won. Once more they defeated The Hart Foundation, but as the win was again via disqualification the belts did not change hands.

The New Dream Team continued to feud against the Rougeau Brothers and by the fall of 1987 had gained the upper hand in a majority of their encounters. They then began a program with the rising team of the Young Stallions. After gaining initial victories, the New Dream Team was upset on September 18, 1987 in Chicago, Illinois. Bravo and Valentine defeated the Young Stallions on Prime Time Wrestling on October 1. On the November 8, 1987 of Wrestling Challenge they suffered another setback, this time losing to the British Bulldogs via disqualification. At the inaugural Survivor Series on November 26, the New Dream Team was part of a ten man tag team match but lost after the Young Stallions eliminated them.

==== "World's Strongest Man" (1987–1989) ====
Bravo returned to singles competition after a few months and began a strongman gimmick. In his days of wrestling mostly in Canada, Bravo was known as more of a technical wrestler, but with his strongman gimmick his technical side was pushed into the background and his style changed to using power (brawling) moves such as body slams, clotheslines, punches and kicks, and other power holds such as the bearhug, while his finishing move changed from an airplane spin to a sidewalk slam.

At the 1988 Royal Rumble, Bravo (who was legitimately strong and was said to be able to press more than 500 pounds) attempted to bench press what he claimed was 715 pounds, which would have been a world record at that time. Commentator (and former bodybuilder) Jesse "the Body" Ventura helped lift the bar at one point, but Bravo played the lift as a success and began billing himself as the "World's Strongest Man". Later that night he participated in the Royal Rumble match, making it to the final three before being eliminated by Jim Duggan.

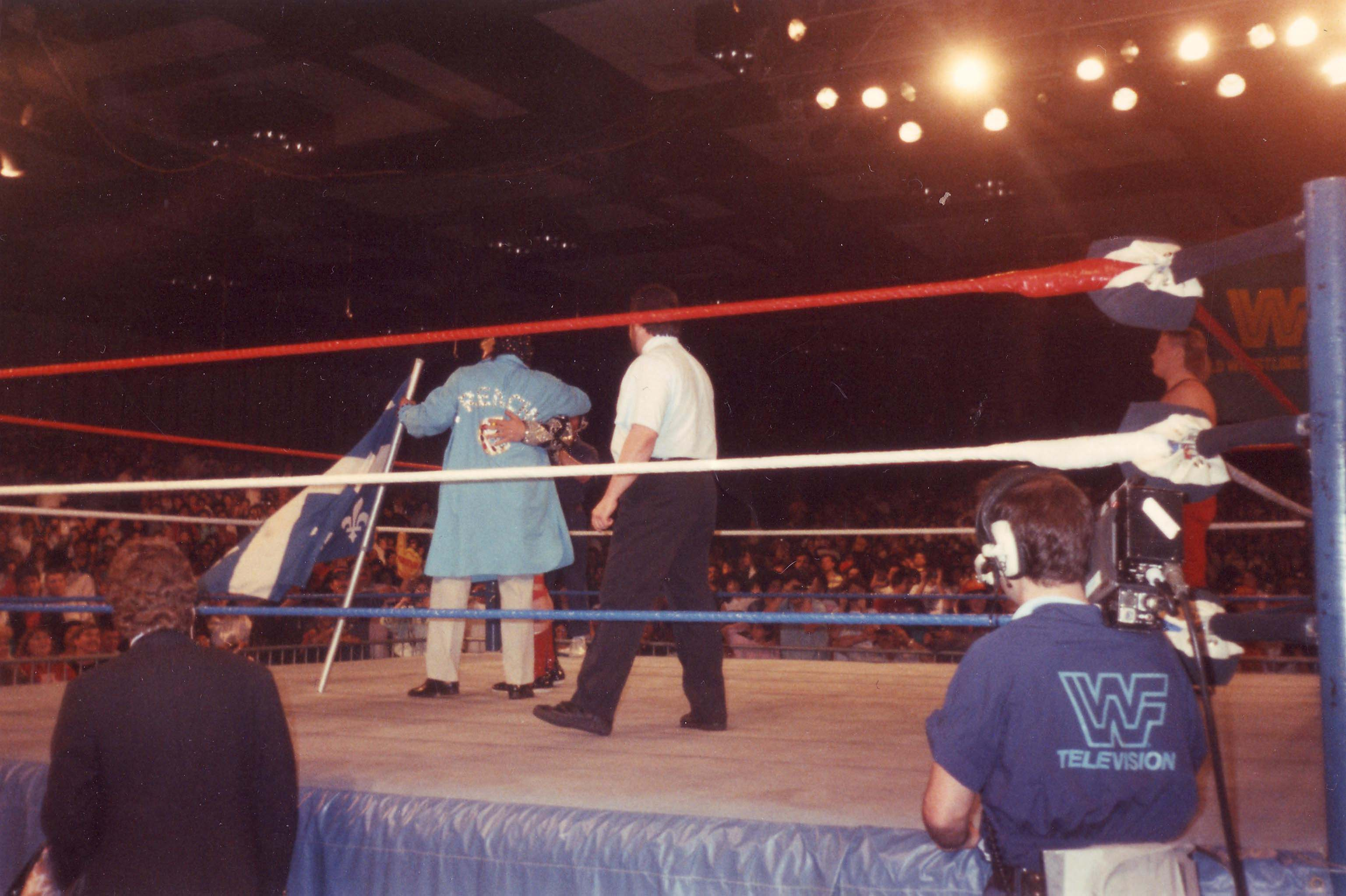
Dino Bravo (only partially visible) in March 1989, being hugged by manager Frenchy Martin

Under his new gimmick, Bravo was initially unbeaten and faced various competitors like Hillbilly Jim, Koko B. Ware, Ken Patera, David Sammartino, and The Junkyard Dog. He also went to numerous time limit draws with Ricky Steamboat and Jake "the Snake" Roberts. He played up his Québécois identity by wearing the Fleur-de-lis. After manager Johnny V left the WWF, Bravo took on Frenchy Martin as his new manager; Martin often toted around a sign reading USA is not OK.

In March 1988, Bravo was eliminated in the first round of the WWF Championship tournament at WrestleMania IV against Don Muraco after pulling the referee between himself and Muraco. Before the match, to further play on Bravo's "world's strongest man" claim, Jesse Ventura in commentary claimed that during Bravo's "record" lift of 715 pounds, he had only used his "two little pinkies" and had only put two pounds of pressure on the bar.

Following WrestleMania IV, Bravo began a feud with Ken Patera and engaged in a series of arm wrestling contents in various house show matches. On the May 21, 1988 episode of Wrestling Challenge he faced Patera in a tug-of-war contest. Patera defeated Bravo via disqualification after Bravo attacked him with the rope. Their house show series then continued with Bravo coming out victorious, On the May 30th episode of Prime Time Wrestling, Bravo pinned Patera.

Dino Bravo achieved the biggest win of his WWF run to that point on July 29, 1988 when he pinned Ultimate Warrior using the ropes for leverage in Montreal, Quebec. He continued his feud with Patera throughout the summer and gained another televised victory over the former Olympian, defeating him on the August 22, 1988 episode of Prime Time Wrestling. On August 28, 1988, he defeated WWF World Heavyweight Champion Randy Savage yet again in Montreal, this time via countout.

Bravo faced Don Muraco in a rematch from WrestleMania IV at the inaugural SummerSlam at Madison Square Garden in August 1988; Martin distracted Bravo's opponent Muraco to allow Bravo to get the victory (Muraco's usual manager "Superstar" Billy Graham was doing commentary for the event alongside Gorilla Monsoon, as Ventura was assigned as the guest referee for the main event; thus, Graham, who was not at ringside, could only look on in frustration at Bravo and Martin's illegal tactics). On October 9 Bravo earned a rematch with Randy Savage in Montreal; this time the two wrestlers battled to a double disqualification.

On the October 15, 1988 episode of WWF Superstars, Bravo and Frenchy Martin interrupted Jim Duggan on The Brother Love Show, beginning a new feud. The next day at King of the Ring, Bravo lost to Jim Duggan in a flag match. Unlike his encounters with Ken Patera, Bravo was defeated by the American wrestler multiple times and endured the first losing streak of his WWF career. On the November 22 edition of Prime Time Wrestling, he gained a measure of revenge and defeated Duggan by countout. At the 1988 Survivor Series on November 22, Bravo teamed with Andre the Giant, Curt Hennig, Harley Race, and Rick Rude to defeat the team of Jake Roberts, Ken Patera, Scott Casey, and Tito Santana. During the match Bravo eliminated Scott Casey.

On the December 12, 1988 edition of Prime Time Wrestling, Bravo lost to Jim Duggan. He continued to feud with Duggan through the end of the year. Bravo opened the year with his feud with Duggan progressing to a series of flag matches at house shows with both wrestlers trading wins. Duggan gained another televised win over Bravo, pinning him on the January 30, 1989 edition of Prime Time Wrestling. At the 1989 Royal Rumble in January 1989, Bravo, accompanied by Martin, teamed with the Fabulous Rougeau Brothers to lose a two out of three falls match to Jim Duggan and the Hart Foundation.

On February 26, 1989, Bravo wrestled Brutus Beefcake to a double countout on WWF Superstars; The Barber cut Frenchy Martin's hair after the match. Following an injury, Hillbilly Jim substituted for Jim Duggan and was equally successful, defeating the Canadian Strongman in multiple flag matches. Three years after their cancelled match, on March 10 Bravo finally had the opportunity to face Hulk Hogan in Montreal and was pinned. He then moved on to teaming with fellow Canadians the Fabulous Rougeau Brothers in a series of trios matches against Jim Duggan and the Bushwhackers.

At WrestleMania V, Bravo defeated fellow Canadian "Rugged" Ronnie Garvin. After the match Martin attacked Garvin, and as a result, Garvin performed his signature maneuver, the "Garvin Stomp" on him. Following WrestleMania V, Bravo replaced Martin in favor of Jimmy Hart in April 1989. He then moved on to a feud with Hercules Hernandez. Unlike his series with Duggan, Bravo was victorious in his encounters with Hercules. The feud continued into the summer, with Bravo victorious in every encounter until referee Ronnie Garvin reversed a decision on June 24, 1989 in Orlando, Florida. Bravo began taunting Ronnie Garvin in televised matches that the latter was refereeing.

==== Alliance with Earthquake (1989–1991) ====
On the July 3, 1989 edition of WWF Superstars, Bravo reformed the New Dream Team with Greg Valentine, losing to the Rockers. The two began teaming on the house show circuit, facing the Hart Foundation in a series of unsuccessful encounters. On the August 21st edition of Prime Time Wrestling, Bravo teamed with fellow Jimmy Hart charge The Honky Tonk Man to defeat the Hart Foundation via disqualification. At SummerSlam on August 28, 1989 Bravo defeated Koko B. Ware in a dark match. Having been reinstated as a wrestler, Ronnie Garvin continued his feud with both Greg Valentine and Dino Bravo in the fall of 1989. Garvin defeated Bravo on the September 18 episode of Prime Time Wrestling via disqualification after The Hammer interfered. Meanwhile, Valentine and Bravo split off into singles competition on the house show circuit, with Valentine facing Garvin and Bravo engaging in a lengthy series of victories over Jim Neidhart.

Jimmy Hart's stable of the Rougeau Brothers, Bravo, and Valentine was bolstered by the arrival of John Tenta on the November 11, 1989, edition of WWF Superstars of Wrestling. Tenta was planted in the audience as a normal spectator at the taping held in Wheeling, West Virginia. During an in-ring interview with Gene Okerlund, Dino Bravo challenged Ultimate Warrior to a strength competition. In order to demonstrate, Bravo and manager Jimmy Hart suggested that they pick a random audience member to come into the ring and sit on the backs of Bravo and the Ultimate Warrior as they did push-ups to see who could do the most. The Ultimate Warrior agreed, and Hart, after pretending to look around the audience, centered his attention on the very large Tenta who was sitting in the audience in casual clothing and appearing surprised. Tenta came down into the ring, identified himself as "John from West Virginia" and proceeded to sit on Bravo's back as he did a set of push-ups. During the Ultimate Warrior's set, however, Tenta leapt down onto the prone Ultimate Warrior using a seated senton. Bravo and Tenta then beat and unleashed multiple big splashes on the prone Warrior. Both then celebrated as Tenta was inaugurated into the WWF as a heel with Hart as his manager. Bravo would often display his strength by doing push-ups while the 460 lb. Earthquake sat on his back (although Tenta kept his feet on the floor, so not all of his weight was on his partner).

On November 23 at the 1989 Survivor Series, Bravo teamed with stablemates Greg Valentine and Earthquake and Randy Savage as "The King's Court" to defeat Jim Duggan, Bret Hart, Ronnie Garvin, and Hercules, with Bravo eliminating Garvin during the match. In December he began a house show series with WWF Intercontinental Champion Ultimate Warrior, but was unable to win the title. The house show series with Ultimate Warrior quickly turned into an outright feud with Jimmy Hart's stable. Bravo participated in the 1990 Royal Rumble and was eliminated by Ultimate Warrior. Bravo vowed that Warrior's scheduled title versus title match at WrestleMania VI would not feature the Intercontinental title, as he declared he would be champion by the time of the PPV. However, at The Main Event III in Detroit, Michigan, Ultimate Warrior cleanly pinned him. After the match Earthquake attacked Warrior, leading WWF World Heavyweight Champion Hulk Hogan to come down and make the rescue. Bravo then received a shot at WWF Champion Hulk Hogan on the March 10, 1990 episode of WWF Superstars. Hogan defeated Bravo and was in turn attacked by Earthquake, leading Warrior to come down to the ring and make the save.

On April 1, 1990 at WrestleMania VI, Bravo lost to Jim Duggan. After the match, Earthquake entered the ring and attacked Duggan. Bravo then entered the tournament to crown a new Intercontinental champion after Ultimate Warrior vacated the title following WrestleMania, and on May 12, 1990 faced Brutus Beefcake in the quarterfinals. The two wrestlers battled to a double countout, eliminating both. Bravo then entered a brief feud with Red Rooster, defeating him in a series on house show matches and on the May 21st episode of Prime Time Wrestling.

The team of Earthquake and Bravo would go on to have a lengthy feud with Hulk Hogan and Tugboat following Earthquake's attack on Hogan on the Brother Love show. On the June 17th episode of WWF Superstars he vowed to end Tugboat's career as his partner Earthquake had supposedly concluded Hogan's. He entered a house show series with Tugboat as the summer progressed but was unsuccessful, falling to Hogan's protégé on numerous occasions. After a month of consecutive defeats Bravo finally gained a measure of revenge and pinned Tugboat on July 7, 1990 in Calgary, Alberta after Jimmy Hart put his feet on the ropes. With Hulk Hogan still recovering, long-time Bravo foe Jim Duggan joined forces with Tugboat to face Earthquake and Dino in a house show series in July and August. Hulk Hogan finally returned in August 1990 and Bravo was the recipient of a series of matches; Hogan won each encounter. On the August 18 edition of WWF Superstars, Tugboat faced Bob Bradley. Bravo interfered shortly after the match began, causing a disqualification. Earthquake then joined the attack and the two left Tugboat to be taken out on a stretcher. Tugboat was thus removed as Hogan's cornerman for their upcoming SummerSlam main event and was replaced by Big Boss Man. Bravo served as Earthquake's corner man at the 1990 SummerSlam on August 27 in Philadelphia, Pennsylvania but did not get involved in the match. Bravo and Earthquake continued to feud with Hogan and Tugboat in the fall. On the October 8 edition of WWF Superstars he defeated Nikolai Volkoff via disqualification after Tugboat interfered. On the November 5 edition of Prime Time Wrestling he returned the favor, interfering in Tugboat's match with Earthquake and causing a disqualification of his own. On November 22 at the 1990 Survivor Series, the "Natural Disasters" (Bravo, Earthquake, Haku, and The Barbarian) lost to the "Hulkamaniacs" (Hulk Hogan, Tugboat, Big Boss Man, and Jim Duggan). Bravo was eliminated during the match by Hulk Hogan and his team went on to lose the match. The feud continued through the end of 1990 with Bravo often interfering in Hogan's matches with Earthquake, causing the former WWF Champion to lose on multiple occasions by count out.

On January 7, 1991, Bravo faced Davey Boy Smith at a WWF Superstars taping in Huntsville, Alabama. After Smith pinned Bravo, manager Jimmy Hart accidentally hit Greg Valentine, leading Valentine to attack both Hart and Bravo. Bravo participated in the 1991 Royal Rumble on January 19 in Miami, Florida and was the first man eliminated, being tossed over the top rope by the now babyface Greg Valentine. On January 28 in Macon, Georgia, Bravo and Earthquake teamed up to face Hulk Hogan and Tugboat at The Main Event V, and were defeated. Next, Bravo faced Valentine on the February 24 edition of Prime Time Wrestling in a match between the two former New Dream Team partners; Valentine won via disqualification after Earthquake interfered.

Bravo moved on to a house show series against fellow power wrestler Davey Boy Smith and lost in every encounter in February. As March began he faced Tito Santana, Big Bossman, Greg Valentine, and Jim Duggan in various house show matches and was defeated in all. Now riding a lengthy losing streak entering WrestleMania VII, Bravo lost to Kerry Von Erich at the pay-per-view. After losing to Greg Valentine on the April 2nd edition of Prime Time Wrestling, Bravo took a three-month sabbatical from the WWF.

==== Final appearances (1991–1992) ====
Bravo returned to action with the WWF at a house show on June 22, 1991 in Boston, Massachusetts. Substituting for Hercules, he lost to Kerry Von Erich. He returned to television on July 1 at a Prime Time Wrestling taping and finally ended his losing streak by pinning Shane Douglas in a match recorded in Madison Square Garden.

On July 9 at an episode of WWF Superstars recorded in Alberta, Bravo appeared without his dyed blond hair and interrupted fellow Jimmy Hart stablemate The Mountie and struck him to turn babyface. His next appearance on WWF TV came on August 5, 1991 (at the Alberta taping) as a babyface (without Jimmy Hart or dyed-blonde hair), now being billed as the "Canadian Strongman, Dino Bravo" in victories over Louie Spicolli and Shane Douglas (who had also defeated Bravo on January 3, 1991, at a house show in Scranton, Pennsylvania). Bravo then began a short run on Montreal house shows as a face and defeated The Mountie on October 27, 1991.

While still on the WWF roster, Bravo traveled to Capitol Sports Promotions and made his debut on September 27, 1991. Teaming with Fidel Sierra he lost to Carlos Colon and Invader #1. On November 2, 1991 he faced Colon for the vacant WWC Universal Heavyweight Championship, losing to the veteran wrestler.

On January 20, 1992, Bravo defeated The Barbarian in Montreal, Quebec in a match that was billed as Bravo's retirement match. However Bravo's retirement was not permanent; he returned to action on a WWF European tour in April 1992. On April 11, 1992 he faced long-time foe Jim Duggan in a match in Milan, Italy and was defeated. On April 14, he unsuccessfully challenged Bret Hart for the Intercontinental Championship in Munich, Germany (the match aired on Prime Time Wrestling on June 1). As the European tour continued, he faced Tito Santana in multiple bouts. His final WWF match was televised on Sky Movies, and came at Rampage where he teamed with The Iron Sheik in a match against the Legion of Doom in Sheffield, England.

=== New England Wrestling Federation (1992) ===
After leaving the WWF, Bravo wrestled a final time. His last match was on May 17, 1992, when he defeated Richard Charland in Barre, Vermont for the New England Wrestling Federation. After retiring, he helped train wrestlers in Montreal.

== Final years and death ==
Bresciano retired from wrestling in 1992 and afterwards headed two sporting goods companies, Dino Bravo Inc. and Titan. In later life, he was known to have links to organized crime in Quebec. Bresciano was a nephew by marriage of Montreal crime boss Vincenzo Cotroni, himself a former wrestler, and was believed by authorities to be involved in Cotroni's organization for some time. He allegedly worked as an enforcer and debt collector for the Cotroni family. Bresciano worked with Gino Brito in security agencies specializing in resolving labor disputes and had a minor criminal record between 1972 and 1986, for violence, weapon possession and auto theft. Rick Martel claimed in a 2007 shoot interview that Bresciano confided in him about his involvement in illegal cigarette smuggling, having leveraged his celebrity status to monopolize smuggling via Indian reserves, and was trying to expand into cocaine trafficking, which likely led to his death.

=== Death ===
On March 10, 1993, Bresciano was found shot dead at the age of 44 in an apparent gangland killing at his home in the upscale Vimont neighborhood of Laval, Quebec. Bresciano's body was discovered by his wife when she returned home, finding him dead in an armchair in the living room of the house. He was hit by 11 bullets in the head and torso. Seventeen bullet casings from two different firearms (.22 and .380 calibres) were found on the living room floor. As there were no signs of a struggle or forced entry, and two weapons (a pistol and a machine gun) were left at the scene, police theorized that Bresciano was shot by two gunmen who he had either let into the home or who had entered through an unlocked door. A sum of CAD$55,000 and a container of contraband cigarettes was also found at the home, leading police to believe that Besciano's murder was connected to the theft of a CAD$50,000 cigarette consignment which was stolen in a truck hijacking. Bresciano had reportedly received death threats prior to his murder. According to former opponent Bret Hart, Bresciano confided to friends shortly before his death that he knew his days were numbered.

At the time of his death, Bresciano was the father of a six-year-old daughter with his wife, Diane Rivest. Bresciano's murder has gone unsolved but remains an open case as of 2020. His death was the subject of the sixth episode in the second season of the wrestling documentary series Dark Side of the Ring, airing on April 21, 2020. In the documentary, longtime Montreal crime reporter Claude Poirier theorized that Bresciano was targeted after a cigarette shipment worth CAD$400,000 was seized by the Royal Canadian Mounted Police (RCMP) during a raid on a warehouse on the South Shore of Montreal. He also asserted that Bresciano had been known to the Sûreté du Québec as an organized crime figure at the time.

== Championships and accomplishments ==
- Grand Prix Wrestling (Montreal)
  - Grand Prix Tag Team Championship (2 times) - with Gino Brito
- Lutte Internationale
  - Canadian International Heavyweight Championship (6 times)
  - Canadian International Tag Team Championship (1 time) – with Tony Parisi
- Maple Leaf Wrestling
  - NWA Canadian Heavyweight Championship (Toronto version) (2 times)
- Mid-Atlantic Championship Wrestling
  - NWA Mid-Atlantic Tag Team Championship (3 times) – with Mr. Wrestling (1), Tiger Conway Jr. (1) and Ricky Steamboat (1)
  - NWA World Tag Team Championship (Mid-Atlantic version) (1 time) – with Mr. Wrestling
- NWA Hollywood Wrestling
  - NWA Americas Heavyweight Championship (1 time)
  - NWA Americas Tag Team Championship (1 time) – with Victor Rivera
- Pro Wrestling Illustrated
  - PWI Most Improved Wrestler of the Year (1978)
  - Ranked No. 47 of the top 500 singles wrestlers in the PWI 500 in 1991
- World Wide Wrestling Federation / World Wrestling Federation
  - WWF Canadian Championship (1 time, inaugural and final)
  - WWWF World Tag Team Championship (1 time) – with Dominic DeNucci

== See also ==
- List of premature professional wrestling deaths
- List of unsolved murders (1980–1999)
