= Rick McGraw =

American professional wrestler (1955-1985)

Personal information
- Born: Richard Emmett McGraw Jr. March 19, 1955 Charlotte, North Carolina, U.S.
- Died: November 1, 1985 (aged 30) Fair Haven East, Connecticut, U.S.
- Cause of death: Heart attack
- Spouse: Lisa

Professional wrestling career
- Ring name: Rick McGraw
- Billed height: 5 ft 7 in (1.70 m)
- Billed weight: 235 lb (107 kg)
- Billed from: Charlotte, North Carolina
- Trained by: Rip Hawk; Bill Watts; Pat O'Connor
- Debut: 1975

Richard Emmett McGraw Jr. (March 19, 1955 – November 1, 1985) was an American professional wrestler, best known for his appearances with the World Wrestling Federation (WWF) under the ring name "Quickdraw" Rick McGraw from 1980 until his death in 1985. He also wrestled for the World Wrestling Association (WWA), where he won the WWA World Tag Team Championship with The Dream Machine as The New York Dolls, and Southeastern Championship Wrestling (SECW), where he won the NWA Alabama Heavyweight Championship.

== Early life ==
Richard Emmett McGraw Jr. was born in Charlotte, North Carolina, on March 15, 1955. He graduated from North Mecklenburg High School in 1973, where he was a state wrestling champion in the 185-pound division and chosen as his school's athlete of the year. He also played football as an All-County linebacker and running back. McGraw then attended Elon College, where he also wrestled and played football.

== Professional wrestling career ==
McGraw made his professional wrestling debut in 1975 in Florida after training under Rip Hawk, who knew him at a young age, at the gym in the basement of Hawk's house. That same year, he made his debut for Jim Crockett Promotions (JCP), working there until 1977. He returned to North Mecklenburg High School in 1979 to serve as an assistant wrestling coach.

In May 1980, McGraw made his debut for the World Wrestling Federation (WWF) as a face. On August 9, he took part in the Showdown at Shea event, losing to Greg Gagne. He defeated enhancement talent, but mostly lost to heels who were ready to challenge WWF Champion Bob Backlund. In April 1981, McGraw appeared for New Japan Pro-Wrestling (NJPW) as part of the "NJPW WWF Big Fight Series II" tour, often teaming with Ken Patera, Backlund, Tiger Jeet Singh and Dynamite Kid against the likes of Antonio Inoki, Tatsumi Fujinami, Seiji Sakaguchi and Riki Choshu. Two months later, McGraw was involved in an angle where his neck was "broken" by Killer Khan in a match, sidelining him for six to nine weeks. In the interim, he wrestled for Promotions Varoussac, where he and Gino Brito defeated Swede Hanson and Le Bourreau to win the Canadian International Tag Team Championship on November 9. They lost the titles on December 30 to Gilles Poisson and Sailor White. McGraw returned in January 1982 with Arnold Skaaland as his manager, and formed a tag team with Steve Travis the following month. They were known as the "Carolina Connection" due to both men being from the Carolinas and having similar backgrounds playing football in college. At the same time, he teamed with André the Giant, and both teams unsuccessfully challenged Mr. Fuji and Mr. Saito for the WWF Tag Team Championship. McGraw left the WWF in July and briefly returned to NJPW that month as part of the "Summer Fight Series II" tour.

On September 6, McGraw debuted for the World Wrestling Association (WWA), where he and Giant Kimala challenged Spike Huber and Steve Regal for the WWA World Tag Team Championship, but lost the match via disqualification. Shortly after, he formed a heel tag team with The Dream Machine known as The New York Dolls, incorporating tuxedos and bow ties as part of their ring gear and Jimmy Hart as their manager. They were brought to Memphis to feud with the Fabulous Ones (Stan Lane and Steve Keirn). On September 25, they defeated Huber and Regal to win the WWA World Tag Team Championship. However, they lost the titles in a rematch in December. In 1984, he began appearing for Southeastern Championship Wrestling (SECW), winning the NWA Alabama Heavyweight Championship from Vic Rain on May 28. He lost the title in August to Boris Zhukov. Later that month, McGraw returned to the WWF full-time.

On the October 26, 1985 episode of WWF Championship Wrestling, McGraw was a guest on Roddy Piper's "Piper's Pit" segment and got on his case about always shooting his mouth off and not wrestling on television, prompting Piper to accept a challenge to wrestle him on the following week's show, which would be McGraw's final televised appearance. At the start of the match, Piper threw McGraw out of the ring and twice into the guardrail. After no-selling several punches and kicks in McGraw's comeback, Piper hit him with a swinging neckbreaker and two DDTs, the second prompting the referee to stop the match, declaring McGraw unable to continue. Coincidentally, the match aired the day after McGraw's death. Off TV, McGraw faced Mike Sharpe in his final match on October 28.

== Other media ==
McGraw appeared on an episode of The A-Team in 1985 alongside Hulk Hogan, Mr. T, Ricky Steamboat, The British Bulldogs (Davey Boy Smith and Dynamite Kid) and Corporal Kirchner.

== Personal life and death ==
McGraw enjoyed boating, bowling, ice hockey and swimming.

On November 1, 1985, McGraw died of a heart attack at the age of 30. His body was found at his home in New Haven, Connecticut, by friends who grew concerned after being unable to contact him. Fellow professional wrestler Bret Hart noted in his autobiography that McGraw regularly consumed Placidyl and suggested this resulted in his heart failing. He was survived by his wife, Lisa. On December 16, the WWF held an event to benefit McGraw's family, which was headlined by Roddy Piper.

== Championships and accomplishments ==
- Continental Championship Wrestling
  - NWA Alabama Heavyweight Championship (1 time)
- Lutte Internationale
  - Canadian International Tag Team Championship (1 time) – with Gino Brito
- Pro Wrestling Illustrated
  - Ranked #485 of the top 500 singles wrestlers of the "PWI Years" in 2003
- World Wrestling Association
  - WWA World Tag Team Championship (1 time) – with Troy Graham

== See also ==
- List of premature professional wrestling deaths
