= Eddie Creatchman =

Canadian professional wrestling manager

Eddie (Eddy) Creatchman

Personal information
- Born: February 27, 1928 Montreal, Canada
- Died: March 9, 1994 (aged 66)

Professional wrestling career
- Ring name(s): The Brain; The Boss
- Debut: circa late 1940s
- Retired: 1980s

Eddie Creatchman (February 27, 1928 – March 9, 1994) was a Canadian professional wrestling manager. He was known as Eddie "The Brain" Creatchman, manager of wrestlers such as The Sheik and Steve Strong.

== Professional wrestling career ==
Creatchman began his professional wrestling career in the late 1940s. He was first a wrestler, then a referee and later became a wrestling manager.

As a manager, Creatchman's character was known for wearing sunglasses, smoking a cigar, and wearing a Star of David. Creatchman helped promote his wrestlers who could not handle themselves in interviews. He is best known for his time on the Quebec independent wrestling circuit, where he managed The Sheik and Abdullah the Butcher. While managing The Sheik in 1970, he caused a riot at the Montreal Forum, and as a result, an impressed Sheik brought Creatchman to Detroit to continue managing him.

In the 1980s, Creatchman served as the manager for Steve Strong in Montreal-based International Wrestling as Strong brawled with the likes of Abdullah the Butcher and Rick Martel. Also in the 1980s, he managed Sheik Ali.

Creatchman and his son Floyd owned International Wrestling from 1986 to 1987.

== Personal life ==
Aside from wrestling, Creatchman owned a scrap metal business, which he ran with his wife Goldie, who he married in 1949, she died in 1985. His son Floyd Creatchman, who also became a manager, died in 2003 from Crohn's disease. He is survived by daughter Cheryl and grandchildren Joel & Alissa.

Also in September 2024, 30 years after his death; he was inducted into Wrestling Hall of Fame in Shawinigan.Qc. For FCL promotion in the same night that King Hammer, Réjean Désaulniers, the Reno Brothers, and the Mancuso Brothers were inducted.

== Wrestlers managed ==
- Abdullah the Butcher
- Don Leo Jonathan
- George Cannon
- Gilles Poisson
- Tarzan Tyler
- The Sheik
- Sailor White
- Kamala
- Pierre Lefebvre
- The Sheik Ali
- Richard Charland
- Frenchy Martin
- Steve Strong
- Rick Valentine
- Neil Guay
- Barney Irwin
- Hercules Ayala
- Bruiser Brody
- The Masked Superstar
- Scott Irwin

== See also ==
- List of Jewish professional wrestlers
