= Nelson Veilleux =

Canadian retired professional wrestler (born 1967)

Personal information
- Born: January 5, 1967 (age 59) Montreal, Quebec, Canada

Professional wrestling career
- Ring name(s): Nelson Veilleux; Le Trapper; Brick Crawford; Bob Crawford; Rick Crawford
- Billed height: 5 ft 8 in (1.73 m)
- Billed weight: 246 lb (112 kg; 17.6 st)
- Trained by: Édouard Carpentier; Frenchy Martin
- Debut: 1985
- Retired: 2008

Nelson Veilleux (born January 5, 1967) is a retired Canadian professional wrestler who spent his career in Quebec, New Brunswick, England and the World Wrestling Federation.

== Career ==
Veilleux began his wrestling career in Montreal for Lutte International in 1985. Later that year he worked for the World Wrestling Federation (WWF) when they had shows in Montreal, Toronto, and Brantford, Ontario. Veillex worked for the WWF until 1990 having matches against The Iron Sheik, Nikolai Volkoff, Randy Savage, Bret Hart, Jake Roberts, Harley Race and Mr. Perfect. Later he worked in New York and New England. He also worked for Grand Prix Wrestling in New Brunswick.

From 1991 to 1992 Veilleux worked in England for All-Star Wrestling as Brick Crawford.

He also teamed with Pierre Carl Ouellet in South Africa and Germany.

Veilleux appeared on a house show for World Championship Wrestling in Montreal where he defeated Sunny War Cloud.

Later in his career, Veilleux stayed in Quebec working in the independents such as Northern Championship Wrestling in Montreal. In 2006, Veilleux became a two-time SWR International Champion. During his second reign, he held the title for nearly a year for 363 days. He retired from wrestling in 2008.

== Championships and accomplishments ==
- Showcase Wrestling Revolution
  - SWR International Championship (2 times)
