= Frank Valois =

Canadian professional wrestler (1921 – 1998)

Personal information
- Born: Fernand Levis Valois; December 17, 1921 Montreal, Quebec, Canada
- Died: December 31, 1998 (aged 77) Sainte-Adèle, Quebec, Canada

Professional wrestling career
- Ring name(s): Frank Valois; Masked Marvel; Francois Valois; Gene Valois
- Billed height: 6 ft 2 in (1.88 m)
- Billed weight: 230 lb (100 kg)
- Trained by: Yvon Robert
- Debut: 1940
- Retired: 1978

Fernand Levis Valois (December 17, 1921 – December 31, 1998) was a French Canadian professional wrestler, promoter and actor who was best known to fans in Quebec, United States and Europe as Frank Valois. He was the promoter for Montreal's Lutte Internationale in the 1980s.

== Professional wrestling career ==
Trained by lightweight world champion Eugene Trembley as an amateur, Valois started wrestling in 1940 at the age of 18 in Montreal for promoter Eddie Quinn. He also worked in Quebec City and other towns in Quebec. In 1944, he moved to the United States to work for Boston promoter Paul Bowser.

His career nearly came to a screeching halt in 1945 when a driver ran a red light and hit Valois' car. He survived the accident but it left a scar in his face. Valois continued to wrestle and was described in 1947 as "strictly a scientific grappler who relies upon speed, agility, and aggressiveness to win." He was a good babyface but also excelled as a heel, causing riots and enraging fans by hitting his opponents with his dreaded atomic drop finisher. The legality was challenged and upheld by the NWA in 1954.

He started competing in Europe in 1949, developing a rough and tough style which included him using a cobra hold. Mainly worked in Switzerland. In fact, he was that successful in Europe that he was filming around 20 movies with top French actors. Valois also served as a bodyguard in France for Georges Pompidou and Charles de Gaulle.

In 1952, he left Europe and went to Toronto to work for Maple Leaf Wrestling and also worked in other Ontario towns. In 1953, he worked in Hawaii. Then in 1954 returned to work for Eddie Quinn in Montreal and Ottawa.

On March 10, 1959, Valois and Andre Bollet won the NWA Texas Tag Team Championship defeating Chief Big Heart and Chief Little Eagle, holding the belts for a month until they dropped it back to Chief Big Heart and Chief Little Eagle. He also competed in Japan in 1960 where Valois teamed with Dan Miller and defeated Rikidozan and Michiaki Yoshimura to win the All Asia Tag Team Championship in a tournament final. They only held the titles for five days dropping it to Rikidozan and Toyonobori.

Throughout the 1960s he worked in the United States. From 1963 to 1965 he worked in Florida and the Mid-Atlantic. Valois returned to Europe in 1965 working in France. In 1966, Valois met Andre Roussimoff who was known as Andre the Giant, and years later, notably became his business manager and advisor. He occasionally wrestled on the undercard of shows where Andre was working as a headliner in the 1970s. In 1969, he returned to Japan.

In 1972 he made his debut for Montreal's brand new Grand Prix promotion. He lost to Andre the Giant in a match in Pittsburgh in 1973. From 1973 to 1975 he worked for the World Wide Wrestling Federation based in New York City.

Valois retired as a wrestler in 1978.

== Lutte Internationale ==
After retiring from wrestling, Valois in 1980 joined Andre the Giant and Gino Brito and formed Lutte Internationale (French pronunciation: [lyt ɛ̃tɛʁnɑsjɔnal]; "International Wrestling") also known as Promotions Varoussac (VAlois, ROUSSimoff, and ACcocella Promotions) the latter made up of the first letters of their family names. Lutte Internationale succeeded All-Star Wrestling and Grand Prix Wrestling as Quebec's top wrestling promotion for most of the 1980s. Andre's manager Frank Valois had the necessary business experience to run a wrestling company. Valois retired as a promoter in 1986 a year before the promotion went bankrupt in June 1987.

== Personal life ==
Valois passed away on New Year's Eve 1998 at 77. He was posthumously inducted into the Quebec Hall of Fame in 2010.

== Championships and accomplishments ==
- Southwest Sports, Inc. / Big Time Wrestling
  - NWA Texas Tag Team Championship (1 time) - with Andre Bollet (1)
- Japan Wrestling Association
  - All Asia Tag Team Championship (1 time) - with Dan Miller
- Quebec Pro Wrestling Hall of Fame
  - Class of 2010
