= WWF Canadian Championship =

Wrestling competition

Details
- Promotion: World Wrestling Federation
- Date established: August 18, 1985
- Date retired: January 22, 1986
Statistics
- First champion(s): Dino Bravo
- Final champion(s): Dino Bravo

In August 1985, the World Wrestling Federation took over the Montreal-based International Wrestling (Lutte Internationale) promotion. Upon joining the WWF roster, IW mainstay Dino Bravo was billed as the WWF Canadian Champion in some Canadian cities until January 1986, when the title was abandoned.

== Reigns ==
Key
No.	Overall reign number
Reign	Reign number for the specific champion
Days	Number of days held

No.	Champion	Championship change			Reign statistics		Notes	Ref.
No.	Champion	Date	Event	Location	Reign	Days	Notes	Ref.
1	Dino Bravo	August 18, 1985	House show	Montreal, Quebec, Canada	1	157 (approx)		
—	Deactivated	January 22, 1986	—	—	—	—	Title abandoned after Bravo left the WWF.	

== See also ==
- Professional wrestling in Canada
