= Gilles Poisson =

Canadian wrestler (born 1947)

Personal information
- Born: 1946 (age 79–80) Lac St-Jean, Quebec, Canada

Professional wrestling career
- Ring name(s): Gilles Poisson; Pierre Poisson; Louis Cyr; Alex the Butcher
- Billed height: 6 ft 1 in (1.85 m)
- Billed weight: 285 lb (129 kg)
- Debut: 1970
- Retired: 1987

Gilles Poisson (born 1946) is a Canadian retired professional wrestler, known by his ring name Pierre or Gilles "The Fish" Poisson, who competed in North American regional promotions including the American Wrestling Association, International Wrestling, Grand Prix Wrestling, Maple Leaf Wrestling, Pacific Northwest Wrestling and Stampede Wrestling during the 1970s and 1980s.

With manager "Classie" Freddie Blassie, he also had a brief stint as Louis Cyr in the World Wide Wrestling Federation. During his time in the WWWF, he feuded with Dominic DeNucci, "Irish" Pat Barrett and WWWF World Tag Team Champions Tony Parisi and Louis Cerdan throughout 1976.

Some websites refer to him as Charles Berger, but as he mentioned in an interview for SLAM! Wrestling, he doesn't know where that originated.

== Career ==
=== Early career ===
Making his professional debut in 1970, Poisson wrestled in Quebec and the Maritimes during his early career and also made an appearance in Stampede Wrestling as Alex the Butcher losing to Billy Robinson at the Exhibition Auditorium in Regina, Saskatchewan on January 15, 1970.

A mainstay of Atlantic Grand Prix Wrestling, he held the Grand Prix Tag Team Championship with Killer Kowalski before eventually losing the titles to Dino Bravo and Gino Brito in Verdun, Quebec on November 20, 1972.

One of the top "heels" in the Montreal-area during the 1970s, an estimated 29,000 were in attendance when he and André the Giant fought to a no contest at the 1973 Grand Prix Wrestling Stadium Show at Jarry Park in July 1973.

Returning to Stampede Wrestling during the mid-1970s, he defeated John Quinn in a 2-out-of-3 falls match in Calgary, Alberta on January 9 to win a title shot against Stampede North American Heavyweight Champion Frankie Laine. He would also defeat Quinn in a rematch the following night in Edmonton, Alberta.

On January 16, he defeated Frankie Laine in a 2–3 falls match for the Stampede North American Heavyweight Championship in Calgary. Although losing to Laine by disqualification twice during the next week, he held the title for eight days before finally losing back to Laine in Edmonton on January 24.

=== World Wide Wrestling Federation ===
Later that month, Poisson would appear in the World Wide Wrestling Federation as Louis Cyr defeating Mike Paidousis at the Zembo Mosque in Harrisburg, Pennsylvania on January 30, 1976. The following month, defeating Francisco Flores at Madison Square Garden on February 2, he also scored victories over Kevin Sullivan and Francisco Flores before fighting to a time limit draw against Dominic DeNucci in Hamburg, Pennsylvania on February 18.

On February 25, he and Crusher Blackwell lost a 2-of-3 falls match to Dominic DeNucci and André the Giant at the Westchester Civic Center in White Plains, New York. He would also team with Crusher Blackwell and Baron Mikel Scicluna in a 6-man tag team match losing to Bobo Brazil, Tony Parisi and Louis Cerdan in a 3-of-5 falls match on February 27. Briefly feuding with "Irish" Pat Barrett, he would later face Pat McGuinness, Dominic DeNucci and Louis Cerdan whom he later fought to a double disqualification at Seton Hall University in South Orange, New Jersey on March 8. Three days later, he would team with Tony Altomare against the WWWF World Tag Team Champions Tony Parisi and Louis Cerdan losing to them at the Sunnyside Gardens in Queens, New York.

While in Bangor, Maine on March 17, Poisson would defeat Pat McGuinness as well as Man Mountain Mike later that night, defeating the heavyweight by countout. Making another attempt to capture the WWWF World Tag Team Championship with Jerry Blackwell, the two lost to Tony Parisi and Louis Cerdan in Landover, Maryland on March 22. Fighting to a time-limit draw against Pat Barrett on March 26, he lost to Bobo Brazil several days later at Madison Square Garden. Continuing to feud with Dominic DeNucci, he also faced Louis Cerdan, Ivan Putski and Bobo Brazil during the next several weeks.

He would also take on the WWWF World Tag Team Champions Tony Parisi and Louis Cerdan with Baron Mikel Scicluna, although he and Scicluna lost to them in Florence, New Jersey on May 5. He would also participate in a 20-man battle royal at the Boston Garden on May 8. Eliminated by Bobo Brazil, the battle royal also included Stan Hansen, Jose Gonzalez, Haystacks Calhoun, Ernie Ladd, Superstar Billy Graham, Gorilla Monsoon, Skandor Akbar, Man Mountain Mike, Bobo Brazil, Ivan Putski, Kevin Sullivan, Jerry Blackwell, Baron Mikel Scicluna, The Executioners and WWWF Tag Team Champions Louis Cerdan & Tony Parisi. Poisson would eventually be eliminated by Bobo Brazil.

Before leaving the promotion at the end of the month, he would substitute for Louis Cerdan in one of his last appearances aiding his longtime rival Tony Parisi in defending the WWWF World Tag Team titles against The Executioners in Landover, Maryland on May 24.

=== American Wrestling Association ===
Several months later, Poisson jumped to the American Wrestling Association defeating Buck "Rock n' Roll" Zumhofe in Davenport, Iowa on September 6. Disqualified during a match against Billy Francis in Green Bay, Wisconsin on September 26, he regularly appeared at the Winnipeg Arena defeating Billy Red Cloud and The Iron Sheik before losing to Jim Brunzell on November 18. Feuding with Jim Brunzell and Greg Gagne during the next several months, he and Moose Moroski would lose to Brunzell and Greg Gangne on December 9, 1976.

The following year, he would lose to Billy Francis, Greg Gagne and Jim Brunzell in a 6-man tag team match with Mad Dog Vachon and Baron von Raschke on February 24. He would also lose to Greg Gagne and Jim Brunzell in a tag team match with Moose Morowski on March 2, 1977. He and Morowski would later participate in the $10,000 battle royal later that night.

=== Later career ===
Returning to the Montreal area, he and Serge Dumont later lost to Pat Patterson and Raymond Rougeau in a tournament final for the NWA International Tag Team Championship in Montreal on June 2, 1980. He also teamed with Mad Dog Lefebvre and Le Bourreau during the early 1980s and, in 1982, defeated Gino Brito and Rick McGraw for the NWA International Tag Team titles with Sailor White before losing the titles to Gino Brito and Tony Parisi later that year. Berger would continue wrestling for International Wrestling and remained one of its top stars during the last years of his career.

He had a try-out for the WWF in June 1985. In one of his last matches, he and Man Mountain Moore lost to Mad Dog Vachon and Jos Leduc at the Paul Sauve Centre on Montreal on October 13, 1986.

== Championships and accomplishments ==
- Lutte Internationale
  - Canadian International Tag Team Championship (1 time) with Sailor White
- Pro Wrestling Illustrated
  - PWI ranked him # 326 of the 400 best singles wrestlers of the PWI's WWE Top 400 in 2003
- Stampede Wrestling
  - Stampede North American Heavyweight Championship (2 times)
