= Floyd Creatchman =

Canadian professional wrestling manager

Personal information
- Born: June 25, 1957 Montreal, Quebec, Canada
- Died: October 25, 2003 (aged 46) Montreal, Quebec, Canada
- Family: Eddie Creatchman (father)

Professional wrestling career
- Ring name(s): Floyd Creatchman; Pretty Boy Creatchman; Leslie Floyd Creatchman III
- Debut: 1975
- Retired: 1987

Floyd "Pretty Boy" Creatchman (25 June 1957 – 25 October 2003) was a Canadian professional wrestling manager and sports agent, and the son of Canadian wrestling manager Eddie "The Brain" Creatchman.

== Early life ==
He was born in Montreal, Quebec, Canada, to Goldie Reisler and Eddie Creatchman.

== Wrestling career ==
In the 1970s, Creatchman entered the ring for his first professional wrestling match. He was nicknamed "Le Petit Juif", which translates into English as "The Little Jew", the name was in reference to his father Eddie who was well known for wearing his Star of David necklace. In the late 1970s he followed in his father's footsteps and transitioned into a Wrestling Manager, working in Big Time Wrestling, Tennessee and the US Midwest. His alias was "Leslie Floyd Creatchman III". By the mid 1980s in Montreal's Lutte Internationale, Creatchman preferred to be called a "Sports Agent" rather than a Wrestling Manager. He was also known as a wrestling announcer and commentator. He hosted the Lutte Internationale "Creatchman’s Corner" segment on CFCF-DT, where he interviewed various wrestlers from his office or luxurious Penthouse Apartment. Creatchman and his father were the owners of Lutte Internationale in Montreal from 1986 to 1987.

== Death ==
Creatchman died on October 25, 2003, from Crohn's disease.

== See also ==
- List of Jewish professional wrestlers
