= Abdullah the Butcher =

Canadian professional wrestler (born 1941)

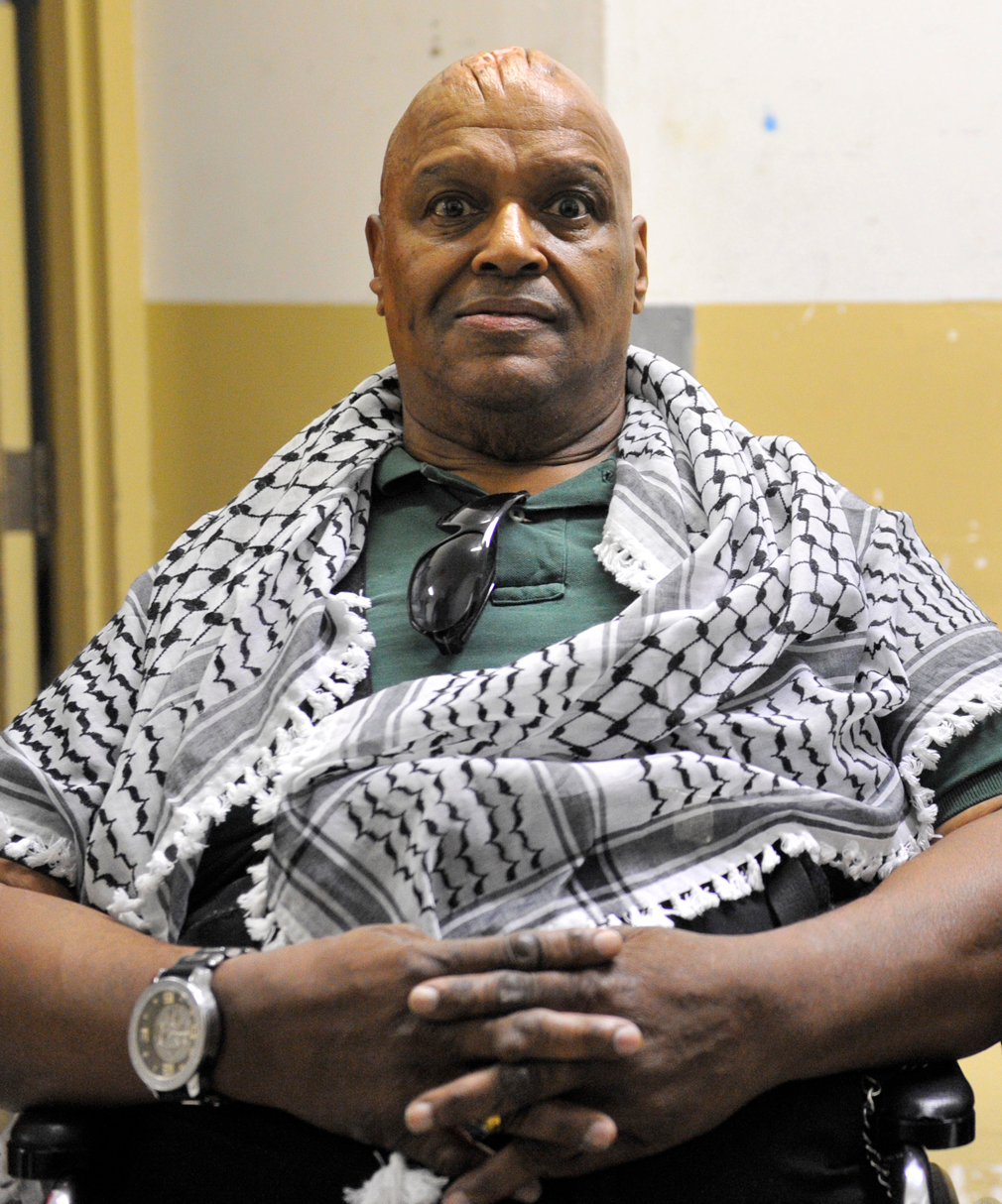
- Abdullah in 2011

Personal information
- Born: Lawrence Robert Shreve; January 11, 1941 (age 85) Windsor, Ontario, Canada

Professional wrestling career
- Ring name(s): Abdullah the Butcher; Kuroi Jujutsushi; Madman from Sudan; Saladin Pikens; Zelis Amara
- Billed height: 6 ft 0 in (183 cm)
- Billed weight: 360 lb (163 kg)
- Billed from: Sudan
- Debut: 1958
- Retired: October 9, 2010

Lawrence Robert Shreve (born January 11, 1941), better known by his ring name Abdullah the Butcher, is a Canadian retired professional wrestler. He has a reputation for being involved in some of the most violent and bloody hardcore wrestling matches of all time. Over his time in wrestling he was given the moniker of "Madman from Sudan".

One of Shreve's trademarks is a series of divot-like scars on his head that he has due to excessive use of blading during his career. The scars are so deep that, according to Mick Foley, Shreve is able to put gambling chips into them. An amateur martial artist, Shreve also has knowledge of judo and karate, often incorporating this knowledge in his wrestling matches through throws and chops.

== Early life ==
Shreve was born on January 11, 1941, and raised in Windsor, Ontario, as part of a family of ten people in a deeply impoverished household. His mother was an African-American from Michigan, and his father was a member of the Native American Blackfoot tribe. He learned karate and judo as a youth and, teaching fellow children in the backyard, claims to have eventually earned the title of seventh-degree grandmaster.

== Professional wrestling career ==
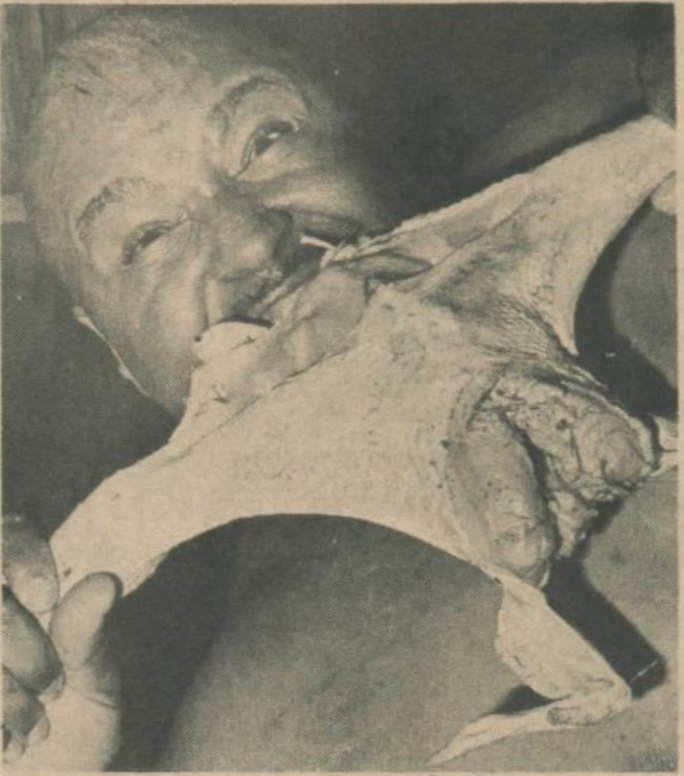
Abdullah the Butcher eating a chicken following a match in 1972

Shreve caught the attention of Montreal promoter Jack Britton, and he started training to be a professional wrestler at age 17 in 1958. He initially competed in numerous independent territories in Canada under various monikers such as Kuroi Jujutsushi (the Black Wizard) and Zelis Amara. Ultimately, he created his gimmick of an evil Arabian sadist, and in a match against Gino Brito (Jack Britton's real-life son), the Abdullah the Butcher character first distinguished himself as one of the world's most feared rule breakers when he broke a chair over Brito's head and then beat him senseless with a chair leg.

Since his gimmick required him to speak no English (though it was his native tongue), he had a number of managers over the course of his long career, including Gary Hart, Paul Jones, Eddie Creatchman, Black Baron, The Grand Wizard, J. J. Dillon, Damien Kane, Larry Sharpe, Hugo Savinovich, Chicky Starr, Oliver Humperdink, Buddy Colt, George Cannon, Bearcat Wright, Big Bad John, Tony Montana, Gentleman Jim Holiday, and Rock Hunter. All were portrayed as "handlers" commissioned to control the Sudanese madman, while also doing most of the talking in promos and interviews. He has, however, spoken for himself in English-language promos while in Japan.

Due to his frequent travelling, Abdullah the Butcher usually served as more of a special attraction than as a consistent championship contender. Accordingly, Abdullah never did win a world heavyweight championship, though he would capture several regional titles during his career. He won his first major championship on October 23, 1967, when he teamed with Dr. Jerry Graham to defeat John & Carlos Tolos for the NWA's Canadian Tag Team Titles in Vancouver. A few years later, he ventured to the Montreal region, where he had three reigns as the IWA International Heavyweight Champion between 1969 and 1972, feuding against Ivan Koloff and Johnny Rougeau. He later served as one of the premier rule breakers in Calgary's Stampede territory, capturing the NWA Canadian Championship, as well as having six North American Heavyweight Title reigns during the early 1970s. On June 24, 1972, he defeated Ernie Ladd in Akron, Ohio, to capture his first of two NWF Heavyweight Championships. In 1972, he wrestled a few matches for World Wide Wrestling Federation. Also he worked for Stampede Wrestling from 1970 to 1974. During the mid-1970s, he frequently performed in Detroit, Michigan's Big-Time Wrestling territory, where he engaged in a rivalry against The Sheik. He teamed with Killer Tim Brooks to win the region's version of the NWA World Tag Team Titles before defeating Bobo Brazil on February 8, 1975, for the NWA United States Championship.

In addition to his successes in North America, Abdullah the Butcher performed in the Far East, Europe, the Caribbean, Australia, and Africa. On March 12, 1974, he traveled to New Zealand, where he captured the British Empire Commonwealth Title by defeating the nation's champion John da Silva. Abdullah also established himself as one of the premier attractions in Japan, where he competed as part of the round-robin tournament that ultimately crowned Giant Baba as All-Japan's inaugural PWF Heavyweight Champion in February 1973. On October 18, 1978, Abdullah won that same PWF belt when he defeated European former AWA champion Billy Robinson. On October 13, 1980, he also beat Jumbo Tsuruta to capture the NWA United National Heavyweight Title. He also feuded with Terry Funk in Japan, and Funk claims to have had one of his top three all-time greatest matches with Abdullah the Butcher.

He arrived in World Class Championship Wrestling (WCCW) in 1986, where he defeated The Great Kabuki for the Texas Brass Knuckles Title and waged war against the equally wild Bruiser Brody. In Puerto Rico, he was declared the first WWC Universal Heavyweight Champion in July 1982 following three reigns as the Puerto Rican champion between 1978 and 1981. He was introduced in World Championship Wrestling in a giant, gift-wrapped box. This giant box was to be Sting's birthday gift from Cactus Jack. Sting unwrapped his gift and Abdullah attacked him, leading to both Abdullah and Cactus feuding with Sting after the incident. The feud culminated in a "Chamber of Horrors" match at Halloween Havoc 1991, in which Cactus accidentally electrocuted Abdullah in an electric chair, leading to a brief feud between the former allies. In 1993, Abdullah arrived in ECW, where he participated in a storyline with Kevin Sullivan, Terry Funk and Stan Hansen, and wrestled at Ultra Clash and Bloodfest. In October 1999, Abdullah took part in the ill-fated Heroes of Wrestling pay-per-view with a match against the One Man Gang. The match ended in a double count-out. In late 2002, Abdullah made a one-night appearance in Ring of Honor as Homicide's partner, facing the Carnage Crew in a bloody Bunkhouse Brawl at ROH's Night of the Butcher. On December 13, 2008, Shreve wrestled against Balls Mahoney in Bayamon, Puerto Rico, during the annual event WWC Lockout.

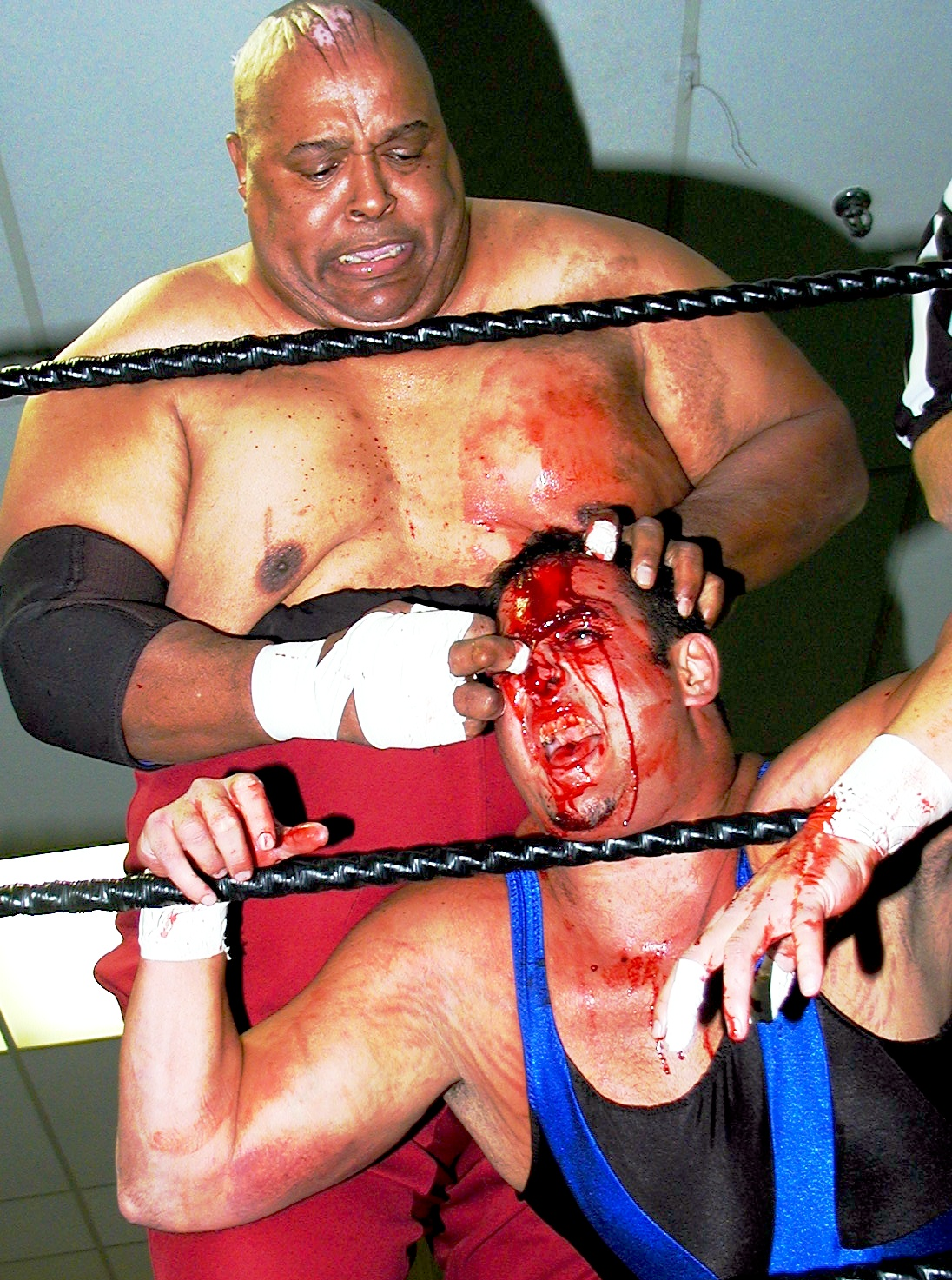
Abdullah the Butcher in a match in 2004

During July 2009, he wrestled in Dragongate and Hustle. He also wrestled at the New Japan Pro-Wrestling supershow Wrestle Kingdom IV in Tokyo Dome on January 4, 2010, as well as wrestling for Japanese independent promotion Osaka Pro Wrestling. In 2009, Abdullah made an appearance at the Decatur Book Festival, facing off against author Michael Muhammad Knight. Abdullah pummeled Knight with chairs, forks, and a water cooler, not even stepping into the ring. Knight was taken from the festival in an ambulance and received 46 stitches. It was Right After Wrestling in March 2011, hosted by Arda Ocal and Jimmy Korderas, that Abdullah admitted his favorite wrestler to face was actually Lou Thesz. His last match was on October 9, 2010, in a draw against Bull Buchanan at GCW Southern Legends Fan Fest.

Also in 2011, Abdullah returned to Georgia Championship Wrestling as a mentor and adviser to a local wrestler known as The Congo Warrior. On October 20, 2018, it was announced that Abdullah would have his retirement ceremony during the Giant Baba 20th Anniversary Memorial Show on February 19, 2019, at Sumo Hall in Tokyo.

== Legacy ==
Throughout his career, many video games have included depictions of Abdullah the Butcher, either as playable characters or as enemies. Some of these, such as Legends of Wrestling II, have included his name and direct likeness, whereas others such as HammerLock Wrestling and Appoooh include original characters inspired by Abdullah. Characters in Japanese anime or manga are also frequently designed to resemble Abdullah the Butcher, often with his signature scars. Examples include Abdullah from Kinnikuman, Abdullah the Criminal from One Piece, and Mr. Heart from Fist of the North Star.

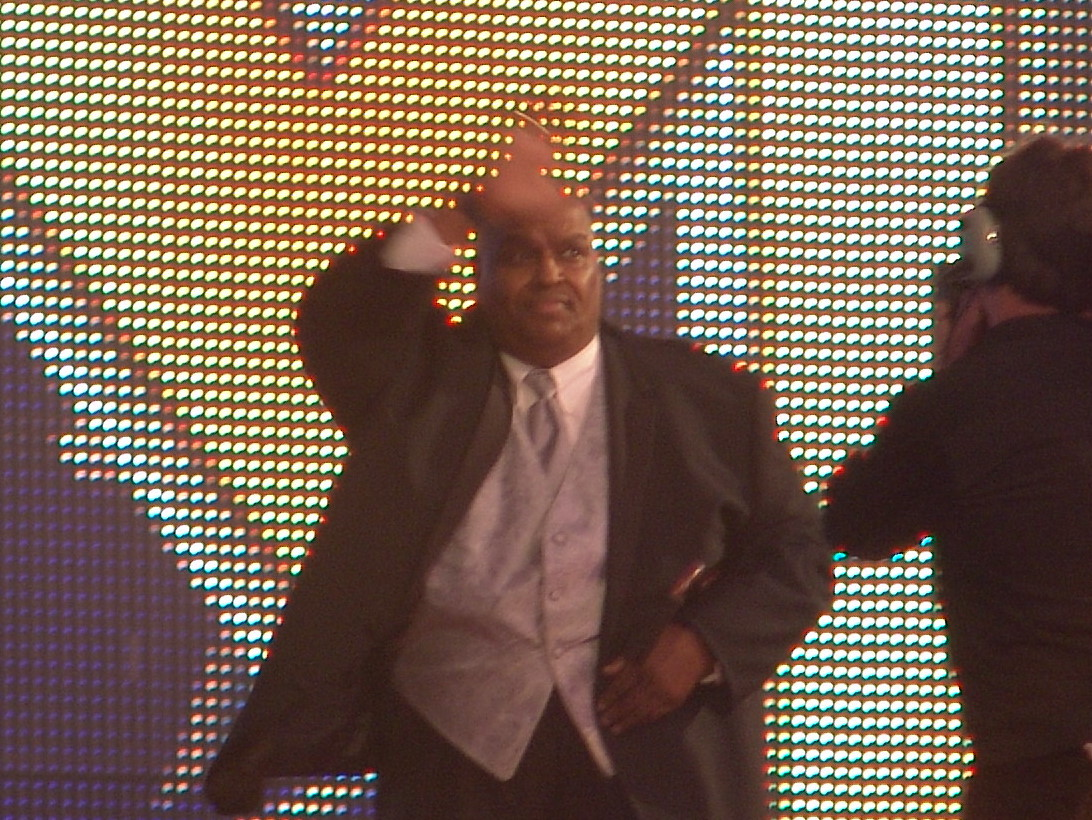
Abdullah the Butcher at his WWE Hall of Fame induction in 2011

In 2007, the WWE and Jakks Pacific released an Abdullah the Butcher "WWE Classic Superstars" figure complete with the blade marks on top of his head. A DVD was also released named The Triumph and Tragedy of World Class Wrestling which included a bloody cage match between Abdullah and his famous rival Bruiser Brody. The 2007, WWC's anniversary show was dedicated to Abdullah the Butcher's contributions to WWC.

On April 2, 2011, Abdullah the Butcher was inducted into the WWE Hall of Fame in Atlanta, Georgia. In early 2012, Abdullah the Butcher appeared on the Wrestling Marks of Excellence radio show and said he had given away his Hall of Fame ring to his brother, saying that he had been in the business and drew people from all over the world and should have been inducted decades ago. Following his WWE Hall of Fame induction, Superstar Billy Graham requested his name be removed from the Hall, saying: "It is a shameless organization to induct a bloodthirsty animal such as Abdullah the Butcher into their worthless and embarrassing Hall of Fame and I want the name of Superstar Billy Graham to be no part of it." In February 2015, Shreve announced on his Facebook page that he would be selling his WWE Hall of Fame ring.

Shreve has been accused of infecting other wrestlers with hepatitis C through sharing a blade and/or cutting wrestlers without their knowledge. Canadian wrestler "Hannibal" Devon Nicholson, who said he contracted hepatitis C when Shreve bladed him without consent, pursued legal action. On June 3, 2014, an Ontario court ruled in favor of Nicholson and ordered Shreve to pay $2.3 million in damages. The Fulton County Court of Georgia ruled that the Canadian judgment would be upheld in the state of Georgia where Shreve resides. Shreve was the trainer of Japanese wrestler Abdullah Kobayashi, whose style of wrestling and ring name were both directly inspired by Shreve's.

== Other media ==
Shreve has appeared in Japanese TV commercials for Suntory, Daikin Industries, Denon, and Sapporo Ichiban. He also had acting roles in the martial arts action film Roaring Fire, and the prison drama I'm Going to Get You, Elliott Boy.

Shreve has appeared in 12 video games, debuting in one of the first Appoooh, produced by Sega for Japanese Arcades. Shreve has also appeared in Super Star Pro Wrestling, Virtual Pro Wrestling 64, Virtual Pro Wrestling 2: Ōdō Keishō, Fire Pro Wrestling, "WCW vs nWo: World Tour" Fire Pro Wrestling 2, Legends of Wrestling II, King of Colosseum Red, Showdown: Legends of Wrestling, Fire Pro Wrestling Returns and Wrestle Kingdom 2: Pro-Wrestling World War.

== Business endeavors ==
Shreve previously owned two restaurants (one in Atlanta, Georgia and one in Japan) called Abdullah the Butcher's House of Ribs and Chinese Food. Shreve was often on hand to meet fans and sign autographs. It was referenced in the 2006 film ATL during a scene where three characters argue over a local barbecue. On July 24, 2016, it was reported that Shreve had closed his restaurant in Atlanta.

== Personal life ==
Shreve was hospitalized in July 2024 due to intestinal issues, and a GoFundMe was set up shortly afterwards.

Shreve was hospitalized with serious health issues in October 2025.

== Championships and accomplishments ==
- All Japan Pro Wrestling
  - NWA International Tag Team Championship (1 time) – with Ray Candy
  - NWA United National Championship (1 time)
  - PWF United States Heavyweight Championship (1 time)
  - PWF World Heavyweight Championship (1 time)
  - Champion Carnival (1976, 1979)
  - January 4 Korakuen Hall Heavyweight Battle Royal (2008)
  - Champion Carnival Fighting Spirit Award (1977)
  - Champion Carnival Outstanding Performance Award (1981)
  - World's Strongest Tag Determination League Distinguished Service Medal Award (1978) – with Tor Kamata & The Sheik
- Big Japan Pro Wrestling
  - BJW Deathmatch Heavyweight Championship (1 time)
- Big Time Wrestling
  - NWA United States Heavyweight Championship (Detroit version) (1 time)
  - NWA World Tag Team Championship (Detroit version) (1 time) – with Killer Tim Brooks
- Canadian Pro-Wrestling Hall of Fame
  - Class of 2023
- Cauliflower Alley Club
  - International Award (2025)
- Georgia Championship Wrestling
  - NWA Georgia Heavyweight Championship (1 time)
  - NWA Georgia Television Championship (1 time)
  - NWA Macon Heavyweight Championship (1 time)
- International Wrestling Association (Montreal)
  - MAC International Heavyweight Championship (3 times)
- Lutte Internationale
  - Canadian International Heavyweight Championship (1 time)
- Midwest Wrestling Federation
  - MWWF Heavyweight Championship (2 times)
- NWA All-Star Wrestling
  - NWA Canadian Tag Team Championship (Vancouver version) (2 times) – with Dr. Jerry Graham (1) and Armand Hussein (1)
  - NWA World Tag Team Championship (Vancouver version) (1 time) – with Dr. Jerry Graham
- NWA New Zealand
  - NWA New Zealand British Commonwealth Championship (1 time)
- NWA Southwest
  - NWA Texas Brass Knuckles Championship (1 time)
- National Wrestling Federation
  - NWF Heavyweight Championship (2 times)
  - NWF International Championship (1 time)
- Ohio Professional Wrestling Hall of Fame
  - Ohio Professional Wrestling Hall of Fame (Class of 2018)
- Pro Wrestling Illustrated
  - Ranked No. 35 of the 500 best singles wrestlers of the PWI 500 in 1991
  - Ranked No. 54 of the top 500 singles wrestlers of the PWI Years in 2003
- Professional Wrestling Hall of Fame
  - Class of 2019
- Stampede Wrestling
  - NWA Canadian Heavyweight Championship (Calgary version) (1 time)
  - Stampede North American Heavyweight Championship (6 times)
- Tokyo Pro Wrestling
  - TPW Tag Team Championship (1 time) – with Benkei
- Tokyo Sports
  - Match of the Year Award (1979) with Tiger Jeet Singh vs. Antonio Inoki and Giant Baba on August 26
  - Popularity Award (1978, 1980)
- World Class Wrestling Association
  - WCWA Brass Knuckles Championship (1 time)
- World Wrestling Council
  - WWC Caribbean Heavyweight Championship (2 times)
  - WWC Hardcore Championship (1 time)
  - WWC North American Heavyweight Championship (2 times)
  - WWC Puerto Rico Heavyweight Championship (3 times)
  - WWC Universal Heavyweight Championship (5 times)
- Trinidad and Tobago Wrestling Association
  - Trinidad & Tobago Heavyweight Championship (1 time)
- Wrestling Observer Newsletter awards
  - Wrestling Observer Newsletter Hall of Fame (Class of 1996)
- WWE
  - WWE Hall of Fame (Class of 2011)
