= Gino Brito =

Canadian professional wrestler (born 1941)

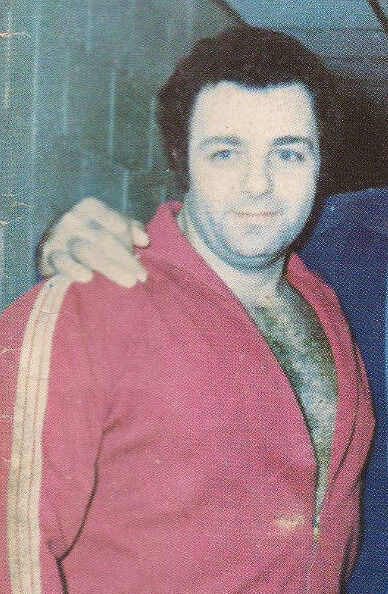
- Brito in 1976

Personal information
- Born: Louis Gino Acocella; May 18, 1941 (age 85) Montreal, Quebec, Canada
- Children: Gino Brito Jr.
- Family: Jack Britton (father)

Professional wrestling career
- Ring name(s): Gino Brito; Louis Cerdan
- Billed height: 5 ft 10 in (178 cm)
- Billed weight: 240 lb (109 kg)
- Trained by: George Cannon
- Debut: 1961
- Retired: 2004

Louis Gino Acocella (born May 18, 1941), better known by his ring name Gino Brito, is a retired Canadian professional wrestler and promoter. He was most popular in Montreal. As Louis Cerdan, he was a WWWF Tag Team Champion with fellow Italian-Canadian wrestler Tony Parisi. He trained another Italian-Canadian wrestler, Dino Bravo.

== Professional wrestling career ==
=== Active wrestler ===
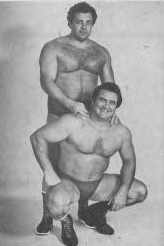
Brito (top) and Tony Parisi (bottom), c. 1983

Brito was the son of wrestler Jack Britton. Born Gabriel Acocella, he and his brother Luigi were renamed Jack Britton and Lou Kelly, respectively, by promoter Paul Bowser, who wanted to attract Boston's Irish population to his events by featuring "Irish" wrestlers.

He began working with Detroit promoters Bert Ruby and Harry Light over a year later., who organized a central booking office for midget wrestlers in the 1950s. Brito had a job for the promotion shuttling the wrestlers from city to city. Before becoming a professional wrestler at the age of seventeen, Brito was an amateur wrestler. At age seventeen, he was trained by George Cannon. He began working with Detroit promoters Bert Ruby and Harry Light over a year later.

He first teamed with Tony Parisi in Tennessee, where the duo won the tag titles in Nick Gulas's promotion within two weeks. The two also won the WWWF Tag Team Championship in 1975 from Blackjack Mulligan and Blackjack Lanza. They later lost the title to The Executioners. Brito continued to wrestle through the mid-80s.

=== Promoting ===
He also promoted shows under the International Wrestling banner in Montreal beginning in the 1980s, when he earned a television deal for his promotion. The promotion lost several key players in the mid-1980s, such as The Rougeaus, Rick Martel, and Dino Bravo. It held events that sometimes had up to 20,000 fans in attendance. The company, however, went bankrupt in 1987, nine months after the aforementioned wrestlers left. The promotion was the last Quebec-based promotion to have a weekly television show.

After International Wrestling closed, Pat Patterson convinced Brito to be the WWWF promoter in Montreal, a job Brito held for four years. Brito also appeared in the WWF old-timers battle royal in November 1987 (the first eliminated in a match won by Lou Thesz that featured several former world champions).

In 2003, Brito began promoting again with a promotion called Canadian Professional Wrestling (CPW) in Hull, Quebec. He joined with promoter Paul Leduc and his Montreal-based promotion. The promotion draws crowds of approximately 600 people every couple of months. More than 1,000 people attended the first anniversary event, in which Abdullah the Butcher and Pierre Carl Ouellet also participated. In October 2004, at the age of 63, Brito wrestled a match for the promotion, a loss in a six-man tag team match. In January 2005, the first of six events began airing on Canadian pay-per-view, which featured wrestlers from Brito's CPW, as well as footage from his International Wrestling promotion.

== Personal life ==
Brito's father, Jack Britton, and uncle were both professional wrestlers. Brito's son, Gino Brito Jr., also worked in the business for a short time.

He is of Italian descent, which is reflected in his ring name Gino Brito. To form the name, Brito shortened his father's name Britton. He was good friends with other Italian wrestlers, such as Tony Parisi, Bruno Sammartino, and Dominic DeNucci.

Brito was arrested in October 1992 on extortion and loan sharking charges in relation to his work as an "enforcer" for loan sharks in the Montreal area.

After finishing his career in the wrestling business, Brito began working at Subaru car business—buying and auctioning—with his brother-in-law.

== Championships and accomplishments ==
- Eastern Sports Association
  - IW North American Heavyweight Championship (1 time)
- Grand Prix Wrestling
  - Grand Prix Tag Team Championship (2 times) - with Dino Bravo
- Lutte Internationale
  - Canadian International Tag Team Championship (4 times) - with Rick McGraw (1) and Tony Parisi (3)
- World Wide Wrestling Federation / World Wrestling Federation
  - WWWF World Tag Team Championship (1 time) - with Tony Parisi
  - WWF International Heavyweight Championship (1 time)
