= Lutte Internationale =

Canadian professional wrestling promotion

Lutte Internationale / International Wrestling
- Founded: 1980
- Defunct: June 1987
- Headquarters: Montreal, Quebec, Canada
- Founder(s): Frank Valois, André the Giant and Gino Brito
- Owner(s): Frank Valois (1980–1986); André the Giant (1980–1984); Gino Brito (1980–1987); Dino Bravo (1982–1986); Rick Martel (1984–1986); Tony Mule (1984–1986); Eddie Creatchman (1986–1987); Floyd Creatchman (1986-1987)
- Formerly: Promotions Varoussac (1980–1984)

Lutte Internationale (French pronunciation: [lyt ɛ̃tɛʁnɑsjɔnal]; "International Wrestling") was a professional wrestling promotion based in Montreal from 1980 until 1987. The promotion was founded by Frank Valois, André the Giant and Gino Brito as Promotions Varoussac (VAlois, ROUSSimoff, and ACcocella Promotions). Lutte Internationale succeeded All-Star Wrestling and Grand Prix Wrestling as Quebec's top wrestling promotion for most of the 1980s.

It was the second of Canada's three major wrestling promotions, along with Maple Leaf Wrestling and Stampede Wrestling, to be put out of business by the World Wrestling Federation (now known as WWE). Many French Canadian professional wrestlers of the 1980s wrestling boom came to the U.S. from Lutte Internationale including, most notably, Dino Bravo, Rick Martel, Ronnie Garvin and The Rougeaus. The promotion's close in 1987 marked the end of the fifty-year "Golden Age of Wrestling" in Quebec.

== History ==
=== Early history (1980–84) ===
The promotion was founded by Frank Valois, André the Giant and Gino Brito as Promotions Varoussac, the latter made up of the first letters of their family names (VAlois, ROUSSimoff, and ACcocella). Montreal had been regarded as a wrestling capital since the 1930s, however, the close of All-Star Wrestling and Grand Prix Wrestling in 1975 left the city without a major company. Brito was eager to bring pro wrestling back to Montreal and persuaded fellow Grand Prix alumni André the Giant and manager Frank Valois to join in the venture. Andre was one of the most recognizable stars in the world at the time. Montreal was a second home for the French-born wrestler who owned a restaurant and had other business interests in the city. Between the two of them, Brito and Andre could bring in major U.S. stars though their contacts with the American Wrestling Association and World Wide Wrestling Federation. Andre's manager Frank Valois had the necessary business experience to run a wrestling company. The group believed that by using the traditional model of bringing in international stars to challenge local Quebec wrestlers, as well as taking the best qualities of All-Star and Grand Prix Wrestling, they could revive Quebec's wrestling scene.

Several different promoters had tried to start companies in Montreal with little success. One exception was Jack Britton who promoted shows under the "Olympia Pro Sports" banner from 1977 to 1980. Brito and his partners bought out his father's promotion during this period. Many Grand Prix mainstays joined the new promotion including Frenchy Martin, Gilles Poisson, Len Shelley, Ludger Proulx, Michel Dubois, Pierre "Mad Dog" Lefebvre, Serge Dumont, Zarinoff Leboeuf and the Rougeau Brothers (Jacques and Raymond Rougeau). The influx of major star power helped Promotions Varoussac obtain a television contract with CFCF-DT shortly after its debut. The promotion's flagship show "Les Étoiles de la Lutte" (The Stars of Wrestling), hosted by Édouard Carpentier and Guy Hauray, became one of the highest-rated French-language television programs in the province.

Their first major show was held on August 25, 1980, at the sold-out Paul Sauve Centre where Andre the Giant battled Hulk Hogan in the main event. This was the first meeting between the two superstars in Canada, the initial U.S. bout taking place two weeks earlier at Showdown at Shea, preceding their more famous showdown at WrestleMania III by seven years. Brito later claimed "the match put Montreal wrestling back on the map". The promotion needed a "hometown hero", a role formerly held by Yvon Robert, Sr. during the 1940s and 50s. Edouard Carpentier was considered too old by this point in his career. Jacques Rougeau, Sr. was retired and his son Raymond was still considered a light heavyweight wrestler. Dino Bravo, who ran a local wrestling school with Brito, ultimately emerged as Varoussac's top "babyface" after winning the Canadian International Heavyweight Championship from Lefebvre that same year.

The Paul Sauvé Centre was the promotion's original home arena. They occasionally visited Verdun Auditorium, the arena for rival Grand Prix Wrestling, when the Paul Sauvé Centre was booked for an annual Occult Sciences show. Varoussac Promotions' most noted event there was headlined by Dino Bravo and Zarinoff Leboeuf in a Russian Chain match in 1981. On July 26, 1982, Lutte Internationale premiered at the Montreal Forum bringing pro wrestling back to the venue after a six-year absence. Nick Bockwinkel defended the AWA World Heavyweight Championship against Tony Parisi at the Paul Sauvé Arena a year later; At the height of its popularity, the promotion held events that sometimes drew over 10,000 fans in attendance. Although never holding a stadium show like its predecessors, many of Lutte's shows at the Montreal Forum drew higher attendance figures than any other local promotion.

==== Quebec versus The World ====
The concept of bringing in foreign wrestlers and pitting them against local favorites was an immediate hit with French Canadian audiences. André the Giant and Dino Bravo were the initial headliners during the Promotions Varoussac era. Billy Robinson, a one-time British Heavyweight Champion, was one of the first successful foreign wrestlers to "invade" Quebec. He was accompanied by manager "Lord" Alfred Hayes. Hayes, who spoke French fluently, angered crowds with his upper class British accent in interviews. This helped establish Robinson as one of Lutte's most hated wrestlers. During his two years in Quebec, Robinson won the Canadian International Heavyweight Championship from both Rick Martel and The Destroyer. He was finally deposed as champion by Dino Bravo on September 21, 1983. Bravo also feuded with Masked Superstar, also managed by Alfred Hayes, for much of the year.

During the territory-era of pro wrestling, managers were an integral part of a successful promotion. The Quebec territory was a unique area given that it was a bilingual province. As the promotion was watched by English and French-speaking fans, it was necessary for managers to be fluent in both languages. Eddie "The Brain" Creatchman was the most notable of these heel managers. He was the longtime nemesis of Dino Bravo and managed many of the foreign wrestlers who challenged the heavyweight champion. Much like Bobby Heenan and The Heenan Family who harassed WWF World Heavyweight Champion Hulk Hogan in the U.S., Creatchman made it his mission to run Bravo and other fan favorites out of the territory.

==== Association with the World Wrestling Council ====
In addition to its co-promotional agreements with the AWA and WWF, Lutte Internationale strongest and most lasting relationship was with the World Wrestling Council. Abdullah the Butcher, who was one of Lutte's top "heel performers" during the mid-1980s, was the earliest WWC mainstay. As part of its talent exchange agreement, Joe Lightfoot and Pierre "Mad Dog" Lefebvre traveled to Puerto Rico where they won the WWC World Junior Heavyweight Championship and WWC North American Heavyweight Championship respectively. Bob Della Serra, who initially competed in Promotions Varoussac as masked wrestler The UFO, joined Don Kent as the new version of The Fabulous Kangaroos as Johnny Heffernan, the kayfabe son of original Kangaroo Roy Heffernan, winning the WWC World Tag Team Championship in 1982. Longtime Quebec stars Frenchy Martin and Jos LeDuc also returned to Canada after the formation of Lutte Internationale in 1984. Arguably the best known import from the WWC was King Tonga who feuded with Dino Bravo over the Canadian International Heavyweight Championship between 1984 and 1985. A Bravo-Tonga title bout at the Montreal Forum on December 23, 1984 attracted over 19,500 fans. After the WWF's talent raids in the mid-1980s, Lutte Internationale relied heavily on the WWC to supply wrestlers until its eventual close.

=== Lutte Internationale / International Wrestling (1984–85) ===
In early 1984, André the Giant sold his shares in Promotions Varoussac and left for the World Wrestling Federation. Rick Martel and Tony Mule purchased André's shares. By this time, Dino Bravo had also become a co-owner. With the change of ownership, it was decided to rename the promotion to Lutte Internationale (International Wrestling). Brito and Valois also produced a new television series, "Lutte Internationale" (International Wrestling), when Carpentier and Hauray signed with WWF at the end of the year. An English-language version was produced by George Cannon and Milt Avruskin in Windsor, Ontario. It aired locally in Montreal and was syndicated in other parts of the country. The Canadian International Television Championship was also introduced on "Les Étoiles de la Lutte" as a secondary title that undercard wrestlers could compete for. Leo Burke defeated Richard Charland in a tournament final to become the first champion. After the match, Charland attacked Burke and destroyed his trophy turning heel in the process.

Lutte Internationale soon began promoting outside the Montreal area. It regularly visited Hull, Quebec City, Sherbrooke, Verdun and other cities in southern Quebec. The promotion typically focused on summer tours as most arenas were used for hockey during the winter season. It also visited Ottawa, Edmundston New Brunswick and parts of the Northeastern United States. Many of these house shows later aired on Lutte's television show.

==== Battle for Quebec ====
The spring of 1984 saw a "babyface vs. babyface" feud between Rick Martel and Dino Bravo over the Canadian International Heavyweight Championship. Many of their bouts took place in Montreal and Quebec City, the hometowns of Bravo and Martel respectively, and the traditional rivalry of the cities was played up. Their first bout was on March 5 in Quebec City but Martel failed to win the belt. A rematch was held at the Montreal Forum a week later with former NWA World Heavyweight Champion Pat O'Connor as the special guest referee. The event drew 11,400 fans and saw Martel, a longtime "babyface", booed for the first time in his career. Martel failed to win the belt from Bravo and eventually left for the American Wrestling Association. When Martel won the AWA World Heavyweight Championship from Jumbo Tsuruta in May, he regularly defended the belt throughout Quebec.

==== Rise and fall of Le Merveille Masquee ====
In the mid-1980s, Lutte Internationale attempted to develop a local wrestler that they could turn into a major star. The promoters began grooming one of Edouard Carpentier's top students, Luc Poirier (Rambo and later Sniper in the WWF), for this role. Though he lacked in-ring experience, Poirier had a muscular build that was very much in vogue during the 1980s wrestling boom. Lutte decided to revive Eddie Quinn's popular "Le Merveille Masquee" (Masked Marvel) gimmick as a vehicle to introduce Poirier to the fans. The plan was for him to wrestle for a few months before being unmasked and then compete under his own name as an established star. Poirier was successful in limited television appearances and his distinct look set him apart from average preliminary wrestlers. His performance failed to improve as time went on. As the promoters began to question Poirier's motivation to pro wrestling, fan support for Le Merveille Masquee began to wane. In October 1984, the masked wrestler became a heel and started wrestling as The Mercenary. This too failed to interest fans and The Mercenary was unmasked by Gino Brito at the end of the month. Poirier had a brief tryout with the WWF during its Quebec invasion before disappearing from Canada altogether. He successfully spent the next twelve years wrestling in Europe where he became the CWA world heavyweight champion while working for Otto Wanz. He resurfaced in the WWF as part of The Truth Commission.

==== St. John the Baptist's Day Massacre ====
While Dino Bravo was Lutte's top star, the Rougeau Brothers were also popular with Quebec wrestling fans. One of the promotion's first major storylines was a three-month feud pitting The Garvin Brothers (Ronnie and Jimmy Garvin) against Jacques and Raymond Rougeau, then reigning Canadian International Tag Team Champions, in the summer of 1985. Their first encounter took place on June 24, 1985, at the Montreal Forum where thousands in attendance witnessed the Garvins deliver a ferocious beating to the tag team champions. Before the match got started, Jimmy Garvin's valet Precious blinded Jacques Rougeau with her perfume leaving Raymond at the mercy of their American opponents. After several minutes of the Garvins double-teaming Raymond, Jacques Rougeau, Sr. came out to help his son. The elder Rougeau also fell victim to the Garvins and sustained a serious back injury when Jimmy Garvin put Rougeau, Sr. in a Boston crab while Ronnie Garvin hit him a knee-drop from the top turnbuckle. The Montreal crowd was enraged as Jacques, Sr. was carried to the locker room on a stretcher. The incident was later referred to as "St. John the Baptist's Day Massacre".

The Rougeaus gained a measure of revenge the following month. Abandoning their familiar scientific wrestling style, the team bloodied the Garvins in a wild brawl that ended in a double-disqualification. Having recovered from his injuries, Jacques, Sr. accompanied his sons to the ring and congratulated them during the post-match celebration for both avenging their loss and protecting the reputation of the Rougeau wrestling family. The Garvin-Rougeaus feud concluded with a Steel Cage match in Sudbury, Ontario which saw the Rougeau Brothers walk away the victors. This bout was held outside Lutte Internationale's home territory as Quebec's Athletic Commission prohibited chain and steel cage matches at wrestling events. Sherbrooke, Québec had one of the cage matches between the Rougeaus and the Garvins. There were Athletic Commissions in Montréal and Québec City but not in the other cities of the province of Québec.

==== Death of Tarzan Tyler ====
The top heel performer in Lutte Internationale was Tarzan Tyler. Tyler was brought into Lutte three years earlier to replace manager "Lord" Alfred Hayes who was leaving to join the WWF as an announcer. Though his time as a manager was brief, among his "clients" included Pierre Lefebvre, Richard Charland, Sailor White, Rick Valentine, Masked Superstar and Jos Leduc. Tyler, who had been considering retirement prior to joining Lutte, agreed to become an active wrestler for promotion. On July 23, 1984, he led Lefebvre, Masked Superstar and Richard Charland in an 8-man tag team bout against The Rougeau Family (Jacques Sr., Armand, Raymond and Jacques Rougeau) at the Montreal Forum in front of 15,562 fans. King Tonga was billed as Tyler's "protege" and managed him against heavyweight champion Dino Bravo that same year.

In late 1985, Tyler joined forces with Abdullah the Butcher, Jos Leduc, and manager Eddie "The Brain" Creatchman to take control of Lutte Internationale from the promotion's "babyfaces". Tyler targeted Heavyweight Champion Dino Bravo while Abdullah the Butcher and Jos Leduc went after Tag Team Champions The Rougeau Brothers. The Rougeaus were then coming off their feud with The Garvins. Their upcoming battle with the Creatchman-Tyler group was intended to be a major storyline for the company heading into 1986. Abdullah the Butcher and Raymond Rougeau wrestled a few matches before a tag team bout was signed for December 28, 1985, in Sudbury, Ontario. The feud was cut short after Tyler, the group's leader, was killed in a car accident with fellow wrestler Pierre "Mad Dog" Lefebvre and referee Adrien Desbois, near the Laurentides Wildlife Reserve on Christmas Day. They were returning from a wrestling event in Chicoutimi, Quebec. The death of Tyler was considered both a business and personal loss for the company. The Rougeaus departed for the WWF two months later.

=== Relationship with the World Wrestling Federation (1985–86) ===
Though Lutte Internationale was enjoying unprecedented success in Quebec, WWF promoter Vince McMahon began pushing into Canada as part of its national expansion efforts in the early 1980s. In early 1984, the WWF drove George Cannon's "Superstars of Wrestling" promotion out of business and took over its television series on CFCF 12. By the end of the year, the WWF had purchased Toronto's Maple Leaf Wrestling and Calgary's Stampede Wrestling. McMahon then turned his attention to the outlaw promotion in Montreal. While Promotions Varoussac had a co-promotional agreement with Vince McMahon, Sr. to import WWWF stars, McMahon, Jr. did not continue this arrangement. Lutte Internationale no longer needed the WWF due to its own popularity but Brito decided to negotiate a talent exchange with Verne Gagne and the American Wrestling Association based in Minneapolis. This allowed the promotion to later benefit from the AWA's association with Pro Wrestling USA and bring in top U.S. stars such as Butch Reed, Jimmy Garvin, Tom Zenk, The Tonga Kid, and The Road Warriors. Several young up-and-coming wrestlers including Bruno Sammartino Jr., Mike Rotunda, Mike Shaw and Rick Steiner also spent time in Montreal.

==== Carpentier and Hauray join the WWF ====
Like his battles with National Wrestling Alliance promoters in the U.S., McMahon assumed he could outperform the Montreal promotion with its superior television programming. On May 29, 1984, Pat Patterson held a surprise WWF television taping at the Verdun Auditorium in an attempt to run against Lutte's show. McMahon underestimated the popularity of Lutte Internationale and the show drew poorly despite WWF World Heavyweight Champion Hulk Hogan and "Dr. D" David Shultz headlining the show. It was apparent to McMahon that he needed to change his strategy if the WWF's invasion of Quebec was to be successful.

In January 1985, shortly after leaving Lutte Internationale, "Les Étoiles de la Lutte" hosts Edouard Carpentier and Guy Hauray shocked Quebec wrestling fans when they signed a deal with CHLT-7 to switch their show to an all-WWF format. This would have left Lutte Internationale without television, however, Brito had reached an agreement with the Cogeco network for Lutte's second French-language show months earlier. Lutte also returned to the English-language station, with the help CFCF-12 program director Bill Merrill, and featured Milt Avruskin as the play-by-play man and Gino Brito doing color commentary.

==== Interpromotional shows ====
Brito recognized that McMahon had far larger finances at his disposal. The WWF could afford to lose money in a long-term promotional war whereas Lutte Internationale could not. The promotion attempted to negotiate a compromise with the WWF in mid-1985. In exchange for giving the WWF exclusive rights to Le Colisée in Quebec City, McMahon agreed to a co-promotional deal with Lutte Internationale for a series of interpromotional shows at the Montreal Forum. The "Quebec vs. WWF" bouts would take place in Lutte's wrestling ring. The Quebec wrestlers were to appear in the main event on four out of the six shows and guaranteed clean victories over the WWF stars. Lutte Internationale was also allowed to run house shows at the Paul Sauvé Centre unopposed. The concessions made by the WWF were unheard of at the time especially considering McMahon's dealings in the U.S. with major NWA promoters. Lutte's last show at the Montreal Forum took place on July 29, 1985, with 17,502 in attendance. At the top of the card, Masked Superstar made a final attempt to unseat heavyweight champion Dino Bravo before departing for the WWF. Bravo attempted to unmask Masked Superstar at the end of the match but was interrupted by a mysterious masked man later revealed to be Jos Leduc. Once one of Quebec's most popular stars, Leduc's heel turn shocked wrestling fans as he had been secretly attacking fellow Lutte babyfaces for several weeks.

The first "Lutte vs. WWF" show was held at the Forum on August 26, 1985. It was headlined by a tag team match with Dino Bravo and King Tonga battling Nikolai Volkoff and The Iron Sheik. The interpromotional series, which consistently drew between 15,000 and 21,000 fans, was very successful financially and proved to be one of the most popular programs in Quebec wrestling history. The final show was to have a "Champion vs. Champion match" between Dino Bravo and Hulk Hogan. It was originally planned to be held at Olympic Stadium in Montreal which had the potential of breaking the city's all-time attendance record. The venue was later changed to the Montreal Forum and the bout was advertised for January 13, 1986. The "Lutte vs. WWF" finale never happened and it has been suggested that Vince McMahon did not want to have Hogan lose to Bravo as the then WWF champion's popularity in the U.S. was at its peak. Bravo, who had been billed as WWF Canadian Champion on WWF shows in Canada, quit the company as a result and returned to Quebec. After six shows, the WWF pulled out of the deal and signed an exclusive contract with the venue in February 1986. It was widely speculated that McMahon used the interpromotional shows as an opportunity to gain a foothold in the city and force Lutte out of the Montreal Forum. Lutte's endorsement introduced the WWF to Quebec wrestling fans on the most favorable terms.

==== WWF talent raids ====
With the loss of the lucrative Montreal Forum, McMahon followed up by luring away Lutte's top stars. King Tonga and the Rougeau brothers were the first to jump to the WWF in the spring of 1986. Dino Bravo, who had had quit the WWF after the cancelled Montreal bout with Hogan, sold his share of the company to Brito and Rick Martel at the end of the year and rejoined the WWF full-time. Rick Martel and Tom Zenk followed Bravo soon after leaving Gino Brito, Eddie Creatchman and Floyd Creatchman the remaining owners of Lutte Internationale.

=== Demise and aftermath (1986–87) ===
No longer able to acquire top level talent from the U.S., Lutte appeared to be a "minor league" outfit operating from the much smaller Paul Sauvé Centre. To combat the WWF's talent raids, Brito scrambled to find new stars. Tom Zenk was being called the "future champion of Quebec" prior to his defection to the WWF with Rick Martel. Steve Strong quickly established himself as Lutte's top heel after feuding with Martel during 1986. One of the few stars to remain with Lutte was Richard Charland who helped bolster the promotion's tag team division. Another popular tag team were The Longriders (Bill and Scott Irwin) who won a championship tournament for the vacant tag team titles. A number of other wrestlers were brought in for one-time appearances. The Sheik, then in semi-retirement, was even called in mid-1987 but his exhibition bout failed to excite fans. Other future stars to appear in Lutte were Alofa, Billy Fury, Kevin Kelly, and Toshiaki Kawada.

Brito also looked to the WWC to supply wrestlers. A top star for Lutte during its final years, Abdullah the Butcher became a "babyface" and was booked against fellow WWC stars Bruiser Brody and Kareem Muhammad which he battled in a series of wild and bloody matches. Killer Tim Brooks showed up as Brody's storyline insane brother "Buster Brody". Hercules Ayala arrived to feud with Jos Leduc. Other notable WWC stars to appear in Lutte Internationale included Kendo Nagasaki, Jason the Terrible, Sweet Daddy Siki and David Shultz. This new emphasis on hardcore wrestling turned off many Quebec wrestling fans. Abdullah the Butcher won the Canadian International Heavyweight Championship from Hercules Ayala on February 22, 1987, and remained champion until the promotion's close.

In an attempt to cut costs, a number of masked wrestlers began appearing on shows; local preliminary wrestlers, such as Verne Siebert (using the name The Spoiler, not to be mistaken for Don Jardine), often donned wrestling masks to wrestle one match and then wrestle as themselves on the same card.

The promotion suffered another loss with the departure of longtime manager Eddie Creatchman. He was replaced by his real-life son "Pretty Boy" Floyd Creatchman. He not only took on his father's role as the area's top heel manager but also hosted an interview segment called "Creatchman’s Corner" on Lutte's weekly television show. Floyd Creatchman later joined CFCF sports staffer Ron Francis as the announcing team for "Lutte Internationale" during its last year on the air. The declining quality of its television show, particularly after the departure of Milt Avruskin, was made even more apparent to fans when compared to the polished look of WWF programming. Lutte was the last Quebec-based promotion to have a weekly television show.

In their final year of operation, Lutte toured Ontario and held shows in Toronto, Sudbury, and Thunder Bay. The company, however, went bankrupt in June 1987, less than a year after the WWF's talent raids. Lutte's final show in Verdun, Quebec featured Abdullah the Butcher wrestling Gino Brito in the main event. After Lutte closed, Pat Patterson convinced Brito to be the WWF promoter in Montreal, a job Brito held for four years.

== Lutte Internationale 2000 ==
In the mid-1990s, Montreal experienced a revival of sorts when Jacques Rougeau, Jr. began promoting in the area. His first major effort was in 1995 where he staged several shows at the Verdun Auditorium. He had intended to establish a major promotion with a small group of hand picked wrestlers. Though Quebec fans were receptive, Rougeau's promotion closed after a few weeks. While working for World Championship Wrestling, Rougeau held a one-time interpromotional card at the Molson Centre on April 11, 1997. The show featured wrestlers from Rougeau's small independent group as well as several WCW stars including, most notably, Hollywood Hogan. Hogan, then WCW World Heavyweight Champion, lost to Rougeau in a non-title bout. This was done without the approval of WCW President Eric Bischoff, as Hogan enjoyed full creative control over his in-ring character, and a return bout was teased entitled the "Battle for Quebec". In spite of the promotional war between WCW and the WWF, Bischoff did not follow up on the Hogan–Rougeau angle and left McMahon in control of Quebec.

In 1999, Rougeau tried to resurrect Montreal's "outlaw" promotion by opening "Lutte Internationale 2000". The shows featured both students of his wrestling school, such as LuFisto, Max Boyer, and Pauly Platinum, as well as King Kong Bundy, Pierre Carl Ouellet, Richard Charland, and Raymond Rougeau. American female wrestler Amanda Storm also appeared for Lutte Internationale 2000 during her rookie year. One of Rougeau's events drew an impressive 3,500 fans in Chicoutimi while another was held at the Molson Centre in Montreal. Lutte Internationale 2000 also sold out the Verdun Auditorium in December 2000. The shows received mixed reviews as many Quebec's "modern" wrestling fans, long accustomed to the WWF's "sports entertainment", were not used to Rougeau's traditional style of booking which was more "family friendly" than hardcore. His shows were sporadically held until under the "Lutte Familiale" banner until 2011.

== Legacy ==
I wonder, in this age, if the casual fan has that interest in [Quebec territory] pro wrestling, but they should. We should all have such high standards. Because the regional promotions like Grand Prix and Lutte Internationale were the foundation of the industry for most of its history, and the training ground of so many of the greats, watching it gets you involved in the big angles, the development of those stars and the vast difference in approach between today and yesteryear.

— Joe Babinsack, F4Wonline.com (July 21, 2013)

Lutte Internationale marked the final phase in Montreal's "Golden Age of Wrestling". A fifty-year period stretching back to the 1930s with promoter Eddie Quinn, it was one of the last territory-era promotions in Canada. Many French Canadian stars found a home in the World Wrestling Federation during the 1980s wrestling boom, however, the close of Lutte Internationale meant that aspiring wrestlers had nowhere to hone their craft. A few independent promotions attempted to run in Montreal during the 1990s, the most successful being Northern Championship Wrestling (1996–) and International Wrestling Syndicate (1998–), but it would be nearly a decade before the city had a viable "indy scene". Both Grand Prix and Lutte Internationale were profiled in the 2013 documentary The Golden Age of Quebec Wrestling. Joe Babinsack of the Wrestling Observer Newsletter reminded fans of their contributions to the Canadian and U.S. wrestling industry.

Lutte Internationale's video library is one of the few not owned by World Wrestling Entertainment. According to wrestling historian Patric Laprade, its footage is in the public domain. The master tapes were not kept when the company went bankrupt and the only known footage of its television show exists due to dedicated fans who recorded episodes on VCRs. Laprade and Montreal wrestling promoter Bertrand Hébert used much of this footage for their DVD releases on Quebec wrestling.

== Championships and programming ==
=== Championships ===
Championship	Notes
Canadian International Heavyweight Championship	The heavyweight title of Lutte Internationale / International Wrestling. It was defended from 1976 until 1987.
Canadian International Tag Team Championship	The tag team title of Lutte Internationale / International Wrestling. It was defended from 1976 through 1987.
Canadian International Television Championship	The title was established in 1983 and continued to be defended until 1987.

=== Programming ===
Programming	Notes
Les Étoiles de la Lutte	(1980–1984) Broadcast exclusively on CHLT-TV from Sherbrooke, Québec. The show was also broadcast on the regional channels of the TVA television network. An English-language version was available on the nationally syndicated Superstars of Wrestling.
Lutte Internationale	(1984–1987) French-language version. Syndicated, also broadcast on the Cogeco network.
International Wrestling	(1984–1987) English-language version. Syndicated, also broadcast on CFCF-12 and the MCTV-CTV system (covering Northeastern Ontario, Abitibi-Témiscamingue Quebec).
