= Moondog King =

Canadian professional wrestler (1949 – 2005)

- Moondog King, c. 1981

Personal information
- Born: Edward John White; May 18, 1949 St. John's, Newfoundland and Labrador, Canada
- Died: August 26, 2005 (aged 56) St. John's, Newfoundland and Labrador, Canada

Professional wrestling career
- Ring name(s): Big John Strongbo; Moondog King; Sailor White; Knuckles McKnight; The Wharf Rat; The Canadian Hit Man; The Spoiler
- Billed height: 5 ft 11 in (180 cm)
- Billed weight: 310 lb (141 kg)
- Debut: May 22, 1972
- Retired: 1991

Edward John White (May 18, 1949 – August 26, 2005) was a Canadian professional wrestler, best known as Sailor White and as Moondog King of The Moondogs when he joined the World Wrestling Federation in the early-1980s. White won championships in Canada and around the globe. He also wrestled in South Africa as Big John Strongbo.

== Professional wrestling career ==
After doing work on Great Lakes boats, White made his professional wrestling debut in Pembroke, Ontario, on May 22, 1972, against Michael Gango for promoter Larry Kasaboski. While in Quebec he was the Grand Prix tag team champion in 1976, International Heavyweight champion in 1982, International tag team champion twice in 1982–1984 and won the Canadian Television Championship in 1984.

He was most known for his time in the WWF as Moondog King where he teamed with Moondog Rex and won the WWF Tag Team Championship (then WWWF) from Tony Garea and Rick Martel in Allentown, Pennsylvania, in March 1981.

After he was denied re-entry to the United States at the Canada–United States border, the WWWF replaced him with substitutes including Stan Hansen, Hulk Hogan, Lou Albano and Sgt. Slaughter before selecting Moondog Spot as a permanent replacement. Gorilla Monsoon explained his absence stating King had been hit by a car. White claims the border dispute involved a rival wrestling promoter alerting the authorities to his criminal past whereas some say it was drug related.

After the WWF, he worked in Montreal for Lutte Internationale teaming with Gilles Poisson. He retired from wrestling in 1986. Then on October 22, 1990, he returned to a WWF house show as "Sailor Moondog White" where he lost to The British Bulldog at the Ottawa Civic Center. In 1991, he appeared a few appearances for World Championship Wrestling in house shows where he fought against Brad Armstrong. His last match was a victory over Mike Winter.

White was active in Canadian politics. In May 2000, White stood for election to the House of Commons of Canada in a St. John's West by-election, representing the Canadian Extreme Wrestling Party. His motto was "Parliament Needs a Moondog". On July 28, 2004, White again ran for the House of Commons of Canada, this time representing the Green Party of Canada in Bonavista—Exploits, but lost to Scott Simms of the Liberal Party of Canada. White received 367 votes to Simms's 15,970.

== Illness and death ==
White suffered from Bell's palsy in 1999 and had two heart attacks by then. In 2002, he underwent triple bypass surgery and on December 2, 2004, his taxi crashed, breaking two bones in his neck and pinching a nerve in his spinal cord. He remained hospitalized on life support until his death on August 26, 2005. White was survived by his daughter, Rozlynn White, and grandchildren, Keygan Hewitt, Hudson, Owen, Ethan and Quinton. His biography Sailor White was written by Dave Elliott.

== Championships and accomplishments ==
- Eastern Sports Association
  - NWA Canadian Heavyweight Championship (Halifax version) (1 time)
- Lutte Internationale
  - Canadian International Heavyweight Championship (1 time)
  - Canadian International Tag Team Championship (3 times) – with Serge Dumont (1 time), Gilles Poisson (1 time), and Rick Valentine (1 time)
- World Wrestling Federation
  - WWF Tag Team Championship (1 time) – with Moondog Rex
