= Bobby Sharp =

Canadian professional wrestler

Personal information
- Born: Robert Sharp; September 10, 1988 (age 37) Edmonton, Alberta, Canada

Professional wrestling career
- Ring name: Bobby Sharp
- Billed height: 6 ft 0 in - 6 ft 1 (185 cm)
- Billed weight: 205 lb - 209 lb (95 kg)
- Billed from: Sherwood Park, Alberta, Canada
- Trained by: Andy Anderson; Chi Chi Cruz; Sean Dunster; Eddie Watts; Phil Lafon
- Debut: 2003

Robert Sharp (born September 10, 1988) is an active Canadian professional wrestler, better known by his ring name "Lion Warrior" Bobby Sharp. He is currently working for numerous companies across Canada including Atlantic Grand Prix Wrestling, High Impact Wrestling Canada, Monster Pro Wrestling, and Real Canadian Wrestling. Sharp is a Cauliflower Alley Club Future Legend award winner (and the third Canadian to win the award) and a Canadian National Wrestling Association (CNWA) National Champion (2012).

== Professional wrestling career ==
Bobby Sharp had his first professional wrestling match at the age of 14 in Edmonton, Alberta for Monster Pro Wrestling. He continued his career as one of the youngest active Canadian Wrestlers in history, and became the youngest Canadian Jr. Heavyweight Champion ever in March, 2005 at age 16. He would go on to win the championship a second time in July of the same year. It was also in 2005 that the Edmonton Combative Sports Commission voted Sharp as the Professional Wrestler of the Year, and he remains the youngest recipient to win that award to date.

=== Independent wrestling (2009-present) ===
Bobby Sharp has been a regular on the Canadian Independent wrestling scene for the better part of ten years. During which he has competed for World Wrestling Entertainment, Monster Pro Wrestling, Prairie Wrestling Alliance, Elite Canadian Championship Wrestling, High Impact Wrestling Canada, Stampede Wrestling, Atlantic Grand Prix Wrestling, Global Force Wrestling, Canadian Wrestling Elite, Action Wrestling Entertainment, Wrestling Fan Xperience, Canadian National Wrestling Alliance, Hart Legacy Wrestling, Destiny Wrestling, and Border City Wrestling among many other companies. In 2013 Sharp was booked in the maritimes to tour for the reboot of Atlantic Grand Prix Wrestling. He continued touring alongside Rene Dupree as the "Canadian Outlawz.

=== Can-Am School ===
In 2016, Sharp moved to Ontario to further his training with Scott D'Amore and Johnny Devine.

=== Ontario Wrestling ===
Bobby Sharp debuted for Global Force Wrestling in a tag team match with partner Cody Deaner at the October 2nd Global Showdown 2016 event in Mississauga. The event was taped for TV.

=== Return to Edmonton ===
Bobby Sharp returned to Edmonton at some point and wrestled for companies like Top Talent Wrestling and Real Canadian Wrestling.

== Personal life ==
Sharp is in a long time relationship with fellow wrestler Kat Von Heez. In 2015 they both auditioned for the WWE series Tough Enough.

On December 24, 2015; Sharp proposed to longtime girlfriend Von Heez.

== Championships and accomplishments ==
- All-Star Wrestling - British Columbia
  - ASW Tag Team Championship (1 time) - with Tyler James
  - West Coast Tag Team Classic II (2018) – with Tyler James
- CanAm Wrestling
  - CanAm Community Chaos Championship (1 time)
  - CanAm Stu Hart Memorial Heavyweight Championship (1 time)
- Canadian National Wrestling Alliance
  - CNWA National Championship (2 times, inaugural, current)
  - CNWA National Title Tournament (2012)
- Cauliflower Alley Club
  - Future Legend Award (2013)
- Edmonton Combative Sports Commission
  - Edmonton Combative Wrestler of the Year (2005)
- High Impact Wrestling
  - HIW Central Canadian Heavyweight Championship (1 time)
  - HIW Wildside Provincial Championship (2 times)
  - Principal Pound "School of Hard Knocks" Memorial Battle Royal (2019)
  - King's Challenge V Tournament (2015)
- Monster Pro Wrestling
  - MPW Heavyweight Championship (1 time)
  - MPW Provincial Championship (3 times)
  - MPW Ripper Hardcore Championship (1 time)
- Pure Power Wrestling
  - PPW Heavyweight Championship (2 times)
  - PPW Western Canadian Championship (1 time)
- Prairie Wrestling Association
  - PWA Mayhem Championship (1 time)
  - PWA Canadian Tag Team Championship (2 times) - with Scotley Crue (1) and Michael Allen Richard Clark (1)
- Pro Wrestling Illustrated
  - PWI ranked him #376 of the top 500 singles wrestlers in the PWI 500 in 2014
- Real Canadian Wrestling
  - RCW Alberta Heritage Championship (1 time)
  - RCW British Commonwealth Championship (2 time, current)
  - RCW Canadian Heavyweight Championship (1 time)
  - RCW Lightweight Championship (1 time)
  - RCW North American Championship (1 time)
- Thrash Wrestling
  - Thrash Wrestling Championship (1 time)
  - Thrash Wrestling Tag Team Championship (1 time) - with Vance Nevada
- Wild Rose Sports Association
  - WRSA Heavyweight Championship (1 time)
- Best Entertainment Wrestling
  - BEW Interim National Heavyweight Championship (1 time)
