= Wavell Starr =

Canadian professional wrestler

Personal information
- Born: August 29, 1973 (age 52) Prince Albert, Saskatchewan, Canada

Professional wrestling career
- Ring name(s): Wavell Starr; Renegade Warrior; Standing Thunder; Donnie Mack; Sitar Singh
- Billed height: 6 ft 0 in (1.83 m)
- Billed weight: 235 lb (107 kg)
- Billed from: India (Sitar Singh)
- Trained by: Bruce Hart, Keith Hart
- Debut: 1997
- Retired: 2022

Wavell Starr (born August 29, 1973) is a retired Canadian-Indigenous professional wrestler who worked in Western Canada in independent promotions; including Stampede Wrestling,Real Canadian Wrestling, and High Impact Wrestling Canada.

== Professional wrestling career ==
Trained by Bruce Hart and Keith Hart in Calgary, where he began his wrestling career in 1997. Early in his career he worked for independent promotions in Alberta, Saskatchewan, British Columbia, and Manitoba. Worked for Stampede Wrestling from 1999 to 2000.

On January 7, 2004, he made his debut in the United States for Ohio Valley Wrestling in Louisville, Kentucky as Standing Thunder where he defeated Joey Matthews. On January 14, 2004, he defeated Mark Magnus for #1 Contendership. The enxt week, he lost to OVW Heavyweight Champion Nick Dinsmore. Also defeated Stevie Richards on February 7. Later teamed with Matt Cappotelli. He left Ohio Valley in April 2004.

From 2004 to 2006, Starr worked for the WWE where he fought against Maven, Mark Jindrak, Brian Christopher, Tajiri (wrestler), Tyson Tomko and Gregory Helms.

On April 21, 2010, he teamed with Cliff Corlene as they lost to the New Age Outlaws (Billy Gunn and Road Dogg) in Regina for Canadian Wrestling's Elite. Starr lost to NWA World Heavyweight Champion Adam Pearce at WFX Wrestling's 'Conflict of Interest to the Extreme 2010'. Starr then lost to Tatanka on May 31, 2012, in Gladstone, Manitoba for Canadian Wrestling's Elite. On May 25, 2013, he lost to Bushwhacker Luke in Camrose, Alberta for Real Canadian Wrestling.

On January 24, 2014, Starr dropped the Real Canadian Wrestling (RCW) Canadian Heavyweight Championship to Chris Masters. Then defeated Masters for the title the next day.

His last match was on October 21, 2022, when he defeated Tyler James at Ringside Oktoberfest in Regina, Saskatchewan.

== Personal life ==
Starr is Cree. Starr earned a degree from the First Nations University of Canada in arts with a major in indigenous studies. Currently works for the Government of Saskatchewan as director for Indigenous Relations.

Also Starr coached hockey his son's hockey team.

He was inducted into the Saskatchewan Sports Hall of Fame in 2019 where he played with the football team Regina Rams from 1993 to 1995.

== Championships and accomplishments ==
- Real Canadian Wrestling
  - RCW Canadian Heavyweight Championship (3 times)
- High Impact Wrestling Canada
  - HIW Central Canadian Heavyweight Championship (2 times)
  - HIW Internet Championship (1 time)
  - HIW Tag Team Championship (1 time) - with Plum Loco
- Canadian Wrestling Federation
  - CWF Heavyweight Championship (1 time)
  - CWF Tag Team Championship (1 time) with Steve Jaworski
- Saskatchewan Sports Hall of Fame (2019)
