= Vance Nevada =

Canadian professional wrestler

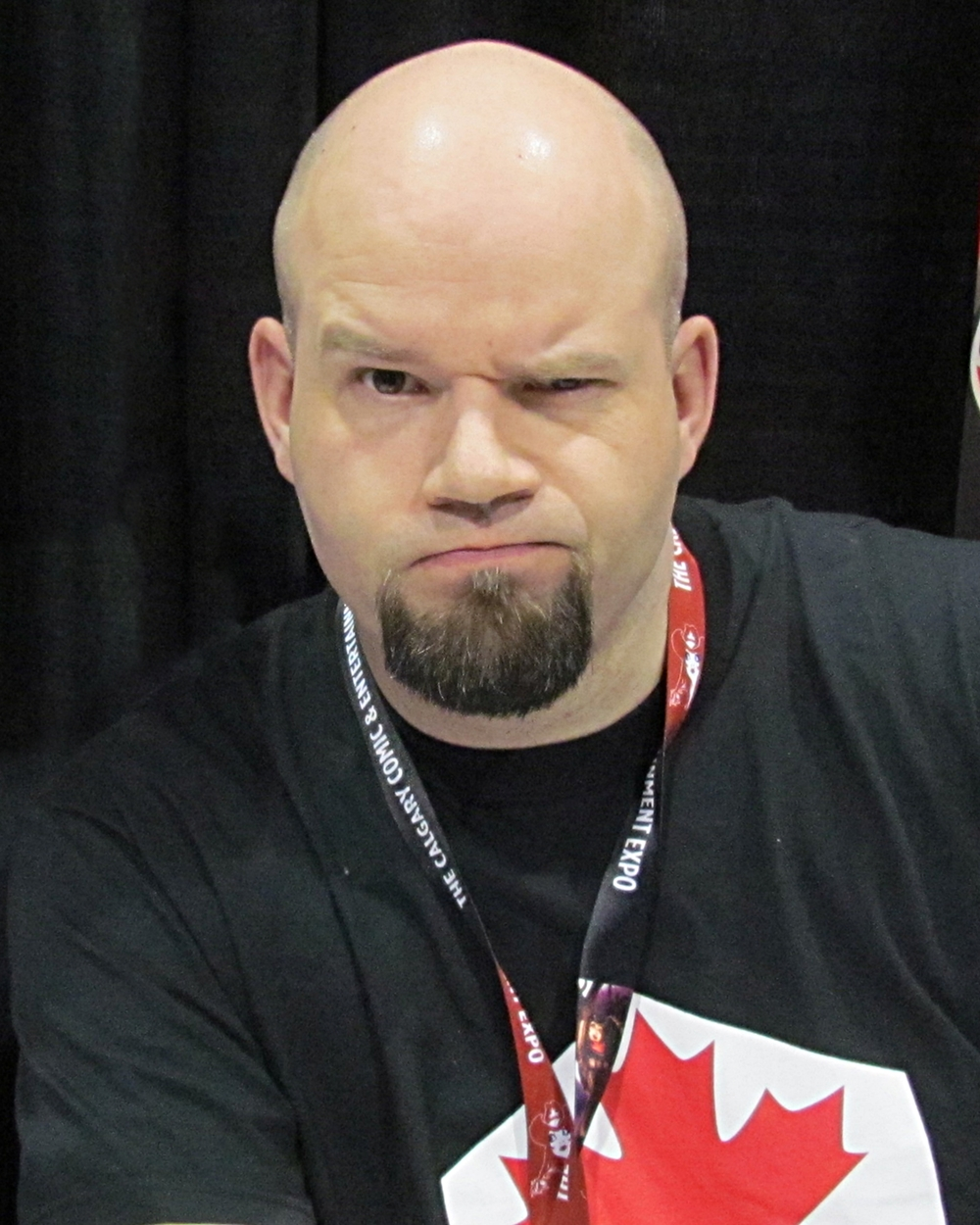
- May at the Calgary Comic and Entertainment Expo, BMO Centre on 28 April 2012

Personal information
- Born: Vern May; December 31, 1975 (age 50) Souris, Manitoba, Canada

Professional wrestling career
- Ring name(s): Black Dragon; Black Ninja; Blue Power Ranger; Catastrophe; Fabius Maximus; Great Cletus; Insanity; Lucha Larry; Oriental Demon; Red Dragon; Vance Nevada; Vern May; XXX
- Billed height: 5 ft 11 in (1.80 m)
- Billed weight: 185 lb (84 kg)
- Trained by: Ernest Rheault
- Debut: 1993

Vern May (born December 31, 1975), better known by his ringname Vance Nevada, is a Canadian professional wrestler, author, professional wrestling promoter and wrestling historian.

== Professional wrestling career ==
Since his early matches in 1993, Vance Nevada has maintained an active touring schedule, appearing for 64 wrestling organizations across Canada and competing in multiple provinces and territories during his career. His work across different regions has exposed him to a variety of professional wrestling communities and fan cultures.

In addition to his success between the ropes which has included matches against ring legends and today's top stars from Jim Neidhart, Matt Borne and the Honky Tonk Man to Kenny Omega, Kyle O'Reilly and the Bollywood Boyz, Vance Nevada is regarded as one of the premiere historians of Canadian ring lore, having published three books on the topic and being awarded with the James C. Melby Historian Award by the U.S.-based Cauliflower Alley Club for his efforts.

Aside from his endeavours to preserve wrestling's past, while also actively participating in wrestling's present, Nevada is a life member of the Cauliflower Alley Club, a benevolent organization of wrestling professionals that provides funding and resource support for wrestling's alumni in the face of medical and personal hardship. In addition to his role on the advisory board and committee appointments, he has served as the editor for the club's international newsletter since 2020.

Between 1994 and 2009, Nevada was ranked in the Pro Wrestling Illustrated magazine top 500 ten times. In February 2022, he eclipsed the all-time record set by Leo Burke for most Canadian wrestling title reigns at 44.

Nevada has done four Canadian Death Tours.

== Personal life ==
He resides in Wetaskiwin, Alberta with his wife Karen, and young two sons. He has an older daughter in Calgary.

== Championships and accomplishments ==
- 365 Pro Wrestling
  - PWA Tag Team Championship (1 time) - with Ice
- All-Star Wrestling
  - ASW Trans-Canada Heavyweight Championship (5 times)
  - ASW Tag Team Championship (1 time) - with Adam Ryder
- Canadian Wrestling's Elite
  - CWE Hall of Fame (Class of 2015)
- Canadian Pro-Wrestling Hall of Fame
  - Class of 2025
- CanAm Wrestling
  - CanAm Community Chaos Championship (1 time )
  - CanAm Heritage Heavyweight Championship (1 time)
  - CanAm Wrestling Junior Heavyweight Championship (2 times)
  - CanAm Tag Team Championship (3 times) - with Andy Anderson
- Cauliflower Alley Club
  - James Melby Historian Award (2010)
- Canadian Wrestling Federation
  - CWF Junior Heavyweight Championship (1 time)
  - CWF Tag Team Championship (5 times) - with Bugsy Slugg (1 time), EZ Ryder (1 time), JT Atlas (2 times), and Todd Meyers (1 time)
- Elite Canadian Championship Wrestling
  - ECCW Championship (1 time)
- Gold Dragon Wrestling
  - GDW Heavyweight Championship (1 time)
  - GDW Tag Team Championship (2 times) - with Bulletproof
- MainStream Wrestling
  - MSW Heavyweight Championship (1 time)
- Monster Pro Wrestling
  - MPW Heavyweight Championship (1 time)
  - MPW Tag Team Championship (1 time) - with Michelle Starr
- National Wrestling Alliance
  - NWA Canadian Heavyweight Championship (1 time)
- Pro Wrestling Illustrated
  - PWI ranked him #224 of the 500 best singles wrestlers in the PWI 500 in 2005
- Prime Time Wrestling
  - PTW Heavyweight Championship (1 time)
- Pure Power Wrestling
  - PPW Heavyweight Championship (1 time)
- River City Wrestling
  - Canadian Unified Junior Heavyweight Championship (6 times)
  - RCW Hardcore Championship (1 time)
  - RCW Junior Heavyweight Championship (1 time)
  - RCW Tag Team Championship (4 times) - with Robby Royce (3 times) and Bugsy Sluggs (1 time)
  - RCW Can-Am Six Man Tag Team Championship (1 time) - with Canadian Cannonball and Sluggo Smith (1 time)
- Canadian Wrestling Hall of Fame
  - Class of 2016
- Thrash Wrestling
  - Thrash Wrestling Tag Team Championship (3 times) - with Adam Ryder (1), Bobby Sharp (1), and Sean Gaston (1)
- Top Ranked Wrestling
  - TRW Tag Team Championship (1 time) - with Disco Fury
- Top Rope Championship Wrestling
  - TRCW International Heavyweight Championship (1 time)
  - TRCW Tag Team Championship (3 times) - with Rob Stardom (1) and TJ Bratt (2)
- Vancouver Island Pro Wrestling
  - VIPW Heavyweight Championship (1 time)
- Wild West Wrestling/Hardcore Wrestling
  - WWW Tag Team Championship (2 times) - with JT Atlas (1 time) and Scotty Simms (1 time)

=== Luchas de Apuestas record ===
Winner (wager)	Loser (wager)	Location	Event	Date	Notes
Vance Nevada (hair)	Scarface (mask)	Winnipeg, Manitoba	RCW @ Winnipeg	May 11, 1995	

== Works ==
"(Un)Controlled Chaos: Canada's Remarkable Professional Wrestling Legacy" (2022, Friesen Press)

The Ear, Cauliflower Alley Club newsletter - editor (2020–2022)

CNWA Magazine - lead writer/publisher (2012–2013, nine issues)

History of Professional Wrestling Series #5 - researcher (2002, Crowbar Press)

- Wrestling in the Canadian West

Central Canadian Professional Wrestling Almanac (1999, self-published)
