= Danny Duggan =

Canadian professional wrestler

Personal information
- Born: Daniel Warren; March 23, 1987 (age 39) Winnipeg, Manitoba

Professional wrestling career
- Ring name: Danny Duggan
- Billed height: 5 ft 11 in (1.80 m)
- Billed weight: 223 lb (101 kg)
- Billed from: Falcon Beach, Manitoba; Winnipeg, Manitoba
- Trained by: Gene Swan; Johnny Devine
- Debut: January 8, 2003

Daniel Warren (born March 23, 1987) is a Canadian professional wrestler and business entrepreneur who works for independent promotions all over Canada and United States under the name "Hotshot" Danny Duggan. He has worked for such promotions as High Impact Wrestling, Canadian Wrestling's Elite, Steel Domain Wrestling, NWA Wildside, among others. He has worked matches and been a prospect for Ring of Honor, Total Nonstop Action Wrestling, and WWE.

== Career ==
=== Training and early career ===
In 2001, at the age of 14, Duggan started training with "Tomahawk" Gene Swan and "Hot Shot" Johnny Devine. Swan was training out of the Canadian Wrestling Federation school. Devine was out of Winnipeg recovering from surgery and training in Action Wrestling Entertainment's facility. He worked the under cards of GPW before finally pushing to the Winnipeg Indy scene. At the age of 15, he made his debut for River City Wrestling on January 8, 2003, against "Sugar" Shane Rogers for the RCW 24/7 Championship in Winnipeg, but came up on the losing end.

=== Independent wrestling (2003-present) ===
==== Steel Domain Wrestling (2003-present) ====
Duggan made his debut for Steel Domain Wrestling on January 8, 2003. He defeated AJ Sanchez in his debut. On July 20, 2013; Duggan defeated Mitch Paradise to win the vacant SDW Championship as Steel Domain Wrestling was coming out of hiatus. Duggan's first reign would be the longest in company history at On September 17, 2016; Duggan defeated Ace Steel to become new SDW Champion after Mitch Paradise vacated it earlier in the month due to injury. On October 22, Duggan lost the SDW Championship to Aaron Corbin in a dog collar match. On April 8, 2017; Duggan made a surprise return as the mystery partner of "Tasty" Travis Cole and helped him win the SDW Tag Team Championships.

=== Ring of Honor (2010, 2015, 2016) ===
On March 20, 2010; Duggan made his Ring of Honor debut in a gauntlet dark match at Epic Encounter III. Bobby Dempsey defeated Duggan, Hornet, Lou Crank, Nick Nemesis, Rahim Ali, and RJ City. On November 13 at Fate of an Angel 2; Duggan teamed with Camikaze in a dark match. They lost to the team of Ashley Sixx and Rip Impact. On April 25, 2015, on the Conquest Tour; Duggan lost to Arik Cannon. On July 11, during the Aftershock Tour; Mark Briscoe defeated Duggan in a match taped for ROH TV. On June 11, 2016, on the Road to the Best in the World; He defeated Shaheem Ali in a dark match. On June 12; Cheeseburger defeated Duggan in a dark match.

=== Smash (2010) ===
In late 2010; Duggan made his debut for Tajiri's promotion Smash. On October 30 at Smash.9; Duggan teamed with Kim Nanpun to defeat Lin Bairon and Yusuke Kodama.

=== Wrestling New Classic (2013) ===
In late 2013; Duggan returned to Japan and competed for Tajiri's follow up promotion Wrestling New Classic. On November 29, Duggan teamed with Shinose Mitoshichi, Koharu Hinata, Masato Shibata and defeated Masaya Takahashi, Kaho Kobayashi, Hiroki Murase and Fujiwara Rionne in an eight man tag team match. On December 6; Duggan defeated Masaya Takahashi and Fujiwara Rionne in a three way match.

=== WWE (2016, 2017) ===
Duggan was security in the triple threat main event of the October 24, 2016, edition of Raw. The next night in a dark match before SmackDown Live, Duggan lost to Jack Swagger via submission. On the February 27, 2017, edition of Raw, Duggan was security during the Roman Reigns and Braun Strowman Fastlane contract signing. Reigns speared Strowman through the barricade wall, knocking Duggan over in the process.

=== DDT (2017) ===
In the summer of 2017; Duggan returned to Japan and worked a few dates for DDT Pro-Wrestling. At King of DDT 2017 on June 25; he teamed up with Daiki Shimomura in a losing effort against Tomomitsu Matsunaga and Kouki Iwasaki in a dark match. On July 2 at Good Evening from Shinkiba Village 2017; Duggan teamed up with Antonio Honda. They lost to the team of Daisuke Sasaki and Tetsuya Endo.

== Championships and accomplishments ==
- Action Wrestling Entertainment
  - King of the Canadian Indies (2005)
- Canadian Wrestling's Elite
  - CWE Central Canadian Heavyweight Championship (2 times)
  - CWE Heavyweight Championship (7 times)
  - CWE 123Approved.ca Open Rules Hardcore Championship (1 time)
  - CWE Tag Team Championship (3 times) - with Kenny Omega (1), Anderson Tyson Moore (1), and Tyler Colton (1)
  - CWE Tag Team Championship Tournament (2010) - with Kenny Omega
  - CWE Title Tournament (2020)
- Canadian Wrestling Federation
  - NWA/CWF Junior Heavyweight Championship (1 time)
- Northern Elite Wrestling
  - NEW Heavyweight Championship (1 time)
- Premier Championship Wrestling
  - PCW Tag Team Championship (1 time) - with Don Douglas
- Prime Time Wrestling
  - PTW Uptown Championship (1 time)
  - PTW US Fanny Pack Championship (1 time, inaugural, final)
- Pro Wrestling Illustrated
  - Ranked 374 of the 500 best singles wrestlers of the year in the PWI 500 in 2014
- Real Canadian Wrestling
  - RCW Midweight Championship (1 time)
- River City Wrestling (Manitoba)
  - RCW Tag Team Championship (1 time) - with JC Derkson
- Steel Domain Wrestling
  - SDW Northern States Championship (4 times)
  - SDW Tag Team Championship (1 time) - with "Tasty" Travis Cole
- Thrash Wrestling
  - Thrash Wrestling Championship (2 times)
- Under the Lights Entertainment
  - UTL Championship (1 time)
- West Coast Wrestling Connection
  - WCWC Pacific Northwest Championship (1 time)
  - WCWC Pacific Northwest Championship Tournament (2014)

== Filmography ==
Film
Year	Title	Role	Notes
2016	Hot Tub Party Massacre	Ken	
