= 1973 in professional wrestling =

1973 in professional wrestling describes the year's events in the world of professional wrestling.

== List of notable promotions ==
Only one promotion held notable shows in 1973.

Promotion Name	Abbreviation
New Japan Pro Wrestling	NJPW
Empresa Mexicana de Lucha Libre	EMLL

== Calendar of notable shows ==
Date	Promotion(s)	Event	Location	Main Event
April 21	AJPW	Champion's Carnival Finals	Tokyo, Japan	Giant Baba defeated Mark Lewin
April	EMLL	17. Aniversario de Arena México	Mexico City, Mexico	
September 21	EMLL	EMLL 40th Anniversary Show	Mexico City, Mexico	Ray and Ringo Mendoza defeated Ángel Blanco and Kim Chul Won in a Lucha de Apuesta hair vs. hair match

== Notable events ==
- April 14 - – Japan Pro Wrestling Alliance closed.
- September 6 - Carlos Colon, Victor Jovica and Gorilla Monsoon launched Capitol Sports Promotions in Puerto Rico.
- December 1 - Stan Stastak wins the WWWF Heavyweight title from Pedro Morales in Philadelphia, PA
- December 10 - Bruno Sammartino becomes the first two time WWWF Heavyweight Champion when he defeated Stan Stastak in New York, NY.

== Awards and honors ==
=== Pro Wrestling Illustrated ===
Category	Winner
PWI Wrestler of the Year	Jack Brisco
PWI Tag Team of the Year	Nick Bockwinkel and Ray Stevens
PWI Match of the Year	Dory Funk Jr. vs. Harley Race
PWI Most Popular Wrestler of the Year	Chief Jay Strongbow
PWI Most Hated Wrestler of the Year	Superstar Billy Graham
PWI Most Inspirational Wrestler of the Year	Johnny Valentine
PWI Rookie of the Year	Bob Orton Jr. / Tony Garea
PWI Woman of the Year	Joyce Grable
PWI Midget Wrestler of the Year	Little Beaver
PWI Manager of the Year	The Grand Wizard

== Championship changes ==
=== EMLL ===
NWA World Light Heavyweight Championship
incoming champion – Alfonso Dantés
Date	Winner	Event/Show	Note(s)
June 29	Kim Sung Ho	EMLL show	
December 21	Ray Mendoza	EMLL show	

NWA World Middleweight Championship
Incoming champion – Aníbal
Date	Winner	Event/Show	Note(s)
March 30	Rene Guajardo	EMLL show	

NWA World Welterweight Championship
Incoming champion – Alberto Munoz
Date	Winner	Event/Show	Note(s)
October 25	Vacant	EMLL show	
December 14	Mano Negra	EMLL show	

Mexican National Heavyweight Championship
Incoming champion – Angel Blanco
Date	Winner	Event/Show	Note(s)
October 26	Enrique Vera	EMLL show	

Mexican National Middleweight Championship
Incoming champion – Ciclon Veloz, Jr.
Date	Winner	Event/Show	Note(s)
December 14	Adorable Rubí	EMLL show	

Mexican National Lightweight Championship
Incoming champion – Estrella Blanca
Date	Winner	Event/Show	Note(s)
April 11	Tauro	EMLL show	

Mexican National Light Heavyweight Championship
Incoming champion – Enrique Vera
Date	Winner	Event/Show	Note(s)
March 16	Dr. Wagner	EMLL show	

Mexican National Welterweight Championship
Incoming champion – Karloff Lagarde
Date	Winner	Event/Show	Note(s)
August 11	El Marquez	EMLL show	
October 3	Fishman	EMLL show	

Mexican National Women's Championship
Incoming champion – Uncertain
No title changes

=== NWA ===
NWA Worlds Heavyweight Championship
Incoming champion – Dory Funk, Jr.
Date	Winner	Event/Show	Note(s)
May 24	Harley Race	House show	
July 20	Jack Brisco	House show	

== Tournaments ==
=== IWE ===
Accomplishment	Winner	Date won	Notes
IWA World Series	Great Kusatsu	October 10	
IWA World Tag Tournament	Big John Quinn and Kurt Von Hess	March 25	

== Births ==
- Date of birth uncertain:
  - Dudley Dudley
- January 9 - Magnum Tokyo
- January 14 - Miss Janeth (died in 2025)
- January 25 - Ace Steel
- January 26 - The Maestro
- February 8 - Raziel (died in 2022)
- February 11 – Hernandez
- February 21 - Brodus Clay
- February 22 - Mr. Niebla (died in 2019)
- February 28 – Masato Tanaka
- March 7 - Brazo de Platino
- March 8 - Aya Koyama (died in 2018)
- March 11 - Wataru Sakata
- March 20 - Scott Vick
- March 23 - Kevin Northcutt
- March 28 – Umaga (died in 2009)
- April 2 - Skulu (died in 2020)
- April 24 - StarBuck
- April 27 - E. Z. Money
- May 8 - Giant Ochiai (died in 2003)
- May 18:
  - Kaz Hayashi
  - The Blue Meanie
- May 25 - Rich Myers
- May 29 – Steve Corino
- June 4:
  - Mikey Whipwreck
  - Pablo Marquez
- June 19 - Lou Marconi
- June 21 - Tsubasa
- July 2 – Scotty 2 Hotty
- July 13:
  - Necro Butcher
  - Wifebeater
- July 26 - Yukio Sakaguchi
- August 12 – Jonathan Coachman
- August 25 - José Estrada Jr.
- August 27 - Jazz (wrestler)
- August 29 - Sinn Bodhi
- August 31 - Tank Toland
- September 22 - Bob Sapp
- September 24 - Bison Smith (died in 2011)
- September 29 - Wavell Starr
- September 30 - Cerebro Negro
- October 4 – Abyss
- October 16 – Justin Credible
- October 19 - Corporal Punishment
- October 26 – Taka Michinoku
- October 28 – Montel Vontavious Porter
- October 30 – Edge
- November 3 - Chase Tatum (died in 2008)
- November 20 - Becca Swanson
- November 27 – Evan Karagias
- November 30 – Christian
- December 3 – Super Crazy
- December 7:
  - Hack Meyers (died in 2015)
  - Wolfie D
- December 20 – Toscano
- December 25 – Chris Harris

== Retirements ==
- Dory Funk, Sr. (1940-April 26, 1973)
- Fritz Von Goering (1949-1973)

== Debuts ==
- Uncertain debut date

- Randy Savage
- Sika Anoa'i
- Bob Backlund
- Ray Candy
- Hector Guerrero
- Smith Hart
- Dean Hart
- Bruiser Brody
- Don Kernodle
- Dennis Condrey
- Gene Petit
- Pez Whatley
- Ron Mikolajczyk

- January 1 - Stan Hansen
- July - Sangre Chicana
- September 29 - KY Wakamatsu

== Deaths ==
- February 10 - Everett Marshall, 67
- March 8 - Bill Malone (broadcaster), 48
- April 1 – Jim Crockett, 63
- May 1 - Haystacks Muldoon, 43
- June 3 – Dory Funk, 54
- July 21 - Wild Red Berry, 66
- July 31 - Azumafuji Kin'ichi, 51
- December 1 – Black Guzmán, 57
- December 17 - Kazuo Okamura, 62
