= HIW Canadian Tag Team Championship =

Professional wrestling tag team championship

Details
- Promotion: High Impact Wrestling
- Date established: June 8, 2005
- Date retired: October 25, 2019

Other name
- HIW Tag Team Championship
Statistics
- First champions: Dylan Robson and Screaming Eagle
- Final champions: Team Flex Appeal (Michael Allen Richard Clark and Mike McSugar)
- Most reigns: As tag team: Dixie Dragon and Billy Bones, Intelli-Gents (Bucky McGraw and Jeff Tyler), The Best Tag Team in the Prairies (Dixie Dragon and Brett Evans), The Rambunctious Boys (Thryllin' Dylan and Dice Steele), Mentallo and Jeff Tyler, Los Rudos (Dice Steele and El Asesino), and Team Flex Appeal (Michael Allen Richard Clark and Mike McSugar) (2 times); As individuals: Dixie Dragon, Jeff Tyler, and Dice Steele (5 times)
- Longest reign: Team Flex Appeal (Michael Allen Richard Clark and Mike McSugar) (364 days)
- Shortest reign: Jumpin' Joe and Cannonball Kelly, Titan Tower and Matt the Ring Boy (1 day)
- Oldest champion: Principal Pound (41 years, 145 days)

The HIW Canadian Tag Team Championship was a professional wrestling tag team championship in the professional wrestling promotion, High Impact Wrestling. The championship was established on June 8, 2005 when Dylan Robson and Screaming Eagle defeated Antonio Scorpio Jr. and Curtis Knievel. On February 22, 2018; Los Rudos unveiled new title belts at Destruction Theory in Saskatoon, Saskatchewan. The titles became deactivated on October 25, 2019 after HIW's last show Monster Brawl VI as the company ceased operations. Canadian Wrestling's Elite acquired all of HIW's assets.

== Title history ==
=== Names ===
Name	Time of use
HIW Canadian Tag Team Championship	June 8, 2005 – October 25, 2019

=== Reigns ===
Key
No.	Overall reign number
Reign	Reign number for the specific champion
Days	Number of days held

No.	Champion	Championship change			Reign statistics		Notes	Ref.
No.	Champion	Date	Event	Location	Reign	Days	Notes	Ref.
1	Dylan and Screaming Eagle	June 8, 2005	House show	Regina, Saskatchewan	1	135	They defeated Antonio Scorpio Jr. and Curtis Knievel to become the inaugural champions.	
2	Dogs of War (Sgt. Sadistic and Cannonball Kelly)	October 21, 2005	House show	Regina, Saskatchewan	1	91		
3	Principal Pound and Todd Myers	January 20, 2006	House show	Regina, Saskatchewan	1	140		
4	Principal Pound (2) and Big Daddy Kash	July 9, 2006	House show	Regina, Saskatchewan	1	98	Todd Myers was also doing managing and ring announcing duties during his reign as HIW Tag Team Champion. Kash worked his way into doing the ring announcing duties as well. Myers challenged Kash to a match in the main event. Kash told him to put his half the Tag Team Championships on-the-line. Kash defeated Myers to become the new Tag Team Champion with Principal Pound.	
5	High Maintenance (Wavell Starr and Plum Loco)	September 15, 2006	House show	Regina, Saskatchewan	1	224		
6	Intelli-Gents (Jeff Tyler and Bucky McGraw)	April 27, 2007	House show	Regina, Saskatchewan	1	61	Intelli-Gents defeated Wavell Starr in a two-on-one handicap match.	
7	Dixie Dragon and Billy Bones	July 27, 2007	House show	Regina, Saskatchewan	1	160		
8	Jumpin' Joe and Cannonball Kelly (2)	October 4, 2007	House show	Moose Jaw, Saskatchewan	1	1		
9	Dixie Dragon and Billy Bones	October 5, 2007	House show	Regina, Saskatchewan	2	91		
10	Intelli-Gents (Jeff Tyler and Bucky McGraw)	January 4, 2008	House show	Regina, Saskatchewan	2	147		
11	Titan Tower and Matt the Ring Boy	May 30, 2008	House show	Regina, Saskatchewan	1	148	Randy Anderson was the replacement for Jeff Tyler.	
—	Vacated	October 25, 2008	—	Regina, Saskatchewan	—	—		
12	Bucky McGraw (3) and Mike Posey	May 15, 2009	House show	Regina, Saskatchewan	1	260	McGraw and Posey defeated Principal Pound and Headmaster Joseph in the finals of a tournament to crown new champions.	
13	Damage Inc. (Dice Steele and Crash Crimson)	January 30, 2010	House show	Regina, Saskatchewan	1	209		
14	Bad Influence (Rex Roberts and Cannonball Kelly (3))	August 27, 2010	House show	Regina, Saskatchewan	1	82		
15	Billy Bones (3) and Bull Bodnar	October 29, 2010	House show	Regina, Saskatchewan	1	322		
16	Jeff Tyler (3) and Jumpin' Joe (2)	September 16, 2011	House show	Regina, Saskatchewan	1	63		
17	The Best Tag Team in the Prairies (Dixie Dragon (3) and Brett Evans)	November 18, 2011	House show	Regina, Saskatchewan	1	176		
—	Vacated	May 12, 2012	—	Regina, Saskatchewan	—	—		
18	Jumpin' Joe (3) and Robbie Gamble	August 24, 2012	The Great Canadian Rebellion	Regina, Saskatchewan	1	60		
19	The Bromantics (Cannonball Kelly (4) and Mike McSugar)	November 24, 2012	Angels and Demons	Regina, Saskatchewan	1	185		
20	The Best Tag Team in the Prairies (Dixie Dragon (4) and Brett Evans (2))	April 26, 2013	Spring Meltdown	Regina, Saskatchewan	2	119	This was a tag team guantlet match that also included The Bromantics (Cannonball Kelly and Mike McSugar), Shanghai Knights (Jackie Lee and Scott Justice), Brothers in Flight (Cam!!ikaze and Eclipse), Inteli-Gents (Bucky McGraw and Jeff Tyler), and The Convicts (Convict 00019 and Convict 006).	
21	The Rambunctious Boys (Thryllin' Dylan (2) and Dice Steele (2))	August 23, 2013	Blood Wars Tour - Night 3	Regina, Saskatchewan	1	245		
22	Mentallo and Jeff Tyler (4)	April 24, 2014	Spring Meltdown	Regina, Saskatchewan	1	105	This was a three-way tag team match that also included The Graves Twins (Samael Graves and Titus Graves)	
23	The Rambunctious Boys (Thryllin' Dylan (3) and Dice Steele (3))	August 7, 2014	Tour De Rumble - Night 6	Regina, Saskatchewan	2	78		
24	Mentallo (2) and Jeff Tyler (5)	October 24, 2014	Monster Brawl	Regina, Saskatchewan	2	183		
25	Team Flex Appeal (Michael Allen Richard Clark and Mike McSugar (2))	April 24, 2015	Spring Meltdown	Regina, Saskatchewan	1	231		
26	The Brotherhood (Dixie Dragon (5) and Jacob Creed)	December 11, 2015	King's Challenge VI	Regina, Saskatchewan	1	168	This was a tables match.	
27	The World Class Renegades (Ace Riviera and Shaun Moore)	May 27, 2016	Battle Arts III	Saskatoon, Saskatchewan	1	155		
28	Los Rudos (Dice Steele (4) and El Asesino)	October 29, 2016	Gruesome Twosome	Saskatoon, Saskatchewan	1	155	This was a special attraction during intermission of a Saskatoon Roller Derby League event.	
29	The World Class Renegades (Ace Riviera and Shaun Moore)	November 18, 2016	Hostile Games	Regina, Saskatchewan	2	266		
—	Vacated	August 11, 2017	Pile O'Bones Rumble XXII	Regina, Saskatchewan	—	—	The World Class Renegades were stripped of the titles.	
30	Los Rudos (Dice Steele (5) and El Asesino (2))	December 15, 2017	King's Challenge VIII	Regina, Saskatchewan	2	69	Los Rudos defeated the World Class Renegades in the finals of the Kings Challenge tournament to win the vacant titles.	
31	Death by Chocolate (Fil Deadly and Kid Chocolate)	February 22, 2018	HIW Wildside Destruction Theory	Saskatoon, Saskatchewan	1	86	This was a No Disqualification match. New titles belts were unveiled prior to the match.	
32	Western Lions (Michael Richard Blais and Brandon Van Danielson)	May 19, 2018	Battle Arts V	Saskatoon, Saskatchewan	1	160		
33	Team Flex Appeal; Michael Allen Richard (2) Clark and Mike McSugar (3)	October 26, 2018	Devil's Night - Halloween Show	Saskatoon, Saskatchewan	2	364	It was a Fans Bring the Weapons match.	
—	Deactivated	October 25, 2019	Monster Brawl VI	Regina, Saskatchewan	—	—	Monster Brawl VI was the final show as the company ceased operations with Canadian Wrestling's Elite having acquired all of HIW's assets.	

== Combined reigns ==
Key
<1	Reign was less than one day

=== By team ===
Rank	Wrestler	No. of reigns	Combined days
1	Team Flex Appeal (Mike McSugar and Michael Allen Richard Clark)	2	595
2	The World Class Renegades (Ace Riviera and Shaun Moore)	2	421
3	The Best Tag Team in the Prairies (Dixie Dragon and Brett Evans)	2	327
4	The Rambunctious Boys (Thryllin' Dylan and Dice Steele)	2	323
5	Billy Bones and Bull Bodnar	1	322
6	Mentallo and Jeff Tyler	2	286
7	Bucky McGraw and Mike Posey	1	260
8	Intelli-Gents (Jeff Tyler and Bucky McGraw)	2	238
9	High Maintenance (Wavell Starr and Plum Loco)	1	224
10	Damange Inc. (Dice Steel and Crash Crimson)	1	209
11	Thryllin' Dylan and Screaming Eagle	1	185
12	The Brotherhood (Dixie Dragon and Jacob Creed)	1	168
13	Dixie Dragon and Billy Bones	2	160
13	Western Lions (Michael Richard Blais and Brandon Van Danielson)	1	160
15	The Bromantics (Cannonball Kelly and Mike McSugar)	1	151
16	Titan Tower and Matt the Ring Boy	1	147
17	Principal Pound and Todd Myers	1	140
18	Principal Pound and Big Daddy Kash	1	98
19	Jumpin' Joe and Robbie Gamble	1	94
20	Dogs of War (Cannonball Kelly and Sgt. Sadistic)	1	91
21	Los Rudos (Dice Steele and El Asesino)	2	88
22	Death by Chocolate (Fil Deadly and Kid Chocolate)	1	86
23	Bad Influence (Rex Roberts and Cannonball Kelly)	1	63
23	Jeff Tyler and Jumpin' Joe	1	63
25	Jumpin' Joe and Cannonball Kelly	1	1

=== By wrestler ===
Rank	Wrestler	No. of reigns	Combined days
1	Mike McSugar	3	780
2	Dixie Dragon	5	655
3	Dice Steele	5	620
4	Michael Allen Richard Clark	2	595
5	Jeff Tyler	5	587
6	Dylan Robson / Thryllin' Dylan	3	507
7	Bucky McGraw	3	498
8	Billy Bones	3	482
9	Ace Riviera	2	421
9	Shaun Moore	2	421
11	Bull Bodnar	1	322
12	Cannonball Kelly	3	306
13	Mentallo	1	286
14	Mike Posey	1	260
15	Principal Pound	2	238
16	Wavell Starr	1	224
16	Plum Loco	1	224
18	Crash Crimson	1	209
19	Michael Richard Blais	1	160
19	Brandon Van Danielson	1	160
21	Titan Tower	1	147
21	Matt the Ring Boy	1	147
23	Todd Myers	1	140
24	Big Daddy Kash	1	98
25	Jumpin' Joe	2	95
26	Robbie Gamble	1	94
27	Rex Roberts	1	63
28	El Asesino	2	88
29	Fil Deadly	1	86
29	Kid Chocolate	1	86
