= Cauliflower Alley Club =

Professional wrestling fraternal organization

- CAC logo
- Formation: 1967
- Type: Professional wrestling 501(c)(3)
- Headquarters: 13900 CR 455 Suite 107-379 Clermont, Florida, U.S.
- President: Brian Blair
- Key people: Executive & Advisory Board: Brian Blair President & CEO; Rich Ingling EVP & Treasurer; Royal Duncan Secretary & "The Ear" Publisher; Ron Hutchison Canadian Director, Reunion Seminar & Website Administrator; Darla Staggs Benevolent Coordinator; Bruce Tharpe Attorney and Legal Counsel; Dan Murphy Vendor Room/Reunion Program Ad Sales & Advisory Board Chair; Vance Nevada "The Ear" Editor; Social Media Administrator; Herb Simmons Benevolent Outreach Ambassador
- Publication: The Ear
- Website: http://www.caulifloweralleyclub.org/

The Cauliflower Alley Club is a non-profit fraternal organization, which includes a newsletter and website, comprising both retired and active professional wrestlers and boxers in North America.

Established in 1965 by Mike Mazurki and Art Abrams, the organization hosts an annual reunion dinner which has traditionally been attended by celebrities and other professional athletes. Several historical Hollywood locations have been home to the reunion banquets such as the Masquer's Club, the Roosevelt Hotel and the Old Spaghetti Factory as well as The Riviera and the RMS Queen Mary.

Its registered symbol is a solid silver mold of Mazurki’s left ear, which was afflicted by cauliflower ear, a common permanent injury among athletes who compete in violent contact sports, one also pictured in its club logo, and its newsletter is accordingly named The EAR.

== History ==
The Cauliflower Alley Club was founded in 1965 by Mike Mazurki as a fraternal organization of professional wrestlers, boxers, and actors. The first annual reunion dinner was held at the Baron's Castle Buffet Restaurant in Los Angeles, California. The Club also presents numerous awards annually at the reunion dinner.

Several prominent former professional wrestlers have been president of the club, including Red Bastien, Nick Bockwinkel, and the current president, Brian Blair. The Club has a "benevolent fund which helps people from the wrestling business in a time of need." Proceeds are raised for the fund during the annual reunion weekend.

== Awards ==
=== 2020s ===
Award	Year	Recipient(s)	Nationality	Ref.
Active awards
Courage Award	2021	Jim Valley and Stuart Kemp	(United States)	
Courage Award	2022	Joyce Grable	(United States)	
Courage Award	2023	Patricia Summerland	(United States)	
Courage Award	2024	Black Bart	(United States)	
Courage Award	2025	Chris Bey and Joel Goodhart	(United States)	
Independent Wrestling Award	2023	Riea Von Slasher	(Canada)	
Independent Wrestling Award	2024	Gary Jackson	(United States)	
Independent Wrestling Award	2025	Steve Rivers	(United States)	
International Award	2025	Abdullah the Butcher	(Canada)	
International Award	2026	Dan Spivey	(United States)	
Iron Mike Mazurki Award	2021	Alundra Blayze	(United States)	
Iron Mike Mazurki Award	2022	John Bradshaw Layfield	(United States)	
Iron Mike Mazurki Award	2023	CM Punk	(United States)	
Iron Mike Mazurki Award	2024	Sting	(United States)	
Iron Mike Mazurki Award	2025	Mick Foley	(United States)	
Iron Mike Mazurki Award	2026	Ric Flair	(United States)	
James C. Melby Historian Award	2021	Greg Oliver	(Canada)	
James C. Melby Historian Award	2023	Koji Miyamoto	(Japan)	
James C. Melby Historian Award	2025	Bertrand Hébert and Pat Laprade	(Canada)	
James C. Melby Historian Award	2026	Dan Murphy	(United States)	
Jim Ross Announcer Award	2024	Jim Ross	(United States)	
Jim Ross Announcer Award	2026	Gary Michael Cappetta	(United States)	
Karl Lauer Independent Promoter Award	2025	Herb Simmons	(United States)	
Legends Legacy Award	2026	Tony Atlas	(United States)	
Lou Thesz/Art Abrams Lifetime Achievement Award	2021	Rob Van Dam	(United States)	
Lou Thesz/Art Abrams Lifetime Achievement Award	2023	Ron Simmons	(United States)	
Lou Thesz/Art Abrams Lifetime Achievement Award	2025	Natalya Neidhart	(Canada) / (United States)	
Lou Thesz/Art Abrams Lifetime Achievement Award	2026	Bill Apter	(United States)	
Lou Thesz/Art Abrams Lifetime Achievement Award	2026	Bret Hart	(Canada) / (United States)	
Lucha Libre Award	2021	Rey Mysterio	(United States) / (Mexico)	
Lucha Libre Award	2022	Konnan	(Cuba) / (United States)	
Lucha Libre Award	2023	Damian 666	(Mexico)	
Lucha Libre Award	2024	Negro Casas	(Mexico)	
Lucha Libre Award	2025	El Fantasma	(Mexico)	
Lucha Libre Award	2026	Psychosis	(Mexico)	
Men's Wrestling Award	2021	Ricky Santana	(United States)	
Men's Wrestling Award	2021	Thunderbolt Patterson	(United States)	
Men's Wrestling Award	2022	Kevin Sullivan	(United States)	
Men's Wrestling Award	2022	Tommy Rich	(United States)	
Men's Wrestling Award	2023	Joe Malenko	(United States)	
Men's Wrestling Award	2023	Koko B. Ware	(United States)	
Men's Wrestling Award	2025	Bob Orton Jr.	(United States)	
Men's Wrestling Award	2026	Bobby Bass	(Canada)	
The Mick Foley Philanthropy Award	2025	Mick Foley	(United States)	
Posthumous Award	2021	Jim Londos	(Greece) / (United States)	
Posthumous Award	2022	Christine "Teeny" Jarrett	(United States)	
Posthumous Award	2023	Killer Karl Kox	(United States)	
Posthumous Award	2025	Harley Race	(United States)	
Red Bastien Friendship Award	2025	Wayne Palmer	(United States)	
Ron Hutchison Trainers Award	2025	Dr. Tom Prichard	(United States)	
Ron Hutchison Trainers Award	2026	Rip Rogers	(United States)	
Tag Team Award	2021	The Road Warriors (Hawk and Animal) with Paul Ellering	(United States)	
Tag Team Award	2022	Rock 'n' Roll Express (Ricky Morton and Robert Gibson)	(United States)	
Tag Team Award	2023	The Nasty Boys (Brian Knobbs and Jerry Sags)	(United States)	
Tag Team Award	2025	The Bushwhackers (Butch Miller and Luke Williams)	(New Zealand)	
Tag Team Award	2026	The Glamour Girls (Judy Martin and Leilani Kai)	(United States)	
Women's Wrestling Award	2021	Jazz	(United States)	
Women's Wrestling Award	2022	Jacqueline Moore	(United States)	
Women's Wrestling Award	2023	Mickie James	(United States)	
Women's Wrestling Award	2024	Allison Danger	(Canada)	
Women's Wrestling Award	2025	Jazz (2)	(United States)	

Award	Year	Recipient(s)	Nationality	Ref.
Defunct awards
Charlie Smith Referee Award	2021	Art Williams	(United States)	
Charlie Smith Referee Award	2022	Billy Silverman	(United States)	
Charlie Smith Referee Award	2023	Kevin Jefferies	(Canada)	
President’s Award	2022	Jerry Lawler	(United States)	
REEL Award	2023	Al Burke	(United States)	
REEL Award	2024	Todd Bridges	(United States)	
Rising Star Award	2021	Brian Pillman Jr.	(United States)	
Rising Star Award	2021	Maddison Miles	(Canada)	
Rising Star Award	2022	Maddison Miles	(Canada)	

=== 2010s ===
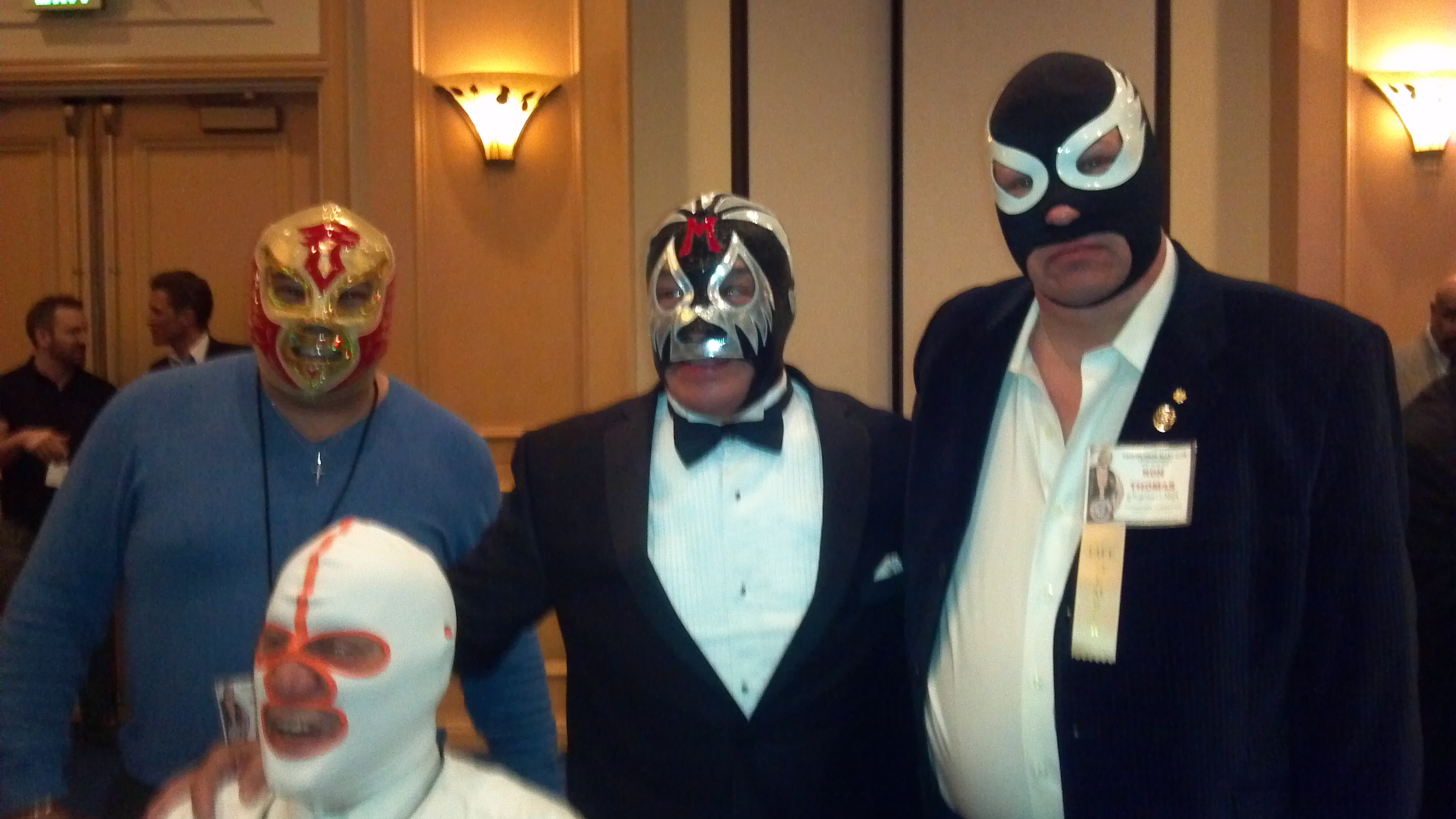
(Left to right) Chicano Flame, The Destroyer (front), Mil Mascaras and Nighthawk in Las Vegas at the 2012 Cauliflower Alley Club reunion.

Award	Year	Recipient(s)	Nationality	Ref.
Iron Mike Mazurki Award	2010	Ted DiBiase	(United States)	
Iron Mike Mazurki Award	2011	Sgt. Slaughter	(United States)	
Iron Mike Mazurki Award	2012	"Stone Cold" Steve Austin	(United States)	
Iron Mike Mazurki Award	2013	"Russian Bear" Ivan Koloff	(Quebec)	
Iron Mike Mazurki Award	2014	Terry Taylor	(United States)	
Iron Mike Mazurki Award	2015	Larry "The Axe" Hennig	(United States)	
Iron Mike Mazurki Award	2016	Trish Stratus	(Canada)	
Iron Mike Mazurki Award	2017	Tully Blanchard	(United States)	
Iron Mike Mazurki Award	2018	Baron von Raschke	(United States)	
Iron Mike Mazurki Award	2019	Mark Henry	(United States)	
Lou Thesz/Art Abrams Lifetime Achievement Award	2010	Dan Severn	(United States)	
Lou Thesz/Art Abrams Lifetime Achievement Award	2010	Jim Ross	(United States)	
Lou Thesz/Art Abrams Lifetime Achievement Award	2011	Rick Martel	(Quebec)	
Lou Thesz/Art Abrams Lifetime Achievement Award	2011	Mick Foley	(United States)	
Lou Thesz/Art Abrams Lifetime Achievement Award	2012	Ricky Steamboat	(United States)	
Lou Thesz/Art Abrams Lifetime Achievement Award	2012	Wendi Richter	(United States)	
Lou Thesz/Art Abrams Lifetime Achievement Award	2013	Bill Moody	(United States)	
Lou Thesz/Art Abrams Lifetime Achievement Award	2014	Michael P.S. Hayes	(United States)	
Lou Thesz/Art Abrams Lifetime Achievement Award	2015	Jerry Brisco	(United States)	
Lou Thesz/Art Abrams Lifetime Achievement Award	2016	Arn Anderson	(United States)	
Lou Thesz/Art Abrams Lifetime Achievement Award	2017	Kevin Von Erich	(United States)	
Lou Thesz/Art Abrams Lifetime Achievement Award	2018	Shawn Michaels	(United States)	
Lou Thesz/Art Abrams Lifetime Achievement Award	2019	Dory Funk Jr.	(United States)	
Lou Thesz/Art Abrams Lifetime Achievement Award	2019	Tony Vellano	(United States)	
Men's Wrestling Award	2010	Dean Higuchi	(United States)	
Men's Wrestling Award	2010	Rip Hawk	(United States)	
Men's Wrestling Award	2010	Roger Kirby	(United States)	
Men's Wrestling Award	2011	The Honky Tonk Man	(United States)	
Men's Wrestling Award	2011	Dan Kroffat	(Canada)	
Men's Wrestling Award	2011	Alex Knight	(United States)	
Men's Wrestling Award	2012	Michelle Starr	(United States)	
Men's Wrestling Award	2012	Mike Webster	(United States)	
Men's Wrestling Award	2012	Bill DeMott	(United States)	
Men's Wrestling Award	2013	Jake Roberts	(United States)	
Men's Wrestling Award	2013	Matt Riviera	(United States)	
Men's Wrestling Award	2013	Adam Copeland (unable to attend in 2011 due to an injury)	(Canada)	
Men's Wrestling Award	2014	Dan "Short Sleeve" Sampson	(United States)	
Men's Wrestling Award	2014	Adam Pearce	(United States)	
Men's Wrestling Award	2014	Buddha Khan	(United States)	
Men's Wrestling Award	2014	John Cozman	(United States)	
Men's Wrestling Award	2015	Diamond Dallas Page	(United States)	
Men's Wrestling Award	2015	Christopher Daniels	(United States)	
Men's Wrestling Award	2015	Sinn Bodhi	(Canada)	
Men's Wrestling Award	2015	The Almighty Sheik	(United States)	
Men's Wrestling Award	2015	Len Denton	(United States)	
Men's Wrestling Award	2016	Paul Orndorff	(United States)	
Men's Wrestling Award	2016	Ken Patera	(United States)	
Men's Wrestling Award	2017	Kahagas	(Japan)	
Men's Wrestling Award	2017	Cuban Assassin	(Cuba)	
Men's Wrestling Award	2018	Alexis Smirnoff	(Quebec)	
Men's Wrestling Award	2018	Greg Valentine	(United States)	
Men's Wrestling Award	2018	Tony Storm	(United States)	
Men's Wrestling Award	2019	"Dr. D" David Schultz	(United States)	
Women's Wrestling Award	2010	Joyce Grable	(United States)	
Women's Wrestling Award	2011	Awesome Kong	(United States)	
Women's Wrestling Award	2011	Darling Dagmar	(United States)	
Women's Wrestling Award	2011	Rockin' Robin	(United States)	
Women's Wrestling Award	2012	Judy Martin	(United States)	
Women's Wrestling Award	2012	"Ivory" Lisa Moretti	(United States)	
Women's Wrestling Award	2013	Molly Holly	(United States)	
Women's Wrestling Award	2013	Sandy Partlow	(United States)	
Women's Wrestling Award	2014	Melissa Anderson	(United States)	
Women's Wrestling Award	2014	Debi Pelletier	(United States)	
Women's Wrestling Award	2015	Beth Phoenix	(United States)	
Women's Wrestling Award	2015	Gail Kim	(Canada)	
Women's Wrestling Award	2015	Lisa Marie Varon	(United States)	
Women's Wrestling Award	2015	Malia Hosaka	(United States)	
Women's Wrestling Award	2017	Gorgeous Ladies of Wrestling	(United States)	
Women's Wrestling Award	2018	Santana Garrett	(United States)	
Women's Wrestling Award	2018	Princess Victoria	(United States)	
Women's Wrestling Award	2019	Bambi	(United States)	
Jason Sanderson Humanitarian Award	2010	Yvonne Melcher	(United States)	
Jason Sanderson Humanitarian Award	2012	Al Burke	(United States)	
Jason Sanderson Humanitarian Award	2013	Ken Jugan	(United States)	
Jason Sanderson Humanitarian Award	2014	Sean Dunster	(United States)	
Jason Sanderson Humanitarian Award	2015	Diamond Dallas Page	(United States)	
Jason Sanderson Humanitarian Award	2016	Sue Aitchison	(United States)	
Red Bastien Friendship Award	2010	Vince Fahey	(United States)	
Red Bastien Friendship Award	2011	Darla Taylor Staggs	(United States)	
Red Bastien Friendship Award	2012	Brian Westcott	(United States)	
Red Bastien Friendship Award	2014	John Arthur Lowe	(United States)	
Lucha Libre Award	2018	Blue Demon Jr.	(Mexico)	
Tag Team Award	2015	Demolition (Bill Eadie and Barry Darsow)	(United States)	
Tag Team Award	2016	High Flyers (Greg Gagne and Jim Brunzell)	(United States)	
Tag Team Award	2018	Harlem Heat (Booker T and Stevie Ray)	(United States)	
Tag Team Award	2019	Faces of Fear (Haku & The Barbarian)	(Tonga)	
Rising Star Award/Future Legend Award	2010	Oliver John	(United States)	
Rising Star Award/Future Legend Award	2011	Kyle Sebastian	(Canada)	
Rising Star Award/Future Legend Award	2012	Kyle Matthews	(United States)	
Rising Star Award/Future Legend Award	2013	Bobby Sharp	(Canada)	
Rising Star Award/Future Legend Award	2014	Santana Garrett	(United States)	
Rising Star Award/Future Legend Award	2015	Wes Brisco	(United States)	
Rising Star Award/Future Legend Award	2018	Kevin Kross	(United States)	
James C. Melby Historian Award	2010	Vance Nevada	(Canada)	
James C. Melby Historian Award	2011	Tom Burke	(United States)	
James C. Melby Historian Award	2013	George Schire	(United States)	
James C. Melby Historian Award	2015	Dennis Brent	(United States)	
James C. Melby Historian Award	2017	Dave Meltzer	(United States)	
James C. Melby Historian Award	2018	Don Luce	(United States)	
James C. Melby Historian Award	2019	Mike Rodgers	(United States)	
Charlie Smith Referee’s Award	2016	James Beard	(United States)	
Charlie Smith Referee’s Award	2017	Bobby Simmons	(United States)	
Charlie Smith Referee’s Award	2018	Mickie Henson	(United States)	
Charlie Smith Referee’s Award	2019	Scrappy McGowan	(United States)	
Posthumous Award	2010	Lee Fields	(United States)	
Posthumous Award	2010	George "Scrap Iron" Gadaski	(United States)	
Posthumous Award	2011	Michel Martel	(Quebec)	
Posthumous Award	2015	Bruiser Brody	(United States)	
Posthumous Award	2018	Roy McClarty	(Canada)	
Posthumous Award	2019	Larry Matysik	(United States)	
REEL Award	2010	Magic Schwarz	(United States)	
REEL Award	2012	Dan Haggerty	(United States)	
REEL Award	2015	Terry Funk	(United States)	
REEL Award	2016	Pepper Martin	(Canada) / (United States)	
Golden Ear Award	2010	Tom Andrew	(United States)	
Golden Ear Award	2013	David Cantu	(United States)	
Golden Ear Award	2014	Jesse Hernandez	(United States)	
Manager's Award	2011	Bruno Lauer	(United States)	
Manager's Award	2015	Jimmy Hart	(United States)	
Announcer’s Award	2012	Bill Kersten	(United States)	
Announcer’s Award	2016	Lance Russell	(United States)	
Family Award	2011	Gilbert Family (Tommy and sons Doug & Eddie)	(United States)	
Family Award	2015	Romero Family (Ricky and sons Jay, Chris & Mark)	(United States)	
Trainer’s Award	2014	Ron Hutchison	(Canada)	
International Award	2010	Pat Barrett	(Republic of Ireland)	
International Award	2011	Pat Barrett	(Republic of Ireland)	
Husband and Wife Award	2014	Beau James and Misty James	(United States)	

=== 2000s ===
Award	Year	Recipient(s)	Nationality	Ref.
Iron Mike Mazurki Award	2000	Ray "Thunder" Stern	(United States)	
Iron Mike Mazurki Award	2001	Stu Hart	(Canada)	
Iron Mike Mazurki Award	2002	Walter "Killer" Kowalski	(Canada)	
Iron Mike Mazurki Award	2003	Maurice "Mad Dog" Vachon	(Quebec)	
Iron Mike Mazurki Award	2004	Bobby "The Brain" Heenan	(United States)	
Iron Mike Mazurki Award	2005	Terry Funk	(United States)	
Iron Mike Mazurki Award	2006	Harley Race	(United States)	
Iron Mike Mazurki Award	2007	Don Leo Jonathan	(United States) / (Canada)	
Iron Mike Mazurki Award	2008	Bret Hart	(Canada)	
Iron Mike Mazurki Award	2009	Nick Bockwinkel	(United States)	
Lou Thesz/Art Abrams Lifetime Achievement Award	2000	Fr. Bill Olivas	(United States)	
Lou Thesz/Art Abrams Lifetime Achievement Award	2001	Ted Lewin	(United States)	
Lou Thesz/Art Abrams Lifetime Achievement Award	2002	Mike Chapman	(Australia)	
Lou Thesz/Art Abrams Lifetime Achievement Award	2003	Angelo Savoldi	(Italy) / (United States)	
Lou Thesz/Art Abrams Lifetime Achievement Award	2004	Antonio Inoki	(Japan)	
Lou Thesz/Art Abrams Lifetime Achievement Award	2004	Danny Hodge	(United States)	
Lou Thesz/Art Abrams Lifetime Achievement Award	2005	Jack Brisco	(United States)	
Lou Thesz/Art Abrams Lifetime Achievement Award	2005	Les Thatcher	(United States)	
Lou Thesz/Art Abrams Lifetime Achievement Award	2006	Verne Gagne	(United States)	
Lou Thesz/Art Abrams Lifetime Achievement Award	2006	Eddie Sharkey	(United States)	
Lou Thesz/Art Abrams Lifetime Achievement Award	2007	Danny Hodge	(United States)	
Lou Thesz/Art Abrams Lifetime Achievement Award	2007	Bob Geigel	(United States)	
Lou Thesz/Art Abrams Lifetime Achievement Award	2008	Steve Williams	(United States)	
Lou Thesz/Art Abrams Lifetime Achievement Award	2008	Pat Patterson	(Quebec) / (United States)	
Lou Thesz/Art Abrams Lifetime Achievement Award	2009	Bob Roop	(United States)	
Lou Thesz/Art Abrams Lifetime Achievement Award	2009	Reggie Parks	(Canada)	
Men's Wrestling Award	2008	Haruka Eigen	(Japan)	
Men's Wrestling Award	2008	Ronnie Garvin	(Quebec)	
Men's Wrestling Award	2008	The Wrestling Guerreros	(Mexico) / (United States)	
Men's Wrestling Award	2008	Paul "Butcher" Vachon	(Quebec)	
Men's Wrestling Award	2009	The Cormier Family	(Canada)	
Men's Wrestling Award	2009	Art Crews	(United States)	
Men's Wrestling Award	2009	Akio Sato	(Japan)	
Men's Wrestling Award	2009	Bill Sky	(United States)	
Women's Wrestling Award	2008	Betty Niccoli	(United States)	
Women's Wrestling Award	2009	Princess Jasmine	(United States)	
Women's Wrestling Award	2009	Luna Vachon	(United States) / (Canada)	
Red Bastien Friendship Award	2008	Joyce Paustian	(United States)	
Red Bastien Friendship Award	2009	Shuhei Aoki	(Japan)	
Future Legend Award	2000	Kurt Angle	(United States)	
Future Legend Award	2001	Donovan Morgan	(United States)	
Future Legend Award	2002	Chris Benoit	(Canada) / (United States)	
Future Legend Award	2003	Steve Fender	(United States)	
Future Legend Award	2004	"Cheerleader" Melissa Anderson	(United States)	
Future Legend Award	2005	Frankie Kazarian	(United States)	
Future Legend Award	2006	Mariko Yoshida	(Japan)	
Future Legend Award	2007	Takeshi Morishima	(Japan)	
Future Legend Award	2008	Ricky Landell	(United States)	
Future Legend Award	2009	Trevor Murdoch	(United States)	
James C. Melby Historian Award	2008	Scott Teal	(United States)	
James C. Melby Historian Award	2009	Stephen Yohe	(United States)	
Posthumous Award	2002	Nell Stewart	(United States)	
Posthumous Award	2002	Hercules Cortez	(Spain)	
Posthumous Award	2003	Rhonda Singh	(Canada)	
Posthumous Award	2004	Wild Bull Curry	(United States)	
Posthumous Award	2006	Bobby Shane	(United States)	
Posthumous Award	2006	Vivian Vachon	(Quebec)	
Posthumous Award	2007	Yukon Eric	(United States)	
Posthumous Award	2007	Betty Jo Hawkins	(United States)	
Posthumous Award	2008	Orville Brown	(United States)	
Posthumous Award	2009	George Gordienko	(Canada)	
Posthumous Award	2009	Eddie Sullivan	(United States)	
REEL Award	2000	Stan Shaw	(United States)	
REEL Award	2000	Tommy "Butch" Bond	(United States)	
REEL Award	2000	Joe Don Baker	(United States)	
REEL Award	2000	Joe Roselius	(United States)	
REEL Award	2000	Marion Ross	(United States)	
REEL Award	2000	Robert Forster	(United States)	
REEL Award	2001	Roddy Piper	(Canada)	
REEL Award	2001	Mimi Lesseos	(United States)	
REEL Award	2001	Don Stroud	(United States)	
REEL Award	2002	Alan Koss	(United States)	
REEL Award	2007	Rock Riddle	(United States)	
REEL Award	2009	Scott Schwartz	(United States)	
Gulf Coast/CAC Honorees	2000	Sputnik Monroe	(United States)	
Gulf Coast/CAC Honorees	2001	Corsica Joe	(France) / (United States)	
Gulf Coast/CAC Honorees	2001	Sarah Lee	(United States)	
Gulf Coast/CAC Honorees	2002	The Fields Brothers	(United States)	
Gulf Coast/CAC Honorees	2003	Bob Roop	(United States)	
Gulf Coast/CAC Honorees	2004	Don Fargo	(Germany) / (United States)	
Gulf Coast/CAC Honorees	2005	"Exotic" Adrian Sweet	(Wales)	
Gulf Coast/CAC Honorees	2006	Karl Roach	(United States)	
Gulf Coast/CAC Honorees	2006	Skandar Akbar	(United States)	
Martial Arts Honorees	2001	Gokor Chivichyan	(Armenia) / (United States)	
Martial Arts Honorees	2002	Juan Hernandez	(United States)	
Martial Arts Honorees	2006	Mike Martelle	(United States)	
Family Award	2000	The Dusek Brothers Riot Squad (Emil Dusek, Ernie Dusek, Joe Dusek and Rudy Dusek)	(United States)	
Family Award	2005	The Ortons (Barry Orton, Bob Orton and Bob Orton Jr.)	(United States)	
Scholarship Award	2002	Nick Ackerman	(United States)	
Scholarship Award	2007	Frankie Buenafuente	(United States)	
Boxing Honorees	2000	Gene Fullmer	(United States)	
Boxing Honorees	2000	Eddie Futch	(United States)	
Boxing Honorees	2000	Willie Bean	(United States)	
Boxing Honorees	2000	Maurice "Dub" Harris	(United States)	
Boxing Honorees	2000	Andy Price	(United States)	
Boxing Honorees	2000	Russell G. Rodriguez	(United States)	
Boxing Honorees	2001	Richard Sandoval	(United States)	
Boxing Honorees	2001	Cornelius Boza-Edwards	(Uganda)	
Boxing Honorees	2001	Jose Flores	(United States)	
Boxing Honorees	2001	Paul Banke	(United States)	
Other Honorees: (2000) Gene Stanlee, The Crusher, Titi Paris, Ethel Brown, Billy Andersen, Natasha the Hatchet Lady, Beverly Shade, Stan Kowalski, Stan Pulaski and Fritz Von Goering. (2001) Rita Cortez, George Scott, Reggie Parks, Norman Frederick Charles III, Kay Noble, Marie LaVerne, Ann LaVerne, Pampero Firpo, Bill Watts and Jack Laskin. (2002) Ox Baker, B. Brian Blair, Judy Grable, Maria DeLeon, Mr. Wrestling, Jimmy Valiant and Fray Tormenta. (2003) Verne Bottoms, Bill Moody (as Percival Pringle III), Tom Andrews, Buddy Colt, Buddy Roberts, Tito Montez, Bruce Swayze, Moose Morowski and Don Leo Jonathan. (2004) Bill Melby, Billy Darnell, Sandy Parker, "Playboy" Buddy Rose, Ed Wiskoski, Margaret Garcia, George Steele, Baron von Raschke, Ann Casey, Percival Friend, Moondog Ed Moretti, Paul Jones, Lester Welch, Charlie Smith and Omar Atlas. (2005) Ernie Ladd, Kenny Jay, Danielle Colley, Paul Christy, Miss Bunny Love and Sir Oliver Humperdink. (2006) Killer Tim Brooks, Scott Casey, Mil Máscaras, Pepper Martin, and Bill White. (2007) J. J. Dillon, Tito Carreon, Duke Myers, Bob Leonard, Cowboy Bob Kelly, and Laura Martinez.

=== 1990s ===
==== 1999 ====
- Iron Mike Mazurki Award: Jesse "The Body" Ventura
- Art Abrams Lifetime Achievement Award: Dan Gable

Other honorees included Ken Patera, Jack Donovan and Bob Geigel.

==== 1998 ====
- Iron Mike Mazurki Award: Lou Thesz
- Art Abrams Lifetime Achievement Award: William Papas
- Scholarship Award Winners: Billy Pappas

Other honorees included Danny Hodge, Fred Blassie, Dory Funk, Jr. and Dan Severn

==== 1997 ====
- Iron Mike Mazurki Award: Tom Drake
- Art Abrams Lifetime Achievement Award: Penny Banner
- Reel Member Inductees: Elliott Gould, Tommy Sands and Terry Moore
- Boxing Honorees: Don Fraser, Lou Filippo and Robert Salazar

Other honorees included:

- Elizabeth, New Jersey (October 11): Sika Anoa'i, Ted Lewin, Donn Lewin, The Fabulous Moolah, Jimmy Valiant, Jim Cornette, Diamond Lil, The Destroyer, The Dudley Boyz, Devon Storm and Georgiann Makropoulos.
- Studio City, California (March 15): Tony Borne, Don Curtis, Tom Drake, Don Manoukian, Steve Rickard and Jim White.

==== 1996 ====
- Iron Mike Mazurki Award: Dick Beyer
- Scholarship Award Winners: Gordy Morgan and Marty Morgan
- Reel Member Inductees: Lawrence Tierney, Fred Williamson, Denver Pyle, Beverly Garland, Norm Crosby and John T. Smith
- Boxing Honorees: Chuck Wepner

Other honorees included:

- Tampa, Florida (October 26): Angelo Poffo, Bonnie Watson, Judy Glover, Jack & Jerry Brisco, Carl Engstrom, Wahoo McDaniel, Gordon Solie and Molly McShane.
- Elizabeth, New Jersey (October 5): Vince McMahon, Vince McMahon, Sr., Jimmy Snuka and Tammy Lynn Sytch.
- Studio City, California (March 16): Stan Hansen, Nelson Royal, Art Michalik, Stan Stasiak, Larry Zbyszko, Angelo Mosca, Seiji Sakaguchi, Masami Yoshida, Chigusa Nagayo, Bobby Heenan, Baron von Raschke and Antonio Inoki.

==== 1995 ====
- Iron Mike Mazurki Award: Gene LeBell
- Reel Member Inductees: Binnie Barnes, Marie Windsor, Jan Merlin and John Saxton
- Martial Arts Honorees: Benny Urquidez and Mimi Lessos
- Boxing Honorees: Gabriel Ruelas and Rafael Ruelas

Other honorees included:

- Elizabeth, New Jersey (September 30): Angelo Savoldi, Capt. Lou Albano, Abe Coleman, Gloria Barratini, Millie Stafford, Pat Patterson, Johnny Rodz and The Public Enemy.
- Studio City, California (March 8): Tiger Conway, Sr., Leo Garibaldi, Susan Sexton, Dave Levin, Ray Stevens, The Sheik and Buddy Lee.

==== 1994 ====
- Iron Mike Mazurki Award: Vic Christy
- Reel Member Inductees: Harry Carey, Jr.
- Boxing Honorees: Lou Bogash, Joe Graziano, Lou Couture, Jocko V. Ananian, Micky Finn, Tom McNeely, Harol Gomes, Willie Pep, Carmen Basilio and Vincent Pazienza

Other honorees included:

- Springfield, Massachusetts (October 1): Gorilla Monsoon, Pedro Morales, Brittany Brown, Candi Devine, Arnold Skaaland, Jackie Nichols, Karl Von Hess, Ilio DiPaolo and Kitty Adams.
- Studio City, California (March 19): Dick Hutton, Billy Robinson, Stuart McCullum, Al Costello, Peggy Allen, Sherri Martel, Ed Francis and Sue Green.

==== 1993 ====
- Iron Mike Mazurki Award: Hard Boiled Haggerty
- Scholarship Award Winners: Nick Cline and Mike Bresnan
- Reel Member Inductees: John Agar, Guy Madison, John Phillip Law and Will Hutchins.
- Boxing Honorees: Genaro (Chicanito) Hernandez, Zacky Padilla, Oscar De La Hoya, Mike Witowich, Chuck Bodak, Jerry Moore, Petey Servin and Jerry Quarry

Other honorees included Verne Gagne, “Cowboy” Bob Ellis, Kinji Shibuya, Wendi Richter, Barbi Dahl and Peggy Patterson.

==== 1992 ====
- Iron Mike Mazurki Award: Woody Strode
- Reel Member Inductees: Woody Strode
- Boxing Honorees: Clarence Henry, Fabela Chavez, Jimmy Roybal, Jimmy Casino and Dave Maier

Other honorees included Maurice Vachon, Hard Boiled Haggerty, Rey Urbano, Johnny James, Gene Kiniski, Pepper Gomez, Penny Banner, Debbie Combs, Belle Starr, Donna Christantello and Diamond Lil.

== Presidents ==
No.	Portrait	Name (Birth–Death)	Term of office		Country of origin
No.	Portrait	Name (Birth–Death)	Took office	Left office	Country of origin
1		Mike Mazurki (1907–1990)	1965	1990	Austria-Hungary/ United States
2		Archie Moore (1913–1998)	1991	1992	United States
3		Lou Thesz (1916–2002)	1992	2000	United States
4		Red Bastien (1931–2012)	2001	2007	United States
5		Nick Bockwinkel (1934–2015)	2007	2014	United States
6	B._Brian_Blair_NWA_Florida_Heavyweight_Championship_1985	B. Brian Blair (Born 1957)	2014	Incumbent	United States

== See also ==
- List of professional wrestling awards
- List of professional wrestling conventions
