= Karl Von Hess =

American professional wrestler

Personal information
- Born: Frank George Faketty; May 18, 1919 Michigan, United States
- Died: August 12, 2009 (aged 90) United States
- Spouse: Lenore

Professional wrestling career
- Ring name(s): Frank Faggerty; Frank Faketty; Karl Von Hess; Mara Duba
- Billed height: 5 ft 10 in (178 cm)
- Billed weight: 220 lb (100 kg)
- Billed from: Germany
- Trained by: Joe Dusek
- Military service
- Allegiance: United States
- Branch: United States Navy
- Unit: Underwater Demolition Team
- Conflicts: World War II (Pacific Theater)

Karl Von Hess (born Frank George Faketty; May 18, 1919 – August 12, 2009) was an American professional wrestler.

== Early life ==
Faketty was born in Michigan in 1919 to Hungarian immigrants, and raised in Omaha, Nebraska. Von Hess was a lifeguard and swimming teacher before entering the United States Navy in World War II serving aboard the cruiser USS Montpelier in the Underwater Demolition TEAM 5.

== Professional wrestling career ==
After being discharged from the Navy, Faketty worked on the carnival circuit for several years, then worked in various regional wrestling promotions.

In 1955, he was inspired by another wrestler, Kurt Von Poppenheim (of the Pacific Northwest) who had a local "heel" gimmick, and there Von Hess further developed the gimmick of the villain into the wrestling persona of a Nazi sympathizer there being the first to take the gimmick nationwide. In doing this, Von Hess became one of the most hated wrestlers; and fans flocked to the arenas to boo him. He adopted the name of Karl Von Hess, later changing his name legally. Von Hess was so convincing as a "heel" that some fans tried to stab him, burn him, and even shoot at him. Von Hess quickly rose to fame in Vince McMahon Sr's World Wide Wrestling Federation (WWWF), drawing huge crowds wherever he went. In truth, he was reportedly, not a Nazi sympathizer, but used the gimmick to inspire the position of the villainous "heel".

In the early 1960s, Von Hess's gimmick began to wear thin, and he was gradually phased out of the WWWF. He continued to work in various wrestling promotions before quitting the business in the late 1960s.

== Later life and death ==
After wrestling, Von Hess operated trailer parks, including the Karl-Le trailer park on the Black Horse pike in Egg Harbor Township, New Jersey, and other businesses with his wife Lenore.

Von Hess died on August 12, 2009, of Alzheimer's disease.

== Championships and accomplishments ==
- World Wide Wrestling Association
  - WWWA World Heavyweight Championship (1 time)
- Cauliflower Alley Club
  - Other honoree (1994)
