= Principal Richard Pound =

Canadian professional wrestler (1964 – 2016)

Personal information
- Born: John Cozman; August 28, 1964 Regina, Saskatchewan, Canada
- Died: November 28, 2016 (aged 52) Regina, Saskatchewan, Canada

Professional wrestling career
- Ring name(s): Danny Young; John Cozman; Principal Richard Pound; Richard Pound
- Billed height: 6 ft 0 in (183 cm)
- Billed weight: 240 lb (109 kg)
- Trained by: Archie Gouldie
- Debut: October 29, 1983
- Retired: October 2013

John Cozman (August 28, 1964 – November 28, 2016) was a Canadian professional wrestler and trainer, known by his ring name "Principal" Richard Pound, who competed in North American independent promotions, most notably as a mainstay of Stampede Wrestling during the 1980s and late 1990s.

== Professional wrestling career ==
Born in Regina, Saskatchewan, Cozman became a fan of professional wrestling and often attended local house shows with his father growing up. Interested in pursuing a career in professional wrestling, he eventually became friends with wrestling photographer Bob Leonard. In 1984, Leonard introduced him to Archie Gouldie and began training under him soon after.

Working with Gouldie during the next six months, he eventually made his professional debut in Stampede Wrestling in early 1985. Touring the Maritimes with Emile Duprée's Grand Prix Wrestling with Gouldie and Leo Burke during the summer as "Danny Young", he also traveled to the United States following Gouldie and Burke to Texas where they wrestled for promoter Joe Blanchard. During the next five years, Cozman would work exclusively for Stampede Wrestling, feuding with Kerry Brown before the promotion closed in 1990.

Retiring from professional wrestling, Cozman worked as a security guard during the next several years although, during 1995, he and Venom would spend three months training wrestlers for the Prairie Wrestling Alliance although the promoter later decided against starting the promotion.

In 1997, he became involved in Wild West Wrestling when the promotion began holding events in Saskatchewan. Later that year, while at a WWF house show in Regina with Bob Leonard, Bruce and Owen Hart, an outline for an in-ring persona was discussed in order to arrange a tryout with the World Wrestling Federation.

Cozman talked with Jim Cornette about entering the WWF, however, Cozman and Bruce Hart continued working on a character outline and later brought in Cozman with the character when he reopened Stampede Wrestling in 1999. Making his debut as "Principal" Richard Pound, Cozman soon began one of the most dominant "heels" in the promotion as leader of the stable The Honor Roll and later defeated Tiger Khan and Greg Pawluk in a three-way match for the Stampede British Commonwealth Mid-Heavyweight Champion in Calgary, Alberta on November 5, 1999. Cozman would become the first champion since the promotion closed in December 1989.

Defeating Tatanka for the Stampede North American Heavyweight Championship in April 2000, he later lost the Stampede British Commonwealth Mid-Heavyweight title to Tiger Mahatma Khan on June 2. The winner of the match would earn a match against Sabu for the Stampede Pacific Heavyweight Championship on June 9.

Cozman would continue defending the Stampede North American title until losing to Bruce Hart on April 13, 2001. The following month, he was backstage with several other Canadian independent wrestlers such as "Wildman" Gary Williams at Monday Night Raw when the WWF toured Alberta in late May. Although he did not compete at the event, he was later invited by the WWF for a tryout match in Tacoma or Seattle, Washington in June.

Appearing at the fourth annual Brian Pillman Memorial Show, he represented Stampede Wrestling in an interpromotional match losing to East Coast Wrestling Association veteran J.R. Ryder in Cincinnati, Ohio in August 2001. In negotiations with Sonny Onoo to tour Great Britain with WrestleXpress in March 2002, he later faced Bruce Hart on the undercard of the Stampede Wrestling 50th Anniversary Show at the Ogden Legion in Calgary, Alberta on May 1, 2003. In late 2004, he also faced Wavell Starr and Zack Mercury while in Renegade Wrestling.

Leaving Stampede Wrestling in 2005, he toured Western Canada with various independent promotions and, in a tag team match with "Taylormade" Todd Myers, Cozman lost to Big Daddy Kash and The Honky Tonk Man in an event for High Impact Wrestling Canada in Regina on March 24, 2006. He again lost to the Honky Tonk Man in a singles match the next night thanks in part to outside interference by Bob Leonard.

The following month, he made a guest appearance along with Emile Dupree, Hubert Gallant, Rick Martel, Butcher Vachon, promoters Al Zinck and Bob Leonard at a "Recognition Night" banquet honoring the Cormier brothers Leo, Yvon, Rudy Kay, and Bobby Kay. The banquet, held in the Cormier's hometown of Memramcook, New Brunswick, was also part of a bluegrass music festival and fundraiser for the local volunteer fire department.

On July 19, after a two-year absence, Cozman returned to High Impact Wrestling Canada at Pile O'Bones Rumble XVIII. He was one of the 30 participants in the Pile O'Bones Rumble itself.

Cozman wrestled his final match in October 2013 in Regina, SK against longtime rival, King Kash. A couple of weeks following the match, Cozman was forced to retire due to illness.

On Friday, October 23, 2015, at High Impact Wrestling's "Monster Brawl" event in Regina, SK, John Cozman was inducted into the HIW Hall of Fame by longtime friend, Bob Leonard.

== Championships and accomplishments ==
- Cauliflower Alley Club
  - Men's Wrestling Award (2014)
- Gold Dragon Wrestling
  - GDW Championship (1 time)
- Stampede Wrestling
  - Stampede North American Heavyweight Championship (1 time)
  - Stampede British Commonwealth Mid-Heavyweight Championship (1 time)
- High Impact Wrestling Canada
  - HIW Central Canadian Heavyweight Championship (4 times)
  - HIW Hall of Fame (2015)
  - HIW Great Plains Provincial Championship (1 time)
  - HIW Tag Team Championship (2 times) - with King Kash (1) and Todd Myers (1)
  - Pile O' Bones Rumble Winner (2009)
