= HIW Wildside Provincial Championship =

Professional wrestling championship

Details
- Promotion: High Impact Wrestling
- Date established: April 24, 2004
- Date retired: October 25, 2019

Other name(s)
- HIW Great Plains Provincial Championship (2004-2013)
Statistics
- First champion(s): Sgt. Sammy Sadistic
- Final champion(s): Rex Roberts
- Most reigns: El Asesino (4 reigns)
- Longest reign: Jumpin' Joe (978 days)
- Shortest reign: Big Daddy Kash, Davey O'Doyle, and Rex Roberts (<1 day)
- Oldest champion: Principal Pound (43 years, 276 days)
- Heaviest champion: Cannonball Kelly (319 lb (145 kg))
- Lightest champion: Ace Riviera (152 lb (69 kg))

The HIW Wildside Provincial Championship was a professional wrestling heavyweight championship in the professional wrestling promotion, High Impact Wrestling Canada. The title was established on April 24, 2004, as the HIW Great Plains Provincial Championship. Michael Allen Richard Clark won the Great Plains Provincial Championship on September 20, 2013, then won the Wildside Provincial Championship on November 22, 2013, in a fatal four-way match to crown the first champion. Upon Clark winning the Wildside Provincial Championship, the Great Plains Provincial Championship was unified with it 24-hours later upon regulation changes. The lineage from the Great Plains Provincial Championship continued to be recognized with both Clark having separate reigns as champion. On October 25, 2019, at Monster Brawl VI, Rex Roberts defeated Bobby Sharp to become the final champion in HIW history. Monster Brawl VI was the HIW's last show as the company ceased operations. Canadian Wrestling's Elite acquired all of HIW's assets.

== Title history ==
=== Names ===
| Name | Time of use |
|---|---|
| HIW Great Plains Provincial Championship | April 24, 2004 - November 23, 2013 |
| HIW Wildside Provincial Championship | November 23, 2013 - October 25, 2019 |

=== Reigns ===
Key
| No. | Overall reign number |
| Reign | Reign number for the specific champion |
| Days | Number of days held |
| <1 | Reign lasted less than a day |

| No. | Champion | Championship change | | | Reign statistics | | Notes | Ref. |
| No. | Champion | Date | Event | Location | Reign | Days | Notes | Ref. |
|---|---|---|---|---|---|---|---|---|
| 1 | Sgt. Sammy Sadistic | April 24, 2004 | House show | Regina, Saskatchewan | 1 | 230 | | |
| 2 | Curtis Knievel | December 10, 2004 | House show | Regina, Saskatchewan | 1 | 70 | | |
| 3 | Bucky McGraw | February 18, 2005 | House show | Regina, Saskatchewan | 1 | 161 | This was a three-way match that included Jeff Tyler. | |
| 4 | Plum Loco | July 29, 2005 | House show | Regina, Saskatchewan | 1 | 84 | This was a three-way match that included Jeff Tyler. | |
| 5 | Mentallo | October 21, 2005 | House show | Regina, Saskatchewan | 1 | 126 | | |
| 6 | Jeff Tyler | February 24, 2006 | House show | Regina, Saskatchewan | 1 | 165 | | |
| 7 | Billy Bones | August 11, 2006 | House show | Regina, Saskatchewan | 1 | 122 | This was a ladder match. | |
| 8 | Thryllin' Dylan | December 8, 2006 | House show | Regina, Saskatchewan | 1 | 168 | | |
| 9 | Billy Bones | May 25, 2007 | House show | Regina, Saskatchewan | 2 | 35 | | |
| 10 | Big Daddy Kash | June 29, 2007 | House show | Regina, Saskatchewan | 1 | <1 | | |
| 11 | Jumpin' Joe | June 29, 2007 | House show | Regina, Saskatchewan | 1 | 217 | Jumpin' Joe immediately challenged for the title. | |
| 12 | Cannonball Kelly | February 1, 2008 | House show | Regina, Saskatchewan | 1 | 119 | This was a Bunkhouse Brawl. | |
| 13 | Principal Pound | May 30, 2008 | House show | Regina, Saskatchewan | 1 | 112 | | |
| 14 | Jumpin' Joe | September 19, 2008 | House show | Regina, Saskatchewan | 2 | 917 | | |
| 15 | The Rockstar | March 25, 2011 | House show | Regina, Saskatchewan | 1 | 0 | | |
| 16 | Matt Levy | June 3, 2011 | House show | Regina, Saskatchewan | 1 | 189 | | |
| 17 | Robbie Gamble | December 9, 2011 | House show | Regina, Saskatchewan | 1 | 222 | | |
| 18 | El Asesino | July 18, 2012 | Rumble Aftermath | Saskatoon, Saskatchewan | 1 | 282 | | |
| 19 | Billy Bones | April 26, 2013 | Spring Meltdown | Regina, Saskatchewan | 3 | 1 | This was a four-way ladder match. | |
| — | Vacated | July 19, 2013 | — | Regina, Saskatchewan | — | — | Title was vacated upon Billy Bones leaving the company. | |
| 20 | Michael Allen Richard Clark | September 20, 2013 | Domination | Regina, Saskatchewan | 1 | 63 | | |
| 21 | Michael Allen Richard Clark | November 22, 2013 | Road to Gold | Saskatoon, Saskatchewan | 2 | 112 | This was a fatal four-way match which also included Ace Riviera, Ethan Hawks, and Rockstar. | |
| — | Unified | November 23, 2013 | — | Regina, Saskatchewan | — | — | Due to Clark holding both titles, HIW made changes to their regulations regarding championships. Subsequently, 24-hours after Clark won the Wildside Provincial Championship, the Great Plains Provincial Championship was unified with it, with the lineage being recognized. Both reigns are separate not a continuation. | |
| 22 | Cam!!ikaze | November 22, 2013 | Art of War | Saskatoon, Saskatchewan | 1 | 146 | This was a fatal four-way match which also included Ace Riviera, Ethan Hawks, and Rockstar. | |
| 23 | El Asesino | August 7, 2014 | Tour De Rumble - Night 6 | Regina, Saskatchewan | 2 | 6 | | |
| 24 | Matt Striker | August 13, 2014 | Tour De Rumble - Night 11 | Saskatoon, Saskatchewan | 1 | 2 | | |
| 25 | El Asesino | August 15, 2014 | Tour De Rumble - Night 13 | Regina, Saskatchewan | 3 | 252 | | |
| — | Vacated | April 24, 2015 | Spring Meltdown | Regina, Saskatchewan | — | — | El Asesino vacated the title due to injury. | |
| 26 | Alexander Prime | April 25, 2015 | Spring Meltdown | Regina, Saskatchewan | 1 | 105 | This was a seven-man scramble match which also included Ace Riviera, Brett Morgan, Bucky McGraw, Dice Steele, Dick Richards, and Rockstar. | |
| 27 | Dice Steele | August 7, 2015 | Pile O'Bones Rumble XX | Regina, Saskatchewan | 1 | 266 | | |
| 28 | El Asesino | April 29, 2016 | Spring Meltdown | Regina, Saskatchewan | 4 | 140 | | |
| 29 | Brett Morgan | September 26, 2016 | Return to War | Regina, Saskatchewan | 1 | 273 | | |
| 30 | Mike McSugar | January 27, 2017 | Reloaded TV tapings | Regina, Saskatchewan | 1 | 91 | | |
| 31 | Brett Morgan | April 28, 2017 | Spring Meltdown | Regina, Saskatchewan | 2 | 60 | This was a three-way tables, ladders, and chairs match. | |
| — | Vacated | June 27, 2017 | — | Saskatoon, Saskatchewan | — | — | Brett Morgan was stripped and suspended by HIW Wildside general manager Dice Steele following his post match actions where he attacked Wavell Starr and Steele at Battle Arts. | |
| 32 | Kat Von Heez | October 26, 2017 | A Wildside Halloween Spectacular | Saskatoon, Saskatchewan | 1 | 183 | | |
| 33 | Bobby Sharp | April 27, 2018 | Spring Meltdown | Regina, Saskatchewan | 1 | 21 | | |
| 34 | Kat Von Heez | May 19, 2018 | Battle Arts V | Saskatoon, Saskatchewan | 2 | 13 | This was a three-way tables, ladders, and chairs match. | |
| 35 | Sheik Shabaz | June 1, 2018 | Anarchy | Saskatoon, Saskatchewan | 1 | 147 | | |
| 36 | Davey O'Doyle | October 26, 2018 | HIW Wildside Devil's Night - Halloween Event | Saskatoon, Saskatchewan | 1 | <1 | | |
| 37 | Ace Riviera | October 26, 2018 | HIW Wildside Devil's Night - Halloween Event | Saskatoon, Saskatchewan | 1 | 294 | Riviera cashed in his briefcase to win the title. | |
| 38 | Bobby Sharp | August 16, 2019 | Friday Night Impact | Regina, Saskatchewan | 2 | 70 | | |
| 39 | Rex Roberts | October 25, 2019 | Monster Brawl VI | Regina, Saskatchewan | 1 | <1 | | |
| — | Deactivated | October 25, 2019 | Monster Brawl VI | Regina, Saskatchewan | — | — | Monster Brawl VI was the final show as the company ceased operations. Canadian Wrestling's Elite acquired all of HIW's assets. | |

== Combined reigns ==
| <1 | Indicates reign was less than one day |

| Rank | Champion | No. of reigns | Combined days |
|---|---|---|---|
| 1 | Jumpin' Joe | 2 | 1,195 |
| 2 | El Asesino | 4 | 693 |
| 3 | Ace Riviera | 1 | 296 |
| 4 | Dice Steel | 1 | 266 |
| 5 | Sgt. Sammy Sadistic | 1 | 250 |
| 6 | Billy Bones | 3 | 238 |
| 7 | Robbie Gamble | 1 | 222 |
| 8 | Kat Von Heez | 1 | 197 |
| 9 | Brett Morgan | 2 | 193 |
| 10 | Matt Levy | 1 | 189 |
| 11 | Michael Allen Richard Clark | 2 | 175 |
| 12 | Jeff Tyler | 1 | 168 |
| 12 | Thryllin' Dylan | 1 | 168 |
| 14 | Bucky McGraw | 1 | 161 |
| 15 | Sheik Shabaz | 1 | 147 |
| 16 | Mentallo | 1 | 126 |
| 17 | Cannonball Kelly | 1 | 119 |
| 18 | Principal Pound | 1 | 112 |
| 19 | Alexander Prime | 1 | 100 |
| 20 | Mike McSugar | 1 | 91 |
| 20 | Bobby Sharp | 2 | 91 |
| 22 | Plum Loco | 1 | 84 |
| 23 | Curtis Knievel | 1 | 70 |
| 24 | The Rockstar | 1 | 9 |
| 25 | Matt Striker | 1 | 2 |
| 26 | Big Daddy Kash | 1 | <1 |
| 26 | Davey O'Doyle | 1 | <1 |
| 26 | Rex Roberts | 1 | <1 |
