= Bob Leonard (wrestling) =

Canadian professional wrestling promoter and historian

- Born: October 16, 1941; Olds, Alberta
- Died: January 9, 2016 (aged 74)
- Occupations: Photographer, ring announcer
- Years active: 1936 – 1989, photography
- Known for: Photographer, writer, wrestling promotor

Bob Leonard (October 16, 1941 – January 9, 2016), was a Canadian professional wrestling promoter, photographer, ring announcer, and author. During his career in the professional wrestling industry he spent three decades as the perennial photographer for Stampede Wrestling.

== Biography ==
Leonard was born in Olds, Alberta but spent most his life in Regina, Saskatchewan.

Referred to by journalist Dave Meltzer as the number one pro wrestling historian of the 70s and 80s he was a multi-tasking employee of Stampede Wrestling who worked on several aspects of the promotion in backstage roles and in many capacities on screen but was most acknowledged for his longtime work as a photographer of matches. He has been credited as having made landmark contributions toward the understanding of professional wrestling.

== Awards and recognitions ==
- Canadian Wrestling Hall of Fame
  - Class of 2005
- Cauliflower Alley Club
  - Men's Wrestling Award (2007)
- High Impact Wrestling Canada
  - HIW Hall of Fame (Class of 2014)
- Stampede Wrestling
  - Stampede Wrestling Hall of Fame (Class of 1995)

== See also ==
- List of Stampede Wrestling alumni
