= CWE Central Canadian Heavyweight Championship =

Professional wrestling championship

Details
- Promotion: Canadian Wrestling's Elite
- Date established: September 2, 2001
- Current champion: Anderson Tyson Moore
- Date won: August 15, 2025

Other names
- WHIP Wrestling Central Canadian Heavyweight Championship (2001-2002); HIW Central Canadian Heavyweight Championship (2002-2019); CWE Central Canadian Heavyweight Championship (2019-present)
Statistics
- First champion: Charley Hayes
- Most reigns: Principal Pound and Rex Roberts (4 times)
- Longest reign: Davey O'Doyle (511 days)
- Shortest reign: Brett Evans (<1 day)
- Oldest champion: Rob Stardom (44 years)
- Youngest champion: Alexander Prime (20 years, 5 months, 15 days)

The CWE Central Canadian Heavyweight Championship is a professional wrestling heavyweight championship in the professional wrestling promotion, Canadian Wrestling's Elite. The championship was first awarded on September 2, 2001, as the World High Impact Pro Wrestling Central Canadian Heavyweight Championship. Charlie Hayes was the inaugural champion having won the title in a gauntlet match. Brett Evans became the final champion under the HIW banner after defeating Tony Novak in the finals a tournament at HIW Monster Brawl VI on October 25, 2019. Monster Brawl was the final show in HIW history. It became a title under CWE banner when they purchased all of High Impact Wrestling's assets and absorbed the company.

As of October 11, 2024, there have been 52 reigns among 34 wrestlers with four vacancies. The inaugural champion was Charley Hayes. Principal Pound and Rex Roberts have the most reigns at four. Big Daddy Kash / King Kash has the longest combined reign at 783 days. Davey O'Doyle has the longest singular reign at 511 days. Brett Evans has the shortest singular reign at less than one day. The youngest champion was Alexander Prime having won it when he was 20-years-old. The oldest champion is Rob Stardom having won it when he was 44-years-old.

The current champion is Anderson Tyson Moore who is in his first reign. He defeated Cam!!ikaze on night 15 of the Ready to Rumble Tour on November 11, 2024.

== Title history ==
As of March 8, 2026.

=== Names ===
Name	Time of use
WHIP Wrestling Central Canadian Heavyweight Championship	September 2, 2001 – Unknown
HIW Central Canadian Heavyweight Championship	Unknown – October 25, 2019
CWE Central Canadian Heavyweight Championship	October 26, 2019 – present

=== Reigns ===
Key
No.	Overall reign number
Reign	Reign number for the specific champion
Days	Number of days held
<1	Reign lasted less than a day
+	Current reign is changing daily

No.	Champion	Championship change			Reign statistics		Notes	Ref.
No.	Champion	Date	Event	Location	Reign	Days	Notes	Ref.
1	Charley Hayes	September 2, 2001	Labour Day Classic	Regina, SK	1	177	Hayes pinned Rex Roberts in a gauntlet match to become the first champion. Event took place at Taylor Field during a CFL game.	
2	Titan Tower	February 26, 2002	House show	Regina, SK	1	56		
3	Charley Hayes	April 23, 2002	House show	Regina, SK	2	95		
4	Rex Roberts	July 27, 2002	Pile O'Bones Rumbles VIII	Regina, SK	1	265		
5	Thryllin' Dylan	January 17, 2004	House show	Regina, SK	1	251		
6	Big Daddy Kash	September 24, 2004	House show	Regina, SK	1	182		
7	Principal Pound	March 25, 2005	House show	Regina, SK	1	75		
8	The Chief	June 8, 2005	House show	Regina, SK	1	72		
9	Principal Pound	August 19, 2005	House show	Regina, SK	2	63		
10	Big Daddy Kash	October 21, 2005	House show	Regina, SK	2	91		
11	Rex Roberts	January 20, 2006	House show	Regina, SK	2	175		
12	Todd Myers	July 14, 2006	House show	Regina, SK	1	112		
—	Vacated	November 3, 2006	House show	Regina, SK	—	—	Vacated for undocumented reasons.	
13	Principal Pound	February 23, 2007	House show	Regina, SK	3	35		
14	Rex Roberts	February 23, 2007	House show	Regina, SK	3	28		
15	Principal Pound	April 27, 2007	House show	Regina, SK	3	336		
16	Dixie Dragon	March 28, 2008	House show	Regina, SK	1	266		
17	Wavell Starr	December 19, 2008	House show	Regina, SK	1	406		
18	Jeff Tyler	January 29, 2010	House show	Regina, SK	1	210		
19	Bucky McGraw	August 27, 2010	House show	Regina, SK	1	35		
20	King Kash	October 1, 2010	House show	Regina, SK	3	509		
21	Jumpin' Joe	February 22, 2012	House show	Regina, SK	1	247		
22	Robbie Gamble	October 26, 2012	House show	Regina, SK	1	406		
23	Rex Roberts	December 6, 2013	Kings Challenge IV	Regina, SK	4	140		
24	Bull Bodnar	April 25, 2014	House show	Regina, SK	1	140		
—	Vacated	September 12, 2014	House show	Regina, SK	—	—	Vacated for undocumented reasons.	
25	Wavell Starr	December 5, 2014	King's Challenge V	Regina, SK	2	140		
26	Robbie Gamble	April 14, 2015	Spring Meltdown	Regina, SK	2	150	This was a three-way match which also included Bobby Sharp.	
27	Cannonball Kelly	September 11, 2015	Domination	Regina, SK	1	91		
28	Bobby Sharp	September 11, 2015	King's Challenge VI	Regina, SK	1	49		
29	Cannonball Kelly	January 29, 2016	The Great Canadian Rebellion	Regina, SK	2	91		
30	Tyler Colton	April 29, 2016	Spring Meltdown	Regina, SK	1	231		
31	Michael Allen Richard Clark	December 16, 2016	King's Challenge VII	Regina, SK	1	133	This was a three-way match which also included Tyler Colton and Mentallo.	
32	Alexander Prime	April 28, 2017	Spring Meltdown	Regina, SK	1	70		
33	Michael Allen Richard Clark	July 7, 2017	War Before the Storm	Regina, SK	2	35	This was a loser leaves HIW street fight.	
34	Jeff Tyler	August 11, 2017	Pile O'Bones Rumble XXII	Regina, SK	2	28		
35	El Asesino	September 8, 2017	Night of the Wild	Saskatoon, SK	1	21		
36	Dixie Dragon	September 29, 2017	Domination	Regina, SK	2	43	Defeated El Asesino and Jeff Tyler in a three-way match.	
37	Michael Allen Richard Clark	November 11, 2017	Hostile Games	Regina, SK	3	34	Defeated Jeff Tyler, Dixie Dragon, and El Asesino in a four-way match.	
38	Jeff Tyler	December 15, 2017	King's Challenge VIII	Regina, SK	3	155		
39	El Asesino	May 19, 2018	Battle Art V	Saskatoon, SK	2	426	This was a mask vs. title match.	
40	Shaun Moore	July 19, 2019	Friday Night Impact	Regina, SK	1	76		
—	Vacated	August 3, 2019	—	Regina, SK	—	—	Title vacated upon Shaun Moore departing from the company.	
41	Brett Evans	October 25, 2019	Monster Brawl VI	Regina, SK	1	<1	Evans defeated Tony Novak in tournament final to become the final champion under the HIW banner.	
—	Vacated	October 25, 2019	Monster Brawl VI	Regina, SK	—	—	HIW ceased operations following the event as CWE purchased their assets and absorbed the company. They would keep the title active under the CWE banner.	
Canadian Wrestling's Elite
42	Davey O'Doyle	February 29, 2020	10th Annual King's Challenge	Regina, SK	1	511	O'Doyle pinned Danny Duggan in a gauntlet match to become the first Central Canadian Heavyweight Champion under the CWE banner. King Kash, Leo London, Thryllin' Dylan, and Beri Grayson were also participants.	
43	Shaun Martens	July 24, 2021	12th Anniversary Tour - Night 8	Weyburn, SK	1	99		
44	Jude Dawkins	October 31, 2021	Rumble to Remember	Winnipeg, MB	1	81		
45	Berat Gorani	January 20, 2022	Final Destination	Grande Prairie, AB	1	287		
46	Davey Boy Smith Jr.	November 3, 2022	Point to Prove Tour - Night 9	Prince Albert, SK	1	1		
47	Danny Duggan	November 4, 2022	Point to Prove Tour - Night 10	Yorkton, SK	1	42		
48	Rob Stardom	December 16, 2022	Super Jobber Cup 2022	Winnipeg, MB	1	266		
49	James Roth	September 8, 2023	Back To School Bash Tour - Night 2	Winnipeg, MB	1	316		
50	Danny Duggan	July 20, 2024	Cruel Summer Tour - Night 22	Winnipeg, MB	2	124		
51	Cam!!ikaze	November 21, 2024	Rumble to Remember Tour - Night 15	Medicine Hat, AB	1	267		
52	Anderson Tyson Moore	August 15, 2025	Cruel Summer - Night 12	Winnipeg, MB	1	205+		

== Combined reigns ==
As of March 8, 2026.

Key
†	Indicates the current champion
<1	Indicates reign was less than one day
+	Indicates combined reign is changing daily

Rank	Champion	No. of reigns	Combined days
1	Big Daddy Kash / King Kash	3	782
2	Charley Hayes	2	637
3	Wavell Starr	2	547
4	Robbie Gamble	2	546
5	Principal Pound	4	519
6	Rex Roberts	4	517
7	Davey O'Doyle	1	511
8	El Asesino	2	447
10	Jeff Tyler	3	393
11	James Roth	1	316
12	Dixie Dragon	2	315
13	Berat Gorani	1	287
14	Cam!!ikaze	1	267
15	Rob Stardom	1	266
16	Thryllin' Dylan	1	251
17	Jumpin' Joe	1	247
18	Tyler Colton	1	231
19	Cannonball Kelly	2	182
20	Michael Allen Richard Clark	2	168
21	Danny Duggan	2	166
22	Bull Bodnar	1	140
23	Todd Myers	1	112
24	Shaun Martens	1	99
25	Jude Dawkins	1	81
26	The Chief	1	72
27	Alexander Prime	1	70
28	Titan Tower	1	56
29	Bobby Sharp	1	49
30	Anderson Tyson Moore †	1	205+
31	Bucky McGraw	1	35
32	Shaun Moore	1	15
33	Davey Boy Smith Jr.	1	1
34	Brett Evans	1	<1
