= High Impact Wrestling =

Professional wrestling promotion

- Acronym: HIW
- Founded: 1998
- Defunct: 2019
- Style: American Wrestling
- Headquarters: Regina, Saskatchewan
- Founder: Charles Pichette
- Owner: Canadian Wrestling's Elite
- Sister: High Impact Wrestling Wildside
- Formerly: World High Impact Pro Wrestling
- Website: http://www.hiwcanada.com

High Impact Wrestling Canada (HIW) was a professional wrestling promotion, based in Regina, Saskatchewan, Canada. Known for its hard hitting "Saskatchewan Style", the HIW roster consisted of nearly 40 regular performers. On January 1, 2019, the company celebrated its 21-year anniversary. This anniversary made High Impact Wrestling one of the oldest continuously active pro-wrestling companies to run in Canada. HIW partnered with Access 7, a TV station in Regina, SK, in January 2014 to begin producing a weekly TV show which aired every Tuesday at 8 pm. The Access television program aired for five consecutive seasons. HIW closed on October 25, 2019, after 21 years of operation. It was announced on September 20, 2019, that the company would be absorbed by Winnipeg based Canadian Wrestling's Elite.

== History ==
=== Early history ===
In 1998, following the demise of the Hardcore Wrestling circuit that ran from 1996 – 1998, wrestler Charley Pichette, opted to open up a pro-wrestling training school which would also run periodic live events. Pichette named the company "World High Impact Pro-Wrestling" or "WHIP Wrestling" for short. Training would take place in an old, rundown building on Quebec Street in Regina, Sk. Original members of the promotion included Pichette (who was then known as Charley Hayes), Todd Myers, Scotty Simms, Crusher Carlson, and Rex Roberts, with all members taking part in the training of young hopefuls. The training school began to pick up steam and added a number of new trainees. After enough local performers had joined and been trained, Pichette rounded out the roster with out of Province talent and ran some of the first WHIP Wrestling events. The first handful of events turned out decent crowds and Pichette continued to expand the roster with new trainees and ran a few live events a year.

At the end of 2003, Pichette decided that the company had grown enough in terms of roster size and fan base that the time had come to begin running regular monthly events in Regina. Monthly events took place at the Saskatchewan Veterans Hall on 12th Avenue in Regina. Pichette would run a matinee afternoon card that was geared towards family and a younger audience, and an evening card which was intended to cater to an older and livelier audience. The low ceiling in the building often hindered performers from being able to utilize top rope maneuvers as part of their arsenal, but the shows were still high energy and the company began to fill the building to capacity during its evening events. Two championship belts were wrestled for during this period, the Central Canadian Heavyweight Championship (which serves as the promotion's top title), and the Great Plains Provincial Title.

=== High Impact Wrestling ===
In 2004, after several months at the Vets Hall, Pichette moved his monthly events to the Saskatchewan Cultural Exchange on 8th Avenue. The new venue was smaller in capacity but a higher ceiling allowed for higher risk moves by the performers. It was at this time that Pichette decided to give the product a fresh look, and began running the company under the name "High Impact Wrestling Regina" or "HIW Regina". Pichette continued to run matinee and evening cards, although the matinee cards often drew few spectators and eventually Pichette decided to do away with the matinee. The "up close and personal" atmosphere at the Exchange became synonymous with the live HIW Regina events, and gave fans a very interactive experience. The Canadian Tag Team titles were added to the list of championships and were originally won by Thryllin’ Dylan and Screaming Eagle in a tag team tournament. Soon, the company was filling the building on a regular basis and the time was coming to find a larger home for the monthly shows.

Pichette settled on a new venue and in 2005 HIW Regina began running monthly events from the Regina German Society Harmonie Club on St. John Street. The new venue was much larger than the previous and looked empty for many events even though the crowd numbers were very similar to those when the company ran at the Exchange. By 2006, the shows were drawing more and more spectators. In March of that year, an event featuring the Honky Tonk Man drew nearly 400 fans, an indoor record for the company at the time. A short lived decision to expand into Saskatoon, Saskatchewan prompted Pichette to briefly run the company as both "HIW Regina" and "HIW Saskatoon" dependent on which city the events were held, but after a disappointing audience in Saskatoon, the idea was put on the shelf. The decision was made to rename the company "High Impact Wrestling Canada" or "HIW Canada" to give the promotion a more "National" feel. Merchandise was produced including T-shirts, tank tops, toques, and even select women's underwear which featured the HIW Canada logo.

The company continued to draw large crowds to the German Club through 2007 and 2008, but the relationship between the club and HIW Canada began to sour. In 2009, despite the fact that the company had sold out 9 straight events at the venue, club management decided to end its business relationship with Pichette and his promotion. During the final event at the German Club in June 2009, veteran performer Big Daddy Kash grabbed the microphone before his match and delivered an infamously scathing rant directed towards the club president who was standing at ringside. Following the end of the relationship with the German Club, Pichette took two months off from running shows to find the company a new venue.

In September 2009, High Impact Wrestling Canada made its debut at the Victoria Club on Victoria Avenue. The Victoria Club was a much smaller venue, and in order to house the larger audiences that filled the German Club, Pichette decided to run a Friday evening card as well as a Saturday evening card in succession. The two cards would feature different matches but would still allow fans who weren't able to see the first show an opportunity to catch an HIW card the same weekend. Fans filled the building for both cards in the first series of weekend events but in the following months this would change. The Friday night events continued to draw good size audiences but smaller crowds would come out for the Saturday night card. Eventually, the Saturday events were scrapped, and HIW Canada would run Friday nights exclusively.

=== Television Program 2010 ===
In 2010, High Impact Wrestling and Access Communications began producing a weekly television program that would air weekly on the Access 7 channel. Live events were split into two halves and two episodes were taped at each monthly event at the Victoria Club in Regina, SK. The episodes would only be available to Regina Access 7 cable subscribers. The program was short lived and was removed from regular scheduling on Access 7 by 2011.

=== Sale of HIW Canada ===
Following the end of the television program, Pichette continued to run moderately successful shows from the Victoria Club through 2011, also touring the northern part of the Province a handful of times throughout the year. In 2012, Pichette expanded the company to tour to the cities of Saskatoon, and Yorkton once a month. He also began touring northern centers more extensively and ran in excess of 35 live events during the course of the year. In December 2012, after nearly 20 years of involvement in professional wrestling, Pichette decided to sell High Impact Wrestling Canada and take a leave from the sport. The company was sold to Mike Roberts, who performs under the name "King Kash". Since taking over the company, Roberts has continued the company's expansion to include several new Saskatchewan centers. HIW Canada continued to run regular live events from the Victoria Club until June 2013, when the company moved to its current home venue in Regina, SK, the Hungarian Club.

=== High Impact Wrestling Wildside Brand / Wildside Division / HIW Wildside Wrestling ===
On June 14, 2013, HIW management announced that a second brand under the "High Impact Wrestling" banner called "HIW Wildside" was to be launched and would begin running live events in the fall of that year. The two brands would run their own event calendar but would co-host the "Big Three" events (Spring MELTDOWN, Pile O' Bones Rumble, and King's Challenge). The Wildside roster would employ a separate roster from the HIW Canada roster and feature a younger mix of up and comers with a handful of veteran performers.

Wildside's first involvement in an HIW event was Pile O' Bones Rumble XVIII in which the new brand co-hosted the annual Rumble event with the HIW Canada brand. The event took place On July 19, 2013, at the Hungarian Club in Regina, SK.

In August 2013, HIW Wildside hosted a portion of the "Blood Wars" Tour, a four-day tour that featured Wildside performers, HIW Canada performers, and Gangrel. The Wildside brand hosted their lone date on the tour on August 24, 2013, at the Western Development Museum in Moose Jaw, SK.

The first HIW Wildside brand event was held at the Victoria Club in Regina, SK on Friday, September 27 and was entitled "The Future Begins". The event was well received and plans to continue hosting regular events were given the go-ahead.

The "Road To Gold" event on November 22, 2013, featured a 4-way match to crown the first ever Wildside Provincial Champion. Performers in the 4-way championship match included Ethan Hawks, Ace Riviera, Rockstar, and then Great Plains Provincial Champion Michael Allen Richard Clark. Ethan Hawks was eliminated first, then the Rockstar, leaving Ace Riviera and Michael Allen Richard Clark. Clark eventually defeated Riviera to become the first champion in Wildside history. The Great Plains Provincial title and the Wildside Provincial title were subsequently unified the following day on November 23, 2013.

The Wildside brand currently runs monthly events at the Western Development Museum in Moose Jaw, SK and periodically in Regina, SK. The Cultural Exchange became the new home venue for Wildside in the Queen City and regular events will be hosted there.

On Saturday, September 20, 2014, HIW Wildside celebrated its one-year anniversary at the "NIGHT OF THE WILD" event at the Western Development Museum in Moose Jaw, SK. The show featured the brand's first ever Ladder Match which pitted Wildside's originals Ethan Hawks and Ace Riviera against one another.

On Thursday, January 21, 2015, the High Impact Wrestling parent office announced that the HIW Canada brand had absorbed the HIW Wildside brand in a move intended to further strengthen the all around product. Coming off the heels of the most successful year in company history, the absorption concept was on the table as a method to add more strength to the legs of High Impact Wrestling's continued expansion throughout Central Canada. It was also announced that despite the fact that Wildside would no longer run as a separate brand, it would now operate as a division within High Impact Wrestling with the Wildside Provincial Championship and its lineage continuing to represent the division.

In December 2016, the HIW office announced that a Wildside brand would be relaunched in May 2017. The new brand would run as a stand-alone brand based in Saskatoon, Saskatchewan, while Regina and Southern Saskatchewan would feature its own brand, the more traditional HIW Canada brand. A talent draft was announced and would take place in early 2017, the draft would include talent both currently employed by High Impact Wrestling at the time and non-HIW contracted talent. The first overall pick by the newly formed Wildside Wrestling office would be "God's Gift to Wrestling" Michael Richard Blais. In a situation that created some controversy, then-Wildside champion Mike McSugar and then-Central Canadian heavyweight champion Michael Allen Richard Clark would be granted split brand contracts because they technically were never drafted and were forced to represent the respective brands of the championships they held. The new brand would present its own events with "Battle Arts" being the centerpiece event of its yearly schedule. The two brands would be jointly featured on the Spring Meltdown and Pile O' Bones Rumble events. HIW Wildside Wrestling ran its first event on May 11, 2017, with an event called "The Arrival". The HIW Wildside brand runs events across the northern portion of Saskatchewan while the HIW Canada brand covers events across the southern portion.

=== Return To Television ===
On January 1, 2014, HIW Canada announced that it would be returning to television in 2014 with a weekly hour-long program on Access 7. The first episodes were taped on January 17, 2014, at an event entitled "Pride & Glory" and began airing on March 4, 2014. The show was well received and wrapped up the taping of its first season on Friday, April 25, 2014. Taping for the second season began on January 30, 2015, and the first episode of the second episode aired on February 10. Tapings for the 5th season wrapped on August 31, 2018. The show aired weekly every Tuesday evening at 8:00 pm with replays on Sunday at 1pm on Access 7 across Saskatchewan, and was also accessible through its On-Demand section.

=== HIW Renegade Wrestling brand extension ===
On Sunday, February 16, 2016, it was announced that High Impact Wrestling and Saskatchewan-based Renegade Wrestling had come to terms on a partnership agreement that will see Renegade Wrestling operate as an extended brand of the High Impact Wrestling parent company. Under the agreement, Renegade Wrestling would be re-branded as "HIW Renegade Wrestling" and would now operate under the High impact Wrestling banner. As an extended brand, the company will continue to run as an independent entity but with the benefit of promotional support from the parent company, as well as continued talent-sharing and a number of other unnamed amenities.

Renegade Wrestling operated independently for a number of years, running periodic live events across Saskatchewan with a focus on aboriginal communities. Renegade Wrestling and High Impact Wrestling had a loose working arrangement for a number of years in which HIW talent would be loaned to Renegade Wrestling for events, but no official agreement had ever been pursued until recently.

The first Renegade Wrestling event under the HIW banner took place on Wednesday, February 24, 2016, at Ochapawace First Nation, Saskatchewan. The event was announced as a High Impact Wrestling event throughout the show but since the event took place before the official agreement had been announced, it was not promoted as an HIW sanctioned event.

This would mark High Impact Wrestling's second foray into brand extension, the first being with the "HIW Wildside" brand that ran from mid-2013 until December 2015 before being absorbed by the parent company and becoming a competitive division within High Impact Wrestling.

=== Internet TV ===
On March 24, 2018, the Wildside brand released the first episode of its show "Wildside TV" on the High Impact Wrestling YouTube channel. The show was well received and new episodes have continued to be released weekly every Saturday morning.

45 episodes of "Wildside TV" were released, with the last episode being aired on February 16, 2019.

The HIW Canada brand announced that it would be launching its own program on the YouTube channel. Tapings for "Friday Night Impact" were expected to begin at the January 18th, 2019 live event in Regina, Saskatchewan and air weekly every Friday evening. No episodes were ever recorded.

=== Closing and absorption by Canadian Wrestling's Elite (CWE) ===
After 21 years of operation The HIW Canada Brand closed after Monster Brawl VI on October 25, 2019. This event featured Mexican professional wrestler Super Crazy. HIW announced on September 20, 2019, that it would be absorbed by Winnipeg Based Canadian Wrestling's Elite.

== Championships and accomplishments ==
Championship	Final champion	Date retired	Location retired
HIW Canadian Grand Championship	King Kash (Note: King Kash was the final champion under the HIW banner. Canadian Wrestling's Elite briefly kept the title active under the CWE banner until it was unified with the Central Canadian Heavyweight Championship on October 31, 2021.)	October 25, 2019	Regina, Saskatchewan
HIW Central Canadian Heavyweight Championship	Brett Evans (Note: Brett Evans was the final champion under the HIW banner. Canadian Wrestling's Elite kept the title active under the CWE banner.)	October 25, 2019	Regina, Saskatchewan
HIW Canadian Tag Team Championship	Team Flex Appeal (Michael Allen Richard Clark and Mike McSugar)	October 25, 2019	Regina, Saskatchewan
HIW Wildside Provincial Championship	Rex Roberts	October 25, 2019	Regina, Saskatchewan
HIW Internet Championship	Wavell Starr	October 25, 2019	Regina, Saskatchewan

Pile O' Bones Rumble Winners
Rumble	Winner	Year
I	Todd Myers	1996
II	Scotty Simms	1997
III	Charley Hayes	1998
IV	Charley Hayes	1999
V	Mentallo	2000
VI	Crusher Carlson	2001
VII	Titan Tower	2002
VIII	Plum Loco	2003
IX	Curtis Knievel	2004
X	Antonio Scorpio Jr.	2005
XI	The Chief	2006
XII	Bucky McGraw	2007
XIII	King Kash	2008
XIV	Principal Pound	2009
XV	Todd Myers	2010
XVI	Robbie Gamble	2011
XVII	Rex Roberts	2012
XVIII	Rex Roberts	2013
XIX	Wavell Starr	2014
XX	Cannonball Kelly	2015
XXI	Michael Allen Richard Clark	2016
XXII	Jeff Tyler	2017
XXIII	Shaun Moore	2018

King's Challenge Winners
Challenge	Winner	Year	Runner-Up
I	King Kash	2010	The Chief
II	King Kash	2011	Bucky McGraw
III	Thryllin' Dylan	2012	Dixie Dragon
IV	Bull Bodnar	2013	Cam!!ikaze
V	Wavell Starr	2014	Robbie Gamble
VI	Bobby Sharp	2015	Cannonball Kelly
VII	Alexander Prime	2016	El Asesino
VIII	Los Rudos (Dice Steele & El Asesino)	2017	The World Class Renegades (Ace Riviera & Shaun Moore)
IX	Michael Richard Blais	2018	Raj Singh, Davey O' Doyle, El Asesino

== HIW Hall of Fame ==
#	Year	Ring name (Real name)^{[a]}	Inducted by	Inducted for	Notes^{[b]}
1	2010	Sgt. Sammy Sadistic	Charles Pichette	Wrestling	Won the HIW Wildside Provincial Championship (1 time)
2	2012	Charles Pichette	King Kash	Promoting and Wrestling	Founder of HIW Canada
3	2013	The Victoria Club	Cathie Cougar	Venue	Original home arena for HIW Canada
4	2013	Crusher Carlsen	King Kash	Wrestling	CWF Heavyweight Championship (1 time), CWF Tag Team Championship (2 times), NWA Canadian Tag Team Championship (1 time) and NWA Canadian Heavyweight Championship (1 time)
5	2013	Short Sleeve Sampson (Daniel DiLucchio)	Crazy Horse	Midget Wrestling	
6	2014	Bob Leonard	Ross Hart	Announcing	Longtime ring announcer and photographer for Stampede Wrestling
7	2015	Plum Loco (Chad Straza)	Thryllin' Dylan	Wrestling	Won the Canadian Unified Junior Heavyweight Championship (1 time), HIW Great Plains Provincial Championship (1 time) and HIW Canadian Tag Team Championship (1 time)
8	2016	"Principal" Richard Pound (John Cozman)	Bob Leonard	Wrestling	Won the HIW Central Canadian Heavyweight Championship (4 times), HIW Great Plains Provincial Championship (1 time), HIW Tag Team Championship (2 times), Stampede North American Heavyweight Championship (1 time) and Stampede British Commonwealth Mid-Heavyweight Championship (1 time)
9	2016	Phil Alderson		Wrestling Fan	
10	2019	Rex Roberts (Troy Hazen)		Wrestling	Won the HIW Central Canadian Heavyweight Championship (4 times), HIW Wildside Provincial Championship (1 time) and HIW Canadian Tag Team Championship (1 time)

- ^{a} – Entries without a birth name indicates that the inductee did not perform under a ring name.
- ^{b} – This section mainly lists the major accomplishments of each inductee in the promotion.
