= List of independent wrestling promotions in Canada =

This is a list of independent wrestling promotions in Canada, sorted by regional area, and lists both active and defunct "indy promotions."

== West Coast ==
=== British Columbia ===
| Name | Location | Owner(s) | Years active | Website | Notes |
|---|---|---|---|---|---|
Active
| All-Star Wrestling | Vancouver | Parm Singh Athwal | 2007– | Yes | Continuation of NWA: All-Star Wrestling. |
| Big West Wrestling | Kelowna | Chris Olson | 2011– | Yes | |
| BOOM! Pro Wrestling | Vancouver | Max Mitchell | 2022– | Yes | |
| Nation Extreme Wrestling | Vancouver | Chris Parry | 2021– | Yes | |
| Thrash Wrestling | Okanagan | Nick Szalanski | 2004– | Yes | |
| Vancouver Island Pro Wrestling | Nanaimo | Brent LaPlante, Cody Washington | 2013– | Yes | |
Defunct
| All-Star Wrestling | Vancouver | Cliff Parker (1949–1968); Rod Fenton (1950–1968); Sandor Kovac (1968–1977); Gene Kiniski (1968–1983); Al Tomko (1977–1989) | 1962–1989 | No | |
| Canadian Wrestling Alliance | Chilliwack | Dave Bruce; Judy Bruce; Dillon Powers | 1993–1994 | No | |
| Elite Canadian Championship Wrestling | Vancouver | Dave Republic (1996–2010); Michael Sweetser (2010–2012); ECCW Entertainment, LTD (2010–) | 1996–2020 | Yes | Formerly Extreme Canadian Championship Wrestling. |
| International Championship Wrestling | Vancouver | Tim Flowers | 1996–2010 | No | |
| Pacific Coast Championship Wrestling | Vancouver | Rocky Dellaserra; Fred Roselli | 1989–1994 | No | |
| Pro Wrestling Canada | Vancouver | Cobra; Moondog Manson | 2004–2005 | Yes | |
| Pure Wrestling Association | Campbell River | Mike Becherer | 2013– | No | |
| Top Ranked Wrestling | Abbotsford | Grunt; Layne Fontaine | 2004–2005 | No | |
| Universal Wrestling Alliance | Vancouver | Al Tomko | 1985–1989 | No | |
| Victoria City Wrestling | Victoria | Vid Vain | 2005 | No | |
| West Coast Championship Wrestling | Vancouver | Mark Vellios | 1991–1996 | No | |
| BCW Pro Wrestling / Power Pro Wrestling | British Columbia | Shaun Myall (Dirty Money) | 1997–2003 (BCW) 2005–2009 (PPW) | No | |

== Canadian Prairies ==
=== Alberta ===
| Name | Location | Owner(s) | Years active | Website | Notes |
|---|---|---|---|---|---|
Active
| Can-Am Wrestling | Calgary | Otto Gentile | 1997–2002; 2021– | Yes | |
| Monster Pro Wrestling | Edmonton | Sean Dunster | 2002– | Yes | |
| Love Pro Wrestling | Edmonton | Spencer Love | 2021– | Yes | |
| Pure Power Wrestling | Lethbridge | Kevin Farrell; Kyle Kristiansen; Jim Kristensen; Richard Rainey Curtis Jestin | 2010– | Yes | |
| Real Canadian Wrestling | Edmonton | Steven Ewaschuk | 2003– | Yes | |
| Wild Rose Sports Association | Calgary | Jay Sullivan | 2022– | Yes | |
Defunct
| Can-Am Wrestling | Grand Prairie | Martin Boroditsky | 1989 | No | |
| Canadian All-Pro Wrestling | Calgary | Tim Stein | 2011–2012 | No | |
| Canadian Championship Wrestling | Edmonton | | | | |
| Canadian Rocky Mountain Wrestling | Calgary | Darryl Harty; Ed Langley | 1992–1995 | No | |
| Canadian Wrestling Coalition | Red Deer | Dylon Featherstone | 2015-2019 | No | The promotion was sold to Real Canadian Wrestling in early 2019 and they did a few co-hosted shows under "RCW/CWC" through that year but after their August 2019 show they announced their official closure and dropped the "CWC" from their initials, thereby marking the end of the Canadian Wrestling Coalition. |
| Canadian Wrestling Connection | Calgary | Bob Pupetz | 1989–1992 | No | |
| Hart Legacy Wrestling | Calgary | John Oniston (2013); Smith Hart (2015–2017); Stacey Angel | 2013–2017 | No | |
| Power Zone Wrestling | Lethbridge | Tim Strom | 2005–2009 | No | |
| Revolution Pro | Edmonton | Justin Sczembora | 2013–2014 | | |
| Stampede Wrestling | Calgary | Stu Hart (1948–1984); Vince McMahon (1984–1985); Bruce Hart (1985–1989, 1999–2005); Ross Hart (1999–2005); Bill Bell (2005–2008) | 1948–1989; 1999–2008 | No | |

=== Saskatchewan ===
| Name | Location | Owner(s) | Years active | Website | Notes |
|---|---|---|---|---|---|
Active
| Best Entertainment Wrestling | Saskatoon | | 2020– | Yes | |
| Prairie Pro Wrestling | Saskatoon | Roberto Ureta | 2019– | Facebook | |
| Reaper Wrestling | Moose Jaw | | 2025- | Yes | |
| Ringside Wrestling | Moose Jaw | Joe Neustaeter | 2014– | Yes | |
Defunct
| Gold Dragon Wrestling | Moose Jaw | Jan and Michelle Armstrong | 2008–2014 | Yes | |
| Hardcore Wrestling/Wild West Wrestling | Regina | Scott Wheatley | 1996–1998 | Yes | |
| High Impact Wrestling Canada | Regina | Charles Pichette (1996–2012); Mike Roberts (2012–2019) | 1998–2019 | Yes | Split Brand: HIW Wildside |
| High Impact Wrestling Wildside | Regina/Saskatoon | Mike Roberts | 2014–2015 2017–2019 | Yes | Split Brand: HIW Canada |
| Professional Outlaw Wrestling | Saskatoon | Crash Crimson | 2001–2005 | Yes | |

=== Manitoba ===
| Name | Location | Owner(s) | Years active | Website | Notes |
|---|---|---|---|---|---|
Active
| Canadian Wrestling's Elite | Winnipeg | Danny Warren | 2009– | Yes | |
| Primos Wrestling Canada | Winnipeg | Graeme Keam | 2010– | No | |
| Union of Wrestling | Winnipeg | | 2016– | No | |
| Winnipeg Pro Wrestling | Winnipeg | | 2018– | Yes | |
Defunct
| Action Wrestling Entertainment | Winnipeg | Jeff Dyck | 2005–2006 | No | |
| Canadian Wrestling Federation | Winnipeg | Ernie Todd | 1979–1984 | No | |
| International Wrestling Alliance | Winnipeg | Joan McGuire; Tony Condello | 1974–2000 | No | Originally known as the West Four Wrestling Alliance from 1974 to 1994. |
| New Wrestling Nation | Île-des-Chênes | Dan King | 2006–2011 | | |
| Premier Championship Wrestling | Winnipeg | Andrew Shallcross | 2002–2022 | | |
| Steeltown Pro Wrestling | Selkirk | Rob Stardom; TJ Bratt | 2007–2013 | Yes | |
| Supercard Wrestling | Winnipeg | Walter Shechyk | 1979–1984 | No | Formerly known as New Brand Wrestling. |
| WFX Wrestling | Winnipeg | Jeff Dyck | 2007–2010 | No | |

== Central Canada ==
=== Ontario ===
| Name | Location | Owner(s) | Years active | Website | Notes |
|---|---|---|---|---|---|
Active
| Acclaim Pro Wrestling | Ottawa | Chaz Lovely (2010–); Brent Doherty (2010–) | 2010– | Yes | |
| Alpha-1 Wrestling | Hamilton | Julian Micevski (2010–) | 2010– | Yes | This company was on an indefinite hiatus as of their show on October 21, 2012, due to financial issues that are related to thefts totaling at least $1,350. It resumed in 2013 with REHAB. |
| Barrie Wrestling | Barrie | Shawn Gibson | 2015– | Yes | |
| Big Time Pro Wrestling | Ottawa | Joe Dunlap; Pat Paquette | 2004– | Yes | Associated with Bodyslammers Gym. Head trainer Claude Prest and trainers Crimson X and Hangman. |
| Border City Wrestling | Windsor | Scott D'Amore | 1993– | Yes | |
| Border Town Pro Wrestling | Fort Erie | Chris Snieg | 2018– | Yes | |
| Capital City Championship Wrestling (C*4) | Ottawa | Mark P. | 2007– | Yes | |
| Canadian Pro Wrestling | Woodstock | Robbie McAllister | 2011– | Yes | |
| Canadian Wrestling Federation | St. Catharines | Frank Ryckman | 2014– | Yes | |
| Chem Valley Wrestling | Sarnia | Brian White and Kyle Bruner | 2019 | | |
| Chinlock Wrestling | Kingston | Jan Murphy | | Yes | |
| Classic Championship Wrestling | Southern Ontario | Jay McDonald | 2009– | Yes | |
| CrossBody Pro Wrestling | Kitchener | Ben Ortmanns; Chris Tidwell | 2016– | | |
| Crossfire Wrestling | St. Catharines | Chris LaPlante | 2012– | Yes | |
| Deathproof Fight Club | South-Western Ontario | Chad Gowing | 2009– | Yes | |
| Demand Lucha | Toronto | Jordan Matthew Marques | 2015– | Yes | |
| Destiny Wrestling | Mississauga | Emilio Albi | 2014– | Yes | |
| Great Canadian Wrestling | Oshawa | David Lorne | 2005– | Yes | |
| Greektown Wrestling | Toronto | Channing Decker | 2015– | Yes | |
| Independent Pro Wrestling | Brantford | Mike Shea | 2002– | Yes | |
| Magnificent Championship Wrestling | Brantford | Nick Mercante | 2010– | Yes | |
| Maple Leaf Pro Wrestling | Windsor | Scott D'Amore | 2024– | Yes | |
| Noble Champions Group Pro Wrestling | Windsor | Michael Joseph | 2024– | Yes | |
| Northland Wrestling | North Bay | Dann Pigozzo | 2016– | Yes | |
| Northumberland Pro Wrestling | Northumberland County | Derek Sharp, Lionel Poizner, Rob MacArthur | 2019– | Yes | |
| Ontario Elite Wrestling (OEW) | North Bay | Steve Lavictoire, Rhyan Tourout | 2022– | | |
| Pro Wrestling Eclipse | Oshawa | Sean Murley | 2010– | Yes | |
| Pure Wrestling Association | Kitchener; Guelph | Mike Becherer | 2005– | Yes | |
| PWA Niagara | Niagara Region | Pete Stalmach | 2006– | Yes | |
| Smash Wrestling | Toronto | | 2011– | Yes | |
| Superkick'D Live | Toronto | Ashley Sixx, Kris Chambers | 2015– | Yes | |
| Union of Independent Professional Wrestlers | Toronto | Anthony Kingdom James | 2007- 2012 2014-2019 | Yes | |
Defunct
| Apocalypse Wrestling Federation | Toronto | Ron Hutchison | 1998–2004; 2008 | Yes | |
| BSE Pro | Toronto | Dave Blezzard | 2005–2010 | No | Merged with Border City Wrestling to form Maximum Pro Wrestling in 2010. |
| Canadian Grand Prix Wrestling | | Joe Dunlap | 2003–2007 | Yes | |
| Canadian Wrestling Action | Cornwall | Greg Ezard | 2007–2015 | Yes | |
| Canadian Wrestling Revolution | Toronto | Frank Greco | 2007–2010 | Yes | |
| Championship Wrestling International | Brantford | Nick "Nitro" Wyman | 1998– | Yes | |
| Conflict Wrestling | Kitchener | Jeffery Marsh | 2011–2014, 2016 | Yes | Formerly known as Tri-City Wrestling |
| Extreme Wrestling League Show | Brooklin | Darryl Swoffer | 2007–2014 | Yes | |
| Fight! Brand | Toronto | Ashley Sixx | 2011–2014 | Yes | |
| Fringe Pro Wrestling | Hamilton | Cameron Banks | 2013–2016 | No | |
| Great White North Wrestling | Hamilton | Jack Kinsella | 2007–2013 | Yes | |
| Hogtown Wrestling | Toronto | Jay Nadler | 2012–2017 | Yes | Formerly known as Victory Commonwealth Wrestling. |
| Maple Leaf Wrestling | Toronto | Jack Corcoran (1930–1939); John Tunney (1939); Frank Tunney (1939–1983); Jack Tunney (1983–1986); Eddie Tunney (1983–1986) | 1930–1986 | No | |
| Maximum Pro Wrestling | Toronto; Windsor | Scott D'Amore; Arda Ocal; Jason Brown; Jeffrey Scott; James Trepanier; Dave Blezard | 2010– | Yes | |
| Neo Wrestling | Niagara Falls | Jesse Friskey (2002–2006) Jesse Scott (2002–2006, 2011–) | 2002–2006; 2011– | Yes | Formerly known as Neo Spirit Pro Wrestling |
| Niagara Pro Wrestling | Fort Erie | Aaron Thompson | 2010–2013 | Yes | |
| Mecca Pro Wrestling | Cornwall | | 2010–2016 | Yes | |
| Moonshine Branded Wrestling | Welland | Matthew Terry | 2011–2014, 2016 | Yes | |
| Ontario Championship Wrestling | Kingston | Roy Demerchant | 2016–2019 | Yes | |
| Pro Wrestling Xtreme | Tillsonburg | Jay McDonald/Dan Vandekerckhove | 2004–2009 | Yes | |
| Rage Wrestling Entertainment | Ottawa | Damian Styles | 2005–2012 | Yes | Merged with Big Time Pro Wrestling in 2012. |
| Sault Area Wrestling | Sault Ste. Marie | Rob Zagorc | 2007–2014 | Yes | |
| Squared Circle Wrestling | Toronto | Rob Fuego | 2010– | Yes | |
| Steel City Pro Wrestling | Hamilton | | 2014–2017 | Yes | |
| TWA Powerhouse | St. Catharines | Frank Ryckman | 2008–2013 | Yes | |
| Twin Wrestling Entertainment | Toronto | Jian Magen; Page Magen | 1999–2011 | Yes | |
| WrestleCrisis | Toronto | Ross Aitken | 2011–2014 | Yes | |
| Wrestling Abaddon | Toronto | Osiris | 2015–2016 | Yes | |

=== Quebec ===
| Name | Location | Owner(s) | Years active | Website | Notes |
|---|---|---|---|---|---|
Active
| BATTLEWAR | Montreal | James McGee; Mike Daponte | 2012– | No | |
| Federation de Lutte Québécoise / Théâtre Extrême | Montréal | Carl Leduc | 2001– | Yes | |
| Granby Entertainment Wrestling | Granby | Sébastien Maltais | 2002– | Yes | |
| Inter Species Wrestling | Montreal | Mike Rotch | 2005– | Yes | |
| International Wrestling Syndicate | Montreal | Manny Eleftheriou | 1998–2010; 2014– | Yes | |
| La Descente du Coude | Montreal | Maxime Thifault; Julien Ethier; Guillaume Maltais | 2017– | Yes | |
| Mystery Wrestling | Gatineau | Evil Uno | 2019- | | |
| nCw Femmes Fatales | Montreal | François Poirier; Phil Bélanger | 2009– | Yes | |
| Northern Championship Wrestling | Montreal | François Poirier; Phil Bélanger | 1986– | Yes | |
| North Shore Pro Wrestling | Quebec | Steve Boutet | 2011– | Yes | |
| Gatineau Pro wrestling (GPW) | Gatineau | Dereick Clement; Martin villeneuve Stephane Gauthier; Denis Gauthier | 2019– | No | |
Defunct
| Canadian International Wrestling | | Mike Vachon; Paul Vachon | 1994 | No | |
| Elite Wrestling Revolution | Quebec City | Eric Picard; Patrick La Rue; Claude Provost | 2004–2005 | No | |
| Grand Prix Wrestling | Montreal | Lucien Gregoire; Gary Legault; Paul Vachon | 1971–1974 | No | |
| International Wrestling Association | Montreal | Eddie Quinn (1935–1964); Bob Langevin (1965–1975); Johnny Rougeau (1965–1975) | 1935–1975 | No | Originally known as the American Wrestling Association from 1935 to 1965. |
| Lutte Internationale | Montreal | Andre the Giant (1980–1984); Gino Brito (1980–1987); Frank Valois (1980–1987) | 1980–1987 | No | |
| Royal Wrestling Ring | Verdun | Alain Field | 1994–1997 | No | |
| World All-Star Wrestling | Montreal | | 1994–1995 | No | |

== Atlantic ==
=== New Brunswick ===
| Name | Location | Owner(s) | Years active | Website | Notes |
|---|---|---|---|---|---|
Active
| Atlantic Grand Prix Wrestling | Shediac | Emile Duprée (1977–1986, 2001– Present); Paul Peller (1986–1992); Mike Zinck (2001) | 1977–1992; 2001–Present | No | Also referred to as "Grand Prix." Runs intermittently. |
| Innovative Hybrid Wrestling | Greater Moncton | Julien Young (2005–); Mathieu Titus (2005–); Serge Doucet (2005–2013); Dave Cawley (2005–2015); Kevin Tyler (2013–2018); Peter Smith (2018–); Sandra Taylor (2018–); Chris Glidden (2018–) | 2005– | Yes | |
| North Pro Canadian Wrestling | Greater Moncton, New Brunswick | Eric Doucet | 2015– | No | Also Referred to as "North Pro Wrestling or North Pro" |
Defunct
| NWE Pro Wrestling | Miramichi, Sussex, St.John | Sean Nelson, Isaac Malley (2013-2021) Dana Christie (2021–Present) | 2013–2021 | Yes | Also Referred to as "Next Wrestling Entertainment" |

=== Nova Scotia ===
| Name | Location | Owner(s) | Years active | Website | Notes |
|---|---|---|---|---|---|
Active
| Downtown Wrestling | Halifax | | 2022– | Yes | |
| Dave Boyce Championship Wrestling | Springhill / Dartmouth | David Boyce | 2022– | Yes | |
| Kaizen Pro Wrestling | Halifax / Dartmouth | Covey Christ | 2019– | Yes | |
| Ultimate Championship Wrestling | Spryfield | Chuck Martin | 2007– | Yes | |
| Pro Wrestling Unleashed | Halifax | Harold Kennedy | 2020- | No | |
| United Wrestling | Annapolis Valley | Dana Christie | 2005- | | |
Defunct
| Canadian Championship Wrestling | Berwick | Paul Peller; Stephen Petitpas | 1990-1992 | No | |
| East Coast Pro Wrestling | Kingston | Sheldon MacLean | 2005-2010 | No | |
| Eastern Sports Association | Halifax | Al Zink (1969–1975); Rudy Kay (1969–1975); Bobby Kay (1975–1976) | 1969-1976 | No | |
| New Breed Wrestling | Truro | Chris Cooke & Tyson Hamilton | 2008-2012 | Yes | No |
| WrestleCentre | Halifax | Jason Mosher | 2014-2016 | Yes | |
| Relentless Wrestling | | Dana Christie | 2022-2023 | | |
| EPIC Pro Wrestling | South Shore | Doug Robar | 2022-2024 | no | |

=== Newfoundland and Labrador ===
| Name | Location | Owner(s) | Years active | Website | Notes |
|---|---|---|---|---|---|
Active
| Inner City Wrestling | Bonavista | Brady Hobbs | 2023– | Yes | |
| New Evolution Wrestling | St. John's | Bill Hart( 2023–2026 ) [formerly: Travis Canning 2016-2023) | 2016- | Yes | |
Defunct
| Newfoundland Championship Wrestling | St. John's | Bennett Brothers | 1998–2005 , 2017-2023 | No | |
| Cutting Edge Wrestling | St. John's | Sailor White; Gord Glynn | 1998–2007 2011–2019 | No | |
| Newfoundland Pro Wrestling | St. John's | Steve Clarke | 2013–2015 | No | |

=== Prince Edward Island ===
| Name | Location | Owner(s) | Years active | Website | Notes |
|---|---|---|---|---|---|
Active
| Island Pro Wrestling | Cornwall | Doug Parker (2021 - 2024) Adam Doucette Chris Frizzell Cody Conway Dwyane Broderick Justin Somers Steve Frizzell (2025 -) | Classic Era 2021–2024 New Era 2025– | Yes | |
| Red Rock Wrestling | Stratford | Mike Hughes | 2009– | Yes | |

== See also ==
- Professional wrestling in Canada
