= Gary Williams (wrestler) =

Canadian professional wrestler, actor, and musician (born 1972)

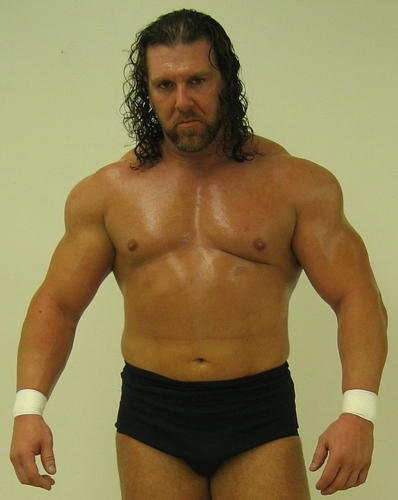
- Wildman Gary Williams

Personal information
- Born: Gary William Gallant; June 2, 1972 (age 54) Moncton, New Brunswick, Canada

Professional wrestling career
- Ring name(s): Wildman Williams; Wildman Austin; Bad Boy Gary Williams
- Billed height: 6 ft 0 in (1.83 m)
- Billed weight: 232 lb (105 kg)
- Billed from: Moncton, New Brunswick, Canada
- Trained by: Todd McPhee; Hubert Gallant; Leo Burke; Bret Hart
- Debut: May 24, 1997

Gary William Gallant (born June 2, 1972) better known by his ring name "Wildman" Gary Williams is a professional wrestler, trainer, actor, musician, and security specialist. He has been competing in Canadian independent wrestling circuits since the 1990s; and is best known for brief stints in World Championship Wrestling and the World Wrestling Federation. He starred as one of the leading characters in the docu-drama series Wrestling With Reality.

== Professional wrestling career ==
=== Early career ===
Born in Moncton, New Brunswick, Williams was a wrestling fan growing up and eventually contacted local referee Frank Parker and wrestler Todd "The Bodd" Douglas in 1996 to begin training for a career in professional wrestling.

Training with Douglas for a short time, Williams later trained with Atlantic Grand Prix and Stampede Wrestling veteran Hubert Gallant in March 1997 before making his professional debut three months later on May 24 in Truro, Nova Scotia for Emile Dupre's Grand Prix Wrestling. Remaining with the promotion throughout the summer, he was eventually noticed at an event in Cocagne, New Brunswick by Leo Burke who was scouting talent in the Maritimes and invited Williams to train with Bret Hart in his personal home in Calgary, Alberta where he had a WWE ring set up. Hart and Burke trained potential WWE Talent such as: Andrew Martin (Test), Adam Copeland (Edge), Jason Reso (Christian), Mark Henry, Ken Shamrock, among others. Williams also spent a bit of time at the Hart Dungeon in Calgary, Alberta.

Arriving in Calgary in January 1998, Williams would spend much of the year training with Bret Hart, Leo Burke and Bad News Allen before returning to the Maritimes.

=== World Championship Wrestling and the World Wrestling Federation ===
During the next few years, Williams would compete for numerous independent promotions including Stampede Wrestling, the Can-Am Wrestling Federation and promoter Tony Condello's IWA promotion feuding with Steve Rivers and Sean Dunster (Massive Damage) while continuing to compete for Grand Prix Wrestling during the summer months and eventually becoming one of the leading wrestlers on the Canadian independent circuit.

In March 1999, Burke negotiated with World Championship Wrestling for Williams to appear in several tryout matches which wrestling his former trainer Todd Douglas on Monday Night Nitro in Toronto and on WCW Saturday Night in Kitchener. After another tryout match in Winnipeg a year later, he contacted Kevin Kelly and received a tryout match on WWF Jakked as Wildman Austin against Billy Gunn at the Calgary Saddledome on May 28, 2001.

=== Return to the Maritimes ===
Continuing to compete in Canada, spending his winters in Calgary and his summers in the Maritimes, Williams worked with several younger wrestlers in Grand Prix Wrestling including "Kowboy" Mike Hughes and Peter Smith (Brody Steele aka Kingman) during the late 1990s. One of several wrestlers who joined Hughes in Real Action Wrestling, a rival promotion of Grand Prix Wrestling, he would feud with Hughes and Robert Roode defeating them in several singles and tag team matches with Chi Chi Cruz before losing to Hughes on July 22, 2001.

While in the promotion, he would also feud with rival Massive Damage, Hughes and members of his stable The Kardinal Sinners as well as wrestling against Barry Horowitz, Eddie Watts and Duke McIsaac during the summer.

Feuding with Chi Chi Cruz over the RAW Heavyweight title during 2002, Williams eventually lost to Cruz in a ladder cage match on July 29, 2002. During the next two years, he would tour Canada defeating Steve Wilde to win the Can-Am Heavyweight title on February 3, 2003 and won a three-way match over Aiden Pringle (Synn) and King Lau at an event for Monster Pro Wrestling in Edmonton, Alberta on February 4, 2004.

=== 2004–2009 ===
In September 2004, Williams permanently relocated to Halifax, Nova Scotia after the decline of wrestling events in the Calgary area and eventually opened his own wrestling school Wildman Academy on February 1, 2005. With his previous experience running many seminars and helping run training camps at Massive Damage's wrestling school in Edmonton, Alberta Wildman Academy soon became one of the leading wrestling schools in the Maritime Provinces. Williams shut down his training school in September 2009.

Williams also competed in the first and second annual Maritime Cup tournament held by Harold Kennedy (New Scott) which featured many of the top independent wrestlers in Canada including Brody Steele (Kingman), Duke MacIsaac, Trash Canyon, Scott Savage, Tony Armstrong, Cinder, Lincoln Steen, Marko Estrada and Vinny Glyde. Williams would defeat Paco Loco in the opening rounds and Scott Savage in the semifinals before losing to Duke McIsaac in the finals. He would also defeat Tony Armstrong and Scott Savage while in ECPW during early May.

Starting in September 2007, Williams was 1 of 4 main characters in the documentary-drama television series "Wrestling With Reality" which features many Canadian independent wrestlers including "Kowboy" Mike Hughes, Sidewinder, Marisa, Titus, and Krysta Lynn Scott.

He would go on to win the first match on Wrestling Reality teaming with Robert Roode to defeat Rick Doyle (Trash Canyon) & Gary Jessom (Duke MacIsaac) on June 2, 2006; he would later defeat Roode in a singles match to become the first Wrestling Reality Heavyweight Champion. He would later face Titus, who recently won the third Maritime Cup Tournament, defeating him at the Halifax Forum on August 18, 2006.

Defeating Titus and "Kowboy" Mike Hughes during early 2007, Williams and Trash Canyon lost a tag team match to "Kowboy" Mike Hughes and Ryan Mader (Lincoln Steen) on May 2. Williams then teamed with James Mason, and they defeated Jeff Young (Tommy Osbourne) & Scott Savage in Sussex, New Brunswick on May 4. Williams lost his title to Peter Smith (Brody Steele) in Bathurst, New Brunswick on May 5 due to outside interference by "Kowboy" Mike Hughes and Lincoln Steen. Trash Canyon and James Mason quickly came to Williams rescue and taunted Steele, Hughes and Steen to come back in the ring and have a 6 man tag team match but as the crowd cheered for the match, Steele, Hughes and Steen walked away and denied the challenge.

=== 2009–2014 ===
On October 22, 2009 Williams won the UCW Heavyweight Championship for the first time; defeating Kardinal Sinners partner Trash Canyon at the Halifax Forum. Williams lost the belt to Lumberjack Jackson on April 3, 2010. Through 2010, Williams competed with many former WWE talents; gaining wins against Marty Jennetty, "Bushwacker" Luke Williams, and Charlie Haas.

In September, 2010 Williams signed with the upstart Legend City Wrestling based in Newfoundland, Canada; and was reunited with his former longtime wrestling mates. Including Mike Hughes, Kurrgan, and Brody Steele.

On April 28, 2011 Williams would win the UCW Heavyweight Championship a second time; defeating J.P. Simms. He would drop the belt back to Simms on August 26, 2011. In 2011, Williams signed with Championship Wrestling International (CWI) of Ontario, Canada; touring with them August 18 through August 28, 2011 for the Maritime Invasion tour. Along with CWI Champion Scott Steiner the CWI roster for this tour featured Hulk Hogan, Sean Waltman (X-Pac), Monty Sopp (Billy Gunn), Road Dog, Mick Foley, "The Highlander" Robbie McAllister and Kevin Nash. In Corner Brook, Newfoundland, Williams joined a group named "Mutiny" consisting of "Highlander" Robbie McAllister, Jon Bolen and The Flatliners.

Williams made his New Breed Wrestling debut on May 19, 2012. In the final match of the promotions last event, Williams defeated Chris Cooke to win the NBW Heavyweight Championship. The belt was immediately retired.

On April 20, 2014; Williams announced his retirement from professional wrestling on a full-time basis. He continued running his training school, Wildman Academy, training several notable Atlantic Canadian wrestlers, including Maddison Miles, Justin Newhook, and Thad Howett.

=== 2014–2017 ===
In 2016 Williams began wrestling again and admitted that his 2014 retirement was "partially" a story line for a WrestleCentre angle. Williams also stated that he was not sure at the time if he would be able to continue wrestling due to his injuries but after some time off Williams stepped back into the ring in 2016.

=== 2017–2025 ===
Williams is still involved in pro wrestling by making appearances and wrestling the occasional matches. In 2025 Williams was involved in 3 matches across the province of Nova Scotia, Canada. Williams shows no signs of sitting on the side lines in 2026 as he is already taking some bookings.

== Personal life ==
Prior to becoming a wrestler, Williams was the lead vocalist for heavy metal band 'Tormented'; which later became known as Dead Reach. The Wrestling Reality intro music and some of the background music was performed by Dead Reach.

Williams is an experienced private bodyguard specializing in close protection of VIP's visiting Atlantic Canada.

== Championships and accomplishments ==
- Atlantic Grand Prix Wrestling
  - AGPW Continental Championship (1 time)
- Can-Am Wrestling Federation
  - Can-Am Heavyweight Championship (2 times)
  - Can-Am Trans American Heavyweight Championship (1 time)
  - Can-Am Tag Team Championship (with Steve Wilde) (1 time)
- Grand Prix Wrestling
  - GPW International Heavyweight Championship (2 time)
- Hardcore Wrestling/Outlaw Pro Wrestling
  - Hardcore Tag Team Championship (1 time) - with Massive Damage
- International Wrestling Alliance
  - IWA North American Heavyweight Championship (1 time)
- Monster Pro Wrestling
  - MPW Heavyweight Championship (1 time)
- New Breed Wrestling
  - NBW Heavyweight Championship (1 time, final)
- Real Action Wrestling
  - RAW Heavyweight Championship (2 times)
- Ultimate Championship Wrestling
  - UCW Heavyweight Championship (2 times)
  - UCW Tag Team Championship (1 time) - with Mike Hughes
  - UCW 2010 Slammy Award - Best Feud (with Lumber Jack Johnson)
  - UCW 2010 Slammy Award - Best Overall Wrestler
- Western Canadian Extreme Wrestling
  - WCEW Heavyweight Championship (1 time)
- Wrestling Reality
  - Wrestling Reality Heavyweight Championship (1 time)
