= Duke MacIsaac =

Canadian professional wrestler

Personal information
- Born: Gary Jessome; November 7, 1978 (age 47) North Sydney, Nova Scotia, Canada
- Website: TheDuke.com; Duke.MaritimeWrestling.com

Professional wrestling career
- Ring name(s): Duke MacIsaac; The Widow Maker
- Billed height: 6 ft 3 in (1.91 m)
- Billed weight: 245 lb (111 kg)
- Billed from: Glasgow, Scotland
- Trained by: Mike Hughes; Kingman
- Debut: February 27, 2001

Gary Jessome (born November 7, 1978) is a Canadian professional wrestler and trainer, best known by his ringname "The Canadian Widowmaker" Duke MacIsaac, who has competed primarily in the Maritimes-based All Canadian Wrestling, East Coast Pro Wrestling, Grand Prix Wrestling and Real Action Wrestling, but has also toured Great Britain and the United States.

A former student of "Kowboy" Mike Hughes, he was one of several Kardinal Sinner Wrestling School graduates to be featured in the Canadian television documentary series Wrestling Reality. The series not only covered his time on the road but also his performance as the 3rd annual Maritime Cup tournament where he wrestled in the main event to crown the first Wrestling Reality heavyweight champion. Jessome has also been an instructor in "boot camps" for the Kardinal Sinner wrestling school.

== Biography ==
=== Real Action Wrestling (2001-2002) ===
Gary Jessome was born in North Sydney, Nova Scotia on November 7, 1978. He was working in Moncton, New Brunswick when he met Kingman and was invited to train at his Kardinal Sinners Wrestling School with himself and co-owner "Kowboy" Mike Hughes. Having a lifelong interest in weightlifting and bodybuilding, Jessome accepted and they soon began traveling to the Johnstons River area in Prince Edward Island where he and Kingman worked out in a barn while Mike Hughes taught him ring psychology and technical ability. He suffered numerous injuries during his time at the Kardinal Sinners "boot camp" including a concussion, whiplash, bruised kidneys, heels and tail bone. By the time of his graduation in 2001, Jessome was considered one of their top students and was later brought back to the school as a part-time trainer. Jessome has claimed that Kingman heavily influenced his career and wrestling style.

He made his debut match in Hughes' Real Action Wrestling against fellow student and training partner Downtown Ray Brown in Charlottetown, Prince Edward Island on February 27, 2001. In April, Jessome joined one of the promotion's earliest Maritime tours which included Kingman, Mike Hughes, Larry Destiny, Bill Skullion, Notorious T.I.D., Rogue, Buddy Lane, Bobby Rude and Kurrgan. Joe E. Legend, Chi Chi Cruz and Wildman Austin also joined later on. He would also have a series of matches against Buddy Lane in the next three months, most of which he lost, before scoring his first major victory against Corporal Chaos in Irishtown, New Brunswick on May 2. That same month, he faced Bill Skullion twice in two "hardcore matches" as well as losing another match to the Acadian Giant. He feuded with Massive Damage during the summer, also facing him in hardcore matches, as well as teaming with Eddie Watts to defeat Flesh Gordon & Custom Made Man in a tag team match in his hometown of North Sydney on August 12. Jessome would face both Custom Made Man and Watts in a singles matches during the next few weeks. On August 20 in Cocagne, New Brunswick, MacIsaac fought and lost two matches in one night losing to Custom Made Man and Massive Damage. He would also lose to Chi Chi Cruz and Custom Made Man in singles matches several times over the next few weeks.

Returning to Cocagne on September 3, Jessome again teamed with Eddie Watts but lost to Flesh Gordon & Massive Damage. Two weeks later, he joined his rival Custom Made Man in a tag team match to defeat his former trainers Mike Hughes & Kingman in Sydney, Nova Scotia on September 16. A month later, a match between him and Flesh Gordon turned into a tag team match between him and Otto Bahn against Gordon & Buddy Lane. On October 20, he faced Custom Made Man in a "Scottish Pub match" in Halifax. He also wrestled Stephen Pettipas in Halifax on November 24, 2001, losing to him via disqualification.

Jessome became close friends with several wrestlers while touring with RAW among these being Lincoln Steen who claimed he was a practical joker. He once joked during an interview about learning "a great deal of invaluable lessons while on the road with them, things like don't trust Duke MacIsaac with a sharpie if you pass out in Mike Hughes’ van." In late-2001, Jessome injured his knee and remained out of action for several months. When RAW resumed operations early the following year, Jessome was one of the main stars to rejoin the promotion.

=== Real Action Wrestling and the independents (2002-2003) ===
He made his return match defeating Cinder in Halifax on May 4, 2002. A week later in North Sydney, he and Chi Chi Cruz lost to Gary Williams & Eddie Watts. Jessome won a number of single matches against Scott Savage, Aaron Idol and Johnny Wiseguy throughout the summer. One of these was a handicap match against Scott Savage & Trash Kanyon in Kentville, Nova Scotia held on June 5. He lost to Gary Williams in a "street fight" match in Louisdale three days later, and on several other occasions as well, but did score impressive victories over Mike Hughes; one of these occurred on the promotion's first television taping in Halifax on June 17. Later on, he rescued valet Rachel Bulman from the abusive Johnny Wise Guy. Although he lost to Hughes in a rematch the following night in O'Leary, Prince Edward Island, Jessome also won a battle royal at the same event. He would also defeat Hughes in subsequent rematches during the next two days as well as picking up wins against Remington Steen and Vance Nevada before losing to Bobby Rude in a table match in Charlottetown, Prince Edward Island on July 23.

He would also feud with Johnny Wise Guy over Rachel defeating him in both singles and mixed tag team matches against Johnny Wise Guy & "Sweet" Sarah Stock including one at a Halifax television taping on July 29. Shortly after this last appearance, the promotion closed down permanently. He made an appearance for Bobby Bass' All Canadian Wrestling defeating Flesh Gordon in Charlo, New Brunswick on August 23, 2002, and remained in the Maritimes finding work in Grand Prix Wrestling and later East Coast Pro Wrestling. A contender for the ECPW Heavyweight Championship in 2003, he failed to become its first champion, but eventually won the title from Kingman two years later.

=== The Maritime Cup and Wrestling With Reality (2003-2006) ===
On October 12, 2003, Jessome took part in the 1st annual Maritime Cup tournament at the Halifax Forum losing to Mike Hughes in the opening rounds. The event, which featured Bobby Roode, Lincoln Steen, Scott Savage, Gary Williams, Sonny Roselli and "The Future" Tony Armstrong, was a huge success and later released on VHS/DVD. In 2004, Jessome was one of the instructors at the Kardinal Sinners "boot camp". He was later critical of the typical wrestling student which he characterized "as a mix [of] "It's cool to act tough guys" to "I'm great because my Mom tells me so". He later helped promote Gary Williams' newly opened wrestling school in Halifax and said in one interview "If there is anything I could say about this school is that anyone who is seriously wanting to be trained should take action and reap the rewards of learning from a great Maritime legend".

By the time of the 2nd annual Maritime Cup in Kentville, Nova Scotia, Jessome was considered the tournament favorite. There was a slight alteration to this version as it would be closed to wrestlers outside the Maritime provinces so as to showcase top talent in the region. Although the tournament's concept was created by Kingman and Trash Canyon, but Jessome and Gary Williams were also credited for helping with its development. Earlier that year, they had met Sarah Dunsworth, star of the TV comedy Trailer Park Boys, at her Barrington Street store Junk and Foibles which was a popular spot for local wrestler to purchase costumes and similar items. They initially were interested in using Bubbles from Trailer Park Boys to make a guest appearance at their wrestling show in Moncton but eventually involved her as director in a new television documentary series entitled "Wrestling With Reality". The series would follow themselves around the Canadian independent circuit and the planned Maritime Cup. Dunsworth would also help finance and promote the show.

Jessome defeated Vinny Glyde, Trash Canyon and Gary Williams advancing to the finals where he lost to Kingman. Sarah Dunsworth appeared in the corner of Trash Canyon during the tournament, but after he lost to Jessome in the second round, Canyon shoved her to the ground blaming Dunsworth for the loss. She was rescued by Jessome, who attacked Canyon, and remained with him for the rest of the tournament. His final match against Kingman was marred by the "heel turn" of Bobby Roode, then acting special guest referee, who hit Jessome with a steel chair then allowed Kingman to score the pinfall. The Maritime Cup was awarded to winner, as was the ECPW Heavyweight title, but Kingman instead smashed the cup on the round and walked off with his Kardinal Sinners stablemates.

Jessome avenged his loss days later winning a battle royal to gain a match against Kingman and defeating him via disqualification. The next night in North Sydney, he defeated Kingman to win the ECPW Heavyweight Championship. He also took part in a three-day tour of Eastern Canada with Grand Prix Wrestling visiting Petit Rocher, New Brunswick, New Carlisle, Quebec and Borden, Prince Edward Island. Also featured were The Cuban Assassin, Gary Williams, Spiderman, Ryan Storm and Jeff Dupre. On November 26, 2005 in Canning, Nova Scotia, Jessome appeared in the main event in a best 2 out of 3 falls match with Lincoln Steen against Brody Steele and Gary Williams. Buddy Lane was the special guest referee.

The series finale took place at the 3rd annual Maritime Cup tournament at the Halifax Forum on June 2, 2006. Although not featured in the tournament itself, Jessome took part in the semi-main event pitting he and Trash Canyon in a tag team elimination match against Gary Williams & Bobby Roode. Williams would go on to beat Roode to become the first "Wrestling With Reality" Heavyweight Champion. The special referee was Buddy Lane.

On August 18, 2006, the "Wrestling With Reality" tour returned to the Halifax Forum where Jessome wrestled Tony Armstrong to determine the number one contender to the heavyweight title. Following a television taping during the tour, Jessome appeared with Kingman, Trash Canyon and others at an afterparty celebration at the Dresden Row nightclub, The Speakeasy, which also featured rock band Dogbite and performances by Pink Velvet Burlesque.

=== Recent years (2006-2007) ===
In late 2006, Jessome joined Brody Steele, Chad Collyer and Gangrel and other Canadian wrestlers for a three-month tour of the United Kingdom with All Star Wrestling. He was unable to rejoin the "Wrestling with Reality" tour when it resumed early the next year and, shortly after returning to Canada, relocated to Vancouver, British Columbia.

On May 26, 2007, he and Johnny Obsession lost to Mauler and Barry Goode at the Wrestling’s Hero’s and Villains supercard in Cloverdale, British Columbia. Afterwards, he and several other wrestlers, including Monster Pro Wrestling's Heavy Metal, spent several hours at the Citrus bar. On September 15, 2007, Jessome participated in a special fundraiser for the Special Olympics in Comox, British Columbia. At the event, he lost to Disco Fury but later went on to win the main event, a 15-man battle royal, to be awarded the Taco Del Mar-sponsored "Carlos Cup". On September 25, he defended the ECPW Heavyweight Championship in a triple threat match against Bobby Roode and "Kowboy" Mike Hughes. Former World Wrestling Federation veteran Tito Santana also made an appearance at the event. Both Santana and himself were quoted by the Cape Breton Post voicing their criticism towards steroid abuse in professional wrestling. Jessome said "I've got size and technical abilities, plus I love to entertain a crowd, so I think that's enough for me. To put your health at risk just to do something like that, that's not acceptable." After a two-year reign, he finally lost the ECPW Heavyweight Championship to Mike Hughes in North Sydney on September 30, 2007.

== Championships and accomplishments ==
- East Coast Pro Wrestling
  - ECPW Heavyweight Championship (1 time)
- Pro Wrestling United
  - PWU Heavyweight Championship (1 time)
