= Krysta Lynn Scott =

Canadian professional wrestler

Personal information
- Born: Krista Hanakowski; August 25, 1983 (age 42) Halifax, Nova Scotia, Canada
- Website: Krysta.com

Professional wrestling career
- Ring name(s): Krysta Lynn Scott; Krista Lynn Scott; Krysta Kinisky
- Billed height: 5 ft 6 in (1.68 m)
- Billed weight: 135 lb (61 kg)
- Trained by: Gary Williams; Tony Armstrong
- Debut: May 2006

Krista Hanakowski (born August 25, 1983) is a Canadian professional wrestler, known by her ring name Krysta Lynn Scott, who has competed both in Canada and the United States having worked for All-Star Wrestling, Grand Prix Wrestling, Extreme Canadian Championship Wrestling and Stampede Wrestling. Since her debut in 2006, Hanakowski is the first female wrestler since The Fabulous Moolah to regularly work for Grand Prix Wrestling in nearly 20 years.

A former student of "Wildman" Gary Williams, she appeared alongside her former teacher on the Canadian television documentary series Wrestling Reality. She was one of two female wrestlers, along with rival Purity Saint, featured on the series. Her relationship with then ex-boyfriend Tommy Ozbourne, another Wildman Academy graduate, was partly focused on in the series as well as her experiences as a female wrestler on the Canadian independent circuit.

Hanakowski has long been active in promoting women's wrestling in Canada, especially in the Maritimes, and has encouraged young women to enter professional wrestling both in interviews and her website. She has also been a strong advocate of responsible training in wrestling schools, having criticized other facilities she has visited, and has stressed proper training and physical fitness for prospective students.

== Biography ==
=== Early life and career ===
Krista Hanakowski was born in Halifax, Nova Scotia on August 25, 1983. Growing up in the nearby suburb of Hubley, she graduated from Sir John A. Macdonald High School in 2001 and later graduated with a degree in science from Dalhousie University in 2005. She had been a fan of wrestling during the Rock 'n' Wrestling era, her father having taken Hanakowski and her brother to WWF events as a child, and after graduation became interested in pursuing it as a career.

She began working out at a local gym and was eventually put in contact with "Wildman" Gary Williams. She started her training under Williams and Tony Armstrong at the Wildman Academy in Halifax starting in January 2006. Accompanied by promoter Harold Kennedy, Tony Armstrong and Tommy Ozbourne, Hanakowski made her debut five months later at an event for Sonny Roselli's New Wrestling Horizons in Maine. Both her matches in NWH were against male wrestlers in intergender matches. While training at the Wildman Academy, she was profiled in a cover story for the Halifax Daily News.

That summer, she joined Emile Dupree's 50th Anniversary Atlantic Grand Prix Wrestling tour spending 5 weeks in the Maritimes under the name Krysta Kinisky. During the tour, she faced her first female opponent, Ontario-born wrestler She Nay Nay, in a series of "Ladies matches" as well as mixed tag team matches with midget wrestlers Farmer Pete and Frenchie Lamont. On the last day of the tour, she and Spider-Man beat Tommy Osbourne & She-Nay-Nay on August 25, 2006. Both she and She Nay Nay were the first female wrestlers to have toured with the promotion since the 1980s.

A month later, she made an appearance for Innovative Hybrid Wrestling acting as valet for Chris Madison & Tommy Osbourne at the September to Surrender 2006 supercard. This was against The Party Boys, who had Heaven in their corner, and was to decide the #2 contenders for the IHW Tag Team Championship.

=== Wrestling Reality ===
In 2007, Hanakowski was one of several independent wrestlers featured on the Canadian television documentary series Wrestling Reality along with her former trainer Gary Williams. She was one of two female wrestlers profiled in the series, the other being another Wildman Academy graduate Purity Saint, and was one of several of Williams' former students to appear on the show including her ex-boyfriend Tommy Ozbourne. Her strained relationship with Ozbourne was a major focus of the series as well as her experiences as a female wrestler on the Canadian "indy circuit".

Purity Saint would dominate the majority of their matches together, specifically at house shows in Kentville, Nova Scotia and in Moncton, Saint John and Sussex, New Brunswick. However, Hanakowski did defeat Purity Saint in a mixed tag team match with Zero against her and Scott Savage at the KC Irving Regional Center in Bathurst, New Brunswick. She also defeated her at the series finale, the 3rd annual Maritime Cup tournament, held in her hometown at the Halifax Forum on May 6, 2007.

Following the tour, Hanakowski joined East Coast Pro Wrestling. On September 30, 2007, she appeared for ECPW at the North Sydney Forum where she and Chris Madison lost a mixed tag team match to Scott Savage & Purity Saint. She suffered a minor injury during her match when a move by Scott Savage caused some bleeding. Also on the card was "Kowboy" Mike Hughes, Duke MacIsaac, Robert Roode and Tito Santana. At the end of the year, she sold her house and moved to Western Canada.

=== Tony Condello's "Death Tour" ===
In early 2008, she accepted an offer from Tony Condello's to join his annual "Death Tour" of Inuit communities in northern Manitoba. On the tour included some of the top independent wrestlers in Canada including Vance Nevada, Adrian Walls, Kyle Sebastian and Amazing Grace (Alberta), Johnny Obsession, The Mauler and Gurv & Harv Sihra (British Columbia), Alex North and Bryan "The Axe" Lewis (Quebec), Scott Savage (Nova Scotia) and T-Bone (Newfoundland).

The tour is well known for its rough conditions. Wrestlers are required to pack at least one bag of food to last them the entire tour. There are also no hotel accommodations with wrestlers having to either sleep in cars on the side of the road or at venues they perform. Hanakowski was quoted in a February 2008 interview, "Really, right now I'm not sure what to think. I've read the books, heard the horror stories, but still immediately said yes when it was offered. There was never a doubt in my mind, my hope is just to learn. With so much time on the road and in the company of some great names like Condello and Vance, I just hope to soak up as much information as I can. The kind of stuff you learn on tour sticks with you and really changes the wrestler that you become. I'm really excited to see what happens."

Hanakowski's primary opponent during the tour was Amazing Grace and included at least one mixed tag team match with her and Vance Nevada against Amazing Grace & Kyle Sebastian. Afterwards, she complemented both Vance Nevada and Adrian Walls for helping her and other younger wrestlers during the tour, "The Death Tour is exhausting both physically and mentally, so it is crucial to have guys like Adrian who you can lean on when you need it. He takes pride in every one of his matches and any fan who watches him will back that up."

=== Recent years ===
Remaining in Western Canada, she appeared for WFX Wrestling to face Veronika Vice at a sold-out crowd in Winnipeg, Manitoba. This was event was a television pilot for the promotion and included Wavell Starr, Eddie Watts, Kenny Omega, Chris Mordetzky, Joey Matthews, Ultimo Dragon, Buff Bagwell, Billy Gunn, Brian Christopher and Jerry "The King" Lawler.

Hanakowski made several appearances for Extreme Canadian Championship Wrestling. On March 28, 2008, she teamed with Amazing Grace against Nicole Matthews & Portia Perez in Surrey, British Columbia. She also lost to Purity Saint at that same event. The following night in Vancouver, she lost to Nicole Matthews in a match for the SuperGirls Championship. She again lost to Purity Saint at this event. She and Amazing Grace also had matches in PowerZone Wrestling and Stampede Wrestling during April. On May 7 in Lethbridge, Alberta, she and Beautiful Bobby lost to Zero & Amazing Grace in a mixed tag team match for PowerZone Wrestling at the LCC DA Electric Barn. As a result of their loss, Beautiful Bobby was forced to wear a dress for the rest of the summer.

Returning to the Maritimes, Hanakowski appeared at a show for East Coast Pro Wrestling's Island Invasion to wrestle Miss Danyah at the North Sydney Forum in Sydney, Nova Scotia on June 1, 2008. World Wrestling Entertainment wrestlers Al Snow, Kip James and former Wrestling Reality co-stars Gary Williams and Brody Steele were also on the show. That summer, she and She Nay Nay also returned for Grand Prix Wrestling's tour of the Maritimes.

On May 1, 2009, Hanakowski performed at a special fundraiser, Wrestling For Literacy, at the Clairmont Community School in Clairmont, Alberta. The event was expected to raise between $3,000-$5,000. She faced Raven Lake at an event for All Star Wrestling in North Vancouver, British Columbia on November 13, 2009.
