= Richard Charland =

Canadian professional wrestler (born 1956)

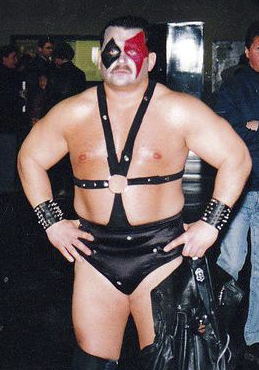
- Charland in 1991, as "Blast".

Personal information
- Born: September 26, 1956 (age 69) Montreal, Quebec, Canada

Professional wrestling career
- Ring name(s): Blast; Richard Charland; Richard 'Le Manifique'; The Tempest; Garth Vader; Mauler Malone
- Billed height: 5 ft 11 in (180 cm)
- Billed weight: 271 lb (123 kg)
- Trained by: Edouard Carpentier; Mad Dog Vachon; Omer Marchessault; Luigi Macera
- Debut: 1972
- Retired: 2000

Richard Charland (born September 26, 1956) is a Canadian professional wrestler.

== Professional wrestling career ==
=== Early career (1972–1980) ===
Richard Charland became a wrestler with the encouragement by Mad Dog Vachon. The mat legend had met Charland, as a youngster, who was studying judo, and told him to consider professional wrestling as an option. Charland listened, and took up amateur wrestling for a few years before turning pro in 1972, at the young age of 16. He debuted in the Montreal-based Grand Prix Wrestling, and beat Pat Gerard Jr. in his first match.

In 1974, he wrestled his first overseas tour for International Wrestling Enterprise in Japan, under the name The Tempest. In 1975, he would move to Toronto, to wrestle for Maple Leaf Wrestling. After a year in Toronto, he went to the United States in 1976, wrestling for The Sheik's Big Time Wrestling in Detroit, under the name Mauler Malone. He would remain in Detroit for nearly two years, before returning home to Montreal in 1977, and made a brief return to Detroit in 1979.

=== Lutte Internationale (1980–1987) ===
In 1980, Charland joined the upstart Lutte Internationale in Montreal. Soon after, he won his first title, the Canadian International Tag Team Championship, with Len Shelley. A year later, he and Shelley would lose the titles to Swede Hanson and Le Bourreau, but regained the titles the next year. However, their second reign wouldn't last as long as their first, as they lost the titles months later to Gino Brito and Rick McGraw.

In 1984, Charland would return to Japan to wrestle for the shoot-style Universal Wrestling Federation. While there, he would wrestle the likes of Mach Hayato, Rusher Kimura, Ryuma Go, Kazuo Yamazaki, and Super Tiger. After a single tour, he returned home to Montreal.

In May 1985, Charland won his third Canadian International Tag Team title, this time with King Tonga. However, his reign lasted over two weeks, before losing them to The Fabulous Rougeau Brothers. In August 1985, he wrestled a World Wrestling Federation house show in Toronto, losing to Dino Bravo. In October 1986, he regained the Canadian International Tag Team title for the fourth time, this time with Sheik Ali. His reign would last nearly four months, before losing them to Armand Rougeau and Dan Kroffat. Two months later, he regained the titles for the fifth and final time, with Chuck Simms. He and Simms would be the final champions, as Lutte Internationale closed down in June 1987.

=== World Wrestling Federation (1988–1990) ===
From 1988 to mid 1990, Charland wrestled for the WWF as a jobber on Canadian and occasionally New York house shows. His first television appearance took place at a taping of Maple Leaf Wrestling on July 24, 1988, losing to Terry Taylor. He again appeared on the December 25, 1989 episode of Prime Time Wrestling and defeated Barry Horowitz at the Maple Leaf Gardens.

=== All Japan Pro Wrestling (1990) ===
In August 1990, he returned to Japan to wrestle a tour for All Japan Pro Wrestling, teaming with Eric Embry to take part in a tournament for the vacant All Asia Tag Team Championship, the team lost all four of their matches. On September 7, Charland lost to Haruka Eigen in his final match.

=== Late career (1991–2003) ===
Returning to the Montreal independent circuit, Charland adopted the moniker "Blast" in late 1991 in an attempt to resurrect the Demolition name and gimmick with Bill Eadie as Ax, but were eventually sent a cease and desist letter by the WWF. Charland also served as the French commentator with Marc Blondin for WCW for a time.

After 1991, Charland began to cut back on his wrestling schedule, as he began working in construction, but still remained semi-active. In February 1994, he wrestled a WWF house show in Toronto, losing to Owen Hart. In July 1995, he wrestled a couple independent shows, wrestling Abdullah The Butcher. In April 1997, he wrestled a Montreal house show for World Championship Wrestling, teaming with Jacques Comptois in a loss to Martin and Serge Rolland. In 1999, Charland joined Jacques Rougeau's Lutte Internationale 2000, where he remained active until the promotion's closure in 2003.

== Championships and accomplishments ==
- Lutte Internationale
  - Canadian International Tag Team Championship (5 times) – with Len Shelley (2 times), King Tonga (1 time), Sheik Ali (1 time), and Chuck Simms (1 time)

== See also ==
- Demolition
