= Hangman Hughes =

Canadian professional wrestler (born 1974)

Personal information
- Born: Mike Hughes; November 7, 1974 (age 51) Stratford, Prince Edward Island, Canada

Professional wrestling career
- Ring name(s): Cowboy Hughes; Mike Hughes
- Billed height: 6 ft 5 in (1.96 m)
- Billed weight: 256 lb (116 kg)
- Billed from: Paradise Island, Prince Edward Island, Canada
- Debut: 1999

Mike Hughes (born November 17, 1974) is a Canadian professional wrestler, better known by his ring name, Hangman Hughes. Hughes has competed on the North American independent promotions throughout the late 1990s and early 2000s as a co-founder and mainstay of Real Action Wrestling as part of the heel stable the "Kardinal Sinners" which includes "The Natural" Bobby Rude, Kingman and the Acadian Giant. Hughes briefly appeared with World Wrestling Entertainment in 2003 and performed for the Puerto Rico-based International Wrestling Association in the mid-2000s.

== Professional wrestling career ==
=== Early career ===
Born on November 17, 1974, in Stratford, Prince Edward Island, Hughes met Edge, Christian and Glen Kulka at a local gym while touring Canadian independent promotions during the late 1990s. After expressing interest in a professional career, the three encouraged him and Kulka suggested contacting promoter Emile Dupre to begin training.

During 1998, Hughes began training under "Handsome" Hubert Gallant and the Cuban Assassin among other wrestlers in Dupre's Grand Prix promotion in Shediac, New Brunswick (he would later befriend fellow student Kingman, both of whom would eventually become charter members of Kardinal Sinners two years later).

=== Real Action Wrestling ===
Making his debut in Grand Prix Wrestling in 1999 later touring with Leo Burke and The Beast, he traveled to the United States for a brief stint in EWA before returning to the Maritime territory and establishing Real Action Wrestling with promoter Skot Gallant that same year. Although planning to tour Puerto Rico, he was convinced by Gallant to jump to RAW and help promote the promotion resulting in Grand Prix promoter Emile Dupre blacklisting Hughes from the promotion and the Maritime territory.

After the promotion was sold to Warren Olsen in 2000, Hughes stayed with the promotion and eventually won the promotion's heavyweight championship. During the next two years, he and the heel stable "Kardinal Sinners" including "The Natural" Bobby Rude, Kingman and the Acadian Giant dominated the promotion until its close in July 2002.

=== Recent years ===
After competing on the independent circuit for a time, he began wrestling semi-regularly for the British promotion All-Star Wrestling in January 2002. Making an appearance on WWE Heat in May 2003, he would later compete in the first ever Maritime Cup tournament in October 2003 making it all the way to finals before losing to current Smackdown Live star Bobby Roode.

In early 2004, he would be brought into the International Wrestling Association in Puerto Rico by Luke Williams. Facing many of the top stars in the promotion including Apolo and Ricky Banderas, he would eventually win the promotion's Hardcore title. Hughes would then get the invitation to participate in the prestigious Catch Tournament held in Hanover Germany alongside of such notables as Dave Taylor, Kendo Kashin, Robbie Brookside, Lash LeRoux, and Rick Steiner. Following the tournament he returned to Puerto Rico.

In 2006, Hughes travelled to California to help Japanese MMA fighter, Kazuyuki Fujita train for his return to PRIDE on May 5 in a bout against England's James "The Colossus" Thompson. Fujita went on to win the bout via KO in round 1 at 8:25. Hughes then traveled to Japan in September to compete at New Japan Pro-Wrestling's G1 Climax, where he defeat Japanese legend Mr.Saito in his debut at Sumo Hall under the name Hangman Hughes. Hughes later returned to Japan and toured with New Japan Pro-Wrestlings often tag partnered with Harry Smith. In 2007, he appeared on the documentary television series "Wrestling Reality" which featured many Canadian independent wrestlers including "Wildman" Gary Williams, Sidewinder, Marisa, Titus and Krysta Lynn Scott. Hughes then appeared in another documentary TV series named after his and Peter Smiths Tag team "The Kardinal Sinners" alongside Gary Williams, Smith, Rick Doyle and British wrestler Frankie Sloan.

He and Brody Steele, a former member of the Kardinal Sinners, defeated Yoshihiro Tajiri and Hiroshi Nagao for the WWA Korea World Tag Team Championship on May 14, 2007.

On September 30, 2007, he defeated Duke MacIsaac in North Sydney, Nova Scotia to win the ECPW Heavyweight Championship.

Hughes also spent time in the province of Newfoundland & Labrador as part of Legend City Wrestling from 2011-2015 where he was spent time booking and running the company alongside the company's primary owner, Dan Bjorkdahl. Hughes left the company at a time when they were having financial hardship, and had a falling out with the company owner in 2015. The company ceased operations early in 2016.

=== Red Rock Wrestling ===
In 2009, Hughes and his wife started their own wrestling promotion called Red Rock Wrestling (RRW). The first show was on May 29, 2009, at Stratford Town Hall Gymnasium in Stratford, Prince Edward Island. He was awarded the promotions heavyweight championship, which he defended against Titus in a winning effort. RRW's second show was held on Friday, September 25, 2009 at Stratford Town Hall. He teamed up with Robbie McAllister, defeating the team of Titus and Brody Steele.

As of 2019, Hughes has won the RRW Heavyweight Championship a record seven times.

=== Personal life ===
Hughes married his longtime girlfriend, Sheri Atkinson, in 2010 and they reside on PEI.

== Championships and accomplishments ==
- East Coast Pro Wrestling

- ECPW Heavyweight Championship (1 time, current)

- Real Action Wrestling

- RAW Heavyweight Championship (4 times)

- Legend City Wrestling

- LCW Heavyweight Championship (3 times)

- International Wrestling Association

- IWA Hardcore Championship (2 times)

- MainStream Wrestling Entertainment

- MSW Championship (1 time)

- Innovative Hybrid Wrestling

- IHW Heavyweight Championship* (1 time)

- Pro Wrestling Illustrated

- PWI ranked him # 344 of the 500 best singles wrestlers of the PWI 500 in 2005

- Ultimate Championship Wrestling

- UCW Tag Team Championship (1 time) - with "Wildman" Gary Williams

- New Breed Wrestling

- NBW Heavyweight Championship (1 time)

- Red Rock Wrestling

- RRW Heavyweight Championship (7 times, current)
