= Stephen Petitpas =

Canadian professional wrestler (born 1957)

Personal information
- Born: November 14, 1957 (age 68) Soest, North Rhine-Westphalia, West Germany

Professional wrestling career
- Ring name(s): Canadian Lumberjack; Sheik Ali; Stephen Petitpas; Steven Pearsay; Big Stephen Petitpas
- Billed height: 6 ft 3 in (191 cm)
- Billed weight: 275 lb (125 kg)
- Trained by: Emile Dupree
- Debut: 1974
- Retired: 1995

Stephen Petitpas (born November 14, 1957) is a Canadian professional wrestler.

== Professional wrestling career ==
Petitpas was born in Soest, West Germany. He grew up in a French household in Shediac, New Brunswick. Petitpas lived in a small Acadian house with a professional wrestler, Emile Duprée, living across the street. Petitpas would watch Duprée train in his backyard. By the time he was thirteen and fourteen, Petitpas was putting up the ring for Duprée. By the age of 15 he was 6 feet 3 inches tall and weighed 220 pounds. Petitpas refereed some matches for Atlantic Grand Prix Wrestling (AGPW), Duprée's wrestling promotion. When some wrestlers quit AGPW, Petitpas became involved as a wrestler at Duprée's invitation. While in the Maritimes, Petitpas always wrestled as a face (fan favorite).

Petitpas traveled around the world to compete during his career, including wrestling tours of Germany, Japan, and India. He had five matches against Ric Flair for the NWA World Heavyweight Championship but was unable to win the title belt. In AGPW, Petitpas held several titles, including the AGPW International Heavyweight Championship, which he won in 1985 by defeating Super Destroyer. He also won the AGPW Maritimes Heavyweight Championship on two occasions, winning the inaugural title and later defeating Super Destroyer to regain the belt.

Wrestling in the Montreal-based Lutte Internationale, Petitpas competed under the ring name Sheik Ali. He portrayed a heel (villain) character and was managed by Eddie "The Brain" Creatchman and "Pretty Boy" Floyd Creatchman. He competed against such wrestlers as Rick Martel, Dino Bravo, and Abdullah the Butcher. He was given an opportunity to compete for the World Wrestling Federation (WWF) but did not get to wrestle in any of the matches because Martel, who ran Lutte International, became concerned about how they would impact Petitpas's schedule and status in Lutte International. While competing for the company, Petitpas teamed with Richard Charland in 1986 to win the Canadian International Tag Team Championship by defeating Dan Kroffat and Tom Zenk.

When Duprée decided to stop promoting shows, he sold AGPW to Petitpas and Leo Burke. In 1988 and 1989, he ran shows in addition to operating the Atlantic Wrestling School. His most famous trainee at the school was Robert Maillet, who went on to wrestle in the WWF as Kurrgan. Petitpas found it difficult to compete with the WWF in the Maritimes and ultimately closed his promotion.

Canadian wrestler Buddy Lane has called Petitpas's career "the biggest waste of talent ever" in wrestling, as Petitpas was given opportunities to wrestle for larger companies but chose to remain in the Maritimes. He has three children, a daughter and two sons.

== Championships and accomplishments ==
- Atlantic Grand Prix Wrestling
  - AGPW International Heavyweight Championship (1 time)
  - AGPW Maritimes Heavyweight Championship (2 times)
  - AGPW North American Tag Team Champion (3 times) - with The Great Malumba (1 time) and Leo Burke (2 times)
- Lutte Internationale
  - Canadian International Tag Team Championship (1 time) - with Richard Charland
