= Hubert Gallant =

Canadian professional wrestler (born 1955)

Personal information
- Born: Hubert Gallant; November 12, 1955 (age 70) Shediac, New Brunswick, Canada

Professional wrestling career
- Ring name(s): Hubert Gallant; Larry Roberts
- Billed height: 5 ft 10 in (178 cm)
- Billed weight: 220 lb (100 kg)
- Trained by: Emile Dupree; Leo Burke
- Debut: May 2, 1975
- Retired: 1986

Hubert Gallant (born November 12, 1955) is a Canadian retired professional wrestler and trainer who competed in North American regional promotions during the 1970s and early 1980s including Stampede Wrestling and Emile Dupree's Grand Prix Wrestling as well short stints in the National Wrestling Alliance, specifically the Mid-South and Carolinas regions. Among the wrestlers he trained are "Wildman" Gary Williams and Hangman Hughes.

== Professional wrestling career ==
=== Early career ===
Born in the rural countryside on the outskirts of Shediac, New Brunswick, Gallant played hockey during his teenage years and, often attending wrestling events at the Jean-Louis Lévesque Arena, was a childhood fan of wrestler Leo Burke growing up.

Gallant had been working as a machine operator when, at age 19, he contacted Rudy Kay to be trained as a professional wrestler. Gallant, who at the time weighed 160 lb (73 kg), was advised to increase his weight and began training with a local bodybuilder eventually he weighing in at around 200 lb (91 kg) after six months.

Beginning his training with Emile Dupree and the Cuban Assassin in late 1974, he eventually made his professional debut as "Larry Roberts" wrestling a 15-minute match on May 2, 1975. He would later tour the Maritimes with Dupree's Grand Prix Wrestling and International Wrestling during the summer and in Montreal before the end of the year.

After spending early 1976 competing in International Wrestling, Leo Burke was able to arrange Gallant to tour the United States with the National Wrestling Alliance wrestling in the Kansas City-area and Jim Crockett Promotions in North Carolina as "Herb Gallant". In early 1977, he would team with Keith Franks in a tag team match against Ric Flair and Greg Valentine on January 1 and, following their loss, he would be defeated by Franks five days later. He would also team with Bill Dromo against Kim Duk & The Masked Superstar as well as with Rick McGraw against the Hollywood Blondes during the next two months.

=== Stampede Wrestling ===
After returning to Canada, Gallant began wrestling for Stu Hart's Stampede Wrestling during the summer of 1977. While in Calgary, Gallant gained a strong following in the promotion and was credited by promoters Stu Hart and Bob Leonard as one of their key stars during his 8-year career in the promotion feuding with the Cuban Assassin, Duke Myers and often teaming with Leo Burke against Bret Hart and The Dynamite Kid.

After a brief return to Charlotte during 1978, in which he wrestled his former trainer Rudy Kay in a 30-min. match, he began teaming with Moose Morowski in Calgary and Charlotte. Splitting his time between the Maritimes and Calgary, he declined offers to tour Japan and Germany instead wishing to remain in Calgary. He later teamed with Keith Hart to win the Stampede Wrestling International tag team titles from the Cuban Assassin and Norman Frederick Charles III on April 29 before losing the titles to Raul and Fidel Castillo September 9, 1978.

With Leo Burke, together they advanced to the finals of a championship tournament to fill the vacant Stampede International tag team titles before losing to The Dynamite Kid & Mr. Sekigawa on December 21, 1979. The two would win the Grand Prix Wrestling North American tag team titles on June 26, 1980, before losing the titles to the Cuban Assassin and Bobby Bass that same year.

During 1981, he defeated Bruce Hart for the Stampede Wrestling British Commonwealth Mid-Heavyweight Championship on March 13 and soon began teaming with Kerry Brown against Bruce and Keith Hart the following month before losing a 6-man tag team match with Brown and Jude Rosenbloom against Jim Neidhart, Bruce and Keith Hart in Edmonton, Alberta on April 18.

Losing the title to former tag team partner Keith Hart on May 9, the following year he would team with Jude Rosenbloom losing to Hercules Ayala & Kung Fu in the opening rounds of the 1982 Stampede International Tag Team Tournament in March 1982.

In 1984, he began teaming with Danny Davis defeating Bruce Hart & Davey Boy Smith on February 27 to regain the tag team titles although the titles were eventually vacated following a match with Philip Lafond & Ben Bassarab several weeks later. He and Davis would fail to regain the titles at the later tournament for the vacant titles being eliminated by The British Bulldogs in the semi-finals on March 31, 1984.

After undergoing back surgery later that year, Gallant spent six months recuperating before returning to active competition. However, after teaming with Kerry Brown to lose to Wayne Ferris & Ron Starr in the tournament finals for the Stampede International tag team titles in October 1985, limited mobility as well as the birth of his first son forced him into semi-retirement touring with Grand Prix Wrestling during the next two years before retiring in 1986.

=== Retirement ===
After his retirement, Gallant settled down with his wife Claire and his two sons Jocelin and Jason in Cap-Pele, New Brunswick where he resumed his career as a machine operator hauling wood and buying woodlots although he would continue to train younger wrestlers for Grand Prix Wrestling during the 1990s, most notably Gary Williams and Mike Hughes.

An accomplished musician, he has also appeared as a guitarist playing with Francis Cormier and the Bluegrass Diamonds while touring the Maritimes provinces.

== Championships and accomplishments ==
- TransCanada Wrestling
  - Maritime Tag Team Championship (1 time) - with Leo Burke 1977
- Grand Prix Wrestling
  - GPW North American Tag Team Championship (1 time) - with Leo Burke
- International Wrestling
  - Global Tag Team Championship (2 or 3 times) - with Rudy Kay
- Stampede Wrestling
  - Stampede British Commonwealth Mid-Heavyweight Championship (1 time)
  - Stampede International Tag Team Championship (2 times) - with Keith Hart and Danny Davis
