= Cuban Assassin =

Cuban Assassin may refer to one of the following professional wrestlers:

- David Sierra (born 1960), professional wrestler, a longtime veteran of the Puerto Rico-based World Wrestling Council
- Ángel Acevedo (born 1945), professional wrestler appearing with Atlantic Grand Prix Wrestling, Central States Wrestling and Stampede Wrestling
