= Grand Prix Wrestling =

Professional wrestling promotion

- Acronym: GPW, AGPW
- Founded: 1960s; 2001
- Headquarters: Moncton, New Brunswick
- Founder: Emile Duprée
- Owner(s): Emile Duprée (1977–1986?; 2001–2023); Paul Peller (1986–1992?); Mike Zinck (2001)
- Formerly: Atlantic Grand Prix Wrestling (1977–1991, 2015, 2017); Canadian Championship Wrestling (1992)

Grand Prix Wrestling (GPW) was a professional wrestling promotion run and owned by Emile Duprée. It toured parts of New Brunswick, Prince Edward Island and Nova Scotia. It has no connection with Paul Vachon's Grand Prix Wrestling promotion of Montreal in the 1970s.

== History ==
=== Atlantic Grand Prix Wrestling ===
Originally known as Atlantic Grand Prix Wrestling (AGPW), the regional circuit has been around since the early 1960s. During the 60s and the 70s AGPW was so popular it became a hit in the Maritimes. AGPW cards were held in Moncton, New Brunswick on Monday nights, Montague, Prince Edward Island on Tuesday nights, Halifax, Nova Scotia on Thursdays, Berwick, Nova Scotia on Saturday evenings and along other small towns in New Brunswick, Nova Scotia and Prince Edward Island.

Every summer, there were two big championships up for grabs: The United States Heavyweight Championship and the North American Tag Team Championship. Others included the European Heavyweight Championship and the Maritime Heavyweight Championship. The European Heavyweight Championship was held more by Killer Karl Krupp than any other wrestler and The Maritime Heavyweight Title was held most often by Stephen Petitpas. During the late 1980s, the United States Heavyweight Championship was changed to the International Heavyweight Championship.

=== Rising Sun In The Maritimes Tour ===
Atlantic Grand Prix Wrestling returned to the Maritimes in 2013 for a summer tour. The roster featured former WWE wrestler Rene Dupree, All Japan Pro Wrestling star Seiya Sanada, She Nay Nay, Bellatrix star Erin Angel, midget wrestlers Lil' Fabio and Lil' Poppa Pump, The Masked Thunderbolt, Kwan Chang, Jeremy Prophet, Bobby Sharp, Spiderman and Japanese star, Daiki Inaba. The tour kicked off in Borden-Carleton, Prince Edward Island with a show featuring a special guest appearance by Japanese legend The Great Muta.

The tour continued with Prince Edward Island shows in Souris and O'Leary. Nova Scotia shows included: Springhill, Bridgewater, two in Berwick, Tatamagouche, Truro, Cheticamp, North Sydney, Baddeck and Antigonish. The New Brunswick portion of the tour included shows in: Cocagne (three times), Neguac, Lameque, Chipman, Fredericton Junction, Blacks Harbour, Baie St. Anne, Minto, Petit-Rocher, Doaktown and Sunny Corner. The tour was very successful and it brought a lot of escalation toward what is now known as the 2014 New Era Tour that featured Rene Dupree, Yasufumi Nakanoue, Butcher Vachon, Bobby Sharp, Jeremy Prophet, the return of the Cuban Assassin and many more. Towns featured on the tour included Neguac, Black's Harbour and Minto (New Brunswick), O'Leary, Borden-Carleton and Souris (Prince Edward Island), and Sydney, Baddeck, Berwick, Truro and Springhill (Nova Scotia).

=== Eastern Canada Tour ===
In May 2015, AGPW held a tour across Nova Scotia, New Brunswick and Prince Edward Island.

== Alumni ==
Male wrestlers

Birth name:	Ring name(s):	Tenure:	Notes
Ángel Acevedo	The Cuban Assassin / The Cuban Commando	1979–1980; 1982; 1984–1985; 1989; 1992; 1999–2000	
Richard Acevedo	The Cuban Assassin / Cuban Assassin #2	1999; 2005–2006; 2008	
Kevin Ali	Mentallo	2001	
Orest Antonation	Bill Cody	1982–1983	
Dennis Baldock	Bobby Bass	1980; 1982	
Craig Baranieski	Dino Ventura	1987-1988	
Roland Barriault	Frenchie Lamont	2005–2006	
Vince Billotto	Vinnie Valentino	1988	
Bob Brown^{†}	Bob Brown	1983; 1988; 1990	
Kerry Brown ^{†}	Rick Valentine	1982–1983	
Masahiro Chono	Tokyo Chono	1988	
Allen Coage^{†}	Bad News Brown	1997	
Adam Copeland	Sexton Hardcastle	1997	
Leonce Cormier^{†}	Leo Burke	1979–1980; 1982–1983; 1988–1992; 1998–1999	
Jean-Louis Cormier^{†}	Rudy Kay	1982–1983	
Romeo Cormier^{†}	Bobby Kay	1982–1983; 1990	
Yvon Cormier^{†}	The Beast	1982; 1988–1990; 1999–2000	
John Cozman^{†}	Danny Young	1984	
Covey Christ	Covey Christ, Maritime Messiah	2017	
Ruben Cruz	Hercules Ayala Cortez	1982	
Scott D'Amore	Scott D'Amore / Masked Super Warrior #2	1997–1998	
Sean Dunster	Rick the Bruiser	1998	
Gerard Ethifier	Gerry Morrow	1989	
Adam Filangeri	Phil Atlas	2008	
Steve Finley^{†}	Wayne Gillis	1988–1989	
Clifford Fraser	Farmer Brooks	1988	
Rudolph Freed	Rudy Diamond	1988	
Jean Gagné^{†}	Frenchy Martin	1983	
Gary Gallant	Wildman Austin	1997; 1998–2000; 2005–2006	
Hubert Gallant	Hubert Gallant	1980; 1982–1983	
Damian Gibbs	Damian Gibbs	2015	
Edward Giovannetti	Lenny Montana	1983–1984	
Emile Goguen	Emile Dupre	1979–1980; 1988	
Jeff Goguen	Jeff Duprée	2005–2006; 2008	
René Goguen	René Duprée / René Rougeau	1998–2001; 2006; 2008; 2015; 2017	
Jose Gomez	Tony Russo	1983–1984	
Archie Gouldie^{†}	Archie Gouldie	1984	
Troy Gregory	T Gregory Windham	1987-1989	
Scott Grimez	Giant Pharaoh	2015	
Neil Guay	Big John the Quebec Lumberjack	1982	
Junji Hirata	Sonny Two Rivers	1997–1998	
Joseph Hitchen	Joe E. Legend	1998–1999	
Steven Hoy	Steve Casey	1989	
Mike Hughes	Mike Hughes	1999; 2004	
Scott Ingraham	Scott Savage	2005	
Donald Jardine^{†}	The Spoiler	1983	
Gary Jessome	Duke MacIsaac	2005	
Ron Johnson	Bull Johnson	1983	
David Kochen	Buddy Lane	1984–1985; 1988–1990	
Yusuke Kodama	Yusuke Kodama	2015	
Paul Koziar	Flesh Gordon	2001	
Jody Kristofferson	Jody Kristofferson	2015	
Glen Kulka	Glen Kulka	1997	
Larry Liger	The Great Malumba	1982–1983; 1988	
Michael Lozanski^{†}	Mike Lozanski	1990	
Ryan Mader	Lincoln Steen	2005	
	2006-2017		
Robert Maillet	The Acadian Giant / Kurrgan	1991–1992; 1999–2000	
Paul Marcoux	Hans Schultz	2000–2001	
Vern May	Vance Nevada	2001	
Karl Moffat	Hans Herman	1985	
George Momberg^{†}	Karl Von Krupp	1979; 1982	
Devon Nicholson	Hannibal	2017	
Robert Nutt^{†}	Ron Starr	1989; 1991	
Gregory Nykoliation	Eddie Watts	1988–1989; 1991–1992; 2000; 2005	
Tod Olsen	Ole Olsen	1991	
Paul Pellerin	Paul Peller	1979–1980; 1982–1983; 1988–1990; 1992	
Corey Peloquin	Chi Chi Cruz	1990; 1999–2000	
Stephen Petitpas	Steve Petitpas	1979–1980	
Michel Pigeon^{†}	Jos LeDuc	1984	
Lanny Poffo^{†}	Lanny Poffo	1983	
Alastair Ralphs	Buddy Austin	2008	
Timothy Reid	Timothy Flowers	1990	
William Reso	Christian Cage	1997	
Steven Romero^{†}	Jay Youngblood	1983	
Robert Roode Jr.	Bobby Roode	2000	
Victor Rosettani	Vic Rossitani / Vic Rossi	1983	
Marc Roussel	Marko Estrada	2005; 2015	
André René Roussimoff	André the Giant		
Seiya Sanada	Seiya Sanada	2015	
David Savelli	Spiderman	2015	
Aaron Schlosser	Ruffy Silverstein	2001	
Mark Sciarra	Rip Rogers	1988; 1990; 1997	
Robert Sharp	Bobby Sharp	2015	
Mike Shaw^{†}	Man Mountain Mike	1985	
David Sherwin^{†}	Goldie Rogers	1979–1980; 1991–1992	
Reginald Siki	Sweet Daddy Siki	1983–1984	
Chuck Simpson	Chuck Simms	1999	
Robert Smedley	Bobby Blaze	1991–1992	
Peter Smith	The Mighty Hercules	1998–1999	
Tom Stanton^{†}	The Super Destroyer	1985	
Rick Taras	Rick Patterson	1985; 1992	
Roger Theriault	Butcher Vachon	1988–1990; 1992; 1998–1999; 2006; 2008	
Edward White^{†}	Sailor White	1988; 1991	
Chad Wicks	Chad Dick	2006	
Jay York^{†}	The Alaskan	1979; 1982–1983	
Unknown	Alex North / The French Mystic / The French Mystique	2008	
Unknown	Antonio Rico	1980	
Unknown	The Brute	1979; 1981	
Unknown	Carlos Valderama	2017	
Unknown	Cliff McDonald	2000	
Unknown	Greg Evans	1997	
Unknown	Jesse Bieber	2015	
Unknown	Iron Mike Lyons	2006	
Unknown	Jonathan Holliday	1988	
Unknown	Jon Michaels	1997	
Julien Young	Julien Young	2005	
Eric Doucet	Markus Burke	2015	
Unknown	Mike McFly / Mad Dog McFly / Mad Dog Neilson / Stan Neilson	2000–2001	
Unknown	Pat Brady	1989	
Unknown	Randy Scott	1983	
Unknown	The Rebel	2006	
Unknown	Rico Frederico	1991	
Unknown	Robert Scarpino	2001	
Unknown	Rock Evans	2001	
Unknown	Rodney Blackbeard	1997	
Unknown	Russian Bigfoot	1988	
Unknown	Ryan Rogan	2017	
Ryan Babineau	Ryan Storm/Wrestling Spider-Man	2005–2006	
Unknown	Scott Sandlin	1989	
Troy Merrick	Sexton Phoenix	2006	
Unknown	T.G. Stone	1983	
Mathieu Titus	Titus	2005–2006	
Todd McPhee	Todd Douglas	2000; 2005–2006	
Unknown	Todd McPhee	1991–1992	
Unknown	Tommy Osbourne	2006	
Unknown	The UFO	1979; 1988	
Unknown	Z-ro	2006	

Female wrestlers

Birth name:	Ring name(s):	Tenure:	Notes
Athanasia Alexopoulos	She Nay Nay	2006; 2008	
Krista Hanakowski	Krysta Kiniski	2006	
Peggy Lee^{†}	Peggy Lee	1983	
Erin Marshall	Erin Angel	2008	
Betty Wade-Murphy	Joyce Grable	1982–1983	
Unknown	Éve	2017	
Unknown	Kat Von Heez	2015	
Unknown	Penny Mitchel	1982	
Unknown	Stacy Thibault	2017	
Unknown	Tessa Blanchard	2015	

Midget wrestlers

Birth name:	Ring name(s):	Tenure:	Notes
Shigeri Akabane^{†}	Little Tokyo	1983	
Marcel Gauthier^{†}	Sky Low Low	1980; 1988	
Harold Lang^{†}	Cowboy Lang	1983	
Louis Waterhouse, Jr.	Little Louie	1999	

Stables and tag teams

Tag team/Stable(s)	Members	Tenure(s)
The Burkes	Bobby Kay and Rudy Kay	1982
The Cuban Assassins	Angelo Castro and Raiul Castro	1982
The Cuban Commandos	The Cuban Assassin and Gerry Morrow	1989
The Masked Super Warriors	Masked Super Warrior #1 and Masked Super Warrior #2	1997
The Rock 'n' Roll Rebel Express	Dino Ventura and Kid Dynamite	1987

== Championships ==
Key

Reign	The reign number for the specific set of wrestlers listed
Event	The event promoted by the respective promotion in which the championship was won
N/A	The specific information is not known
—	Used for vacated reigns so as not to count it as an official reign
(n)	Indicates that a title change took place "no later than" the date listed. (Note: Documentation of the specific date of a title change is not found but documentation of the champion holding the title on that date/in that period.)
	Indicates that there was a period where the lineage is undocumented due to the lack of written documentation

=== AGPW International Heavyweight Championship ===
Key
No.	Overall reign number
Reign	Reign number for the specific champion
Days	Number of days held

No.	Champion	Championship change			Reign statistics		Notes	Ref.
No.	Champion	Date	Event	Location	Reign	Days	Notes	Ref.
2	Leaping Lanny	1978 (NLT)	GPW show	N/A	1	N/A		
3	Randy Savage	July 18, 1978 (NLT)	GPW show	N/A	1	N/A		
Championship history is unrecorded from July 18, 1978 (NLT) to 1979.
!3	Leaping Lanny	1979	GPW show	N/A	2	N/A		
4	Randy Savage	March 13, 1979	GPW show	Halifax, Nova Scotia	2			
Championship history is unrecorded from March 13, 1979 to July, 1979 (NLT).
5	Killer Karl Krupp	July, 1979 (NLT)	GPW show	N/A	1	N/A		
Championship history is unrecorded from July, 1979 (NLT) to May 18, 1983 (NLT).
6	Frenchy Martin	May 18, 1983 (NLT)	GPW show	N/A	1	N/A		
Championship history is unrecorded from May 18, 1983 (NLT) to August 4, 1983 (NLT).
7	Leo Burke	August 4, 1983 (NLT)	GPW show	N/A	1	N/A		
Championship history is unrecorded from August 4, 1983 (NLT) to 1984.
—	Vacated	1984	—	—	—	—	Championship vacated for unknown reasons	
Championship history is unrecorded from 1984 to May 30, 1985 (NLT).
8	Super Destroyer	May 30, 1985 (NLT)	GPW show	N/A	1	N/A		
9	Killer Karl Krupp	July 10, 1985 (NLT)	GPW show	N/A	2	N/A		
10	Super Destroyer	1985	GPW show	N/A	2	N/A		
11	Steve Pettipas	1985	GPW show	N/A	1	N/A		
12	Ron Starr	1985	GPW show	N/A	1	N/A		
Championship history is unrecorded from 1985 to July, 1986 (NLT).
13	Leo Burke	July, 1986 (NLT)	GPW show	N/A	2	N/A		
14	Frenchy Martin	July, 1986 (NLT)	GPW show	Moncton, New Brunswick	2	N/A		
Championship history is unrecorded from July, 1986 (NLT) to June 19, 1987 (NLT).
15	Ron Starr	June 19, 1987 (NLT)	GPW show	N/A	2	N/A		
Championship history is unrecorded from June 19, 1987 (NLT) to September 1987.
—	Vacated	September 1987	—	—	—	—	Championship vacated for unknown reasons	
Championship history is unrecorded from September 1987 to July 14, 1987 (NLT).
16	Rip Rogers	July 14, 1987 (NLT)	GPW show	N/A	1	N/A		
17	Leo Burke	August 18, 1988	GPW show	Halifax, Nova Scotia	3	N/A		
18	Ron Starr	1989	GPW show	N/A	3	N/A		
19	Dynamite Kid	1989	GPW show	N/A	1	N/A		
Championship history is unrecorded from 1989 to July 1, 1987 (NLT).
20	Leo Burke	July 1, 1987 (NLT)	GPW show	N/A	4	N/A		
21	Ron Starr	July 20, 1989 (NLT)	GPW show	N/A	3	N/A		
22	Leo Burke	August 11, 1990 (NLT)	GPW show	N/A	5	N/A		
Championship history is unrecorded from August 11, 1990 (NLT) to 1990.
23	Rip Rogers	1990	GPW show	N/A	2	N/A		

=== AGPW United States Heavyweight Championship ===
Key
No.	Overall reign number
Reign	Reign number for the specific champion
Days	Number of days held
(NLT)	Championship change took place "no later than" the date listed

No.	Champion	Championship change			Reign statistics		Notes	Ref.
No.	Champion	Date	Event	Location	Reign	Days	Notes	Ref.
1	David von Schultz	June 26, 1980 (NLT)	GPW show	N/A	1	N/A		
Championship history is unrecorded from June 26, 1980 (NLT) to July, 1982 (NLT).
2	Rick Valentine	July, 1982 (NLT)	GPW show	N/A	1	N/A		
3	Leo Burke	July, 1982 (NLT)	GPW show	N/A	1	N/A		
Championship history is unrecorded from July, 1982 (NLT) to May 18, 1983 (NLT).
4	Rick Valentine	May 18, 1983 (NLT)	GPW show	N/A	2	N/A		
5	Leo Burke	July 21, 1982 (NLT)	GPW show	Halifax, Nova Scotia	2	N/A		
—	Vacated	September 1987	—	—	—	—	Held up when match between Burke and The Spoiler ended in controversy.	
7	Leo Burke	September 8, 1983	GPW show	Halifax, Nova Scotia	3	N/A	Defeated The Spoiler in a rematch for the vacant title.	
—	Deactivated	1984	—	—	—	—	Title is retired.	

=== AGPW Maritimes Heavyweight Championship ===
Key
No.	Overall reign number
Reign	Reign number for the specific champion
Days	Number of days held
(NLT)	Championship change took place "no later than" the date listed

No.	Champion	Championship change			Reign statistics		Notes	Ref.
No.	Champion	Date	Event	Location	Reign	Days	Notes	Ref.
1	Steve Pettipas	May 1984	GPW show	N/A	1	N/A		
Championship history is unrecorded from May 1984 to 1985.
2	Super Destroyer	1985	GPW show	N/A	1	N/A		
3	Steve Pettipas	1985	GPW show	N/A	2	N/A		

=== AGPW North American Tag Team Championship ===
Key
No.	Overall reign number
Reign	Reign number for the specific champion
Days	Number of days held
(NLT)	Championship change took place "no later than" the date listed

No.	Champion	Championship change			Reign statistics		Notes	Ref.
No.	Champion	Date	Event	Location	Reign	Days	Notes	Ref.
1	The Cuban Assassin and Carpetbagger	March 3, 1978	GPW show	N/A	1	N/A		
Championship history is unrecorded from March 3, 1978 to July, 1979 (NLT).
2	The Cuban Assassin and Goldie Rogers	July, 1979 (NLT)	GPW show	N/A	1	N/A		
Championship history is unrecorded from July, 1979 (NLT) to June 26, 1980 (NLT).
3	Leo Burke and Hubert Gallant	June 26, 1980 (NLT)	GPW show	N/A	1	N/A		
4	The Cuban Assassin and Bobby Bass	1980	GPW show	N/A	1	N/A		
5	Leo Burke and Steve Pettipas	August, 1980 (NLT)	GPW show	N/A	1	N/A		
Championship history is unrecorded from August, 1980 (NLT) to June 10, 1982 (NLT).
6	The Cuban Assassins (Angelo Castro and Raoul Castro)	June 10, 1982 (NLT)	GPW show	N/A	1	N/A		
Championship history is unrecorded from June 10, 1982 (NLT) to June 1, 1983 (NLT).
7	Bull Johnston and Vic Rossitani	June 1, 1983 (NLT)	GPW show	N/A	1	N/A		
8	Frenchy Martin and Rick Valentine	September, 1983 (NLT)	GPW show	N/A	1	N/A		
Championship history is unrecorded from September, 1983 (NLT) to May 1984.
9	Bob Brown and Great Pogo Langie	May 1984	GPW show	N/A	1	N/A		
Championship history is unrecorded from May 1984 to May 1984.
10	Bob Brown and Great Pogo Langie	May 1984	GPW show	N/A	1	N/A		
Championship history is unrecorded from May 1984 to 1985.
11	The Cuban Assassin and Sweet Daddy Siki	1985	GPW show	N/A	1	N/A		
Championship history is unrecorded from 1985 to July 10, 1985 (NLT).
12	Killer Karl Krupp and Hans Herman	July 10, 1985 (NLT)	GPW show	N/A	1	N/A		
—	Vacated	1985	—	—	—	—	Championship vacated for unknown reasons	
Championship history is unrecorded from 1985 to June 12, 1986 (NLT).
13	The Spoiler and Nikita Kalmikoff	June 12, 1986 (NLT)	GPW show	N/A	1	N/A		
Championship history is unrecorded from June 12, 1986 (NLT) to August 30, 1986 (NLT).
14	Leo Burke and The Cuban Assassin	August 30, 1986 (NLT)	GPW show	N/A	1	N/A		
Championship history is unrecorded from August 30, 1986 (NLT) to 1987.
15	The Rock 'n' Roll Rebel Express (Dino Ventura and Kid Dynamite)	January 2, 1987	GPW show	N/A	1	N/A		
16	Bob Brown and Rick Valentine	June 26, 1987	GPW show	N/A	1	N/A		
Championship history is unrecorded from June 26, 1987 to N/A.
17	Leo Burke and The Cuban Assassin	N/A	GPW show	N/A	2	N/A		
18	Bob Brown and Tokyo Chono	July, 1988 (NLT)	GPW show	N/A	1	N/A		
19	Leo Burke and Steve Pettipas	September 1988	GPW show	N/A	2	N/A		
Championship history is unrecorded from September 1988 to June, 1989 (NLT).
20	The Cuban Commandos (Gerry Morrow and The Cuban Assassin)	June, 1989 (NLT)	GPW show	N/A	1	N/A		
Championship history is unrecorded from June, 1989 (NLT) to 1990.
21	Leo Burke and Bobby Kay	1990	GPW show	N/A	2	N/A	Defeated Tim Flowers and Bobby Bass	
