= Maddison Miles =

Canadian wrestler and actor (born 2000)

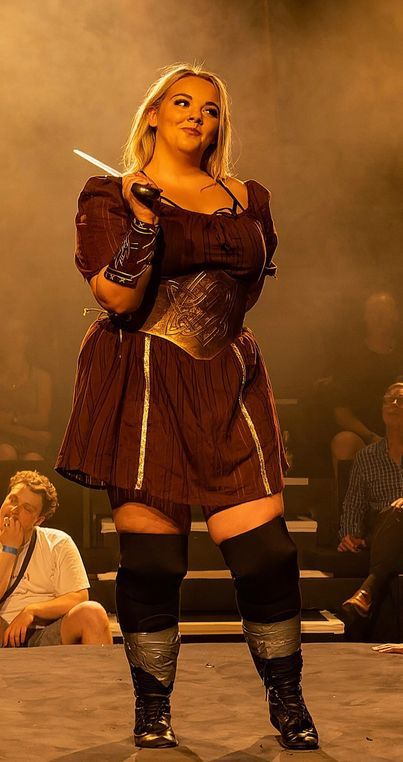
- Maddison Miles as "Freya" in Mythos: Ragnarok

Personal information
- Born: Maddison Victoria Miles; January 6, 2000 (age 26) Halifax, Nova Scotia

Professional wrestling career
- Ring name: Maddison Miles
- Billed height: 5 ft 5 in (1.65 m)
- Billed weight: 182 lb (83 kg)
- Trained by: Adam Craft; Gary Williams; Dick Durning
- Debut: November 2015

Maddison Victoria Miles (born January 6, 2000) is a Canadian independent professional wrestler and actor.

== Early life and education ==
Miles was born in Halifax, Nova Scotia, on January 6, 2000, and raised in Dartmouth, Nova Scotia. Miles love of professional wrestling began from an early age, watching WWE on television and travelling to local wrestling events with her father, Mike. She began pursuing wrestling training at age 15.

Miles graduated from Millwood High School in 2018.

== Professional wrestling career ==
=== Atlantic Canada and North America (2015–2019) ===
Miles had her debut match on November 7, 2015, in Campbellton, New Brunswick for Innovative Hybrid Wrestling.

On October 27, 2018, during her debut tour of England, Miles defeated Addy Starr to become the DOA:UK Women's Champion.

On July 19, 2019, in Moncton, New Brunswick, Miles won the 5th Maritime Cup, an eight-woman single-elimination tournament, by last defeating Saraya Knight. She was then declared the inaugural IHW Maritime Woman's Champion.

In 2019, Miles was invited to attend a WWE Tryout in Toronto, Ontario. Shortly thereafter, Miles announced she would be immigrating to England to continue advancing her wrestling career.

=== England and International Touring (2019–2024) ===
Miles was honoured by the Cauliflower Alley Club as the recipient of the 2022 Rising Star Award. The award was presented in Las Vegas, Nevada on September 27, 2022.

=== Return to Canada (2024–present) ===
In April 2025, Miles wrestled in Las Vegas on the eve of Wrestlemania 41.

== Acting career ==
Miles was the original casting for the role of Freya in the theatre production Mythos: Ragnarök, written and produced by Ed Gamester. She portrayed the role over 150 times across the globe, including tours of Australia, England, and Canada.

== Personal life ==
Miles was an outspoken advocate during the Speaking Out movement, drawing attention to abuse in Maritime wrestling.

== Championships and accomplishments ==
- DOA: United Kingdom
  - DOA: UK Women's Championship (2 times)
- Power of Wrestling
  - POW Women's Tag Team Championship (1 time) – with Kat Siren
- Pro Wrestling Illustrated
  - Ranked No. 74 in the top 100 female wrestlers in the PWI Women's 100 in 2020
- Innovative Hybrid Wrestling
  - IHW Maritime Women's Championship (1 time)
