= Brody Steele =

Canadian professional wrestler (born 1967)

- Steele pictured in the far-right as part of Wrestling Reality

Personal information
- Born: Peter Smith; August 5, 1967 (age 59) Halifax, Nova Scotia, Canada
- Website: The Official Website of Kingman

Professional wrestling career
- Ring name(s): Brody Steele; Patriot; Mighty Hercules; Kingman
- Billed height: 6 ft 6 in (198 cm)
- Billed weight: 299 lb (136 kg)
- Billed from: "Wherever he damn well pleases" Halifax, Nova Scotia, Canada
- Trained by: Leo Burke
- Debut: 1996

Peter Smith (born August 5, 1967) is a Canadian professional wrestler, better known as his ring name, Brody Steele. Steele starred as one of the four leading characters in the Wrestling Reality documentary-reality television series that aired on the Fight Network in Canada.

== Early life ==
Before becoming a professional wrestler, Smith competed in Maritime strongman competitions. He was known for his grip strength, at one point he held a weight of 250 pounds in each hand and walked 1,200 feet. Prior to becoming a professional wrestler, Smith played competitive softball and he won a provincial bodybuilding competition. He was asked to join St. Mary's University's football team but he declined the offer.

== Professional wrestling career ==
=== Early career (1996) ===
After being trained by Leo Burke, Smith started his wrestling career as The Patriot in 1996. The Patriot made his debut for Canadian Wrestling Federation, where he lost to Bobby Collins after being disqualified.

=== Independent circuit, Europe and Japan (1997–present) ===
After Smith's initial debut he went to further train with Burke for two months in Calgary at the Hart family's residence.

In 1999, Smith now as Kingman made his debut for Mike Hughes's Real Action Wrestling. In 1999, Kingman took part in a World Championship Wrestling tryout along with fellow maritime wrestlers, "Wildman" Gary Williams and Todd "The Bodd" Douglas.

Kingman, Bobby Roode and Mike Hughes formed "The Kardinal Sinners".

In 2002, Kingman and Bobby Roode were defeated by Billy Kidman and Tommy Dreamer in a dark match for World Wrestling Federation's Jakked.

Steele debuted for European promotion, All Star Wrestling in January 2003. Steele was defeated by Robbie Brookside in early 2003. In February 2003, Steele defeated Nigel McGuinness. In 2006, Steel and the debuting Sheamus O'Shaunessy defeated Robbie Brookside and Frankie Solan. Steele, Thunder, Bad Bones and Tracy Smothers were defeated by Brookeside, Dean Allmark, James Mason and Tony Spitfire. In February 2011, Steele and Gangrel defeated T-Bone and Adam Cole. Steele was defeated by Domino in his last match for ASW.

Later in 2003, Steele made his EWP debut in Germany where he and Gangrel defeated Cannonball Grizzly and Drew McDonald. Steele was defeated by Ulf Herman in his second match for EWP.

In 2005, Kingman won the 2nd Maritime cup, held by East Coast Pro Wrestling.

In 2016, Steele took part of The Great Khali's Continental Wrestling Entertainment. Steele defeated Khali, after the match, Steele, Mike Knox and Apollo Leon attacked Khali with steel chairs. This resulted in fans storming the ring.

In September 2017, Steele defeated Markus Burke to become WWP World Heavyweight Champion. Steele lost the title to Mr. Wrestling in South Africa.

On October 10, 2017, Steele, Shawn Hernandez and Hughes were defeated by Gajou, Kazushi Miyamoto and Tajiri. In February 2018, Hughes and Steele defeated Miyamoto and Kenso.

== Personal life ==
On June 11, 2018, it was announced that Peter Smith, along with Sandra Taylor, Mathieu Titus, Julien Young, and Chris Glidden, is now a co-owner of IHW Wrestling. IHW Wrestling, currently in its 13th year, and based in Moncton, NB Canada, is the longest continually running, active wrestling promotion in the Atlantic Provinces of Canada.

=== Great Khali incident ===
In February 2016, Steele and Indian wrestler, The Great Khali had lawsuits filed against them by lawyer, Arun Kumar Bhadoria due to a promo Steele made at a Continental Wrestling Entertainment insulting India.

== Championships and accomplishments ==
- All Star Wrestling
  - ASW British Heavyweight Championship (1 time)
- Atlantic Grand Prix Wrestling
  - AGPW Continental Championship (1 time)
- Continental Wrestling Entertainment
  - CWE Heavyweight Championship (1 time)
- East Coast Pro Wrestling
  - Maritime Cup Winner (1 time)
  - ECPW Heavyweight Championship (1 time)
- Power Of Wrestling
  - POW World Heavyweight Championship (1 time)
- Pro Wrestling Illustrated
  - Ranked No. 448 of the top 500 wrestlers in the PWI 500 in 2018
- Red Rock Wrestling
  - RRW Heavyweight Championship (1 time)
  - RWA Heavyweight Championship (1 time)
  - RWA International Championship (1 time)
- Ultimate Championship Wrestling
  - UCW Maritime Heavyweight Championship (2 times)
- World Association of Wrestling
  - WAW International Championship (1 time, final)
- World Wrestling Association (South Korea)
  - WWA World Tag Team Championship (1 time) – with Leatherface
- World Wrestling Professionals
  - WWP World Heavyweight Championship (1 time)
- Wrestling Reality
  - WWR Heavyweight Championship (1 time)
