= Canadian International Tag Team Championship =

Professional wrestling tag team championship

Details
- Promotion: Lutte Internationale
- Date established: September 1976
- Date retired: 1987
Statistics
- First champion(s): Dominic DeNucci and Nick DeCarlo
- Final champion(s): Richard Charland and Chuck Simms
- Most reigns: Gino Brito and Tony Parisi; Raymond Rougeau and Jacques Rougeau Jr. (4 reigns)

The Canadian International Tag Team Championship was the tag team title in the Montreal-based wrestling promotion Lutte Internationale (International Wrestling). The title lasted from 1976 until Lutte Internationale closed in 1987.

== Title history ==
Key
No.	Overall reign number
Reign	Reign number for the specific champion
Days	Number of days held

No.	Champion	Championship change			Reign statistics		Notes	Ref.
No.	Champion	Date	Event	Location	Reign	Days	Notes	Ref.
1	Dominic DeNucci and Nick DeCarlo	September 1976 (NLT)	IW show	N/A	1	N/A	The first champions	
2	Sailor White and Serge Dumont	September 21, 1976	IW show	Montreal, QC	1	N/A		
Championship history is unrecorded from September 21, 1976 to February 1978.
3	Edouard Carpentier and Mad Dog Vachon	February 1978 (NLT)	IW show	N/A	1	N/A	Defeat The Scorpions	
Championship history is unrecorded from February 1978 to June 2, 1980.
4	Pat Patterson and Raymond Rougeau	June 2, 1980	IW show	Montreal, QC	1	N/A	Defeat Gilles Poisson and Serge Dumont	
Championship history is unrecorded from June 2, 1980 to 1981.
5	Richard Charland and Len Shelley	N/A	IW show	N/A	1	N/A		
6	Swede Hansen and Le Bourreau/The Hangman	April 25, 1981	IW show	Sherbrooke, QC	1	N/A		
7	Gino Brito and Rick McGraw	December 1982 (NLT)	IW show	N/A	1	N/A		
8	Gilles Poisson and Sailor White	1982	IW show	N/A	1	N/A		
9	Gino Brito and Tony Parisi	1982	IW show	N/A	1	N/A		
10	Pierre Lefebvre and Michel Dubois	1982	IW show	N/A	1	N/A		
11	Pat Patterson and Raymond Rougeau	1982	IW show	N/A	2	N/A		
12	Pierre Lefebvre and Pat Patterson	October 1982 (NLT)	IW show	Sherbrooke, QC	1	N/A	Patterson and Rougeau break up; Patterson defeats Rougeau in a singles match and chooses Lefebvre as a new partner	
13	Raymond Rougeau and Jacques Rougeau, Jr.	1982	IW show	N/A	1	N/A		
14	Pierre Lefebvre and Pat Patterson	1982	IW show	N/A	2	N/A		
15	Gino Brito and Tony Parisi	January 1983	IW show	Montreal, QC	2	N/A		
16	Pierre Lefebvre and Billy Robinson	May 23, 1983	IW show	Montreal, QC	1	28		
17	Gino Brito and Tony Parisi	June 20, 1983	IW show	Montreal, QC	3	N/A		
Championship history is unrecorded from June 20, 1983 to August 1983.
18	Raymond Rougeau and Jacques Rougeau Jr.	August 1983 (NLT)	IW show	N/A	2	N/A		
19	Pierre Lefebvre and Pat Patterson	September 1983	IW show	N/A	3	N/A		
20	Gino Brito and Tony Parisi	December 12, 1983	IW show	Montreal, QC	4	N/A		
21	Pierre Lefebvre and Frenchy Martin	January 16, 1984 (NLT)	IW show	N/A	1	N/A		
22	Dino Bravo and Tony Parisi	February 20, 1984	IW show	N/A	1	N/A		
23	Pierre Lefebvre and Frenchy Martin	June 1984 (NLT)	IW show	N/A	2	N/A		
24	Raymond Rougeau and Jacques Rougeau Jr.	July 2, 1984	IW show	Montreal, QC	3	43		
25	Sailor White and Rick Valentine	August 14, 1984	IW show	Quebec City, QC	1	N/A		
—	Vacated	November 1984 (NLT)	—	—	—	—	Valentine leaves the promotion	
26	King Tonga and Richard Charland	May 27, 1985	IW show	Quebec City, QC	1	15	Defeat Jos Leduc and Leo Burke in tournament final	
27	Raymond Rougeau and Jacques Rougeau Jr.	June 11, 1985	IW show	Quebec City, QC	4	N/A		
—	Vacated	January 1986	—	—	—	—	The Rougeaus jump to the WWF	
28	The Long Riders (Scott and Bill Irwin)	March 6, 1986	IW show	Sudbury, ON	1	159	Defeat Dan Kroffat and Alofa. During this reign, Scott Irwin disappeared for several weeks around May or June with no explanation. In reality he was suffering in real life from a brain tumor and had to start chemotherapy. He would return in July, during a match that involved his brother Bill and Danny “Bull” Johnson facing Tom Zenk and Dan Kroffat. The titles would be held up pending rematch.	
29	Dan Kroffat and Tom Zenk	August 12, 1986	IW show	N/A	1	62	Defeat Bill Irwin and Danny Johnson in a rematch.	
30	Richard Charland and Sheik Ali	October 13, 1986	IW show	Montreal, QC	1	118		
31	Dan Kroffat and Armand Rougeau	February 8, 1987	IW show	Montreal, QC	1	64		
32	Richard Charland and Chuck Simms	April 13, 1987	IW show	Montreal, QC	1	N/A		
—	Deactivated	1987	—	—	—	—	Promotion closes	
