= Goldie Rogers =

Canadian professional wrestler (1950 – 2012)

Personal information
- Born: David Sherwin; August 5, 1950 Cobourg, Ontario
- Died: July 20, 2012 (aged 61) Cobourg, Ontario

Professional wrestling career
- Ring name(s): Goldie Rogers, Goldie Dove
- Billed height: 5 ft 10 in (1.78 m)
- Billed weight: 200 lb (91 kg; 14 st)
- Billed from: Hollywood, California
- Trained by: Phil Watson
- Debut: 1972
- Retired: 1992

David Sherwin (August 5, 1950 – July 20, 2012), better known by his ring name Goldie Rogers, was a Canadian professional wrestler born in Cobourg, Ontario.

== Professional wrestling career ==
Dave Sherwin trained with Phil Watson in April 1972 and debuted later that summer. He started his career wrestling under various masked gimmicks in multiple small promotions in Ontario, before heading to West Virginia and becoming the Hollywood villain persona 'Goldie Rogers'. Rogers worked in various territories including Jim Crockett Promotions in the Mid-Atlantic, Dean Silverstone's Superstar Championship Wrestling in Washington, Al Tomko's All-Star Wrestling in Vancouver, Frank Tunney's Maple Leaf Wrestling in Toronto and in Atlantic Grand Prix Wrestling in Canada's Maritimes. He also wrestled in various televised enhancement matches for the World Wrestling Federation in the early to mid 1980s.

In the mid to late 1980s, Rogers became a fixture of Stu Hart's Stampede Wrestling in Calgary, Alberta and was known for his stalling ring antics, bushy beard, colourful sunglasses, flashy ring attire and 'Listen up Jack!' catch phrase with his raspy voice. The promotion closed in December 1989, and Rogers returned to wrestling in the Maritimes, retiring in 1992. After retiring he started up "Call-A-Cab" taxi service in his hometown of Cobourg. On October 1, 2002 he married Faith Forget. He died in July 2012.
