= Speaking Out movement =

Social movement against abuse in professional wrestling

The Speaking Out movement is a social movement against emotional, physical and sexual abuse in the professional wrestling industry, where people publicize their allegations of misconduct committed by powerful and/or prominent individuals. Similar to other empowerment movements based upon breaking silence such as #MeToo, the purpose of #SpeakingOut (a hashtag that began to spread on Twitter in June 2020) is to empower wrestling-related people to tell their stories of abuse they have experienced.

== History ==
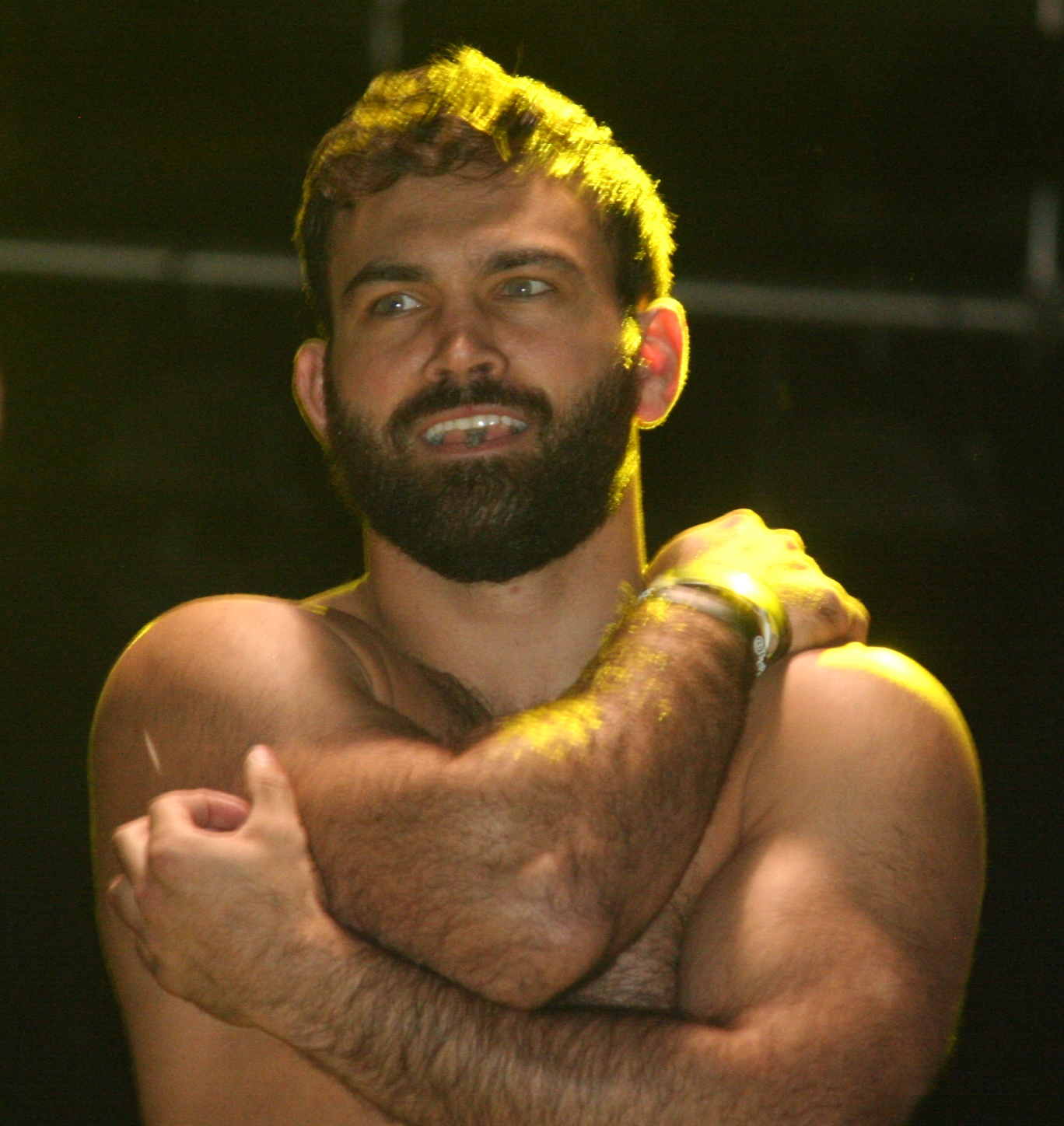
David Starr, the first wrestler accused in the movement

On June 17, 2020, independent wrestler David Starr was accused of sexual assault by a former girlfriend of his, which he denied. After the allegation came out, several wrestling promotions stripped Starr of their championships and fired him.

The following day, numerous people in and out of the pro wrestling industry accused several wrestlers, promoters, personalities, and journalists of sexual misconduct. The hashtag "Speaking Out" began to spread on social media when people told their stories. #SpeakingOut was a trending topic on Twitter. It was soon reported that the allegations were being investigated by West Yorkshire Police.

== Response ==
Many wrestlers, personalities, and journalists overwhelmingly supported those that spoke out on their experiences.

=== All Elite Wrestling ===
All Elite Wrestling (AEW) wrestler Jimmy Havoc was accused of emotional and verbal abuse by former partner, Rebecca Crow. On June 19, 2020, AEW announced in a statement that Havoc was attending therapy for a number of issues and they would come to a decision about his employment at a later date. Havoc was released by AEW on August 13.

On June 22, audio from a podcast went viral where Sammy Guevara joked that he wanted to rape then WWE women's wrestler Sasha Banks. AEW subsequently suspended Guevara without pay, with Guevara agreeing to undergo extensive sensitivity training. It was also announced that Guevara's salary would be donated to the Women's Center of Jacksonville. Later that day, Banks stated that she and Guevara had been in contact with each other, that he had apologized to her, and that they had engaged in an "open discussion" to help him understand the severity of his comments. Guevara completed his training and returned on July 22.

On June 23, Darby Allin was accused of emotional, mental, and sexual abuse by Hawlee Cromwell, an independent wrestler with whom he allegedly had a relationship.

=== Chikara ===
On June 19, Chikara removed Kobald from their roster following allegations made against him. Chikara owner Mike Quackenbush was also accused of knowingly overseeing a company that enabled abuse and neglect, which led to many wrestlers on the Chikara roster such as Hallowicked, Kimber Lee, Jacob Hammermeier, Frightmare and Green Ant resigning from the promotion. On June 24, Chikara announced they had shut down completely.

=== Impact Wrestling ===
Wrestlers Joey Ryan, Michael Elgin, and Dave Crist were accused of misconduct. Impact Wrestling's parent company, Anthem Sports & Entertainment, released a statement saying they were reviewing the allegations. Ryan, who had multiple allegations against him, released a statement without addressing specific allegations. It was later revealed that Ryan and Crist's contracts were terminated, while Elgin was suspended. On June 26, Impact Wrestling announced Elgin had been removed from all future programing. On July 2, Elgin released a video denying the allegations made against him. On July 18, Ryan also released a video denying almost all the allegations made against him. He filed lawsuits against some of his accusers as well as a lawsuit against Impact. On March 8, 2021, Ryan issued a statement saying he was dropping several lawsuits. Two days later, he issued a second statement saying he was dropping another lawsuit.

TJP came out with allegations of being taken advantage of by older female wrestlers when he was fifteen.

=== Major League Wrestling ===
On June 20, Major League Wrestling ring announcer Mark Adam Haggerty was accused of sending inappropriate text messages to a minor. An hour later, MLW and two other promotions announced that they would no longer be working with Haggerty.

=== National Wrestling Alliance ===
On June 18, National Wrestling Alliance Vice President Dave Lagana was accused of sexual misconduct. The following day, Lagana resigned from his position.

=== New Japan Pro-Wrestling ===
During the movement, New Japan Pro-Wrestling star Will Ospreay was accused by a former female wrestler, Pollyanna, of having her blacklisted after she made sexual assault allegations towards another wrestler, Scott Wainwright, who is a friend of Ospreay. While Ospreay denied the accusation, International Wrestling League released a statement that contradicted his denial. In October 2020, IWL clarified their statement, saying that Ospreay did not contact them directly.

=== Ring of Honor ===
On June 22, Marty Scurll was accused of taking advantage of a 16-year-old girl who was inebriated. Scurll released two statements in which he did not deny the allegations, but claimed the encounter was consensual while both participants were intoxicated. On June 25, Ring of Honor announced that they launched an investigation concerning the allegations. On January 4, 2021, it was announced that Scurll had left ROH.

On July 6, former ROH Women's Champion Kelly Klein alleged that Jay Lethal sexually harassed women and ROH covered it up. He had been previously accused by Taeler Hendrix of sexually harassing her in 2018. Lethal released a statement denying the allegations.

=== WWE ===
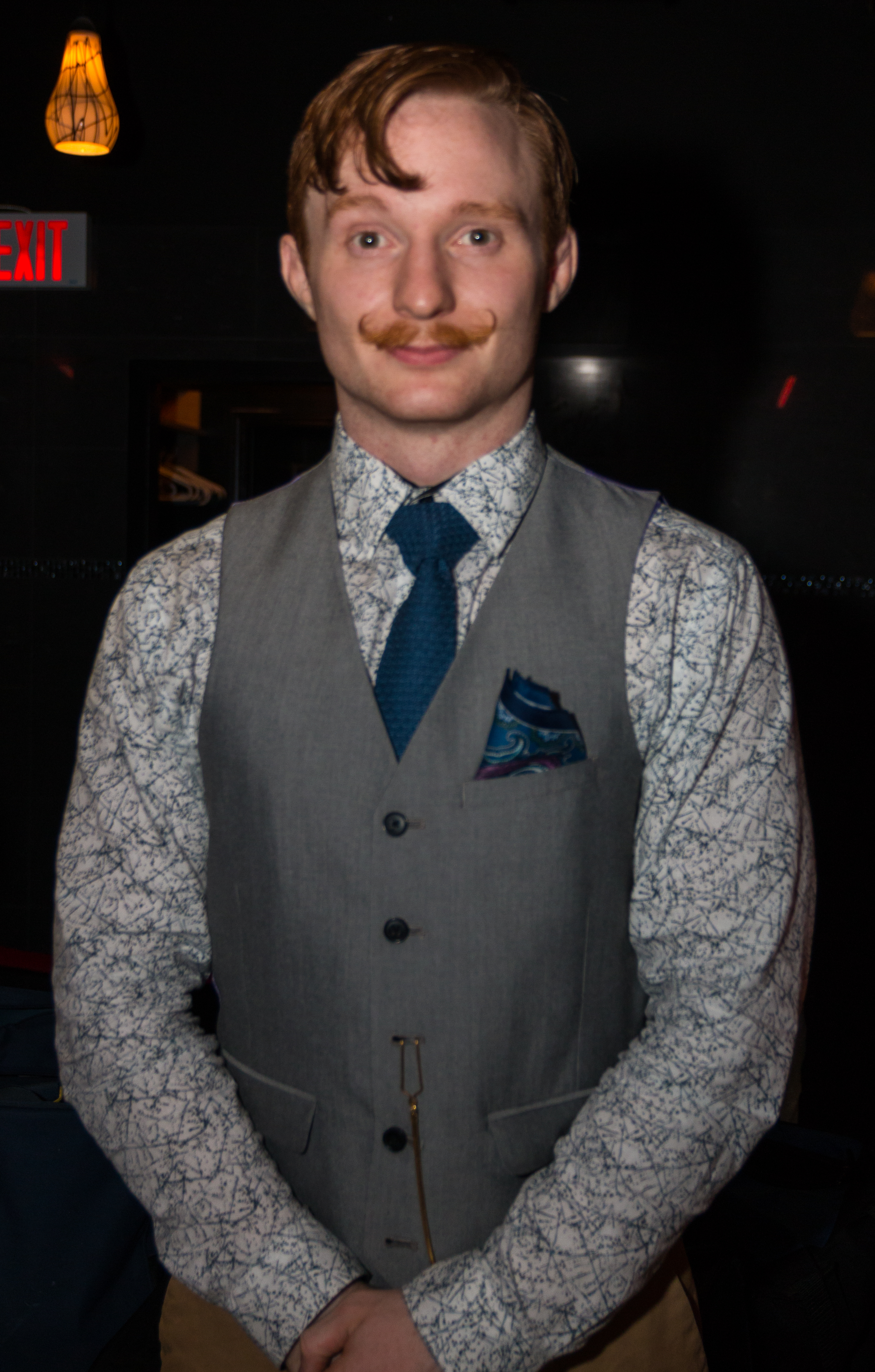
Jack Gallagher was released from WWE after allegations were made against him.

Jack Gallagher was accused of sexual assault. On June 19, he was released by WWE. His profile was later deleted from WWE.com. On October 4, Gallagher issued a statement concerning the circumstances that led to his release.

Joe Coffey was accused of harassing a woman, sending unsolicited naked photos, sending voice messages, and unsolicited stalking. On June 30, he was suspended by WWE. He returned to WWE in October 2020.

Jordan Devlin was accused of physical abuse by Hannah Francesca, a former partner, which he denied. He was suspended indefinitely by Progress Wrestling following the allegations. WWE stated that they were looking into the allegations and that they took any allegation of this nature very seriously. Devlin made his televised WWE return in March 2021.

Austin Theory was accused of misconduct. While WWE did not comment on the allegations, Theory was removed for two months before he returned to NXT in August 2020.

Matt Riddle was accused of sexual misconduct by Candy Cartwright, a female wrestler. Riddle denied the allegation through his attorney. It was later reported that WWE was aware of the allegation against Riddle when he was signed in 2018 and had investigated it at the time. On July 8, Riddle admitted to having an affair with Cartwright, but reiterated his denial of the accusations against him. On September 16, Riddle dropped his petition for a restraining order against Cartwright. The following day, Riddle filed a civil lawsuit against Cartwright. On October 8, it was reported that Cartwright filed a countersuit against Riddle, WWE, Gabe Sapolsky, and Evolve Wrestling. On March 24, 2021, a judge ruled to terminate WWE and Gabe Sapolsky as defendants in the lawsuit. Riddle's request for termination of the lawsuit was denied. On July 13, it was reported Cartwright dropped her lawsuit against Riddle.

Travis Banks was accused of emotional abuse by former student Millie McKenzie, who had a relationship with Banks while aged 17. McKenzie also stated that Banks had similar relationships with other trainees. Banks responded to the allegations via a statement. McKenzie proceeded to tweet screenshots of a text conversation between the two where Banks, who seemed to be intoxicated by the nature of his messages, had stalked McKenzie and was harassing her in a hotel room. Banks was released by Progress Wrestling and WWE following the allegations and his profile was also deleted from WWE.com.

Ligero was accused of indecent assault, sending inappropriate messages, and engaging in inappropriate conduct. While he denied the indecent assault allegation, he admitted that he did send inappropriate messages and engaged in inappropriate conduct. Ligero was released by Progress Wrestling and WWE following the allegations and his profile was also deleted from WWE.com.

Velveteen Dream was accused of having inappropriate communications with minors as well as attempting to groom them. He had previously been accused of sending inappropriate photos to minors several months earlier, which at that time he denied. Following Velveteen Dream's return on the August 12, 2020 episode of NXT, which was met with heavy criticism from fans, Triple H stated that WWE had investigated the allegations and they "didn't find anything". Following his release, Velveteen Dream issued a statement denying the allegations on May 24, 2021, and his profile was deleted from WWE.com.

NXT UK referees Joel Allen and Chris Roberts were released by WWE on June 30 following allegations against them.

=== Various independent promotions ===
In March 2020, three months prior to the Speaking Out movement taking place, 3-2-1 Battle! cut ties with head booker/trainer Steve West following allegations made against him. The entire management team was forced to step down as well. An attempt to revive the promotion with a new management team was quickly abandoned.

Black Label Pro released wrestler Johnathan Wolf on June 19, following allegations of sexual assault and mental abuse. Game Changer Wrestling subsequently removed Wolf from their The Wrld on GCW Part 2 show on June 20.

Mikey Whiplash was accused of sexual harassment and physical abuse. Fierce Wrestling cut ties with him following the allegations.

Inspire Pro Wrestling ended their relationship with wrestler Andy Dalton on June 20 following allegations that Dalton had sent inappropriate messages to a minor.

Following a string of sexual misconduct allegations made towards Singaporean wrestler Alex Cuevas, Singapore Pro Wrestling and Philippine Wrestling Revolution cut all ties with him.

On June 20, independent wrestler Kyle Boone tweeted about being assaulted and bullied by Kongo Kong at an independent wrestling event. Boone stated that he was forced to show his penis in front of the entire locker room and give him the money he made from the show and selling merch. Kong responded by saying when he started in the business, it was not uncommon to rib rookies. He continued his statement by saying if he had known sooner, he would have tried to hash it out like adults. He was not given any indication that something was wrong as it was all "hugs and smiles". He also stated he would only pick on people he liked and saw something in.

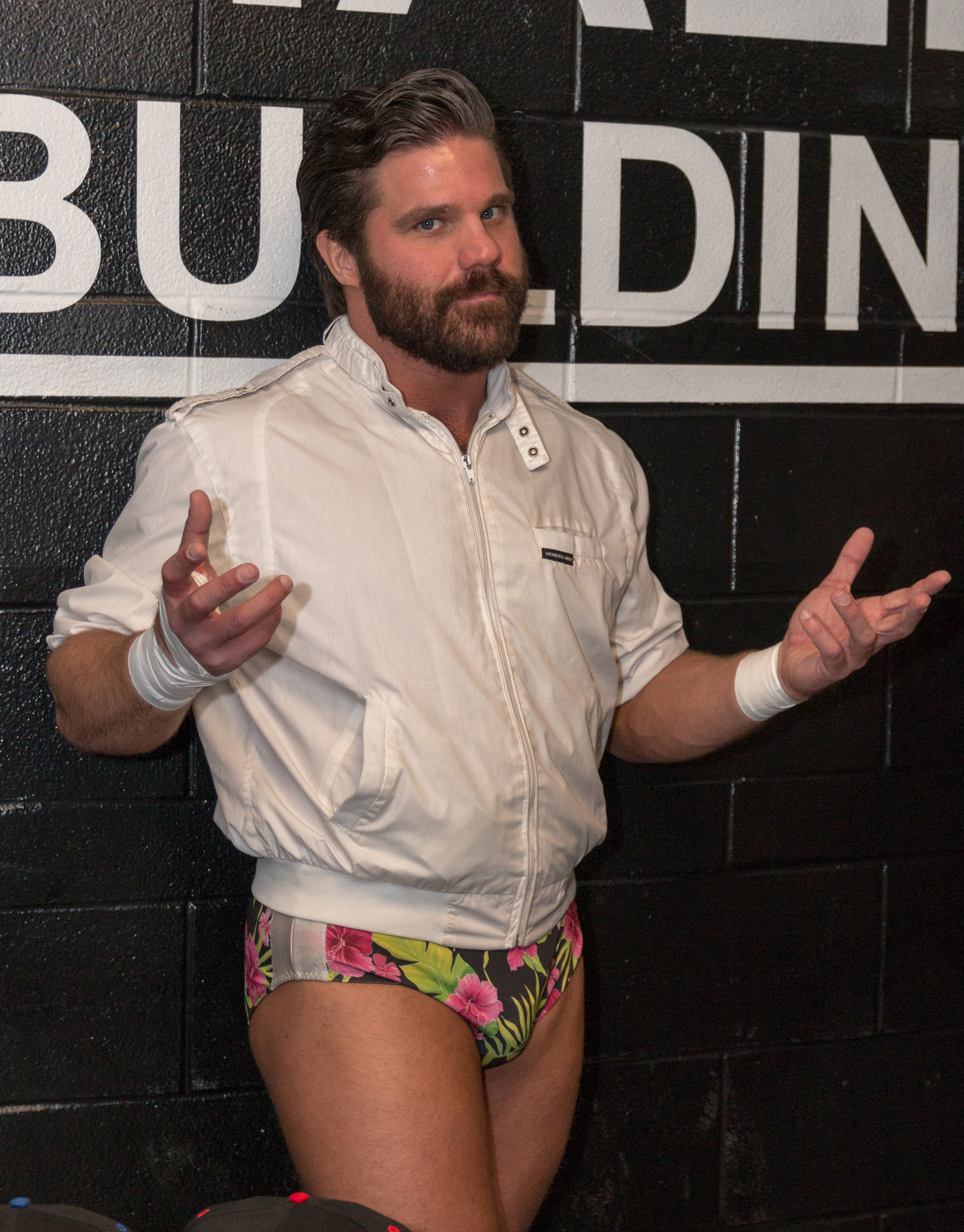
Joey Ryan was released from Impact Wrestling and his promotion, Bar Wrestling, was shut down.

On June 21, Bar Wrestling was shut down following multiple sexual misconduct allegations against owner Joey Ryan.

British independent wrestler Paul Robinson was accused of grooming and predatory behavior involving a 16-year-old in 2014. Robinson denied the allegations and later departed Progress Wrestling in 2021 before he briefly returned to the promotion in 2023.

Progress Wrestling announced that the promotion underwent structural changes after several wrestlers were either suspended or fired due to the numerous allegations made against them. The promotion also announced that they were shutting down until they were satisfied with the changes.

Former NWA/WCW and WWE manager Jim Cornette and his wife faced allegations from independent wrestler Phil Earley that he forced trainees to engage in sexual intercourse with her and would watch while he was in charge of Ohio Valley Wrestling. Cornette denied the allegations.

In Atlantic Canada, Maddison Miles spoke out against abusive wrestlers who were active in Maritime wrestling. Several wrestlers were removed by their respective promotions.

Saraya Knight retired on June 23 following allegations that she had abused both trainees and fellow colleagues.

Revolution Pro Wrestling fired trainer Andy Simmonz and one training student on June 24 following allegations against both.

Rockstar Pro Wrestling announced a new code of conduct in response to the Speaking Out movement.

Jeff Duncan (aka The Natural) was removed as one of the co-owners of Elite Canadian Championship Wrestling amid sexual harassment and bullying allegations. Duncan would later issue a statement regarding the allegations.

Over the Top Wrestling announced that the promotion underwent staff and policy changes in response to the Speaking Out movement.

Westside Xtreme Wrestling cut ties with wrestlers Julian Pace and Jay Skillet after allegations were made against them.

=== Wrestling journalism ===
Michael Brandon Stroud, professional wrestling editor for Uproxx, had his "With Spandex" vertical suspended after he was accused of sexual assault. Uproxx later announced on July 2 that Stroud was fired from the publication and "With Spandex" would be shut down, with future pro wrestling coverage to appear on Uproxx Sports.

== British Parliament inquiry ==
On September 24, 2020, the All-Party Parliamentary Group, an informal cross-party group of MPs which has no official status within Parliament, launched an inquiry into the UK wrestling scene after the numerous allegations that came out of the Speaking Out movement. Progress and Trust Wrestling announced they would be working with the APPG. The inquiry was headed by Alex Davies-Jones.

== See also ==
- Believe women
- MeToo movement
- Hashtag activism
- Cancel culture
- Vince McMahon sex trafficking scandal
- Ring boy scandal
