= Bobby Bass (wrestler) =

Canadian wrestler

Personal information
- Born: Dennis Baldock; February 23, 1947 (age 79) Dartmouth, Nova Scotia, Canada

Professional wrestling career
- Ring name(s): Bobby Bass; No Class Bobby Bass; Percy Pringle; Bob Pringle; Bobby Kincaid; Texas Outlaw
- Billed height: 6"0
- Billed weight: 251 lb (114 kg)
- Trained by: Phil Whipper Watson Jr.
- Debut: 1969
- Retired: 2001

Dennis Baldock (born February 23, 1947) is a Canadian retired professional wrestler and manager. He wrestled under the ring name, "No Class" Bobby Bass where he spent most of his career in the Maritimes for Atlantic Grand Prix Wrestling and Stampede Wrestling in Calgary.

== Professional wrestling career ==
Bass started his career in 1969 in Kentucky where he made $25 a night.

In 1970, he made his debut for Stampede Wrestling in Calgary, Alberta as Bob Pringle. He would become a three-time Stampede Wrestling International Tag Team Champion in 1974, 1976 and 1980.

Then in 1973, he made his debut in the Central States and American Wrestling Association in Minnesota as Percy Pringle. This was before Willam Moody who became Percy Pringle in 1978 and later became Paul Bearer who managed The Undertaker in the WWF. Bass used this name until 1977.

Bass worked for Maple Leaf Wrestling in Toronto from 1975 to 1978 and 1982 to 1984 when the promotion was bought by the WWF.

In 1976 and 1979 he worked in Japan for International Wrestling Enterprise.

In 1977, Bass made his debut in both NWA All-Star Wrestling in Vancouver and Portland Wrestling in the Pacific Northwest. His peak of his career was when he became five time NWA Canadian Tag Team Champion with The Iron Sheik and four different partners in a two and half year span.

Bass started working for Atlantic Grand Prix Wrestling based in Cap Pele, New Brunswick in 1980. This was the promotion which he became well known for. He won the AGPW North American Tag Team Championship with the Cuban Assassin defeating Hubert Gallant and Leo Burke.

In 1984, Bass worked for the World Wrestling Federation when the WWF had shows in Western Canada, Toronto and Buffalo, New York. He continued working for WWF in Toronto until 1986 when he went into semi-retirement.

In the 1990s he continued wrestling until his last match in 2001. Afterwards he became a manager for Real Action Wrestling in Halifax.

Today, Bass lives in Coburg, Ontario.

== Championships and accomplishments ==
- All-Star Wrestling
  - NWA Canadian Tag Team Championship (Vancouver version) (5 times) - with Moose Morowski (1), Joe Palardy (1), The Iron Sheik (1), Joe Ventura (1), and Yaki Joe (1)
- Atlantic Grand Prix Wrestling
  - AGPW North American Tag Team Championship (1 time) – with Cuban Assassin
- Cauliflower Alley Club
  - Men's Wrestling Award (2026)
- Gulf Coast Championship Wrestling / Southeastern Championship Wrestling
  - NWA United States Tag Team Championship (Gulf Coast version) (1 time) – with Don Bass
- Stampede Wrestling
  - Stampede Wrestling International Tag Team Championship (3 times) – with Ripper Collins (1), Bill Cody (1), and Duke Myers (1)
