= Wrestling Reality =

- Genre: Reality
- Created by: Greg Hemmings; Doug Robar
- Starring: Brody Steele; Trash Canyon "Wildman" Gary Williams "Kowboy" Mike Hughes
- Country of origin: Canada

Production
- Production location: Maritime provinces

Original release
- Network: The Fight Network; TWC Fight!
- Release: September 25, 2007

Wrestling Reality was a documentary television series created by independent filmmaker Greg Hemmings, airing on The Fight Network. It followed the lives of a group of independent professional wrestlers in the Maritime provinces of Canada. The series consisted of a half-hour documentary portion, as well as an hour of televised matches and shoot interviews. A sneak peek of the premiere episode aired September 25, 2007, with the full series then airing in early November. The series tackled many behind-the-scenes issues in professional wrestling including drugs, steroids, and sex. The colour commentary and play-by-play was provided by 89.3 K-Rock announcer/Eastlink host Darrin Harvey. The show also airs in the United Kingdom on TWC Fight!.

== Cast ==
=== Main participants ===
Cast Member	Age	Hometown	Biography
Brody Steele			At 6'8" and 325 lbs he is the biggest wrestler on the crew. Steele is known as the ring general of the group, with a quick temper but a big heart inside his tough exterior. He is also the most experienced, having traveled all over the world to wrestle. Brody is not afraid to be hard on the younger wrestlers on the crew.
Trash Canyon			The least experienced of the main 4 guys, but what he lacks in experience and in ring ability he well makes up for with his charisma, hard work, and determination. Some wrestlers with more experience are a little jealous of Trash, feeling that he has not paid his dues to be in the position he is within the company. While he might not have a lot of wrestling experience, Trash has an excellent mind for business and without him kicking down doors left and right it is unlikely the project would have ever gotten off the ground.
"Wildman" Gary Williams			While his in ring persona is "The Wildman" outside of the ring he is pretty much the mother hen of the crew, making sure everyone is taking care of and being the nice guy. It has been said on more than one occasion that Gary is probably the nicest guy in professional wrestling. On top of that after training with wrestling Legends Leo Burke and Bret Hart, Gary is known as one of the top wrestlers in Canada. He also runs his own wrestling school, Wildman Academy a couple of Gary's top students are also featured on the show. He also has his own band, Dead Reach formerly known as Tormented.
"Kowboy" Mike Hughes			"Kowboy" brings a lot to the group including in ring talent, charisma, and controversy. The show tackles a situation that came up between Mike and Brody Steele a few years back that caused their close friendship to come to an abrupt end. Mike has gained a reputation as guy that tells some tall tales, and it has somewhat alienated himself from some of his closest friends in the wrestling business over the last few years.

=== Other participants ===
Cast Member	Age	Hometown	Biography
Sidewinder	18		An up and comer who seems to have everything it takes, except the right attitude. He claims his role on the series to be "the young guy who does narcotics", but this does not sit well with the higher-ups in the promotion as they feel he is not taking his job seriously.
Lincoln Steen			A guy with a lot of passion and knowledge of the wrestling business who has just never been able to get the physique that would help take him to the next level.
Krysta Lynn Scott			Krysta is about as passionate about the wrestling business as one can get, and finds herself increasingly frustrated at the limitations of her partner due to an old knee injury. Krysta must also deal with her ex-boyfriend on the tour, a fellow Wildman Academy graduate, Tommy Ozbourne. At the time of the tour they had been broken up a few months and hadn't spoken at all, which made for some awkward situations.
Tommy Ozbourne			As if dealing with his ex-girlfriend wasn't hard enough, Ozbourne is struggling with his decision to put wrestling on the backburner in favor of a career in MMA. It becomes obvious that he is not comfortable being put in a high spot on the card when he plans to leave wrestling behind and there are so many guys out there that would kill to have his spot. However, because of his natural in-ring ability, no one is quite sure how he'll stand once the tour is over.
Purity Saint			

== See also ==
- Professional wrestling in Canada
- List of professional wrestling television series
