= Lincoln Steen =

Canadian professional wrestler

Personal information
- Born: Ryan Mader; March 18, 1982 (age 44) Halifax, Nova Scotia, Canada

Professional wrestling career
- Ring name: Lincoln Steen
- Billed height: 5 ft 11 in (1.80 m)
- Billed weight: 228 lb (103 kg)
- Debut: October 27, 2000

Ryan Mader (born March 18, 1982), better known by his ring name Lincoln Steen, is a Canadian professional wrestler, who has competed in Canadian independent promotions since October 27, 2000. He has featured as a prominent character in The Fight Network's Wrestling Reality and appeared in Rush HD's The Kardinal Sinners.

== Professional wrestling career ==
=== 2000–2004 ===
Steen grew up in Enfield, Nova Scotia as a wrestling fan. He eventually met Devin Chittick and Scott Savage through various local wrestling events and began his training with the pair in Sheet Harbour, Nova Scotia in June 2000. The following October, at the inaugural event for MainStream Wrestling (MSW), he squared off for the first time against Savage. In 2001, Vance Nevada arrived in Nova Scotia and assisted in securing new booking opportunities for Steen, who had recently become the first ever MainStream Wrestling Champion on July 21. Steen lost the title to Jeremiah Delinquent (Scott Savage) on November 30, 2001.

Steen travelled to Winnipeg, Manitoba with Top Rope Championship Wrestling and took part in Tony Condello's Northern Hell Tour during early 2002. Returning to MSW in the spring, Steen was the first two time MSW champion after winning the title back from "Red Hot" Ryan Wood. He then lost the title to Flex Falcone in a three-way match including Jeremiah Delinquent.

Steen showed up in Real Action Wrestling (RAW) in June 2002 where he was featured as part of the new cruiserweight division, winning the championship on EastLink Television, a decision that was immediately reversed by RAW officials. After the demise of RAW, Steen continued competing with MSW and appeared on various other dates throughout the region, most notably, losing in the first round of the first Maritime Cup to the eventual winner Bobby Rude. Steen was also featured on shows with Chi Chi Cruz, the Honky Tonk Man and Gangrel.

On August 24, 2002, Steen defeated Scott Savage and Sarah Stock in Halifax for the Canadian Unified Junior Heavyweight Championship. He lost it to Savage on May 15. He regained it on May 22 and lost it again on May 29 to Savage. Steen won his third MSW Championship from Tony Armstrong on November 27, 2003. On April 31, 2004, Steen vacated the title.

=== 2005–present ===
In late 2004, Brody Steele invited Steen to take part in Wrestling Reality. Steen returned for the second annual Maritime Cup featuring independent wrestlers in Canada including "Wildman" Gary Williams, Duke MacIsaac, Scott Savage and Tony Armstrong. He lost to Savage in the opening round. It was during this time that Steen found appeared with East Coast Pro Wrestling (ECPW) and Atlantic Grand Prix Wrestling. On May 2, 2008, Steen and Kowboy Mike Hughes defeated "Wildman" Gary Williams and Trash Canyon in a tag team match. Steen, Brody Steele and Hughes also defeated Williams, Canyon and James Mason in a 6-man tag-team match during which Hughes and Steele turned on Steen.

Steen then reemerged in MainStream Wrestling, when, disguised as Firefly, he went on to win a number one contender's battle for the MSW Championship. He has also appeared on selected shows for New Breed Wrestling in Debert, Nova Scotia, ECPW in Cape Breton, Red Rock Wrestling on Prince Edward Island, Innovative Hybrid Wrestling in New Brunswick and various events throughout Nova Scotia.

== Championships and accomplishments ==
- Canadian Pro-Wrestling Hall of Fame
  - Class of 2023
- MainStream Wrestling
  - MSW Heavyweight Championship (3 times)
  - MSW Atlantic Canadian Championship (1 time)
- Real Action Wrestling
  - RAW Cruiserweight Championship (1 time)
- Various Canadian Independent Promotions
  - Canadian Unified Junior Heavyweight Championship (2 times)
- Red Rock Wrestling
  - RRW North American Championship (2 time)
  - RRW Heavyweight Championship (3 times)
- CWF Canada
  - CWF Tag Team Championship (1 time)
- East Coast Professional Wrestling
  - ECPW Heavyweight Championship (2 times)
  - ECPW Celtic Roots Championship (1 time)
