= Jean-Neil Guay =

Canadian retired professional wrestler (born 1942)

Personal information
- Born: July 21, 1942 (age 84) Matane, Quebec, Canada
- Spouses: (Married) France Gagnon (m. 1967)
- Children: Steve Guay

Professional wrestling career
- Ring name(s): Neil Guay; The Hangman; Le Bourreau; Super Destroyer III; J.P. Durelle; The Towering Inferno; Big John the Quebec Lumberjack; Jean Louie; Jean Pierre LaSalle
- Billed height: 6 ft 3 in (1.91 m)
- Billed weight: 290 lb (130 kg; 21 st)
- Trained by: Pat Gerard
- Debut: 1964
- Retired: 1987

Jean-Neil Guay (born July 21, 1942) is a retired Canadian professional wrestler. He is best known by his ring name The Hangman (Le Bourreau) who spent his career in Calgary, Japan, New York, Montreal, Minnesota and Tennessee.

== Career ==
Guay worked as a policeman who was skilled in judo. He gave wrestling a shot and worked in Montreal and the Maritimes.

In 1975, he made his debut in Japan for New Japan Pro Wrestling. He also worked in Los Angeles where he became The Hangman and in Calgary for Stampede Wrestling.

In 1978, he made his debut in Memphis as Jean Louie winning the tag team titles with Jos Leduc. In 1979, he made his debut for the American Wrestling Association in Minnesota and became the Super Destroyer Mark III teaming with Super Destroyer Mark II and managed by Lord Alfred Hayes.

In 1980, he made his debut in the World Wrestling Federation being managed by Freddie Blassie. He defeated Rene Goulet at Showdown at Shea event. Hangman feuded with WWF Champion Bob Backlund, Andre the Giant, Pedro Morales and Bruno Sammartino. He left the WWF in 1981.

After WWF, he worked in Montreal for Lutte Internationale where he was a major star until the promotions shut its doors down in 1987. He retired from wrestling afterward.

== Personal life ==
In 1991, he was in a car accident that left him with a broken neck.

He appeared in the documentary Mad Dog and the Butcher released in 2019.

== Championships and accomplishments ==
- NWA Hollywood Wrestling
  - NWA Americas Heavyweight Championship (2 times)
  - NWA Americas Tag Team Championship (1 time) – with Roddy Piper (1)
- Continental Wrestling Association
  - AWA Southern Tag Team Championship (2 times) – with Jos Leduc (2)
- NWA All-Star Wrestling
  - NWA Pacific Coast Heavyweight Championship (1 time)
- International Wrestling Association
  - Canadian International Tag Team Championship (1 time) – with Swede Hanson
