= Ángel Acevedo =

Puerto Rican professional wrestler (born 1941)

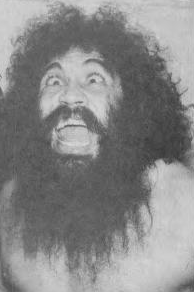
- Acevedo, c. 1982

Personal information
- Born: Ángel Acevedo; January 27, 1941 (age 85) San Juan, Puerto Rico
- Children: 4

Professional wrestling career
- Ring name(s): Angelo Castro; The Cuban Assassin; The Cuban Commando; El Mercenario
- Billed height: 5 ft 7 in (170 cm)
- Billed weight: 180 lb (82 kg) to 250 lb (110 kg)
- Billed from: Cuba
- Debut: 1973
- Retired: 2004, April 29, 2017 (guest appearance)

Ángel Acevedo (born January 27, 1941) is a Puerto Rican retired professional wrestler known by his ring name The Cuban Assassin and for his appearances with Atlantic Grand Prix Wrestling, World Wrestling Council and Stampede Wrestling. Ángel Acevedo is a permanent resident of Canada and resides in Calgary, Alberta. Acevedo's son, Richie Acevedo, was also a wrestler for many years but retired in 2009. Acevedo allowed Fidel Sierra to use the Cuban Assassin name as well, as long as he did not use it in Japan, which has led to some mistakenly crediting Acevedo and Sierra with championships they did not win.

== Early life ==
Ángel Acevedo was born on January 27, 1941, in Puerto Rico, son of a Puerto Rican mother and a Cuban father. The family moved to Cuba when Acevedo was seven months old. In school Acevedo competed in Amateur wrestling and later on took up boxing, even turning pro after graduating high school. He would later move to Florida and began training for a professional wrestling.

== Professional wrestling career ==
Acevedo made his debut for Eddie Graham's Championship Wrestling from Florida in 1973 where he created the ring persona "The Cuban Assassin", playing off his heritage as well as his resemblance to Fidel Castro due to his beard and hair. The following year Acevedo began working in Canada, initially in and around Montreal, working for Stu Hart's Stampede Wrestling. In Stampede he was given a partner, a masked man known as the "Cuban Assassin #2", with whom he won the Stampede Wrestling International Tag Team Championship in 1976. The duo won the championship from Ed and Jerry Morrow, Jerry Morrow would later go on to become a regular partner of Acevedo. The Cuban Assassins later lost the championship to Leo Burke and Stu Hart's son Keith Hart. In 1977 Acevedo was trusted enough by Stu Hart to be the opponent of his son Bret Hart in Bret's debut match. Later on he began splitting his time in Canada between Stampede Wrestling and Emile Dupree's Atlantic Grand Prix Wrestling (AGPW) that he often toured with over the summers. The Cuban Assassin and a masked wrestler known as "The Carpetbagger" (Angelo Poffo) were the first recorded AGPW North American Tag Team Champions at some point in 1978. Later that same year Cuban Assassin teamed up with Norman Frederick Charles III to win the Stampede Wrestling International Tag Team Championship, defeating Jerry Morrow and George Wells, the run was short lived as Keith Hart and Huber Gallant won the titles before 1978 was over. Over the years the Cuban Assassin became a bit of a tag team specialist, winning the North American Tag Team titles with Goldie Rogers in 1976, then again with Bobby Bass in 1980. Later on Dupree decided to bill Acevedo as "Angel Castro", teaming him up with a wrestler billed as Raoul Castro to win the North American Tag Team titles.

In late 1982 Acevedo returned to his native Puerto Rico, working for World Wrestling Council (WWC), teaming up with Jerry Morrow as Los Mercenarios ("The Mercenaries"). On October 3, 1983, the duo won the Puerto Rican version of the NWA North American Tag Team Championship in a tournament. Less than a month later the duo defeated Gino de la Serra and Pierre Martel to win the WWC World Tag Team Championship as well, making the double champions for two months before Gran Apolo and Pierre Martel won the world tag team championship. The following month Los Mercenarios lost the North American Tag Team Championship to Mr. Tempest and El Scorpio. After their tour of Puerto Rico they returned to Canada where the Cuban Assassin teamed up with Francisco Flores to defeat Mr. Hito and Jim Neidhart to win the Stampede International Tag Team Championship yet again. The following month the titles were shifted onto Bruce Hart and Davey Boy Smith. In 1985 Acevedo and Sweet Daddy Siki defeated "Bulldog" Bob Brown and the Great Pogo to win the AGPW North American Tag Team Championship, but lost them to Hans Herman and Killer Karl Krupp before Acevedo's summer tour with AGPW ended.

In 1986 The Cuban Assassin teamed up with Wayne Ferris to form a very successful and hated tag team. The two defeated Ben Bassarab and Chris Benoit to win the Stampede Tag team titles, which they later lost to Beniot and Keith Hart. In Stampede Avecedo and Gerry Morrow teamed up to become the Cuban Commandos, defeating Badd Company (Brian Pillman and Bruce Hart) for what was Acevedo's sixth run with the titles, followed by a seventh in 1988 that was ended by the British Bulldogs (Davey Boy Smith and the Dynamite Kid). Acevedo and Morrow returned to Puerto Rico in 1989 where they defeated Huracán Castillo Jr. and Miguel Pérez Jr. to with the WWC Caribbean Tag Team Championship.

In early 1990 Jerry Morrow left WWC, forcing the company to give half of the championship Ron Starr instead. The duo later gave up the championship, but would defeat Chris Youngblood and Mark Youngblood to win them one more time. Later on Super Médico I and Super Médico III won the titles from Los Mercenarios. The team defeated Invader I and Invader IV on May 24, 1990, to win the WWC Caribbean Tag Team Championship one last time, ending in July 1990 when Los Mercenarios lost to Huracán Castillo Jr. and Miguel Pérez Jr. Acevedo went into semi-retirement in 1992 but kept getting offers to wrestle in Canada until 2004 when he finally retired from wrestling.

In 2013 Acevedo appeared in the Victoria Pavilion, in Calgary, Alberta for the Hart Legacy Wrestling promotion.

On April 29, 2017, Acevedo appeared alongside Leo Burke as special guests at Ultimate Championship Wrestling's 10th Anniversary event at the Halifax Forum in Halifax, Nova Scotia, Canada. The pair would answer questions during a fan access event, reappearing later in the night during a six-man tag match where Acevedo would replace an injured Nick Strong.

== Personal life ==
Acevedo's first marriage produced a son and a daughter, one of which followed his father into professional wrestling as Richie Acevedo worked for many years as Cuban Assassin #2, then later Cuban Assassin Jr. for AGPW and later dropped the "Jr." to just be "Cuban Assassin". Acevedo later remarried after moving to Calgary, Alberta, Canada and has two children with his second wife.

== Championships and accomplishments ==
- Central States Wrestling
  - NWA Central States Tag Team Championship(1 time) - with Bulldog Bob Brown
- Atlantic Grand Prix Wrestling
  - AGPW North American Tag Team Championship (8 times) – with Carpetbagger (1), Goldie Rogers (1), Bobby Bass (1), Raul Castro (1), Sweet Daddy Siki (1), Leo Burke (2), Gerry Morrow (1)
- Canadian Wrestling Hall of Fame
  - Class 2012
- Prairie Wrestling Alliance
  - PWA Hall of Fame - 2008
- Stampede Wrestling
  - Stampede Wrestling International Tag Team Championship (6 times) - with Cuban Assassin #2 (1), Norman Frederick Charles III (1), Francisco Flores (1), Wayne Ferris (1), Gerry Morrow (2)
- World Wrestling Council
  - NWA North American Tag Team Championship (1 time) – with Gerry Morrow
  - WWC Caribbean Tag Team Championship (3 times) – with Gerry Morrow (2), Ron Starr (1)
  - WWC World Tag Team Championship (2 times) – with Gerry Morrow (1) and Ron Starr (1)
- Other titles -
  - W. Virginia Heavyweight Championship ( 2 times )
