= Eddie Watts (wrestler) =

Canadian professional wrestler

Personal information
- Born: Gregory Nykoliation; March 19, 1968 (age 58) Virden, Manitoba, Canada

Professional wrestling career
- Ring name(s): Eddie Watts; Animal #2; Eddie Scales; Evil Eddie Watts; Greg Powers; Lunatic; Metalface; Starman; Steelface; Steel Leather; Tasmanian
- Billed height: 5 ft 8 in (1.73 m)
- Billed weight: 238 lb (108 kg)
- Trained by: Ernest Rheault
- Debut: 1986
- Retired: 2008

Gregory Nykoliation (born March 13, 1968) better known by his ring name Eddie Watts is a retired Canadian professional wrestler who worked in Western Canada, the Maritimes, Mexico, Puerto Rico and Japan.

== Professional wrestling career ==
Watts started his professional wrestling career in 1986 at 18. Working in Vancouver, Manitoba and the Maritimes. He formed a tag team with Pierre Carl Ouellet known as the "Super Bees".

In 1989, Watts worked in the finals days of Stampede Wrestling in Calgary before the promotion went under.

In 1990, Watts went to Mexico and Puerto Rico where he had success there becoming the WWC Junior Heavyweight Champion holding the title for three months. He would team up with Chuck Coates as the Animals losing in a mask vs mask tag team match to Lizmark and Atlantis.

Throughout the 1990s, Watts continued working in Mexico, Japan and River City Wrestling in Manitoba.

Watts wrestled a match in WWE losing to Luther Reigns on the September 18, 2004 edition of Velocity.

During the rest of his career, Watts worked in the independents in Manitoba until he retired in 2008.

== Personal life ==
He has trained many wrestlers including Sarah Stock, Lincoln Steen and many others.

== Championships and accomplishments ==
- World Wrestling Council
  - WWC Junior Heavyweight Championship (2 times)
  - WWC Tag Team Championship (1 time) - with Rico Suave (wrestler) (1)

== Luchas de Apuestas record ==
Winner (wager)	Loser (wager)	Location	Event	Date	Notes
Lizmark and Atlantis (mask)	The Animals (I and II) (masks)	Mexico City	Live event	November 25, 1990	
