= Emile Duprée =

Canadian professional wrestler and promoter (1936–2023)

Personal information
- Born: Emile Goguen; October 20, 1936 Shediac, New Brunswick, Canada
- Died: September 17, 2023 (aged 86) Pointe-du-Chêne, New Brunswick, Canada
- Children: 3, including René Duprée

Professional wrestling career
- Ring name(s): Emile Duprée; Emile Dupré; Emile Goguen "Golden Boy"
- Billed height: 6 ft 0 in (1.83 m)
- Billed weight: 225 lb (102 kg)
- Trained by: Vic Butler; Reggie Richard
- Debut: October 10, 1955
- Retired: 1988

Emile Goguen (October 20, 1936 – September 17, 2023), known by the ring name Emile Duprée, was a Canadian professional wrestler and promoter. He was the owner and head booker of Grand Prix Wrestling (GPW), which was a significant presence in the Maritimes territories. He was also the father of wrestler René Duprée.

== Early life ==
Goguen was born on October 20, 1936, in Shediac, New Brunswick, as the son of Edmond Goguen and Rosanna Goguen (née Cormier). He grew up with one brother and three sisters.

== Professional wrestling career ==
Goguen began training in 1955 with Maritime professional wrestling legends Vic Butler and Reggie Richard. He had always been into weightlifting, but professional wrestling was something Goguen had never gotten into until Butler and Richard told Emile that they saw potential in Emile for a professional wrestling career.

Adopting the ring name Emile "Golden Boy" Duprée (also spelled Dupré), Duprée started in Boston, Massachusetts, and began to travel all over the continent and even went on tours to Australia and New Zealand. He also wrestled for Stampede Wrestling.

Throughout his career he wrestled many wrestling legends including Killer Kowalski, Dusty Rhodes, and Maritime legend the Cuban Assassin.

=== Grand Prix Wrestling (1977-2017) ===
In 1977, Duprée began his own small wrestling promotion. This promotion was run all across the Maritimes and as years went on and the promotion grew, he would take the tour to Quebec, Ontario, and other places around the Maritimes.

At one time, Grand Prix Wrestling was televised and had major success until World Wrestling Entertainment bought it from Emile. Notable wrestlers who wrestled there include Edge, Christian, Killer Kowalski, André the Giant, Randy Savage, Lanny Poffo, Harley Race, and Ric Flair.

During the summer of 2008, Emile ran Grand Prix Wrestling. Emile claimed that the promotion ended due to heavy travelling costs. The promotion was partnered up with the WWE to bring Maritime wrestling talent into the WWE spotlight. As of May 2013, Emile and his son René decided to bring Grand Prix Wrestling back to life. Their most recent show was in April 2017.

== Personal life ==
He was also the father of wrestler René Duprée, who wrestled for WWE from 2003 to 2007 and Japan.

== Death ==
Duprée died on September 17, 2023, at the age of 86.

== Championships and accomplishments ==
- Canadian Pro-Wrestling Hall of Fame
  - Class of 2023
