= WrestleMania I =

1985 World Wrestling Federation closed-circuit television event

- Promotional poster featuring Hulk Hogan and Mr. T
- Promotion: World Wrestling Federation
- Date: March 31, 1985
- City: Manhattan, New York
- Venue: Madison Square Garden
- Attendance: 19,121
- Tagline: The Greatest Wrestling Event of All Time!

Pay-per-view chronology
← Previous; First	Next → The Wrestling Classic

WrestleMania chronology
← Previous; First	Next → 2

Event chronology
← Previous; The War to Settle the Score	Next → The Wrestling Classic

WrestleMania, sequentially known as WrestleMania I, was a 1985 professional wrestling closed-circuit television (CCTV) event produced by the World Wrestling Federation (WWF, renamed WWE in 2002). It was the inaugural WrestleMania and took place on March 31, 1985, from Madison Square Garden in the New York City borough of Manhattan, New York. The attendance for the event was 19,121. The event was seen by over one million viewers, making it the largest showing of a wrestling event on CCTV in the United States at the time.

The event consisted of nine professional wrestling matches. In the main event, Hulk Hogan and Mr. T defeated Paul Orndorff and Roddy Piper. Also, Wendi Richter, accompanied by manager Cyndi Lauper, defeated Leilani Kai to win the WWF Women's Championship, while Nikolai Volkoff and The Iron Sheik defeated The U.S. Express (Mike Rotundo and Barry Windham) to win the WWF Tag Team Championship. Celebrity guests included former heavyweight boxing champion Muhammad Ali as a referee, baseball player/manager Billy Martin as a ring announcer, and musician-actor Liberace as a timekeeper.

Retrospective reviews of WrestleMania I have been mixed, with critics generally ranking it as one of the most average WrestleManias in history. While the main event earned generally positive reviews, many of the undercard matches were negatively received. Despite this, its success led to a follow-up the next year, subsequently becoming the largest annual professional wrestling event in history, later described as the "Super Bowl of sports entertainment".

== Production ==
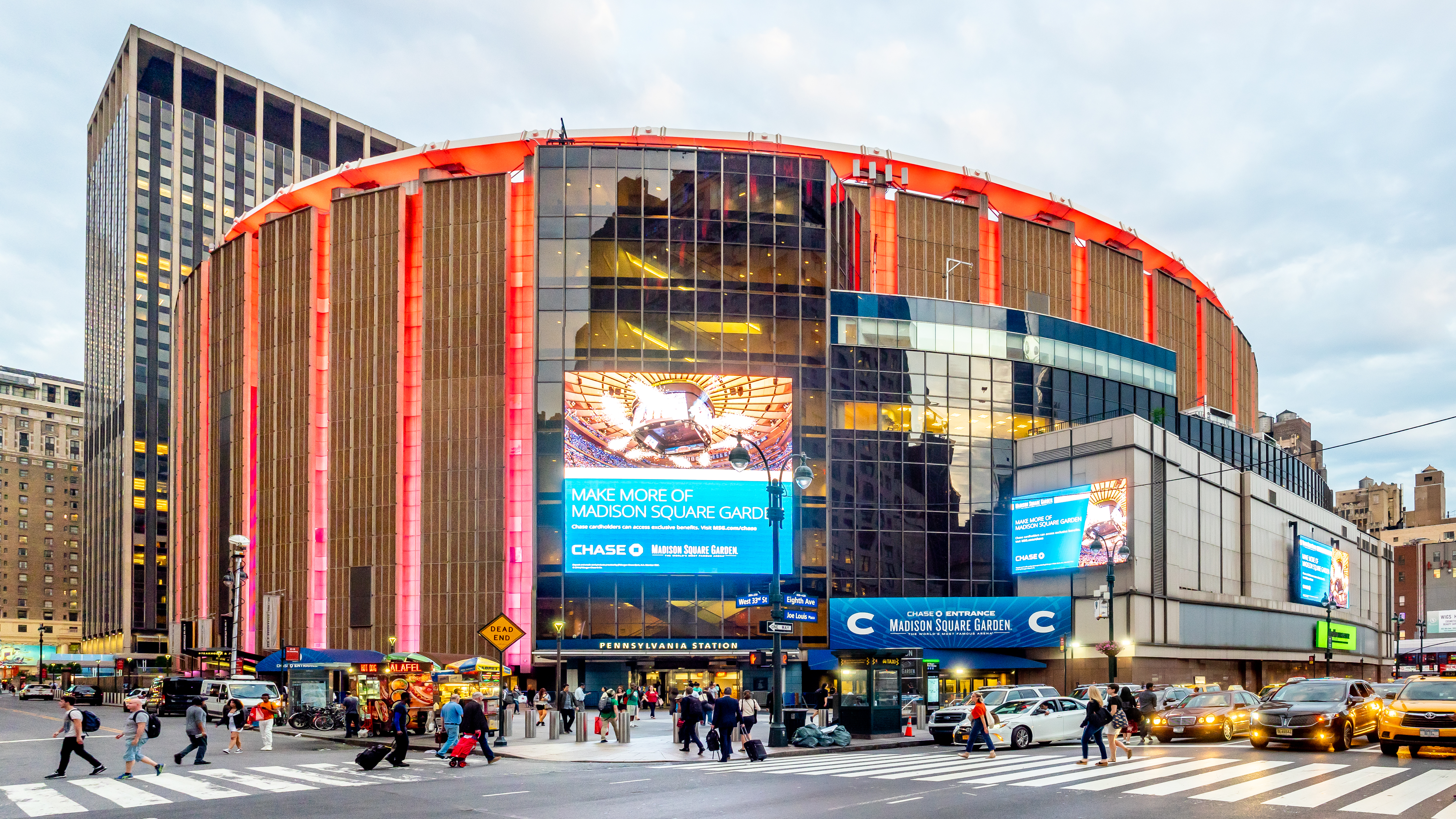
The inaugural WrestleMania was held at Madison Square Garden in the New York City borough of Manhattan, New York.

=== Background ===
During the 1980s, the World Wrestling Federation's (WWF, renamed WWE in 2002) main competition in the professional wrestling industry was from Jim Crockett Promotions of the National Wrestling Alliance (NWA). Vince McMahon countered Jim Crockett's successful Starrcade annual events, which began airing in 1983, by creating the WrestleMania in 1985. A rights agreement which Barry Diller, head of USA Network and co-owner of Paramount, pushed by 1983, also allowed for better access to programming at Madison Square Garden in the New York City borough of Manhattan, New York, including on any regional pay television network.

For the first WrestleMania, McMahon began cross-promoting with MTV, which aired two wrestling events. The inaugural broadcast was entitled The Brawl to End It All and aired on July 23, 1984, in which a match from a live Madison Square Garden broadcast was shown on MTV. Wendi Richter, allied with Cyndi Lauper, defeated The Fabulous Moolah, backed by Lou Albano, to win the WWF Women's Championship on the card and the event saw Hulk Hogan retaining the WWF World Heavyweight Championship against Greg Valentine in the main event of closed circuit television (CCTV)-only. At the second MTV broadcast, entitled The War to Settle the Score on February 18, 1985, Leilani Kai, accompanied by Moolah, defeated Richter, once again accompanied by Lauper, to win the Women's Championship. Aside from Lauper, other celebrities also appeared during the buildup to and at the event; most notably, Muhammad Ali, Liberace (with The Rockettes), Major League Baseball manager Billy Martin, and actor Mr T all appeared during the main event between Hulk Hogan and Roddy Piper for the WWF World Heavyweight Championship.

WWF announcer Gene Okerlund sang "The Star-Spangled Banner", while Gorilla Monsoon and Jesse Ventura provided commentary. Okerlund also conducted interviews backstage, while Alfred Hayes conducted interviews near the entrance to the locker room, right outside the ring. Howard Finkel served as the event's ring announcer. The opening theme for the event was the instrumental portion of the Phil Collins and Philip Bailey hit song, "Easy Lover", while the closing theme for the credits was "Axel F" by Harold Faltermeyer.

=== Storylines ===
Mr. T and Hulk Hogan at the first WrestleMania

The card consisted of nine professional wrestling matches that resulted from scripted storylines. Three championships were defended at WrestleMania: the WWF Women's Championship, the WWF Intercontinental Heavyweight Championship, and the WWF World Tag Team Championship.

Leading up to the event, Greg "The Hammer" Valentine had feuded with Tito Santana over the Intercontinental Heavyweight Championship. Valentine defeated Santana on September 24, 1984, for the title. Mike Rotunda and Barry Windham won the WWF Tag Team Championship three months before WrestleMania from the team of Adrian Adonis and Dick Murdoch.

In the months leading up to WrestleMania, "Rowdy" Roddy Piper began a talk-show segment on WWF television entitled "Piper's Pit". On one episode of the show, Piper hit Jimmy Snuka over the head with a coconut after verbally berating him, leading to a heated feud between the two men. As part of the storyline, Piper recruited "Cowboy" Bob Orton to be his bodyguard. Some time later, during another episode of "Piper's Pit", Piper spoke out against the burgeoning Rock 'n' Wrestling connection, which led to a confrontation with Hulk Hogan. In February 1985, the two men faced each other in a WWF World Heavyweight Championship match at The War to Settle the Score, where the reigning champion, Hogan, won by disqualification after interference by Paul Orndorff and Mr. T. Their ongoing feud led to their tag team match at WrestleMania.

As part of the promotion for the event, Hogan appeared on a talk show entitled Hot Properties four days prior to WrestleMania, where he put host Richard Belzer into a front chinlock. It was a move that cuts off the flow of blood to the brain, as a way to prove to Belzer and the audience just how "real" professional wrestling is. Belzer, however, fell to the floor unconscious and began to bleed profusely. His injury required eight stitches. Belzer later sued Hogan for US$5 million, but they eventually settled out of court. The night before WrestleMania, Hogan and Mr. T hosted an episode of Saturday Night Live to help promote the event.

== Event ==
=== Preliminary matches ===
Tito Santana vs. The Executioner

Gene Okerlund opened the event by singing the national anthem. The originally intended singer, a celebrity guest that Okerlund and Vince McMahon refused to name, failed to appear.

Other on-screen personnel
Role:	Name:
Commentators	Gorilla Monsoon
Commentators	Jesse Ventura
Interviewers	Gene Okerlund
Interviewers	Lord Alfred Hayes
Ring announcers	Howard Finkel
Ring announcers	Billy Martin (Main Event)
Referees	Jack Lotz
Referees	Dick Kroll
Referees	Joey Marella
Referees	Pat Patterson
Referees	Henry Terranova
Special Guest Timekeeper	Liberace (Main Event)
Special Guest Outside Referee	Muhammad Ali (Main Event)
Special Guests	The Rockettes (Main Event)

The opening match was between Tito Santana and The Executioner (Buddy Rose). Santana won the match by submission after applying a figure four leglock on The Executioner, which was a shot at current Intercontinental Champion Greg Valentine, as the figure four was his finishing move.

Following the opening match, King Kong Bundy (accompanied by Jimmy Hart) and Special Delivery Jones made their way to the ring. After crushing Jones against the turnbuckle and executing a big splash, Bundy won the match. The WWF's official time for the match is a then-record time of 9 seconds (a record since surpassed by The Rock defeating Erick Rowan at WrestleMania 32), although the match actually lasted 24 seconds.

The next match was between Ricky Steamboat and Matt Borne. Steamboat took the early advantage in the match-up, until Borne flipped him over and slammed him to the mat using a belly-to-belly suplex. After performing a flying crossbody, Steamboat pinned Borne for the win.

After the match ended, David Sammartino, accompanied by his father Bruno Sammartino, and Brutus Beefcake, accompanied by Johnny Valiant, made their way to the ring. The action favoured both contestants, as each wrestler alternated having the advantage. After Beefcake threw David Sammartino out of the ring, Valiant lifted him and slammed him to the cement floor. He then pushed Sammartino back into the ring before being attacked by Bruno. A short while later, all four men began fighting in the ring, and the match ended in a no-contest.

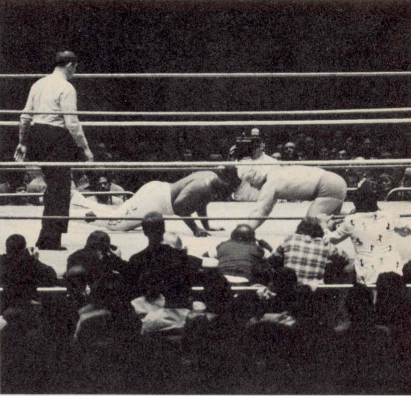
Junkyard Dog (left) vs Greg Valentine (right)

The first championship match of WrestleMania was between Junkyard Dog and the reigning WWF Intercontinental Heavyweight Champion Greg Valentine, who was accompanied to the ring by his manager Jimmy Hart. Junkyard Dog began the match in the offensive position, performing headbutts and punches on Valentine. As the action went back and forth, Hart climbed on the ring apron, where Valentine accidentally hit him. Later, Valentine pinned Junkyard Dog with his feet on the ropes for leverage, which is an illegal maneuver. As a result, Tito Santana ran down to the ring and explained to the referee what had happened and the match was restarted. Junkyard Dog eventually won the match by count-out as Valentine failed to re-enter the ring. Valentine, however, kept his title as titles do not change hands through count-out.

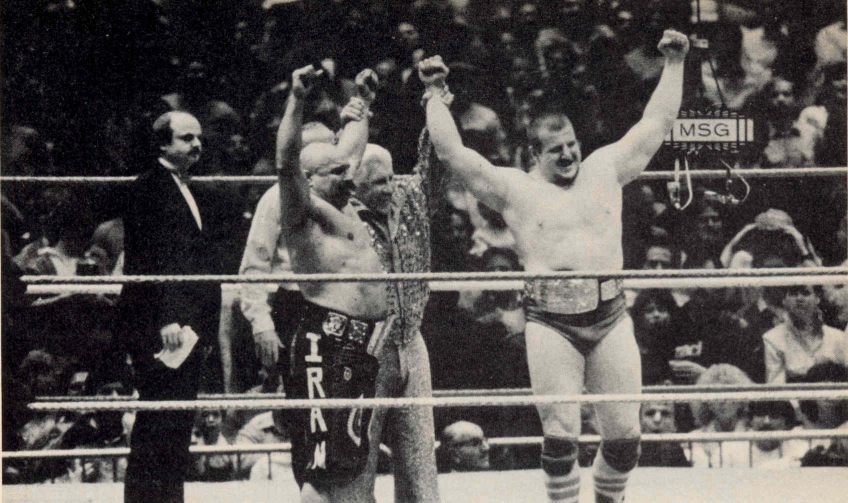
Volkoff (right) and Sheik (left) celebrate winning the WWF Tag Team Championships with manager Blassie (center).

The following match was for the WWF Tag Team Championship. Nikolai Volkoff and The Iron Sheik, accompanied to the ring by Freddie Blassie, challenged the reigning champions, The U.S. Express (Mike Rotundo and Barry Windham), who were accompanied by Lou Albano. The U.S. Express dominated the early part of the match until Volkoff and The Sheik began to gain the offensive advantage over Rotundo. Rotundo then tagged in Windham, who performed a bulldog on The Sheik. After nearly being pinned, The Sheik hit Windham in the head with Blassie's cane as the referee had his back turned. After Volkoff got the pin, Volkoff and The Sheik were crowned as the new tag champions, becoming the first wrestlers to win a championship at WrestleMania.

=== Main events ===
André the Giant vs. Big John Studd

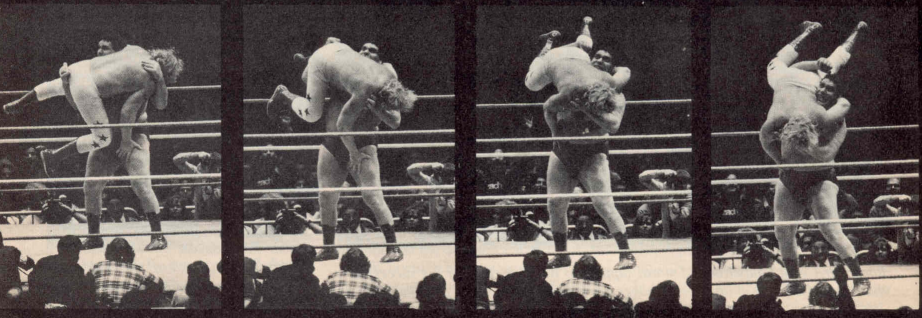
André the Giant (bottom) bodyslams John Studd (top).

The next match on the card was a $15,000 Body Slam Challenge between André the Giant and Big John Studd, who was accompanied by Bobby Heenan. The stipulation of the match was that André the Giant had to body slam Studd to win $15,000, and if he failed, he would be forced to retire. After beginning the match in the defensive position, André countered with chops and a headbutt. From then on, André controlled the match and after weakening Studd's knees with multiple kicks, André was able to lift Studd over his shoulders and execute a body slam to win the match. After André collected his prize money, he started throwing the money out to the audience. Heenan, however, grabbed the bag holding the remainder of the winnings and ran from the ringside. As a result of the match, André was able to continue his career and his WWF undefeated streak was unscathed.

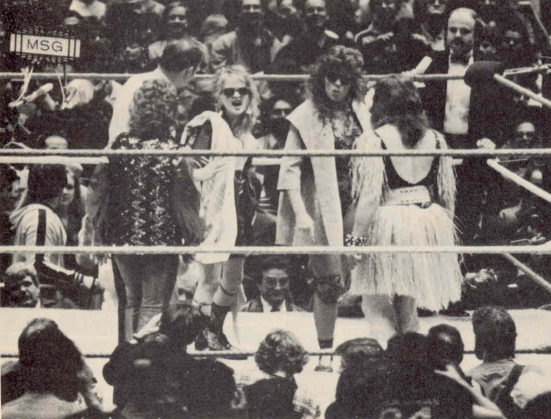
Richter and Lauper (back) face off against Kai and Moolah (front, facing away) before the match.

After all the men had left ringside, it was time for the WWF Women's Championship match between Wendi Richter, managed by singer Cyndi Lauper, and Leilani Kai, managed by former champion The Fabulous Moolah. Shortly after the match began, Moolah grabbed Richter as she was outside on the floor, but Lauper saved her from an attack. Kai then performed a flying crossbody from the top rope, but Richter used Kai's momentum to roll-up Kai in a pinning position. With this pin, Richter became the new Women's Champion.

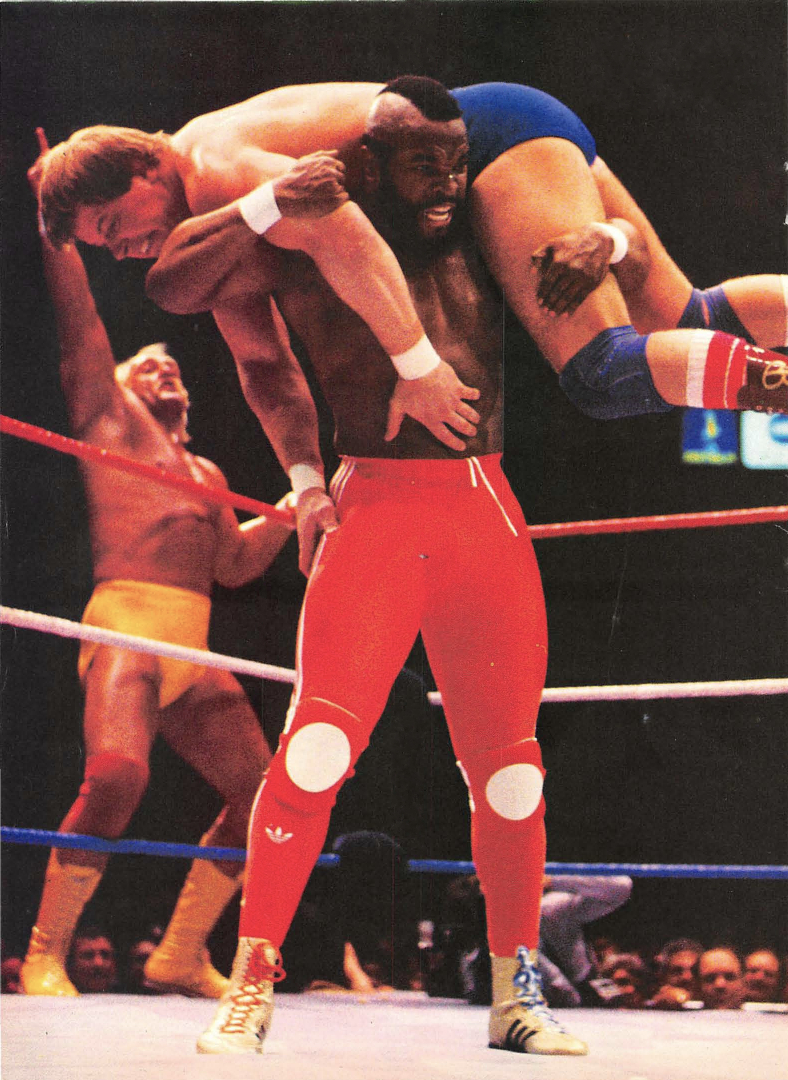
Mr T. hoists Roddy Piper up onto his shoulders as Hulk Hogan cheers in the background during the main event.

The main event and last match of the night pitted Hulk Hogan, the reigning WWF World Heavyweight Champion, and Mr. T, accompanied by Jimmy Snuka, against "Rowdy" Roddy Piper and "Mr. Wonderful" Paul Orndorff, accompanied by "Cowboy" Bob Orton. Professional boxer Muhammad Ali was the special guest referee (on the outside of the ring), New York Yankees manager Billy Martin was the guest ring announcer while Liberace (accompanied by The Rockettes) was the guest time keeper. First, Piper, Orndorff, and Orton made their way to the ring as drums and bagpipes played, causing the crowd to boo. Crowd favorites Hogan, Mr. T, and Snuka made their way to the ring next. The match began with Mr. T and Piper in the ring and the two traded blows. Midway through the match, all four men began brawling in the ring, and Muhammad Ali punched Piper in an attempt to restore order. After the match's order was restored, Orndorff and Piper had the offensive advantage. As Orndorff locked Hogan into a full nelson, Orton climbed the top rope to attempt to knock out Hogan. Instead, Orton mistakenly hit Orndorff, and Hogan pinned him to win the match. In frustration, Piper knocked out the in-ring official, Pat Patterson, before he and Orton retreated backstage leaving Orndorff alone in the ring with Hogan, Mr. T, and Snuka.

== Reception ==
The attendance at the event was 19,121. In addition, the event was seen by over one million viewers through closed-circuit television, making it the largest wrestling event on closed-circuit television in the United States at the time. A technical glitch ended the closed circuit broadcast early into the showing at the Civic Arena in Pittsburgh, Pennsylvania. To appease angry fans who pelted the screen with garbage, WrestleMania was broadcast in its entirety on local ABC affiliate WTAE-TV on Saturday April 6, 1985.

John Powell of Slam! Wrestling rated the event as average, citing that it "wasn't the greatest". Despite his overall rating, he praised several moments, including Orton hitting Orndorff with his cast, King Kong Bundy's win, and André the Giant throwing the money into the crowd. Powell listed Mr. T wrestling as his least favorite moment of the pay-per-view, saying the main event match, in which Mr. T took part, was humorous despite its lack of technical wrestling. Pro Wrestling Illustrated awarded the main event match its annual PWI Match of the Year honor. The event was included in a July 2007 special that aired on the MSG Network titled "The 50 Greatest Moments at Madison Square Garden", ranking at No. 30.

In the December 2002 issue of Wrestling Digest, the main event match-up was listed as number five in the most memorable twenty-five matches of the past twenty-five years. Echoing John Powell's thoughts, Kevin Eck of Wrestling Digest stated, "The match itself was far from a technical-wrestling classic, but it delivered in terms of entertaining the crowd." In another Wrestling Digest article, written by Keith Loria, the main event was ranked third in the top ten matches in WrestleMania history. In contrast to Powell, Loria believed that Mr. T "proved to be an adequate grappler".

Several of the undercard matches received a more negative reception. Reviewing for tjrwrestling, John Canton rated the Body Slam Challenge between Big John Studd and Andre The Giant as a "Dud", stating it needed "to be two minutes tops" and noting how limited both men were. Reviewing for 411mania, Kevin Pantoja was mildly more positive, highlighting the "novelty of someone possibly body slamming Andre The Giant" and its nature as "pure spectacle", but stated it had plenty of "plodding moments".

== Aftermath ==
Approximately three months after WrestleMania, on July 6, 1985, Greg Valentine lost the Intercontinental Championship back to Tito Santana in a cage match. At about the same time, Nikolai Volkoff and The Iron Sheik lost the WWF Tag Team Championship back to The U.S. Express. They held the titles until August, when the team of Brutus Beefcake and Greg Valentine, later known as the Dream Team, became the new champions. On July 8, 1985, Don Muraco won the inaugural King of The Ring tournament by defeating The Iron Sheik in the finals. After André the Giant defeated Big John Studd at the event, Studd formed a tag team with King Kong Bundy, and the duo faced André and Hulk Hogan on several occasions. Later, the team of Studd and Bundy teamed up in Handicap matches—a two against one wrestling match—against André, which renewed the feud between André and Studd.

In late 1985, Wendi Richter lost her WWF Women's Championship in controversial fashion. She wrestled a masked female wrestler known as The Spider Lady, who pinned Richter to win the title. After the match, the Spider Lady was revealed as the Fabulous Moolah. This finish was a screwjob, i.e. one participant (in this case Richter) was unaware of the planned title change. Richter left the WWF shortly after, and Moolah held the title for approximately two years.

In a new storyline after WrestleMania, Roddy Piper began training Bob Orton as a boxer. Hulk Hogan accepted a challenge on the behalf of Mr. T to face Orton in a match on the February 15, 1986 Saturday Night's Main Event V. After Mr. T won the match, Orton and Piper attacked him, leading to a boxing match at WrestleMania 2 between Piper and Mr. T. At the second annual WrestleMania, Piper was disqualified in the fourth round.

The main event of this inaugural WrestleMania would also be the only time that a tag team match would be contested in the main event until WrestleMania 39 in 2023, when The Usos (Jey Uso and Jimmy Uso) defended the Undisputed WWE Tag Team Championship against Kevin Owens and Sami Zayn in the main event of Night 1, in what would also be the first time a tag team championship would be defended in the main event.

WrestleMania would become considered the company's flagship event and began broadcasting on pay-per-view (PPV) with its second event the following year. It has since become the longest-running professional wrestling event in history and is held annually between mid-March to mid-April. Following the advent of Survivor Series in 1987 and then Royal Rumble and SummerSlam in 1988—WWF's four original PPVs—the four would eventually be referred to as the "Big Four". From 1993 to 2002, these four along with King of the Ring were referred to as the "Big Five" until King of the Ring was discontinued as an annual PPV after its 2002 event, but in 2021, Money in the Bank began to be referred to as one of the "Big Five". WrestleMania would eventually be described as the Super Bowl of sports entertainment.

== Home media and streaming ==
The event was released on VHS by Coliseum Video in the United States and in 1991 by Silver Vision in the United Kingdom. The home video version removed some parts of the broadcast, such as Liberace's appearance and Junkyard Dog's entrance, but added a short introdcutory welcome package from Vince McMahon.

It was re-released on DVD in the United Kingdom in May 2004 as the first volume in Silver Vision's Tagged Classics range, and was paired with WrestleMania 2. This DVD set was not released in the USA.

In 2014, the event was included on the WWE's streaming platform the WWE Network as part of its launch and remained on the service until the platform closed in 2026. As of September 2026, subscribers in multiple territories, including the US, Canada and the UK, can stream the event on Netflix, thanks to the WWE's ten-year agreement with the company.

== Results ==
No.	Results	Stipulations	Times
1	Tito Santana defeated The Executioner by submission	Singles match	4:49
2	King Kong Bundy (with Jimmy Hart) defeated Special Delivery Jones	Singles match	0:25
3	Ricky Steamboat defeated Matt Borne	Singles match	4:39
4	Brutus Beefcake (with Johnny Valiant) vs. David Sammartino (with Bruno Sammartino) ended in a double disqualification	Singles match	11:43
5	Junkyard Dog defeated Greg Valentine (c) (with Jimmy Hart) by countout	Singles match for the WWF Intercontinental Championship	6:55
6	The Iron Sheik and Nikolai Volkoff (with Freddie Blassie) defeated the U.S. Express (Barry Windham and Mike Rotundo) (c) (with Lou Albano)	Tag team match for the WWF Tag Team Championship	6:55
7	André the Giant defeated Big John Studd (with Bobby Heenan)	Career vs. $15,000 Body Slam Challenge	5:53
8	Wendi Richter (with Cyndi Lauper) defeated Leilani Kai (c) (with The Fabulous Moolah)	Singles match for the WWF Women's Championship	6:14
9	Hulk Hogan and Mr. T (with Jimmy Snuka) defeated Paul Orndorff and Roddy Piper (with Bob Orton)	Tag team match with Muhammad Ali and Pat Patterson as special guest referees	13:34
(c) / – the champion(s) heading into the match

The WWF's official time for the match is a then-record time of nine seconds (a record since surpassed by The Rock defeating Erick Rowan at WrestleMania 32), although the match actually lasted 24 seconds.
