= The Wrestling Classic =

1985 World Wrestling Federation pay-per-view event

- Promotion: World Wrestling Federation
- Date: November 7, 1985
- City: Rosemont, Illinois
- Venue: Rosemont Horizon
- Attendance: 14,000

Pay-per-view chronology
| ← Previous; WrestleMania | Next → WrestleMania 2 |

The Wrestling Classic was a 1985 professional wrestling pay-per-view (PPV) event produced by the World Wrestling Federation (WWF, renamed WWE in 2002). It took place on November 7, 1985, at the Rosemont Horizon in the Chicago suburb of Rosemont, Illinois. It was the promotion's first ever event to be broadcast on PPV, as the preceding event, WrestleMania, had been broadcast via closed-circuit television earlier that year.

In the main event, WWF World Heavyweight Champion Hulk Hogan defeated "Rowdy" Roddy Piper by disqualification to retain the title. The undercard featured a 16-man tournament, where The Junkyard Dog defeated Randy "Macho Man " Savage in the final. The event also included a fan competition for a Rolls-Royce.

Retrospective reviews of The Wrestling Classic have been generally mixed, with negative opinions being directed towards the large number of matches and lack of stakes, though some enjoyed the tournament framing of the event. Additionally, many of the matches featuring Savage and Ricky Steamboat were noted as highlights of the event.

== Production ==
=== Background ===
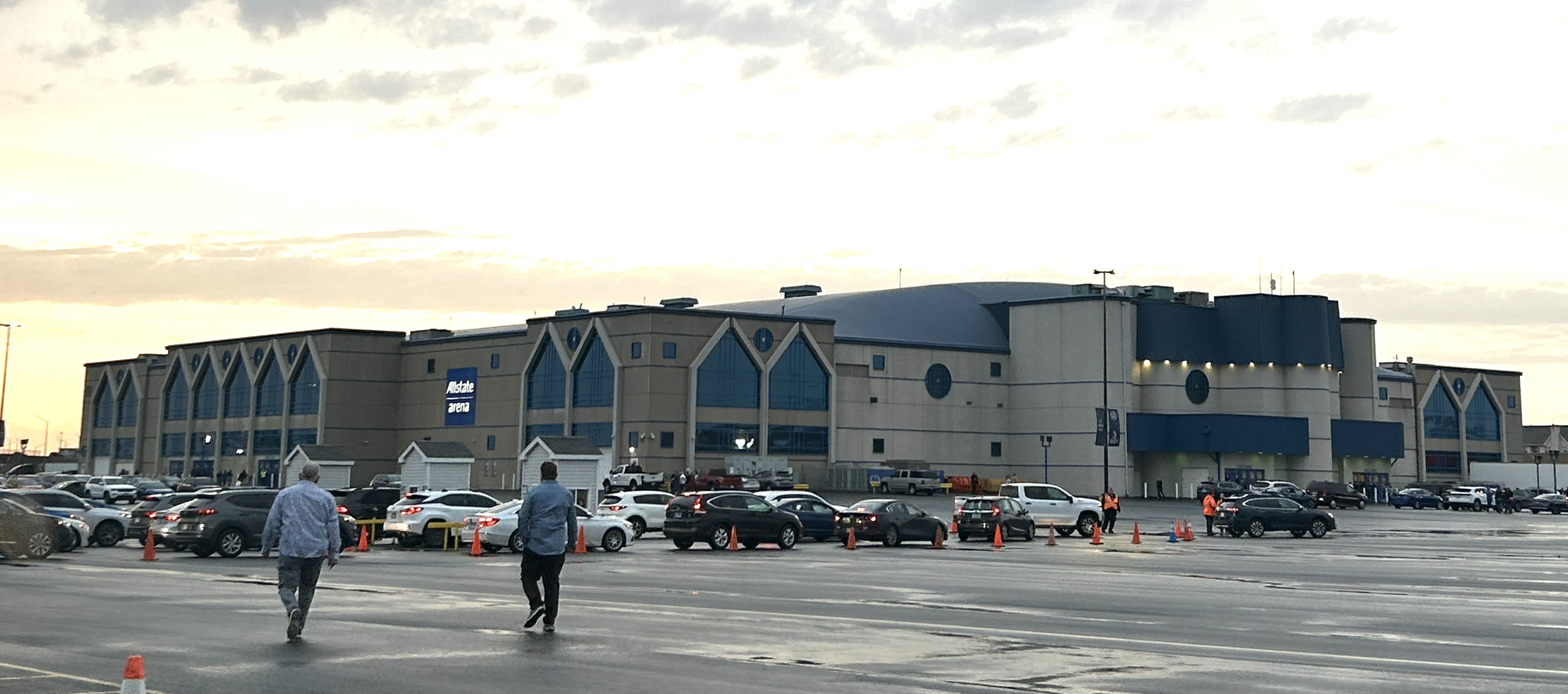
The event was held in the Chicago suburb of Rosemont, Illinois at the Rosemont Horizon (pictured as Allstate Arena, renamed in 1999).

Following the success of its first professional wrestling event WrestleMania in March 1985, which aired via closed-circuit television, the World Wrestling Federation (WWF, renamed WWE in 2002) scheduled a series of five special pay-per-view (PPV) airings to be titled "WrestleVision". In a September 1985 interview with Electronic Media, WWF owner Vince McMahon stated the first WrestleVision event would feature "the most prestigious wrestling tournament ever devised", and would feature Hulk Hogan and André the Giant. The subsequent four events were announced for January, March, May, and August 1986. The first WrestleVision event was scheduled as The Wrestling Classic on November 7, 1985, held at the Rosemont Horizon in the Chicago suburb of Rosemont, Illinois. It was the WWF's first event broadcast on PPV.

=== Storylines ===
The promotion of the event began on the October 5, 1985, episode of Championship Wrestling, with Lord Alfred Hayes announcing that there would be a 16-wrestler tournament and that a fan would win a Rolls-Royce. On the same episode, Hayes announced the group of 16 wrestlers. Of the wrestlers announced, 15 of the original appeared in the tournament as initially announced with only Moondog Spot replacing The Missing Link. Neither Hulk Hogan nor André the Giant appeared in the tournament as McMahon had announced to the press in September in his interview with Electronic Media.

The main feud heading into The Wrestling Classic was between Hulk Hogan and "Rowdy" Roddy Piper, with the two battling over the WWF World Heavyweight Championship. In 1985, Piper became the top heel of the promotion after he spoke out against the burgeoning Rock 'n' Wrestling Connection, which led to a confrontation with Hogan. In February, they faced each other on the MTV special The War to Settle the Score for Hogan's title, in which Hogan retained by disqualification. Their feud led to the WrestleMania, where in the main event, Hogan and celebrity Mr. T defeated Piper and Paul Orndorff. Hogan feuded with Piper and Cowboy Bob Orton for the rest of the year and often got disqualification victories over them, leading to a WWF World Heavyweight Championship match between Hogan and Piper at The Wrestling Classic. Despite being for the title, this bout was not announced on WWF television until the October 26, 1985, episode of Championship Wrestling, less than two weeks prior to the event and the tournament took precedent in the promotion of the card.

== Event ==
Other on-screen personnel
| Role: | Name: |
|---|---|
| Presenters | Vince McMahon |
| Presenters | Lord Alfred Hayes |
| Presenters | Susan Waitkus |
| Commentators | Gorilla Monsoon |
| Commentators | Jesse Ventura |
| Commentators | Gene Okerlund (tournament finals) |
| Interviewer | Gene Okerlund |
| Ring announcer | Howard Finkel |
| WWF President (figurehead) | Jack Tunney |

The card consisted of fifteen matches and included a 16-man tournament dubbed "The Wrestling Classic".

In the first round of the tournament, Adrian Adonis (with manager Jimmy Hart) defeated Corp. Kirchner with a DDT.

Dynamite Kid then faced Nikolai Volkoff (without manager Freddie Blassie); Dynamite Kid attacked Volkoff, who had just finished his customary singing of the Soviet national anthem, with a missile dropkick from the top turnbuckle and then quickly scored the pinfall in a match that lasted about six seconds (the official time given was nine seconds, equaling the record King Kong Bundy had set at WrestleMania).

Randy "Macho Man " Savage (with Miss Elizabeth) then defeated "Polish Power" Ivan Putski, though Savage had both his feet on the middle rope for leverage.

Ricky Steamboat faced Davey Boy Smith in a rare match pitting two fan favourites against each other. The match moved back and forth until Smith landed in the ropes trying attack Steamboat, but Steamboat sidestepped and Smith injured his groin and was unable to continue, so Steamboat was awarded the match by forfeit.

The Junkyard Dog then faced The Iron Sheik (like Volkoff, the Sheik appeared without Freddie Blassie). The match began with Sheik choking JYD with his jacket. He applied a camel clutch on JYD before releasing the hold. JYD quickly hit a headbutt on Sheik and pinned him to win the match.

Moondog Spot and Terry Funk's (with Jimmy Hart) match was next. It appeared that neither of them wanted to wrestle, so at Funk's suggestion they both left the ring. As Spot started to leave, Funk attacked him from behind and tried to re-enter the ring for a countout win, but Spot prevented him from entering the ring and Spot himself won the match by countout after Funk backdropped him into the ring before the ten count.

WWF Intercontinental Heavyweight Champion Tito Santana then faced Magnificent Muraco (with Mr. Fuji). Muraco appeared to have pinned Santana but as his feet were on the ropes, the match continued and Santana rolled up the surprised Muraco with a quick small package, scoring the pinfall. Santana suffered a groin injury that would hamper him later in the tournament.

The final match of the first round pitted Paul Orndorff against Cowboy Bob Orton. Orton was disqualified after he hit Orndorff with his cast.

The quarterfinals began with Adrian Adonis facing Dynamite Kid. During the match, Adonis accidentally collided with his manager Jimmy Hart. Dynamite Kid took advantage and pinned Adonis to win the match.

Ricky Steamboat then faced off against Randy Savage. The referee was distracted by Miss Elizabeth as Savage took advantage and pulled out brass knuckles from his tights and hit Steamboat before pinning him to win the match.

The Junkyard Dog then defeated Moondog Spot after a head butt. Strangely, there was no referee for this match and JYD counted the 3 himself. Commentators Gorilla Monsoon and Jesse Ventura then announced that a judge was at ringside and that JYD's count was legal.

Tito Santana and Paul Orndorff fought to a double count-out, eliminating both wrestlers from the tournament in the process and allowing The Junkyard Dog to advance to the finals. This led to Bobby Heenan's $50,000 storyline bounty on Paul Orndorff not being collected.

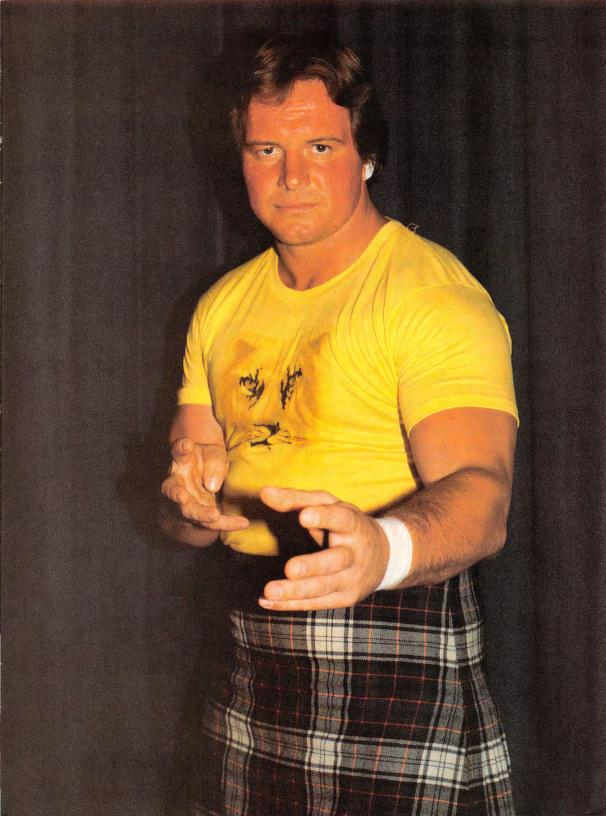
Rowdy Roddy Piper challenged Hulk Hogan for the WWF World Heavyweight Championship at The Wrestling Classic.

In the main event, which was a non-tournament match, Hulk Hogan defended his WWF World Heavyweight Championship against Rowdy Roddy Piper. Hogan applied a bearhug on Piper. Piper responded with a sleeper hold. The referee was knocked out and Piper hit Hogan with a steel chair before Hogan applied a sleeper hold of his own on Piper. Bob Orton came out and hit Hogan with his cast. The referee saw this and disqualified Piper in the process. Piper and Orton continued to assault Hogan until Paul Orndorff came out and cleared the ring.

The semi-final match between Randy Savage and Dynamite Kid was next. Dynamite Kid superplexed Savage off the top rope but Savage countered it into an inside cradle for the victory.

As part of the show, a fan competition was held. One of over 250,000 fans won a Rolls-Royce. This segment was cut from the Coliseum Home Video release for time. However, it was restored when the show aired on WWE Classics on Demand, WWE's archival video on demand service, as well as on the WWE Network.

In the finals of the tournament The Junkyard Dog wrestled Randy Savage. Shortly after the match began, Gene Okerlund joined the commentary team. Junkyard Dog hit a back body drop on Savage off the top rope who landed on the arena floor. Savage was unable to get into the ring and was counted out. As a result, The Junkyard Dog won the match and the tournament.

== Reception ==
Retrospective reviews of The Wrestling Classic have been generally mixed. Kevin Pantoja, writing for 411Mania, gave the show a score of 5.5 out of 10 ("Not So Good"), noting that the large number of matches led to many that were "bad or too short to rate", though said that very factor led to the show having a good pace. He did note that there were several good matches in the event - particularly from Savage, Steamboat, and Dynamite Kid. He closed his review saying that "the fact that this is the first PPV ever and the history factor makes this a welcome watch." Scott Keith, writing for Scott's Blog of Doom, was generally mixed on the quality of several matches, panning the Moondog/Funk match and being highly critical of the WWF World Heavyweight Championship bout. However, he overall described the event as "a fun and memorable show", highlighting the quality of Steamboat and Savage's matches, and ultimately declaring it The Wrestling Classic as "worth checking out".

== Aftermath ==
Many wrestlers received pushes by this tournament. The Junkyard Dog, the winner of this tournament got a push as he became the man to win the first-ever major tournament in WWF history. Randy "Macho Man" Savage went on to win both the WWF Intercontinental Heavyweight Championship from Tito Santana on February 8, 1986 and the WWF World Heavyweight Championship in a similar tournament at WrestleMania IV in 1988. Ricky Steamboat also won the WWF Intercontinental Heavyweight Championship, by defeating Savage at WrestleMania III in 1987. Dynamite Kid and Davey Boy Smith who together were The British Bulldogs would go on to win the WWF Tag Team Championship at WrestleMania 2 in 1986.

Unlike WrestleMania, The Wrestling Classic would be a one-off event as the remaining four WrestleVision branded events did not take place as announced by McMahon. Electronic Media stated in March 1986 that "WrestleVision, which followed [WrestleMania] in November, was something of a dud" and quoted McMahon as saying "all of our guns weren't loaded for WrestleVision as they were for WrestleMania" in reference to the remaining four events' cancelations.

== Results ==
| No. | Results | Stipulations | Times |
|---|---|---|---|
| 1 | Adrian Adonis (with Jimmy Hart) defeated Corporal Kirchner | First round tournament match | 3:20 |
| 2 | Dynamite Kid defeated Nikolai Volkoff | First round tournament match | 0:09 |
| 3 | Randy Savage (with Miss Elizabeth) defeated Ivan Putski | First round tournament match | 2:45 |
| 4 | Ricky Steamboat defeated Davey Boy Smith by forfeit | First round tournament match | 2:53 |
| 5 | Junkyard Dog defeated The Iron Sheik | First round tournament match | 3:25 |
| 6 | Moondog Spot defeated Terry Funk (with Jimmy Hart) by countout | First round tournament match | 0:27 |
| 7 | Tito Santana defeated Magnificent Muraco (with Mr. Fuji) | First round tournament match | 4:17 |
| 8 | Paul Orndorff defeated Cowboy Bob Orton by disqualification | First round tournament match | 6:28 |
| 9 | Dynamite Kid defeated Adrian Adonis (with Jimmy Hart) | Quarter final tournament match | 6:00 |
| 10 | Randy Savage (with Miss Elizabeth) defeated Ricky Steamboat | Quarter final tournament match | 4:00 |
| 11 | Junkyard Dog defeated Moondog Spot | Quarter final tournament match | 0:45 |
| 12 | Tito Santana vs. Paul Orndorff ended in a double countout. | Quarter final tournament match | 8:00 |
| 13 | Hulk Hogan (c) defeated Roddy Piper by disqualification | Singles match for the WWF World Heavyweight Championship | 7:00 |
| 14 | Randy Savage (with Miss Elizabeth) defeated Dynamite Kid | Semi-final tournament match | 5:00 |
| 15 | Junkyard Dog defeated Randy Savage (with Miss Elizabeth) by countout | Tournament finals match | 9:00 |
(c) / – the champion(s) heading into the match

=== Tournament bracket ===
1st Round; The Wrestling Classic; November 7, 1985
Adrian Adonis | Pinfall
Corporal Kirchner | 3:20
Dynamite Kid | Pinfall
Nikolai Volkoff | 0:09
Ivan Putski | 2:45
Randy Savage | Pinfall
Ricky Steamboat | Forfeit
Davey Boy Smith | 2:53
The Iron Sheik | 3:25
Junkyard Dog | Pinfall
Moondog Spot | Countout
Terry Funk | 0:27
Tito Santana | Pinfall
Magnificent Muraco | 4:17
Cowboy Bob Orton | 6:28
Paul Orndorff | Disqualification

Quarterfinals; The Wrestling Classic; November 7, 1985
Adrian Adonis | 6:00
Dynamite Kid | Pinfall
Randy Savage | Pinfall
Ricky Steamboat | 4:00
Junkyard Dog | Pinfall
Moondog Spot | 0:45
Tito Santana | Countout (8:00)
Paul Orndorff | Countout (8:00)

Semifinals; The Wrestling Classic; November 7, 1985
Dynamite Kid | 5:00
Randy Savage | Pinfall
Junkyard Dog | Bye
N/A | —

Final; The Wrestling Classic; November 7, 1985
Randy Savage | 9:00
Junkyard Dog | Countout
