= WWF All American Wrestling =

Former WWF television program

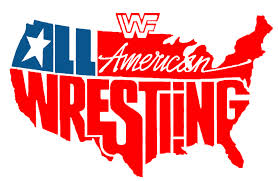
- Created by: Vince McMahon
- Starring: World Wrestling Federation roster
- Country of origin: United States

Production
- Running time: 60 minutes

Original release
- Network: USA Network
- Release: September 4, 1983 – October 16, 1994

WWF All American Wrestling, or simply All American Wrestling, was a cable television program produced by the World Wrestling Federation (WWF). The show was a predecessor to Tuesday Night Titans and Saturday Night's Main Event, originally filling the 11:00 a.m. Eastern Time slot on Sundays vacated by the cancellation of Southwest Championship Wrestling. The show ran from September 4, 1983, to October 16, 1994, on the USA Network. After it was canceled in 1994, it was replaced by Action Zone. The longest running host of the show was Gene Okerlund, who hosted it for nine years of its run.

== Overview ==
All American Wrestling went through three different formats during its run. The first incarnation of WWF All American Wrestling was a show that would focus on one specific wrestler in the WWF. After a few weeks, it turned into a program that featured mainly high-card wrestlers from various promotions across the United States. However, after a few months it featured WWF talent only. Although the USA Cable Network had carried WWF events from New York's Madison Square Garden and the Capital Centre in Landover, Maryland, this was the first weekly national telecast of the original flagship shows for the World Wrestling Federation.

The show mainly re-aired matches and segments from other WWF programs and featured one exclusive match, which early in the run typically came from one of the monthly house show tapings in Madison Square Garden, Philadelphia Spectrum, Boston Garden, or Maple Leaf Gardens. Vince McMahon was the original host of the program, and from then on would fill-in for other hosts as emergency replacements as late as 1994. Afterward, Lord Alfred Hayes became host. Subsequently, Gene Okerlund took over hosting duties and stayed there for most of its run. Okerlund hosted in the WWF Production studio, often interacting with staff members and asking for their thoughts and opinions on the various goings-on in the WWF. Another of Okerlund's running bits was him pretending to be on the phone with someone, often a famous celebrity. Oftentimes a guest wrestler or personality would stop in and hang out with Okerlund, Bobby Heenan being one of the most common guests, along with former co-host Alfred Hayes. Starting in 1989, Okerlund was sometimes joined by Hillbilly Jim, with Jim becoming a full-time regular of the show later that year.

Okerlund and Hillbilly Jim remained hosts until approximately 1991. After Jim left the show to work in the WWF's home video department, Okerlund would later have various guests hosts in 1992, including The Brooklyn Brawler in a rare appearance. The show featured a major overhaul in 1993 when Bobby Heenan took over as co-host along with Okerlund, with each episode taking place in a different part of the country, with Okerlund and Heenan visiting (often with the help of a green screen) various landmarks. One notable episode took place before WrestleMania 9, with Okerlund and Heenan infiltrating WWF headquarters to try to get a word in with Jack Tunney while giving viewers a tour of the building. This episode featured a rare, on-camera appearance by J. J. Dillon during his tenure with the WWF. Another episode featured Sensational Sherri in one of her final appearances before leaving the WWF.

After Okerlund left in 1993 due to a contract dispute, Joe Fowler took Okerlund's place, working alongside Heenan and continuing the trend of hosting at a landmark or on-location. Johnny Polo was added as co-host to replace Bobby Heenan, and then the on-location aspect of the show was dropped, with the show taking place inside a studio. Polo hosted alongside Gorilla Monsoon, though both would be replaced by The final hosts of All American Wrestling, Todd Pettengill and Ted DiBiase.

In 1993, the matches that were re-aired from other programming would feature new commentary from Sean Mooney, Lord Alfred Hayes, Gorilla Monsoon, Jim Ross, and The Wizard, a persona taken on by Bruce Prichard.

== "The Bottom Line" ==
After Wrestlemania X, Roddy Piper was added to the show as a regular with a weekly segment titled The Bottom Line. In this segment Piper mainly commented on the various storylines going on in the WWF, along with comments on his then budding feud with Jerry Lawler. Piper hosted this segment regularly until the late summer.

== Hosts ==
- Vince McMahon (1983–84; guest appearances after)
- Lord Alfred Hayes (1984–85; various guest appearances after)
- Gene Okerlund (1984–93; guest appearances before)
- Hillbilly Jim (1989–91)
- Randy Savage (1991)
- Mr. Perfect (1992)
- Bobby Heenan (1993; guest appearances before)
- Johnny Polo (1993–94)
- Joe Fowler (1993)
- Gorilla Monsoon (1994; guest appearances before)
- Todd Pettengill (1994)
- Ted Dibiase (1994)
- Roddy Piper (1994; "The Bottom Line" host)
