= Chet Coppock =

American broadcaster (1948–2019)

- Born: April 30, 1948; Winnetka, Illinois, U.S.
- Died: April 17, 2019 (aged 70); Savannah, Georgia, U.S.
- Education: Menomonee Falls High School
- Occupations: Broadcaster, sports talk personality, writer, spokesperson
- Years active: 1965–2019
- Employer(s): WMAQ; WSNS-TV; WISH-TV

Chet W. Coppock (April 30, 1948 – April 17, 2019) was an American radio broadcaster, television broadcaster, sports talk personality and author based in Chicago. His fifth book “Chet Coppock: In Pursuit of Chet Coppock” was released in July 2018. Coppock hosted the Chicago Blackhawks Heritage Series, and emceed corporate sponsorship events for the Blackhawks featuring former NHL stars such as Bobby Hull, Tony Esposito and Denis Savard.

He was an occasional contributor to the Rant and Rave segment on FOX 32 Chicago (WFLD) with Lou Canellis. In 2013, Coppock was inducted into the Chicagoland Sports Hall of Fame and honored with the Jack Brickhouse Lifetime Achievement Award.

Additionally, Coppock had served as state chairman of Indiana Easter Seals and Indiana March of Dimes, a national spokesman for the Brain Aneurysm Foundation (BAF), and had worked with other charities and foundations to help raise awareness, generate support, and increase research funding. Coppock was also a spokesperson for American Taxi and had done commercial work in the past for clients including McDonald's, Wheaties (National TV spots), Chevrolet and P.F. Chang's — appearing with Chicago sports legends Michael Jordan and Walter Payton. Coppock also participated as a ring announcer for Wrestlemania 2 at the Rosemont Horizon in Rosemont, Ill

== Biography ==
=== Broadcasting career ===
In 1966, at age 17, Coppock broadcast football and basketball on WNTH radio, the school radio station at New Trier High School in Winnetka, IL.

In 1970–1971, Coppock was hired to produce the Milwaukee Bucks radio network. Coppock hosted Sport Rap, a nightly Chicago TV talk show on WSNS TV, before eventually becoming a staff announcer with WFLD TV in Chicago. While at WFLD, Coppock developed a friendship with promoter Jerry Seltzer. The association soon led Coppock into a role as the national TV voice of the Roller Derby, a position he occupied for several years. In the mid-1970s, Coppock held a six-year tenure as sports director at then CBS-affiliate WISH-TV (now a CW affiliate) in Indianapolis. His anchor desk partners included Jane Pauley.

In 1981, Coppock returned to Chicago and joined WMAQ-TV for three years. In 1981, he was awarded a UPI Award in the category of Illinois Broadcasting and Best Sports. In 1984, while working as sports director at WMAQ radio, Coppock approached the station about creating an in-depth, interview-driven radio sports talk show. The move led to the creation of Coppock on Sports, a show in which Coppock spoke with athletes, coaches, GMs and media members in a longer, un-cut magazine format. In 1986, Coppock served as ring announcer during the Chicago portion of WrestleMania 2. Coppock's other appearances for the World Wrestling Federation include his role as commentator alongside Gorilla Monsoon for RadioWWF at WrestleMania X. He also promoted wrestling events featuring such competitors as Verne Gagne, Baron von Raschke, and Dick the Bruiser. Some of these shows were held at Chicago's Comiskey Park. In 1988, Coppock moved to WLUP in Chicago to continue Coppock on Sports and also host the pre-game, half-time and post-game shows for the Chicago Bulls radio network.

Coppock hosted Back Table, an interview show that was carried by SportsChannel/Fox Sports Net. He also co-hosted The Mike Ditka Radio Show as well as talk shows featuring NBA coaches Phil Jackson and Doug Collins. In 1990–1991 Coppock served as the studio host for the NBA radio network. In 1992, he received a Chicago/Midwest Area Emmy Award for his work on Chicago Bears Weekly. In 1994, Coppock hosted NewSportTalk on Cablevision in New York and was one of sixty notable Chicagoans featured in the book Great Chicago Stories: Portraits and Stories by Sam Landers. In the late 90s, Coppock was heard on Fox Sports Net Chicago and WMAQ 670 AM Chicago. In 1999, Coppock received the Peter Lisagor Award for Journalistic Excellence.

From August 2000 to February 2006, Coppock on Sports made a return to the airwaves on Sporting News Radio. Between 2006 and 2015, Coppock hosted Notre Dame football and basketball pregame and postgame shows on WLS Radio. In 2009, Coppock launched the Coppock On Sports podcast, featured in the podcast section of Apple's iTunes store. The podcast featured regular appearances from ESPN Legal Analyst Lester Munson, and former MLB 31-game winner Denny McClain. In 2009, Coppock penned the Coppock on Sports blog, covering Chicago sports for www.ChicagoNow.com. Also in 2009, Coppock published his first book titled, Fat Guys Shouldn't be Dancin' at Halftime, published by Triumph Books.

Coppock hosted The Winning Edge on the Discovery Channel. In 2011, Coppock appeared as a featured content contributor for the Heritage Series on the Chicago Blackhawks website, and continued to occasionally emcee Blackhawks events. In 2011, Coppock launched DailyCoppock.com with business partner Michael Romano. DailyCoppock.com featured Coppock's video blogs, Coppock's magazine-style video interviews with sports headliners, and Coppock's written blogs on sports and culture. In 2013, Coppock was named the recipient of the "Jack Brickhouse Lifetime Achievement Award" by the Chicago Sports Hall of Fame. Coppock is an occasional contributor to the "Rant and Rave" segment on FOX 32 Chicago (WFLD) with anchor Lou Canellis. In 2014, Coppock published his second book titled, Chet Coppock: Laying it on the Line, self-published. In 2015, Coppock published his third book titled Buffone: Monster of the Midway: My 50 Years with the Chicago Bears, published by Triumph Books.

=== Movie career ===
In 2007, Coppock served as a football consultant and had an on camera role in the motion picture "The Express: The Ernie Davis Story" starring Dennis Quaid and Rob Brown. The film was released in October 2008.

== Personal life ==
On February 14, 2007, Coppock was attacked in the parking lot following a DePaul University basketball game in Rosemont, Illinois. Jaime A. Waldron of Milwaukee, Wisconsin was found guilty of battery after pleading not guilty, and he was sentenced to 40 hours of community service and ordered to pay court costs.

Coppock was involved in a car accident in Okatie, South Carolina, on April 6, 2019. He was taken to Memorial University Medical Center in Savannah, Georgia, where he died from injuries sustained in the accident on April 17.

== Books ==
Coppock published five books: "If These Walls Could Talk: Stories from the Chicago Bears Sideline, Locker Room, and Press Box with Otis Wilson" (Triumph Books, 2017), "Fat Guys shouldn't be Dancin' at Half Time" (Triumph Books, 2009), "Chet Coppock: Laying it On the Line" (Self Published, 2014), "Buffone: Monster of the Midway: My 50 Years with the Chicago Bears" (Triumph Books, 2015). and Your Dime, My Dance Floor (Eckhartz Press, 2018).
