= WrestleMania 2 =

1986 World Wrestling Federation pay-per-view event

- Promotional poster featuring Hulk Hogan and King Kong Bundy
- Promotion: World Wrestling Federation
- Date: April 7, 1986
- City: Uniondale, New York; Rosemont, Illinois; Los Angeles, California
- Venue: Nassau Veterans Memorial Coliseum; Rosemont Horizon; Los Angeles Memorial Sports Arena
- Attendance: 40,085 (combined)
- Tagline(s): The Premier Sporting Event of the Year! What the World Has Come To!

Pay-per-view chronology
← Previous; The Wrestling Classic	Next → WrestleMania III

WrestleMania chronology
← Previous; I	Next → III

WrestleMania 2 was a 1986 professional wrestling pay-per-view (PPV) event produced by the World Wrestling Federation (WWF, renamed WWE in 2002). It was the second annual WrestleMania and took place on Monday, April 7, 1986, making it the only WrestleMania that was not held on a traditional Sunday until the two-night WrestleMania 36 in April 2020. The event took place at three venues on the same day: first at the Nassau Veterans Memorial Coliseum in Uniondale, New York; then at the Rosemont Horizon in the Chicago suburb of Rosemont, Illinois; and finally at the Los Angeles Memorial Sports Arena in Los Angeles, California.

Each venue had its own card of four matches each, totaling 12 matches for the PPV broadcast shown back-to-back-to-back. The main event of WrestleMania 2, which was in Los Angeles, featured WWF World Heavyweight Champion Hulk Hogan defending the title against King Kong Bundy in a steel cage match. In the last match in Chicago, The British Bulldogs (Davey Boy Smith and The Dynamite Kid) faced The Dream Team (Greg Valentine and Brutus Beefcake) for the WWF Tag Team Championship, while the final match in Uniondale was a boxing match pitting Mr. T against Roddy Piper. The undercard in Uniondale also saw WWF Intercontinental Heavyweight Champion Randy Savage defend his title against George Steele, while the card in Chicago featured a 20-man battle royal involving WWF wrestlers and National Football League players.

WrestleMania 2 was the first WrestleMania to broadcast on PPV, after the inaugural WrestleMania aired via closed-circuit television. The event received generally poor reviews, with much of the criticism being centered around holding it as three separate events across the country. Many publications rank it as amongst the worst WrestleMania events of all time.

== Production ==
=== Background ===
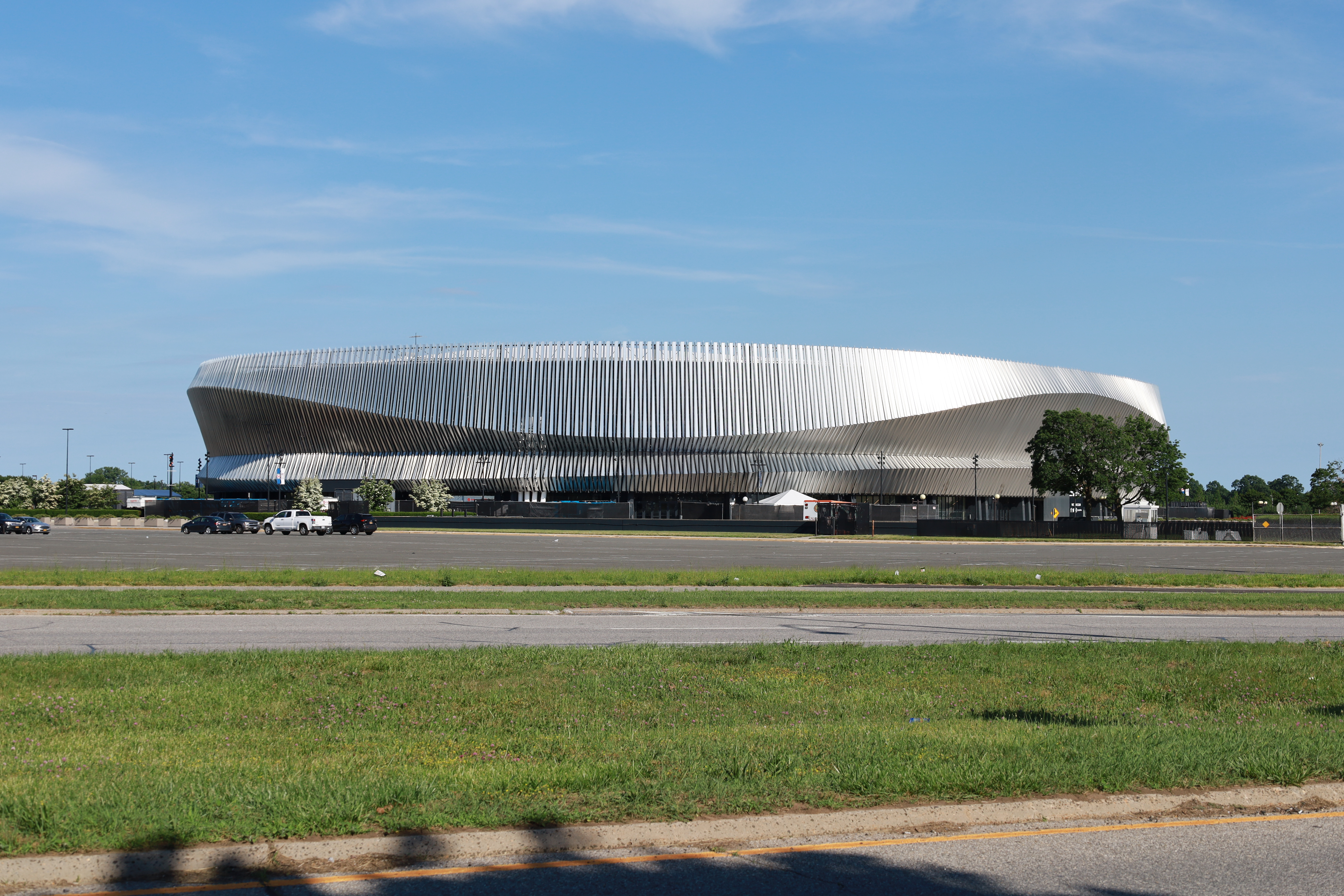
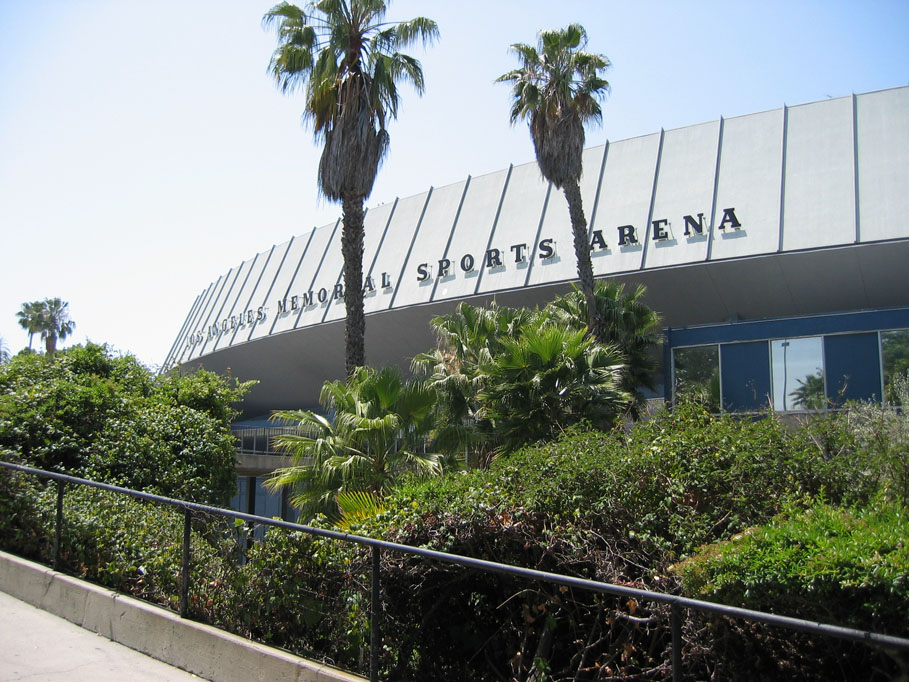
The second annual WrestleMania was held at three venues the same day: the Nassau Veterans Memorial Coliseum in Uniondale, New York; the Rosemont Horizon (pictured as Allstate Arena, renamed in 1999) in the Chicago suburb of Rosemont, Illinois; and the Los Angeles Memorial Sports Arena in Los Angeles, California.

Following the success of WrestleMania I in 1985, the American professional wrestling promotion World Wrestling Federation (WWF, renamed WWE in 2002) scheduled a second WrestleMania for the following year, thus establishing WrestleMania as an annual event for the company. Unlike the previous year, which aired via closed-circuit television, WrestleMania 2 was broadcast on pay-per-view (PPV). Also unlike the first event, WrestleMania 2 was scheduled to be held at three venues on Monday, April 7, 1986: the Nassau Veterans Memorial Coliseum in Uniondale, New York, the Rosemont Horizon in the Chicago suburb of Rosemont, Illinois, and the Los Angeles Memorial Sports Arena in Los Angeles, California. Each location was scheduled to have its own card of four matches each, which were broadcast back-to-back-to-back, starting in Uniondale, then Chicago, and finally Los Angeles.

=== Broadcasters ===
The event featured separate commentary and announce teams in each location. The commentating teams consisted of Vince McMahon and Susan Saint James in New York; Gorilla Monsoon, Gene Okerlund, and Cathy Lee Crosby in Chicago; and Jesse Ventura, Alfred Hayes, and Elvira in Los Angeles. The ring announcers were Howard Finkel (New York), Chet Coppock (Chicago), and Lee Marshall (Los Angeles).

=== Celebrities ===
Ray Charles sang a rendition of "America the Beautiful" before the show at the Nassau Veterans Memorial Coliseum in New York. Celebrity guests in attendance for the New York segment included: Cab Calloway, Darryl Dawkins, G. Gordon Liddy, Joan Rivers, Joe Frazier, Lou Duva, Herb, and Susan Saint James. Celebrity guests in attendance for the Chicago segment included: Clara Peller, Dick Butkus, Ed Jones, Ozzy Osbourne, Bill Fralic, Ernie Holmes, Harvey Martin, Jim Covert, Russ Francis, William Perry, and Cathy Lee Crosby. The Los Angeles segment included celebrity guests Ricky Schroder, Robert Conrad, Tommy Lasorda, and Elvira.

=== Storylines ===
The card featured 12 matches, which resulted from scripted storylines and had results predetermined by the WWF. Building to the event, storylines between characters played out on WWF's primary television programs, Championship Wrestling, All-Star Wrestling, Saturday Night's Main Event and Prime Time Wrestling.

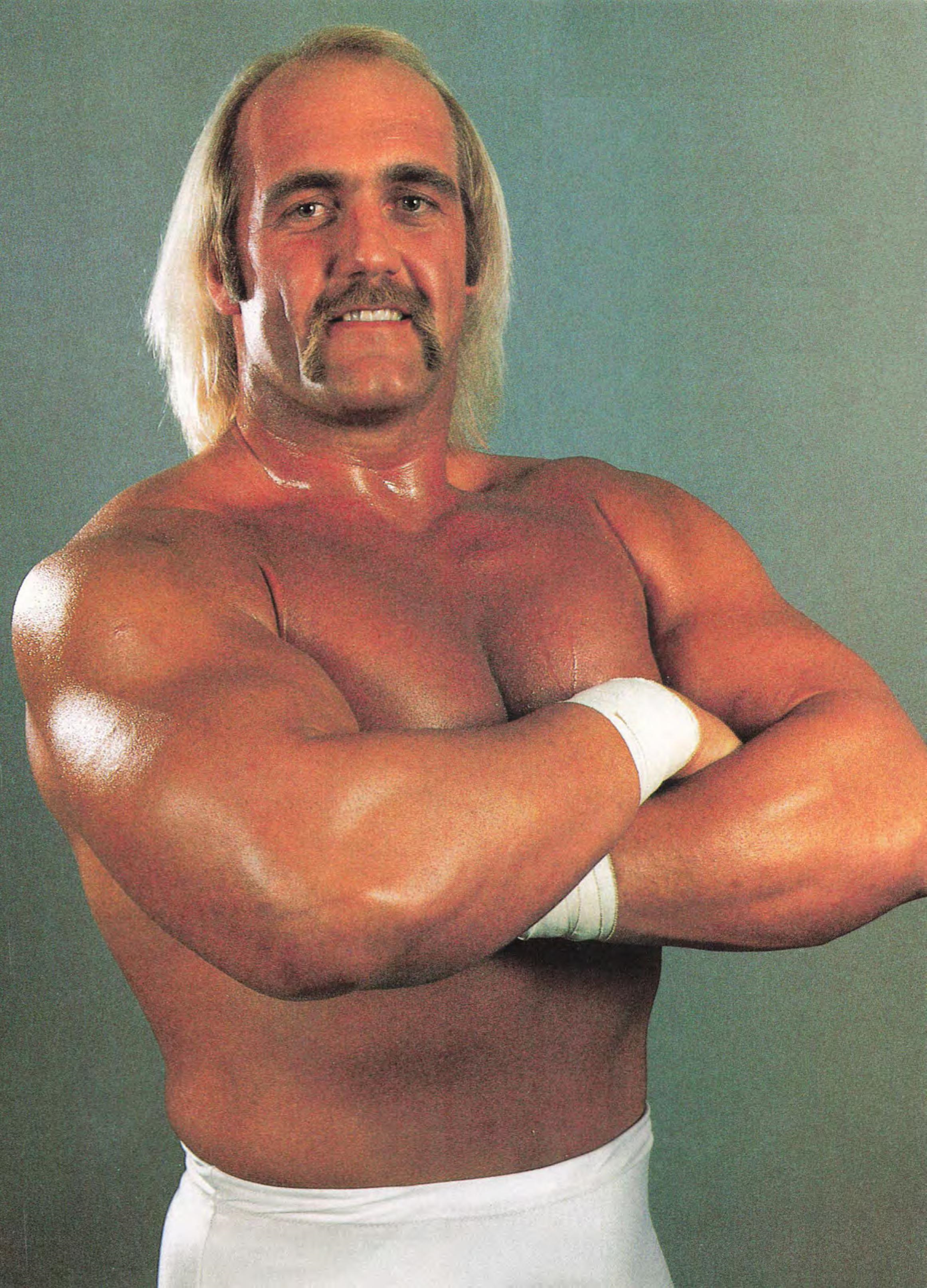
Hulk Hogan faced King Kong Bundy in a Steel Cage match for the WWF World Heavyweight Championship at WrestleMania.

Three of the main-event feuds were set up on the March 1, 1986, Saturday Night's Main Event V. The main feud heading into WrestleMania 2 was between Hulk Hogan and King Kong Bundy, with the two battling over the WWF World Heavyweight Championship. Although they had wrestled occasionally before, their first nationally televised encounter was on the November 2, 1985, Saturday Night's Main Event III where Hogan teamed up with André the Giant against André's rivals Bundy and Big John Studd. Hogan and André won the match by disqualification. On March 1, Hogan defended his WWF title against The Magnificent Muraco. Just as Hogan was about to pin Muraco, Bundy ran into the ring and—with Muraco's help—initiated a 2-on-1 assault on Hogan, repeatedly crushing him with his body weight (with a move called the "avalanche") to break his ribs. Hogan had a very serious (scripted) injury, while Bundy (gloating over his actions) challenged Hogan for the title. With revenge on his mind, Hogan decided not to heed his doctor's advice and accepted the challenge; a match was then booked between the two in a steel cage for the WWF title.

The second feud heading into the event was between Mr. T and Roddy Piper. Piper established himself as the top heel in the WWF in 1984. A year later, he joined Paul Orndorff and Bob Orton to feud with Hulk Hogan and Mr. T who defeated them in the main event of the first-ever WrestleMania. The Piper/Mr. T feud restarted in 1986 after their real-life hatred for each other became known, prompting the WWF to turn their animosity for one another into a feud. Piper, and others in the locker room, genuinely disliked Mr. T because he was an actor and had no prior wrestling training. In response, Mr. T became a special WWF boxer and began competing in boxing matches. On the March 1 Saturday Night's Main Event V, Mr. T defeated Orton in a boxing match. After the match, Piper distracted Mr. T, allowing Orton to attack from behind and start a 2-on-1 assault. Mr. T then demanded revenge, leading to his boxing match against Piper.

The third main feud heading into WrestleMania was between The Dream Team (Greg Valentine and Brutus Beefcake) and The British Bulldogs (Davey Boy Smith and Dynamite Kid) over the WWF Tag Team Championship. On August 24, 1985, Beefcake and Valentine won the tag titles from The U.S. Express (Barry Windham and Mike Rotundo). The British Bulldogs challenged Beefcake and Valentine for their titles immediately after their win. They retained their titles against the Bulldogs at a house show on September 11 by getting disqualified. They again defended the titles against the Bulldogs Saturday Night's Main Event V, where they emerged victorious against them. After the Bulldogs twice failed to win the titles, Dream Team agreed to defend their titles against them for a final time with a title match set at WrestleMania.

The other major feud heading into WrestleMania 2 was between Randy Savage and George Steele. Its genesis came after Steele, who used a neanderthal, "missing link"-type gimmick, became smitten with Savage's manager, the beautiful Miss Elizabeth (Savage's real-life wife, although unacknowledged on television). Their first meeting took place on Saturday Night's Main Event IV, before Savage won the Intercontinental Championship. Steele would frequently be distracted by Elizabeth, which Savage used to his advantage. Along with former champion Tito Santana (who was on the Los Angeles segment of the event), Steele became one of Savage's top challengers for the title.

== Event ==
WrestleMania 2 emanated from three arenas: Nassau Veterans Memorial Coliseum in Uniondale, New York, the Rosemont Horizon in Rosemont, Illinois and the Los Angeles Memorial Sports Arena in Los Angeles.

=== New York ===
Randy Savage vs. George Steele for the WWF Intercontinental Heavyweight Championship

In the first match of the show in the New York arena, Paul Orndorff faced The Magnificent Muraco. In the early part of the match, Orndorff body slammed Muraco. As the crowd reacted and Orndorff celebrated, he turned towards Mr. Fuji and made a racist, slanty-eyed gesture followed by an Italian salute. This controversial moment is edited out of most home video versions of the match and is edited out of the versions shown on Peacock and Netflix. Both men fought to a double count-out.

Next was a WWF Intercontinental Heavyweight Championship match between Randy Savage and George Steele, where Savage was seconded by his real-life wife Miss Elizabeth. Late in the match, Steele became the first man to ever kick out of Savage's signature elbow drop from the top turnbuckle. Savage pinned Steele with a roll-up and put both of his feet on the ropes for leverage. As a result, Savage retained the Intercontinental Heavyweight Title.

The third match was between Jake Roberts and George Wells. Roberts hit a DDT on Wells and pinned him to win the match. After the match, Roberts allowed his snake Damian to slither over Wells, who foamed from the mouth.

The last match was a boxing match between Mr. T and Roddy Piper. T was seconded by boxer Joe Frazier, while Piper was seconded by boxing trainer Lou Duva. Piper was disqualified for bodyslamming T at 1:15 in the fourth round.

Other on-screen personnel
Role:	Name:
Commentator	Vince McMahon (New York)
Commentator	Gorilla Monsoon (Chicago)
Commentator	Gene Okerlund (Chicago)
Commentator	Jesse Ventura (Los Angeles)
Commentator	Lord Alfred Hayes (Los Angeles)
Ring announcer	Howard Finkel (New York)
Ring announcer	Chet Coppock (Chicago)
Ring announcer	Lee Marshall (Los Angeles)
Ring announcer	Joan Rivers (New York; Piper vs Mr. T)
Ring announcer	Tommy Lasorda (Los Angeles; Main Event)
Referees	Dick Kroll
Referees	Jack Lotz
Referees	Dave Hebner
Special Guest Referees	Dick Butkus (battle royal)
Special Guest Referees	Ed "Too Tall" Jones (battle royal)
Special Guest Referees	Robert Conrad (Los Angeles; main event)
Special Guest Commentators	Susan Saint James (New York)
Special Guest Commentators	Cathy Lee Crosby (Chicago)
Special Guest Commentators	Ernie Ladd (Chicago)
Special Guest Commentators	Elvira (Los Angeles)
Special Guest Timekeepers	Herb (New York)
Special Guest Timekeepers	Clara Peller (Chicago)
Special Guest Timekeepers	Ricky Schroder (Los Angeles)
Special Guest Vocalist	Ray Charles (New York)

=== Chicago ===
The first match from the Chicago portion of WrestleMania 2 was a WWF Women's Championship match between The Fabulous Moolah and Velvet McIntyre. McIntyre attempted a splash on Moolah from the second turnbuckle, but Moolah sidestepped and McIntyre missed the move. Moolah took advantage and pinned McIntyre to retain her title.

The second match was a flag match between Corporal Kirchner and Nikolai Volkoff. Freddie Blassie seconded Volkoff. Blassie threw his cane to Volkoff, but Kirchner caught it and hit Volkoff with it, pinning him for the victory.

The third match was a 20-man battle royal involving WWF wrestlers and National Football League players including: Jimbo Covert, Bill Fralic, Russ Francis, Ernie Holmes, Harvey Martin and William "The Refrigerator" Perry. The WWF stars included: André the Giant, Ted Arcidi, Tony Atlas, The Hart Foundation (Bret Hart and Jim Neidhart), The Killer Bees (B. Brian Blair and Jim Brunzell), Hillbilly Jim, The Iron Sheik, King Tonga, Pedro Morales, Bruno Sammartino, Danny Spivey and Big John Studd. In the end of the match, André the Giant and both members of the Hart Foundation were the final three participants. André first eliminated Neidhart and then Hart to win the battle royal.

The last match was a WWF Tag Team Championship match between The British Bulldogs (Davey Boy Smith and Dynamite Kid) and The Dream Team (Greg Valentine and Brutus Beefcake). Ozzy Osbourne and Lou Albano seconded the Bulldogs. After 13 minutes of back-and-forth action, Smith pushed Valentine into the corner where Valentine knocked heads with Dynamite Kid. Kid fell to the floor while Smith pinned Valentine to win the tag titles and end Dream Team's seven-month reign.

=== Los Angeles ===
Hulk Hogan faced King Kong Bundy for the WWF World Heavyweight Championship.

In Los Angeles, there were four more matches. Ricky Steamboat faced Hercules in the first match. Hercules tried to hit a flying bodypress, but missed it. Steamboat followed by hitting a flying body press of his own for a pinfall victory.

Adrian Adonis, seconded by Jimmy Hart, defeated Uncle Elmer after a diving headbutt.

The Funk Brothers faced Junkyard Dog and Tito Santana in a tag team match. Jimmy Hart accompanied the Funk brothers. Hoss Funk distracted the referee. Hart took advantage and gave his megaphone to Terry Funk, who hit Junkyard Dog and then pinned him to get the win.

Finally, the main event of WrestleMania 2: a WWF World Heavyweight Championship steel cage match in which Hulk Hogan defended his title against King Kong Bundy. Hogan's ribs were heavily taped due to an assault by Bundy on the March 1, 1986 edition of Saturday Night's Main Event V. Bobby Heenan seconded Bundy in the match. At the start, Bundy removed the tape from Hogan's ribs. However, Hogan fought back and rammed Bundy's head into the steel cage. He then tried to hit a scoop slam on Bundy, but missed it. Bundy hit an avalanche and a big splash on Hogan. However, Hogan "Hulked up" and hit a power slam on Bundy, followed by a leg drop. He climbed the steel cage, but Bundy caught his legs. Hogan kicked Bundy and climbed over the top of the steel cage and down to the floor to win the match and retain the title. After the match, Hogan caught Bobby Heenan inside the cage; as Bundy was reeling from the match, Hogan rammed Heenan's head into the cage before atomic dropping him outside.

== Reception ==
Critical response to the show was poor, with the decision to host the show in three locations being highly criticized. John Canton, of TJRwrestling.net said: "I'm sure that the idea of doing this show from three different venues sounded like a good idea on paper to Vince McMahon, but it was not effective in terms of producing a quality program." Voices of Wrestling's Bryan Rose commented that he could "see why WWE went with just one arena from this point forward". Jason Powell of Prowrestling.net was also happy to learn that subsequent WrestleManias would not be held in three arenas, saying "Overall, WrestleMania 2 was excessive. The idea of running the show in three separate markets was an ill-conceived cash grab and I'm happy they never went down that road again."

Hulk Hogan vs King Kong Bundy "felt more like a Saturday Night Main Event match than a WrestleMania main event.

— Rob McNew of 411mania

John Canton, of TJR Retro was also very critical of the show's promoted main events. He commented that "every one of the big matches on the show was a disappointment from the Hogan/Bundy cage match, the battle royal and the Piper/Mr. T boxing match. If the big matches are that poor it hurts the whole show."

411Mania.com's Rob McNew also had a negative opinion of the three "main" matches. McNew gave the boxing match 1 star out of 5 stars, saying: "Big pull-apart brawl afterward. Absolute crap that took way too long and ended in a non-finish." He gave the steel cage match between Hogan and Bundy 2 stars, saying it "felt more like a Saturday Night Main Event match than a WrestleMania main event". McNew awarded the entire event a score of 2 out of 10 and said: "It lacks the historical significance of WrestleMania I to even watch it for that purpose. This was three hours of pain I'd love to have back. Thankfully the WWF would redeem themselves in a huge way the next year, but for this show, huge disappointment."

However, of the WWF Tag Team Championship match, McNew said: "Tremendous match that breaks the streak of suck that had been this show thus far. One of the things that I really liked about this match was it seemed to break from the traditional tag team formula. There was no extended face in peril sequence nor was there a hot tag at any point. Easily the match of the night." He awarded it three and a half stars out of five. Despite general poor reviews for WrestleMania 2, Brandon Stroud from Uproxx, called the event superior to WrestleMania I, commenting: "WrestleMania 2 is (believe it or not) a gigantic improvement over WrestleMania I... It's not the best show ever—it's nowhere near as important as III, and we wouldn't get a great-in-total WrestleMania until X—but it's the kind of thing that kicks your ass when you're a kid, and that's important."

WrestleMania 2 is frequently listed by publications as amongst the worst WrestleMania events of all time, with some ranking it as the worst. Sports Illustrated summed up the event as "Probably wouldn't have been great even if it was all in one city, but splitting it definitely didn't help."

== Aftermath ==
Randy Savage and George Steele continued their feud with each other throughout 1986. This led to two rematches for the WWF Intercontinental Heavyweight Championship on Saturday Night's Main Event IX in early 1987, both times with the Intercontinental title on the line and the second time with the management services of Elizabeth on the line; Steele lost both times. Savage also feuded intensely with Hogan, but was unsuccessful in winning the WWF World Heavyweight Championship from him.

The new WWF Tag Team Champions The British Bulldogs (Davey Boy Smith and Dynamite Kid) prepared to face challenging tag teams. On October 4, 1986, Saturday Night's Main Event VII, they defeated former champions Dream Team (Greg Valentine and Brutus Beefcake) in a two out of three falls match to retain the titles.

Hulk Hogan continued his WWF World Heavyweight Championship reign. In addition to Savage, his top competition during 1986 included "Adorable Adrian" Adonis, Hercules Hernandez, Kamala and, in his biggest feud of the year, Paul Orndorff. A storyline was developed focusing on the friendship between Hogan and Orndorff with Adrian Adonis eventually starting trouble between the two, causing Orndorff to turn against Hogan. Bundy, meanwhile, would team with Big John Studd on occasion (and begin his feud with The Machines). He would also challenge Hogan on-and-off for the World Heavyweight Championship during the next year and a half, until leaving the WWF in early 1988.

Following his battle royal win, André the Giant's career was at a crossroads. Not yet evident to fans, André was beginning to suffer the health effects of his terminal illness known as acromegaly, a syndrome resulting from an excessive production of growth hormone that led to his gigantic size. Because of his health, as well as accepting a starring role in the movie The Princess Bride, André took a brief hiatus from the ring. To explain his absence, a storyline was devised to have André no-show for a tag team match pitting him and a partner of his choosing against long-time rivals Big John Studd and King Kong Bundy. André would then be suspended at the insistence of manager Bobby Heenan. André would return but compete under a mask as part of a new team called The Machines. Studd and Bundy insisted—but were never able to prove—that André and "The Giant Machine" were the same person.

WrestleMania 2 marked the last major pay-per-view appearance for Roddy Piper during his initial heel run. Shortly before the event, he taped four weeks worth of Piper's Pit segments that would air on the WWF's syndicated programs in April, and then took a four-month hiatus from the ring. When Piper returned to the WWF in August, he became a face and began a violent feud with Adrian Adonis, who had in the meantime started his own Piper's Pit-type talk show called The Flower Shop. Jesse "the Body" Ventura also took a leave of absence after WrestleMania 2; like Piper, he filmed several weeks worth of his talk show segment, The Body Shop, to air in the coming weeks. Afterward, The Magnificent Muraco would be the fill-in host of the segment until the final installment, aired August 30, 1986. In late August, Ventura returned for television tapings of the first WWF Superstars of Wrestling, continuing his role as a heel-favoring color commentator.

WrestleMania 2 was seen as a financial success from a pay-per-view purchase standpoint, earning an estimated $5 million, leading Cable Television Business Magazine to compliment the event stating "If anything, we learned from (WrestleMania), it's that the right promotion makes an event successful". The magazine also described how Cablevision saw an increase in 5,300 subscribers the week of the pay-per-view alone compared to new subscriber numbers on average of 300 to 400 while stating it was the third-most purchased pay-per-view event ever to that point. WrestleMania 2 would air in reruns on Showtime in July 1986 even after some of the storylines that were started at the event had concluded.

== Home media and streaming ==
The event was released on VHS by Coliseum Video in the United States and in 1991 by Silver Vision in the United Kingdom. The home video includes a specially filmed introduction to the event from Gene Okerlund and cuts Uncle Elmer's entrance to the ring, likely due to copyright issues with his entrance music.

In May 2004, it was re-released on DVD in the United Kingdom as part of Silver Vision's Tagged Classics range, and was paired with WrestleMania I. This DVD set was not released in the USA.

In 2014, the event was included on the WWE's streaming platform the WWE Network as part of its launch and remained on the service until the platform closed in 2026.As of October 2026, subscribers in multiple territories, including the US, Canada and the UK, can stream the event on Netflix, thanks to the WWE's ten-year agreement with the company.

In 2025, WWE uploaded the battle royal and the main event to stream freely on their WWE Vault YouTube channel.

== Results ==
Nassau Coliseum
No.	Results	Stipulations	Times
1	Paul Orndorff vs. Magnificent Muraco (with Mr. Fuji) ended in a double countout	Singles match	4:10
2	Randy Savage (c) (with Miss Elizabeth) defeated George Steele	Singles match for the WWF Intercontinental Championship	5:10
3	Jake Roberts defeated George Wells	Singles match	3:15
4	Mr. T (with Joe Frazier and Haiti Kid) defeated Roddy Piper (with Lou Duva and Bob Orton) by disqualification	Boxing match (scheduled for 10, 3 minute long rounds, referee: Jack Lotz, judges: Cab Calloway, Darryl Dawkins, and G. Gordon Liddy)	13:14 (match ended in 4th round)
(c) / – the champion(s) heading into the match

Rosemont Horizon
No.	Results	Stipulations	Times
1	The Fabulous Moolah (c) defeated Velvet McIntyre	Singles match for the WWF Women's Championship	1:25
2	Corporal Kirchner defeated Nikolai Volkoff (with Freddie Blassie)	Flag match	2:05
3	André the Giant won by last eliminating Bret Hart	WWF vs. NFL Battle Royal (Note: Order of elimination: Jimbo Covert (NFL player - Chicago Bears), King Tonga, Ernie Holmes (Former NFL player - Pittsburgh Steelers), Jim Brunzell, Tony Atlas, Pedro Morales, Harvey Martin (Former NFL player - Dallas Cowboys), Ted Arcidi, Danny Spivey, Hillbilly Jim, B. Brian Blair, Bill Fralic (NFL player - Atlanta Falcons), The Iron Sheik, Bruno Sammartino, William Perry (NFL player - Chicago Bears), Big John Studd, Russ Francis (NFL player - San Francisco 49ers), Jim Neidhart, and Bret Hart.)	9:13
4	The British Bulldogs (Davey Boy Smith and Dynamite Kid) (with Lou Albano and Ozzy Osbourne) defeated the Dream Team (Brutus Beefcake and Greg Valentine) (c) (with Johnny Valiant)	Tag team match for the WWF Tag Team Championship	13:03
(c) / – the champion(s) heading into the match

Los Angeles Memorial Sports Arena
No.	Results	Stipulations	Times
1	Ricky Steamboat defeated Hercules Hernandez	Singles match	7:27
2	Adrian Adonis (with Jimmy Hart) defeated Uncle Elmer	Singles match	3:01
3	Hoss Funk and Terry Funk (with Jimmy Hart) defeated Tito Santana and Junkyard Dog	Tag team match	11:42
4	Hulk Hogan (c) defeated King Kong Bundy (with Bobby Heenan)	Steel cage match for the WWF World Heavyweight Championship	11:00
(c) / – the champion(s) heading into the match
