= WWF Prime Time Wrestling =

Professional wrestling television program

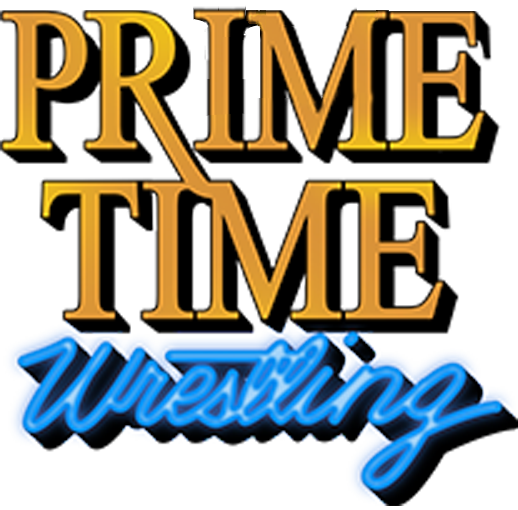
- Genre: Professional wrestling
- Created by: Vince McMahon
- Country of origin: United States
- Original language: English
- No. of episodes: 401

Production
- Camera setup: Multi-camera setup
- Running time: 120 minutes (inc. commercials)
- Production company: World Wrestling Federation

Original release
- Network: USA Network
- Release: January 1, 1985 – January 4, 1993

Related
- WWE Raw (1993–present)

WWF Prime Time Wrestling, or simply Prime Time Wrestling, is a professional wrestling television program that was produced by the World Wrestling Federation (WWF). It aired on the USA Network from January 1, 1985, to January 4, 1993, when it was replaced on its slot by the live arena program Monday Night Raw.

Prime Time Wrestling was a two-hour long, weekly program that featured stars of the World Wrestling Federation. The program featured wrestling matches (most of which were compiled from WWF "house show" matches from venues such as Madison Square Garden), interviews, promos featuring WWF wrestlers, updates of current feuds and announcements of upcoming local and pay-per-view events. In addition, Prime Time Wrestling would also air wrestling matches and interviews from other WWF programming such as Superstars of Wrestling and Wrestling Challenge. Select episodes of Prime Time Wrestling were available for streaming on the WWE Network prior to its closure.

== Main focus ==
Despite the format changes in its last years, the main focus of Prime Time Wrestling remained unchanged—recapping the highlights of the WWF's flagship syndicated programs and presenting exclusive matches taped from the house show circuit. Many of these were main event caliber and mid-card matches seldom seen on the syndicated programs, which tended to show primarily squash matches. Many wrestlers’ first WWF television appearances were also on this show. Selected matches from the past and present from WWF's flagship arenas of the time — Madison Square Garden in New York City, the Spectrum in Philadelphia the Boston Garden in Boston, and the Capital Centre in the Washington suburb of Landover, Maryland — that had aired on various regional sports networks were also aired on Prime Time Wrestling.

== History ==
=== Early years ===
Premiering on January 1, 1985, the original hosts of Prime Time Wrestling were Jesse Ventura and Jack Reynolds. Reynolds would co-host his final edition of Prime Time on July 9, 1985, with Gorilla Monsoon replacing him as Ventura's co-host the week after.

Bobby Heenan made his first appearance as Monsoon's co-host on April 28, 1986, and officially replaced Ventura on June 30 of that same year.

The best-remembered Prime Time format featured Heenan and Monsoon introducing taped matches and analyzing them afterward, with Monsoon taking a babyface and sometimes neutral position and Heenan unashamedly cheering on the heels, especially members of The Heenan Family. The chemistry between Monsoon and Heenan made this show popular with fans for many years, despite the fact it was not considered one of the WWF's "primary" shows for most of its history. Many other wrestling programs—both produced by the WWF and by other companies—would attempt to copy this formula, with varying degrees of success.

Although primarily a studio-based program, Prime Time would occasionally go on the road and tape its segments from various outside locations. Examples included Busch Gardens, Trump Plaza, the CN Tower, and Churchill Downs, among others. These segments rarely had much to do with the actual wrestling content of the program, and were played primarily for the comic interaction between Monsoon and Heenan.

Heenan and Monsoon co-hosted Prime Time from 1986–1991. Roddy Piper replaced Heenan briefly in the summer of 1989, during the period Heenan "took over" the last half-hour of the Prime Time program for his own talk show; after Heenan returned to the main program, Piper was retained for the remainder of 1989 as a second co-host. Piper's final episode was the Christmas 1989 episode, where he attacked Heenan for dressing like Santa and badmouthing the Christmas season and insulting kids. The Rosati Sisters, a group of overweight sisters who were fans of the WWF, were frequent guests on the show from 1989 to 1990, also serving as assistants to Heenan on his show.

At times, guests have appeared on the studio set for cameo appearances or to sub-host for someone. Gene Okerlund was the most frequent guest, sometimes stopping by on the set for no reason other than to antagonize Heenan. Okerlund also was a substitute host for the series whenever Monsoon or Heenan were away; Vince McMahon was also a substitute host when Monsoon fell ill in early 1988. Tony Schiavone also guest hosted an episode of the series along with Sean Mooney, with the explanation being that Monsoon and Heenan were at the Trump Plaza for Wrestlemania V. Also notably, Freddie Blassie made an appearance in late 1989, antagonizing Heenan for owing him money and turning face in the process. For the rest of the episode, he remained as a special guest co-host alongside Piper in Piper's studio. The Red Rooster and The Brooklyn Brawler also appeared as guests in 1989 for the purpose of an angle where Lombardi knocked out Monsoon with a chair and beat up The Rooster, who had just fired Heenan as his manager. Rick Rude also guested in the summer of 1989 mostly to further his feud with Piper. Arnold Skaaland, Hillbilly Jim, Ted DiBiase, Koko B. Ware, Mr. Fuji, Demolition, Lord Alfred Hayes and Harley Race also stopped in the studio as guests during the run of the series.

=== Format changes ===
==== February 18, 1991–November 4, 1991 ====
On February 18, 1991, Prime Time changed formats to something vaguely resembling a talk/variety show, with an in-studio audience. Vince McMahon and Bobby Heenan hosted this version of Prime Time, with Lord Alfred Hayes serving as an announcer. WWF wrestlers were frequent guests during this particular incarnation of Prime Time, which was similar to the WWF's old Tuesday Night Titans program. McMahon's last appearance as a co-host was the June 10, 1991, episode. In the weeks that followed, Gene Okerlund, Sean Mooney, and Gorilla Monsoon all filled in for McMahon as co-hosts. On the July 15, 1991, episode, Mooney became the official co-host of Prime Time alongside Heenan. The duo would remain the show's co-hosts until this format was discontinued after the November 4, 1991, episode.

==== November 11, 1991–January 4, 1993 ====
Due to poor ratings with the audience format, Prime Time's final format debuted on November 11, 1991, and featured a panel of WWF personalities (including, at various points, Bobby Heenan, Gorilla Monsoon, Jim Duggan, Randy Savage, Mr. Perfect, Jerry Lawler, Slick, Sgt. Slaughter, and Hillbilly Jim) participating in a roundtable discussion about the goings-on in the WWF. Vince McMahon served as host and moderator for the panel. This format appears to have been inspired by the WTTW series The McLaughlin Group, which was growing in popularity at this time.

The final episode of Prime Time Wrestling aired on January 4, 1993. Monday Night Raw replaced the show in its timeslot the following week.

== Hosts ==
=== Regular main hosts ===
- Jack Reynolds (1985)
- Jesse Ventura (1985–1986)
- Gorilla Monsoon (1985–1993)
- Bobby Heenan (1986–1993)
- Roddy Piper (1989, 1991)
- Vince McMahon (1988, 1991–1993)
- Sean Mooney (1991, various guest appearances afterwards)
- Jim Duggan (1991–1992)
- Slick (1991–1992)
- Mr. Perfect (1991–1992)
- Jerry Lawler (1992)
- Hillbilly Jim (1991–1992)
- Sgt. Slaughter (1991–1992)

=== Guest hosts ===
- Lord Alfred Hayes (1985–1991)
- Jimmy Hart (1986)
- Ted DiBiase (1987)
- Randy Savage (1988, 1992)
- Gene Okerlund (1989–92)
- Tony Schiavone (1989)
- Freddie Blassie (1989)
- Brother Love (1989)
- Rick Rude (1989)
- Jake Roberts (1991)
- Earthquake (1991)
- André the Giant (1991)
- The Undertaker (1992)
- Paul Bearer (1992)
- Terry Taylor (1989)
