= Dick Kroll =

American professional wrestling referee (born 1932)

Richard Kroll (born 1932) is an American retired professional wrestling referee.

== Career ==
Kroll was primarily active with the WWF (now WWE) in the 1970s and 1980s. He was prominently featured on WWF on MSG Network. He was the referee in the legendary main event of "Showdown At Shea 1972" between Pedro Morales and Bruno Sammartino.

He also refereed during the first WrestleMania in 1985, and the following years WrestleMania II. He retired during the 1990s, however Paul Heyman persuaded him to work on an ECW card in 1999.
