= Sean Mooney =

American news anchor and wrestling announcer (born 1959)

Sean Edmund Mooney (born May 21, 1959) is an American news anchor and former World Wrestling Federation (WWF, now WWE) play-by-play announcer. He now works as an anchor for KVOA, the NBC affiliate in Tucson, Arizona and the National Wrestling Alliance. He was born in Rochester, New York.

== WWF career ==
Mooney debuted on the May 15, 1988 edition of WWF Wrestling Challenge, replacing announcer Craig DeGeorge.

During his time in the WWF, Mooney's primary duties included play-by-play announcing for matches aired on Prime Time Wrestling, WWF Mania, WWF All-American Wrestling, as host of Coliseum Video releases (where he also provided commentary for "exclusive" matches), and hosting the "Events Center" segment during the WWF's syndicated TV shows, such as WWF Superstars and WWF Wrestling Challenge. The "Event Center" was a segment used to promote feuds and house shows. During a moment where Earthquake squashed Jake Roberts’ pet snake Damian, cuts were made to Mooney in the "Event Center" to censor out the moments of impact. Mooney made his pay-per-view debut at the first SummerSlam in August 1988 as an interviewer.

On occasion, Mooney portrayed his fictional siblings, an identical twin sister named Betty on Prime Time Wrestling (alongside heel wrestlers including Sensational Sherri) and identical twin brother Ian Mooney while co-hosting Wrestling Spotlight. Mooney's last major appearances were at the 1992 Survivor Series and early episodes of WWF Monday Night Raw, with his actual last appearance on WWF TV promoting the Wrestlemania IX encore presentation on the April 12th edition of Monday Night Raw. In April 1993, his contract expired and he opted not to renew it. He was replaced by Todd Pettengill as an interviewer and Event Center personality and by Gorilla Monsoon on WWF Mania and WWF All-American Wrestling for play-by-play.

=== Later appearances ===
He reappeared on WWE TV in October 2005, during the pre-show to WWE Raw's "Homecoming" to the USA Network. The pre-show simply ran through some past moments of RAW on the USA Network, with several people involved with the WWE during the first years of Monday Night Raw, including Mooney, sharing their memories of the WWE during that period.

Mooney once again returned to WWE on July 23, 2012, for the 1,000th episode of Raw by interviewing Daniel Bryan backstage.

Mooney returned again on the “Old School” edition of The Edge and Christian Show That Totally Reeks of Awesomeness and later in a 2017 DVD release called WWE Unreleased 1986–1995 co-hosting with Charly Caruso. Mooney also appeared on the Top 25 Raw moments celebration which was shown on the WWE Network on January 15, 2018.

== Pre and post-WWF career ==
Mooney worked as an on-camera host and producer for Major League Baseball Productions in the early 1980s before working for the WWF. In 1994, he became an anchorman for WWOR-TV, based in Secaucus, New Jersey. He worked there until 1997, when he was replaced by Ernie Anastos. He moved that year to WBZ in Boston where he served as anchorman for just under a year.

Mooney has been a reporter with Fox Sports Arizona since July 2000 focusing on University of Arizona football and basketball. In 2010, he presented Fox Sports coverage of Rugby around the world and the Rugbyville USA camp in Glendale, Colorado.

He was hired by KVOA TV in 2012 to become a weekend news anchor for News 4 Tucson. In July 2021, Mooney became the primary evening news anchor for the station.

He also hosts a podcast on the MLW Radio Network called Prime Time with Sean Mooney, which was co-hosted by former WWE wrestler "Hacksaw" Jim Duggan for its first 18 episodes.

On July 13, 2018, it was announced Mooney would commentate the ALL IN broadcast with Don Callis, Ian Riccaboni, Excalibur, Alicia Atout, Justin Roberts, and Bobby Cruise.

On January 27, 2020, it was announced that Mooney would be joining the National Wrestling Alliance (NWA) broadcast team. He debuted on the January 28 episode of NWA Powerrr interviewing Nick Aldis.
