= WWF Wrestling Challenge =

Professional wrestling television show

- Genre: Professional wrestling
- Created by: Vince McMahon
- Country of origin: United States

Production
- Running time: 60 minutes (inc. commercials)
- Production company: World Wrestling Federation

Original release
- Network: Syndicated
- Release: September 6, 1986 – 1996

Related
- All-Star Wrestling (1971–1986)

WWF Wrestling Challenge, or simply Wrestling Challenge, is a professional wrestling television show that was produced by the World Wrestling Federation (WWF, now known as WWE). It was syndicated weekly and aired from 1986 to 1996. Near the end of the program's run, its name was shortened to WWF Challenge.

The show featured matches, pre-match interviews, and occasionally, summarized weekly events in WWF programming. Matches primarily saw top-tier and mid-level talent vs. Jobbers. At times, there was a "feature" match between main WWF talent. As with other syndicated WWF programming, the show promoted WWF event dates and house shows in local media markets. It was the 'B' show of WWF syndication, meaning it generally only aired in markets where WWF had two weekly slots, with the other taken up by WWF Superstars of Wrestling.

== History ==
Wrestling Challenge premiered on September 6, 1986, replacing All-Star Wrestling.

Following the show's debut, The Snake Pit, hosted by Jake "The Snake" Roberts, debuted as a feature of the show. The Snake Pit was an in-ring interview segment modeled after Roddy Piper's Piper's Pit, which aired on WWF Superstars of Wrestling. Wrestling Challenge also featured the similarly formatted The Brother Love Show. This segment, which debuted in 1988, was later moved to Superstars of Wrestling. After this, the main feature was a podium interview featuring Gene Okerlund and a random WWF superstar until 1991. Starting in 1991, The Barber Shop debuted with host Brutus "The Barber" Beefcake, while The King's Court, hosted by Jerry Lawler debuted in 1993.

=== Title changes ===
While WWF Superstars of Wrestling held most title changes on national television, Wrestling Challenge only had one title change on November 1, 1992 (taped October 13, 1992), as Money Inc. defeated The Natural Disasters to win the WWF World Tag Team Championship, with interference from The Headshrinkers. This title change was also aired on the October 31, 1992 Superstars of Wrestling with Wrestling Challenge commentators Gorilla Monsoon and Bobby "The Brain" Heenan calling the action. The WWF treated the match as a simulcast on both programs.

=== Commentators ===
The hosts for the first three episodes were Gorilla Monsoon, Ernie Ladd, and Luscious Johnny V. After that, Ladd was replaced by Bobby "The Brain" Heenan while Johnny V continued to do commentary solely for matches where Heenan was managing, until Valiant would leave the WWF in late 1987.

Other hosts included:

- Gorilla Monsoon and Lord Alfred Hayes, UK Challenge (1987-1988)
- Vince McMahon and Bobby Heenan (February 7, 1988)
- Gorilla Monsoon, Tony Schiavone, and Bobby Heenan (June 25, 1989)
- Gorilla Monsoon and Tony Schiavone (July 2, 1989 - November 12, 1989, December 10, 1989 - April 1, 1990)
- Vince McMahon and Gorilla Monsoon (November 19, 26, December 3, 1989)
- Gorilla Monsoon, Bobby Heenan, and Jim "The Anvil" Neidhart (March 31, 1991 - August 25, 1991)
- Gorilla Monsoon and Bobby Heenan (September 28, 1986 - June 18, 1989, April 22, 1990 - March 24, 1991, September 1, 1991 - April 4, 1993)
- Jim Ross and Bobby Heenan (April 11, 1993 - December 5, 1993)
- Jim Ross and Gorilla Monsoon (December 12, 1993 - February 13, 1994)
- Gorilla Monsoon and Stan Lane (February 13, 1994 - March 20, 1994)
- Stan Lane and Ted DiBiase (March 27, 1994 - July 3, 1994, July 10, 1994 - August 7, 1994, February 26, 1995)
- Jim Ross and Ted DiBiase (August 14, 1994 - August 28, 1994)
- Gorilla Monsoon and Ted DiBiase (July 10, 1994, September 4, 1994 - February 19, 1995, March 5, 1995 - April 23, 1995)
- Jim Ross and Gorilla Monsoon (April 30, 1995 - June 11, 1995, June 25, 1995 - July 30, 1995)
- Stan Lane and Gorilla Monsoon (June 18, 1995)
- Jim Ross and Dok Hendrix (August 6, 1995 - August 27, 1995)
- Dok Hendrix and Mr. Perfect (August 27, 1995 onward)

== International transmission ==
In some parts of Canada, Wrestling Challenge was repackaged as WWF Cavalcade, with the only difference apart from the title being Canadian-produced interview segments. This repackaging allowed the program to count as Canadian content.

In the United Kingdom, the show aired on Sky 1 and a repackaged version was aired occasionally from 1987 until 1988 on ITV as a part of the final two years of ITV's Saturday lunchtime Wrestling coverage. Certain ITV areas also screened a batch of 10 months' worth of episodes (covering the period August 1987-June 1988) in an early morning graveyard timeslot, erroneously announced in TV listings as Superstars Of Wrestling. The late night ITV slot would be replaced in 1990 by tapes of WCW. The Sky transmission continued to air in the UK until 1997, when it was repackaged as WWF Shotgun Challenge.

== Home media ==
Select episodes of Wrestling Challenge are available for streaming on the WWE Network. As of May 17, 2021, there were 23 episodes of Wrestling Challenge available for streaming on WWE Network, dating from its premiere to February 8, 1987.
