= Lord Alfred Hayes =

British professional wrestler (1928–2005)

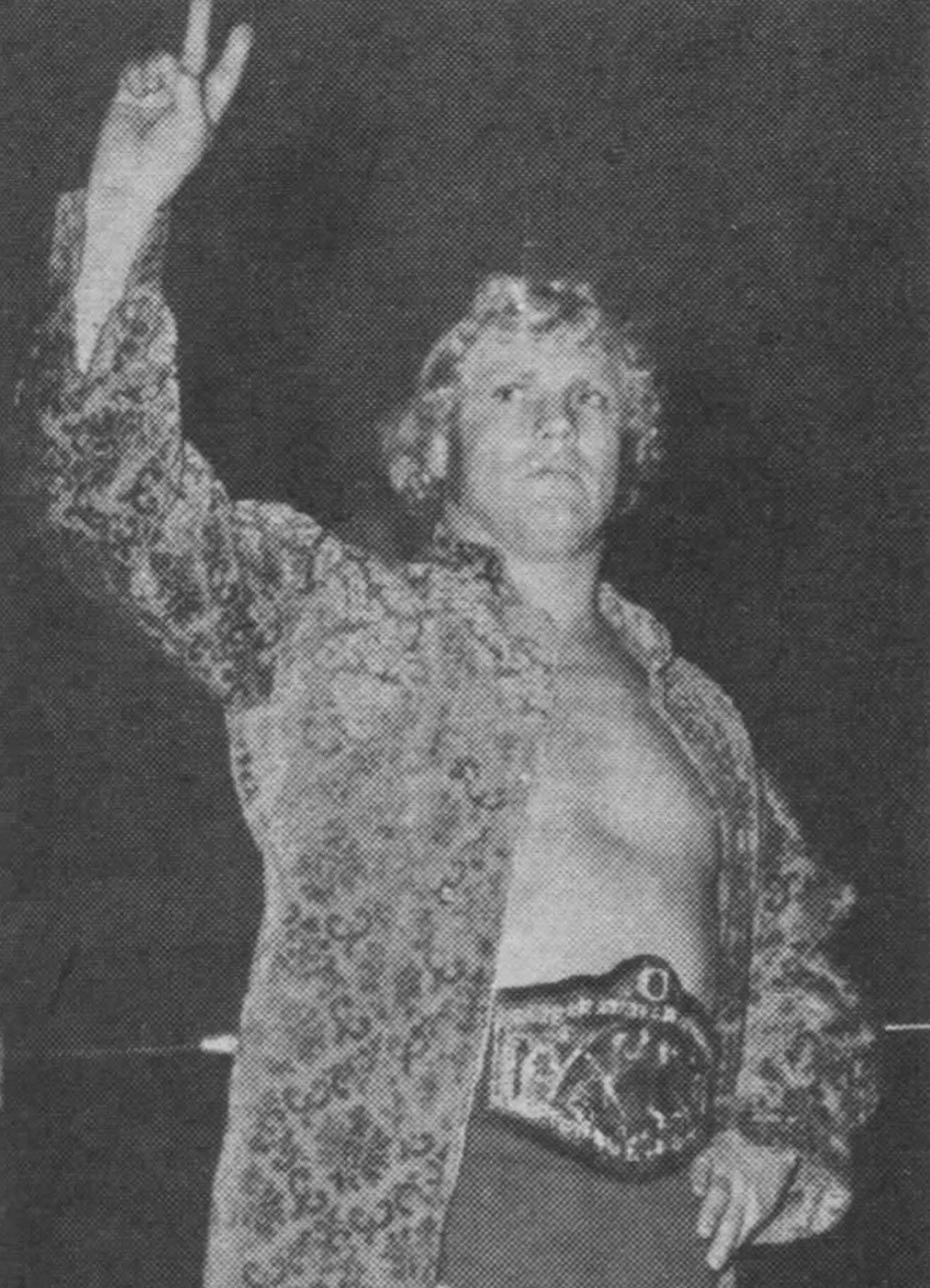
- Hayes in 1973
- Born: Alfred George James Hayes; 8 August 1928; London, England
- Died: 21 July 2005 (aged 76); Dallas, Texas, U.S.
- Education: University of North London
- Occupations: Professional wrestler, wrestling manager, color commentator
- Professional wrestling career
- Ring name(s): Judo Al Hayes; Al Hayes; Lord Alfred Hayes; The White Angel
- Billed height: 5 ft 9 in (175 cm)
- Billed weight: 238 lb (108 kg)
- Billed from: Windermere, England
- Trained by: Sir Atholl Oakeley, Bt
- Debut: 1950
- Retired: 1983

Alfred George James Hayes (8 August 1928 – 21 July 2005) was an English professional wrestler, manager and commentator, best known for his appearances in the United States with the World Wrestling Federation between 1982 and 1995 where he was known as Lord Alfred Hayes. Hayes was distinguished by his "Masterpiece Theatre diction" and "Oxford accent".

== Early life ==
Born in London, Hayes attended the North-Western Polytechnic, which was evacuated to Luton Modern School during World War II. He attained a black belt in judo before training as a wrestler under Sir Atholl Oakeley, Bt.

== Professional wrestling career ==
=== British and French Wrestling (1950s-1970s) ===
Wrestling as "Judo" Al Hayes, he appeared on the British circuit from the late 1950s to the late 1960s, when he left the United Kingdom and traveled to the United States. He also wrestled in France for the FFCP and appeared on televised wrestling matches on RTF, on which commentator Roger Couderc claimed that Hayes and regular tag team partner "Rebel" Ray Hunter were Australians. He was a blue-eye who battled all of the heavyweight heels of his time, and held the Southern Area Heavyweight Championship for a number of years. He traded heavily on his judo background, and specialised with judo chops and nerve holds. His most famous period was when he fought for Paul Lincoln Promotions as The White Angel, with a massive feud against black-masked heel Dr Death. Death eventually won, and unmasked Hayes. The feud was inspired by a similar feud in France pitting L'Ange Blanc against Le Bourreau de Bethune. Hayes would later make a homecoming tour of the United Kingdom, including televised matches. During these bouts, he remained a heel and fought his way through most of his former tag partners. It was explained that Hayes had inherited the dreaded "American style" in his adopted country. His in-ring fame was epitomised by a front-cover sleeve on the TV Times.

His popularity also meant he was able to adapt to political office, being a Conservative councillor for the Labour stronghold of Islington.

=== Various North American promotions (1970s–1980s) ===
Hayes later went to wrestle in America. In 1972, he defeated Dory Funk Jr. for the NWA World Heavyweight Championship but the decision was changed when Funk's father Dory Funk Sr. attacked the referee after the match. In a fit of anger, the official disqualified Funk Jr., thus inadvertently returning the title to the champion. Hayes also wrestled in brief stints for his future employer the WWWF, battling Bruno Sammartino for the World Heavyweight Championship on occasion.

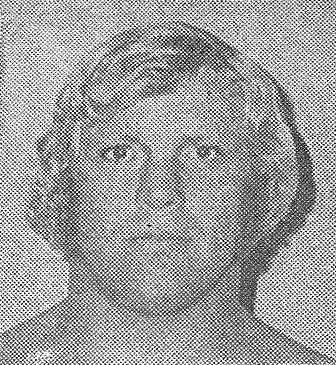
Hayes in 1975

While wrestling for Sam Muchnick in St. Louis during the mid-1970s, Hayes turned heel and adopted the gimmick of the aristocratic "Lord Alfred" Hayes. Hayes adopted the role as a manager after he had decided wrestling was taking a toll on his knees. As this character, Hayes later became a manager in the AWA, Florida and later Montreal, managing fellow Brit Billy Robinson, Baron von Raschke, Jimmy Valiant (whom he rebranded as "King James" Valiant) and the Super Destroyers. He became notorious for delivering TV interviews in a sneering aristocratic English accent, often sipping cups of tea and wearing a bow tie and frilly shirt.

Hayes reverted to babyface and began a feud with fellow manager Bobby Heenan after an incident in November 1979 where Super Destroyer II fired Hayes and replaced him with Heenan. He also had his first stint as a commentator - taking a fairly benign neutral position not dissimilar to his later WWF work - in Jim Crockett Promotions in the Mid Atlantic around 1981. In other territories however, Hayes remained a heel. In Florida in 1980, Hayes began managing Bobby Jaggers while his regular manager Oliver Humperdink was busy acting as Dusty Rhodes' servant for thirty days (after another protege of his, Ivan Koloff lost a match to Rhodes with that stipulation.) When "Rooster" Humperdink, who had become a figure of sympathy during his thirty days' servitude, returned to management and attempted to claim back Jaggers, Hayes and another protege Nikolai Volkoff brutally beat on Humperdink, thus starting a feud with Humperdink and Rhodes.

Hayes later worked again as a heel manager for Robinson in Lutte Internationale in the early 1980s during Robinson's reign with the Canadian International Heavyweight Championship. Hayes also managed Masked Superstar, around this time.

His last match was a loss to Chris Adams in a judo match on 6 June 1983 in Texas.

=== World Wrestling Federation (1982–1995) ===
Hayes joined the World Wrestling Federation in 1982. He started as a road agent but then started doing television for McMahon as well, starting work as an interviewer during the 26 December 1983 edition of wrestling at Madison Square Garden. He was a sidekick to Vince McMahon on Tuesday Night Titans, a WWF-style talk show from 1984 to 1986. Hayes became familiar to WWF viewers as a light-spoken Englishman (using a softer accent than during his period as a heel manager) with an uproarious laugh. On TNT, Hayes usually was the victim of several slapsticks; some instances included getting a face-full of powder, being slopped with pumpkin-innards by "Captain" Lou Albano, drinking one of Hulk Hogan's diet shakes, then promptly vomiting, being nearly bitten by one of Hillbilly Jim's goats, and getting slapped in the face by "Rowdy" Roddy Piper. He would later become the introductory announcer on Prime Time Wrestling, on which he would give rousing and complimentary introductions to the face hosts and slightly less flattering but coolly worded intros to Bobby "The Brain" Heenan. He was once "taken hostage" from the show by Sgt. Slaughter and his "Iraqi" allies.

Hayes appeared at WrestleMania in 1985 where he was the backstage commentator introducing matches and pre-recorded comments by the wrestlers. As Hayes was announcing the upcoming WWF Women's Championship match to the TV audience, he was affectionately kissed on the cheek by his real life friend The Fabulous Moolah as she and her charge, WWF Women's Champion Leilani Kai walked to the ring for Kai's title defence against Wendi Richter (Kai also kissed a visibly blushing Hayes). Moolah would also kiss Hayes full on the lips during an episode of Tuesday Night Titans. At WrestleMania 2, he served as commentator alongside Jesse "The Body" Ventura and the "Mistress of the Dark" Elvira for the Los Angeles portion of the event. This was the only WWF pay-per-view on which Hayes commentated on the main event (Hulk Hogan vs King Kong Bundy in a steel cage for Hogan's WWF World Heavyweight Championship belt). For the Coliseum Video release of WrestleMania III, Hayes briefly appeared alongside Gorilla Monsoon hyping the event. In 1986, Hayes served as ring announcer for early tapings of WWF Wrestling Challenge.

Hayes in the WWF

As the WWF's video library began to expand, Hayes became a mainstay in many of the releases; such as "Etiquette With Lord Alfred Hayes", a short segment on the WWF World Tour 1991 tape, where he attempted to teach table manners to Sensational Sherri and The Brooklyn Brawler. Another segment on the tape collections took place on the "Supertape" series when Lord Alfred Hayes would voice "The Call of the Action" in which a match or two would be slowed down and each manoeuvre named and explained (for instance, the audience could learn what a reverse crescent kick was, long before it became more famously known as "Sweet Chin Music"). It was also an example of how as late as 1990 or so, professional wrestling was still presented with "Kayfabe", the veneer of reality. He later appeared on the video releases of WrestleMania VII where he had a corny Love Story-like part regarding the reunion of "Macho Man" Randy Savage and his former manager Miss Elizabeth following Savage's career-ending loss to Ultimate Warrior, WrestleMania VIII, and Royal Rumble 1993 where he famously asked to watch Sensational Sherri put on her stockings while interviewing her in her dressing room, prompting Sherri to mockingly call him a "dirty old man". He also appeared on some early episodes of Monday Night RAW. Wrestlemania VII also saw the last Wrestlemania match called by Hayes when he joined Monsoon in calling the Intercontinental Championship match between champion Mr Perfect and challenger the Big Boss Man. This was due to Monsoon's co-commentator for the event Bobby Heenan being Perfect's manager at the time and he was required to be at ringside.

Hayes was the color commentator for Bret Hart's win over Ric Flair at a house show in Saskatoon, Saskatchewan that earned him his first WWF Championship, which was released as a Coliseum Video home exclusive. Lord Alfred also appeared on many episodes of Saturday Night's Main Event, often performing silly recorded acts with fellow WWF commentator/interviewer "Mean" Gene Okerlund. One skit involved Hayes and Okerlund (referred to as "Jim" by Hayes despite Okerlund protesting his name was "Gene") taking a safari through Africa, encountering many strange sights along the way (Akeem "The African Dream" and his manager Slick, Koko B. Ware and his parrot "Frankie", The Bushwhackers, and Jake "The Snake" Roberts and his pet python "Damien").

Hayes is known for having spoken the phrase "Promotional consideration paid for by the following", which was heard at the end of Superstars of Wrestling and Wrestling Challenge syndicated shows. At WrestleMania fan access, fans would ask him to repeat his line.

As a commentator, Hayes maintained his reserved mannerisms; though not specifically a heel, he would be quicker to give praise to heelish characters, though disapproving of underhanded methods (in one match, after being told by Gorilla Monsoon that the Hart Foundation had "broken every rule in the book," he replied with a conceding "yes, they've done that"). He was jokingly referred to by Hulk Hogan as "Awful Alfred" during interviews. It was during this time that his hearty uproarious laugh would become his trademark, bursting into laughter after a witty comment by his regular broadcast partner Gorilla Monsoon. He would quietly absorb criticism and insults from heel commentators such as Heenan and The Honky Tonk Man. However, toward the end of his WWF run he quietly shifted to a more heelish style, where he would be quicker to take the sides of heels (such as Owen Hart after he turned on Bret) and quicker to insult the faces (calling Paul Bearer a "little toad"). His final famous WWF promo took place in November 1994, when The Headshrinkers did a promo for "Left Guard Sport stick (a parody of Right Guard Sport Stick)" and Fatu and Sione (The Headshrinkers) ate the deodorant causing Alfred to keep telling them to stop.

Hayes' various roles for the WWF included co-hosting All American Wrestling with Gene Okerlund and doing commentary for shows at Madison Square Garden with Gorilla Monsoon sporadically from 1984 to 1990. Hayes' most common broadcast partner was Sean Mooney, who was paired with Hayes on Prime Time Wrestling, WWF Mania, as well as most all releases for Coliseum Video starting in 1989 until 1993. Hayes and Mooney often participated in comedic skits together, including a Star Trek parody. Hayes was also the announcer for Bobby Heenan's The Bobby Heenan Show, which aired briefly in the Summer of 1989.

Hayes also spoke fluent French (he had cut promos in French back in his time in the Montreal territory) and in 1994, he did French commentary a few times alongside Raymond Rougeau as a fill-in on shows airing in French-speaking countries around the world.

=== American Wrestling Federation (1996) ===
After leaving the WWF, Hayes would later appear as a full-on heel commentator alongside Mick Karch, calling the action in 1996 for the short-lived American Wrestling Federation.

== Retirement, death, and legacy ==
Hayes retired from the WWF in 1995 after enduring a series of pay cuts. McMahon and the rest of the office were reportedly very upset at the news as Hayes was someone that they didn't want to lose. Around this time he was also involved in a serious car accident. As a result of the accident he suffered gangrene and part of a leg had to be amputated. Hayes was a wheelchair user for the remainder of his life. He spent the last few years of his life in a retirement home, only venturing out of the home to make appearances at wrestling conventions sporadically. He later had a series of strokes and died on 21 July 2005 at his home in Texas. He was 76 years old. On the first episode of Monday Night RAW to air after his death, WWE paid tribute to Hayes with a ten-bell salute and a video memorial. On 15 November 2010 "Old School" edition of Raw, his voice-over was a part of the broadcast. Hayes was named to the WWE Hall of Fame as part of the Legacy Wing in 2018.

== Championships and accomplishments ==
- Big Time Wrestling
  - NWA Texas Tag Team Championship (1 time) – with Big O
- Central States Wrestling
  - NWA World Tag Team Championship (Central States version) (2 times) – with Bob Brown (1) and Roger Kirby (1)
- Eastern Sports Association
  - ESA International Tag Team Championship (1 time) – with Mike Dubois
- NWA Western States Sports
  - NWA Western States Heavyweight Championship (5 times)
  - NWA Western States Tag Team Championship (3 times) – with Ricky Romero (1), Ricki Starr (1) and Nick Kozak (1)
- Professional Wrestling Hall of Fame
  - Class of 2014
- Pro Wrestling Illustrated
  - Inspirational Wrestler of the Year (1972)
- WWE
  - WWE Hall of Fame (Class of 2018)
- Other accomplishments
  - Southern Area Heavyweight Championship (1 time)
