= Jack Lotz =

American wrestling referee and actor (1933–2020)

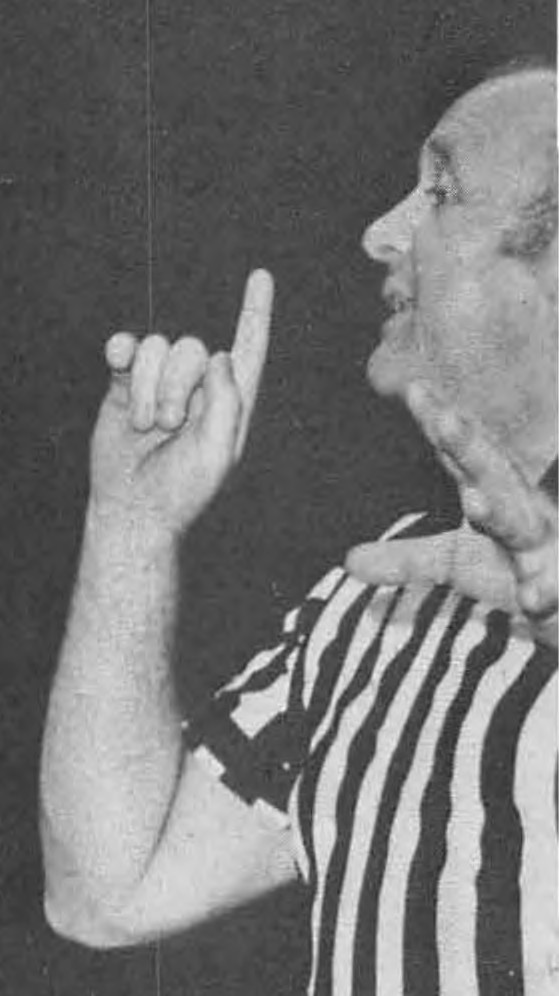
Lotz, circa 1979

John Lotz (August 13, 1933 – April 18, 2020) was an American wrestling referee and actor. Lotz worked predominantly for the World Wrestling Federation (now World Wrestling Entertainment). Lotz officiated at the first three WrestleMania events during the 1980s.

== Biography ==
Born in Yonkers, New York he started his career as an elevator assembly worker and later a truck driver for 'Yonkers Butter and Eggs'. He enlisted in the US Navy and served in the Korean War between 1951 and 1954.

Lotz had a 33-year career as a referee for the New York State Athletic Commission. He was the referee for Bob Backlund's victory over Superstar Billy Graham in 1978 for the WWWF Heavyweight Championship as well as for Hulk Hogan's victory over The Iron Sheik in 1984 for the same championship, then renamed the WWF Heavyweight Championship.

Lotz refereed matches in the first three WrestleMania events, including the boxing match between Rowdy Roddy Piper and Mr. T at WrestleMania 2.

Outside of wrestling, Lotz appeared in the films Raging Bull and The Hurricane as well as the television drama, The Sopranos.

Lotz died on April 18, 2020, due to complications from COVID-19 at the age of 86 in Yonkers, New York, during the COVID-19 pandemic in New York (state).

== Filmography ==
Year	Title	Role	Notes
1980	Raging Bull	Referee - Fox Fight	
1988	Homeboy	Coffee Shop Customer	
1990	The Return of Superfly	Customs Marshal	Uncredited
1994	Nadja	Boxing Coach	
1998	Hell's Kitchen	Johnny's Corner Man	
2001	Love the Hard Way	The John in Bedroom	(final film role)
