= Gorilla Monsoon =

American professional wrestler (1937–1999)

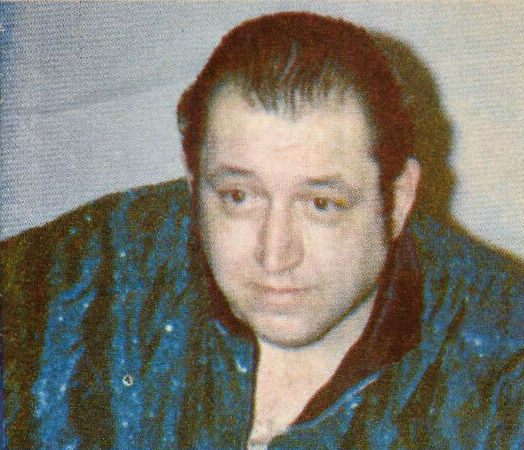
- Monsoon in 1977

Personal information
- Born: Robert James Marella; June 4, 1937 Rochester, New York, U.S.
- Died: October 6, 1999 (aged 62) Willingboro Township, New Jersey, U.S.
- Cause of death: Complications of diabetes
- Education: Ithaca College
- Spouse: Maureen Marella (m. 1959)
- Children: 4, including Joey Marella and Víctor Quiñones

Professional wrestling career
- Ring name(s): Gino Marella; Gorilla Monsoon; Bob Marella; Manchuria Giant
- Billed height: 6 ft 7 in (201 cm)
- Billed weight: 401 lb (182 kg)
- Billed from: Manchuria; Willingboro, New Jersey
- Trained by: Stu Hart
- Debut: 1958
- Retired: 1983

Robert James "Gino" Marella (June 4, 1937 – October 6, 1999), better known by his ring name, Gorilla Monsoon, was an American professional wrestler, play-by-play commentator, and booker.

Monsoon is famous for his run as a villainous super-heavyweight main eventer, and later as the voice of the World Wrestling Federation (WWF), as commentator and backstage manager during the 1980s and 1990s. He also portrayed the on-screen role of WWF President from 1995 to 1997.

In professional wrestling, the staging area just behind the entrance curtain at an event, a position which Marella established and where he could often be found during WWF shows late in his career, is named the "Gorilla Position" in his honor.

== Early life ==
Marella attended Jefferson High School in Rochester, New York, becoming a standout athlete in football, amateur wrestling, and track and field. At the time, he weighed over 300 pounds (136 kg) and was affectionately called "Tiny" by his teammates.

Marella was also a standout athlete after high school at Ithaca College in Ithaca, New York. He continued to wrestle, now weighing over 350 pounds, and took second in the 1959 NCAA Wrestling Championships. He also held several school athletic records, including an 18-second wrestling pin, and several track-and-field distinctions. During the summers he was at Ithaca College, he was a construction worker in Rochester. One of the buildings he helped construct was the Rochester War Memorial Arena.

Marella's size and athletic ability attracted the attention of New York promoter Pedro Martinez, and he went to wrestle for Martinez after graduating from Ithaca in 1959. Gorilla was 6'5" and weighed around 330 pounds when he first started wrestling professionally. By the end of his career, he was up around 375 pounds, although he had weighed as much as 440 pounds at points.

== Professional wrestling career ==
=== Early career ===
Marella debuted in 1958, originally billing himself as Gino Marella, a proud Italian American babyface who would sing in Italian prior to his matches. Even after changing his ring name, "Gino" stuck as Marella's nickname among friends and colleagues, including Jesse Ventura, who would call Marella "Gino" on the air. He would work in Toronto, Calgary, St. Louis and Japan. Marella garnered moderate popularity but soon realized that fans paid more attention to outlandish monster heel gimmicks, and they, therefore, made more money. Marella totally revamped his image, growing a long beard and billing himself as Gorilla Monsoon, a terrifying giant from Manchuria. Supposedly born on an isolated farm, "Monsoon" traveled across the countryside with a gypsy caravan wrestling bears, spoke no English, ate raw meat, and drank his victims' blood. The story given on WWWF television was a bit different: his first manager, Bobby Davis, claimed to have discovered Monsoon in Manchuria wading nude in a mountain stream. The Monsoon character was far more successful, and fans were genuinely afraid of him, sparking a huge financial windfall for Marella. In the ring, Monsoon dominated opponents with vicious chops, the dreaded Manchurian Splash, and his signature move, the Airplane Spin.

=== WWWF (1963–1979) ===
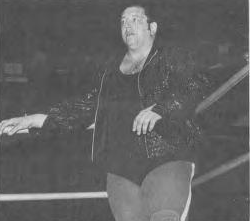
Marella in the ring

In 1963, Vincent J. McMahon reformed the Capitol Wrestling Corporation into the World Wide Wrestling Federation (WWWF) (currently known as World Wrestling Entertainment), breaking his territory away from the National Wrestling Alliance in an attempt to create a new national powerhouse. At the time, the WWWF was the dominant wrestling promotion in the Northeast U.S.. Marella formed a friendship with McMahon, and became a one-sixth shareholder in the WWWF, controlling bookings in several WWWF territories. He also became one of the promotion's top heels, feuding with popular babyface champion Bruno Sammartino in sellout arenas across the country. Despite his huge size, then in excess of 400 pounds, Monsoon had great agility and stamina, often wrestling Sammartino to one-hour time-limit draws.

Monsoon first wrestled Bruno Sammartino for the WWWF World Championship on October 4, 1963, at Roosevelt Stadium, in Jersey City, New Jersey Monsoon qualified by winning a partially televised Ring Wrestling Magazine tournament, where he pinned Killer Buddy Austin in about a minute. Monsoon's disqualification win over Sammartino in NJ triggered a series of rematches at Madison Square Garden, and they would renew the feud again there in 1967. At the end of the Jersey City match, as Monsoon was sitting on the mat, a fan (not part of the show) jumped into the ring and broke the back of a wooden chair over Monsoon's head.

Monsoon teamed up with Killer Kowalski with success. In November 1963, they defeated Skull Murphy and Brute Bernard to win the U.S. Tag Team Championship. The following month, the duo lost the belts to the Tolos Brothers (Chris and John) in Teaneck, New Jersey. Monsoon and Kowalski reunited in the late 1960s to defeat champion Bruno Sammartino and Victor Rivera 2 falls to 1 in Madison Square Garden in a main event, marking the first, and possibly only, time that Sammartino & Rivera lost as a tag team.

Monsoon also teamed with Professor Toru Tanaka in 1967, and they had a number of tag matches in Madison Square Garden. They won a main event on disqualification over Sammartino and Spiros Arion and later lost a Texas Death rematch to the same team. A year later, after defeating teams such as Al Costello & Dr. Bill Miller and Bobo Brazil and Earl Maynard, they went on to lose a main event to Sammartino and Victor Rivera. Monsoon had semi main event matches with Spiros Arion as well as Bobo Brazil in his key heel years.

Also in 1968 he won the IWA World Heavyweight Championship (Australia) defeating Mario Milano on February 2 and dropped the belt to Spiros Arion.

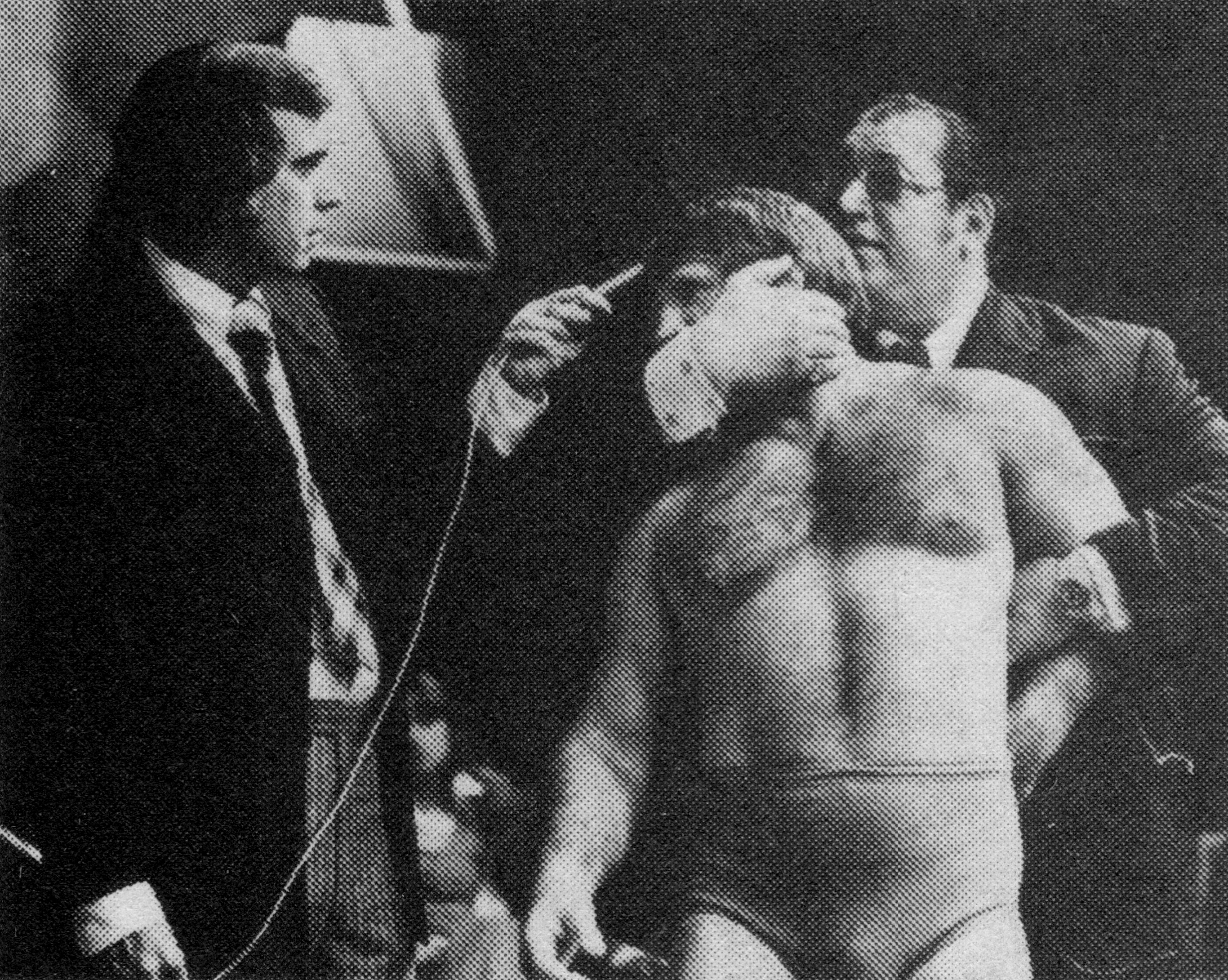
Monsoon and Bruno Sammartino demonstrate holds for Tom Snyder on the November 5, 1975 episode of The Tomorrow Show.

In 1969, Monsoon became a babyface, befriending his former arch-rival when Sammartino rescued him from an attack by "Crazy" Luke Graham, a former tag team partner of Monsoon. The stage was set for Monsoon to become a fan favorite of the 1970s and feud with top heels of the decade, including champion Superstar Billy Graham; he then began to speak English. He turned heel for a short time in 1977 and feuded with André the Giant, and the two engaged in a special boxing match in Puerto Rico (where Monsoon owned stock in the territory), with André winning the match. As a face, he had major wins in Madison Square Garden, including over Killer Kowalski as well as "Big Cat" Ernie Ladd.

On June 1, 1976, a famous incident occurred in Philadelphia involving boxing great Muhammad Ali during a taping for the syndicated WWWF TV show. Ali, preparing for his upcoming crossover bout with Antonio Inoki in Japan later that month, jumped into the ring as Monsoon (who rarely appeared as a wrestler on their TV shows) was concluding a short match against Baron Mikel Scicluna. Ali removed his shirt and started dancing around Monsoon while gesturing and throwing jabs at him, to which Monsoon responded by grabbing Ali in his Airplane Spin and slamming him to the mat. Marella would never reveal whether the incident was preplanned. In an interview, he commented, "I never saw him before and haven't seen him since."

A kind of torch bearer of the Vincent J. McMahon-era WWWF, Gorilla Monsoon was rabidly supported by New York audiences. On June 16, 1980, a young and up-and-coming Hulk Hogan was booked to face him at Madison Square Garden. At the time, Hogan was a widely followed heel character, while Monsoon was still a babyface. However, in order to push the new talent, McMahon told Hulk Hogan to beat Monsoon in a squash match, which lasted barely 3 minutes. Fans were livid and a riot nearly ensued.

=== WWF (1979–1999) ===
In 1979, WWWF was renamed WWF. As the 1980s began, Marella's in-ring career wound down. On August 23, Monsoon put his career on the line in a match against Ken Patera. Monsoon lost and only wrestled a few more matches, retiring several weeks later. Following this he fought only four times: wrestling a six-man tag team match at Madison Square Garden in 1981, a match in 1982 as a substitute for André the Giant where he defeated Swede Hanson, taking part in Big John Studd's "Body Slam Challenge" in 1983, and wrestling at WWC's tenth anniversary show in a loss to Abdullah Tamba in San Juan, Puerto Rico (also in 1983). The next phase of his career began, as the voice and backstage manager of WWF.

In the early 1980s, Vincent J. McMahon's son, Vincent K. McMahon, began assuming the reins of the promotion from his father. The elder McMahon asked his son to take care of long-time employees who had been loyal to him. The younger McMahon agreed, and in 1982, Vince bought Marella's shares in the company in exchange for a guarantee of lifetime employment. As he had been to his father, Marella became a close confidant of the younger McMahon, and assumed a prominent backstage role within the then WWF. Marella would then become an announcer for the WWF starting in 1982. In addition, McMahon needed a new commentary team to head up his television programming, and installed Marella with the recently retired Jesse "The Body" Ventura in 1985.

Marella and Ventura had great chemistry, with Ventura as the pro-heel color commentator and Marella as the pro-face "voice of reason". Marella and Ventura called five of the first six WrestleManias together (the notable exception was WrestleMania 2, where Marella commentated on the Chicago portion of the event with Gene Okerlund, Cathy Lee Crosby and Ernie "The Cat" Ladd while Ventura commentated on the Los Angeles portion with Lord Alfred Hayes and Elvira, Mistress of the Dark).

The Ventura/Monsoon duo of heel and babyface were the original broadcast duo, setting the standard which all who followed would attempt to emulate, especially Ventura's charismatic pro-heel character which was a first of its kind as previous wrestling commentators had almost always been in favor of the fan favorites. The pair commentated on all the WWF pay-per-views together with the exception of the first two SummerSlams and the 1990 Royal Rumble (at SummerSlam 1988 Ventura was the guest referee for the main event so Monsoon commentated with "Superstar" Billy Graham, while Ventura was paired with Tony Schiavone at both SummerSlam 1989 and the Royal Rumble). When Ventura left the WWF in mid-1990, he was replaced in commentary by Monsoon's Prime Time Wrestling co-host, heel manager Bobby "The Brain" Heenan, another duo that subsequent wrestling commentary teams have often tried to emulate. Though the pair were frequently at odds on screen – with Monsoon regularly yelling, "Will you stop?" in response to Heenan's denigration of fan-favorite wrestlers – in real life they formed a close friendship that Heenan often recalled fondly. In his WWE Hall of Fame induction speech at the 2004 ceremony, Heenan finished by saying that only one thing was missing – that he wished Monsoon was there. Other people who were often paired with Monsoon in the broadcast booth included Lord Alfred Hayes, Luscious Johnny Valiant, Johnny Polo, "Superstar" Billy Graham, Hillbilly Jim, Tony Schiavone, Jim Neidhart, Randy Savage and Jim Ross.

Monsoon called the first eight WrestleManias from 1985 to 1992. Monsoon was the lead commentator on the syndicated show, WWF All Star Wrestling, its successor WWF Wrestling Challenge, and the USA Network weekend show, WWF All American Wrestling, as well as hosting the WWF weeknight show, Prime Time Wrestling. Monsoon also served as co-host of Georgia Championship Wrestling on WTBS during McMahon's short-lived ownership of the promotion.

Marella stepped down as the WWF's lead commentator at WrestleMania IX (where he was Master of Ceremonies) to make way for WCW recruit Jim Ross. He was phased out of Wrestling Challenge with Bobby Heenan and was moved to All-American Wrestling with Lord Alfred Hayes on April 11, 1993. He commentated with Jim Ross on WWF Radio for the broadcasts of SummerSlam 1993, Survivor Series 1993 and Royal Rumble 1994. He returned to the television broadcast team to call the King of the Ring 1994 with Randy Savage as well as covering a few episodes of Monday Night RAW in 1993 and 1994 whenever Vince McMahon was unavailable. He was also called upon sporadically to return to Challenge from 1993 to 1995, calling action with Stan Lane, Ted DiBiase, and Ross again. Monsoon also did various work for Coliseum Video. Marella's last pay-per-view commentary was for the 1994 Survivor Series, with Vince McMahon on play-by-play. Marella remained in his backstage role and appeared on-air frequently, becoming the storyline WWF President in the summer of 1995 (replacing Jack Tunney). The WWF President's role was to arbitrate disputes between wrestlers and make matches, similar to later WWE "general managers".

In January 1996, Monsoon was attacked and (kayfabe) severely injured by Vader: Roddy Piper became interim WWF President until WrestleMania XII, when Marella assumed the position again. Health concerns forced him to relinquish this role during the summer of 1997. Instead of naming a replacement, the WWF decided to retire the role of "President" and introduced Sgt. Slaughter as the new WWF Commissioner in August 1997. Marella's health deteriorated from there.

==== Post-retirement ====
In late 1998, Marella returned briefly to call the international version of WWF Superstars. In 1999, Marella appeared in a WWF Attitude commercial featuring Freddie Blassie, Ernie Ladd, Pat Patterson and Killer Kowalski. He appeared as one of three judges for a Brawl for All contest between Bart Gunn and Butterbean at WrestleMania XV. Because of his frail appearance and rapidly declining health, the camera only focused on Monsoon during his introduction as a judge, for which he received a standing ovation. His final occasion on television with WWF would be as a guest commentator on the August 29, 1999, international version of Superstars.

== Personal life and death ==
Marella was married to his wife, Maureen (née Hess, 1939–2025), for more than 40 years and had four children: Sharon (born 1960), Joey (1963–1994), and Valerie (born 1966). Víctor Quiñones (1959–2006) was listed in Gorilla's obituary as his son as well. However, Marella's family denies that Quiñones was a biological child of Marella.

On July 4, 1994, his son, Joey Marella, who worked as a referee for the WWF, fell asleep at the wheel and died in a car accident on the New Jersey Turnpike while returning from refereeing an event in Ocean City, Maryland. He was not wearing a seatbelt at the time of the crash. Fellow WWF employee Mike Chioda later commented that Marella was "heartbroken" about his son's death.

In early 1994, Marella co-hosted the short-lived morning variety/game show Bingo Break on WBFF in Baltimore, Maryland, which also featured fellow WWF on-air personality Sean Mooney as the bingo caller. The program did not acknowledge Marella's wrestling career, and as such he was billed on-camera as Bob Marella rather than as Gorilla Monsoon.

=== Death ===
Marella died on October 6, 1999, of heart failure brought on by complications of diabetes, at his home in Willingboro Township, New Jersey. He was 62 years old. His body was buried next to his son, Joey Marella, at Lakeview Memorial Park in Cinnaminson, New Jersey.

== Tributes and legacy ==
=== Tributes ===
In a tribute that aired on October 7, 1999, on an episode of WWF SmackDown!, McMahon described Marella as "one of the greatest men I have ever known." McMahon was reported to have broken down and cried after recording Marella's tribute. WCW commentator Tony Schiavone acknowledged Marella's death on the October 11, 1999, episode of WCW Monday Nitro. Bobby Heenan insisted on doing a tribute to Marella, even though Marella never worked for WCW. Heenan said on-air: "Gorilla will be sadly missed. Now he was one big tough man. He was a decent honest man. And we're all gonna miss him very much. And you know the pearly gates in heaven? It's now gonna be called 'the Gorilla position.' Goodbye, my friend."

He was inducted into the Ithaca College Athletic Hall of Fame in 1973.

When Heenan was inducted into the WWE Hall of Fame in 2004, he ended his acceptance speech with, "Only one thing's missing: I wish Monsoon was here." In 2007, when Anthony Carelli made his debut with WWE, he was given the ring name "Santino Marella", as a tribute.

Marella was inducted into the Section V Wrestling Hall of Fame in 2010 along with longtime childhood friend Frank Marotta who gave a speech on his behalf.

Gorilla Monsoon was posthumously honored at the 50th anniversary show of the World Wrestling Council.

=== Legacy ===
Nick Ravo of The New York Times described Monsoon as "legendary" and "one of the most famous athlete-entertainers ever to don tights". Longtime industry journalist Bill Apter remarked, "He was one of the best heels – what wrestlers call a bad guy – in the business... the Gorilla Monsoon image was genuinely frightening." Todd Martin of the Pro Wrestling Torch commended Monsoon's physical agility, and noted that he became "a significant star in a lot of different places and had a very nice career". Martin reported that fellow wrestlers "generally speak pretty highly" of Monsoon, with particular praise for his movement and portrayal of his character. WE described him as "one of the most feared competitors" in professional wrestling, adding, "Whether in the ring, at the mic or behind the scenes, Robert 'Gorilla Monsoon' Marella will always be remembered as one of the greatest of all-time." He has been inducted into various wrestling halls of fame, including the WWF Hall of Fame in 1994.

Monsoon's announcing has garnered both praise and derision. In the Wrestling Observer Newsletter's annual awards poll, readers voted Monsoon Worst Television Announcer a record six times between 1985 and 1995. Appraising his commentary in 1988, journalist Stately Wayne Manor remarked, "Monsoon is aptly named after a counterproductive wind storm that nobody welcomes." Writer Dave Meltzer referred to conversations with "irate wrestlers in the 80s who hated Monsoon killing their psychology".

Todd Martin of the Pro Wrestling Torch noted that some regard Monsoon as "one of the all-time great announcers", while others feel he was "self-indulgent" and "dismissive of certain wrestlers", and had a tendency to "undermine the drama" by questioning the effectiveness of particular maneuvers. Baltimore Sun journalist Kevin Eck wrote that "a lot of people have fond memories of [Monsoon] from the 1980s boom period in WWF, especially his work with Bobby Heenan". Eck acknowledged the criticism of Monsoon among sections of the audience, but defended his use of absurdity and cliché as "entertaining", and argued that "he sold the angles well and got the characters over". PWInsider's Dave Scherer said of Monsoon, "I did love him as an announcer". Rolling Stone's Joseph Hudak reported that Heenan and Monsoon "are regarded as the greatest color-commentary team in pro-wrestling history", and "had a Martin-and-Lewis like chemistry behind the mic".

Heenan consistently named Monsoon as his favorite announcing partner. In contemplating his "Mount Rushmore of wrestling announcers", veteran commentator Jim Ross stated, "Gordon Solie, Bob Caudle, Lance Russell, Gorilla Monsoon would be four off the top of my head that I would put on there."

== Championships and accomplishments ==
=== Amateur wrestling ===
- Ithaca College
  - Athletic Hall of Fame (1973)

=== Professional wrestling ===
- Cauliflower Alley Club
  - Other honoree (1994)
- George Tragos/Lou Thesz Professional Wrestling Hall of Fame
  - Class of 2011
- Professional Wrestling Hall of Fame and Museum
  - Class of 2010
- World Championship Wrestling (Australia)
  - IWA World Heavyweight Championship (1 time)
- World Wide Wrestling Federation / World Wrestling Federation
  - WWWF United States Tag Team Championship (2 times) – with Killer Kowalski (1) and Bill Watts (1)
  - Slammy Award (1 time)
    - Most Evolutionary (1994) – Tied with King Kong Bundy
  - WWF Hall of Fame (Class of 1994)
- World Wrestling Association (Los Angeles)
  - WWA World Tag Team Championship (2 times) – with Luke Graham (1) and El Mongol (1)
- World Wrestling Council
  - WWC North American Heavyweight Championship (2 times)
- Wrestling Observer Newsletter
  - Worst Television Announcer (1985, 1991–1995)

| Preceded by Vince McMahon | Monday Night Raw Lead Announcer; 1994 | Succeeded by Jim Ross |
