= Rhythm and Blues (professional wrestling) =

Professional wrestling tag team

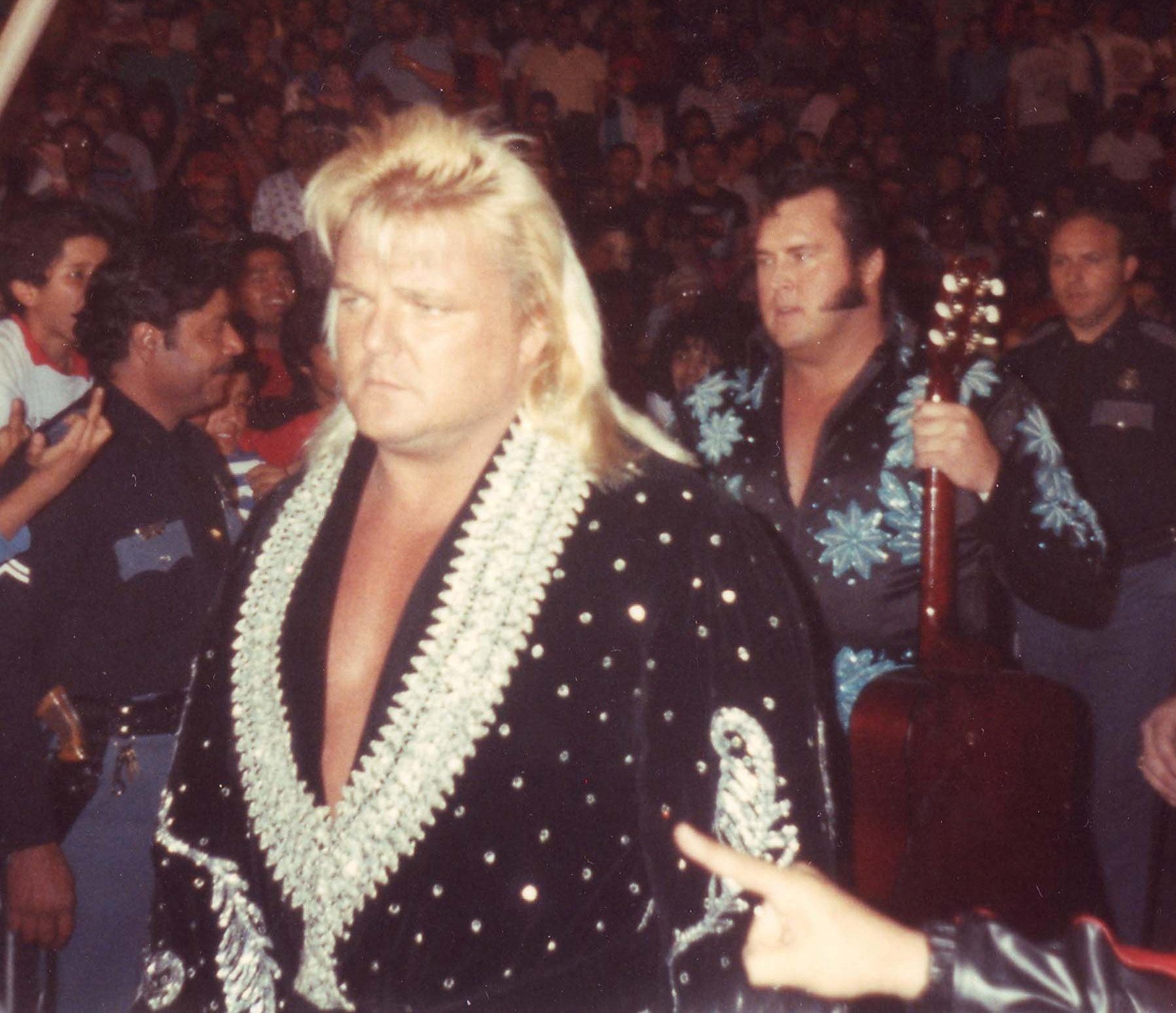
- Greg Valentine (left) and The Honky Tonk Man

Tag team
- Name(s): Double Trouble; Rhythm and Blues
- Members: The Honky Tonk Man; Greg Valentine
- Billed heights: Honky Tonk: 6 ft 1 in (1.85 m); Valentine: 6 ft 0 in (1.83 m)
- Combined billed weight: 514 lb (233 kg)
- Debut: November 1988
- Disbanded: December 1990
- Years active: 1988–1990

Rhythm & Blues was a tag team composed of The Honky Tonk Man and Greg "The Hammer" Valentine in the World Wrestling Federation from 1989 to 1991 and later on in the independent circuit for a short run.

== History ==
=== Background ===
Both the Honky Tonk Man and Greg Valentine were a part of manager Jimmy Hart's stable of wrestlers in the WWF, and both had previously held the WWF Intercontinental Title. Greg Valentine had also held the WWF Tag Team Championship with Brutus Beefcake as one half of The Dream Team. Honky Tonk Man and Valentine were also on the same team at Survivor Series 1988.

=== Team ===
In 1988, The Hart Foundation turned face and started a feud with former manager Jimmy Hart for picking The Fabulous Rougeaus over them. Honky Tonk Man and Greg Valentine teamed up (under the team name of “Double Trouble,“ though the announcers rarely used this name) to defend Jimmy Hart through the early parts of 1989 with the two teams facing off at WrestleMania V with the Hart Foundation winning the match. After the loss Honky Tonk Man and Valentine focused on singles feuds with "Superfly" Jimmy Snuka and ”Rugged” Ronnie Garvin respectively.

After the Fabulous Rougeaus left the WWF, Jimmy Hart reunited the Hammer and the Honky Tonk Man, gave them the team name “Rhythm and Blues,” and made changes to Greg Valentine’s appearance. Valentine had always been a blonde, ungimmicked wrestler who favored the traditional wrestling robe, but when teamed with the Honky Tonk Man, Valentine’s hair got dyed jet black, he was given shades, a white jacket and a guitar, though he quite obviously did not know how to play. Commentator Gorilla Monsoon nicknamed Greg Valentine “Boxcar” when he saw his changed appearance (most likely after Blues singer “Boxcar Willie”). As a commentator, Roddy Piper once opined "Elvis would be turnin' over in his grave if he was dead." In an interview for World Wrestling Insanity, the Honky Tonk Man states the team name was a suggestion made by Rick Rude. Announcer Sean Mooney said that since Honky Tonk Man was like Elvis, Greg Valentine was more like mashup between Roy Orbison and Johnny Cash.

Perhaps their most memorable moment came at WrestleMania VI when they were driven to the ring in a pink Cadillac driven by the then unknown Diamond Dallas Page. In the ring, they debuted their new song, "Hunka Hunka Honky Love"; the song was interrupted by The Bushwhackers who attacked them and broke their guitars much to the delight of the fans. The two teams had a lengthy feud over the summer of 1990 before Rhythm and Blues challenged the tag team champions the Hart Foundation for the titles during the fall. The team had several shots at the gold, but came up short every time.

At the 1990 Survivor Series, Rhythm and Blues partnered with Ted DiBiase on his "Million Dollar Team" along with the debuting Undertaker, taking on Dusty Rhodes' "Dream Team" of the Hart Foundation and Koko B. Ware. DiBiase would go on to be the only survivor for his team.

=== Break up and Reunions ===
Near the end of 1990 the Honky Tonk Man and Greg Valentine started arguing when Valentine got tired of Jimmy Hart’s interference in their matches. This was supposed to lead to a feud between Greg Valentine and the Honky Tonk Man, but the Honky Tonk Man left the federation in January 1991 thus nullifying the feud. Valenitne was released by the WWF in January 1992. He returned to the WWF at Survivor Series (1993) and left after Royal Rumble (1994).

They reunited on June 26, 1998, defeating Jake Roberts and Koko B. Ware at National Wrestling Conference in Sacramento, California. They occasionally continued working in the independents.

At some point after both men left the WWF the team reunited in the Northern States Wrestling Alliance where they won the tag team titles once.

Both were inducted into the WWE Hall of Fame separately, Valentine in 2004 and Honky Tonk in 2019.

Their last match together was on July 28, 2019, teaming with Colt Cabana defeating David Arquette, RJ City and The System at HOW FortuneBaynia II in Tower, Minnesota. Later that year, both men retired from wrestling.

== Championships and accomplishments ==
- Northern States Wrestling Alliance
  - NSWA Tag Team Championship (1 time)

== See also ==
- The Blond Bombers
