= WWE 2K15 =

2014 video game

- Cover art featuring John Cena
- Developers: Yuke's (Note: Additional work by Visual Concepts; PC version developed by QLOC.) n-Space (mobile version)
- Publisher: 2K
- Series: WWE 2K
- Platforms: PlayStation 3; PlayStation 4; Xbox 360; Xbox One; Microsoft Windows; Android; iOS
- Release: PlayStation 3, Xbox 360; NA: October 28, 2014; AU: October 30, 2014; EU: October 31, 2014; PlayStation 4, Xbox One; NA: November 18, 2014; AU: November 20, 2014; EU: November 21, 2014; Android, iOS; NA: April 16, 2015; Microsoft Windows; NA: April 28, 2015
- Genre: Sports
- Modes: Single-player, multiplayer

WWE 2K15 is a professional wrestling video game developed by Yuke's and published by 2K for PlayStation 3, PlayStation 4, Xbox 360, Xbox One, Microsoft Windows, Android and iOS. It is the sequel to WWE 2K14, and was succeeded by WWE 2K16. It was released on October 28, 2014, in North America and on October 31, 2014, in Europe for seventh generation consoles and released on November 18, 2014, in North America and on November 21, 2014, in Europe for eighth generation consoles. It was released for Microsoft Windows on April 28, 2015, and was the first WWE game to be released on the platform since WWE Raw, which was released in 2002. Online server play was shut down on May 31, 2016. It is the first game in the series to use the new WWE logo since it was introduced earlier in 2014, which was originally used as the logo of the WWE Network.

The game is based on the professional wrestling promotion WWE and WWE 2K15 serves as the first game in the series to signify the "new generation", placing a heavy emphasis on traditional and more relaxed gameplay, unlike the arcade-like combat prominent in previous installments. It also adds several new features to complement the main theme based around naturalism, adding a new chain grapple system at the beginning of matches, slowing the pacing of the matches and adding a new stamina bar to reflect and portray the quality of matches produced on WWE television.

== Gameplay ==
WWE 2K15 signifies as the start of a "new generation", which focuses on turning the franchise into a true wrestling game rather than "a fighting game with WWE Superstars in it." The new chain wrestling mini-game has been implemented (exclusive to eighth generation consoles and PC only) to make matches play out more realistically. Pressing the grapple button at the beginning of the match will initiate a collar-and-elbow tie up. At the beginning of the tie up, each opponent will press one of three face buttons to place their opponent into a side headlock, a wrist lock or a waist lock with a rock-paper-scissors style outcome. (Headlock beats Wrist lock, Wrist lock beats Waist lock, Waist lock beats Headlock.) Whoever wins will place their opponent in the corresponding hold, while both players rotate the right analog stick (space + movement keys on PC) to find a "sweet spot". If the attacker finds it first, they'll perform a move, if the defender finds it first, they'll gain the upper hand. Additionally, the attacking wrestler can strike or wrench the opponent's limb, making it harder for them to find the sweet spot. This mini-game only happens 2-3 times during the match and can be turned off via the options menu. Strikes have returned to their normal speed, with the improved collision and selling animations from the opponent. Unlike in previous games, superstars will not stand up immediately, after taking a bump or slam.

Gameplay screenshot of Bray Wyatt delivering his finisher, Sister Abigail, to CM Punk

This game also introduces the three-tier stamina meter, which controls the pace of a match. Through each move the player performs, especially striking and running, will drain the stamina meter. During the first tier, the wrestler will be full of energy and perform moves easily. During the second tier, the wrestler will begin to slow down. In the third tier, the wrestler will be completely exhausted, even being unable to perform their finishing moves should it drop too low. The stamina meter can also be turned off or adjusted to drain more slowly, and will slowly regenerate as long as a meter is not depleted. The game's submission system has been revamped. The "Breaking Point" gauge has been replaced with a two part circular gauge. The mechanic of the system remains mostly the same, but players only have to mash a single button rather than all four. Wake-up taunt finishers are now known as "Charged Finishers" which combines the taunt & finisher into a single animation by pressing and holding the finisher button when the opponent is grounded and then releasing it when they're on their feet (whereas on PC, holding the key is not necessary). Signature moves can now be stored as well. Catch and Catapult finishers have also returned. Both fighting styles and skill sets have been brought in to ensure that the characters behave more like their real-life counterparts. For example, high flyers like Rey Mysterio will not do power moves and will focus on diving and springboard moves while giants like The Big Show cannot climb the turnbuckle and will focus on power moves. Superstars who cannot climb to the top rope can climb to the second rope and deliver moves such as Bret Hart's elbow drop or Big Show's slingshot body splash.

Gameplay on the PlayStation 3 and Xbox 360 versions remains largely the same blueprint as previous entries in the series, most notably WWE 2K14. However, new rosters, new arenas, new championship titles and new contents have been introduced.

== Story modes ==
=== 2K Showcase ===
On August 4, 2014, IGN revealed that the game will feature a historical mode, which focuses on past WWE rivalries. Called the "2K Showcase", the story mode is similar to WWE 2K14's 30 Years of WrestleMania mode in that it focuses on historical events, but will be more like the Attitude Era mode in WWE '13 where it emphasizes specifics rather than generalities. The mode goes into more depth, giving a more detailed look at personal rivalries, treating them as mini-documentaries, with in-match cut scenes (with re-recorded commentary) and historical objectives to complete.

The 2K Showcase features 33 matches in total and is highlighted by two rivalries.

The first rivalry "Hustle, Loyalty, Disrespect" is between John Cena and CM Punk from 2011 to 2013. The rivalry started with Punk beginning to rebel against the chairman of the WWE, Mr. McMahon, and the way he ran the company and later when he claimed he did not earn the respect he deserved, leading into a matchup at Money in the Bank 2011 against Cena for the WWE Championship, as his WWE contract set to expire after the event. The rivalry ends with Punk's defeat by Cena at Raw.

The second rivalry "Best Friends, Bitter Enemies" chronicles the feud between Triple H, Shawn Michaels and the wrestling stable Evolution. The showcase begins at SummerSlam 2002 between Triple H and Michaels and covers various matches from Raw and PPV's ending with Triple H defeating Michaels at Bad Blood 2004 in a Hell in a Cell match.

The 2K Showcase also allows players to unlock various arenas, wrestlers and attires from each rivalry period, including Triple H's 2003 and 2004 attire and the stable Evolution from 2004.

==== DLC Content Showcases ====
WWE 2K15 has three additional Showcases, which were available as DLCs.

"One More Match" features the rivalry between Christian and Randy Orton during 2011, focusing in on Christian's quest for the World Heavyweight Championship, from Christian's ladder match against Alberto del Rio at Extreme Rules 2011 to their matchup at SummerSlam 2011.

"Hall of Pain" features Mark Henry's domination through 2011 and early 2012 and his path towards winning the World Heavyweight Championship and his brief resurgence challenging for the WWE Championship in early 2013, from his Money in the Bank 2011 matchup against The Big Show to his Wrestlemania 29 matchup against Ryback.

"Path of Warrior" focuses on the career of Ultimate Warrior, chronicling his rise during the late 1980s, commenting on the passing of the torch that Hulk Hogan demonstrated at WrestleMania VI and detailing Warrior's legacy within the World Wrestling Federation, from his SummerSlam 1988 matchup against Honky Tonk Man, with Jimmy Hart by his side, to his Wrestlemania XII matchup against Hunter Hearst Helmsley.

=== MyCareer ===
The game also has a "MyCareer" mode similar to NBA 2K15. Players take on the role of a Superstar made in the Creative Suite and follow the evolution of their WWE career, from the WWE Performance Center and NXT to the main event at WrestleMania, then your career is simulated 15 years into the future where you take place in one final match. This is the first time that the WWE 2K series features a Career mode and the first for the series overall since SmackDown vs. Raw 2010. Designed to be a branching, but linear, storyline in which players actions have effects on the future, MyCareer is reminiscent to story modes of earlier SmackDown games and WWF No Mercy in which decisions affected outcomes. The mode also features a morality system to allow players to decide whether they want to play as a face (fan favorite) or a heel (rule breaker) with each choice having an effect on the meter. There is also a 1-5 star match rating system that rates matches based on technique, pacing and momentum, with squash matches getting lower ratings and back-and-forth matches getting higher ratings. Wins and losses have little effect on match ratings with the goal being to put on the best match possible. This mode is exclusive to the PlayStation 4, Xbox One and Microsoft Windows versions of the game.

=== PlayStation 3 and Xbox 360 exclusive modes ===
==== Who Got NXT? ====
Replacing MyCareer on PlayStation 3 and Xbox 360 is a mode called "Who Got NXT?" which is a story mode focusing on up-and-comers from NXT: Adrian Neville, Bo Dallas, Corey Graves, Rusev, and Sami Zayn, the 5 playable NXT Superstars in the game. The NXT ArRival arena was also exclusive to the PS3/360 version of the game.

==== Proving Ground ====
Designed to be the spiritual successor to "Defeat The Streak" from WWE 2K14, Proving Ground pits players against John Cena, the top guy in WWE, in the Raw arena. This mode is only unlockable after completing the "Who Got NXT?" mode. The player will choose one of the 5 playable NXT Superstars to face Cena in a one-on-one match with a 30-minute time limit. Defeating Cena with all 5 NXT stars will unlock the entire roster (including created Superstars) to play the mode with.

== Creative Suite ==
Several features that were present in previous games, such as Story Designer, Create-A-Finisher, and Custom Soundtracks were removed from the game for unknown reasons. Create-A-Diva, Paint Tool, Create-A-Championship & Create-An-Arena remained available.

"Create-A-Superstar" returned with only 25 available slots for the Xbox One, PlayStation 4 versions while the PC version has 50 slots when the player updates the game on Steam. Superstar Heads has been reworked to allow all in-game wrestlers to be fully editable for the first time since WWE Raw 2, creating or editing a superstar takes up a slot. The paint tool has been removed on Xbox One, PlayStation 4 and PC and replaced with a new feature called "Superstar Studio" that allows players to import custom logos and fully edit or change a superstar attire.

== Visuals and audio ==
The PlayStation 4, Xbox One and Microsoft Windows versions of the game feature the same face and body scanning tech that was used for NBA 2K14 to ensure that the models look as close to their real-life counterparts as possible. Textures for clothing, beards & long hair have been updated, with 2K creating an entirely new development tool to more realistically portray beards. However, the PlayStation 3 and Xbox 360 versions have similar graphics to its predecessor, but with improved clothing textures and a new lighting system that lessens the shine from the superstar models. The PlayStation 4 and Xbox One versions are displayed in 1080p resolution and have an improved frame rate. Visual Concepts motion captured wrestlers performing their moves in an actual WWE ring over the course of forty days with the sound of each bump being recorded to ensure that it sounds like the actual move rather than using generic sounds of someone hitting the mat. The game has five times the amount of animation data than the previous game. Michael Cole and Jerry Lawler recorded new commentary, with approximately 30 hours of new commentary per commentator. The commentary was recorded with Cole and Lawler in the room at the same time to create more natural conversations and banter.

== Soundtrack ==
WWE 2K15: The Soundtrack

Soundtrack album by various artists
- Released: October 21, 2014
- Labels: WWE; Atlantic
- Producers: Craig Kallman (exec.); Neil Lawi (exec.)

For the first time since Smackdown vs. Raw 2010 video game, WWE 2K15 features a licensed soundtrack. WWE 2K15: The Soundtrack was curated by John Cena. It consists of music from a variety of artists from various music genres including hip-hop, rock, and country. In addition to the songs from the soundtrack, the game also includes four additional songs. The album version features two exclusive songs by Cena and Wiz Khalifa.

No.	Title	Artist(s)	Length
1.	"All Day"	Wiz Khalifa & John Cena	3:59
2.	"Ready"	B.o.B featuring Future	3:41
3.	"Free"	Rudimental featuring Emeli Sandé and Nas	4:30
4.	"We Dem Boyz"	Wiz Khalifa	3:45
5.	"Wild Ones (WrestleMania XXVIII version)"	Flo Rida featuring Sia	3:56
6.	"Bonfire"	Knife Party	4:32
7.	"Workin'"	Big Smo featuring Alexander King	3:35
8.	"Ghost"	Mystery Skulls	4:21
9.	"Come On Over"	Royal Blood	2:53
10.	"Breaks"	Wiz Khalifa & John Cena	4:04

=== In-game soundtrack ===
- Avenged Sevenfold – "This Means War"
- Dizzee Rascal featuring Teddy Sky – "Heart of a Warrior"
- Florida Georgia Line featuring Luke Bryan – "This Is How We Roll"
- Rise Against – "Zero Visibility"

== Releases ==
In July 2014, it was announced that Sting would be the game's pre-order bonus as two playable characters: One being the black and white Crow-inspired persona and the other being his surfer gimmick with the blond flattop hairstyle. A collector's edition of the game was announced on August 4. It includes premium packaging, a collectable art card hand-signed by Hulk Hogan, an exclusive Funko "Hollywood" Hulk Hogan vinyl figure, a piece of the ring canvas from Hogan's appearance on WWE Monday Night Raw on March 10, 2014, two playable pre-order launch-exclusive Hulk Hogan characters (nWo "Hollywood" Hulk Hogan and modern day Hulk Hogan), and the two playable Sting characters. A total of 25,000 collector's editions were made available for PlayStation 4 and Xbox One. CM Punk's inclusion in the game caused legal issues before release, as Punk had walked out of the company by release, however, 2K and Punk reached an agreement before release.

=== PlayStation 4 and Xbox One ===
The PlayStation 4 and Xbox One versions of the game were delayed three weeks from their original October 28 release date. 2K stated "The additional development time enables our talented teams to ensure the WWE 2K15 next-gen experience fully meets our expectations." The next gen versions were released on November 18, 2014.

=== Microsoft Windows ===
On April 21, 2015, WWE announced an upcoming Windows PC release in Spring of 2015. A week later, 2K announced the release date of April 28, 2015. This marks the first game in the WWE 2K series to be released on PC, as well as the first WWE game to be released on PC since WWE Raw which was released in 2002.

=== Mobile ===
A version of the game for mobile devices, developed by n-Space, was released for Android and iOS on April 16, 2015. 2K called it the "first simulation-based WWE video game for mobile devices". The mobile version features 10 playable superstars, three match types, full entrances & move sets, create a superstar, live multiplayer and a career mode. In July 2015, an update was released that improved controls and responsiveness.

== Downloadable content ==
On October 14, 2014, it was announced that the batch of upcoming DLC will include the "Accelerator", which unlocks all in-game content, and three additional rivalries for the 2K Showcase mode. "One More Match", which chronicles the feud between Christian and Randy Orton from 2011, was the first added alongside "Hall of Pain", which highlights Mark Henry's domination from 2011 to 2013, and "Path of the Warrior", which is the career retrospective of WWE Hall of Famer The Ultimate Warrior.

The "One More Match" DLC adds Christian and Edge as playable characters. The "Hall of Pain" DLC awards the player The Great Khali and unmasked Kane as playable characters. Also, additional attires are added for Mark Henry, Big Show, Sheamus, Randy Orton, Daniel Bryan and The Usos. "The Path of Warrior" DLC includes another attire for The Ultimate Warrior and adds Hulk Hogan, Rick Rude, Andre The Giant, Col. Mustafa, General Adnan, Sgt. Slaughter, Honky Tonk Man and "Macho Man" Randy Savage as playable characters.

Various packs were available at unspecified dates with Superstars, Legends, managers, and new moves included. The first pack available was the "NXT ArRival" DLC, which added The Ascension, Adam Rose, Emma and John "Bradshaw" Layfield as playable characters. The second pack added was the WCW Pack DLC which added WCW legends Fit Finlay, Lord Steven Regal, Bam Bam Bigelow, Diamond Dallas Page, and Lex Luger. All the DLC packs were freely included for the PC version of the game, except for Paige, who was an exclusive addition to the Season Pass.

On July 27, 2015, the pre-order Hulk Hogan DLC was removed from sale on PlayStation Network and Xbox Games Store following the controversy surrounding racist remarks made by Hogan, then after four years it was announced that Hogan will return for WWE 2K20 in 2019.

=== Season Pass ===
The Season Pass includes all three 2K Showcase story mode DLCs, the Accelerator DLC, and exclusive access to WWE Diva Paige.

== Reception ==
Reception

Aggregate score
Aggregator	Score
Metacritic	(PC) 70/100 (PS3) 55/100 (PS4) 62/100 (X360) 50/100 (XONE) 56/100

Review scores
Publication	Score
Eurogamer	3/10
Game Informer	7/10
GameRevolution	(PS4/XONE) 4/5 (PS3/X360) 2/5
IGN	(PS4/XONE) 7/10 (PS3/X360) 5.9/10
PC Gamer (US)	67/100
GameWatcher	7.5/10
Hardcore Gamer	3/5

WWE 2K15 received "mixed or average" reviews across all platforms, according to review aggregator website Metacritic.

=== PlayStation 3 and Xbox 360 ===
IGN gave the PlayStation 3 and Xbox 360 versions a 5.9 out of 10, saying: "WWE 2K15 is like seeing Brock Lesnar going from breaking The Undertaker's streak to losing to Hornswoggle during the pre-show in back-to-back WrestleManias. Not only is it surprising, it's also pretty sad. I would frequently grab my copy of last year's grappler with the intent to quickly check some changes, only to find myself reluctant to switch back due to the far better roster and single-player experience. Do yourself a favor, save your money, and buy WWE 2K14. The minor improvements to combat and commentary in 2K15 don't even come close to making up for what was lost." Game Informer gave the game a 7 out of 10, stating "This version of WWE 2K15 works if you're not planning on buying a new-gen console anytime soon... Custom creators, on the other hand, might as well continue to build up their creations on 2K14.

=== PlayStation 4 and Xbox One ===
IGN gave the PlayStation 4 and Xbox One versions a 7 out of 10, stating "WWE 2K15 on PlayStation 4 and Xbox One doesn't quite meet the expectations set by previous entries in the series. While the wrestlers look amazing and the combat feels significantly better, "MyCareer" mode is an absolute slog and everything else has been done better in previous years. Between the narrower historical mode, the shuttered creation suites, and the dearth of combat options for bigger groups, WWE 2K15 has lost some of the tools that brought previous entries to the main event." Eurogamer gave the game a 3 out of 10, stating "WWE 2K15 is a kick in the teeth. Graphically assured as it is, almost every other element of the 15-year-old series has been cut back, tampered with pointlessly or outright ruined. The series hasn't been good for a long time now, but this year is the first it's been actively bad. The wait for a great new WWE game continues." Hardcore Gamer gave the game a 3/5, saying "some players may pine for the older days of this franchise, where gameplay was frenetic and fast-measured. WWE 2K15 steps away from that methodology, and in turn delivers a much more deliberately-paced game, and one that is more intent on providing an authentic, one-to-one recreation of the drama that goes down in the squared circle."

=== Microsoft Windows ===
PC Gamer gave the Microsoft Windows version of the game a 67 out of 100, calling the game "a capable attempt to recapture the magic of WWE, let down by the decision not to update any single element of the console versions." Rock, Paper, Shotgun stated "It's a disappointing game," adding "WWE 2K15 is a lot like the WWE itself – burying its female performers, mishandling its roster, screwing up its own booking and failing to establish characters". GameWatcher gave the game a 7.5 out of 10, stating "unlike the game's release on consoles, the presence of mod support means that WWE 2K15 will actively evolve over time on PC. Until the mod community flourishes however and assuming the game's rough edges prove tolerable, WWE 2K15 remains an enjoyable wrestling yarn the likes of which PC players haven't been graced with in, well, forever. Maybe not the best there was or the best there is and certainly not the best there ever will be then, but it's a good start all the same and after all, legends have been fashioned from less."

=== Mobile versions ===
Pocket Gamer gave the mobile version a 7 out of 10, commenting that it is "a pretty solid experience, and it flourishes the deeper you get into it", while criticizing the price of the game. Gamezebo rated it 3.5 out of 5 stars, praising the graphics, multiplayer and controls but lamenting the overall lack of content. Technology Tell gave the album a "D" rating, calling it "a lazy, unresponsive, and completely shallow experience" 148Apps gave a 4 out of 5 stars rating and called the game "surprisingly complex". Game Informer stated the game is "a bare-bones, yet mechanically functional mobile title" and said it laid down a good groundwork for the next game.

=== Sales ===
As of August 2015, WWE 2K15 has shipped over three million copies.

== See also ==
- List of licensed wrestling video games
- List of fighting games
- List of video games in the WWE 2K Games series
- WWE 2K
