= Greg Valentine =

American professional wrestler (born 1951)

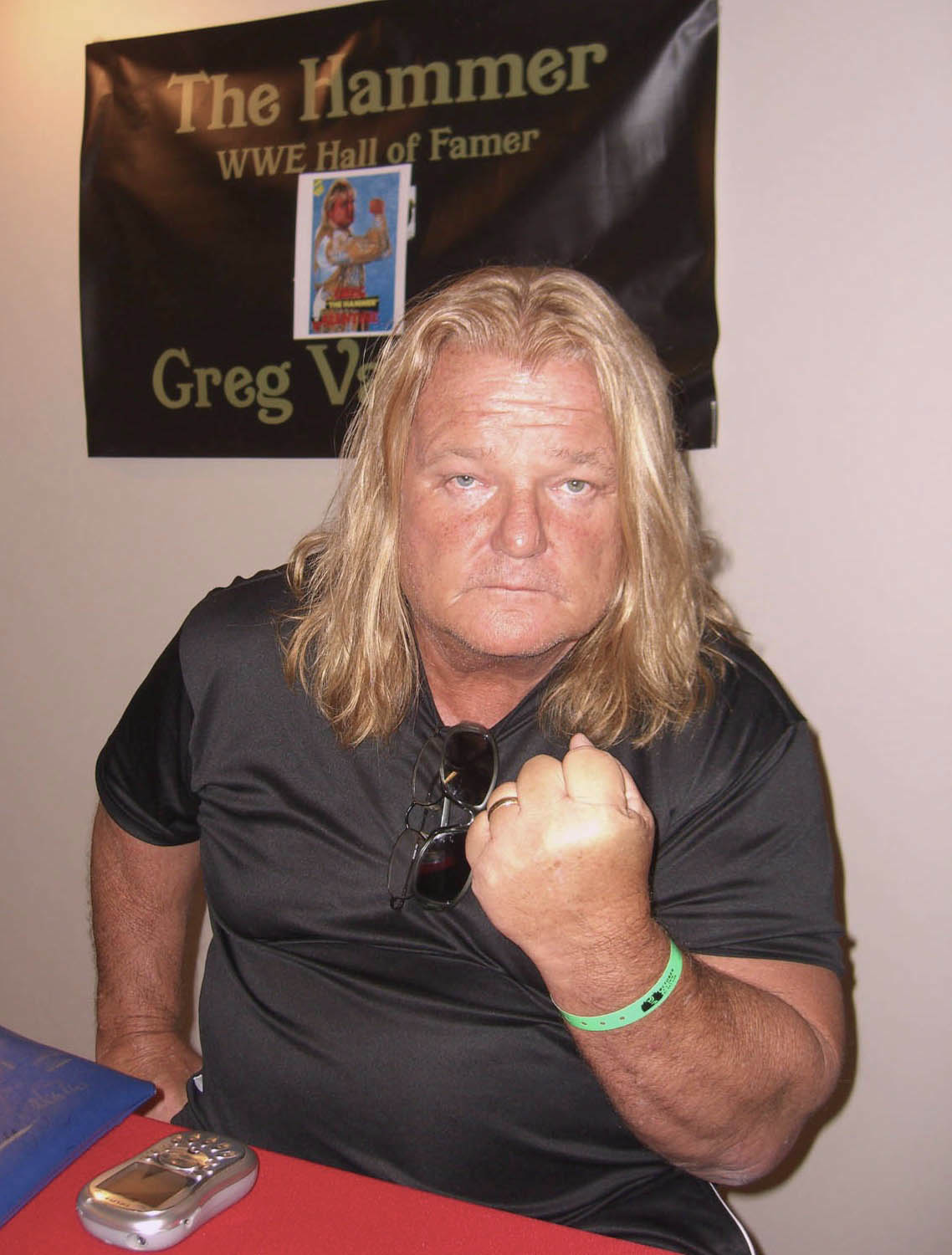
- Valentine in 2010

Personal information
- Born: Jonathan Anthony Wisniski; September 20, 1951 (age 75) Seattle, Washington, U.S.
- Spouse: Julie Wisniski (m. 1995)
- Children: 2
- Family: Johnny Valentine (father); Brian Knobbs (brother-in-law)

Professional wrestling career
- Ring name(s): Baby Face Nelson; The Blue Knight; Boxcar Willie; Greg Valentine; Johnny Fargo; Johnny Valentine Jr.
- Billed height: 6 ft 0 in (1.83 m)
- Billed weight: 243 lb (110 kg)
- Billed from: Seattle, Washington
- Trained by: Ed Farhat; Stu Hart
- Debut: April 24, 1970
- Retired: November 15, 2019

Jonathan Anthony Wisniski (born September 20, 1951) is an American retired professional wrestler, better known as Greg "the Hammer" Valentine. He is the son of wrestler Johnny Valentine.

Over five decades, Valentine held more than 40 championships, including the NWA United States Heavyweight Championship, WWC Universal Heavyweight Championship, WWF Intercontinental Heavyweight Championship, NWA World Tag Team Championship, and WWF World Tag Team Championship. An alumnus of Mid-Atlantic Championship Wrestling, the World Wrestling Federation and World Championship Wrestling, he was inducted into the WWE Hall of Fame Class of 2004 and the Professional Wrestling Hall of Fame in 2016.

== Early life ==
Born in Seattle, Washington, Wisniski traveled around Texas in his teens with his father Johnny Valentine. During a summer vacation, he decided to drop out of college and become a wrestler. His father initially tried to deter him, but eventually ceded to his wishes and sent him to Canada in 1970 to train under Stu Hart in Calgary.

== Professional wrestling career ==
=== Early career (1970–1976) ===
Wisniski was trained to wrestle by Stu Hart, wrestling his debut match in July 1970 against Angelo "King Kong" Mosca (he lost in around five minutes). Six months later, Wisniski relocated to Detroit, Michigan, to complete his training under the Sheik.

Initially reluctant to take his father's ring name, Wisniski wrestled as Baby Face Nelson before becoming Johnny Fargo, one half of the Fargo Brothers with Don Fargo between 1971 and 1974. The Fargo Brothers initially competed in the Buffalo, New York and Cleveland, Ohio based National Wrestling Federation before moving on to Texas. They split in 1974 and Wisniski went to Florida, where he began performing as Johnny Valentine Jr., hopeful that he could live up to his father's legacy. He later changed his ring name to Greg "the Hammer" Valentine, and was billed as Johnny Valentine's brother, not his son, because of fears that the elder Valentine would be thought of as too old to be a legitimate threat. Valentine remained in Florida for a year while also working in Los Angeles and in Japan under Antonio Inoki in 1975 and early 1976.

=== Mid-Atlantic Championship Wrestling (1976–1978) ===
In August 1976, Valentine debuted in Jim Crockett Jr.'s Mid-Atlantic Championship Wrestling and booked by George Scott, an affiliate of the National Wrestling Alliance based in the Carolinas and the Virginias. Valentine was hired to replace his father, who had been forced to retire after he broke his back in a plane crash in 1975. He immediately began feuding with Johnny Weaver, who he "retired" with a diving elbow drop. Valentine's elbow drop was promoted as a deadly move, with tapes of him breaking wooden boards with his elbow shown to the audiences before his debut.

Valentine then formed a tag team with Ric Flair, with whom he twice won the NWA World Tag Team Championship and held the NWA Mid-Atlantic Tag Team Championship (between June 30 and August 22, 1977). They first defeated Gene Anderson and Ole Anderson on December 26, 1976 (who nine years later would become in storyline Flair's "cousins") in Greensboro, North Carolina, injuring Gene so badly that he had to be stretchered out. They held the titles until May 8, 1977, when the Andersons defeated them in a steel cage match in the Charlotte Coliseum.

Flair and Valentine regained the tag titles from the Andersons on October 30, this time leaving Ole unable to leave under his own power. The team split after they were stripped of the titles in April 1978 by NWA president Eddie Graham as a result of their "unprofessional conduct". Flair then set his sights on the NWA World Heavyweight Championship, while Valentine held the NWA World Tag Team Championships once more with Baron von Raschke in 1978.

At the same time, Valentine feuded with Chief Wahoo McDaniel over the NWA Mid-Atlantic Heavyweight Championship. Wahoo had cost Valentine and Flair their first tag team championships (Wahoo, the then-nemesis of Flair, had been the special referee in the steel cage match), so Valentine was eager for revenge. On June 11, 1977, in Raleigh he defeated Wahoo, breaking his leg in the process. Though Wahoo's legs were too thick for Valentine to apply his signature figure four leglock, he managed to break Wahoo's ankle using a leg/ankle suplex. The heel Valentine then began wearing a T-shirt with the slogan "I broke Wahoo's leg" on the front and "No more Wahoo" on the back. Wahoo returned on August 9, 1977, and took back the title. Valentine would hold the title once more, defeating Wahoo again on September 10 and losing to Ken Patera on April 9, 1978.

=== World Wide Wrestling Federation (1978–1979) ===
Valentine began working on a casual basis for the World Wide Wrestling Federation (WWWF), then owned by Vincent J. McMahon, in November 1978. Managed by The Grand Wizard, he was given the gimmick of a methodical wrestler who broke the legs of all his opponents, including Chief Jay Strongbow. In February 1979, he wrestled then WWWF Heavyweight Champion Bob Backlund to a one-hour time-limit draw at Madison Square Garden.

=== Return to Mid-Atlantic Championship Wrestling (1979–1981) ===
Valentine returned to the NWA in late 1979 and asked Flair to reform their tag team. Flair, by then a face, declined. Valentine held the NWA World Tag Team Championship once more with Ray Stevens in 1980. Four days after their victory, the promoter, David Crockett told Valentine and Stevens that he possessed film which proved that the illegal man had been pinned in the tag match, nullifying the win. When Crockett threatened to send the film to NWA president Bob Geigel who said he would overturn their victory, Stevens and Valentine attacked him and cut the film up with a pocketknife, destroying the evidence.

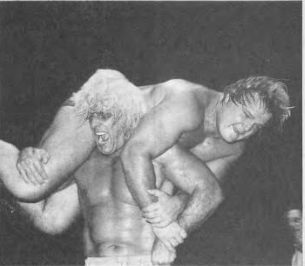
Ric Flair performing an airplane spin on Valentine during a 1980 match

Valentine later claimed to have "seen the light", and re-formed his team with Flair, who believed that Valentine was now a face. In a tag match against Jimmy Snuka and the Iron Sheik, Valentine abandoned Flair, leaving him outnumbered. Flair was beaten, and then Valentine snapped Gene Anderson's hickory cane over Flair's head, legitimately breaking his nose and splitting his lips. The former partners began feuding over Flair's NWA United States Heavyweight Championship, with Valentine finally defeating Flair for the title on July 26 in Flair's adopted hometown of Charlotte, North Carolina. He held the title until November 24, when he was beaten by Flair; Flair became one of Valentine's main opponents in the Mid-Atlantic territory.

=== World Wrestling Federation (1981–1982) ===
Valentine returned to the WWF, now known as the World Wrestling Federation, for a year in 1981 and continued to pursue the title. On October 19, he was pinned by Backlund, but then handed the title belt by the dazed referee. The title was held up, and Backlund defeated Valentine cleanly in the November 23 rematch. In January 1982, Valentine met Backlund yet again, this time in a steel cage, for the WWF Heavyweight Championship at the Philadelphia Spectrum, which Backlund won.

He also feuded with Pedro Morales over the WWF Intercontinental Heavyweight Championship, who he "injured" by suplexing him on the concrete floor of the arena. Valentine was not successful in winning this title either, and in mid-1982 left the promotion.

=== Mid-Atlantic Championship Wrestling (1982–1984) ===
Valentine would hold the United States Championship twice more, renewing his feud with Wahoo in 1982 and defeating him for the title on November 4 with the assistance of his manager, Sir Oliver Humperdink. Roddy Piper began pursuing the title, and, after Piper gave Valentine a cake with a dog collar inside, the two had a series of brutal dog collar matches, most notably at Starrcade '83: A Flare for the Gold, where Piper pinned Valentine in a non-title match after repeatedly whipping him with the steel chain. The feud was intensified by Valentine's propensity to focus on Piper's ear, which had been injured earlier in his career and would bleed easily. Piper would eventually defeat Valentine on April 16, 1983, but Valentine regained the title on April 30 in Greensboro, North Carolina; after the match, where he regained the United States Championship from Piper, Valentine hit Piper in the ear with the United States Championship title belt. He dropped the title to Dick Slater on December 14, just before leaving them for the World Wrestling Federation.

=== World Wrestling Federation (1984–1992) ===
==== Intercontinental Champion (1984–1985) ====
Valentine went back to the WWF in 1984, predicting that Vince McMahon's plan for national expansion would succeed. His first manager was Captain Lou Albano, and he was later managed by Jimmy Hart.

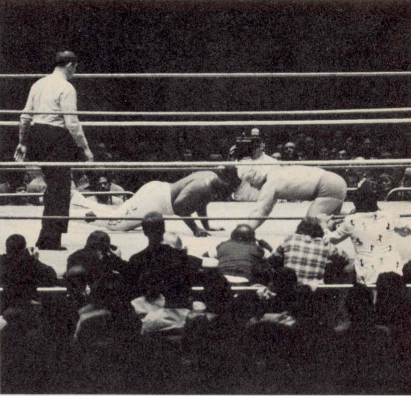
Valentine (right) vs Junkyard Dog (left) at the first WrestleMania in 1985.

On September 24, 1984, in London, Ontario, Valentine defeated Tito Santana for the Intercontinental Heavyweight Championship, focusing on Santana's injured knee throughout the match. Santana initially thought he had the match won, but had in fact only achieved a two-count. As Santana was celebrating, Valentine rolled him up for the pin and the title. Following the win, Valentine put Santana in the figure four leglock, reinjuring him. While Santana was sidelined having leg surgery, Valentine feuded with the Junkyard Dog, who he faced in an Intercontinental Heavyweight Championship Title match at the very first WrestleMania held in Madison Square Garden. Valentine pinned the JYD after using the ropes, but Santana came to ringside and informed the referee, who restarted the match. Valentine then walked out, losing the match by count-out but saving his title. Santana eventually healed and fought Valentine in many matches. He went on to win the title back on July 6, 1985, in a steel cage match in Baltimore, ending Valentine's 285-day reign, the fifth-longest in Intercontinental title history. Valentine, incensed over losing the championship belt, destroyed it in the steel cage, forcing the WWF to get a new Intercontinental Heavyweight Championship belt (in reality, this was pre-planned as the WWF already had a newer, more modern Intercontinental Heavyweight Championship belt made and destroying the old title belt was seen as the perfect way to introduce the new one).

==== Dream Team; New Dream Team (1985–1987) ====
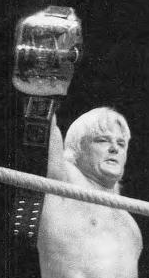
Valentine as WWF Tag Team Champion, c. 1985

Valentine would then form a tag team with Brutus Beefcake known as The Dream Team, managed by "Luscious" Johnny V. Initially the team was managed by both Jimmy Hart and Johnny V, but the WWF dropped Hart from the group and he went on to manage the Hart Foundation. On August 24, 1985, at The Spectrum in Philadelphia, the Dream Team defeated the U.S. Express for the WWF Tag Team Championship when Beefcake rubbed Johnny V's lit cigar in Windham's eyes allowing him to be pinned. They held the titles until April 7, 1986, when they were defeated at WrestleMania 2 by The British Bulldogs (Davey Boy Smith and the Dynamite Kid). At WrestleMania III, The Dream Team defeated the Rougeau Brothers as a result of interference by Johnny V and Dino Bravo. Upset because of a missed move by Beefcake during the match, Valentine left with Bravo and abandoned Beefcake, resulting in Brutus turning face later on in the night.

Replacing Beefcake with Dino Bravo, Valentine formed the New Dream Team. Valentine was unhappy about teaming with Bravo, who he felt he had little chemistry with. After the WWF asked him to "kidnap" Matilda, the bulldog mascot of The British Bulldogs, Valentine resigned. He was brought back soon after, with Jimmy Hart again as his new manager (while the "kidnap" angle was reassigned to The Islanders) but was used in a much diminished role between 1987 and 1990.

==== Feuds with Don Muraco and Ron Garvin (1988–1990) ====
Valentine was entered in the WWF World Heavyweight Championship tournament at WrestleMania IV, where he defeated Ricky "the Dragon" Steamboat in the first round before losing to "Macho Man" Randy Savage, the eventual winner of the tournament, in the quarter-finals.

In May 1988, Jimmy Hart fitted Valentine's left shin with a shin guard, citing a mysterious injury to his wrestler, and proclaiming the shin guard as Valentine's "road to the gold".

Later in 1988, Valentine feuded with "The Rock" Don Muraco, who had turned face a year earlier. The feud was triggered when Valentine viciously attacked Muraco's manager, former WWF Heavyweight Champion Superstar Billy Graham. Graham, walking with a cane, tried to intervene when Valentine held the figure-four leglock on jobber Ricky Ataki, after already winning the match. Valentine then put the figure-four leglock on Graham, who had a plastic hip. The feud was abruptly halted when Muraco was dismissed by the WWF, despite Valentine's pleas for Muraco not to be fired so that the promising program could be allowed to run. (Kayfabe magazine Inside Wrestling had run a story on the feud, conversely claiming that it was Muraco, yearning to personally avenge Graham's injuries, who had begged the WWF not to dismiss Valentine).

In April 1989 he began feuding with "Rugged" Ronnie Garvin. Two weeks after WrestleMania V (where he teamed with the Jimmy Hart managed Honky Tonk Man in a loss to the now babyface Hart Foundation), he defeated Garvin in a retirement match on Superstars of Wrestling by reversing a small package and holding on to the ropes. Garvin became a referee until Valentine and Hart managed to have him fired. Garvin then became a ring announcer, and began aggravating Valentine. At SummerSlam 1989, for his match with Hercules, Garvin announced Valentine as being Hercules' "so-called opponent" and at 249 lbs looking to Garvin like he was "overweight by thirty pounds" as he approached the ring. Other insults by Garvin during the introduction included Valentine not knowing whether he was "coming or going" and being the only wrestler Garvin knew who had "two left feet" and that he had a "pipsqueak, poor excuse for a manager". Following the match, Garvin then announced Hercules as the winner when Valentine cheated to win, despite the referee declaring Valentine the winner. Valentine knocked Garvin out of the ring before having a further punching match with Hercules while Garvin climbed back in the ring and nailed Valentine. Valentine and Jimmy Hart eventually demanded that Garvin be reinstated so that they could fight in the ring.

For some time Valentine had been wearing a shin guard, which he would rotate (so it covered his calf, not his shin) in order to increase the pressure exerted by the figure four leglock. He referred to the shin guard as the "Heartbreaker". Valentine would also (illegally) attach the shin guard to his arm in order to accentuate his elbow drops. In the course of the feud, Garvin countered with a rotated shin guard of his own, which he dubbed "the Hammer Jammer". The feud culminated in a submission match at the 1990 Royal Rumble. Garvin utilized the "Hammer Jammer" during the match, using it to "counter" Valentine's figure-four leglock when Valentine applied it on Garvin during the match (rather than writhing in pain as normal during the hold, Garvin was smiling and making faces at Valentine). Jimmy Hart managed to remove the "Hammer Jammer" from Garvin's leg, after which Valentine systematically wore down Garvin's leg, but eventually lost after Garvin hit him with the Heartbreaker and applied a sharpshooter, forcing Valentine to submit.

==== Rhythm and Blues (1990–1991) ====
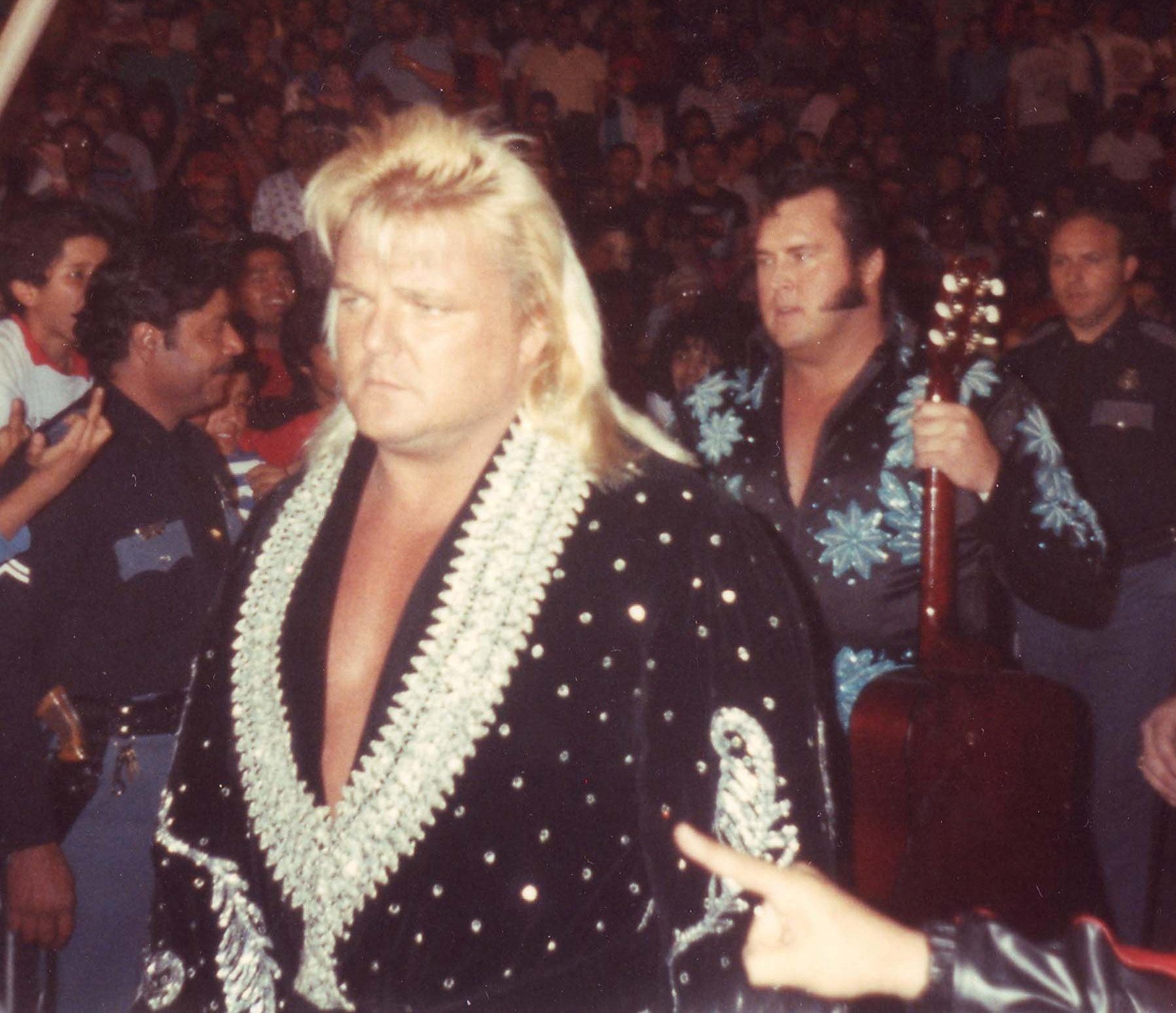
Valentine (left) with his Rhythm and Blues tag team partner The Honky Tonk Man (March 7, 1989)

Shortly after, Valentine formed a tag team with The Honky Tonk Man. For around eight months Valentine resisted dying his hair black (an idea of Jesse "The Body" Ventura) but eventually relented and since Honky Tonk Man was an Elvis Presley look alike, Valentine became a Roy Orbison look alike and the team became known as Rhythm and Blues and were managed by Jimmy Hart. Rhythm and Blues feuded with The Bushwhackers (Butch and Luke) and The Hart Foundation against whom they received title shots, but were overshadowed by the Legion of Doom (Animal and Hawk), who were by then dominating the tag division, feuding with former champions Demolition in six man tag main events also featuring WWF World champion Ultimate Warrior while the Harts' tag team title defences against Valentine and Honky were relegated to opening match status. Famously during the time of Rhythm and Blues, WWF announcer Gorilla Monsoon would proclaim every time Valentine got on the microphone and sang (while also attempting to play a guitar) that "if you hung [sic] The Hammer for being a good singer you would hang an innocent person".

In mid December his partner The Honky Tonk Man departed the World Wrestling Federation. An angle was recorded on December 28, 1990, at Madison Square Garden where he was defeated by Saba Simba after accidentally being hit by Jimmy Hart's guitar; afterwards he almost attacked his manager and began to be cheered by the fans. On January 7, 1991, the angle was furthered. In a match that saw Davey Boy Smith defeat Dino Bravo, Valentine was again accidentally hit by Jimmy Hart's megaphone. This time Valentine attacked Jimmy Hart and turned face. However, Valentine abruptly departed the company and along with the Honky Tonk Man's aforementioned departure from the WWF this effectively cancelled the planned feud with Valentine.

==== Babyface run (1991–1992) ====
On January 19, 1991, Valentine participated in the fourth annual Royal Rumble match. He lasted forty four minutes. On the February 17, 1991 edition of Wrestling Challenge, the WWF aired footage from the incident with Jimmy Hart at Madison Square Garden at the end of 1990. This began the televised process of his face turn. Valentine lost to the Jimmy Hart managed Earthquake at WrestleMania VII, and was defeated again at SummerSlam 1991 by Irwin R. Schyster. He Lost To The Undertaker On The October 1, 1991 Episode Of Prime Time Wrestling. He participated in the 1992 Royal Rumble for the vacated WWF Championship, where he attacked his old rival Ric Flair before being eliminated by the Repo Man. Later that month he finished his run with the company, defeating Skinner at a house show on January 25, 1992, in Chicago, Illinois.

=== Universal Wrestling Federation (1991) ===
Herb Abrams had aggressive plans for his Universal Wrestling Federation, announcing the signings of name wrestlers such as Andre the Giant, Steve Williams, The Killer Bees, and Bob Orton. Added to this list was Greg Valentine, who joined the company on January 9, 1991. He made his debut that night at a television taping in the Penta Hotel in New York City, defeating Sonny Blaze. He later defeated Mike Durham at the same taping, and was interviewed by Albano, his former WWF manager in the "Captain Lou's Corner" segment on UWF television. However his stay in the UWF was technically only for that TV taping; as with Andre the Giant, Vince McMahon responded to Abram's announcement by luring Greg Valentine back to the WWF. In an interview in 2000, Valentine stated that Abrams retaliated by withholding payment for his appearances in the UWF. During this period, Valentine also visited Egypt where he challenged local champion Mamdouh Farag.

=== World Championship Wrestling (1992) ===
Conscious of his diminishing status, Valentine left the WWF and signed with World Championship Wrestling (WCW) in 1992. He made his debut on February 4, 1992, at a house show in Norfolk, Virginia. Teaming with Terry Taylor, the duo defeated Marcus Alexander Bagwell and Tom Zenk. On February 15, 1992, he made his debut on television. Two weeks later, he teamed again with Terry Taylor to defeat Ron Simmons and Big Josh to win the WCW United States Tag Team Championship. Throughout the spring the duo successfully defended the belts against Zenk and Bagwell on various house shows. On May 17, 1992, at WrestleWar 92 they lost the titles to The Freebirds. At Beach Blast, Valentine pinned Marcus Bagwell. In July, he became involved in an angle with Dusty Rhodes and Dustin Rhodes where he confronted the father/son duo on WCW Worldwide. Both Rhodes attacked Valentine, only to then be retaliated upon by Dick Slater and The Barbarian.

Valentine faced Dustin Rhodes on multiple house shows that summer and was winless. While in this series, Valentine also began to regularly team with Dick Slater. The duo wrestled The Freebirds and Barry Windham & Dustin Rhodes. On Clash of the Champions XX, Bobby Eaton & Arn Anderson defeated Slater and Valentine in a rare heel vs heel match. In September 1992 Valentine engaged in a house show feud with Van Hammer and was undefeated. In the fall he continued to team with Slater in matches against The Steiner Brothers. On television, Valentine's fortunes continued to wane. On the October 11, 1992 edition of WCW Pro he was defeated by Shane Douglas. On the October 19, 1992 taping of WCW Saturday Night he arrived to learn that he was to lose to Sting on that night's taping. In addition he was not scheduled to be booked at any upcoming events, and Valentine resigned from the promotion.

=== World Wrestling Federation (1993–1994) ===
He reappeared in the WWF at the 1993 Survivor Series under a mask as The Blue Knight in an elimination match pitting Shawn Michaels (who was substituting for Jerry Lawler) and his three "knights" (who also included Barry Horowitz as the Red Knight and Jeff Gaylord as the Black Knight) against the Hart Family (Bret Hart, Owen Hart, Bruce Hart and Keith Hart.) He would return again, as Greg Valentine, at the 1994 Royal Rumble, lasting over twenty minutes before being eliminated by Rick Martel. That summer Valentine would wrestle three times on a July house show tour, facing Bob Backlund on each occasion.

=== Independent circuit (1994–1996) ===
Valentine went on to tour the independent circuit, wrestling in Japan, with the Hamilton based International Championship Wrestling promotion and with the American Wrestling Federation.

=== World Championship Wrestling (1996–1998) ===
Starting in the summer of 1996, Valentine made several appearances with WCW over the course of the next two years. He was used on a pay-per-appearance basis, but was rarely utilized and was allowed to continue wrestling on the independent circuit. On July 1, 1996, Valentine faced Randy Savage on WCW Monday Nitro in Landover, Maryland. Valentine was used primarily on television, facing The Giant, Harlem Heat, and Lex Luger. The following year he was used sparingly as well, again on television but had a 6–2 record, defeating Mike Enos, Bobby Eaton, and Billy Kidman. Valentine wrestled four times for the promotion in 1998 and was 3–1. He finished his WCW run with a victory over Pat Tanaka on February 17, 1998.

=== Late career (1998–2019) ===
On June 26, 1998, Valentine reunited with the Honky Tonk Man as they defeated Jake Roberts and Koko B. Ware at National Wrestling Conference. On October 10, 1999, he appeared on the infamous Heroes of Wrestling pay-per-view, pinning George "The Animal" Steele with the assistance of Sherri Martel. He wrestled on the 2000 tour of the United Kingdom for All Star Wrestling in which Yokozuna died. He was also involved with the short-lived X Wrestling Federation as an investor and as an in-ring performer. In the 2000s, he began reducing his independent dates in order to pursue a career in real estate.

On March 13, 2004, Valentine was inducted into the WWE Hall of Fame class of 2004 by his former manager Jimmy Hart. The following night, at WrestleMania XX at Madison Square Garden, Valentine received loud applause when the class of 2004 was introduced. Shortly after being inducted into the WWE Hall of Fame, Valentine dedicated the plaque he received to his late father by saying: "This one's for you pop, Johnny Valentine".

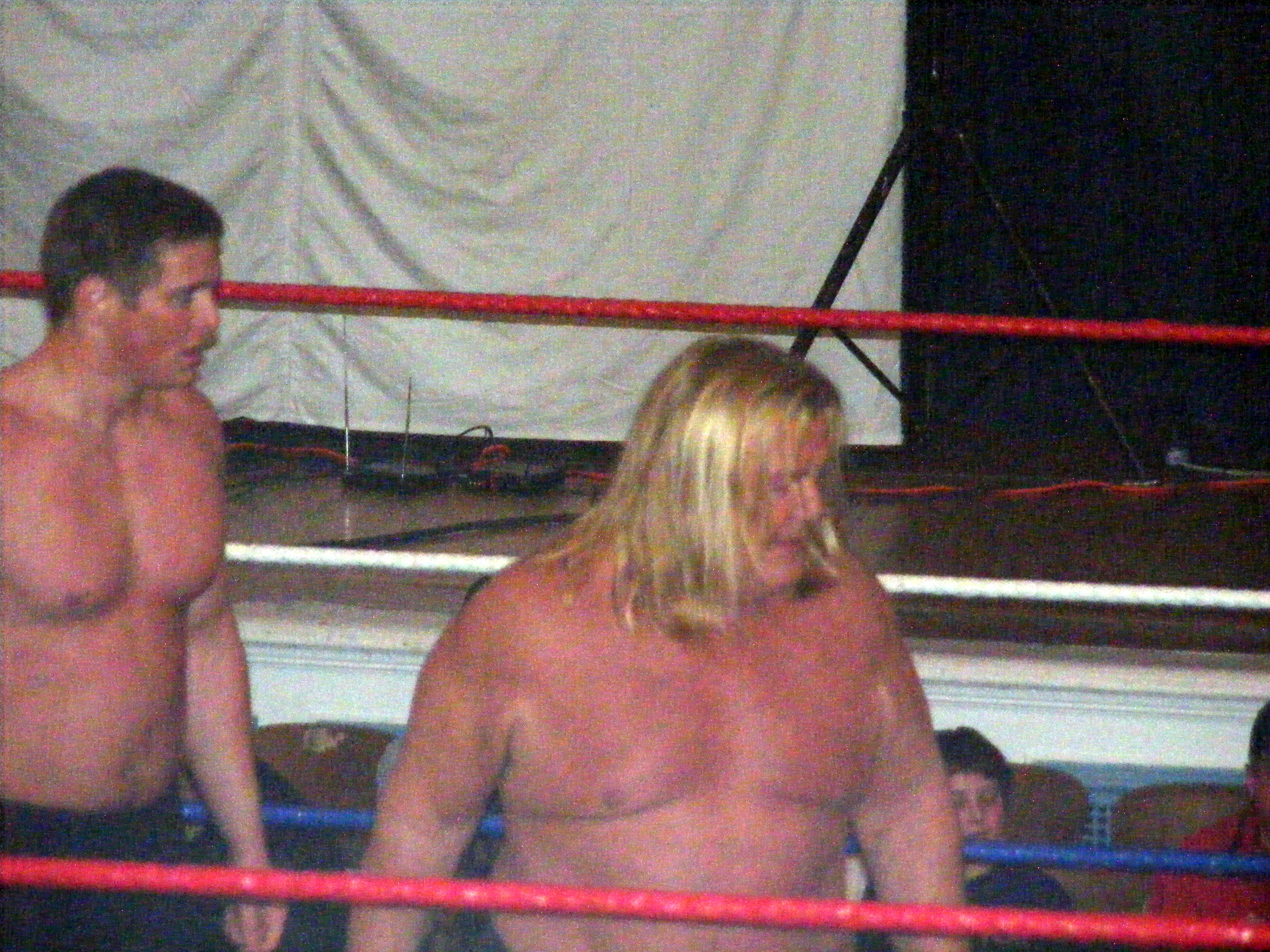
Valentine (right) in the ring with Reid Flair in 2009

On January 29, 2005, at WrestleReunion, Valentine won a seventeen-man battle royal to become the IWA Heavyweight Champion. He lost the title to Tito Santana at WrestleReunion #2 on August 27 of that year. Valentine also wrestled for several independent promotions, including AWA Superstars of Wrestling, which toured New England. In AWA Superstars of Wrestling, Valentine regularly wrestled Tony Atlas.

On October 3, 2005, Valentine made an appearance at WWE Homecoming, and on October 23 he was defeated by Rob Conway (then using a gimmick similar to that of Randy Orton's gimmick of "the legend killer") on an episode of WWE Heat after Eugene interfered on his behalf, causing the referee to award a victory via disqualification to Conway.

In May 2007, Valentine defeated Quinson Valentino to win the Canadian Grand-Prix Wrestling Championship in Morrisburg, Ontario. On August 24, 2007, Valentine returned to Ontario to defend the CGPW Championship against Koko B. Ware in Cornwall, after Koko defeated Valentine in a non-title match, on the previous night, in Ottawa. Valentine was successful in defeating Koko in Cornwall, though the title was vacated due to inactivity.

In late 2007, Valentine made an appearance in JCW or Juggalo Championship Wrestling reforming the Dream Team with Brutus Beefcake. in an 8 team elimination match for the then vacant JCW Tag-Team Titles. Where they were the first team to be eliminated after a slightly botched sunset flip from Necro Butcher.

Valentine was present at the retirement ceremony of his long-time friend, Ric Flair, on the March 31, 2008 episode of WWE Raw.

On January 29, 2011, Valentine was inducted into the Legends Pro Wrestling "Hall of Fame" by Jack Blaze in Wheeling, West Virginia, at their annual "LPW Over The Edge" event. Valentine retired from wrestling in 2019. His match was on November 15, 2019 when he teamed with Andrew Anderson defeating Pete Nixon and The Executioner at East Coast Pro Wrestling in Franklin, New Jersey.

== Personal life ==
Greg married Julie on February 14, 1995. He had two daughters, Vanessa and Romaine, with his first wife, who once appeared on WWF TV in 1984 to give Valentine a back rub, which he claimed was the secret of his success. Vanessa began training with the Hart Brothers in the late 1990s. Vanessa died of cancer in 2014. He is a born again Christian and occasionally speaks at high schools and colleges with Ted DiBiase. He is also a part of Christian wrestling organization, World Impact Wrestling. He is the brother-in-law of wrestler Brian Knobbs.

== Media ==
Valentine has appeared on an episode of Hogan Knows Best as one of Hulk's party guests. He also co-starred in Fuse's Insane Clown Posse Theater along with Insane Clown Posse members Violent J and Shaggy 2 Dope. The cast was rounded out with Michelle "Sugar Slam" Rapp, Kevin Gill, and Vampiro. Valentine played an usher who ejected guests from the theater when their time is up on the show.

He appeared as a playable character on Legends of Wrestling, Legends of Wrestling II, WWE Day of Reckoning, Showdown: Legends of Wrestling and WWE Legends of WrestleMania. He was also downloadable content in WWE 2K17 and also appears in WWE 2K18 along with Brutus Beefcake as The Dream Team. He also appears in WWE 2K19.

In 2008 Valentine co-starred with George "The Animal" Steele in a short film entitled Somethin Fishy, in which the two former wrestlers purchase a fishing camp. The film served as the pilot for a comedy series that was not developed further.

== Legacy ==
British wrestler Steve Crabtree (the son of promoter Max Crabtree and nephew of headline star Big Daddy) was billed as "Greg Valentine" while wrestling for Joint Promotions in the 1980s. He won the 1986 televised "Golden Grappler" trophy tournament. His brother Spencer Crabtree also wrestled as "Scott Valentine".

== Championships and accomplishments ==
- Alabama Wrestling Federation
  - AWF Heavyweight Championship (1 time)
  - AWF Tag Team Championship (1 time) – with Brutus Beefcake
- American Wrestling Association
  - AWA Midwest Tag Team Championship (2 times) – with Jerry Miller
- American Wrestling Federation
  - AWF Tag Team Championship (1 time) – with Tommy Rich
- Bad Boys of Wrestling
  - BBOW Heavyweight Championship (1 time)
- Canadian Grand-Prix Wrestling
  - CGPW Heavyweight Championship (1 time)
- Cauliflower Alley Club
  - Men's Wrestling Award (2018)
- International Championship Wrestling
  - ICW Heavyweight Championship (1 time)
- International World Class Championship Wrestling
  - IWCCW Heavyweight Championship (1 time)
- International Wrestling Association
  - IWA Heavyweight Championship (1 time)
- Legends Pro Wrestling
  - LPW Hall of Fame (Class of 2011)
- Maple Leaf Wrestling
  - NWA Canadian Heavyweight Championship (Toronto version) (1 time)
- Mid-Atlantic Championship Wrestling / World Championship Wrestling
  - NWA Mid-Atlantic Heavyweight Championship (2 times)
  - NWA Mid-Atlantic Tag Team Championship (1 time) – with Ric Flair
  - NWA Mid-Atlantic Television Championship (2 times)
  - NWA Television Championship (2 times)
  - NWA United States Heavyweight Championship (3 times)
  - NWA World Tag Team Championship (Mid-Atlantic version) (4 times) – with Baron von Raschke (1), Ray Stevens (1), and Ric Flair (2)
  - WCW United States Tag Team Championship (1 time) – with Terry Taylor
- National Wrestling Alliance
  - NWA North American Heavyweight Championship (2 times)
- NWA Hollywood Wrestling
  - NWA Americas Heavyweight Championship (2 times)
  - NWA "Beat the Champ" Television Championship (2 times)
- New England Wrestling Alliance
  - NEWA Hall of Fame (Class of 2013)
- North State Wrestling Alliance
  - NSWA Great Lakes Television Championship (1 time)
  - NSWA Tag Team Championship (1 time) – with The Honky Tonk Man
- NWA Texas
  - NWA North American Heavyweight Championship (1 time)
- NWA Tri-State
  - NWA United States Tag Team Championship (Tri-State version) (2 times) – with Bill Watts (1) and Gorgeous George Jr. (1)
- National Wrestling Federation
  - NWF World Tag Team Championship (4 times) – with Don Fargo
- Prime Wrestling
  - Prime Tag Team Championship (1 time) – with Jim Neidhart
- Professional Wrestling Hall of Fame
  - Class of 2016
- Portland Wrestling
  - Portland Pacific Northwest Heavyweight Championship (2 times)
- Professional Wrestling Federation
  - PWF Heavyweight Championship (1 time)
- Pro Wrestling Illustrated
  - PWI Most Hated Wrestler of the Year (1975, 1979, 1983)
  - Ranked No. 49 of the top 500 singles wrestlers in the PWI 500 in 1992
  - Ranked No. 119 of the top 500 singles wrestlers of the "PWI Years" in 2003
- Pro Wrestling Ohio
  - PWO Tag Team Championship (1 time) – with Jim Neidhart
- Pro Wrestling Revolution
  - PWR Heavyweight Championship (1 time)
- St. Louis Wrestling Hall of Fame

- Class of 2025

- Western States Sports
  - NWA Western States Tag Team Championship (1 time) – with Don Fargo
- Windy City Pro Wrestling
  - WCPW League Heavyweight Championship (1 time)
- World Wrestling Council
  - WWC Caribbean Heavyweight Championship (1 time)
  - WWC Universal Heavyweight Championship (1 time)
- World Wrestling Federation/Entertainment
  - WWF Intercontinental Heavyweight Championship (1 time)
  - WWF Tag Team Championship (1 time) – with Brutus Beefcake
  - WWE Hall of Fame (Class of 2004)

== Bibliography ==
- Casanova, Kenny (June 20, 2026). Greg "The Hammer"- Forever Valentine. WOHW Publishers. p. 497. ISBN 979-8182355513.

== See also ==
- The Dream Team
- Rhythm and Blues
