= Brutus Beefcake =

American professional wrestler (born 1957)

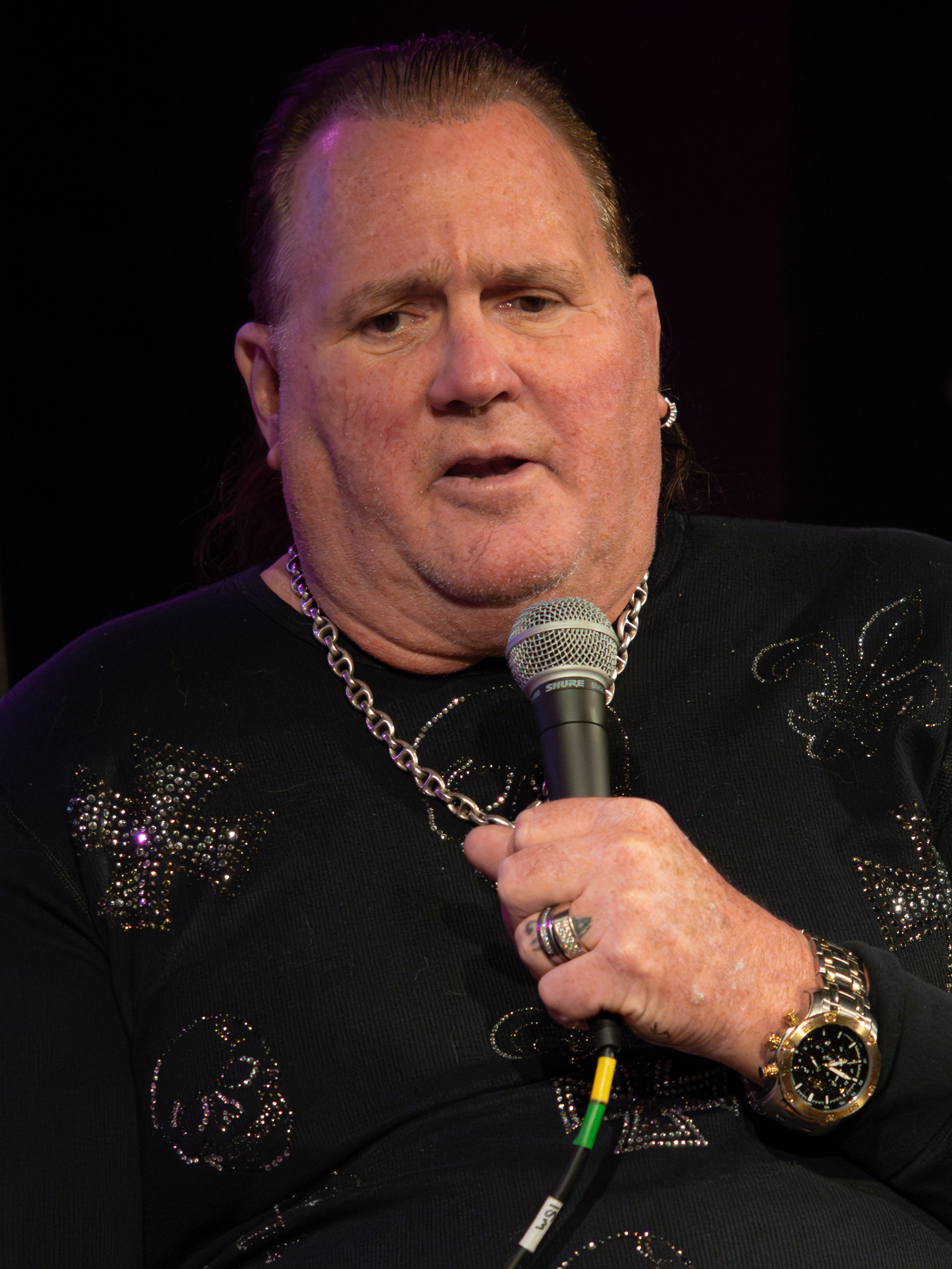
- Beefcake in 2024

Personal information
- Born: Edward Harrison Leslie; April 21, 1957 (age 69) Tampa, Florida, U.S.
- Spouses: Kirsten Georgi (m. 1987; div. 1991); Barbara McGondel (m. 1993; div. 2009); Melissa DeGloria (m. 2013)
- Children: 1

Professional wrestling career
- Ring name(s): Baron Beefcake; Big Brother Booty; The Booty Man; Brother Bruti; Brute Force; Brutus Beefcake; The Butcher; The Clipmaster; The Disciple; Dizzy Golden; Dizzy Hogan; Ed Boulder; Eddie Golden; Eddie Hogan; Furface; The Mariner; The Man With No Face; The Man With No Name; The Zodiac
- Billed height: 6 ft 4 in (193 cm)
- Billed weight: 272 lb (123 kg)
- Billed from: San Francisco, California "The Land of Yin and Yang" "Parts unknown"
- Trained by: Hulk Hogan; Ivan Koloff
- Debut: 1977
- Retired: November 2015

Edward Harrison Leslie (born April 21, 1957) is a retired American professional wrestler, best known for his work in the World Wrestling Federation (WWF, now WWE) under the ring name Brutus "the Barber" Beefcake. He later worked for World Championship Wrestling (WCW) under a wide variety of names.

Leslie held nine titles throughout his career, and is a former WWF World Tag Team Champion with Greg Valentine. He also competed for major singles titles on pay-per-view and television, headlining Starrcade 1994, in a match against then-WCW World Heavyweight Champion Hulk Hogan. Leslie was inducted into the WWE Hall of Fame class of 2019 by Hogan.

The career of Leslie is highlighted on the 44th episode (fifth season and fourth episode) of the Dark Side of the Ring.

== Professional wrestling career ==
=== Early career (1977–1984) ===
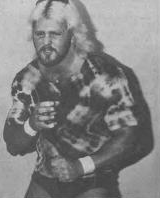
Leslie as "Ed Boulder", c. 1981

Leslie began his career at the side of Terry Bollea in 1977. At the time, the two were billed as brothers. Leslie was Ed Boulder when Bollea wrestled as "Terry Boulder", and Dizzy Hogan when Bollea became "Hulk Hogan". In a 2000 shoot interview, he recalled his first match was a tag match with Ron Slinker, against Ox Baker and Eric the Red. In later years this created confusion among fans, many of whom actually believed that Leslie and Bollea were real-life brothers. Leslie briefly wrestled in Bill Watts' Mid-South territory and in the World Wrestling Federation (WWF) in 1980. In July 1984, Leslie went to the Catch Wrestling Association in Germany/Austria and unsuccessfully challenged Otto Wanz for the CWA World Heavyweight championship.

=== World Wrestling Federation (1984–1993) ===
==== Dream Team (1984–1987) ====
Leslie rejoined the WWF as a heel named Brutus Beefcake in late 1984. Introduced in a vignette that portrayed him as a male stripper, Beefcake was a vain character who dressed in outlandish outfits. Beefcake made his WWF debut on the August 11 episode of Championship Wrestling, by appearing at ringside during a match between Ivan Putski and Ron Shaw. Two weeks later, on the August 25 episode of Championship Wrestling, Beefcake wrestled his first match in the WWF by defeating Jose Luis Rivera. After beating enhancement talents during the first weeks of his career, Leslie was joined by "Luscious" Johnny Valiant as his manager on the October 13 episode of Championship Wrestling. As a singles wrestler, Beefcake's first major rivalry began against the WWF Champion Hulk Hogan, whom Beefcake wrestled for the title on a number of occasions. Hogan sought revenge on Beefcake after he and Valiant injured Hogan's protégé, Hillbilly Jim at a show in San Diego on February 25, 1985, where Jim had appeared in Hogan's corner for a match between Hogan and Beefcake. During this time, Beefcake also feuded with David Sammartino whom he fought to a double disqualification at the inaugural WrestleMania at Madison Square Garden.

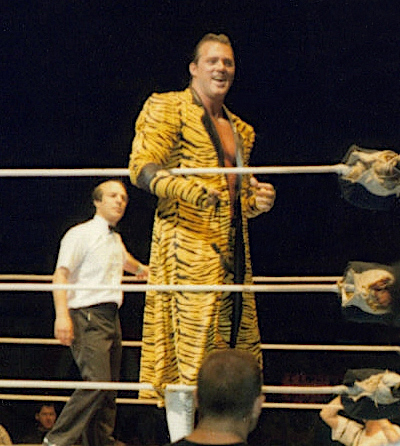
Beefcake, c. 1986

In the summer of 1985, Beefcake began teaming with Greg Valentine. They became known as The Dream Team. They soon began challenging The U.S. Express (Mike Rotundo and Barry Windham) for the WWF Tag Team Championship. Initially, the U.S. Express successfully met these challenges but, on August 24 in the Philadelphia Spectrum, Dream Team defeated US Express to win the Tag Team Championship. They won the titles after Beefcake rubbed Valiant's lit cigar into Windham's eye. The title change aired live on the local PRISM network, and on the September 7 episode of Championship Wrestling via tape delay. They defended the belts for eight months, primarily against The American Express (Dan Spivey and Mike Rotunda), The Iron Sheik and Nikolai Volkoff, The Hillbillies (Uncle Elmer and Hillbilly Jim), and The British Bulldogs (Dynamite Kid and Davey Boy Smith). At WrestleMania 2, in Rosemont, Illinois, The Dream Team lost the title to the British Bulldogs. They were unsuccessful in rematches for the title, including a two out of three falls match at Saturday Night's Main Event VII. Dream Team soon dropped to mid-card status.

==== The Barber (1987–1990) ====
The Dream Team broke up at WrestleMania III. After defeating The Rougeau Brothers at the pay-per-view, the team had an argument and Beefcake was left in the ring while Valentine and Valiant left with Dino Bravo. This provided the impetus for Beefcake to turn face. In the immediate next match on the show, Beefcake helped Roddy Piper to defeat Adrian Adonis, reviving Piper after Adonis had rendered him unconscious. Per match stipulations, Adonis would have his head shaved. Beefcake undertook this task and earned the nickname "the Barber". Thereafter, Beefcake started bringing garden shears (with the handles taped to resemble barber poles) to the ring, and using a sleeper hold (hitherto a specialty of both Piper and Adonis, used heavily by both in their WrestleMania III match) as his finishing move. After a match, he would strut around the ring, "snipping" his fingers like scissors to indicate he was about to cut his defeated opponent's hair. As he did (using either his shears or an electric razor) he would throw handfuls of hair into the air for the amusement of his fans.

After coming out on top of a feud with former partner Valentine and ex-manager Valiant, Beefcake feuded with WWF Intercontinental Champion The Honky Tonk Man. Beefcake vowed to not only win the title, but put Honky to sleep and cut his duck's tail. Beefcake never made good on that vow, since Honky got himself disqualified from most of their matches (wrestling titles generally do not change hands on a disqualification). Honky often had assistance from a mysterious pig-tailed and sunglassed blonde named Peggy Sue (WWF Women's Champion Sherri Martel usually played this character during television tapings and PPV events, but at house shows "she" was Jimmy Hart in drag). Beefcake countered with a "woman" of his own: "Georgina" (George "the Animal" Steele in drag). The feud concluded at WrestleMania IV, where Honky was again disqualified, after interference from Hart. Though Honky escaped with the title and his hair, Beefcake caught Hart towards the end of the match and humiliated him with a partial haircut.

Beefcake (left) facing "Outlaw" Ron Bass, c. 1988

Beefcake also feuded with "Outlaw" Ron Bass in 1988, beginning when Bass attacked him after a match on Superstars of Wrestling, lacerating his head with a spur. As a result, the injured Beefcake missed his scheduled Intercontinental Championship match against Honky at the first SummerSlam event on August 29. He ultimately defeated Bass in a hair versus hair match at Saturday Night's Main Event XIX.

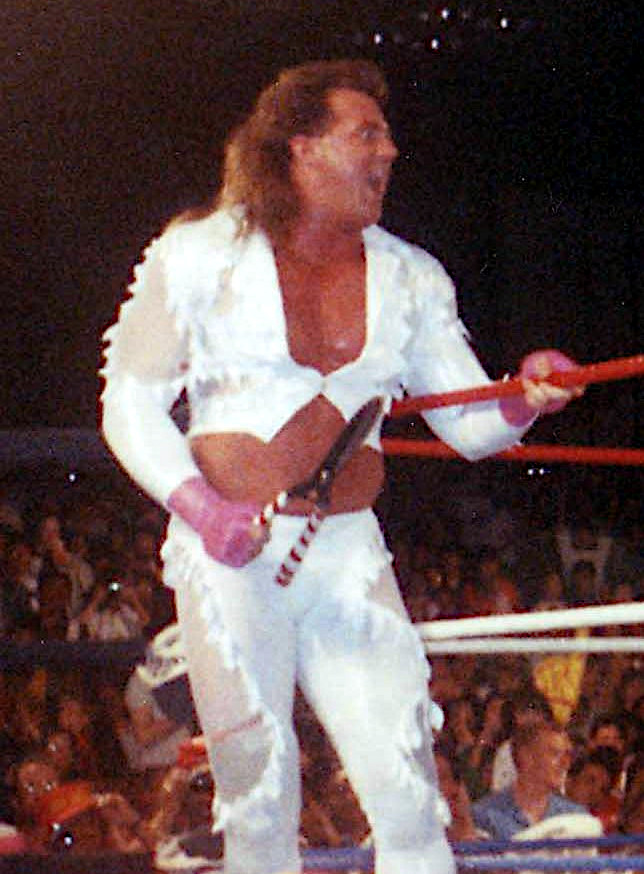
Leslie with Beefcake's trademark haircutting shears, c. 1989

Beefcake had a feud with Randy Savage during 1989. On "The Brother Love Show" (an interview segment on Superstars of Wrestling), Beefcake called Savage's new manager, Sensational Sherri, "Scary Sherri," and an angered Savage attacked him and, with the help of Sherri, humiliated him with a haircut. Eventually, the feud became intertwined with one between Hulk Hogan and Zeus (based around the movie No Holds Barred). Hogan was simultaneously involved in his own feud with Savage over the WWF Championship. During his match against Savage, Beefcake was assaulted by Zeus. At SummerSlam, Hogan and Beefcake with their manager, Miss Elizabeth teamed to defeat Savage and Zeus. The rivalry resumed when, on December 27, No Holds Barred was shown as part of a pay-per-view special called "No Holds Barred: The Movie-The Match." In the match portion of the show (taped two weeks earlier in Nashville, Tennessee), Hogan and Beefcake defeated Savage and Zeus in a steel cage match.

At WrestleMania VI, Beefcake became the first person to pin Mr. Perfect on national television. During the spring and summer of 1990, Beefcake was involved in the Intercontinental Championship tournament and, along with opponent Dino Bravo, were counted-out in the first round. Beefcake was scheduled for a WrestleMania VI re-match against Perfect, for the latter's Intercontinental Championship at SummerSlam.

==== Parasailing accident and return (1990–1993) ====
In July 1990, a serious parasailing accident put Leslie out of action. He was helping a parasailer friend prepare for takeoff, when the boat driver mistook a cue to take off and pulled the friend's knees hard into Leslie's face, crushing his facial skeleton. Experiencing an "unbearable" level of pain, Leslie pleaded with doctors to let him die. Over 100 feet of wire and 32 screws were required to construct a new face. Leslie lost his nasal cavity, jaw, and had no ability to breathe on his own. Leslie's wrestling career was put on hold for almost two years. As a result, Leslie missed his match at SummerSlam, and was replaced by Texas Tornado as Perfect's challenger.

For a short time in early 1991, a masked character played by Leslie appeared on television. The character would run in during matches and attack various heels (notably Rick Martel, Dino Bravo and Earthquake). He would run in on their matches, punch them a few times, throw a headbutt and immediately retreat. He never wrestled a match and was not given an official name, although the gimmick has since been branded as “Furface”. Dave Meltzer at this time reported that most wrestlers were against his return due to concerns about his safety and their ability to have quality matches while avoiding injuring him further.

On the April 14, 1991 episode of Wrestling Challenge Leslie returned as Brutus The Barber Beefcake, hosting a full-time regular interview segment called "The Barber Shop". The Rockers split up on The Barber Shop when Shawn Michaels superkicked partner Marty Jannetty and threw him through a plate glass window; this turned Michaels heel and began his singles run to stardom. The final Barber Shop segment took place in February 1992. Newly turned heel Sid Justice attacked Beefcake and destroyed the set, building heat for his feud with Hulk Hogan. After this, Beefcake disappeared once again.

Beefcake once again returned to the WWF on the February 1, 1993 episode of Monday Night Raw. Beefcake's facial injury was used in an angle with Money Inc. (Ted DiBiase and Irwin R. Schyster). In what was billed as Beefcake's "comeback match", he defeated DiBiase on Raw by disqualification when DiBiase and IRS double-teamed him. IRS then tried to reinjure Beefcake, hitting him with a steel briefcase. Longtime heel manager (and manager of Money Inc.) Jimmy Hart turned face by trying to stop his team from hurting Beefcake, and Hulk Hogan returned to the WWF after a one-year hiatus. Hogan and Beefcake teamed for the first time since December 1989, as the Mega-Maniacs, with Hart as their manager. The Mega-Maniacs (with Beefcake wearing a protective facemask) challenged Money Inc. for the Tag Team Championship at WrestleMania IX. and, though gaining some revenge, lost via disqualification. WrestleMania IX was Leslie's final wrestling appearance on WWF television, although he remained active on the house show circuit. He teamed with Hogan in multiple matches against Money Inc. in June 1993, winning by disqualification. He also defeated Masa Saito on May 3 in Fukuoka, Japan. Following a final tour of Europe from July 9 to August 6, (defeating Terry Taylor in eight straight matches), Leslie left the WWF.

=== Independent circuit (1993–1997) ===
After leaving WWF, Beefcake wrestled for a few appearances in New Japan Pro-Wrestling. On April 16, 1994, Beefcake defeated Nailz for the WWWA Heavyweight Title. Then on April 13, 1996, he defeated Jim Neidhart for IPWA. He lost to his former tag partner Greg Valentine on May 31, 1997, for Wrestling International Pro.

=== World Championship Wrestling (1994–1996, 1998–1999) ===
==== The Butcher; The Man with No Name (1994–1995) ====
In 1994, Leslie debuted in World Championship Wrestling (WCW). At first, he only made short appearances with Hulk Hogan, who referred to him as Brother Bruti (as he did when they were tag team partners in the WWF in 1989 and 1993). At Halloween Havoc in October 1994, following Hogan's cage match victory over Ric Flair, Leslie was revealed as the masked man who had attacked Hogan just before his title match with Flair at Clash of the Champions XXVIII in August that year, with Leslie, Kevin Sullivan, and Avalanche attacking Hogan. Leslie, Sullivan, and Avalanche subsequently formed a stable known as the Three Faces of Fear and Leslie adopted the ring name "The Butcher" (a reference to how he had "butchered" his friendship with Hogan). The Butcher wrestled his first match for WCW on November 9, defeating Larry Santo in a bout that aired on WCW Saturday Night. At Clash of the Champions XXIX in November 1994, Hogan, Sting and Dave Sullivan defeated the Three Faces of Fear in a six-man tag team match with Mr. T as special guest referee. At Starrcade '94: Triple Threat on December 27, The Butcher challenged Hogan in a WCW World Heavyweight Championship title match, which The Butcher lost. At Clash of the Champions XXX on January 25, the Monster Maniacs (Hogan and Randy Savage) defeated The Butcher and Sullivan.

At SuperBrawl V on February 19, 1995, The Butcher accompanied Kevin Sullivan to ringside for his match against Dave Sullivan. The match ended when Kevin threw Dave into The Butcher, knocking him to the ground with a head injury, enabling Kevin to pin Dave with a roll-up. Subsequently, tension developed between Sullivan and The Butcher, culminating in a match that aired on WCW WorldWide on April 22, 1995, pitting Sullivan and The Butcher against Stars & Stripes. After Stars & Stripes won the match following a miscommunication between Sullivan and The Butcher, Sullivan gave a promo in which he blamed The Butcher for their losses at Starrcade and Clash of the Champions XXX, then attacked The Butcher. On the April 22 episode of WCW Saturday Night, Sullivan gave a promo in which he stated that The Butcher's belief in "Hulkamania" made him weak, and dubbed him "The Man With No Name". On the May 13 episode of WCW WorldWide, Leslie - wrestling as "The Man with No Name" - defeated Sullivan after Avalanche attacked him, breaking up the Three Faces of Fear. The Man with No Name faced Sullivan in a rematch at Slamboree '95: A Legends' Reunion in May 1995, with Sullivan defeating The Man With No Name.

==== The Zodiac; The Booty Man (1995–1996) ====
Leslie subsequently became "The Zodiac", a character wearing black and white face paint and only ever saying, "Yes, no, yes, no!", and re-joined Sullivan and Avalanche (redubbed "The Shark") in their new stable, the Dungeon of Doom. At Fall Brawl '95: War Games on September 17, Hogan, Savage, Sting, and Lex Luger defeated the Dungeon of Doom (The Zodiac, The Shark, Kamala, and Meng) in a WarGames match. The Dungeon of Doom feuded with Hogan for most of the remainder of 1995. At World War 3 in November 1995, The Zodiac competed in the World War 3 match for the vacant WCW World Heavyweight Championship, which was won by Randy Savage. The Zodiac eventually turned against his stablemates, revealing himself to have been a mole.

In February 1996, Leslie began wrestling as "The Booty Man", with the gimmick of a man who was infatuated with his own buttocks, and would shake them on the way to the ring and during matches. His signature move was a high knee (a homophone of "hiney"). He joined forces with Hulk Hogan and Randy Savage in their feud against the Four Horsemen. After Marc Mero left WCW in March 1996, his valet Kimberly Page joined with the Booty Man, and became known as "The Booty Babe". The Booty Man feuded with Diamond Dallas Page (at the time, Kimberly's real-life husband). At Uncensored on March 24, 1996, The Booty Man defeated Page in a loser leaves town match. At Slamboree in May 1996, The Booty Man teamed with Rick Steiner in the Lord of the Ring Tournament, losing to Diamond Dallas Page and The Barbarian in the semi-finals. After Hulk Hogan formed the New World Order (nWo) at Bash at the Beach in July 1996, then regained the WCW World Heavyweight Championship at Hog Wild, The Booty Man attempted to join by wearing an nWo shirt and presenting a birthday cake to Hogan, but was instead attacked by Hogan, Scott Hall, and Kevin Nash. Leslie left WCW in December 1996 following its "Christmas Brawl" tour of Germany.

==== The Disciple (1998–1999) ====
In the final segment of the February 23, 1998, edition of Monday Nitro, Leslie returned as The Disciple, the bodyguard of Hollywood Hogan. He was almost unrecognizable at first, with a full beard, sunglasses, and nWo-styled biker attire. His true identity was later revealed onscreen by Roddy Piper, during his feud with Hogan. The Disciple accompanied Hogan to the ring for his matches, and would often be called on to assist in beating down an opponent, often using his new finishing move, "The Apocalypse". After Hogan became the WCW World Heavyweight Champion in April, these beatdowns often included the title belt itself, which The Disciple would drape over his shoulder before performing The Apocalypse, driving its centerplate into the victim's face on the way down.

The Disciple was abducted by The Warrior during Warrior's feud with Hogan, and was later seen hanging from his feet backstage. After being brainwashed by The Warrior, he turned on Hogan and became the second member of Warrior's One Warrior Nation. After Warrior left WCW, The Disciple's push largely diminished and he spent the remainder of his time in WCW as a jobber. His last WCW PPV match was the World War 3 battle royal on November 22, 1998. In his final televised match, aired on the November 6, 1999 WCW Worldwide, he wore attire much like he did in his early WWF days as Brutus Beefcake (though still under the Disciple ring name) as he lost to Hacksaw Jim Duggan.

=== Late career (1999–2015) ===
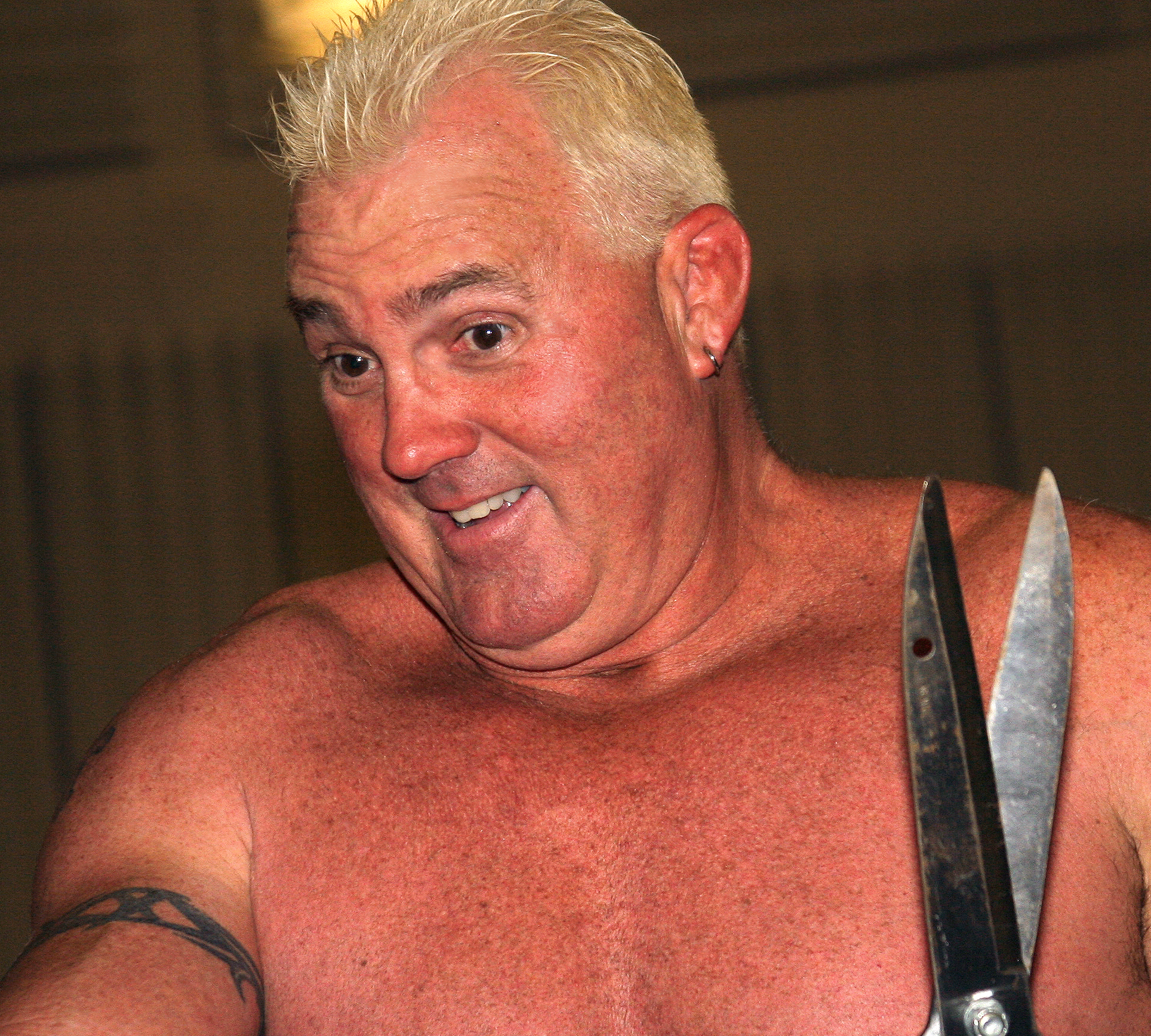
Leslie in 2009 with his shears

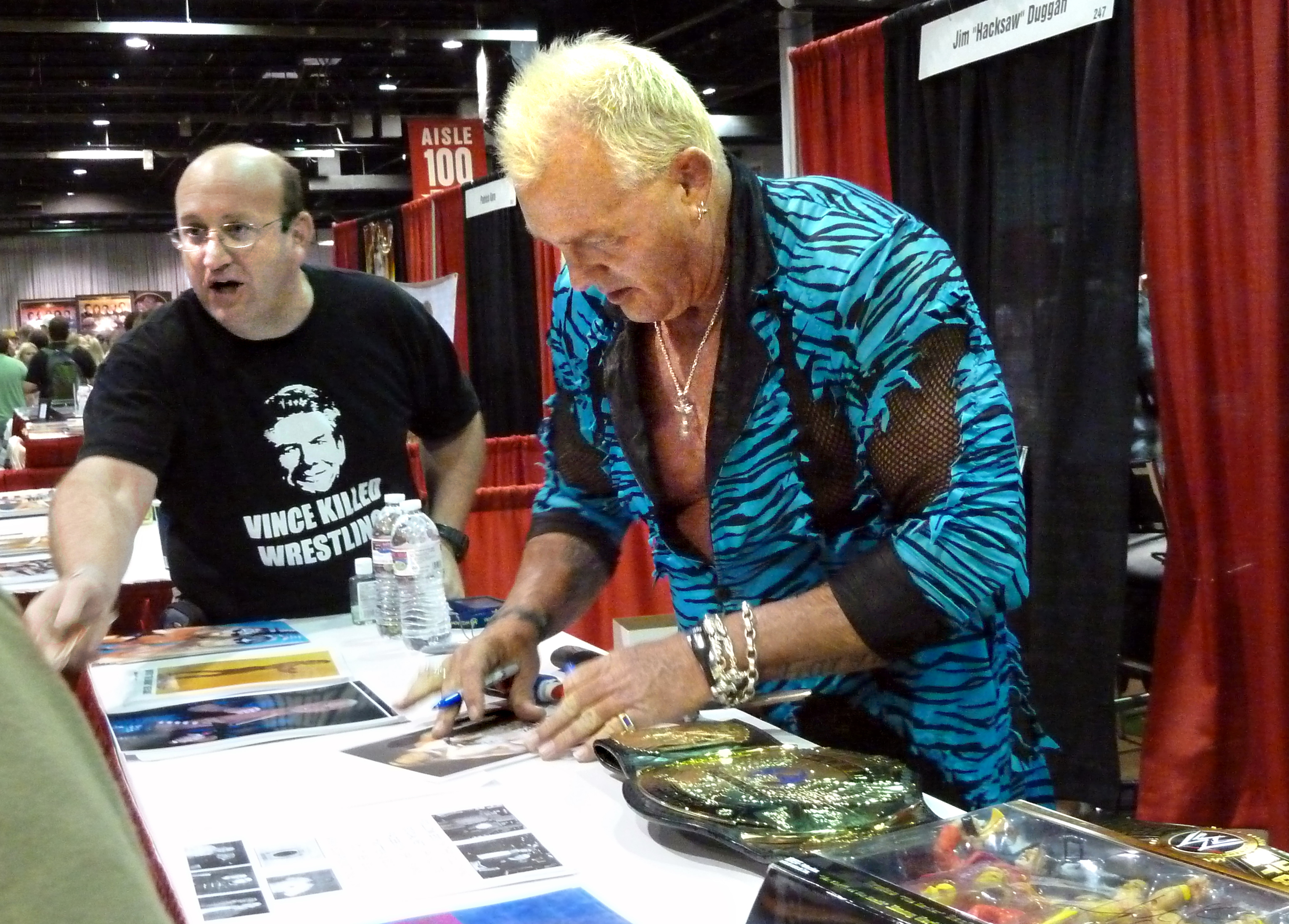
Beefcake signing autographs at Comic Con 2013

In May 2000, Beefcake wrestled for the Extreme Wrestling Federation, in a match against Rex Diamond. On June 30, 2000, he lost to The Barbarian in a hardcore match for i-Generation Superstars of Wrestling in Australia. After retiring, Leslie became part of the Christian wrestling group, World Impact Wrestling. He also started a wrestling school. He made an appearance at Pro Wrestling Syndicate's debut show in Garfield, New Jersey, on June 24, 2007. He has appeared at several Memphis wrestling shows, including the 2007 Ultimate Clash of the Legends. Leslie was a coach on Hulk Hogan's Celebrity Championship Wrestling.

On January 26, 2008, Leslie was inducted into the XWF Hall of Fame by Jack Blaze. After it became the LPW Hall of Fame, Blaze honored Beefcake again, on March 26, 2010, in Wheeling, West Virginia. On July 24, 2009, Leslie competed in "Celebrity Boxing 10" in Philadelphia, losing in the first round to local competitive eater Bill "El Wingador" Simmons. He took part in the Hulkamania: Let The Battle Begin tour in late 2009, wrestling across Australia, including Perth and Sydney.

On August 28, 2010, Beefcake wrestled for Dynamic Wrestling Alliance, based in Middletown, Ohio. On November 28, 2015, he participated in a match to be the #1 contender for the AML Title, which he lost. Being his last match to date, he quietly announced his retirement from professional wrestling.

In June 2016, Beefcake made appearances in Montana for the Big Time Wrestling event.

On April 6, 2019, Leslie was inducted into the WWE Hall of Fame class of 2019 by Hulk Hogan; he later acknowledged that the induction ceremony was the last time he ever spoke to Hogan. He made his first appearance on Boca Raton Championship Wrestling in 2022 and later in 2023, Leslie became a commissioner for BRCW.

== Other media ==
In 1994 Leslie had a recurring role on the action-adventure show Thunder in Paradise. In 1996 he played one of the Sumo Lab Assistant in the Christmas comedy film Santa with Muscles, he also an uncredited role in the 1997 film Body Armor. Leslie made multiple cameo appearance as one the jet skiers in the 1998 film McCinsey's Island, Bar Boy in The Ultimate Weapon. In 2000 he played Dr. Slade in an episode of Starhunter.

His wrestling career was later the subject of the 44th episode (fifth season and fourth episode) of the Dark Side of the Ring.

=== Filmography ===
Year	Film/show	Role	Note
1993	Mr. Nanny	Himself	
1994	Thunder in Paradise	Brutus	14 episodes
1996	Santa with Muscles	Sumo Lab Assistant	
1997	Body Armor	Henchman shot in helicopter	uncredited
1998	McCinsey's Island	Jet Skier 1 (as Leslie Edwards)	
1998	The Ultimate Weapon	Bar Boy / Big Boy	
1998	Hijack	Trigger happy henchman	uncredited
1999	Hitman’s Run	Henchman taken to custody	uncredited
1999	Whiteboyz	Garbage Man	uncredited
1999	Sanctimony	Huntsman	uncredited
2000	Starhunter	Dr. Slade	1 episode
2003	Grind	Nightclub Bouncer	uncredited

=== Video games ===
Year	Game	Note
1990	WWF WrestleMania Challenge	Video game debut
1998	WCW Nitro	
1999	WCW/nWo Thunder	
2004	WWE Day of Reckoning	
2004	WWE SmackDown! vs. Raw	
2009	WWE Legends of WrestleMania	
2014	WWE SuperCard	Mobile game
2016	WWE 2k17	
2017	WWE 2k18	
2018	WWE 2k19	
2019	WWE 2k20	

== Personal life ==
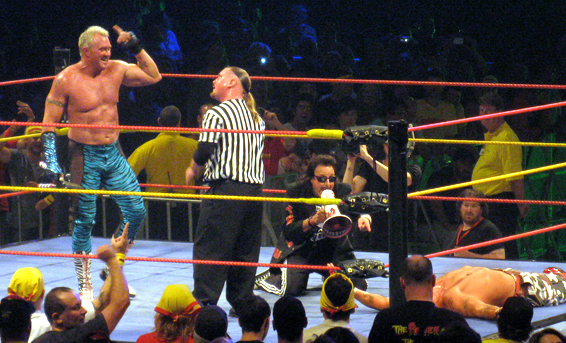
Beefcake on the Hulkamania Tour

Leslie was born and raised in Tampa Florida and would avidly attend wrestling shows in the area. He also played baseball growing up alongside Baseball Hall of Famer Wade Boggs.

Leslie married Kirsten Georgi on July 1, 1987. They divorced in 1991. He has a daughter, Alana, with Barbara McGondel, whom he married in 1993 but they divorced in 2009.

Leslie married Melissa DeGloria Caruso in 2014.

In February 2004, Leslie caused an anthrax scare at one of Boston's MBTA stations, Downtown Crossing, where he was working at the time. He had left a bag of cocaine in his booth, which a subway rider spotted and assumed to be anthrax. The building was evacuated as a precaution. Leslie checked into a drug rehabilitation facility after admitting that the cocaine was his.

Despite previously having a friendship with Hulk Hogan since they were children in grade school, they eventually had a falling out, and last spoke to each other in 2019. Leslie has claimed that the alleged incident which resulted in him cutting ties to Hogan, which allegedly involved Hogan hitting on his wife, actually occurred even before Hogan's racism scandal, with Leslie noting to The Hannibal TV in May 2025 that Hogan left the 2019 WWE Hall of Fame ceremony immediately after inducting him and was not in attendance for his hall of fame speech. Despite never speaking to him again, Leslie paid tribute to Hogan after he died and attended his funeral. By March 2026, however, he was again speaking negatively of Hogan.

== Championships and accomplishments ==
- Alabama Wrestling Federation
  - AWF Tag Team Championship (1 time) – with Greg Valentine
- Brew City Wrestling
  - BCW Tag Team Championship (1 time) – with Greg Valentine
- Championship Wrestling International
  - CWI Heavyweight Championship (1 time)
- Southeastern Championship Wrestling
  - NWA Southeastern Tag Team Championship (3 times) – with Ken Lucas (2), and Robert Fuller (1)
- International Wrestling Association
  - IWA Television Championship (1 time)
- Legends Pro Wrestling
  - XWF/LPW Hall of Fame Inductee- Class 2008 & 2010
- Maple State Wrestling/Slam All-Star Wrestling
  - MSW/SAW Tag Team Championship (1 time) – with Shane Williams
- New England Wrestling Alliance
  - NEWA Heavyweight Championship (1 time)
- World Wide Wrestling Alliance
  - WWWA Heavyweight Championship (1 time)
- World Wrestling Federation / WWE
  - WWF Tag Team Championship (1 time) – with Greg Valentine
  - WWE Hall of Fame (Class of 2019)
- Pro Wrestling Illustrated
  - PWI ranked him # 75 of the 500 top singles wrestlers in the PWI 500 in 1995.
  - PWI ranked him # 173 of the 500 best singles wrestlers of the "PWI Years" in 2003.
  - PWI ranked him # 94 of the 100 best tag teams of the "PWI Years" with Greg Valentine in 2003.

=== Lucha de Apuestas record ===
Winner (wager)	Loser (wager)	Location	Event	Date	Notes
Brutus Beefcake (hair)	Ron Bass (hair)	Tampa, Florida	Saturday Night's Main Event XIX	December 7, 1988	
