= The Honky Tonk Man =

American professional wrestler (born 1953)

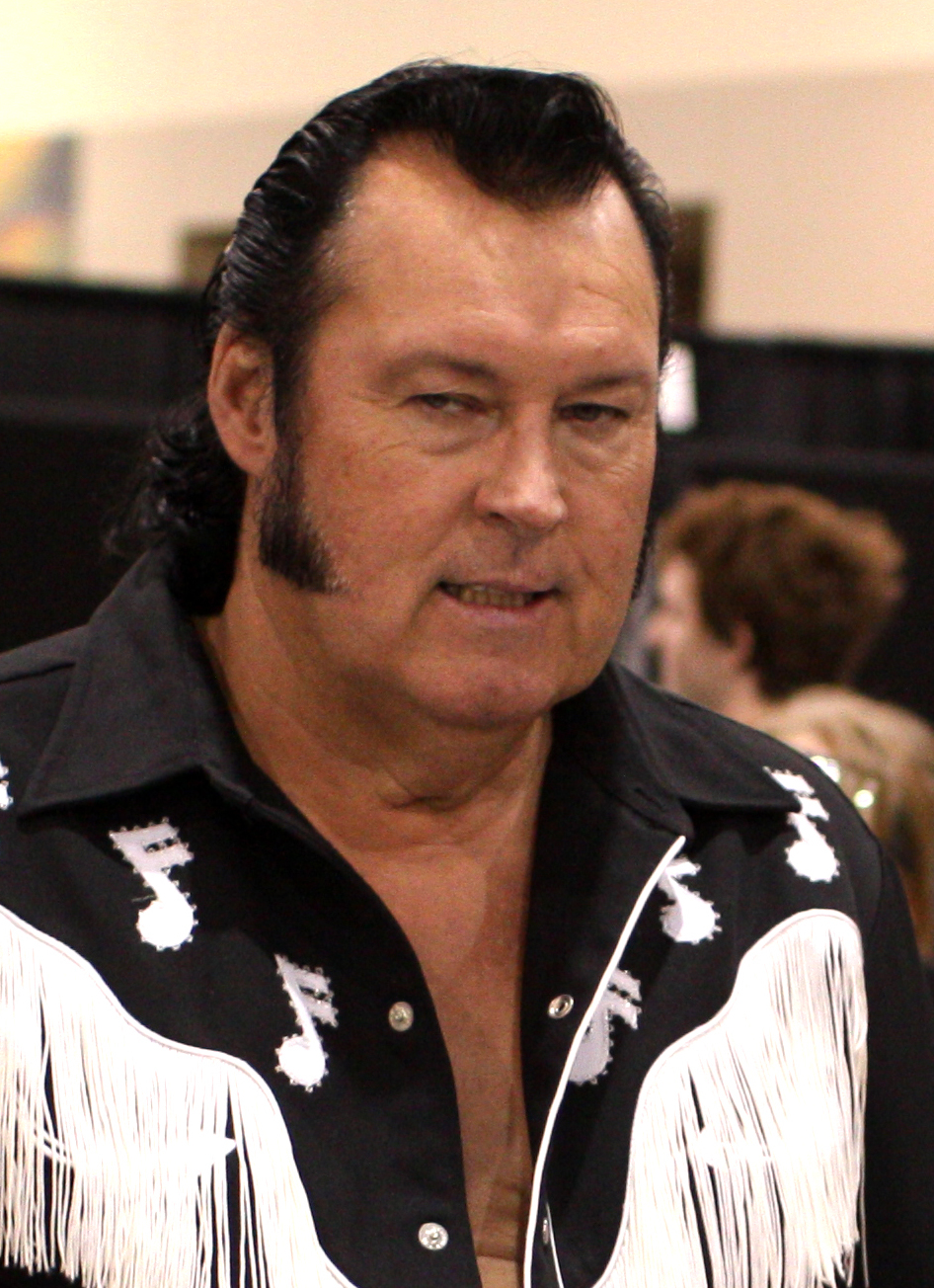
- Honky Tonk Man in 2012

Personal information
- Born: Roy Wayne Farris; January 25, 1953 (age 73) Bolivar, Tennessee, U.S.
- Spouses: Judy Nuckolls (m. 1975; div. 1980); Tammy Farris (m. 1984)
- Children: 2
- Family: Jerry Lawler (cousin); Brian Christopher (cousin once removed)

Professional wrestling career
- Ring name(s): Danny Condrey; Honky Tonk Wayne; The Honky Tonk Man; Wayne Farris
- Billed height: 6 ft 1 in (185 cm)
- Billed weight: 243 lb (110 kg)
- Billed from: Memphis, Tennessee
- Trained by: Herb Welch
- Debut: 1977
- Retired: 2019

Roy Wayne Farris (born January 25, 1953) is an American retired professional wrestler. He is best known for his tenure in the World Wrestling Federation (WWF, now WWE) from 1986 to 1991, where he performed under the ring name The Honky Tonk Man.

He also performed for World Championship Wrestling (WCW) in 1994, and for Stampede Wrestling between 1982 and 1986. He was inducted into the WWE Hall of Fame as part of the 2019 induction ceremony.

His 454-day reign as WWE Intercontinental Champion was the longest reign in the history of the title until it was broken by Gunther in 2023.

== Early life ==
Prior to becoming a wrestler Farris attended the University of Memphis and graduated with a BA in Education. Following his graduation he then began to work as a high school teacher and a football coach. Farris initially became interested in becoming a pro wrestler during his college years when some of his teammates on the weightlifting team started wrestling.

== Professional wrestling career ==
=== Early career (1977–1984) ===
Farris (left)

Farris began his career in 1977 working in Malden, Missouri and wrestled alongside his training partner Koko B. Ware for promoter Henry Rogers. Farris then moved on to Memphis Wrestling in 1978, originally working as a jobber to the stars. He wrestled frequently in Birmingham, Dothan, Mobile, and Pensacola as "Dynamite" Wayne Farris. He achieved greater success when he teamed with Larry Latham to form The Blond Bombers when they were put together by Jerry Brisco in Florida Championship Wrestling. The Bombers were later put with Sgt. Danny Davis as their manager when they came back to Memphis.

The Blond Bombers were involved in heated feuds with several fan favorite teams across the two competing Tennessee promotions, appearing in both Nick Gulas's Nashville based territory, and Jerry Jarrett's Memphis area. Their signature moment was the now famous "Tupelo Concession Stand Brawl" against Jerry Lawler and Bill Dundee. He then had stints in the American Wrestling Association (AWA), Jim Crockett Promotions, World Wrestling Council (WWC), Southeastern Championship Wrestling, Southwest Championship Wrestling, National Wrestling Alliance and Stampede Wrestling through the early 1980s, winning multiple singles and tag team championships in each. He won the NWA Southeastern Heavyweight Championship (Northern Division) in a tournament in 1984.

=== Stampede Wrestling (1982–1986) ===
Farris made his debut for Stampede Wrestling in Calgary in 1982 where the Honky Tonk Wayne gimmick was born. A spinoff of rock star Elvis Presley, he sported slicked-back hair, sideburns, and carried a guitar. Honky and Ron Starr won the Stampede Wrestling International Tag Team Championship in 1985 and 1986. He later teamed with Cuban Assassin to win the International Tag Team Championship. On June 20, 1986, he defeated Bad News Allen for the Stampede North American Heavyweight Championship; the title was vacated when Honky left for WWF in 1986.

=== World Wrestling Federation (1986–1991) ===
==== Early run (1986–1987) ====
Farris entered the World Wrestling Federation (WWF) in July 1986 under the ring name The Honky Tonk Man. Honky made his televised debut on the August 30, 1986 episode of The Body Shop (the last Body Shop interview segment conducted by Don Muraco), held on the final taping of All-Star Wrestling. Taped several days later, he was introduced to fans at the Mid-Hudson Civic Center by Junkyard Dog in the final episode of WWF Championship Wrestling, which also aired on August 30.

The WWF's introduction of the new character continued apace on their new clutch of syndicated programs that debuted that fall. On September 6, 1986, on the first episode of WWF Superstars, a promo aired from Honky where he declared that he would tap dance on the head of Paul Orndorff. Similar promos aired on following episodes of Superstars that month, as well as the new Wrestling Challenge syndicated program. Honky made his televised WWF debut on the September 28, 1986, episode of Wrestling Challenge, defeating Terry Gibbs. Originally pushed as a fan favorite wrestler with an Elvis impersonator gimmick, he was endorsed via an inset promo by none other than WWF World Heavyweight Champion Hulk Hogan himself. He made his debut on the house show circuit on October 8, 1986, defeating WWF Intercontinental Champion Randy Savage via disqualification in a match in Warren, Ohio. Wrestling as a fan-favorite, he competed against Randy Savage and Jake Roberts in subsequent matches. Honky received a televised match against Savage on October 18, 1986, in an encounter broadcast from Philadelphia, but lost by countout.

Fan support was lukewarm to hostile, and the company pivoted as Honky soon cut a series of promos with Jesse "The Body" Ventura that aired on the WWF's syndicated programming asking fans for a "vote of confidence". When he asked for the vote of confidence, he insulted fans in a way that resembled Andy Kaufman before him. On November 16 he wrestled Mr X (Danny Davis) in a match taped in Toronto for Prime Time Wrestling, with those in attendance firmly against him. On the November 22, 1986 episode of Superstars, the results predictably came back negative, and it was not long before Honky turned into a cocky villain and took on "Mouth of the South" Jimmy Hart (later billed "Colonel" as a reference to Elvis Presley's manager Colonel Tom Parker) as his manager.

Honky's first major feud came against Jake "The Snake" Roberts, who was in the midst of a fan favorite turn. The feud intensified when Honky attacked Roberts on his talk show set, The Snake Pit. According to Roberts, Honky was supposed to hit him with a gimmicked balsa wood guitar; he believes Farris accidentally grabbed a real, non-gimmicked guitar (made of fiberglass) and smashed it across Roberts' back, legitimately injuring him. According to Roberts, this started his dependence on prescription pain medication (in an interview, Roberts alleges that he was picking pieces of the guitar out of his back for weeks after he was hit). This has been disputed as Roberts had been a known drug user years before this incident. In an interview for World Wrestling Insanity, Honky disputed Roberts' assertion saying, "That's not true and, in fact I attribute most of that to Mick Foley, who wrote about it in his book, and Jake, who lied about it". Yet Roberts continued to wrestle regularly following this angle bringing into question the alleged non-gimmicked guitar shot. During their feud, which culminated at WrestleMania III, Honky grabbed the ring ropes to score a tainted win; afterward, Roberts cleared the ring of Honky before he and Alice Cooper attacked Hart with Damien, Roberts' python.

Following WrestleMania his feud with Jake Roberts was temporarily sidelined, with the newly returned Ken Patera substituting for the injured Roberts in multiple house show matches. For the first time since his WWF debut he was on the losing end of a feud, being pinned numerous times. On the May 18, 1987 episode of Prime Time Wrestling he suffered his first televised pinfall, losing again to Patera. On the June 8th episode of Prime Time he again loss by pinfall, this time to Billy Jack Haynes. On May 30 he again lost to Patera on Prime Time.

==== Intercontinental Heavyweight Champion (1987–1988) ====
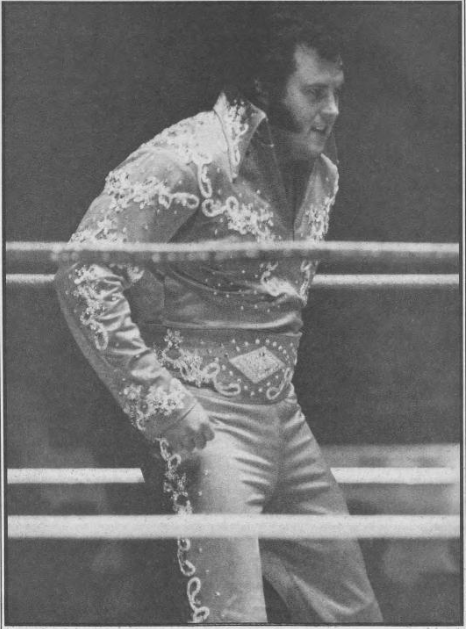
Honky Tonk Man, c. 1987

On the June 13, 1987, episode of Superstars, in Buffalo, New York, Honky defeated Ricky "The Dragon" Steamboat for the WWF Intercontinental Heavyweight Championship; Honky reversed Steamboat's inside cradle and grabbed onto the bottom ropes for extra leverage to get the pinfall win. Butch Reed was originally scheduled to win the title, but was a no show. Honky was originally meant to be a transitional champion to only hold on to the title for a short period of time, until Roberts failed several drug tests following WrestleMania and Honky was booked to remain champion for what would be a record-setting run. In a later interview, Honky remarked that Hulk Hogan, whom he then had a friendly, collaborative relationship with outside of the ring, had helped give Honky a chance at the title after a coincidental meeting between Hogan, Honky, and Vince McMahon took place. Hogan stuck up for Honky, even though McMahon had someone else in mind.

Honky Tonk Man (right) stomps on Randy Savage (bottom left), October 3, 1987

To preserve his title, which could only be taken by pinfall or submission, Honky often got himself deliberately counted out or disqualified against challengers such as Steamboat, Billy Jack Haynes, Bruno Sammartino, and George "The Animal" Steele. Also during this time, Honky began using a 50s-styled, themed entrance song performed by Farris (included on Piledriver: The Wrestling Album II, the WWF's second album of wrestling themes). By September 1987, "Macho Man" Randy Savage was in the midst of a fan favorite turn and began challenging Honky for the title (after Honky had made comments about himself being "the greatest Intercontinental Heavyweight Champion of all time" and making disparaging comments about former champions, particularly Savage). Although they had several matches beforehand – they had also met in 1986, when the then-villain Savage was champion and challenged by the fan favorite Honky – the first Savage-Honky match to air on national television was on the October 3, 1987 Saturday Night's Main Event XII, which was taped on September 23 in Hershey, Pennsylvania. During that match, Savage nearly defeated Honky until Honky's allies in Jimmy Hart's stable, The Hart Foundation (who had interfered throughout the match), ran into the ring and attacked Savage, getting Honky disqualified. Savage's manager, Miss Elizabeth, attempted to stop the attack on Savage, but Honky shoved her down and she fled to the locker room; meanwhile, Honky completed his attempt to break his guitar over Savage's head. Shortly thereafter, Miss Elizabeth returned with Savage's former rival, Hulk Hogan, who aided Savage in running off the heels (leading to the formation of The Mega Powers). Honky continued his bitter feud against Savage, as Honky would frequently make advances toward Miss Elizabeth – including one such incident at the 1987 Slammy Awards – to agitate his challenger. The last high-profile Savage-Honky match, aired as part of the undercard to Hulk Hogan vs. Andre the Giant on the 1988 The Main Event I, saw Honky lose by countout after Savage rammed him into the ring post on the outside of the ring. Their feud was blown off in the weeks before WrestleMania IV through a series of tag team-style steel cage matches, involving various allies of both Honky and Savage on their respective sides and Savage usually emerging victorious.

Honky retained the title in matches with Savage and Brutus "The Barber" Beefcake, Honky's next major rival. During the Beefcake-Honky feud – which began at WrestleMania IV (where Jimmy Hart got him disqualified by knocking out the referee with his megaphone while Beefcake had Honky in a sleeper hold, and this saw Honky retain the title, but Hart got a haircut from Beefcake himself) and continued during the spring and summer of 1988 – Honky vowed not to let Beefcake cut his ducktail hair, something Beefcake often said he would do in promos. In their matches, Honky was often seconded by a mysterious woman named Peggy Sue; while WWF Women's Champion Sherri Martel played the role for television tapings, more often than not, "Peggy Sue" was Jimmy Hart dressed in drag. Beefcake countered with a "woman" of his own: "Georgina" (George "The Animal" Steele in drag). Honky and Beefcake were scheduled to square off at the 1988 SummerSlam in what was billed as Beefcake's last shot at the now renamed Intercontinental Championship.

In a storyline twist, Beefcake was thrust in a feud with "Outlaw" Ron Bass after Bass committed a sneak attack on Beefcake; the incident was aired the weekend before SummerSlam. At the event, it was announced that a "mystery opponent" would face Honky for the title. When it came time for the match, Honky grabbed the microphone and proclaimed that he did not care who his opponent was. Ultimate Warrior then ran out and pinned his stunned opponent in just 31 seconds for the Intercontinental Championship, ending his reign at 454 days. Honky had been the champion for one year, two months, and 27 days (454 days total), which stood as the longest Intercontinental Championship reign until September 2023, when he was surpassed by Gunther.

==== Rhythm and Blues and departure (1989–1991) ====
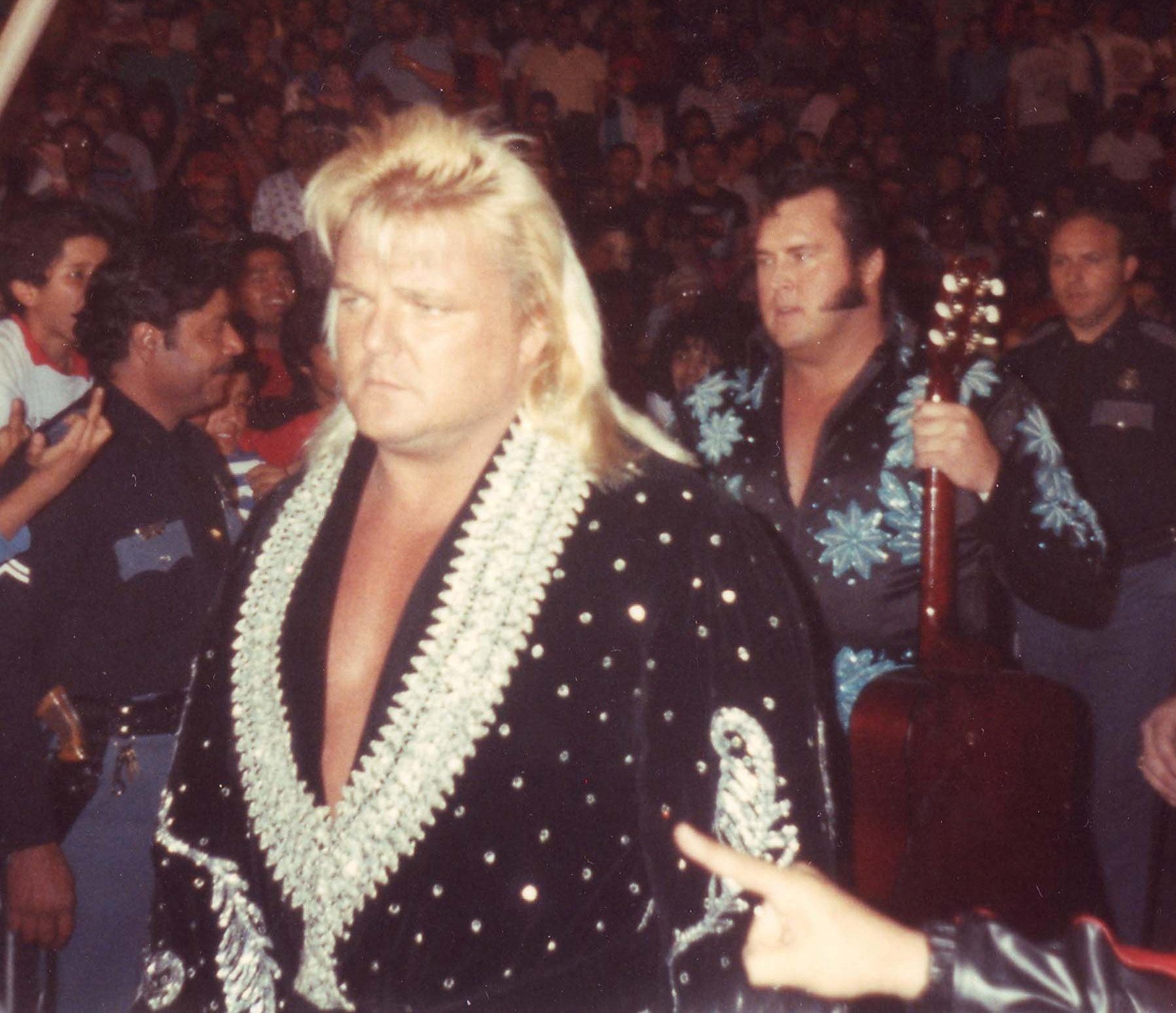
Honky Tonk Man (right) with his Rhythm and Blues tag team partner Greg Valentine on 7 March 1989 at the El Paso Convention Center

In 1989, Honky entered the Royal Rumble, where he was eliminated by Tito Santana and Bushwhacker Butch. In late 1989 and 1990, he and Greg Valentine, who was also managed by Jimmy Hart, aligned themselves as the tag team Rhythm and Blues in which Valentine became a Roy Orbison rip-off since Honky was an Elvis rip-off. At WrestleMania VI, they notably rode in a pink Cadillac, with future WWE Hall of Famer Diamond Dallas Page as the driver. After competing against such teams as The Hart Foundation at WrestleMania V and The Legion of Doom, Rhythm & Blues were part of Ted DiBiase's Million Dollar Team along with his "mystery" partner, the debuting Undertaker, against Rhodes' Dream Team of The Hart Foundation and Koko B. Ware at the 1990 Survivor Series, where they emerged victorious. Honky wrapped up his WWF career with a stint as a pro-villains color commentator alongside Vince McMahon and Roddy Piper on Superstars before leaving in January 1991.

=== Universal Wrestling Federation (1991) ===
Universal Wrestling Federation promoter Herb Abrams immediately set about signing Ferris to his growing roster of former WWF stars, adding to a burgeoning roster which also included recent signings Andre the Giant, Greg Valentine, and Rick Rude. He (as well as Rude and Valentine) made their debuts on the January 9, 1991 tapings of UWF Fury Hour. Appearing as The Honkytonk Man, Ferris did an in-ring segment with Captain Lou Albano where he was prevented from singing for the fans in attendance. The WWF filed a lawsuit claiming trademark to the Honkytonk Man character, with the segment subsequently not airing. This would also extend to Rick Rude and Greg Valentine, who would never actually appear on UWF television. Ferris left the promotion following a pay dispute with Abrams, and the latter refused to pay him or Valentine.

=== USWA and Independent circuit (1991–1994) ===
After leaving the UWF, Honky went the independent circuit. He wrestled his former partner Greg Valentine to a double disqualification for United Wrestling Alliance on February 19, 1991. He faced USWA Heavyweight Champion Jerry Lawler at the TWA Spring Spectacular 2 on May 18, 1991, losing via disqualification. Ferris next appeared for the TWA (Tri-State Wrestling Alliance), where he faced Paul Orndorff. He lost to Don Muraco at Century Toyota on June 28, 1992. Then he made a one night appearance on November 11, 1993, for United States Wrestling Association as he lost to Jeff Jarrett by disqualification.

=== World Championship Wrestling (1994) ===
On August 5, 1994, Ferris resurfaced in the Big Two, joining World Championship Wrestling and defeating Terry Taylor on WCW Worldwide. Promotional vignettes began airing for the former WWF star, and he next appeared on August 15, 1994, on WCW Pro with a win over Brad Armstrong. The Clash of The Champions special on August 24, 1994, featured the debut of his new song "Honky Dog Baby". Honky Tonk Man remained undefeated in WCW, defeating Mike Winner and Sam Houston. He began appearing on WCW's renewed house show circuit in October, defeating Brian Pillman in multiple encounters. On October 24, 1994, he appeared on his first WCW PPV, wrestling WCW World Television Champion Johnny B. Badd on Halloween Havoc in a match that went to a time limit draw.

Honky Tonk suffered his first WCW defeat on October 28, 1994, losing to Johnny B Badd at a house show in Tampa, Florida. This presaged several further defeats to Badd on the house show circuit; in the meantime it was announced he would face the WCW World Television Champion in a rematch at Starrcade. Honky Tonk remained undefeated on television, with his final match before the PPV coming on December 17 in a win over Steve Collins on WCW Worldwide. At Starrcade 94 he left the company due to a dispute with management. In his book Controversy Creates Cash, Eric Bischoff stated that his favorite firing was that of Honky. Honky has responded by saying that it was an honor, as Bischoff had fired a number of people while in WCW until he got himself fired.

=== Return to Independent Circuit (1995–1999) ===
After an unsuccessful stint with WCW, Honky returned to the indies. In 1995 he wrestled for the National Wrestling Conference having matches against former WWF stars Virgil, Ultimate Warrior, and Jake Roberts. He worked with them until 1998.

In 1996 he worked for American Wrestling Federation where he feuded with Koko B. Ware.

In 1998 he worked for Elite Canadian Championship Wrestling (ECCW) in British Columbia, Canada. On May 5, 1999, he wrestled Michael Hayes in a losing effort for SSOW.

=== Return to the WWF (1996–1998, 2001) ===
After a brief stint in the American Wrestling Federation, Honky resurfaced in the WWF on December 17, 1996, at a Monday Night Raw taping in Tampa, Florida. In a show that aired on December 29, Honky Tonk told the fans that he could not sing for the fans and instead provided color commentary. This would expand to commentary work on Raw Is War, WWF Superstars, and Shotgun Saturday Night, and then as the manager of Billy Gunn, who had started a singles run. Under Honky's tutelage, Gunn became known as "Rockabilly" in April 1997, which was a short-lived and unsuccessful gimmick and was also disliked by Honky himself. When Gunn formed the New Age Outlaws with Road Dogg in October 1997, Honky was taken off television. He then made an appearance in the 1998 Royal Rumble event eliminated by Vader.

Honky returned to the WWF for a one-time appearance at the 2001 Royal Rumble, but was quickly eliminated by Kane after being hit on the head with his guitar.

=== Later independent career (2000–2019) ===
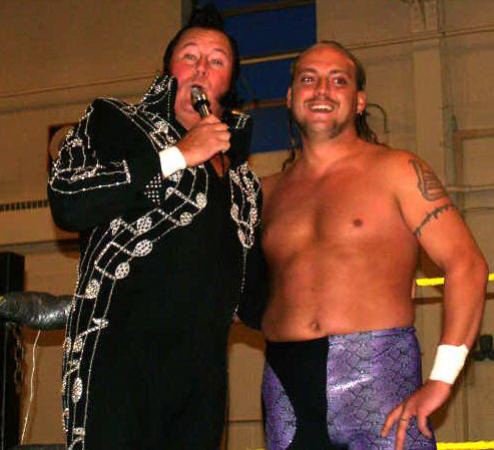
The Honky Tonk Man with Deven Michaels

Honky has worked independent wrestling shows all over the world. Honky, along with Ryan Smith and a host of others, ran a series of controversial wrestling websites from 2000 to 2006. TheHonkyTonkMan.com featured frequent updates from Honky himself, a highly interactive message board community, extensive photo gallery, audio updates, and more. Notable online feuds began between The Honky Tonk Man and Jerry Lawler, Roddy Piper, and others. These often intense online rivalries became a major drawing point for fans. The website unexpectedly closed without much explanation in December 2006. The site now forwards to various new ventures of former website manager Ryan Smith, who remains tight-lipped about the closing.

Honky has wrestled for Southern Championship Wrestling in Castroville, Texas, and MSW in eastern Canada. On April 23, 2008, Honky was seen wrestling in Presque Isle, Maine for the North Atlantic American Wrestling Association promotion. He appeared on Heavy on Wrestling on June 14, 2008, in Superior, Wisconsin. He wrestled as a fan favorite, defeating Big Brody Hoofer and hitting Cameron Steele with a guitar. He also appeared at PDX Wrestling (the new-age Portland Wrestling, run by Sandy Barr's son Josh) teaming with a local fan favorite against two villains.

On April 26, 2008, Honky was inducted into the XWF Hall of Fame by its creator Jack Blaze at their 2008 XWF Superbrawl event. XWF was later renamed LPW (Legends Pro Wrestling) where Honky is still honored in their Hall of Fame. On June 28, 2008, in Chicago Ridge, Illinois, he made a special guest appearance for Ring of Honor with the storyline that "Sweet N' Sour" Larry Sweeney had brought him on board with his Sweet N' Sour, Inc. faction. He praised the crowd and was about to sing and dance for them until Sweeney stepped in and told him he would not be doing either until their demands were met.

On July 27, 2008, Honky almost had the index finger of his right hand severed during a public appearance in Canada before an Ultimate Championship Wrestling show in Charlottetown, Prince Edward Island. He was making an appearance at Boston Pizza in Charlottetown several hours before the show when someone wanted to take a photo with him with both men clashing guitars. When the guitars collided, the neck of Honky's guitar turned and sliced into Honky's finger, almost severing it. Honky was immediately taken to Queen Elizabeth Hospital where doctors stitched the finger and bandaged it. Honky made his appearance at the Ultimate Championship Wrestling show several hours later. He was unable to wrestle his scheduled match due to the injury and was replaced by Trash Canyon, whom he managed from ringside. Honky, although injured and in obvious pain, sang his theme song twice in the ring.

In August 2008, Honky appeared at Wrestling Supershows across Canada. Honky also made appearances in SWCW in Oklahoma City, Oklahoma. On October 24, 2008, he wrestled for Big Time Wrestling (his first match in four months), beating L'Empereur. On January 7, 2009, he appeared in a World Pro Wrestling event in Colusa, California, teaming with Doink The Clown (a new masked version) to face WPW World Tag Team Champions The First Class Express, Jerry Grey and Mighty Henrich. The match ended in a no contest as Doink turned on Honky and the three triple-teamed him. On May 7, 2009, Honky and Bushwacker Luke defeated "Kowboy" Mike Hughes and "Wildman" Gary Williams for the UCW Tag Team Championship. On January 31, 2011, Honky made his Dynamic Wrestling Alliance debut defeating Col. Jonathan James at the "Golden Opportunity II" event in Middletown, Ohio.

On June 5, 2016, Honky wrestled in Impact Pro Wrestling in New Zealand, at the Armageddon Expo in Wellington. He teamed up with Brook Duncan and Britenay to defeat the team of the IPW New Zealand Heavyweight Champion Curt Chaos, Taylor Adams and Mr. Burns.

Honky made a cameo appearance in the first episode of season 3 of Lucha Underground, appearing as a prison warden returning Dario Cueto's things upon his release.

=== Third return to WWE (2008–2019) ===
==== Sporadic appearances (2008–2013) ====
In 2008, Santino Marella announced his intention to break Honky's record for longest Intercontinental Championship reign, usually displaying a special "Honk-a-meter" comparing Honky's 64-week record with the length of his own reign at the time. On the October 6 episode of Raw, Honky (now a fan favorite for the first time since 1986), along with Goldust and Roddy Piper, was named as one of the possible opponents for Marella's Intercontinental Championship at Cyber Sunday. He was elected by fans to challenge for the title with 35% of the vote; despite concern that his injured finger might require surgery, he did appear, winning the match by disqualification (thus failing to win the title). After the match had ended, Goldust and Piper came down to the ring and, along with Honky, attacked Marella. On the October 27 episode of Raw, Honky appeared as a special guest commentator. After an impersonation of Marella's on-screen girlfriend, Beth Phoenix, Charlie Haas was knocked into the announcer table, and Marella attacked Honky, prompting Piper and Goldust to block Marella's escape from the ring. Upon Goldust's entry to the ring, Marella turned around to be smashed over the head by Honky's guitar.

Honky inducted Koko B. Ware into the WWE Hall of Fame on April 4, 2009.

In 2010, WWE offered him a place in the WWE Hall of Fame, but he rejected it. Honky made a brief appearance on Old School Raw on March 4, 2013. Following a match between the team of Brodus Clay and Tensai and 3MB, he smashed 3MB member Heath Slater over the head with a guitar. He then danced with Clay and Tensai to his signature "Cool, Cocky, Bad" theme song.

==== Hall of Fame (2019) ====
On February 26, 2019, WWE confirmed that the Honky Tonk Man would join the WWE Hall of Fame class of 2019. He was inducted on April 7, 2019, by his former manager Jimmy Hart.

== Professional wrestling persona ==
After initially debuting as a face Honky spent the majority of his career as a heel after negative fan reaction. He went on to excel in a heel role being known for his ability to garner heat from the fans by using his cockiness and arrogance. Bleacher Report described him as "a despicable villain, a cowardly type with a big mouth who rarely backed up anything he said. And therein lies the genius of the performer himself: He was so over-the-top in his proclamations and so confident in his abilities that by the time he wormed his way out of another match with his title, surviving via countout or disqualification rather than pinfall, fans were ready to beat him up themselves."

For his appearance Honky had the look of an Elvis Presley impersonator with long sideburns, slick hair, a jumpsuit and his signature guitar which he would often use as a weapon. He later stated that he got the name for the gimmick from the 1956 Johnny Horton song "Honky-Tonk Man". For his signature move Honky used the Shake, Rattle, and Roll which was a swinging neckbreaker.

== Other media ==
Honky appeared in the coin operated arcade game WWF Superstars which debuted in 1989. Honky appeared in an episode of the court based show Judge Jeanine Pirro as a witness to the defendant; the episode, which aired on October 11, 2010, was also the highest rated show for Judge Jeanine Pirro of all time. Honky appeared in the video game WWE All Stars as a free downloadable character. He also has appeared in WWE 2K15 as part of a downloadable content pack and is in WWE 2K16 as an unlockable character from the special objectives. His most recent video game appearance is in WWE 2K26 In the game's Ringside Pass, he appears in the free pass at tier 8 for Ringside Pass #1. He was cast in John Wesley Norton's film Executive Ranks. Honky also appeared in Insane Clown Posse's music video for "How Many Times" along with The Bushwhackers and his former tag team partner Greg Valentine. He played Cato in the 2025 film Midnight Massacre.

== Personal life ==
Farris' first marriage to Judy Lynn Nuckolls was brief, but he has been married to his current wife Tammy since 1984, they have two children together. He has lived in Gilbert, Arizona since June 1993.

== Championships and accomplishments ==
- All Pro Wrestling
  - APW Universal Heavyweight Championship (1 time)
- Big Time Wrestling
  - BTW Heavyweight Championship (1 time)
- Cauliflower Alley Club
  - Men's Wrestling Award (2011)
- Hardcore Wrestling Federation
  - HWF Heavyweight Championship (1 time)
- International Championship Wrestling
  - ICW Heavyweight Championship (1 time)
- International Wrestling Alliance
  - IWA Heavyweight Championship (1 time)
- Legends Pro Wrestling
  - XWF/LPW Hall of Fame (class of 2008)
- Mid-Eastern Wrestling Federation
  - MEWF Heavyweight Championship (1 time)
- Mid-South Wrestling Association
  - MSWA Tennessee Heavyweight Championship (1 time)
- NWA Mid-America/Continental Wrestling Association
  - AWA Southern Tag Team Championship (4 times) – with Larry Latham (3) and Tojo Yamamoto (1)
  - NWA Mid-America Tag Team Championship (3 times) – with Larry Latham
- North Atlantic Wrestling Association
  - NAWA Tag Team Championship (1 time) – with Paul Hudson
- Northern States Wrestling Alliance
  - NSWA Tag Team Championship (1 time) – with Greg Valentine
- Pro Wrestling Illustrated
  - Ranked No. 159 of the top 500 singles wrestlers in the PWI 500 in 1992
- Ring Masters Entertainment
  - RME Heavyweight Championship (1 time)
  - RME Tag Team Championship (1 time) - with Bobby Collins
- Southeastern Championship Wrestling
  - NWA Alabama Heavyweight Championship (1 time)
  - NWA Southeastern Heavyweight Championship (Northern Division) (1 time)
  - NWA Southeastern Tag Team Championship (1 time) – with Ron Starr
  - NWA Southeastern United States Junior Heavyweight Championship (1 time)
- Stampede Wrestling
  - Stampede International Tag Team Championship (3 times) – with Ron Starr (2) and The Cuban Assassin (1)
  - Stampede North American Heavyweight Championship (1 time)
- Ultimate Championship Wrestling
  - UCW Tag Team Championship (1 time) – with Bushwhacker Luke
- Ultimate Championship Wrestling (Virginia)
  - UCW Heavyweight Championship (1 time)
- Universal Wrestling Association
  - UWA Heavyweight Championship (1 time)
- World Class Professional Big Time Wrestling
  - WCPBTW Ohio Tag Team Championship (1 time) - with Bobby Fulton
- World Wrestling Council
  - WWC Caribbean Heavyweight Championship (1 time)
- World Wrestling Federation/WWE
  - WWF Intercontinental Heavyweight Championship (1 time)
  - WWE Hall of Fame (Class of 2019)
