= Dream Team (professional wrestling) =

- Brutus Beefcake (left), Greg Valentine (right)

Tag team
- Members: Brutus Beefcake (1985–1987); Greg Valentine; Dino Bravo (1987)
- Name(s): Dream Team; New Dream Team
- Billed heights: 6 ft 3 in (1.91 m) – Beefcake; 6 ft 0 in (1.83 m) – Valentine; 6 ft 1 in (1.85 m) – Bravo
- Combined billed weight: 520 lb (240 kg) (Dream Team); 491 lb (223 kg) (New Dream Team)
- Debut: 1985
- Disbanded: 2013

The Dream Team was a World Wrestling Federation tag team from 1985 to March 29, 1987 consisting of Brutus Beefcake and Greg Valentine managed by "Luscious" Johnny Valiant. The New Dream Team, also managed by Johnny Valiant, saw Dino Bravo replace Brutus Beefcake and competed from March 1987 until the winter of 1988.

== History ==
Prior to creation of the Dream Team, Greg Valentine, managed by Captain Lou Albano, had won the WWF Intercontinental Championship from Tito Santana and was in the middle of a brutal feud with Santana. In the midst of that feud Jimmy Hart took over Albano's managing duties while Valentine was still the champion. Brutus Beefcake had entered the WWF in 1984 under the management of Johnny Valiant.

=== The Dream Team (1985-1987) ===
Managers Johnny Valiant and Jimmy Hart first put Greg Valentine and Brutus Beefcake together in May 1985. Early on Beefcake teamed with Valentine to fight off Tito Santana and the Junkyard Dog, both high ranked contenders for Valentine's Intercontinental title. In Toronto's Maple Leaf Gardens on April 21, 1985 the Dream Team lost to Santana and Ricky Steamboat in approximately 15 minutes. The match appears on the WWF's Coliseum Home Video release "Best of the WWF Vol. 4". On July 6, 1985 Santana regained the Intercontinental Title in a steel cage match and shortly afterwards the Dream Team set their sights on the reigning WWF World Tag Team champions, The U.S. Express (Barry Windham and Mike Rotunda).

Not long after Johnny Valiant became the sole manager of the Dream Team as the two started to team more and more regularly. Their initial shots at the tag team champions were unsuccessful but on August 24 at The Spectrum in Philadelphia the Dream Team won the tag team titles from the U.S. Express when Beefcake (storyline) rubbed Luscious Johnny's lit cigar in Windham's eye.

Immediately after their title win, the Dream Team were challenged by The British Bulldogs (Davey Boy Smith and the Dynamite Kid), often escaping with their titles due to underhanded means. Besides defending against the Bulldogs the Dream Team also put the gold on the line against such teams as The Killer Bees as well as the former champions the US Express (both versions). The Bulldogs remained a constant threat to the Dream Team as 1985 turned to 1986, finally the Dream Team agreed to give the Bulldogs one final tag team title shot at WrestleMania 2. On April 7, 1986 the two teams met in the Chicago section of WrestleMania broadcast from the Rosemont Horizon, with the addition of "Prince of Darkness" Ozzy Osbourne in the Bulldogs’ corner the Dream Team finally ran out of tricks and lost the gold.

Finding themselves in the challengers position the Dream Team now chased the Bulldogs in the months following WrestleMania 2 climaxing in a series of steel cage matches during the summer of 1986. A running gag on the WWF's weekly television was Gorilla Monsoon's constant suggestion that the Dream Team never mentally got over the loss at WrestleMania 2, likely in acknowledgement of what many consider the best match on the card that night. Gorilla would always make a point to mention it happened in Chicago's Rosemont Horizon, the location Gorilla himself was stationed at for the event. As the summer passed the Dream Team found themselves facing the Killer Bees and the second version of the US Express instead of challenging for the gold. As 1986 turned to 1987 the Dream Team found themselves feuding with The Fabulous Rougeaus (Jaques and Raymond). The team was also joined by Johnny Valiant's newest addition Dino Bravo in six-man tag matches. Lack of championship success, not to mention Beefcake feeling muscled out by Bravo, began tension within the team.

At WrestleMania III the Dream Team and the Rougeaus clashed once again with the Dream Team winning due to Dino Bravo's interference. After the match Dino Bravo and Greg Valentine argued with Brutus Beefcake, kicking him off the team.

=== The New Dream Team (1987-1988, 1989) ===
The New Dream Team w/ manager Johnny V

After dumping Beefcake, Valentine and Bravo began wrestling as "The New Dream Team", starting out strong by defeating The Islanders in a series of house show matches after which they continued the long running feud with the Rougeau brothers splitting matches between them over the summer, often in six man matches with Beefcake joining the Rougeaus to take on Valentine, Bravo and Valiant. The Dream Team also had a couple of shots at the world tag team champions The Hart Foundation (Bret Hart and Jim Neidhart), but did not manage to repeat the success of the original Dream Team.

The New Dream Team's last major appearance as a team was at the inaugural Survivor Series where they took part in a ten team, tag team elimination match. Valentine was pinned by Paul Roma of the Young Stallions, eliminating the team from the match.

After Survivor Series the New Dream Team broke up quietly, they simply stopped teaming up and went their separate ways. One of the main reasons for this split was because Valentine and Bravo legitimately did not get along outside the ring. Johnny Valiant left the WWF, Greg Valentine began working as a singles wrestler reuniting with Jimmy Hart, and Dino Bravo came under the guidance of Frenchy Martin.

Valentine and Bravo would later be teammates in Randy Savage's King's Court team at the Survivor Series (1989), by which time Bravo had joined Valentine under Hart's management. That same night, Beefcake would appear in a different Dream Team, captained by Dusty Rhodes. Valentine and Bravo would also later team up again up against The Rockers on a WWF VHS tape called WWF Supertape, Volume 2 in 1990.

Bravo left the WWF in 1992 after he retired from the sport. Beefcake was released by the company in 1993 and went to WCW. Valentine left the company in 1992 and went to WCW. He returned to WWF in 1993 and left in 1994 and went back to WCW.

=== Reunion (2003–2013) ===
Valentine and Beefcake reunited for the first time in 16 years on November 1, 2003 defeating The Powers Of Pain at The Road Warrior Hawk Memorial Show. Then they lost to Hacksaw Jim Duggan and Tito Santana at the debut of Power Wrestling Alliance on November 11, 2005 in Dix Hills, New York. On November 9, 2007 they won the BCW Tag Team Championship for Brew City Wrestling defeating Brandon Tatum and Dinn T. Moore. The titles were dropped as they lost to Hardcore Craig and Steve Stone on January 12, 2008. They continued wrestling in the independent circuit. On July 20, 2013 they won the AWF Tag Team Titles and later that year split up.

=== Aftermath ===
Bravo was murdered on March 10, 1993 at his home in Laval, Quebec at 44. Valiant died after being hit by a car on April 4, 2018.

After 2013, Beefcake retired from wrestling in 2015 and Valentine retired from wrestling in 2019.

Valentine was inducted in the WWE Hall of Fame in 2004 and Beefcake was inducted in 2019.

== Championships and accomplishments ==
- Alabama Wrestling Federation
  - AWF Tag Team Championship (1 Time)
- Brew City Wrestling
  - BCW Tag Team Championship (1 time)
- 'Pro Wrestling Illustrated'
  - Ranked # 94 of the 100 best Tag teams during the "PWI" years in 2003.
- World Wrestling Federation
  - WWF Intercontinental Heavyweight Championship (1 time) - Valentine
  - WWF World Tag Team Championship (1 time)
