= Honky Tonk Man =

Honky Tonk Man may refer to:

- The Honky Tonk Man, ring name of professional wrestler Wayne Farris
- Honkytonk Man, 1982 American film starring Clint Eastwood
- Honky Tonk Man (album), 1975 album by country singer Steve Young
- "Honky-Tonk Man", 1956 country song by Johnny Horton, also covered by Bob Luman and Dwight Yoakam
