= Midget wrestling =

Professional wrestling genre

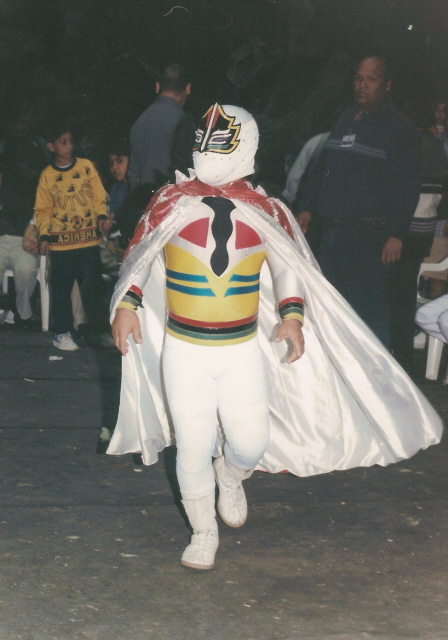
Mascarita Sagrada on his way to the ring

Midget wrestling is professional wrestling involving people of exceptionally short stature. Its heyday was in the 1950s and 1960s, when wrestlers such as Little Beaver and Lord Littlebrook toured North America, and Sky Low Low was the first holder of the National Wrestling Alliance's World Midget Championship. In the following couple of decades, more wrestlers became prominent in North America, including foreign wrestlers like Japan's Little Tokyo.

The attraction was very popular in wrestling promotions from the 1950s into the 1970s. Many cards included midget wrestlers and included tag team and women's midget wrestling. Television shows for promotions in various cities frequently included midget matches.

Midget wrestling began to wane after WWF's WrestleMania III. Afterward, promotions continued to feature midget divisions, but its popularity was slowly declining. By the mid-1990s, midget wrestlers mostly appeared in comical matches and segments, rather than serious competitive wrestling-type matches. In Mexico, this was not the case, as wrestler Mascarita Sagrada continued to compete in prominent Mexican promotions such as AAA and Consejo Mundial de Lucha Libre. By the mid-2000s in the United States, midget divisions once again were part of major wrestling promotions, and wrestlers such as WWE's Hornswoggle were competing for and winning championships made for average-size male wrestlers.

The Little People of America (LPA) have criticized midget wrestling as reinforcing stereotypes that little people are no more than entertainment, and the use of the word "midget", stating that it is as offensive as a slur. Opinions on the term from performers competing in the events is mixed; some consider the term merely descriptive of their small size, and others considering it outdated or offensive.

== United States and Canada ==
=== Early history ===
Midget professional wrestling had its early origins in the vaudeville shows of the United States. In these shows, comedy was as important as athletics. The sport is also indebted to professional wrestling's carny origins, where a premium was placed on the visually unusual.

=== Heyday ===
In 1949, Sky Low Low won a thirty-man battle royal to become the winner of the first NWA World Midget Championship, a singles midget championship promoted by the National Wrestling Alliance. Sky Low Low, one of the most prominent midget professional wrestlers, had a longtime feud with Farmer Brooks.

The 1950s have been called the "golden age of midget wrestling". During the decade, Sky Low Low, Little Beaver, Lord Littlebrook, and Fuzzy Cupid all toured the territories of Canada, wrestling in promotions such as Stu Hart's Stampede Wrestling. The dominant promoter and booker for midget wrestling at the time was Jack Britton, who was stationed in Montreal, Quebec. In Ontario, Larry Kasaboski also promoted midget wrestling shows. In Canada, Sky Low Low and Little Beaver earned up to 15% of the gate proceeds at their events.

The midget professional wrestlers had many gimmicks to attract audiences and revenue. One of Sky Low Low's gimmicks was an open challenge to any other midget professional wrestlers to beat him in a two out of three falls match for $100. He often turned himself upside down and balanced on his head. The duo of Sky Low Low and Little Beaver even squared off in a match for Elizabeth II and King Farouk of Egypt. Sky Low Low also frequently teamed with Fuzzy Cupid in tag team matches. Meanwhile, Lord Littlebrook was credited as being one of the first wrestlers of any height to use aerial maneuvers in his matches. In addition to North America, Littlebrook wrestled in Australia, Japan, and Thailand. The midget wrestlers also performed in Cuba (prior to 1959), South America, Central America, England, Ireland, Scotland, and the countries on the mainland European continent.

In the 1960s, Littlebook trained other midget wrestlers, including Cowboy Lang. Female wrestler the Fabulous Moolah also trained midget wrestlers at her home in South Carolina, including female midget wrestler Diamond Lil.

Female midget wrestlers were popular in the 1960s and 1970s. Beginning in the mid-to-late 1960s, Diamond Lil wrestled Darling Dagmar, and in the 1970s, Lil mainly feuded with Princess Little Dove. Other prominent female competitors included Sheila Johnson, Cherrie Lamour, and Gypsey Rose. The women, as well as the men, competed regularly for promotions such as Georgia Championship Wrestling.

=== Peak and decline ===
Midget wrestling continued to be popular into the 1970s and 1980s, with foreign wrestlers coming to the United States to compete. Little Tokyo, a Japanese professional wrestler, made his way to the National Wrestling Alliance in the 1970s. British wrestler Lord Littlebrook continued to compete, but he became a manager for Jack Victory and Rip Morgan in World Championship Wrestling in the late 1980s.

The World Wrestling Federation included several midget wrestlers on their cards in the 1980s. At WrestleMania II in April 1986, the Haiti Kid appeared in the corner of actor Mr. T, who was in a match against wrestling Roddy Piper. On March 12, 1987, the WWF's WrestleMania III event — which is considered the pinnacle of the 1980s wrestling boom — included a tag team match with midget wrestlers Haiti Kid and Little Beaver, with average sized wrestler Hillbilly Jim defeating Little Tokyo and Lord Littlebrook, with King Kong Bundy by disqualification. During the match, Bundy slammed Little Beaver to the mat, which broke his back and forced him into early retirement. Sky Low Low was also touring with the WWF in the 1980s.

Promotions such as World Class Championship Wrestling and Windy City Wrestling also had midget divisions during this time. Grand Prix Wrestling in Canada employed midget wrestlers, including Farmer Brooks until it closed in 1992. In late 1992, Canadian Claude Giroux signed on with the WWF and teamed with the Bushwhackers in their feud against the Beverly Brothers, both of which were teams of full-sized wrestlers.

Competitive midget wrestling declined sharply in the United States in the early 1990s. Midget wrestlers began to show up in more comedic roles, which has been criticized by the Little People of America as being "thoroughly degrading and puts little people out there as a sideshow and entertainment". In these comedic roles, the wrestlers appeared as miniature versions of existing full-size wrestling stars. For example, Claude Giroux continued his tenure in the WWF by dressing up as a smaller version of larger wrestlers; most prominent was his Dink the Clown character, who was the "mini" of Doink the Clown. As Dink, Giroux appeared at 1994's WrestleMania X in a match where he teamed with Doink against Bam Bam Bigelow and Luna Vachon. He made another appearance at that year's Survivor Series, teaming with Doink and two other midget wrestlers (Pink and Wink) in a match against Jerry Lawler and Lawler's "minis" (Sleazy, Queasy, and Cheesy). In response to the growing popularity of using midget wrestlers as comedy, Lord Littlebrook, who was popular in the 1950s, stated, "I'm disgusted, I really am...I want midget wrestling, I don't want midget comedy."

=== Resurgence ===
In the late 1990s, the WWF and Mexico's AAA had a talent sharing program that allowed several lucha libre midget wrestlers to compete on WWF television. These wrestlers included Max Mini, El Torito, Mascarita Sagrada, Mini Vader, and La Parkita. Like in the United States, these midget wrestlers played "mini" versions of WWF and AAA's full-size wrestlers. Sagrada, repackaged as a character named Nova, made his in-ring debut in a midget wrestling match at Bad Blood in 1997 where he teamed with Max Mini against Tarantula and Mosaic. The midget wrestlers appeared on WWF Shotgun Saturday Night and WWF Monday Night Raw. The WWF's midget wrestlers also appeared in matches at the Royal Rumble in 1997 and the Royal Rumble in 1998.

World Championship Wrestling (WCW) also had an influx of Mexican midget wrestlers. In late 1996, full-size wrestler Máscara Sagrada wrestled in a dark match before Starrcade in 1996 where he teamed with Octagóncito (mini version of Octagón) and defeated Jerrito Estrada and Piratita Morgan, the latter of which was also a little person. The next day, the teams faced again, this time on WCW Monday Nitro.

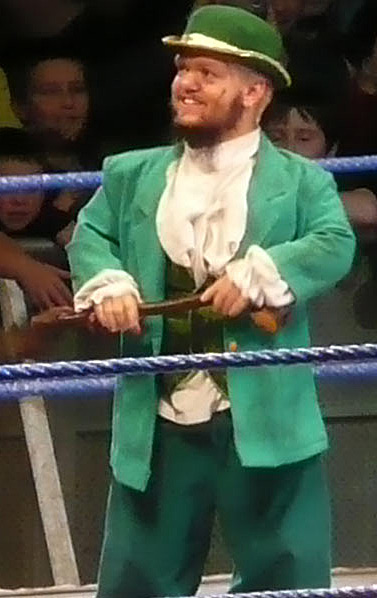
Hornswoggle in World Wrestling Entertainment in 2007

On the independent circuit, there was an increased interest in midget hardcore wrestling matches, and groups such as the Half Pint Brawlers began selling DVDs and opening for musical acts such as Kid Rock. World Wrestling All-Stars also included hardcore matches in 2002 through 2003, with performers such as Meatball, Teo, and Puppet competing in matches where they hit each other with trashcans and other foreign objects. In the early days of Total Nonstop Action Wrestling (NWA:TNA) in 2002, the promotion included a hardcore midget wrestling division. Although the division was later abandoned, at Victory Road in 2004—the company's first monthly pay-per-view event—Mascarita Sagrada defeated Piratita Morgan.

In 2005, World Wrestling Entertainment (WWE) announced the creation of a "juniors" division within their SmackDown! brand, which consisted of wrestlers at or below five feet tall, but it was discontinued in March 2006. Despite releasing many of the "junior" talent, they hired Dylan Postl in May 2006, who played a leprechaun character (named Little Bastard and later Hornswoggle), who accompanied Northern Irish wrestler Fit Finlay to the ring. At the Great American Bash in July 2007, he won the WWE Cruiserweight Championship, a title normally held by full size male wrestlers. Finlay and Hornswoggle also challenged for the WWE Tag Team Championship at Night of Champions in June 2008. During his tenure with the company, midget wrestlers employed in the independent circuit, including Short Sleeve Sampson, were brought in to portray the mini versions of larger wrestlers with whom Finlay was feuding.

In February 2000, the Micro Wrestling Federation (MWF), a wrestling promotion made up entirely of little people, was established. The promotion featured both serious wrestling matches and more comedic aspects. In early 2008, the Entertainment Shack booking agency acquired the MWF. After the acquisition, the entertainment agency hired many new midget wrestlers, making the organization the largest midget wrestling show in the US. This show can be seen nationwide with a tour schedule that encompasses the entire US, Canada, and South America. The promotion usually books between 150 and 180 shows a year.

In the 21st century, there has been substantial controversy surrounding the sport. The hardcore wrestling troupe the Half Pint Brawlers simulated sex, used staple guns as weapons, and performed using other hardcore antics in January 2008 during a Delta Upsilon fraternity event at Northwestern University. The event caused the fraternity to face disciplinary actions. In August 2008, the female performers in the MWF caused a disturbance when they appeared topless in a bar in Canton, Illinois. In addition, the Little People of America began to frown upon the use of the word "midget" in 2007, considering it to be degrading. The wrestlers involved in the sport do not always agree with this assessment, citing the longevity of the sport and the appeal of the term to audiences.

In 2018, Texas-based organization Extreme Dwarfanators Wrestling, which has toured across the US for many years, decided to tour England and Wales in the UK due to the explosion of interest in the UK wrestling scene. They instructed Wales-based agency Degu Media to assist with the language, tone, and translational issues and began to eliminate the word "midget" from all UK marketing material. At launch, the word Dwarfanators was substituted on social media, posters, advertisements, and banners. The Restricted Growth Association (RGA) opposed the event and describing it as a "freak show". The RGA's statement offended many in the wrestling community. Such notables in the Dwarf community such as James Luster (actor, former dwarf games participant, and councilor) spoke out against the organization, including former relatives of the founders of the RGA. Once three venues in England banned the dwarfs from appearing, a legal case for discrimination was started, quoting the Equality Act 2010. Coyote Ugly Saloons in the UK briefly suspended ticket sales while they took counsel on the matter, then gave the events their support.

In 2022, Major League Wrestling announced the creation of a midget division.

== Mexico ==
Mascarita Sagrada is the most popular midget wrestler in Mexico and has also been featured in World Wrestling Entertainment and World Championship Wrestling in the United States. In Mexico, he has competed in AAA, Consejo Mundial de Lucha Libre (CMLL), and a long list of independent promoters over the years. He debuted in CMLL, where he was patterned after popular luchador Máscara Sagrada and given his ring name which is Spanish for "Little Sacred Mask". During his first year working as Mascarita Sagrada he made guest appearances in Puerto Rico working for the World Wrestling Council (WWC) at their 17th Anniversary show teaming with Aguilita Solitaria in a losing effort against the team of Piratita Morgan and Espectrito. This match was one of the early pairings of Mascarita Sagrada and Espectrito, a rivalry that lasted for a decade and spanned several promotions.

In the 1990s, when midget wrestling in the United States began to decline in popularity, it remained popular in Mexico. In fact, prominent Mexican promotion Consejo Mundial de Lucha Libre (CMLL) created their midget division the year before in 1989. In 1992, the promotion established its primary championship for midget wrestlers, the CMLL World Mini-Estrella Championship. Mascarita Sagrada was the first champion.

Mascarita Sagrada and Espectrito continued their feud in AAA, now with the newly created Mexican National Mini-Estrella Championship in the 1990s. In January 1994, Espectrito became the first champion after winning a tournament final. In November 1994 Sagrada and Octagoncito teamed up to defeat Espectrito and Jerrito Estrada on AAA's first pay-per-view event When Worlds Collide. In 2002, AAA established the AAA Mascot Tag Team Championship, which was a tag team championship that was held by a full-size wrestler and his "mini". The initial champions were Mascara Sagrada and Mascarita Sagrada, who held the title for approximately two years before losing it to El Alebrije and Cuije. The latter team held the championship until April 7, 2009 when they left the promotion and the title was vacated.

== Championships and Accomplishments ==
Sky Low Low (Marcel Gauthier) who was the National Wrestling Alliance's first World Midget Champion, Little Beaver (Lionel Giroux), Lord Littlebrook, and Fuzzy Cupid all have been inducted into the Professional Wrestling Hall of Fame. In addition, other awards were developed for the midget professional wrestlers. For example, Pro Wrestling Illustrated presented a Midget Wrestler of the Year award annually from 1972 to 1976.

The National Wrestling Alliance promoted the NWA World Midget's Championship from 1949 until 1999. Little Tokyo held the title more than any other wrestler, with a total of three reigns. There was also a World Midget Tag Team Championship, which was held by wrestlers such as Little Tokyo and Lord Littlebrook. There are also several Mexican midget titles, including AAA World Mini-Estrellas Championship and Mascot Tag Team Championship, Consejo Mundial de Lucha Libre's World Mini-Estrella Championship, Mexican National Mini-Estrella Championship, and the World Wrestling Association's Minis Championship.

== Notable midget wrestlers ==
- Cowboy Lang (Harry Lang)
- Diamond Lil (Katie Glass)
- Espectrito (Mario Jiménez) wrestled as Mini Vader in WWF
- Espectrito II (Alejandro Jiménez) wrestled as Mini Mankind and Tarantula in WWF
- Farmer Brooks (Clifford Fraser)
- Fuzzy Cupid (Leon Stap)
- Haiti Kid (Raymond Kessler)
- Hornswoggle (Dylan Postl)
- KeMonito (unknown)
- La Parkita (Alberto Jiménez) wrestled as Mini Nova in WWF
- Little Beaver (Lionel Giroux)
- Little Tokyo (Shigeri Akabane)
- Lord Littlebrook (Eric Tovey)
- Mascarita Dorada a.k.a. El Torito in WWE
- Mascarita Sagrada (real name unknown)
- Meatball (Richard Ellinger)
- Microman
- Mije (real name unknown)
- Mini Abismo Negro wrestled as Mini Goldust in WWF
- Mini Psicosis (Enrique Del Rio)
- Octagoncito (unknown) wrestled as Mosaic in WWF
- El Gallito
- Octagoncito (AAA)
- Piratita Morgan (Raymundo Rodríguez) wrestled as the Battalion in WWF
- Tiger Jackson (Claude Giroux) a.k.a. Dink the Clown in WWF
- Tzuki (real name unknown) a.k.a. Max Mini in WWF
- Shockercito (Javier Cortes Sánchez)
- Short Sleeve Sampson (Dan DiLucchio)
- Sky Low Low (Marcel Gauthier)
- Tiny the Terrible (Douglas Tunstall Jr.)
- Ultratumbita (real name unknown)

== See also ==
- Dwarf tossing
- Midgets' World Championship
- NWL Midget Championship
- WCPW Midget Championship
