= Fuzzy Cupid =

American professional wrestler

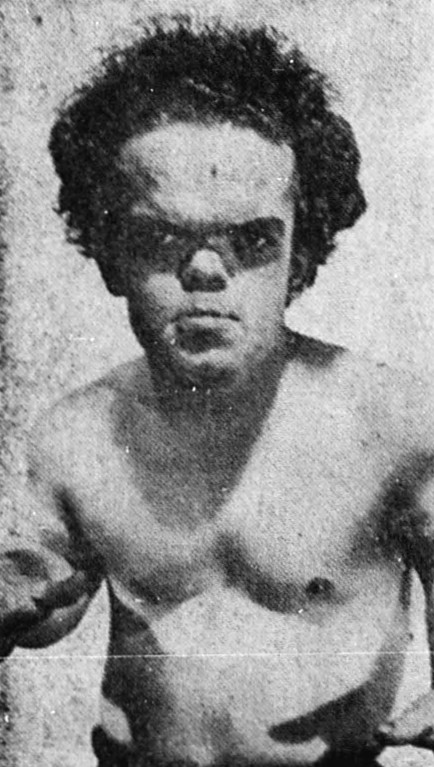

Personal information
- Born: Leon Stap; September 24, 1928 Newport, Rhode Island
- Died: April 26, 1979 (aged 50)

Professional wrestling career
- Ring name: Fuzzy Cupid
- Billed height: 4 ft 0 in (1.22 m)
- Billed weight: 68 lb (31 kg); 86 lb (39 kg)
- Debut: 1952
- Retired: 1969

Leon Stap (sometimes spelled Leon Stop) (September 24, 1928 – April 26, 1979) was an American midget professional wrestler better known by his ring name Fuzzy Cupid. During his career, he was the frequent tag team partner of fellow midget wrestler Sky Low Low.

== Professional wrestling career ==
Stap first saw a midget professional wrestling match in Texas, and he decided to try the sport. He later went to Detroit to train at the advice of promoter Norman Brown. He debuted in 1952. In the 1950s, he toured Ontario with other midget wrestlers such as Little Beaver, Lord Littlebrook, and Sky Low Low. During the 1960s, he often teamed with Sky Low Low in matches. The duo competed in the World Wide Wrestling Federation against the midget tag team of Tiny Tim and Pancho López (wrestler).

During his career, he often played the role of the bad guy and was on the receiving end of crowd violence. Because of this violence, Stap endured a fractured vertebra and a four-inch blade wound.

Retired in 1969.

== Personal life ==
The little information available about the personal life of Stap was originally from an article written by Stanley Weston in the October 1959 edition of Man's Magazine. His parents were of normal height. At the age of seven, Stap had infantile paralysis that caused him to be hospitalized for six years. He did not enter public school until the age of seventeen. Prior to entering the world of professional wrestling, he played the role of Grumpy in a traveling production of Snow White.

Stap died in 1979.

== Championships and accomplishments ==
- Professional Wrestling Hall of Fame
  - Midget Wrestler (2005)

== See also ==
- List of premature professional wrestling deaths
