= Huggy =

Huggy may refer to:

== People ==
- Huggy Leaver, a British actor
- Huggy Ragnarsson, an Icelandic-American fashion photographer
- Jermaine Hopkins, (born 1973) an American actor otherwise known as Jermaine “Huggy” Hopkins
- Dick Hugg (1928-2006), a radio disc jockey nicknamed “Huggy Boy”
- Hayagreeva Rao (born 1959), an American Academic otherwise known as Hayagreeva “Huggy” Rao
- Liev Schreiber (born 1967), an American actor whose family nickname is “Huggy”
- Huggy Fresh (died 2017), an emcee who co-founded the band Boombox Saints
- Michael Carter, a production manager otherwise known as Michael "Huggy" Carter who worked on American singer Chris Brown’s Carpe Diem Tour
- Huggy Cub, a male wrestler who competes in the American professional wrestling promotion Micro Championship Wrestling
- DJ Huggy, an American producer

== Characters ==
- Huggy Face, a minor character from the American superhero children’s cartoon WordGirl
- Huggy Wuggy, a character from the survival horror video game Poppy Playtime
- Huggy, a supporting character in the animated preschool series Wow! Wow! Wubbzy!
- Huggy Bear, a character from the action television series Starsky & Hutch
- Mr. Huggy, a character resembling a snake from the adventure game Broken Age
- Huggy Walter Brennan, a character from the 1993 French television film La Classe américaine
- Huggy, the mysterious voice the character Andromeda hears in the young adult novel Andromeda Klein

== Other uses ==
- Huggy, a yellow bear-like toy from the discontinued plush toy line Pillow Pals
- Huggy Bear (band), a Riot grrrl band
- Huggy earrings, a type of earrings
- Huggy Can't Go Home, an episode of Starsky & Hutch

== See also ==
- Huggy Bear (disambiguation)
- Huggies, an American disposable diapers and baby wipes brand
