= Cowboy Lang =

Canadian professional wrestler

Personal information
- Born: Harry Lang; August 28, 1950 Saskatchewan, Canada
- Died: January 4, 2007 (aged 56) Portland, Oregon

Professional wrestling career
- Ring name: Cowboy Lang
- Billed height: 4 ft 0 in (1.22 m)
- Billed weight: 109 lb (49 kg)
- Billed from: Calgary, Alberta, Canada
- Debut: 1967
- Retired: 1999

Harry Lang (August 28, 1950 – January 4, 2007) was a midget professional wrestler best known by his ring name Cowboy Lang.

== Professional wrestling career ==
Cowboy Lang was recognized for more than 30 years as one of the top midget wrestlers in the world. Lang made his professional wrestling debut in the mid-1960s when he was 16 years old. He would regularly rush to the ring wearing his trademark cowboy hat and boots. He was born in Saskatchewan but raised in Rimbey, Alberta. During his career he worked for various National Wrestling Alliance's promotions such as Jim Crockett Promotions, Stampede Wrestling, AWA and WWWF. On the night of April 20, 1986, Lang teamed with Little Mr. T. to beat Little Tokyo and Lord Littlebrook at AWA WrestleRock. Throughout his career, Little Tokyo showed that he was one of Cowboy Lang's biggest rivals. In the early 1980s they fought for the NWA World Midget's Championship. He would retire in 1988. He would return to wrestling in 1995 working for All Pro Wrestling in California. His last match was in 1999. Lang died of heart disease at age 56 in a Portland, Oregon hospital.

== Championships and accomplishments ==
- National Wrestling Alliance
  - NWA World Midget's Championship (2 times)
- Professional wrestling
  - Midgets' World Championship (2 times)
