= Claude Giroux (wrestler) =

Canadian professional wrestler (born 1956)

Personal information
- Born: July 13, 1956 (age 70) Saint-Jean-sur-Richelieu, Quebec, Canada

Professional wrestling career
- Ring name(s): Dink the Clown; Little Hulkster; The Macho Midget; Tiger Jackson; Tiny Tim
- Billed height: 4 ft 0 in (1.22 m)
- Billed weight: 95 lb (43 kg)
- Trained by: Sky Low Low; Little Brutus

Claude Giroux (born July 13, 1956) is a Canadian midget wrestler. Giroux's biggest exposure came when he performed as Doink the Clown's sidekick Dink in the World Wrestling Federation between 1993 and 1995. Outside of his stint as Dink the Clown, Giroux also performed in the WWF as Tiger Jackson in the 1980s and as The Macho Midget in the 1990s.

== Tiger Jackson ==
Giroux made his debut in the late 1970s after being trained by Little Brutus and Hall of Famer Sky Low Low under the name "Tiger Jackson". With Midget Wrestling being seen as a sideshow to the "tall version", Giroux tended to travel from promotion to promotion instead of staying in one area for a long time. In the early days of his career, Giroux wrestled in many National Wrestling Alliance territories, for the World Wrestling Council in Puerto Rico, and in Germany, as well. Giroux also made appearances in the World Wrestling Federation from 1982, often teaming with his brother Lionel Giroux who wrestled as "Little Beaver".

In late 1992, Jackson signed on with the WWF and started to team up with The Bushwhackers in their feud against The Beverly Brothers. The Beverly Brothers recruited "Little Louie" to even the sides but to little success falling to the combination of the Bushwhackers and Tiger Jackson time and again including a prime time loss on the "Road to WrestleMania IX" Special shown on March 28.

== Imitating others ==
In Mexico there is a tradition for the midget wrestlers to imitate "full sized" wrestlers such as Mascarita Sagrada and Mascara Sagrada. In the 1990s, Claude Giroux followed that tradition after working for the WWF for about 6 months, appearing as miniature versions of several full-sized wrestlers.

=== Macho Midget ===
Giroux's first imitation gimmick came as a direct result of the antics of the heel Doink the Clown, who had a second Doink come out to interfere in the match. During a match between Doink and Randy Savage on Monday Night Raw, Giroux climbed out from under the ring dressed like a miniature version of Randy Savage (instantly dubbed the Macho Midget). The sight of the Macho Midget distracted Doink long enough to be rolled up for a pinfall. After his debut, Giroux helped Randy Savage out a few times but also went back to teaming with the Bushwhackers, this time working as "The Macho Midget".

=== Dink the Clown ===
Giroux's best known imitation role was as "Dink the Clown," the slapstick partner of Doink the Clown (at the time played by Ray Apollo, the fourth and last wrestler to play Doink on a regular basis in the WWF). Dink was introduced as a present to Doink the Clown by Santa Claus himself on an edition of WWF Superstars of Wrestling that aired on November 27, 1993. From then on, Dink accompanied Doink to ringside and took part in the clown antics played on opponents. While acting as a manager, Giroux occasionally also wrestled as Dink, twice on Pay Per View. Dink's first PPV appearance was on March 20, 1994 at WrestleMania X, teaming with Doink to face Bam Bam Bigelow and Luna Vachon in a losing effort. Dink's second PPV appearance came at the 1994 Survivor Series where he was joined by fellow "Mini Clowns" Pink and Wink to make up the team Clowns'R'Us to face Jerry Lawler and his three "Mini Kings" – Sleazy, Cheesy and Queasy. After losing the match, all six midgets attacked Jerry Lawler and chased him from the ring. Then afterwards, Giroux left the WWF in spring 1995.

== After the WWF ==
When the Dink gimmick was phased out by 1995, Giroux left the WWF as well, working mainly on the independent circuit ever since. In 1997, Giroux made a one-off appearance for World Championship Wrestling as Tiger Jackson when the company toured through Montreal, which has been Giroux's home territory since leaving the WWF.

Still wrestles as of 2024.

== Championships and accomplishments ==
- Wrestling Observer Newsletter
  - Worst Worked Match of the Year (1994) with Doink, Pink and Wink vs. Jerry Lawler, Sleazy, Queasy and Cheesy at Survivor Series
- World Wrestling Federation
  - Slammy Award (1 time)
    - Funniest (1994)
