= Little Tokyo (wrestler) =

Japanese professional wrestler

Shigeru Akabane

Personal information
- Born: July 5, 1941 Tokyo, Japan
- Died: September 6, 2011 (aged 70) St. Joseph, Missouri, U.S.

Professional wrestling career
- Ring name(s): Shigeri Akabane; Little Tokyo; Tokyo
- Billed height: 4 ft (122 cm)
- Billed weight: 98 lb (44 kg)
- Trained by: Lord Littlebrook
- Debut: Early 1970s
- Retired: 1998

Shigeru Akabane (赤羽 茂, Akabane Shigeru; July 5, 1941 – September 6, 2011), best known under his ring name Little Tokyo, was a Japanese professional midget wrestler who competed in North American promotions from the 1970s into the 1990s including appearances for American Wrestling Association (AWA), National Wrestling Alliance (NWA) and the World Wrestling Federation, (WWF) most notably appearing at WrestleMania III in a mixed tag team match with Lord Littlebrook and King Kong Bundy against Hillbilly Jim, the Haiti Kid and Little Beaver in 1987. He held the NWA World Midget's Championship on three occasions

== Professional wrestling career ==
Akabane began his professional wrestling career in the early 1970s in his native Japan working under his real name. At some point during his first year in the business a troupe of professional midget wrestlers toured Japan with Lord Littlebrook striking up a friendship with Akabane. The friendship led to Akabane travelling to the United States where he became part of a touring troupe of midget wrestlers, known as "Little Tokyo" playing off his Japanese heritage and martial arts background. In August 1974 Akabane, as Little Tokyo, was recognized as the NWA World Midget's Champion. Records are not clear on when Little Tokyo lost the championship but he was once again billed as the World champion in 1981. On December 25, 1981, Little Tokyo lost the championship to Tiny Tom as part of Big Time Wrestling's Christmas Star Wars show. One year later Little Tokyo appeared at WCCW's Christmas Star Wars losing to Lone Eagle on the under card. On May 30, 1983 Little Tokyo defeated Cowboy Lang to become a three time world champion. On September 28, 1985 at American Wrestling Association's SuperClash '85 event Little Tokyo successfully defended the title against Midget Mr. T. On January 12, 1986, the same Little Mr. T ended Little Tokyo's third and final reign as World Midget Champion.

Little Tokyo's most notable match took place on March 29, 1987 when he worked for the World Wrestling Federation (WWF) at their WrestleMania III show. At the show he teamed with mentor Lord Littlebrook and King Kong Bundy against Hillbilly Jim, the Haiti Kid and Little Beaver. The match ended when all 4 midget wrestlers attacked the 458 lb (208 kg) King Kong Bundy after Bundy attacked Little Beaver.

On January 1, 1988, Little Tokyo became the first holder of the Windy City Wrestling Midget Championship when he defeated Cowboy Cottrell. On September 29, 1994, on the last show ever held by Universal Wrestling Federation, Little Tokyo defeated Karate Kid to become the first and only holder of the UWF Midget World Championship. Little Tokyo won the WCW Midget for a second time in 1996. Akabane retired in 1998.

== Retirement and death ==
At the age of 69, Akabane was diagnosed with base tongue cancer. Doctors said it was cureable and family and friends gathered around him for support. He was living in St. Joseph, Missouri at the time.

On September 6, 2011, Akabane died after suffering a heart attack at the age of 70, while getting up to use the bathroom.

== Championships and accomplishments ==
- National Wrestling Alliance

- NWA World Midget's Championship (3 times)

- Professional wrestling
  - Midgets' World Championship (3 times)
- Universal Wrestling Federation

- UWF Midget World Championship (1 time, only)

- Windy City Wrestling

- WCW Midget Championship (2 times, first)
