= Northern Comfort =

2010 film

Northern Comfort is a 2010 American improvisational film starring Rod Webber and Greta Gerwig. Shot in three days for three thousand dollars, the film is the second of Webber's films based on a manifesto which has been likened to DIY Dogme films which use limited equipment and other resources in an attempt to create an atmosphere of realism not present in most traditional schools of film-making. The Boston Globe’s Ty Burr called it "DIY Dogme dedicated to Webber’s guiding maxim: 'The movie already exists, it’s just waiting to be found.’" During an interview for Gerwig's Greenberg starring Ben Stiller (Gerwig's first mainstream movie) she was asked whether she'd be doing more films for $3000 and replied, "[Laughs] Maybe not $3,000 budgets but maybe $50,000 budgets. I'm interested in making low-budget films not for the sake of making low-budget films but because a lot of filmmakers that I want to work with and that I like are working on a smaller scale."

== Synopsis ==
The film tells the story of Horace (Webber) and Cassandra (Gerwig) who meet while traveling to Canada. The pair skirt around their feelings as Gerwig deals with an illness which she's keeping to herself. "Because they’re damaged in similar ways — we learn they’re both the black sheep of their respective families — they make for sweet-and-sour traveling companions, or would if Cassandra didn’t keep disappearing on Horace. The people they meet on the road offer varying object lessons in coping with the disaster of living. A comically mismatched couple at a roadside motel (Joseph James Bellamy and Irina Peligrad) seem ready to seduce our heroes or at least drag them into a discussion of superheroes as modern gods. A hermit (Markus Nechay) offers Horace and Cassandra beds for the night, a musical interlude, and a glimpse of one man’s sad isolation. The closest the movie gets to a statement comes from an older man in a diner (Robert Koch) who locates nirvana in the act of tying flies."

== Critique ==
The Boston Globe described the film as "a tiny movie that casts a tiny but genuine spell."

Paul Ryan of the Weekly Dig draws several comparisons between Webber and big budget director James Cameron saying, "God knows what James Cameron makes his movies for", says filmmaker Rod Webber, continuing "[t]here are real awkward moments, real distress and very little CGI as the pair bumbles their way through the plot, meets real people along the way, awkwardly waxing philosophy and never mentioning their feelings to each other, while being filmed. All of which makes Webber, decidedly anti-James Cameron."

== Reel Fest ==
Northern Comfort premiered at Reel Fest. Reel Fest 2 was May 28 to June 2, 2010.
