= Rod Webber =

American musician, filmmaker, and actor

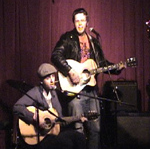
- Born: Rod Webber; Boston, Massachusetts, U.S.
- Occupations: Filmmaker, musician, actor
- Years active: 1999–present

Rod Webber is an American musician, filmmaker, and actor. Though in his early music career he shared the stage with anti-folk acts Daniel Johnston (The Devil and Daniel Johnston) and Kimya Dawson (former Moldy Peach), Webber is probably best known for his improvisational films and documentaries, many of which were created using Webber's personal manifesto, which is cited in various publications about the filmmaker. Webber has twice directed former mumblecore actress Greta Gerwig, first in his film I Thought You Finally Completely Lost It and next in Northern Comfort, both shot primarily in a three-day shooting frenzy. Webber has also collaborated frequently (three times) with Doug "Tiny the Terrible" Tunstall, an outsider politician, WWE wrestler, and the subject of Webber's documentary A Man Among Giants. In addition to his filmmaking, Webber has released several successful musical endeavors.

== Career ==
At 21, Rod Webber began climbing the college music charts with Burned My Feet On Meat Street. Webber followed up Burned My Feet with The You I Knew, featuring the lead track, "Blue Hour". According to The Boston Globe, he began a courtship with major record labels such as Columbia, Arista, and Universal Records, but ultimately stuck to his indie roots, and continues to release records without the help of a major.

In 2005, Webber began directing Monkfish starring Lloyd Kaufman, and Tiny The Terrible, which debuted May 11, 2005 at The Paradise Rock Club in Boston. Webber followed up Monkfish with A Man Among Giants, a documentary in which Webber trails Monkfish star Doug 'Tiny' Tunstall aka Tiny The Terrible in his quest to unseat James E. Doyle, the Mayor of Pawtucket Rhode Island. After Tunstall was arrested in 2009 for creating a disturbance in a courtroom, Webber bailed him out of jail. Tunstall was subsequently committed to a prison mental hospital, resulting in a year-long effort by Webber to have him released. Unsuccessful in helping Tiny's case through legal channels, Webber released a new feature-length documentary, American Psych Ward about Tunstall's unlawful imprisonment. After four days of packed screenings, Tunstall was released.

Webber's effort to have Tunstall released from prison indefinitely postponed the release of Northern Comfort, which he had shot with indie 'mumblecore' queen Greta Gerwig the previous year. The film was delayed until May 28, 2010, by which time, Gerwig had gone on to her mainstream acting career with titles such as Greenberg starring Ben Stiller. Despite the delay, Northern Comfort met with favorable reviews. According to The Boston Globe, Webber and Gerwig create "ornery sparks", and The Weekly Dig called him the "Anti-James Cameron" as a result.

Next, Webber began filming Milkweed, a drama starring Webber and Ali Bell who helped him to produce Psych Ward, the year before. Again, despite Webber's speedy filming technique, the film was delayed to promote the release of My America, a politically charged drama which was shot in the spring of 2010 after the production of Milkweed began. The Boston Globe called the film, "a shocking drama on the subject of racism." Time Out Boston described My America as "chilling."

Milkweed was released in 2013 and also stars Mark Wahlberg's eldest brother, Arthur.

== Other works ==
- Is the creator of UtopiaLand (2010), a new animated series.
- Created and organized a traveling event called "Circus of the Shattered Monkey" featuring live music, poetry, and sometimes films. The event was also known by its French name "Cirque Du Singe Brisé."

== Other information ==
- Webber's version of "Syd Barrett Blues" is the original version released in 2004, and came out a year before The Black Angels (band) "Syd Barrett Blues," which takes the concept of Webber's ode to Barrett in the vein of Barrett's tribute to Bob Dylan, "Bob Dylan Blues."
- When starting out, he was caught making one of his films without a permit. He was forced to shut down his production for use of a plastic toy pistol, and decided to instead release Burned My Feet On Meat Street.
- For a brief stretch in 2004, Webber wrote songs for his friend Michael Swasey, the host of The Swasey Show at WFNX.
- In 2007, Webber helped to document fellow Bostonians The Dropkick Murphys for their The Meanest of Times DVD.
- A longtime resident of Boston, Webber's 20-minute documentary of Brian McNamee shot in Everett, Massachusetts, helped to break news on the Pro-Baseball steroid scandal in 2008, and was posted by The Boston Herald on their website on March 27 of that year.
- Webber has written, arranged and produced music for a handful of musicals and other theater productions. In 1998, he wrote the music for David Hanbury's Talking To Maybe, and co-wrote a number of songs for Personal Instrument in 2000, also by David Hanbury. He worked as record producer for cousin Jake Oliver's Viva Los Bastarditos.

== Filmography as director, cinematographer, composer ==
Year	Film	Job	Notes
2006	Postcards From The Den Of Failure	Camera	
2007	The Meanest Of Times	DP	Short Documentary
2008	Brian McNamee speaks at ANC	Director	Short Documentary
2008	A Man Among Giants	Director	Documentary
2008	Sweetie	Composer	Short directed by A.T. Sayre
2008	I Thought You Finally Completely Lost It	Director	Actor: 'Rod'
2008	Monkfish	Director	Actor: Stewart Tanner
2009	American Psych Ward	Director	Documentary
2009	Virgil & Caesar	Director	Short
2009	Harmony Korine & The Malingerer Fish	Director	Short Documentary
2009	Bo Diddley & The Bout With Mike Tyson	Director	Short Documentary
2010	Northern Comfort	Director	Actor: Horace
2010	DeathWorld	Director	Short
2010	Do It Again	Camera	Kinks Documentary
2010	UtopiaLand	Director	Actor: Various
2011	Milkweed	Director	Actor: Lonny Robards
2011	My America	Director	Actor: E.J. Winston
2021	2020: The Dumpster Fire	Director	Political Documentary

== Discography ==
- 1997 – Math & Emotion
- 1998 – Telepath
- 1998 – Ascent
- 1999 – Burned My Feet On Meat Street
- 2000 – The Death & Burial of Rod Webber
- 2001 – Incandescent
- 2001 – Folk Songs
- 2002 – The You I Knew
- 2003 – Paper Slipper Shuffle
- 2004 – Eastertown

== Awards ==
- Rod Webber won "Choice Award" for A Man Among Giants at Ruff Cutz Indie Film Conference.
