= NWL Midget Championship =

Professional wrestling midget championship

Details
- Promotion: National Wrestling League
- Date established: 1995
- Date retired: 1999
Statistics
- First champion(s): Hollywood Miles "Vader" Glencoe
- Final champion(s): Short Dawg
- Longest reign: Bad Boy Buck (571 days)
- Shortest reign: Joe Kidd (66 days)

The NWL Midget Championship was the midget professional wrestling title in the National Wrestling League promotion. It was first won by Hollywood Miles "Vader" Glencoe who defeated Little Salami (with manager Professor Egon Ecton) in 1995. The title was defended primarily in the Mid-Atlantic and East Coast, most often in Hagerstown, Maryland, but also in Pennsylvania and West Virginia until its retirement in 1999. There were 4 recognized known champions with a total of 4 title reigns.

== Title history ==
No.	Wrestler	Reign	Date	Location	Notes
1	Hollywood Miles "Vader" Glencoe	1	1995		Defeated Little Salami to become the first champion.
The title is vacated.
2	Joe Kidd	1	February 7, 1998	Keyser, West Virginia	Defeated Bad Boy Buck to win the vacant title.
3	Bad Boy Buck	1	March 14, 1998	McConnellsburg, Pennsylvania	
4	Short Dawg	1	November 6, 1999	McConnellsburg, Pennsylvania	

== See also ==
- Midgets' World Championship
- NWA World Midget's Championship
- WCPW Midget Championship
