= NWA World Midget's Championship =

Professional wrestling midget championship

Details
- Date established: 1949
- Date retired: December, 2009

Other names
- NWA World Mini's Championship; PWR World Mini's Championship
Statistics
- First champion: Sky Low Low
- Most reigns: Lord Littlebrook/Little Tokyo (3 reigns)
- Longest reign: (Note: Championship history is too uncertain to determine.)
- Shortest reign: Farmer Pete (7 days)
- Oldest champion: Lord Littlebrook (42 years, 363 days) (Note: Records in the birth dates of wrestlers from this era are not complete, it is possible there was an older champion.)
- Youngest champion: Cowboy Bradley (25 years, 111 days) (Note: Records in the birth dates of wrestlers from this era are not complete, it is possible there was a younger champion.)
- Heaviest champion: Octagoncito (101 lb (46 kg)) (Note: Records for the weight of some wrestlers from this era are not complete, it is possible there was a heavier champion.)
- Lightest champion: Lord Littlebrook (50 lb (23 kg)) (Note: Records for the weight of some wrestlers from early era are not complete, it is possible there was a lighter champion.)

The NWA World Midget's Championship was the National Wrestling Alliance's midget wrestling singles championship. Large parts of the championship history is undocumented due to lack of documentation of Midget wrestling for large periods of time from the 1950s to the 1980s. In that period of time, there were two touring groups of midget wrestlers in the United States, both had a "World Champion", leading to some uncertainty as to who was the NWA World Midget's Champion, often based on if the champion was booked as defending the championship in an NWA territory. The first wrestler to lay claim to the Midget's World Championship was Sky Low Low after he won a 30-man tournament in Paris, France. The tournament was either fictitious or not an NWA sanctioned event as it took place in Europe. But at some point after 1949 the NWA recognized Sky Low Low as their champion.

It is impossible to determine who held the championship the longest, but it is plausible that Farmer Pete's 7 day title reign in 1957 was the shortest of all the reigns. Lord Littlebrook and Little Tokyo are both credited with three championship reigns, but due to incomplete records it is possible that either had more reigns or someone else had more than three reigns in total. Because the championship was a professional wrestling championship, it was not won or lost competitively but instead by the decision of the bookers of a wrestling promotion. The championship was awarded after the chosen participant "won" a match to maintain the illusion that professional wrestling is a competitive sport.

== Title history ==
Key

Symbol	Meaning
#	The overall championship reign
Reign	The reign number for the specific set of wrestlers listed.
Event	The event promoted by the respective promotion in which the title changed hands
N/A	The specific information has not been found
—	Used for vacated reigns in order to not count it as an official reign
(nlt)	Indicates that a title change took place "no later than" a certain date. Often because the date of a title change is not found but a date of a title defense by the champions is found.
	Title history is uncertain in that time period.

#	Wrestler	Reign	Date	Days held	Location	Event	Notes
1	Sky Low Low	1	1949	(Note: Records are unclear on most of the dates prior to 1998 making it impossible to correctly calculate the length of this reign)	Paris, France	Live event	Won a 30-man tournament to become the first World Midget champion, but the title may not be recognized by the NWA.
2	Little Beaver	1	1950s		(Note: The location of the match was not captured as part of the championship documentation.)	Live event	
3	Sonny Boy Cassidy	1	September 1957 (NLT)			Live event	Was recognized as the World champion by non-NWA promoter in Dallas, TX as of June 1953; recognized in Memphis, Tennessee as of September 1957 and Florence, Alabama as of October 1957.
4	Farmer Pete	1	October 4, 1957	7	Florence, Alabama	Live event	
5	Sonny Boy Cassidy	2	October 11, 1957		Florence, Alabama	Live event	
6	Cowboy Bradley	1	June 1960			Live event	Recognized as champion in Georgia.
7	Lord Littlebrook	1	March 1966			Live event	
8	Sky Low Low	2	1967 (NLT)			Live event	
9	Lord Littlebrook	2	June 28, 1968 (NLT)			Live event	Recognized in St. Joseph, Missouri; Still billed as champion on January 31, 1969.
10	Lord Littlebrook	3	1972 (NLT)			Live event	Recognized in Los Angeles, California in 1972.
11	Little Beaver	2	January 1974 (NLT)			Live event	
12	Little Tokyo	1	August 1974			Live event	Recognized as champion in Georgia, Texas, and Oklahoma. Possibly recognized in other NWA territories.
13	Cowboy Lang	1	April 25, 1980		Calgary, Alberta, Canada	Live event	
14	Little Tokyo	2	December 1981	(Note: The date the championship was lost has not been documented which means the championship reign lasted anywhere between 1 day and 24 days)		Live event	
15	Tiny Tom	1	December 25, 1981		Dallas, Texas	Live event	
16	Cowboy Lang	2	May 1983	(Note: The date the championship was lost has not been documented which means the championship reign lasted anywhere between 1 day and 29 days)		Live event	
17	Little Tokyo	3	May 30, 1983	958	Vancouver, British Columbia, Canada	Live event	
18	Little Mr. T	1	January 12, 1986		St. Joseph, Missouri	Live event	
Championship inactive at some point after 1986
19	Tiny the Terrible	1	October 4, 1998	167	Terryville, Connecticut	Live event	Defeated Half Nelson for the championship.
20	Little Killer	1	March 20, 1999	175	Thomaston, Connecticut	Live event	
21	Jinx	1	September 11, 1999		Monroe, Connecticut	Live event	
Championship inactive at some point after 1999.
22	Octagoncito	1	September 20, 2009	(Note: The date the PWR withdrew from the NWA has not been documented which means the championship reign lasted anywhere between 72 days and 102 days)	Santa Cruz, California	PWR Live event	Defeated El Espantito to become the Pro Wrestling Revolution (PWR) Mini's champion, which was also acknowledged as the NWA World champion at the time
Championship inactive In December 2009 when PWR leaves the NWA. Octagoncito continues to defend the title as the PWR World Mini's Championship.

== See also ==
- NWL Midget Championship
- WCPW Midget Championship
- Mini-Estrella
