= Micro Championship Wrestling =

American professional wrestling promotion

- Acronym: MCW
- Founded: 2009
- Style: Midget wrestling Professional wrestling Sports entertainment
- Headquarters: Hudson, Florida
- Founder: Johnny "Attitude" Greene
- Parent: Micro Championship Wrestling, LLC
- Website: https://www.microwrestling.com/

Micro Championship Wrestling (MCW) is a professional wrestling promotion primarily showcasing midget wrestling. The promotion was founded by former pro wrestler Stefan Wagner (Johnny "Attitude" Greene) and featured promotional videos by Hulk Hogan. Production for the show began in March 2011 in Tampa, Florida. The promotion debuted on American cable channel truTV on September 14, 2011. According to Greene, it averaged 1 million viewers per week and aired in 34 countries.

Johnny Greene died on June 12, 2018, at 53 years old.

== Championships ==
=== MCW Championship ===
MCW Championship

Details
- Promotion: Micro Championship Wrestling
- Date established: August 23, 2011
Statistics
- First champion: Stefan Wagner
- Most reigns: Blixx
- Longest reign: Meatball
- Shortest reign: Demo
- Youngest champion: Stefan Wagner
- Heaviest champion: Meatball
- Lightest champion: Demo

The MCW Championship is a professional wrestling championship owned and promoted by Micro Championship Wrestling (MCW). The championship was created and debuted on August 23, 2011, at an MCW live event.

The first champion was Stefan Wagner who won a Battle Royal. Nearly a year later Meatball defeated Stefan Wagner to become the 2nd MCW Champ in history. He held the title for over a year until early September 2013. In early September 2013 the MCW Championship switched hands to Huggie Cub. Less than 6 months later Meatball would once again become Champion.

#	Wrestlers	Reign	Date	Days held	Location	Event	Notes
1	Stefan Wagner	1				Live Event	Won a Battle Royal to become the inaugural champion.
2	Meatball	1					
3	Huggie Cub	1					
4	Meatball	2					

== Roster ==
=== Male wrestlers ===
Ring name	Real name	Notes
Syko "Micro BYKO"	Derec Pemberton	
Baby Jesus	Jamie Brooks	
Lil show	Jacob Brooks	
Hank Dalton	Steven Mcgregor	11/22/1980-11/04/2022
Hot Rod	Rodney	Jamaican Jo Joey Hawkins
Chief Little Foot	Eric Ear	
Blixx	Carlton Barber	
Demo	Norberto "Chip" Santiago	
Mini Sheik	Josh Rehkopf	
Flyin' Ryan	Dan DiLucchio	
Hillbilly Bob	Jacob Brooks	
Huggy Cub	Eric Hightower	
Justice	Michael Moore	
Kidd J		
Meatball	Richard Ellinger	MCW Heavyweight Champion
Sugar James	Casey James	
Disco Dom		
Micro Tiger		
Rango		
Andrew The Giant		

=== Female wrestlers ===
Ring name	Real name	Notes
Pinky Shortcake	Ashley WaterHouse	
Little Miss	BreAnnah Belliveau	
Lil Chola		
Jersey Jess	Jessica Capri Sloan	Also valet of Starla Dominatrix
Starla Dominatrix	Starla Campbell	
Trixie Dynamite	Katie Snyder	

=== Alumni ===
- Jimmy Vegas
- Sarge

== Other personnel ==
=== Referees ===
Ring name	Real name	Notes
Pat Tanaka	Pat Tanaka	Also trainer

=== Management ===
Ring name	Real name	Notes
Johnny Attitude	Johnny Attitude	Owner/Announcer
Hulk Hogan	Hulk Hogan	Promoter/Consultant
