= WCPW Midget Championship =

Professional wrestling midget championship

Details
- Promotion: Windy City Pro Wrestling
- Date established: April 13, 1988
- Date retired: 2001

Other name
- WCW Midget Championship
Statistics
- First champion: Little Tokyo
- Final champions: Lone Eagle (won August 1999)
- Most reigns: Little Tokyo (2); Lone Eagle (2)
- Longest reign: Little Tokyo (1,758 days)
- Shortest reign: Chris Cruz (85 days)

The WCPW Midget Championship was a professional wrestling midget title in Windy City Pro Wrestling (WCPW). Originally, WCPW was known as Windy City Wrestling (WCW), however, a lawsuit brought by World Championship Wrestling forced the smaller promotion to change its name to "Windy City Pro Wrestling" in 1997. The championship remained active until 2001 when it was discontinued.

The inaugural champion was Little Tokyo, who defeated Cowboy Cottrell at a live event in Chicago, Illinois on January 1, 1988 to become the first WCW Midget Champion. Little Tokyo and Lone Eagle both hold the record for most reigns, with two each. At 1,758 days, Little Tokyo's first reign was the longest in the title's history. Chris Cruz's only reign was the shortest in the history of the title lasting only 85 days. Overall, there have been 8 reigns shared between 6 wrestlers, with two vacancies, and 1 deactivation.

== Title history ==
Key

#	Order in reign history
Reign	The reign number for the specific set of wrestlers listed
Event	The event in which the title was won
—	Used for vacated reigns so as not to count it as an official reign
N/A	The information is not available or is unknown
+	Indicates the current reign is changing daily

=== Names ===
Name	Years
WCW Midget Championship	1988 — 1996
WCPW Midget Championship	1997 — 2001

=== Reigns ===
#	Wrestlers	Reign	Date	Days held	Location	Event	Notes	Ref.
1	Little Tokyo	1	January 1, 1988	1,758	St. Joseph, Missouri	Live event	Little Tokyo defeated Cowboy Cottrell to become the first WCW Midget Champion.	
2	Chris Cruz	1	October 24, 1992	85	Mt. Vernon, Illinois	Live event		
3	Karate Kid	1	January 17, 1993	1,119	Springfield, Illinois	Live event		
4	Little Tokyo	2	February 10, 1996	189	St. Joseph, Missouri	Live event		
5	Bobby Dean	1	August 17, 1996	394	Springfield, Illinois	Live event		
6	Lone Eagle	2	September 15, 1997	687	Nashville, Tennessee	Live event		
—	Vacated	—	August 3, 1999	—	N/A	Live event		
7	Puppet the Psycho Dwarf	1	August 17, 1999	N/A	Sedalia, Missouri	Live event		
—	Vacated	—	August 1999	—	N/A	N/A	The title is vacated when Puppet the Psycho Dwarf is stripped of the title.	
8	Lone Eagle	2	August 1999	N/A	N/A	N/A	Lone Eagle is awarded the vacant championship.	
—	Deactivated	—	2001	—	N/A	N/A	The title becomes inactive after 2001 and is subsequently discontinued.	

== List of combined reigns ==
Rank (Note: Each reign is ranked highest to lowest; reigns with the same number mean that they are tied for that certain rank.)	Wrestler	# of reigns	Combined days
1	Little Tokyo	2	1,947
2	Karate Kid	1	1,119
3	Lone Eagle	2	687+
4	Bobby Dean	1	394
5	Chris Cruz	1	85

== See also ==
- Midgets' World Championship
- NWA World Midget's Championship
- NWL Midget Championship
