= Haiti Kid =

Haitian professional wrestler

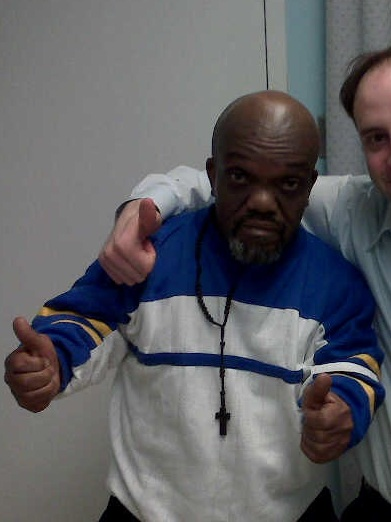
- Haiti Kid in 2009

Personal information
- Born: Raymond Kessler; 1954 (age 71–72) New York City, New York, U.S.

Professional wrestling career
- Ring name(s): Haiti Kid; Raymond Kessler; Tahitian Kid; Tahiti Kid; Little Mr. T
- Billed weight: 101 lb (46 kg)
- Billed from: Port-au-Prince, Haiti
- Debut: 1971
- Retired: 1994

Raymond Kessler (born 1954) is an American retired professional wrestler, who has dwarfism, and wrestled under the name Haiti Kid in the World Wrestling Federation.

== Professional wrestling career ==
He started his career in the WWWF as a babyface in 1971, teaming up with Sonny Boy Hayes, Joey Russell, Little Beaver and Sky Low Low. Over the years, he fought in many promotions throughout North America. They included Stampede, AWA, NWA, Championship Wrestling from Florida, Portland Wrestling and MACW.

On February 25, 1984, Haiti Kid appeared on an episode of WWF All-Star Wrestling teaming with Tiger Jackson to defeat Dana Carpenter and Poncho Boy. He appeared in Mr. T's corner at WrestleMania 2 in his match against Rowdy Roddy Piper. He also competed at WrestleMania III in a mixed tag team match with Hillbilly Jim and Little Beaver against King Kong Bundy, Little Tokyo and Lord Littlebrook.

In 1993, he feuded with Butch Cassidy in Puerto Rico's World Wrestling Council. A year later he retired from the sport.

He was homeless in New York City for a while ^{(source?).}

== Other media ==
He appeared in the comedy film Penitentiary III.
