= King Kong Bundy =

American professional wrestler (1957–2019)

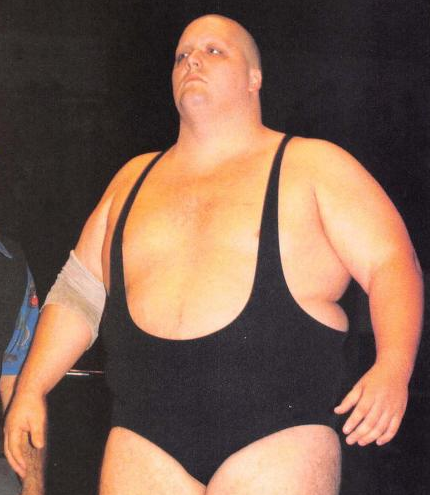
- King Kong Bundy in 1983

Personal information
- Born: Christopher Alan Pallies; November 7, 1955 Woodbury, New Jersey, U.S.
- Died: March 4, 2019 (aged 63) Glassboro, New Jersey, U.S.
- Education: Gloucester County College
- Spouse: Marcy Russell (m. 1994; div. 2002)
- Children: 1

Professional wrestling career
- Ring name(s): Big Daddy Bundy; Boom Boom Bundy; Chris Bundy; Chris Cannon; Chris Canyon; Crippler Cannon; King Kong Bundy; Man Mountain Cannon, Jr
- Billed height: 6 ft 4 in (193 cm)
- Billed weight: 458 lb (208 kg)
- Billed from: Atlantic City, New Jersey
- Trained by: Larry Sharpe
- Debut: March 7, 1981
- Retired: May 2007

Christopher Alan Pallies (November 7, 1955 – March 4, 2019) was an American professional wrestler, professional wrestling promoter, stand-up comedian and actor better known by the ring name, King Kong Bundy. Under this gimmick, he portrayed a pugnacious, trash-talking villain character.

He appeared in the World Wrestling Federation (WWF) in the mid-1980s and mid-1990s and wrestled in the main event of WrestleMania 2 in 1986, facing Hulk Hogan in a steel cage match for the WWF World Heavyweight Championship. He also headlined the inaugural Survivor Series in 1987, as well as the first edition of Extreme Championship Wrestling's flagship event, November to Remember, in 1993.

== Early life ==
Christopher Alan Pallies was born in Woodbury, New Jersey, on November 7, 1955, to Donald Pallies, a railroad freight agent, and Margret (McCarthy) Pallies, a department store clerk. He attended Washington Township High School in Sewell, New Jersey, graduating in 1974. He had two sisters and three brothers. While in high school, Pallies wrestled heavyweight on the wrestling team. He won two regional titles. He wrestled heavyweight at Gloucester County College where he won JUCO championship. His brother Jeff, also a member of the high school wrestling team, later wrestled for Glassboro State, now known as Rowan University. He was a two-time Metro Conference champion.

== Professional wrestling career ==
=== Early career (1981–1985) ===
Pallies was trained to wrestle by Larry Sharpe at the "Monster Factory" in Bellmawr, New Jersey. He debuted on March 7, 1981, wrestling for the World Wrestling Federation under the ring name "Chris Canyon". His first victory was against Strong Kobayashi in WWF on July 10, 1981. In the early years of his career, he also used the name "Chris Cannon".

In 1982, Pallies relocated to Texas, where he joined the World Class Championship Wrestling. He was developed by the Von Erich family as the babyface "Big Daddy Bundy" (after Shirley Crabtree's "Big Daddy" moniker), wearing blue jeans with a rope belt, but turned heel following a dispute with the Von Erich Family, and was recruited by "Playboy" Gary Hart and dramatically reintroduced as "King Kong Bundy", with the "Big Daddy" portion of his moniker replaced by the name of cinematic monster King Kong, wearing the black singlet for the first time to signify his change. He lost his hair during the feud, adding to his signature look. Bundy was Fritz Von Erich's opponent for Fritz's 1982 retirement match at the Fritz Von Erich Retirement Show held at the Texas Stadium.

Bundy also competed in various territories such as the American Wrestling Association and Georgia Championship Wrestling where he teamed with Masked Superstar to defeat his former stablemates the Road Warriors for the NWA National Tag Team Championship. He also had a tendency to demand a five-count (as opposed to the usual three count) for pinfalls whenever he dominated his opponent in a squash match, a gimmick he began while wrestling for Mid-South Wrestling. During this time Bundy also wrestled in Memphis, Tennessee often teaming with Rick Rude and Jim Neidhart against opponents such as Jerry Lawler.

=== World Wrestling Federation (1985–1988) ===
==== WWF Championship pursuit (1985–1986) ====
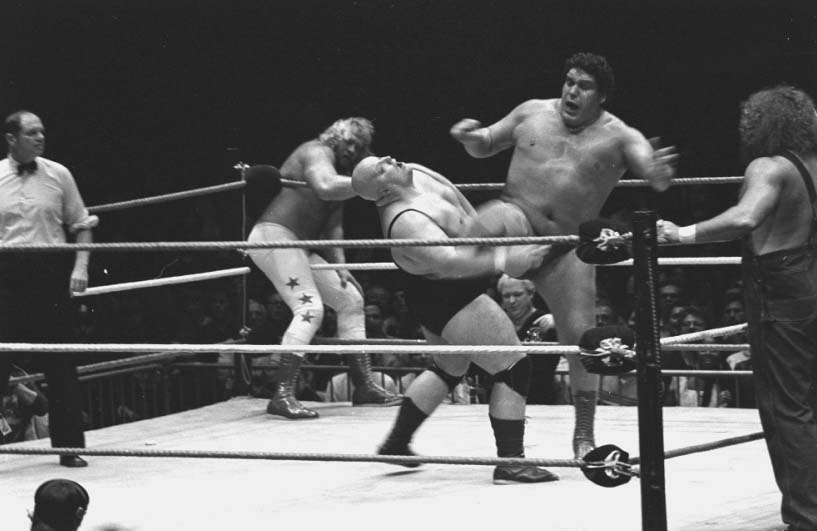
Bundy and Big John Studd facing André the Giant and Hillbilly Jim in 1985

After making a few appearances on New Japan Pro-Wrestling/World Wrestling Federation joint shows in early 1985, Bundy officially debuted in the WWF on the March 16, 1985 airing of WWF Championship Wrestling, defeating Mario Mancini. First managed by Jimmy Hart, he was immediately pushed with dominating victories over all of his opponents. Bundy also reprised his gimmick of demanding a five-count from the referee while pinning an opponent, to show how badly he had beaten his hapless opponent. He defeated S. D. Jones in what was announced as only nine seconds at the first WrestleMania at Madison Square Garden (it was actually about 17 seconds). This remained the shortest match in WrestleMania history until 2008 when Kane defeated Chavo Guerrero Jr. in a legitimate eight seconds at WrestleMania XXIV.

In September 1985, Hart traded Bundy to manager Bobby Heenan in exchange for Adrian Adonis and The Missing Link. After joining the Heenan Family, Bundy feuded extensively with André the Giant, a feud which started during an angle where Bundy interfered in one of André's matches and delivered several splashes, giving the Giant a broken sternum. They feuded for several months, including a pair of tag team matches on Saturday Night's Main Event II and III in late 1985, where Bundy, and André's other nemesis, Big John Studd, first faced André and Tony Atlas and then André and WWF World Heavyweight Champion Hulk Hogan. On September 23, 1985, Bundy faced André the Giant at Madison Square Garden in a match billed as "the Colossal Jostle". André dominated the match, with the match ending after Big John Studd came from the locker rooms to Bundy's aid and attacked the Giant, causing a disqualification. Bundy also began targeting Hogan and the WWF World Championship in late 1985. At Saturday Night's Main Event V, Hogan was dominating challenger Don Muraco when Bundy (with Heenan in tow) ran to ambush Hogan. With Muraco's help, Bundy repeatedly gave Hogan avalanches and big splashes, which caused Hogan to severely bruise his ribs. Bundy demanded a match and claimed Hogan was afraid of him, setting up their feud. Hogan demanded revenge and agreed to a steel cage match for the WWF World Heavyweight Championship as the main event of WrestleMania 2 in the Los Angeles Memorial Sports Arena portion of the event, which Hogan won.

==== Various feuds (1986–1988) ====
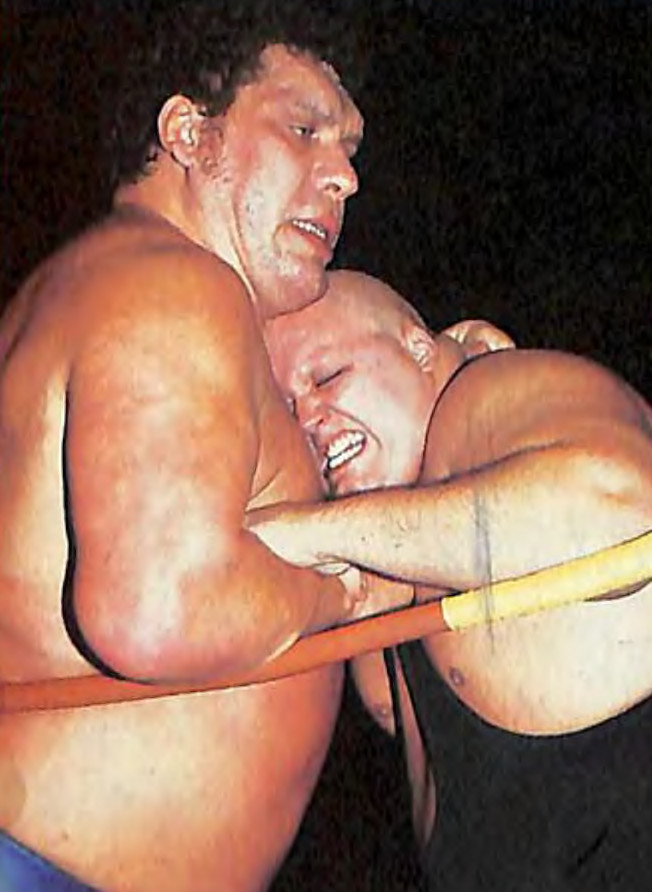
Bundy (right) wrestling André the Giant in 1986

Later in 1986, Bundy reformed his tag-team partnership with Studd and began a feud with The Machines, Bill Eadie and Blackjack Mulligan wrestling under masks (as the Super Machine and Big Machine, respectively) and often joined by André the Giant (as the Giant Machine). The storyline was that Bundy and Studd, along with Heenan, claimed that the Giant Machine was a masked André the Giant, and was competing under the mask and alias to circumvent an earlier suspension (due to no-showing for an event), but none of them ever proved that André and the Giant Machine were one and the same. Eventually, Bundy and Studd began teaming up with Heenan in a series of six-man tag team matches against the Machines (usually, Big and Super; as André's health was starting to deteriorate at this time, the Giant Machine made occasional appearances, but more often than not, it was either Captain Lou Albano or a number of popular faces—often, Hogan, Roddy Piper and others—who teamed with the other Machines). Bundy and Studd were regularly beaten, but won their last match over the Super-Big version of the Machines at Madison Square Garden. Also in the latter half of 1986, Bundy and Studd received shots at the WWF Tag Team Championship against The British Bulldogs, but were unsuccessful, often losing by disqualification. Studd left the WWF shortly after their last match with the Machines, and Bundy went back to singles competition.

At WrestleMania III, Bundy was involved in a mixed six-man tag team match, teaming up with midget wrestlers Little Tokyo and Lord Littlebrook against Hillbilly Jim, the Haiti Kid and Little Beaver. During the match, after being pestered by Beaver, Bundy body-slammed him and delivered a big elbow, causing his team's disqualification and his own tag partners to turn against him. Due to the elbow drop, Beaver suffered a back injury which forced him to retire from professional wrestling. In a 1998 interview Bundy said he hoped that he wasn't responsible for Giroux's early death, saying he wouldn't want that on his conscience. At the 1987 King of the Ring on September 4, Bundy made it to the finals of the King of the Ring tournament, where he was defeated by Randy Savage. In November 1987, Bundy defeated Hulk Hogan via a count-out on an episode of Saturday Night's Main Event XIII, but lost to Hogan in a rematch on the next episode of the series; the match was best known for the referee becoming legitimately injured when he was accidentally caught between Hogan and a charging Bundy, and André the Giant's post-match attack of Hogan shortly after Bundy left ringside.

Although no longer appearing on the WWF's syndicated television shows, Bundy continued to wrestle house shows in early 1988 (often losing to Bam Bam Bigelow); his last match during his initial WWF run was a televised match at Madison Square Garden in February 1988, teaming up with Butch Reed in a loss to Don Muraco and Ultimate Warrior.

=== Semi-retirement (1988–1994) ===
After leaving the WWF in 1988, Bundy went into semi-retirement, wrestling only a handful of matches. In 1993, he wrestled in the main event of Eastern Championship Wrestling's inaugural November to Remember supercard, appearing as the mystery tag team partner of Terry Funk in a losing effort against Road Warrior Hawk and Sabu. On May 13, 1994, Bundy defeated Papa Shango at NWA New Jersey. In the summer of 1994, he made a couple of appearances for United States Wrestling Association and also feuded with "Friendly" Frank Finnegan in the WWA in 1994.

=== World Wrestling Federation (1994–1995) ===
Bundy returned to the WWF in the fall of 1994 as a member of Ted DiBiase's stable, the Million Dollar Corporation. He had a successful pay-per-view return at Survivor Series, when he and fellow "Million Dollar Team" member Bam Bam Bigelow survived a match against Lex Luger's "Guts and Glory" team. Bundy was then billed as a favorite in the 1995 Royal Rumble, but lasted only three minutes before being eliminated by another big man, Mabel. Bundy made his return to WrestleMania at WrestleMania XI, where he was defeated by the Undertaker, Bundy was later pushed down the card before being released in October 1995 after teaming with Kama losing to Bam Bam Bigelow and Henry O. Godwinn in a dark match at a WWF Superstars of Wrestling taping.

=== Late career (1995–2007) ===
After leaving the WWF in late 1995, Bundy wrestled for several independent promotions in the United States including the WWA where he had wrestled in 1994. In April 1997, he resurfaced in magazines when he joined a faction managed by Kenny Casanova called "Camp Casanova" along with "Danger" Dave DeJohn and the Masked Maniac at times in USWF, NBW, and USA Power Pro Wrestling. In a match against "the Seven Foot Tall" Primo Canera III, Bundy knee-dropped his opponent and then "Bundy-splashed" him. The impact actually broke the ring, leaving the two grapplers in a pit in the center of the squared circle. This independent footage was picked up by Pro Wrestling Illustrated. His feuds against "Superfly" Jimmy Snuka, Doink the Clown, and Tom Brandi were among many main events in the northeast independent circuit. In 1999, at the Kolf Arena in Oshkosh, Wisconsin he won the AWA Superstars of Wrestling Heavyweight Championship from Jonnie Stewart. Later that same year, Bundy the reigning AWA heavyweight champion, wrestled again headlining an AWA "Super Event" at the Dee Events Center in Ogden, Utah. That night ended differently for Bundy, losing a "body-slam match" to Koszmar Polski who was managed by Ken Patera. Bundy still wrestled across the country, primarily in the Southern and Eastern United States. He generally continued to be a headliner and a crowd favorite at all events he attended. Bundy defeated Richard Byrne in May 2007 at Big Time Wrestling in Springfield, Massachusetts in which was also his last and final match of his wrestling career.

== Acting and stand-up comedy career ==
In 1986, Pallies appeared in television commercials and print advertisements for the Vendex HeadStart personal computer. Bundy had two guest spots and one big part on Married... with Children, as the creators had named the lead characters "Bundy" as an homage to him. In 1987, he played Uncle Irwin, the brother of Peggy Bundy. In 1995, he appeared again as the King Kong Bundy character, teaching Bud how to wrestle. In 1988, he appeared in the Richard Pryor film Moving as Gorgo, part of a trio of ex-cons who are insolent and careless movers. In 1996, he appeared on an episode of Weird Science as himself. He is on the cover of Belgian band Belgian Asociality's 2009 album Kabaal. On April 24, 2008, he was on a Norwegian TV show called Golden GOAL!. Bundy also starred as Otto Belmar in the 2011 independent film Fight the Panda Syndicate.

After retiring from wrestling, Pallies would also try a career in stand-up comedy. He would perform regularly at various comedy clubs such as the Coffee Dot Comedy in Sea Isle City.

== Personal life ==
Pallies was previously married and had a stepson named David that Pallies raised as his own. Pallies was fond of cats and had around ten at the time of his death.

In July 2016, Pallies joined a class action lawsuit filed against WWE which alleged that wrestlers incurred "long term neurological injuries" and that the company "routinely failed to care" for them and "fraudulently misrepresented and concealed" the nature and extent of those injuries. The suit was litigated by attorney Konstantine Kyros, who has been involved in a number of other lawsuits against WWE. The case was dismissed by US District Judge Vanessa Lynne Bryant in September 2018. Anthony Mango of Bleacher Report wrote that Pallies had a strained relationship with WWE over the years and his involvement in the lawsuit likely prevented the company from inducting him into their Hall of Fame.

=== Death ===
On March 4, 2019, Pallies died of complications from diabetes at his home in Glassboro, New Jersey, at the age of 63.

== Filmography ==
Film
Year	Film	Role	Notes
1988	Moving	Gorgo	
2002	Bill's Seat	Big Swede	Short film
2010	Card Subject to Change	Himself	Documentary film
2011	Fight the Panda Syndicate	Otto Belmar	
Television
Year	Title	Role	Notes
1987, 1995	Married... with Children	Uncle Irwin/Himself	Episodes: "All in the Family", "Flight of the Bumblebee"
1996	Weird Science	Himself	Episode: "Men in Tights"
1998	Boy Meets World	Himself	1 episode
2008	Golden Goal	Himself	1 episode
2014	The Swerve	Himself	Episode: "King Kong Bundy"

== Championships and accomplishments ==
- AWA Superstars of Wrestling
  - AWA Superstars of Wrestling Heavyweight Championship (1 time)
- Continental Wrestling Association
  - NWA/AWA Southern Heavyweight Championship (1 time)
  - NWA/AWA Southern Tag Team Championship (1 time) – with Rick Rude
- Georgia Championship Wrestling
  - NWA National Tag Team Championship (1 time) – with The Masked Superstar
- International Pro Wrestling
  - IPW Heavyweight Championship (1 time)
- International Wrestling Superstars
  - IWS United States Championship (1 time)
- Maryland Championship Wrestling
  - MCW Heavyweight Championship (1 time)
- Memphis Wrestling Hall of Fame
  - Class of 2022
- Midwest Championship Wrestling
  - MCW Championship (1 time)
- NWA New York
  - NWA New York Heavyweight Championship (1 time)
- Pro Wrestling Illustrated
  - Ranked No. 147 of the top 500 wrestlers in the PWI 500 in 1995
  - Ranked No. 124 of the top 500 wrestlers during the PWI Years in 2003
- Richmond Championship Wrestling
  - RCW Heavyweight Championship (1 time)
- Top Rope Wrestling
  - TRW Heavyweight Championship (1 time)
- World Class Championship Wrestling
  - NWA American Heavyweight Championship (2 times)
  - NWA American Tag Team Championship (2 times) – with Bill Irwin (1) and Bugsy McGraw (1)
- World Wide Wrestling Alliance
  - WWWA Heavyweight Championship (1 time)
- World Wrestling Federation
  - Slammy Award (2 times)
    - Bobby "The Brain" Heenan Scholarship Award (1987) with Haku, Tama, André the Giant, Hercules, and Harley Race
    - Most Evolutionary (1994) – Tied with Gorilla Monsoon

== See also ==
- List of premature professional wrestling deaths
