= Meatball (wrestler) =

American professional wrestler (born 1970)

Personal information
- Born: Richard Ellinger; September 27, 1970 (age 56) River Grove, Illinois, United States
- Website: www.mcwusa.us

Professional wrestling career
- Ring name(s): The Giant Midget; The World's Monster Midget; Meatball
- Billed height: 4 ft 6 in (1.37 m)
- Billed weight: 292 lb (132 kg)
- Trained by: Nate Webb; Pat Tanaka
- Debut: 2001

Richard Ellinger (born September 27, 1970), better known by his ring name Meatball, is an American professional wrestler who is signed to Micro Championship Wrestling.

== Early life ==
Ellinger was born in River Grove, Illinois, United States. His father, Richard Ellinger (1938-2020), was of German descent, and his mother, Frances Schmidt (1942–2009), was of German-Italian descent. He has an elder sister, Valerie Caso (née Ellinger; born 1966), and two elder step-brothers, Thomas and Bill Morton, from his mother's second marriage to Earl Morton.

Ellinger's mother and sister worked in the administrative side of a food chain, while his father worked in a lumber yard. Both his father and sister are two inches shorter than he is.

Ellinger attended River Grove Rhodes Elementary School until 1985 and East Leyden High School until 1989. After he left school, he traveled through the United States, Europe and Japan, which led to him taking a job as a cargo handler for a local airline from 1990 until 2009.

== Professional wrestling career ==
Ellinger is 4 feet 6 inches tall, billed at weighing 292 lbs and adopts a brawler wrestling style.

In 2001, Ellinger received basic wrestling training from Nate Webb, made his ring debut and thereafter wrestled part-time on federations including National Wrestling Alliance (NWA), Total Nonstop Action Wrestling (TNA), Independent Wrestling Revolution (IWR) and World Wrestling All-Stars (WWA). In August 2009, he joined Micro Championship Wrestling (MCW) and subsequently received training from Pat Tanaka.

In May 2013, Ellinger returned full-time to his previous job as a cargo handler in between doing wrestling shows for MCW.

== Filmography ==
Year	Title	Role	Notes
2002	NWA: Total Nonstop Action	Meatball	1 episode: "#1.5"
2004	MWF: Midgets Invade Sturgis	Himself	
2011	Hulk Hogan's Micro Championship Wrestling	Himself	2 episodes: "Johnny on the Spot", "Half the Size Twice the Violence"
2011	Full Throttle Saloon	Himself	1 episode: "#3.4"

== Championships and accomplishments ==
- Micro Championship Wrestling
  - MCW Heavyweight Championship (2 times)

== See also ==
- Midget wrestling
