= Farmer Brooks =

Canadian professional wrestler (1957–2022)

Personal information
- Born: Clifford Fraser; October 10, 1957 New Glasgow, Nova Scotia, Canada
- Died: November 20, 2022 (aged 65) Halifax, Nova Scotia, Canada
- Spouse: Kim Hutt
- Children: 4
- Family: Stacia Fraser (mother)

Professional wrestling career
- Ring name: Farmer Brooks
- Trained by: Billy Watson
- Retired: 1992

Clifford Fraser (October 10, 1957 – November 20, 2022) was a Canadian professional wrestler, known as the midget wrestler Farmer Brooks. He was a major participant in Grand Prix Wrestling throughout the 1980s and a longtime rival of Sky Low Low.

== Professional wrestling career ==
Clifford Fraser moved to Rexdale in Toronto when he was growing up. He later dropped out of school and trained to become a professional wrestler under Whipper Billy Watson. He also was a member of Earl Sullivan's Sully's Gym, another wrestling program. During his career, his most prolonged rivalry was with Sky Low Low. He retired in 1992 when Grand Prix Wrestling closed.

== Personal life ==
After retiring from the wrestling business, Fraser began working in New Glasgow, Nova Scotia.

His mother's name is Stacia Fraser. He was married to Kim Hutt and had four children: Andrew, Leanna, Blair, and Shelby.

Fraser died on November 20, 2022, after a short illness.
