= Tiny the Terrible =

American professional wrestler

Personal information
- Born: Douglas Allen Tunstall Jr. August 19, 1967 (age 58) Providence, Rhode Island, U.S.

Professional wrestling career
- Ring name(s): Tiny the Terrible; Cloacas
- Billed height: 4 ft 7 in (1.40 m)

Douglas Allen Tunstall Jr. (born August 19, 1967), better known as Tiny the Terrible, is an American professional wrestler and politician. During his wrestling career, he appeared as an attraction on the independent circuit and made two appearances on WWF/E Raw. He stands 4 feet 7 inches (1.40 m) tall and is a former NWA World Midget's Champion. In 2006, Tunstall unsuccessfully ran for mayor of Pawtucket, Rhode Island. His campaign was the subject of A Man Among Giants, a documentary film directed by Rod Webber.

== Personal life ==
Douglas Allen Tunstall Jr. was born in Providence, Rhode Island, on August 19, 1967. Tunstall is a dwarf who stands at 4 feet, 7 inches tall. His father was a Vietnam War veteran of normal height, though Tunstall says his mother was shorter than he is. In 1985, Tunstall graduated from Central High School in Providence, where he partook in scholastic wrestling and claims to have won the majority of his matches in the 98-to-105-pound class. He subsequently earned an associate's degree from Community College of Rhode Island and took science-related classes at Rhode Island College.

Tunstall began a career in professional wrestling in the 1990s. His notoriety in wrestling led to multiple appearances as a guest on The Jerry Springer Show. He also worked seasonally for KB Toys, where he would portray a Christmas elf. In 2006, he said he had been receiving Social Security Disability Insurance since 1995. He estimates his income to be $10,000 a year.

== Professional wrestling career ==
Tunstall performs as a professional wrestler under the moniker "Tiny the Terrible". He often made appearances on the independent circuit in the northeastern United States, including New England Championship Wrestling. Tunstall and his brother Half Nelson, a fellow dwarf wrestler, would perform against 350 lb Erich "Mass Transit" Kulas. The three caught the attention of Extreme Championship Wrestling (ECW) owner Paul Heyman, who invited them to appear at an ECW house show in 1996. This led to the Mass Transit Incident, which occurred after Kulas canceled his showcase with Tunstall to replace the absent Axl Rotten in a tag-team match against The Gangstas. Kulas was severely injured during the subsequent match, suffering two severed arteries in a botched blading from New Jack. In a 2020 episode of Dark Side of the Ring on New Jack, Tunstall recounted feeling resentment over Kulas abandoning him and his brother to take a higher profile match. He defeated Half Nelson for the NWA World Midget's Championship in 1998 and held it for 167 days, before dropping it to Little Killer.

Tunstall made two appearances on WWF/E Raw; he revealed in Dark Side of the Ring that New Jack secured the appearances for him in exchange for helping New Jack be acquitted of assault and battery charges against Kulas. On the March 13, 2000, episode of Raw, he appeared as one half of "The Twin Towers", a dwarf duo that Stephanie McMahon joked would face The Rock at WrestleMania 2000. He wrestled his only WWE match on the July 25, 2005, episode of Raw under the ring name Cloacas, where he teamed with Viscera to take on Antonio of The Heart Throbs and Pocket Rocket in a winning effort.

== Political career ==
He is a member of the Republican Party, which he says has made him unpopular with his friends. He supported George W. Bush during his presidency. In 2004, he protested at the Democratic National Convention and told a New York Times reporter that any platform that promised to give people under five feet tall $1,200 a month would capture the dwarf demographic.

Tunstall ran for mayor of Pawtucket, Rhode Island, in 2006. His candidacy made him the first African-American to seek the office. He ran against the well-funded eight-year Democratic incumbent James Doyle, and stated he would use "ghetto-style politics" such as door-to-door campaigning. His platform included opposing same-sex marriage, encouraging NASA to build a base in Pawtucket and giving stipends to those who took in homeless people. Ultimately, Tunstall lost the election after only collecting 17 percent of the vote.

His candidacy was the subject of the documentary film, A Man Among Giants. After the completion of the film, Tunstall was arrested for making threats to public officials. The film's director Rod Webber bailed him out of jail, and Tunstall was subsequently committed to a mental hospital.

== Championships and accomplishments ==
- National Wrestling Alliance
  - NWA World Midget's Championship (1 time)
