= Boombox Saints =

Canadian hip hop and R&B group

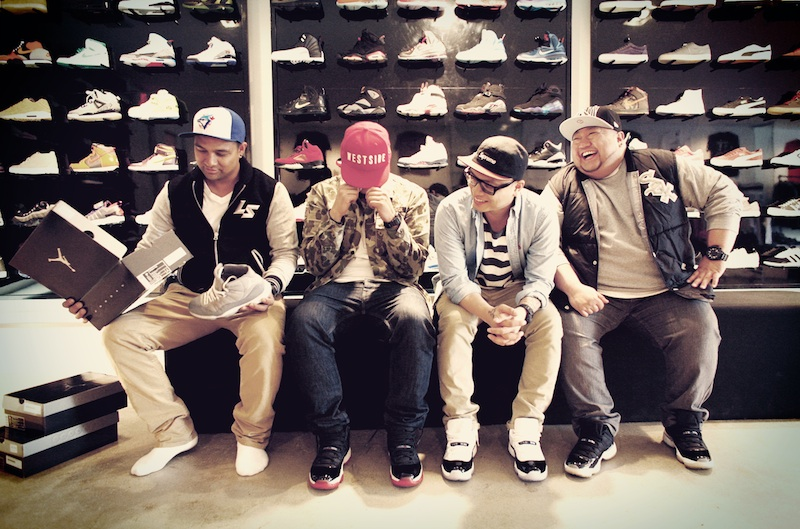

Background information
- Origin: Vancouver, British Columbia, Canada
- Genres: Hip hop, R&B
- Years active: 2008–2014
- Members: Freeky P (J.P. Pascual); Adlib; Huggy Fresh† (Geoffrey Rarama); DJ Relik

Boombox Saints was a hip hop and R&B group based in Vancouver, British Columbia, Canada. The band officially formed in 2008 taking their name from the 1990s film Boondock Saints. Within four years, Boombox Saints released two EPs, The Boombox EP and Bringin' the Boom Back: Based on a True Story as well as a full-length debut album titled For the Moment. They shared stages with successful and respected acts including J. Cole, Kid Cudi, Big Sean, Mos Def, Jay Electronica, Talib Kweli, Souls of Mischief, Far East Movement, Danny Fernandes, and Sean Paul.

== Career ==
=== The Boombox EP (2008–2010) ===
Consisting of emcees Freeky P and Huggy Fresh, vocalist Adlib and DJ Relik, Boombox Saints released their debut EP The Boombox EP featuring the singles Flip It and She Got on November 9, 2010. After winning the Urban Music Association of Canada's Urban X-posure Triple Threat competition in 2009, the band received a singles digital deal with Nettwerk Music Group for She Got. Soon after, the music video for She Got received support from MuchVibe and Aux TV.

=== Bringin' the Boom Back: Based on a True Story (2010–2012) ===
On March 8, 2011, the band self-released their follow up work Bringin' the Boom Back: Based on a True Story. Intended as a tribute to the era of 1990s R&B and hip hop that had helped craft the band's sound, Bringin' the Boom Back: Based on a True Story featured four singles: "Bringin' the Boom Back", "Gotta Let You Know", "Late Night Creep", and "The Break Up Song". "Bringin' the Boom Back" was produced by fellow Vancouverite K-Rec who remixed "It's Tricky" by Run-D.M.C., which soon became the title track for the Electronic Arts video game SSX Tricky. The band uploaded the EP as a free download on their website and have also shared a complete collection of their work on DatPiff.

The band spent much of 2011 and early 2012 playing select cities across Canada, showcasing at North by Northeast and Canadian Music Week while recording their debut full length.

Preceding the release of their debut album, the band released two singles: the Michael Jordan inspired "Gametime" and "She Looks Like". Both tracks, like the band's previous works, were made available as free downloads via the band's website.

=== For the Moment (2012) ===
The group released their debut album For the Moment on October 23, 2012. Freeky P described the album as "a post-modern, modern epic love tale of our collective lives tracked by a new-stalgic soundscape, detailing the joys and falls of relationships in the never ending chase of happiness. In short, walk 14 songs of our lives and you'll forever be changed". This explains the album cover, a pair of worn out Jordan Concord '11s originally belonging to Adlib. Further still, emcee Huggy Fresh has claimed that the album is "as outside the box as a fresh pair of J's". For the Moment features guest appearances from long time friends Emmalyn Estrada ("Blind", "Peekaboo Style") and Jenilee Reyes ("For You") as well as up and coming Vancouver singer/songwriter Vanessa Villabroza ("By My Side").

Following its release, music critic Stuart Derdeyn of The Province touted the album as "one of the more solid hip-hop releases to ever come out of town (Vancouver)" and the Vancouver Sun′s Francois Marchand added that For the Moment "is a reminder of the kind of heartfelt soul that rap can really deliver." It was featured in Postmedia Network outlets across Canada and received support from Exclaim!, CBC Music, Earshot Magazine, Hip Hop Canada, The National Post, Canada.com, Dose.ca, BeatRoute Magazine, VancouverIsAwesome.com, WinnieCooper.net and The Snipe News.

On November 13, 2012, For the Moment debuted on the National Campus and Community Radio Association's Earshot Charts at #5 on the National Hip Hop Top 10. Two weeks later, the album became #1 on the National Hip Hop Top 10 as determined by airplay from campus and community radio stations across Canada. The band's debut remained #1 on the National Hip Hop Top 10 charts for three consecutive weeks from November 27 through December 11, 2012.

In an interview with BeatRoute Magazine, the band said that they intended to shoot ten music videos for tracks from For the Moment and planned to tour extensively in 2013. However, the band appears to have broken up by 2014.

According to his website, Freeky P (J.P. Pascual) is still performing, co-founded JYRATE, Vancouver's only strictly Afrobeat night, and has started a t-shirt design company. He does not mention Boombox Saints in his biography. As of Sept 2021, DJ Relik is still performing and has started a school for DJs in the Vancouver area; it does not mention Boombox Saints in its credentials. Huggy Fresh† (Geoffrey Rarama) died in April 2017, at age 36.

== Discography ==
=== Albums ===
- For the Moment (2012)

=== EPs ===
- The Boombox EP (2010)
- Bringin' the Boom Back: Based on a True Story (2011)

=== Singles ===
- "Flip It" (2010)
- "She Got" (2010)
- "Bringin' the Boom Back" (2011)
- "Gotta Let You Know" (2011)
- "Late Night Creep" (2011)
- "The Break Up Song" (2012)
- "Gametime" (2012)
- "She Looks Like" (2012)
- "For the Moment" (2012)

== Critical reception ==
- "(Boombox Saints) are in the top 10 hip hop artists you should see at NxNE (2011)" - MuchMusic
- "Boombox Saints are untouchable" - Hip Hop Canada
- "They are the voice of a new generation of Hip Hop." - Shelley Gummeson, Earshot Magazine
- "Packed full of stylized rhymes and perfect party beats, For The Moment is an album worth your time." - Jamie Goyman, Beatroute Magazine
- "(For The Moment) easily one of the more solid hip-hop releases to ever come out of town (Vancouver)" - Stuart Derdeyn, The Province
- "…the album is a reminder of the kind of heartfelt soul that rap can really deliver" - Francois Marchand, Vancouver Sun
- "As far as R&B-infused hip-hop goes, this is a release that Vancouver deserves" - Discorder Magazine
- "…going by the quality on For The Moment, they (Boombox Saints) will be headlining their own shows soon enough" - The Snipe News
