= WrestleMania III =

1987 World Wrestling Federation pay-per-view event

- Promotional poster featuring Hulk Hogan and André the Giant
- Promotion: World Wrestling Federation
- Date: March 29, 1987
- City: Pontiac, Michigan
- Venue: Pontiac Silverdome
- Attendance: 78,000
- Tagline: Bigger! Better! Badder!

Pay-per-view chronology
← Previous; WrestleMania 2	Next → Survivor Series

WrestleMania chronology
← Previous; 2	Next → IV

WrestleMania III was a 1987 professional wrestling pay-per-view (PPV) event produced by the World Wrestling Federation (WWF, renamed WWE in 2002). It was the third annual WrestleMania and was held on March 29, 1987, at the Pontiac Silverdome in Pontiac, Michigan. There were 12 matches, with the main event featuring Hulk Hogan successfully defending the WWF World Heavyweight Championship against André the Giant.

WWF claimed that the paid attendance was 93,173, which would have made it the largest crowd for a WWF event as well as the largest recorded attendance of a live indoor event in North America at the time; however, retrospective analysis of the event have determined the actual attendance to be around 78,000. The event is considered to be the pinnacle of the 1980s wrestling boom, with almost one million fans watching the event at 160 closed-circuit locations in North America and the number of people watching via pay-per-view estimated at several million. The WWF generated US$1.6 million in ticket sales, and pay-per-view revenue was estimated at $10.3 million, setting a record for the time. The promotion's only event with an official higher attendance was WrestleMania 32, held at AT&T Stadium in 2016. The record for the largest indoor event stood until January 27, 1999, when it was surpassed by the papal mass with Pope John Paul II at the TWA Dome in St. Louis, Missouri, which drew an audience of 104,000.

The event garnered positive reviews, with the main event bout between Hogan and André being called one of the most iconic matches of all time, though it received criticism for its overall quality. Additionally, the bout for the Intercontinental Championship between Ricky Steamboat and Randy Savage gained critical acclaim, with many highlighting it as one of the greatest wrestling matches of all time.

== Production ==
=== Background ===
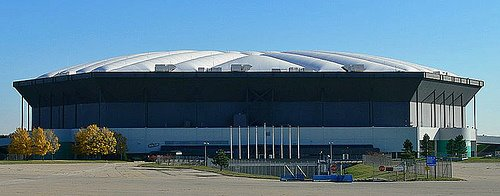
The third annual WrestleMania was held at the Pontiac Silverdome in Pontiac, Michigan.

WrestleMania is considered the World Wrestling Federation's (WWF, renamed WWE in 2002) flagship professional wrestling pay-per-view (PPV) event, having first been held in 1985. It is held annually between mid-March to mid-April. Unlike the previous year's WrestleMania 2, WrestleMania III was only scheduled to be held at one location: the Pontiac Silverdome in Pontiac, Michigan on March 29, 1987.

=== Storylines ===
Like the previous WrestleMania events, WrestleMania III was promoted for several months in advance. The main feud stemmed from André the Giant's heel turn and betrayal of his friend, the WWF World Heavyweight Champion Hulk Hogan, which began on an episode of Piper's Pit when WWF President Jack Tunney presented Hogan with a trophy for being the WWF World Heavyweight Champion for three years. André, Hogan's good friend, came out to congratulate him but cryptically remarked: "Three years to be a champion, it's a long time". A week later on another episode of Piper's Pit, Tunney presented André with a visibly smaller trophy for being "undefeated in the WWF for 15 years", and Hogan came out to congratulate André. But before The Giant could speak, Hogan ended up being the focal point of the interview. Annoyed by this, André stormed out during Hogan's congratulation speech. A week later on yet another Piper's Pit segment, Jesse Ventura hinted he knew something about André, but wasn't telling. This infuriated Piper and the two nearly came to blows before Ventura asserted that he could produce André the next week, asking Piper, "Can you produce Hogan?". Piper agreed and nervously asked Hogan later on, who agreed. The following week, Hogan was on Piper's Pit first when André walked out with Bobby Heenan, a long-time adversary of Hogan and André. Heenan announced himself to be André's new manager. André then challenged Hogan to a title match at WrestleMania III and attacked Hogan, ripping off Hogan's T-shirt and crucifix necklace thus causing Hogan to bleed.

Another main feud leading up to the event was between Ricky Steamboat and the Intercontinental Heavyweight Champion "Macho Man" Randy Savage. The feud began during a title match between the two when Savage attacked Steamboat as he greeted fans at ringside. Savage then pushed Steamboat over the security rail and delivered an elbow shot that thrust Steamboat's throat into the rail and dropped the ring bell onto his throat from the top rope, injuring his larynx and sending him to the hospital. This resulted in a long, bitter feud that lasted for six months, included several bloody match-ups, and finally culminated at WrestleMania. George Steele was in Steamboat's corner, having developed a crush on Savage's valet, Miss Elizabeth.

Billy Jack Haynes and Hercules' feud started when Bobby Heenan continuously taunted Haynes, telling him that Hercules was the real master of Haynes' finishing move, the full nelson; which came to a boiling point when Hercules attacked Haynes on an edition of Superstars of Wrestling, which led to their match at WrestleMania. This battle was advertised as the "Full Nelson Challenge."

Another heated feud leading up to this event was between Harley Race and the Junkyard Dog. When the WWF Wrestling Classic became the King of the Ring tournament, Harley Race went on to win the tournament and began referring to himself as "King" Harley Race, coming to the ring in a royal crown and cape to the ceremonial accompaniment of the classical music piece, "Great Gates of Kiev" by Modest Mussorgsky. After each of his victories, Race would force his defeated opponent to bow and kneel before him. Usually, Race's manager, Bobby Heenan, forced the defeated opponent to bow and kneel by grabbing their hair. Junkyard Dog protested Race's self-proclaimed monarchy in the WWF and stated there would never be a complete ruler in the WWF, which led to a match on Saturday Night's Main Event IX, in which the King and his manager both tried to make Junkyard Dog bow for them. This set the stage for the WrestleMania match, which included the stipulation that the loser had to bow to the winner.

On January 26, 1987, The British Bulldogs lost the WWF Tag Team Championship to The Hart Foundation in a match that saw the Dynamite Kid so debilitated with a back injury that he was virtually carried to the ring by Davey Boy Smith and did not see any physical activity after being knocked out by the Harts' manager, Jimmy Hart, who had hit him with his megaphone as the match began. Danny Davis was the referee and allowed The Hart Foundation to use illegal double-team maneuvers. After being given some time off for Dynamite to recuperate, the Bulldogs continued their rivalry with The Hart Foundation when they teamed up with Tito Santana against the Foundation and the referee-turned-wrestler Danny Davis in a six-man tag team match at WrestleMania III. The match was billed as a revenge match with Santana's inclusion due to Davis being the referee in the Boston Garden in early 1986 when Santana had lost the Intercontinental title to the Macho Man, who used a foreign object to get the win.

Rock singer and Detroit native Alice Cooper was in Jake Roberts' corner during his match with The Honky Tonk Man managed by Jimmy Hart. The Honky Tonk Man had attacked Roberts with a guitar on Roberts' interview segment, The Snake Pit, which legitimately injured Roberts' neck. This event began Roberts' turn into a babyface as well as the feud between the wrestlers, which culminated in their WrestleMania match.

The feud between Adrian Adonis and Roddy Piper began when, following a leave of absence from the WWF in mid-1986, Piper returned to find his Piper's Pit segment replaced by The Flower Shop, a segment hosted by then-effeminate wrestler Adrian Adonis. Piper, who returned as a face, spent weeks crashing Adonis' show and trading insults, leading to a showdown between the two segments that ended with Piper being assaulted and humiliated by Adonis, Piper's former bodyguard Bob Orton, and Don Muraco. The trio left Piper with his face covered in red lipstick, lying in the middle of the remnants of the destroyed Piper's Pit set. In response, Piper stormed the set of Adonis' show and destroyed it with a baseball bat. This led to their Hair vs. Hair match at WrestleMania III, which was billed as Piper's retirement match from wrestling before becoming a full-time actor.

== Event ==
Other on-screen personnel
Role:	Name:
Commentators	Gorilla Monsoon
Commentators	Jesse Ventura
Commentators	Bob Uecker (Mixed Tag Team Match and 6-man tag team match)
Commentators	Mary Hart (Six-man tag team match)
Commentators	Bobby Heenan (Rougeaus/Dream Team match)
Interviewers	Gene Okerlund
Interviewers	Vince McMahon
Interviewers	Bob Uecker
Interviewers	Mary Hart
Ring announcers	Howard Finkel
Ring announcers	Bob Uecker (Main Event)
Referees	John Bonello
Referees	Dave Hebner
Referees	Jack Kruger
Referees	Jack Lotz
Referees	Joey Marella
Timekeeper	Mary Hart
Supporting	Alice Cooper (in Jake Roberts' corner)
Vocalist	Aretha Franklin

WWF owner Vince McMahon claims that as he was about to announce "Welcome to WrestleMania III," he felt the spirit of his father Vincent J. McMahon, who had died three years earlier. After McMahon welcomed the audience, he introduced Aretha Franklin, who opened the show singing a rendition of "America the Beautiful."

The first match of the night was The Can-Am Connection (Rick Martel and Tom Zenk) versus Bob Orton Jr. and The Magnificent Muraco (with Mr. Fuji). This match ended when Martel gave Muraco a high cross-body with Zenk on his hands and knees giving Muraco what Gorilla Monsoon called "A little high school trip from behind" allowing Martel to get the win for his team.

The next match that aired was Hercules (with Bobby Heenan in his corner) against Billy Jack Haynes in the "Full Nelson Challenge." The match ended when Haynes locked Hercules in the full nelson outside the ring and both were counted out. After the match, Heenan assaulted Haynes by kneeing him in the back after Haynes had applied the full nelson to Hercules outside the ring. Haynes then chased Heenan into the ring, where Hercules blindsided Haynes with his chain, hitting him a number of times before locking a bloodied Haynes into his own full nelson.

The Mixed Tag Team Match between King Kong Bundy and his professional wrestling midget team of Lord Littlebrook and Little Tokyo against Hillbilly Jim and his own team of the Haiti Kid and Little Beaver was next. The rules were that only midgets could fight midgets and that neither Bundy nor Hillbilly was allowed to attack the midgets, though at one point, Bundy tagged in and Little Beaver refused to tag out immediately, even hitting the 458 lb (208 kg) "Walking condominium" with a dropkick to no effect before bailing with a tag to Hillbilly Jim. King Kong Bundy's team was disqualified when Bundy attacked Little Beaver because Bundy was not supposed to be in the ring with the midgets. After Beaver had attacked Bundy on occasion during the match, he finally got caught and Bundy attacked Little Beaver, hitting him with a body slam before dropping an elbow across his chest.

The "Loser Must Bow" match between the Junkyard Dog and Harley Race (with Bobby Heenan and The Fabulous Moolah) followed. Prior to the match, Gene Okerlund interviewed Heenan, Race, and Moolah backstage, where Moolah predicted that Junkyard Dog would have to bow to the King as he is supposed to do. Bobby then gave Moolah the crown and told her to put it on the King's head after the match, "As only the Queen of Wrestling can do". Junkyard Dog came out to the ring to a big ovation in the Silverdome. During the match, the two battled back and forth, with Race even trying unsuccessfully to give the prone Dog a falling headbutt which naturally failed. Following this, Race recovered enough to give the Junkyard Dog a belly to belly suplex when he was distracted by Bobby Heenan to get the win. Due to the pre-match stipulation, JYD did a little bow and then hit Race from the blindside with a steel chair to a rousing ovation from the crowd. After attacking Race, Junkyard Dog took the King's royal robe and left the ring with it in hand to a standing ovation.

The next match was The Dream Team (Brutus Beefcake and Greg Valentine), with Luscious Johnny V and Canadian strongman Dino Bravo in their corner, against The Fabulous Rougeau Brothers (Jacques and Raymond). Ray Rougeau started off the match by locking up with Beefcake. The two men later tagged out, and Valentine brawled with Jacques Rougeau as Bravo looked on from the outside of the ring. Raymond performed a sleeper hold on Valentine and was followed by Beefcake jumping off the ropes and accidentally hitting The Hammer with a double axe handle. The Rougeau Brothers gave Valentine a double team move, but the referee was arguing with Beefcake. The match ended when Dino Bravo jumped off the top rope and hit Raymond while he was pinning Valentine, then rolling Valentine on top of him for the win. The Dream Team argued for most of the match, which led to Valentine, Bravo and Luscious Johnny departing together, without Beefcake.

Footage of an interview with Rowdy Roddy Piper was aired as Piper made his way to the ring to face Adrian Adonis, who was accompanied by Jimmy Hart, in Piper's retirement match. Piper and Adonis began the match by attacking each other with Piper's belt. Adonis put a sleeper hold on Piper in the middle of the ring and released the hold prior to Piper's arm going down for a 3rd time, thinking that he won the match. When Jimmy Hart got in the ring to celebrate with Adonis, Brutus Beefcake came to the ring to help Piper recover, and Piper attacked Adonis and performed a sleeper hold of his own. Piper got the victory, and after the match was over, Brutus got in the ring and cut Adrian Adonis' hair as Piper held Jimmy Hart down. After being woken by Beefcake and seeing himself in the mirror he had brought to the ring that Piper was holding, Adonis hit the mirror and chased Piper around the ring before leaving the ring in embarrassment with Hart using his jacket to cover Adonis' head.

Up next was a six-man tag team match featuring former referee Danny Davis (in his debut as a WWF wrestler) and The Hart Foundation (Bret Hart and Jim Neidhart) against The British Bulldogs (Dynamite Kid and Davey Boy Smith) and Tito Santana with Matilda the Bulldog in their corner. As a referee, Davis' bias towards heel wrestlers had led to the Bulldogs losing the tag titles to the Harts and also led to Santana losing the WWF Intercontinental Heavyweight Championship to Randy Savage. The Bulldogs had many near-falls, yet Neidhart broke up most of them. After all three members of the Bulldogs/Santana team had gotten a measure of revenge on Davis, all six wrestlers ended up brawling in the ring. Danny Davis recovered and hit Davey Boy with Jimmy Hart's megaphone and pinned him for the win.

Butch Reed, making his pay-per-view debut, against Koko B. Ware, was the following match. Reed won the match with a rollup, (and a handful of tights), after a high cross-body from Koko. After the contest, Reed's manager Slick got in the ring and attacked Koko B. Ware with his cane, but Tito Santana quickly rushed to the ring and stopped Slick, and ripped some of his clothes off. Slick retreated as Reed got back in the ring, only for Reed to get a double drop kick from Koko and Santana.

The next contest was a title match involving reigning WWF Intercontinental Heavyweight Champion, Randy Savage (with Miss Elizabeth) and Ricky Steamboat (with George Steele). The match itself lasted for nearly fifteen minutes. At one point, Savage was about to use the ring bell as a weapon, but was stopped by Steele, who knocked him off of the top rope. When Savage attempted to give Steamboat a scoop slam, Steamboat reversed it into a small package to get the win and become the new WWF Intercontinental Heavyweight Champion, marking the first time in WrestleMania history that the Intercontinental Heavyweight Championship changed hands. This match is considered by many to be one of the greatest matches in WWE history.

The tenth match of the night was between The Honky Tonk Man (with Jimmy Hart) and Jake Roberts, who along with his pet Python "Damien", had Detroit native Alice Cooper in his corner. When Jake went for the DDT, Honky Tonk Man's manager Jimmy Hart pulled Roberts' legs, and the Honky Tonk Man rolled up Roberts from behind, held on to the ropes, and pinned him for the win. After the match, Roberts narrowly missed hitting Honky with his own guitar, smashing it against a ring post and causing Honky to run off down the aisle, leaving Hart alone in the ring. Alice Cooper got in the ring and, with Roberts' holding Hart in a full nelson, attacked him with Roberts' python Damien.

Ring announcer Howard Finkel then introduced Gene Okerlund to the crowd. Okerlund then announced the reported attendance of the event, which set a new indoor-attendance record of 93,173.

The Iron Sheik and Nikolai Volkoff (with Slick) were in action next, against The Killer Bees (Jim Brunzell and B. Brian Blair). Slick asked all of the fans to rise and respect Nikolai Volkoff's singing of the Soviet National Anthem, and when Volkoff began singing, Jim Duggan came to the ring with his two-by-four, which had a tiny American flag attached to it, got on the microphone and said that Volkoff was not going to sing because America is the land of the free and the home of the brave. While the match ensued, Duggan stayed at ringside. When The Iron Sheik locked a camel clutch on Brunzell, Duggan, who was chasing Volkoff around the ring and finally into it, stopped and hit an unsuspecting Sheik across the back with his 2x4 in front of the referee, resulting in The Iron Sheik and Nikolai Volkoff winning the bout by disqualification.

=== Main event ===
André the Giant applying a bear hug to Hulk Hogan in their WWF World Heavyweight Championship match.

In what has since been billed as the "biggest main event in sports entertainment," the final match pitted WWF World Heavyweight Champion Hulk Hogan defending the title against André the Giant. Howard Finkel introduced the guest ring announcer, Bob Uecker, who in turn introduced the guest timekeeper, Entertainment Tonight host Mary Hart. The fans booed André heavily and pelted him and his manager Bobby Heenan with trash as they rode the cart to the ring. In contrast, Hogan, who walked to the ring, came out to a huge ovation. Approximately one minute into the match, Hogan attempted to bodyslam André, but was unable to lift The Giant and nearly lost when Andre fell on him and almost pinned him. After the match had battled back and forth, André gave Hogan an Irish whip to the far side of the ring and attempted a big boot on Hogan, but Hogan ducked it and came off the ropes to give André a clothesline to take him off his feet for the first time in the match. Hogan then "Hulked up" and scoop slammed the 525 lb (238 kg) Giant before hitting the ropes and executing his leg drop pin to get the win and retain the championship.

== Reception ==
The event has received positive reviews. In the years after WrestleMania III, the Savage vs. Steamboat match has been ranked by critics and other wrestlers as one of the greatest matches in professional wrestling. Pro Wrestling Illustrated and Wrestling Observer Newsletter named it 1987's Match of the Year. IGN ranked it at number 6 in their Top 20 Matches in WrestleMania History. Steamboat described the match as "the moment in time that defined me as a wrestler." Thomas Golianopoulos of Complex Sports ranked it at number two in his list of the 50 Greatest Matches in WrestleMania History, citing that "Both guys worked lightning fast and everything from Steamboat's aggressiveness to the involvement of George "The Animal" Steele played off their part." David Otunga picked it as WWE.com's Five-Star Match of the Week in December 19, 2012.

The main event between Hulk Hogan and André the Giant is regarded as one of the pivotal matches in the history of the WWE, with Hogan's body slam on André having become an iconic moment of both wrestlers' careers as well as of the 1980s professional wrestling boom overall. Despite its historic importance, the match was also criticized for its quality. At the time, it received a negative four star rating from Dave Meltzer and the Wrestling Observer Newsletter named it the "Worst Worked Match of the Year." Meltzer would later increase his rating to one star out of five. In 2020, 411Mania's Larry Csonka gave the match one star, stating "The match is not good in any way shape or form; but is one I completely appreciate for its historical importance." Kevin Pantoja, also a writer for 411Mania, gave the match two stars in 2019, stating "Technically, this isn't any good. However, I don't think it's nearly as bad as some people do". The match will be inducted into the 2026 WWE Hall of Fame in the Immortal Moment category.

There have been numerous claims that the quoted attendance figure of 93,173 — which established a world record attendance for an indoor event — was false and that the real attendance figure was only around 78,000. Meltzer pointed that 78,000 is attributed to Zane Bresloff, the local promoter for the event.

Officially, WrestleMania III remained highest-attended event in WWE history until surpassed by WrestleMania 32 in 2016, with an official figure of just over 101,000 in attendance. As with WrestleMania III, this figure has also been disputed, with subsequent analyses assessing the actual number between 93 and 94,000.

== Aftermath ==
Roddy Piper went on to film Hell Comes to Frogtown and They Live and made sporadic appearances on television before finally returning to host a Piper's Pit segment at WrestleMania V. Piper continued to be active in professional wrestling at various points for more than two decades. The first televised match between André and Hogan after WrestleMania III was on The Main Event I on NBC on February 5, 1988, drawing a record 33 million viewers, making it the most-watched match in North American professional wrestling history. The angle surrounding this match was that after winning the match, André ended Hogan's four-year reign as WWF champion with the help of a worked screwjob finish involving twin referees Earl and Dave Hebner. Their feud culminated in a rematch at WrestleMania IV as part of a tournament to crown a new champion (both ended up being disqualified during the match for using a steel chair in front of referee Joey Marella). The Hogan/Andre match at WrestleMania IV was the first-ever WrestleMania rematch.

Randy Savage continued to challenge Ricky Steamboat for the Intercontinental title in rematches at house shows across the country. Steamboat eventually lost the title to The Honky Tonk Man, and not long after, Savage became a face and feuded with Honky Tonk over the title. On September 4, 1987, Randy Savage won the King of the Ring by defeating King Kong Bundy.

Twenty years later, WrestleMania 23 celebrated WrestleMania III by returning to the Detroit metropolitan area, showing footage from WrestleMania III, having Aretha Franklin ("Who's Zoomin' Who?" by Franklin was the theme song to WrestleMania III) sing "America the Beautiful", and having Kane scoop slam The Great Khali. WrestleMania 23 had the highest buyrate of any WrestleMania in history, before getting beaten by WrestleMania XXVIII.

Fox Sports 1 later rebroadcast the event on May 12, 2020.

The event's Hogan/Andre match was inducted into the "Immortal Moment" wing of the 2026 WWE Hall of Fame by Jimmy Hart, with Hogan's son Nick and Andre's daughter Robin accepting the induction of their parents; both Andre and Hogan were by this point in time deceased.

== Home media and streaming ==
The event was released on VHS by Coliseum Video in the United States and in 1991 by Silver Vision in the United Kingdom during a period in which the WWF back catalogue was being re-released in the UK. The home video opens with a short feature hosted by Gene Okerlund covering the build up to the event.

In June 2004, it was re-released on DVD in the United Kingdom as part of Silver Vision's Tagged Classics range, and was paired with WrestleMania IV. This DVD set was not released in the USA.

A 'Championship Edition' of the event was released on DVD in 2007 to coincide with the twentieth anniversary. The two-disc set included pre-WrestleMania interviews and matches, including the battle royal from Saturday Night's Main Event X that Hercules won, and optional pop-up trivia facts about the event.

In 2014, the event was included on the WWE's streaming platform the WWE Network as part of its launch and remained on the service until the platform closed in 2026. In March 2025, WWE uploaded the entire event to stream freely on their WWE Vault YouTube channel.

As of October 2026, subscribers in multiple territories, including the US, Canada and the UK, can stream the event on Netflix, thanks to the WWE's ten-year agreement with the company.

== Results ==
No.	Results	Stipulations	Times
1	The Can-Am Connection (Rick Martel and Tom Zenk) defeated Bob Orton and The Magnificent Muraco (with Mr. Fuji) by pinfall	Tag team match	5:37
2	Billy Jack Haynes vs. Hercules (with Bobby Heenan) ended in a double countout	Singles match	7:44
3	Hillbilly Jim, Haiti Kid, and Little Beaver defeated King Kong Bundy, Little Tokyo, and Lord Littlebrook by disqualification	Six-man tag team match	3:25
4	Harley Race (with Bobby Heenan and The Fabulous Moolah) defeated Junkyard Dog by pinfall	Loser Must Bow match	4:22
5	The Dream Team (Greg Valentine and Brutus Beefcake) (with Johnny Valiant and Dino Bravo) defeated The Rougeau Brothers (Jacques Rougeau and Raymond Rougeau) by pinfall	Tag team match	4:03
6	Roddy Piper defeated Adrian Adonis (with Jimmy Hart) by submission	Hair vs. Hair match	6:33
7	Danny Davis and The Hart Foundation (Bret Hart and Jim Neidhart) (with Jimmy Hart) defeated Tito Santana and The British Bulldogs (Davey Boy Smith and Dynamite Kid) by pinfall	Six-man tag team match	8:52
8	Butch Reed (with Slick) defeated Koko B. Ware by pinfall	Singles match	3:39
9	Ricky Steamboat (with George Steele) defeated Randy Savage (c) (with Miss Elizabeth) by pinfall	Singles match for the WWF Intercontinental Championship	14:35
10	The Honky Tonk Man (with Jimmy Hart) defeated Jake Roberts (with Alice Cooper) by pinfall	Singles match	7:04
11	The Iron Sheik and Nikolai Volkoff (with Slick) defeated The Killer Bees (B. Brian Blair and Jim Brunzell) by disqualification	Tag team match	5:44
12	Hulk Hogan (c) defeated André the Giant (with Bobby Heenan) by pinfall	Singles match for the WWF World Heavyweight Championship	12:01
(c) / – the champion(s) heading into the match
