= Hillbilly Jim =

American professional wrestler (born 1952)

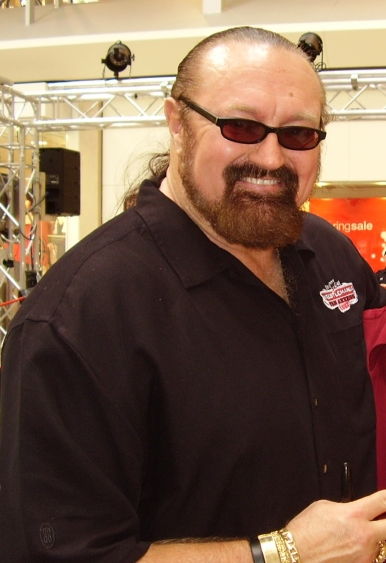
- Jim in 2007

Personal information
- Born: James Morris; July 5, 1952 (age 74) Scottsville, Kentucky, U.S.

Professional wrestling career
- Ring name(s): Big Jim; Harley Davidson; Hillbilly Jim
- Billed height: 6 ft 7 in (2.01 m)
- Billed weight: 320 lb (145 kg)
- Billed from: Mud Lick, Kentucky
- Trained by: Dale Mann
- Debut: 1975
- Retired: 1991

James Morris (born July 5, 1952) is an American retired professional wrestler and current radio host, better known by his ring name, Hillbilly Jim. He is best known for his appearances with the World Wrestling Federation (WWF) from 1984 to 1991.

== Professional wrestling career ==
=== Early career (1975–1984) ===
Morris became interested in wrestling after watching Georgia Championship Wrestling on television. He was brought into the business when he met Bruce Swayze at a Bowling Green High School gym, where Morris had been an All-State basketball player. He began his career with Stu Hart's Stampede Wrestling and other promotions in North America under his real name. He then went to work for the Continental Wrestling Association (CWA) in the Memphis area under the name "Harley Davidson", a biker gimmick.

=== World Wrestling Federation (1984–1991) ===
In late 1984, Morris first appeared in the WWF as a wrestling fan known as "Big Jim" who routinely sat in the front row of live events and eventually decided to try his hand at wrestling himself. After appearing as a guest on Piper's Pit, Rowdy Roddy Piper offered his services to train him, but he chose to be "trained"' by WWF Heavyweight Champion Hulk Hogan instead of the heel Piper.

A series of vignettes were aired on WWF's TV programming in the early weeks of 1985, showing Hogan training Jim and providing him with his first set of wrestling boots. This introduced the character of Hillbilly Jim; a simple-minded, shaggy-bearded Appalachian hillbilly clad in bib overalls, and hailing from Mud Lick, Kentucky. Hillbilly Jim had his first high-profile singles match at The War to Settle the Score on February 18, 1985, in which he defeated Rene Goulet.

Just days later, Morris was sidelined by an injury he suffered at a show in San Diego while in Hogan's corner in a match between him and Brutus Beefcake. While chasing Beefcake's manager Johnny V around ringside, Morris slipped on a wet spot and injured his knee. To help fill in the six months during his recovery, similarly dressed "family" members Uncle Elmer, Cousin Luke, and Cousin Junior were introduced for Morris to accompany to ringside as a manager.

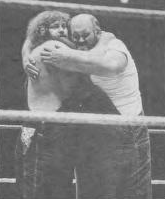
Morris (left) and Uncle Elmer embracing, April 1986

When his in-ring career resumed, Morris often either teamed with his family or André the Giant. He was traditionally matched up against the WWF's monster heels of the era, such as Big John Studd and King Kong Bundy. He also had a short feud with Don Muraco and Mr. Fuji, wrestling the latter in a series of tuxedo matches in late 1986. Hillbilly Jim was generally kept as a "fun" character, rarely getting involved in any serious storylines. His theme music was a folksy barn dance tune called "Don't Go Messin' With a Country Boy", which Morris danced along to with his partners, the ring announcer and/or children from the crowd.

His first WrestleMania appearance was at WrestleMania 2 on April 7, 1986, as part of a battle royal. At WrestleMania III on March 29, 1987, Jim teamed with Haiti Kid and Little Beaver to defeat Bundy, Little Tokyo and Lord Littlebrook. On November 24, 1988, at Survivor Series, Jim, Hogan, Randy Savage, Hercules and Koko B. Ware defeated the team of Big Boss Man, Akeem, Ted DiBiase, King Haku and The Red Rooster.

In June 1989, Jim worked as a fill-in for John Studd, who departed the WWF in the midst of a major feud with André the Giant. Hillbilly Jim's last high-profile match with the WWF was during the April 28, 1990 (taped April 23) edition of Saturday Night's Main Event XXVI, in which he lost to Earthquake. Months later, Jim retired from wrestling and stuck to co-hosting WWF All-American Wrestling with Gene Okerlund, although he came back to wrestling in the spring of 1991 to face Colonel Mustafa and The Berzerker at house shows.

=== Later career (1991–present) ===
In 1992, he was one of the co-hosts of WWF Prime Time Wrestling. Hillbilly Jim returned in 1996 and became the manager of Henry O. and Phineas I. Godwinn, "cousins" (later brothers) who were pig farmers. He left managing after the Godwinns turned heel in the spring of 1997 and worked as a road agent. On April 1, 2001, he participated in the "Gimmick Battle Royal" at WrestleMania X-Seven, where he was the last man eliminated by The Iron Sheik.

He was the official WWE legend host of the highly successful WrestleMania Axxess tour for WrestleMania XX, WrestleMania 21, WrestleMania 22, and WrestleMania 23 in major malls across the US. From 1990 to 2001, Morris traveled worldwide representing the WWF for Coliseum Video sales and later with Sony Videos. In 2005, Sirius Satellite Radio added Hillbilly Jim's Moonshine Matinee as a weekly program on its Outlaw Country channel 62. Every Saturday, Morris plays a wide variety of classic country music and Southern rock and tells stories of his days with the WWF.

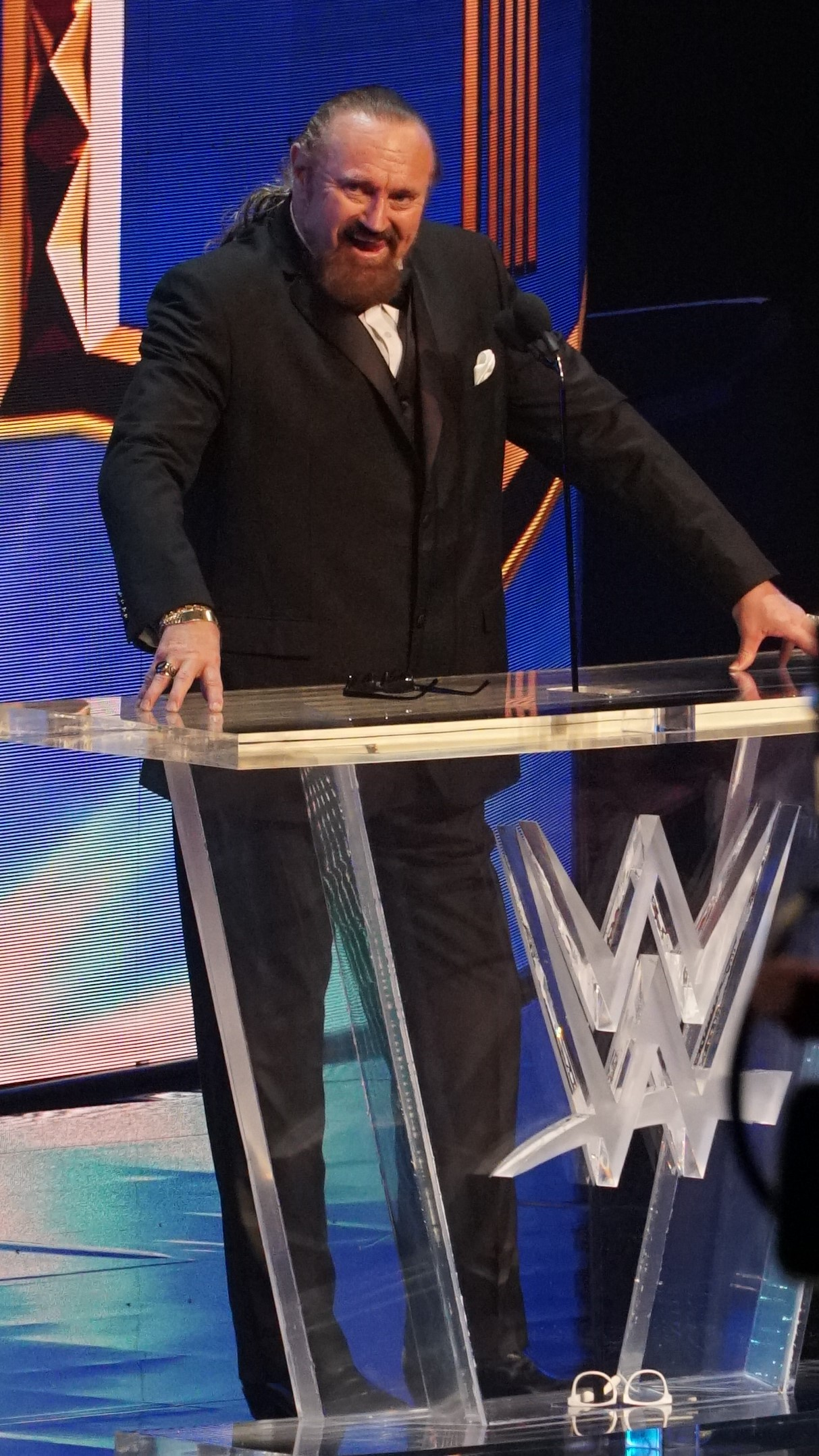
Hillbilly Jim being inducted into the WWE Hall of Fame in 2018

He made an appearance on the "Blast from the Past" episode of WWE SmackDown on April 10, 2012. In March 2018, Hillbilly Jim was inducted into the WWE Hall of Fame by Jimmy Hart.

== Personal life ==
Morris has four children and seven grandchildren. After retiring from wrestling, he began working for a coin, currency, and stamp dealership called Champion Stamp Company Inc. He is known as a "staple" at coin and currency shows, but is largely there as a spokesman rather than for his expertise in numismatics, although he does collect some paper money and coins himself.

== Other media ==
- He appeared in WWE cartoon series Hulk Hogan's Rock 'n' Wrestling, which was produced by DIC Enterprises.
- He is featured in the game WWE SmackDown! Here Comes the Pain.
- He performed the song "Don't Go Messing With A Country Boy" for The Wrestling Album, which was certified gold. Its follow-up album, Piledriver - The Wrestling Album 2, included a duet by Hillbilly Jim and a female singer credited as Gertrude, entitled "Waking Up Alone".
- He appeared in WWE Legends' House, which aired on the WWE Network in 2014.
- In October 2016, Morris released his book, Hillbilly Jim: The Incredible Story of a Wrestling Superstar.

== Championships and accomplishments ==
- Pro Wrestling Illustrated

- PWI ranked him No. 298 of the 500 best singles wrestlers during the "PWI Years" in 2003.

- WWE

- WWE Hall of Fame (Class of 2018)
