= Huggy Bear (disambiguation) =

Huggy Bear is a character played by Antonio Fargas on the 1970s TV show Starsky & Hutch, and by Snoop Dogg in the 2004 film.

The term can also refer to:

- Bob Huggins, retired college basketball coach
- Huggy Bear (band), early 1990s riot grrrl band
- Quinn Hughes, NHL defenceman
