= Lord Littlebrook =

English professional wrestler

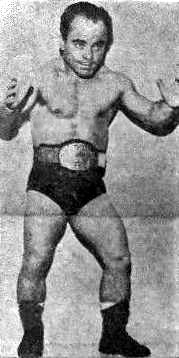
- Littlebrook in 1975

Personal information
- Born: Eric Henry Edward Tovey; 3 January 1929 Tottenham, London, England
- Died: 9 September 2016 (aged 87) St. Joseph, Missouri, U.S.

Professional wrestling career
- Ring name(s): Lord Littlebrook; Roger Littlebrook
- Billed height: 4 ft 4 in (1.32 m)
- Billed weight: 108 lb (49 kg)
- Debut: 1949–1950
- Retired: 1997

Eric Henry Edward Tovey (3 January 1929 – 9 September 2016), known professionally as Lord Littlebrook, was an English midget wrestler. He enjoyed his greatest success during the 1970s, when he held the NWA World Midget's Championship. He was also part of the Wrestlemania III card in 1987 in front of nearly 78,000 fans at the Pontiac Silverdome in Detroit, then the largest professional wrestling attendance in North American history.

== Career ==
Tovey was born in England on 3 January 1929 and grew up with six siblings. He began performing in front of audiences in the circus at the age of 14 serving as an acrobatic midget clown. Tovey traveled to the United States with the circus in 1949 but lost his job when the circus went out of business. He was then convinced by a friend that he would be an ideal midget wrestler. After three months of training, Tovey made his debut as "Lord Littlebrook" against Major Tom Thumb. Although from a working-class background, Tovey took a nobility gimmick in line with the general American stereotype of the British.

He is credited as being one of the first wrestlers to use aerial assaults on his opponents, paving the way for high wire acts such as Jimmy Snuka, The Rockers, and Koko B. Ware.

As Littlebrook, Tovey enjoyed great success in places such as Australia, Japan and Thailand. From 1956 to 1958, he wrestled in New York state. He faced other midget wrestlers, including several who he would later wrestle in the World Wrestling Federation. He won most of his matches, although he was booked to lose several tag team matches. In the late 1960s, he competed regularly for Georgia Championship Wrestling. Again, he wrestled in matches against other midget wrestlers and was victorious in the majority of his matches.

In 1979, Littlebrook began wrestling with the American Wrestling Association (AWA), and was brought in to team with The Crusher in a feud with Lord Alfred Hayes and Super Destroyer Mark II. In 1986, he competed in a tag team match at the AWA's WrestleRock event, teaming with Little Tokyo. The pair lost to Little Mr. T and Cowboy Lang. He also competed in WrestleMania III in a mixed tag-team match with Little Tokyo and King Kong Bundy against Hillbilly Jim, Little Beaver and Haiti Kid. Littlebrook's team was disqualified when Bundy bodyslammed and dropped an elbow on Little Beaver.

Tovey was involved in the wrestling business for 47 years as a wrestler, manager and a trainer. He trained Colonel DeBeers, as well and Mike George. In the late 1980s, Tovey, as Lord Littlebrook, was brought in to World Championship Wrestling to manage Jack Victory and Rip Morgan, who teamed as The Royal Family. Tovey has also been enshrined into the Canadian Professional Wrestling Hall of Fame and the Professional Wrestling Hall of Fame.

== Personal life ==
Tovey lived in Saint Joseph, Missouri, with his son Bobby. His other son, Chris, and Bobby compete as Kato and Beautiful Bobby with the midget wrestling group the Half Pint Brawlers. Tovey had 28 grandchildren. After retiring from wrestling, Tovey was diagnosed with dementia and lost the use of both of his legs. He also had surgery for skin cancer on his arm and recovered. Tovey died on 9 September 2016 at the age of 87 after suffering from a variety of health issues.

== Championships and accomplishments ==
- All-Star Wrestling Alliance
  - ASWA Midget Championship (1 time)
- National Wrestling Alliance
  - NWA World Midget's Championship (1 time)
- Professional wrestling
  - Midgets' World Championship (3 times)
- Professional Wrestling Hall of Fame
  - Midget Wrestler (2004)
- Pro Wrestling Illustrated
  - PWI Midget Wrestler of the Year (1976)
