= Little Beaver (wrestler) =

Canadian professional wrestler

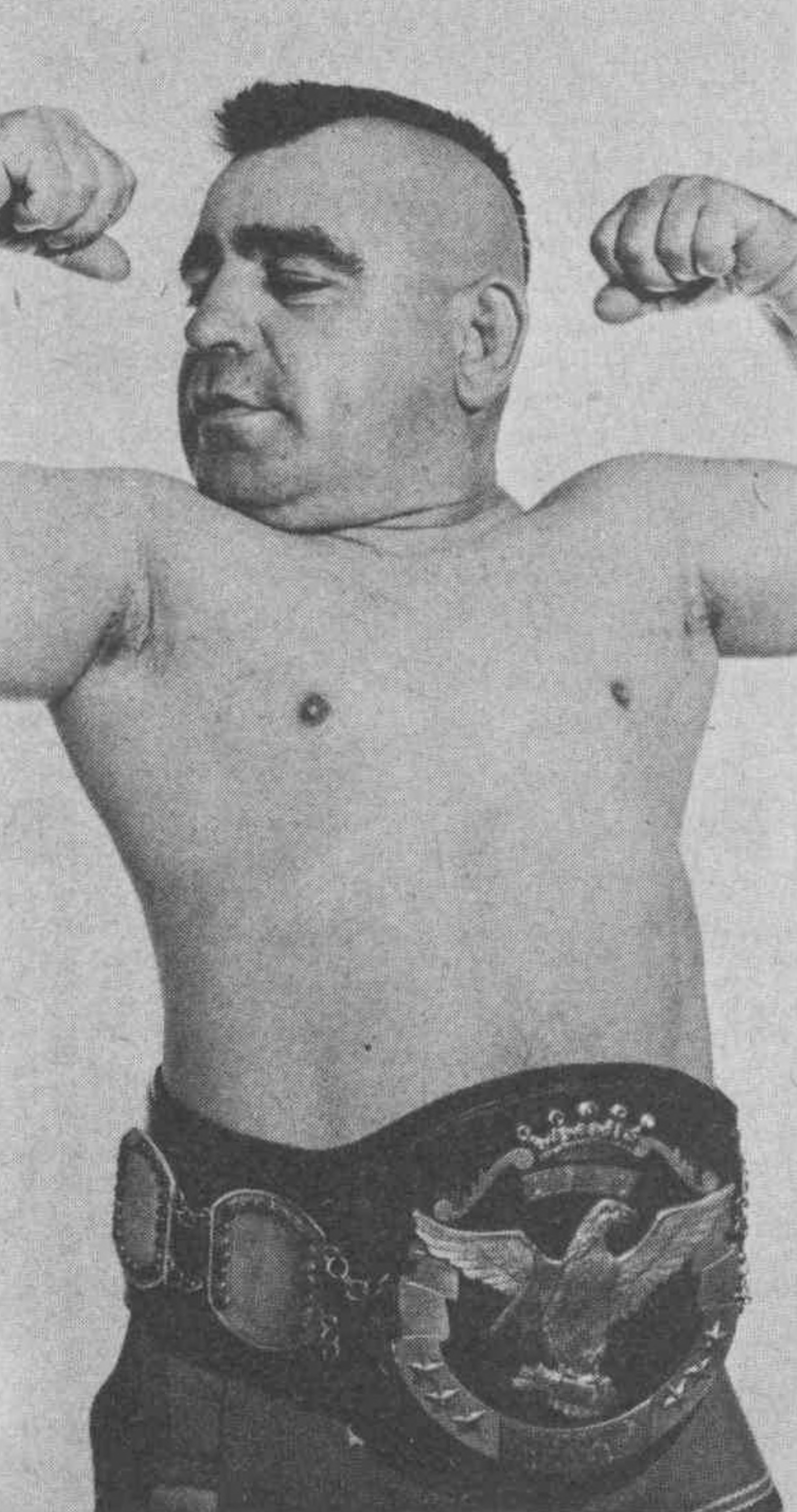
- Little Beaver, circa 1973

Personal information
- Born: Lionel Giroux; January 14, 1934 Saint-Jérôme, Quebec, Canada
- Died: December 4, 1995 (aged 61)

Professional wrestling career
- Ring name: Little Beaver
- Billed height: 4 ft 4 in (132 cm)
- Billed weight: 60 lb (27 kg)
- Debut: 1949
- Retired: March 29, 1987

Lionel Giroux (January 14, 1934 – December 4, 1995) was a Canadian professional wrestler, better known by the ring name Little Beaver. He is best known for his appearance in a six-man tag team match at WrestleMania III in 1987.

== Professional wrestling career ==
Lionel Giroux began his wrestling career in 1949, at the age of fifteen, and then began to wrestle for promoters in Quebec. He, along with Sky Low Low, became two of the most famous midget wrestlers in wrestling who had enough drawing power to command a large portion of the live gate for wrestling events. Giroux helped to create the comedy matches that have since become a trademark for midget wrestling in Canada and the United States. In 1973, Giroux won the Pro Wrestling Illustrated Midget Wrestler of the Year award.

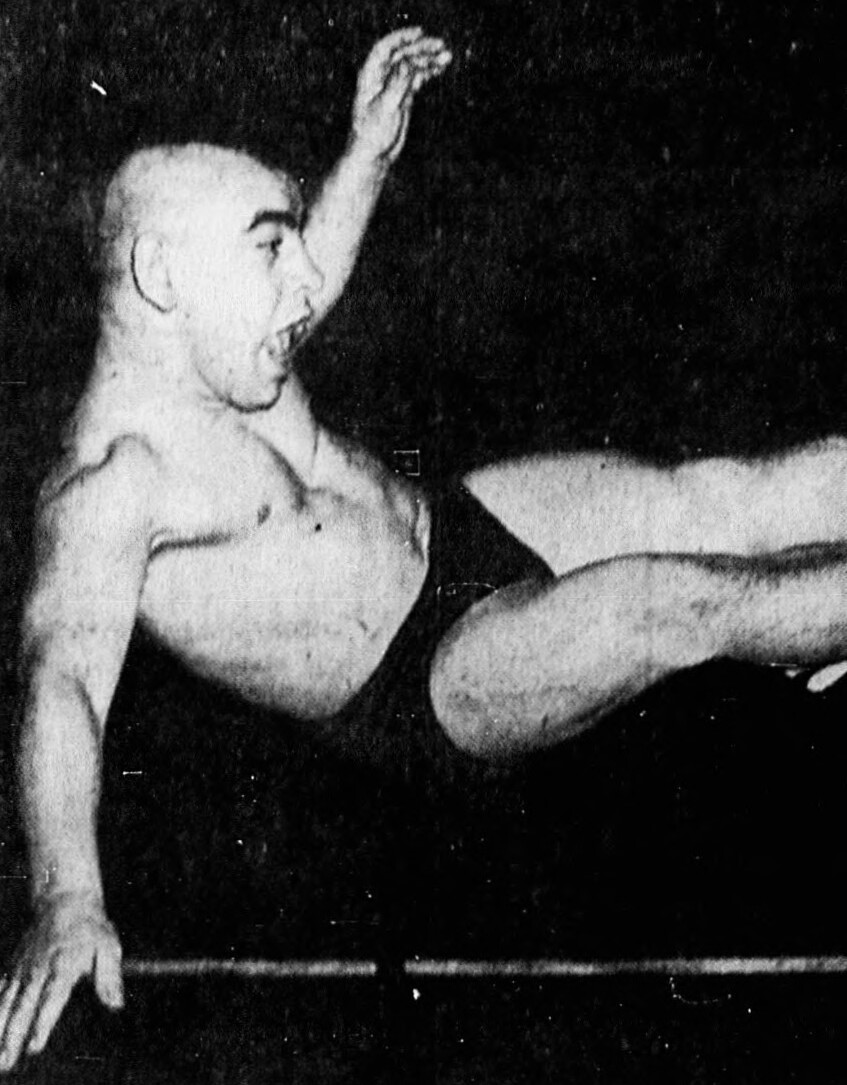
Little Beaver in 1952

His last in-ring appearance was at WrestleMania III in the Pontiac Silverdome in Pontiac, Michigan, in 1987, at the age of 53. Giroux, wrestling as Little Beaver, teamed with Hillbilly Jim and fellow midget wrestler the Haiti Kid, defeating King Kong Bundy and his midget tag-team partners Little Tokyo and Lord Littlebrook, after Bundy was disqualified for attacking Little Beaver. During the match, Giroux suffered a back injury at the hands of Bundy after he was bodyslammed and had an elbow dropped on him by the 458 lb (208 kg) Bundy, which forced him to retire from professional wrestling. In a 1998 interview Bundy said he hoped that he wasn't responsible for Giroux's early death, saying he wouldn't want that on his conscience.

== Death ==
Giroux died on December 4, 1995, of emphysema. In 2003, Giroux was inducted into the Professional Wrestling Hall of Fame.

== Championships and accomplishments ==
- National Wrestling Alliance
  - NWA World Midget's Championship (2 times)
  - NWA Hall of Fame (Class of 2012)
- Stampede Wrestling
  - Stampede Wrestling Hall of Fame (Class of 1995)
- Pro Wrestling Illustrated
  - Midget Wrestler of the Year (1973)
- Professional Wrestling Hall of Fame
  - Professional Wrestling Hall of Fame Inductee (2003)
- Other
  - Midgets' World Championship (3 times)
  - Midgets' World Tag Team Championship (1 time) – with Jim Corbett
