= Sky Low Low =

Canadian professional wrestler

Personal information
- Born: Marcel Gauthier; July 21, 1928 Montreal, Quebec, Canada
- Died: November 6, 1998 (aged 70)

Professional wrestling career
- Ring name: Sky Low Low
- Billed height: 3 ft 6 in (107 cm)
- Billed weight: 86 lb (39 kg)
- Billed from: Montreal, Quebec, Canada
- Debut: 1949
- Retired: 1988

Marcel Gauthier (July 21, 1928 – November 6, 1998) was a Canadian professional midget wrestler who wrestled under the ring name Sky Low Low (a reference to Sky Hi Lee).

== Professional wrestling career ==
Known by his midget wrestler persona "Sky Low Low", Gauthier stood just 42 inches tall and weighed 86 pounds. He began wrestling in the 1940s. He made his debut in the Canadian National Wrestling Alliance and soon claimed the NWA World Midget Championship in Paris, France. He was managed for the bulk of his career by Jack Britton, father of Gino Brito. Gauthier and Little Beaver squared off in a match for Elizabeth II of the United Kingdom and King Farouk of Egypt.

Touring with the World Wrestling Federation as late as the 1980s, one of his gimmicks was an open challenge to any other midget professional wrestlers to beat him in a two out of three falls match for $100. He could also stand on his head without using his hands to balance himself. He had a longtime feud with Farmer Brooks.

== Personal life ==
During World War II, he worked in the tail of an aircraft bomber, fixing rivets. He liked fishing, golfing, and horseback riding. He died on November 6, 1998, from a heart attack. He was married at the time of his death. He was posthumously inducted into the Professional Wrestling Hall of Fame in 2002.

== Championships and accomplishments ==
- Professional Wrestling Hall of Fame and Museum
  - Class of 2002
- National Wrestling Alliance
  - NWA World Midget's Championship (1 time, inaugural)
- Pro Wrestling Illustrated
  - PWI Midget Wrestler of the Year (1975)
- Stampede Wrestling
  - Stampede Wrestling Hall of Fame (Class of 1995)
- Other titles
  - Midgets' World Championship (2 times)
