= Saturday Night's Main Event =

WWE television programs

- WWE Saturday Night's Main Event logo used since 2024
- Genre: Professional wrestling
- Created by: Vince McMahon
- Starring: Raw roster SmackDown roster
- Opening theme: "Obsession" by Animotion (May 11, 1985–January 2, 1988; December 14, 2024–present); "Saturday Night's Main Event" by Douglas Grama (March 12, 1988–April 27, 1991; December 14, 2024–present); "New Trip" by Quavo, Yeat, and Bnyx (December 13, 2025–present); "Boom" by P.O.D. (March 18, 2006–August 2, 2008)
- Ending theme: "Take Me Home" by Phil Collins (1985–1988)
- Country of origin: United States
- Original language: English
- No. of episodes: 46

Production
- Executive producers: Dick Ebersol; Paul Levesque; Lee Fitting; Kevin Dunn
- Producer: Paul Levesque
- Running time: 90 minutes (1985–1991, 2007); 60 minutes (1992, 2008); 120 minutes (2006, 2024–2025) varies (2025–present)
- Production companies: Once a Month Productions, Inc. (1985–1991); WWF / WWE (1985–1992, 2006–2008, 2024–present)

Original release
- Network: NBC
- Release: May 11, 1985 – April 27, 1991
- Network: Fox
- Release: February 8 – November 14, 1992
- Network: NBC
- Release: March 18, 2006 – August 2, 2008
- Network: NBC
- Release: December 14, 2024 – July 12, 2025
- Network: Peacock
- Release: December 14, 2024 – present

Related
- WWE Raw; WWE NXT; WWE SmackDown; The Main Event

Saturday Night's Main Event is a series of American professional wrestling television specials produced by WWE (previously the World Wrestling Federation or WWF). The series originally broadcast from 1985 to 1992, by NBC until 1991 then briefly by Fox. The specials were briefly revived on NBC from 2006 to 2008, and then again from 2024 to 2025; the current iteration features performers from WWE's Raw and SmackDown brands.

The first iteration of the show replaced Saturday Night Live in its late night timeslot on an occasional basis throughout the year. At this time when weekly wrestling programs typically consisted primarily of squash matches featuring established stars dominating enhancement talent, Saturday Night's Main Event consisted almost entirely of star vs. star matches rarely seen on television, including title defenses and specialty matches. It coincided with and contributed to the apogee of the "second golden age" of professional wrestling in the United States; bolstered by regular in-ring appearances by WWF stars such as Hulk Hogan, Saturday Night's Main Event drew large audiences for much of its run, while a spin-off simply titled The Main Event aired annually on a Friday night in February beginning in 1988. After a fall in ratings, NBC dropped the specials and it was picked up by Fox, which aired two editions of the special on the network until canceling it in 1992.

In 2006, Saturday Night's Main Event was briefly revived as a series of prime time specials on NBC, as part of WWE's agreement with NBC Universal to air its weekly program Raw on USA Network. Five episodes aired as part of the revived run before it was discontinued in 2008. In April 2022, WWE repurposed the Saturday Night's Main Event title for house shows held on Saturday nights. In 2024, as part of an agreement moving WWE SmackDown from Fox to USA, WWE announced that it would revive Saturday Night's Main Event, airing on NBC and streaming on Peacock in the United States and on YouTube internationally. In August 2025, WWE announced that going forward, Saturday Night's Main Event would air exclusively on Peacock in the US.

== History ==
=== Original run (1985–1992) ===
The first NBC era logo, May 11, 1985–April 27, 1991

Saturday Night's Main Event debuted on May 11, 1985, in the late-night time slot normally assigned to reruns of the NBC sketch comedy Saturday Night Live. Then-SNL executive producer Dick Ebersol had made a deal with WWF owner Vince McMahon to produce the show, after Ebersol had seen the high ratings that two WWF specials drew on MTV in 1984–85: The Brawl to End It All and The War to Settle the Score. Although the show aired infrequently, it did, starting in 1986, settle into a predictable pattern of airdates: New Year's weekend, an episode in late February/early March, an episode in late April/early May, an episode in late September/early October, and Thanksgiving weekend. 1989 and 1990 both offered episodes in July promoted as "Summertime Bonus Editions", some of the Superstars would come on The Arsenio Hall Show interviewed by Arsenio Hall himself to build up/hype of the event.

Saturday Night's Main Event was a rating success for NBC during its heyday, most notably on the March 14, 1987, show, which drew an 11.6 rating, which to this day remains the highest rating any show has ever done in that time slot. That show was headlined by a battle royal involving Hulk Hogan and André the Giant, who were slated to face each other at WrestleMania III. As Hogan rarely wrestled on the WWF syndicated and cable television shows, Saturday Night's Main Event was the program on free television where most viewers were able to see him in action. The success of Saturday Night's Main Event led to several Friday night prime time specials, known as The Main Event. The first of these, on February 5, 1988, included a WrestleMania III rematch between Hogan and André and drew 33 million viewers and a 15.2 rating, which is still the highest-rated television show in American professional wrestling history. While ratings remained strong through 1990, they began to fall shortly thereafter. NBC, who had just acquired the rights to broadcast NBA games nationwide, now started to lose interest in wrestling, and Saturday Night's Main Event was dropped. Its final NBC airing occurred on April 27, 1991. Fox picked up the show in 1992, but it was only shown twice on Fox; on February 8, 1992, and the final Saturday Night's Main Event of the original run was broadcast on November 14, 1992.

The logo used for broadcasts on Fox in 1992

For much of its history, Saturday Night's Main Event was hosted by McMahon and Jesse "The Body" Ventura with the occasional use of Bobby Heenan in 1986 and 1987. In 1990, Roddy Piper replaced Ventura as McMahon's broadcast partner when Ventura left the WWF. On the two episodes that aired on Fox, Heenan served as McMahon's partner. From 1985 to 1988, the opening theme song for the NBC version was "Obsession" by Animotion with the closing theme being "Take Me Home" by Phil Collins, and also the beginning of "Take On Me" by a-ha was used for show bumpers. Steve Winwood's "Higher Love" was also used as a closing theme. Starting on the October 4, 1986 edition, each show featured a cold open of short wrestler promos set to a loop of the beginning of Lee Ritenour's "Traveling Music" from the American Flyers soundtrack. In February 1988, the songs were replaced with an original WWF-created instrumental theme. The new instrumental theme was originally used as the theme of the 1987 WWF Slammy Awards. A different opening theme song was used for the February 1992 episode.

Selected episodes were also shown in the United Kingdom on ITV in its weekly Saturday lunchtime World of Sport slot, mainly thanks to the popularity of The British Bulldogs.

=== First revived run (2006–2008) ===
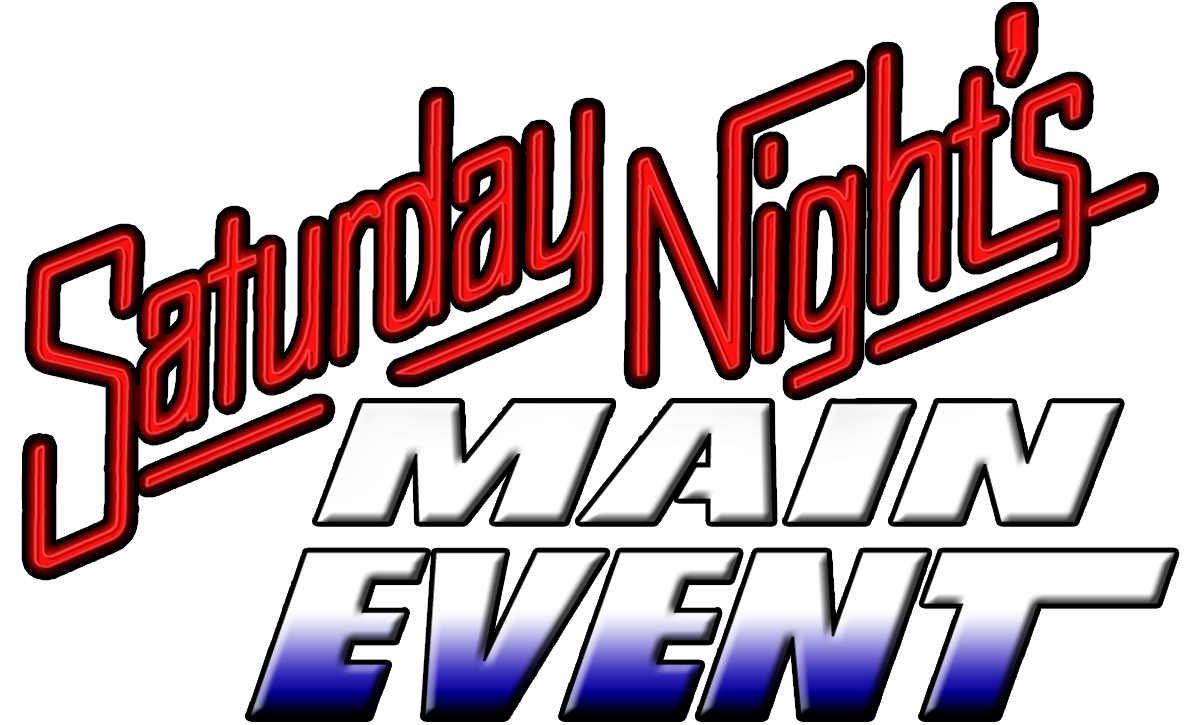
The second NBC era logo, March 18, 2006–August 2, 2008

When WWE's flagship show, Raw, returned to the USA Network in 2005, Saturday Night's Main Event was revived in 2006 as a "special series" to air on occasion on NBC as part of a deal between WWE and NBC Universal. The Raw, SmackDown, and ECW brand rosters appeared on the show.

Saturday Night's Main Event returned to NBC on March 18, 2006, in a prime-time slot. The first episode aired on a 1-hour time delay, the second episode aired live, with the three remaining episodes airing at a later date.

The series was discontinued after July 2008; in lieu of Saturday Night's Main Event, WWE began to instead produce hour-long WrestleMania highlights specials for NBC, beginning with The 25th Anniversary of WrestleMania: The World Television Premiere in 2009.

=== Second revived run (2024–present) ===
In 2024, after having moved from USA Network to Fox in 2019, WWE SmackDown returned to USA Network as part of a five-year agreement with NBCUniversal. As part of the agreement, it was stated that WWE would produce four prime time specials for NBC per-year for the length of the agreement. On September 17, 2024, WWE announced that it would be producing a second revival of Saturday Night's Main Event, with the first episode airing on December 14 from Nassau Coliseum—the site of the first edition of the series.

The new revival features homages to the original run of Saturday Night's Main Event and WWE in the 1980s, including a lack of TitanTron, red, white, and blue ring ropes, referees in formal outfits, some branding elements using the WWE "throwback" logo, (Note: The "throwback" logo refers to the Golden Era logo used from 1982 to 1994, albeit without the "F" on it. This change was the result of WWE (then majority owned by Vince McMahon) and the World Wildlife Fund for Nature reached a settlement in 2012 to allow the company to use the pre-2002 WWF logos in older, archived footage but prohibited to use the vintage WWF logos in newer footage and promotional materials.) and the reinstatement of "Obsession" by Animotion as its theme music (albeit this time not as an instrumental). Cody Rhodes also wore the "Winged Eagle" belt (first introduced in 1988 for the then-WWF World Heavyweight Championship) to represent his Undisputed WWE Championship.

In August 2025, it was announced that Saturday Night's Main Event would move to NBC's sister streaming service Peacock in the United States, following the service's loss of main roster live events to ESPN. The December edition would feature John Cena's retirement match.

== Events ==
The following table lists the dates and locations of televised events; they do not include the 2022 house shows.

| Event | Date | | City | Venue | Main Event | Ref |
| Event | Taping | Aired | City | Venue | Main Event | Ref |
|---|---|---|---|---|---|---|
| Saturday Night's Main Event I | May 10, 1985 | May 11, 1985 | Uniondale, New York | Nassau Veterans Memorial Coliseum | Hulk Hogan (c) vs. Bob Orton for the WWF World Heavyweight Championship | |
| Saturday Night's Main Event II | October 3, 1985 | October 5, 1985 | East Rutherford, New Jersey | Brendan Byrne Arena | Hulk Hogan (c) vs. Nikolai Volkoff in a Flag match for the WWF World Heavyweight Championship | |
| Saturday Night's Main Event III | October 31, 1985 | November 2, 1985 | Hershey, Pennsylvania | Hersheypark Arena | Hulk Hogan and Andre the Giant vs. King Kong Bundy and Big John Studd | |
| Saturday Night's Main Event IV | December 19, 1985 | January 4, 1986 | Tampa, Florida | USF Sun Dome | Hulk Hogan (c) vs. Terry Funk for the WWF World Heavyweight Championship | |
| Saturday Night's Main Event V | February 15, 1986 | March 1, 1986 | Phoenix, Arizona | Arizona Veterans Memorial Coliseum | Hulk Hogan (c) vs. The Magnificent Muraco for the WWF World Heavyweight Championship | |
| Saturday Night's Main Event VI | May 1, 1986 | May 3, 1986 | Providence, Rhode Island | Providence Civic Center | Hulk Hogan and Junkyard Dog vs. Terry Funk and Hoss Funk | |
| Saturday Night's Main Event VII | September 13, 1986 | October 4, 1986 | Richfield, Ohio | Coliseum at Richfield | Hulk Hogan (c) vs. Paul Orndorff for the WWF World Heavyweight Championship | |
| Saturday Night's Main Event VIII | November 15, 1986 | November 29, 1986 | Los Angeles, California | Los Angeles Memorial Sports Arena | Hulk Hogan (c) vs. Hercules Hernandez for the WWF World Heavyweight Championship | |
| Saturday Night's Main Event IX | December 14, 1986 | January 3, 1987 | Hartford, Connecticut | Hartford Civic Center | Hulk Hogan (c) vs. Paul Orndorff in a Steel cage match for the WWF World Heavyweight Championship | |
| Saturday Night's Main Event X | February 21, 1987 | March 14, 1987 | Detroit, Michigan | Joe Louis Arena | 20-Man Battle Royal | |
| Saturday Night's Main Event XI | April 28, 1987 | May 2, 1987 | Notre Dame, Indiana | Edmund P. Joyce Center | George Steele vs. Randy Savage in a Lumberjack match | |
| Saturday Night's Main Event XII | September 23, 1987 | October 3, 1987 | Hershey, Pennsylvania | Hersheypark Arena | Hulk Hogan (c) vs. Sika for the WWF World Heavyweight Championship | |
| Saturday Night's Main Event XIII | November 11, 1987 | November 28, 1987 | Seattle, Washington | Seattle Center Coliseum | Hulk Hogan (c) vs. King Kong Bundy for the WWF World Heavyweight Championship | |
| Saturday Night's Main Event XIV | December 7, 1987 | January 2, 1988 | Landover, Maryland | Capital Centre | Hulk Hogan (c) vs. King Kong Bundy for the WWF World Heavyweight Championship | |
| Saturday Night's Main Event XV | March 7, 1988 | March 12, 1988 | Nashville, Tennessee | Nashville Municipal Auditorium | Hulk Hogan vs. Harley Race | |
| Saturday Night's Main Event XVI | April 22, 1988 | April 30, 1988 | Springfield, Massachusetts | Springfield Civic Center | Randy Savage (c) vs. One Man Gang for the WWF World Heavyweight Championship | |
| Saturday Night's Main Event XVII | October 25, 1988 | October 29, 1988 | Baltimore, Maryland | Baltimore Arena | Hulk Hogan vs. King Haku | |
| Saturday Night's Main Event XVIII | November 16, 1988 | November 26, 1988 | Sacramento, California | ARCO Arena | Randy Savage (c) vs. Andre the Giant for the WWF World Heavyweight Championship | |
| Saturday Night's Main Event XIX | December 7, 1988 | January 7, 1989 | Tampa, Florida | USF Sun Dome | Hulk Hogan vs. Akeem | |
| Saturday Night's Main Event XX | February 16, 1989 | March 11, 1989 | Hershey, Pennsylvania | Hersheypark Arena | Hulk Hogan vs. Bad News Brown | |
| Saturday Night's Main Event XXI | April 25, 1989 | May 27, 1989 | Des Moines, Iowa | Veterans Memorial Auditorium | Hulk Hogan (c) vs. Big Boss Man in a Steel cage match for the WWF World Heavyweight Championship | |
| Saturday Night's Main Event XXII | July 18, 1989 | July 29, 1989 | Worcester, Massachusetts | Worcester Centrum | Hulk Hogan (c) vs. The Honky Tonk Man for the WWF Championship | |
| Saturday Night's Main Event XXIII | September 21, 1989 | October 14, 1989 | Cincinnati, Ohio | Riverfront Coliseum | Hulk Hogan (c) vs. Ted DiBiase for the WWF Championship | |
| Saturday Night's Main Event XXIV | October 31, 1989 | November 25, 1989 | Topeka, Kansas | Sunflower State Expocentre | Hulk Hogan (c) vs. The Genius for the WWF Championship | |
| Saturday Night's Main Event XXV | January 3, 1990 | January 27, 1990 | Chattanooga, Tennessee | UTC Arena | Hulk Hogan and Ultimate Warrior vs. Mr. Perfect and The Genius | |
| Saturday Night's Main Event XXVI | April 23, 1990 | April 28, 1990 | Austin, Texas | Frank Erwin Center | Ultimate Warrior (c) vs. Haku for the WWF Championship | |
| Saturday Night's Main Event XXVII | July 16, 1990 | July 28, 1990 | Omaha, Nebraska | Omaha Civic Auditorium | Ultimate Warrior (c) vs. Rick Rude for the WWF Championship | |
| Saturday Night's Main Event XXVIII | September 18, 1990 | October 13, 1990 | Toledo, Ohio | Toledo Sports Arena | Hulk Hogan and Tugboat vs. Rhythm and Blues (The Honky Tonk Man and Greg Valentine) | |
| Saturday Night's Main Event XXIX | April 15, 1991 | April 27, 1991 | Omaha, Nebraska | Omaha Civic Auditorium | 20-Man Battle Royal | |
| Saturday Night's Main Event XXX | January 27, 1992 | February 8, 1992 | Lubbock, Texas | Lubbock Municipal Coliseum | Hulk Hogan and Sid Justice vs. Ric Flair and The Undertaker | |
| Saturday Night's Main Event XXXI | October 27, 1992 | November 14, 1992 | Terre Haute, Indiana | Hulman Center | Bret Hart (c) vs. Papa Shango for the WWF Championship | |
| Saturday Night's Main Event XXXII | March 18, 2006 | | Detroit, Michigan | Cobo Arena | John Cena and Triple H vs. Kurt Angle, Rey Mysterio, and Randy Orton in a Handicap match | |
| Saturday Night's Main Event XXXIII | July 15, 2006 | | Dallas, Texas | American Airlines Center | Edge (c) vs. John Cena for the WWE Championship | |
| Saturday Night's Main Event XXXIV | May 28, 2007 | June 2, 2007 | Toronto, Ontario, Canada | Air Canada Centre | John Cena vs. The Great Khali | |
| Saturday Night's Main Event XXXV | August 13, 2007 | August 18, 2007 | New York City, New York | Madison Square Garden | John Cena vs. Carlito | |
| Saturday Night's Main Event XXXVI | July 28, 2008 | August 2, 2008 | Washington, D.C. | Verizon Center | Edge vs. Jeff Hardy | |
| Saturday Night's Main Event XXXVII | December 14, 2024 | | Uniondale, New York | Nassau Veterans Memorial Coliseum | Cody Rhodes (c) vs. Kevin Owens for the Undisputed WWE Championship | |
| Saturday Night's Main Event XXXVIII | January 25, 2025 | | San Antonio, Texas | Frost Bank Center | Gunther (c) vs. Jey Uso for the World Heavyweight Championship | |
| Saturday Night's Main Event XXXIX | May 24, 2025 | | Tampa, Florida | Yuengling Center | Jey Uso (c) vs. Logan Paul for the World Heavyweight Championship | |
| Saturday Night's Main Event XL | July 12, 2025 | | Atlanta, Georgia | State Farm Arena | Gunther (c) vs. Goldberg for the World Heavyweight Championship | |
| Saturday Night's Main Event XLI | November 1, 2025 | | Salt Lake City, Utah | Delta Center | CM Punk vs. Jey Uso for the vacant World Heavyweight Championship | |
| Saturday Night's Main Event XLII | December 13, 2025 | | Washington, D.C. | Capital One Arena | John Cena vs. Gunther | |
| Saturday Night's Main Event XLIII | January 24, 2026 | | Montreal, Quebec, Canada | Bell Centre | Randy Orton vs. Trick Williams vs. Damian Priest vs. Sami Zayn in a fatal four-way match to determine the #1 contender for the Undisputed WWE Championship at Royal Rumble | |
| Saturday Night's Main Event XLIV | May 23, 2026 | | Fort Wayne, Indiana | Allen County War Memorial Coliseum | The Vision (Logan Paul and Austin Theory) (c) vs. The Street Profits (Angelo Dawkins and Montez Ford) for the World Tag Team Championship | |
| Saturday Night's Main Event XLV | July 18, 2026 | | New York City, New York | Madison Square Garden | CM Punk and Cody Rhodes vs. Gunther and Sami Zayn | |
| Sunday Night's Main Event | September 6, 2026 | | Atlanta, Georgia | State Farm Arena | Cody Rhodes vs. Randy Orton | |
(c) – refers to the champion(s) heading into the match

== Results ==
The following lists the match results for Saturday Night's Main Event's televised shows, and do not include results for any of the 2022 house shows.

=== 1980s ===
==== Saturday Night's Main Event I ====
Saturday Night's Main Event I took place May 10, 1985, from Uniondale, New York, in Nassau Veterans Memorial Coliseum, and aired May 11, 1985, this was the first event for the Superstars that would be escorted to the ring by the host city's local police and since 1985, this has become a main staple for SNME. The event aired on NBC and drew an 8.8 rating.

==== Saturday Night's Main Event II ====
Saturday Night's Main Event II
- Promotion: World Wrestling Federation
- Date: October 3, 1985 (aired October 5, 1985)
- City: East Rutherford, New Jersey
- Venue: Brendan Byrne Arena
- Attendance: 8,000

Saturday Night's Main Event chronology
| ← Previous; I | Next → III |

Saturday Night's Main Event II took place on October 3, 1985, from East Rutherford, New Jersey, at the Brendan Byrne Arena, and aired on October 5, 1985. The event aired on NBC and drew an 8.3 rating.

During the broadcast, Uncle Elmer was legitimately married to Joyce Stazko.

| No. | Results | Stipulations | Times |
|---|---|---|---|
| 1 | Hulk Hogan (c) defeated Nikolai Volkoff (with Freddie Blassie) | Flag match for the WWF World Heavyweight Championship | 5:17 |
| 2 | Uncle Elmer (with Hillbilly Jim and Cousin Junior) defeated Jerry Valiant | Singles match | 0:12 |
| 3 | Paul Orndorff vs. Roddy Piper ended in a double countout | Singles match | 4:01 |
| 4 | André the Giant and Tony Atlas (with Lou Albano) defeated King Kong Bundy and Big John Studd (with Bobby Heenan) by disqualification | Tag team match | 4:26 |
| 5 | The Dream Team (Brutus Beefcake and Greg Valentine) (c) (with Johnny Valiant) defeated Lanny Poffo and Tony Garea | Tag team match for the WWF Tag Team Championship | 3:30 |
(c) / – the champion(s) heading into the match

==== Saturday Night's Main Event III ====
Saturday Night's Main Event III
- Promotion: World Wrestling Federation
- Date: October 31, 1985 (aired November 2, 1985)
- City: Hershey, Pennsylvania
- Venue: Hersheypark Arena
- Attendance: 8,000

Saturday Night's Main Event chronology
| ← Previous; II | Next → IV |

Saturday Night's Main Event III took place on October 31, 1985, from Hershey, Pennsylvania, at the Hersheypark Arena, and aired on November 2, 1985. The event aired on NBC and drew a 6.3 rating.

| No. | Results | Stipulations | Times |
|---|---|---|---|
| 1 | Terry Funk (with Jimmy Hart) defeated Junkyard Dog | Singles match | 5:16 |
| 2 | Hulk Hogan and André the Giant (with Lou Albano) defeated King Kong Bundy and Big John Studd (with Bobby Heenan) by disqualification | Tag team match | 8:00 |
| 3 | Randy Savage (with Miss Elizabeth) vs. Tito Santana (c) ended in a double countout | Singles match for the WWF Intercontinental Championship | 4:08 |
| 4 | Ricky Steamboat defeated Mr. Fuji (with The Magnificent Muraco) | Kung Fu Challenge | 3:16 |
(c) / – the champion(s) heading into the match

==== Saturday Night's Main Event IV ====
Saturday Night's Main Event IV
- Promotion: World Wrestling Federation
- Date: December 19, 1985 (aired January 4, 1986)
- City: Tampa, Florida
- Venue: USF Sun Dome

Saturday Night's Main Event chronology
| ← Previous; III | Next → V |

Saturday Night's Main Event IV took place on December 19, 1985, from Tampa, Florida, at the USF Sun Dome, and aired on January 4, 1986. The event aired on NBC and drew a 10.4 rating.

| No. | Results | Stipulations | Times |
|---|---|---|---|
| 1 | Jesse Ventura, Roddy Piper, and Bob Orton defeated Hillbilly Jim, Uncle Elmer, and Cousin Luke | Six-man tag team match | 8:00 |
| 2 | Hulk Hogan (c) (with Junkyard Dog) defeated Terry Funk (with Jimmy Hart) | Singles match for the WWF World Heavyweight Championship | 8:30 |
| 3 | Randy Savage (with Miss Elizabeth) defeated George Steele (with Lou Albano) | Singles match | 4:06 |
| 4 | Nikolai Volkoff (with Freddie Blassie and The Iron Sheik) defeated Corporal Kirchner | Peace Match | 4:32 |
| 5 | Junkyard Dog and Ricky Steamboat defeated Mr. Fuji and The Magnificent Muraco | Tag team match | 5:19 |
(c) / – the champion(s) heading into the match

==== Saturday Night's Main Event V ====
Saturday Night's Main Event V
- Promotion: World Wrestling Federation
- Date: February 15, 1986 (aired March 1, 1986)
- City: Phoenix, Arizona
- Venue: Arizona Veterans Memorial Coliseum
- Attendance: 12,000

Saturday Night's Main Event chronology
| ← Previous; IV | Next → VI |

Saturday Night's Main Event V took place on February 15, 1986, from Phoenix, Arizona, at the Arizona Veterans Memorial Coliseum, and aired on March 1, 1986. The event aired on NBC and drew a 10.0 rating.

Events during three of the matches – The Dream Team vs. The British Bulldogs for the WWF Tag Team Championship; Hulk Hogan vs. The Magnificent Muraco for the WWF World Heavyweight Championship; and Mr. T vs. "Battling" Bob Orton in a boxing match – helped set up three of the four major matches at WrestleMania 2.

The premiere airing of the video for "Real American," Hulk Hogan's entrance theme, took place.

| No. | Results | Stipulations | Times |
|---|---|---|---|
| 1 | Mr. T defeated Bob Orton (with Roddy Piper) | Boxing match | 5:02 |
| 2 | King Kong Bundy (with Bobby Heenan) defeated Steve Gatorwolf | Singles match | 0:41 |
| 3 | Hulk Hogan (c) defeated The Magnificent Muraco (with Bobby Heenan) by disqualification | Singles match for the WWF World Heavyweight Championship | 6:53 |
| 4 | The Dream Team (Brutus Beefcake and Greg Valentine) (c) (with Johnny Valiant) defeated The British Bulldogs (Davey Boy Smith and Dynamite Kid) (with Lou Albano) | Tag team match for the WWF Tag Team Championship | 12:00 |
| 5 | Junkyard Dog defeated Adrian Adonis (with Jimmy Hart) | Singles match | 8:45 |
(c) / – the champion(s) heading into the match

==== Saturday Night's Main Event VI ====
Saturday Night's Main Event VI
- Promotion: World Wrestling Federation
- Date: May 1, 1986 (aired May 3, 1986)
- City: Providence, Rhode Island
- Venue: Providence Civic Center

Saturday Night's Main Event chronology
| ← Previous; V | Next → VII |

Saturday Night's Main Event VI took place on May 1, 1986, from Providence, Rhode Island, at the Providence Civic Center, and aired on May 3, 1986. The show aired on NBC and drew a 9.3 rating.

Jake Roberts sneak-attacked Ricky Steamboat and took him out with his finisher, the DDT, on the arena's concrete floor prior to the match starting, helping set up a feud that continued through the summer and early fall of 1986.

| No. | Results | Stipulations | Times |
|---|---|---|---|
| 1 | Hulk Hogan and Junkyard Dog (with The Haiti Kid) defeated Terry Funk and Hoss Funk (with Jimmy Hart) | Tag team match | 13:30 |
| 2 | King Kong Bundy defeated Uncle Elmer | Singles match | 2:35 |
| 3 | Adrian Adonis (with Jimmy Hart) defeated Paul Orndorff by disqualification | Singles match | 12:00 |
| 4 | The British Bulldogs (Davey Boy Smith and Dynamite Kid) (c) (with Lou Albano) defeated Nikolai Volkoff and The Iron Sheik (with Freddie Blassie) | Two-out-of-three-falls match for the WWF Tag Team Championship | 9:10 |
(c) / – the champion(s) heading into the match

==== Saturday Night's Main Event VII ====
Saturday Night's Main Event VII
- Promotion: World Wrestling Federation
- Date: September 13, 1986 (aired October 4, 1986)
- City: Richfield, Ohio
- Venue: Coliseum at Richfield
- Attendance: 21,000

Saturday Night's Main Event chronology
| ← Previous; VI | Next → VIII |

Saturday Night's Main Event VII took place on September 13, 1986, from Richfield, Ohio, at the Coliseum at Richfield, and aired on October 4, 1986. The event aired on NBC and drew a 9.4 rating.

This episode was the first to air following Roddy Piper's face turn.

| No. | Results | Stipulations | Times |
|---|---|---|---|
| 1 | Hulk Hogan (c) defeated Paul Orndorff (with Bobby Heenan) by disqualification | Singles match for the WWF World Heavyweight Championship | 10:00 |
| 2 | Ricky Steamboat defeated Jake Roberts | Singles match | 6:19 |
| 3 | Roddy Piper defeated The Iron Sheik (with Slick) | Singles match | 0:43 |
| 4 | The British Bulldogs (Davey Boy Smith and Dynamite Kid) (c) (with Lou Albano) defeated The Dream Team (Brutus Beefcake and Greg Valentine) (with Johnny Valiant) | Two-out-of-three-falls match for the WWF Tag Team Championship | 13:09 |
| 5 | Kamala (with The Wizard and Kim Chee) defeated Lanny Poffo | Singles match | 1:44 |
(c) / – the champion(s) heading into the match

==== Saturday Night's Main Event VIII ====
Saturday Night's Main Event VIII
- Promotion: World Wrestling Federation
- Date: November 15, 1986 (aired November 29, 1986)
- City: Los Angeles, California
- Venue: Los Angeles Memorial Sports Arena
- Attendance: 16,000

Saturday Night's Main Event chronology
| ← Previous; VII | Next → IX |

Saturday Night's Main Event VIII took place on November 15, 1986, from Los Angeles, California, at the Los Angeles Memorial Sports Arena, and aired on November 29, 1986. The event aired on NBC and drew a 9.7 rating.

| No. | Results | Stipulations | Times |
|---|---|---|---|
| 1 | Randy Savage (c) (with Miss Elizabeth) vs. Jake Roberts ended in a double disqualification | Singles match for the WWF Intercontinental Championship | 9:30 |
| 2 | Hulk Hogan (c) defeated Hercules Hernandez (with Bobby Heenan) | Singles match for the WWF World Heavyweight Championship | 6:30 |
| 3 | Roddy Piper defeated Bob Orton (with Jimmy Hart) | Singles match | 3:48 |
| 4 | The Killer Bees (Jim Brunzell and B. Brian Blair) defeated The Hart Foundation (Bret Hart and Jim Neidhart) (with Jimmy Hart) | Tag team match | 9:00 |
| 5 | Koko B. Ware defeated Nikolai Volkoff (with Slick) | Singles match | 2:30 |
| 6 | The Magnificent Muraco (with Mr. Fuji) defeated Dick Slater | Singles match | 2:05 |
(c) / – the champion(s) heading into the match

==== Saturday Night's Main Event IX ====
Saturday Night's Main Event IX
- Promotion: World Wrestling Federation
- Date: December 14, 1986 (aired January 3, 1987)
- City: Hartford, Connecticut
- Venue: Hartford Civic Center
- Attendance: 10,000

Saturday Night's Main Event chronology
| ← Previous; VIII | Next → X |

Saturday Night's Main Event IX took place on December 14, 1986, from Hartford, Connecticut, at the Hartford Civic Center, and aired on January 3, 1987. The event aired on NBC and drew a 10.6 rating.

The steel cage match between Hulk Hogan and Paul Orndorff was initially declared a draw when both wrestlers escaped the cage at approximately the same time and two referees – Joey Marella and Danny Davis, the latter playing up his crooked referee gimmick – disputing the finish. When footage from the escape spot was deemed "inconclusive," the match was re-started and continued with Hogan gaining a decisive win over Orndorff.

| No. | Results | Stipulations | Times |
|---|---|---|---|
| 1 | Hulk Hogan (c) defeated Paul Orndorff (with Bobby Heenan) by escaping the cage | Steel cage match for the WWF World Heavyweight Championship | 10:42 |
| 2 | Randy Savage (c) (with Miss Elizabeth) defeated George Steele (with Ricky Steamboat) | Singles match for the WWF Intercontinental Championship | 8:30 |
| 3 | Junkyard Dog defeated Harley Race (with Bobby Heenan) by disqualification | Singles match | 6:00 |
| 4 | Adrian Adonis (with Jimmy Hart) defeated Roddy Piper by countout | Singles match | 3:35 |
| 5 | Blackjack Mulligan defeated Jimmy Jack Funk | Singles match | 2:31 |
(c) / – the champion(s) heading into the match

==== Saturday Night's Main Event X ====
Saturday Night's Main Event X
- Promotion: World Wrestling Federation
- Date: February 21, 1987 (aired March 14, 1987)
- City: Detroit, Michigan
- Venue: Joe Louis Arena
- Attendance: 21,000

Saturday Night's Main Event chronology
| ← Previous; IX | Next → XI |

Saturday Night's Main Event X took place on February 21, 1987, from Detroit, Michigan, at the Joe Louis Arena, and aired on March 14, 1987. The event aired on NBC and drew an 11.6 rating.

The highlight match was a 20-man battle royal featuring Hulk Hogan and Andre the Giant. This was the first Saturday Night's Main Event special aired after Andre's heel turn several weeks earlier, and was used as build-up to their main event match at WrestleMania III.

| No. | Results | Stipulations | Times |
|---|---|---|---|
| 1 | Randy Savage (c) defeated George Steele by countout with Miss Elizabeth in a neutral corner. | Singles match for the WWF Intercontinental Championship and the managerial services of Miss Elizabeth | 4:30 |
| 2 | Hercules won by last eliminating Billy Jack Haynes (Note: Order of elimination from first eliminated: The Honky Tonk Man eliminated by Hogan; Sika eliminated by Andre; Haku eliminated by Andre; Lanny Poffo eliminated by Andre; Ron Bass eliminated by Hogan; Blackjack Mulligan eliminated by Andre; Nikolai Volkoff eliminated by Hogan; B. Brian Blair eliminated by Andre; Paul Orndorff eliminated by Hogan; Hulk Hogan eliminated by Andre; Jumping Jim Brunzell eliminated by Andre; Andre the Giant eliminated by Hillbilly Jim, Demolition, Billy Jack Haynes, Butch Reed, Tama and Koko B. Ware; Tama eliminated by Hercules; Ax eliminated by Hillbilly Jim; Hillbilly Jim eliminated by Smash; Butch Reed eliminated by Koko B. Ware; Koko B. Ware eliminated by Hercules; Smash eliminated by Billy Jack Haynes; Billy Jack Haynes eliminated by Hercules (when Haynes was distracted by Bobby Heenan).) | Battle Royal | 11:16 |
| 3 | King Kong Bundy (with Bobby Heenan) defeated Jake Roberts by disqualification | Singles match | 6:14 |
| 4 | The Hart Foundation (Bret Hart and Jim Neidhart) (c) (with Jimmy Hart and Danny Davis) defeated Tito Santana and Dan Spivey | Tag team match for the WWF Tag Team Championship | 5:31 |
| 5 | Ricky Steamboat defeated The Iron Sheik (with Slick) | Singles match | 3:29 |
(c) / – the champion(s) heading into the match

==== Saturday Night's Main Event XI ====
Saturday Night's Main Event XI
- Promotion: World Wrestling Federation
- Date: April 28, 1987 (aired May 2, 1987)
- City: Notre Dame, Indiana
- Venue: Edmund P. Joyce Center
- Attendance: 9,345

Saturday Night's Main Event chronology
| ← Previous; X | Next → XII |

Saturday Night's Main Event XI took place on April 28, 1987, from Notre Dame, Indiana, at the Edmund P. Joyce Center, and aired May 2, 1987. The event aired on NBC and drew a 9.5 rating.

While a match featuring Hulk Hogan was not included in the show, a pre-taped interview with comments regarding WrestleMania III and a possible future rematch was teased. A separate interview with Andre the Giant and Bobby Heenan, also reflecting on WrestleMania III, also aired.

| No. | Results | Stipulations | Times |
|---|---|---|---|
| 1 | Kamala (with The Honky Tonk Man and Mr. Fuji) defeated Jake Roberts | Singles match | 4:18 |
| 2 | Randy Savage (with Miss Elizabeth) defeated George Steele | Lumberjack match | 6:44 |
| 3 | The British Bulldogs (Davey Boy Smith and Dynamite Kid) (with Tito Santana) defeated The Hart Foundation (Bret Hart and Jim Neidhart) (c) (with Jimmy Hart and Danny Davis) by disqualification | Two-out-of-three-falls match for the WWF Tag Team Championship | 9:48 |
| 4 | Ricky Steamboat (c) defeated Hercules (with Bobby Heenan) by disqualification | Singles match for the WWF Intercontinental Championship | 6:42 |
| 5 | The Can-Am Connection (Rick Martel and Tom Zenk) (with Jim Duggan) defeated Nikolai Volkoff and The Iron Sheik (with Slick) | Tag team match | 4:45 |
(c) / – the champion(s) heading into the match

==== Saturday Night's Main Event XII ====
Saturday Night's Main Event XII
- Promotion: World Wrestling Federation
- Date: September 23, 1987 (aired October 3, 1987)
- City: Hershey, Pennsylvania
- Venue: Hersheypark Arena
- Attendance: 9,000

Saturday Night's Main Event chronology
| ← Previous; XI | Next → XIII |

Saturday Night's Main Event XII took place on September 23, 1987, from Hershey, Pennsylvania, at the Hersheypark Arena, and aired October 3, 1987. The event aired on NBC and drew a 9.7 rating.

As the result of events during the Randy Savage vs. The Honky Tonk Man match – a beatdown of Savage by Honky and The Hart Foundation, and Hulk Hogan running in to save Savage – The Mega Powers alliance of Hogan, Savage and Miss Elizabeth was formed. The music video for "Piledriver" (as performed by Koko B. Ware), the title track of the WWF's second album of entrance music and performances by the wrestlers, debuted.

| No. | Results | Stipulations | Times |
|---|---|---|---|
| 1 | Randy Savage (with Miss Elizabeth) defeated The Honky Tonk Man (c) (with Jimmy Hart) by disqualification | Singles match for the WWF Intercontinental Championship | 13:00 |
| 2 | Hulk Hogan (c) defeated Sika (with Mr. Fuji and Kim Chee) | Singles match for the WWF World Heavyweight Championship | 7:59 |
| 3 | King Kong Bundy (with André the Giant) defeated Paul Orndorff (with Oliver Humperdink) | Singles match | 8:00 |
| 4 | The Hart Foundation (Bret Hart and Jim Neidhart) (c) defeated The Young Stallions (Paul Roma and Jim Powers) | Tag team match for the WWF Tag Team Championship | 4:35 |
(c) / – the champion(s) heading into the match

==== Saturday Night's Main Event XIII ====
Saturday Night's Main Event XIII
- Promotion: World Wrestling Federation
- Date: November 11, 1987 (aired November 28, 1987)
- City: Seattle, Washington
- Venue: Seattle Center Coliseum
- Attendance: 16,000

Saturday Night's Main Event chronology
| ← Previous; XII | Next → XIV |

Saturday Night's Main Event XIII took place on November 11, 1987, from Seattle, Washington, at the Seattle Center Coliseum, and aired November 28, 1987 on NBC.

Andre the Giant accompanied King Kong Bundy and Bobby Heenan to the ring for Bundy's match vs. Hulk Hogan. Midway through the match, Andre was ejected from ringside for attempting to interfere in the match; as he returned to the locker room, he shoved a WWF cameraman to the floor. Following the match, Hogan injured Bobby Heenan with a series of hanging necklifts after Heenan had caused Hogan to be counted out; this set up a rematch for the next Saturday Night's Main Event between Hogan and Bundy.

Brian Bosworth, linebacker for the Seattle Seahawks, was shown in the audience.

| No. | Results | Stipulations | Times |
|---|---|---|---|
| 1 | George Steele defeated Danny Davis by disqualification | Singles match | 3:49 |
| 2 | Randy Savage (with Miss Elizabeth) defeated Bret Hart (with Jimmy Hart and Jim Neidhart) | Singles match | 12:03 |
| 3 | King Kong Bundy (with Bobby Heenan) defeated Hulk Hogan (c) by countout | Singles match for the WWF World Heavyweight Championship | 13:45 |
| 4 | Bam Bam Bigelow (with Oliver Humperdink) defeated Hercules | Singles match | 7:00 |
(c) / – the champion(s) heading into the match

==== Saturday Night's Main Event XIV ====
Saturday Night's Main Event XIV
- Promotion: World Wrestling Federation
- Date: December 7, 1987 (aired January 2, 1988)
- City: Landover, Maryland
- Venue: Capital Centre
- Attendance: 11,000

Saturday Night's Main Event chronology
| ← Previous; XIII | Next → XV |

Saturday Night's Main Event XIV took place on December 7, 1987, from Landover, Maryland, at the Capital Centre, and aired on January 2, 1988 on NBC.

During the Hulk Hogan-King Kong Bundy match, referee Jack Krueger was accidentally caught and knocked out by Bundy in an attempt to avalanche Hogan; the match was briefly interrupted as a new referee, Dave Hebner, took Krueger's place. Following the match, Andre the Giant – who accompanied Bundy to the ring for the match, in place of Bobby Heenan – sneak-attacked Hogan and choked him to the brink of unconsciousness, fighting off several wrestlers who came to aid Hogan; this served as one of the build-ups to the Hogan-Andre match on The Main Event, which aired February 5, 1988.

| No. | Results | Stipulations | Times |
|---|---|---|---|
| 1 | Strike Force (Tito Santana and Rick Martel) (c) defeated The Bolsheviks (Nikolai Volkoff and Boris Zuhkov) (with Slick) | Two-out-of-three-falls match for the WWF Tag Team Championship | 7:55 |
| 2 | Jake Roberts defeated Sika (with Mr. Fuji) | Singles match | 3:35 |
| 3 | Hulk Hogan (c) defeated King Kong Bundy (with André the Giant) | Singles match for the WWF World Heavyweight Championship | 12:09 |
| 4 | Greg Valentine (with Jimmy Hart) defeated Koko B. Ware by submission | Singles match | 7:30 |
(c) / – the champion(s) heading into the match

==== Saturday Night's Main Event XV ====
Saturday Night's Main Event XV
- Promotion: World Wrestling Federation
- Date: March 7, 1988 (aired March 12, 1988)
- City: Nashville, Tennessee
- Venue: Nashville Municipal Auditorium
- Attendance: 10,000

Saturday Night's Main Event chronology
| ← Previous; XIV | Next → XVI |

Saturday Night's Main Event XV took place on March 7, 1988, from Nashville, Tennessee, at the Nashville Municipal Auditorium, and aired on March 12, 1988. Although there were 10,000 in attendance, it was reportedly a heavily papered event. The event aired on NBC and drew a 10.0 rating.

During the tapings, Don Muraco vs Butch Reed was taped but aired on Prime Time Wrestling on April 11, 1988.

The match between Hulk Hogan and Harley Race saw Race lay Hogan across a table outside the ring and attempted to hit a diving headbutt from the ring apron, but Hogan moved out of the way and Race crashed through the table, suffering a legitimate injury that would eventually force him into retirement in 1991.

After the Ted DiBiase and André the Giant match, Hogan appeared at ringside to clear the ring of DiBiase and Virgil after they began a post-match beatdown of Randy "Macho Man" Savage.

The match between The Islanders (Haku and Tama) and The Killer Bees (Jim Brunzell and B. Brian Blair) was a two-out-of-three-falls match, however only the first fall was televised.

| No. | Results | Stipulations | Times |
|---|---|---|---|
| 1 | Brutus Beefcake defeated Greg Valentine (with Jimmy Hart) | Singles match | 9:02 |
| 2 | Hulk Hogan defeated Harley Race (with Bobby Heenan) | Singles match | 6:37 |
| 3 | Ted DiBiase (with Virgil and André the Giant) defeated Randy Savage (with Miss Elizabeth) by countout | Singles match | 11:39 |
| 4 | The Islanders (Haku and Tama) (with Bobby Heenan) defeated The Killer Bees (Jim Brunzell and B. Brian Blair) | Two-out-of-three-falls match | 3:38 |
| 5 | One Man Gang (with Slick) defeated Ken Patera | Singles match | 3:47 |

==== Saturday Night's Main Event XVI ====
Saturday Night's Main Event XVI
- Promotion: World Wrestling Federation
- Date: April 22, 1988 (aired April 30, 1988)
- City: Springfield, Massachusetts
- Venue: Springfield Civic Center
- Attendance: 9,000

Saturday Night's Main Event chronology
| ← Previous; XV | Next → XVII |

Saturday Night's Main Event XVI took place on April 22, 1988, from Springfield, Massachusetts, at the Springfield Civic Center, and aired April 30, 1988 on NBC. This was the first Saturday Night's Main Event to not feature Hulk Hogan in any of the televised matches or interviews, as he had taken a leave of absence around this time to begin filming No Holds Barred.

| No. | Results | Stipulations | Times |
|---|---|---|---|
| 1 | Jim Duggan defeated Hercules (with Bobby Heenan and André the Giant) by disqualification | Singles match | 8:47 |
| 2 | Brutus Beefcake defeated Danny Davis (with Jimmy Hart) | Singles match | 3:10 |
| 3 | Randy Savage (c) (with Miss Elizabeth) defeated One Man Gang (with Slick) | Singles match for the WWF World Heavyweight Championship | 6:03 |
| 4 | Demolition (Ax and Smash) (with Mr. Fuji) defeated The British Bulldogs (Davey Boy Smith and Dynamite Kid) by disqualification | Tag team match | 5:05 |
| 5 | Ted DiBiase (with Virgil) defeated Don Muraco (with Billy Graham) | Singles match | 4:12 |
| 6 | Rick Rude (with Bobby Heenan) defeated Koko B. Ware | Singles match | 3:44 |
(c) / – the champion(s) heading into the match

==== Saturday Night's Main Event XVII ====
Saturday Night's Main Event XVII
- Promotion: World Wrestling Federation
- Date: October 25, 1988 (aired October 29, 1988)
- City: Baltimore, Maryland
- Venue: Baltimore Arena

Saturday Night's Main Event chronology
| ← Previous; XVI | Next → XVIII |

Saturday Night's Main Event XVII took place on October 25, 1988, from Baltimore, Maryland, at the Baltimore Arena, and aired October 29, 1988. The event aired on NBC and drew an 8.7 rating.

| No. | Results | Stipulations | Times |
|---|---|---|---|
| 1 | Jake Roberts (with Cheryl Roberts) defeated Rick Rude (with Bobby Heenan) by disqualification | Singles match | 7:22 |
| 2 | Demolition (Ax and Smash) (c) (with Mr. Fuji and Jimmy Hart) defeated The Hart Foundation (Bret Hart and Jim Neidhart) | Tag team match for the WWF Tag Team Championship | 5:58 |
| 3 | Hulk Hogan (with Miss Elizabeth) defeated King Haku (with Bobby Heenan) | Singles match | 6:16 |
| 4 | Dino Bravo (with Frenchy Martin) defeated Ken Patera | Singles match | 3:03 |
| 5 | Big Boss Man (with Slick) defeated Jim Powers | Singles match | 2:34 |
(c) / – the champion(s) heading into the match

==== Saturday Night's Main Event XVIII ====
Saturday Night's Main Event XVIII
- Promotion: World Wrestling Federation
- Date: November 16, 1988 (aired November 26, 1988)
- City: Sacramento, California
- Venue: ARCO Arena
- Attendance: 15,900

Saturday Night's Main Event chronology
| ← Previous; XVII | Next → XIX |

Saturday Night's Main Event XVIII took place on November 16, 1988, from Sacramento, California, at the ARCO Arena, and aired November 26, 1988. The event aired on NBC and drew a 9.4 rating.

During the show, Brother Love conducted a special interview with Hulk Hogan and Slick.

| No. | Results | Stipulations | Times |
|---|---|---|---|
| 1 | Ultimate Warrior (c) defeated Super Ninja (with Mr. Fuji) | Singles match for the WWF Intercontinental Championship | 2:11 |
| 2 | Hercules defeated Virgil (with Ted DiBiase) | Singles match | 3:20 |
| 3 | Randy Savage (c) (with Miss Elizabeth) vs. André the Giant (with Bobby Heenan) ended in a double disqualification | Singles match for the WWF World Heavyweight Championship | 8:51 |
| 4 | Jim Duggan defeated Boris Zuhkov | Flag match | 2:27 |
| 5 | The Fabulous Rougeaus (Jacques Rougeau and Raymond Rougeau) (with Jimmy Hart) defeated The Young Stallions (Paul Roma and Jim Powers) | Tag team match | 3:05 |
(c) / – the champion(s) heading into the match

==== Saturday Night's Main Event XIX ====
Saturday Night's Main Event XIX
- Promotion: World Wrestling Federation
- Date: December 7, 1988 (aired January 7, 1989)
- City: Tampa, Florida
- Venue: USF Sun Dome
- Attendance: 9,176

Saturday Night's Main Event chronology
| ← Previous; XVIII | Next → XX |

Television special chronology
| ← Previous; Saturday Night's Main Event XVIII | Next → The Main Event II |

Saturday Night's Main Event XIX took place on December 7, 1988, from Tampa, Florida, at the USF Sun Dome, and aired January 7, 1989 on NBC.

Events during and after the Hulk Hogan-Akeem match – Randy Savage declining to make the save and run off Akeem and Big Boss Man while they were beating down Hogan, but Savage immediately running to ringside when the heels were threatening to beat up Miss Elizabeth, and then Savage questioning Elizabeth as she tended to a beaten Hogan – helped foreshadow the later heel turn by Savage at The Main Event II in February.

George Steinbrenner was shown in the front row during this event, and Bobby "The Brain" Heenan at one point remarked about the guy he managed in the ring at the time to Steinbrenner "I've got a ring full of Winfields".

| No. | Results | Stipulations | Times |
|---|---|---|---|
| 1 | Brutus Beefcake defeated Ron Bass | Hair vs. Hair match | 7:40 |
| 2 | Hulk Hogan (with Miss Elizabeth) defeated Akeem (with Big Boss Man and Slick) by disqualification | Singles match | 8:06 |
| 3 | Ultimate Warrior (c) defeated The Honky Tonk Man (with Jimmy Hart) | Singles match for the WWF Intercontinental Championship | 5:07 |
| 4 | Tito Santana defeated The Red Rooster (with Bobby Heenan) | Singles match | 7:27 |
| 5 | Mr. Perfect defeated Koko B. Ware | Singles match | 3:10 |
(c) / – the champion(s) heading into the match

==== Saturday Night's Main Event XX ====
Saturday Night's Main Event XX
- Promotion: World Wrestling Federation
- Date: February 16, 1989 (aired March 11, 1989)
- City: Hershey, Pennsylvania
- Venue: Hersheypark Arena
- Attendance: 9,000

Saturday Night's Main Event chronology
| ← Previous; XIX | Next → XXI |

Television special chronology
| ← Previous; The Main Event II | Next → Saturday Night's Main Event XXI |

Saturday Night's Main Event XX took place on February 16, 1989, from Hershey, Pennsylvania, at the Hersheypark Arena, and aired March 11, 1989. The event aired on NBC and drew a 10.0 rating.

During the event, Mean Gene Okerlund conducted a special interview with Miss Elizabeth to publicly announce whose corner she will be in at WrestleMania V.

| No. | Results | Stipulations | Times |
|---|---|---|---|
| 1 | Brutus Beefcake defeated Rick Rude (with Bobby Heenan) by disqualification | Singles match | 5:45 |
| 2 | Hulk Hogan (with Miss Elizabeth) defeated Bad News Brown | Singles match | 09:44 |
| 3 | Ted DiBiase (with Virgil) defeated The Blue Blazer | Singles match | 3:57 |
| 4 | The Brain Busters (Arn Anderson and Tully Blanchard) (with Bobby Heenan) vs. The Rockers (Shawn Michaels and Marty Jannetty) ended in a double countout | Tag team match | 9:19 |
| 5 | The Red Rooster defeated The Brooklyn Brawler (with Bobby Heenan) | Singles match | 1:05 |

==== Saturday Night's Main Event XXI ====
Saturday Night's Main Event XXI
- Promotion: World Wrestling Federation
- Date: April 25, 1989 (aired May 27, 1989)
- City: Des Moines, Iowa
- Venue: Veterans Memorial Auditorium

Saturday Night's Main Event chronology
| ← Previous; XX | Next → XXII |

Saturday Night's Main Event XXI took place on April 25, 1989, from Des Moines, Iowa, at the Veterans Memorial Auditorium, and aired May 27, 1989 on NBC.

During the steel cage match between Hulk Hogan and Big Boss Man, Hogan superplexed Boss Man from over the top of the cage to the mat, briefly knocking both wrestlers out. Prior to the match, Tommy Lister Jr., in-character as his No Holds Barred movie role of Zeus (the movie's villain), came to ringside and stood in front of the cage entrance, beating down Hogan after daring him to "move me!"

| No. | Results | Stipulations | Times |
|---|---|---|---|
| 1 | King Duggan defeated Rick Rude (c) (with Bobby Heenan) by countout | Singles match for the WWF Intercontinental Championship | 7:15 |
| 2 | Randy Savage (with Sensational Sherri) defeated Jim Neidhart | Singles match | 5:54 |
| 3 | Hulk Hogan (c) defeated Big Boss Man (with Slick) by escaping the cage | Steel cage match for the WWF World Heavyweight Championship | 10:01 |
| 4 | The Brain Busters (Arn Anderson and Tully Blanchard) (with Bobby Heenan) defeated Demolition (Ax and Smash) (c) by disqualification | Tag team match for the WWF Tag Team Championship | 9:15 |
| 5 | Jimmy Snuka defeated Boris Zhukov (with Slick) | Singles match | 1:11 |
(c) / – the champion(s) heading into the match

==== Saturday Night's Main Event XXII ====
Saturday Night's Main Event XXII
- Promotion: World Wrestling Federation
- Date: July 18, 1989 (aired July 29, 1989)
- City: Worcester, Massachusetts
- Venue: Worcester Centrum

Saturday Night's Main Event chronology
| ← Previous; XXI | Next → XXIII |

Saturday Night's Main Event XXII took place on July 18, 1989, from Worcester, Massachusetts, at the Worcester Centrum, and aired July 29, 1989 on NBC.

During the Randy Savage-Brutus Beefcake match, Zeus appeared at ringside and interfered on Savage's behalf. Hulk Hogan came to aid Beefcake but was unable to hurt Zeus. The events of this match was one of the pieces to help set up the main event of SummerSlam. The show also featured the first time a title changed hands in the program's history.

| No. | Results | Stipulations | Times |
|---|---|---|---|
| 1 | Hulk Hogan (c) defeated The Honky Tonk Man (with Jimmy Hart) | Singles match for the WWF World Heavyweight Championship | 6:14 |
| 2 | Jimmy Snuka defeated Greg Valentine (with Jimmy Hart) | Singles match | 3:14 |
| 3 | Brutus Beefcake defeated Randy Savage (with Sensational Sherri) by disqualification | Singles match | 11:30 |
| 4 | The Brain Busters (Arn Anderson and Tully Blanchard) (with Bobby Heenan) defeated Demolition (Ax and Smash) (c) | Tag Team Two-out-of-three-falls match for the WWF Tag Team Championship | 12:33 |
(c) / – the champion(s) heading into the match

==== Saturday Night's Main Event XXIII ====
Saturday Night's Main Event XXIII
- Promotion: World Wrestling Federation
- Date: September 21, 1989 (aired October 14, 1989)
- City: Cincinnati, Ohio
- Venue: Riverfront Coliseum
- Attendance: 14,000

Saturday Night's Main Event chronology
| ← Previous; XXII | Next → XXIV |

Television special chronology
| ← Previous; Saturday Night's Main Event XXII | Next → WWF on Sky One |

Saturday Night's Main Event XXIII took place September 21, 1989, from Cincinnati, Ohio, at the Riverfront Coliseum, and aired October 14, 1989. The show was attended by 14,000 people, of which 12,000 were paid. The event aired on NBC and drew a 9.5 rating.

| No. | Results | Stipulations | Times |
|---|---|---|---|
| 1 | Randy Savage (with Queen Sherri) defeated Jimmy Snuka | Singles match | 5:37 |
| 2 | Hulk Hogan (c) defeated Ted DiBiase (with Zeus) | Singles match for the WWF Championship | 9:28 |
| 3 | Roddy Piper defeated Haku (with Bobby Heenan) | Singles match | 3:02 |
| 4 | Tito Santana (with The Red Rooster, Brutus Beefcake, and Dusty Rhodes) vs. Rick Martel (with Jimmy Hart, The Honky Tonk Man, Slick, Akeem and Big Boss Man) ended in a double disqualification | Singles match | 9:41 |
| 5 | The Bushwhackers (Luke and Butch) defeated The Fabulous Rougeaus (Jacques Rougeau and Raymond Rougeau) (with Jimmy Hart) | Tag team match | 3:15 |
(c) / – the champion(s) heading into the match

==== Saturday Night's Main Event XXIV ====
Saturday Night's Main Event XXIV
- Promotion: World Wrestling Federation
- Date: October 31, 1989 (aired November 25, 1989)
- City: Topeka, Kansas
- Venue: Sunflower State Expocentre

Saturday Night's Main Event chronology
| ← Previous; XXIII | Next → XXV |

Television special chronology
| ← Previous; WWF on Sky One | Next → Survivor Series Showdown |

Saturday Night's Main Event XXIV took place October 31, 1989, from Topeka, Kansas, at the Sunflower State Expocentre, and aired November 25, 1989. The event aired on NBC and drew an 8.7 rating.

| No. | Results | Stipulations | Times |
|---|---|---|---|
| 1 | Ultimate Warrior (c) defeated André the Giant (with Bobby Heenan) by disqualification | Singles match for the WWF Intercontinental Championship | 7:46 |
| 2 | The Genius defeated Hulk Hogan (c) by countout | Singles match for the WWF Championship | 7:34 |
| 3 | Dusty Rhodes defeated Big Boss Man (with Slick) | Singles match | 4:47 |
| 4 | Mr. Perfect (with The Genius) defeated The Red Rooster | Singles match | 4:13 |
| 5 | The Rockers (Shawn Michaels and Marty Jannetty) defeated The Brain Busters (Arn Anderson and Tully Blanchard) (with Bobby Heenan) | Two-out-of-three-falls match | 7:32 |
(c) / – the champion(s) heading into the match

=== 1990s ===
==== Saturday Night's Main Event XXV ====
Saturday Night's Main Event XXV
- Promotion: World Wrestling Federation
- Date: January 3, 1990 (aired January 27, 1990)
- City: Chattanooga, Tennessee
- Venue: UTC Arena

Saturday Night's Main Event chronology
| ← Previous; XXIV | Next → XXVI |

Television special chronology
| ← Previous; Survivor Series Showdown | Next → The Main Event III |

Saturday Night's Main Event XXV took place January 3, 1990, from Chattanooga, Tennessee, at the UTC Arena, and aired January 27, 1990. The event aired on NBC and drew an 11.1 rating.

| No. | Results | Stipulations | Times |
|---|---|---|---|
| 1 | Randy Savage (with Queen Sherri) defeated Jim Duggan | Singles match | 9:14 |
| 2 | Hulk Hogan and Ultimate Warrior defeated Mr. Perfect and The Genius | Tag team match | 8:02 |
| 3 | Jake Roberts defeated Greg Valentine (with Jimmy Hart) by disqualification | Singles match | 5:16 |
| 4 | Dusty Rhodes (with Sapphire) vs. Rick Rude (with Bobby Heenan) ended in a double countout | Singles match | 9:04 |
| 5 | Dino Bravo (with Jimmy Hart and Earthquake) defeated Ron Garvin | Singles match | 3:19 |

==== Saturday Night's Main Event XXVI ====
Saturday Night's Main Event XXVI
- Promotion: World Wrestling Federation
- Date: April 23, 1990 (aired April 28, 1990)
- City: Austin, Texas
- Venue: Frank Erwin Center
- Attendance: 8,500

Saturday Night's Main Event chronology
| ← Previous; XXV | Next → XXVII |

Television special chronology
| ← Previous; Wrestling Summit | Next → Saturday Night's Main Event XXVII |

Saturday Night's Main Event XXVI took place on April 23, 1990, from Austin, Texas, at the Frank Erwin Center, and aired April 28, 1990 on NBC.

| No. | Results | Stipulations | Times |
|---|---|---|---|
| 1 | Hulk Hogan defeated Mr. Perfect (with The Genius) | Singles match | 08:03 |
| 2 | Earthquake (with Jimmy Hart) defeated Hillbilly Jim | Singles match | 01:58 |
| 3 | The Hart Foundation (Bret Hart and Jim Neidhart) vs. The Rockers (Shawn Michaels and Marty Jannetty) ended in a double disqualification | Tag team match | 09:30 |
| 4 | Ultimate Warrior (c) defeated Haku (with Bobby Heenan) | Singles match for the WWF World Heavyweight Championship | 04:49 |
| 5 | Big Boss Man defeated Akeem (with Slick) by disqualification | Singles match | 03:18 |
(c) / – the champion(s) heading into the match

==== Saturday Night's Main Event XXVII ====
Saturday Night's Main Event XXVII
- Promotion: World Wrestling Federation
- Date: July 16, 1990 (aired July 28, 1990)
- City: Omaha, Nebraska
- Venue: Omaha Civic Auditorium
- Attendance: 10,303

Saturday Night's Main Event chronology
| ← Previous; XXVI | Next → XXVIII |

Television special chronology
| ← Previous; Saturday Night's Main Event XXVI | Next → SummerSlam Fever |

Saturday Night's Main Event XXVII took place July 16, 1990, from Omaha, Nebraska, at the Omaha Civic Auditorium, and aired July 28, 1990. The event aired on NBC and drew a 7.2 rating.

This event saw the WWF debut of The Texas Tornado.

| No. | Results | Stipulations | Times |
|---|---|---|---|
| 1 | Ultimate Warrior (c) defeated Rick Rude (with Bobby Heenan) by disqualification | Singles match for the WWF Championship | 9:43 |
| 2 | Demolition (Smash and Crush) (c) (with Ax) defeated The Rockers (Shawn Michaels and Marty Jannetty) | Tag team match for the WWF Tag Team Championship | 9:31 |
| 3 | Mr. Perfect (with Bobby Heenan) (c) defeated Tito Santana | Singles match for the WWF Intercontinental Championship | 10:11 |
| 4 | The Texas Tornado defeated Buddy Rose | Singles match | 3:09 |
(c) / – the champion(s) heading into the match

==== Saturday Night's Main Event XXVIII ====
Saturday Night's Main Event XXVIII
- Promotion: World Wrestling Federation
- Date: September 18, 1990 (aired October 13, 1990)
- City: Toledo, Ohio
- Venue: Toledo Sports Arena

Saturday Night's Main Event chronology
| ← Previous; XXVII | Next → XXIX |

Television special chronology
| ← Previous; SummerSlam Fever | Next → The Main Event IV |

Saturday Night's Main Event XXVIII took place September 18, 1990, from Toledo, Ohio, at the Toledo Sports Arena, and aired October 13, 1990 on NBC.

During the match between Randy Savage and Dusty Rhodes, Ted DiBiase attacked Dusty's son Dustin Rhodes.

| No. | Results | Stipulations | Times |
|---|---|---|---|
| 1 | Ultimate Warrior and The Legion of Doom (Hawk and Animal) defeated Demolition (Ax, Smash, and Crush) | Six-man tag team match | 4:59 |
| 2 | Randy Savage (with Queen Sherri) defeated Dusty Rhodes by countout | Singles match | 9:30 |
| 3 | Hulk Hogan and Tugboat defeated Rhythm and Blues (The Honky Tonk Man and Greg Valentine) (with Jimmy Hart) by disqualification | Tag team match | 7:20 |
| 4 | The Texas Tornado (c) defeated Haku (with Bobby Heenan) | Singles match for the WWF Intercontinental Championship | 3:10 |
| 5 | Sgt. Slaughter (with Gen. Adnan) defeated Koko B. Ware by submission | Singles match | 5:18 |
(c) / – the champion(s) heading into the match

==== Saturday Night's Main Event XXIX ====
Saturday Night's Main Event XXIX
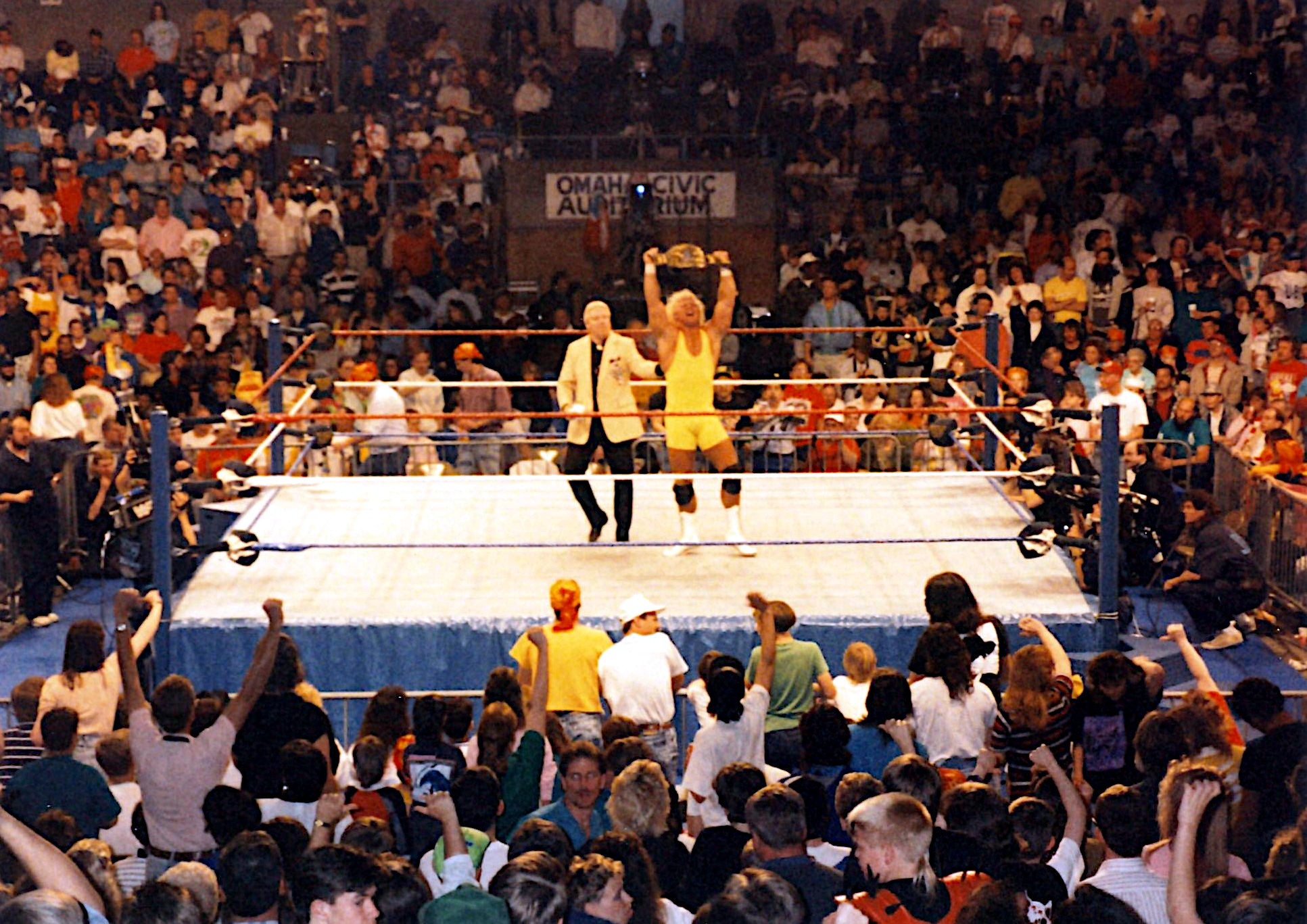
- Mr. Perfect holding up the Intercontinental Championship after winning the battle royal
- Promotion: World Wrestling Federation
- Date: April 15, 1991 (aired April 27, 1991)
- City: Omaha, Nebraska
- Venue: Omaha Civic Auditorium
- Attendance: 9,400

Saturday Night's Main Event chronology
| ← Previous; XXVIII | Next → XXX |

Television special chronology
| ← Previous; WrestleFest Tokyo | Next → UK Rampage |

Saturday Night's Main Event XXIX took place April 15, 1991, from Omaha, Nebraska, at the Omaha Civic Auditorium, and aired April 27, 1991. The event drew 9,400 people of which 7,000 were paid. The event aired on NBC and drew a 7.7 rating. Following this event, Saturday Night's Main Event aired two episodes on Fox in 1992, the series then ended until returning to NBC for 5 additional specials beginning in 2006 with Saturday Night's Main Event XXXII.

| No. | Results | Stipulations | Times |
|---|---|---|---|
| 1 | Ultimate Warrior defeated Sgt. Slaughter (with General Adnan and Col. Mustafa) by disqualification | Singles match | 8:00 |
| 2 | The Nasty Boys (Brian Knobbs and Jerry Sags) (c) (with Jimmy Hart) defeated The Bushwhackers (Bushwhacker Luke and Bushwhacker Butch) | Tag team match for the WWF Tag Team Championship | 6:48 |
| 3 | Mr. Perfect won by last eliminating Greg Valentine (Note: Order of elimination from first eliminated: Paul Roma eliminated by Marty Jannetty; Marty Jannetty eliminated by Roma; The British Bulldog eliminated by The Warlord; Tanaka eliminated by Jimmy Snuka; Jimmy Snuka eliminated by Haku; Jake Roberts eliminated by Earthquake; The Warlord eliminated by Hogan; The Texas Tornado eliminated by The Barbarian; Jim Duggan eliminated by Earthquake; Earthquake eliminated by Hogan; Kato eliminated by Tugboat; Hulk Hogan eliminated by Tugboat; Tugboat eliminated by Shawn Michaels; Hercules eliminated by Boss Man; The Big Boss Man eliminated by The Barbarian; Haku eliminated by Shawn Michaels; Shawn Michaels eliminated by Perfect; The Barbarian eliminated by Greg Valentine; Greg Valentine eliminated by Perfect) | Battle Royal | 12:30 |
| 4 | Ted DiBiase (with Sensational Sherri) vs. Bret Hart ended in a double countout | Singles match | 9:56 |
| 5 | The Mountie (with Jimmy Hart) defeated Tito Santana | Singles match | 4:29 |
(c) / – the champion(s) heading into the match

==== Saturday Night's Main Event XXX ====
Saturday Night's Main Event XXX
- Promotion: World Wrestling Federation
- Date: January 27, 1992 (aired February 8, 1992)
- City: Lubbock, Texas
- Venue: Lubbock Municipal Coliseum

Saturday Night's Main Event chronology
| ← Previous; XXIX | Next → XXXI |

Television special chronology
| ← Previous; SuperWrestle | Next → March to WrestleMania VIII |

Saturday Night's Main Event XXX took place on January 27, 1992, from Lubbock, Texas, at the Lubbock Municipal Coliseum, and aired February 8, 1992. The event was the first Saturday Night's Main Event to air on Fox and drew an 8.2 rating and 14.3 million viewers.

Prematch stipulation of the Roddy Piper and The Mountie match for the WWF Intercontinental Championship, stated Bret Hart would face the winner at WrestleMania VIII.

The Legion of Doom (Road Warrior Hawk and Road Warrior Animal) were originally scheduled to take on The Beverly Brothers (Blake Beverly and Beau Beverly), however The Legion of Doom were replaced by Sgt. Slaughter and Jim Duggan.

Following the match between Randy Savage and Jake Roberts, the telecast ended with Miss Elizabeth coming to the ring and celebrating with Savage. A week later during Superstars, it was revealed that Roberts prepared to hit Miss Elizabeth with a steel chair as soon as she stepped backstage, only for The Undertaker to prevent the attack and allow Savage to hit Roberts with a chair of his own.

| No. | Results | Stipulations | Times |
|---|---|---|---|
| 1 | Roddy Piper (c) defeated The Mountie (with Jimmy Hart) | Singles match for the WWF Intercontinental Championship | 3:30 |
| 2 | Hulk Hogan and Sid Justice (with Brutus Beefcake) defeated Ric Flair and The Undertaker (with Mr. Perfect and Paul Bearer) by disqualification | Tag team match | 11:42 |
| 3 | Sgt. Slaughter and Jim Duggan defeated The Beverly Brothers (Blake Beverly and Beau Beverly) (with The Genius) | Tag team match | 2:39 |
| 4 | Randy Savage (with Miss Elizabeth) defeated Jake Roberts | Singles match | 5:25 |
(c) / – the champion(s) heading into the match

==== Saturday Night's Main Event XXXI ====
Saturday Night's Main Event XXXI
- Promotion: World Wrestling Federation
- Date: October 27, 1992 (aired November 14, 1992)
- City: Terre Haute, Indiana
- Venue: Hulman Center
- Attendance: 4,300

Saturday Night's Main Event chronology
| ← Previous; XXX | Next → XXXII |

Television special chronology
| ← Previous; SummerSlam Spectacular | Next → Survivor Series Showdown |

Saturday Night's Main Event XXXI took place October 27, 1992, from Terre Haute, Indiana, at the Hulman Center, and aired November 14, 1992. The event aired on Fox and drew a 6.1 rating and 10.6 million viewers. This event was the second and final Saturday Night's Main Event to air on Fox, and the final Saturday Night's Main Event for almost 14 years, until the series returned in 2006 with Saturday Night's Main Event XXXII.

| No. | Results | Stipulations | Times |
|---|---|---|---|
| 1 | The Ultimate Maniacs (Ultimate Warrior and Randy Savage) defeated Money Inc. (Ted DiBiase and Irwin R. Schyster) (c) (with Jimmy Hart) by countout | Tag team match for the WWF Tag Team Championship | 6:11 |
| 2 | Shawn Michaels defeated The British Bulldog (c) by pinfall | Singles match for the WWF Intercontinental Championship | 10:28 |
| 3 | Bret Hart (c) defeated Papa Shango by submission | Singles match for the WWF Championship | 7:13 |
(c) / – the champion(s) heading into the match

=== 2000s ===
==== Saturday Night's Main Event XXXII ====
Saturday Night's Main Event XXXII
- Promotion: World Wrestling Entertainment
- Brand(s): Raw; SmackDown!
- Date: March 18, 2006
- City: Detroit, Michigan
- Venue: Cobo Arena
- Attendance: 7,000

Saturday Night's Main Event chronology
| ← Previous; XXXI | Next → XXXIII |

Saturday Night's Main Event XXXII took place on March 18, 2006, from Detroit, Michigan, at the Cobo Arena. The event aired on a 1-hour tape delay on NBC in the United States, drawing a 3.1 rating. This marked the first Saturday Night's Main Event since 1992 when Saturday Night's Main Event XXXI aired on Fox, and the first on NBC since Saturday Night's Main Event XXIX in 1991 as well as the first Saturday Night's Main Event to feature wrestlers from the Raw and SmackDown! brand divisions during the first brand extension.

Mickie James and Trish Stratus fought over the WWE Women's Championship at New Year's Revolution, with Stratus retaining. In the months that followed, James' obsession with Stratus grew to the point that she confessed to Stratus that she was in love with her. James made an attempt to kiss Stratus at Saturday Night's Main Event XXXII, after the duo defeated Candice Michelle and Victoria. After she was rebuffed, James attacked Stratus and later vowed to destroy her.

Jim Ross, Jerry Lawler, and Tazz were the commentators.

| No. | Results | Stipulations | Times |
|---|---|---|---|
| 1^{D} | Big Show defeated Carlito | Singles match | — |
| 2 | John Cena and Triple H defeated Kurt Angle, Rey Mysterio, and Randy Orton | Handicap match | 11:40 |
| 3 | Mickie James and Trish Stratus defeated Candice Michelle and Victoria | Tag team match | 2:40 |
| 4 | Shane McMahon defeated Shawn Michaels by submission | Street Fight | 16:42 |
D / – this was a dark match

==== Saturday Night's Main Event XXXIII ====
Saturday Night's Main Event XXXIII
- Promotion: World Wrestling Entertainment
- Brand(s): Raw; SmackDown! ECW
- Date: July 15, 2006
- City: Dallas, Texas
- Venue: American Airlines Center
- Attendance: 17,343

Saturday Night's Main Event chronology
| ← Previous; XXXII | Next → XXXIV |

Saturday Night's Main Event XXXIII took place July 15, 2006, from Dallas, Texas, at the American Airlines Center. The event drew 17,343 people, of which 14,500 were paid. The event aired live on NBC, and drew a 2.6 rating. This was the first series to feature the ECW brand, which was relaunched in June 2006.

Jim Ross and Jerry Lawler were the commentators for Raw, Michael Cole and John "Bradshaw" Layfield were the commentators for SmackDown, and Joey Styles and Tazz were the commentators for ECW. Justin Roberts was the ring announcer.

| No. | Results | Stipulations | Times |
|---|---|---|---|
| 1 | Batista, Rey Mysterio, and Bobby Lashley defeated Mark Henry, Finlay, and King Booker (with Queen Sharmell and William Regal) | Six-man tag team match | 10:07 |
| 2 | Carlito and Trish Stratus defeated Johnny Nitro and Melina | Mixed tag team match | 2:36 |
| 3 | D-Generation X (Triple H and Shawn Michaels) defeated The Spirit Squad (Kenny, Mitch, Nicky, Johnny, and Mikey) | Handicap Elimination match | 8:52 |
| 4 | Michelle McCool defeated Victoria | Diva Bull-Riding Contest | 1:08 |
| 5 | Sabu defeated Stevie Richards | Extreme Rules match | 2:02 |
| 6 | John Cena defeated Edge (c) (with Lita) by disqualification | Singles match for the WWE Championship | 7:54 |
(c) / – the champion(s) heading into the match

==== Saturday Night's Main Event XXXIV ====
Saturday Night's Main Event XXXIV
- Promotion: World Wrestling Entertainment
- Brand(s): Raw; SmackDown! ECW
- Date: May 28, 2007 (aired June 2, 2007)
- City: Toronto, Ontario, Canada
- Venue: Air Canada Centre
- Attendance: 16,176

Saturday Night's Main Event chronology
| ← Previous; XXXIII | Next → XXXV |

Saturday Night's Main Event XXXIV took place on May 28, 2007, from Toronto, Ontario, Canada at the Air Canada Centre, and aired June 2, 2007. The event drew 16,176 of which 14,000 were paid. The event aired on NBC and drew a 2.2 rating.

Michael Cole and Jerry Lawler were the commentators. Ashley Massaro, Kristal Marshall, Torrie Wilson, Candice Michelle, and Michelle McCool were the various guest ring announcers.

| No. | Results | Stipulations | Times |
|---|---|---|---|
| 1^{D} | Chuck Palumbo defeated Tyson Dux by pinfall | Singles match | — |
| 2 | The Great Khali (with Ranjin Singh) defeated John Cena by pinfall | Singles match | 6:20 |
| 3 | Batista and Chris Benoit defeated Edge and Montel Vontavious Porter by pinfall | Tag team match | 10:37 |
| 4 | Finlay and Hornswoggle defeated The Boogeyman and Little Boogeyman by pinfall | Tag team match | 3:49 |
| 5 | Kane, Doink the Clown, and Eugene defeated Kevin Thorn, Viscera, and Umaga by pinfall | Six-man tag team match | 10:55 |
D / – this was a dark match

==== Saturday Night's Main Event XXXV ====
Saturday Night's Main Event XXXV
- Promotion: World Wrestling Entertainment
- Brand(s): Raw; SmackDown! ECW
- Date: August 13, 2007 (aired August 18, 2007)
- City: New York City, New York
- Venue: Madison Square Garden
- Attendance: 16,827

Saturday Night's Main Event chronology
| ← Previous; XXXIV | Next → XXXVI |

Saturday Night's Main Event XXXV took place on August 13, 2007, from New York City, New York at Madison Square Garden, and aired August 18, 2007. The event drew 16,827 of which 13,500 were paid. The event aired on NBC and drew a 2.5 rating.

Michael Cole, Jim Ross, and John "Bradshaw" Layfield were the commentators. Tazz was the guest commentator for the main event.

| No. | Results | Stipulations | Times |
|---|---|---|---|
| 1 | Batista and Kane defeated Finlay and The Great Khali (with Ranjin Singh) | Tag team match | 8:25 |
| 2 | John Cena defeated Carlito by submission | Singles match | 5:37 |
| 3 | Evander Holyfield vs. Matt Hardy ended in a no contest | Boxing match | 2:44 |
| 4 | CM Punk and The Boogeyman defeated John Morrison and Big Daddy V (with Matt Striker) | Tag team match | 6:40 |

==== Saturday Night's Main Event XXXVI ====
Saturday Night's Main Event XXXVI
- Promotion: World Wrestling Entertainment
- Brand(s): Raw; SmackDown! ECW
- Date: July 28, 2008 (aired August 2, 2008)
- City: Washington, D.C.
- Venue: Verizon Center
- Attendance: 14,722

Saturday Night's Main Event chronology
| ← Previous; XXXV | Next → XXXVII |

Saturday Night's Main Event XXXVI took place on July 28, 2008, from Washington, D.C., at the Verizon Center, and aired August 2, 2008. The event aired on NBC as a 1-hour special, and drew a 1.4 rating. The event drew 14,722 of which 12,000 were paid.

Jim Ross and Jerry Lawler were the commentators. CM Punk was the guest commentator for the first televised match.

| No. | Results | Stipulations | Times |
|---|---|---|---|
| 1^{D} | Paul London defeated Charlie Haas by pinfall | Singles match | 6:00 |
| 2 | John "Bradshaw" Layfield, Kane, and The Legacy (Cody Rhodes and Ted DiBiase) defeated John Cena, Batista, and Cryme Tyme (Shad Gaspard and JTG) by pinfall | Eight-man tag team match | 11:00 |
| 3 | The Great Khali (with Ranjin Singh) defeated Jimmy Wang Yang by pinfall | Singles match | 1:30 |
| 4 | Edge defeated Jeff Hardy by pinfall | Singles match | 12:00 |
D / – this was a dark match

=== 2020s ===
==== Saturday Night's Main Event XXXVII ====
Saturday Night's Main Event XXXVII took place on December 14, 2024, from Uniondale, New York, at the Nassau Veterans Memorial Coliseum, the same location as the inaugural event 39 years earlier. The event was broadcast in the United States on NBC and streaming on Peacock and on YouTube in international markets as a two-hour special, marking the first Saturday Night's Main Event special since 2008. This special saw the crowning of the inaugural WWE Women's United States Champion.

==== Saturday Night's Main Event XXXVIII ====
Saturday Night's Main Event XXXVIII
- Promotional poster featuring Jey Uso
- Promotion: WWE
- Brand(s): Raw; SmackDown
- Date: January 25, 2025
- City: San Antonio, Texas
- Venue: Frost Bank Center
- Attendance: 15,575

WWE event chronology
| ← Previous; Saturday Night's Main Event XXXVII | Next → Royal Rumble |

Saturday Night's Main Event chronology
| ← Previous; XXXVII | Next → XXXIX |

Saturday Night's Main Event XXXVIII took place on January 25, 2025, from San Antonio, Texas, at the Frost Bank Center, and was broadcast on NBC and Peacock in the United States and on YouTube in most other international markets. The event featured the contract signing (moderated by WWE Hall of Famer and San Antonio native Shawn Michaels) between Cody Rhodes and Kevin Owens for their upcoming Ladder match for Rhodes' Undisputed WWE Championship and the "Winged Eagle" WWE Championship (which Owens stole from Rhodes at the previous Saturday Night's Main Event) at the Royal Rumble event. WWE Hall of Famer Jesse "The Body" Ventura returned to provide commentary for the event.

| No. | Results | Stipulations | Times |
|---|---|---|---|
| 1^{D} | LA Knight defeated Carmelo Hayes by pinfall | Singles match | 5:06 |
| 2 | Rhea Ripley (c) defeated Nia Jax by pinfall | Singles match for the Women's World Championship | 9:25 |
| 3 | Bron Breakker (c) defeated Sheamus by pinfall | Singles match for the WWE Intercontinental Championship | 11:30 |
| 4 | Braun Strowman defeated Jacob Fatu by disqualification | Singles match | 9:00 |
| 5 | Gunther (c) defeated Jey Uso by pinfall | Singles match for the World Heavyweight Championship | 16:40 |
(c) / – the champion(s) heading into the match; D / – this was a dark match

==== Saturday Night's Main Event XXXIX ====
Saturday Night's Main Event XXXIX
- Promotional poster featuring John Cena
- Promotion: WWE
- Brand(s): Raw; SmackDown
- Date: May 24, 2025
- City: Tampa, Florida
- Venue: Yuengling Center
- Attendance: 10,762

WWE event chronology
| ← Previous; Backlash | Next → NXT Battleground |

Saturday Night's Main Event chronology
| ← Previous; XXXVIII | Next → XL |

Saturday Night's Main Event XXXIX took place on May 24, 2025, from Tampa, Florida, at the Yuengling Center, and broadcast on NBC and Peacock in the United States and on YouTube in most other international markets. The event featured the return of Cody Rhodes in his first appearance since Night 2 of WrestleMania 41 in April, as well as Bronson Reed who had been out with a broken ankle since Survivor Series: WarGames in November 2024 and joined Seth Rollins, Bron Breakker, and Paul Heyman's alliance (later dubbed The Vision). WWE Hall of Famer Jesse "The Body" Ventura returned to provide commentary for the event.

| No. | Results | Stipulations | Times |
|---|---|---|---|
| 1^{D} | The Creed Brothers (Brutus Creed and Julius Creed) defeated Latino World Order (Cruz Del Toro and Joaquin Wilde) | Tag team match | 7:37 |
| 2 | Seth Rollins and Bron Breakker (with Paul Heyman) defeated CM Punk and Sami Zayn by pinfall | Tag team match | 13:10 |
| 3 | Zelina Vega (c) defeated Chelsea Green (with Alba Fyre and Piper Niven) by pinfall | Singles match for the WWE Women's United States Championship | 5:10 |
| 4 | John Cena defeated R-Truth by pinfall | Singles match | 4:25 |
| 5 | Damian Priest defeated Drew McIntyre by escaping the cage | Steel Cage match | 11:50 |
| 6 | Jey Uso (c) defeated Logan Paul by pinfall | Singles match for the World Heavyweight Championship | 9:45 |
(c) / – the champion(s) heading into the match; D / – this was a dark match

==== Saturday Night's Main Event XL ====
Saturday Night's Main Event XL
- Promotional poster featuring Goldberg
- Promotion: WWE
- Brand(s): Raw; SmackDown
- Date: July 12, 2025
- City: Atlanta, Georgia
- Venue: State Farm Arena
- Attendance: 17,731
- Tagline: No One Spared. Everyone Speared.

WWE event chronology
| ← Previous; NXT The Great American Bash | Next → Evolution |

Saturday Night's Main Event chronology
| ← Previous; XXXIX | Next → XLI |

Saturday Night's Main Event XL took place on July 12, 2025, from Atlanta, Georgia, at the State Farm Arena and was broadcast on NBC and Peacock in the United States and on YouTube in most other international markets. This event featured the first in-ring match for Goldberg since 2022, which was also his final match in his 28-year wrestling career.

| No. | Results | Stipulations | Times |
|---|---|---|---|
| 1^{D} | B-Fab and Michin defeated The Secret Hervice (Alba Fyre and Piper Niven) (with Chelsea Green) by pinfall | Tag team match | — |
| 2 | Randy Orton (with Jelly Roll) defeated Drew McIntyre (with Logan Paul) by pinfall | Singles match | 8:26 |
| 3 | Solo Sikoa (c) (with JC Mateo, Talla Tonga, and Tonga Loa) defeated Jimmy Uso by pinfall | Singles match for the WWE United States Championship | 10:49 |
| 4 | LA Knight defeated Seth Rollins (with Paul Heyman) by pinfall | Singles match | 11:38 |
| 5 | Gunther (c) defeated Goldberg by technical submission | Singles match for the World Heavyweight Championship; This was Goldberg's retirement match. | 15:20 |
(c) / – the champion(s) heading into the match; D / – this was a dark match

==== Saturday Night's Main Event XLI ====
Saturday Night's Main Event XLI
- Promotional poster featuring CM Punk
- Promotion: WWE
- Brand(s): Raw; SmackDown
- Date: November 1, 2025
- City: Salt Lake City, Utah
- Venue: Delta Center

WWE event chronology
| ← Previous; NXT Halloween Havoc | Next → Survivor Series: WarGames |

Saturday Night's Main Event chronology
| ← Previous; XL | Next → XLII |

Saturday Night's Main Event XLI took place on November 1, 2025, from Salt Lake City, Utah at Delta Center and was broadcast on Peacock in the United States, on YouTube in most other international markets, and on Sony Sports Network in India on November 2, 2025.

| No. | Results | Stipulations | Times |
|---|---|---|---|
| 1^{D} | Bayley defeated Raquel Rodriguez | Singles match | — |
| 2 | Cody Rhodes (c) defeated Drew McIntyre by pinfall | Singles match for the Undisputed WWE Championship; Had Rhodes gotten disqualified or counted out, he would have lost the title. | 18:45 |
| 3 | Jade Cargill defeated Tiffany Stratton (c) by pinfall | Singles match for the WWE Women's Championship | 5:30 |
| 4 | Dominik Mysterio (c) defeated Penta and Rusev by pinfall | Triple threat match for the WWE Intercontinental Championship | 12:30 |
| 5 | CM Punk defeated Jey Uso by pinfall | Singles match for the vacant World Heavyweight Championship | 21:00 |
(c) / – the champion(s) heading into the match; D / – this was a dark match

==== Saturday Night's Main Event XLII ====
Saturday Night's Main Event XLII, also promoted as Saturday Night's Main Event: John Cena's Final Match, took place on December 13, 2025, at Capital One Arena in Washington, D.C.. It was broadcast on Peacock in the United States and on YouTube in most other international markets. The event featured John Cena's final match in his 26-year wrestling career. His final opponent was Gunther, who won The Last Time Is Now Tournament for the right to face Cena at the event. The show also featured matches pitting NXT wrestlers against main roster wrestlers.

==== Saturday Night's Main Event XLIII ====
Saturday Night's Main Event XLIII
- Promotional poster featuring Randy Orton, Damian Priest, Sami Zayn, and Trick Williams
- Promotion: WWE
- Brand(s): Raw; SmackDown
- Date: January 24, 2026
- City: Montreal, Quebec, Canada
- Venue: Bell Centre
- Attendance: 12,891

WWE event chronology
| ← Previous; Saturday Night's Main Event XLII | Next → Royal Rumble |

Saturday Night's Main Event chronology
| ← Previous; XLII | Next → XLIV |

Saturday Night's Main Event XLIII took place on January 24, 2026, from Montreal, Quebec, Canada at the Bell Centre, and was broadcast on Peacock in the United States and on YouTube in most other international markets. It was the first Saturday Night's Main Event in Canada since XXXIV in Toronto in 2007. A match between Cody Rhodes and Jacob Fatu was scheduled to open the night; however, it did not take place due to a brawl between both men occurring before it could begin.

| No. | Results | Stipulations | Times |
|---|---|---|---|
| 1 | Rhiyo (Rhea Ripley and Iyo Sky) (c) defeated The Judgment Day (Liv Morgan and Roxanne Perez) by pinfall | Tag team match for the WWE Women's Tag Team Championship | 13:25 |
| 2 | AJ Styles defeated Shinsuke Nakamura by pinfall | Singles match | 21:20 |
| 3 | Sami Zayn defeated Damian Priest, Randy Orton, and Trick Williams by pinfall | Fatal four-way match to determine the #1 contender for the Undisputed WWE Championship at the Royal Rumble | 17:00 |
(c) / – the champion(s) heading into the match

===== WWE Championship #1 Contender's Tournament =====
Qualifiers; SmackDown; January 16, 2026
Randy Orton | Pinfall
The Miz | 4:30
Matt Cardona | 8:50
Trick Williams | Pinfall
Damian Priest | Pinfall
Solo Sikoa | 9:45
Sami Zayn | Pinfall
Ilja Dragunov | 12:30

Final; Saturday Night's Main Event; January 24, 2026
Randy Orton | —
Trick Williams | —
Damian Priest | 17:00
Sami Zayn | Pinfall

==== Saturday Night's Main Event XLIV ====
Saturday Night's Main Event XLIV
- Promotional poster featuring Penta
- Promotion: WWE
- Brand(s): Raw; SmackDown
- Date: May 23, 2026
- City: Fort Wayne, Indiana
- Venue: Allen County War Memorial Coliseum
- Attendance: 10,714

WWE event chronology
| ← Previous; Backlash | Next → Clash in Italy |

Saturday Night's Main Event chronology
| ← Previous; XLIII | Next → XLV |

Saturday Night's Main Event XLIV took place on May 23, 2026, from Fort Wayne, Indiana at Allen County War Memorial Coliseum and broadcast on Peacock in the United States and on YouTube in most other international markets. It was the first WWE televised event in Fort Wayne since 2014.

| No. | Results | Stipulations | Times |
|---|---|---|---|
| 1 | Jade Cargill, Michin, and B-Fab defeated Rhea Ripley, Charlotte Flair, and Alexa Bliss by pinfall | Six-woman tag team match | 16:48 |
| 2 | Sol Ruca defeated Becky Lynch by disqualification | Singles match | 2:26 |
| 3 | Penta (c) defeated Ethan Page by pinfall | Singles match for the WWE Intercontinental Championship | 14:22 |
| 4 | Paige and Brie Bella (c) defeated The Irresistible Forces (Lash Legend and Nia Jax) by pinfall | Tag team match for the WWE Women's Tag Team Championship | 8:24 |
| 5 | The Vision (Logan Paul and Austin Theory) (c) (with Paul Heyman) defeated The Street Profits (Angelo Dawkins and Montez Ford) by pinfall | Tag team match for the World Tag Team Championship | 16:29 |
(c) / – the champion(s) heading into the match

==== Saturday Night's Main Event XLV ====
Saturday Night's Main Event XLV, also promoted as Saturday Night's Main Event: NYC and Saturday Night's Main Event at MSG, took place on July 18, 2026 at Madison Square Garden in New York City, New York, and broadcast on Peacock in the United States and on YouTube in most other international markets. This was the first Saturday Night's Main Event at the Garden since August 2007 and was part of Fanatics Fest. Indiana Pacers' Tyrese Haliburton and 2026 NBA Champions New York Knicks' Jalen Brunson and Karl-Anthony Towns made appearances at the event, with Towns becoming physically involved in Danhausen's No disqualification match against JD McDonagh.

==== Sunday Night's Main Event ====
Sunday Night's Main Event took place on Sunday, September 6, 2026, from Atlanta, Georgia at State Farm Arena, and broadcast on Peacock in the United States and on YouTube in most other international markets. This was the first edition of the event to be held on a Sunday during the Labor Day weekend. The event date slot was originally scheduled for Money in the Bank in New Orleans, Louisiana, but on June 8, 2026, WWE revealed that Money in the Bank would instead take place a month later on Saturday, October 10, at the same venue. The event featured the in-ring debut of Lil Yachty and the return of Bronson Reed. The event also featured a performance by Quavo of "Backwards" off his third studio album Qrömelife.

== Home video ==
=== VHS release ===
During the original run, Coliseum Video released two cassettes of Saturday Night's Main Event: Saturday Night's Main Event's Greatest Hits which contained six matches from 1985 to 1987 and More Saturday Night's Main Event containing nine matches from 1988 to 1989.

In 1992, the WWF released through Columbia House, Best of Saturday Night's Main Event (Collector's Edition) comprising five matches from 1988 to 1990.

=== DVD release ===
On February 10, 2009, the WWE released a three-disc DVD set on the history of Saturday Night's Main Event. The set includes more than 30 full matches and several non-wrestling segments. Among these are highlights of Uncle Elmer's wedding, Hulk Hogan's "Real American" music video, and Mr. Perfect smashing Hogan's WWF World Heavyweight Championship belt. The first match in the program's history, a six-man tag team match pitting the U.S. Express (Mike Rotundo and Barry Windham) teaming with Ricky Steamboat defeating the team of WWF Tag Team Champions Nikolai Volkoff and The Iron Sheik and their partner George "The Animal" Steele, is included as an extra. Also, two other notable matches are included, both from the program's spinoff The Main Event. The first is a February 1988 rematch from WrestleMania III pitting Hogan against André the Giant, the second a Mega Powers' (Hogan and Randy Savage) bout against the Twin Towers (Big Boss Man and Akeem) from February 1989. Both had direct implications on each year's WrestleMania: the Hogan-Andre match led to the WWF title being vacated until WrestleMania IV while the Mega Powers-Twin Towers match led to the breakup of the Mega Powers and Hogan eventually defeating Randy Savage to win the WWF title at WrestleMania V.

In the WrestleMania 22 DVD, the XXXII edition was included in the 2nd disc in its entirety.
