= Timeline of the history of the United States (1970–1989) =

This section of the timeline of United States history concerns events from 1970 to 1989

== 1970s ==
The Watergate scandal causes Nixon to be the first U.S. president to resign from office.

=== Presidency of Richard M. Nixon ===
- 1970 – The first Earth Day is observed.
- 1970 – Kent State and Jackson State shootings occur during student protests which grew violent. National Guard troops and police kill six students, wound others.
- 1970 – American Top 40, hosted by radio personality Casey Kasem, becomes the first successful nationally syndicated radio program featuring a weekly countdown.
- 1970 – The Public Broadcasting System (PBS) begins operations, succeeding National Educational Television (NET).
- 1970 – Singer-songwriter-guitarist-musician Jimi Hendrix dies of a drug overdose at the age 27.
- 1970 – Singer Janis Joplin dies of a drug overdose at the age of 27.
- 1970 – The Environmental Protection Agency is created.
- 1970 – The Occupational Safety and Health Act, or OSHA, is signed into law.
- 1971 – Singer Jim Morrison dies of a drug overdose at the age of 27.
- 1971 – President Richard Nixon ends the United States Gold standard monetary policy, known as the Nixon Shock
- 1971 – A ban on radio and television cigarette advertisements goes into effect in the United States
- 1971 – The landmark situation comedy, All in the Family, premieres on CBS.
- 1971 – The 26th Amendment is ratified, allowing 18-year-olds to vote.
- 1971 – In New York Times Co. v. United States, the Supreme Court rules that the Pentagon Papers may be published, rejecting government injunctions as unconstitutional prior restraint.
- 1972 – President Richard Nixon visits Mao Zedong in China, an astonishing step in formally normalizing relations between the United States and China.
- 1972 – The Anti-Ballistic Missile Treaty is signed with the USSR.
- 1972 – First African-American major league baseball player Jackie Robinson dies.
- 1972 – Watergate scandal: Five men arrested for the burglary of the Democratic National Committee headquarters at the Watergate office complex in Washington, D.C.
- 1972 – 1972 United States presidential election: Richard M. Nixon re-elected president, Spiro T. Agnew re-elected vice president
- 1972 – Apollo 17 flies and lands to the Moon, and becomes the last crewed mission there (as of May 2025)(Artemis III will launch in mid-2027 with the next crewed landing on the Moon).
- January 20, 1973 – President Nixon and Vice President Agnew begin second terms.
- 1973 – Former president Lyndon B. Johnson dies in Stonewall, Texas, of his third and final heart attack. It was at the LBJ ranch.
- 1973 – State funeral of President Lyndon Johnson
- 1973 – Roe v. Wade Supreme Court ruling overturns state laws against abortion.
- 1973 – The Paris Peace Accords ends direct U.S. involvement in the Vietnam War.
- 1973 – The Senate Watergate hearings begin, highlighted by Fred Thompson's discovery of Nixon's secret tapes.
- 1973 – Skylab is launched as the USA's first space station.
- October 10, 1973 – Vice President Agnew resigns in disgrace as part of a plea bargain.
- December 6, 1973 – Gerald R. Ford becomes the first person to be appointed vice president under the 25th Amendment to the Constitution.
- 1973 – Watergate scandal: President Nixon fires two attorneys general, and their appointed acting attorney general replacement fires the Watergate Special Prosecutor over disposition of the secret tapes.
- 1973–1974 — The United States is affected by the Arab Oil Embargo; gasoline prices skyrocket as supplies of gasoline and heating oil are in short supply. In response, daylight saving time is started in January (nearly four months earlier than usual), and the national speed limit is lowered to 55 mph.
- 1974 – The 1974 Super Outbreak, the second-largest series of tornadoes in history (at 148), hits 13 U.S. states and one Canadian province; 315 people are killed and more than 5,000 are injured.
- 1974 – Hank Aaron of the Atlanta Braves breaks Babe Ruth's home run record by hitting his 715th career home run.
- 1974 – Watergate scandal: The House Judiciary Committee votes to impeach President Nixon
- 1974 – "Sweet Home Alabama" released by Lynyrd Skynyrd.

=== Presidency of Gerald R. Ford ===
- August 9, 1974 – President Nixon resigns, becoming the first and only U.S. president to step down. Vice President Ford becomes the 38th president.
- December 19, 1974 – Nelson A. Rockefeller becomes the second person to be appointed vice president under the 25th Amendment to the Constitution.
- 1974 – Watergate scandal: Ford pardons Nixon for any crimes he may have committed against the United States while president, believing it to be in the "best interests of the country."
- 1974 – Restrictions are removed on holding private gold within the United States.
- 1975 – President Ford signs The Helsinki Accords.
- 1975 – The movie Jaws is released. It is a landmark in Steven Spielberg's movie career.
- 1975 – Construction of the Trans-Alaska Pipeline System begins.
- 1975 – The Vietnam War ends.
- 1975 – Fall of Saigon
- 1975 – Bill Gates founds Microsoft, which will eventually dominate the home computer operating system market.
- 1975 – The Apollo–Soyuz Test Project begins, where an American Apollo spacecraft and a Soviet Soyuz spacecraft dock in orbit, marking the first such link-up between spacecraft from the two nations.
- 1975 – President Ford survives two assassination attempts in a 17-day span (in Sacramento and in San Francisco).
- 1975 – The television series Wheel of Fortune and Saturday Night Live premiere on NBC.
- 1975 – Sony's Betamax becomes the first commercially successful home video recording unit.
- 1976 – The Copyright Act of 1976 makes sweeping changes to United States copyright law.
- 1976 – Steve Jobs, Steve Wozniak, and Ronald Wayne found Apple Inc.
- 1976 – Americans celebrate the Bicentennial of the United States.
- 1976 – 1976 United States presidential election: Jimmy Carter is elected president, Walter Mondale is elected vice president.

=== Presidency of Jimmy Carter ===
- January 20, 1977 – Carter becomes the 39th president, Mondale becomes the 42nd vice president
- 1977 – The first home personal computer, the Commodore PET, is released for retail sale.
- 1977 – The television miniseries Roots airs on ABC, to critical acclaim and record audiences.
- 1977 – The science-fiction space opera film Star Wars debuts in theaters.
- 1977 – The New York City blackout of 1977 lasts for 25 hours, resulting in looting and other disorder.
- 1977 – Elvis Presley, the king of rock and roll, dies in his home in Graceland at age 42. 75,000 fans line the streets of Memphis for his funeral
- 1977 – The Atari 2600 becomes the first successful home video game system, popularizing the use of microprocessor-based hardware and cartridges containing game code.
- 1977 – The International Women’s Year Conference (IWY), is held in Houston, Texas, where 2,000 state-appointed delegates vote on planks to form a “Plan of Action” called “What Women Want.”
- 1978 – Volkswagen becomes the second non-American automobile manufacturer (after Rolls-Royce) to open a plant in the United States, commencing production of the Rabbit.
- 1978 – The Camp David Accords commence, where Prime Minister Menachem Begin (Israel) and President Anwar Sadat (Egypt) begin the peace process at Camp David, Maryland.
- 1978 – The Humphrey Hawkins Full Employment Act is signed into law, adjusting the government's economic goals to include full employment, growth in production, price stability, and a balance of trade and budget.
- 1978 – The Senate votes to turn the Panama Canal over to Panamanian control on December 31, 1999.
- 1978 – Supervisor Harvey Milk and Mayor George Moscone are assassinated by Dan White in San Francisco on November 27.
- 1979 – The Three Mile Island nuclear accident occurs, America's most catastrophic nuclear power plant accident in its history.
- 1979 – The Iran hostage crisis begins. In the aftermath, a second energy crisis develops, tripling the price of oil and sending U. S. gasoline prices over $1 per gallon for the first time.
- 1979 – American Airlines Flight 191 crashes after takeoff from O'Hare International Airport, killing all 271 aboard and two on the ground, making it one of the deadliest aviation incidents on U.S. soil.
- 1979 — Facing bankruptcy, Chrysler receives government loan guarantees upon the request of CEO Lee Iacocca to help revive the company.
- 1979 – The Sugarhill Gang releases Rapper's Delight, widely considered the first major hip hop song. The hip hop music movement occurred in the Early 1970s, but would evolve over time.

== 1980s ==
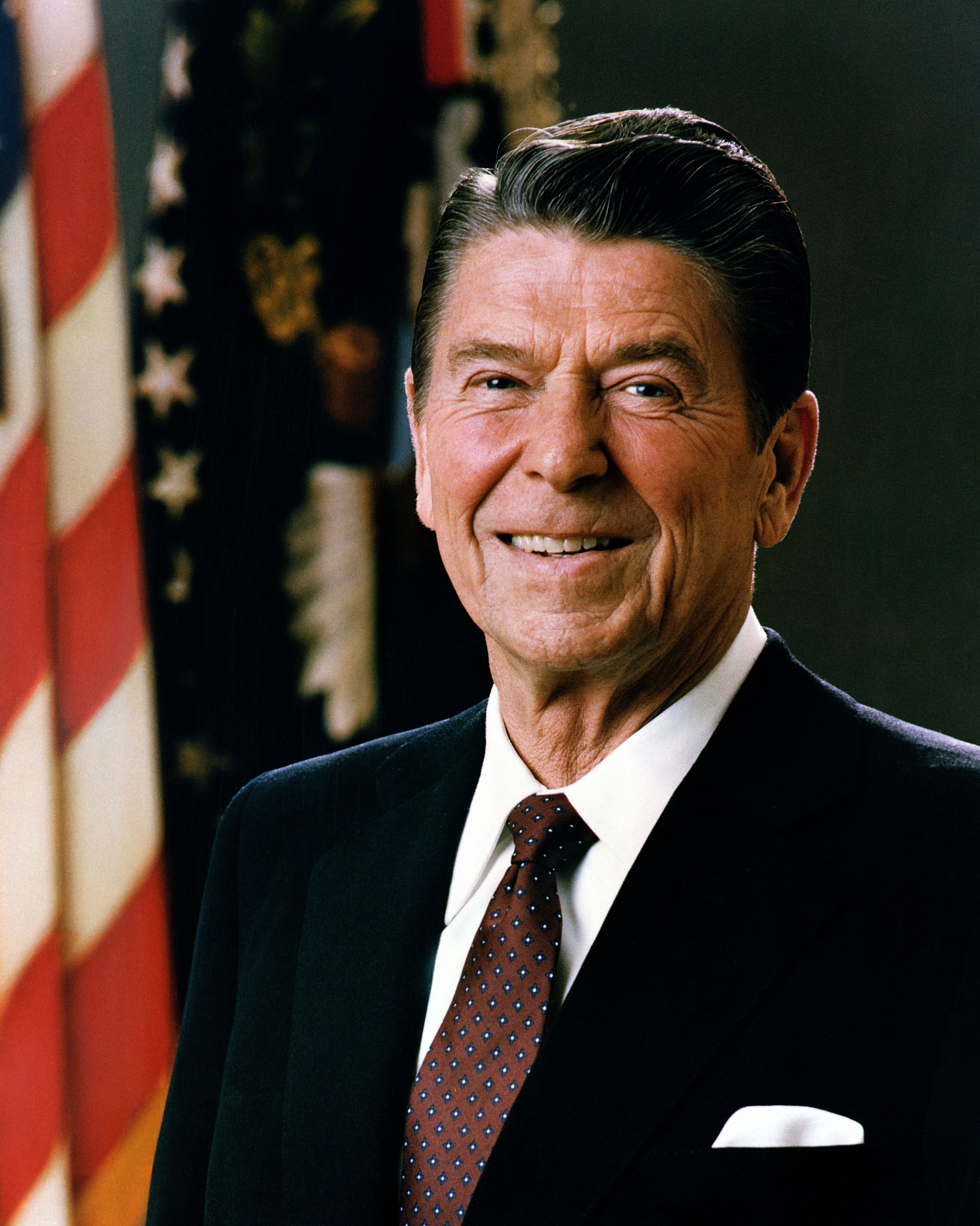
President Ronald Reagan was the face of the United States during the 1980s.

- 1980 – The United States boycotts the Summer Olympics in Moscow to protest the 1979 Soviet invasion of Afghanistan; also announces a grain embargo against the Soviet Union with the support of the European Commission.
- 1980 – The Refugee Act of 1980 is signed into law, reforming United States immigration law and admitted refugees on systematic basis for humanitarian reasons
- 1980 – The Mount St. Helens eruption in Washington on May 18 kills 57.
- 1980 – 1980 United States presidential election: Ronald Reagan is elected president, with George H. W. Bush elected vice president
- 1980 – Former Beatle John Lennon is murdered by a gunman on December 8 in New York City.

=== Presidency of Ronald W. Reagan ===
- January 20, 1981 – Reagan becomes the 40th president; Bush becomes the 43rd vice president. On the same day Iran releases hostages, marking the end of the Iran hostage crisis.
- March 30, 1981 – Attempted assassination of President Reagan by John Hinckley Jr.
- 1981 – 1982 - United States is part of the global recession, with national unemployment as high as 9%, with some areas much higher, and inflation as high as 13.5%. Early 1980s recession
- 1981 – Kemp-Roth Tax Cut
- 1981 – MTV signs on, becoming the first 24-hour cable network dedicated to airing music videos.
- 1981 – A hotel walkway collapses in Kansas City, Missouri, killing 114 and injuring over 200; it was the deadliest structural collapse to occur in the United States until 9/11.
- 1981 – The Space Shuttle Columbia is launched, marking America's first return to space since 1975.
- 1981 – Sandra Day O'Connor becomes the first woman on the U.S. Supreme Court.
- 1981 - In August, President Reagan fires 11,345 striking air traffic controllers. Professional Air Traffic Controllers Organization (1968)
- 1981–1982 — The killing of 6-year-old Adam Walsh (1981), and the disappearance of Johnny Gosch, a 12-year-old newspaper carrier from Des Moines, Iowa (1982), raise awareness of missing children cases in the United States.
- 1983 – 241 U.S. Marines are killed by a suicide bomb in Lebanon.
- 1983 – The United States invades Grenada.
- 1983 — Singer Karen Carpenter dies from complications of anorexia nervosa, raising awareness of eating disorders.
- 1983 – Chrysler unveils its minivans — the Dodge Caravan and Plymouth Voyager (as 1984 models) — to the public.
- 1983 - The Reagan Administration creates the Strategic Defense Initiative, nicknamed Star Wars, to block nuclear missile attacks.
- 1984 – Most of the Eastern Bloc boycotts the Summer Olympics in Los Angeles.
- 1984 – 1984 United States presidential election: Ronald Reagan is re-elected president, with George H. W. Bush re-elected as vice president.
- 1984 – The drug problem intensifies as crack (a smokable form of cocaine) is first introduced into the Los Angeles area.
- 1984 – Awareness of child sexual abuse by pedophiles raised through high-profile media coverage on programs such as 60 Minutes and 20/20.
- January 20, 1985 – President Reagan and Vice President Bush begin their second terms.
- 1985 – Bernhard Goetz is indicted in New York on charges of attempted murder after shooting four young men who he claimed were intent on mugging him.
- 1985 – Professional wrestling hits the mainstream with the World Wrestling Federation's WrestleMania I and Saturday Night's Main Event I. The WWF's flagship star, Hulk Hogan, becomes a cultural icon.
- 1985 – World awareness of famine in Third World countries spark "We Are the World" and Live Aid. Also, awareness of AIDS (acquired immune deficiency syndrome) is raised with the death of actor Rock Hudson.
- 1985 – Country music singer Willie Nelson and John Mellencamp organize the first Farm Aid concert to raise money for family farmers facing financial crisis.
- 1985 – The Ford Taurus and Mercury Sable (as 1986 models), and the Nintendo Entertainment System are released to the public.
- 1985 – Gramm Rudman Hollings Balanced Budget Act
- 1986 – Iran–Contra affair breaks
- 1986 – The Space Shuttle Challenger explodes 73 seconds after liftoff, killing all seven aboard (including school teacher Christa McAuliffe) and grounding the nation's space program for 2 1/2 years.
- 1986 – The Firearm Owners Protection Act is signed into law by President Reagan.
- 1986 – Tax Reform Act of 1986
- 1986 – The Marshall Islands become independent from the United States.
- 1986 – The Fox Broadcasting Company launched, becoming the first "fourth major network" since DuMont to offer nightly programming.
- 1987 – Assorted scandals involve popular televangelists, including Jim Bakker, Oral Roberts, and Jimmy Swaggart.
- 1987 – During a visit to Berlin, Germany, President Reagan challenges Soviet General Secretary Mikhail Gorbachev to "Tear down this wall!" (referring to the Berlin Wall).
- 1987 – The Dow Jones Industrial Average falls 22.6% in a single session on Black Monday.
- November 22, 1987 – An unidentified man wearing the Max Headroom mask appears out of nowhere on television stations WGN-TV and WTTW in Chicago. It is to this day the most notorious television broadcast interruption. As of 2026, the mystery is still unsolved, However, many people on Reddit claim they were behind the crime.
- 1987 – Dennis Conner, on board the challenger boat Stars & Stripes, returns the America's Cup to America.
- 1987 – The Intermediate-Range Nuclear Forces Treaty is signed in Washington, D.C. by President Reagan and Soviet Premier Gorbachev.
- 1988 – Drunk driving awareness is raised after a drunk driver's car crashes into a church bus near Carrollton, Kentucky, killing 27.
- 1988 – Severe droughts and massive heat wave gripping the Midwest and Rocky Mountain states. The crisis reaches its peak with the Yellowstone fires of 1988.
- 1988 – Wrigley Field in Chicago, Illinois, becomes the last Major League Baseball park to add lights for night games.
- 1988 – Discovery is launched as first post-Challenger Space Shuttle flight.
- 1988 – 1988 United States presidential election: George H. W. Bush is elected president, Dan Quayle vice president.
- 1988 – The Intermediate-Range Nuclear Forces Treaty goes into effect.

=== Presidency of George H.W. Bush ===
- January 20, 1989 – Bush becomes the 41st president, Quayle becomes the 44th vice president.
- 1989 – Time Inc. and Warner Communications announce plans for a merger, forming Time Warner.
- 1989 – The tanker Exxon Valdez oil spill in Alaska's Prince William Sound, dumping 10.8 million US gallons of oil into pristine wildlife habitat.
- 1989 – Awareness of stalking is raised with the murder of actress Rebecca Schaeffer by an obsessed fan.
- 1989 – Hurricane Hugo strikes the Caribbean and U.S. Southeast Coast, causing $7 billion in damage.
- 1989 – The 1989 Loma Prieta earthquake kills 63 in the greater San Francisco Bay Area. The quake occurs in the midst of Game 3 of the 1989 World Series, caught live on television broadcasts by ABC.
- 1989 – President Bush declares a "War on Drugs."
- 1989 – The animated television sitcom The Simpsons debuts on Fox.
- 1989 – President Bush and Soviet Premier Gorbachev release statements indicating that the Cold War between their nations may be coming to an end. Symbolic elsewhere around the world was the fall of the Berlin Wall in Germany.

== See also ==
- History of the United States (1964–1980)
- History of the United States (1980–1991)

== Sources and further reading ==
- Carlisle, Rodney P., and J. Geoffrey Golson, eds. America in Revolt During the 1960s and 1970s (ABC-CLIO, 2008).
- Carroll, Peter N. It seemed like nothing happened: America in the 1970s (Rutgers University Press, 1990). online
- Howe, Irving, and Michael Harrington, eds. The Seventies: Problems and Proposals (1973).
- Kaufman, Burton Ira. The Carter Years (ABC-CLIO, 2006)
- Kruse, Kevin M. and Julian E. Zelizer. Fault Lines: A History of the United States Since 1974 (WW Norton, 2019), scholarly history. excerpt
- Olson, James S. ed. Historical Dictionary of the 1970s (1999) excerpt
- Richards, Marlee. America in the 1970s (Twenty-First Century Books, 2010) online.
- Sandbrook, Dominic. Mad as Hell: The Crisis of the 1970s and the Rise of the Populist Right (2012) excerpt
- Schulman, Bruce J., ed. Rightward bound: Making America conservative in the 1970s (Harvard University Press, 2008).
- Thornton, Richard C. The Carter Years: Toward a New Global Order (1991), US in world affairs
- Wilentz, Sean. The Age of Reagan: A History, 1974–2008 (2007) excerpt and text search
