= Saturday Night's Main Event I =

1985 WWF television special

- Promotion: World Wrestling Federation
- Date: May 10, 1985 (aired May 11, 1985)
- City: Uniondale, New York
- Venue: Nassau Veterans Memorial Coliseum
- Attendance: 8,300

Television special chronology
← Previous; The War to Settle the Score	Next → Saturday Night's Main Event II

Saturday Night's Main Event chronology
← Previous; First	Next → II

Saturday Night's Main Event I was a professional wrestling television special produced by the World Wrestling Federation (WWF). The event took place on May 10, 1985 at the Nassau Veterans Memorial Coliseum in Uniondale, New York and aired on tape delay the following night on NBC.

== Production ==
=== Background ===
On July 23, 1984 and February 18, 1985, the WWF had aired two live television specials titled The Brawl to End it All and The War to Settle the Score on MTV with The War to Settle the Score serving as a prelude to the inaugural WrestleMania event. Following a Saturday Night Live episode which took place on the night before WrestleMania which featured Hulk Hogan and Mr. T as last-minute replacement hosts for the episode, then-SNL producer Dick Ebersol met with Vince and Linda McMahon. In the meeting, Ebersol and the McMahons agreed to a 50-50 split on production fees which resulted in Ebersol and Vince getting sent half of the fees that were sent from NBC. Prior to the taping, Ebersol and the WWF employed higher production standards for the event including multiple cameras with boom microphones and concert-quality sound.

=== Storylines ===
The event included four matches that resulted from scripted storylines. Results were predetermined by the WWF's writers. while storylines were produced on the WWF's weekly television shows, Prime Time Wrestling, Tuesday Night Titans, Championship Wrestling, and All-Star Wrestling.

=== Aftermath ===
When the event had aired, the event drew an 8.8 rating which prompted NBC to order more specials for the network in periods where SNL did not air beginning with Saturday Night's Main Event II which aired on October 3, 1985.

== Results ==
No.	Results	Stipulations	Times
1	The U.S. Express (Mike Rotunda and Barry Windham) and Ricky Steamboat (with Lou Albano) defeated Nikolai Volkoff, The Iron Sheik, and George Steele (with Freddie Blassie)	Six-man tag team match	6:30
2	Hulk Hogan (c) (with Mr. T) defeated Bob Orton (with Roddy Piper) by disqualification	Singles match for the WWF World Heavyweight Championship	6:54
3	Wendi Richter (c) (with Cyndi Lauper) defeated The Fabulous Moolah	Singles match for the WWF Women's Championship	4:00
4	Junkyard Dog (with Bertha Ritter) defeated Pete Doherty	Singles match	3:15
(c) / – the champion(s) heading into the match
