= Ranjin Singh =

Indian-American pro wrestling manager

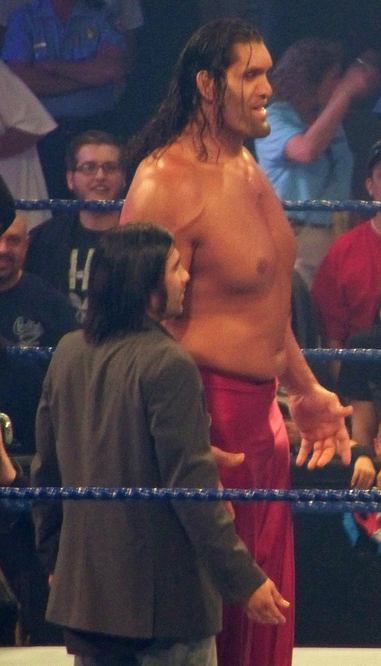
- Kapoor (left) with The Great Khali

Personal information
- Born: David Kapoor; November 17, 1975 (age 50) San Diego, California, U.S.

Professional wrestling career
- Ring name(s): Dave Kapoor; Ranjin Singh
- Billed height: 5 ft 9 in (1.75 m)
- Debut: 2007
- Retired: January 2014

David Kapoor (born November 17, 1975) is an American writer and former professional wrestling manager, better known by his ring name, Ranjin Singh. He is best known for his time in WWE, where he worked on the writing team as the senior vice president of creative and as the manager, translator, and storyline brother of The Great Khali.

== Professional wrestling career ==
In 2007, Kapoor began his career with World Wrestling Entertainment (WWE) as the heel manager and translator for The Great Khali under the ring name Ranjin Singh. On the December 21 episode of SmackDown!, Singh competed in his first match, teaming with Khali in a losing effort against Finlay and Hornswoggle. On the January 11, 2008, episode of SmackDown!, Singh challenged Hornswoggle to an Arm wrestling contest in a losing effort, after Finlay shocked Singh's hand with the glove that Hornswoggle wore during the contest. Later in 2008, Khali and Singh turned face, with the duo hosting a segment called "Khali Kiss Cam".

On the April 29, 2011, episode of SmackDown, Khali and Singh were greeted by the debuting Jinder Mahal. The following week on SmackDown, Mahal, unimpressed with how Khali and Singh were acting, confronted Singh about him mismanaging Khali. On the May 27 episode of SmackDown, after Khali was defeated by Kane, Mahal shoved Singh, with Khali then attacking Singh, ending their partnership. On the July 1 episode of SmackDown, Singh revealed that Khali joined with Mahal because they are brothers-in-law (kayfabe), with Mahal threatening to divorce Khali's sister if Khali didn't do as he said, which would bring Khali's family back into poverty. Singh was absent from television for over 2 and a half years, but managed Khali again for one night only in January 2014.

Kapoor worked for WWE behind the scenes becoming the senior vice president of the creative team in 2019. He was let go from WWE on January 5, 2022, ending his 14-year tenure there.
