= George Steele =

American professional wrestler and actor (1937–2017)

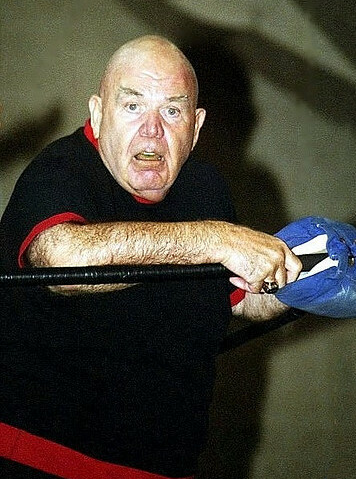
- Steele in 2009

Personal information
- Born: William James Myers; April 16, 1937 Detroit, Michigan, U.S.
- Died: February 16, 2017 (aged 79) Cocoa Beach, Florida, U.S.
- Cause of death: Kidney failure
- Education: Michigan State University; Central Michigan University
- Spouse: Pat Myers (m. 1956)
- Children: 3

Professional wrestling career
- Ring name(s): The Animal Machine; George Steele; The Student
- Billed height: 6 ft 1 in (185 cm)
- Billed weight: 275 lb (125 kg)
- Billed from: Detroit, Michigan
- Trained by: Bert Rubi
- Debut: 1960
- Retired: 2001

William James Myers (April 16, 1937 – February 16, 2017), better known by his ring name George "The Animal" Steele, was an American professional wrestler, school teacher, author, and actor. His career lasted from 1967 until 1988, though he made occasional wrestling appearances into the 1990s and 2000s.

Steele was known around the world as a professional wrestler for the WWE (then known as the WWF) and portrayed Swedish wrestler and actor Tor Johnson in Tim Burton's film Ed Wood.

== Early life ==
Myers was born in Detroit on April 16, 1937, and was raised in Madison Heights, Michigan. During high school, he found success in track, baseball, basketball, and football. In 1956, Myers entered Michigan State University as a football player for the Michigan State Spartans, but his career as a football player was immediately cut short as a result of knee problems. In 1961, he was with the Grand Rapids Blazers (UFL).

After earning a Bachelor of Science degree from Michigan State University and a master's degree from Central Michigan University, Myers became a teacher, amateur wrestling coach, and football coach at Madison High School in Madison Heights, Michigan. There he would eventually become a member of the Michigan Coaches Hall of Fame.

== Professional wrestling career ==
=== Big Time Wrestling (1965–1967) ===
Looking to supplement his income, he got into the world of Detroit-area professional wrestling, but in order to protect his privacy, he wrestled using a mask and the name "the Student". Gary Hart served as the Student's manager and had to explain to the announcers why his client could not apply any legitimate holds or maneuvers instead relying on only his undisciplined brute strength.

=== Spectator Sports / World Wide Wrestling Federation (1968–1973) ===
After being scouted by World Wide Wrestling Federation (WWWF) champion Bruno Sammartino, in 1967 Steele began working in Pittsburgh on Spectator Sports' popular Studio Wrestling TV show broadcast on WIIC-TV (later WPXI-TV) Channel 11. Sammartino had liked the character Myers developed of a wild man with incredible strength. However, he had him drop the mask, as well as the title of the Student. Looking to hide his real name, Myers opted for the alias "George Steele". According to Michigan High School Hall of Fame coach George Steele of Warren, he and Myers were coaching against each other in a high school JV match-up while both were early into their careers. At halftime, Myers approached Steele and told him about his venture into wrestling and that he was looking for a name. Myers allegedly asked Steele if he could use his name, that he liked it a lot and the future Hall of Fame coach told him no problem. Steele states in an interview available on YouTube that he was in Pittsburgh when he was looking for a stage name. Local wrestler "Jumpin'" John DeFazio suggested Jim Steele since he was in the "Steel City". He did not like the first name Jim and he suggested George which is what he eventually went with.

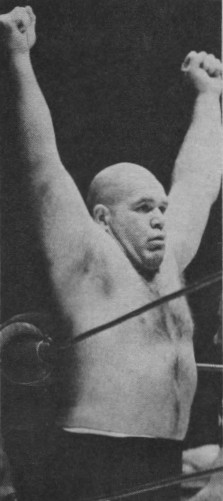
Steele, circa 1972

Working well with Sammartino, in 1968 Steele was invited for a full run in the WWWF. He told WWWF TV commentator Ray Morgan that he was the nephew of Ray Steele (kayfabe) and had an extensive amateur background. He sold the story by using an array of armlocks on opponents, weakening them for his finisher, the flying hammerlock (Steele would lift his opponents off the mat by a hammerlocked arm). He also revealed his teaching background to interviewers that made his in-ring Neanderthal image all the more incongruous. He wrestled Sammartino to an hour-long draw at Madison Square Garden but lost the rematch. In Boston, being set up to face Sammartino for a long series in that city, he got one of the few clean wins over Victor Rivera, a top babyface, with the flying hammerlock submission, at a huge Fenway Park outdoor show. He was then relegated to a feud with Chief Jay Strongbow, and lost to Edouard Carpentier at the Garden before taking a brief hiatus to reinvent his wildman character.

=== All Japan Pro Wrestling (1974) ===
In mid-1974, Steele toured Japan with All Japan Pro Wrestling.

=== World Wide Wrestling Federation (1975) ===
Steele returned to the WWWF in 1975.

=== World Wide Wrestling Federation (1977–1978) ===
Steele returned to the WWWF once more in 1977–1978.

=== New Japan Pro-Wrestling (1979) ===
In 1979, Steele toured Japan with New Japan Pro-Wrestling.

=== World Wide Wrestling Federation (1981) ===
Steele returned to the WWWF once more in 1981.

=== World Wrestling Federation (1983–1988) ===
Steele returned to the WWF in May 1983. He eventually became one of the more popular and recognizable wrestlers during most of the 1980s professional wrestling boom. He turned face in May 1985 during Saturday Night's Main Event I when his partners in a six-man match, Nikolai Volkoff and The Iron Sheik, abandoned him to their opponents, Ricky Steamboat and the U.S. Express (Barry Windham and Mike Rotunda), leading to Steele being taken under the wing of the Express' manager, Capt. Lou Albano, who consoled him following the loss.

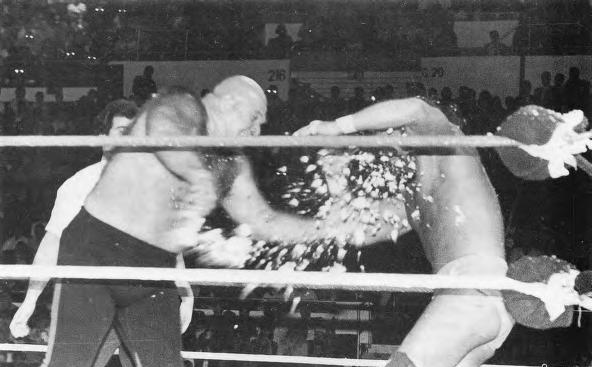
Steele (left) smashes a bouquet on Randy Savage, circa 1986

Perhaps Steele's most famous feud was in 1986 against "Macho Man" Randy Savage, after Steele developed a crush on Savage's valet, Miss Elizabeth. The feud was meant to last only a couple of months (and end with Steele being disappointed), but it proved so popular with fans that it continued well into 1987. Steele later laughingly recalled Savage's jealousy regarding Elizabeth, his real-life wife, and said he assured Savage that he had a daughter older than Elizabeth and that his infatuation was just for the show. Steele would later say that Savage was the most "jealous man" he ever met. During Savage's Intercontinental Championship match against Steamboat at WrestleMania III, Steele—who was in Steamboat's corner—twice interfered in the match. First, he took the ring bell from Savage as he attempted to use it off of the top rope. Secondly, after Savage kicked him and took the bell back, Steele shoved Savage off of the top rope, allowing Steamboat to roll up Savage for the pin to win the championship.

In 1988, Steele began carrying a stuffed animal named "Mine" to the ring. He participated in the Wrestlemania IV Battle Royal but was outside of the ring the whole time. According to Steele, he suffered a knee injury at a house show prior to the event, which was the reason he didn't get in the ring.

=== Retirement (1988–1997) ===
In late 1988, Steele retired after being diagnosed with Crohn's disease. Steele then became a road agent for the WWF until he was released in October 1990 due to budget cuts. Soon after, however, Steele was re-hired by the WWF and continued to work as an agent until the late 1990s. Though he left the WWF without any WWF championships behind him, Steele grew to become one of the most recognized and popular figures in WWF history and was inducted into the WWF Hall of Fame class of 1995.

=== Late career (1997–2001) ===
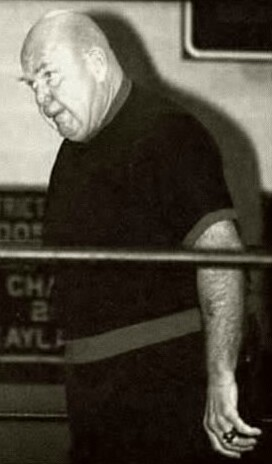
Steele in 2009

Steele returned to wrestling in 1997 working in the independent circuit. Later that year on December 29, he teamed with Taka Michinoku on Monday Night Raw losing to Taka' rival Brian Christopher and Jerry Lawler by disqualification . In 1998, during the WWF's "Attitude Era", Steele returned as part of The Oddities until leaving in 1999. He lost to Greg Valentine at Heroes of Wrestling on October 10, 1999. Then on January 10, 2000, he appeared on an episode of WCW Monday Nitro as one of three legends Jeff Jarrett had to face that night. He continued wrestling in the indies until his final match defeating Angel Armoni at All American Wrestling in Eau Claire, Wisconsin on July 29, 2001.

In 2008, Steele made an appearance at Total Nonstop Action Wrestling's 2008 Slammiversary pay-per-view event as a groomsman in the wedding of Jay Lethal and SoCal Val, along with Koko B. Ware, Kamala, and Jake "The Snake" Roberts. He made a surprise appearance on WWE Raw on November 15, 2010, during a match between Kofi Kingston and David Otunga.

== Professional wrestling style and persona ==
As George "the Animal" Steele, Myers portrayed a crazed heel, acting like a wild man in the ring, tearing up the turnbuckle with his teeth and using the stuffing as a weapon as well as sticking out his green tongue (an effect accomplished by eating green Clorets breath mints). The Animal had a stooped posture and a hairless head, but a thick mat of fur on his back; wrestling broadcasters often speculated that The Animal was indeed "the missing link". At best, The Animal could occasionally manage to utter a word or two during interviews with one of them usually being "Duh-da-dahh" or "You! You go!"

As Steele recalled in a later shoot interview, his infamous "Duh-dahh" interview style happened by accident. Throughout his career, Steele prided himself on being able to cut eloquent and effective promos and ranked his mic skills with the best in the business. At a WWF TV taping in the early 1980s, he was cutting one of these promos when Vince McMahon cut him off and reminded Steele that his gimmick was the "Animal", and for an animal, he was "making too much sense". Incensed, Steele did a second take of nothing but garbled and incoherent syllables ("Duhh-dahh"). Steele did this deliberately and out of pure frustration, thinking that McMahon would acquiesce and allow Steele to cut his normal, eloquent promos. Much to Steele's shock, McMahon replied, "That's exactly what I want!", and this would remain Steele's interview style for the rest of his WWF run. Steele started to fully cultivate his gimmick of a menacing imbecile.

Steele's finishing move was the flying hammerlock.

== Acting career ==
In 1994, Steele made his professional acting debut as Swedish wrestler-turned-actor Tor Johnson in Tim Burton's Ed Wood. Coincidentally, Steele was often mistaken for Johnson earlier in his career. According to Steele, a New York novelty shop once sold a Tor Johnson mask as a George Steele mask to increase sales, due to Steele's popularity at the time.

In 2008, Steele co-starred with Greg Valentine in a short film entitled Somethin Fishy, in which the two former wrestlers purchase a fishing camp. The film served as the pilot for a comedy series that was not developed further.

Steele also appeared in a Minolta commercial with actor Tony Randall.

== Personal life and death ==
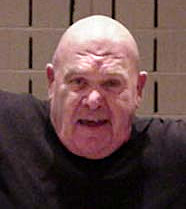
Steele in 2005

Myers had dyslexia and in 1988 was diagnosed with Crohn's disease. In 1998, doctors told Myers that his Crohn's Disease had gone into remission and that he no longer suffered from any of the disease's symptoms. In 2002, to prevent the symptoms from returning, Myers had his colon removed.

Myers was a devout Christian. He attended the First Baptist Church Merritt Island and lived in Cocoa Beach, Florida, with his wife Pat, whom he married before he entered Michigan State in 1956. Together, Pat and Jim had a daughter, Felicia, followed by two sons, Dennis and Randy.

On February 16, 2017, Myers died in hospice care due to kidney failure, at the age of 79.

== Other media ==
Steele appeared as a character in four WWE video games: WWE SmackDown! Here Comes the Pain, WWE Champions, WWE SuperCard, and WWE 2K24. He also featured in all three games in the Legends of Wrestling series.

Steele's autobiography, Animal, was released on June 1, 2013.

A song about Steele titled "George Steele" appears on the album Charmed Life by punk rock band Half Japanese.

== Filmography ==
Year	Title	Role	Notes
1986	Ruthless People	Wrestler on TV	Uncredited
1994	Ed Wood	Tor Johnson	
1996	Squeegee	Boss	Short film
1997	Used Cars	Sgt. George Steele	Short film
1997	Blowfish	Henry	
2003	Small Town Conspiracy	Tortuga Jack	Also known as Florida City
2008	South of Heaven	The Man	
2010	Boston Girls	Harold	

== Championships and accomplishments ==
- Big Time Wrestling
  - NWA World Tag Team Championship (Detroit version) (1 time) – with Frankie Laine
- Cauliflower Alley Club
  - Other honoree (2004)
- Grande Wrestling Alliance
  - GWA Heavyweight Championship (1 time)
- Upstate Wrestling
  - North American Heavyweight Championship (1 time)
- Professional Wrestling Hall of Fame
  - Class of 2005
- Pro Wrestling Illustrated
  - PWI ranked him # 267 of the 500 best singles wrestlers during the "PWI Years" in 2003.
- Superstars of Wrestling (Newfoundland)
  - SoW Canadian Heavyweight Championship (1 time)
- World Wrestling Federation
  - WWF Hall of Fame (Class of 1995)
  - Slammy Award (1 time)
    - Best Performance by an Animal (1987)
- Wrestling Observer Newsletter
  - Most Embarrassing Wrestler (1987, 1988)
  - Worst Feud of the Year (1987) vs. Danny Davis
  - Worst Tag Team (1986) with Junkyard Dog
