= Steel City Wrestling Heavyweight Championship =

SCW Heavyweight Championship
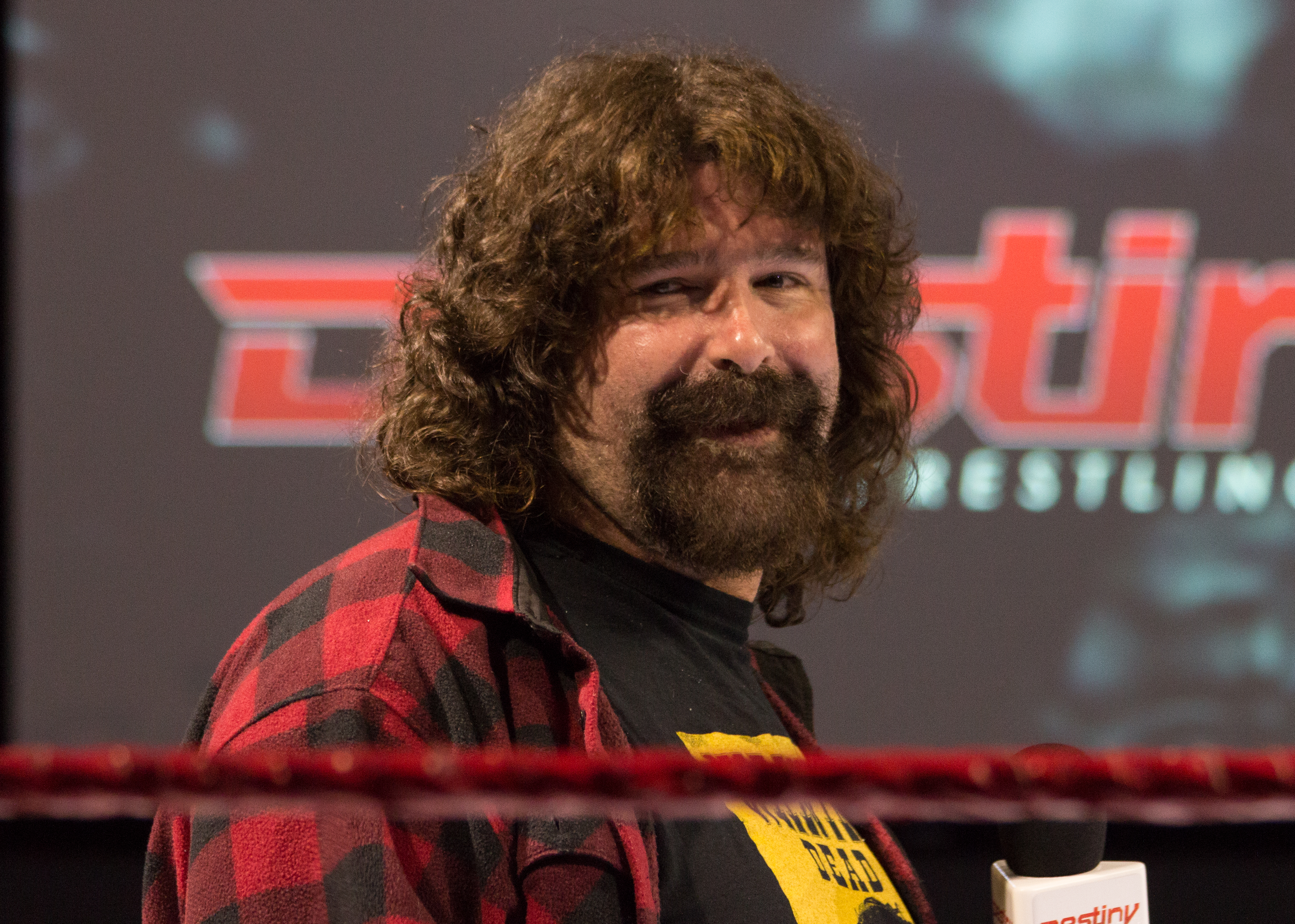
- Cactus Jack is a former SCW Heavyweight Champion.

Details
- Promotion: Steel City Wrestling
- Date established: October 8, 1994
- Date retired: 2000
Statistics
- First champion: T. Rantula
- Final champion: T. Rantula
- Most reigns: T. Rantula (4 reigns)
- Longest reign: Johnny Gunn (892)
- Shortest reign: T. Rantula (1)
- Oldest champion: Cueball Carmichael (38 years, 360 days)
- Youngest champion: Johnny Gunn (29 years, 135 days)
- Heaviest champion: T. Rantula (325 lb (147 kg))
- Lightest champion: Cody Michaels (220 lb (100 kg))

The SCW Heavyweight Championship was a professional wrestling championship in Steel City Wrestling (SCW). The title was the top championship of the SCW promotion. It was the first singles championship established in SCW, having been introduced in 1994, in the finals of a four-man tournament.

The inaugural champion was T. Rantula, who defeated Shane Douglas in a tournament final on October 8, 1994 to become the first SCW Heavyweight Champion. T. Rantula holds the record for most reigns, with four. At 892 days, Johnny Gunn first and only reign is the longest in the title's history. T. Rantula's third reign was the shortest in the history of the title having been stripped of the championship the day after he won it. The previous champion, Cueball Carmichael, had won control of SCW for 30 days prior to their match. He justified the decision as T. Rantula had been a substitute for his originally scheduled opponent Dennis Gregory. Overall, there have been 12 reigns shared between 7 wrestlers, with one vacancy, and 1 deactivation.

== Title history ==
Key

#	Order in reign history
Reign	The reign number for the specific wrestler listed
Location	The city in which the title was won
Event	The event in which the title was won
—	Used for vacated reigns so as not to count it as an official reign
N/A	The information is not available or is unknown

No.	Champion	Reign	Date	Days held	Location	Event	Notes	Ref(s).
1	T. Rantula	1	October 8, 1994	162	Connellsville, Pennsylvania	Live event	T. Rantula defeated Shane Douglas in a tournament final to become the first SCW Heavyweight Champion.	
2	Cactus Jack	1	March 19, 1995	21	New Castle, Pennsylvania	Live event		
3	T. Rantula	2	April 9, 1995	226	Edgewood, Pennsylvania	Deaf Wrestlefest (1995)		
4	Johnny Gunn	1	November 21, 1995	892	Connellsville, Pennsylvania	Live event		
5	Lou Marconi	1	May 1, 1998	119	Irwin, Pennsylvania	Live event		
6	Dennis Gregory	1	August 28, 1998	379	Irwin, Pennsylvania	Live event		
7	Lou Marconi	2	September 11, 1998	72	Irwin, Pennsylvania	Live event	Marconi was awarded the championship when the Pennsylvania State Athletic Commission stripped Dennis Gregory of the title.	
8	Dennis Gregory	2	November 22, 1998	91	Irwin, Pennsylvania	Live event	This was a lumberjack match.	
9	Cody Michaels	1	February 21, 1999	104	Irwin, Pennsylvania	Live event		
10	Cueball Carmichael	1	June 5, 1999	106	Jeannette, Pennsylvania	Live event		
11	T. Rantula	3	September 19, 1999	1	White Oak, Pennsylvania	Live event		
—	Vacated	—	September 20, 1999	—	N/A	N/A	Carmichael, having won control of SCW for 30 days, stripped T. Rantula of the title due to Dennis Gregory being his original opponent. He subsequently orders a tournament to decide a new champion.	
12	T. Rantula	4	November 21, 1999	N/A	White Oak, Pennsylvania	Live event	T. Rantula defeated Dennis Gregory in a tournament final to win the vacant title.	
—	Deactivated	—	2000	—	N/A	N/A	SCW closed during the summer of 2000, and the championship was retired.	

== List of combined reigns ==
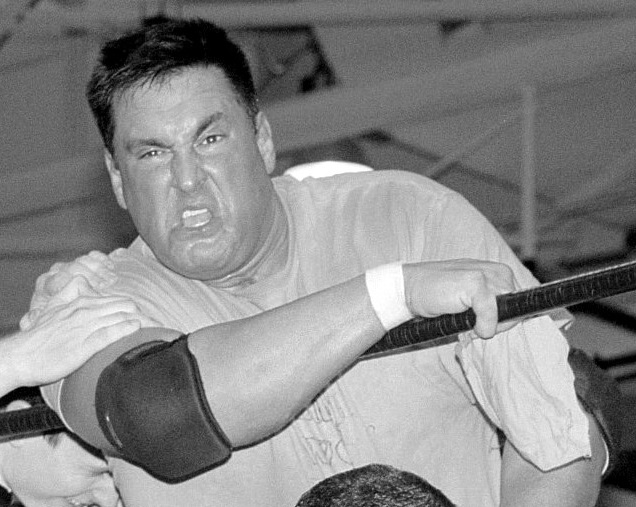
Johnny Gunn, who was the longest-reigning SCW Heavyweight Champion

Rank	Wrestler	No. of reigns	Combined days	Ref(s).
1	Johnny Gunn	1	892	
2	T. Rantula	4	389+	
3	Dennis Gregory	2	230	
4	Lou Marconi	2	191	
5	Cueball Carmichael	1	106	
6	Cody Michaels	1	104	
7	Cactus Jack	1	21	
