= SCW Television Championship =

Professional wrestling championship

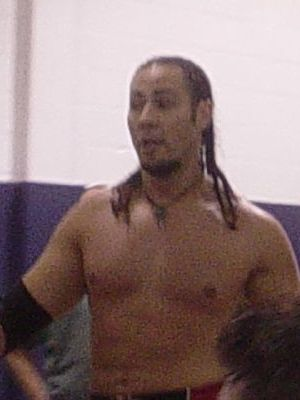
- Julio Sanchez was the final SCW Television Champion

Details
- Promotion: Steel City Wrestling
- Date established: October 18, 1998
- Date retired: 2000
Statistics
- First champion: Don Montoya
- Final champion: Julio Sanchez
- Most reigns: Don Montoya (2 reigns); Lou Marconi (2 reigns)
- Longest reign: Don Montoya (140)
- Shortest reign: Joey Mercury (<1)
- Oldest champion: Tom Brandi (32 years, 315 days)
- Youngest champion: Joey Matthews (19 years, 306 days)
- Heaviest champion: The Blue Meanie (310 lb (140 kg))
- Lightest champion: Joey Matthews (185 lb (84 kg))

The SCW Television Championship was a professional wrestling championship in Steel City Wrestling (SCW). The title was a secondary championship of the SCW promotion. It was the third singles championship established in SCW, having been introduced in 1998, in the finals of an eight-man tournament.

The inaugural champion was Don Montoya, who defeated Joey Centerfold in a tournament final on October 18, 1998, to become the first SCW Television Champion. Montoya and Lou Marconi are tied for the record of most reigns, with two each. At 140 days, Montoya's second reign is the longest in the title's history. Joey Matthews' third reign was the shortest in the history of the title lasting less than a day. He had previously been awarded the champion via forfeit when then champion, The Blue Meanie, failed to appear for a scheduled title defense. Matthews was attacked by Lou Marconi during his acceptance speech and lost the title in the impromptu match; Marconi was pinned for the belt by Tom Brandi that same night. Overall, there have been 8 reigns shared between 6 wrestlers with 1 deactivation.

== Title history ==
Key

#	Order in reign history
Reign	The reign number for the specific wrestler listed
Location	The city in which the title was won
Event	The event in which the title was won
—	Used for vacated reigns so as not to count it as an official reign
N/A	The information is not available or is unknown

No.	Champion	Reign	Date	Days held	Location	Event	Notes	Ref(s).
1	Don Montoya	1	October 18, 1998	63	Irwin, Pennsylvania	Live event	Montoya defeated Joey Centerfold in a tournament final to become the first SCW Television Champion. Aired October 23, 1998 on tape delay.	
2	Lou Marconi	1	December 20, 1998	28	Irwin, Pennsylvania	Live event		
3	The Blue Meanie	1	January 17, 1999	123	Weirton, West Virginia	Live event		
4	Joey Matthews	1	May 20, 1999	<1	Irwin, Pennsylvania	Live event	Matthews won the championship due to forfeit.	
5	Lou Marconi	2	May 20, 1999	<1	Irwin, Pennsylvania	Live event		
6	Tom Brandi	1	May 20, 1999	16	Irwin, Pennsylvania	Live event		
7	Don Montoya	2	June 5, 1999	140	Jeannette, Pennsylvania	Live event		
8	Julio Sanchez	1	October 23, 1999	N/A	Elizabeth, Pennsylvania	Uncivil War Tour '99		
—	Deactivated	—	2000	—	N/A	N/A	SCW closed during the summer of 2000, and the championship was retired.	

== List of combined reigns ==
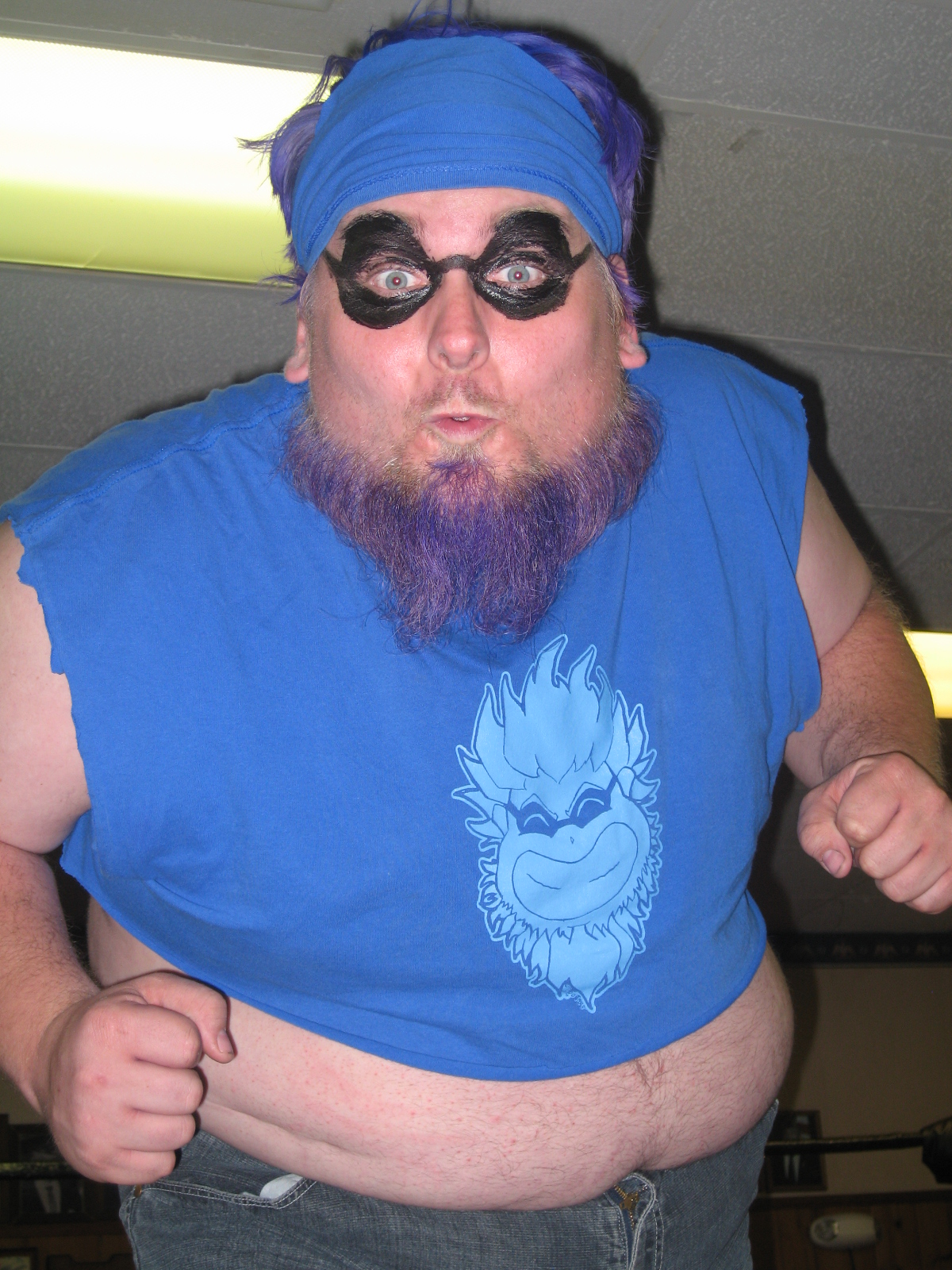
The Blue Meanie, in addition to being a 3-time SCW Tag Team Champion, was a former SCW Television Champion

Rank	Wrestler	No. of reigns	Combined days	Ref(s).
1	Don Montoya	2	203	
2	The Blue Meanie	1	123	
3	Lou Marconi	2	28	
4	Tom Brandi	1	16	
5	Joey Matthews	1	<1	
6	Julio Sanchez	1	N/A	
