= SCW Tag Team Championship (Steel City Wrestling) =

Professional wrestling tag team championship

Details
- Promotion: Steel City Wrestling
- Date established: September 24, 1994
- Date retired: 2000
Statistics
- First champions: Lou Marconi and Derek Stone
- Final champions: The Dope Show (Lord Zoltan and Shirley Doe)
- Longest reign: The Dope Show (218)
- Shortest reign: Frank Stalletto and Stevie Richards (<1)

The SCW Tag Team Championship was a professional wrestling championship promoted by Steel City Wrestling (SCW). The title was the main tag team championship of the SCW promotion. It was the first-ever championship established in SCW, having been introduced in 1994, in the finals of a tournament.

The inaugural champions were Lou Marconi and Derek Stone, who defeated Beauty & The Beast (Frank Stalletto and Futureshock) in a tournament final on September 24, 1994, to become the first SCW Tag Team Champions. No team won the title more than once. At 406 days, reign is the longest in the title's history, while the team of Frank Stalletto and Stevie Richards' first reign was the shortest, at less than one day. Overall, there were 11 reigns among 11 teams, with three vacancies, and 1 deactivation.

== Title history ==
Key

Symbol	Meaning
No.	The overall championship reign
Reign	The reign number for the specific set of wrestlers listed
Event	The event promoted by the respective promotion in which the title changed hands
N/A	The specific information has not been found
—	Used for vacated reigns so as not to count it as an official reign

No.	Champions	Reign	Date	Days held	Location	Event	Notes	Ref(s)
1	Lou Marconi and Derek Stone	1	September 24, 1994	[[79]]	Munhall, Pennsylvania	Live event	Defeated Frank Stalletto and Futureshock in a tournament final to become the first SCW Tag Team Champions.	
2	Beauty & The Beast (Frank Stalletto and Futureshock)	1	December 12, 1994	95	Parkersburg, West Virginia	Live event		
3	Black & Blue (Lou Marconi (2) and Black Cat)	1	March 17, 1995	218	Plum, Pennsylvania	Live event		
4	Frank Stalletto (2) and Stevie Richards	1	October 21, 1995	<1	Connellsville, Pennsylvania	Live event		
—	Vacated	1	October 21, 1995	N/A	N/A	N/A	Championship vacated when Richards and Raven attacked Stalletto immediately after winning the title.	
5	Frank Stalletto (3) and Lou Marconi (3)	1	November 11, 1995	162	St. Mary's, Pennsylvania	Live event	Defeated Stevie Richards and Brian Rollins to win the vacant championship.	
6	Stevie Richards (2) and The Blue Meanie	1	April 21, 1996	N/A	Edgewood, Pennsylvania	Deaf Wrestlefest (1996)		
—	Vacated	1	May 1997	N/A	N/A	N/A	Championship vacated when Stevie Richards was injured.	
7	Cactus Jack and The Blue Meanie (2)	1	February 8, 1998	N/A	Irwin, Pennsylvania	Live event	Defeated Frank Stalletto and Lou Marconi to win the vacant championship.	
—	Vacated	1	November 1998	N/A	N/A	N/A	Championship vacated after Cactus Jack left SCW	
8	Super Nova and The Blue Meanie (3)	1	November 22, 1998	28	Irwin, Pennsylvania	Live event	Defeated High Society (Cueball Carmichael and Jimmy Cicero) to win the vacant championship.	
9	The Bad Street Boys (Joey Matthews and Christian York)	1	December 20, 1998	[[102]]	Irwin, Pennsylvania	Live event	Defeated The Blue Meanie and Julio Sanchez (substituting for an injured Super Nova).	
10	Lou Marconi (4) and Dennis Gregory	1	April 1, 1999	N/A	Irwin, Pennsylvania	Live event		
—	Vacated	1	N/A	N/A	N/A	N/A	Championship vacated after Lou Marconi left SCW	
11	The Dope Show (Lord Zoltan and Shirley Doe)	1	November 21, 1999	N/A	White Oak, Pennsylvania	Live event	Defeated Powerhouse Hughes and Seth James to win the vacant championship.	
—	Deactivated	—	2000	—	N/A	N/A	SCW closed during the summer of 2000, and the championship was retired.	
