= Steel City Wrestling =

Professional wrestling promotion

Steel City Wrestling (SCW)
- Company type: Private
- Industry: Professional wrestling
- Founded: 1994
- Founder: Norm Connors
- Defunct: 2000
- Headquarters: Latrobe, Pennsylvania, U.S.
- Key people: Norm Connors – President; Andrew Lazarchik - Vice president

Steel City Wrestling (SCW) was a professional wrestling promotion that was founded in Pittsburgh, Pennsylvania, in 1994 by Norm Connors. It was the top promotion in the Pittsburgh metropolitan area during the 1990s, along with the National Wrestling Alliance-affiliated Pro Wrestling eXpress, and was regarded by many in the industry as one of the best independent promotions on the East Coast of the United States.

For many years, SCW was the home promotion of Pittsburgh "legends" such as Lord Zoltan and T. Rantula as well as many prominent indy stars in the region including Cueball Carmichael, Dennis Gregory, Lou Marconi, Jimmy Cicero, Frank Stalletto, Tom Brandi, Mike Quackenbush, Reckless Youth, and The Bad Street Boys (Joey Matthews and Christian York). The promotion also regularly featured talent from Extreme Championship Wrestling. Future ECW stars Julio Dinero, Stevie Richards, and The Blue Meanie all started their careers in SCW. Unlike its Philadelphia counterpart, however, the promotion had a much more "family friendly" atmosphere. In addition, SCW co-hosted the original Deaf Wrestlefest benefit shows with Lord Zoltan for the Western Pennsylvania School for the Deaf from 1994 to 2000.

== History ==
=== Early years ===
Steel City Wrestling was started by Norm Connors in the fall of 1994. On October 8, 1994, the promotion crowned its first heavyweight champion in Connellsville, Pennsylvania, when T. Rantula defeated Shane Douglas in a 4-man tournament final. Lord Zoltan also beat Scott McKeever for the SCW Light Heavyweight Championship. Two weeks earlier, at an ACW show in Munhall, Lou Marconi and Dereck Stone had won the SCW Tag Team Championship after defeating Beauty & The Beast (Frank Stalletto and Futureshock). That same year, SCW co-hosted the first of Lord Zoltan's Deaf Wrestlefest shows for the Western Pennsylvania School for the Deaf in Edgewood, Pennsylvania. The event would become an annual supercard for the promotion, attracting many former National Wrestling Alliance and World Wrestling Federation alumni, as well as top indy stars, and became the school's most important fundraiser during its original 6-year run. Connors, who had performed as "heel" manager Notorious Norm on the local independent circuit, was able to use his connections to bring in legendary WWF wrestlers such as King Kong Bundy, Koko B. Ware, Virgil, and "Superfly" Jimmy Snuka and pitted them against local stars. Bundy, and future WWE Superstar Mick Foley in particular, would agree to wrestle on SCW shows at a reduced cost due to their personal friendship with Connors. This was critical to SCW's early success as "big name" wrestlers could often bring in thousands of dollars for an independent show.

=== Cooperation with Extreme Championship Wrestling ===
SCW often cooperated with Extreme Championship Wrestling, another local up-and-coming promotion out of Philadelphia, and regularly featured ECW talent. SCW was among the early independent promotions Cactus Jack wrestled for, in between ECW and Japan, and ended T. Rantula's first title reign in New Castle on March 19, 1995. A number of ECW wrestlers were directly involved in SCW storylines. On October 21, 1995, Stevie Richards turned on Frank Stalletto, attacking him with Raven, immediately after winning the SCW tag team titles from Black & Blue (Black Cat and Lou Marconi) in Connellsville. SCW mainstays Marconi and Stalletto won the titles from Stevie Richards and Brian Rollins in St. Mary's, Pennsylvania, a month later. They would go on to become one of SCW's most successful tag teams. Mikey Whipwreck and Pablo Marquez also battled each other during the show to earn a title shot at light heavyweight champion Lord Zoltan.

That same year, The Blue Meanie attracted the attention of Raven and Stevie Richards while working at a 2-day SCW event in Pittsburgh. Raven had the idea that the unusual-looking wrestler would be perfect as a "lackey" of Stevie Richards, who was his own comic sidekick in ECW, and brought him to Philadelphia as a member of Raven's Nest. The Blue Meanie and Richards continued appearing in SCW and regained the SCW Tag Team Championship at Deaf Wrestlefest 1996. They held the belts for nearly two years before the title was vacated due to an injury suffered by Richards.

=== Connors-Lazarchik partnership ===
These early SCW shows ran sporadically due to Connors activity as a wrestling manager on the independent circuit and, specifically, his commitments to the National Wrestling Alliance-affiliated Pro Wrestling eXpress. In April 1996, Connors met Andrew Lazarchik, then a student at LaRoche College, at a wrestling show Carlynton High School. This chance meeting would be the beginning of a four-year partnership between the two men. Lazarchik joined Connors in PWX as a color commentator on its late-night television show. On September 21, 1997, an interpromotional PWX-SCW show was held at Pittsburgh's Sullivan Hall. At the end of that year, Connors and Lazarchik left the company due to creative differences with PWX management. They decided to run SCW full-time and began promoting shows in January 1998. Connors, still retaining ownership of the promotion, was the head booker and wrote the majority of the storylines. As vice president, Lazarchik handled the promotional side of the company by overseeing advertising and designing promotional material. Both men were also active SCW performers. Connors, continuing his "gimmick" as manager Notorious Norm, had an on-air role as SCW President while Lazarchik became "heel" manager "Hot Shot" Drew Lazario.

Their "home arena" was the SCW Arena in Irwin, Pennsylvania. SCW held shows throughout the Pittsburgh metropolitan area, especially the Mon Valley, before branching out to Ohio and West Virginia. In 1998 alone, with its weekly shows drew over 300 wrestling fans, SCW held 25 shows of which 21 made a profit and 4 broke even. Additionally, the company's mailing list increased from 100 to 600. Lazarchik partially attributed wrestling's popularity in the region during this period to the World Wrestling Federation's sold-out shows at the Pittsburgh Civic Arena that year. During a time when the WWF's "Attitude Era" influenced the 1990s wrestling boom, the promoters prided themselves on being a "family friendly" company boasting that "some of our biggest fans are senior citizens and little kids". Younger wrestling fans especially had the opportunity to interact with wrestlers during SCW shows. SCW also held wrestling shows to raise money for local schools and fire departments. Charitable organizations would pay them a "set fee" for the costs setting up the show, such as purchasing insurance for the venture and turning over 5% to the Pennsylvania Athletic Commission, while the charity would collect proceeds from the ticket sales. One of these benefit shows, "Brawl at Sullivan Hall" in Mount Washington, became one of the promotion's annual supercards.

On February 8, 1998, Cactus Jack and The Blue Meanie captured the vacant tag team titles from Lou Marconi and Frank Stalletto in Irwin, Pennsylvania. That same show also saw Reckless Youth end the three-year reign of Lord Zoltan as SCW Junior Heavyweight Champion. SCW was among the battlegrounds during Reckless Youth's feuds with Christian York and Mike Quackenbush. On May 1, 1998, Stevie Richards returned to SCW after a six-month absence to help Lou Marconi beat Tom Brandi for the SCW Heavyweight Championship. In one of his first matches after undergoing neck surgery, Richards defeated Frank Stalletto at an SCW show later that month. On May 23, SCW co-hosted an interpromotional show with MAPW in Medina, Ohio. The following night, SCW held a show at Ainsworth Field in Erie, Pennsylvania, featuring The Pitbulls (Pittbull #1 and Pitbull #2) and The Bushwhackers (Bushwhacker Butch and Bushwhacker Luke). Stevie Richards served as special guest referee in a match between Tom Brandi and Corporal Punishment. The promotion also began airing a weekly Friday night television show, Steel City Wrestling TV, on WNPA. On October 18, 1998, Don Montoya was crowned the first SCW Television Champion following his victory over Joey Matthews in the finals of a one-night 8-man championship tournament. At the end of the year, The Bad Street Boys (Joey Matthews and Christian York) captured the SCW Tag Team Championship from Blue Meanie and Super Nova in Irwin, Pennsylvania.

On February 21, 1999, Cody Michaels won the SCW Heavyweight Championship from Dennis Gregory at the SCW Arena with the help of longtime friend Shane Douglas. On May 15, 1999, SCW was one of twelve independent promotions from across the country to participate in the Break the Barrier supercard at Philadelphia's Viking Hall. The promotion was officially represented by Mike Quackenbush, Lou Marconi, and Don Montoya who wrestled in a Three Way Dance for the SCW "Lord of the Dance" Championship. Jay Kirell of CagesideSeats.com called their bout "by far the match of the night" and is credited for greatly enhancing the early career of Quackenbush. The title was created specifically to be defended in Three Way Dance matches. A week later at a SCW show in Cambridge, Ohio, Mankind was the special referee in a wild brawl between T. Rantula and Lou Marconi. He and Notorious Norm got into an altercation near the end of the match which saw the WWF superstar attack Connors (and subsequently Marconi) with Mr. Socko allowing T. Rantula to win the bout.

=== Feud with High Society ===
In his role as SCW President, Notorious Norm was often challenged by various heel factions attempting to "take over" the company. The most serious "threat" to the promotion was High Society (Tom Brandi, Cueball Carmichael, and Jimmy Cicero) who managed to gain control of 40% of SCW by the summer of 1999. On June 5, SCW made its debut in Jeannette, Pennsylvania, where Cody Michaels lost the SCW Heavyweight title to Cueball Carmichael. Carmichael won the bout due to outside interference from Dennis Gregory who had lost the belt to Michaels four months earlier. In the main event, WWF Light Heavyweight Champion Gillberg defeated Rich Myers.

High Society would temporarily win control of SCW when Carmichael defeated Notorious Norm in a singles match on September 19, 1999. Little Jeannie also defeated Lexi Fife during the show to become the first SCW Women's Champion; she had defeated manager Drew Lazario in the semi-finals earlier that night. SCW was profiled by the Pittsburgh Post-Gazette that same month.

=== Demise ===
In the spring of 2000, Connors decided to close SCW. Although the promotion was still highly popular, Connors chose to focus on his regular career as a funeral director. He had been able to promote wrestling events on the weekend while at mortuary school, however, he felt his work schedule significantly limited his time to book shows. Connors had been struggling with both since his graduation the previous summer. The promotion's final show was held that summer. Connors addressed the crowd at the conclusion of the show to thank the fans, wrestlers, and Lazarchik. SCW was regarded by many in the industry as one of the top promotions on the East Coast at the time of its close.

== Reunions ==
On October 25, 2000, Lazarchik booked an "unofficial" reunion show in T. Rantula's Far North Wrestling. It was held at Blazer's Family Fun Center in Irwin with Don Montoya, Mike Quackenbush, and Reckless Youth in a Three Way Dance for the main event. Lazarchik planned another similar show in Irwin on December 13, 2000.

=== International Wrestling Cartel ===
In the spring of 2001, Norm Connors resumed promoting wrestling events. He partnered with B94 morning radio host Bubba The Bulldog to form the International Wrestling Cartel in West Mifflin, Pennsylvania. The promotion used many former Steel City Wrestling stars, as well as younger indy wrestlers, and was considered the successor of SCW. Connors ran the IWC for eight years before selling the promotion to Chuck Roberts and retiring once again.

=== Steel City Wrestlefest ===
On May 24, 2008, the International Wrestling Cartel and Pro Wrestling eXpress hosted an interpromotional supercard entitled "Steel City Wrestlefest" at the Rostraver Ice Garden in Belle Vernon, Pennsylvania. It was held as a charity event for the Cystic Fibrosis Foundation. The main event was a Tables, Ladders, and Chairs match between Justin Idol and CJ Sensation, which Idol won. Two featured bouts were scheduled on the undercard, including a "Best of Pittsburgh" Three Way Dance involving Dennis Gregory, Bad Boy BA, and Jimmy Vegas, with Dominic DeNucci as special guest referee, and a first-ever singles match between Sterling James Keenan and Chris Masters. The rest of the card involved a mix of SCW alumni as well as top indy stars from throughout the country. Both Kurt Angle and Bruno Sammartino were also scheduled to appear at the show, with Angle to meet local radio host Bubba the Bulldog in a wrestling match.

== Championships and programming ==
=== Championships ===
Championship	Notes
SCW Heavyweight Championship	The heavyweight title of SCW. It was established in 1994 and continued to be defended within the promotion until 2000.
SCW Tag Team Championship	The tag team title of SCW. It was established in 1994 and continued to be defended until 2000.
SCW Junior Heavyweight Championship	The title was established in 1994 and continued to be defended until 2000.
SCW Television Championship	The title was established in 1998 and continued to be defended until 2000.
SCW Lord of the Dance Championship	The title was established in 1999, to be specifically contested in Three Way Dance matches, and was defended through the year.
SCW Women's Championship	The title was established in 1999 and was defended through the year.

=== Programming ===
Programming	Notes
Steel City Wrestling TV	(1998–2000) Syndicated, also broadcast on UPN.

== See also ==
- Deaf Wrestlefest
- Payback (2023)
