= Lou Marconi =

American professional wrestler

Personal information
- Born: June 19, 1973 (age 53) Brooklyn, Ohio, U.S.

Professional wrestling career
- Ring name(s): Lou Marconi "Beef Stew" Lou Marconi; Lou Marcolli
- Billed height: 5 ft 11 in (1.80 m)
- Billed weight: 233 lb (106 kg)
- Billed from: Cleveland, Ohio; Brooklyn, New York
- Trained by: Charlie Fulton
- Debut: June 19, 1993

Lou Marconi (born June 19, 1973) is an American professional wrestler, trainer, and occasional actor. He has wrestled in numerous independent promotions in the Mid-Atlantic and Midwestern United States since his debut in 1992.

Marconi was a major star in Pennsylvania-based Pro Wrestling eXpress and Steel City Wrestling during the mid-to late 1990s. He held every championship title in both promotions as well as engaged in feuds with Cactus Jack and Stevie Richards. Marconi also had brief stints in Extreme Championship Wrestling and the World Wrestling Federation as a preliminary wrestler.

A back injury in 2000 prematurely forced Marconi into retirement. He eventually returned to pro wrestling five years later, at age 32, and performed for Absolute Intense Wrestling, International Wrestling Cartel, and G.O.U.G.E. Wrestling. Since August 2012, Marconi has competed in the National Wrestling Alliance winning titles in several NWA-affiliated promotions. He is a former NWA East Three Rivers Champion, a two-time NWA Eastern States Champion, and two-time NWA National Heavyweight Champion. His feud with Phil "Nitro" Monahan is considered by the NWA to be one of the organization's "fiercest rivalries" in recent years. In May 2014, Pro Wrestling Illustrated ranked Marconi #5 of the top ten wrestlers in the NWA.

== Early life ==
Lou Marconi was born in Brooklyn, Ohio, a suburb of Cleveland, on June 19, 1973. A lifelong wrestling fan, Marconi followed both the National Wrestling Alliance and the World Wrestling Federation during the 1980s. His favorite wrestlers were WWF stars Bret "the Hitman Hart and Mr. Perfect who later influenced his wrestling style. He began training under Charlie Fulton at the Ohio Monster Factory in Marion, Ohio, shortly after leaving high school. Marconi made his pro debut on June 19, 1993, after only two months of training.

== Professional wrestling career ==
=== Early career (1992–1994) ===
Marconi spent the first years of his wrestling career on the local Ohio-Pennsylvania independent circuit including, most notably, J.T. Lightning's Cleveland All-Pro Wrestling. Pro Wrestling Illustrated alleged that his opponents had dubbed his infamous finisher the "Hellfire lariat" because "it takes five years off your life". On May 25, 1994, Marconi appeared on WWF Superstars of Wrestling where he and Curtis Harrison wrestled The Headshrinkers (Fatu and Samu) for the WWF World Tag Team Championship. Marconi was given this early opportunity, due in large part to his trainer Charlie Fulton, and would eventually become a regular WWF preliminary wrestler for its Midwestern tours from 1996 to 2000.

=== Steel City Wrestling (1994–1996) ===
That summer, Marconi joined Steel City Wrestling based in Irwin, Pennsylvania. On September 24, 1994, he teamed with Derek Stone to defeat Beauty & The Beast (Frank Stalletto and Futureshock) in Munhall, Pennsylvania, to become the inaugural SCW Tag Team Champions. Beauty & The Beast won the belts three months later in Pittsburgh, however, Marconi soon formed Black & Blue with The Black Cat and made a second run for the tag titles. Marconi and The Black Cat defeated Beauty & The Beast for the SCW Tag Team Championship in Plum, Pennsylvania, on March 17, 1995; the two reportedly defeated Futureshock and Stalletto in singles matches during the show. The two were defeated by The Juicer and Preston Steele at Deaf Wrestlefest 1995 on April 9. After a 7-month reign, Black & Blue lost the SCW Tag Team titles to Frank Stalletto and Stevie Richards in Connellsville, Pennsylvania, on October 21. After the match, Raven and Richards attacked Stalletto and the belts were held up. On November 11, 1995, Marconi and Frank Stalletto defeated Stevie Richards and Brian Rollins in St. Mary, Pennsylvania to win the vacant SCW Tag Team Championship. On April 13, 1996, Marconi and Frank Stalletto defended the SCW Tag Team belts against Ron Cumberledge and Kenny "Hurricane" Hendrix in Barberton, Ohio. A week later, Marconi and Frank Stalletto lost the belts to Stevie Richards and The Blue Meanie at Deaf Wrestlefest 1996.

=== American States Wrestling Alliance (1996) ===
Marconi began wrestling for the American States Wrestling Alliance around this time. Shortly before Deaf Wrestlefest, Marconi took part in an 18-man battle royal for an ASWA television taping in Lexington, Ohio; he was the last participant to be eliminated by the winner Max Profit. On June 8, 1996, Marconi defeated Lumberin' Jack in Alliance, Ohio. In August, Marconi made two appearances on WWF Superstars of Wrestling; his first match was against Marc Mero and the second a tag team match with Frank Stalletto versus The Smokin' Gunns (Billy and Bart Gunn). He also wrestled "Stone Cold" Steve Austin on WWF Superstars two months later.

Marconi briefly returned to SCW in the fall. On September 21, 1996, Marconi defeated Paul Atlas at the Tuscarawas County Fair in Dover, Ohio. The following night, he lost to Stevie Richards at Sullivan Hall in Pittsburgh, Pennsylvania.

On October 18, 1996, Marconi teamed with Micro Menace and Kaos in a 6-man tag team match to defeat Bo Dacious, Chip Emdale, and The Prince of Polyester at an ASWA television taping in Mansfield, Ohio. Marconi and Chris Harris entered a championship tag team tournament and advanced to the semi-finals where, on November 22, they defeated Roger Ruffin and The Prince of Polyester at the Commerce Center in Mansfield. On December 21, 1996, Marconi and Chris Harris defeated Lumberin' Jack and Chip Endale at the Mansfield Commerce Center. At the end of the year, Marconi was one of several wrestlers featured in a Pro Wrestling Illustrated article about unusual nicknames in pro wrestling. PWI columnist Dave Rosenbaum wrote:

My least favorite nickname belongs to Lou Marconi. No, there's nothing wrong with the name Lou Marconi, until you call him "Beef Stew" Lou Marconi. For one, "Spaghetti" Lou Marconi sounds more fitting. And what's with the beef stew thing? Why would a human being want to compare himself to stew? No matter what he does, Lou Marconi is always going to be perceived as a big, fat, slow moving hunk of meat.

=== Pro Wrestling eXpress (1996–1997) ===
In late-1996, Marconi debuted in Pittsburgh's Pro Wrestling eXpress. On November 23, 1996, Marconi defeated Big Daddy Adams (substituting for The Black Cat) at the Wrestleplex in North Versailles, Pennsylvania, to win the PWX North American Championship. He subsequently aligned himself with manager Notorious Norm's heel stable. The two later became known as "The Spice Boys". On December 13, 1996, Marconi held on to his title via a disqualification loss to Paul Atlas at the Wrestleplex. A rematch the following night in Herminie, Pennsylvania, resulted in a victory for Marconi. On February 22, 1997, Marconi lost the PWX North American Championship to Dennis Gregory (substituting for J.B. Destiny) at the National Guard Armory in Punxsutawney, Pennsylvania. On March 7, 1997, Marconi joined Axl Rotten, Adam Flash, and Frank Stalletto an 8-man tag team elimination match against Stevie Richards, The Blue Meanie, J.B. Destiny, and Colonel Payne at the Wrestleplex in North Versailles. One day later, Marconi defeated "Bad Boy" Brian Anthony at North Star High School in Boswell, Pennsylvania. On April 5, 1997, Marconi returned to Punxsutawney where he defeated J.B. Destiny.

On May 9, Marconi defeated PWX Heavyweight Champion T. Rantula in a non-title "I Quit" match at the Wrestleplex. Marconi has called this match, in which he was powerbombed though the particleboard-constructed entranceway, the "craziest" of his entire career. On May 24, Marconi defeated Paul Atlas in a rematch. That same night Marconi lost to PWX Heavyweight Champion T. Rantula in a Falls Count Anywhere match in Punxsutawney. On May 30, Marconi defended his title twice in one night at the Wrestleplex defeating Paul Atlas, by disqualification, and Quinn Magnum. On May 31, Marconi and Gator battled to a double-countout at Carmichaels High School. At the end of the show, Marconi also defeated Brian Anthony. On July 28, Marconi wrestled Brian Pillman on WWF Shotgun Saturday Night. On August 27, 1997, Marconi defeated PWX North American Champion Dennis Gregory in a unification match at the Wrestleplex. That same month, Marconi made his Extreme Championship Wrestling debut against Bam Bam Bigelow before 2,200 fans at the Golden Dome in Monaca, Pennsylvania. Marconi was initially brought into ECW by The Blue Meanie and would continue to make appearances with the promotion throughout the year.

On September 21, 1997, Marconi defended the PWX Television Championship defeating Sean Evans by submission at an SCW show in Mount Washington, Pennsylvania. On October 4, 1997, Marconi lost the newly unified title to Dennis Gregory at the Wrestleplex. That weekend in ECW, Marconi wrestled Al Snow in back-to-back singles matches. On December 13, 1997, he and Bill Wiles lost to Axl Rotten and Balls Mahoney in Buffalo, New York. On January 16, 1998, Marconi lost a second tag team match with Bud Liscious to Danny Doring and Paul Diamond in Rostraver, Pennsylvania. His final ECW appearance took place the following night at the Golden Dome where Marconi wrestled Danny Doring in front of 2,300 people.

=== Steel City Wrestling (1998–1999) ===
In early-1998, Marconi returned to SCW and would hold the SCW Heavyweight, Television, and Tag Team titles within the span of a year. On February 8, Marconi and Frank Stalletto reunited to wrestle Cactus Jack & The Blue Meanie for the vacant SCW Tag Team Championship in Irwin, Pennsylvania. On March 8, Marconi wrestled SCW Junior Heavyweight Champion Reckless Youth in a Three-Way Dance with Christian York at the SCW Arena in Irwin, Pennsylvania. Although unable to capture the tag titles with Stalletto, Marconi won the belts from The Bad Street Boys (Joey Matthews and Christian York) with Dennis Gregory two months later. On May 1, Marconi also won the SCW Heavyweight Championship from Tom Brandi after outside interference from Stevie Richards. On May 23, 1998, Marconi lost to Brandi via disqualification at an MAPW/SCW show in Medina, Ohio. The next night, he defended the heavyweight title against Julio Sanchez at Ainsworth Field in Erie, Pennsylvania. On June 29, 1998, Marconi wrestled Faarooq on WWF Shotgun Saturday Night. On July 10, Marconi lost to Tom Brandi in an "I Quit" match at the SCW Arena. On August 7, Marconi wrestled Tito Santana at an International Pro Wrestling show in Steelton, Pennsylvania. Marconi and Gregory eventually had a falling out and began feuding over the Marconi's title. In September, Marconi and Stevie Richards joined forces in a tag team match against Gregory and Tom Brandi. He eventually lost the title to his former partner on November 22 after holding the title over 6 months. On December 12, 1998, Marconi was one of several wrestlers who performed for "Christmas Chaos", an interpromotional event for Allied Powers Wrestling Federation and the Pennsylvania Wrestling Alliance, held at Elk County Catholic High School in St. Mary's, Pennsylvania. Other high-profile wrestlers included Tom Brandi, Julio Sanchez, Jimmy Cicero, Demolition Ax, and Doink the Clown. A week later, Marconi defeated Don Montoya for the SCW Television Championship on December 20, 1998. He dropped it to The Blue Meanie in Weirton, West Virginia, a month later.

On February 21, 1999, Marconi and Mike Quackenbush unsuccessfully challenged SCW Tag Team Champions The Bad Street Boys at the SCW Arena. On May 15, Marconi was one of three SCW wrestlers to represent the promotion at "Break The Barrier" where he wrestled Don Montoya and Mike Quackenbush in a Three-Way Dance to crown the first-ever SCW Lord of the Dance Champion. The supercard was one of the biggest independent shows ever held in the United States with over 15 independent promotions taking part. Jay Kirell called the Lord of the Dance bout "by far the match of the night" and greatly enhanced the early career of Quackenbush. Five days later in Cambridge, Ohio, he faced T. Rantula in a street fight match with Mankind as special guest referee. On July 26, Marconi wrestled Test on WWF Shotgun Saturday Night. Marconi also wrestled Mideon on the November 22nd edition of WWF Jakked.

On January 14, 2000, Marconi and Paul Atlas won the NWA East Tag Team Championship from Kingdom James in North Versailles. James was forced to defend the belts in a handicap match when his partner Shawn Patrick did not appear at the event. The two held the tag titles for five months before losing them to James and Patrick on May 19, 2000. That same month, Marconi made one of his last appearances in SCW wrestling a Three-Way Dance with T. Rantula and Dennis Gregory in McKeesport, Pennsylvania. Marconi briefly feuded with Notorious Norm but made peace with his longtime manager before leaving the promotion.

=== Semi-retirement (2000–2005) ===
In 2000, Marconi suffered a serious back injury which kept him out of action for over five years. Although Marconi believed that his small size is what kept him from a career with a major organization such as the World Wrestling Federation, Marconi was one of the top "indy stars" in the region. Marconi, then 27-years-old at the time of his injury, spent much of the decade in intense physical therapy in an attempt to return to the ring. He also spent time developing a second career during this period. Marconi received his bachelor's degree in communications from Cleveland State University in the mid-1990s, however, he later found employment as an insurance salesman.

=== Absolute Intense Wrestling (2005–2006) ===
In the summer of 2005, Marconi made his first attempt to resume his pro wrestling career in Absolute Intense Wrestling based in Cleveland, Ohio. Marconi became the number one contender for the AIW Heavyweight Championship when he defeated Josh Prohibition at AIW's "Rude Boy Strikes" on August 21. Marconi had accepted an open challenge made by Prohibition when his scheduled opponent Colt Cabana was unable to appear. He defeated AIW Champion The Thrillbilly for the title at "Hell on Earth" on November 13. Marconi successfully defended the title against JT Lightning at "Gauntlet for the Gold 1" on December 11, 2005. He lost the belt to Vincent Nothing at "Night of Mystery" on February 26, 2006. His last appearance for AIW was at "This Is Now" on March 26 against former student Raymond Rowe which was billed as his official "retirement" match. Marconi was pinned by Rowe with a German suplex.

=== Firestorm Pro Wrestling (2009–2010) ===
After a three-year hiatus, Marconi started wrestling for Firestorm Pro Wrestling, another Cleveland-based independent promotion, in the summer of 2009. He also teamed with Frank Staletto and J. J. Dillon (with Count Grog) against Dominic DeNucci, Cody Michaels, and Shane Douglas (with Missy Hyatt) at Deaf Wrestlefest 2009. Marconi was to face M-Dogg 20 at Firestorm Pro's "War Games" on July 10, however, his opponent claimed to have an injury and instead brought out his "protege" Mathew Justice as a substitute. A rematch was scheduled between M-Dogg 20 and Marconi was similarly cancelled due to injury. On December 12, Marconi joined Frank Stalletto and Lord Zoltan (with Mayor Mystery) in a six-man tag team match against Shane Douglas and The Blue World Order (Hollywood Nova and Da Blue Guy) at "A Call To Arms 2009" for the International Wrestling Cartel in Elizabeth, Pennsylvania. At Firestorm Pro's second anniversary show "Destroy Erase Improve" on December 30, 2009, his opponent Colt Cabana was forced to pull out at the last minute due to a torn hamstring. This provoked an angry rant by Marconi who criticized younger wrestlers and issued an open challenge to the locker room. Shiima Xion came out to confront Marconi and, after a brief exchange, accepted his offer to a match. Their bout ended via disqualification when Marconi refused to release his "crossface" finisher after Xion had reached the ropes. Marconi continued to keep Xion in the hold after the match, spitting in the face of referee Mick Lovin when he tried to break them apart, until the intervention of FPW Heavyweight Champion Ray Rowe.

Marconi and Shiima Xion met again three months later at the inaugural "King of Cleveland" on March 19, 2010. Marconi pinned Xion with an O'Connor roll to earn the 30th spot in the 30-man battle royal. The final four participants - Marconi, Xion, J-Rocc, and Patrick Hayes - then wrestled in an elimination match with Marconi being pinned by Xion. The feud between Marconi and Xion continued at "Rise of the Real Underground" when Shiima Xion interfered in a match between Marconi and Tim Green, squirting hairspray in Marconi's eyes, and allowing his opponent to score an upset voctory over the veteran. Later that night, an enraged Marconi forced Firestorm Pro owner JC Koszewski to sign a Marconi vs. Xion in a Last Man Standing match at the then upcoming "Something to Die For". In their first-ever meeting, Marconi wrestled King of Cleveland winner J-Rocc at "Fallen Riders", a special memorial show for the families of bikers killed in road accidents, in Valley View, Ohio, on August 1. The Marconi-Xion feud concluded at what would be Firestorm Pro's farewell show "Forever Standing United", with the winner receiving a title shot in the main event, on September 10, 2010.

=== Independent circuit (2010–2011) ===
On May 2, 2010, Marconi and Frank Staletto (with Count Grog) lost to David Sammartino and Larry Zbyszko via disqualification at Deaf Wrestlefest 2010; Mick Foley was the special guest referee. Over the summer, Marconi defeated Ryan Mitchell in a gauntlet match also involving Dan Arkham, Will Esquire, and Frank Staletto for the NWA East Three Rivers Championship. On August 6, he entered the 3rd Annual Sean "Shocker" Evans Memorial Tournament but lost to Stryder in the opening rounds. Marconi also lost the NWA East Three Rivers title to Stryder in a Three-Way Dance with Patrick Hayes on October 23. On November 19, 2010, Marconi appeared on the Ohio Wrestling Alliance's "November Nightmare" at the Auglaize County Fairgrounds in Wapakoneta, Ohio. In the main event, Marconi faced Satan (with Disciple of Darkness) for the OWA Heavyweight Championship. The following night, Marconi made an appearance at the Pro Wrestling eXpress supercard "Do or Die 4" in McKeesport, Pennsylvania challenging Chris Taylor for the NWA East Heavyweight Championship.

On May 1, 2011, he wrestled Dennis Gregory to a 10-min. time limit draw at Deaf Wrestlefest 2011. On July 23, Marconi also performed for the 4th Annual Sean "Shocker" Evans Memorial Tournament wrestling in a 7-way elimination match with Ashton Amherst, Scottie Gash, Devin Devine, Paul Atlas, Dash Bennett, Lou Marconi, and Bigg. The winner of the match was to receive a heavyweight title shot at PWX's upcoming 17th anniversary show.

=== G.O.U.G.E. Wrestling (2011–2012) ===
Marconi eventually relocated to Eastern North Carolina to manage a sales territory for Progressive Insurance. Marconi also continued wrestling part-time for G.O.U.G.E. Wrestling in Raleigh, North Carolina, where he was managed by Count Grog. On September 8, 2011, Marconi was one of several G.O.U.G.E. stars including Andrea the Giant, Otto Schwanz, and Rob "Boogie Woogie Man" McBride to appear at the annual Rebus Works' "Food Truck Rodeo" in downtown Raleigh; Marconi wrestled Jimmy Jack Funk, Jr. at the event. On April 29, 2012, Marconi and Frank Stalletto (with Notorious Norm) defeated The Gambino Brothers (Marshall and Mickey Gambino) at Deaf Wrestlefest 2012.

In a June 2012 interview with Indy Week, Marconi endorsed G.O.U.G.E. as a "family friendly" promotion. On July 4, 2012, Marconi wrestled North Carolina Heavyweight Champion Damien Wayne at a special G.O.U.G.E. Independence Day event in Downtown Raleigh. Marconi also spent several months in Shockwave Wrestling Entertainment where he won the promotion's heavyweight title.

=== World Wrestling Entertainment (2012) ===
In November 2012, Cueball Carmichael was asked by longtime friend Manny Fernandez for assistance in finding talent to perform at upcoming World Wrestling Entertainment house shows in the Mid-Atlantic area. Marconi and Pat Cusick, both experienced and former WWF preliminary wrestlers, were handpicked by Carmichael with the possibility of WWE tryout matches. A week before their first scheduled match, the four men began preparing for the event at Fernandez' training facility in South Carolina. All four men spent considerable time away from their regular jobs and families traveling to South Carolina; it was a daily six-hour drive for Carmichael and Marconi. Each of the wrestlers submitted their paperwork to Amanda Tustian, a WWE booking executive. Although Marconi was the only wrestler not contacted by Tustian, she confirmed that Marconi was booked in a conversation with Fernandez prior to the event. On December 2, when they arrived at the first WWE event at the Greensboro Coliseum, officials were unable to find his paperwork and WWE Executive Mark Carrano ordered security to escort Marconi from the building. Carmichael alleged that Marconi was verbally abused by both Carrano and building security. Afterwards, Carmichael made a public statement criticizing WWE for the disrespectful way it had treated Marconi and declared he would have no further association with the company. Tustian later admitted to Fernandez that Marconi's paperwork had not been processed due to the Thanksgiving weekend.

=== National Wrestling Alliance (2012–present) ===
Marconi began wrestling for the National Wrestling Alliance in mid-2012 and appeared in a number of NWA-affiliated promotions including NWA East, NWA Fusion, NWA Houston, and NWA Smoky Mountain. He was selected by the NWA based on recommendations from Johnny Lightning, Cueball Carmichael and Ray Rowe. Within two years, Marconi was considered by Pro Wrestling Illustrated to be one of the top ten wrestlers in the entire NWA organization.

He lost to NWA National Heavyweight Champion Damien Wayne at an NWA Edge show on February 2, 2013. On February 16, Marconi took part in a special one-night tournament, "Battle at the Brigade", featuring "some of the most well-known wrestlers in the state". The event was held as a benefit show for the Brigade Boys and Girls Club in Wilmington, North Carolina. He also made appearances with North Carolina independents Dawg Pro Wrestling and New Skool Wrestling. Marconi was among several major challengers who failed to capture the DPW Heavyweight Championship from Damien Wayne. A month later in NWA Edge, Marconi teamed with Justin Kaos to defeat C-Block and Krotch. That summer, Marconi won the vacant NWA Eastern States Championship. On August 2, Marconi wrestled Seymour Snott at "Armbar on Autism", a fundraising event to raise awareness about autism, in Greensboro, North Carolina. Two weeks later, he lost to Chris Taylor in the opening rounds of the 6th Annual Sean "Shocker" Evans Memorial Tournament.

On October 18, 2013, Marconi wrestled his former student Raymond Rowe in the opening match of "NWA Invasion" held at the Humble Civic Center Arena in Houston, Texas. Marconi ended up pinning Rowe with his "Death Sentence" finisher, after outside interference from suspended wrestler Jasper Davis, and retained the NWA Eastern States Championship. A month later, Marconi faced Deimos at WrestleCade 2013 in Winston-Salem, North Carolina.

==== Feud with Phil "Nitro" Monahan ====
In December 2013, a title defence against The Human Predator went awry when NWA National Heavyweight Champion Phil "Nitro" Monahan interfered in the match allowing Marconi's opponent to win the NWA Eastern States Championship. On January 18, 2014, Marconi wrestled on NWA Rage's debut show, "NWA Rage Invades Williamston", where he regained the NWA Eastern States Championship from The Human Predator. On February 15, Marconi lost the belt to Gideon Malice in Toledo, Ohio, when Monahan once again interfered in a title match. Weeks later, Marconi gained revenge on Monahan by defeating him for the NWA National Heavyweight Championship in Williamston on March 1, 2014, ending Monahan's six-month title reign. Marconi successfully defended the title in NWA Smokey Mountain against Lance Erikson on March 7, in Church Hill, Tennessee. That same month, Marconi was interviewed by Dr. Jerry Wiseman on the WrestleStuff Radio podcast and discussed his career and feud with Monahan. Marconi was invited back to WrestleStuff Radio the following week joining Phil Monahan in an on-air interview.

The two men wrestled each other throughout the U.S., including memorable bouts in North Carolina and Indiana, and eventually met in Monahan's hometown of Waldron, Michigan. On March 22, Marconi dropped the title to Monahan at "Wrestlerama 13", an NWA Championship International Wrestling supercard, at the Jesse Phillips Arena in Hillsdale, Michigan. Marconi regained the belt less than 24 hours later in Oregon, Ohio, however, he lost it to Monahan in Carolina Beach, North Carolina, on April 5. The bout reportedly turned into a wild brawl that included "a frenzy of trash cans, steel chairs to the head, and even a crutch from an injured U.S. Marine" before Monohan was able to pin Marconi using a steel chair.

A rematch was quickly set up on April 19 at an NWA Championship International Wrestling in Toledo, Ohio. Marconi took to his official Facebook account vowing to end Monahan's career. He taunted his opponent by leaving messages counting down the days until "Nitro's last match." On May 10, 2014, Marconi wrestled Seymour Snott at a Carolina Wrestling Showcase event in Asheboro, North Carolina.

== Personal life ==
In July 2016, Marconi was named part of a class action lawsuit filed against WWE which alleged that wrestlers incurred traumatic brain injuries during their tenure and that the company concealed the risks of injury. The suit was litigated by attorney Konstantine Kyros, who has been involved in a number of other lawsuits against WWE. In September 2018, the lawsuit was dismissed by US District Judge Vanessa Lynne Bryant.

Lou is now married with two daughters and lives in Geauga County, Ohio.

== Filmography ==
Year	Title	Role	Notes
2011	Everyone Wants Her Dead	Zombie	Short film

== Championships and accomplishments ==
- Absolute Intense Wrestling
  - AIW Absolute Championship (1 time)
- American Commonwealth Wrestling
  - ACW Mid-American Championship (1 time)
- Carolina Wrestling Showcase
  - CWS Legacy Championship (1 time)
- G.O.U.G.E. Wrestling
  - GOUGE Heavyweight Championship (1 time)
- International Wrestling Alliance
  - IWA Television Championship (1 time)
- National Wrestling Alliance
  - NWA National Heavyweight Championship (3 times)
- Mid-Atlantic Championship Wrestling
  - MACW Heavyweight Championship (2 times)
- Ohio Championship Wrestling
  - OCW Tag Team Championship (2 times) – with Derek Stone and Frank Stalletto
- Pro Wrestling eXpress
  - PWX Heavyweight Championship (1 time)
  - PWX North American Heavyweight Championship (2 times)
  - PWX Television Championship (1 time)
  - PWX Three Rivers Championship (1 time)
  - PWX Tag Team Championship (1 time) – with Paul Atlas
- Pro Wrestling Illustrated
  - PWI ranked Lou Marconi # 213 of the 500 best singles wrestlers of the PWI 500 in 1998
- Shockwave Wrestling Entertainment
  - SWE Heavyweight Championship (1 time)
- Steel City Wrestling
  - SCW Heavyweight Championship (1 time)
  - SCW Television Championship (2 times)
  - SCW Tag Team Championship (4 times) – with The Black Cat (1), Derek Stone (1), Dennis Gregory (1), and Frank Stalletto (1)
