= David Sammartino =

American personal trainer and wrestler (born 1960)

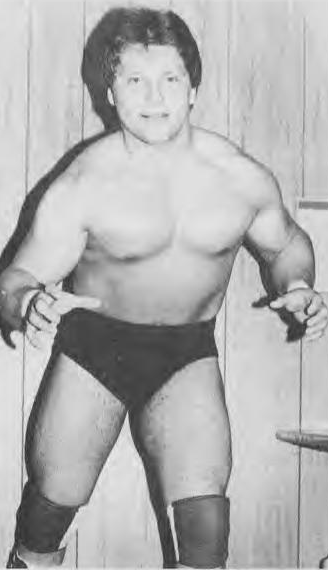
- Sammartino, circa 1985

Personal information
- Born: David Lugogo Sammartino; September 29, 1960 (age 65) Pittsburgh, Pennsylvania, U.S.
- Family: Bruno Sammartino (father)

Professional wrestling career
- Ring name(s): Bruno Sammartino, Jr. David Lugogo; David Sammartino; Dave Sammartino; David Bruno Sammartino; The Unknown Soldier
- Billed height: 5 ft 8 in (1.73 m)
- Billed weight: 252 lb (114 kg)
- Billed from: Pittsburgh, Pennsylvania
- Trained by: Bruno Sammartino
- Debut: 1980
- Retired: 2010

David Lugogo Sammartino (born September 29, 1960) is an American personal trainer and retired professional wrestler. He is the son of former WWWF/WWF World Heavyweight Champion, Bruno Sammartino.

== Professional wrestling career ==
=== Early career (1980–1984) ===
Bruno was against David going into professional wrestling, as he did not want him to experience the various horrors he went through when he started. He wanted David to get a college education and pursue a different career. Going against his father's advice, David headed south and began training and wrestling with a few smaller independent wrestling companies, making his debut as a 20-year-old in 1980. In 1981, Sammartino wrestled for Georgia Championship Wrestling. Throughout 1981, Sammartino picked up where his father left off the year before, feuding with Bruno's former protégé, Larry Zbyszko.

=== World Wrestling Federation (1984–1985) ===
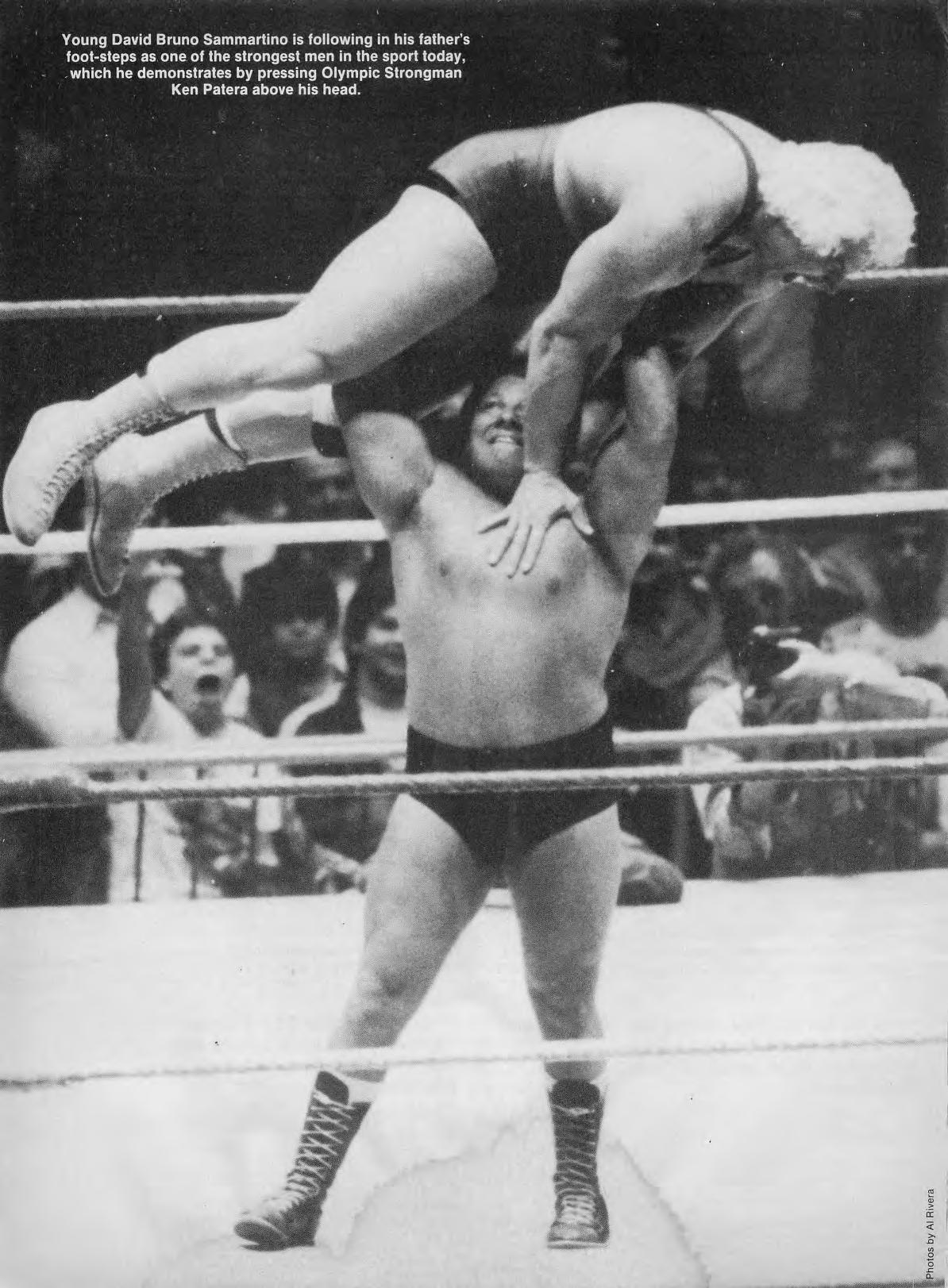
Sammartino (bottom) lifts Ken Patera (top) with a gorilla press, circa 1985

Sammartino joined the World Wrestling Federation (WWF) in September 1984, with his father as his manager. He received a big push while teaming with his father, he was also pushed in singles matches. He appeared at the inaugural WrestleMania event at Madison Square Garden in New York City in 1985. Accompanied by Bruno, Sammartino wrestled Brutus Beefcake as part of the undercard. The match ended in a double disqualification after Sammartino was thrown out of the ring by Beefcake and slammed by Beefcake's manager Johnny Valiant, prompting Bruno Sammartino to assault Valiant. This led to a series of tag team matches that brought Bruno out of retirement in an effort to advance David's career. If Bruno was involved, David was often in the main event or a high-profile match; on his own, David wrestled preliminary matches.

In one of his final WWF appearances, Sammartino was involved in a controversial finish at the Philadelphia Spectrum on November 22, 1985, quickly submitting to a bear hug by jobber Ron Shaw.

=== Various promotions (1986–1991) ===
In 1986, Sammartino left the WWF and joined the American Wrestling Association (AWA). He had three championship matches against AWA World Champion Stan Hansen. On February 4, 1986 in Salt Lake City, Utah, Sammartino unsuccessfully challenged Hansen for the championship.

Sammartino left the AWA after just a few months and returned to the WWF, where he was once again used as a preliminary wrestler. Sammartino's second run ended in 1988 when he was fired from the WWF after he was arrested for punching a fan who spat at him in Watertown, New York.

In 1990, Sammartino began wrestling for Herb Abrams' Universal Wrestling Federation in California. David also competed for All Japan Pro Wrestling (AJPW) in 1988, before leaving the company in 1990. Sammartino occasionally teamed with Joe Malenko in AJPW. He retired in 1991.

=== NWA Jersey (1995) ===
Sammartino returned to wrestling in 1995 and competed for NWA New Jersey, where he unsuccessfully challenged Tommy Cairo for the NWA North American Championship twice. Sammartino left the promotion shortly thereafter.

=== World Championship Wrestling (1996) ===
Sammartino re-emerged in 1996 in World Championship Wrestling (WCW), competing in the promotion's cruiserweight division. Sammartino was only used in two matches in WCW. On the December 16, 1996 episode of WCW Monday Nitro, Sammartino challenged Dean Malenko for the WCW Cruiserweight Championship, but was defeated. The other match was a dark match, defeating preliminary wrestler, Rex King. After leaving WCW, Sammartino took another hiatus from wrestling.

=== Later career (2000–2010) ===
In 2000, Sammartino defeated Jimmy Cicero to win the New York State Wrestling Federation Heavyweight Championship in New Rochelle, New York.

In 2010, Sammartino appeared at an International Wrestling Cartel event called "IWC Night of legends" defeating Larry Zbyszko. In June 2010, Sammartino teamed with Zbyzsko against Frank Stalletto and Lou Marconi at Deaf Wrestlefest 2010 in a winning effort.

== Personal life ==
Sammartino is retired from wrestling and has worked as a personal trainer since 1996. He had a strained relationship with his father Bruno, and didn't attend his funeral.

== Championships and accomplishments ==
- North American Wrestling
  - NAW Heavyweight Championship (1 time)
- Pro Wrestling Illustrated
  - PWI Rookie of the Year (1981)
  - PWI ranked him No. 480 of the 500 best singles wrestlers of the "PWI Years" in 2003
- Southern Championship Wrestling
  - SCW Heavyweight Championship (1 time)
