= SCW Junior Heavyweight Championship (Steel City Wrestling) =

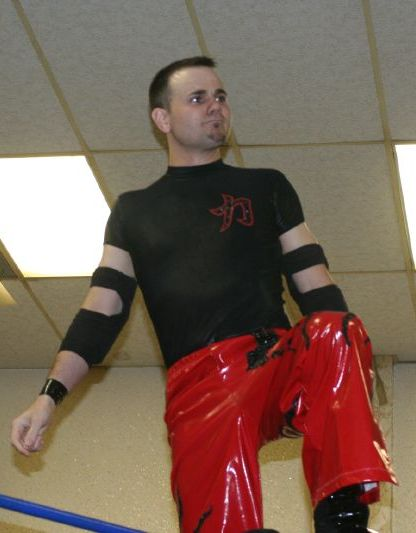
- Mike Quackenbush was the final SCW Junior Heavyweight Champion

Details
- Promotion: Steel City Wrestling
- Date established: October 8, 1994
- Date retired: 2000

Other name(s)
- SCW Light Heavyweight Championship
Statistics
- First champion(s): Lord Zoltan
- Final champion(s): Mike Quackenbush
- Longest reign: Lord Zoltan (1,219)
- Shortest reign: Reckless Youth (56)
- Oldest champion: Lord Zoltan (36 years, 357 days)
- Youngest champion: Christian York (21 years, 6 days)
- Heaviest champion: Lord Zoltan (230 lb (100 kg))
- Lightest champion: Reckless Youth (183 lb (83 kg))

The SCW Junior Heavyweight Championship was a professional wrestling championship in Steel City Wrestling (SCW). The title was the top junior heavyweight championship of the SCW promotion. It was the second singles championship established in SCW, having been introduced in 1994, in the finals of a four-man tournament.

The inaugural champion was Lord Zoltan, who defeated Scotty McKeever in a tournament final on October 8, 1994 to become the first SCW Junior Heavyweight Champion. No wrestler held the title more than once. At 1,219 days, Zoltan's first and only reign is the longest in the title's history. Reckless Youth's reign was the shortest in the history of the title at 56 days. Overall, there have been 4 reigns shared between 4 wrestlers, with one vacancy, and 1 deactivation.

== Title history ==
Key

#	Order in reign history
Reign	The reign number for the specific wrestler listed
Location	The city in which the title was won
Event	The event in which the title was won
—	Used for vacated reigns so as not to count it as an official reign
N/A	The information is not available or is unknown

No.	Champion	Reign	Date	Days held	Location	Event	Notes	Ref(s).
1	Lord Zoltan	1	October 8, 1994	1,219	Connellsville, Pennsylvania	Live event	Zoltan defeated Scotty McKeever in a tournament final to become the first SCW Junior Heavyweight Champion.	
2	Reckless Youth	1	February 8, 1998	56	Irwin, Pennsylvania	Live event		
—	Vacated	—	April 19, 1998	—	N/A	N/A	The championship was vacated when Reckless Youth was unable to defend the title due to injury.	
3	Christian York	1	April 19, 1998	103	Latrobe, Pennsylvania	Live event	This was a four way dance also involving Lou Marconi, Joey Matthews and Mike Quackenbush.	
4	Mike Quackenbush	1	July 31, 1998	N/A	Irwin, Pennsylvania	Live event	This was a three way dance also involving Reckless Youth.	
—	Deactivated	—	2000	—	N/A	N/A	SCW closed during the summer of 2000, and the championship was retired.	

== List of combined reigns ==
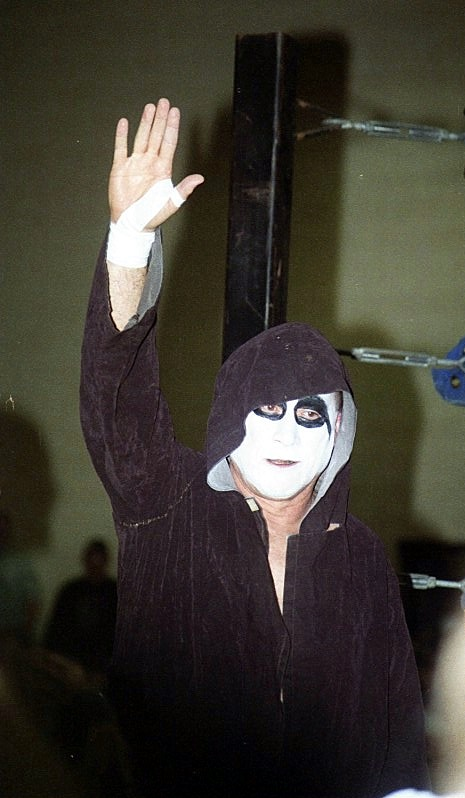
Lord Zoltan, who was the first and longest-reigning SCW Junior Heavyweight Champion

Rank	Wrestler	No. of reigns	Combined days	Ref(s).
1	Lord Zoltan	1	1,219	
2	Mike Quackenbush	1	159+	
3	Christian York	1	103	
4	Reckless Youth	1	56	
