= Blue World Order =

Professional wrestling stable

- Blue World Order logo

Stable
- Members: See below
- Name(s): Blue World Order bWo bW 2.0
- Billed from: Philadelphia, Pennsylvania
- Debut: November 16, 1996
- Disbanded: 2017
- Years active: 1996–1998; 2005; 2008–2017

The Blue World Order (bWo) was a stable of professional wrestlers formed at Extreme Championship Wrestling's November to Remember 1996 event. The stable lasted until August 1998 and was revived briefly in World Wrestling Entertainment during the summer of 2005. From 2008 through 2017, the group made several appearances at various local independent events and in Total Nonstop Action Wrestling as bW 2.0.

== History ==
=== Extreme Championship Wrestling (1996–1998) ===
Since July 1996, Stevie Richards and The Blue Meanie had been making parodies of various wrestlers from the World Wrestling Federation (WWF) and World Championship Wrestling (WCW). In early 1996 Raven was forming a stable called Raven's Nest and was gathering new members. He called upon Stevie and Meanie along with an independent performer from New Jersey, Nova. These three would often come to the ring together before Raven made his entrance, imitating rock bands or pop culture references, most notably The Jackson 5 and at The Doctor Is In in August 1996 as the rock band Kiss. The latter received a great ovation from the ECW fans before The Sandman abruptly entered the ring and caned them. Backstage after the event, Bubba Ray Dudley told them how great it was and the only thing greater would be a parody of the nWo. After clearing things with Paul Heyman and Raven, it was decided that they would form the bWo at the next big event, November to Remember '96. Over the next few months, members were added and members left just like the group they were imitating. Initially meant to be a one-off parody, the Blue World Order became immensely popular and elevated Richards to the main event level in ECW.

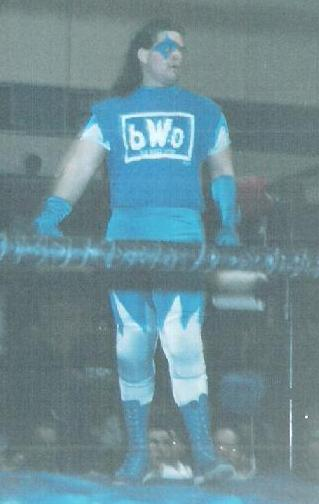
Hollywood Nova

The height of the bWo's success came at the first ECW pay per view, Barely Legal. The event saw the debut of bWo Japan (with members Taka Michinoku, Terry Boy, and Dick Togo), and Big Stevie Cool was part of the 3-Way Dance main event for the #1 contendership for the ECW World Title. Just weeks after this event Richards suffered a severe injury to his neck courtesy of Terry Funk and a metal guardrail which left him temporarily paralyzed for over an hour. In July 1997, Nova had a match against Taz in which Taz vowed to kill the bWo. He squashed Nova, and although Meanie and Nova continued to tag over the next few months, the bWo was indeed dead in November 1998.

=== World Wrestling Entertainment (2005) ===
The bWo reunited in 2005 at WWE's ECW reunion show, ECW One Night Stand, coming to the ring before the Dudley Boyz versus Tommy Dreamer and The Sandman match. During their entrance, Joey Styles (laughing hysterically once they entered) said that "If any gimmick never deserved to make a dime and made a boatload of cash, this is it! And the best part is that they (WCW) couldn't sue us, 'cause it's a parody!"

On the July 7, 2005 episode of SmackDown!, the bWo reunited once again, this time to confront JBL. During the group brawl at the end of ECW One Night Stand, JBL sought out The Blue Meanie and legitimately assaulted him after Meanie called him a "backstage bully". The attack by JBL caused Meanie to tear some recent stitches and bleed. JBL then taunted the bWo and called Meanie a "fat little bitch". This led to a Meanie versus JBL no-disqualification match. Richards delivered a stiff chairshot to JBL during the match that busted him open. The Blue Meanie won the match after he hit his finisher, the Meaniesault, and Batista ran in and gave a spinebuster to JBL and threw an out-of-it Meanie on top of JBL.

Later, the bWo challenged The Mexicools to a match at The Great American Bash, with Stevie Richards saying the bWo was tired of the Mexicools interfering in people's matches, saying they were going to take over and rise up against the gringos because "We invented that!" - which then prompted Hollywood Nova to say "Actually, we never said we were going to rise up against the gringos". The three members appeared on WWE Velocity in a six-man tag match against 3 jobbers to prepare themselves for their tag match against the Mexicools. At The Great American Bash, the bWo and Mexicools met in a six-man tag match. They even drove into the ring on tricycles to parody the Mexicools' usual ring entrance on John Deere lawnmowers. The bWo lost the match after Super Crazy hit a moonsault and Psicosis hit the guillotine legdrop on Big Stevie Cool for the win. As the month of July ended, the bWo faded from the scene. Stevie Richards went back to his old gimmick, as did Hollywood Nova, while Blue Meanie was never officially contracted by WWE.

=== Sporadic reunions (2008–2010, 2015, 2017) ===
There were some bWo reunions in later years in different independents. When Richards went to TNA, Bucci and Heffron took part in a couple of shows.

On April 18, 2009, Nova and Blue Meanie unsuccessfully challenged for the British promotion One Pro Wrestling tag-team titles, losing to Project Ego (Kris Travis and Martin Kirby). That was Bucci's first in-ring performance in nearly 3 years.

On June 27, 2009, they appeared with many other former ECW talent at the Francine Fournier-run benefit show entitled Legends of The Arena. The event took place at the original ECW Arena in South Philadelphia as a benefit for deceased members of Francine's family; a portion of the ticket sales went to The American Cancer Society. bWo defeated the team of Little Guido and Big Sal, The Full Blooded Italians.

On December 12, 2009, Nova and Meanie took part in the International Wrestling Cartel show Full Circle in Elizabeth, Pennsylvania. They united with Shane Douglas and defeated local stars Frank Stalletto, Lord Zoltan and Lou Marconi.

On August 8, 2010, the bWo reunited on the TNA Hardcore Justice pay-per-view event. Heffron couldn't attend the show due to personal responsibilities to take care of in Philadelphia prior to going on his vacation the next day; still, his promo was aired on PPV and in the arena he was replaced by Big Tilly. Steve Richards, accompanied by Nova and Tilly, defeated Peter Polaco and later in the night Tilly and Nova attacked Tommy Dreamer during his match with Raven.

On June 29, 2015, the Chikara promotion announced that Big Stevie Cool, Da Blue Guy and Hollywood Nova would be reuniting as the Blue World Order for the 2015 King of Trios tournament. They were eliminated from the tournament in their first round match on September 4 by the Devastation Corporation (Blaster McMassive, Flex Rumblecrunch and Max Smashmaster).

On March 30, 2017, the bWo made a one-night reunion at WrestleCon in a six-man tag team match, defeating the team of Kevin Matthews, Mario Bokara and Pat Buck.

== Members ==
- Da Blue Guy: parody of "The Bad Guy" Scott Hall (portrayed by The Blue Meanie)
- Big Stevie Cool: parody of "Big Daddy Cool" Kevin Nash (portrayed by Stevie Richards)
- Hollywood Nova: parody of Hollywood Hogan (portrayed by Nova)
- Thomas "The Inchworm" Rodman: parody of "The Worm" Dennis Rodman (portrayed by Thomas Harris)
- 7-11 (also known as 3 ½): parody of Syxx (portrayed by Rob Feinstein)
- Stink: parody of Sting (portrayed by Corporal Punishment)
- Chastity: valet of the bWo
- Lori Fullington: valet of the bWo
- Tyler Fullington: associate of the bWo (real-life son of Lori Fullington)
- bWo Japan: parody of nWo Japan (composed of Taka Michinoku, Terry Boy, and Dick Togo)
- The Blue Tilly: parody of "The Bad Guy" Scott Hall (replaced The Blue Meanie at TNA Hardcore Justice 2010; portrayed by Big Tilly)

== Championships and accomplishments ==
- Freedom Pro Wrestling
  - FPW Tag Team Championship (1 time) – Stevie Richards and The Blue Meanie
- Pro Wrestling eXpress
  - PWX Tag Team Championship (1 time) – Stevie Richards and The Blue Meanie
