= PWX Tag Team Championship =

Professional wrestling tag team championship

Details
- Promotion: Pro Wrestling eXpress
- Date established: January 6, 1996
- Current champions: Lewis and Toryn Flight
- Date won: June 17, 2017

Other names
- NWA East / Pro Wrestling eXpress Tag Team Championship (2001–2006); AWC Tag Team Championship (2007); NWA East / Pro Wrestling eXpress Tag Team Championship (2007–2012)
Statistics
- First champions: Sean "Shocker" Evans and Vince Charming
- Most reigns: (as team) The Enforcers (3 reigns); Da Munchies (3 reigns); The Premiere Players (3 reigns); The Wrong Crowd (3 reigns) (as individual) Paul Atlas (7 reigns); Gator (7 reigns)
- Longest reign: The Order of Total Oblivion (385 days)
- Shortest reign: Mr. Bigg and Jimmy Anjel (<1 day)

The PWX Tag Team Championship is a professional wrestling Tag Team championship in Pro Wrestling eXpress (PWX). Introduced in 1996, it was PWX's original tag team title, and third tag team title overall. It was unified with the NWA East and PWL Tag Team Championships, which PWX recognized as the "NWA East / PWX Tag Team Championship". The title reverted to its original name when PWX left the National Wrestling Alliance in 2012.

Some reigns were held by champions using a ring name, while others used their real name. There have been a total of 70 recognized teams and 164 recognized individual champions, who have had a combined 90 official reigns. The first champions were Sean "Shocker" Evans and Vince Charming who defeated The Wrong Crowd (Brian Anthony and Paul Atlas) in a tournament final held at the Eastland Mall.

Four teams - The Enforcers (Crusher Hansen and Maxx Daniels), Da Munchies (Dick Trimmins and 2 Kool Abdul), The Premiere Players (Dash Bennett and Daron Smythe) and The Wrong Crowd (Brian Anthony and Paul Atlas) - are tied for the record of most reigns, with three each. Paul Atlas and Gator have the most individual reigns with seven each. Only one tag team has held the titles for 365 or more days: The Order of Total Oblivion (Shirley Doe and Apollyon), whose second reign set the record at 385 days. The Wrong Crowd is the team with the longest combined reign at 455 days, while Paul Atlas has the longest combined reign as an individual at 900 days.

The following is a chronological list of teams that have been PWX Tag Team Champions by ring name.

== Title history ==
=== Names ===
Name	Years
PWX Tag Team Championship	January 8, 1996 – June 23, 2001
NWA East / Pro Wrestling eXpress Tag Team Championship	June 23, 2001 – December 30, 2006
AWC Tag Team Championship	April 21, 2007 – November 17, 2007
NWA East / Pro Wrestling eXpress Tag Team Championship	November 17, 2007 – July 2012
PWX Tag Team Championship	July 2012 – present

=== Reigns ===
#	Wrestlers	Reigns	Date	Days held	Location	Event	Notes	Ref.
1	Sean Evans and Vince Charming	1	January 6, 1996	42	North Versailles, Pennsylvania	House show	Defeated The Wrong Crowd (Brian Anthony and Paul Atlas) in a tournament final.	^{[G]}
2	The Wrong Crowd (Brian Anthony and Paul Atlas)	1	February 17, 1996	98	North Versailles, Pennsylvania	House show		^{[G]}
3	J.B. Destiny and Ron Williams	1	May 25, 1996	56	North Versailles, Pennsylvania	House show	Defeated Brian Anthony and Bone Crusher who was substituting for Paul Atlas due to injury.	^{[G]}
4	Paul Atlas (2) and Black Cat	1	July 20, 1996	69	North Versailles, Pennsylvania	House show	Defeated J.B. Destiny and Bubba The Bulldog who was substituting for Ron Williams.	^{[G]}
5	The Giant Hillbillies (Gator and Country Boy Chris)	1	September 27, 1996	77	North Versailles, Pennsylvania	House show		^{[G]}
6	The Insiders (Big Stevie Cool and Da Blue Guy)	1	December 13, 1996	1	North Versailles, Pennsylvania	House show		^{[G]}
7	The Usual Suspects (J.B. Destiny (2) and Dennis Gregory)	1	December 14, 1996	90	Herminie, Pennsylvania	House show		^{[G]}
8	Stix & Stones (Bone Crusher and Quinn Magnum)	1	March 14, 1997	14	Carmichaels, Pennsylvania	House show		^{[G]}
9	Gator (2) and Colonel Payne	1	March 28, 1997	239	North Versailles, Pennsylvania	House show		^{[G]}
10	The Wrong Crowd (Brian Anthony and Paul Atlas (3))	2	November 22, 1997	153	North Versailles, Pennsylvania	House show		^{[G]}
11	Gator (3) and Colonel Payne (2)	2	April 24, 1998	21	North Versailles, Pennsylvania	House show		^{[G]}
12	Mr. Bigg and Jimmy Anjel	1	May 15, 1998	1	North Versailles, Pennsylvania	House show		^{[G]}
—	Vacated	—	May 16, 1998	—	North Versailles, Pennsylvania	House show	Stripped for unknown reasons.	^{[G]}
13	The Bomb Squad (Colonel Payne (3) and Bone Crusher (2))	1	May 16, 1998	40	North Versailles, Pennsylvania	House show	Awarded the vacant title.	^{[G]}
14	Robert Gibson and Vince Kaplack	1	June 25, 1998	1	North Versailles, Pennsylvania	House show		^{[G]}
15	The Wrong Crowd (Brian Anthony and Paul Atlas (4))	3	June 26, 1998	204	North Versailles, Pennsylvania	House show		^{[G]}
16	Quinn Magnum (2) and T. Rantula/Mad Mike	1	January 16, 1999	69/29	North Versailles, Pennsylvania	House show	T. Rantula left NWA East / PWX on March 26, 1999. Magnum chose Mad Mike as his replacement partner.	^{[G]}
17	987 (Colonel Payne (4) and J.B. Destiny (3))	1	April 24, 1999	54	North Versailles, Pennsylvania	House show		^{[G]}
18	The Kaplacks (Vince Kaplack (2) and Brandon K)	1	June 17, 1999	142	North Versailles, Pennsylvania	House show		^{[G]}
19	Unstoppable (Bigg (2) and Kingdom James)	1	November 6, 1999	69	Johnstown, Pennsylvania	House show	Defeated Brandon K and Cory Kaplack who was substituting for Vince Kaplack due to injury.	^{[G]}
20	Lou Marconi and Paul Atlas (5)	1	January 14, 2000	126	North Versailles, Pennsylvania	House show	Bigg failed to appear at the event, resulting in a handicap match.	
21	Kingdom James and Shawn Patrick	1	May 19, 2000	70	North Versailles, Pennsylvania	House show		
22	Armageddon (Rapture and Revelation)	1	July 28, 2000	70	North Versailles, Pennsylvania	House show	Defeated Shawn Patrick and Orion who was substituting for Kingdom James.	
—	Vacated	—	October 6, 2000	—	McKeesport, Pennsylvania	House show	Vacated when Armageddon are defeated by Double Jeopardy (Paul Atlas and Jimmy Anjel) during a tag team tournament. The winners of the tournament were awarded the title.	
23	987 (J.B. Destiny (4) and Gator (4))	1	October 6, 2000	9	McKeesport, Pennsylvania	House show	Defeated Double Jeopardy (Paul Atlas and Jimmy Anjel) in a tournament final.	
24	Double Jeopardy (Paul Atlas (6) and Jimmy Anjel (2))	1	October 15, 2000	250	Nashville, Tennessee	NWA 52nd Anniversary Show	Defeated Gator and Brandon K, substituting for J.B. Destiny who was unable to appear due to travel problems.	
—	Vacated	—	June 23, 2001	—	—	—	Vacated for a unification tournament.	
25	The Mon Valley Monsters (Cory K and Big Poppa Gator (5))	1	June 23, 2001	28	McKeesport, Pennsylvania	House show	Defeated Armageddon (Rapture and Revelation) in a tournament final to unify the NWA East, PWX, and PWL Tag Team Championships.	
26	Boomer Payne (5) and Quinn Magnum (3)	1	July 21, 2001	28	McKeesport, Pennsylvania	House show	Boomer Payne defeated Cory K in a singles match. Subsequently, Payne chose Quinn Magnum as his partner.	
27	Tommy Brown and J-Ru	1	August 18, 2001	49	McKeesport, Pennsylvania	House show	Defeated Boomer Payne in a handicap match.	
28	The New Age Horsemen (Paul Atlas (7) and Jimmy Anjel (3))	1	October 6, 2001	70	McKeesport, Pennsylvania	House show	Defeated J-Ru and Dash Bennett, substituting for Tommy Brown.	
29	Axl Law and Scott Venom	1	December 15, 2001	18	McKeesport, Pennsylvania	House show		
30	Bison and Rapture	1	January 2, 2002	87	McKeesport, Pennsylvania	House show	On March 2, 2002, Bison and Rapture defeated The New Era Horsemen (Daron Smythe & Jimmy Anjel) in McKeesport to unify the NWA East / PWX and NLW Tag Team Championships.	
31	The Premiere Players (Dash Bennett and Daron Smythe)	1	March 20, 2002	37	McKeesport, Pennsylvania	House show		
32	Mad Mike (2) and Sterling James Keenan	1	April 26, 2002	28	McKeesport, Pennsylvania	House show		
33	The Premiere Players (Dash Bennett and Daron Smythe)	2	May 24, 2002	56	McKeesport, Pennsylvania	House show	This was a "winner takes all" six-man elimination match between The Premiere Players and Paul Atlas versus Brandon K, Mad Mike and Sterling James Keenan. Due to the pre-match stipulation, The Premiere Players were awarded the tag team title while Atlas became NWA East / PWX Heavyweight Champion.	
34	Dirk Ciglar and Brandon K (2)	1	July 19, 2002	29	McKeesport, Pennsylvania	House show	This was a three-way match, also involving C.J. Sensation and Crusher Hansen.	
35	The Premiere Players (Dash Bennett and Daron Smythe)	3	August 17, 2002	182	Triadelphia, West Virginia	House show	Defeated Dirk Ciglar and Bigg, substituting for Brandon K due to injury.	
36	Rated X (Lance Dayton and Christopher Taylor)	1	February 15, 2003	196	McKeesport, Pennsylvania	House show	This was a 5 minute challenge match.	
37	Scott Venom (2) and J.B. Destiny (5)	1	August 30, 2003	14	McKeesport, Pennsylvania	House show		
38	Scottie Gash and Quinn Magnum (4)	1	September 13, 2003	140	McKeesport, Pennsylvania	House show		
39	The Program (Bigg (3) and Kid Cupid)	1	January 31, 2004	140	McKeesport, Pennsylvania	House show		
40	Better Than You (All Business Brant and Scott Venom (3))	1	June 19, 2004	56	McKeesport, Pennsylvania	House show		
41	Da Munchies (Dick Trimmins and Shiek Abdul Hassan)	1	August 14, 2004	28	McKeesport, Pennsylvania	House show		
42	Better Than You (All Business Brant and Scott Venom (4))	2	September 11, 2004	28	McKeesport, Pennsylvania	House show		
43	The Tri-Chi Fraternity (Hammer and Blitzz)	1	October 9, 2004	119	McKeesport, Pennsylvania	House show		
44	Da Munchies (Dick Trimmins and Shiek Abdul Hassan)	2	February 5, 2005	224	McKeesport, Pennsylvania	House show	This was a three-way elimination match, also involving Extreme (Squigg & McGrath).	
45	Rage (Quinn Magnum (5) and Brandon K (3))	1	September 17, 2005	(Note: The exact date on which the title was vacated is not known, which means their title reign lasted between 122 and 171 days.)	McKeesport, Pennsylvania	11th Anniversary Show		
—	Vacated	—	2006	—	—	—	Championship vacated for unknown reasons	
46	Devin Devine and Chris Taylor	1	February 26, 2006	27	McKeesport, Pennsylvania	House show	Defeated Nikita Allanov and Bigg in a Best of Three match series to win the vacant title.	
47	Nikita Allanov and Bigg (3)	1	March 25, 2006	50	McKeesport, Pennsylvania	House show		
48	987 (Scottie Gash (2) and Crusher Hansen)	1	May 14, 2006	104	McKeesport, Pennsylvania	House show		
49	Devil's Advocates (Devil Bhudakahn and Jake Garrett)	1	August 26, 2006	126	McKeesport, Pennsylvania	Summer Scorcher IV	This was a three-way match, also involving Da Munchies (Dick Trimmins and Shiek Abdul Hassan). Scottie Gash defended the title by himself.	
—	Vacated	—	December 30, 2006	—	McKeesport, Pennsylvania	House show	Championship vacated for unknown reasons	
50	The Straight Jacket Mafia (Sean Dahmer and Apollyon)	1	April 21, 2007	245	McKeesport, Pennsylvania	House show	This was a three-way elimination match for the vacant title, also involving James Ross & Guido Corleone and Dash Bennett & Kid Cupid.	
51	The Franchise Players (Jon Kronica and Max Alexander)	1	December 22, 2007	70	McKeesport, Pennsylvania	Christmas Chaos	This was a no-disqualification match.	
52	Iron Justice (Gregory Iron and Matthew Justice)	1	March 1, 2008	175	McKeesport, Pennsylvania	When Worlds Collide	This was a three-way match, also involving The Straight Jacket Mafia (Sean Dahmer and Apollyon).	
53	The Straight Jacket Mafia (Sean Dahmer and Apollyon)	2	August 23, 2008	14	McKeesport, Pennsylvania	Infection		
54	Patrick Hayes and Ashton Amhurst	1	September 6, 2008	116	McKeesport, Pennsylvania	No Limits 2		
—	Vacated	—	December 31, 2008	—	—	—	Stripped when Patrick Hayes refuses to appear for a title defense scheduled on January 17, 2009.	
55	The Franchise Players (Jon Kronica and Robert Beverly)	2	April 11, 2009	97	McKeesport, Pennsylvania	Burgh Brawl 13	Defeated Double Dragon (Blue Dragon I & Blue Dragon II) in a tournament final.	
56	Double Dragon (Blue Dragon I and Blue Dragon II)	1	July 17, 2009	71	McKeesport, Pennsylvania	Summer Assault 3	This was a three-way match, also involving NWA North American Champions Excellence Personified (Brandon K and Scottie Gash).	
57	Da Munchies (Dick Trimmins and 2 Kool Abdul)	3	September 26, 2009	25	McKeesport, Pennsylvania	15th Anniversary Show	This was a three-way match, also involving The Straight Jacket Mafia (Sean Dahmer and Apollyon).	
—	Vacated	—	October 21, 2009	—	—	—	The championship is vacated when Da Munchies split up.	
58	Golden Reign (Robert Parker Williams and Ryan Reign)	1	January 30, 2010	84	McKeesport, Pennsylvania	Genesis 3	This was a three-way match for the vacant title, also involving Travis Fame and Piston Wiley, and The Straight Jacket Mafia (Sean Dahmer and Apollyon).	
59	The Hellraisers (Travis Fame and Apollyon (3))	1	April 24, 2010	14	McKeesport, Pennsylvania	Crossfire 3		
60	The Mon Valley Monsters (Beast and Gator (6))	1	May 8, 2010	140	McKeesport, Pennsylvania	In Harm's Way 4: Ray Mendez Fan Appreciation Night		
61	Golden Reign (Robert Parker Williams and Ryan Reign)	2	September 25, 2010	84	McKeesport, Pennsylvania	16th Anniversary Show		
62	Excellence Personified (Brandon K (4) and Scottie Gash (3))	1	December 18, 2010	69	McKeesport, Pennsylvania	Christmas Chaos 4	This was a ladder match.	
63	The Uprising (Sean Dahmer (3) and Payton Graham)	2	February 25, 2011	85	McKeesport, Pennsylvania	February Fury 4		
64	Excellence Personified (Brandon K (5) and Scottie Gash (4))	2	May 21, 2011	105	McKeesport, Pennsylvania	Unforgiven 5	This was a three-way match, also involving Chris Taylor and Troy Lords.	
65	The Shirley Doe Experience (Shirley Doe and Apollyon (4))	1	September 3, 2011	56	McKeesport, Pennsylvania	No Limits 5		
66	The Hansen Brothers (Crusher Hansen (2) and Tony Hansen)	1	October 29, 2011	21	McKeesport, Pennsylvania	17th Anniversary Show	This was a "no rules" match.	
67	The Iron City Monsters (Beast and Gator (7))	2	November 19, 2011	147	McKeesport, Pennsylvania	Fan Appreciation Night	This was a three-way match, also involving The Shirley Doe Experience (Shirley Doe and Apollyon).	
68	The Order of Total Oblivion (Shirley Doe and Apollyon (5))	2	April 14, 2012	385	McKeesport, Pennsylvania	When Worlds Collide	Defeated Beast and Travis Fame who was substituting for Gator due to injury.	
69	The Greatest American Villains (Dash Bennett (4) and Robert Parker Williams)	1	May 4, 2013	70	McKeesport, Pennsylvania	Unforgiven		
70	The Revolution (Quinn Magnum (6) and T. Rantula (2))	1	July 13, 2013	27	McKeesport, Pennsylvania	In Harm's Way		
71	Initiative 51 (Troy Lords and A.J. Storm)	1	August 9, 2013	29	McKeesport, Pennsylvania	August Anarchy		
72	Legion (Payton Graham (2) and Deion Cruize)	1	September 7, 2013	56	McKeesport, Pennsylvania	19th Anniversary Show	This was a three-way match, also involving Revolution (Brandon K and T. Rantula).	
73	Payton Graham (3) and Ethan Wright	1	November 2, 2013	34	McKeesport, Pennsylvania	House show	Defeated Cruize and Alex Matthews after Legion split up.	
74	Shirley Doe (3) and The Fan Guy	1	December 6, 2013	29	McKeesport, Pennsylvania	Do or Die	This was a three-way match, also involving Revolution (Dean Radford and The Beast).	
75	The Revolution (Dean Radford and The Beast (3))	1	January 4, 2014	98	McKeesport, Pennsylvania	New Year's Knockout		
76	The Golden Triangle (Deion Cruize (2) and G.Q. Hayden Ferra)	1	April 12, 2014	42	McKeesport, Pennsylvania	Crossfire	The Beast was injured prior to the bout, resulting in a handicap match.	
77	The Enforcing Officials (Crusher Hansen (3) and Maxx Daniels)	1	May 24, 2014	154	McKeesport, Pennsylvania	Fallout	This was a three-way match, also involving System Elite (Edric Everhart and Tyler Cross).	
78	The Golden Triangle (Slice and Brittany Force)	1	October 25, 2014	35	McKeesport, Pennsylvania	Desperate Measures	This was a three-way match, also involving System Elite (Edric Everhart and Tyler Cross).	
79	The Enforcing Officials (Crusher Hansen (4) and Maxx Daniels)	2	November 29, 2014	105	McKeesport, Pennsylvania	20th Anniversary Show	This was a three-way match, also involving System Elite (Edric Everhart and Tyler Cross).	
80	The Hellfire Club (Beastman and Kriss Stark)	1	March 14, 2015	105	McKeesport, Pennsylvania	St. Paddy's Night of Champions		
81	Brandon K (6) and Jack Pollock	1	June 27, 2015	63	McKeesport, Pennsylvania	Ring of Fire		
82	Martial Law (Drake Braddock and Ego)	1	August 29, 2015	84	McKeesport, Pennsylvania	In Harm's Way		
83	The Enforcers (Crusher Hansen (5) and Maxx Daniels)	3	November 21, 2015	14	McKeesport, Pennsylvania	21st Anniversary Show	This was a gauntlet match, also involving Nick Nero and Ace Austin, The Hellfire Club (Shirley Doe and Beastman), and System Elite (Ty Cross & Edric Everhart).	
84	The Order (Lee Moriarty and Dirk Ciglar (2))	1	December 5, 2015	189	McKeesport, Pennsylvania	No Limits		
85	The Resurrection (Shawn Phoenix and Rev. Ron Hunt)	1	June 11, 2016	84	McKeesport, Pennsylvania	Unforgiven		
86	Justin Idol and Chris Taylor (2)	1	September 3, 2016	28	McKeesport, Pennsylvania	Challenge!		
—	Vacated	—	October 1, 2016	—	McKeesport, Pennsylvania	Stripped and Crowned	Stripped when Taylor was defeated by PWX Heavyweight Champion Brandon K in a "Stripped and Crowned" match, also involving PWX Three Rivers Champion Crusher Hansen, PWX Television Champion David Lawless, and PWX Futures Cup holder Sonny Vice.	
87	The Order (Rev. Ron Hunt (2) and Christian Black)	1	October 1, 2016	49	McKeesport, Pennsylvania	House show	This was a three-way match for the vacant title, also involving Lewis & Drake Braddock and Shirley Doe & Shawn Phoenix.	
88	Team Mega (Ashton Amherst (2) and JR Mega)	1	November 19, 2016	133	McKeesport, Pennsylvania	22nd Anniversary Show		
89	Locked & Loaded (Duke Davis and Ganon Jones, Jr.)	1	April 1, 2017	77	McKeesport, Pennsylvania	Crossfire		
90	Lewis and Toryn Flight	1	June 17, 2017	3,232+	McKeesport, Pennsylvania	In Harm's Way		

== Combined reigns ==
=== By team ===
Rank	Team	No. of reigns	Combined days
1	The Wrong Crowd (Brian Anthony and Paul Atlas)	3	455
2	The Order of Total Oblivion/The Shirley Doe Experience (Shirley Doe and Apollyon)	2	441
3	Da Munchies (Dick Trimmins and Shiek Abdul Hassan)	3	277
4	The Premiere Players (Dash Bennett and Daron Smythe)	3	275
5	The Enforcing Officials/The Enforcers (Crusher Hansen and Maxx Daniels)	3	273
6	Gator and Colonel Payne	2	260
7	The Straight Jacket Mafia (Sean Dahmer and Apollyon)	2	259
8	Double Jeopardy (Paul Atlas and Jimmy Anjel)	1	250
9	Rated X (Lance Dayton and Christopher Taylor)	1	196
10	The Order (Lee Moriarty and Dirk Ciglar)	1	189
11	The Iron City Monsters/The Mon Valley Monsters (Beast and Gator)	2	187
12	Iron Justice (Gregory Iron and Matthew Justice)	1	175
13	Excellence Personified (Brandon K and Scottie Gash)	2	174
14	Golden Reign (Robert Parker Williams and Ryan Reign)	2	168
15	The Kaplacks (Vince Kaplack and Brandon K)	1	142
16	Scottie Gash and Quinn Magnum	1	140
17	The Program (Bigg and Kid Cupid)	1	140
18	Team Mega (Ashton Amherst and JR Mega)	1	133
19	Lou Marconi and Paul Atlas	1	126
20	Devil's Advocates (Devil Bhudakahn and Jake Garrett)	1	126
21	The Tri-Chi Fraternity (Hammer and Blitzz)	1	119
22	Patrick Hayes and Ashton Amhurst	1	119
23	The Hellfire Club (Beastman and Kriss Stark)	1	105
24	987 (Scottie Gash and Crusher Hansen)	1	104
25	The Revolution (Dean Radford and The Beast)	1	98
26	The Franchise Players (Jon Kronica and Robert Beverly)	1	97
27	The Usual Suspects (J.B. Destiny and Dennis Gregory)	1	90
28	Bison and Rapture	1	87
29	The Uprising (Sean Dahmer and Payton Graham)	1	85
30	Better Than You (All Business Brant and Scott Venom)	2	84
31	Martial Law (Drake Braddock and Ego)	1	84
32	The Resurrection (Shawn Phoenix and Rev. Ron Hunt)	1	84
33	The Giant Hillbillies (Gator and Country Boy Chris)	1	77
34	Locked & Loaded (Duke Davis and Ganon Jones, Jr.)	1	77
35	Double Dragon (Blue Dragon I and Blue Dragon II)	1	71
36	Kingdom James and Shawn Patrick	1	70
37	Armageddon (Rapture and Revelation)	1	70
38	The Franchise Players (Jon Kronica and Max Alexander)	1	70
39	The Greatest American Villains (Dash Bennett and Robert Parker Williams)	1	70
40	Quinn Magnum and T. Rantula	1	69
41	Paul Atlas and Black Cat	1	69
42	Unstoppable (Bigg and Kingdom James)	1	
43	Brandon K and Jack Pollock	1	63
44	J.B. Destiny and Ron Williams	1	56
45	Legion (Payton Graham and Deion Cruize)	1	56
46	987 (Boomer Payne and J.B. Destiny)	1	54
47	Nikita Allanov and Bigg	1	50
48	Tommy Brown and J-Ru	1	49
49	The Order (Rev. Ron Hunt and Christian Black)	1	49
50	Sean Evans and Vince Charming	1	42
51	The Golden Triangle (Deion Cruize and G.Q. Hayden Ferra)	1	42
52	The Bomb Squad (Boomer Payne and Bone Crusher)	1	40
53	The Golden Triangle (Slice and Brittany Force)	1	35
54	Payton Graham and Ethan Wright	1	34
55	Lewis and Toryn Flight	1	31+
56	Dirk Ciglar and Brandon K	1	29
57	Initiative 51 (Troy Lords and A.J. Storm)	1	29
58	Shirley Doe and The Fan Guy	1	29
59	Quinn Magnum and Mad Mike	1	29
60	The Mon Valley Monsters (Cory K and Big Poppa Gator)	1	28
61	Boomer Payne and Quinn Magnum	1	28
62	Mad Mike and Sterling James Keenan	1	28
63	Justin Idol and Chris Taylor	1	28
64	Devin Devine and Chris Taylor	1	27
65	The Revolution (Quinn Magnum and T. Rantula)	1	27
66	The Hansen Brothers (Crusher Hansen and Tony Hansen)	1	21
67	Axl Law and Scott Venom	1	18
68	The Hellraisers (Travis Fame and Apollyon)	1	14
69	Scott Venom and J.B. Destiny	1	14
70	Stix & Stones (Bone Crusher and Quinn Magnum)	1	14
71	987 (J.B. Destiny and Gator)	1	9
72	Robert Gibson and Vince Kaplack	1	1
73	Mr. Bigg and Jimmy Anjel	1	1
74	The Insiders (Big Stevie Cool and Da Blue Guy)	1	1

=== By wrestler ===
Rank	Wrestler	No. of reigns	Combined days
1	Paul Atlas	7	900
2	Apollyon	3	714
3	Gator	7	561
4	Shirley Doe	2	460
5	Brian Anthony	3	455
6	Scottie Gash	4	418
7	Brandon K	6	408
8	Crusher Hansen	5	398
9	Boomer Payne	5	382
10	Dash Bennett	4	345
11	Sean Dahmer	3	344
12	Quinn Magnum	6	307
13	The Beast	3	285
14	Dick Trimmins	3	277
15	Shiek Abdul Hassan	3	277
16	Daron Smythe	3	275
17	Maxx Daniels	3	273
18	Bigg	3	260
19	Ashton Amherst	2	252
20	Jimmy Anjel	3	251
20	Chris Taylor	3	251
21	J.B. Destiny	5	223
22	Dirk Ciglar	2	218
23	Lance Dayton	1	196
24	Lee Moriarty	1	189
25	Gregory Iron	1	175
25	Matthew Justice	1	175
25	Payton Graham	3	175
26	Robert Parker Williams	3	168
27	Ryan Reign	2	168
28	Jon Kronica	2	167
29	Vince Kaplack	2	143
30	Kid Cupid	1	140
31	Kingdom James	2	139
32	JR Mega	1	133
32	Rev. Ron Hunt	1	133
33	Lou Marconi	1	126
33	Devil Bhudakahn	1	126
33	Jake Garrett	1	126
34	Hammer	1	119
34	Blitzz	1	119
35	Patrick Hayes	1	116
35	Scott Venom	1	116
36	Beastman	1	105
36	Kriss Stark	1	105
37	Dean Radford	1	98
37	Deion Cruize	2	98
38	Robert Beverly	1	97
39	T. Rantula	2	96
40	Dennis Gregory	1	90
41	Bison	1	87
41	Rapture	1	87
42	All Business Brant	2	84
42	Drake Braddock	1	84
42	Ego	1	84
42	Shawn Phoenix	1	84
43	Country Boy Chris	1	77
43	Duke Davis	1	77
43	Ganon Jones, Jr.	1	77
44	Blue Dragon I	1	71
44	Blue Dragon II	1	71
45	Shawn Patrick	1	70
45	Rapture	1	70
45	Revelation	1	70
45	Max Alexander	1	70
45	Robert Parker Williams	3	70
46	Black Cat	1	69
47	Jack Pollock	1	63
48	Mad Mike	2	57
49	Ron Williams	1	56
50	Bone Crusher	2	54
51	Nikita Allanov	1	50
52	Tommy Brown	1	49
52	J-Ru	1	49
52	Christian Black	1	49
53	Sean Evans	1	42
53	Vince Charming	1	42
53	G.Q. Hayden Ferra	1	42
54	Slice	1	35
54	Brittany Force	1	35
55	Ethan Wright	1	34
56	Lewis	1	31+
56	Toryn Flight	1	31+
57	Troy Lords	1	29
57	A.J. Storm	1	29
57	The Fan Guy	1	29
58	Cory K	1	28
58	Sterling James Keenan	1	28
58	Justin Idol	1	28
59	Devin Devine	1	27
60	Tony Hansen	1	21
61	Axl Law	1	18
62	Travis Fame	1	14
63	Robert Gibson	1	1
63	Big Stevie Cool	1	1
63	Da Blue Guy	1	1

== See also ==
- List of former championships in Pro Wrestling eXpress
