= Frank Stalletto =

American professional wrestler

Personal information
- Born: November 5 Cleveland, Ohio, U.S.

Professional wrestling career
- Ring name(s): Frank Stiletto; Frank Staletto; Frank Stalletto
- Billed height: 6 ft 2 in (1.88 m)
- Billed weight: 237 lb (108 kg)
- Billed from: Cleveland, Ohio
- Debut: December 12, 1992

Frank Stalletto (born November 5) is an American professional wrestler. He was a mainstay of the East Coast and Mid-Atlantic independent circuit for much of the 1990s and early 2000s.

One of the most popular stars of Pittsburgh's Steel City Wrestling, he had successful stints in American Commonwealth Wrestling, Cueball Carmichael's Independent Pro Wrestling Alliance and Doug Flex's International Pro Wrestling as well; he also formed notable tag teams with Adam Flash, Axl Rotten, Brick Bronsky, Stevie Richards, Futureshock, and "Beef Stew" Lou Marconi winning the SCW Tag Team Championship with the latter three.

In recent years, he has been affiliated with Marconi as part of his 216 Clique in NWA: East and in GOUGE Wrestling where he currently holds the tag team championship as one-half of Bad Romance with Mickey Gambino.

== Professional wrestling career ==
=== Early career ===
A former amateur wrestler, Frank Stiletto made his pro debut in 1992. Calling himself the "most handsome man in professional wrestling", hence his nickname "Handsome Frank", Stiletto often claimed to be a look-alike for country music star Billy Ray Cyrus. After nearly two years on the local independent circuit, he won his first major singles title in Mike Collins and Charlie Fulton's All-Star Wrestling Alliance by pinning then ASWA Light Heavyweight Champion Kid Collins at the ASWA supercard "Rumble On The River" in Belpre, Ohio, on August 12, 1994. He re-lost the title to Collins a month later at the Dallas Nightclub in Parkersburg, West Virginia. That same month, Stalletto also made his first appearance in the World Wrestling Federation, now known as WWE, as a preliminary wrestler. He wrestled Jim Neidhart at the Civic Center in Wheeling, West Virginia and, in front of 2,800 fans, Yokozuna at the Bradley Center in Milwaukee, Wisconsin; these matches later aired on WWF Superstars and WWF Wrestling Challenge respectively.

=== Steel City Wrestling (1994–1998) ===
The following month, Stiletto began wrestling for promoter Norm Connors in Steel City Wrestling where he would eventually become one of its top stars; he appeared on its first show against "Beef Stew" Lou Marconi in Connellsville, Pennsylvania on October 8, 1994. Two weeks earlier, he teamed with Futureshock as "Beauty & The Beast" to wrestle Marconi & Derek Stone in Munhall, Pennsylvania to determine the first SCW Tag Team Champions; the bout took place at a show for American Commonwealth Wrestling and the match was not billed as a title bout by the rival promotion. Despite their loss, Beauty & The Beast won the titles in Pittsburgh less than three months later. The team eventually lost the titles to Marconi and his new partner Black Cat, dubbed "Black & Blue", in Plum, Pennsylvania on March 17, 1995; the title changed hands in separate singles matches with Futureshock defeating Marconi but Stiletto losing to Black Cat. A month later, he faced Super Mario at SCW's annual Deaf Wrestlefest, a special fundraising event for the Western Pennsylvania School for the Deaf which also included independent wrestlers Demolition Ax, Lord Zoltan and T. Ranchula, World Championship Wrestling's Cactus Jack, and the World Wrestling Federation's Big Bully Busick, and would continue to perform at the shows over the next decade.

The following month, he made an appearance for Al Snow's Global Wrestling Alliance to wrestle Osamu Nishimura, during his debut tour of the United States, in Kalamazoo, Michigan on May 19, 1995. In July 1995, he teamed with longtime rival Lou Marconi in All-Star Wrestling Alliance to win the promotion's tag team titles.

Later that year, he enjoyed a brief partnership with Extreme Championship Wrestling's Stevie Richards and regained the SCW Tag Team titles from "Black & Blue" in Connellsville on October 21, however, he was attacked by Richards immediately after winning the belts. With the titles held up due to the team's breakup, Stiletto joined together with Lou Marconi to defeat Richards and Brian Rollins for the titles in St. Marys, Pennsylvania on November 11, 1995, a record third time. They dropped the titles back to Stevie Richards and The Blue Meanie at Deaf Wrestlefest 1996 on April 21, 1996.

In September 1996, he had a series of matches with Cody Michaels wrestling him in Buckhannon, West Virginia, Dover, Ohio and Mt. Washington, Pennsylvania on three consecutive nights; his second match with Michaels was an outdoor event held in the rain and attended by 4,800 fans. Stalletto and Marconi would continue battling the duo until the tag titles were declared vacant in January 1998 due to an injury suffered by Richards. Stiletto and Marconi made one last attempt to regain the titles but lost to Cactus Jack and The Blue Meanie in Irwin, Pennsylvania on February 8, 1998.

=== International Pro Wrestling (1996–1998) ===
While still in SCW, Stalletto also began feuding with Brick Bronsky in American Commonwealth Wrestling and International Pro Wrestling after Stiletto was attacked by Bronsky after being persuaded to tag with him. After Bronsky won the IPW Heavyweight Championship, Stiletto was among several independent wrestlers to challenge for the title. Despite losing the SCW Tag Team titles, Stiletto also continued to team with Lou Marconi wrestling in both Pennsylvania and Ohio, as well as becoming a top contender for the ACW Heavyweight Championship. As a singles wrestler, he continued to feud not only with Brick Bronsky in IPW but also Johnny Graham and Julio Sanchez. He and Sanchez battled at the IPW Wrestlepalooza supercard on January 11, 1997 and, on February 14, made a one-time appearance for the Century Wrestling Alliance at The Sports Palace in New Britain, Connecticut which ended in a double-countout. He also wrestled WWF legend George Steele on the second episode of IPW Power Hour TV.

=== World Wrestling Federation (1996, 1997–1998) ===
Over the summer, the two appeared on the August 25 edition of WWF Action Zone against The Smoking Gunns (Billy and Bart Gunn).

Stalletto made a return to WWF television on April 7, 1997, wrestling Vader (with manager Paul Bearer) at John E. Worthen Arena in Muncie, Indiana; the match was aired live on WWF Monday Night Raw. He continued feuding with Julio Sanchez until leaving IPW later that year.

Prior to returning independent circuit, Stalletto made two more appearances in the WWF for WWF Shotgun Saturday Night. On March 31, 1998, he and Roy Raymond wrestled L.O.D. 2000 (Hawk and Animal) (with Sunny) in Syracuse, New York and faced Vader once again at the Gund Arena in his hometown of Cleveland, Ohio; both shows were sold out.

=== Independent circuit (1998–2009) ===
Stalletto briefly returned to SCW in the summer of 1998. He was scheduled to team with Lord Zoltan against High Society (Cueball Carmichael & "Wiseguy" Jimmy Cicero) on August 28, 1998, however, he was unable to make the show. His partner attempted to take on both men by himself but the match ended in a disqualification. Two months later, he wrestled Cueball Carmichael on Steel City Wrestling TV. In December 1998, he wrestled Preston Steele (with Bobcat) at a TEAM L.A.W. show in Cleveland, Ohio.

In early 1999, Stalletto started wrestling for Cueball Carmichael's Independent Pro Wrestling Alliance. One of his earliest matches for the promotion was against Mark "the Shark" Shrader, a one-time MEWF Heavyweight Champion, in Woodbridge, Virginia on January 23, 1999; their match went for nearly 15 min. before Stalletto was pinned following a powerbomb off the top rope. Stalletto eventually reunited with his old tag team partner Lou Marconi in NWA: East and together "ran roughshod over the promotion" as one of its top stars during the mid-to late 1990s. Their partnership would form the basis of the heel stable "216 Clique" formed years later.

The International Wrestling Cartel was another promotion which Stalletto visited. On January 25, 2003, he lost to T. Rantula in a "retro" match at Northgate High School in Bellevue, Pennsylvania. On March 6, 2003, Stalletto and Marconi headlined Cleveland Championship Wrestling debut show at the UAW Hall in Brook Park, Ohio.

Stalletto made his NWA East return at its 14th Anniversary Show on September 20, 2008, with he and Lou Marconi teaming up against Lord Zoltan and a mystery partner in what was billed as a NWA East Throwback match. When Lord Zoltan resumed holding Deaf Wrestlefest for the Western Pennsylvania School for the Deaf in May 2009, he and Marconi were among those invited to participate. They were teamed with J. J. Dillon, making his first in-ring appearance since 1989, in a six-man tag team match against Dominic DeNucci, Cody Michaels and Shane Douglas (with Missy Hyatt).

He and Marconi, this time teaming with Lord Zoltan, appeared in a special "Steel City Wrestling retro match" at IWC's A Call To Arms 2009: Full Circle supercard held in the Court Time Sports Center in Elizabeth, Pennsylvania where they lost to Shane Douglas and The Blue World Order (Da Blue Guy & Hollywood Nova). The event served as a retirement event for longtime promoter Norm Connors which was attended by a number of wrestlers including A.J. Styles and The Sandman among others. Both men were acknowledged by Conners in his farewell speech to the fans.

On March 19, 2010, Stalletto and Marconi participated in Firestorm Pro Wrestling's 30-man intergender battle royal to crown the first "King of Cleveland". Other battle royal participants included Ares, J-Rocc, Shiima Xion, and M-Dogg 20.

=== GOUGE Wrestling and NWA East (2010–) ===
==== 2010 ====
In early 2010, Stalletto began wrestling semi-regularly for Count Grog's GOUGE Wrestling (Gimmicks Only Underground Grappling Entertainment) in North Carolina following its May 15 supercard Cincon De Mayhem in Stem, North Carolina where pinned "Boogie Woogie Man" Rob McBride after using brass knuckles.

A month later, Stalletto made a surprise return to NWA East as Lou Marconi announced the formation of a new "heel" stable, the 216 Clique, with his then recent proteges Dan Graham and Will Esquire at a house show on June 5. The group immediately began feuding with Mad Mike, and later, NWA East Three Rivers Champion Ryan Mitchell. At NWA East's July 16 supercard Summer Assault 4, held at Renzie Park in McKeesport, Pennsylvania, he and the rest of the 216 Clique (Lou Marconi, Frank Staletto, Will Esquire, and Dan Lennox) helped Lou Marconi defeat Mitchell in a gauntlet match to win the NWA East Three Rivers Championship. Stalletto formed a short-lived tag team with stablemate Dan Arkham but at Infection 3 on August 20, lost a three-way match to JB Destiny & Paul Atlas costing them a title shot the NWA East Tag Team Championship with the team breaking up shortly thereafter. He formed a more successful pairing with Shirley Doe with whom he scored a victory over Mad Mike & Ryan Mitchell the next month at No Limits 4. The match was originally scheduled as a singles match between Shirley Doe and Mad Mike, however, it turned into an impromptu tag team match when Mad Mike and Ryan Mitchell began attacking Doe and Stalletto came to help on his behalf. That same month at GOUGE's Too Hot to Handle, he lost Otto Schwanz.

On October 9, at Dead Calm 4, he and Marconi lost to Stryder & Patrick Hayes allowing Stryder a shot at the NWA East "216" Title held by Marconi. In GOUGE, now teaming with Mickey Gambino as "Bad Romance", he and his new partner won the vacant GOUGE Tag Team Championship after defeating Jimmy Jack Funk, Jr. & Rob McBride in Youngsville, North Carolina at Maul-O-Ween on October 23; they also defeated McBride & Otto Schwanz at Raleigh's Rebus Gallery Works on Maul-O-Ween II a week later.

Staletto and the 216 Clique continued feuding with Ryan Mitchell in NWA East. A six-man tag team match between the 216 Clique (Lou Marconi, Frank Staletto, and Dan Arkham) and Chris Taylor, Ryan Mitchell, & Jon Burton ended in a no-contest at Overdrive 2010 on November 6. A larger ten-man match pitting The 216 Clique (Frank Staletto, Kenny Hendrix, Dan Arkham, Chris Marx, & JJ DeVille) against Jon Burton, Patrick Hayes, Matt Barnett, & the Bunkhouse Boys (Bandit & Big Willie Blackheart) was two weeks later at Do Or Die 4 which Staletto's team won. Also that month, Stalletto defeated Chris Taylor at the Ohio Wrestling Alliance's November Nightmare in Defiance, Ohio. The last match of the year, saw The 216 Clique (Frank Staletto, Izzy Lambert, & Dan Graham) lose to Jon Burton & The Hansen Brothers (Crusher & Tony Hansen) at Christmas Chaos 4 on December 18, 2010. He was nominated by the promotion for "2010 Comeback of the Year" but lost out to fellow stablemate Lou Marconi.

==== 2011 ====
Managed by Count Grog, Bad Romance successfully defended the GOUGE Tag Team titles during the first half of 2011. The team beat Rob McBride & Robert Royal at Redneck Rumble in Wake Forest, North Carolina on January 8, and both the Krazy Killer Klowns and The Rat Pack (Jimmy Cicero & Brian Perry) in a Three-Way Dance at Winter Wars on February 19. Meanwhile, in NWA East, at February Fury 4, The 216 Clique (Frank Staletto & Dan Arkham) lost to The Hansen Brothers (Crusher & Tony Hansen). He and Arkham did, however, pick up a win at When Worlds Collide 4 over J-Ru & Travis Fame with the help of Shirley Doe and the Shirley Doe Experience (Jay Flash, Tony Johnson, and Apollyon). Earlier in the show, Stalletto and Marconi interfered in a match to help 216 Clique member "Notorious" Shane Taylor beat Stryder. At Crossfire 4, The 216 Clique (Frank Staletto, Dan Arkham, & Chris Marx) lost to The Beast & The Hansen Brothers (Tony & Crusher Hansen) via count-out. Later in the show, Stalletto lost to NWA East Heavyweight Champion Chris Taylor in a non-title match.

A week later Stalletto and Mickey Gambino nearly lost the GOUGE Tag Team Championship to The Rat Pack at GOUGE's 5th Anniversary Show. The interference of Lou Marconi in the final moments of the match, however, allowed them to retain the titles despite the team's disqualification. After the match, North Carolina Heavyweight Champion Vordell Walker ran into the ring on behalf of The Rat Pack causing a brawl between all six men. On April 29 at Burgh Brawl 15, The 216 Clique (Lou Marconi, Frank Staletto, Will Esquire, & Dan Arkham) lost a Wave The Colors match to The Hansen Brothers (Crusher & Tony Hansen) & The Yinzer Brothers (Gator & Beast). Also during the card, Staletto and other 216 Clique members participated in a 30-man Burgh Brawl battle royal. He and Marconi were scheduled to appear at Deaf Wrestlefest 2011 in a tag team match against Dennis Gregory & Patrick Hayes, however, the match was split into separate singles matches with Stalletto defeated Patrick Hayes.

Spending the summer in GOUGE, took part in several singles matches defeating Seymour Snott at MAYHEM on May 21. On June 25, 2011, upon accepting an appointment as GOUGE Commissioner, Stalletto's manager Count Grog sold his managerial contacts to Andre Adonisy at BORN to be GOUGED. That night, Stalletto defeated Tavare Hill, with the help outside interference by Adonisy, and later helped Marconi beat his opponent Rob McBride.

== Championships and accomplishments ==
- American States Wrestling Alliance
  - ASWA Light Heavyweight Championship (1 time)
  - ASWA Tag Team Championship (1 time) – with Lou Marconi
- GOUGE Wrestling
  - GOUGE Tag Team Championship (1 time) – with Micky Gambino
- International Wrestling Association
  - IWA Junior Heavyweight Championship (1 time)
- Steel City Wrestling
  - SCW Tag Team Championship (3 times) – with Futureshock, Stevie Richards and Lou Marconi
- Pro Wrestling Illustrated
  - PWI ranked him #236 of the top 500 singles wrestlers in the PWI 500 in 2000.
  - PWI ranked him #221 of the top 500 singles wrestlers in the PWI 500 in 1999.
  - PWI ranked him #236 of the top 500 singles wrestlers in the PWI 500 in 1998.
  - PWI ranked him #251 of the top 500 singles wrestlers in the PWI 500 in 1997.
  - PWI ranked him #272 of the top 500 singles wrestlers in the PWI 500 in 1996.
  - PWI ranked him #348 of the top 500 singles wrestlers in the PWI 500 in 1995.
- Other titles
  - MAPW Heavyweight Championship (1 time, first)
