= Brush Hill =

Historic house in Pennsylvania, United States

- U.S. National Register of Historic Places
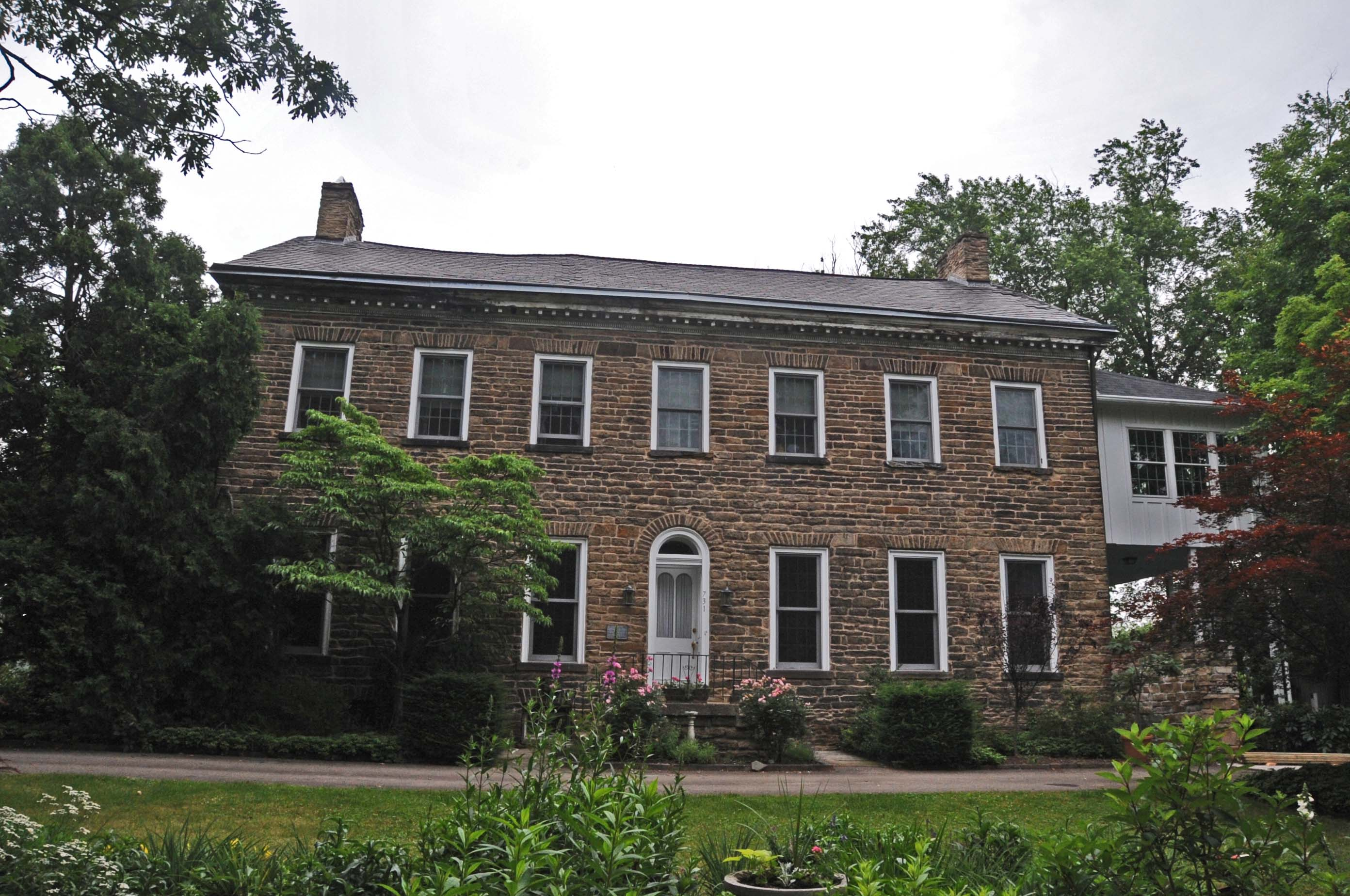
- Brush Hill, June 2013

- Location within Pennsylvania Location within the United States
- Location: 651 Brush Hill Rd., Irwin, Pennsylvania
- Coordinates: 40°19′30″N 79°41′22″W
- Area: 1 acre (0.40 ha)
- Built: 1798
- Built by: Irwin, Col. John
- Architectural style: Federal
- NRHP reference No.: 75001677
- Added to NRHP: October 14, 1975

Brush Hill, also known as Old Scull House, is a historic mansion located at Irwin, Westmoreland County, Pennsylvania. It was built in 1798, and is a two-story, Federal style dwelling. It is constructed of fieldstone.

It was added to the National Register of Historic Places in 1975.
