= Deaf Wrestlefest =

Professional wrestling charity event

- Event poster for the 2009 edition of Deaf Wrestlefest
- Promotion: Steel City Wrestling
- Date: 1994–2002; 2009–
- City: Edgewood, Pennsylvania
- Venue: Western Pennsylvania School for the Deaf

Deaf Wrestlefest is a professional wrestling supercard, produced annually in late April or early May by Lord Zoltan, a longtime wrestler and sports promoter based in Western Pennsylvania.

== Background ==
The Deaf Wrestlefest supercard event was first produced in 1994 by Lord Zoltan, originally as part of the Steel City Wrestling promotion, and produced six editions until the promotion closed in 2000, and two more independently. The school, according to Zoltan, then decided to discontinue the event due to the increasing violence and adult content associated with professional wrestling during the late-1990s. Two of his sons, both Deaf, attended the school during this period. Following a seven-year hiatus, it was revived for the school's 140th anniversary in 2009; the highlight of the show was J. J. Dillon who, in his first in-ring appearance since 1989, teamed with "Beef Stew" Lou Marconi and "Handsome" Frank Staletto in a six-man tag team match against "Franchise" Shane Douglas, Dominic Denucci and Cody Michaels.

The event is a staple on the East Coast and Mid-Atlantic independent circuit. Unlike standard wrestling events, however, an interpreter is provided to sign for the students during promos and for other parts of the show. Among the promotions represented at the event are the International Wrestling Cartel, Keystone State Wrestling Alliance, National Wrestling Alliance and UCW Wrestling; the arrival of the North Carolina–based G.O.U.G.E. Wrestling at the 2010 Deaf Wrestlefest marked the organization's debut in Pennsylvania. The event has featured a number of stars from Extreme Championship Wrestling, World Championship Wrestling, and World Wrestling Entertainment.

The Deaf Wrestlefest supercard is considered a major fundraiser for the Western Pennsylvania School for the Deaf and has raised, on average, between $3,000 and $4,000 per show. Proceeds from the event benefit Pennsylvania school programs to educate Deaf students.

== Show results ==
=== Deaf Wrestlefest (1994) ===
1994 in Edgewood, Pennsylvania (Western Pennsylvania School for the Deaf)

=== Deaf Wrestlefest (1995) ===
April 9, 1995 in Edgewood, Pennsylvania (Western Pennsylvania School for the Deaf)

No.	Results	Stipulations
1	Lord Zoltan and Psycho Mike defeated The American Patriots (Preston Steele and TC Reynolds)	Tag team match
2	Futureshock defeated The Godfather (with Notorious Norm)	Singles match
3	Super Mario defeated Frank Stalletto (with Notorious Norm)	Singles match
3	The Juicer and Preston Steele defeated Black Cat and Lou Marconi	Tag team match
4	Demolition Ax defeated Big Bully Busick	Singles match
5	T. Rantula (with The Black Widow) defeated Cactus Jack (c)	Singles match for the SCW Heavyweight Championship
(c) - refers to the champion prior to the match

=== Deaf Wrestlefest (1996) ===
April 21, 1996 in Edgewood, Pennsylvania (Western Pennsylvania School for the Deaf)

No.	Results	Stipulations
1	Benson Lee and Ninja Turtle defeated JB Destiny and Masahiro Panic	Tag team match
2	Paul Atlas defeated The Gravedigger	Singles match
3	Randy and Sean Evans wrestled to a time-limit draw	Singles match
4	Batman defeated The Shadow	Singles match
5	Dynamite Dean won the Deaf Wrestlefest Battle Royal	Deaf Wrestlefest Battle Royal
6	Lord Zoltan, Psycho Mike and T. Rantula (with Notorious Norm and The Black Widow) defeated Cody Michaels, Dynamite Dean and Preston Steele	Six-man tag team match
7	Stevie Richards and The Blue Meanie defeated Frank Stalletto and Lou Marconi (c)	Tag team match for the SCW Tag Team Championship
8	Koko B. Ware defeated The Iron Sheik	Singles match
(c) - refers to the champion prior to the match

=== Deaf Wrestlefest (1997) ===
April 22, 1997 in Edgewood, Pennsylvania (Western Pennsylvania School for the Deaf)

Vince Kaplack vs. Barry Kohlhoff ended in a draw.

=== Deaf Wrestlefest (1998) ===
April 26, 1998 in Edgewood, Pennsylvania (Western Pennsylvania School for the Deaf)

BombSquad defeated Dennis Gregory and Barry Kohlhoff.

=== Deaf Wrestlefest (1999) ===
April 18, 1999 in Edgewood, Pennsylvania (Western Pennsylvania School for the Deaf)

No.	Results	Stipulations
1	Dynamite Dean won the Deaf Wrestlefest Battle Royal	Deaf Wrestlefest Battle royal
2	Robert Gibson defeated Tom Brandi (with Drew Lazario)	Singles match
3	Slick Rick defeated Havoc	Singles match
4	The Dope Show (Big Neil The Real Deal and Shirley Doe) (with The Black Widow and The Joker) defeated Bison and Powerhouse Hughes	Tag team match
5	Batman defeated Vladimir Vampyre (with Drew Lazario)	Singles match
6	Awesome Arpin defeated Goonberg	Singles match
7	The Player (with Drew Lazario) defeated Dennis Gregory	Singles match
8	Cody Michaels (c) defeated Preston Steele	Singles match for the SCW Heavyweight Championship
9	Dynamite Dean defeated Nick Crane	Singles match
10	Super Hentai defeated Vince Viper	Singles match
(c) - refers to the champion prior to the match

=== Deaf Wrestlefest Y2K (2000) ===
April 12, 2000, in Edgewood, Pennsylvania (Western Pennsylvania School for the Deaf)

No.	Results	Stipulations	Times
1	Tarek the Great vs. American Kickboxer	Singles match	
10	King Kong Bundy vs. Preston Steele	Singles match	
(c) - refers to the champion prior to the match

=== Deaf Wrestlefest 2K1 (2001) ===
April 29, 2001, in Edgewood, Pennsylvania (Western Pennsylvania School for the Deaf)

No.	Results	Stipulations
10	The Patriot vs. King Kaluha	Singles match
(c) - refers to the champion prior to the match

=== Deaf Wrestlefest 2K2 (2002) ===
April 21, 2002, in Edgewood, Pennsylvania (Western Pennsylvania School for the Deaf)

=== Deaf Wrestlefest (2009) ===
May 3, 2009, in Edgewood, Pennsylvania (Western Pennsylvania School for the Deaf)

No.	Results	Stipulations
1	Jason Gory and Justin Idol wrestled to a time-limit draw	Singles match
2	Private Twinkie defeated Eric Xtasy (with Krystal Frost)	Singles match
3	Powerhouse Hughes defeated Bill Collier	Tag team match
4	Patrick Hayes defeated Bobby Shields and Super Hentai	Three-way match
5	Kris Kash and Anthony Alexander defeated The V.I.P.s (Shawn Blanchard and Lou Martin) (with Frank Durso)	Singles match
6	Tennessee Ernie Nord and Seymour Snott defeated Devin Devine and Dash Bennett (with Stacy Hunter)	Singles match
7	Brutus "the Barber" Beefcake defeated King Kaluha (with Stacy Hunter) by disqualification	Hair vs. Hair match; due to a pre-match stipulation Stacy Hunter's hair was cut.
8	The Gambino Brothers (Marshall and Mickey Gambino) (with Vicki Gambino) defeated The Wrong Crowd (Brian Anthony and Paul Atlas) (with Curtis N. Stevenson)	Tag team match
9	Dominic DeNucci, Cody Michaels and Shane Douglas (with Missy Hyatt) defeated J. J. Dillon, Lou Marconi and Frank Staletto (with Count Grog)	Six-man tag team match
10	J.T. Hogg won Deaf Wrestlefest Battle Royal	Deaf Wrestlefest battle royal
11	Sara Brooks and Hailey Hatred defeated Morgan Rockefellor and Brittany Force (with Stacy Hunter)	Tag team match
12	C.J. Sensation defeated Jimmy DeMarco and Apollyon	Three-way match
13	Sheriff Steele (with Mayor Mystery) pinned Seth James	Singles match
14	Leviathan pinned Wraith (with Johnny Demonic)	Singles match
15	Dennis Gregory pinned Crusher Hansen (with B.C. Steele)	Singles match
16	Dynamite Dean pinned Bubba the Bulldog (with Aaron Lester)	Singles match
(c) - refers to the champion prior to the match

=== Deaf Wrestlefest (2010) ===
May 2, 2010, in Edgewood, Pennsylvania (Western Pennsylvania School for the Deaf)

No.	Results	Stipulations
1	Crusher Hansen (with Tony Hansen and BC Steele) defeated Jason Cage	Singles match
2	Joe Brooks defeated Scott Prodigy (with Stacy Hunter)	Singles match
3	Angeldust and Jimmi The High Flyin Hippie defeated Shawn Blaze and Britney Force	Mixed tag team match
4	Dynamite Dean defeated Barry Ray Kohlhoff (c) (with PIV)	Singles match for the Alabama State Heavyweight Championship
5	The Blue Meanie defeated Sheriff Steele (with Mayor Mystery)	Singles match
6	Stryder and Shane Douglas (with Dominic DeNucci) defeated J-Ru & Bill Collier (with Dr. Feelbad)	Tag team match
7	David Sammartino and Larry Zbyszko defeated Lou Marconi and Frank Staletto (with Count Grog) by disqualification	Tag team match with Mick Foley as the special guest referee
6	Seymour Snott (c) defeated Logan Hodge	Singles match for the G.O.U.G.E. Heavyweight Championship
7	The Bulldozer (c) defeated Toby Cline	Singles match for the UCW Heavyweight Championship
8	Patrick Hayes (c) defeated Ashton Amherst (with Morgan Rockafeller)	Singles match for the NWA East Heavyweight Championship
9	Bubba The Bulldog defeated Jon Burton	Singles match
10	Kris Kash, Justin Sane and The Latin Assassin defeated The VIPs (Shawn Blanchard, Lou Martin and Anthony Alexander) (with Frank Durso)	Six-man tag team match
(c) - refers to the champion prior to the match

=== Deaf Wrestlefest (2011) ===
May 1, 2011, in Edgewood, Pennsylvania (Western Pennsylvania School for the Deaf)

No.	Results	Stipulations
1	Dennis Gregory and Lou Marconi went to a ten-minute time limit draw	Singles match
2	J-Ru defeated Johnny Mercury	Singles match
3	Seymour Snott defeated Jimmy Jack Funk, Jr. (with Admir Al Akbar)	Singles match
4	Justin Sane and Kris Kash defeated The VIP's (Shawn Blanchard and Lou Martin) (with Frank Durso)	Tag team match
5	Dash Bennett defeated Trailer Park Heat (with Stacy Hunter)	Singles match
6	Zach Gowen defeated Jason Gory (with Vicki Gambino)	Singles match
7	Tony Atlas, Shane Douglas and Dynamite Dean (with Dominic Denucci) defeated Sean Alexander, Bill Collier and Bobby Shields (with J-Ru)	Six-man tag team match
8	Frank Stalletto (with Count Grog) defeated Patrick Hayes	Singles match
9	Damien Wayne defeated Scott Prodigy	Singles match
10	Jimii the High Flyin Hippie defeated Brittany Force (with Morgan Rockafellar)	Intergender singles match
11	Jon Burton defeated Crusher Hansen (with Shawn Patrick)	Singles match
12	Doink the Clown defeated Nasty Nick Crane (with Mayor Mystery)	Singles match
(c) - refers to the champion prior to the match

=== Deaf Wrestlefest (2012) ===
April 29, 2012, in Edgewood, Pennsylvania (Western Pennsylvania School for the Deaf)

No.	Results	Stipulations
1	Jason Cage and Jock Samson wrestled to a ten-minute time limit draw	Singles match
2	Lou Marconi and Frank Stalletto (with Notorious Norm) defeated The Gambino Brothers (Marshall and Mickey Gambino)	Tag team match
3	Ryan Mitchell defeated Ashton Amherst	Singles match
4	Patrick Hayes defeated Trevor Lowe	Singles match
5	Preston Steele, Dennis Gregory and Johnny Mercury defeated Ali Kaida, Nasty Nick Crane and Sniper (with Mayor Mystery)	Six-man tag team match
6	Gregory Iron defeated Bobby Beverly	Singles match
7	Dynamite Dean defeated Terry Ring	Singles match
8	Shark Boy defeated J-Ru	Singles match
9	Zach Gowen defeated Jason Gory	Singles match
10	Bushwhacker Luke and Justin Sane (with Joker) defeated The VIP's (Shawn Blanchard and Lou Martin) (with Frank Durso)	Tag team match with Big Bully Busick as the special guest referee
