= Irwin, Pennsylvania =

Borough in Pennsylvania, US

- Borough
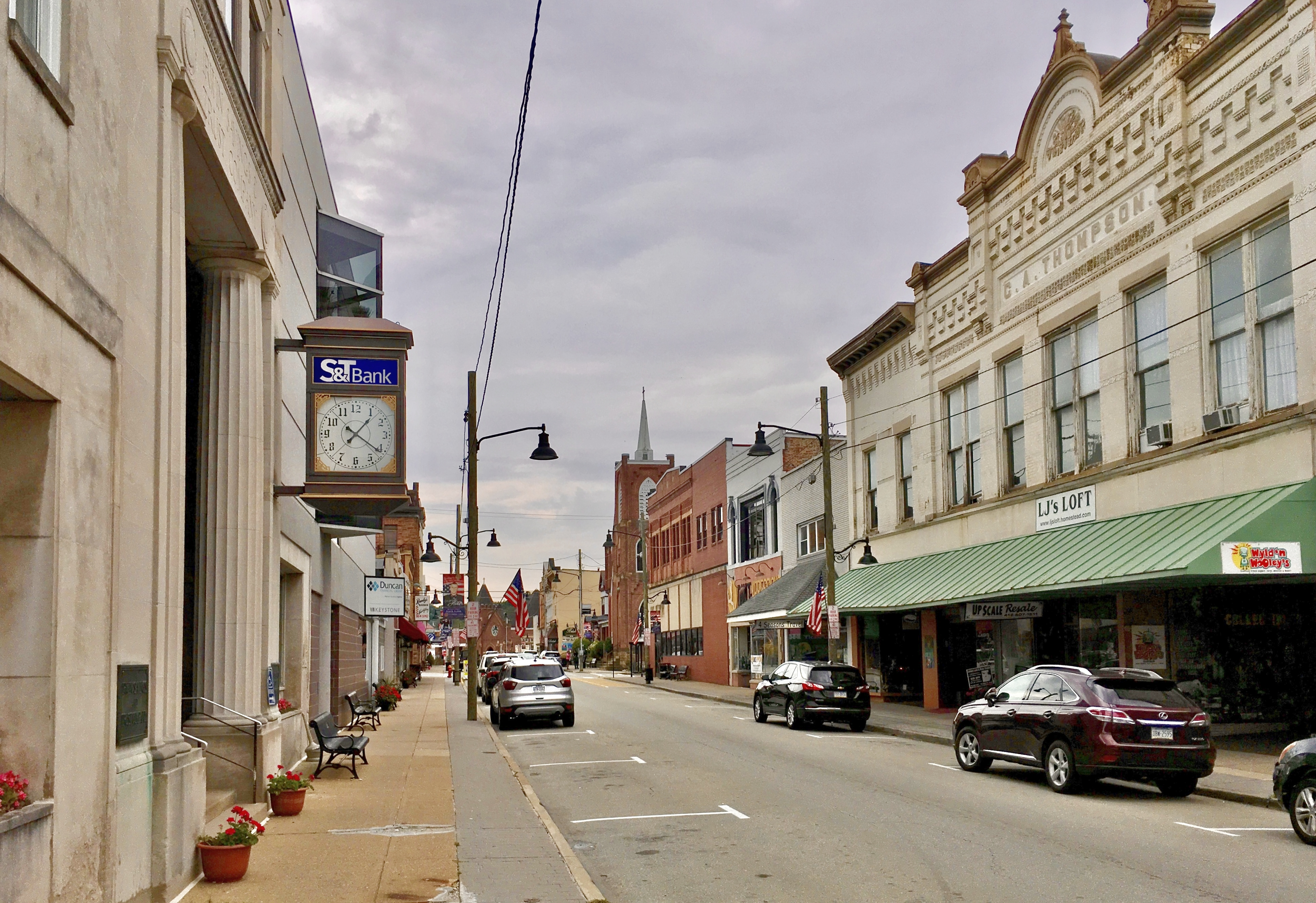
- Irwin's Main Street

- Location of Irwin in Westmoreland County, Pennsylvania.
- Coordinates: 40°19′40″N 79°42′11″W
- Country: United States
- State: Pennsylvania
- County: Westmoreland
- Settled: September 1853
- Incorporated: November 14, 1864

Government
  - Type: Borough Council
  - Mayor: Jeff Clem (R)

Area
  - Total: 0.84 sq mi (2.17 km^{2})
  - Land: 0.84 sq mi (2.17 km^{2})
  - Water: 0 sq mi (0.00 km^{2})
- Elevation: 1,007 ft (307 m)

Population (2020)
  - Total: 3,902
  - Density: 4,663.1/sq mi (1,800.43/km^{2})
- Time zone: UTC-5 (Eastern (EST))
  - Summer (DST): UTC-4 (EDT)
- Zip code: 15642
- Area code: 724
- FIPS code: 42-37208
- Website: Borough website

Irwin is a borough in Westmoreland County, Pennsylvania, United States. The population was 3,902 at the 2020 census. Located 22 miles (35 km) southeast of Pittsburgh, some of the most extensive bituminous coal deposits in the commonwealth are located in Irwin. In the past, iron foundries, flour mills, car shops, facing and planing mills, electrical goods and mirror factories were based in the borough.

== History ==
Irwin was named for John Irwin, the original owner of the town site.

Irwin was the original western terminus of the Pennsylvania Turnpike when it opened in October 1940.

Brush Hill was listed on the National Register of Historic Places in 1975.

== Geography ==
According to the United States Census Bureau, the borough has a total area of 0.9 square miles (2.3 km^{2}), all land.

== Demographics ==
Historical population
Census	Pop.	Note	%±
1820	405		—
1870	833		—
1880	1,444		73.3%
1890	2,428		68.1%
1900	2,452		1.0%
1910	2,886		17.7%
1920	3,235		12.1%
1930	3,443		6.4%
1940	3,441		−0.1%
1950	4,228		22.9%
1960	4,270		1.0%
1970	4,059		−4.9%
1980	4,995		23.1%
1990	4,604		−7.8%
2000	4,366		−5.2%
2010	3,973		−9.0%
2020	3,902		−1.8%

=== 2020 census ===
As of the 2020 census, Irwin had a population of 3,902. The median age was 41.3 years. 18.2% of residents were under the age of 18 and 19.9% of residents were 65 years of age or older. For every 100 females there were 92.7 males, and for every 100 females age 18 and over there were 89.0 males age 18 and over.

100.0% of residents lived in urban areas, while 0.0% lived in rural areas.

There were 2,009 households in Irwin, of which 21.3% had children under the age of 18 living in them. Of all households, 32.7% were married-couple households, 25.2% were households with a male householder and no spouse or partner present, and 35.0% were households with a female householder and no spouse or partner present. About 44.1% of all households were made up of individuals and 16.1% had someone living alone who was 65 years of age or older.

There were 2,198 housing units, of which 8.6% were vacant. The homeowner vacancy rate was 2.1% and the rental vacancy rate was 8.6%.

Racial composition as of the 2020 census
Race	Number	Percent
White	3,562	91.3%
Black or African American	94	2.4%
American Indian and Alaska Native	2	0.1%
Asian	59	1.5%
Native Hawaiian and Other Pacific Islander	2	0.1%
Some other race	11	0.3%
Two or more races	172	4.4%
Hispanic or Latino (of any race)	46	1.2%

=== 2000 census ===
As of the census of 2000, there were 4,366 people, 2,084 households, and 1,131 families residing in the borough. The population density was 4,947.0 inhabitants per square mile (1,910.0/km^{2}). There were 2,277 housing units at an average density of 2,580.0 per square mile (996.1/km^{2}). The racial makeup of the borough was 96.61% White, 1.01% African American, 0.09% Native American, 1.19% Asian, 0.02% Pacific Islander, 0.37% from other races, and 0.71% from two or more races. Hispanic or Latino of any race were 0.66% of the population.

There were 2,084 households, out of which 25.1% had children under the age of 18 living with them, 38.8% were married couples living together, 12.0% had a female householder with no husband present, and 45.7% were non-families. 39.5% of all households were made up of individuals, and 15.1% had someone living alone who was 65 years of age or older. The average household size was 2.09 and the average family size was 2.83.

In the borough the population was spread out, with 20.9% under the age of 18, 8.9% from 18 to 24, 32.7% from 25 to 44, 21.2% from 45 to 64, and 16.4% who were 65 years of age or older. The median age was 37 years. For every 100 females, there were 87.9 males. For every 100 females age 18 and over, there were 85.1 males.

The median income for a household in the borough was $32,758, and the median income for a family was $41,947. Males had a median income of $31,901 versus $23,519 for females. The per capita income for the borough was $18,722. About 6.6% of families and 8.8% of the population were below the poverty line, including 8.4% of those under age 18 and 5.6% of those age 65 or over.

== Notable people ==
- Doug Plank — former safety for The Ohio State University and National Football League’s Chicago Bears; held various coaching positions in the National Football League and Arena Football League following his playing career
- Mark Critz — former U.S. Representative for Pennsylvania's 12th congressional district
- Paul Doucette — drummer, rhythm guitarist, and backing vocalist for Matchbox Twenty; lead vocalist of The Break and Repair Method
- J. J. Matijevic — first baseman for the Texas League’s Corpus Christi Hooks and the Houston Astros; played for the University of Arizona
