= Lord Zoltan =

American professional wrestler (born 1957)

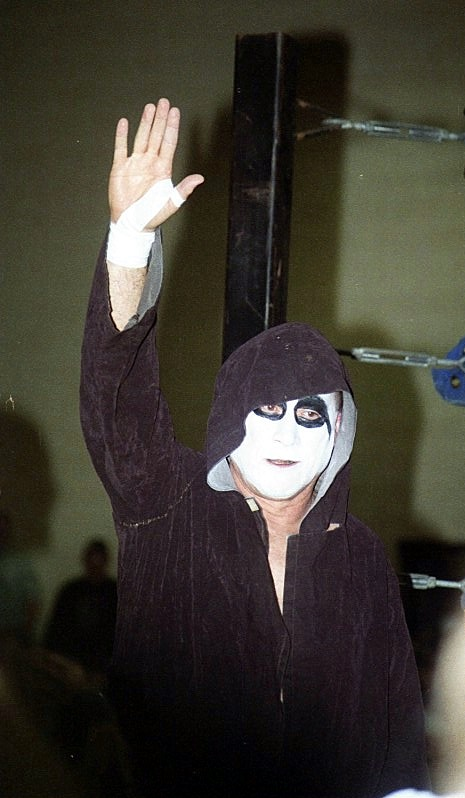
- Jugan in 2009

Personal information
- Born: Ken Jugan; October 16, 1957 (age 69) Glassport, Pennsylvania, U.S.

Professional wrestling career
- Ring name(s): Lord Zoltan; Zoltan the Great; King Kabooki; Ken Jugan
- Billed height: 5 ft 11 in (1.80 m)
- Billed weight: 222 lb (101 kg)
- Billed from: Bourbon Street, New Orleans; Helsinki, Finland; Parts Unknown; Pittsburgh, Pennsylvania (as Ken Jugan)
- Debut: 1976
- Retired: 2018

Ken Jugan (born October 16, 1957), better known by the ring name Lord Zoltan, is an American semi-retired professional wrestler, manager, promoter, referee, and trainer. Jugan has been a mainstay in the Greater Pittsburgh area of Pennsylvania and its surrounding states of Ohio and West Virginia, holding several junior heavyweight championships in the region since his debut in 1975.

Jugan was one of the first wrestlers to start wearing facepaint in the late-1970s and, according to Pro Wrestling Illustrated, has one of the most unusual "gimmicks" in professional wrestling.

He was the owner of Three Rivers Wrestling from 1977 to 1979, co-owner of Ohio Championship Wrestling from 1982 to 1983, and competed in Dick the Bruiser's World Wrestling Association. Jugan also worked for the National Wrestling Alliance and the World Wrestling Federation as a preliminary wrestler and referee during the early-to-mid 1980s.

Jugan was one of the biggest "indy" stars in Pennsylvania during the 1990s. He founded Deaf Wrestlefest, a long-running benefit show for the Western Pennsylvania School for the Deaf, which ran from 1994 to 2002, and again from 2009 to 2012, and raised over $100,000. In Pittsburgh's Steel City Wrestling, he held the promotion's junior heavyweight championship for over three years before his defeat by Reckless Youth in 1998. While in SCW, Jugan was the leader of The Dope Show, a "heel" stable, with Shirley Doe and Big Neal the Real Deal. He also had a long-running feud with Dominic DeNucci, Doink the Clown, and T.C. Reynolds on the independent circuit.

Jugan dedicated much of his later wrestling career to helping raise money for cancer research, civic organizations, and other charitable causes though independent wrestling shows. On March 20, 2012, Jugan was recognized by the city of Pittsburgh, which declared it "Ken Jugan Day". A year later, Jugan received the Jason Sanderson Humanitarian Award from the Cauliflower Alley Club for both Deaf Wrestlefest and other charity work. Described as "local legend" by Pittsburgh Magazine in 2013, Jugan is considered one of the most important independent wrestlers to come out of Western Pennsylvania.

== Early life and education ==
Jugan was born in Glassport, Pennsylvania, on October 16, 1957. He became interested in professional wrestling as a child after attending a live event at the McKeesport Palisades. Jugan later became a regular studio audience member on the famed Saturday night television program Studio Wrestling. Although the show was restricted to people over 18, Jugan was often sneaked in through the back door of the WIIC-TV studio by Bruno Sammartino's manager and sat in the back row of the bleachers.

Jugan studied photography in school and began taking pictures at the matches, eventually becoming an official ringside photographer during the final years of Studio Wrestling, during which he was a photographer and writer for various wrestling magazines and newsletters. He was also president of a fanclub for Luis Martinez.

== Professional wrestling career ==
=== Early career (1975–1977) ===
As a ringside photographer, Jugan became acquainted with a number of promoters and wrestlers in Greater Pittsburgh, including Newt Tattrie. At age 18, the 165 lbs. Jugan unexpectedly wrestled his first match in November 1975 when a wrestler failed to appear for an event he was covering in Clarksburg, West Virginia. Jugan decided to continue wrestling after being laid off from his regular job at Union Railroad in Duquesne. His first match as Lord Zoltan was at Ponderosa Park in Salem, Ohio. B

In 1976, he was wrestling as "Zoltan the Great" in Ohio and West Virginia, and was among the first wrestlers to start wearing facepaint in the late-1970s. The "Zoltan" ringname was an homage to Pittsburgh promoter Zoltan "Ace" Freeman and the other half inspired by Alexander the Great. He also made two appearances as "King Kabooki" for The Original Sheik in Detroit. Jugan started refereeing matches as well. Jugan won one of his first championship titles, the NACW Junior Heavyweight Championship, in West Virginia's North American Championship Wrestling. Jugan eventually emerged as a prominent wrestler in Greater Pittsburgh and surrounding states during the late-1970s and early 1980s. Pro Wrestling Illustrated described Zoltan's in-ring persona as "one of wrestling's crazier characters", alternating between "ominous"-looking facepaint and a wrestling mask, who had "perfected the art of distracting referees while he uses foreign objects and illegal tactics against his opponents".

=== Three Rivers Wrestling Association (1977–1979) ===
Jugan started his own "outlaw" promotion, Three Rivers Wrestling Association (TRWA), in 1977. The promotion was covered in a number of wrestling publications, such as The Ring's Wrestling, The Wrestling News, and Wrestling Monthly, and many of its stars regularly performed as preliminary wrestlers for the World Wide Wrestling Federation. Bobby Fulton spent much of his early career in the TRWA where he trained with Jugan, Fred and Bull Curry, and Charlie Fulton. The promotion merged with the Knoxville, Tennessee-based All-Star Wrestling in September 1979 shortly after its split from Southeastern Championship Wrestling earlier that year.

=== World Wrestling Association (1982) ===
Jugan was one of several West Virginia promoters who began working with Dick the Bruiser's World Wrestling Association in Indianapolis, Indiana, during the early-1980s. Jugan soon began wrestling for the WWA as "Zoltan the Great" in mid-1982. One of his first matches in the promotion was against Mike Dupree at the Market Square Arena on July 5, which he won. Jugan made several more appearances at the venue wrestling El Bracero, Rufus R. Jones, and J.R. Hogg during the next several weeks.

=== Ohio Championship Wrestling (1982–1983) ===
In the fall of 1982, Jugan began working for Traitor Tim Hampton's Ohio Championship Wrestling in Cleveland. He was a founding member of the "outlaw promotion" along with Ed Bonzo and J.W. Hawk. With their connections to the WWA, they were able to start broadcasting televised matches on cable channels 24 and 27 in the Cleveland area. The promotion held its first event, a three-day November supercard, where it crowned Bobo Brazil as its first champion. On the second night in Maple Heights, Ohio, Jugan won a battle royal to earn a title shot against Brazil on the third show in Parma. Jugan was part of a heel stable managed by Beefy LaPorque that included Ed Bonzo and J.W. Hawk until the end of the promotion's run in the spring of 1983. Jugan and Hawk were also managed by Greg "Punk Rock" Mason for a time. Jugan would later form a tag team with LaPorque, wrestling as The Incredible Bulk, called The Funkadelix.

=== World Wrestling Association (1983) ===
Jugan returned to the WWA after the close of Ohio Championship Wrestling. On March 12, 1983, Jugan wrestled two matches in one night at Tyndall Armory in Indianapolis. He and El Bracero fought to a draw in the first match then lost to Spike Huber later on that night. During the next two months, Jugan also had matches against Bobby Bold Eagle, Steve Cooper, Greg Lake, Max Blue, and Jose Elizia. On May 7, Jugan and Black Saint lost to El Bracero and J.R. Hogg in Madison, Indiana. He and The Black Cat also lost to El Bracero and Bobby Bold Eagle in Seymour, Indiana, a week later.

=== World Wrestling Federation (1983–1984) ===
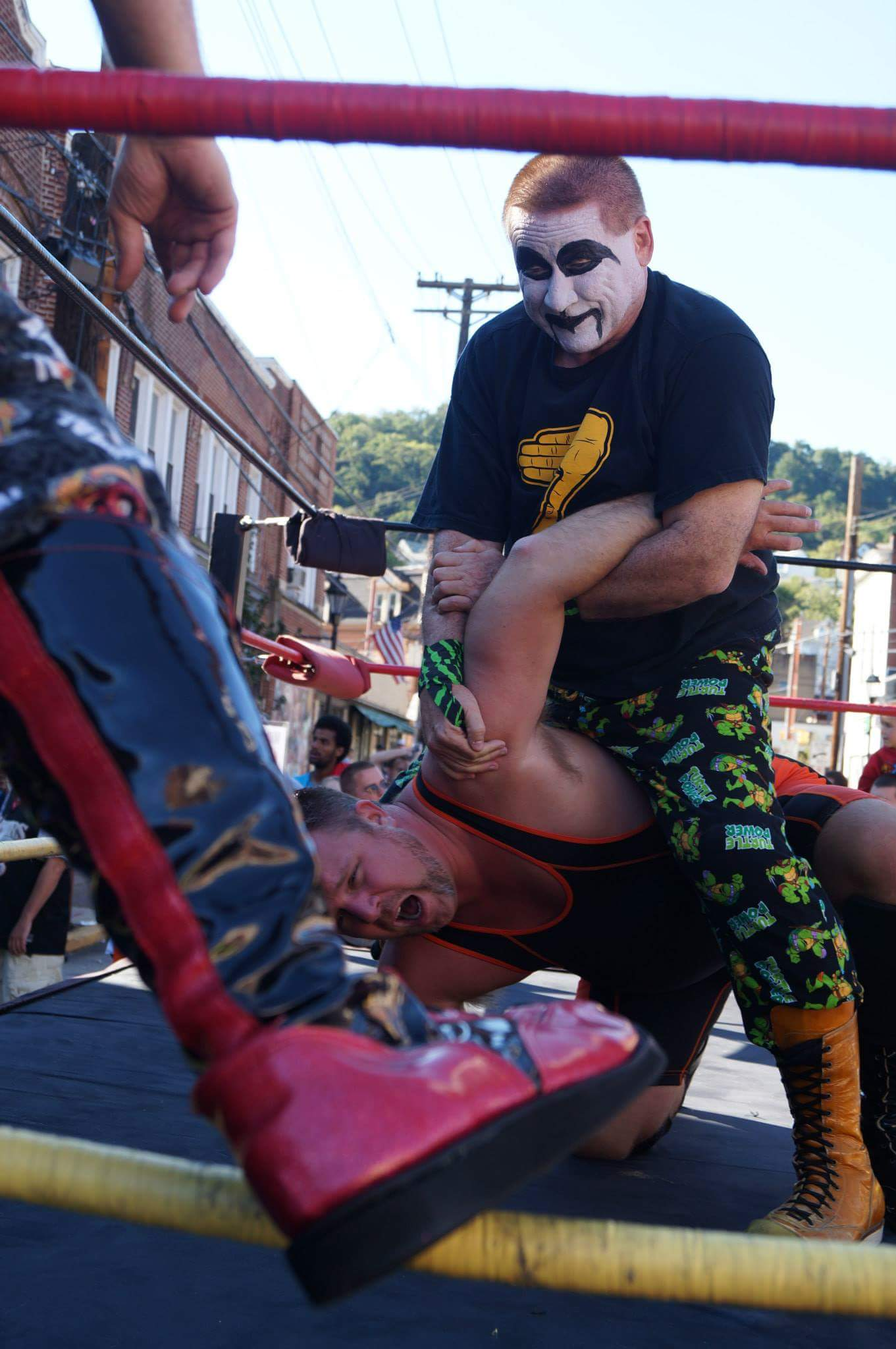
Lord Zoltan with Shawn Blanchard in an Arm Bar with the KSWA

Jugan began wrestling for the World Wrestling Federation as a preliminary wrestler mostly appearing for WWF house shows in Allentown and Hamburg, Pennsylvania. One of his first appearances was on the May 14 edition of WWF Championship Wrestling to wrestle Tito Santana.

Over the next few weeks, Jugan faced Salvatore Bellomo and Tony Garea. He also teamed with Bill Dixon to wrestle The Invaders (Invader #1 and #2) during the summer. On July 9, Jugan and Angelo Gomez unsuccessfully challenged Andre the Giant in a handicap match. The two men lost the match when Jugan was thrown out of the ring and his partner pinned by Andre. Due to the circumstances of the match, Jugan has often claimed he is "undefeated" against the legendary wrestler. He is one of the few currently active wrestlers to have faced Andre the Giant. On September 6, 1983, Jugan teamed with Tony Garea and Swede Hansen in a losing effort against Samula and The Wild Samoans (Afa and Sika). He also continued wrestling in Michigan and Ohio under his Zoltan in-ring persona so fans would not recognize him on WWF television.

On January 1, 1984, Jugan wrestled "Dr. D" David Schultz for a WWF TV taping at the Chase Park Plaza Hotel in St. Louis; their bout was later aired during the short-lived revival of Wrestling at the Chase.

On the January 7 edition of WWF All Star Wrestling, Jugan lost to Sgt. Slaughter after submitting to the Cobra Clutch submission hold. The following week, Jugan wrestled then WWF World Heavyweight Champion The Iron Sheik (with "Classy" Freddie Blassie) and lost after submitting to his Camel Clutch finisher. Jugan was similarly defeated by Greg "The Hammer" Valentine, with Captain Lou Albano) using a figure-four leglock on the January 28th edition of WWF All Star Wrestling.

On February 4, Jugan teamed with Eddie Gilbert and Frankie Williams in a 6-man tag team match against The Wild Samoans with Captain Lou Albano; Jugan's team lost when Afa pinned Williams after a Samoan drop. On February 11, Jugan and Bill Dixon wrestled Eddie Gilbert and B. Brian Blair in Allentown, Pennsylvania. He lost to The Iron Sheik in Allentown a week later. Their WWF Championship Wrestling match was used to set up The Iron Sheik's feud with Sgt. Slaughter.

On February 18, Jugan was pinned by Paul Orndorff (with "Rowdy" Roddy Piper) on WWF Championship Wrestling. On February 24, Jugan wrestled Samula at the Pittsburgh Civic Arena. On March 3, 1984, in one of his last WWF appearances, Jugan teamed with Steve Lombardi to wrestle Mr. Fuji and Tiger Chung Lee in Allentown.

=== Semi-retirement (1985–1991) ===
Jugan began refereeing matches in the Greater Pittsburgh-area for the WWF during the mid-1980s. The decision would soon threaten his wrestling career as the Pennsylvania State Athletic Commission would not allow Jugan to hold a "duel license". Jugan opted to continue refereeing for the WWF was effectively "banned" from competition in Pennsylvania for several years. Outside of his home state, however, Jugan continued wrestling in the various territories of the National Wrestling Alliance, as well as outlaw promotions, throughout the country. On January 17, 1985, Jugan wrestled "Dirty" Dick Slater during a Pittsburgh TV taping of Championship Wrestling from Georgia. Jugan became semi-active during this period and, after being engaged to his future wife, began working as an administrative assistant for the Allegheny County Court of Common Pleas.

On November 16, 1986, Jugan and Bobby Duncum, Sr. lost to Kurt Kaugman and Troy Orndorff in Clarksburg, West Virginia, via count out. He returned to Clarksburg on February 13, 1987, where he and Umana Zanuk defeated Crusher Klebanski and Tony Nardo. Jugan also held the Great Lakes Wrestling Association Junior Heavyweight Championship but lost the belt to Sam Houston on November 17, 1989, at the Front Row Theatre in Cleveland, Ohio.

=== Independent circuit (1992–1994) ===
Jugan continued wrestling following the breakup of the NWA territory system in the early-1990s. In January 1992, Jugan beat Michael Quinn in Cincinnati, Ohio, for the American States Wrestling Alliance's Ohio Junior Heavyweight Championship. He lost the belt to Kid Collins in Mansfield, Ohio, three months later. Jugan also worked for Cleveland All-Pro Wrestling during this period. On May 7, Jugan wrestled T.C. Reynolds at a CAPW show. The next night, Jugan and Jesse Sellica wrestled The Bushwhackers. He also feuded with Dusty Wolfe while in ASWA.

Jugan spent much of 1994 feuding with Johnny Graham on the independent circuit. Their bout at "Sauconfest '94" in Lower Saucon Township, Pennsylvania, was praised by The Morning Call, which reported that Jugan "was so hyped he needed an attending physician to hypnotize him into behaving". On September 24 in Munhall, Pennsylvania, he lost to "Beef Stew" Lou Marconi in a match to crown the inaugural ACW Mid-America Heavyweight Champion. Jugan defeated Graham in an "Eye of the Hurricane" match for the ACW Light Heavyweight Championship in Lewistown, Pennsylvania on October 1, but dropped the title to Graham two weeks later.

=== Steel City Wrestling (1994–1996) ===
In late-1994, Jugan joined Norm Connors' Steel City Wrestling based in Pittsburgh. On October 8, 1994, Jugan entered a one-night tournament in Connellsville, Pennsylvania, to crown the inaugural SCW Junior Heavyweight Champion. He defeated Chris Hamrick in the semi-finals and Scotty McKeaver in the finals to win the title. On December 17, 1994, Jugan and Boo Boo Henderson beat Buddah and T. Rantula in a tag team street fight match in Parkersburg, West Virginia. At the end of the year, Jugan was ranked #458 in Pro Wrestling Illustrated's annual PWI 500. That same year, Jugan promoted Deaf Wrestlefest, a fundraiser for the Western Pennsylvania School for the Deaf in Edgewood, Pennsylvania. His two sons, both hearing-impaired, were students the school.

He and his wife were approached at a PTA meeting when the then newly appointed school superintendent was looking for new fundraising ideas. The event was performed specifically for a hearing-impaired audience with sign language being used to communicate promos and other information. Deaf Wrestlefest became an annual event for Steel City Wrestling, attracting a number of high-profile stars, until its close five years later. Jugan was an active participant in the first few events but gradually ceased wrestling to concentrate exclusively on promoting the event. Local Pennsylvania promoters allowed him to borrow their permits so that Jugan would be allowed to run the shows.

Jugan spent the first half of 1995 feuding with T.C. Reynolds over his newly won title. He also wrestled Cactus Jack in a non-title match, which Jugan lost, in Weirton, West Virginia, on April 7. That spring, Jugan also began teaming with Psycho Mike as The Master Blasterz on the Ohio independent circuit. The team faced The Bushwhackers (Bushwacker Luke and Bushwacker Butch) at IWA's "Rumble in Trumbull '95" as well as The American Patriots (Preston Steele and T.C. Reynolds) at Deaf Wrestlefest 1995. Psycho Mike later counted Jugan among his top five favorite tag team partners of his career.

Jugan's feud with Reynolds also spread to other promotions. On April 21, Jugan captured the United States Wrestling League Intercontinental Championship from Reynolds in Ellwood City, Pennsylvania. Four months later, the two met during a one-night tournament in New Castle, Pennsylvania, for the SCW Pennsylvania State Junior Heavyweight Championship. They were both eliminated from the tournament when their match ended in a double-disqualification.

On October 14, Jugan lost the ACW light heavyweight title to Johnny Graham at "Fall Wrestlefest '95" in Lewistown, Pennsylvania. A week later in SCW, Jugan and his manager Notorious Norm lost a tag team match to Virgil and Bill Mickey, a local firefighter, at Connellsville High School. On November 11, Jugan lost to Mikey Whipwreck via disqualification at St. Mary's High School; Whipwreck had defeated Pablo Marquez earlier in the night to earn a SCW title shot at Jugan. Though successful in keeping his SCW title earlier that year, Jugan lost the USWL Intercontinental Championship to T.C. Reynolds at Butler Senior High School on December 18, 1995.

That spring, Jugan was among the top ten contenders in American Commonwealth Wrestling for the promotion's heavyweight title, then held by T. Rantula, but did not win the belt. On April 20, 1996, Jugan lost to Koko B. Ware in a non-title bout at the Upshur County Armory in Buckhannon, West Virginia. The next night at Deaf Wrestlefest 1996, The Master Blasterz and T. Rantula defeated Cody Michaels, Dynamite Dan, and Preston Steele in a six-man tag team match. Jugan also made appearances for Cleveland Wrestling Alliance and the United States Wrestling League during the summer. In the fall of 1996, Jugan made a brief appearance in Pro Wrestling eXpress.

On September 6, 1996, Jugan defeated Dennis Gregory for the PWX North American Heavyweight Championship in North Versailles, Pennsylvania. He re-lost the title to Gregory the next night in West Newton. On September 21, 1996, Jugan (with Notorious Norm) defeated Virgil via countout at the Tuscarawas County Fair in Dover, Ohio. A rematch held the following night at Pittsburgh's Sullivan Hall resulted in a double-countout.

=== Independent circuit (1997) ===
Jugan occasionally appeared in televised matches for United States Championship Wrestling throughout 1997. On April 12, 1997, Jugan and T. Rantula wrestled Ron Cumberledge and Preston Steele in Barberton, Ohio. On April 25, he wrestled T.C. Reynolds to a time-limit draw at a Pro Championship Wrestling show in Warren, Ohio. On August 22, Jugan wrestled J.T. Lightning at a United States Wrestling League show.

On December 13, 1997, Jugan pinned Matthew Starr at an Atlantic Coast Championship Wrestling show in Buckhannon, West Virginia.

=== Steel City Wrestling (1998–2000) ===
Jugan successfully defended the junior heavyweight title against Christian York at the SCW Arena in Irwin, Pennsylvania, on January 18, 1998. A match between York and Reckless Youth was scheduled to take place the following month, on February 8, to decide who would be Jugan's next opponent. Prior to the bout, York claimed to have suffered a severe knee injury and forfeited the match. York confronted Reckless Youth in the ring following this announcement and challenged his rival to face Jugan for the belt that night. This set up an impromptu title match between Jugan and Youth. Jugan ended up losing to Reckless Youth in this bout ending his three-year title reign. On February 15, Jugan successfully defended the ACW Light Heavyweight Championship against Preston Steele in Cleveland; he was awarded the bout via referee decision when Steele could no longer compete due to an ankle injury. Jugan went on to win an 18-man battle royal at the end of the night. He lost to Battman via disqualification in Cleveland on March 22 but retained the title.

On May 24, Jugan and T. Tantula attended an Extreme Championship Wrestling show in Rostraver, Pennsylvania, though they did not compete. Shortly after his title loss, Jugan formed a "heel" stable called The Dope Show with Shirley Doe and Big Neal the Real Deal. He and Shirley Doe began teaming regularly during this period. On July 9, they wrestled The Bushwhackers in Cambridge, Ohio. The following night in Irwin, The Dope Show defeated Don Montoya and Jimmy Cicero; Jugan would defeat Montoya in a singles match at the end of the month.

On August 28, Jugan and Rage faced High Society (Cueball Carmichael and Jimmy Cicero) at the SCW Arena. He also wrestled Carmichael in single matches during the next two months. On October 18, Jugan and Shirley Doe beat The Heartthrobs (Blade and Logan) at the SCW Arena. On November 13, Jugan wrestled Doink the Clown in a 30-minute match at Allied Powers Wrestling Federation's "Friday The 13th" supercard at Brockway High School. Jugan defeated Doink the following night at APWF's "Hell's Bells" in Big Run, Pennsylvania. On November 22, 1998, The Dope Show beat Flexx Wheeler and Nick Burke at the SCW Arena.

On January 16, 1999, Jugan wrestled Julio Sanchez in Burnside, Pennsylvania. The following night, The Dope Show defeated The Intimidators (Mark Mest and Vladimir Vampyre) in Weirton, West Virginia. On April 17, Jugan returned to Weirton where he wrestled Robert Gibson at SCW's King of West Virginia Tournament. On June 19, Jugan won a singles match against Sheriff Steele via disqualification in White Oak, Pennsylvania. On May 15, Jugan and T. Rantula wrestled The Thrillbillies in Ashtabula, Ohio.

On June 5, Jugan and Shirley Doe wrestled The American Jiggalos (Preston Steele and TC Renyolds) at a USWL show in Ellwood City, Pennsylvania. On July 8, The Dope Show beat The Intimidators in a rematch at the Agricultural Fair in Derry, Pennsylvania. On July 30, Jugan appeared at "Curtis Comes Home" in Belle Vernon, Pennsylvania, a tribute show to raise money for referee Mark Curtis, where he wrestled Dominic DeNucci in a Legends match. Jugan was pinned by DeNucci following a surprise appearance from Mick Foley.

On November 21, 1999, Jugan and Shirley Doe captured the SCW Tag Team Championship from Dennis Gregory and Lou Marconi in White Oak, Pennsylvania. They held the belts for nearly six months before their defeat by High Society (Cueball Carmichael and Jimmy Cicero) in McKeesport, Pennsylvania, on May 10, 2000. Doe later credited Jugan as one of his mentors while a tag team.

=== Independent circuit (2000–2005) ===
Prior to Steel City Wrestling's close that year, Jugan held what would be the last of the original Deaf Wrestlefest shows. Held on April 12, Deaf Wrestlefest Y2K's main event featured King Kong Bundy and Preston Steele. The school's decision to end the event was due to the increasing popularity of adult-oriented content and violence in mainstream pro wrestling largely promoted during World Wrestling Entertainment's "Attitude Era". Although the Deaf Wrestlefest shows had always been "family friendly", Jugan speculated that parents and school officials wanted to avoid bad publicity. Jugan two more shows independently before ending Deaf Wrestlefest. On September 13, 2001, Jugan lost to Doink the Clown at an Outlaw Championship Wrestling show in New Castle, Pennsylvania. On December 28, 2002, Jugan made a guest appearance for the International Wrestling Cartel defeating Jake Garrett at Hindman Hall in Butler, Pennsylvania. Ohio independent wrestlers J.T. Hogg, Scott Prodigy, and Sherman Tank have all credited Jugan for mentoring them during their early careers. Hogg, a kayfabe relative of one-time WWA rival J.R. Hogg, claimed that he wrestled Jugan at least 20 times in a six-month period. In early-2003, Jugan feuded with The Dream Team (Dean Jablonski, Joey Bravo, and Rowdy Ron) in the Ohio-based World Wide Wrestling promotion.

He lost to Joey Bravo at Tori's Station in Fairfield, Ohio, on January 31, 2003. Jugan also faced Dean Jablonski at the first annual "Rumble in the Rocks", a supercard co-hosted by the Championship Wrestling Federation and Pittsburgh Professional Wrestling, and at a Far North Wrestling show in Johnstown, Pennsylvania. At the end of year, Jugan began wrestling semi-regularly for the Championship Wrestling Federation. On December 13, 2003, Jugan defeated Powerhouse Hughes at "CWF Rampage" in Monessen, Pennsylvania.

On January 10, 2004, Jugan and Devin Devine defeated Dennis Gregory and Powerhouse Hughes at "CWF Motown Showdown '04" in Monessen. He beat Doink the Clown a month later at "CWF Unfinished Business IV". On March 13, Jugan challenged Dennis Gregory for the CWF Heavyweight Championship at "CWF March Madness 2004" in Bridgeville, Pennsylvania, however, the match ended in a double-countout. On March 26, Jugan lost to Joe Integra at a Far North Wrestling show in Latrobe, Pennsylvania. The following night at "Rumble in the Rox 2", Jugan faced to Larry Zbyszko in the main event. Jugan lost the bout when Zbyszko pinned him with a school boy rollup after an attempt by his manager, Mayor Mystery, to interfere in the match backfired. Jugan and Mayor Mystery's Parts Unknown Posse had attacked Dean Jablonski earlier that night before they were run off by Zbyszko. On April 3, Jugan defeated Kim Chee in front of 1,250 fans at IWC's "Night of Legends 1" in Franklin, Pennsylvania. On July 2, he wrestled The Honky Tonk Man at the Big Butler Fair in Prospect, Pennsylvania.

On October 9, Jugan lost to Doink the Clown at a Far North Wrestling event in Morgantown, West Virginia. That same month, Jugan was one of several wrestling legends to participate in a fundraising event for the Professional Wrestling Hall of Fame at Toronto's Fairfield Inn & Suites. On November 13, Jugan won the CWF Heavyweight Championship from Dennis Gregory at "CWF Monessen Mayhem". He successfully defended the title against Gregory at "CWF Holiday Havoc III" on November 27, winning via disqualification, and Powerhouse Hughes at "CWF Upside Down" on December 11, 2004.

On January 28, 2005, Jugan wrestled Doink the Clown in Butler, Pennsylvania, for Far North Wrestling. He returned to Butler several weeks later to defeat Battman.

On April 9, Jugan defeated Kim Chee in a Legends Lumberjack match at IWC's "Night of Legends 2". He also beat Rockin' Rebel, then making his PGH Pro debut, at "Rumble in the Rox 3" in McKees Rocks, Pennsylvania, a week later. On May 7, Jugan took part in a 12-man battle royal held at the Mark Curtis Memorial Reunion show in Johnson City, Tennessee. He was also invited to the 2006 Professional Wrestling Hall of Fame ceremony in Amsterdam, New York. Jugan would continue to be involved with the museum for several years. In the mid-2000s, he also active in the internet wrestling community and assisted wrestling historians. Jugan was one of the sources used by Count Grog in his KayfabeMemories.com article chronicling the history of Studio Wrestling and the Pittsburgh tri-state wrestling territory as well as helping Greg Oliver in his 2007 book "The Pro Wrestling Hall of Fame: The Heels".

After a near seven-month championship reign, Jugan lost the CWF title to Dr. Feelgood at "CWF Continuation" on June 11. Held during the weekend Mon Valley Summer Festival in Monessen, Jugan and The Russian Nightmare lost to Dr. Feelgood and Brian O in a Best Two Out of Three Falls match the second night at "CWF Climax". Two weeks later, Jugan and Doink the Clown fought to a double-disqualification at a Far North Wrestling show in Kittanning, Pennsylvania. On July 15, Jugan and Doink joined forces as The Dope Show against Bubba Brewer and Nikolai Volkoff at the Allied Powers Wrestling Federation's "Return To Glory" show at Kay Arena in Indiana, Pennsylvania. On July 29, Jugan and The Mauler defeated The Gambino Brothers (Marshall and Mickey Gambino) at another Far North Wrestling show in Butler, Pennsylvania; Dominic DeNucci was the special guest referee.

He returned to FNW later that year to face The Gambino Brothers in a rematch, this time with partner Kris Krude, but lost this second encounter. On November 20, 2005, Jugan wrestled Tito Santana at the IWC's "Newville Knockout" show in Newville, Pennsylvania. Starting in February 2006, Jugan had a 5-month run in Far North Wrestling appearing in matches against Sheriff Steele, JT Hogg, and Dennis Gregory. On May 12, Jugan wrestled Dominic DeNucci in Cranberry, Pennsylvania. Later that week, Jugan attended the 2006 Professional Wrestling Hall of Fame weekend.

=== Championship Wrestling Federation (2006–2007) ===
Jugan began teaming with Nasty Nick Crane as The French Ticklers in the CWF. On September 2, the team defeated The New Breed (New Breed 1 and New Breed 2) at "CWF Fall From Grace" in Monessen. Jugan also feuded with Doink the Clown for several weeks losing to him at "CWF No Escape" in Belle Vernon, Pennsylvania, via disqualification, and "CWF Believe The Hype" in Charleroi, Pennsylvania. The French Ticklers, however, had better luck in the CWF's tag team division. The team defeated Manifest Destiny (Eric Xtasy and Justin Idol) at the October 28 "CWF Halloween Horror 2" show and CWF Tag Team Champions The West Coast Hustlas (Benny Benz and DC Bentley) at the November 25 "CWF Upside Down" show. Jugan and Crane would hold the tag titles for a then record 75 weeks.

The French Ticklers would successfully defend their titles in a rematch against The West Coast Hustlas at "CWF Holiday Wishes II" on December 16, 2006. On January 27, 2007, at "CWF Collision Course 2007", the team once again retained the titles against Eric Xtasy and The ShareCropper. On February 10, Jugan defended the tag team titles with "Amir Al Jahari" (in reality his tag team partner Nick Crane) against The Steel City Saints (Bobby Shields and Chris LeRusso) at "CWF Unfinished Business VII". In March, Jugan wrestled matches against The Honky Tonk Man in Cleveland All-Pro Wrestling and Brodie Lee in Far North Wrestling. Meanwhile, in the CWF, The French Ticklers continued their winning streak by defeating The Masked Duo (The Masked Assassin and The Masked Express) at "CWF March Madness 2007" on March 23. One night later, Jugan managed for Larry Zbyszko in his match against Bruno Sammartino (with Domenic DeNucci) at the International Wrestling Cartel's "Night of Legends 3". Zbyszko was pinned by his opponent when Jugan accidentally hit Zbyszko during the bout.

On April 13 at "CWF Friday The 13th", The French Ticklers and Apollyon were defeated by Low Rider and The Factory (Dee Drake and The Beast) in a six-man tag team match. The following night at "CWF Return To The 'Roi" they defeated Bobby White, Jr. and Doink the Clown at Charleroi High School. On May 5, Jugan and Crane lost to The Factory at "CWF mass inSINity" but kept the tag team belts via disqualification. Jugan, accompanied by manager Count Grog, also wrestled The Missing Link at a special weekend show for the 2007 PWHoF induction ceremony, hosted by Northeast Championship Wrestling, at Wilbur Lynch Middle School in Amsterdam, New York. On June 1 at "CWF Rhythm House Rumble", The French Ticklers lost to Thunder In Paradise (Brett Paradise and Thunder) in a non-title match. The team also lost to J-Ru and Powerhouse Hughes via countout at "CWF Breakdown" a week later.

On June 23, Jugan and Crane beat Thunder In Paradise in a rematch at "CWF The Real Deal" in West Leisenring, Pennsylvania. Jugan was also scheduled to meet Dominic Denucci at CAPW's "A Night Of Legends" in Cleveland, the promotion's 14th anniversary show, but ended up wrestling Doink the Clown instead. On September 1 at "CWF Dilemma", The French Ticklers lost the CWF Tag Team Championship to J-Ru and Powerhouse Hughes, ending their reign at 280 days.

=== International Wrestling Cartel (2008) ===
On April 12, 2008, Jugan appeared on the International Wrestling Cartel's "Night of Legends IV" as the "handler" of Abdullah the Butcher in his bout against "Wildfire"Tommy Rich. The match was declared a no-contest after referee Bobby Williams was knocked out. This prompted Jugan to join Abdullah in his attack on Rich until Lumberjack Leroux came out to the rescue. On June 20, Jugan lost to Samuel Elias at a Far North Wrestling show in West Newton, Pennsylvania.

=== Pro Wrestling eXpress (2008) ===
That summer, Jugan joined Norm Connors' Pro Wrestling eXpress. On August 2, he entered the first annual Sean Evans Memorial Tournament at Renzie Park's Jacob Woll Pavilion in McKeesport and was eliminated in the opening rounds by Patrick Hayes. On August 23 at "PWX Infection", Jugan lost to Hayes in a match for the PWX Brass Knuckles Championship via countout. On September 13, Jugan wrestled The Honky Tonk Man at Serbian Hall in Youngstown, Ohio; the proceeds from the event went to the Holy Trinity Serbian Orthodox Church.

On September 20, Jugan and Leviathon beat "Handsome" Frank Staletto and "Beef Stew" Lou Marconi in a Throwback match at PWX's 14th Anniversary Show. Jugan also reunited with Nick Crane as The French Ticklers defeating The Franchise Players (Robert Beverly and Jon Kronica) at "PWX Desperate Measures 2" on October 10 and Awesome Force 5000 (Devin Devine and Dash Bennett) at PWX Do Or Die 2 on November 15. The French Ticklers lost to Awesome Force 5000 in a rematch at PWX Christmas Chaos 2 on December 13, 2008.

=== Independent circuit (2009) ===
In early-2009, Jugan made several appearances for Dr. Feelbad's Renegade Wrestling Alliance based in West Newton, Pennsylvania. On February 7, Jugan (with The Seductress) lost to Wildcat (with Nurse Missy) at "RWA Uprising". On February 27, 2009, Jugan wrestled Doink the Clown at an International Wrestling Association fundraiser for Liberty High School in Youngstown, Ohio. A March 14 fundraiser for Cleveland All-Pro Wrestling, "Home Run For The Kids", saw Jugan and The Bouncer challenge Virgil and "Ironman" Nick Vah in a tag team match at Cleveland's Estabrook Rec Center.

On March 28, at the International Wrestling Cartel's "Night of Legends 2009", Jugan lost to Lumberjack Leroux after WWF Hall of Famer George "The Animal" Steele interfered. On April 18 at RWA Spring Fling, Jugan teamed with Bulldozer and Michael McMoney (with Mayor Mystery) to wrestle Wildcat, Virgil, and Psyco in a six-man tag team match. On May 21, Jugan (with Mayor Mystery) was defeated by his former teammate Bulldozer at "RWA No Retreat". On July 25, Jugan defeated Clank The Clown at "RWA Backdraft" in Ellsworth, Pennsylvania. A few months later, Jugan managed Landshark in a losing effort against Kage (with Mike Trash) at "RWA Bloody Harvest".

On August 1 at IWC's "No Excuses 5", Jugan teamed with James Avery, Logan Shulo, and Shane Taylor (with Mayor Mystery) in an 8-man tag team match against Jimmy Snuka, Jon Bolen, Jimmy Vega$, and Michael Facade (with Dominic DeNucci). On August 7, Jugan entered the 2nd Annual Sean Evans Memorial Tournament was once again eliminated by Patrick Hayes in the first round.

Also that summer, Jugan also brought Deaf Wrestlefest back to the Western Pennsylvania School for the Deaf for its 140th anniversary. The event featured 16 matches, including a six-man tag team match pitting Dominic DeNucci, Cody Michaels and Shane Douglas (with Missy Hyatt) against J. J. Dillon, Lou Marconi and Frank Staletto (with Count Grog), as well as appearances from Brutus "The Barber" Beefcake and other wrestling stars. This was Dillon's first in-ring appearance since his retirement in 1989.

=== Keystone State Wrestling Alliance (2009–2012) ===
In addition to Deaf Wrestlefest, Jugan spent much of the last decade performing for wrestling events to raise money for cancer research, civic organizations, and annual Toys for Tots collection. Many of these events were hosted by the Keystone State Wrestling Alliance, an independent promotion based out of Lawrenceville, Pennsylvania, which he joined in the summer of 2009. His first appearance for the promotion was at the July 3rd "Lawrenceville Fireworks Celebration" in Arsenal Park where Jugan and Shawn Blanchard lost to Anthony Alexander and La Lucha. It was his first in-ring appearance in Pittsburgh in several years. Jugan soon engaged in a feud with former tag team partner Justin Sane. On August 29 at "When Worlds Collide", Jugan lost to Justin Sane via disqualification. Jugan avenged this loss at "Krazy Tour 2009" in Pittsburgh on September 12. On October 10 at "Autumn Annihilation", Jugan and Del Douglas lost to Justin Sane and Kris Kash. Jugan defeated Shawn Blanchard in his October debut for Xtreme Championship Wrestling.

Jugan beat La Lucha at KSWA's St. John Neumann Fundraiser a week later. The Jugan-Sane feud concluded at KSWA Fanfest/Toy Drive '09 on December 5 with Jugan defeating Justin Sane in a Loser Wears a Dress for a Year match. On December 12, 2009, Jugan teamed with Frank Staletto and Lou Marconi (with Mayor Mystery) in a special Steel City Wrestling "retro match" against Extreme Championship Wrestling alumni Shane Douglas and The Blue World Order (Da Blue Guy and Hollywood Nova) at IWC's "A Call To Arms 2009: Full Circle".

On January 23, 2010, Jugan and The Bulldozer defeated Alex Arcadian and Mitch Napier at "New Years Knockout '10". A month later, Jugan and The Blood Beast challenged KSWA Tag Team Champions Vinnie Stone and Ric Rumskey at "KSWA's 10 Year Anniversary Bash" but were unsuccessful. He and Blanchard teamed with Frank Durso in a 6-man tag team match against Dominic DeNucci, Vinnie Stone and Ric Rumskey at the third annual Joe Abby Memorial Tournament on March 27. On April 10, at the International Wrestling Cartel's "Night of Legends 2010", Jugan was part of The Billion Dollar Bone Breakers with Shane Taylor, The Irish Airborne (Dave and Jake Crist) and manager Chest Flexor which battled The Million Dollar Muscle Machine consisting of Jimmy DeMarco, Lumberjack Leroux, Doink the Clown, Virgil, and managed by Ted DiBiase. Jugan also made two appearances for Renegade Wrestling Alliance that spring.

On April 17, Jugan teamed with The TV Casualties (Tommy Horror and Johnny Switchblade) at "RWA Spring Fling 2" to defeat J-Ru and Team Tapout (Mr. Tapout and Chris Coleman). He also joined K-Star and Seymour Snott in another six-man tag team match defeating Ghost Rider Kenny, Jamie Northstarr, and Chris Miles at "RWA No Retreat 2" on May 1. That same night, Jugan traveled from West Newton to the KSWA Arena in Lawrenceville for "Mayhem 2010". He teamed with Anthony Alexander and Lou Martin to wrestle Larry Zbyszko, Justin Sane and Kris Kash. The following night, Jugan held Deaf Wrestlefest 2010 for the Western Pennsylvania School for the Deaf. The show featured former Extreme Championship Wrestling stars The Blue Meanie and Shane Douglas as well as wrestlers from G.O.U.G.E. Wrestling and the Keystone State Wrestling Alliance. In the main event, with Mick Foley as the special guest referee, David Sammartino and Larry Zbyszko defeated Lou Marconi and Frank Staletto (with Count Grog) by disqualification.

A little over two weeks later, at the 2010 St. John Neumann School Fundraiser, Jugan defeated Alex Arcadian and later won a $1000 Battle Royal in the main event. The battle royal was aired on the debut episode of KSWA's internet television show at the end of the month. On July 24, Jugan and The VIPs (Shane Blanchard, Lou Martin, and Anthony Alexander) lost to Tommy Faime, Shane Starr, Justin Sane and Kris Kash in an Ultimate Survivor match at "Summertime Bruise 2010". Jugan defeated J-Ru at a high school fundraiser in Monongahela, Pennsylvania, a week later. On August 14, Jugan once again teamed up with The VIPs (Lou Martin and Anthony Alexander) to defeat Kris Kash, Shane Starr, and Mike Malachi at KSWA's "Krazy Tour 2010". Jugan lost to KSWA Heavyweight Champion The Latin Assassin in a Triple Threat match, also involving Ali Kaida, via disqualification on August 21 "When Worlds Collide". One day later, Jugan and Steve Flash lost to The VIPs (Shawn Blanchard and Lou Martin) in the team's Mon Valley Pro Wrestling debut. On September 4, Jugan and Nick Crane lost to Doink The Clown and Dominic DeNucci at KSWA's memorial show for slain Pittsburgh police officer Paul Sciullo. On October 2 at "Autumn Annihilation 2010", Jugan defeated Bobby Badfingers. Two months later, Jugan and The Blood Beast lost to Bobby Badfingers and Mitch Napier at KSWA Fanfest/Toy Drive '10 on December 4, 2010.

On May 1, 2011, Jugan held Deaf Wrestlefest 2011 at the Western Pennsylvania School for the Deaf. The event included Dominic DeNucci, Shane Douglas, Tony Atlas, Doink the Clown, and Zach Gowen among others. On June 11, Jugan teamed with Justin Sane, Kris Kash, and Shane Starr at "Heatwave Havoc 2011" to defeat Shawn Blanchard, Lou Martin, Drew Belanger, and JP Goulet in an Ultimate Survivor match. Jugan was also in attendance at UFC Live: Kongo vs. Barry, along with CountingTheLights.com columnist Chris Wood, at the Consol Energy Center that same month.

On July 2, Jugan and Justin Sane defeated Shawn Blanchard and Lou Martin at the "Lawrenceville Fireworks Celebration" to win the KSWA Tag Team Championship. Jugan also beat Blanchard in a single mat via countout at "Summertime Bruise 2011" a week later. Jugan and Justin Sane successfully defended the tag team championship during KSWA's "Krazy Tour 2011" against Drew Belanger with partners J.P. Goulet in Sharpsburg (July 16) and Nick Crane in Plum, Pennsylvania (July 30). On August 13 at "When Worlds Collide 2011", the team defeated Del Douglas and The Jester; Jugan also won a battle royal that night. On September 10 at "Clash Against Cancer II", Jugan defeated Lou Martin via disqualification. At the 2-day Millvale Days Celebration, during the KSWA's "Road to Fan Fest '11", Jugan and Justin Sane beat Drew Belanger and Shawn Blanchard. The second night saw Jugan defeat Lou Martin in a rematch. Jugan also wrestled Doink the Clown at the J.T. Lightning Memorial Show on September 25; Shawn Blanchard accompanied Jugan in his managerial debut.

Jugan and Justin Sane defeated Del Douglas and Lou Martin, on the team's third stop during "Road to Fan Fest '11" (October 1), and Shawn Blanchard and Lou Martin at "Autumn Annihilation 2011". On November 5, Jugan and Justin Sane beat Del Douglas and The Jester and, at the final night of "Road to Fan Fest '11" (November 19), the team defeated Lou Martin, Drew Belanger, and J.P. Goulet in a six-man tag team match with Jay Flash; the event was a fundraiser for the Immaculate Conception School in Bloomfield, Pennsylvania.

On December 3, 2011, Jugan and Justin Sane defended their belts against Drew Belanger and J.P. Goulet at KSWA's Fan Fest/Toy Drive '11. They barely avoided losing them thanks to outside interference from Tony Marino. That same night, Jugan participated in a "celebrity" roast of Dominic DeNucci, part of a PWHoF Hall of Fame fundraiser, at the Sheraton Hotel in Green Tree, Pennsylvania. It was based on this performance that the organizers invited Jugan to host the 2012 induction ceremony a few months later.

On January 14, 2012, Party Gras and Kris Kash defeated Shawn Blanchard, Del Douglas, and The Jester at "New Years Knockout 2012". On February 4, Jugan and Justin Sane beat Blanchard and Brock Hudson at a KSWA interpromotional show with the West Virginia Wrestling Alliance. He also defeated Del Douglas at "Revenge 2012" on February 18. On March 20, the Pittsburgh city council declared it "Ken Jugan Day" in recognition of his charity work and wrestling career.

Four days later, at the fifth annual Joe Abby Memorial Tournament, Jugan was inducted into Keystone State Wrestling Alliance's Hall of Fame. He was the first-ever active wrestler to receive that honor. That same evening, Jugan and Justin Sane defeated Nick Crane and Shawn Blanchard. Party Gras beat the VIPs (Lou Martin and Shawn Blanchard) at a Lethal Championship Wrestling show the next night.

On April 14, Jugan and Shawn Blanchard (with J. J. Dillon) lost to Shane Douglas and Dominic DeNucci (with Bruno Sammartino) at the Pro Wrestling Superstars supercard "Wrestle Reunion 8" in Toronto, Ontario. Larry Zbyszko was originally supposed to be Jugan's partner in what was billed as another "Sammartino vs. Zbyszko" faceoff, but he was later replaced with Blanchard. Douglas and DeNucci won the match when Blanchard was pinned with a belly-to-belly suplex. The match received poor reviews, citing the advanced age of then 81-year-old DeNucci, however Jerome Cusson of PWPonderings.com defended the bout pointing out "when you've got someone as old as Denucci and a semi-retired wrestler in Douglas, it's tough to have a great artistic contest. At least it wasn't a long match. They kept it short and allowed the fans to honor the legends involved."

On April 28 at KSWA's "Unsanctioned 2012", Bushwhacker Luke and Party Gras defeated Shawn Blanchard, Del Douglas, and The Jester. The next evening, Jugan held the Deaf Wrestlefest 2012 at the Western Pennsylvania School for the Deaf. Gregory Iron, Ryan Mitchell, Shark Boy, and Zach Gowen were among the performers. In the main event, Bushwacker Luke and Justin Sane (with Joker) defeated The VIP's (Shawn Blanchard and Lou Martin) with Big Bully Busick as the special guest referee. Bruno Sammartino also headlined the event and donated a replica championship title to raffle off. Jugan credited Sammartino's donation being responsible for making it the highest-grossing Deaf Wrestlefest ever. With both his sons no longer students at the school, and many of the original parents no longer involved, this proved to be the last Deaf Wrestlefest. The annual wrestling show had been the school's primary fundraiser and raised an estimated $100,000 during its run. Jugan, however, did not rule out bringing back the event if the school expressed interest.

In early-May, Party Gras successfully defended the tag titles on the KSWA's "Krazy Tour '12" in Bloomington and Fox Chapel, Pennsylvania. Jugan was among a number of wrestling stars attending the 2012 Pro Wrestling Hall of Fame ceremony in Amsterdam, New York, and served as emcee during the induction ceremony. Jugan, a Pittsburgh Pirates fan, was interviewed by the Pittsburgh Post-Gazette in June to give his opinion on how the team should be managed. The publication jokingly suggested the wrestler should be the team's new mascot. Jugan was also interviewed on 100.7 FM's "Bubba Show" about the Pittsburgh Pirates. He told the hosts that he was a longtime fan and went to at least 20 games a season. Bubba Snider said on-air that he wanted to start a fan-based effort to get "Zoltan on the big screen at PNC Park for a Pirates game" as well as a visit with the team in the dugout prior to the game. Fans reportedly had been doing the "Zoltan" hand gesture, performed by Hal Sparks' character in the 2000 film Dude, Where's My Car?.

Party Gras continued defending the titles over the summer defeating Nick Crane and Sniper at "Heatwave Havoc 2012" on June 6 and Nick Crane and The Jester at "Super Summer Sizzler Tour '12" on June 30. Jugan also beat Nick Crane in a singles match at "Supertime Bruise '12" on July 14. On July 28 at "Super Summer Sizzler Tour '12" Jugan and Sane defeated J Ru and TJ Phillips in Plum, Pennsylvania. Party Gras defeated Shawn Blanchard and Brady Blaze at a Cleveland Wrestling Alliance show on August 4.

On August 18, Party Gras teamed with Super Ginger to defeat The Jester, Del Douglas, and Nick Crane at "When Worlds Collide 2012". The team began feuding with Douglas and The Jester that fall. Jugan defeated The Jester in single competition at "Autumn Annihilation" (October 6) and the "Road to Fan Fest '12 Tour" (November 3). Party Gras lost to RWA Tag Team Champions Ashton Amherst and Patrick Hayes at the Renegade Wrestling Alliance's "Bloody Harvest 4".

On December 8, 2012, Party Gras lost the belts to Del Douglas and The Jester at the "KSAW Fan Fest/Toy Drive '12". At the end of the year, Jugan announced that he would be cutting back his ring schedule to one event per month, down from his average 2–3 matches per week, to care for his parents who were both suffering health issues at the time.

=== Championship Wrestling Federation (2013) ===
On March 9, 2013, Jugan and Sane captured the CWF Tag Team Championship from The Mercenaries (Sniper and The Specialist) at CWF's Matt Madness in Connellsville, Pennsylvania. Three months later, Party Gras defended their titles at the third annual Celebrate America Festival in Monessen, Pennsylvania. The team held the tag team titles for a record 75 weeks.

On April 16, Jugan received the Jason Sanderson Humanitarian Award at the 2013 Cauliflower Alley Club reunion for his charity and fundraising efforts. The ceremony was held at the CAC's annual "Bologna Blowout" dinner at the Gold Coast Hotel and Casino in Las Vegas.

He hired a sign language interpreter for the deaf wrestlers and fans attending the ceremony. He was subsequently honored by Glassport mayor Michael Evanovich and the Allegheny County Council for his charity work.

Both Jugan and Evanovich expressed interest in holding a charity pro wrestling event in Jugan's hometown. Jugan also made an appearance at the 2013 Professional Wrestling Hall of Fame that same month in Amsterdam, New York. Additionally, Jugan was interviewed by the Ellwood City Ledger following the death of Doink the Clown, a one-time rival on the independent circuit and Deaf Wrestlefest regular, that summer.

=== Keystone State Wrestling Alliance (2013–2018) ===
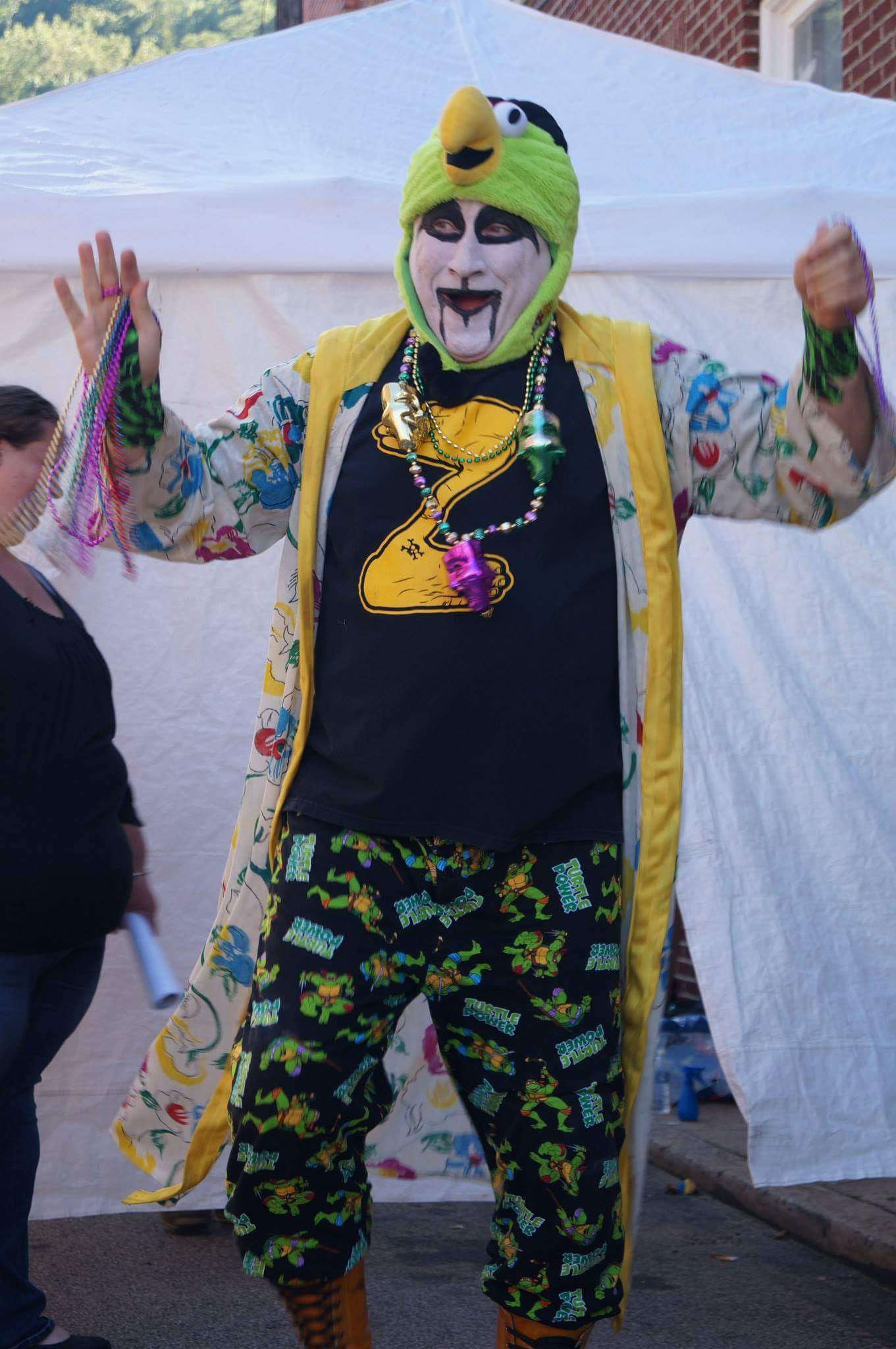
Lord Zoltan at Millvale Days, part of his second KSWA tenure as a face

Jugan and Justin Sane feuded with Nick Crane and Sniper in KSWA over the summer. On May 4, 2013, they lost to Crane and Sniper at "MAYhem 2013" via countout. Jugan and The Blood Beast defeated Crane and Sniper at "Heatwave Havoc" on June 15. A few weeks later, Jugan and Sane joined The Blood Beast to defeat Bobby Badfingers, "Nasty" Nick Crane and Sniper in a six-man tag team match at the July 6 Lawrenceville Fireworks Celebration in Arsenal Park. Jugan beat Nick Crane in a singles match at "Summertime Bruise 2013" on July 20. On August 3, Jugan reunited with longtime manager Mayor Mystery at the premier IWA Evolution show to wrestle Doink the Clown at the Youngstown Air Force Base in Vienna, Ohio. That same month, Jugan joined the KSWA's "Road to Fan Fest 2013" tour.

On August 24, Jugan lost to KSWA Heavyweight Champion Lou Martin at a fundraiser for PA Connecting Communities. Jugan's next stop on the tour was the two-day Millvale Days Celebration event in Millvale, Pennsylvania, on the weekend of September 13–14. The first night saw Jugan defeat Lou Martin in a "Loser Wears a Chicken Suit" match. He and Justin Sane beat The VIPs (Shawn Blanchard and Lou Martin) in a tag team match the following night; as per the stipulation, Martin was wearing a chicken suit for the latter bout. Jugan also beat Justin Sane at "Autumn Annihilation 2013" on October 12. On November 16, 2013, Jugan defeated Sniper at the Mario Ferraro Sr. Memorial Tournament in Sharpsburg, Pennsylvania. He was also scheduled to appear at the MATA Expo, an international social media trade show for people with hearing and speech disabilities, in Ontario, California, along with Amazing Kong and other wrestling stars. The event also co-hosted the Empire Wrestling Federation's "Inland Empire Invasion". He and Gangrel, however, were forced to pull out of the event. On March 29, 2014, Jugan entered the Keystone State Wrestling Alliance's 7th annual Joe Abby Memorial Tournament. He defeated The Bulldozer in the semi-finals and "Dr. Devastation" Lou Martin in the finals to win the tournament. On May 31 at "MAYhem 2014", Jugan teamed with Justin Sane and Bob Atlas to defeat Sniper, Blood Beast and "Nasty" Nick Crabe in a 6-man tag team match. On July 5, Zoltan appeared on Mid Ohio Valley Wrestling's "Cage Rage", its first-ever show in Marietta, Ohio. On July 28, Jugan defeated Lou Martin in a "Loser Wears a Chicken Suit" match at "Heat Wave Havoc 2014". KSWA Hall of Famer Ken Jugan (Lord Zoltan) faced another battle with cancer in 2018, but succeeded after surgery and follow-up procedures. A multi-promotional fundraising event was hosted in August, 2018. More than $5,300 was raised in the last Western Pennsylvania professional wrestling “Super Show” since Jugan's own Deaf Wrestlefest fundraisers. Lord Zoltan's last in-ring wrestling match was with the KSWA in February, 2018.

== Personal life ==
Jugan is divorced from his wife Rosa from Glassport, Pennsylvania. They have two sons, Adam and Blaise, who are deaf; both are alumni of the Western Pennsylvania School for the Deaf, where Deaf Wrestlefest was held. Jugan is retired as an administrative assistant for the Allegheny County Court of Common Pleas.

== Championships and accomplishments ==
- American Commonwealth Wrestling
  - ACW Keystone State Light Heavyweight Championship (2 times)
- American Championship Wrestling
  - ACW Light Heavyweight Championship (1 time)
- American States Wrestling Alliance
  - ASWA Ohio Junior Heavyweight Championship (1 time)
- Cauliflower Alley Club
  - Jason Sanderson Humanitarian Award (2013)
- Championship Wrestling Federation
  - CWF Heavyweight Championship (1 time)
  - CWF Tag Team Championship (2 times) – with Nick Crane and Justin Sane
- Great Lakes Wrestling Association
  - GLWA Junior Heavyweight Championship (1 time)
- International Wrestling Alliance
  - IWA Light Heavyweight Championship (1 time)
- International Wrestling Association
  - IWA Junior Heavyweight Championship (4 times)
- International Wrestling Federation
  - IWF Junior Heavyweight Championship (1 time)
- Keystone State Wrestling Alliance
  - KSWA Tag Team Championship (1 time) – with Justin Sane
  - KSWA Hall of Fame (Class of 2012)
  - Joe Abby Memorial Tournament (2014)
- Masterz of Mayhem
  - MOM North American Championship (1 time)
- Midwest Wrestling Association / Ohio All-Star Wrestling
  - MWA Junior Heavyweight Championship (1 time)
  - MWA Television Championship (1 time)
- North American Championship Wrestling
  - NACW Junior Heavyweight Championship (2 times)
- NWA West Virginia/Ohio
  - NWA West Virginia/Ohio Tag Team Championship (1 time) – with T. Rantula
- Pro Wrestling eXpress
  - PWX North American Heavyweight Championship (1 time)
- Pro Wrestling Illustrated
  - PWI ranked Lord Zoltan # 227 of the 500 best singles wrestlers of the PWI 500 in 1997
- Steel City Wrestling
  - SCW Junior Heavyweight Championship (1 time)
  - SCW Tag Team Championship (1 time) – with Shirley Doe
- Undisputed Championship Wrestling
  - UCW Classics Championship (1 time)
- United States Wrestling League
  - USWL Intercontiental Championship (1 time)
  - USWL Light Heavyweight Championship (2 times)
- Western Pennsylvania Pro Wrestling Hall of Fame
  - Class of 2010
