= Keystone State Wrestling Alliance =

American professional wrestling promotion

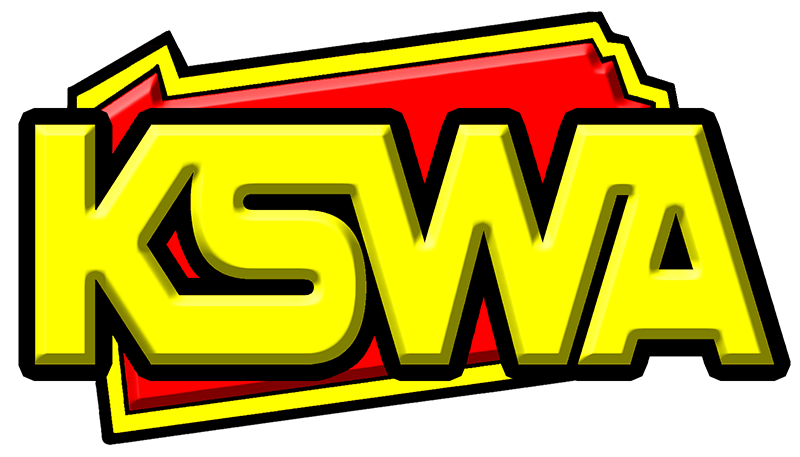
- Acronym: KSWA
- Founded: February 18, 2000
- Style: American wrestling
- Headquarters: Lawrenceville, Pennsylvania, U.S.
- Founder(s): Lou Zygmuncik; Shawn Blanchard
- Owner(s): Lou Zygmuncik (2000–2005); Bobby O (2005–Current)
- Website: www.kswa.net

The Keystone State Wrestling Alliance (KSWA) is a professional wrestling promotion that was founded in Pittsburgh, Pennsylvania in 2000 by Lou Zygmuncik and Shawn Blanchard. KSWA's longtime ring announcer Bobby O purchased the promotion in 2005. It is the only promotion based in Pittsburgh and one of several groups in the Pittsburgh metropolitan area including the International Wrestling Cartel and Pro Wrestling eXpress. It currently operates in the Lawrenceville section of Pittsburgh.

== History ==
The Keystone State Wrestling Alliance was established in Pittsburgh, Pennsylvania by Lou Zygmuncik and Shawn Blanchard in early 2000. Its debut show was held on February 18, 2000, at Peabody High School. The promotion slowly grew in popularity during the next few years. Bill Peduto, the mayor of Pittsburgh, has attended KSWA events. In 2005, the promotion was a feature cover story in both The Front and the Pittsburgh City Paper. Tony Norman of the Pittsburgh Post-Gazette wrote that the KSWA was "one of the purest and most entertaining examples of Americana in Pittsburgh".

In 2013, Pittsburgh Magazine called KSWA's live events one of the city's best tourist attractions in its "Best of the 'Burgh" column. A year later, the promotion was profiled by the Pittsburgh Post-Gazette, the Pittsburgh Tribune-Review, and The Wall Street Journal. In August 2016, CBS Pittsburgh named the KSWA among the best locally based independent promotions along with the International Wrestling Cartel, Pro Wrestling eXpress and Ring of Honor. KSWA's "Brawl Under the Bridge II", an outdoor show which took place underneath Homestead Grays Bridge, was covered by ABC News that summer. On July 22, 2017, Demolition Ax wrestled his last singles match at "Brawl Under the Bridge III".

=== Birth of the KSWA (2000–2005) ===
The organization held six more events after its debut and saw the heavyweight title change hand twice between Skippy Hawke and Shawn Blanchard later in the year. Most of these events were in Bloomfield, at the Bloomfield VFW, where their fan base began to build. The promotion expanded its area of influence within the city. On August 26, 2000, the KSWA began running events in Lawrenceville, at the Candlelight Lounge. On August 14, 2004, with an established fan base, KSWA found a home in the Lawrenceville Moose Lodge which was dubbed the "KSWA Arena".

In August 2005, "The Front" was the first media exposure for the organization, which focused on Anthony Alexander's victory over Biker Al for the Golden Triangle Championship. Later the same year, KSWA made its first appearance at Millvale days in September. The previous year, Hurricane Ivan severely flooded and damaged the small community by dumping 11 inches of rain in under 36 hours. Being the first fair post storm, the borough brought the KSWA in for an extra morale boost. WPXI featured parts of a match as part of their rebound coverage; From then on, the KSWA has appeared in Millvale annually in the parade and performing.

In November of the same year, the Pittsburgh City Paper now featured a show, bringing in even more fans the following show in December. The fan base, which was dubbed the "KSWA Krazies" by Ring Announcer Trapper Tom, began a tradition of donating toys to Allegheny County's "Holiday Project" campaign. This now annual show was dubbed "FanFest", and has brought thousands of toys to children in the Pittsburgh metropolitan area.

=== Modern era (2005–present) ===
The year 2006 began a turning point for the KSWA. Early in 2006, the City Paper featured the group once again, interviewing several fans. All told the paper how much they enjoyed the show after moving in from other areas. 2006 featured 13 cards, including "Clash Against Cancer" that drew more than 300 people the KSWA Arena to benefit cancer research. Quickly following that, more than 320 fans attended the 2nd Annual FanFest and Toy Drive. Organizers believe that this is the first time in which attendance topped 300 for two consecutive KSWA events.

"Battle Bowl" was introduced in January 2007. The annual Battle Royal event, brings in current and former, as well as surprise participants. Anthony Alexander won this first event, and quickly made the event a staple of the KSWA yearly rotation. During the rest of the 2007 calendar year, KSWA began appearing in more Pittsburgh area venues, Hosting a fundraiser in McKees Rocks and appeared twice at the nearby Obey House Tavern in the Crafton Heights section of the city. Several of the personalities also appeared on the "Humanity Matters" local cable TV show in the City of Pittsburgh. Once again, FanFest broke the KSWA's attendance record and ending in Anthony Alexander winning the Heavyweight Championship.

The KSWA held 14 events in 2008, including, on March 29, the first Joe Abby Memorial Tournament. It was named in honor of "Killer" Joe Abby, a mainstay on Studio Wrestling during the 1960s and 1970s. The Joe Abby Tournament became a way of honoring Pittsburgh's contributions to the pro wrestling industry, and saw Abby and Frank Durso, another Studio Wrestling regular, as the first wrestlers inducted into the KSWA Hall of Fame. Blanchard, with Durso in his corner, defeated Kris Kash in the finals of the inaugural Joe Abby Tournament. That same year, the KSWA begin its association with the Lawrenceville Community's yearly “Fireworks Celebration” at Arsenal Park. On December 6, 2008, Demolition Ax was brought in by the KSWA for its third annual FanFest supercard. In the main event, Ax and Kris Kash defeated "VIP" members Blanchard and Martin. In January 2009, the first sweepstakes was held during the "Battle Bowl". Shawn Blanchard was the winner and received a shot at the World title and will remain the reward for a few years. In March 2009, Demolition Ax made his KSWA return at the second annual Joe Abby Tournament. He was admitted as the third member of the KSWA Hall of Fame by owner Bobby O, however, Ax later lost his match against Shawn Blanchard later in the night.

On July 3, KSWA was invited back to the Lawrenceville Fireworks Celebration. "The Latin Assassin" took home $5,000 in a "Winner Take All" Battle Royal and Lord Zoltan made his debut in the KSWA ring. Zoltan, a long-time Pittsburgh-area independent wrestler, became one of the KSWA's biggest assets. The following day, the group traveled to Lake Latonka in Mercer County, PA. The event ended with Kris Kash chasing Lou Martin into the lake. In September, a fundraiser was held in the Ross Township Community Center. Called "Drop Kick Diabetes," the event raised funds for a Diabetic sufferer who had his legs amputated due to the disease. A then-record 406 fans attended the successful fundraiser. An undisclosed amount of money was raised for the man, but with the Chinese Auction and admission, it is estimated to be as much as 14,000 dollars.

Another first for regulars occurred in October, when the KSWA debuted in the "Teamster Temple", on Butler Street in the Lawrenceville neighborhood. This time the group was there to help raise funds for the St John Neuman's Catholic School. Which would be a taste of events to come. The same month, Demolition Ax re-appeared with his Demolition partner, Smash, to face off against the reigning Tag Team Champions, Lou Martin and Shawn Blanchard. They won the match, but unable to return, relinquished the titles the next event. The match was featured in Pro Wrestling Illustrated.

At FanFest, on December 5, 2009, Dominic DeNucci wrestled Frank Durso in DeNucci's first KSWA appearance. This match was later realized to have featured the two oldest participants professional wrestling history, and was enjoyed by fans of Pittsburgh's Studio Wrestling. DeNucci and Durso would again wrestle against each other in March 2010, as part of a six-man tag team match at the Joe Abby Memorial Tournament. The tournament also saw female wrestler Donna Christianello inducted into the Hall of Fame; Christianello died a slightly over a year later from complications of COPD. At the same show, then city councilman Bill Peduto declared March 27, 2010 to be "KSWA Day in the City of Pittsburgh."

In May 2010, the KSWA experimented with a series of internet TV shows but chose not to pursue the concept any further. On July 31, the group traveled to Monongahela, Pennsylvania for a fundraiser benefiting a local football organization. Later in 2012 they did the same for the Guyasuta youth football team and cheerleading association in Sharpsburg, PA. On November 6, 2010, the KSWA partnered with the Sharpsburg Volunteer Fire Department as a fundraiser. It eventually evolved into an annual event called the "Mario Ferraro Sr. Memorial Tournament". In the tag team main event of this tournament, titleholders Kris Kash and Shane Starr were accompanied to the ring by the manager of champions J. J. Dillon. However, as is customary for Dillon, the leader of The Four Horsemen, he turned on his team and hit one in the head with his loafer, then watched as Blanchard and Martin won the tag team championship.

During the March 26, 2011 Joe Abby Memorial Tournament, the KSWA inducted Bobby “Hurricane” Hunt and Ron Romano into the Hall of Fame. Before this event, Hunt had been the subject of a feature story in the “New Pittsburgh Courier.” In July of the same year, the KSWA would travel to Plum Borough for the town's annual Community Festival at Larry Mills Park. They were again invited in 2012, but did not perform due to inclement weather.

On December 3, an estimated 500-plus fans visited the KSWA Arena, nearing the building's permissible capacity to see a glimpse of George "The Animal" Steele. Tony Norman, columnist for the Pittsburgh Post-Gazette, appeared as a guest ring announcer along with Lanny Frattare. The Post-Gazette included an article written by Norman, detailing his experience. Earlier in the day, KSWA owners and wrestlers attended a roast of Dominic DeNucci in Greentree, PA as his induction into the Professional Wrestling Hall of Fame was announced, then in Amsterdam, New York. City Councilman Bill Peduto proclaimed December 3, 2011 as "Dominic DeNucci Day" in the City of Pittsburgh with an emotional bond to Studio Wrestling and his grandfather. Later that night, several attendees to the roast appeared at Fan Fest; Including DeNucci, Irish Davey O'Hannon, "Pretty Boy" Larry Sharpe, and Cody Michaels. "The Battman" Tony Marino made an appearance as well, restarting Lord Zoltan and Justin Sane's team "Party Gras" match, causing them to remain the KSWA tag team champions. Pittsburgh Police reported to the KSWA that an estimated 250 fans were turned away due to the Occupational Ordinance. Civil Air Patrol's Color Guard presented the Colors for the national anthem.

During the show of November 17, 2012, KSWA held its first fundraiser for Connecting Communities. This organization provides assistance to mentally disabled persons. They would later hold a second fundraiser.

December 8, 2012, during the annual FanFest, Bruno Sammartino inducted into the Hall of Fame by owner Bobby O. A few months later, Sammartino was also inducted into the WWE Hall of Fame in Madison Square Garden. Sammartino attended the event along with his friend, Domenic DeNucci, where a record setting attendance of 523 fans was recorded.

Tommy Faime, a KSWA "Original", was the first alumnus to be inducted, which occurred at the Joe Abby Tournament in 2013.

Prior to KSWA's "Summertime Bruise" 2013, Pittsburgh Magazine wrote an article featuring the upcoming show about their atmosphere. Later in the year, they would also be featured in the "Best of Pittsburgh" for "Best Place To Stand Around With a PBR."

On March 26, 2016, at the 9th annual Joe Abby Memorial Tournament, the KSWA held its 200th event. On September 10, 2016, U.S. Senator Pat Toomey presented the promoters with a special certificate recognizing the KSWA as the "longest-running professional wrestling organization in the city's history". It was similarly honored by Governor Tom Wolf.

=== Covid-19 ===
After the February 22, 2020 match, all subsequent KSWA events were cancelled, due to the COVID-19 pandemic, and Governor Tom Wolf's executive shut down order. Outdoor events resumed on May 14, 2021.

== Charity work ==
The promotion has long been involved with both Pittsburgh-based and international charity organizations. KSWA typically runs 15 shows for charity each year. Its shows have raised money for cystic fibrosis research, volunteer fire departments and local food banks. KSWA's year-end "Fan Fest" supercard, co-hosted by the Allegheny Holiday Project, is held for local children as a holiday toy drive and has collected an estimated 7,500 toys since 2005. Another annual event, "Brawl Under the Bridge", was started in the summer of 2015 as a benefit show for children in Allegheny County.

== Events ==
=== Joe Abby Memorial Tournament ===
The Joe Abby Memorial Tournament is an annual professional wrestling single-elimination tournament produced by the Keystone State Wrestling Alliance (KSWA) promotion, which has been held since 2008. It was briefly held as a tag team tournament from 2012 to 2013 and as a four-man tag team tournament from 2015 to 2016. It is held in memory of "Killer" Joe Abby, a Studio Wrestling star during the 1970s, who died from a heart attack on November 14, 1996.

Year	Name	Date	Location	Notes
2008	Shawn Blanchard	March 29, 2008	Lawrenceville, Pennsylvania	
2009	Lou Martin	March 28, 2009	Lawrenceville, Pennsylvania	
2010	The Latin Assassin	March 27, 2010	Lawrenceville, Pennsylvania	
2011	Mitch Napier	March 26, 2011	Lawrenceville, Pennsylvania	
2012	Del Douglas and The Jester	March 24, 2012	Lawrenceville, Pennsylvania	
2013	Tony Johnson and Jay Flash	March 23, 2013	Lawrenceville, Pennsylvania	
2014	Lord Zoltan	March 29, 2014	Lawrenceville, Pennsylvania	
2015	Team Faime (Tommy Faime, Del Douglas, Lou Martin and Jay Flash)	March 28, 2015	Lawrenceville, Pennsylvania	
2016	Team Faime (Tommy Faime, Bobby Badfingers, Vinnie Stone and Jay Flash)	March 26, 2016	Lawrenceville, Pennsylvania	
2017	Anthony Alexander	March 25, 2017	Lawrenceville, Pennsylvania	

=== Mario Ferraro Sr. Memorial Tournament ===
The Mario Ferraro Sr. Memorial Tournament is an annual professional wrestling single-elimination tournament produced by the Keystone State Wrestling Alliance (KSWA) promotion, which has been held since 2013. It is held in memory of Mario Ferraro Sr., a local Pittsburgh wrestling fan, who died on July 9, 2013.

Year	Name	Date	Location	Notes
2013	Kris Kash	November 16, 2013	Sharpsburg, Pennsylvania	
2014	Lou Martin	November 8, 2014	Sharpsburg, Pennsylvania	
2015	Lord Zoltan	November 7, 2015	Sharpsburg, Pennsylvania	
2016	Mitch Napier	November 12, 2016	Sharpsburg, Pennsylvania	

=== Fan Fest ===
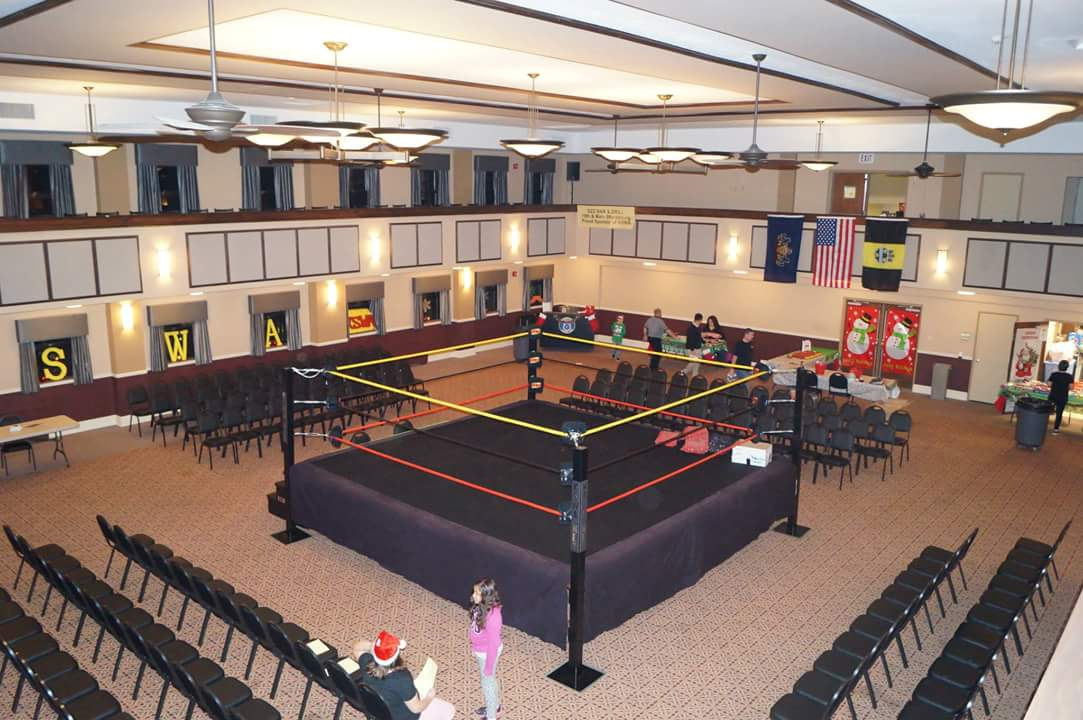
The KSWA ring prior 2015 Fan Fest

Every December, KSWA holds its annual "Fan Fest". Comparable to the larger organization WWE's WrestleMania, it draws their largest crowd and many championship opportunities and feuds build to this event. The event has Chinese auction raffles, giveaways, and a visit usually, a visit from Santa Claus. This event also hosts "big ticket names," and routinely draws more than 500 people. Fan Fest, which is co-hosted by the Allegheny Holiday Project, is held for local children as a holiday toy drive and has collected an estimated 7,500 toys since 2005.

=== Millvale Days ===
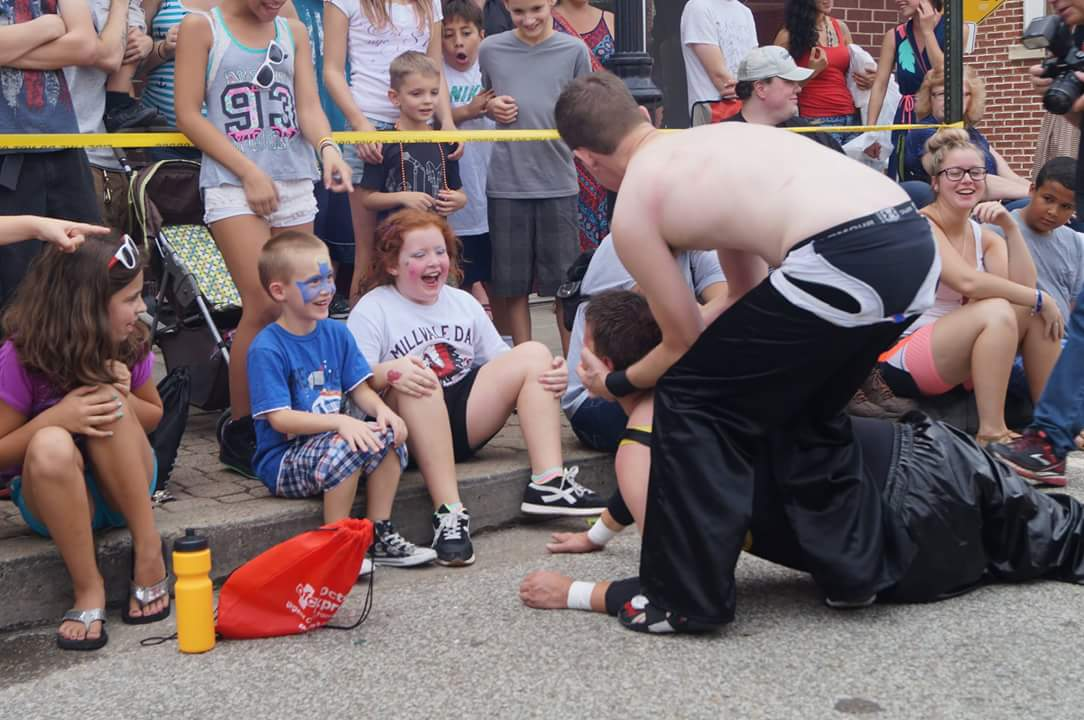
Kris Kash battling Lou Martin at Millvale Days

Every September, the KSWA has been invited to Millvale Days, a community street fair held on Grant Street for a weekend. The KSWA performs Friday and Saturday nights on the street, drawing large crowds every time due to the high risk of performing on the streets. The second day, usually a Saturday, ends in a "Battle Royal" where the winner is crowned "The King of Millvale". Wrestler "The King" Del Douglas is the self-proclaimed "King of Millvale" after being the reigning champion of the event for several years since KSWA's first appearance at the fair.

=== Brawl Under the Bridge ===
Starting in 2015, the KSWA has been invited to Homestead to participate in their street fair, which features the ring set up under the Homestead Grays Bridge, generating the name "Brawl Under the Bridge". The event was featured in a spot on ABC News by Michael Koenigs as he cycled across America. Wrestler Nikolai Volkoff, who began his professional wrestling career in Pittsburgh as a "Mongol," sang "God Bless America" before the event, was interviewed by Koenigs, was a featured guest.

In 2017, Bill Eadie (Demolition Ax) wrestled in his last match as a single's competitor, against KSWA mainstay Shawn Blanchard. The contest was for the "Brawl Under The Bridge" championship. Eadie received a proclamation from Governor Tom Wolf, recognizing his career, and Demolition Ax won the "Brawl Under The Bridge" Championship.

== KSWA Hall of Fame ==
The KSWA Hall of Fame is an American professional wrestling hall of fame maintained by the Pittsburgh-based promotion Keystone State Wrestling Alliance (KSWA). It was established in 2008 to honor wrestlers who have wrestled for the promotion and select wrestling personalities who have made significant contributions to professional wrestling in Pittsburgh and the Northeastern United States. The KSWA Hall of Fame has become the de facto "Pittsburgh Pro Wrestling Hall of Fame."

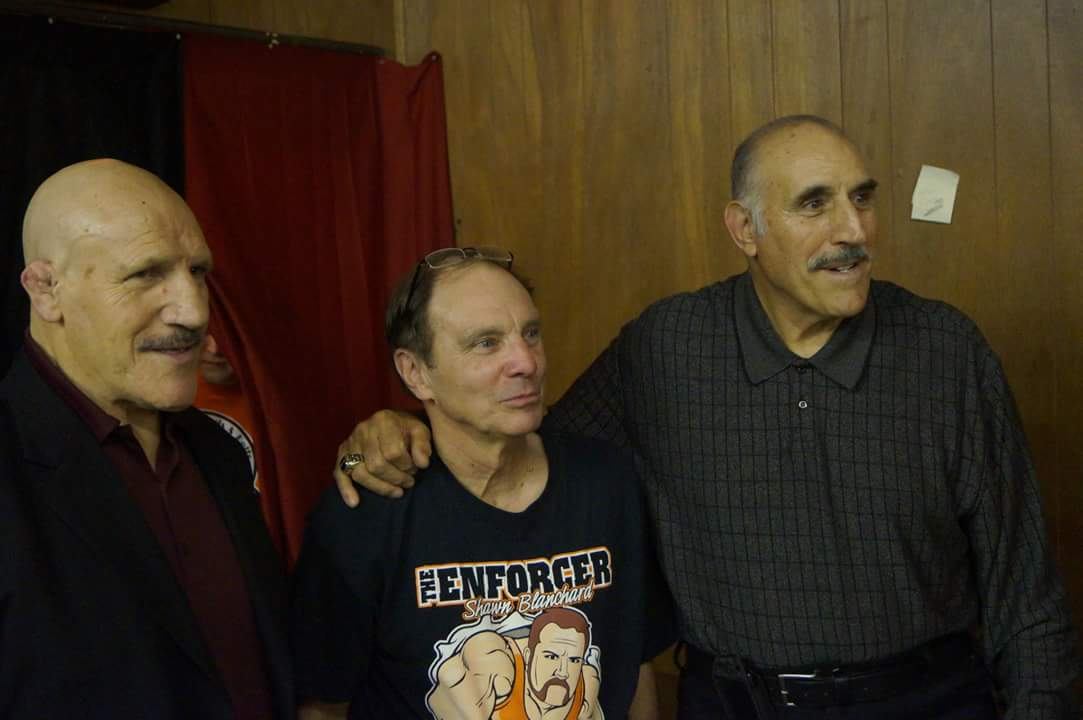
Hall of Famers from left to right, Bruno Sammartino, Howard Kernats and Dominic DeNucci

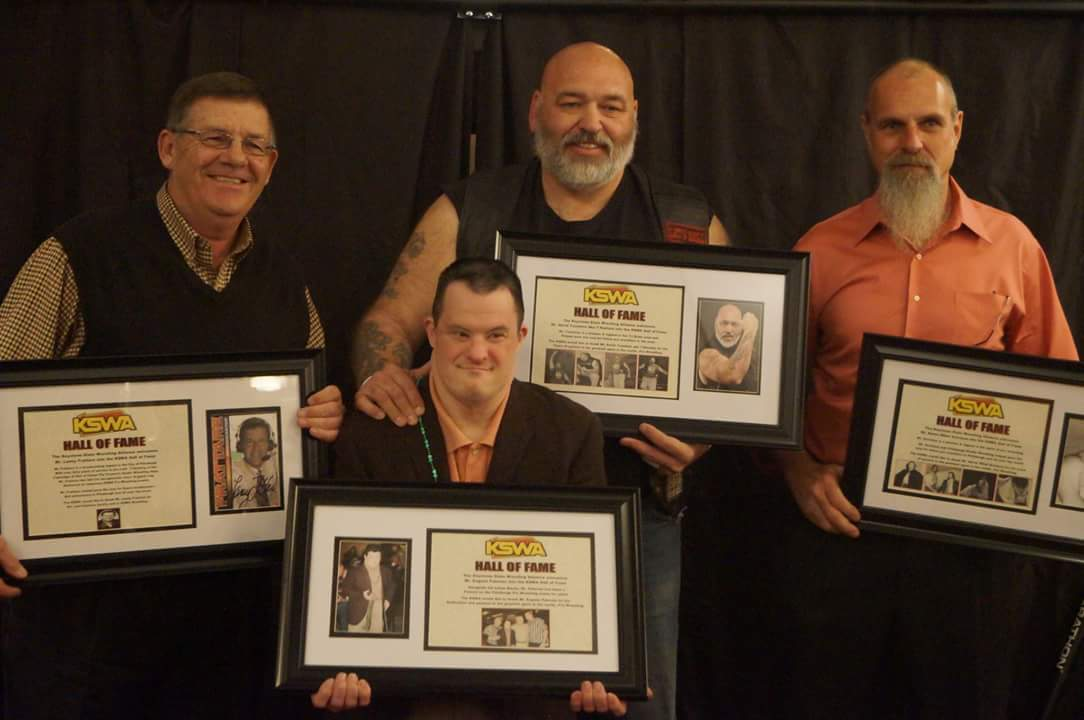
Hall of Fame class of 2016, left to right: Lanny Frattare, Eugene Palermo, T. Rantula, and Baron Mikel Scicluna's son, Mike

Inductees

#	Year	Ring name (Birth name) (Note: Entries without a birth name indicates that the inductee did not perform under a ring name.)	Notes (Note: This section mainly lists the major accomplishments of each inductee.)
1	2008	Joe Abby	Posthumous induction; first inductee; Studio Wrestling staple; local businessman
2	2008	Frank Durso	Studio Wrestling staple; advisor to the VIPs
3	2009	Demolition Ax (Bill Eadie)	Brownsville, PA native; began career in Pittsburgh; fame as The Masked Superstar & Demolition; KSWA Tag Team Champion
4	2010	Donna Christantello	Most influential female wrestler from Pittsburgh
5	2010	Dominic DeNucci	Multi-time champion and trainer; Italian immigrant who made Pittsburgh home
6	2011	Ron Romano	Posthumous induction; Studio Wrestling staple
7	2011	Bobby "Hurricane" Hunt	Charismatic high-flier, Studio Wrestling staple; Pittsburgher
8	2012	Bruno Sammartino	"The Living Legend"; multi-time champion; Italian immigrant who made Pittsburgh home
9	2012	Lord Zoltan (Ken Jugan)	Multi-time champion; often called the most important Indy Wrestler to come from Western PA
10	2012	Howard Kernats	"Unofficial" photographer
11	2013	George "The Animal" Steele (William Myers)	Innovator; one of Bruno Sammartino's greatest foes; became a beloved fan favorite
12	2013	Bucky Palermo	Studio Wrestling referee; shoe-maker; businessman; father of Eugene Palermo
13	2013	Johnny Valiant (John Sullivan)	Pittsburgher who found great fame as wrestler and manager
14	2013	Tommy Faime (Tom Dobbins)	Former KSWA Heavyweight Champion; first "KSWA Original" to be inducted
15	2014	Chuck Martoni	Studio Wrestling wrestler who earned greater importance as local politician and leader
16	2014	Bill Cardille	Synonymous with WPXI's "Studio Wrestling" as broadcaster and personality
17	2014	Johnny De Fazio	"Jumpin'" Johnny DeFazio; a Studio Wrestling fan favorite; equaled his fame as local union leader and politician
18	2015	Big Bully Busick (Nick Busick)	Weirton, West Virginia native who began his wrestling career in Pittsburgh; multi-time champion, powerlifter and motivational speaker
19	2015	J. J. Dillon (James Morrison)	Credits Pittsburgh for his start in wrestling; legendary leader of the 4-Horseman; has managed Shawn Blanchard to KSWA Championship
20	2016	Lanny Frattare	Pittsburgh Pirates radio announcer who frequents events and guest ring announces
21	2016	Eugene Palermo	Son of Bucky Palermo; valet and "second" to many wrestlers over the years
22	2016	Baron Mikel Scicluna	One of Studio Wrestling and Pittsburgh's most-feared veterans; once defeated Bruno Sammartino via DQ
23	2016	T. Rantula (David Younkins)	One of the region's most-accomplished "giants"; wrestled for ECW, WCW, WWE; ran own promotion Far North
24	2017	Bill Apter	one of the industry's leading journalists, photographers and personalities
25	2017	Pie Traynor	Major League Baseball Hall of Famer who became a Pittsburgh Sports broadcaster and Studio Wrestling pitchman.
26	2017	Frank Holtz	"The Fighting Cop From Carnegie"; a Studio Wrestling fan favorite; real-life police officer
27	2017	Joe Perri	Manager of "The Gentleman's Club" and "International Thugs"; "Kommissioner" and sometimes match maker
28	2018	Brian Hildebrand	Referee, Inducted posthumuously
29	2018	Shawn Patrick	Referee
30	2018	Angie Minelli	
31	2018	Cody Michaels	
32	2019	Preston Steele	5 times International Wrestling Association Intercontinental Champion
33	2019	Steve Novak	
34	2019	"Nasty" Nick Crane	
35	2020	Bobby Badfingers	
36	2020	Mike Malachi	
37	2020	Tom Davenport	
38	2020	Mike Malachi, Bobby O and Bob Badfingers	
39	2021	Ace Freeman	
40	2021	La Lucha	
41	2021	Eddie Faieta	
42	2021	The Sicilians (Tony Altomare and Lou Albano)	
43	2021	Tony Marino	
44	2022	Dennis Gregory	
44	2022	Andy "Kid" DePaul	
45	2022	Bubba the Bulldog	
46	2022	Dennis Gregory	
47	2022	Mayor Mystery	
48	2023	“The Beast” Ken Cerminara	
49	2023	Geeto Mongol (Newton Tattrie)	
50	2023	“Irish” Red Walsh	
51	2023	“Mad Dog” Tony Lutz	
52	2023	T.C. Reynolds	

== Championships ==
=== Current championships ===
The KSWA currently has four regular Championship Titles and one annual title.

Championship	Notes
KSWA Heavyweight Championship	The heavyweight title of the KSWA; regarded as the "Most Prestigious Single's Title In The Commonwealth"
KSWA Tag Team Championship	The tag team title of the KSWA
KSWA Golden Triangle Championship	Represents the city of Pittsburgh
KSWA Five Star Championship	The theoretical home of "Five-Star" matches The title was established in 2010 as the promotion's junior heavyweight championship and was defended until 2012.
KSWA "Brawl Under the Bridge" Championship	Special Championship awarded for the "Brawl Under the Bridge" event

=== Former championships ===
Championship	Notes
KSWA Pittsburgh Heavyweight Championship	The title was established in 2001 and defended through the year.
KSWA International Heavyweight Championship	The title was established in 2002 and defended through the year.
KSWA Tri-State Heavyweight Championship	The title was established in 2003 and defended until 2006.

== Sources ==
This article incorporates text from a free content work. Licensed under CC-By-SA 3.0 (license statement/permission). Text taken from From Butler Street to Wall Street: How the KSWA Became the Toast of America's Biggest Newspaper, Thomas Leturgey, Patch.com.
