= Death of Michael Rosenblum =

Missing person case from 1980 that ended as unsolved death 12 years later

- Michael Rosenblum around the time of his disappearance
- Date: February 14, 1980 (legally)
- Location: Baldwin Pennsylvania, U.S.
- First reporter: Hiker who found skull fragment in 1992
- Burial: Beth Shalom Cemetery, Pittsburgh, Pennsylvania, U.S.

Michael Rosenblum was an American man who died under mysterious circumstances in Baldwin, Pennsylvania, on February 14, 1980. A skull fragment which was eventually determined to have belonged to Rosenblum was found twelve years later in a wooded area of Baldwin, near the gas station where he had last been seen. The exact circumstances of Rosenblum's death remain disputed, with his father Maurice alleging foul play on the part of the Baldwin Borough Police Department (BBPD). The case elicited local and national media attention, including an extensive investigation by Pittsburgh Magazine in 1988 which resulted in a libel suit by two Baldwin police officers, despite the Baldwin police's refusal to cooperate with them.

== Background ==
=== Michael Rosenblum ===
Michael Rosenblum was born in Pittsburgh, Pennsylvania, in 1954, the only son of Barbara and Maurice Rosenblum. In his late teens, Michael engaged in alcohol and substance abuse, which led to frequent and sometimes violent brushes with local law enforcement. While undergoing drug rehabilitation at the Western Psychiatric Institute, Michael met Lisa Sharer, a former Playboy bunny from Baldwin. Michael had become romantically involved with Sharer, then estranged from her second husband, by the time both were released.

=== Baldwin police ===
At the beginning of 1980, Aldo Gaburri had been chief of the Baldwin Borough Police Department (BBPD) for the previous six years. Gaburri owned four properties in the borough and a 207-acre (84 ha) lot in rural Gilmore Township, south of the Pittsburgh metropolitan area. He also reportedly had a close relationship with the borough's mayor, Samuel McPherson, that reportedly extended to him dismissing traffic tickets at McPherson's request and covering up a traffic accident involving McPherson's son. The BBPD's officers were divided in their opinion of Gaburri, with some viewing him as most concerned with keeping his job and refusing to admit mistakes. "When you cross the boundary from Pittsburgh into Baldwin," one sergeant told Pittsburgh Magazine in 1988, "you leave the real world of law enforcement far behind you."

== Disappearance ==
After finishing the drug rehab program on January 10, 1980, Michael returned to his parents' house. On February 13, suspecting her son was using drugs again, Michael's mother Barbara searched his room and found a container of pills. Following an argument, Michael was told to leave the house. Michael visited Sharer and took her out to a local nightclub, then returned with her to her adoptive mother's house in Whitehall, southeast of Pittsburgh. He woke up with some residual effects from drugs he had taken the night before; Sharer took him to a local hospital at 10 a.m., urging him to check himself in as his eyes appeared to be regularly rolling back in his head. Michael refused; staff at the hospital recalled that he did not seem impaired at this time although they did strongly suggest he check in. He ended the argument by walking out.

The couple, along with Sharer's three-year-old daughter, left together in Sharer's Pontiac Sunbird heading north on Pennsylvania Route 885, intending to take the Homestead Grays Bridge towards the Rosenblum home, where Michael had decided to return. He had also scheduled a 12:30 p.m. meeting in downtown Pittsburgh with the lawyer he had hired to represent him in the speeding-ticket case. After Sharer drove over a curb when she turned to enter Homestead, she pulled into a gas station on Main Street in West Homestead to get out and see if she had gotten a flat tire in the process.

Michael got out as well, apparently angered by her careless driving. The two argued loudly enough to prompt the gas station owner to call the police, but then Michael decided he would drive, and got into the driver's seat. After taking control of the vehicle, he backed it into a telephone pole's guy wire. Before Sharer could resume the argument, he ordered her and her daughter out of the car.

The two did not try to re-enter the Sunbird. Michael told them to meet him at his mother's house; they instead hitchhiked back to Oakland in the city, where Sharer checked herself back into Western. Michael drove off at 11:35 a.m. There were no confirmed sightings of him alive after that.

== Initial investigation ==
Within an hour Sharer's Sunbird was reported as abandoned in the westbound lane of East Carson Street, a stretch of Pennsylvania Route 837 between two sets of railroad tracks along the south bank of the Monongahela River below a wooded bluff in a discontinuous, uninhabited section of Baldwin a quarter-mile (400 m) west of the Glenwood Bridge. At 12:24 p.m. two borough police officers, Chester Lombardi and Robert Weber, arrived on the scene.

Lombardi and Weber noted that the vehicle's engine was cold and its keys were missing. Both left side tires were shredded beyond repair; the vehicle had apparently been operated on its rims after the tires were damaged since the rims were also severely damaged. The interior of the car was filled with assorted items, including hundreds of photographs, to the extent that Weber gave up searching its contents shortly after he started. Weber radioed in the car's license plate number and Sharer was identified as the owner. Weber then requested a tow. While he and Lombardi waited another Baldwin officer, Sgt. Thomas Morse, drove by and inquired what they were doing. The tow truck arrived shortly afterwards and took the Sunbird to a nearby garage where the Baldwin police kept impounded vehicles.

=== Pittsburgh police ===
The following day Sharer called Barbara Rosenblum and told her that Michael had not returned; as far she knew, he still had the Sunbird. While Maurice believed he would return within a day or two or call within that time, Barbara immediately feared Michael had been harmed, noting that it was uncharacteristic of him to not notify them of his plans beforehand. She called the Pittsburgh police and reported him missing.

Capt. Theresa Rocco, head of the department's missing persons unit, immediately began a search, focusing on finding the Sunbird first. Eventually she would reach out to police in every state and major city. Maurice began his own search, calling old friends of his son as far away as California to see if Michael had gone there. He offered a reward for information and took time off from his business to distribute flyers.

=== Rediscovery of vehicle ===
The search for the vehicle ended in late May, when the owner of the shop where it had been parked sought a salvage permit from the state. When he learned the car had been reported stolen, he called the police. Morse called Sharer, who in turn passed the news to Rocco. She went with two city detectives and Maurice Rosenblum to see Gaburri.

Baldwin police records showed that the Sunbird had been there since the day Michael had disappeared. Rocco demanded to know why Sharer had not been told this even though the car had been traced to her. Gaburri told them he personally had not known the car was there until that day, but said his department had indeed sent her a letter the following day, but that it had "probably burned in a mailbox fire."

A week later they pulled from their files a letter to Sharer dated February 15; she maintained she had never received it. The police record of the car's towing has a notation scrawled on it: "Gallagher notified ant" [sic], referring to Patrick Gallagher, the dispatcher on duty that day. The handwriting was later found to be Gaburri's. Sharer did not have an aunt.

A late June story in the Pittsburgh Press about the case, with extensive information about the troubled pasts of both Michael Rosenblum and Sharer, was illustrated in part with a photograph of Sharer. She testified in a deposition the following year that the photo was taken from one of the albums in her car. It had not been in her car when it was returned to her.

Noreen Heckmann, the reporter who wrote the story, said later she had received most of the information in the story, including the photograph, from Gaburri. An interdepartmental memo also said that Baldwin officer Warren Cooley gave her additional information. Both he and the chief later testified that they had had no knowledge that Sharer's Sunbird was in the police impound lot, much less visited it, during the three months it was there.

=== Search of area ===
The following day, Gaburri ordered a search of the area around where the vehicle had been found on River Road back in February. Searchers, largely drawn from the borough's volunteer fire department and the county police, spent three hours looking over a very small area in the immediate vicinity, between the road and the river. They were assisted by scuba divers that Maurice Rosenblum had hired to look in the river, and a helicopter a client had loaned Maurice which searched from the air.

One of Baldwin's police officers, Skippy Dobson, was also a firefighter and on the team that day. Dobson had been working the dispatch console the day Michael Rosenblum disappeared. According to Dobson, he and other searchers asked more than once if they could search either further downstream or on the south side of the road, a wooded area with several ravines known as the Forty Acres (now known as Hays Woods). Gaburri refused to allow them to do so, saying that Maurice Rosenblum had wanted only the smaller area searched.

=== Claim of robbery involvement ===
A week later Gaburri called Rocco with news that at first convinced her that the search for Michael might be coming to an end. Witnesses in the robbery of a Baldwin drugstore had identified Michael as the suspect, an identification Gaburri found implausible.

Records stated that Baldwin officer Warren Cooley had created a facial composite of the suspect the day after the crime. The image closely resembled the one of Michael Rosenblum on the many flyers his father had handed out and posted all over the Pittsburgh area. There was no information on the composite itself to indicate when it was made, or by whom. Also, the witnesses had described the robber as wearing out-sized mirrored sunglasses, but the composite did not depict them.

Rocco and Maurice Rosenblum went to the drugstore and showed the witnesses photos of Michael; they did not recognize him. They also learned that Cooley had not spoken with a witness who had seen the getaway car. After learning of Rocco and Rosenblum's investigation, Cooley went to talk to both of the witnesses again with a full book of mug shots, but showed only one of them a picture of Michael.

In mid-July, Heckmann called Barbara Rosenblum one morning to let her know that the Baldwin police were issuing an arrest warrant for Michael for the robbery and she would be writing a story about that aspect of the case. She talked to Rocco, who called Gaburri; Maurice Rosenblum called the Press. The story was canceled and the warrant withdrawn, which Gaburri later said he did out of respect for the Rosenblums. Rocco was able to find a suspect who more accurately fit the description and had a similar car in the Butler jail north of Pittsburgh; he eventually confessed to the robbery. Records showed later that the Baldwin police had done nothing else to investigate the robbery between April and July.

== 1980s developments ==
No further leads on the case emerged after July. Developments up to that point had convinced Maurice Rosenblum that the Baldwin police knew more than they were saying about what had happened between February and May. He increased the size of the reward and bought billboard space near the site where the Sunbird was found.

For the next two years Maurice largely neglected his business to focus on the search. Sometimes he flew to other parts of the country on short notice to follow up leads as far away as California. He consulted mediums and psychics, and got permission to have a trap placed on Sharer's phone.

On the next two anniversaries of Michael's disappearance, Maurice received phone calls at home. Both callers told him that Michael had been arrested by the Baldwin police, then hung up without identifying themselves. Maurice followed up with classified ads in the newspapers urging them to take their information to the proper authorities and claim the reward money, but that never happened.

In the seven years following the disappearance and the Baldwin police's investigation, three of the officers involved died of heart attacks: Lombardi, who had responded to the abandoned car; Patrick Gallagher, the dispatcher who had been recorded as notifying Sharer's nonexistent aunt the day afterwards that the car had been towed; and Morse. The latter, a bodybuilder and former Mr. Pittsburgh who was nicknamed "Thumper" and described by fellow officers as "the departmental enforcer," had reportedly attempted suicide twice in the years before his death.

Sharer finalized her divorce from her husband and married for a third time. She left the Pittsburgh area with her husband and daughter a few years later in response to a bomb threat. Her family did not know where she had gone, saying she was "off the map," possibly having returned to her former home in Florida, or in Baltimore. Rosenblum's investigators were unable to find her.

== County and state investigations ==
Maurice Rosenblum lobbied for other law enforcement agencies at higher levels of government to look into both his son's disappearance (and, he had come to believe, death) and the Baldwin police's handling of it. He eventually got the county police to start an investigation. After some minimal early efforts, they lost their files. "I distinctly remembered being embarrassed by the whole situation," one detective said.

The Community Advocate Section of the state attorney general's office was next. Rosenblum later described their effort as "a tap dance." Their investigators did not interview most of the Baldwin police department's officers or employees. They did talk to Chief Gaburri, whom they quoted characterizing Rosenblum as "looking for a fall guy ... I don't know what his problem is, and I don't really care."

== State police investigation ==
In December 1986, the Rosenblums received another anonymous tip that yielded information which confirmed Maurice's view that the Baldwin police had been actively obstructing the investigation of their son's disappearance. A letter signed by "A Concerned Friend" sent to their home told them this, and suggested they would find proof if they spoke to Margaret Haslett, a former state trooper who had worked as a dispatcher for the Baldwin police after retiring. Maurice drove straight to Lakeville, Massachusetts, where she had moved, to talk with her.

Haslett told him that on the day the Sunbird had been found to have been in Baldwin's impound lot, Gaburri had been in a rage. She had been at work, and saw the chief order Fred Cappelli, the department's clerk, to type up a letter to Sharer saying that her car had been recovered, backdate it to February 15, and put it in the file to allow the police to claim it had been sent. She had not told either of the other investigations because she was afraid that she and Cappelli would get fired, and because they had never asked about the letter. As soon as he returned to Pittsburgh, Maurice contacted a longtime friend, state Rep. K. Leroy Irvis, Speaker of the Pennsylvania House of Representatives, and told him what he had learned. He and Irvis brought it to state Attorney General LeRoy Zimmerman, who referred it to the state police's Bureau of Criminal Investigation, an agency seen as beyond the reach of political influence. They talked to Cappelli, who not only confirmed Haslett's account but added that Gaburri had told him to forge Lombardi's signature on the letter after Lombardi refused to sign it.

Maurice recalled later that the investigation seemed at first to be making progress. An investigator told him early on that it seemed to him that Gaburri had lied; later it seemed that there were other criminal activities related to the Baldwin police and that a grand jury would be hearing testimony. But then things changed; the investigator told Maurice that it might be better if they allowed Gaburri to retire rather than face any charges. Later in the year the Attorney General's office dropped the case without saying why.

== Borough council investigation and disciplinary hearing ==
In July 1987, before the state investigation had been dropped, Maurice wrote to Baldwin's borough council, outlining what he knew and what he suspected about Gaburri's role in his son's disappearance and likely death. He specifically asked that they ask Cappelli about Haslett's allegations. Maurice told the Post-Gazette he was not interested in litigation or criminal charges. If Gaburri told the council what had really happened, Maurice promised to personally pay for him to retire.

Councilman Ken Guerra, chairman of the council's Public Safety Committee and the borough's volunteer fire chief, in which capacity he had participated in the 1980 search, read the letter and persuaded the council to open the investigation. He asked Cappelli, who confirmed Haslett's account. Guerra doubted that Cappelli would have been falsely implicating Gaburri, since he was easily pressured and not the type to initiate such actions. He asked the village solicitor, John Luke, a law partner of Mayor McPherson, a close Gaburri ally, to open an independent investigation. The council, in turn, retained the law firm of Robert J. Cindrich, a previous U.S. Attorney for the Western District of Pennsylvania.

Both sides gathered evidence in advance of a hearing before the council. Luke took depositions from Cappelli, who admitted everything he had been accused of but denied Gaburri's role, and George Galovich, another Baldwin officer who had been suspected of writing the letter to the Rosenblums. Private investigator Stephen Tercsak, a retired veteran of the Pittsburgh police who had worked for Rocco during the 1980 investigation, worked for the council at Cindrich's recommendation.

Because of his past involvement, Tercsak felt he had a personal stake in the case. (Note: He may not have been the only one. At one point, when Tercsak was interviewing a witness in Baldwin, someone drove nails into his car tires.) He began focusing on two officers still with Baldwin, Warren Cooley and Donald Miscenik. Tercsak came to believe that Michael Rosenblum had, as he had done on other occasions, fled when police attempted to pull him over, to the point that they might have responded by running the Sunbird off the road. Michael in turn might have attempted to fight the officers, and they beat him to death in retaliation and then disposed of the body.

At a hearing before the council at the end of September, Cindrich presented the council's witnesses, testifying under oath, while Luke cross-examined them. The proceeding was limited to the charge that Gaburri had ordered Cappelli to not only type the backdated letter but forge Lombardi's signature on it. Haslett repeated her account; Cappelli's testimony departed from his deposition by returning to what he had originally told Guerra, that he had done only what he admitted doing because the chief had ordered him to.

Galovich, as he had previously, denied that he had written the letter to the Rosenblums. But in his deposition he told Luke about corruption in the department. Galovich identified several officers whom he said were actively involved in an illegal gambling operation, and gave details of that operation. (Note: This testimony was disputed by the fellow officers he named. They said that while they suspected gambling at that location, or had heard rumors about it, but never had any firmer evidence than that, and never patronized it. Galovich maintained the truth of this allegation throughout the disciplinary proceedings against him the following year. An officer whose brother Galovich had named as running the gambling operation was promoted shortly afterwards.) He also said Cooley had been actively involved in taking payoffs to fix traffic tickets, as well as extorting those payments.

A majority of the council believed the charge against Gaburri had been proven and voted 5–2 to fire him in early October, informing him by letter that they believed his actions had impeded the search for Michael Rosenblum. He appealed to the borough's civil service commission, three of whose five members were close personal friends.

At the end of the year, the commission voted to overturn the firing and reinstate Gaburri. In its review of the case against the chief, it found Haslett's testimony to be hearsay at best and cited the differences between Cappelli's deposition and hearing testimony. The commission's secretary added personal remarks disparaging Rocco's search efforts, saying "she couldn't find a lost dog".

The police department fired Cappelli for the falsification of documents he had admitted to. The only officer to face any departmental discipline for the events of 1980 was Robert Weber, Lombardi's partner when the two came across Sharer's abandoned car that day. He was given a reprimand.

=== Disciplinary action against cooperating officer ===
Luke gave Gaburri a copy of Galovich's deposition in September 1987 after the officer testified. After the chief finished it, he called Galovich into his office and warned him that "[his] days [were] numbered".

In April 1988 a producer for Unsolved Mysteries called Galovich about a segment the show was considering doing on the Rosenblum case. He was out, so she left a message on the answering machine belonging to his roommate, another Baldwin officer who was loyal to Gaburri. The producer said her call was returned 15 minutes later by a man claiming to be Galovich who attempted to talk her and the program out of doing the segment (Galovich was later ruled out as having made the call; he suspected his roommate).

Almost immediately afterwards, Galovich was suspended on the grounds that he had lied to Luke during his deposition when he said he had no knowledge of Haslett's role in the case. Specifically, he had initially said he had no idea how Haslett got to the Pittsburgh area, but shortly thereafter admitted he had picked her up at the airport for the hearing. A concurrent 60-day suspension addressed an issue unrelated to the Rosenblum case, Galovich's alleged failure to follow up on a report of stolen checks that had been assigned to him. In April the borough council formally fired him. After the civil service commission sustained the firing Galovich sued and was reinstated in 1992, in addition to receiving a substantial settlement. (Note: Gaburri's successor fired Galovich again in 1995 after accusing him of using his access to the state police computer network for his private investigations. In 2004, while working as a Mars police officer he was charged with stealing $4,000 in fine money he had collected in his capacity as a state constable in Saxonburg; the following year he was sentenced to 90 days of house arrest after being convicted of theft by unlawful taking.)

== Media investigations ==
The coverage in Pittsburgh-area newspapers was augmented in the late 1980s by a lengthy article on the case in Pittsburgh Magazine and a segment on the nationally syndicated Unsolved Mysteries television show. Both would increase the amount of information publicly known about the case, and met with adverse reaction from the Baldwin police.

=== Pittsburgh Magazine article ===
Pittsburgh Magazine ran a cover story and editorial about the case in its May 1988 issue, recounting everything that had happened up to Gaburri's reinstatement. Terscak and Dobson shared with the author, James Harger, what led them to suspect Cooley and Miscenik in the case.

Dobson, who had been working dispatch on February 14, 1980, said that in addition to Morse, Lombardi, and Weber, all known to have been on River Road at midday, his radio logs showed that Cooley and Miscenik probably were as well. At 11:53 a.m., they called in to say they were leaving a magistrate's office on Pittsburgh's South Side, an area 5 miles (8 km) northwest along the river from where the Sunbird was found, to serve a warrant in McKeesport, 15 miles (24 km) to the southeast along the Monongahela. The only way to go there was along Route 837, River Road, Dobson told the magazine.

"Nobody said anything, but they drove right past where that car was sitting", Dobson noted. He had also found that records at McKeesport showed Cooley and Miscenik had never served the warrant. The logs did not show any radio activity involving the two until 2:30 p.m. "So where the hell were they at?" he asked.

Terscak said that other Baldwin officers believed the scenario he had developed during the investigation was likely as well, since Cooley "like[d] to beat a guy". Cooley, at the time facing a civil suit from two residents alleging he had attempted to extort money from them, refused to talk to Pittsburgh Magazine on the advice of his lawyers. Miscenik, whom Tercsak had said responded: "Is that right?" when told his fellow officers suspected he shared responsibility for Michael Rosenblum's death, told the magazine he was not responsible for Dobson's remarks, and no more.

The month after the story was published, Cooley and Miscenik sued the magazine's publisher, Harger, Galovich, and Tercsak for libel. They alleged the story contained false statements and recklessly implicated them in Rosenblum's disappearance, and that Harger personally had defamed them in a radio interview about it. The magazine defended the story and Harge called the allegations "ludicrous".

In 1990 Cooley and Miscenik settled on the day the case was to go to trial for an amount agreed to be between $50,000 and $75,000. A year after his September 1988 retirement, Gaburri sued the magazine and Harger as well; he dropped Maurice Rosenblum as a defendant shortly after filing the suit although he expected to consider calling him as a witness. At the time Cooley and Miscenik settled their suit Gaburri's was still pending.

=== Unsolved Mysteries segment ===
The NBC television network went ahead with filming its segment, which included interviews with both Maurice and Barbara Rosenblum, Tercsak, Haslett, Cappelli, and Thomas McFall of the borough's civil service commission, and re-enactments of events such as the discovery of the Sunbird on the stretch of River Road. The Pittsburgh police were able to provide some limited assistance since the Pittsburgh Marathon was the next day, and the sheriff's office did traffic control on River Road, but the Baldwin police refused to cooperate, with Gaburri ordering officers not to provide any traffic control or security and not to give interviews to the crew.

The segment aired in January 1989. After the program ended, a man who did not identify himself called the program's hotline from somewhere in the state of Washington and said that he had been held in the Baldwin police lock-up on the night of Michael Rosenblum's disappearance after he himself had been arrested that day for driving while intoxicated. He recalled that Michael had also been held in lock-up and had a gunshot wound to his leg and other injuries suggesting a beating; later officers came and took him to what the caller presumed would be a hospital.

Maurice Rosenblum, who by then had raised the reward to $25,000 and come to believe that Michael was dead, told the media he would attempt to find the caller. The Baldwin police said that there were no detainees in the lock-up that day, and reiterated that they had no knowledge of Michael's whereabouts.

== Discovery of bone fragments ==
In April 1988 a bone fragment and some scraps of clothing were found in the woods along the Monongahela near where the Sunbird had been recovered eight years earlier. At first the bones were thought to be human; they were later positively identified as those of an animal. The corduroy and shoe sole with them were consistent with the clothing Michael Rosenblum was wearing when Sharer saw him drive off.

As a result of this discovery, in late 1989 Maurice Rosenblum filed a petition to have his son declared legally dead. "If he were alive I would have expected to hear from him", he told the court. The petition was granted in early 1990, almost ten years after Michael had last been seen.

Two years later, in April 1992, a hiker in the woods further down the Monongahela, in the Forty Acres that Gaburri had kept the searchers from looking in, found a fragment of a human skull. In June the county coroner's office confirmed it was Michael Rosenblum's, after finding it matched the unique sinus print of head X-rays taken during his lifetime. Maurice noted that it was found on the same day he received the headstone he had ordered for what was to be an empty grave; a psychic he had once consulted, who had never been to Pittsburgh, drew a map that located Michael's body near where the skull was found, he added.

The cause of Michael's death could not be determined, but the family vowed to continue investigating. "I knew what the answer was for many years", Maurice said. "Who knows where it will go tomorrow?"

== See also ==
- Cold case
- Crime in Pennsylvania
- Police misconduct in the United States
- List of solved missing person cases (1980s)
- List of unsolved deaths
- List of Unsolved Mysteries episodes
