= List of Keystone State Wrestling Alliance Champions =

The Keystone State Wrestling Alliance is a professional wrestling promotion based out of Pittsburgh, Pennsylvania. Title reigns are determined by professional wrestling matches.

The KSWA currently has four regular Championship Titles and one annual title. KSWA Heavyweight Championship, KSWA Tag Team Championship, KSWA Golden Triangle Championship, KSWA Five Star Championship and the Annual KSWA "Brawl Under the Bridge" Championship. This article will break down every title holder to hold the current titles, as well as the 4 former titles.

== Current championships ==
=== KSWA Heavyweight Championship ===
Key

Reign	The reign number for the specific set of wrestlers listed
Event	The event promoted by the respective promotion in which the titles were won
N/A	The specific information is not known
—	Used for vacated reigns so as not to count it as an official reign

No.	Champion	Reign	Date	Days held	Location	Event	Notes	Ref.
1	Skippy Hawke	1	January 1, 2000	216	N/A	N/A	Awarded the title by the KSWA Board of Directors	
2	Shawn Blanchard	1	August 4, 2000	267	Bloomfield, Pennsylvania	Live event		
3	Tommy Faime	1	April 28, 2001	511	Bloomfield, Pennsylvania	Live event		
4	Shawn Blanchard	2	September 21, 2002	49	Bloomfield, Pennsylvania	Live event	This was a Triple Threat match, also involving Mike Malachi	
5	Mike Malachi	1	November 9, 2002	441	Bloomfield, Pennsylvania	Live event		
6	Lou Martin	1	January 24, 2004	798	Bloomfield, Pennsylvania	Revenge (2004)		
7	Shawn Blanchard	3	April 1, 2006	245	Lawrenceville, Pennsylvania	April Fools Anarchy: A Night of Deception		
8	La Lucha	1	December 2, 2006	49	Lawrenceville, Pennsylvania	FanFest/Toy Drive (2006)		
9	Shawn Blanchard	4	January 20, 2007	315	Lawrenceville, Pennsylvania	Revenge (2007)	This was a Triple Threat match, also involving Kris Kash	
10	Anthony Alexander	1	December 1, 2007	588	Lawrenceville, Pennsylvania	FanFest/Toy Drive (2007)		
11	Shawn Blanchard	5	July 11, 2009	294	Lawrenceville, Pennsylvania	Summertime Bruise (2009)		
12	The Latin Assassin	1	May 1, 2010	434	Lawrenceville, Pennsylvania	Mayhem		
13	Ali Kaida	1	July 9, 2011	147	Lawrenceville, Pennsylvania	Summertime Bruise (2011)		
14	Mitch Napier	1	December 3, 2011	<1	Lawrenceville, Pennsylvania	FanFest/Toy Drive (2011)	This was a Fatal Four-Way match, also involving The Latin Assassin and Shawn Blanchard	
15	Lou Martin	2	December 3, 2011	735	Lawrenceville, Pennsylvania	Fan Fest/Toy Drive (2011)		
16	Shane Starr	1	December 7, 2013	476	Lawrenceville, Pennsylvania	Fan Fest/Toy Drive (2013)		
17	Shawn Blanchard	6	March 28, 2015	252	Lawrenceville, Pennsylvania	Joe Abby Memorial Tournament (2015)		
18	Kris Kash	1	December 5, 2015	280	Lawrenceville, Pennsylvania	Fan Fest (2015)	This was a Championship Cavalcade match, also involving Shane Starr, Mitch Napier, and Lou Martin	
19	Jay Flash	1	September 10, 2016	84	Lawrenceville, Pennsylvania	Live event		
20	Mitch Napier	2	December 3, 2016	3,445+	Lawrenceville, Pennsylvania	FanFest/Toy Drive (2016)	This was a Triple Threat match, also involving Kris Kash	

=== KSWA Tag Team Championship ===
No.	Champions	Reign	Date	Days held	Location	Event	Notes	Ref(s)
1	The V.I.P.’s (Shawn Blanchard and Lou Martin)	1	May 20, 2000	98	Bloomfield, Pennsylvania	Live event	Defeated Great Toyota and Justin Sane in a tournament final.	
2	Skippy Hawke and Bob Thomas	1	August 26, 2000	6		Live event		
—	Vacated	1	September 1, 2000	N/A	N/A	N/A	Championship vacated when Skippy Hawke and Bob Thomas retired.	
3	La Lucha and Soulfighter	1	February 24, 2001	319	Bloomfield, Pennsylvania	Live event	Defeated Shane O’Shea & Great Toyota and The Prime Time Players in a Triple Threat match to win the vacant title.	
4	The Prime Time Players (Billy Rich and Anthony Alexander)	1	January 9, 2002	304	Bloomfield, Pennsylvania	Live event		
5	Sexual Harassment (JT Rodgers and Eric Xtasy)	1	November 9, 2002	189	Bloomfield, Pennsylvania	Live event	Defeated Billy Rich and Skippy Hawke, substituting for Anthony Alexander who was unable to appear due to travel problems.	
6	Tommy Faime and Mike Malachi	1	May 17, 2003	0	Bloomfield, Pennsylvania	Live event	Defeated JT Rodgers and Bob Atlas who was substituting for Eric Xtasy due to injury.	
7	Glamm Slamm Duo (QB Blitzz and Sam Slej)	1	May 17, 2003	140	Bloomfield, Pennsylvania	Live event		
8	The Ironside Crew (Shane O’Shea and Del Douglas)	1	October 4, 2003	112	Bloomfield, Pennsylvania	Live event		
9	Glamm Slamm Duo	2	January 24, 2004	203	Bloomfield, Pennsylvania	Revenge (2004)		
10	Biker Al and La Lucha	1	August 14, 2004	371/376	Lawrenceville, Pennsylvania	Mayhem at the Moose	Biker Al won the title in a battle royal. He chose La Lucha as his partner on October 9, 2004.	
11	Del Douglas and Tommy Faime	1	August 20, 2005	105	Lawrenceville, Pennsylvania	Summertime Bruise (2005)	Defeated La Lucha in a handicap match when The V.I.P.'s paid off Biker Al not to show up.	
12	Justin Sane and La Lucha	1	December 3, 2005	286	Lawrenceville, Pennsylvania	FanFest/Toy Drive (2005)	Defeated Douglas in a handicap match due to retirement of Tommy Faime	
13	The International Thugs (Mike Malachi and Ali Kaida)	1	September 15, 2006	442	Millvale, Pennsylvania	Millvale Days (2006)		
14	The Mexican Connection (La Lucha and Joey Quervo)	1	December 1, 2007	154	Lawrenceville, Pennsylvania	FanFest/Toy Drive (2007)		
15	The Latin Assassin and The Blood Beast	1	May 3, 2008	133	Lawrenceville, Pennsylvania	Mayhem (2008)	This was a Triple Threat match, also involving Biker Al and Vinnie Stone	
16	Best Team Ever (Alex Arcadian and Ric Rumskey)	1	September 13, 2008	0	Lawrenceville, Pennsylvania	A Night for Kody		
17	Vinnie Stone and Biker Al	1	September 13, 2008	84	Lawrenceville, Pennsylvania	A Night for Kody		
18	The Latin Assassin and The Blood Beast	2	December 6, 2008	266	Lawrenceville, Pennsylvania	FanFest/Toy Drive (2008)		
19	The V.I.P.’s (Lou Martin and Shane Starr)	1	August 29, 2009	20	Lawrenceville, Pennsylvania	When Worlds Collide (2009)		
20	Violence Inc. (Vinnie Stone and Ric Rumskey)	1	September 18, 2009	1	Millvale, Pennsylvania	Millvale Days (2009)		
21	The V.I.P.’s (Shawn Blanchard and Lou Martin)	2	September 19, 2009	21	Millvale, Pennsylvania	Millvale Days (2009)		
22	Demolition (Ax and Smash)	1	October 10, 2009	52	Lawrenceville, Pennsylvania	Autumn Annihilation		
—	Vacated	1	December 1, 2009	N/A	N/A	N/A	Demolition sends a letter to the KSWA offices, relinquishing the titles as they are unable to defend the belts in a timely manner.	
23	Violence Inc.	2	December 5, 2009	189	Lawrenceville, Pennsylvania	FanFest/Toy Drive (2009)	There was a gauntlet match for the vacant title, also involving Alex Arcadian & Anthony Alexander, The Blood Beast & The Bulldozer, Biker Al & Bobby Badfingers, and The V.I.P.’s (Lou Martin and Shane Starr)	
24	The Lost Boyz (Shane Starr and Kris Kash)	1	June 12, 2010	175	Lawrenceville, Pennsylvania	Heatwave Havoc		
25	The V.I.P.’s (Shawn Blanchard and Lou Martin)	3	December 4, 2010	210	Lawrenceville, Pennsylvania	FanFest/Toy Drive (2010)		
26	Party Gras (Justin Sane and Lord Zoltan)	1	July 2, 2011	525	Lawrenceville, Pennsylvania	Lawrenceville Fireworks Celebration (2011)		
27	Del Douglas and The Jester	1	December 8, 2012	252	Lawrenceville, Pennsylvania	FanFest/Toy Drive (2012)		
28	System Elite (Edric Everhart and Tyler Cross)	1	August 17, 2013	287	Lawrenceville, Pennsylvania	When Worlds Collide (2013)		
29	Jack Massacre and Mike Malachi	1	May 31, 2014	490	Lawrenceville, Pennsylvania	Mayhem (2014)		
30	The Mercenaries (Sniper and Nick Crane)	1	October 3, 2015	63	Lawrenceville, Pennsylvania	Live event		
31	The Lost Boyz	2	December 5, 2015	175	Lawrenceville, Pennsylvania	FanFest/Toy Drive (2015)		
32	The Spear Asylum (Bobby Badfingers and Vinnie Stone)	1	May 28, 2016	189	Lawrenceville, Pennsylvania	Live event		
33	The Jester and T. Rantula	1	December 3, 2016	3,445+	Lawrenceville, Pennsylvania	FanFest/Toy Drive (2016)		

=== KSWA Golden Triangle Championship ===
No.	Champion	Reign	Date	Days held	Location	Event	Notes	Ref.
1	Justin Sane	1	August 26, 2000	0	Lawrenceville, Pennsylvania	Live event	This was an 8-man "Final Elimination" battle royal. Justin Sane last eliminated Soulfighter to become the inaugural KSWA Golden Triangle Champion.	
2	Mike Malachi	1	August 26, 2000	21	Lawrenceville, Pennsylvania	Live event	Mike Malachi won by TKO when KSWA Commissioner Tommy Faime threw in the towel when Sane suffered an injury during the match.	
3	Justin Sane	2	September 16, 2000	42	Lawrenceville, Pennsylvania	Live event		
4	Jeff Lockhart	1	October 28, 2000	119	Bloomfield, Pennsylvania	Live event		
5	Lou Martin	1	February 24, 2001	329	Bloomfield, Pennsylvania	Live event		
6	Justin Sane	3	January 19, 2002	294	Bloomfield, Pennsylvania	Live event		
7	Jeff Lockhart	2	November 9, 2002	329	Bloomfield, Pennsylvania	Live event	This was a Triple Threat match, also involving The Latin Assassin	
—	Vacated	—	October 4, 2003	—	Bloomfield, Pennsylvania	Live event	Championship vacated when Jeff Lockhart retires	
8	The Latin Assassin	1	October 4, 2003	504	Bloomfield, Pennsylvania	Live event	Defeated Anthony Alexander	
9	Anthony Alexander	1	February 19, 2005	735	Lawrenceville, Pennsylvania	When Worlds Collide (2005)	On August 26, 2006, Alexander won a Fatal Four Way match to unify the KSWA Golden Triangle and Tri-State Championships.	
10	Justin Sane	4	February 24, 2007	280	Lawrenceville, Pennsylvania	The Aftermath (2007)	This was a Fatal Four Way match, also involving Ali Kaida and Mike Malachi	
11	Michael Cruz	1	December 1, 2007	84	Lawrenceville, Pennsylvania	FanFest/Toy Drive (2007)		
—	Vacated	—	February 23, 2008	—	Lawrenceville, Pennsylvania	Revenge (2008)	Championship vacated when Michael Cruz leaves the promotion	
12	Mike Malachi	2	February 23, 2008	287	Lawrenceville, Pennsylvania	Revenge (2008)	Defeated Lou Martin	
13	La Lucha	1	December 6, 2008	77	Lawrenceville, Pennsylvania	FanFest/Toy Drive (2008)		
14	Ali Kaida	1	February 21, 2009	70	Lawrenceville, Pennsylvania	Revenge (2009)		
15	Kris Kash	1	May 2, 2009	56	Lawrenceville, Pennsylvania	Mayhem (2009)		
16	Del Douglas	1	June 27, 2009	6	Pittsburgh, Pennsylvania	Krazy Tour (2009)		
17	Kris Kash	2	July 3, 2009	155	Lawrenceville, Pennsylvania	Lawrenceville Fireworks Celebration (2009)		
18	Del Douglas	2	December 5, 2009	273	Lawrenceville, Pennsylvania	FanFest/Toy Drive (2009)		
19	Justin Sane	5	September 4, 2010	14	Lawrenceville, Pennsylvania	Paul Sciullo Memorial Show		
20	Anthony Alexander	2	September 18, 2010	231	Millvale, Pennsylvania	Millvale Days (2010)		
—	Vacated	—	May 7, 2011	—	Lawrenceville, Pennsylvania	Mayhem (2011)	Anthony Alexander forfeited the title due to a shoulder injury.	
21	Frank Durso	1	May 7, 2011	0	Lawrenceville, Pennsylvania	Mayhem (2011)	This was a six-man tag team match with Frank Durso and The V.I.P.’s vs. Bobby Badfingers, Jay Flash and Justin Sane. Durso pinned to win the vacant title.	
22	Bobby Badfingers	1	May 7, 2011	210	Lawrenceville, Pennsylvania	Mayhem (2011)	This was a six-man tag team match with Bobby Badfingers, Jay Flash and Justin Sane vs. Frank Durso and The V.I.P.’s. Badfingers pinned Durso to win the title.	
23	Jay Flash	1	December 3, 2011	147	Lawrenceville, Pennsylvania	FanFest/Toy Drive (2011)		
24	The Blood Beast	1	April 28, 2012	139	Lawrenceville, Pennsylvania	Unsanctioned	This was a Triple Threat match, also involving Mitch Napier	
25	Shane Starr	1	September 14, 2012	526	Millvale, Pennsylvania	Millvale Days (2012)	On December 7, 2013, Starr defeated Lou Martin for the KSWA Heavyweight Championship.	
—	Vacated	—	February 22, 2014	—	Lawrenceville, Pennsylvania	Revenge (2014)	Championship vacated due to Shane Starr holding both the KSWA Heavyweight and Golden Triangle Championships.	
26	The Bulldozer	1	July 28, 2014	131	Lawrenceville, Pennsylvania	Heat Wave Havoc	Defeated The Jester in the finals of an 8-man tournament to win the vacant title.	
27	Kaida	2	December 6, 2014	182	Lawrenceville, Pennsylvania	FanFest/Toy Drive (2014)		
28	Lou Martin	2	June 6, 2015	413	Lawrenceville, Pennsylvania	Live event		
29	Shane Starr	2	July 23, 2016	133	Homestead, Pennsylvania	Brawl Under the Bridge 2		
30	Tommy Faime	1	December 3, 2016	3,445+	Lawrenceville, Pennsylvania	FanFest/Toy Drive (2016)		

=== KSWA Five Star Championship ===
No.	Champion	Reign	Date	Days held	Location	Event	Notes	Ref.
1	Tony Johnson	1	December 4, 2010	286	Lawrenceville, Pennsylvania	FanFest/Toy Drive (2010)	Defeated The Great Toyota, Jay Flash, JP Goulet, The Jester, and Drew Belanger in a 6 Pack Gauntlet match to become the inaugural KSWA Junior Heavyweight Champion.	
2	Del Douglas	1	September 16, 2011	1	Millvale, Pennsylvania	Millvale Days (2011)		
3	Tony Johnson	2	September 17, 2011	77	Millvale, Pennsylvania	Millvale Days (2011)		
4	Shane Starr	1	December 3, 2011	154	Lawrenceville, Pennsylvania	FanFest/Toy Drive (2011)	This was a gauntlet match, also involving Dave Diamond, Del Douglas, The Jester and Kris Kash.	
5	Jonny Axx	1	May 5, 2012	217	Bloomfield, Pennsylvania	Krazy Tour (2012)	On May 6, 2002, after Jonny Axx and his manager Mayor Mystery petitioned the KSWA Championship Committee to establish a weight class for junior heavyweights, the title was renamed: KSWA Five Star Championship.	
6	Kris Kash	1	December 8, 2012	252	Lawrenceville, Pennsylvania	FanFest/Toy Drive (2012)		
7	Mitch Napier	1	August 17, 2013	112	Lawrenceville, Pennsylvania	When Worlds Collide (2013)	This was a Triple Threat match, also involving J Ru	
8	Bobby Badfingers	2	December 7, 2013	364	Lawrenceville, Pennsylvania	FanFest/Toy Drive (2013)	This was a gauntlet match, also involving Del Douglas, Kris Kash and J Ru	
9	The Jester	1	December 6, 2014	175	Lawrenceville, Pennsylvania	FanFest/Toy Drive (2014)	This was a Fatal Four Way match, also involving The Blood Beast and Justin Sane	
10	Super Ginger	1	May 30, 2015	14	Pittsburgh, Pennsylvania	Krazy Tour (2015)	This was a Fatal Four Way match, also involving Jay Flash and Tony Johnson	
11	Nick Crane	1	June 13, 2015	37	Sharpsburg, Pennsylvania	Krazy Tour (2015)		
12	Super Ginger	2	July 20, 2015	33	Homestead, Pennsylvania	Brawl Under the Bridge		
13	Mitch Napier	2	August 22, 2015	301	Lawrenceville, Pennsylvania	Live event		
14	Kaida	1	June 18, 2016	25	Lawrenceville, Pennsylvania	Live event	This was a Triple Threat match, also involving Harley T. Morris	
—	Vacated	—	July 13, 2016	—	N/A	N/A	Kaida forfeited the title due to injury	
15	Harley T. Morris	1	July 23, 2016	71	Homestead, Pennsylvania	Brawl Under the Bridge 2	This was a Fatal Four Way match for the vacant title, also including Bob Atlas, Mitch Napier, and Justin Sane	
16	Ice Machine	1	October 2, 2016	13	Sewickley, Pennsylvania	Fam Com (2016)		
17	Harley T. Morris	1	October 15, 2016	161	Lawrenceville, Pennsylvania	Live event		
19	Justin Sane	1	March 25, 2017	99	Lawrenceville, Pennsylvania	Joe Abby Memorial Tournament (2017)		
20	Lord Zoltan	1	July 2, 2017	20	Lawrenceville, Pennsylvania	Lawrenceville Fireworks Celebration (2017)	This was a Triple Threat match, also involving Del Douglas	
21	Del Douglas	1	July 22, 2017	7	Homestead, Pennsylvania	Brawl Under the Bridge 3	This was a Triple Threat match, also involving Justin Sane	
22	Justin Sane	2	July 29, 2017	3,207+	Coraopolis, Pennsylvania	Live event	This was a Triple Threat match, also involving Lord Zoltan	

=== KSWA "Brawl Under the Bridge" Championship ===
No.	Champion	Reign	Date	Days held	Location	Event	Notes	Ref.
1	Kris Kash	1	July 23, 2016	294	Homestead, Pennsylvania	Brawl Under the Bridge 2	In a match sanctioned by KSWA owner Tommy Faime, Kash defeated Shawn Blanchard to become the inaugural KSWA "Brawl Under the Bridge" Champion	
2	Shawn Blanchard	1	May 13, 2017	70	Lawrenceville, Pennsylvania	Live event	This was a Fatal Four Way match, also involving Lou Martin and Shane Starr	
3	Demolition Ax	1	July 22, 2017	3,214+	Homestead, Pennsylvania	Brawl Under the Bridge 3		

== Former Championships ==
=== KSWA Pittsburgh Heavyweight Championship ===
No.	Champion	Reign	Date	Days held	Location	Event	Notes	Ref.
1	The Kazmanian Devil	1	January 26, 2001	257	Bloomfield, Pennsylvania	Live event	Defeated Anthony Alexander and Billy Rich in a Triple Threat match to become the inaugural KSWA International Champion.	
—	Vacated	—	October 10, 2001	—	N/A	N/A	Championship vacated when The Kazmanian Devil retires	
2	Shane O'Shea	1	January 19, 2002	175	Bloomfield, Pennsylvania	Live event	This was a Triple Threat match for the vacant title, also including Bob Atlas and The Great Toyota	
3	The Great Toyota	1	July 13, 2002	119	Bloomfield, Pennsylvania	Live event		
4	Bob Atlas	1	November 9, 2002	140	Bloomfield, Pennsylvania	Live event	On March 29, 2003, Atlas won a battle royal to unify the KSWA International and Pittsburgh Championships.	

=== KSWA International Heavyweight Championship ===
No.	Champion	Reign	Date	Days held	Location	Event	Notes	Ref.
1	Shadow Strike	1	March 2, 2002	136	Bloomfield, Pennsylvania	Live event	This was an 8-man "Final Elimination" battle royal.	
—	Vacated	—	July 16, 2002	—	N/A	N/A	Shadow Strike forfeited the title due to injury.	
2	La Lucha	1	September 21, 2002	189	Bloomfield, Pennsylvania	Live event	Defeated Joey Quervo	
3	Bob Atlas	1	March 29, 2003	<1	Bloomfield, Pennsylvania	Live event	This was a Keystone Karnage battle royal. The championship is unified with the KSWA Pittsburgh Heavyweight Championship and ceases to exist.	

=== KSWA Tri-State Heavyweight Championship ===
No.	Champion	Reign	Date	Days held	Location	Event	Notes	Ref.
1	Bob Atlas	1	March 29, 2003	189	Bloomfield, Pennsylvania	Live event	This was a battle royal to unify the KSWA International and Pittsburgh Championships.	
2	Billy Rich	1	October 4, 2003	264	Bloomfield, Pennsylvania	Live event		
3	Shawn Blanchard	1	June 24, 2004	51		Live event		
4	Bob Atlas	2	August 14, 2004	56	Lawrenceville, Pennsylvania	Mayhem at the Moose		
—	Vacated	—	October 9, 2004	—	Lawrenceville, Pennsylvania	Autumn Annihilation	Bob Atlas forfeited the title due to injury.	
5	Shawn Blanchard	2	October 9, 2004	49	Lawrenceville, Pennsylvania	Autumn Annihilation	This was a Final Elimination match for the vacant title, also including Ali Kaida, Bosco Baracus, Del Douglas, La Lucha, and Joey Quervo	
6	Justin Sane	1	November 27, 2004	196	Lawrenceville, Pennsylvania	November Pain		
7	The Latin Assassin	1	June 11, 2005	175	Lawrenceville, Pennsylvania	Heatwave Havoc		
8	Mike Malachi	1	December 3, 2005	119	Lawrenceville, Pennsylvania	FanFest/Toy Drive (2005)		
9	The Latin Assassin	2	April 1, 2006	70	Lawrenceville, Pennsylvania	April Fools Anarchy: A Night of Deception		
—	Vacated	—	June 10, 2006	—	N/A	N/A	The Latin Assassin forfeited the title due to injury.	
10	Anthony Alexander	1	August 26, 2006	<1	Lawrenceville, Pennsylvania	When Worlds Collide (2006)	This was a Fatal Four Way match, also including Michael Cruz, Mike Malachi and Deven Michaels. The championship is unified with the KSWA Golden Triangle Championship and ceases to exist.	
