= Andy DePaul =

Andy "Kid" DePaul (born Andrew A. DiPaolo; November 22, 1928 in Pittsburgh, Pennsylvania – September 6, 2014) was a noted amateur and professional boxer and referee. He has been the Pennsylvania State Athletic Commissioner for Western Pennsylvania since 1990. During his amateur boxing career, Andy won 82 of 92 amateur fights. In 1946 he was the 135 pound Dapper Dan Golden Gloves champion, and the 135 pound AAU AMA Champion. In 1947 he was the 135 pound and 147 pound Pittsburgh Golden Gloves champion and the 135 pound Eastern Golden Gloves champion, which was held in Madison Square Garden. He was also an AAU finalist in Boston. After he turned professional, he compiled a career record of 27 wins, 8 losses, 3 draws. In 1950 he was the ninth-ranked middleweight in the world.

After his professional boxing career ended, DePaul served as a referee for boxing and professional wrestling shows around the Pittsburgh area. He was a featured referee on the very popular Studio Wrestling program broadcast out of Pittsburgh on the old WIIC-TV Channel 11.

== Halls of fame ==
- Inducted into Pennsylvania Hall of Fame 1982
- Inducted into National Italian American Sports Hall of Fame 1986
- Inducted into Pennsylvania Golden Gloves Hall of Fame 2007

His induction ceremony into the Pennsylvania Golden Gloves Hall of Fame was held on Friday, April 20, 2007, at Heinz Field in Pittsburgh.
