= Frank Durso =

American professional wrestler (1937–2018)

Personal information
- Born: Frank N. Sciullo; January 30, 1937 Pittsburgh, Pennsylvania, U.S.
- Died: December 7, 2018 (aged 81) Pittsburgh, Pennsylvania, U.S.

Professional wrestling career
- Ring name: Frank Durso
- Billed height: 5 ft 9 in (175 cm)
- Billed weight: 240 lb (109 kg)
- Debut: 1961
- Retired: March 23, 2013

Frank N. Sciullo (January 30, 1937 – December 7, 2018) was an American professional wrestler who wrestled for the World Wide Wrestling Federation, Studio Wrestling and local Pittsburgh promotions.

== Professional wrestling career ==
Durso made his wrestling debut in 1961 for Studio Wrestling in Pittsburgh. In 1964, he made his debut for the World Wide Wrestling Federation (WWWF). He worked for the WWWF until retiring from wrestling in 1977. His biggest match of his career was on August 10, 1966, against WWWF Heavyweight Champion Bruno Sammartino in Philadelphia.

In 2006, at the age of 69, he returned to wrestling, working for the Pittsburgh independent promotion Keystone State Wrestling Alliance. He wrestled his final match for the promotion at age 76 when he teamed with Shawn Blanchard and Lou Martin to defeat Bobby O, Kris Kash, Shane Starr and Justin Sane.

== Death ==
On December 8, 2018, Durso died in Pittsburgh after a long illness. He was 81 years old.

== Championships and accomplishments ==
- Keystone State Wrestling Alliance
  - KSWA Golden Triangle Championship (1 time)
  - KSWA Hall of Fame (Class of 2008)
