= Studio Wrestling =

American TV wrestling show

Studio Wrestling was a live professional wrestling show broadcast from WIIC-TV Channel 11 in Pittsburgh every Saturday evening. In 1959, WIIC began broadcasting professional wrestling from their studio located in Fineview. The show was hosted by Bill Cardille through most of its run, although he was not the original host. The primary directors were Chuck Moyer and Jack Bleriot.

== Popularity ==
At one time, this show was considered one of the top wrestling shows in the United States. Even though the show started on Saturdays at 6 p.m., the lines started to form around the TV station at noon. The show was so popular that it revived the dying Pittsburgh wrestling market.

Promoter Joseph "Toots" Mondt went from promoting shows at a tiny North Side venue called "The Islam Grotto" to packing in tens of thousands of fans to outdoor shows at Forbes Field. In 1961, Mondt began using the newly built Pittsburgh Civic Arena to run indoor shows on a monthly basis. Even the referees such as Paddy Grimes, Izzy Moidel (who claimed to have once beat Rocky Marciano in an amateur boxing match), and Andy DePaul became local celebrities because of the show's huge audience. An elderly lady named Anna Buckalew, popularly known as Ringside Rosie, who always sat in the front row every Saturday, became well known. Pittsburgh Pirates Hall of Famer Pie Traynor later became part of the show as a commercial spokesman for the American Heating Company. His tag line was, "Who can? Ameri-CAN!!!"

== Cancellation ==
The show lasted until 1972. WIIC-TV's new GM David Chase did not think pro wrestling helped the station's image as a news source. He decided to cancel the show, which had once been the station's top rated show. The ratings had declined because wrestling had lost popularity in Pittsburgh, with some Civic Arena shows drawing fewer than 3,000 fans. The fact that Bruno Sammartino was no longer champion and was wrestling on a more limited schedule had a lot to do with this decline. A time change to a 4:30 start also caused some audience erosion. Around this time the Pittsburgh promotional office, sold by Newton Tattrie (Geeto Mongol) to a Buffalo-based promotion, struggled to remain an independent promotion. Studio Wrestling switched to WPGH-TV channel 53 with the shows being taped in Erie, Pennsylvania. In 1974, the show went off the air and was replaced by the WWWF's syndicated program. The WWWF (today the WWE) was able to claim Pittsburgh as part of its own since it was part of the National Wrestling Alliance at the time and Studio Wrestling was independent of the NWA.

Because of budget and storage concerns, weekly "reference" tapes from the live show were not saved. WIIC-TV re-used all tapes containing its original programming such as Studio Wrestling and Chiller Theatre. Videos of these programs are now very rare.

The Studio Wrestling theme song was "El Capitan" by John Philip Sousa.

== Local wrestlers (appearing on Studio Wrestling) ==
The list of wrestlers who appeared on the show reads like a who's who of American Pro Wrestling. Bruno Sammartino was undoubtedly the most popular and was able to help the WWWF to claim Pittsburgh as part of its territory as far as the NWA was concerned. Giant Baba wrestled on the show. George Steele (The Animal) got his start on the east coast by appearing on the show. Previously, Steele (real name: William James Meyers) had wrestled in his native Detroit in a mask as "The Student".

- Killer Joe Abbey, real name Joseph Abbenante (who also wrestled as the masked Red Demon)
- Billy Darnell
- Jumping Johnny De Fazio
- Dominic DeNucci
- Frank "Slip Mahoney" Durso
- Ace Freeman (real name: Zoltan Friedman)
- Fred "The Tiger" Geiger
- Frank "Carnegie Cop" Holtz
- Bobby "Hurricane" Hunt
- Zivko Kovacic
- Tony "The Battman" Marino (wore a full Batman outfit taking off his cape when he wrestled)
- Chuck Martoni (later became mayor of a Pittsburgh suburb-Swissvale)
- Ron Mattucci
- Carlos Milano
- "Polish" Pat Atlas
- Bepo Mongol (real name: Josip Perusovic) (Nikolai Volkoff)
- Geeto Mongol
- Ron Romano
- Bruno Sammartino (WWWF champion. In Pittsburgh, was announced as simply "World Champion".)
- John Valiant (John L. Sullivan) (real name: Thomas Sullivan)
- Chet Wallick
- Chief White Owl, real name George Dahmer
- Larry Zbyszko, real name Larry Whisler
- Baron Mikel Scicluna
- Haystacks Calhoun, real name William Dee Calhoun
