= Pittsburgh Magazine =

American lifestyle magazine

- October 2012 cover
- Editor: Virginia Linn
- Managing Editor: Sean Collier
- Food Editor: Kristy Locklin
- Categories: Lifestyle magazine
- Frequency: monthly
- Circulation: 23,086
- Publisher: Betsy Benson
- First issue: 1969
- Company: WiesnerMedia
- Based in: Pittsburgh, United States
- Language: English
- Website: pittsburghmagazine.com
- ISSN: 0194-8431
- OCLC: 850817460

Pittsburgh Magazine is a lifestyle magazine covering the Pittsburgh metropolitan area. It hosts an annual "40 Under 40" featuring prominent young Pittsburghers. It's known for listicles including Pittsburgh's 25 Best Restaurants, Best of the 'Burgh, Top Doctors, Top Dentists and annual City Guide. It is a member of the City and Regional Magazine Association (CRMA).

== About ==
The magazine was purchased in 1970 by WQED, which used the magazine as part of its pledge drives. By 1978, it was still losing money, but it had gained tax-exempt status through WQED. Allies of Richard Mellon Scaife, the owner of the rival Pittsburgh Tribune-Review and the Pittsburgher, investigated the financial status, with a possible eye toward challenging the tax-exempt status. In 1983, the magazine was drawn into a battle between staff members regarding WQED's involvement with Nancy Reagan's anti-drug campaign. In 1990, the magazine was the subject of a libel lawsuit brought by two police officers after publishing an article about the disappearance of a Pittsburgh man; the suit was settled for $75,000.

Amid significant staff turnover, former employees suggested that the growth of the magazine was stunted by its relationship with the financially distressed WQED. In October 1993, Sewickley native Christopher E. Fletcher was hired as editor. The magazine underwent a significant format re-design in 1994.

In 2009, the magazine was purchased by WiesnerMedia, a suburban Denver-based publishing company. A short time later, the offices were moved out of WQED's Oakland headquarters to new facilities on Washington's Landing.

In January 2010, the magazine launched its World Wide Web home: PittsburghMagazine.com, which includes daily and weekly blogs and e-media.

In 2016, the magazine launched a partnership with GiveGab for an annual charity-fundraising drive called Give Big Pittsburgh. It is a one-day event on Giving Tuesday, the annual American day of giving that follows Thanksgiving, Black Friday, and Cyber Monday. In 2017, Give Big Pittsburgh raised $1.5 million in a single day, topped in 2018 at $1.7 million, $1.6 million in 2019 and $2.7 million in 2020.
