= Nikolai Volkoff =

Croatian-American professional wrestler (1946–2018)

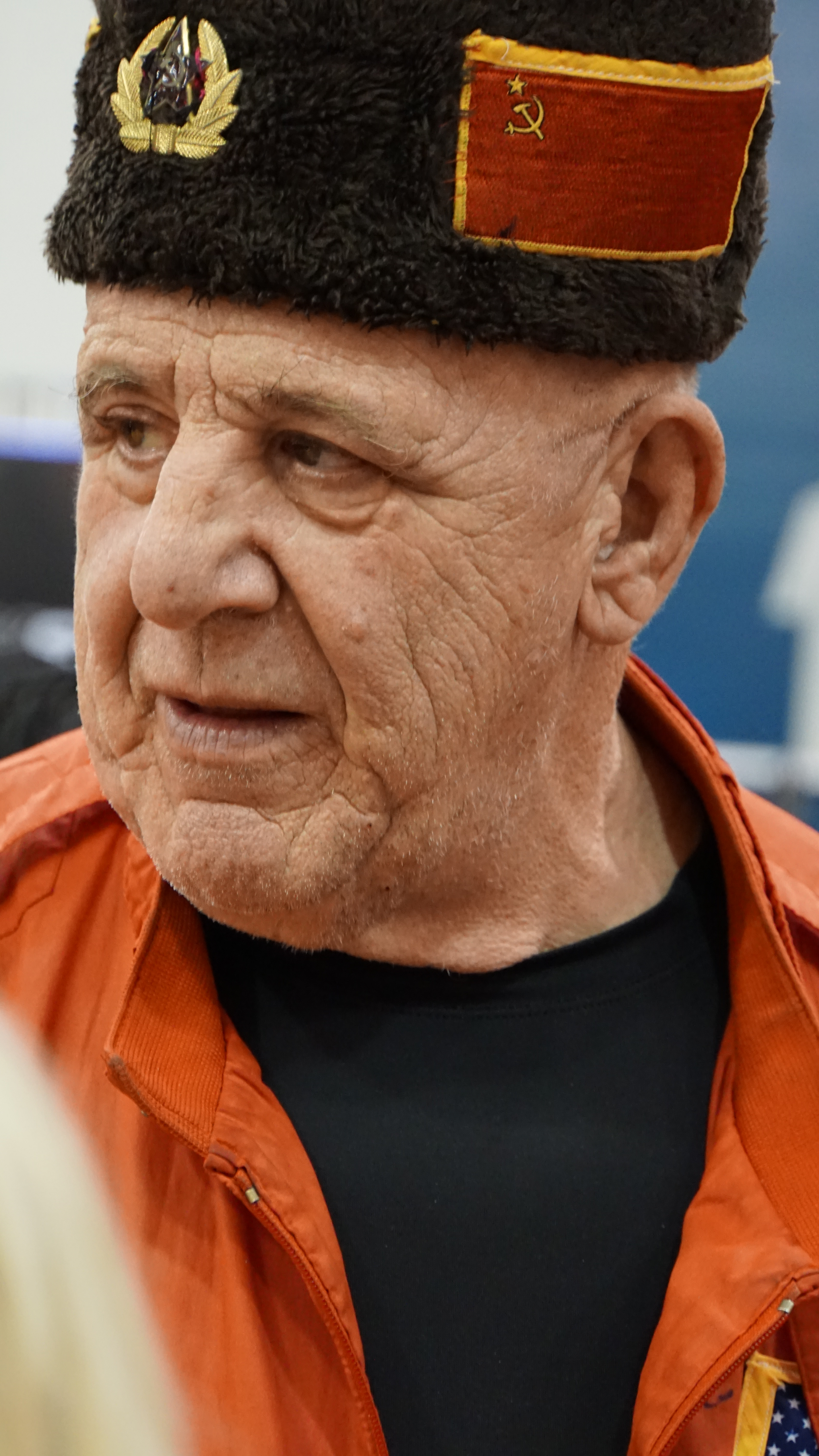
- Volkoff in 2015

Personal information
- Born: Josip Hrvoje Peruzović; October 14, 1947 Split, PR Croatia, FPR Yugoslavia
- Died: July 29, 2018 (aged 70) Glen Arm, Maryland, U.S.
- Children: 2

Professional wrestling career
- Ring name(s): Nikolai Volkoff; Bepo Mongol; Boris Breznikoff; Executioner #3
- Billed height: 6 ft 4 in (193 cm)
- Billed weight: 313 lb (142 kg)
- Billed from: Moscow, Russia; Soviet Union; Lithuania (babyface after 1990); Mongolia (as Bepo Mongol)
- Trained by: Stu Hart; Newton Tattrie
- Debut: 1967

Josip Hrvoje Peruzović (October 14, 1947 – July 29, 2018), better known by his ring name Nikolai Volkoff, was a Croatian-American professional wrestler, best known for his time in the World Wrestling Federation (WWF).

In the 1970s, Peruzović was Bepo Mongol of the Mongols tag team with Geeto Mongol, and one of the masked Executioners. He later transitioned to singles competition as Volkoff, a Russian Soviet heel, and feuded with Bruno Sammartino over the WWWF World Heavyweight Championship. In the 1980s, he tag teamed with the Iron Sheik and won the WWF Tag Team Championship at the inaugural WrestleMania event.

In 1990, after having been wrestling with Boris Zhukov in the Bolsheviks, Volkoff turned face and defected to America, briefly feuding with Zhukov and newly-heel Iraqi sympathizer Sgt. Slaughter. In 1994, after a hiatus, he returned as a destitute and desperate character, exploited by Ted DiBiase as the first member of his Million Dollar Corporation. He continued to wrestle in various promotions until his death in 2018.

== Early life ==
Peruzović grew up in the Socialist Republic of Croatia, which was then part of Yugoslavia, to ethnic Croat parents Ivan and Dragica Peruzović (nee Tomašević). His maternal grandfather Ante Tomašević, originally from Sinj, was world champion in the Greco-Roman wrestling style at the turn of the 20th century. According to Freddie Blassie's autobiography, Peruzović's family also had Russian and Italian ancestry.

Peruzović would claim in later life that "Volkoff" (Russian: Волков) was a surname from his mother's lineage. He would also claim that "Nikolai" was his middle name, which was false, his actual middle name was Hrvoje.

He was on the Yugoslavian weightlifting team until 1967, when he emigrated to Canada after a weightlifting tournament in Vienna, Austria. He received training in Calgary from Stu Hart, followed by his arrival in the United States in 1970. A fellow Croatian-native played the first Soviet Volkoff character in American pro-wrestling. Steve Gobb (originally Gobrokovich) wrestled as USSR's Nicoli [sic] Volkoff in the 1960s before the character was picked up by Peruzović.

== Professional wrestling career ==
=== Early career (1967–1970) ===
While trying his luck as a wrestler in Calgary, Alberta, in 1967, he met wrestler Newton Tattrie, who was wrestling for Stu Hart's Stampede Wrestling. During his 1967–1968 tour, Tattrie took Peruzović under his wing as a protégé and trained the non-English speaking, 315-pound man to become a professional wrestler and tag team partner. When Tattrie left the territory in 1968 for the US, Peruzović left with him, working in various territories for the National Wrestling Alliance including NWA Detroit, the International Wrestling Association and the National Wrestling Federation where they won tag gold.

=== World Wide Wrestling Federation- Bepo Mongol (1970–1971) ===
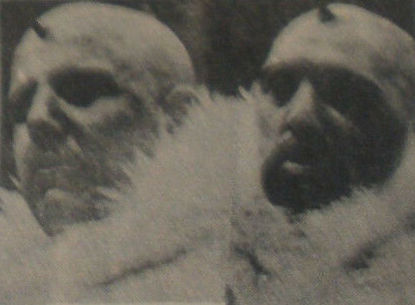
Volkoff (left) as one half of the Mongols

In 1970 he began wrestling in Vince McMahon Sr.'s World Wide Wrestling Federation (WWWF) (currently known as WWE). Wrestling as Bepo Mongol, managed by "Captain" Lou Albano and partnered with Newton Tattrie (as Geeto Mongol) as the Mongols billed from Mongolia. They captured the WWF International Tag Team Championship from Tony Marino and Victor Rivera on June 15, 1970. After losing the title to Luke Graham and Tarzan Tyler in a match over a year later that unified the WWWF International and WWWF World Tag Team Championship, Peruzović left the WWWF and went on to singles competition under the name "Nikolai Volkoff".

=== Return to the WWWF (1974–1980) ===
In 1974, Volkoff returned to the company and appeared in a memorable match at a sold out Madison Square Garden and wrestled one of the sport's most famous champions, Bruno Sammartino. During this time, he was billed from Mongolia. In 1976, he was masked as an Executioner as he became the third member along with Killer Kowalski and Big John Studd. They captured the World Tag Team Championship, but it was vacated due to a third member interfering. Later he reverted to the Volkoff name. During this time in the WWWF, Volkoff was announced as being from Mongolia. He had a very successful feud with Bruno Sammartino, which started when Volkoff attacked him during an interview segment. They sold-out arenas throughout the Northeast. During this tenure, he began crushing fresh apples with one hand as a sign of what he would do to his opponents. He later had a feud with Bob Backlund during Backlund's tenure as champion.

=== American Wrestling Association; Mid-South; and Japan (1972–1984, 1989) ===
Late in 1974, Volkoff moved to the AWA where he wrestled under the name Boris Breznikoff, managed by Bobby "The Brain" Heenan, he used the same gimmick with a different ring name. From 1977 to 1983 he wrestled in Japan for New Japan Pro-Wrestling and All Japan Pro Wrestling. In 1983, Volkoff wrestled for "Cowboy" Bill Watts in the Mid-South region. On October 29, 1989, he returned to AWA for a one night appearance as he lost to Ken Patera.

=== Second return to the WWF (1984–1990, 1992) ===
==== Teaming with the Iron Sheik (1984–1987) ====
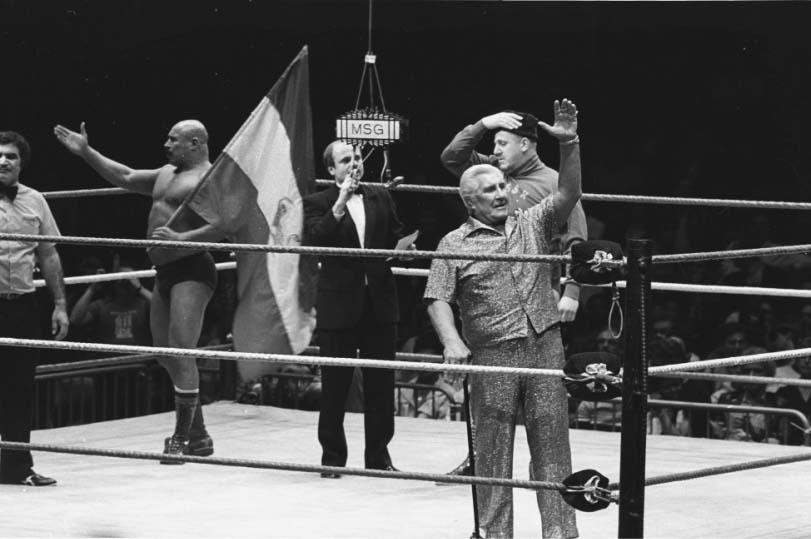
Volkoff with the Iron Sheik and their manager, Freddie Blassie

In July 1984, Volkoff returned to the renamed WWF defeating S. D. Jones on Georgia Championship Wrestling and teamed with the Iron Sheik with the pair being managed by the "Hollywood fashion plate" "Classy" Freddie Blassie. It was at this point that Volkoff began to sing the national anthem of the Soviet Union before every match after which the Sheik would grab the microphone and proclaim "Iran number one, Russia number one" before exaggeratedly spitting after saying "USA" (or "USA and Canada" when in or broadcast in Canada), in order to gain even more heat for being foreign heels. The new team of Volkoff and the Iron Sheik captured the WWF Tag Team Championship from the U.S. Express (Mike Rotundo and Barry Windham) at the first WrestleMania, on March 31, 1985, after the Sheik had knocked out Windham with Fred Blassie's cane. After losing the title back to Rotundo and Windham three months later, Volkoff began to wrestle more in singles competition. He faced Hulk Hogan for the WWF World Heavyweight Championship on several occasions in 1985 and 1986 (including a flag match on Saturday Night's Main Event II at the Brendan Byrne Arena).

Volkoff also feuded with former 82nd Airborne paratrooper Corporal Kirchner throughout 1985 and 1986, defeating him in a "peace match" on Saturday Night's Main Event IV. Their feud ended when Kirchner used Blassie's cane to defeat Volkoff at WrestleMania 2 in another flag match during the Chicago portion of the event. In the fall of 1986, Volkoff's manager "Classy" Freddy Blassie sold half interest in his stable of superstars to the "Doctor of Style", Slick (kayfabe), giving Slick co-managerial rights to Volkoff. Blassie also shared the contracts of the Iron Sheik and Hercules. This was a storyline aimed at reducing the aging Blassie's active role, and the "Hollywood fashion plate" eventually retired in the fall of 1986 at the age of 68. Sheik and Volkoff feuded with WWF newcomer Jim Duggan for the majority of 1987, including Duggan running to the ring and stopping the Russian's singing before their match against the Killer Bees at WrestleMania III (Sheik and Volkoff won by disqualification when Duggan entered the ring while chasing Volkoff and then hitting the Sheik with his 2x4 while he had the camel clutch on "Jumping" Jim Brunzell).

==== The Bolsheviks (1987–1990) ====
In late 1987, Volkoff was teamed with Boris Zhukov, another purported Russian (played by American James Harrell), to form the Bolsheviks. They feuded with WWF newcomers the Powers of Pain, losing to them at the inaugural SummerSlam PPV in 1988. As they lost the public eye due to many losses, they eventually lost their manager Slick and were used as a comic relief team losing many matches to the Bushwhackers. The Bolsheviks never held any titles together, and are perhaps best remembered for being defeated in 19 seconds by the Hart Foundation at WrestleMania VI. Eventually, by 1990, the Bolsheviks split up. Volkoff publicly ended the partnership prior to a match where he confronted Zhukhov and then started singing "The Star-Spangled Banner", drawing loud cheers from the audience and turning babyface in the process.

==== Babyface turn (1990; 1992) ====
A short time after the Bolsheviks split, Volkoff became a face for the first time in his career. His gimmick was now that of a recent defector, he became very pro-west which led to a feud with Sgt. Slaughter who had an Iraqi sympathizer role and teamed with the former Iron Sheik, who had recently begun an Iraqi gimmick under the name Colonel Mustafa. After Volkoff's team defeated Slaughter's team at the 1990 Survivor Series (Tito Santana was the sole survivor), Volkoff left the WWF at the end of 1990.

He made a brief return to compete in the 1992 Royal Rumble match where he was eliminated by Repo Man, as well as he lost to Hercules in a house show match on January 29 in Lowell, Massachusetts.

=== Various promotions (1991–1994) ===
After leaving WWF, Volkoff began competing in the independent circuit. On May 3, 1991, he defeated his former Bolshevik partner Boris Zhukov for Trans World Wrestling Federation in Newington, Connecticut. On August 8, 1992, he went to Puerto Rico to wrestled for World Wrestling Council WWC 19th Anniversario 1992 losing to the Patriot. On April 4, 1993, he wrestled his former partner the Iron Sheik to a double count out at Wrestling in the USA event in Livingston, New Jersey.

=== Eastern Championship Wrestling (1992–1993) ===
In 1992 he went to Eastern Championship Wrestling in Philadelphia where he feuded with Vladimir Markoff. On October 2, he lost to ECW Champion Don Muraco. He then returned to ECW on October 16, 1993, as he lost to Jimmy Snuka.

=== Third return to the WWF (1993; 1994–1995) ===
==== One night appearance (1993) ====
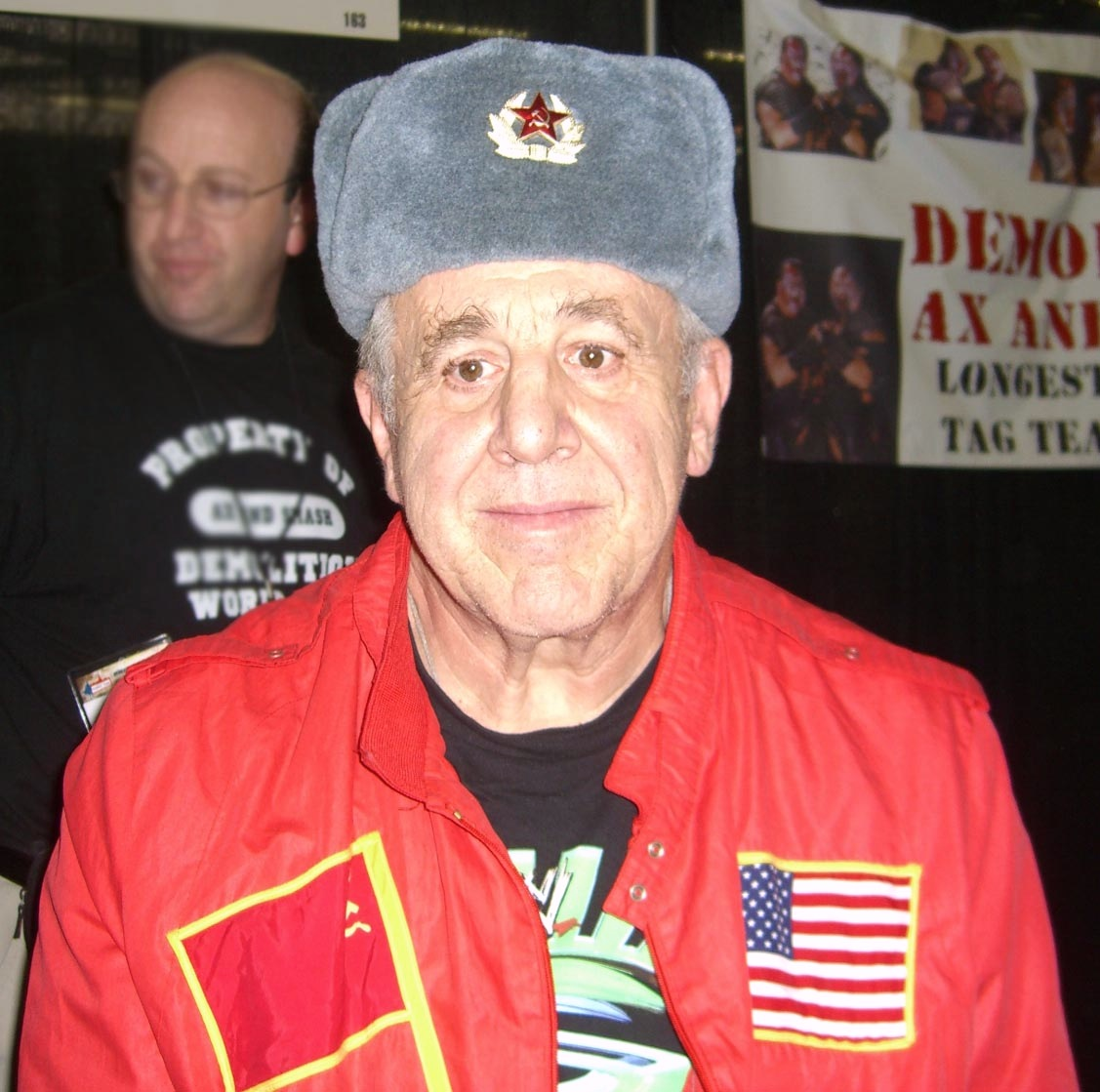
Volkoff in 2009

He returned as a babyface to pin Barry Horowitz at a WWF Superstars/All-American Wrestling taping on July 6, 1993, in Wilkes-Barre, Pennsylvania.

==== The Million Dollar Corporation; departure (1994–1995) ====
On February 1, 1994, Volkoff began a full-time return to the WWF, making a ringside appearance at a Superstars taping in White Plains, New York during a match between Diesel and Mike Moraldo. For the next two months, Volkoff was shown in the crowd, until eventually he became a sympathetic heel by playing the whipping-boy of Ted DiBiase's Million Dollar Corporation. Volkoff had kayfabe fallen on hard times and was forced to take a job working for DiBiase and his new Corporation. As low man in the group he was forced to wrestle matches no one else wanted to or sent out to "soften up" opponents for other members of the stable as the sacrificial lamb of the group. The disrespect even extended to renaming him "Nickel & Dime" Volkoff and DiBiase forcing him to place a ¢ on his trunks where the Russian sickle once was along with a sign on his ring attire that read "Property of the Million Dollar Man". The final WWF match for Volkoff was on December 30, 1994, when he defeated jobber Bob Starr in a house show. Volkoff's final appearance was at the WWF's final show at the Boston Garden on May 13, 1995. During a match between Bam Bam Bigelow and Tatanka, Volkoff made an appearance to chase Tatanka's manager Ted Dibiase away. Following this last run in the WWF, Volkoff entered semi-retirement.

=== Later career (1995–2018) ===
Volkoff made a brief cameo on an episode of Shotgun Saturday Night in 1997 where Todd Pettengill discovered him homeless sleeping in a box on the streets of New York City. He also appeared at WrestleMania X-Seven at the Astrodome in Houston in the gimmick battle royal which was won by the Iron Sheik. On November 30, 2001, he lost to King Kong Bundy at AAWA event in Jersey City, New Jersey. On February 3, 2005, Volkoff was announced as one of the WWE Hall of Fame inductees for the class of 2005. He was inducted on April 2, 2005, by Jim Ross at the Universal Amphitheatre in Los Angeles. In 2006, Volkoff took part in the World Wrestling Legends pay-per-view 6:05 The Reunion. Managed by the Iron Sheik, he wrestled a match against Duggan. Before the match, he once again sang the national anthem of the Soviet Union and riled up the crowd. Volkoff made his first appearance on WWE television in over two years on the August 13, 2007 episode of Raw as a contestant on WWE Idol, a parody of American Idol. Volkoff appeared alongside the Iron Sheik and Howard Finkel, although Volkoff was the only one who sang. Volkoff sang the Soviet Union national anthem, receiving boos from the crowd (despite being a babyface) and was insulted by judge William Regal, although judges Mick Foley and Maria both praised the performance. In response, Sheik, who was also insulted, went on a tirade until both he and Volkoff were escorted out of the building by security.

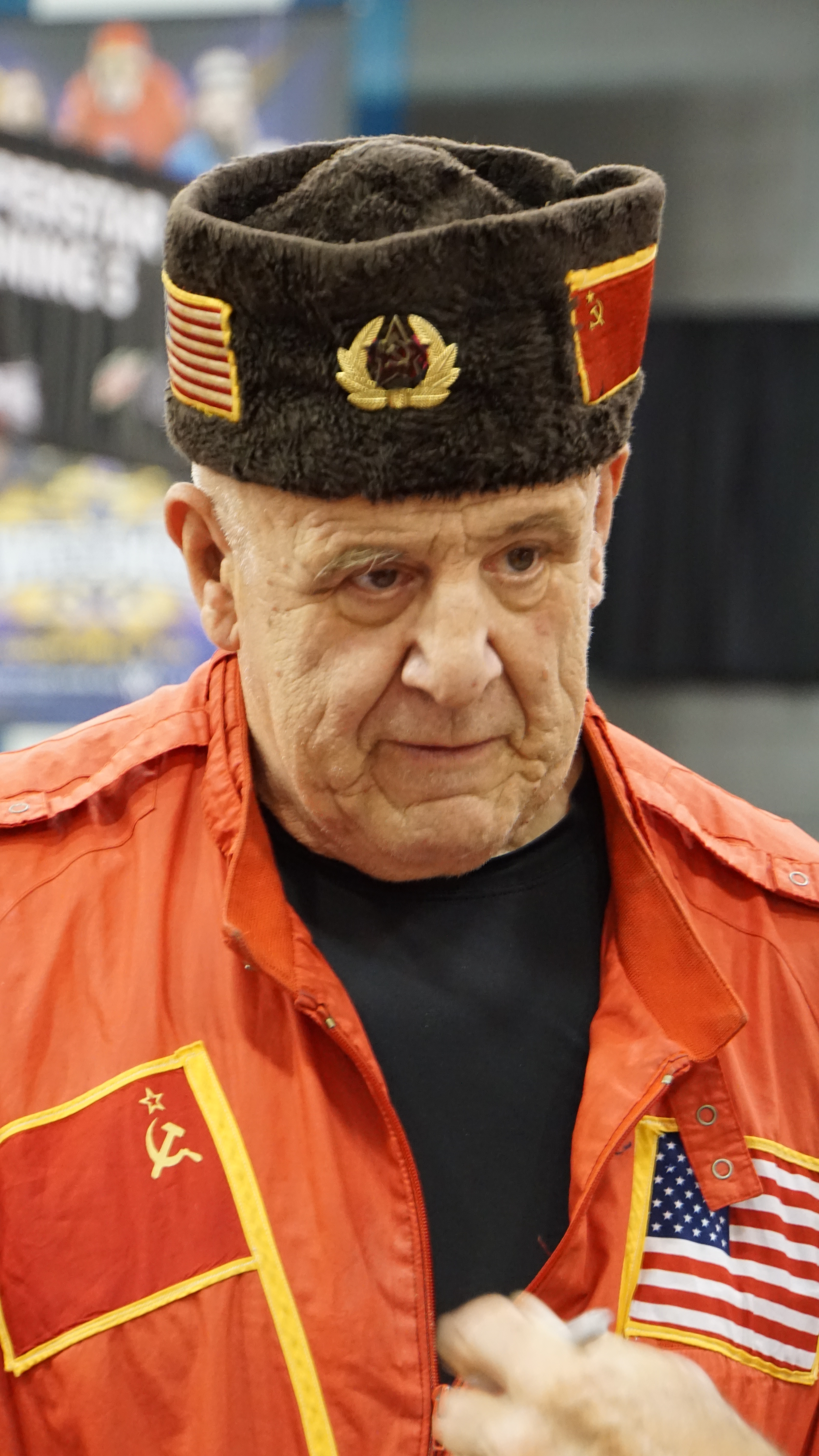
Volkoff in 2015

The March 10, 2008, edition of WWE Raw, featured rematches from previous WrestleManias. The Iron Sheik appeared along with Nikolai Volkoff to face off against the U.S. Express in a rematch from the first WrestleMania. The match never started as Jillian Hall came out to interrupt Volkoff's singing so she could sing Bruce Springsteen's "Born in the U.S.A.", which the U.S. Express used as their ring entrance music in 1984–85. On the November 15, 2010, edition of Raw, as part of the "old school" theme, Volkoff appeared with the Iron Sheik, singing the Soviet national anthem before being interrupted by Santino Marella and Vladimir Kozlov, the latter of whom then sung a duet with Volkoff of the Soviet national anthem. Afterwards, Volkoff worked for various independent promotions throughout North America. He remained popular on the autograph convention circuit. In June 2013 he threw out the first pitch at a Bowie Baysox baseball game and sang "God Bless America" after the pitch. In October 2013, he sang the Soviet national anthem at a show in New Jersey, after being introduced by Howard Finkel.

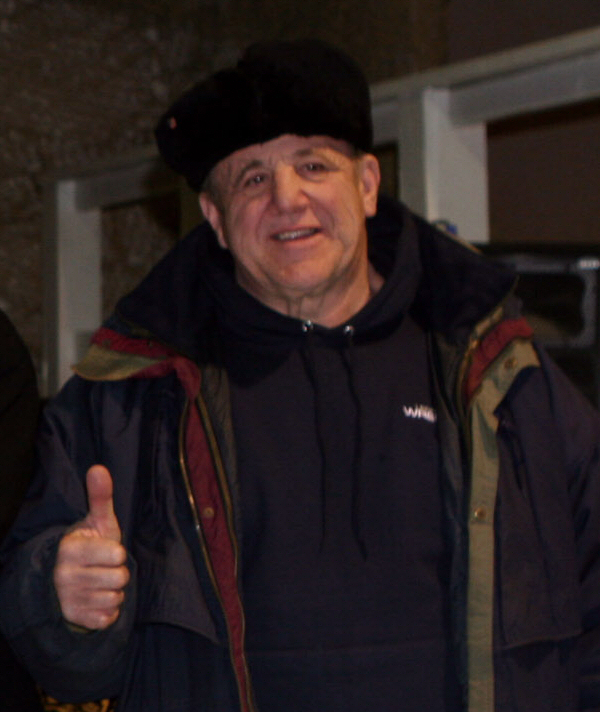
Volkoff in 2008

Volkoff lent his name to a forward for a fiction novel called Only the Beginning which is set in the 1980s and is about a girl's life during high school. While the book is not wrestling related, the author Jason Strecker was a personal friend of Volkoff's and in the foreword Volkoff responds to his friendship with the author along with the book's message of being of strong character and doing positive actions for others. The book also has a foreword by Jimmy Valiant. On the January 6, 2014, "Old School" episode of RAW, Volkoff encountered Big E. Langston on his way to a match and sung him the Soviet national anthem, to which Langston smiled. Immediately after, Langston walked past fellow Million Dollar Corporation members, Ted DiBiase and Irwin R. Schyster. On the RAW Fallout segment following the September 8, 2014 Raw, Volkoff appeared backstage with Rusev and Lana and sang the Soviet national anthem. On February 28, 2015, Volkoff appeared for the Superstars of Wrestling promotion in Bayville, New Jersey, where he teamed with ECW legend the Sandman to take on independent standouts Kentucky Bred – in a 3 on 2 handicap tag match. Before the match, Volkoff and Sandman sang the Soviet national anthem and proceeded to drink beer together. The duo squashed Kentucky Bred and then poured beer all over them.

On March 21, 2015, Volkoff participated at a SICW event taking place on East Carondelet. Volkoff managed and mentored the team of younger wrestlers Ricky Cruz and Red River Jack, while also managing veteran wrestler "Cowboy" Bob Orton Jr. to take on the team of Chris Hargas, Bull Bronson, and Attila Khan. Volkoff and Orton appeared in their outfit and gimmick from their WWF days. The team of Volkoff, Orton, Cruz, and Jack came up victorious. On March 5, 2016, Volkoff showed up at Night of Legends at Billtown Wrestling in Williamsport, Pennsylvania, sang the American national anthem and teamed with Cash Money, who turned on him to give the win to Koko B. Ware and Jim Neidhart. On June 25, 2016, he wrestled his last match in Canada where he defeated the Messiah for Great North Wrestling in Pembroke, Ontario. On June 9, 2017, Volkoff wrestled for H2O Wrestling: 1 Year Anniversary in Willamstown, New Jersey as he defeated D. J. Hyde. On May 5, 2018, at the age of 70, Volkoff wrestled his final match, teaming with Jim Duggan to defeat the team of Mecha Mercenary and Nicky Benz for Battleground Championship Wrestling in Feasterville, Pennsylvania.

== Personal life ==
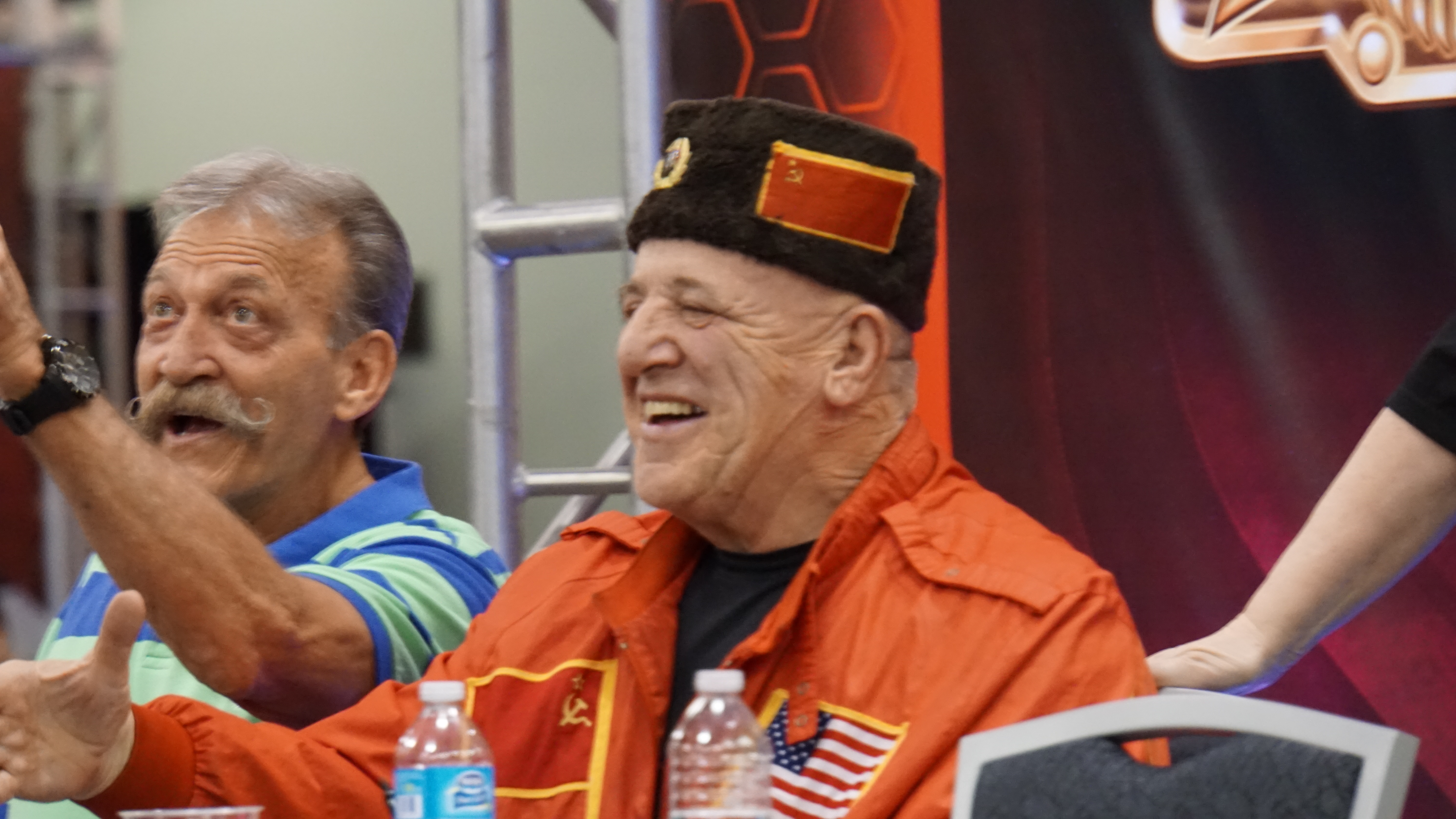
Volkoff (right) with Paul Orndorff, 2015

Peruzović met his wife Lynn in 1970, and became an American citizen that year. In Freddie Blassie's autobiography Listen, You Pencil Neck Geeks, he describes Peruzović as a "good family man" who helped Blassie reconnect with a daughter from whom he had been estranged for many years. In a 2009 shoot interview released by Pro Wrestling Diary on DVD, Peruzović discusses his in-depth history with Freddie Blassie as well as helping Blassie re-connect with his daughter. During his career he was also known for his frugality, and traveled with a hot plate to avoid having to spend money on meals at restaurants.

Peruzović worked with the Baltimore County Police Athletic League kids programs. He previously worked as a code enforcement officer in Baltimore County.

=== Politics ===
Peruzović ran unsuccessfully in the 2006 Maryland Republican primary for state delegate in District 7 (representing parts of Baltimore and Harford County).

== Death ==
Peruzović died at home on July 29, 2018, at the age of 70, days after being released from a Maryland hospital where he had been treated for dehydration and other medical issues.

== Other media ==
- Volkoff is a playable character in the following video games: Legends of Wrestling (2001), Legends of Wrestling II (2002), WWE SmackDown! Here Comes the Pain (2003) though his name is misspelled as Nicholai Volkoff , Showdown: Legends of Wrestling (2004), and WWE Legends of WrestleMania (2009).
- On October 29, 2007, a Homestar Runner Halloween special was released, in which Strong Mad was dressed as Nikolai Volkoff.
- In 2010, Volkoff appeared along with wrestler Jimmy Cicero on Karlos Borloff's internet TV show Monster Madhouse.
- In 2016, Volkoff released a biographical comic book miniseries through Squared Circle Comics, titled "Nikolai" (2016–2018).The series was later re-released under the title "Turnbuckle Titans" from Antarctic Press (2019).
- In 2018, Volkoff appeared in the horror film WrestleMassacre as the father of the film's central character, played by pro wrestler Richie the Cuban Assassin Acevedo. The film was released on DVD and on demand on June 16, 2020.

== Championships and accomplishments ==
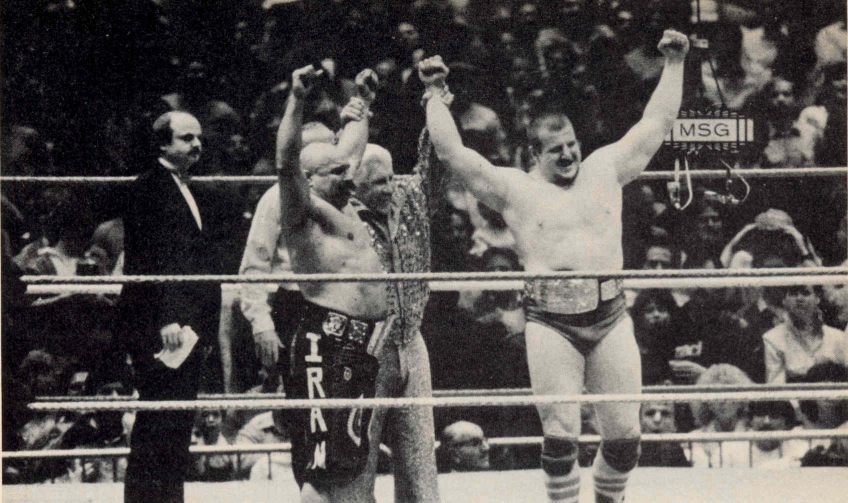
Volkoff was a one-time WWF Tag Team Champion with The Iron Sheik

- Championship Wrestling from Florida
  - NWA Florida Tag Team Championship (1 time) – with Ivan Koloff
- Georgia Championship Wrestling**
  - NWA Brass Knuckles Championship ( 1 time )
  - NWA Georgia Heavyweight Championship ( 1 time )
  - NWA Macon Tag Team Championship (1 time) - with Brute Bernard
  - NWA U.S. Tag Team Championship (1 time) - with Brute Bernard
- National Wrestling Federation
  - NWF World Tag Team Championship (1 time) – with Geeto Mongol
- Maryland Championship Wrestling
  - MCW Hall of Fame (Class of 2009)
- Mid-Atlantic Championship Wrestling
  - NWA Mid-Atlantic Tag Team Championship (1 time) – with Chris Markoff
- Mid-South Wrestling
  - Mid-South North American Championship (1 time)
- New England Pro Wrestling Hall of Fame
  - Class of 2013
- North American Wrestling
  - NAW Heavyweight Championship (2 times)
- Northeast Championship Wrestling (Tom Janette)
  - NCW Heavyweight Championship (1 time)
- NWA Detroit
  - NWA World Tag Team Championship (Detroit version) (1 time) – with Boris Volkoff
- Pro Wrestling Illustrated
  - Ranked No. 134 of the 500 singles wrestlers in the PWI 500 in 1994
  - Ranked No. 136 of the top 500 singles wrestlers during the "PWI Years" in 2003
  - Ranked No. 96 of the 100 tag teams of the "PWI Years" with the Iron Sheik in 2003
- Universal Wrestling Association
  - UWA Heavyweight Championship (1 time)
- World Wide Wrestling Alliance
  - WWWA Heavyweight Championship (1 time)
- Summit Wrestling Association
  - SWA Heavyweight Championship (2 times)
- World Wide Wrestling Federation/World Wrestling Federation/World Wrestling Entertainment
  - WWF Tag Team Championship (1 time) – with the Iron Sheik
  - WWWF International Tag Team Championship (2 times) – with Geto Mongol
  - WWE Hall of Fame (Class of 2005)
  - Slammy Award (2 times)
    - Most Ignominious (1986)
    - Best Personal Hygiene (1987) with Boris Zhukov and Slick
- World Wrestling Association (Larry Sharpe)

- WWA Heavyweight Championship (1 time)

- Wrestling Observer Newsletter
  - Worst Tag Team (1988) with Boris Zhukov
