= Tarzan Tyler =

Canadian professional wrestler and manager (1927–1985)

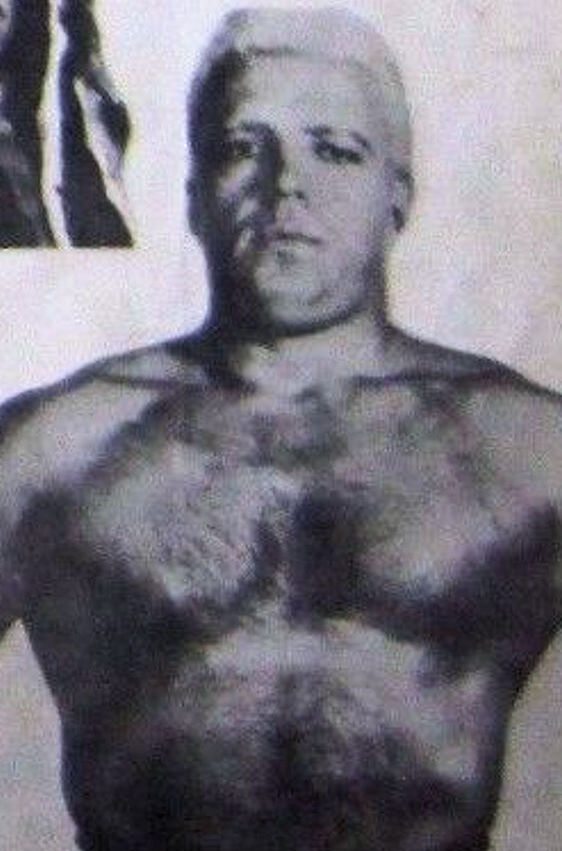
- Tyler in 1973

Personal information
- Born: Camille Laurent Tourville; December 4, 1927 Montreal, Quebec, Canada
- Died: December 24, 1985 (aged 58) Laurentides Wildlife Reserve, Quebec, Canada

Professional wrestling career
- Ring name(s): Tarzan Tyler; Tarzan Tourville; The Boot
- Billed height: 6 ft 3 in (191 cm)
- Billed weight: 270 lb (122 kg)
- Billed from: Miami Beach, Florida
- Trained by: Jacques Rougeau, Sr. Édouard Carpentier; Yvon Robert Jr.
- Debut: 1949

Camille Laurent "Tarzan" Tourville (December 4, 1927 – December 24, 1985), better known by his ring name Tarzan "The Boot" Tyler, was a Canadian professional wrestler and manager. He was one-half of the first WWWF World Tag Team Champions, along with Luke Graham.

== Professional wrestling career ==
Tourville competed as an amateur wrestler until he was spotted by local promoter Sylvio Samson, who started booking him. He began wrestling in Montreal throughout the early 1950s as Tarzan Tyler. His first bout in the Montreal Forum saw him compete against Don Leo Jonathan as a face. Tourville also competed as Tarzan Tourville, and under this name, wrestled in Maple Leaf Gardens for the first time in 1958. On May 27, 1960, Tourville teamed with the Mighty Ursus, defeating Oattem Fisher and Luther Lindsay to win the Stampede Wrestling International Tag Team Championship, and dropped it in July to Jim Wright and Gypsy Joe. Tyler moved to the United States during the 1960s after having spent nearly 10 years wrestling in Canada. He found success while wrestling in Texas, winning the NWA World Tag Team Championship with Jay York among other titles. In 1964, he would wrestle as a heel in Florida and also served as a booker.

By 1965, Tyler began to wrestle for the WWWF, challenging Bruno Sammartino for the WWWF Championship albeit unsuccessfully. He often competed for world championships against such stars as Verne Gagne, Lou Thesz, and Dory Funk Jr. On June 3, 1971, Tyler and Crazy Luke Graham defeated Dick the Bruiser and The Sheik to become the inaugural WWWF World Tag Team Champions. Later that year, he would also face Pedro Morales at a show in Madison Square Garden during the main event for the WWWF Championship. On November 12, he and Graham defeated WWWF International Tag Team Champions The Mongols (Geto Mongol and Bepo Mongol) for their titles. They lost the World Tag Team Championship on December 6 to Karl Gotch and Rene Goulet.

In 1973, Tyler was injured during a match with André the Giant, and as a result, he was paralyzed for months. Once he returned from injury, Tyler would start using a loaded boot, where he tapped his boot on the mat three times (to slip a foreign object) before kicking his opponent; this earned him his nickname of "The Boot". By the 1970s, he returned to Montreal and worked for Grand Prix Wrestling initially before it shut down, then appeared as a top heel for George Cannon's Superstars of Wrestling. Tyler was a manager for Gino Brito's Lutte Internationale before his death.

== Personal life and death ==
Tourville grew up in Montreal and his friends nicknamed him "Tarzan" by the age of ten.

On December 24, 1985, Tourville died in a car crash along with fellow wrestler Pierre 'Mad Dog' Lefébvre and referee Adrien Desbois in Laurentides Wildlife Reserve upon returning from a wrestling event in Chicoutimi, Québec. Their car had slid on a curve, killing them after they hit a tow truck. He was 58 years old.

== Championships and accomplishments ==
- American Wrestling Association
  - AWA Midwest Heavyweight Championship (2 times)
- Big Time Wrestling
  - NWA World Tag Team Championship (1 time) – with The Alaskan
- Central States Wrestling
  - NWA Central States Heavyweight Championship (1 time)
- Championship Wrestling from Florida
  - NWA Brass Knuckles Championship (Florida version) (2 times)
  - NWA Florida Heavyweight Championship (1 time)
  - NWA Florida Television Championship (2 times)
  - NWA Southern Heavyweight Championship (Florida version) (2 times)
  - NWA Southern Tag Team Championship (Florida version) (1 time) – with Louie Tillet
  - NWA World Tag Team Championship (Florida version) (2 times) – with Tim Tyler (1) and Freddie Blassie (1)
- International Wrestling Association
  - IWA North American Heavyweight Championship (1 time)
- Japan Wrestling Association
  - NWA International Tag Team Championship (1 time) – with Bill Watts
- Mid-South Sports
  - NWA Georgia Heavyweight Championship (1 time)
  - NWA World Tag Team Championship (Georgia version) (1 time) – with Lenny Montana
  - NWA International Tag Team Championship (Georgia version) (1 time) – with Lenny Montana
- Stampede Wrestling
  - Stampede Wrestling International Tag Team Championship (1 time) – with Mighty Ursus
- World Wide Wrestling Federation
  - WWWF International Tag Team Championship (1 time) – with Luke Graham
  - WWWF World Tag Team Championship (1 time, inaugural) – with Luke Graham
