= World Tag Team Championship (WWE, 1971–2010) =

Former men's professional wrestling championship

- Replica version of the World Tag Team Championship belt's longest-used design (1985–2002)

Details
- Promotion: World Wrestling Entertainment
- Date established: June 3, 1971
- Date retired: August 16, 2010 (Note: From April 2009 to August 2010, the title had been held and defended together with the WWE Tag Team Championship as the Unified WWE Tag Team Championship. Both titles had remained independently active until the original World Tag Team Championship was retired in favor of the WWE Tag Team Championship, which dropped the "unified" moniker.) (unified with the WWE Tag Team Championship)

Other names
- WWWF World Tag Team Championship (1971–1979); WWF World Tag Team Championship (1979–2002); WWE Tag Team Championship (2002); World Tag Team Championship (2002–2010); Unified WWE Tag Team Championship (2009–2010) (Note: In tandem with the then-WWE Tag Team Championship.)
Statistics
- First champions: Luke Graham and Tarzan Tyler
- Final champions: The Hart Dynasty (David Hart Smith and Tyson Kidd)
- Most reigns: As tag team (8 reigns): Dudley Boyz (Bubba Ray Dudley and D-Von Dudley); As individual (12 reigns): Edge
- Longest reign: Demolition (Smash and Ax) (1st reign, 478 days)
- Shortest reign: Edge & Christian (6th reign, <1 hour)
- Oldest champion: Ric Flair (57 years, 253 days)
- Youngest champion: René Duprée (19 years, 182 days)
- Heaviest champion: Spirit Squad (Johnny, Kenny, Mikey, Mitch, and Nicky) (1,445 lb (655 kg) combined)
- Lightest champion: Paul London and Brian Kendrick (380 lb (170 kg) combined)

The 1971 to 2010 version of the World Tag Team Championship was the original professional wrestling world tag team championship in the World Wrestling Entertainment (WWE) promotion, and the company's third tag team championship overall. Originally established by the then-World Wide Wrestling Federation (WWWF) on June 3, 1971 (renamed World Wrestling Federation, or WWF, in 1979), it served as the only title for tag teams in the promotion until the then-WWF bought World Championship Wrestling (WCW) in March 2001, which added the WCW Tag Team Championship. Both titles were unified in November 2001, retiring WCW's championship and continuing WWF's.

In 2002, the company was renamed WWE. Following the introduction of the WWE brand extension, where wrestlers and championships became exclusive to a WWE brand, the World Tag Team Championship became exclusive to the Raw brand, while a second WWE Tag Team Championship (currently known as the World Tag Team Championship as of April 2024) was established for the SmackDown! brand. Both titles were unified in 2009 into the Unified WWE Tag Team Championship, but remained independently active until the original World Tag Team Championship was decommissioned in 2010 in favor of continuing the newer championship.

The championship was contested in professional wrestling matches. Bouts for the title headlined WWF events including In Your House 3, Fully Loaded: In Your House, and 2001's Backlash. The inaugural champions were the team of Luke Graham and Tarzan Tyler, and the final champions were The Hart Dynasty (David Hart Smith and Tyson Kidd).

== History ==
=== Origins ===
Mr. Fuji (left) and Professor Tanaka (right) with manager Ernie Roth (center) during their tenure as WWWF World Tag Team Champions in the 1970s.

When the World Wide Wrestling Federation (WWWF) formed in 1963, their first tag team championship was the WWWF United States Tag Team Championship, which was originally an NWA championship established in 1958 and used by the WWWF's predecessor, Capitol Wrestling Corporation. After then-WWWF World Heavyweight Champion Bruno Sammartino and his tag team partner Spiros Arion won the titles in 1967, the WWWF United States Tag Team Championship was abandoned and deactivated due to Sammartino being the world champion. Two years later, The Rising Suns (Toru Tanaka and Mitsu Arakawa) arrived in the WWWF with the WWWF International Tag Team Championship, which they claimed to have won in a tournament in Tokyo in June of that year. This became the WWWF's tag team title until 1971 when it became exclusively defended in the Pittsburgh market (owned by then-champion Geeto Mongol).

The WWWF then established their own original world tag team championship, the WWWF World Tag Team Championship in 1971. Following the title's introduction, Luke Graham and Tarzan Tyler became the inaugural champions on June 3. In 1979, the title became known as the "WWF Tag Team Championship" when the promotion was renamed World Wrestling Federation (WWF). It was subsequently renamed WWF World Tag Team Championship in 1983, but was often referred to as the WWF Tag Team Championship for short.

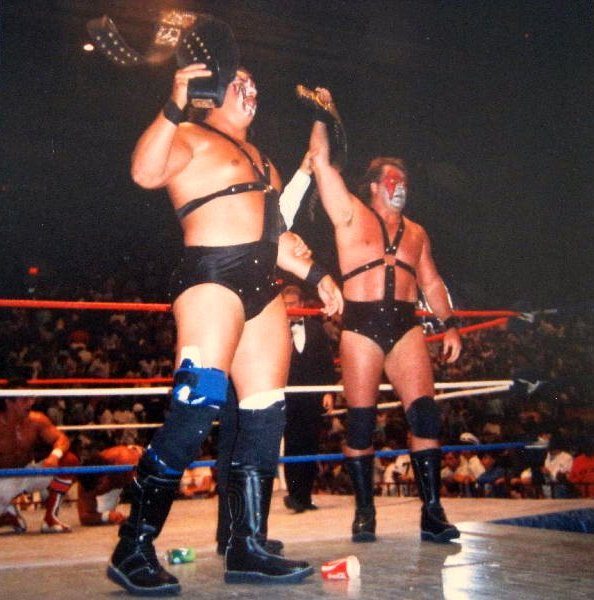
Three-time champions Demolition (Smash and Ax); their first reign is the longest reign in the title's history at 478 days

In March 2001, the WWF purchased the selected assets of rival promotion World Championship Wrestling (WCW) from AOL Time Warner and its championships were now also defended on WWF programming. Soon after, The Invasion took place in which the WCW/ECW Alliance was ultimately dismantled. The title was temporarily unified for the first time at SummerSlam when WCW Tag Team Champions Kane and The Undertaker defeated WWF Tag Team Champions Chris Kanyon and Diamond Dallas Page in a title-for-title steel cage match. Both titles remained independently active during this reign. At Survivor Series, the title was unified again with the WCW Tag Team Championship in another title-for-title steel cage match when WCW Tag Team Champions The Dudley Boyz defeated WWF Tag Team Champions The Hardy Boyz. This time, the WCW Tag Team Championship was deactivated with The Dudley Boyz recognized as the final champions and they reigned as the new WWF Tag Team Champions.

=== Brand split and unification ===
After the WWF/WWE name change in 2002, the championship was subsequently renamed "WWE Tag Team Championship". During the initial WWE brand extension, the WWE Tag Team Championship was assigned to the SmackDown! brand as the reigning champions at the time of the initial expansion, Billy and Chuck, were both drafted to SmackDown! together. In July of that year, shortly after defeating Hollywood Hulk Hogan and Edge for the titles, the reigning champion team of Lance Storm and Christian (The Un-Americans) left SmackDown! for Raw, leaving SmackDown! without a tag team title. As a result, then-SmackDown! General Manager Stephanie McMahon commissioned a new tag team title, also called the WWE Tag Team Championship, to be the exclusive tag team titles for the SmackDown! brand. With the introduction of the World Heavyweight Championship on the Raw brand after the WWE Championship became exclusive to SmackDown!, the WWE Tag Team Championship on Raw was renamed "World Tag Team Championship". This was done so that the names of both tag team titles would mirror the names of the top championships on their respective brands. When the WWE Championship and World Heavyweight Championship switched brands during the 2005 WWE draft lottery, however, neither of the tag team titles were renamed.

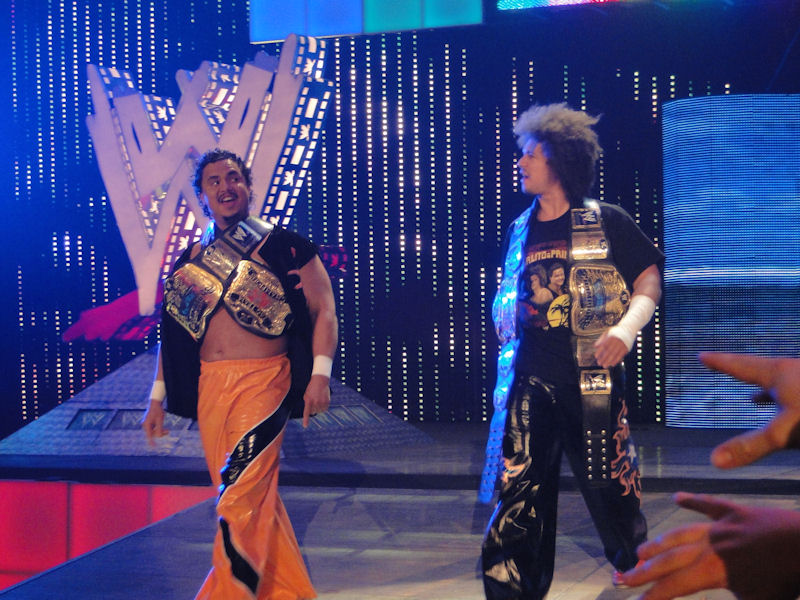
The Colóns (Primo and Carlito) unified the World Tag Team Championship and the WWE Tag Team Championship as the Unified WWE Tag Team Championship

In late 2008 through early 2009, WWE Tag Team Champions The Colóns (Carlito and Primo) engaged in rivalry with World Tag Team Champions John Morrison and the Miz, with the two teams exchanging victories in non-title matches and retaining their respective titles against each other. On the March 17 episode of ECW on Syfy, it was announced that at WrestleMania 25, both teams would defend their titles against each other and the winning team would hold both titles. The Colóns defeated Morrison and Miz, and thus unified the titles into the Unified WWE Tag Team Championship, although both championships remained independently active.

As the Unified WWE Tag Team Championship, the champions could appear and defend the titles on any WWE brand, regardless of the brand that the holders belonged to. On August 16, 2010, the World Tag Team Championship was decommissioned in favor of continuing the lineage of the WWE Tag Team Championship (which dropped the "unified" moniker) with Bret Hart presenting new championship belts to the final World Tag Team Champions, The Hart Dynasty (David Hart Smith and Tyson Kidd). In April 2024, the WWE Tag Team Championship, which had been renamed to Raw Tag Team Championship in 2016, took on the World Tag Team Championship name.

== Brand designation history ==
Following the events of the WWE brand extension, an annual WWE draft was established, in which select members of the WWE roster were reassigned to a different brand. After the World Tag Team Championship was unified with the WWE Tag Team Championship as the Unified WWE Tag Team Championship, the champions could appear and defend the titles on any WWE brand.

Date of transition	Brand	Notes
June 3, 1971	N/A	When the title was first established it didn't belong to a brand.
March 25, 2002	SmackDown	WWF Tag Team Champions Billy and Chuck were drafted to SmackDown in the 2002 WWF Draft.; In May 2002, the WWF was renamed WWE and the championship was subsequently renamed WWE Tag Team Championship.
July 29, 2002	Raw	The Un-Americans (Christian and Lance Storm) won the championship and transferred to Raw, bringing the title with them.; The championship was subsequently renamed the World Tag Team Championship.
December 12, 2008	ECW	The World Tag Team Championship was moved to ECW after ECW's John Morrison and the Miz won the championship. However, due to a talent exchange agreement between Raw and ECW, teams from either brand could challenge for the title.
April 5, 2009	—N/a	At WrestleMania 25, The Colóns unified the World Tag Team Championship and WWE Tag Team Championship as the Unified WWE Tag Team Championship. Both titles remained active and were defended on any brand until August 16, 2010 when the World Tag Team Championship was decommissioned in favor of continuing the lineage of the WWE Tag Team Championship, which dropped the "unified" moniker.

== Belt designs ==
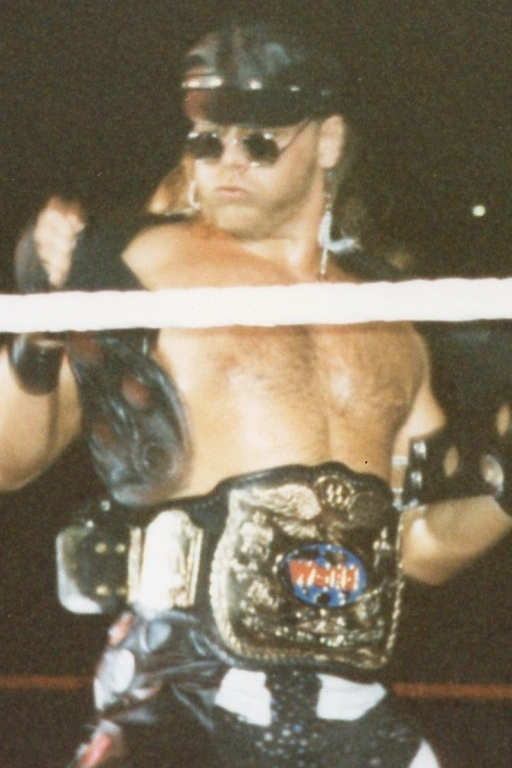
Shawn Michaels with the variant of the third WWF Tag Team Championship design used from 1985–2002.

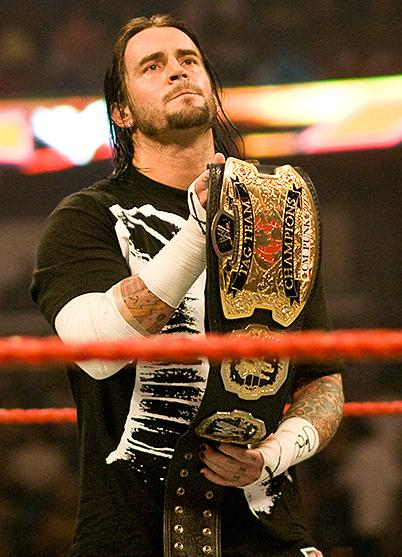
CM Punk with the fourth and final design of the World Tag Team Championship used from 2002–2010.

The original WWWF World Tag Team Championship design is similar to the WWWF United States Tag Team Championship but with one side plate on each side and a more squared center piece plus different wording minus the words United States and having the words WWWF World replace and slightly taller and thicker leather and different in the middle gold and medal designings.

The second WWWF World Tag Team Championship design is similar to the WWF Women's Tag Team Championships, but to represent difference the leather of the title is dark blue other than red and it has the word world at the top instead of the word lady.

The third WWF World Tag Team championship design in year 2002 was gold and had a gold center plate with two gold side plates on each side. The center plate is square shaped with a light blue world in the middle of it with gold outlining in it with the word world that's red in the middle of it that also has gold outlining with the words tag team wrestling champions at the bottom of it in very fancy designing with the letter "W" representing WWE at the top with a red slanted lining at the bottom of it. The side plates of the title are upward tall rectangular shaped with two men wrestling outlined in gold in the center also with the letter w representing WWE at the top with a red slanted lining at the bottom of it and the leather was black. At one time the belt was silver with gold outlining as well with the same design.

The 2002 to 2010 design of the World Tag Team Championships were very similar to the 2002 design, but instead of the world background in the middle of the title being blue is red and the words tag team at the top and the word champions at the bottom to represent a more hardcore heavyweight historical difference.

== Reigns ==
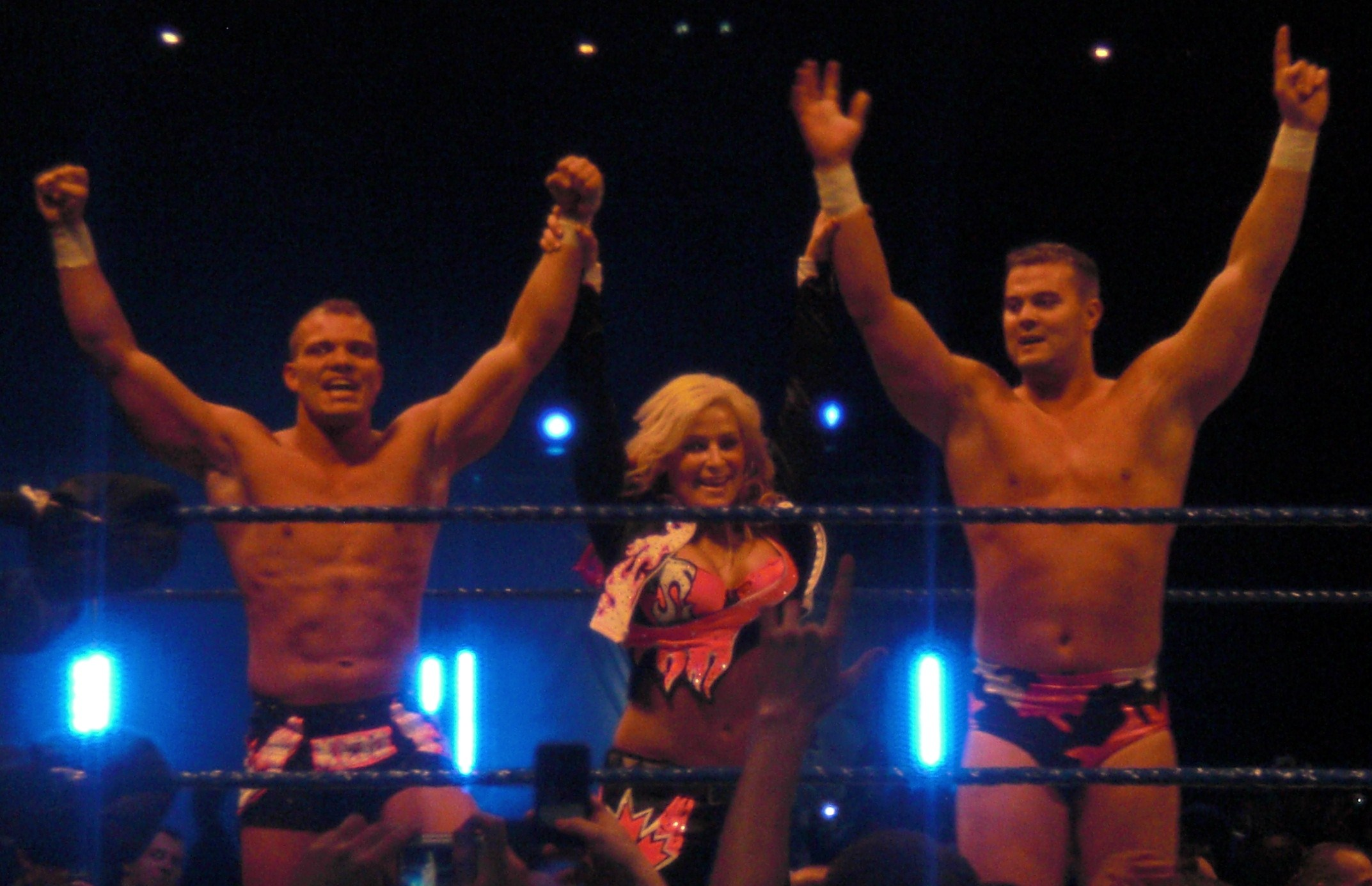
The final champions The Hart Dynasty (Tyson Kidd (left) and David Hart Smith (right)) with Natalya (center).

The inaugural champions were Crazy Luke Graham and Tarzan Tyler, who were reported as having defeated Dick the Bruiser and The Sheik in New Orleans on June 3, 1971. The record for longest reign was held by Demolition, whose first reign lasted 478 days. Three teams tied for a record with shortest reigns. Jules Strongbow and Chief Jay Strongbow had their titles taken away shortly after winning them on June 28, 1982 when it was determined that Mr. Fuji, one half of the reigning champions with Mr. Saito, was pinned with a foot on the ropes. Owen Hart and Yokozuna lost their titles on September 25, 1995, to the Smoking Gunns shortly after having the titles returned to them. On March 19, 2001, Edge and Christian defeated The Hardy Boyz to win the titles only to lose them later that night to The Dudley Boyz.

The Dudley Boyz held the record for most reigns as a team with eight. Edge held the record for overall reigns as an individual with 12, seven with Christian. He also won the titles with Hulk Hogan, Chris Benoit, Randy Orton, and Chris Jericho (after the titles were unified).

The final champions were The Hart Dynasty (David Hart Smith and Tyson Kidd), who won the titles from ShoMiz (Big Show and The Miz) on the April 26, 2010 episode of Raw. After the World Tag Team Championship was deactivated, the duo continued to serve as the WWE Tag Team Champions until their loss at Night of Champions on September 19, 2010, to Drew McIntyre and Cody Rhodes.

== Notes ==
Sporting positions
Preceded by First	WWE's top tag team championship 1971–2010	Succeeded by World Tag Team Championship and WWE Tag Team Championship
