= World Wrestling Legends =

US-based professional wrestling event

- Promotion: Sal Corrente
- Date: March 5, 2006 aired April 29, 2006
- City: Orlando, Florida
- Venue: Hard Rock Cafe at Universal Studios Florida
- Attendance: 500

World Wrestling Legends was a professional wrestling event produced by Mirabilis Ventures and promoted by Sal Corrente, which was held on March 5, 2006 at Hard Rock Cafe at Universal Studios Florida in Orlando, Florida. It was titled 6:05 - The Reunion as a tribute to the program WCW Saturday Night, which aired weekly for many years at 6:05 P.M. on TBS. The event featured many notable wrestlers who appeared on it (as well as guests who inspired it and backstage staff who worked on it) and also included a reunion of the Nitro Girls. "6:05 - The Reunion" was taped for pay-per-view and broadcast on April 29, 2006.

== 6:05 - The Reunion ==
=== Staff ===
- Director - Craig Leathers
- Producers/Bookers - Jimmy Hart and Colin Bowman
- Agents - Jimmy Hart, Colin Bowman, Dave Hebner, and Tom Prichard
- Gorilla Position - Tom Prichard and Dave Sierra
- Security - Doug Dillinger
- Ring Announcer - David Penzer
- Referees - Dave Hebner, Earl Hebner, and Brian Hebner
- Commentators - Jim Cornette, Ron Niemi, Corey Maclin (who also conducted backstage interviews) and Lance Russell

=== Results ===
| # | Results | Stipulations | Times |
|---|---|---|---|
| 1 | Jim Duggan defeated Nikolai Volkoff (with The Iron Sheik) | Singles match | n/a |
| 2 | Rick Steiner defeated Virgil | Singles match | n/a |
| 3 | Koko B. Ware defeated Disco Inferno | Singles match | n/a |
| 4 | Jimmy Snuka defeated Greg Valentine (with Jimmy Hart) by disqualification. | Singles match | n/a |
| 5 | Vampiro defeated Eddie Colón (with Carlos Colon) | Singles match | n/a |
| 6 | Jake Roberts defeated Kamala by disqualification. | Singles match | n/a |
| 7 | Dory Funk, Jr. and Mike Graham (with Bruno Sammartino) defeated Tully Blanchard and David Flair (with J. J. Dillon) | Tag Team match | n/a |
| 8 | Diamond Dallas Page defeated Kanyon | Singles match | n/a |
| 9 | Brad Armstrong, Scott Armstrong, and Bob Armstrong (with Bobby Heenan) defeated The Midnight Express (Dennis Condrey, Bobby Eaton, and Stan Lane) (with Jim Cornette) | Six-Man Tag Team match | n/a |
| 10 | Scott Steiner defeated Buff Bagwell | Singles match | n/a |
| Dark | Johnny B. Badd and Russ Rollins defeated The Blue Meanie and Norman Smiley | Singles match | n/a |

== See also ==
- WrestleReunion
