= Geeto Mongol =

Canadian professional wrestler (1931–2013)

Personal information
- Born: Newton Tattrie; July 12, 1931 Springhill, Nova Scotia, Canada
- Died: July 19, 2013 (aged 82) Virginia Beach, Virginia, U.S.

Professional wrestling career
- Ring name(s): Black Jack Daniels; Geeto Mongol/Geto Mongol; The Mongol; Mongol #1; Mr. Robust; Skunkman; Tony Newbury
- Billed height: 5 ft 11 in (1.80 m)
- Billed weight: 250 lb (110 kg)
- Billed from: Mongolia
- Trained by: Dave McKigney
- Debut: 1963
- Retired: 1983

Newton Tattrie (July 12, 1931 – July 19, 2013) was a Canadian professional wrestler better known by his ring name, Geeto Mongol (also spelled Geto Mongol).

Tattrie started his career in the 1960s working for Stu Hart's Stampede Wrestling promotion out of Calgary, Alberta, Canada. During his career, Tattrie wrestled all over the globe, wrestling for promotions across the United States, Canada, Africa, Japan, Singapore, and Puerto Rico. He also competed in the World Wide Wrestling Federation. He teamed with Josip Peruzovic as The Mongols, and the pair held the WWWF International Tag Team Championship twice. Tattrie later held the title once more while teaming with Johnny DeFazio.

== Professional wrestling career ==
=== Early years ===
Born in Springhill, Nova Scotia in 1931, Tattrie ran away from home when he was only 12. He headed to Toronto and lived on the streets during World War II. He was very interested in boxing; in fact, Tattrie once accidentally stumbled into a wrestling gym that he thought was a boxing dojo. It was there that he met wrestler Dave "The Wildman" McKigney who offered to cross-train with him. Another wrestler that he met at the gym, Waldo Von Erich, got Tattrie in the door with the World Wide Wrestling Federation (WWWF), where he wrestled for a time as Tony Newbury. In 1963, he took his craft to Calgary, Alberta, Canada, where he continued to train and work for Stu Hart's Stampede Wrestling.

=== The Mongols ===
While working in Stampede Wrestling, for Stu Hart Tattrie met Josip Peruzovic (better known in pro wrestling as Nikolai Volkoff). Tattrie took Peruzovic under his wing as a protégé and alongside Stu Hart trained the non-English speaking, 315 pound man to become a professional wrestler. Tattrie became known as Geto Mongol and Peruzovic as Bepo Mongol; together they were the Mongols. They had a very unorthodox appearance with bald heads and little "horns" of hair on the very top of their skulls.

After meeting his would-be tag team partner, Bepo Mongol, Tattrie returned to the WWWF as Geto Mongol and The Mongols were brought to the United States in 1968. By 1970, Tattrie was a very busy man. From 1971 to 1972 he ran the Pittsburgh territory which worked closely with McMahon's WWWF. He built a home in Pittsburgh and continued to wrestle, using Ace Freeman as a figurehead promoter, so as not to confuse the fans. In 1972, Bepo went off on his own to become Nikolai Volkoff and Geto (Tattrie) sold his promotion to Pedro Martinez. It was also at this time that Newton Tattrie learned to read, after spending years "bluffing it".

While competing in the WWWF, The Mongols won the WWWF International Tag Team Championship from Tony Marino and Victor Rivera on June 15, 1970. They held the belts for just over a year before losing them to Bruno Sammartino and Dominic DeNucci on June 18, 1971. The Mongols regained the title in a rematch the following month and held it until losing them on November 12 to Luke Graham and Tarzan Tyler. Geto held the championship once more, teaming with Johnny DeFazio to win the belts on December 18, 1972. They held the belts until the promotion changed ownership and the title was vacated.

=== Later career ===
Tattrie went on to train young wrestling hopefuls including Bill Eadie (better known as The Masked Superstar and Demolition Ax). Eadie joined up with Tattrie to give a rebirth to the Mongols on the Japanese wrestling circuit. Eadie was given the name Bolo Mongol. In 1975, the duo worked for the outlaw IWA promotion where they held its World Tag Team Title. In 1977, finding it hard to get out of bed, Tattrie retired from active competition, but was seen on TV in 1983 in World Class Championship Wrestling.

He died in 2013 in Virginia Beach, where he had resided in his later life.

== Championships and accomplishments ==
- Keystone State Wrestling Alliance
  - KSWA Hall of Fame (Class of 2023)
- NWA Detroit
  - NWA World Tag Team Championship (Detroit version) (1 time) – with Bolo Mongol
- National Wrestling Federation
  - NWF World Tag Team Championship (2 times) – with Bepo Mongol (1) and JB Psycho (1)
- International Wrestling Association
  - IWA World Tag Team Championship (2 times) – with Bolo Mongol
- World Wide Wrestling Federation
  - WWWF International Tag Team Championship (3 times) – with Bepo Mongol (2) and Johnny DeFazio (1)
