= Craig Leathers =

Craig Leathers is a wrestling director and producer best known working for World Championship Wrestling's telecasts. He worked with Eric Bischoff for many years during the mid to late 1990s. In 1995, Leathers was hired as television director for Ted Turner's WCW Monday Nitro, and later became executive producer of the show.

== Biography ==
Nitro brought an intense rivalry between WCW's Monday night program and the World Wrestling Federation's Monday Night Raw program. This rivalry is known as the "Monday Night War." Directed by Leathers and produced by Eric Bischoff, WCW Nitro started surpassing Raw in the television ratings, and held the highest ratings in cable for 83 consecutive weeks. Bischoff, along with Leathers, Annette Yother, Kevin Sullivan, and Terry Taylor wrote the majority of the storylines and content for Nitro and WCW pay-per-views.

Bischoff and Leathers came up with the idea that many commercial breaks should be taken during live matches. While some fans at the time found it distressing, this gave the matches an unpredictable feeling to the show. Many times Nitro would go overtime when ratings were high, sometimes even up to 15 minutes past their scheduled timeslot on TNT.

A few interesting shots from the 1995-1998 Nitro telecast include: a stationary camera (with surrounding crowd) high in the rafters giving a wide panning view of the arena - a JIB camera framed on props and pieces of equipment on the set that would boom or whip pan onto the entranceway - and various Steadicam shots following wrestlers to the ring. With the JIB and Steadicam both having wide-angle lenses and in close proximity on the set, there was a high risk of one camera capturing another. Depending on the position of the JIB, Leathers would sometimes have the Steadicam frame a shot on the ground. When cross dissolved to the Steadicam, the operator would tilt up and quickly move towards the subject. This would prove to be a stylish wipe sequence between both cameras, and in effect gave the JIB more time to swing out of view.

When Bischoff was removed from power in September 1999, Leathers would continue to direct the show for the remainder of the year, but with creative restrictions put upon him. With new management in charge, they wanted to change WCW's format to resemble WWF (now, WWE)'s style of broadcast. Changes in production included tinkering of camera angles, such as the removal of the Steadicam from the entranceway to be replaced by a standard hand held camera zoomed in from ringside. Although that change in angle may not have been as visually pleasing to some, the new management did so to better emulate the look and feel of WWF (now, WWE)'s Monday Night program.

On the February 19, 2001 Nitro broadcast, Leathers resumed position of television director around the time Bischoff regained some control of the company. With WCW up for sale, Bischoff and his investors' deal to purchase the company failed when Turner executives canceled WCW's timeslots. Eventually, WWF(now, WWE) would go on to purchase several assets of WCW in late March 2001, forcing many employees, including Leathers, to be laid off.

During a shoot interview on Steve Austin's podcast, Kevin Nash credits Leathers with developing the NWO logo.

=== World Wrestling Legends ===
In 2006, Leathers produced World Wrestling Legends, a tribute to the WCW Saturday Night program that included well-known wrestlers and a few original crew members from the show.
