= Pizzoferrato =

- Comune
- Comune di Pizzoferrato
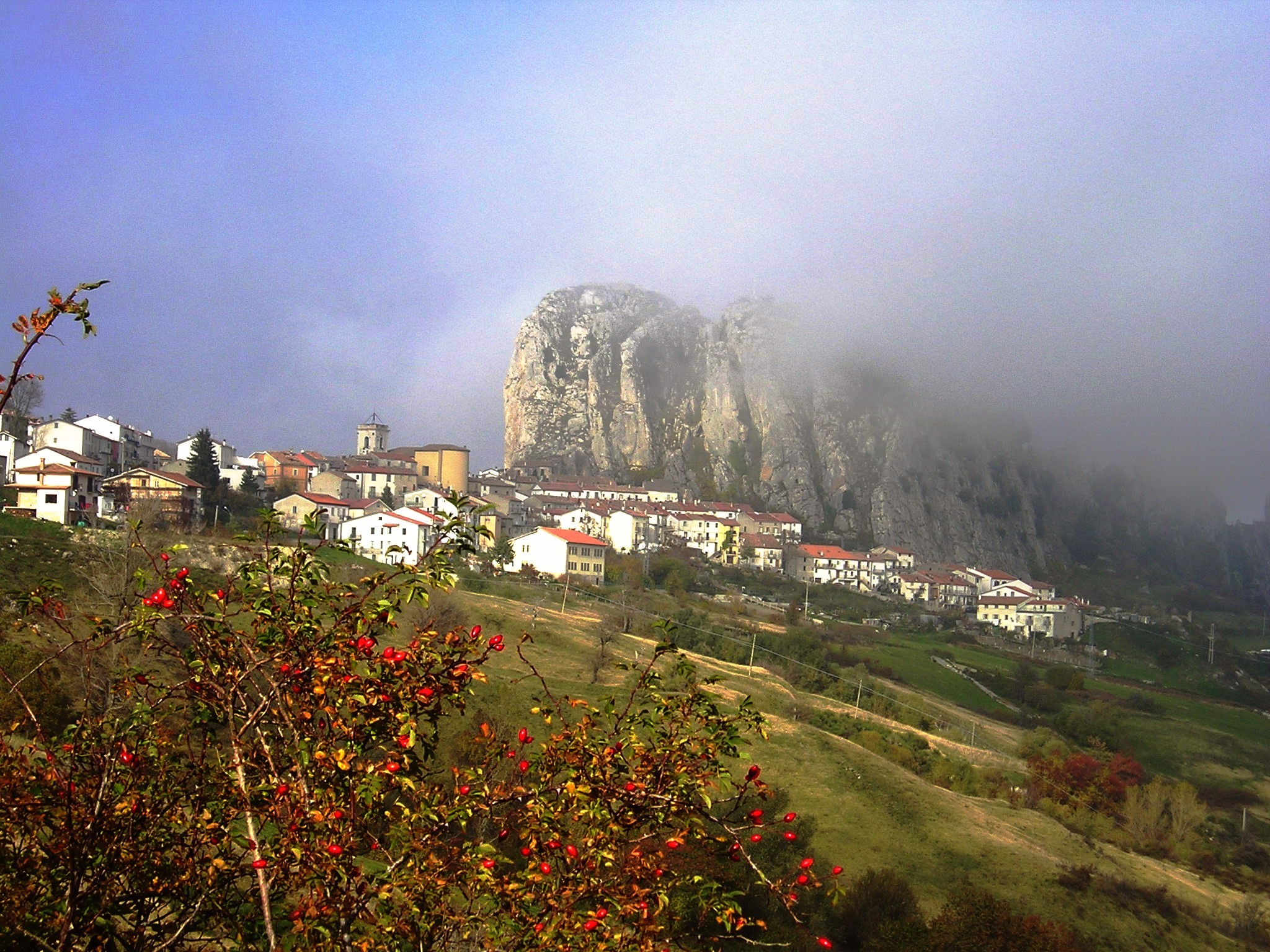
- View of Pizzoferrato

- Location within Italy Location within Abruzzo
- Coordinates: 41°55′N 14°14′E
- Country: Italy
- Region: Abruzzo
- Province: Chieti (CH)
- Frazioni: Castiglione, Collalto, Turchi, Valle del Sole

Area
  - Total: 30 km^{2} (12 sq mi)
- Elevation: 1,251 m (4,104 ft)

Population (2004)
  - Total: 1,163
  - Density: 39/km^{2} (100/sq mi)
- Demonym: Pizzoferratesi
- Time zone: UTC+1 (CET)
  - Summer (DST): UTC+2 (CEST)
- Postal code: 66040
- Dialing code: 0872
- ISTAT code: 069066

Pizzoferrato is a comune and town in the Province of Chieti in the Abruzzo region of Italy.

== History ==
Pizzoferrato was founded in the Middle Ages. Its high vantage point helped protect it from bandits. Very few documents remain so much of the legal history of the town is lost. The church and stronghold of St. Nicola and Madonna del Girone date back to the 10th century.

== Geography ==
Pizzoferrato is in a rocky, mountainous region of Chieti. The defining characteristic of the town is the large cliff around which it is situated. The surrounding countryside is a patchwork of pastures and forests.

== Landmarks ==
=== Church of St. Nicola and Madonna del Girone ===
This church is a ruin located on the summit of the cliff around which Pizzoferrato is located. It shows signs of also being a stronghold as well as a church.

The church is made of stone with a plaster facade. Remains of statues of St. Nicholas of Bari and St. Dominic. The church bell resides in a tower to the right of the front entrance and it was cast in the town of Agnone.

=== Church of San Rocco ===
The Church of San Rocco resides in the Piazza San Rocco and was built on the ruins of the Chapel of San Rocco. It dates back to the second half of the nineteenth century.

=== Majella National Park ===
Maiella National Park is a national park located in the provinces of Chieti, Pescara and L'Aquila, in the region Abruzzo, Italy. It is centered on the Maiella massif and has an area of 740.95 km².

The park contains about 500 kilometres of hiking trails, cave paintings in Grotta Sant'Angelo and Grotta del Cavallone.

== Notable people ==
- Church of San Rocco
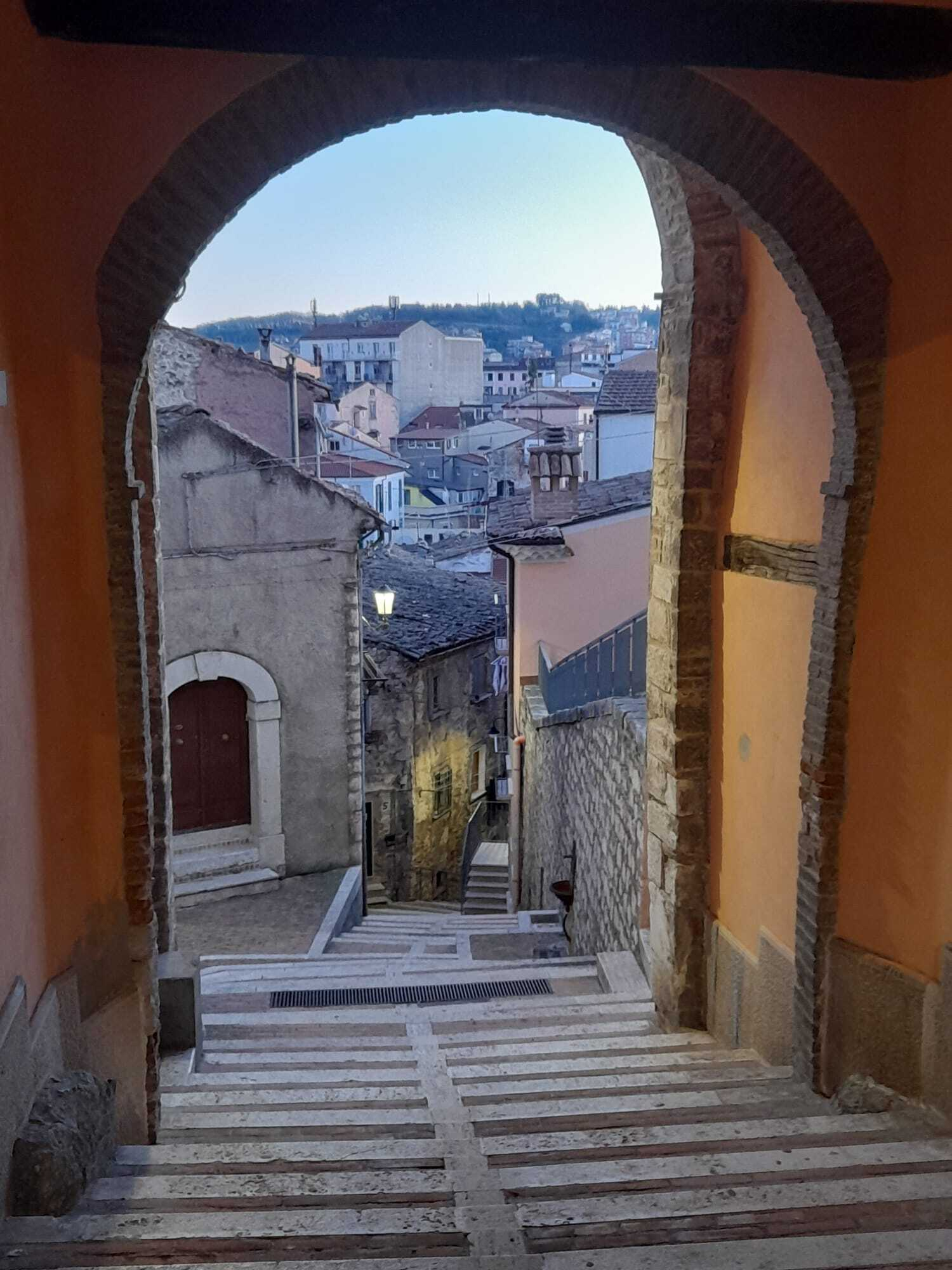
  Bruno Sammartino – (1935–2018) former wrestler with the WWE. He held the WWWF Championship twice. The Sammartino family escaped Pizzoferrato during World War II when the Nazis invaded and committed atrocities against the civilians. In 2017, a statue was erected there in his honor when Sammartino returned for a special visit.
