= WWF International Tag Team Championship =

Wrestling competition

Details
- Promotion: World Wide Wrestling Federation/World Wrestling Federation (WWWF/WWF); New Japan Pro-Wrestling (NJPW)
- Date established: June 1, 1969 (original); May 24, 1985 (second)
- Date retired: 1972 (original); October 31, 1985 (second)

Other names
- WWWF International Tag Team Championship (1969-1972); WWF International Tag Team Championship (1985)
Statistics
- First champions: Rising Suns (Mitsu Arakawa and Toru Tanaka)
- Final champions: Tatsumi Fujinami and Kengo Kimura
- Most reigns: As tag team (2 reigns): The Mongols (Bepo and Geeto); As individual (3 reigns): Geto Mongol
- Longest reign: The Mongols (Bepo and Geeto Mongol) (1st reign, 368 days)
- Shortest reign: Bruno Sammartino and The Battman (0 days) (Note: The WWWF/WWF (now WWE) did not recognize the title reign of Bruno Sammartino and The Battman and instead recognized the reign of Sammartino and Dominic DeNucci as the shortest at 14 days.)
- Oldest champion: Tarzan Tyler (43 years, 343 days)
- Youngest champion: Bepo (22 years, 244 days)
- Heaviest champion: The Mongols (Bepo and Geto Mongol) (563 lbs combined)
- Lightest champion: Kengo Kimura and Tatsumi Fujinami (463 lbs combined)

The WWF International Tag Team Championship was a tag team championship in the World Wide Wrestling Federation from 1969 to 1972 and in the renamed World Wrestling Federation and New Japan Pro-Wrestling for a short time in 1985.

== Names ==
| Name | Years |
|---|---|
| WWWF International Tag Team Championship | June 1, 1969 – 1972 |
| WWF International Tag Team Championship | May 24, 1985 – October 31, 1985 |

== Reigns ==
Over the championship's 16-year history, there were eight reigns between seven teams composed of 13 individual champions. The Rising Suns (Mitsu Arakawa and Toru Tanaka) were the inaugural champions. As a team, The Mongols (Bepo and Geeto) has the most reigns at two times, while individually, Geeto has the most reigns at three times. The Mongols' first reign was the longest at 368 days, while Bruno Sammartino and Dominic DeNucci's reign was the shortest at 14 days. Tarzan Tyler was the oldest champion at 43 years old, while Bepo was the youngest at 22 years old.

Kengo Kimura and Tatsumi Fujinami were the final champions with a reign that lest for 159 days, before the title was deactivated for the second time in its history.

Key
| No. | Overall reign number |
| Reign | Reign number for the specific team—reign numbers for the individuals are in parentheses, if different |
| Days | Number of days held |
| † | Championship change is unrecognized by the promotion |

| No. | Champion | Championship change | | | Reign statistics | | Notes | Ref. |
| No. | Champion | Date | Event | Location | Reign | Days | Notes | Ref. |
|---|---|---|---|---|---|---|---|---|
World Wide Wrestling Federation (WWWF)
| 1 | The Rising Suns (Mitsu Arakawa and Toru Tanaka) | June 1, 1969 | — | Japan | 1 | 190 | Were announced as having won a (fictitious) tournament in Japan to become the first champions. | |
| 2 | Tony Marino and Víctor Rivera | December 9, 1969 | House show | New York, NY | 1 | 188 | This was a two-out-of-three falls match. | |
| † | Bruno Sammartino and The Battman | December 13, 1969 | House Show | Pittsburgh, PA | 1 | — | Defeat the Rising Suns (Mitsu Arakawa and Toru Tanaka) to win the championship; the title change four days prior in New York City was not recognized in Pittsburgh. Despite this match, Victor Rivera and Tony Marino continued to be recognized as champions in all areas of the WWWF territory outside of Pittsburgh. | |
| 3 | The Mongols (Bepo and Geto) | June 15, 1970 | House show | New York, NY | 1 | 368 | This was a two-out-of-three falls match. The Mongols began defending the championship solely in Pittsburgh beginning in February 1971. | |
| 4 | Bruno Sammartino (2) and Dominic DeNucci | June 18, 1971 | House show | Pittsburgh, PA | 1 | 14 | This was a two-out-of-three falls match. | |
| 5 | The Mongols (Bepo and Geeto) | July 2, 1971 | House Show | Pittsburgh, PA | 2 | 133 | | |
| 6 | Luke Graham and Tarzan Tyler | November 12, 1971 | House Show | Pittsburgh, PA | 1 | 36 | Graham and Tyler additionally held the WWWF World Tag Team Championship during this reign, having previously won that title on June 3, 1971. | |
| 7 | Geeto Mongol (3) and Johnny DeFazio | December 18, 1971 | House show | Pittsburgh, PA | 1 | 197 | | |
| — | Deactivated | July 2, 1972 | — | — | — | — | The championship was abandoned when the WWWF's local Pittsburgh partner promotion was sold to the National Wrestling Federation. | |
World Wrestling Federation (WWF)
| 8 | Kengo Kimura and Tatsumi Fujinami | May 24, 1985 | IWGP and WWF Championship Series | Kobe, Japan | 1 | 159 | Defeated Adrian Adonis and Dick Murdoch in a tournament final via countout to win the revived championship. | |
| — | Deactivated | October 31, 1985 | — | — | — | — | The championship was abandoned when the WWF ended its partnership with NJPW. | |

== Combined reigns ==
=== By team ===
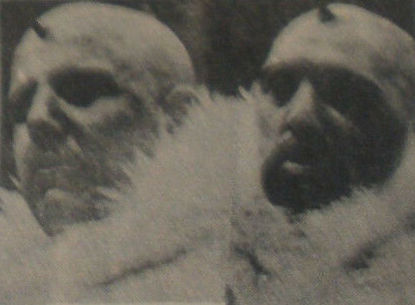
Record two-time champions The Mongols (Bepo (left) and Geeto (right))

| Rank | Team | No. of reigns | Combined days |
|---|---|---|---|
| 1 | The Mongols (Bepo and Geeto) | 2 | 501 |
| 2 | The Rising Suns (Mitsu Arakawa and Toru Tanaka) | 1 | 190 |
| 3 | Tony Marino and Victor Rivera | 1 | 188 |
| 4 | Kengo Kimura and Tatsumi Fujinami | 1 | 159 |
| 5 | Luke Graham and Tarzan Tyler | 1 | 36 |
| 6 | Bruno Sammartino and Dominic DeNucci | 1 | 14 |
| 6 | Bepo Mongol and Johnny De Fazio | 1 | 14 |

=== By wrestler ===
| Rank | Wrestler | No. of reigns | Combined days |
|---|---|---|---|
| 1 | Geeto | 3 | 698 |
| 2 | Bepo | 2 | 501 |
| 3 | Mitsu Arakawa | 1 | 190 |
| 3 | Toru Tanaka | 1 | 190 |
| 5 | Tony Marino | 2 | 188 |
| 6 | Victor Rivera | 1 | 185 |
| 7 | Kengo Kimura | 1 | 159 |
| 7 | Tatsumi Fujinami | 1 | 159 |
| 9 | Luke Graham | 1 | 36 |
| 9 | Tarzan Tyler | 1 | 36 |
| 11 | Bruno Sammartino | 2 | 14 |
| 11 | Dominic DeNucci | 1 | 14 |
| 11 | Johnny De Fazio | 1 | 14 |

== See also ==
- List of former championships in WWE
- Tag team championships in WWE

== Footnotes ==
Sporting positions
| Preceded by WWWF United States Tag Team Championship | World (Wide) Wrestling Federation Tag Team Championship; 1969–1972 | Succeeded by WWWF World Tag Team Championship |
| Preceded by NWA North American Tag Team Championship | New Japan Pro-Wrestling Tag Team Championship; 1985 | Succeeded by IWGP Tag Team Championship |
