= Johnny DeFazio =

American professional wrestler (1940–2021)

Personal information
- Born: October 30, 1940
- Died: February 26, 2021 (aged 80) Pittsburgh, Pennsylvania

Professional wrestling career
- Ring name: Johnny DeFazio
- Debut: 1960s
- Retired: 1980s

Johnny DeFazio (November 30, 1940 – February 26, 2021) was an American professional wrestler from Pittsburgh, Pennsylvania.

== Professional wrestling career ==
DeFazio was a fan favorite and was popular in the 1960s and 1970s. He wrestled for the old Studio Wrestling program on WIIC-TV in Pittsburgh, hosted by Bill Cardille. He was a four-time winner of the World Wide Wrestling Federation's Junior Heavyweight Championship. He also was active in the United Steelworkers of America (he was the union's director in Pennsylvania) and was an Allegheny County councilman from 1999 until 2019.

== Death ==
Johnny DeFazio died on February 26, 2021.

== Championships ==
- World Wide Wrestling Federation
  - WWWF International Tag Team Championship (1 time) - with Geeto Mongol
  - WWWF Junior Heavyweight Championship (4 times)
