= Mark Curtis Memorial Reunion =

2005 professional wrestling event

- Promotion: Freelance
- Date: May 5, 2005
- City: Johnson City, Tennessee
- Venue: Freedom Hall
- Attendance: 350

Event chronology
← Previous; Curtis Comes Home	Next → N/A

The Mark Curtis Memorial Reunion was a professional wrestling memorial show produced by Pam Hildebrand-Clark, which took place on May 5, 2005, at Freedom Hall in Johnson City, Tennessee. The show was held in memory of wrestling referee Mark Curtis, who died of stomach cancer at his home in Talbott, Tennessee on September 8, 1999, with the proceeds donated to the Children's Miracle Network.

Many of the Curtis Comes Home participants returned to take part in the 2005 edition. Like the original event, the Mark Curtis Memorial Reunion served as an unofficial reunion show for Smokey Mountain Wrestling where Curtis had served as head referee. Johnson City's Freedom Hall was a monthly venue for the promotion during the early 1990s. One commentator wrote that the venue choice, in addition to the "small but enthusiastic" crowd, gave the event a nostalgic feel of an SMW show.

Six professional wrestling matches, two of which were for championships, were featured on the card. The main attraction on the event card was a tag team match for the Tri-Cities Tag Team Championship with Mick Foley and Shane Douglas, accompanied by former trainer Dominic DeNucci, versus Al Snow and D'Lo Brown managed by Les Thatcher. The championship itself was an "unsanctioned title" with the four men instead battling for the right to call themselves the "best friends" of Mark Curtis. On the undercard, Terry Taylor defeated Tom Prichard in a standard wrestling match for the Texas Heavyweight Championship. The return of Count Grog, coming out of retirement for a special one-night appearance, was also promoted for the card.

The show drew only 350 people, a much smaller number compared to the 1,500 fans that had attended Curtis Comes Home five years earlier. In spite of the low attendance, the show's surprise main event was highly praised. Tim Whitehead of PWInsider.com found the show very enjoyable and that "everyone involved deserves praise for volunteering their time for this tribute to a great representative of the best side of the wrestling business". Declaration of Independents and WrestleView.com echoed these sentiments but were less enthusiastic about many of the undercard matches.

== Event ==
Prior to the show, wrestling fans had the opportunity to interact with D'Lo Brown, Dominic DeNucci, Shane Douglas, Mick Foley, Tom Prichard, Al Snow and Terry Taylor in a special autograph and photo session. Johnny Grunge, Sandy Scott and Tracy Smothers were among those scheduled to attend but later cancelled.

The show was opened by former Smokey Mountain Wrestling ring announcer Tommy Noe who brought out SMW television announcers Chip Kessler and Les Thatcher as part of the announcing team for the event. The three men were subsequently joined by the rest of the roster for a ten-bell salute to Chris Candido, one of SMW's top heel performers during the mid-1990s, and a participant of Curtis Comes Home, who had died the previous week.

This was followed by local East Tennessee wrestler Mike Cooper who sang the American national anthem to start the event.

=== Preliminary matches ===
The first match on the card was a battle royal. It featured 12 men including stars from Mark Curtis' home state of Pennsylvania, Lord Zoltan and Preston Steele, as well as Southern wrestlers The Ace Crusader, Count Grog, Dirty Dick Flanagan, Tony Givens, Beau James, Dave "The Science" Pillman, Dave Renegade, Dan Richards, Super Destroyer and The Hillbillies (Bucky and Cletus). Flanagan scored an upset victory by eliminating Steele to win the battle royal.

After the opening match ended, Noe introduced Mick Foley who was returning as a special guest referee. The retired wrestler came to the ring and spoke to the crowd about Mark Curtis, describing his refereeing career in Smokey Mountain Wrestling and World Championship Wrestling, and referencing the Curtis Comes Home show held only a few weeks before his death. He also noted the show's surprisingly small crowd and claimed that a rival promoter, later alleged to be Terry Landell, had torn down flyers promoting the charity show which Foley called "a new all-time low for pro wrestling". Foley ended his tribute by informing the audience that all the performers on the show were working for free and that "there aren't many people [he'd] be willing to work free for, but Mark Curtis [was] one of them".

Foley then told the crowd that he wanted to publicly acknowledge two men who had greatly influenced his wrestling career. Before he could finish, Al Snow and D'Lo Brown came out to accept this honor. Foley, however, told the WWE superstars that he had not been talking about them. Snow was outraged and claimed that he had come up with the idea for "Mr. Socko". Foley called this "the greatest exaggeration in wrestling history" to which Snow answered "the only exaggeration would be to call [Foley] a professional wrestler and a snappy dresser". At this point, Foley revealed the two men as Dominic DeNucci and Shane Douglas; Curtis, Foley and Douglas had all trained under DeNucci during the 1980s. A heated argument between Foley and Snow ensued setting up a tag team match between the four men, with DeNucci and Les Thatcher as the cornermen, for the kayfabe Tri-Cities Tag Team Championship.

The next match of the event was between Eddie Golden and K. C. Thunder. Thunder was accompanied by manager Allan Barrie who taunted the largely Southern crowd under his "Duke of New York" persona. Golden was able to hit Thunder with his frog splash finisher but Barrie pulled referee Ed Foster out of the ring before he could count the pinfall. While Barrie and Foster argued outside the ring, Thunder struck Golden with brass knuckles and pinned Golden when the referee turned around. Initially declared the winner, Foster found the foreign object on Thunder and awarded the match to his opponent via disqualification. Afterwards, Golden confronted Barrie over his outside interference. As Golden prepared to hit him, Barrie pleaded for mercy pointing out that he was wearing glasses. Golden seemingly relented but then took the manager's glasses off, handed them to the referee, and knocked out Barrie in one punch.

The third match of the event saw "Ruthless" Roger Anderson wrestle Timber the Lumberjack. Anderson's opponent was led by Count Grog, his former manager, who interfered in the bout several times. The two men brawled for eight minutes before Timber brandished an axe wrapped in barbed wire. Anderson kicked the axe into Timber's face and covered him for a three-count.

Next was a tag team match with Tim Horner and Cody Michaels facing The Turbanators (Jahid and Saheed) of NWA Blue Ridge. The latter team had won the then vacant tag team championship in Grundy, Virginia the previous night, however, the titles were not on the line. Under the direction of their manager Perry James, The Turbanators employed an anti-American gimmick and ring style similar to The Iron Sheik. They double-teamed Horner for much of the match but Michaels was able to score the winning pinfall when James accidentally hit one of the Turbanators with the team's Iranian flag.

In the featured match on the undercard, Terry Taylor pinned Dr. Tom Prichard following a forearm smash to win the Texas Heavyweight Championship. Prichard, a notorious "heel" in SMW as a member of The Heavenly Bodies, had been cheered as a "fan favorite" by the crowd.

=== Main event ===
The last match of the night was the main event between Mick Foley and Shane Douglas teaming against Al Snow and D'Lo Brown. Dominic DeNucci and Les Thatcher served as the cornermen respectively. It was announced that both teams were wrestling for the "Tri-Cities Tag Team Championship", a fictional title representing Johnson City, Kingsport and Bristol, Tennessee, but more importantly deciding who were Mark Curtis' best friends.

The bout was a mix of wild brawling and comedy wrestling from both sides. Snow performed an exaggerated version of "The People's Elbow" while Foley responded with an unsuccessful attempt to do "The Worm". This was continued by Brown, who mimicked many of Hulk Hogan's signature maneuvers before a near pinfall on Douglas, and concluded with Douglas delivering "Stone Cold Stunners" (and middle fingers) to both his opponents. At one point in the match, it appeared Snow had legitimately broken his elbow after Foley tossed him out of the ring with a lariat clothesline. The match was temporarily stopped and Foley jumped out of the ring to check on his opponent. Snow revealed he was feigning his injury and rammed Foley's head into the ring post. Foley's team won the match with a double pinfall; Douglas pinned Brown with a belly-to-belly suplex and Foley pinned Snow using Mr. Socko. DeNucci and Thatcher entered the ring in the final moments of the bout and saw the 75-year-old DeNucci score a pinfall as well.

Snow blamed his tag team partner for the loss and, as the two began arguing, someone from the front row threw an object into the ring which he used to knock out Brown. The weapon was revealed to be "Head", an actual mannequin's head Snow had been using in World Wrestling Entertainment. The night concluded with Snow taking the house microphone and telling the audience that Curtis' friends were not only the wrestlers who participated but the fans in attendance. Foley, whose team had "won" the right to call themselves Curtis' "best friends", had the last word however. After Snow had returned to the locker room, Foley told the audience "yeah...we're all his friends, but I think [Mark Curtis] liked me and Shane a little bit better!"

== Results ==
No.	Results	Stipulations	Times
1	Big Dick Flanagan defeated 12 other participants by last eliminating Preston Steele (Note: The other participants included were: The Ace Crusader, Beau James, Count Grog, Dan Richards, Dave Pillman, Dave Renegade, Lord Zoltan, Super Destroyer and The Hillbillies (Bucky and Cletus).)	Battle royal	12:27
2	Eddie Golden defeated K. C. Thunder (with The Duke of New York) by DQ	Singles match	10:47
3	Roger Anderson defeated Timber the Lumberjack (with Count Grog)	Singles match	08:05
4	Cody Michaels and Tim Horner defeated The Turbinators (Saheed and Jahid) (with Perry James)	Tag Team match	13:30
5	Terry Taylor defeated Tom Prichard (c)	Singles match for the Texas Heavyweight Championship	06:21
6	Mick Foley and Shane Douglas (with Dominic DeNucci) defeated Al Snow and D'Lo Brown (with Les Thatcher)	Tag Team match for the Tri-Cities Tag Team Championship	25:27
(c) / – the champion(s) heading into the match
