= Happy Birthday to Me (1981 film) =

1981 Canadian slasher film by J. Lee Thompson

- Theatrical release poster
- Directed by: J. Lee Thompson
- Written by: Timothy Bond; Peter Jobin; John Saxton; John Beaird (uncredited)
- Screenplay by: Timothy Bond; Peter Jobin; John Saxton
- Story by: John Saxton
- Produced by: John Dunning; Andre Link
- Starring: Melissa Sue Anderson; Glenn Ford; Lawrence Dane; Sharon Acker; Frances Hyland; Tracey E. Bregman; Lisa Langlois
- Cinematography: Miklós Lente
- Edited by: Debra Karen
- Music by: Bo Harwood; Lance Rubin
- Production companies: Famous Players; The Birthday Film Company
- Distributed by: Columbia Pictures
- Release date: May 15, 1981
- Running time: 111 minutes
- Country: Canada
- Language: English
- Budget: $3.5 million—$4.7 million
- Box office: $10.6 million

Happy Birthday to Me is a 1981 Canadian slasher film directed by J. Lee Thompson and starring Melissa Sue Anderson, Glenn Ford, Lawrence Dane, Sharon Acker, Frances Hyland, Tracey Bregman, and Lisa Langlois. Set at a New England high school academy, the film follows a series of brutal murders of students who are part of an elite clique in the days leading up to the birthday of one of its members.

Happy Birthday to Me was filmed in Montreal and upstate New York in 1980.

Happy Birthday to Me was distributed by Columbia Pictures, who invested $4 million in promotional materials. The studio marketed the film for its elaborate murder sequences, billed as "six of the most bizarre murders you will ever see." The film was released in the United States and Canada on May 15, 1981. It received mostly negative reviews from critics and grossed $10.6 million against a $3.5 million budget.

== Plot ==
Virginia "Ginny" Wainwright is a pretty and popular high school senior at Crawford Academy, a member of the school's "Top Ten," an elite clique of the most privileged and popular students. One of the Top Ten, Bernadette O'Hara, is attacked by an unseen assailant on her way to meet the group at a tavern. Bernadette manages to flee her assailant and runs into an unseen individual whom she is familiar with. She begs for their help, but the person slashes her neck with a straight razor.

At the tavern, the Top Ten become concerned when Bernadette does not arrive. Upon leaving, the group sees the nearby drawbridge raising and decide to play a game of chicken. Ginny is pushed into a car by Ann Thomerson, and each of the group attempt to cross the bridge as it raises; the car Ginny is in barely clears the bridge, crashing as it meets the other side. Distraught, Ginny runs home, stopping at her mother's grave in an adjacent cemetery. At her home, Etienne, a Top Ten member, breaks into Ginny's room and steals her underwear.

Bernadette fails to show up at school the following day. Ginny, who is plagued by repressed memories, visits her on-call psychiatrist, Dr. David Faraday, with whom she previously underwent an experimental brain tissue restoration procedure after surviving a harrowing accident at the drawbridge. As Ginny attempts to resume her normal life, her fellow Top Ten members are violently murdered: Etienne is garrotted when his scarf gets thrown into the spokes of his motorcycle, and Greg's neck is crushed while lifting weights. Ann and Ginny grow suspicious of Alfred, an odd duck in their group who is infatuated with Ginny. The two break into Alfred's house and discover he is an elaborate prosthetic make up artist with a hyperrealistic replica of Bernadette's head. Alfred secretly follows Ginny to her mother's grave, and Ginny stabs him to death with a pair of garden shears.

On the weekend of Ginny's 18th birthday, her father leaves for a business trip. After a school dance, Ginny invites Steve to her house and prepares shish kebabs. The two kiss, and Ginny begins to feed Steve the kebab, but she violently shoves the skewer down his throat, killing him.

Ann arrives at Ginny's house the next morning and finds Ginny taking a shower. In the shower, Ginny has a flashback of her mother's death: Four years ago, her mother, a newly inducted socialite, invites the Top Ten to Ginny's birthday celebration at their guest cottage, but no guests arrive. Ginny tearfully mentions the group are attending a party Ann is throwing instead. Humiliated, her mother drives drunk in the rain with Ginny to the Thomersons' house, where she is denied entry by Mr. Thomerson's gatekeeper. Enraged, she attempts to drive across a raising drawbridge, causing their car to fall into the water. Ginny's mother drowns, pinned beneath the steering wheel. Ginny manages to swim above the surface. A passing ship injures Ginny's head, revealing why she needs the experimental brain procedure.

Ginny discovers Ann's corpse in the bathroom. Paranoid that she may be murdering her friends during blackout episodes, Ginny calls for Dr. Faraday. When he arrives, much to Ginny's confusion, there is no trace of Ann's body. Later, Ginny confronts him over her procedure before murdering him with a fireplace poker. Mr. Wainright returns home during a thunderstorm for Ginny's birthday and finds blood splattered across Ginny's bedroom. He flees hysterically and finds one of Ginny's friends, Amelia, standing in the yard in what seems to be a state of shock, clutching a wrapped gift. In the cemetery, he discovers his late wife's grave appears to have been robbed, with Dr. Faraday's corpse lying beside it.

Mr. Wainwright notices a light on inside the family's guest cottage. Inside, he finds the dead bodies of each member of the Top Ten positioned around a table alongside his dead wife's corpse. Ginny enters the room with a birthday cake, singing "Happy Birthday" to herself, seeming to have lost her mind. Mr. Wainwright cries. Ginny suddenly slashes his throat. He dies, failing to notice another girl sitting at the table, face down. Ginny then goes toward the girl whose face is shown to look just like Ginny's. As the seated Ginny wakes, the murderous Ginny we have seen throughout the film yells that she is Ginny's sister and did it all for her, as she ruined her last party. Suddenly the two Ginnys struggle and the other girl is revealed to be Ann, who has disguised herself as Ginny with an elaborate latex mask (presumably made by Alfred). Ann removes the mask, ranting and raving about her father's affair with Ginny's mother and how it destroyed her family. Ann reveals that she and Ginny are half-sisters through an affair between Mr. Thomerson and Ginny's mother. Ginny manages to wrestle the knife from Ann and stabs her to death. As she stands over Ann's corpse holding the bloodied knife, a police officer enters the cottage and says, "What have you done?"

== Cast ==
- Melissa Sue Anderson as Virginia "Ginny" Wainwright
- Glenn Ford as Dr. David Faraday
- Lawrence Dane as Harold "Hal" Wainwright
- Sharon Acker as Estelle Wainwright
- Frances Hyland as Mrs. Patterson
- Tracey E. Bregman as Ann Thomerson
- Jack Blum as Alfred Morris
- Matt Craven as Steve Maxwell
- Lenore Zann as Maggie
- David Eisner as Rudi
- Michel-René Labelle as Etienne Vercures
- Richard Rebiere as Greg Hellman
- Lesleh Donaldson as Bernadette O'Hara
- Lisa Langlois as Amelia
- Ron Lea as Amelia's Date

== Production ==
=== Development ===
Happy Birthday to Me was produced by John Dunning and André Link, as a Cinépix production. Dunning and Link would team up again on another Canadian slasher, My Bloody Valentine (1981), which went into production within a week of Happy Birthday to Me wrapping; however, My Bloody Valentine was actually released first, rushed to meet a February 11, 1981 release date in time for Valentine's Day. Keen to get their classier, bigger-budgeted Happy Birthday to Me released, Dunning and Link quickly realized that gimmicks were being used up by other slasher movies in the wake of John Carpenter’s Halloween (1978) and Sean S. Cunningham’s Friday the 13th (1980). Dunning and Link felt that a slasher film centered around a birthday could have universal appeal. They hired John Saxton, a University of Toronto English professor, to develop the story. The subplot involving Virginia's brain injury came from Dunning reading an article about regenerating frogs with electricity; he figured this could form the basis for a murder mystery where a girl suffers flashbacks and blackouts yet is unsure of her role in the mayhem around her.

A third draft of the film's screenplay, dated April 1980, features a different plot twist in which Virginia is revealed to be the killer, possessed by the spirit of her deceased mother. Although this ending logistically makes more sense than the ending that was filmed, the filmmakers thought that what was originally scripted was not climactic enough. Still, the majority of the film does point to this original ending, which indicates the switch came well into production. This version of the script also features a good number of scenes that were either never shot or rewritten, including some that show more clearly Alfred's love for Virginia and Virginia's difficult relationship with her father. The script was completely reworked by screenwriting team Timothy Bond and Peter Jobin before production started.

Director J. Lee Thompson had actively been looking to direct a thriller, and was hired as director. In the press material for the film, he stated: "What attracted me to this script was that the young people stood out as vivid, individual characters. The difference between a good chiller and exploitative junk, at least in my opinion, is whether or not you care about the victims".

=== Casting ===
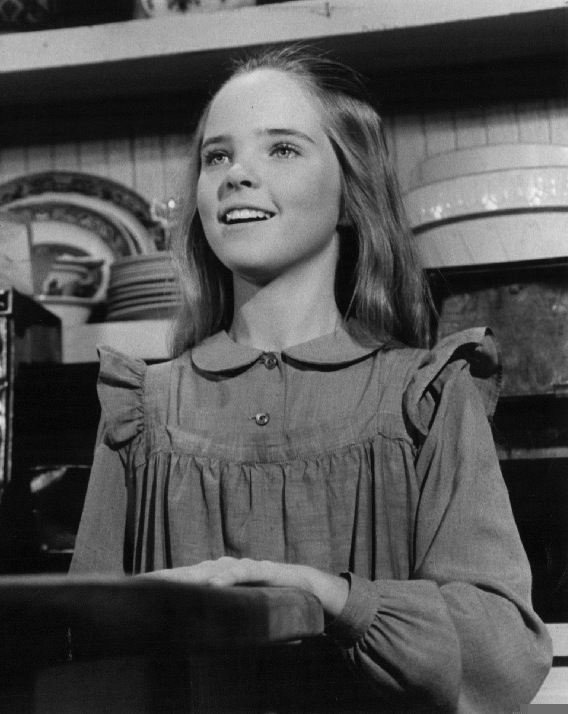
Melissa Sue Anderson, known for her role on the NBC series Little House on the Prairie, was cast as the film's lead character.

Actress Melissa Sue Anderson, who had garnered childhood fame for her portrayal of Mary Ingalls on the television series Little House on the Prairie, was cast in the film's lead, marking her major feature debut. Lisa Langlois auditioned for the role of Ann, but the role went to Tracey Bregman instead.

Glenn Ford signed onto the project, portraying the role of Virginia's psychiatrist, as he was an admirer of director J. Lee Thompson.

=== Filming ===
Happy Birthday to Me began filming in early July 1980.

The film's make-up effects were done by special effects artist Tom Burman (who replaced Stéphan Dupuis just three weeks before the cameras were due to start rolling). Dupuis later did the duties on another bigger budget Canadian slasher, Visiting Hours (1982), but left the production for undisclosed reasons. Ironically, in an issue of Fangoria from 1981, Burman criticizes the level of gore in films at that time. Director Thompson became known for tossing buckets of blood about on the set of the film to increase the on-screen gore. According to producer John Dunning, with the assistance of special effects man Tom Burman, Thompson "would be splashing blood all over the place".

Happy Birthday to Me completed filming in September 1980. Much of it was shot in and around Loyola College in Montreal, while the drawbridge scenes were actually filmed in Phoenix, New York, just outside Syracuse. The producers found it difficult to find the right bridge closer to the main production, as the expansion of the Highway system had made them increasingly rare. The whole town of Phoenix came to watch the dangerous stunts, where a total of fifteen cars were junked, and one stunt driver was hospitalized with two broken ankles. The bridge itself has since been removed and replaced by a bridge farther to the north. Additional photography occurred on the campuses of Concordia University and McGill University.

During production, the film's screenplay underwent rewrites, including an entirely new ending that featured Ann as the real killer instead of Ginny. According to actress Melissa Sue Anderson, her character of Ginny "was so convincing as the good girl, they didn’t want to sacrifice the audience’s sympathy," leading screenwriters Timothy Bond and Peter Jobin to rework Saxton's screenplay. This mid-production alteration required the special effects team to craft a plaster cast of Anderson's face to design a latex mask, which Ann is revealed to be wearing in the finale.

== Music ==
Bo Harwood and Lance Rubin provided the film's score. Syreeta, one-time wife of Stevie Wonder, provided the closing track, composed by Lance Rubin that plays over the credits.

== Release ==
Columbia Pictures submitted the film for review by the Motion Picture Association of America multiple times, and the film was repeatedly granted an X rating due to its graphic violence. The studio truncated some of the film's gorier sequences, among them Amelia's axe murder sequence, before it was finally granted an R rating. The film was originally planned to be released on the Friday before Easter 1981, but was delayed. Instead, the film was theatrically released in North America on May 15, 1981 in 1,124 theaters.

=== Marketing ===
Columbia Pictures acquired Happy Birthday to Me for $3.5 million, following Paramount Pictures' lead in buying Friday the 13th the year before. Columbia reportedly paid as much to promote the film as it cost to make. The promotional materials boasted the unusual death sequences as "six of the most bizarre murders you will ever see". The theatrical poster featured sub-taglines reading: "John will never eat shish kebab again" and "Steven will never ride a motorcycle again", despite there being no character named "John" in the film, and Steven being the character who dies by a shish kekab; Etienne’s death involves a motorcycle.

Dunning and Link were displeased with the advertising campaign that Columbia Pictures had planned; they thought it should have been more subtle and worried it might put off as many people as it attracted. They were concerned that only a few of the film’s murders were bizarre and the audience might feel cheated.

Columbia Pictures distributed a promotional manual for Happy Birthday to Me containing numerous ideas for cinemas to promote the film. Although it is not clear how many picture houses embraced these promotions, one of the more colorful ideas involved staging a mini-recreation of the film's final scene with a butchered birthday cake with crimson candles surrounded by glittering birthday party hats set upon a fake coffin. People celebrating their own birthdays were incentivized to bring family and friends to receive items including T-shirts and party hats. Another suggestion was to have a staff member, dressed in funeral black, prevent anyone from entering the theatre during the final ten minutes. Those in line would then be offered "a bite-sized slice of Virginia's birthday cake" from the concession stand.

The promotion manual also featured many ideas for radio disc jockeys to promote the film, including a special 'scream in'. Callers would be asked questions such as, "How would you react if you went to a birthday party … and you were the only person at the dinner table who was still alive?" Those with the best set of lungs would win free passes to the film. The manual also encouraged the DJ's to attend dressed as funeral attendants and give each girl a white lily and each boy a blood-red carnation.

The film was also advertised with trailers at the cinema and on TV. Most trailers culminated with a birthday cake being split with an axe, although an axe does not feature in the film.

=== Home media ===
Sony Pictures Home Entertainment released Happy Birthday to Me on DVD in 2004 with an entirely different, uncredited musical score not used in the original cut. In October 2009, Anchor Bay Entertainment re-released the film on DVD with original score restored.

In 2012, the film premiered on Blu-ray through Mill Creek Entertainment on a double-feature disc paired with the original When a Stranger Calls (1979); this release, like the 2009 DVD, features the original 1981 musical score. The United Kingdom-based home media company Indicator Films released a region-free two-disc Blu-ray and DVD combination package in December 2016, which featured promotional materials, a commentary track, and both the original and alternate musical score. Mill Creek re-released the film as a standalone Blu-ray featuring a retro VHS-inspired slipcover in October 2018. In October 2022, Kino Lorber issued another Blu-ray edition with newly commissioned bonus materials.

== Reception ==
=== Box office ===
Happy Birthday to Me earned $3,712,597 during its opening weekend in the United States and Canada. By June 1, 1981, it had earned $7,562,660. It ultimately went on to gross a total of $10.6 million at the North American box office.

=== Critical response ===
Vincent Canby in The New York Times called it a confused ripoff of Friday the 13th and Prom Night (both released in 1980). James Harwood in Variety wrote that the film gets "dumber and dumber until the fitful finale". Linda Gross of the Los Angeles Times referred to the film as a "well-directed, suspenseful and nauseatingly violent horror movie" that is "gratuitously mean", commending it as technically well-made but criticizing it for its violent content. The Baltimore Evening Sun's Lou Cedrone wrote "it is sad to know that a director of this stature has descended to this, a bloody horror film. The movie has been done with professionalism, but in the end, like The Fan, Happy Birthday to Me is so much bloodletting, all of it in vivid color". Siskel & Ebert chose it as one of their "Dogs of the Week" on an episode of their show in 1981; Gene Siskel summed up his opinion of the picture as follows: "Make a wish and blow out the projector." Movie historian Leonard Maltin seemed to agree, citing the film as a "BOMB" and noting that "...Glenn Ford hits rock bottom with this bloody exploitation epic; he must have been desperate for the work."

Candice Russell of the Fort Lauderdale News praised the film as a "more than competently made chiller", adding that director Thompson "plays out the scenes where we anticipate mayhem like a virtuoso violinist".

Ron Cowan of Statesman Journal commended Anderson’s acting and Thompson’s direction, and wrote that he "develops the characters of the young actors enough that they take on the semblance of real people". However, he deemed the plot derivative of other films in the genre. Bill Cosford of the Miami Herald gave it a scathing review, criticizing the plot for being "incomprehensible." Cosford wrote that its title and "attractive star" are the only things working for the film.

==== Modern assessment ====
AllMovie gave the film a mixed review, writing, "Happy Birthday to Me stands out from the slasher movie pack of the early '80s because it pushes all the genre's elements to absurd heights. The murders, plot twists and, especially, the last-minute revelations that are dished up in the final reel don't just deny credibility, they outright defy it.”

Critic John Kenneth Muir called it "a fine slasher film."

In a 2022 retrospective assessment for Bloody Disgusting, Paul Lê described the film as "one of the strangest and best 80s slashers to come out of the decade." The same year, Tyler Doupe of Dread Central assessed the film as a "giallo masquerading as a slasher," noting its use of various plot twists, red herrings, and violent murders, which are common tropes in giallo films.

As of June 2023, Happy Birthday to Me holds a 29% rating on the review aggregator Rotten Tomatoes based on 14 reviews. On review aggregator Metacritic, the film has a weighted average score of 24 out of 100 based on 5 critics, indicating "generally unfavorable" reviews.

== Sources ==
- Harper, Jim (2004). Legacy of Blood: A Comprehensive Guide to Slasher Movies. Manchester, England: Critical Vision. ISBN 978-1-900-48639-2.
- Kerswell, J. A. (2018). The Teenage Slasher Movie Book, 2nd Revised and Expanded Edition. Mount Joy, Pennsylvania: Fox Chapel Publishing. ISBN 978-1-620-08308-6.
- Muir, John Kenneth (2010). Horror Films of the 1980s. Jefferson, North Carolina: McFarland & Company. ISBN 978-0-786-45501-0.
- Pitts, Michael R. (2014). Columbia Pictures Horror, Science Fiction and Fantasy Films, 1928-1982. Jefferson, North Carolina: McFarland. ISBN 978-0-786-45766-3.
