= Paul Kelman =

Canadian actor (1949–2022)

- Born: September 26, 1949; London, England
- Died: January 31, 2022 (aged 72); Toronto, Ontario, Canada
- Occupation: Actor
- Years active: 1971–1993

Paul Kelman (September 26, 1949 – January 31, 2022) was an English–Canadian actor. Born in London and raised in Ottawa, Kelman made his film debut in I'm Going to Get You, Elliott Boy (1971) before his most notable role as the lead in the slasher film My Bloody Valentine (1981).

In the 1980s, Kelman also had supporting roles in the comedy film Gas (1981) and the horror film Black Roses (1988). His final on-screen appearance was a guest role on an episode of the Fox television series Class of '96 (1993).

== Early life ==
Kelman was born in London, England on September 26, 1949. In 1955, he and his family moved to Ottawa, Canada.

== Career ==
Kelman's most famous on-screen role was as T.J. in the Canadian slasher film My Bloody Valentine (1981). In 2020 he took part in an interview for the release of the Collector's Edition version of the film.

== Personal life ==
In October 2021 Kelman was hospitalized with pneumonia. He died on January 31, 2022, due to health complications.

== Filmography ==
=== Film ===
Year	Title	Role	Notes
1971	I'm Going to Get You, Elliott Boy	Andre	Film debut
1981	My Bloody Valentine	T.J.	
1981	Gas	Nino Vespucci	
1988	Black Roses	Julie's Step-Dad	Final film role

=== Television ===
Year	Title	Role	Notes
1974	Police Surgeon	J.D. Cody	Episode: "Time Bomb"
1980; 1982	The Littlest Hobo	Tony	2 episodes
1984	For the Record		Episode: "Slim Obsession"
1991	Street Legal	Production Manager	Episode: "The Prosecution"
1993	Class of '96	Tololyan	Episode: "Educating David"; final on-screen appearance
