= List of 2009 box office number-one films in Ecuador =

This is a list of films which have placed number one at the weekend box office in Ecuador during 2009.

== Number-one films ==
†	This implies the highest-grossing movie of the year.

#	Date	Film	Gross	Notes
1	March 22, 2009	Underworld: Rise of the Lycans	$369,590	
2	March 29, 2009	Race to Witch Mountain	$301,373	
3	April 5, 2009	Monsters vs. Aliens	$400,075	
4	April 12, 2009	Dragonball Evolution	$527,744	
5	April 19, 2009	Dragonball Evolution	$281,937	
6	April 26, 2009	Paul Blart: Mall Cop	$307,627	
7	May 3, 2009	X-Men Origins: Wolverine	$591,296	
8	May 10, 2009	Hannah Montana: The Movie	$438,902	
9	May 17, 2009	Angels & Demons	$382,080	
10	May 24, 2009	Night at the Museum: Battle of the Smithsonian	$428,054	
11	May 31, 2009	Night at the Museum: Battle of the Smithsonian	$405,256	
12	June 7, 2009	Terminator Salvation	$341,116	
13	June 14, 2009	Up	$548,865	
14	June 21, 2009	Up	$387,669	
15	June 28, 2009	Transformers: Revenge of the Fallen	$566,790	
16	July 5, 2009	Ice Age: Dawn of the Dinosaurs	$812,322	
17	July 12, 2009	Ice Age: Dawn of the Dinosaurs	$675,575	
18	July 19, 2009	Harry Potter and the Half-Blood Prince	$665,407	
19	July 26, 2009	Ice Age: Dawn of the Dinosaurs	$450,597	
20	August 2, 2009	G-Force	$535,750	
21	August 9, 2009	G-Force	$494,514	
22	August 16, 2009	G-Force	$269,851	
23	August 23, 2009	G-Force	$344,377	
24	August 30, 2009	G-Force	$254,301	
25	September 6, 2009	My Bloody Valentine 3D	$326,942	
26	September 13, 2009	Aliens in the Attic	$300,970	
27	September 20, 2009	Cloudy with a Chance of Meatballs	$312,618	
28	September 27, 2009	Cloudy with a Chance of Meatballs	$304,955	
29	October 4, 2009	Cloudy with a Chance of Meatballs	$300,251	
30	October 11, 2009	Cloudy with a Chance of Meatballs	$359,663	
31	October 18, 2009	The Final Destination	$377,892	
32	October 25, 2009	District 9	$71,847	
33	November 1, 2009	Michael Jackson's This Is It	$404,761	
34	November 8, 2009	A Christmas Carol	$558,476	
35	November 15, 2009	2012	$665,336	
36	November 22, 2009	2012	$549,678	
37	November 29, 2009	The Twilight Saga: New Moon	$658,772	
38	December 6, 2009	The Twilight Saga: New Moon	$450,137	
39	December 13, 2009	The Twilight Saga: New Moon	$299,405	
40	December 20, 2009	Avatar †	$458,878	
41	December 27, 2009	Avatar †	$818,650	
