= Art Thief Musical! =

- Directed by: Linus Lau
- Starring: Autumn Reeser; Benjamin Sprunger; Matt O'Toole; Sean Smith
- Edited by: Peter Samet
- Music by: Andrew Kaiser
- Release date: September 2, 2004
- Running time: 20 minutes
- Country: United States
- Language: English
- Budget: $17,000 (estimated)

Art Thief Musical! is a 2004 American short musical film directed by Linus Lau. It stars Autumn Reeser, Benjamin Sprunger, Matt O'Toole and Sean Smith. It premiered at the Palm Springs International Festival of Short Films in September 2004. Inspired by Jacques Demy's The Umbrellas of Cherbourg, all of the "dialogue" throughout the entire film is sung, except for the last two lines.

== Cast ==
- Autumn Reeser - Clarity
- Benjamin Sprunger - Salvation
- Matt O'Toole - Drougray
- Sean Smith - Aftershave
- Vanessa VanHartesveldt - Chiquie
- Stephanie Denise Griffin - Hottie
- Jim Blanchette - 1st Detective
- Anthony Pellegrino - Femur
- Meghan McCormick - Baby
- Andréa Supnet - Sexpot
- Jeff Pickett - 2nd Detective
- Jack Wallace - Police Chief
- Richard John Walters - Lieutenant
