= Richard John Walters =

American film and television actor

Richard John Walters (born November 15, 1961) is an American film and television actor, best known for playing Harry Warden in the 2009 horror film, My Bloody Valentine 3D.

== Biography ==
Walters was born in Pittsburgh, Pennsylvania. Walters attended the West Virginia University and Duquesne University School of Law earning the Juris Doctor degree. He is licensed to practice law in Pennsylvania. Walters enjoys playing the guitar, ballroom dancing, wrestling, rugby, crew, skiing, and swimming.

== Filmography ==
Film
Year	Film	Role	Notes
2013	Pro Wrestlers vs Zombies	Tezcatlipoca	
2009	My Bloody Valentine 3D	Harry Warden	Credited as Rich Walters
2008	Smart People	Parking Lot Attendant	
2005	The Island	Agnate	uncredited
2005	Cleats of Imminent Doom	Abby's Dad	television
2005	Guilty or Innocent	Captain Bud Bailey	TV series 1 episode: The John Maloney Case
2004	Art Thief Musical!	Lieutenant	
2003	Malibooty!	Sergeant Atkins	
2003	Neverland	Bill Jukes	
Television
Year	Title	Role	Notes
2005	Guilty or Innocent	Captain Bud Bailey	TV series 1 episode: The John Maloney Case
2002	Boston Public	Tango Dancer	TV series 1 episode: Chapter Fifty-Two
