= Brian Hildebrand =

American professional wrestler, referee

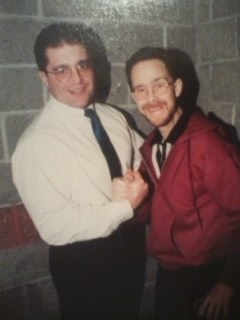
- Hildebrand (right) with Cody Michaels

Personal information
- Born: Brian Curtis Hildebrand; January 21, 1962 Pittsburgh, Pennsylvania, U.S.
- Died: September 8, 1999 (aged 37) Talbott, Tennessee, U.S.

Professional wrestling career
- Ring name(s): Mark Curtis; Kowabunga; Brian Hildebrand; Hymie P. Weiss
- Billed height: 5 ft 6 in (1.68 m)
- Billed weight: 145 lb (66 kg)
- Trained by: Dominic DeNucci; Tommy Young
- Debut: 1984
- Retired: 1998

Brian Curtis Hildebrand (January 21, 1962 – September 8, 1999) was an American professional wrestling manager, wrestler and referee who sometimes went by the name of Mark Curtis. Although trained in brawling, technical, and high-flying wrestling techniques, he spent most of his career as a manager and referee.

== Career ==
Hildebrand started out as a manager in 1984 in the independent territories in the northeastern United States at the age of 22. He was a heel manager, and he managed Cactus Jack at one time as an evil Jewish character named Hymie P. Weiss. In 1986, he began training at Dominic DeNucci's wrestling school in Freedom, Pennsylvania.

He went on to Smoky Mountain Wrestling (SMW) in 1992, where he was a referee under the ring name Mark Curtis and also wrestled occasionally as Kowabunga, fully costumed like a Ninja Turtle. Throughout his tenure in SMW as a referee, Hildebrand was known for wearing suspenders with his outfit. He also had brief heel work where he was allied with Jim Cornette, and made appearances in USWA along with Cornette. When SMW closed in 1995, he went on to work as a referee in Extreme Championship Wrestling, under his real name. After leaving ECW he went on to work as referee Mark Curtis in World Championship Wrestling.

== Death and memorials ==
Hildebrand was diagnosed with stomach and bowel cancer in October 1997. After having surgery in attempt to remove it, he continued refereeing for WCW throughout the following months. During the final stage of his disease in 1999, a Curtis Goes Home benefit was held in his hometown of Rostraver Township, Pennsylvania. Cody Michaels developed and promoted the event, which is viewed by wrestling insiders and experts as one of the truly memorable events in history that actually brought together the major companies at the time, World Wrestling Federation, World Championship Wrestling, and Extreme Championship Wrestling, in support for one of the most genuinely loved workers in the sport. The major stars that wrestled and provided support that night included Mick Foley, Dean Malenko, Eddie Guerrero, Chris Benoit, Chris Jericho, Shark Boy, Shane Douglas, Bruno Sammartino, Dominic DeNucci, Terry Taylor, D'Lo Brown, Al Snow, Hugh Morrus, Les Thatcher, Billy Kidman, Chris Candido, and many others.

Hildebrand died from the disease on September 8, 1999, at the age of 37. He refereed one last match at a local independent show mere days before his death. Hildebrand's death was briefly acknowledged on the following edition of WCW Thunder, but the first WCW event to have taken place after his death was a house show on September 11 at the Baltimore Arena, which was held in his honor with a ten bell salute. Late in the show, friends Shane Douglas, Chris Benoit, and Dean Malenko (known as Revolution) shared heartfelt words about Hildebrand and dedicated the show to him.

Southern States Wrestling held the Mark Curtis Memorial Weekend of Champions, an annual fundraiser for the Children's Miracle Network, from 2000 to 2003. Hildebrand also inspired the Mark Curtis Fantasy Camp 2001, a training event with Hugh Morrus on hand. A Mark Curtis Memorial Show would also be held on May 7, 2005, at Freedom Hall Civic Center in Johnson City, Tennessee. The main event pitted Al Snow and D'Lo Brown against Shane Douglas and Mick Foley.

It was announced on Sunday, February 25, 2018, that Michaels, Brian Hildebrand and Angie Minelli made up the Class of 2018 Keystone State Wrestling Alliance (KSWA) Hall of Fame. The ceremony took place on Saturday, March 24, 2018, in Pittsburgh.

== See also ==
- List of premature professional wrestling deaths
