= Linus Lau =

American film director

Linus Lau is a film composer, keyboardist and filmmaker based in Los Angeles, California. He studied film at USC. In 2000, he penned the music to a one-act opera titled The Release, with writer Daniel G. Lee. The opera was picked up for distribution by The Franchesa Group. A composer of art song, he has collaborated with a variety of notable poets, including Robert Creeley, Carol Ann Duffy, Billy Collins, Peter Cole, and Kenneth Koch. In 2009, he was the touring keyboardist for the alternative rock band Killola.

In 2004, he directed a musical film titled Art Thief Musical! starring Autumn Reeser. He is a film/music instructor at several schools in the Los Angeles area, including Musicians Institute and Long Beach City College.
