= Pro Wrestlers vs Zombies =

- Directed by: Cody Knotts
- Written by: Cody Knotts
- Starring: Roddy Piper; Matt Hardy; Kurt Angle; Shane Douglas; Jim Duggan; Reby Sky; Taya Parker; Matthew Rush; Adrienne Fischer; Ashton Amherst
- Cinematography: Joseph Russio
- Music by: Marco Werba
- Production company: Principalities of Darkness
- Distributed by: Troma Entertainment
- Release date: October 2013
- Country: United States
- Language: English

Pro Wrestlers vs Zombies (also known as Cody Knotts' Pro Wrestlers vs Zombies) is a 2013 sports action horror film that was directed by Cody Knotts. An early version of the film was shown at an international horror festival in Whitby, England in October 2013, and the movie was released to DVD on March 28, 2014 along with a limited theatrical release. The movie was funded partly through a successful Kickstarter campaign and through private funds from three investors and stars including several former WWE and current TNA wrestlers that portray themselves fighting against a horde of zombies.

== Synopsis ==
Pro wrestler "The Franchise" Shane Douglas catches his girlfriend Taya Parker cheating on him with his friend Brutaliser Billy in the locker room of an independent wrestling show. Later that night as Shane and Billy are wrestling in the ring, Shane performs a piledriver that results in Billy's death. Billy's brother Angus swears revenge and summons an ancient demon which gives him the power to create a horde of zombies in exchange for eating the heart of a female victim, a nurse whom Angus kidnaps from a hospital.

Six weeks after the events, Shane is offered a huge amount of money for an appearance at a wrestling show taking place in an abandoned prison. Shane agrees to make the show and travels to the prison along with old friend "Rowdy" Roddy Piper who travels with his girlfriend Sarah, "Hacksaw" Jim Duggan, Matt Hardy and his girlfriend Reby Sky. Shane learns to his distress that Taya will also be at the event. Meanwhile Angus has lured numerous pro wrestlers, including Kurt Angle, to the prison and has turned them into zombies. The zombies have retained their wrestling abilities and when the wrestlers arrive at the prison they are ambushed by the zombies and trapped in a wrestling ring until Angus commands his horde to kill Shane and his friends.

Shane, Piper and Duggan unite with Taya, indy wrestler Facade and pornographic actor turned wrestler Matthew Rush and take cover in a locker room. Shane explains to Piper what happened to Billy but Piper assures him that Billy's accident was due to inexperience and the fact that he did not tuck his head in order to protect himself from the piledriver. The group find a way out of the locker room but Rush is overpowered and killed by the zombies. Matt is separated from the group and after a brawl with a zombie in one of the prison cells is overpowered and disemboweled by the zombies. He crawls back to the group but quickly turns into a zombie and bites Reby as the wrestlers flee.

Shane betrays Duggan by shutting a door behind him and leaving him to be eaten by the zombies and later betrays Facade by locking himself inside a prison cell and refusing to let him in, stating "Jobbers die. Main eventers live". Soon after he reunites with Taya and confesses to her that he meant to kill Billy and that he does not care what happens to the group or to her since her adultery is what caused the whole mess. It leads to Taya abandoning Shane and running off to fend for herself, but she is killed by the zombies while trying to escape.

Piper and Sarah reunite and find a way out of the prison while Angus confronts Shane, who tells him that he's glad he killed Billy and that he'd do it again. Angus commands his horde to kill Shane but he fights them off and manages to flee. Piper and Sarah see the zombie horde leaving the prison and realize that if they get to the city then it could lead to a full blown outbreak. They decide to stay and fight, managing to handle the zombies while Angus asks for and receives more power from the ancient demon. Shane escapes the prison soon after and Piper confesses that he knows that Shane killed Billy on purpose, heartbroken that his friend would do something so careless. Angus summons another group of zombies who turn out to be Shane's family, including his brother Troy, his nephew Nicky and his mother. Shane pleads with Angus to turn them back but when he is refused he tearfully makes the decision to kill his family members to spare them a fate worse than death. With Shane emotionally broken, Angus calls upon more zombies and Shane is finally overpowered and killed.

Piper and Sarah notice that every time the zombie of the nurse Angus originally turned is hit, the other zombies seem to suffer damage as well. They realize that she is the original zombie and kill her which breaks the spell and causes the other zombies to die once and for all. With his army of the undead defeated, Angus tries for one last kill shot at Piper but is overpowered and killed. Piper and Sarah embrace and rejoice at having survived their ordeal.

== Cast ==
- Roddy Piper as himself
- Shane Douglas as himself
- Kurt Angle as himself
- Matt Hardy as himself
- Jim Duggan as himself
- Taya Parker as herself
- Reby Sky as herself
- Adrienne Fischer as Sarah
- Richard John Walters as Tezcatlipoca
- Shannon M. Hart as Serena
- Ashton Amherst as Angus
- Camera Bartolotta as Amber
- Cody Michaels as Troy
- Sylvester Terkay as himself
- Cody Knotts as himself
- Michael Cichowicz as Facade

== Production ==
Filming for Pro Wrestlers vs Zombies took place in Parkersburg, West Virginia during 2013, and Knotts raised part of the funding for the film via a successful Kickstarter campaign. Kurt Angle was brought in to perform in the movie after he was approached by one of the film's producers. Angle's role required a scene where he appears as a zombie, and he stated that the makeup process took about five hours and that he greatly enjoyed the experience. He further commented that as most of the zombies were also professional wrestlers, he felt more comfortable performing various wrestling moves as they would be experienced with the various techniques employed in the ring and in practice. The movie experienced some difficulties with filming when one of the performers was accidentally hit with a cooking pot by Roddy Piper, but did not otherwise have any major setbacks.

== Reception ==
Bleacher Report gave the film a positive review stating "It isn't trying to be smart or groundbreaking, just a lot of big, silly, violent fun" but noted that the movie would appeal most to wrestling fans. However, Fangoria panned the film overall as they felt that "Instead of capitalizing on the concept and going full-force, PRO WRESTLERS VS. ZOMBIES stretches its novelty to the breaking point by sitting on a repetitive story structure."
