= Curtis Comes Home =

- Promotion: Freelance
- Date: July 30, 1999
- City: Rostraver, Pennsylvania
- Venue: Ice Garden
- Attendance: 1,500

Event chronology
← Previous; N/A	Next → Mark Curtis Memorial Reunion

Curtis Comes Home (alternately Curtis Goes Home) was a professional wrestling memorial show produced by Cody Michaels, which took place on July 30, 1999 at the Rostraver Ice Garden in Rostraver, Pennsylvania. Proceeds from the event went to raise money for wrestling referee Mark Curtis, then suffering from stomach cancer, to pay part of his medical expenses.

== Production ==
Curtis Comes Home was one of the largest independent supercards ever held in the United States according to Jim Cornette, a longtime friend of Curtis, who was also among the show's participants. The event included talent from Extreme Championship Wrestling, World Championship Wrestling, and the World Wrestling Federation, as well as notable stars from the independent circuit. Legendary wrestlers Bruno Sammartino, Les Thatcher, and Sandy Scott also made special appearances. All the participants performed for free, and both WCW and the WWF paid the transportation costs for its wrestlers to attend the show. In addition to being held in Curtis' hometown, the Rostraver Ice Garden was a regular venue for ECW shows held in the Pittsburgh metropolitan area. The event had an attendance of 1,500 and was successful in raising $30,000.

== Event ==
Nine professional wrestling matches were featured on the card. The main event was a six-man tag team match featuring The Triple Threat (Chris Benoit, Dean Malenko and Shane Douglas) facing off against Chris Candido, Tim Horner, and Tracy Smothers (with Tammy Sytch). This was the first time the original incarnation of The Triple Threat had teamed together since 1995 and pitted Douglas against another ex-member of the heel stable, Candido, who was aligned with fellow Smokey Mountain Wrestling alumni. In the semi-main event, Chris Jericho wrestled Terry Taylor just a few days prior to Jericho's official WWF debut on Raw Is War.

There were several featured matches on the undercard. The first was a singles match between Cody Michaels, accompanied by manager Jim Cornette, and Hugh Morrus, which Michaels won. D'Lo Brown, then WWF European and Intercontinental Champion, was scheduled to wrestle Al Snow in a non-title no-disqualification match; however, special guest referee Mankind eventually became involved in the bout, turning it into an impromptu Triple threat match. Mankind ended up winning the match via pinfall when he used his "Mandible claw" finisher on both his opponents and Mark Curtis, then weighing only 75 pounds, unexpectedly entered the ring to make the three count.

Eddy Guerrero won a Three-Way Dance against Billy Kidman and then-reigning HWA Cruiserweight Champion Shark Boy in a non-title match. Shark Boy was originally billed to defend the championship title he had won at the 1999 Brian Pillman Memorial Cruiserweight Tournament against a mystery opponent. Also on the show, Dominic DeNucci defeated Lord Zoltan in a Legends match. DeNucci had the distinction of training several wrestlers on the card including Mark Curtis, Mankind, Shane Douglas, and Cody Michaels.

== Aftermath ==
Mark Curtis' last match as referee was for the East Tennessee promotion, just a few days before his death on September 8, 1999. Southern States Wrestling held a memorial show honoring Curtis from 2000 to 2003, the Mark Curtis Memorial Weekend of Champions, as a fundraiser for the Children's Miracle Network. The Mark Curtis Memorial Reunion, promoted by Curtis' widow Pam Hildebrand-Clark, was also held for the organization in 2005.

== Results ==
No.	Results	Stipulations
1	Julio Sanchez defeated Frank Parker	Singles match
2	Dominic DeNucci defeated Lord Zoltan	Legends match
3	Big Dick Flanagan defeated Sheriff Steele	Singles match
4	Eddy Guerrero defeated Billy Kidman and Shark Boy	Three-way dance
5	The Public Enemy (Johnny Grunge and Rocco Rock) defeated Beau James and Roger Anderson	Tag Team match
6	Cody Michaels (with Jim Cornette) defeated Hugh Morrus	Singles match
7	Mankind defeated Al Snow and D'Lo Brown	Triple threat match
8	Chris Jericho defeated Terry Taylor	Singles match
9	The Triple Threat (Chris Benoit, Dean Malenko and Shane Douglas) defeated Chris Candido, Tim Horner and Tracy Smothers (with Tammy Sytch)	Six-man tag team match
