= My Bloody Valentine 3D =

2009 American film by Patrick Lussier

- Theatrical release poster
- Directed by: Patrick Lussier
- Screenplay by: Todd Farmer; Zane Smith
- Based on: My Bloody Valentine by: John Beaird; Stephen Miller
- Produced by: Jack Murray
- Starring: Jensen Ackles; Jaime King; Kerr Smith; Kevin Tighe
- Cinematography: Brian Pearson
- Edited by: Patrick Lussier; Cynthia Ludwig
- Music by: Michael Wandmacher
- Production company: Lionsgate Films
- Distributed by: Lionsgate Films
- Release date: January 16, 2009
- Running time: 101 minutes
- Country: United States
- Language: English
- Budget: $15 million
- Box office: $100.7 million

My Bloody Valentine 3D (Note: Simply known as My Bloody Valentine in 2D formats.) is a 2009 American 3D slasher film directed and co-edited by Patrick Lussier, and written by Todd Farmer and Zane Smith. A remake of the 1981 Canadian film, it stars Jensen Ackles, Jaime King, Kerr Smith and Kevin Tighe. The film focuses on the residents of a small town that is plagued by a serial killer in mining gear on Valentine's Day, who is believed to be the same murderer who was thought to have died a decade prior.

After filming on location in Pennsylvania, the film was given a 3D theatrical release. It was the first R-rated film to be projected in RealD technology and to have a wide release (1,000 locations) in 3D-enabled theaters.

My Bloody Valentine 3D was released in the United States on January 16, 2009, by Lionsgate Films. The film received generally mixed reviews from critics and grossed $100.7 million worldwide on a budget of $14 million.

== Plot ==
On Valentine's Day 1997, six miners are trapped underground by an explosion at the Hanniger mine in the small mining community of Harmony. By the time rescuers reach the miners, they find only comatose Harry Warden still alive. Further investigation reveals that Warden killed the other miners to conserve oxygen. Tom Hanniger, son of the mine's owner, is blamed for the explosion as he forgot to vent the methane lines that caused the collapse.

One year later, Warden has awakened from his coma and is now murdering as an act of revenge. He starts by killing numerous patients and staff at the hospital where he was a patient, leaving a victim's heart in a box of chocolates. While Tom, his girlfriend Sarah, their friends Irene and Axel, and other teenagers party inside the mine, Warden – wearing mining gear and a gas mask – attacks them with a pickaxe. Sarah, Irene, and Axel escape but Tom is left behind with Warden. Sheriff Burke arrives and shoots Warden before he can kill the severely traumatized Tom, but Warden staggers away deeper into the mine.

Ten years later, Tom returns to Harmony after his father dies. He is selling the mine, which angers mine manager Ben Foley. Axel, now the town's sheriff, has married Sarah but is having an affair with her coworker Megan. At the motel where Tom is staying, a masked assailant murders Irene and two other people. Camera footage from the scene reveals the killer dressed as a miner, starting rumors that Warden has returned. Axel receives a chocolate box containing Irene's heart. Meanwhile, Tom reconnects with Sarah and apologizes for his ten-year absence.

Looking for Ben in the mine, Tom is locked inside a utility cage by the Miner, who murders Red, the worker accompanying Tom and vanishes before help arrives. Tom insists that Warden has returned, but Axel reveals that Ben and Burke found and killed Warden after his attack ten years ago. The group visits the woods where Warden's body was buried, but find that the grave is empty. Tom resolves to track down and stop Warden. Searching the woods, he finds the shack that Axel and Megan have been using for their affair. That night, the Miner kills Ben and leaves his body in Warden's grave. Axel realizes the killer must be one of the few people aware of the grave, and he becomes suspicious of Tom and Burke.

The Miner attacks Sarah and Megan at their store, killing Megan just before Axel arrives. Sarah is hospitalized with minor wounds. The Miner then kills Burke as well as the maid of Axel and Sarah's home. Tom shows up at the hospital, telling Sarah he has to show her something he found in Axel's cabin. She checks herself out and accompanies Tom. As they drive, Tom suggests that Axel is the killer. Axel calls and urges Sarah to get away from Tom, whom he says is the killer; Axel has discovered that Tom spent the last seven years in a mental institution. Tom becomes increasingly agitated and Sarah, believing Axel, grabs the wheel and crashes the car before escaping into the woods.

Sarah hides in Axel's cabin. There she discovers evidence of Axel's affair and a tower of empty valentine gift boxes. The Miner appears and chases her into the mine. She is hiding in the mine when Axel arrives, and Sarah grabs his gun. Tom shows up, and Sarah holds the two men at gunpoint as they each accuse the other of being the killer. Tom, however, mentions the way Megan was killed, inadvertently revealing he is the killer. As Sarah points the gun at him, Tom hallucinates, revealing the Miner is his split personality. A flashback shows him digging up Warden's mining gear and committing the murders. After a struggle, Sarah shoots Tom, and the bullet strikes a fuel tank, which explodes. Sarah and Axel are rescued from the resulting cave-in. Tom also survives, murdering the rescue worker who finds him and escaping in the worker's gear.

== Cast ==
- Jensen Ackles as Tom Hanniger
- Jaime King as Sarah Mercer-Palmer
- Kerr Smith as Sheriff Axel Palmer
- Betsy Rue as Irene
- Megan Boone as Megan
- Edi Gathegi as Deputy Martin
- Tom Atkins as Sheriff Jim Burke
- Kevin Tighe as Ben Foley
- Karen Baum as Deputy Ferris
- Joy de la Paz as Rosa
- Marc Macaulay as Marc Riggs
- Selene Luna as Selene
- Todd Farmer as Frank, The Trucker
- Jeff Hochendoner as William "Red" Kirkpatrick
- Bingo O'Malley as Officer Hinch
- Richard John Walters as Harry Warden / The Miner
  - Chris Carnel as The Miner

== Production ==
The film was shot in Southwestern Pennsylvania, taking advantage of the state's tax incentives for film productions as well as the topographical and architectural versatility of the Pittsburgh Metro area. Filming began on May 11, 2008, in Armstrong County along the Route 28 corridor, in locations including Sprankle's Market in Kittanning, the Ford City police station, and the exterior of the Logansport Mine in Bethel. Kittanning served as the main street in the film's fictional town of Harmony. The production spent 13 days filming scenes in the Tour-Ed Mines in the Pittsburgh suburb of Tarentum, a mine that has been out of production since the 1960s and now operates as a museum. The inside of Valliant's Diner in Ross Township was used as a location for one scene, and a house on Hulton Road in Oakmont, a suburb of Pittsburgh, was also used as a location. The scenes at the Thunderbird motel were shot at the Fort Pitt Motel in Oakdale, PA.

The film was shot entirely digitally in 4K resolution. The filmmakers used the Red One from Red Digital Cinema Camera Company, and the SI-2K Digital Cinema Camera by Silicon Imaging as digital cameras. Max Penner, the film's stereographer, found these lighter and smaller cameras easier to use. My Bloody Valentine was the first R-rated film to be projected in RealD technology and to have a wide release (1,000 locations) in 3D-enabled theaters. The film was also available in 2D for theaters that were not equipped to process digital 3D technology.

Special make-up effects were created by Gary J. Tunnicliffe.

== Release ==
On its 4-day opening weekend, the film grossed $24.1 million, ranking #3 for the weekend, behind Gran Torino at #2, and Paul Blart: Mall Cop at #1. In its second weekend, the movie grossed estimated $10.1 million, ranking number 6 at the domestic box office. The film grossed $51 million in the United States and Canada, and $49 million in other markets for a worldwide total of $100.7 million worldwide.

=== Critical response ===
Screen Rant reported that the reviews of My Bloody Valentine 3D were positive, with praise "for being a fun, hyper-violent throwback slasher movie with the campy gimmick of being projected in 3D." Review aggregator website Rotten Tomatoes reports that 63% of 108 critics gave the film a positive review, with the consensus reading: "This gory, senses-assaulting slasher film is an unpretentious, effective mix of old-school horror stylings and modern 3D technology". On Metacritic, which assigns a weighted average score out of 100 to reviews from mainstream critics, the film received an average score of 51 based on 11 reviews, indicating "mixed or average reviews". Audiences polled by CinemaScore gave the film an average grade of "C+" on an A+ to F scale.

Joe Leydon of Variety said "director and co-editor [Patrick] Lussier (a frequent Wes Craven collaborator) plays the 3-D gimmick for all it's worth: Everything from tree branches and gun barrels to bloody pickaxes and bloodier body parts appears to jump off the screen. He also makes effective use of the depth-of-field illusion, allowing audiences long views of various chest cavities from which hearts have been rudely ripped. At the very least, the overall tech package is a great deal more impactful than that of the 3-D-lensed Friday the 13th Part III (1982)". He added, in spite of the "state-of-the-art 3-D camera trickery, which helmer Patrick Lussier shamelessly exploits to goose the audience with cheap thrills and full-bore gore, My Bloody Valentine is at heart an unabashedly retro work, reveling in the cliches and conventions of the slasher horror pics that proliferated in the early 1980s".

Mark Olsen of the Los Angeles Times said, the implemented 3-D technology enables "startling effects, but after a while the minor thrill of the trick is gone. Advances in digital technology have allowed the filmmakers to largely avoid the physical headaches that are perhaps the biggest hallmark of the cyclical attempts at 3-D moviemaking". He added, "wooden performances by forgettable, generic actors -- again, just like in the original -- don't aid in making things any less leaden", concluding My Bloody Valentine 3D is "just good enough to not be annoying".

Jeannette Catsoulis of The New York Times said, "the creaky screenplay (by Todd Farmer and Zane Smith) is mercilessly at odds with the director's fine sense of pacing. From the moment you duck a flying mandible and gaze, mesmerized, at a severed hand oozing two inches from your nose, you'll be convinced that the extra dimension was worth seeking out. A strange synergy of old and new, My Bloody Valentine 3D blends cutting-edge technology and old-school prosthetics to produce something both familiar and alien: gore you can believe in".

Clark Collis of Entertainment Weekly graded the film a C+ and said that it "starts in spectacular fashion. But what really leaps out at you about My Bloody Valentine 3-D is its lack of imagination". Frank Scheck of The Hollywood Reporter felt: "While the concept of adding 3-D to the horror genre is hardly new ... Patrick Lussier's film is the most accomplished example. The 3-D effects come fast and furious, rendered with a technical skill and humor that gives this otherwise strictly formulaic slasher picture whatever entertainment value it possesses". He added that "the three leads actually manage to invest their roles with some depth, but the real acting treats come courtesy of veteran character actors Kevin Tighe and [Tom] Atkins, whose presence provides a comforting bridge to horror films past".

=== Home media ===
My Bloody Valentine 3D was released on DVD and Blu-ray on May 19, 2009, and has grossed in excess of $19.7 million, with DVD sales and theater gross revenue totaling over $119.9 million.

Both home release versions have both a standard 2D version and the 3D version on the same disc using seamless branching.

In October 2010, Lionsgate Home Entertainment released My Bloody Valentine 3D on Blu-ray 3D which requires a 3D-capable HDTV, 3D Blu-ray player and 3D glasses. The disc also includes a 2D version of the film and all bonus materials included in the 2D Blu-ray version released after the film's initial theater run.

== Cancelled sequel ==
In March 2020, in an interview with Bloody Disgusting, Farmer revealed that he and Lussier both pitched a script for a sequel to the remake to Lionsgate Studios executives John Sacchi and Michael Paseornek two weeks ahead of the film's release. After the film received mixed reviews from critics, Lionsgate lost interest. The sequel would have been more psychological and would have brought back survivors from the remake as well as expanded upon its backstory. Farmer's script had also planned to kill off Sarah (Jaime King).

== Related media ==
The 14th episode of the 5th season of Supernatural, which stars Jensen Ackles, was titled "My Bloody Valentine" and released in 2010, one year after My Bloody Valentine 3D. A 3D television film called My Bloodiest Valentine was also mentioned in the 3rd episode of the 7th season of the show, which released in 2011, possibly intended as a fictional sequel to the film.
