= Gas (1981 film) =

- Directed by: Les Rose
- Written by: Susan Scranton; Dick Wolf
- Produced by: Claude Héroux
- Starring: Susan Anspach; Howie Mandel; Sterling Hayden; Helen Shaver; Peter Aykroyd; Sandee Currie; Keith Knight; Donald Sutherland
- Cinematography: René Verzier
- Edited by: Patrick Dodd
- Music by: Paul Zaza
- Production companies: Filmplan International; Davis-Panzer Productions; Canadian Film Development Corporation
- Distributed by: Paramount Pictures
- Release date: July 24, 1981
- Running time: 94 minutes
- Country: Canada
- Language: English
- Budget: C$6,500,000
- Box office: $2,869,425 (US)

Gas is a 1981 Canadian comedy film released by Paramount Pictures, the plot of which was inspired by the 1979 energy crisis. The film was directed by Les Rose and produced by Claude Héroux.

== Plot summary ==
A small Midwestern town is thrown into chaos when the local oil tycoon Duke Stuyvesant orchestrates a phony oil shortage in order to increase profits. News reporter Jane Beardsley tries to uncover the plot. Radio DJ Nick the Noz, observing from his station's news helicopter, reports on the craziness caused by the gasoline shortage.

== Cast ==
- Susan Anspach as Jane Beardsley
- Howie Mandel as Matt Lloyd
- Sterling Hayden as Duke Stuyvesant
- Helen Shaver as Rhonda
- Sandee Currie as Sarah Marshal
- Peter Aykroyd as Ed Marshal
- Keith Knight as Ira
- Alf Humphreys as Lou Picard
- Philip Akin as Lincoln Jones
- Michael Hogan as Guido Vespucci
- Paul Kelman as Nino Vespucci
- Donald Sutherland as Nick "The Noz"
- Carl Marotte as Bobby
- Dustin Waln as Earl Stuyvesant
- Vlasta Vrána as Baron Stuyvesant
- Harvey Chao as Lee Kwan
- Walker Boone as "Dutch", Gangster #1

== Home media ==
The film was released on VHS and ßeta in January 1982 by Paramount Home Video. To date, it has not been released on DVD, Blu-ray or 4k/UHD.
