= Harry Warden =

The Miner
- My Bloody Valentine character
- The Miner in My Bloody Valentine (1981), portrayed by Peter Cowper
- First appearance: My Bloody Valentine
- Created by: Stephen Miller
- Portrayed by: Peter Cowper; Neil Affleck; Jeff Banks; Jensen Ackles; Chris Carnel; Richard John Walters

In-universe information
- Full name: Harry Warden; Axel Palmer; Tom Hanniger
- Classification: Mass murderer
- Signature weapon: Pick axe
- Location: Valentine Bluffs, Canada (original); Harmony, Pennsylvania (remake)

The Miner is a fictional identity adopted by several characters in the Valentine's Day themed horror films My Bloody Valentine (1981) and My Bloody Valentine 3D (2009). He was created by writer Stephen Miller and portrayed by Peter Cowper, Neil Affleck, and Jeff Banks in George Mihalka's original and Jensen Ackles, Chris Carnel, and Richard John Walters in Patrick Lussier's 3D remake.

In the lore of the films, the true identity of The Miner is often confused for Harry Warden, the sole survivor of a catastrophic mining accident at the Hanniger Mine, who is found to have murdered the rest of the miners trapped with him, either for food or oxygen. Harry awakens from a coma and goes on a rampage – subsequently becoming an urban legend of residents of the local mining town, in which he is believed to unleash a wrath upon those who partake in the forbidden Valentine's Day dance, with victims of his, Axel Palmer and Tom Hanniger, taking up the mantle themselves on descending into insanity and psychopathy. He is depicted as an antagonist in both films.

The character debuted in the early slasher boom and widely recognized for his distinctive gas mask and miner attire. The Miner has gained a cult status in the horror genre fandom despite only appearing in two films.

== Appearances ==
=== Films ===
In My Bloody Valentine (1981), Harry Warden was one of several miners trapped in a cave-in after his two supervisors neglected their work to attend the town's Valentine's Day dance. Warden was the only survivor and had to resort to killing and eating his coworkers to stay alive. Driven insane by these events, Warden hunted down and killed both of the supervisors as "The Miner", cutting out their hearts and putting them in Valentine candy boxes to spite the holiday along with notes to never hold the dance again or he will return and kill more people. He was eventually caught and institutionalized. Twenty years later, the town has forgotten the murders and decides to reinstate the dance. When police chief Jake Newby receives an anonymous box of Valentine chocolates containing a human heart and a note warning that murders will begin if the dance proceeds, he checks the mental institution where Harry Warden was incarcerated, but they have no record of him, and the Miner begins murdering people around town. It is later revealed that the new murders were actually done by the young miner Axel Palmer who witnessed his father (one of the supervisors) being murdered by Warden when he was a child and has been traumatized by the event ever since and assumed the mantle of the Miner himself, while it is also revealed Harry Warden had died from unknown causes five years before the events of the film.

In My Bloody Valentine 3D (2009), on Valentine's Day 1997, Warden and several other miners are trapped in a cave-in; Warden murders the other miners with a pickaxe to conserve air. Warden is rescued, albeit in a coma; he wakes up one year later, he murders several hospital staff and patients, before heading back to the mines. Warden breaks into a party held at the mines and kills multiple partygoers, only to be shot by Sheriff Burke when he attempts to murder Tom Hanniger, the last person still in the mine. Warden escapes from Burke and his posse by going deeper into the mines and using an escape hatch, but Burke and his posse discover him. In an act of vigilantism, they fatally shoot Warden and bury his body in the woods. Ten years later, murders begin again leading to speculation that the Miner is back. Though the Miner's gear and body disappear, it is eventually revealed Tom had become the new Miner after suffering a psychotic break and developing a split personality based on Warden.

== Merchandising ==
NECA, in collaboration with Scream Factory, has released an action figure of the Miner. This marks the Miner's first ever collectible.

== Development ==
=== Conception ===
The Miner is depicted as a once normal man who descended into madness when his bosses weren't paying attention to their workers, which led to the disaster and subsequently the Miner's insanity. He is depicted similarly to Michael Myers and Jason Voorhees in that he is a deranged silent killer who lurks in the shadows. In Canadian Cinema Since the 1980s: At the Heart of the World, Mihalka stated that the Miner "wasn't born evil; he was a hardworking man who went insane when the bosses neglected the people that worked for them, causing a disaster. I really insisted on the subtext. Okay, it's not exactly a treatise on Das Kapital, but at the same time, that's who the character is."

=== Design ===
Writer Alexandra Heller-Nicholas notes that the Miner's attire, the gas mask and mining gear, aren't exclusively worn by him throughout the film as it is set in a working-class town but that this adds to the enigma of the character's identity as multiple people are seen in the same equipment throughout the film. She describes the close-ups of the mask during the killings as to what makes the figure frightening. She asserts that this also pertains to the gas masks connection to modern warfare and environmental disasters.

== Reception ==
Film journalist J. A. Kerswell described Warden as iconic: "The mad Miner is one of the subgenre's best and most iconic villains: silent and menacing in his gas mask, carrying his pickax ready for mayhem." Writer Don Sumner called the Miner a "great villain". In Understanding Social Divisions, Shaun Best compared the Miner to Hannibal Lecter, Freddy Krueger, Michael Myers, Leatherface, Norman Bates, and Jason Voorhees, stating that they all "reinforce the stigma surrounding mental illness and present a powerful picture of people who suffer from mental illness as potential psycho-killers." Matt Molgaard of Horror Freak News praised the character, saying, "You know, it really doesn’t matter who sports the mask of the Miner: be it Harry Warden, Tom Hanniger, or Billy Crystal. It’s all about the sense of inescapable dread that sinks to the bottom of the stomach the moment that mask earns screen time. Of all the legendary masks horror freaks discuss on a regular basis (Myers, Voorhees, Ghostface, etc., etc.), this one is certainly one of the more frightening to behold. The odd thing is I can’t even fully explain why that is. Perhaps it is better that I don’t over-analyze things and just respect the Miner and his mask for what they are: kick ass, top notch additions to the genre! Don’t bypass the 2009 remake simply because you’re a purist: it’s awfully entertaining and sports one of the most awkward (therefore must-see) nude scenes I’ve seen in 31 years!"
