= Keith Knight (actor) =

Canadian film, television and voice actor (1956–2007)

- Born: January 20, 1956; Sault Ste. Marie, Ontario, Canada
- Died: August 22, 2007 (aged 51); Toronto, Ontario, Canada
- Occupation: Actor
- Years active: 1978–2007
- Spouse: Jenifer McCullough

Keith Knight (January 20, 1956 – August 22, 2007) was a Canadian film, television and voice actor. He made his screen debut as Larry "Fink" Finkelstein in the 1979 comedy Meatballs, voiced the White Rabbit in The Care Bears Adventure in Wonderland, and voiced Pigface in the BBC drama Ace Lightning. Knight was also known for voicing Lowly Worm in The Busy World of Richard Scarry. He was also the voice of Moldy Van Oldy in the first two seasons of the hit series Erky Perky.

== Early life ==
Knight was born in Sault Ste. Marie, Ontario to Edna (née Butterfield) and Ronald Knight, who served with the British Columbia Regiment from 1942 to 1945 during World War II before spending 30 years as a secondary school history and geography teacher in several municipalities throughout Ontario, primarily Sault Ste. Marie.

== Death ==
Knight died of brain cancer at his home in Toronto, Ontario on August 22, 2007. He was 51 years old.

== Filmography ==
=== Film ===
Year	Title	Role	Notes
1979	Meatballs	Larry "Fink" Finkelstein	
1980	Hog Wild	Vern Jones	
1981	My Bloody Valentine	Hollis	
1981	Gas	Ira	
1982	Class of 1984	"Barnyard"	
1983	Siege	Steve	
1983	Of Unknown Origin	Hardware Salesman	
1986	Whodunit?	Stanley	Video
1987	The Care Bears Adventure in Wonderland	The White Rabbit	Voice
1987	Mr. Nice Guy	Larry	
1990	Love & Murder	Marty	
1990	Whispers	Avril	
1998	Clutch	Buck	
2003	Owning Mahowny	Surveillance Operator	
2003	Bar Life	Gordon	Short
2005	Looking for Angelina	Uriah McFadden	

=== Television ===
Year	Title	Role	Notes
1980	The Littlest Hobo	Dog Catcher #1	Episode: "Diamonds Are a Dog's Best Friend"
1985	Letting Go	Business Man	TV movie
1985	The Canadian Conspiracy	Unknown	TV movie
1986	The Lawrenceville Stories	Baldwin	2 episodes
1986	Seeing Things	Scott	1 episode: "Optical Illusion"
1986–1987	Adderly	Unknown	3 episodes
1986	Check It Out!	Eddie	Episode: S1, E17, "Banzai!"
1987	American Playhouse	Mr. "Elder Brother" Baldwin	Episode: "The Prodigious Hickey"
1987	Check It Out!	Mickey	Episode: "The Son Also Rises"
1988	The Care Bears Family	Unknown	Voice, 27 episodes
1988	Katts and Dog	Unknown	1 episode: "What If I'm Not a Cop?"
1988	Family Reunion	The Bus Driver	
1989	Shining Time Station	Amazo	Episode: "The Magic Is Believing"
1989	Street Legal	Peter	Episode: "Conflict of Interest"
1989	The Twilight Zone	Archie	Episode: "Special Service"
1989	Starting from Scratch	Wendall Tark	Episode: "Me, the Jury"
1989–1991	Babar	Unknown	Voice, 39 episodes
1990	War of the Worlds	Bob	Episode: "Video Messiah"
1990	The Campbells	Turkey Seller	1 episode: "Comfort and Joy"
1990	Piggsburg Pigs!	Portly	11 episodes
1990–1991	Beetlejuice	Armhold Musclehugger	Voice, 18 episodes
1991	Rupert	Unknown	Voice, 13 episodes
1991–1992	The Adventures of Tintin	Unknown	Voice, 26 episodes
1992	The Rosey & Buddy Show	Unknown	Voice, TV movie
1992–1993	Road to Avonlea	Reverend Fitzsimmons	2 episodes
1993–1994	Tales from the Cryptkeeper	Unknown	Voice, 2 episodes
1994	The Adventures of Dudley the Dragon	Snowman	Episode: "Dudley and the Snowman"
1994	Monster Force	Unknown	Voice, 13 episodes
1994	RoboCop: The Series	Store Manager	Episode: "Robocop vs. Commander Cash"
1994–1996	The Busy World of Richard Scarry	Lowly Worm / Able Baker Charlie / Snozzle	Voice, 65 episodes
1995	Liberty Street	James Wilder	13 episodes
1995	The Neverending Story	Acharis	Episode: "The Tears of Sadness"
1996	Traders	Unknown	Episode: "A Soldier's Virtue"
1996	The Mystery Files of Shelby Woo	Nate Lately	Episode: "The Movie Star Mystery"
1996–1998	Blazing Dragons	Unknown	Voice
1998–1999	Dumb Bunnies	Professor Bunsen	2 episodes
1998–2000	Elliot Moose	Beaverton	Main role
1999	Redwall	Squire Julian Gingivere	12 episodes
1999	Switching Goals	Willard Holmes	TV movie
2000	Franklin	Marten	Episode: "Franklin and the Grump/Franklin's Promise"
2000	Redwall: The Movie	Squire Julian Gingivere	TV movie
2000–2002	Anne of Green Gables: The Animated Series	Willow 2	5 episodes
2001	Hippo Tub Co.	Harley	3 episodes
2001	Laughter on the 23rd Floor	Brutus	TV movie
2001–2002	Pecola	Al A. Gator	Voice, English version, 12 episodes
2002	Queer as Folk	Dr. Beamer	Episode: "The Wedding"
2002	Lucky Day	Unknown	TV movie
2002	Ace Lightning	Pigface	
2003	Street Time	Randall King	Episode: "Get Up, Stand Up"
2005	Sue Thomas: F.B.Eye	Doctor	Episode: "Secret Agent Man"
2005–2008	Miss Spider's Sunny Patch Friends	Frank	5 episodes
2006	This Is Wonderland	David Smith	Episode: "#3.10"
2006	An American Girl on the Home Front	Principal Stevens	TV movie
2006–2007	Erky Perky	Moldy Van Oldy	22 episodes; final role
