= Tony Lanza =

Canadian professional wrestler (1920–2005)

Personal information
- Born: Ferdinairdo Antonio Lanza; July 7, 1920 Montreal, Quebec, Canada
- Died: January 20, 2005 (aged 84)

Professional wrestling career
- Ring name(s): Tony Lanza; Lario Lanza; Felipe Manozian; Black Devil; The Strangler; Masked Strangler; Masked Spider; The Gorilla; King Kong, The Gorilla Man; Young Sandor
- Billed height: 6 ft 0 in (1.83 m)
- Billed weight: 250 lb (110 kg)
- Trained by: Emile Maupas
- Debut: 1950
- Retired: 1973

Ferdinairdo Antonio Lanza (July 7, 1920 – January 20, 2005) was a Canadian professional wrestler, photographer and actor who was best known to fans in Quebec and Canada as Tony Lanza. Sports journalist Greg Oliver called Lanza "probably Canada's greatest [pro] wrestling photographer".

== Professional wrestling career ==
A student of Emile Maupas, Lanza made his wrestling debut in 1950 in Montreal. He also worked in Toronto, Ottawa and the United States with various masked gimmicks. In 1961, he was one of several Montreal wrestling stars to be featured in Wrestling (French: La lutte), a National Film Board of Canada documentary. Lanza trained Dominic DeNucci. He also trained Yvon Robert Jr. in the late-1960s. He retired from wrestling in 1973.

== Personal life ==
Lanza died on January 20, 2005 at 84 from a fall in his bathroom.
