= Cody Michaels =

American professional wrestler

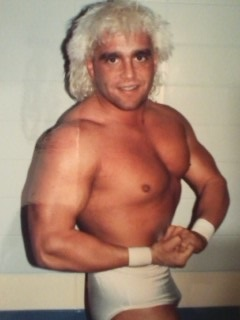
- Michaels in 1990

Personal information
- Born: Mark Keenan Pittsburgh, Pennsylvania, U.S.

Professional wrestling career
- Ring name: Cody Michaels
- Billed height: 5 ft 11 in (1.80 m)
- Billed weight: 242 lb (110 kg)
- Billed from: Pittsburgh, Pennsylvania
- Trained by: Dominic DeNucci
- Debut: 1986
- Retired: 1991

Mark Keenan, better known by his ring name Cody Michaels, is an American former professional wrestler. After suffering a serious neck injury, Michaels retired and has worked behind the scenes as a booker and promoter.

== Professional wrestling career ==
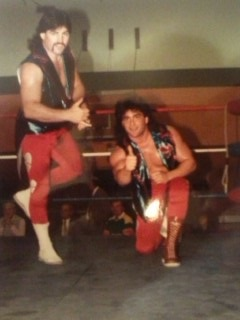
Michaels and Dick Flanagan (1987)

Keenan played college football prior to becoming a professional wrestler. He was trained by Dominic DeNucci in Pittsburgh, alongside friends Mick Foley, Brian Hildebrand, and former college roommate Shane Douglas.

Beginning in 1986, Michaels wrestled under the name Dante DeNucci because of his close bond to, and respect for his trainer Dominic DeNucci. He initially traveled the Northeastern and Midwestern independent wrestling territories as one half of the Heartbreakers Tag team with partner Dick Flanagan. Michaels wrestled for United States Wrestling Association (USWA), World Wrestling Federation (WWF), Extreme Championship Wrestling (ECW), National Wrestling Alliance (NWA), and American Wrestling Association (AWA). During his in-ring career, his tag team partners included Jeff Jarrett, Douglas, Foley, Jerry Lynn, Bill Dundee, and DeNucci himself. Michaels' opponents included Steve Austin, Eddie Gilbert, Foley, The Iron Sheik, The Fabulous Ones, and Douglas. Michaels' previous tag team, The Heartbreakers, was managed for a time in the late 1980's by "Captain" Lou Albano.

In March 1991 Michaels was seriously injured in a match against John Tatum at the Sportatorium in Dallas, Texas. He sustained a broken neck which eventually led to the end of his in-ring career.

== Subsequent career ==
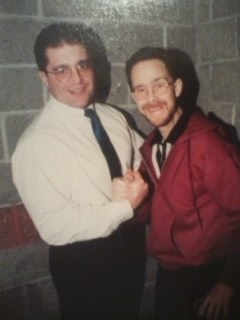
Michaels (left) and Brian Hildebrand

Michaels developed and promoted a benefit in 1999, Curtis Comes Home, for friend Brian Hildebrand, aka Mark Curtis (WCW referee), who was battling end stage stomach cancer at the time. It brought together the major wrestling companies in support for Hildebrand. He would also make a one-night return to the ring that night to be managed by Jim Cornette, against Hugh Morrus.

Michaels continued his involvement in professional wrestling as an associate producer, booker, writer, and creative team member in Wrestling Society X (WSX), Viacom/MTV's short-lived professional wrestling-based television series produced in 2006, and airing in 2006-2007, by Big Vision Entertainment for MTV. He was a producer of the Ultimate Cage Fighting Championships (UCFC) MMA live event, Rumble on the Rivers in June 2009 at the Mellon Arena in Pittsburgh, Pennsylvania. That event was the first ever MMA live event in Pittsburgh since the state approved MMA in Pennsylvania.

He has also worked as a producer for various Xtreme Pro Wrestling (XPW) productions including the "Cold Day in Hell" national DVD release and is listed on the advisory board for Masked Republic, which is the first integrated live event, merchandising and media organization in the United States specializing in the emerging growth market of lucha libre.

Michaels has also worked as a producer/agent for the Urban Wrestling Federation live events and national pay-per-view releases in 2011. He continues to write and develop content for various entertainment production companies in the United States. He is one of the original owners/producers/bookers (along with Shane Douglas, Kevin Kleinrock, Steve O'Neill, and Mike O'Neill) of Extreme Rising. The promotion initially focused on an Extreme Championship Wrestling (ECW) reunion show in Philadelphia, which was a sold out event, drawing over 2,000 fans at the Philadelphia National Guard Armory, and continued to run live events in New York City, Philadelphia, and Pittsburgh through 2012-2013. Michaels can be seen in the 2013 documentary Barbed Wire City, which is a DVD released documentary about the history of ECW, some of the wrestlers, and its fan base through the years.

It was announced on Sunday, February 25, 2018 that Michaels, Brian Hildebrand and Angie Minelli made up the Class of 2018 Keystone State Wrestling Alliance (KSWA) Hall of Fame. The ceremony took place on Saturday, March 24, 2018 in Pittsburgh.

== Championships ==
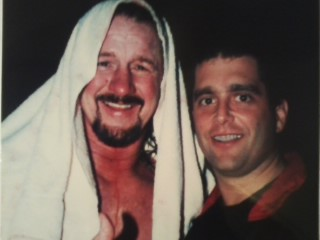
Michaels (right) and Terry Funk

- American States Wrestling Association
  - ASWA Light Heavyweight Championship (1 time)
- Steel City Wrestling
  - SCW Heavyweight Championship (1 time)
- United States Wrestling Association
  - USWA World Tag Team Championship (1 time) - with Jeff Jarrett

== Filmography ==
Film
Year	Film	Role	Notes
2013	Pro Wrestlers vs Zombies	Troy	

== See also ==
- Curtis Comes Home
