= Dominic DeNucci =

American wrestler & trainer (1932–2021)

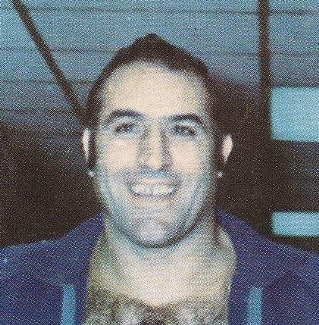
- DeNucci, c. 1976

Personal information
- Born: Domenico A. Nucciarone; January 23, 1932 Frosolone, Molise, Italy
- Died: August 12, 2021 (aged 89) McCandless Township, Pennsylvania, U.S.

Professional wrestling career
- Ring name(s): Dominic DeNucci; Dominic Bravo; The Masked Marvel
- Billed height: 6 ft 3 in (191 cm)
- Billed weight: 245 lb (111 kg)
- Billed from: Pittsburgh, Pennsylvania
- Trained by: Tony Lanza
- Debut: 1958
- Retired: April 14, 2012

Domenico A. Nucciarone (January 23, 1932 – August 12, 2021) was an Italian professional wrestler and trainer better known by the ring name Dominic DeNucci. He held over a dozen championships around the world in the 1960s and 1970s. In 1961, he was one of several Montreal wrestling stars to be featured in Wrestling (French: La lutte), a National Film Board of Canada documentary. His wrestling students included Mick Foley, Shane Douglas, Brian Hildebrand, and Cody Michaels.

== Professional wrestling career ==
=== Early career (1958–1964) ===
He made his pro wrestling debut in 1958 in Montreal, Quebec under a hood as the Masked Marvel and also wrestled in Ottawa, Ontario. In 1959, DeNucci started teaming with the original Dino Bravo as Dominic Bravo, a storyline/kayfabe brother as the two worked as a tag team in Canada throughout The Maritimes, Toronto, Ontario, and Winnipeg, Manitoba. They also worked in Cleveland and Buffalo. The team headed west for Calgary wrestling for Stampede Wrestling starting in 1962. DeNucci would keep the Bravo name until he left Stampede in 1963. He wrestled as Don DeNucci in the San Francisco territory in the latter half of 1963.

=== World Championship Wrestling (Australia) (1964–1966, 1968, 1970) ===
In 1964, DeNucci made his debut in Australia for World Championship Wrestling. He feuded with Killer Kowalski. On November 7, 1964, he defeated Kowalski for the IWA World Heavyweight Championship in Melbourne. He dropped the title to Ray Stevens on January 9, 1965. A month later he regained the title by defeating Stevens. On March 10 he dropped the title again to Stevens. He continued feuding with Kowalski. On February 12, 1966, he won the title for the third time defeating Kowalski. He held the title for 111 days until losing it to Toru Tanaka on June 3 in Sydney. Afterwards, he teamed with Kowalski and his Italian friend Bruno Sammartino feuding with Japanese heels Toru Tanaka and Mitsu Arakawa.

On July 1, 1966, he teamed with Mark Lewin as they defeated Larry Hennig and Harley Race for the IWA World Tag Team Championship. They dropped the title to Skull Murphy and Brute Bernard on July 15. After that DeNucci returned to North America. In May 1968 he returned this time teaming with Antonio Pugliese as they defeated Skull Murphy and Killer Karl Kox for the IWA World Tag Team title. They dropped it to Killer Kowalski and Bill Miller. He found a new partner Mario Milano and they defeated Kowalski and Miller for the title. Then they dropped the title to Mikel Scicluna and Ciclón Negro. In 1970 he made another return this time feuding with King Curtis Iaukea. On January 16 he won his fourth and final IWA World Heavyweight Championship defeating Iaukea. On March 25 he dropped the title to Iaukea.

=== Various promotions (1966–1978) ===
After he left Australia in 1966 he returned to North America wrestling in Vancouver, British Columbia, Canada, for a year. He wrestled in many territories in Cleveland, Buffalo, St. Louis, Chicago, and Big Time Wrestling in Detroit. Also, he was very popular in the Michigan/Ohio territory in the early 1970s as well as Toronto for Maple Leaf Wrestling from 1969 to 1978. In 1974 he wrestled for Championship Wrestling from Florida where he won the NWA Florida Tag Team Championship with Tony Parisi defeating Dick Slater and Toru Tanaka. They dropped the titles in 1975 to Slater and J. J. Dillon.

=== Japan (1971, 1972, 1979–1981) ===
In 1971, he went to Japan for the first time to work for Japan Pro Wrestling Alliance. In 1972 he worked for Giant Baba's brand new All Japan Pro Wrestling as Don Denucci. He lost a few matches to Baba. In 1979, he returned and feuded with Dick Beyer, Jumbo Tsuruta, Kim Duk and Great Kojika. He left the promotion in 1981.

=== World Wide Wrestling Federation (1967–1982) ===
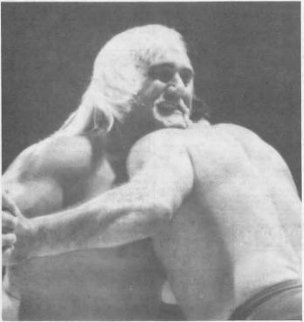
DeNucci (right) wrestling Hulk Hogan, c. 1980

DeNucci debuted in New York City in 1967. On June 18, 1971, DeNucci won his first World Wide Wrestling Federation (WWWF) title, the WWWF International Tag Team Championship, with Bruno Sammartino by defeating The Mongols (Bepo and Geto Mongol). They lost the title to The Mongols three days later. On May 13, 1975, DeNucci and Victor Rivera won the WWWF World Tag Team Championship from Jimmy and Johnny Valiant. In June, however, Rivera left the WWF, and Pat Barrett became DeNucci's replacement partner. They lost the title approximately three months later to The Blackjacks on August 26. DeNucci became a three-time WWWF World Tag Team Champion when he and his partner, the second Dino Bravo, defeated Professor Tanaka and Mr. Fuji on March 14, 1978. They held the title until June 26 when they dropped it to The Yukon Lumberjacks. DeNucci also unsuccessfully challenged inaugural WWF Intercontinental Champion Pat Patterson on a number of occasions for the IC belt in 1979 and 1980. He also worked with a young Hulk Hogan in 1981. He eventually transitioned into becoming a jobber, and left the company in 1982 after 15 years.

=== Later career (1982–1987) ===
After leaving the WWF, DeNucci returned to Toronto and wrestled there for a year. From 1984 to 1985 he wrestled for Lutte Internationale in Montreal and American Wrestling Association in Minnesota. He also worked in Saudi Arabia and the Philippines. On November 16, 1987, he returned to the World Wrestling Federation for a one night appearance at a house show in East Rutherford, New Jersey participating in a Legends Battle Royal won by Lou Thesz. After that he retired from wrestling at 55 years old.

=== Sporadic appearances (1990s) ===
During the 1990s, DeNucci wrestled five times. The first was a loss to Johnny Valiant by disqualification on November 9, 1990, at an event in Chesterland, Ohio. Then he defeated Johnny Hotbody on April 4, 1993, at Maccabiah Mania in Livingston, New Jersey. On May 13, 1994, he defeated Lord Zoltan at an IWA event in Warren, Ohio. On June 7, 1996, DeNucci reunited with Tony Parisi as they defeated Bruiser Bedlam and Danny Johnson at the Ilio DiPaolo Memorial Show in Buffalo, New York. Then on July 30, 1999, he defeated Lord Zoltan at Curtis Comes Home event in Rostraver, Pennsylvania. The show paid tribute to DeNucci's student Mark Curtis who died from cancer.

=== Return to wrestling on independent circuit (2005–2012) ===
In 2005, DeNucci came out of retirement at age 73. On August 27, 2005, he lost to Ivan Koloff in a Russian Chain match at WrestleReunion 2 in Philadelphia, Pennsylvania. He wrestled in the independent circuit in Pennsylvania for the rest of his career. Also he made appearances as a referee and manager. On March 24, 2007, he defeated Larry Zbyszko at International Wrestling Cartel's Night of Legends 3 in Franklin, Pennsylvania. He had Bruno Sammartino in his corner as a manager. On May 3, 2009, he teamed up with students Shane Douglas and Cody Michaels as they defeated J. J. Dillon, Lou Marconi and Frank Stalletto at Deaf Wrestlefest in Pittsburgh, Pennsylvania. He wrestled his last singles match on May 29, 2009, defeating Samuel Elias by count out at Far North Wrestling in New Castle, Pennsylvania. He wrestled his final match on April 14, 2012, in Toronto, teaming with his protege Shane Douglas to defeat Lord Zoltan and Shawn Blanchard at Pro Wrestling Superstars.

== Professional wrestling trainer ==
After ending his career as an active professional wrestler, he trained Moondog Spot, Mick Foley, Shane Douglas, Preston Steele and Brian Hildebrand among others. DeNucci is featured in Mick Foley: "Madman Unmasked", where he is seen training Mick Foley and reminiscing about Foley in the days of his training. He is also featured prominently in the opening chapters of Mick Foley's autobiography, Have a Nice Day: A Tale of Blood and Sweatsocks. DeNucci was profiled on the fourth episode of the podcast, Titans of Wrestling. In 2012 he was inducted into the Professional Wrestling Hall of Fame.

== Personal life and death ==
DeNucci was Catholic and spoke at least four languages: English, French, Spanish, and Italian. In June 2020, Dominic experienced heart issues and was hospitalized.

DeNucci died on August 12, 2021, at UPMC Passavant Hospital in McCandless Township, Pennsylvania, at the age of 89.

== Championships and accomplishments ==
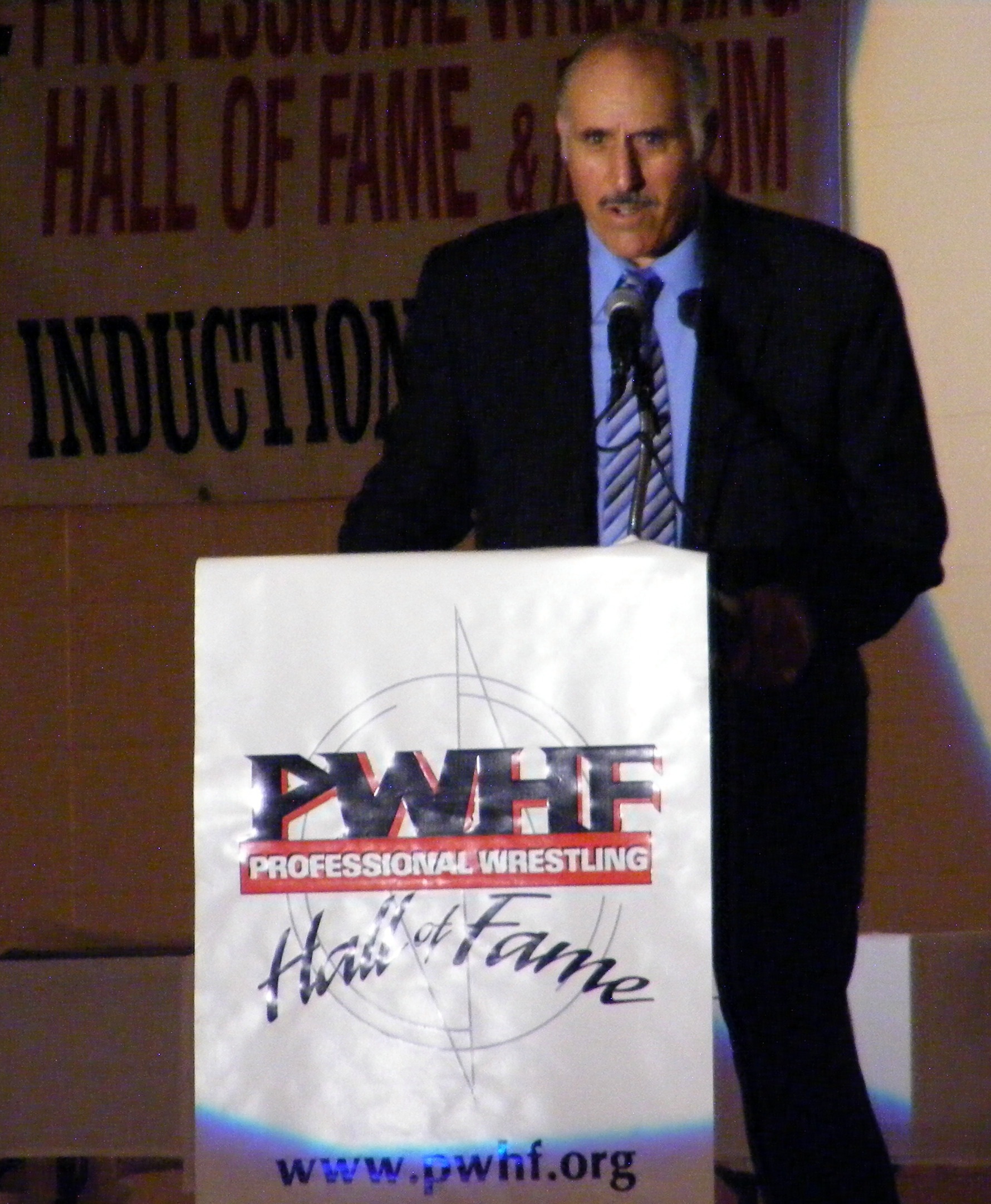
DeNucci speaks at the Professional Wrestling Hall of Fame ceremony in 2012

- American Wrestling Alliance
  - AWA United States Heavyweight Championship (1 time)
- Big Time Wrestling
  - BTW East Coast Heavyweight Championship (1 time)
- Championship Wrestling from Florida
  - NWA Florida Tag Team Championship (1 time) - with Tony Parisi
- Lutte Internationale
  - Canadian International Tag Team Championship (1 time) - with Nick DeCarlo
- NWA All-Star Wrestling
  - NWA Canadian Tag Team Championship (Vancouver version) (1 time) - with Don Leo Jonathan
  - NWA World Tag Team Championship (Vancouver version) (1 time) - with Don Leo Jonathan
- NWA Detroit
  - NWA World Tag Team Championship (1 time) – with Chris Markoff
- National Wrestling Federation
  - NWF Heavyweight Championship ( 1 time )
  - NWF World Tag Team Championship (2 times) - with Tony Parisi
- New Independent Wrestling Association
  - NIWA Tag Team Championship (1 time) - with Mr. Hati
- Ohio Professional Wrestling Hall of Fame
  - Ohio Professional Wrestling Hall of Fame (Class of 2022)
- Professional Wrestling Hall of Fame
  - Class of 2012
- Stampede Wrestling
  - Stampede International Tag Team Championship (3 times) - with Ron Etchinson
- World Championship Wrestling (Australia)
  - IWA World Heavyweight Championship (3 times)
  - IWA World Tag Team Championship (3 times) - with Mark Lewin (1), Antonio Pugliese (1) and Mario Milano (1)
- World Wrestling Association (Indianapolis)
  - WWA World Tag Team Championship (1 time) - with Wilbur Snyder
- World Wide Wrestling Federation
  - WWWF International Tag Team Championship (1 time) - with Bruno Sammartino
  - WWWF World Tag Team Championship (2 times) - with Victor Rivera and replacement partner Pat Barrett (1), and Dino Bravo (1)
- Wrestling Observer Newsletter
  - Wrestling Observer Newsletter Hall of Fame (Class 2026)
- Upstate Wrestling ( WWWF Buffalo affiliate)
  - North American Heavyweight Championship ( 2 times )
- Other titles
  - Ohio Heavyweight Championship (1 time)
  - West Virginia Tag Team Championship (1 time) - with Apache Lou
