= John Beaird =

American screenwriter

John Beaird (April 9, 1953 – July 9, 1993) was a screenwriter and film producer. He was responsible for scripting two of the most well-known slasher films of the early 1980s, My Bloody Valentine (1981) and Happy Birthday To Me (1981), though his work on the latter went uncredited. My Bloody Valentine is notorious for its rough treatment at the hands of the MPAA, which demanded extensive cutting of the film's gore. Beaird died in 1993 in Los Angeles, California.

== Filmography ==
=== Screenplays ===
- My Bloody Valentine (1981)
- Happy Birthday To Me (1981 - co-screenplay, uncredited)
- Trapped (1982)
- North Beach and Rawhide (1985 - story, co-teleplay)

=== Producer ===
- The Cover Girl and the Cop (1989)
- Caroline? (1990)

=== Actor ===
- Challenger (1990)
