= My Bloody Valentine (film) =

1981 Canadian slasher film

- Theatrical release poster
- Directed by: George Mihalka
- Screenplay by: John Beaird
- Story by: Stephen Miller
- Produced by: John Dunning; André Link; Stephen Miller
- Starring: Paul Kelman; Lori Hallier; Neil Affleck
- Cinematography: Rodney Gibbons
- Edited by: Gérald Vansier; Rit Wallis
- Music by: Paul Zaza
- Production companies: Canadian Film Development Corporation; Secret Film Company; Famous Players
- Distributed by: Paramount Pictures
- Release dates: February 11, 1981 (United States); February 13, 1981 (Canada)
- Running time: 90 minutes (Theatrical); 93 minutes (Extended)
- Country: Canada
- Language: English
- Budget: CA$2.3 million
- Box office: US$5.7 million

My Bloody Valentine is a 1981 Canadian slasher film directed by George Mihalka and written by John Beaird, from a story by Stephen Miller. The film stars Paul Kelman, Lori Hallier, and Neil Affleck. It follows young adults in a mining town who plan a Valentine's Day party despite warnings tied to a local legend about a murderous miner.

Produced and shot in 1980, the film was filmed on location in Sydney Mines, Nova Scotia. Paramount Pictures acquired North American distribution and released it theatrically in February 1981. It grossed $5.7 million at the box office. Reviews were mixed, with some critics singling out the mine setting and cinematography and others criticizing its violence and similarities to other slasher films of the period.

The film is also known for censorship disputes: the MPAA required substantial cuts for an R rating, with several minutes of gore removed from the original release. A 2009 Lionsgate home-media release restored roughly two-and-a-half minutes of previously missing footage, though a fully uncut version remains unreleased. A remake, My Bloody Valentine 3D, was released in 2009.

== Plot ==
Mayor Hanniger of Valentine Bluffs, a Canadian mining town, reinstates the traditional Valentine's Day dance, which has been suspended for twenty years following an accident in Hanniger Mine, in which two supervisors left their posts to attend the town's annual Valentine's Day dance. Because they forgot to check methane levels in the mining tunnels, an explosion caused the tunnel to cave in, killing all the miners except for one - Harry Warden. Warden resorted to cannibalism to survive and went insane from the ordeal. The next year, he murdered the two supervisors who had left their posts the previous year, cut out their hearts, and placed them in Valentine's Day candy boxes, with a note from Harry, who was subsequently institutionalized in an insane asylum, warning the town never to hold the Valentine's Day Dance ever again or he would commit more killings.

With the dances back on, several residents become excited for the upcoming event, including Sarah Mercer and Axel Palmer, as well as Gretchen, Dave, Hollis, Patty, Sylvia, Howard, Mike, John, Tommy, and Harriet, and the mayor's son, T.J., who is embroiled in a tense love triangle with Sarah and Axel. Soon, however, Mayor Hanniger and the town's police chief, Jake Newby, receive an anonymous box of Valentine's chocolates containing a human heart, and a note warning that murders will begin if the dance proceeds. That evening, resident Mabel is murdered by a mining-geared killer in a laundromat, and her heart is removed. Newby publicly reports that she died of a heart attack to prevent panic. He contacts the mental institution where Harry Warden was incarcerated, but they have no record of him. Hanniger and Newby cancel the dance, but the town's youngsters decide to hold their own party at the mine. A bartender warns them against it, but is killed by the miner while trying to set up a dummy miner to scare the group.

At the party, the miner confronts Dave in the kitchen and kills him by shoving his face into a boiling pot of hot dogs, in which his heart is later found. Shortly after, Sylvia is impaled on a showerhead by the miner. When the others realize Dave and Sylvia have been murdered, they contact authorities, but several of the partygoers have already decided to enter the mines for fun. TJ and Axel enter the mines to rescue them. Hollis leaves to find Mike and Harriet, who have been impaled by a large drill. He is subsequently shot in the head with a nail gun by the killer, who confronts the others as Howard flees in horror. Patty, TJ, Axel, and Sarah try to climb to the top with a ladder, but Howard's corpse, tied to a rope, falls from above.

While finding their way out, Axel seemingly drowns, and Patty is killed by the miner with a pickaxe. The miner chases T.J. and Sarah, and a fight ensues. The miner is revealed to be Axel, who faked his demise. It is revealed that Axel's father was one of the supervisors killed by Harry Warden, and Axel witnessed the murder himself as a child, leaving him traumatized. T.J. hits Axel with a rock, causing the tunnel to collapse and trapping Axel as Newby and the police arrive to rescue T.J. and Sarah. Chief Newby reveals to them that Harry Warden died five years earlier. T.J. and Sarah hear a rescuer shout that Axel is still alive, and they rush back to the scene. They watch as Axel frees himself from the debris by amputating his trapped arm. He runs deeper into the mine shouting threats that he and Harry Warden will return and murder everyone in town, and mumbling about Sarah being his "bloody valentine".

== Cast ==
- Paul Kelman as Tom Jesse "T.J." Hanniger
- Lori Hallier as Sarah Mercer
- Neil Affleck as Axel Palmer
  - Jeff Banks as Young Axel Palmer
- Cynthia Dale as Patty
- Don Francks as Chief Jake Newby
- Keith Knight as Hollis
- Alf Humphreys as Howard Landers
- Terry Waterland as Harriet
- Thomas Kovacs as Mike Stavinski
- Helene Udy as Sylvia
- Rob Stein as John
- Patricia Hamilton as Mabel Osborne
- Gina Dick as Gretchen
- Larry Reynolds as Mayor Hanniger
- Jim Murchison as Tommy Whitcomb
- Carl Marotte as Dave
- Jack Van Evera as "Happy"
- Peter Cowper as Harry Warden / The Miner

== Production ==
=== Development ===
Director George Mihalka, on the strength of his earlier movie Pick-Up Summer, was approached by Cinépix, headed by André Link and John Dunning with a two-movie contract. Mihalka was asked to direct a horror-slasher story, presented to Dunning by Stephen Miller in mid-1980, and, after Mihalka agreed to direct, John Beaird was brought in to write the screenplay.

The film originally had the working title The Secret. However, the producers decided to change it to My Bloody Valentine, so to overtly reference the holiday serial killer trend with which the slasher genre was becoming increasingly popular, through films such as Black Christmas (1974), Halloween (1978) and Friday the 13th (1980). At the time, the slasher sub-genre had seen further commercial success with the releases of Prom Night and Terror Train (both 1980).

=== Casting ===
Paul Kelman was cast in the lead role of T.J., while Neil Affleck was cast as Axel, his former friend and coworker.

Lori Hallier was cast as Sarah, the girlfriend of Axel and ex-girlfriend of T.J. Hallier arrived to the set several weeks after the other actors, as she had prior obligations at the National Theatre School of Canada where she was studying at the time; director Mihalka, intent on casting her in the role, convinced her academic advisors to allow her to finish the semester early in order to appear in the film.

=== Filming ===
Shooting on My Bloody Valentine began in September 1980, taking place around the Princess Colliery Mine in Sydney Mines, Nova Scotia, which had closed in 1975. Filming completed in November 1980. The budget was approximately $2.3 million. Two mines were considered for the setting, the other in Glace Bay, Nova Scotia. The production company decided on the Sydney Mines location due to "the exterior [being] a dreary, cold and dusty area [with] no other buildings around it so it looked like it was totally in the middle of nowhere".

Mihalka has said since making the movie that the most difficult element of My Bloody Valentine was filming in the mines. Located 2,700 feet (820 m) underground, filming in the mine was a lengthy process, as, due to limited space in the elevators, it would take an hour to transport the cast and crew to the location. Also, due to the methane levels underground, lighting had to be carefully planned as the number of bulbs that could be safely utilised was limited. Prior to the production's arrival to the mine, the owners thoroughly cleaned the location, leaving it described as a "clean and colourful Disneyland-like set". This resulted in the production team spending an estimated $30,000 to paint portions of the mine to achieve a darker atmosphere, akin to how it had appeared in its original state. Producer Dunning referred to the shoot as "horrendous".

The crew kept the identity of the killer a secret to the cast members until the end of production, when the final scene was shot, in order to assure the actors played their parts in an ambiguous manner.

=== "The Ballad of Harry Warden" ===
Although it was not credited on the film itself, the vocals for the end credits song, "The Ballad of Harry Warden", as well as other music cues heard in the film, were provided by Scottish-Canadian tenor John McDermott. In an interview with the Ghouls in the House podcast – his first and only interview on the subject – McDermott explained that he was a family friend of the film's composer, Paul Zaza, and just out of school when offered the opportunity to record vocals for the film.

== Release ==
In December 1980, Paramount Pictures acquired North American distribution for My Bloody Valentine. The film was released in the United States on February 11, 1981, and in Canada two days later.

=== Censorship ===
My Bloody Valentine was heavily censored in North America upon its theatrical release. For the Motion Picture Association of America (MPAA) to award the movie with an R-rating, cuts were requested to every death sequence in the film. Producer Dunning said the film was "cut to ribbons" in order to achieve an R-rating. Even after cutting the film to match the requirements made by the MPAA, it was again returned with an X-rating and further cuts were demanded. Stills of the trimmed footage were published in Fangoria magazine whilst the film was still in production, though the sequences were excised from the theatrical version. Even today the complete uncut version has not been released (though the 2009 DVD and Blu-ray release by Lionsgate reinstated three minutes of excised footage). The standard North American theatrical cut of the film ran approximately 90 minutes. In the United Kingdom, the film was passed for theatrical release by the British Board of Film Classification (BBFC) on March 30, 1981. According to the BBFC catalogue, this version ran at 90 minutes and 55 seconds.

There are two reasons that are frequently attributed to the extreme cutting of the film. It has been suggested that Paramount Pictures was keen to remove the offending footage due to the backlash they had received from releasing Friday the 13th the previous year. The second reason, that Mihalka attributes, is that the film was cut due to the murder of John Lennon in December 1980, stating that there was a major backlash against movie violence in the wake of his death.

=== Restoration efforts ===
An uncensored cut of My Bloody Valentine remained unavailable to the public for nearly thirty years after its original theatrical release. When Paramount released the film on DVD in North America for the first time in 2002, the studio claimed that the purported "missing" footage did not exist.

In 2008, Lionsgate licensed the home video rights to the film after producing a feature film remake, and in the process, acquired a copy with excised footage never before seen in the standard theatrical cut of the film. In January 2009, Lionsgate under license from Paramount released an unrated Region 1 "Special Edition" DVD and Blu-ray featuring this footage. The DVD/Blu-ray allows viewers the option to watch the standard R-rated version of the film, as well as an uncensored version in which excised violent footage is reinstated. Despite this, three scenes play in their unrated form regardless of which version is being viewed: the flashbacks of Axel's father's death, and Harry Warden with the arm. Commenting on the release, director Mihalka said: "[With this release] we have it back to 80% of the image back and 95% of the impact back".

In total, the 2009 "Special Edition" DVD/Blu-ray reinstates approximately two-and-a-half minutes of previously unreleased footage back into the film, which contradicts an earlier claim by director Mihalka that it had been trimmed by 8–9 minutes. It has been argued that the so-called uncut DVD/Blu-ray is still missing additional footage, particularly the double-impalement of Mike and Harriet which the director recalls filming. It is thought that the remaining footage appears to be composed of expository scenes, such as dialogue and other non-violence related material. This is given credence by the fact that Mihalka gave his seal of approval to this release, and a written introduction by him precedes the beginning of the special edition DVD/Blu-ray, stating that this version was the way that the film was meant to be seen.

=== Home media ===
My Bloody Valentine was released to VHS, Betamax and LaserDisc in 1982. The film made its DVD debut on September 3, 2002, from Paramount Home Video; this was a standard widescreen release of the theatrical cut, and it contained no bonus materials. The same disc was re-issued as a DVD double feature with April Fool's Day (1986; also a Paramount title) on March 18, 2008.

The aforementioned "Special Edition" DVD version of the film from Lionsgate was released in North America on January 13, 2009, coinciding with the theatrical release of the remake. This version integrates the cut footage back into the film and features two featurettes and optional introductory sequences to the previously missing murder sequences. Two featurettes are also included. Director Mihalka, cast members Lori Hallier, Neil Affleck, Helene Udy, and Carl Marotte, composer Paul Zaza and make-up artists Thomas Burman and Ken Diaz are all involved. A Blu-ray was released on November 24, 2009, from Lionsgate, on loan from Paramount. The disc contained the same bonus materials as the "Special Edition" DVD released in January the same year. The Blu-ray is now out of print. Scream Factory released a new 2-disc Blu-ray edition on February 11, 2020. It contains a brand new 4K transfer of both versions of the movie. Unlike the Lionsgate release, Shout! Factory utilises the original negative for many of the uncut scenes, with only a few brief shots still using the print from the previous release but with additional clean ups. On September 26, 2023, Scream Factory released a 4K Ultra HD Blu-ray, including only the uncut version on 4K resolution and the theatrical version on Blu-ray resolution and included all the content from the previous 2020 Blu-ray.

== Reception ==
=== Box office ===
My Bloody Valentine grossed US$5,672,031 at the United States box office. Though the U.S. gross exceeded the film's $2.3 million budget, it was considered a box-office disappointment by Paramount Pictures, returning a "derisory sum of $3.3 million". This profit amounted to less than one-third of Paramount's Friday the 13th, released the year before.

=== Critical response ===
==== Contemporary ====
Upon its release, My Bloody Valentine received numerous reviews criticizing it for its depiction of violence and gore. Bruce Bailey of the Montreal Gazette noted the film as having an "awkward script": "All that's really notable about My Bloody Valentine is that it gives you more than the usual m.p.g.p.—murders per gallon of popcorn". Tom Buckley of The New York Times echoed a similar sentiment, writing: "My Bloody Valentine probably won't make you shiver with fright, but it's almost certain to make you squirm, first with irritation and then with revulsion". The Detroit Free Press's Jack Mathews conversely complimented the film on delivering "on its title promise by bucketfuls", adding: "There's nothing subtle about My Bloody Valentine. A pickax to the belly, a 10-penny nail through the forehead, a granite drill through the back. There are some passing attempts at comic relief, but most of the yuks are inadvertent". Ernest Leogrande of the New York Daily News noted the film as bearing similarity to other slasher films of the time, but conceded: "Movies like this are designed to make you jump, scream, hide your eyes, hug your date and talk with glee about what bad taste the movie makers are capable of. My Bloody Valentine does all that". In their television series Sneak Preview, critics Gene Siskel and Roger Ebert each gave the film a "thumbs down" review, with Ebert describing it as "about the seventh direct rip-off of Halloween", the 1978 film which both critics agreed was a well-made thriller that inspired many lackluster imitations.

Several reviewers were critical of the film's partial financing by the Canadian Film Development Corporation, which used taxed income from Canadian provinces to help fund its production. Among them were John Dodd of the Edmonton Journal, who also lambasted the film as a "rip off" of Halloween (1978): "All this perverted gore is brought to you thanks to the financial help of the Canadian Film Development Corp. which uses your own tax money to help greedy, talentless producers make a killing, you should pardon the expression". Gene Siskel of the Chicago Tribune also noted the corporation's financing in his review, in which he awarded the film one out of four stars, deeming it a "dismal and depressing horror film" and "another entry in that most depressing of film genres, the mad-slasher-with-a-knife". The Windsor Star's Ted Shaw was critical of the performances and violence, writing: "The acting is terrible and the main thrust of the film is to recreate the atmosphere of an abattoir. The movie is more maddening than scary."

Ed Blank of the Pittsburgh Press faulted the film's cinematography and mine setting, writing that its "novelty, for the worse as it happens, is that the principal setting is a coal mine where most of the male characters work. Shooting scenes in the mine, brightened only by the miners' hats, permits Mihalka to play without a full deck. You can't tell what's going on". Dan Scapperotti of Cinefantastique, alternately praised the film's cinematography, writing "[it] is beautifully photographed, and the utilization of the mine creates powerful imagery".

Some reviewers were also likely unaware of the amount of censorship the film received. Writing for The Atlanta Constitution, Richard Zoglin noted that the film "floats along effortlessly in the current flood of schlock-horror films unleashed by John Carpenter's Halloween. But it is more restrained—even tasteful—than most. The camera averts its eyes from much of the blood and gore, and women are treated somewhat better than usual (that is, they are generally allowed to keep their clothes on before being dispatched)". While praising the film for constraining the amount of violence shown, Zoglin criticized the characters and the plot for being "uninteresting" and "predictable". Linda Gross of the Los Angeles Times said the film was "too convoluted, too derivative and, oddly, too ambitious to properly coagulate into the kind of exploitation movie that it tries to be". However, she conceded that the film's cinematography is "sharp", and the musical score "portentous".

==== Retrospective ====
On the review aggregator website Rotten Tomatoes, 39% of 62 critics' reviews are positive. The website's consensus reads: "My Bloody Valentine stumbles through a cinematic coal mine of mechanical scares, bland characters, and a contrived, blood-soaked plot that's as predictable as it is unimaginative." Metacritic, which uses a weighted average, assigned the film a score of 46 out of 100, based on 5 critics, indicating "mixed or average" reviews.

In a March 30, 2007 issue of Entertainment Weekly, the film was ranked 17 in a list of guilty pleasures, listed among such films as Dawn of the Dead and Escape from New York, and called "the most criminally underappreciated of the slasher genre". Popular filmmaker Quentin Tarantino said it may be his all-time favorite slasher film. In a retrospective assessment, film historian Adam Rockoff wrote that the film was "easily one of the best and most polished slasher films".

In another retrospective assessment by scholar Jim Harper in his book Legacy of Blood: A Comprehensive Guide to Slasher Movies, he notes that the film distinguishes itself from other slashers by moving outside the "typical teen based scenario", instead focusing on a group of young adults in a working class community, and relying on a notable "atmosphere dread".

== Related works ==
A remake titled My Bloody Valentine 3D was released in theaters on January 13, 2009. It kept largely the same character names, but features many changes from the original film.

Following a 2021 Indiegogo campaign, a fan-made sequel named Valentine Bluffs was released on YouTube on Valentine's Day, 2023. Taking place 40 years after the events of the original film, T.J. and Sarah's estranged child returns to Valentine Bluffs following his mother's death as a new string of murders by a man in a mining suit begin.

In 2024, Blumhouse Productions announced that they are developing a reboot of My Bloody Valentine.

== Bibliography ==
- Blake, Linnie (2013). The Wounds of Nations: Horror Cinema, Historical Trauma and National Identity. Manchester: Manchester University Press. ISBN 978-0-719-07593-3.
- Harper, Jim (2004). Legacy of Blood: A Comprehensive Guide to Slasher Movies. London: Critical Vision. ISBN 978-1-900-48639-2.
- Leeder, Murray (2018). Horror Film: A Critical Introduction. New York: Bloomsbury USA. ISBN 978-1-501-31444-5.
- Muir, John Kenneth (2012). Horror Films of the 1980s. Vol. 1. Jefferson, North Carolina: McFarland. ISBN 978-0-786-47298-7.
- Nowell, Richard (2011). Blood Money: A History of the First Teen Slasher Film Cycle. New York: Continuum International Publishing Group. ISBN 978-1-441-18850-2.
- Pike, David L. (2012). Canadian Cinema Since the 1980s: At the Heart of the World. Toronto, Ontario: University of Toronto Press. ISBN 978-1-442-61240-2.
- Roche, David (2014). Making and Remaking Horror in the 1970s and 2000s: Why Don't They Do It Like They Used To?. Jackson, Mississippi: University Press of Mississippi. ISBN 978-1-626-74246-8.
- Rockoff, Adam (2011) [2002]. Going to Pieces: The Rise and Fall of the Slasher Film, 1978-1986. Jefferson, North Carolina: McFarland. ISBN 978-0-786-46932-1.
