= I'm Going to Get You, Elliott Boy =

- Directed by: Ed Forsyth
- Screenplay by: Joseph E. Duhamel; Ed Forsyth; Paul Fulford; Jerry Thomas
- Produced by: Avron M. Slutker
- Starring: Ross Stephanson; Maureen McGill
- Cinematography: Peter Reusch
- Edited by: Ed Forsyth
- Music by: Allan Alper
- Production company: Cinepro
- Release date: June 2, 1971
- Running time: 75 minutes
- Country: Canada
- Language: English

I'm Going to Get You, Elliott Boy is a Canadian prison drama film, directed by Ed Forsyth and released in 1971. The film stars Ross Stephanson as Elliott Markson, a young man who is sent to prison after being set up to rob a bank by his girlfriend Sherri (Maureen McGill), and is hardened by the experience until becoming a cold-blooded killer, principally by the prevalence of prison rape and physical and mental abuse.

== Synopsis ==
Elliot has just gotten out of college, and is persuaded by his cheating girlfriend to serve as the getaway driver for a botched bank robbery. His girlfriend ends up double crossing him and turns him in to the police. He is sentenced to two years in prison, where he is subjected to the harsh realities of prison.

== Cast ==
- Ross Stephenson
- Maureen McGill
- Jeremy Hart
- Edward Blessington
- Don MacQuarrie
- Richard Gishler
- Paul Kelman
- Donald Cook
- Anthony Weaver
- Cliff Betty
- John Fraser
- Doug Hepburn
- Bob McCord
- Robert Harvey
- Abdullah the Butcher

== Production and distribution ==
The film had its genesis when Joseph Duhamel, a journalist and prison reform advocate who claimed to have once committed a crime in the United States solely so that he could be sent to the United States Medical Center for Federal Prisoners to accomplish his goal of interviewing Robert "the Birdman of Alcatraz" Stroud, met Avron Slutker, the owner of a chain of drycleaning shops in Edmonton, Alberta. Slutker initially agreed to provide funding for Duhamel's story outline about a young man's experience in the prison system, but after several years of little progress being made on the film, Slutker directly stepped in to salvage the film by producing it himself and hiring director Ed Forsyth.

Forsyth completed the screenplay with the assistance of writers Paul Fulford and Jerry Thomas, and the film went into production in 1970. It was shot principally at the CFB Griesbach detention barracks in Edmonton, along with a few scenes shot in Slutker's own home, and was acted predominantly by a cast of amateur local actors from the Edmonton area apart from the casting of wrestler Abdullah the Butcher in a supporting role as a corrupt prison guard.

The film premiered on June 2, 1971 at the Rialto Theatre in Edmonton. It was later entered into the Best Motion Picture competition at the 23rd Canadian Film Awards.

== Critical response ==
Roger Noel, a warden of the provincial jail in Fort Saskatchewan, attended the premiere, and agreed with the film's thesis that reform of the penal system was needed.

John Laycock of the Windsor Star called the film "flat and toneless", but asserted that it was a noteworthy achievement for filmmaking novices to make a film that was "as good as anybody else's bad movie".

Frank Daley of the Ottawa Journal characterized the film as a "slovenly pot-boiler" whose "acting, script and directing are amateurish and often painful", while Jamie Portman of the Calgary Herald wrote that the film had an awful screenplay, but that Forsyth's direction was better than his screenwriting.

Portman also noted that the film "candidly examines one of the most upsetting aspects of the penal system — the widespread incidence of homosexuality. There is no evasiveness in dealing with the subject." Les Wedman of the Vancouver Sun concurred, writing that the matter of what men do for sex when there are no women available seemed to be the only question the film was interested in exploring.

Brian Busby, in a piece investigating the limited publication history of screenwriter Paul Fulford, described the film as an apparent "rip-off of John Herbert's 1967 play Fortune and Men's Eyes".
