= Face (professional wrestling) =

Type of character in professional wrestling

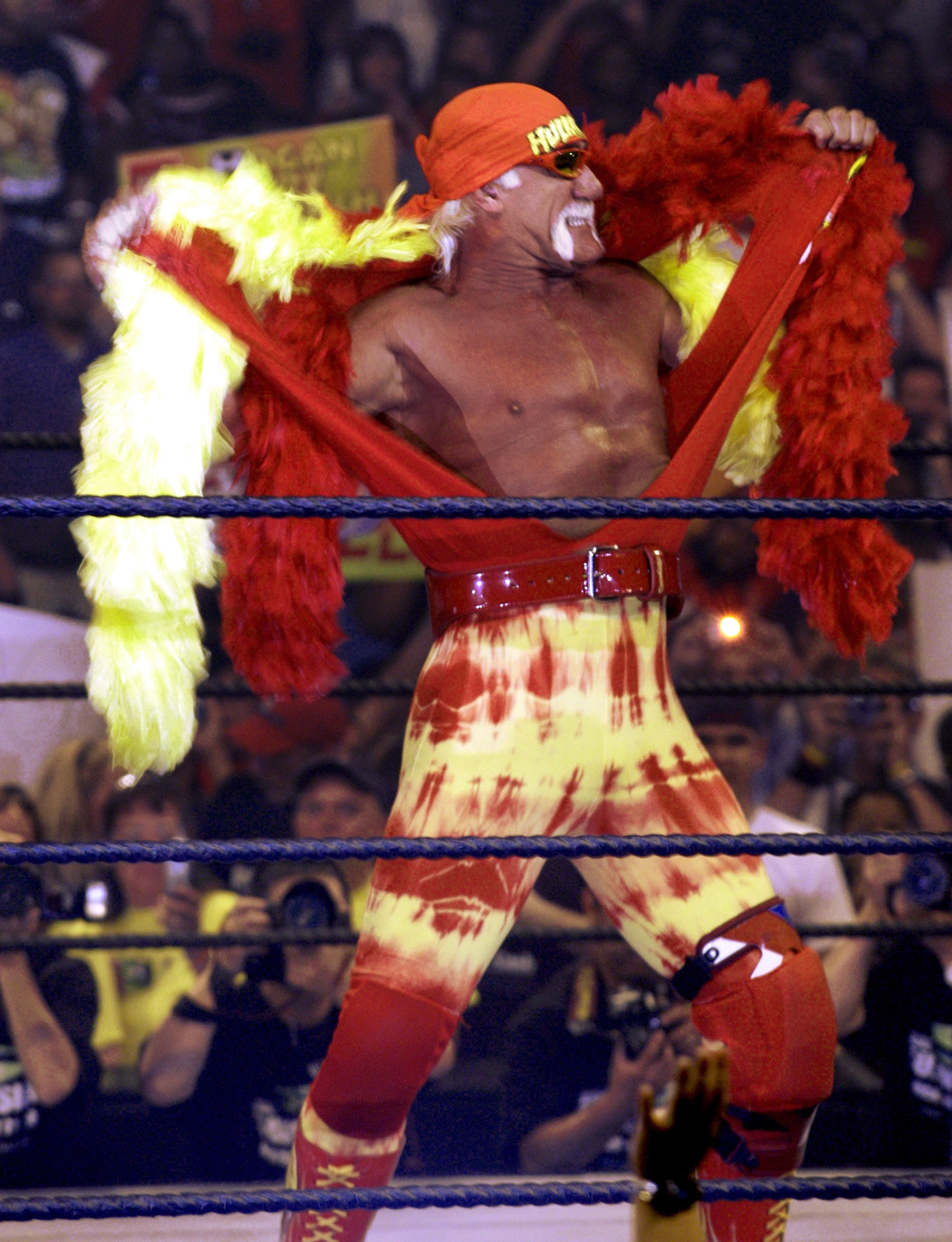
Hulk Hogan became one of wrestling's most famous babyfaces during the 1980s professional wrestling boom.

In professional wrestling, a face (babyface) is a heroic, "good guy", "good-doer", or "fan favorite" wrestler, booked (scripted) by the promotion with the aim of being cheered by fans. They are portrayed as heroes relative to the heel wrestlers, who are analogous to villains. Traditionally, face characters wrestle within the rules and avoid cheating while behaving positively towards the referee and the audience. Such characters are also referred to as blue-eyes in British wrestling and técnicos in lucha libre. Not everything a face wrestler does must be heroic: faces need only to be clapped or cheered by the audience to be effective characters. When the magazine Pro Wrestling Illustrated went into circulation in the late 1970s, the magazine referred to face wrestlers as "fan favorites" or "scientific wrestlers", while heels were referred to as simply "rulebreakers".

The vast majority of wrestling storylines involve pitting faces against heels, although more elaborate set-ups (such as two faces being manipulated by a nefarious outside party into fighting, or simply having a clean sportsmanly contest) often happen as well.

In the world of lucha libre wrestling, most técnicos are generally known for using moves requiring technical skill, particularly aerial maneuvers and wearing outfits using bright colors with positive associations (such as solid white). This is contrasted with most villainous rudos who are generally known for being brawlers, using physical moves that emphasize brute strength or size while often having outfits akin to demons or other nasty characters. Most técnicos tend to have slighter builds than rudos as to more reliably perform the spectacular acrobatics that define their role, although there are still many ways for a heavyweight técnico to express their superior skill.

== History ==
Traditional faces are classic "good guy" characters who rarely break the rules, follow instructions of those in authority such as the referee, are polite and well-mannered towards the fans and often overcome the rule-breaking actions of their heel opponents to cleanly win matches. While many modern faces still fit this model, other versions of the face character are now also common. A good example would be Stone Cold Steve Austin, who despite playing a heel early on in his career would start to be seen more of an antihero because of his popularity with the fans. While clearly not championing rule following, nor submission to authority, Austin was still regarded as the face in many of his duels such as his rivalry with World Wrestling Federation (WWF, later WWE) owner Mr. McMahon.

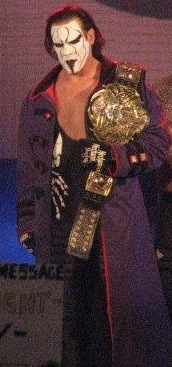
During the 1990s, some faces, such as Sting (pictured), used tactics more commonly associated with heels.

The portrayal of face wrestlers changed in the 1990s with the birth of Extreme Championship Wrestling (ECW), the start of World Championship Wrestling's (WCW) New World Order (nWo) storyline, and the Attitude Era of the WWF. During this time, wrestlers like Stone Cold Steve Austin and Sting used tactics traditionally associated with heels, but remained popular with the fans. Professional wrestling had just come off a huge steroid scandal and was facing poor ratings compared to the 1980s, and as a result, professional wrestling transformed into an edgier, more mature product. In this new era of professional wrestling, the standard face was more profane, violent, and uncontrollable.

In contrast to the emerging new breed of faces, Kurt Angle was introduced to the then-WWF with an American hero gimmick based on his gold medal win at the 1996 Summer Olympics. Angle presented himself as a role model and stressed the need to work hard to realize one's dreams. Although such a personality appears appropriate for a face wrestler, Angle's character was arrogant and constantly reminded people of his Olympic glory, behaving as if he thought he was better than the fans. Angle's character served as a meta-reference to how wrestling had changed. Although his character was intended to be a heel and behaved accordingly, some commentators speculated that if Angle attempted to get over as a face using a more heroic version of the same character, he would have failed. Unusually, Angle did not use any of these heroic mannerisms when playing a face character, instead acting as somewhat of an antihero with a few elements of the "lovable loser" character archetype.

The majority of the time, faces who are low-carders, or lesser known, are used as jobbers. These wrestlers usually lose matches against established wrestlers, often heels that then lose to the top faces.

== Fan reactions ==
Fans sometimes dislike face wrestlers despite the way they are promoted. Some reasons for this include repetitive in-ring antics, a limited moveset, a lengthy title reign, lack of selling their opponents' moves, or an uninteresting character. This often results in wrestlers who are supposed to be cheered receiving a negative or no reaction from the fans. When this happens, it can prompt a change in character for the wrestler in question. For example, Batista's run as a face upon his return to the WWE in 2014 was met with overwhelmingly negative reactions from the fans. Because of this unexpected reaction, Batista turned heel within just a few months of his return.

The reaction of the fans can also influence a wrestler's booking and position on the card. Faces that get more support than expected sometimes move closer towards the main event scene, while those getting less of a reaction than hoped might move down on the card. While Batista was getting bad reactions in 2014, another face Daniel Bryan, was getting incredibly positive support. Loud "Yes!" chants that had become synonymous with Bryan were present at any show he was on, and eventually the main event of WrestleMania XXX would be changed from Batista vs Randy Orton for the WWE World Heavyweight Championship, to a triple threat match with Daniel Bryan which he would go on to win.

== Mannerisms ==
Wrestler Rey Mysterio is an example of a pure face who has played heroic roles for almost his entire career, with his lucha libre inspired outfit prominently displaying Christian crosses.

Some face wrestlers often give high fives or give out merchandise to fans while entering the ring before their match, such as T-shirts, sunglasses, hats and masks. Bret Hart was one of the first superstars to make this popular, as he would drape his signature sunglasses on a child in the audience. Rey Mysterio, who has been a face in WWE since his debut, would go to any fan (frequently a child) wearing a replica of his mask and touch their head with his head for good luck before wrestling. Other examples include John Cena throwing his shirts and caps in the crowd before entering a match and Cody Rhodes giving his belt to a child in the audience when he was a face.

Some faces, such as Bret Hart and Ricky Steamboat, promoted an image as a "family man" and supported their persona by appearing with their family members before and after matches. Steamboat famously carried his 8-month-old son Richard Jr. into the ring with him at WrestleMania IV before his match with Greg "The Hammer" Valentine, then handing him to his wife Bonnie before the match started, and was accompanied to the ring by his family during his rivalry with Ric Flair in Jim Crockett Promotions to contrast with Flair's party animal "Nature Boy" persona. These actions often relate to wrestlers promoting charity work or other actions outside the ring, blurring the lines between scripted wrestling and their personal lives.

In the ring, traditional faces are expected to abide by the rules and win matches by their own skill rather than by cheating, outside interference etc. Because heel wrestlers take little issues with using such tactics, the face enters many matches already at a disadvantage to the heel. By putting the face in a difficult situation, it can help to draw out sympathy and support from the audience. Traditional faces similar to Hulk Hogan tend to draw on support from the crowd when it's time for them to make their big comeback.

In addition to wrestlers, commentators also portray face and heel dynamics. It is the job of the face commentator to criticize the tactics and behavior of the heel wrestler and gather support for the face wrestler. The face commentator gathers support for the face wrestler by mentioning how much of a disadvantage he is at, or by praising the hero's morality and valor.

== Gallery of famous faces ==
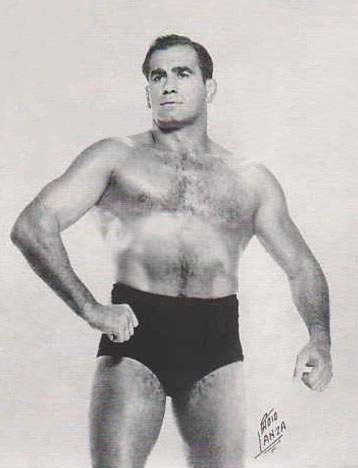
Lou Thesz

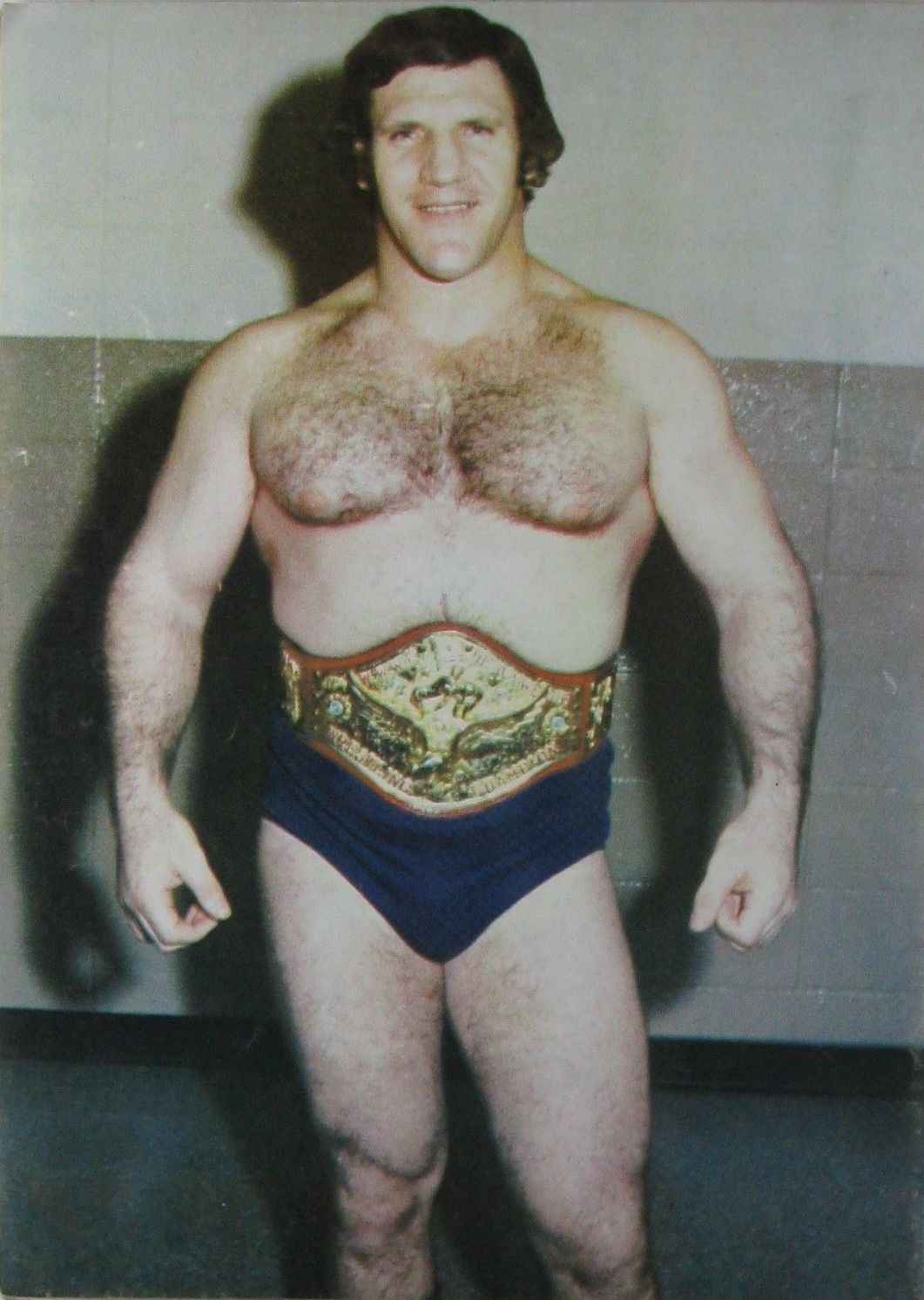
Bruno Sammartino

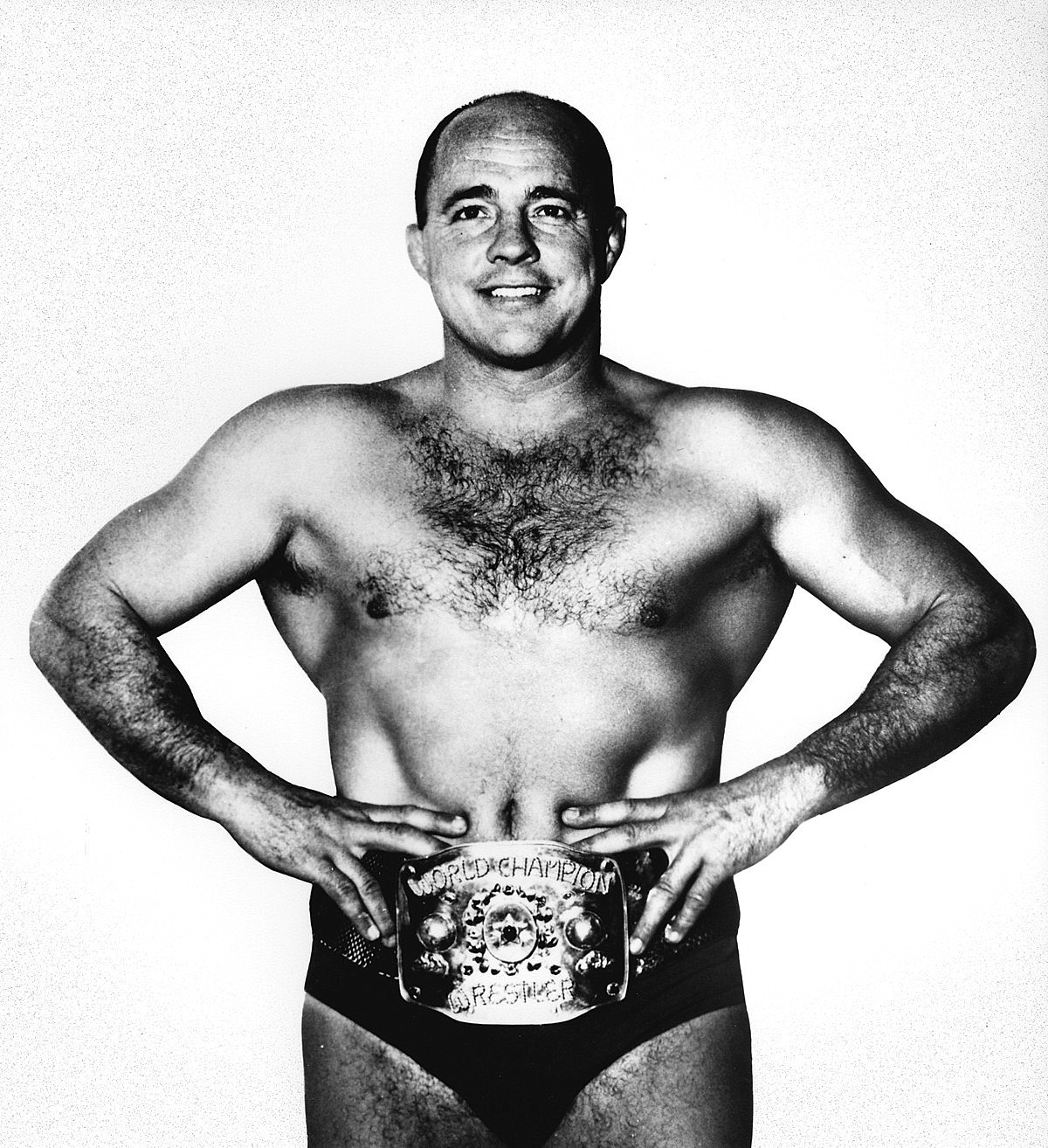
Verne Gagne

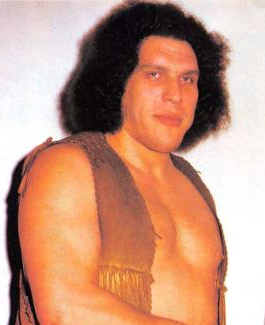
André the Giant

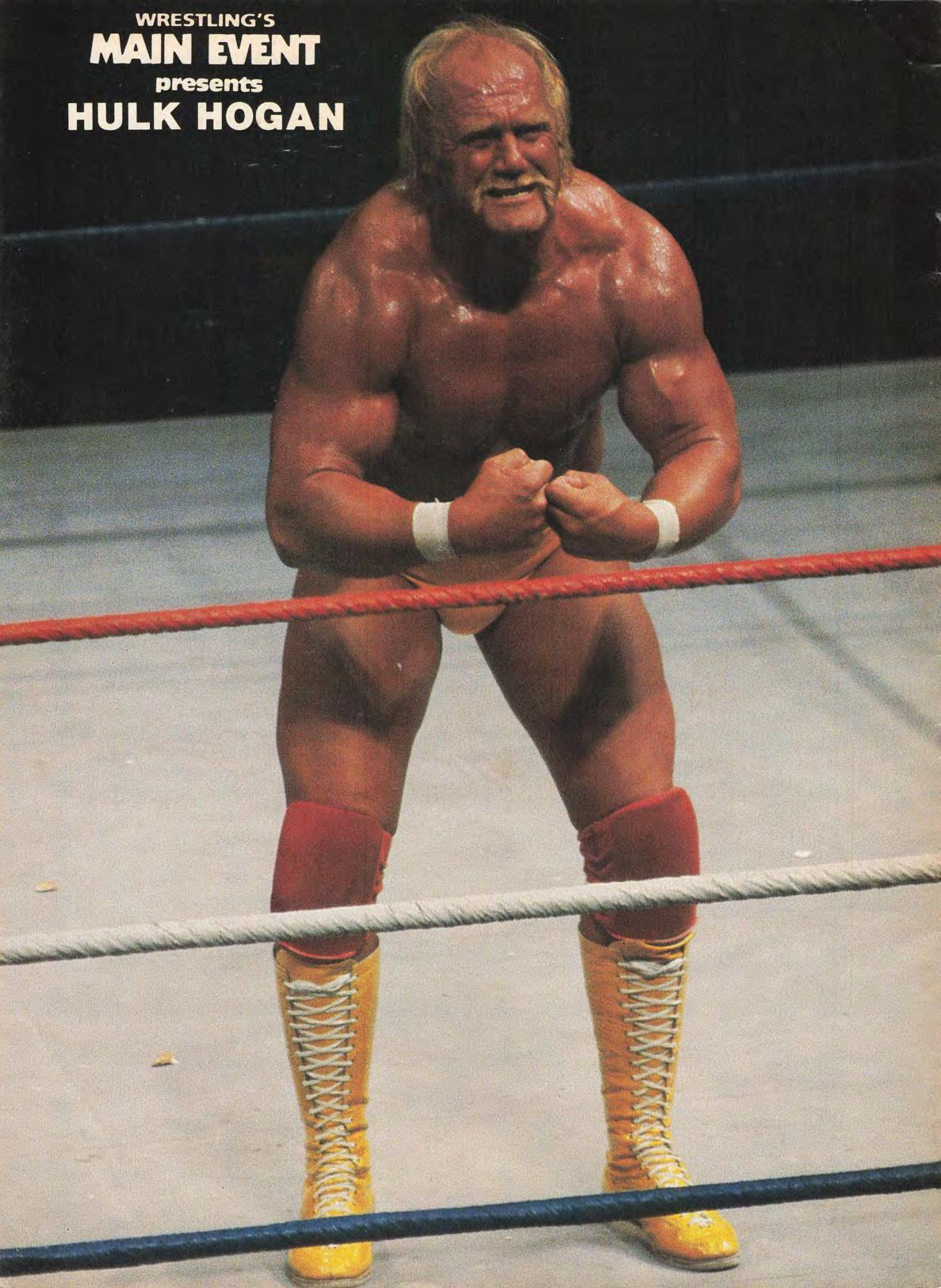
Hulk Hogan

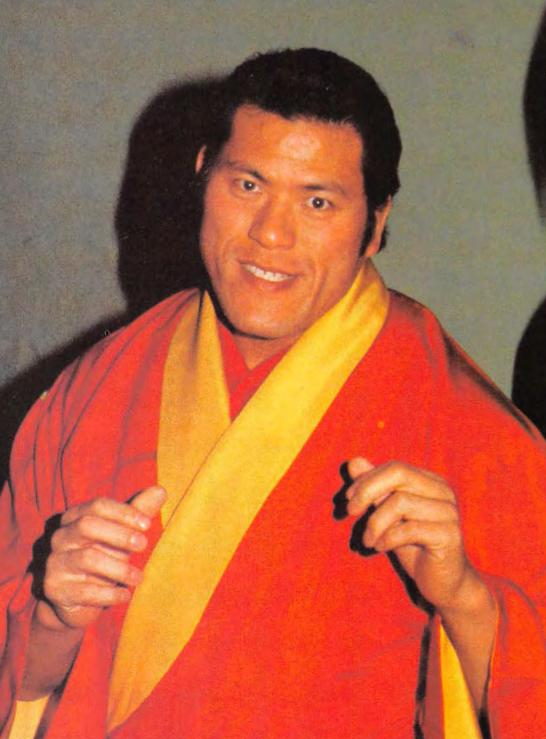
Antonio Inoki

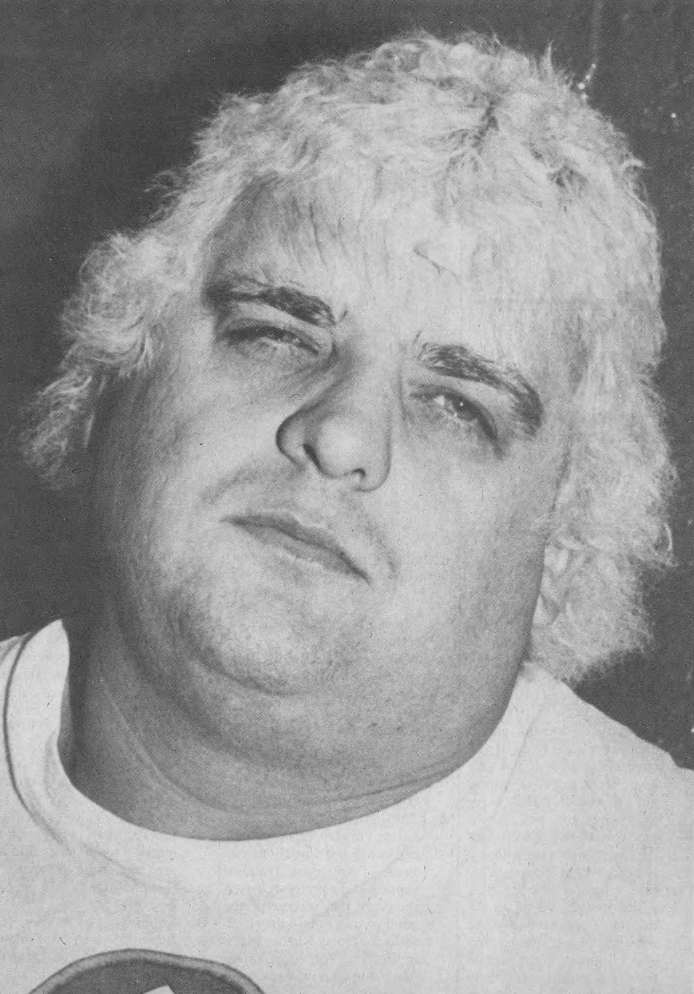
Dusty Rhodes

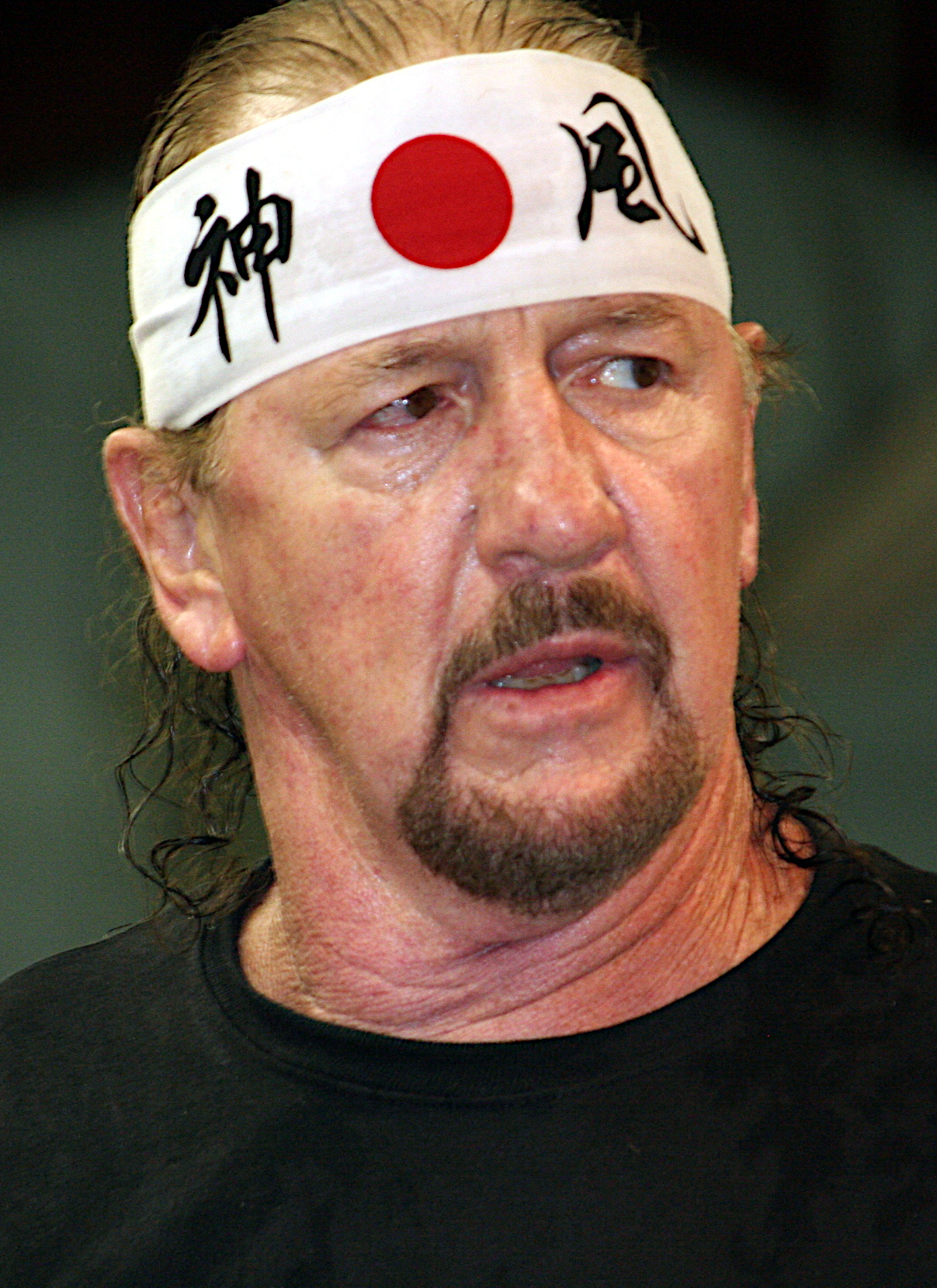
Terry Funk

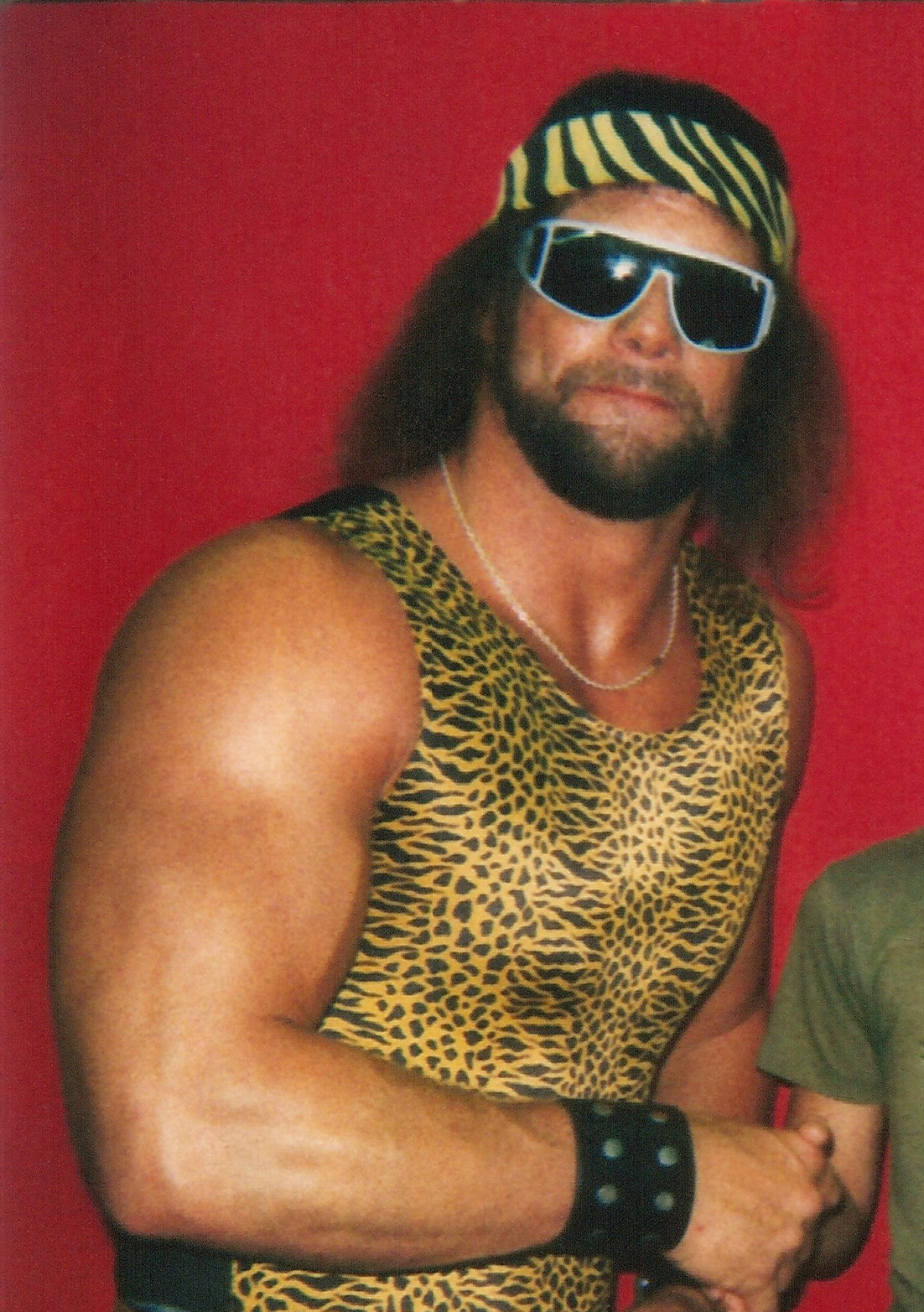
"Macho Man" Randy Savage

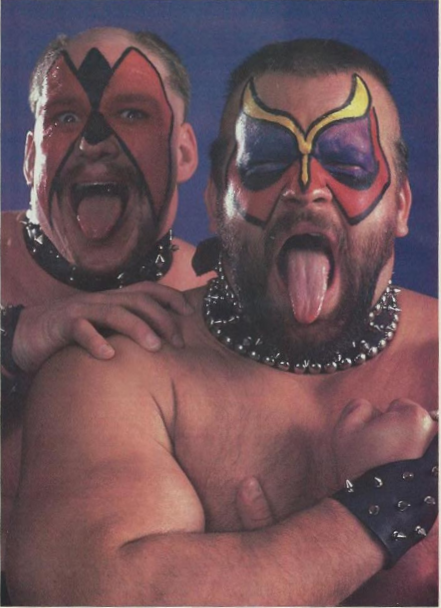
Road Warriors

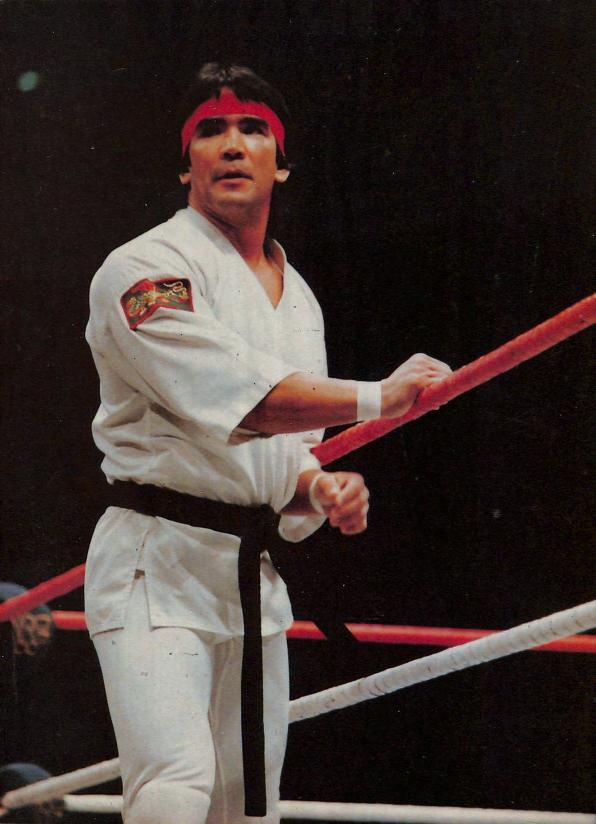
Ricky "the Dragon" Steamboat

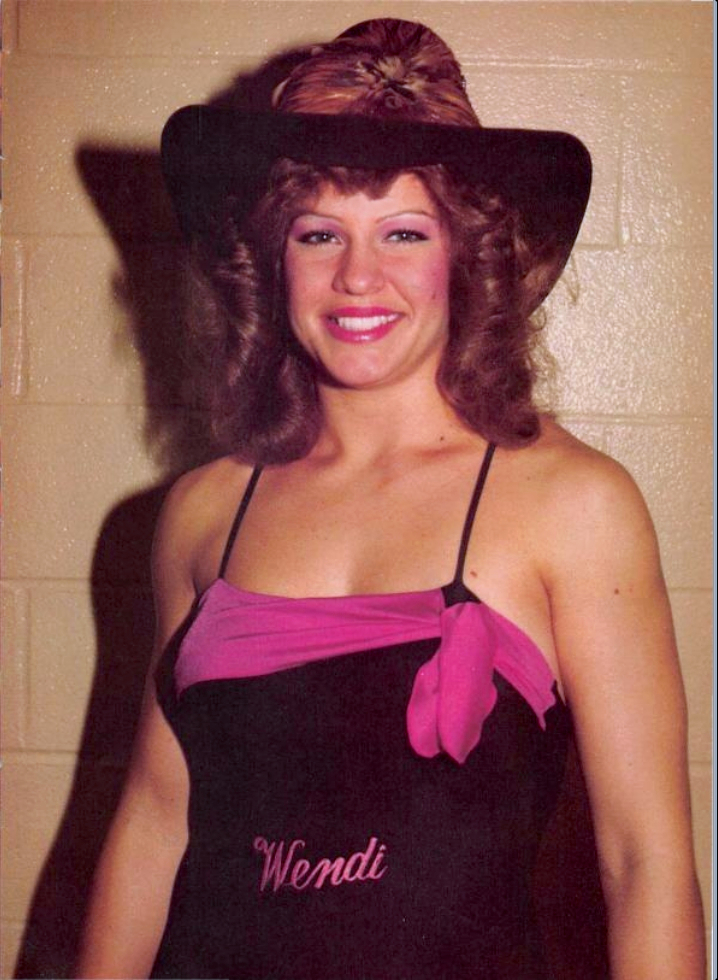
Wendi Richter

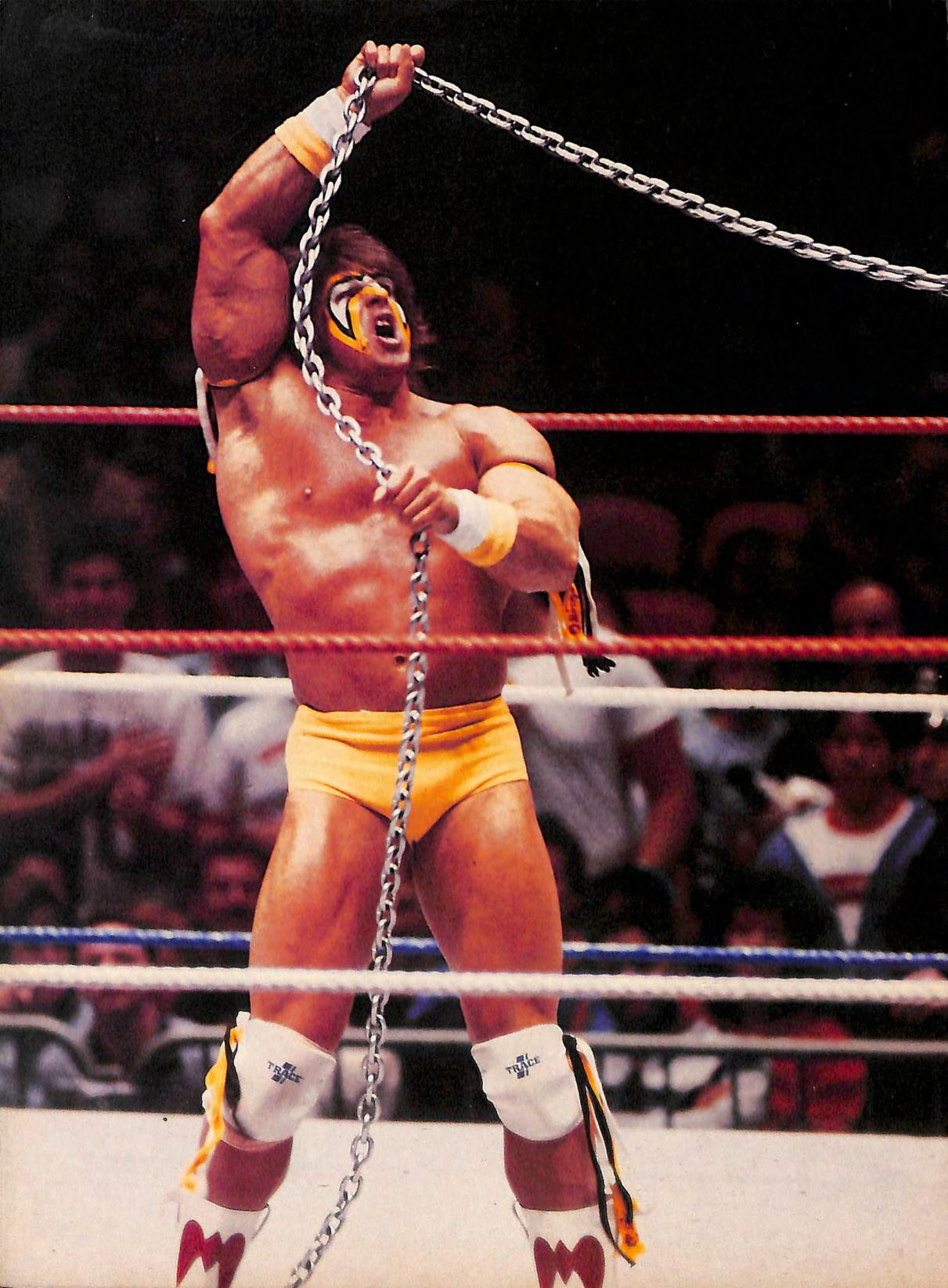
Ultimate Warrior

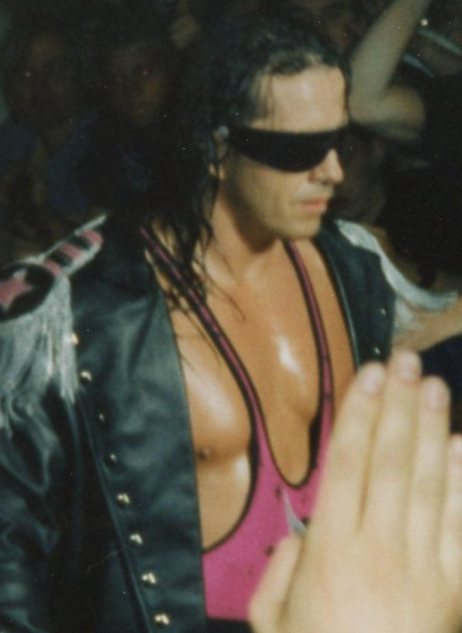
Bret Hart

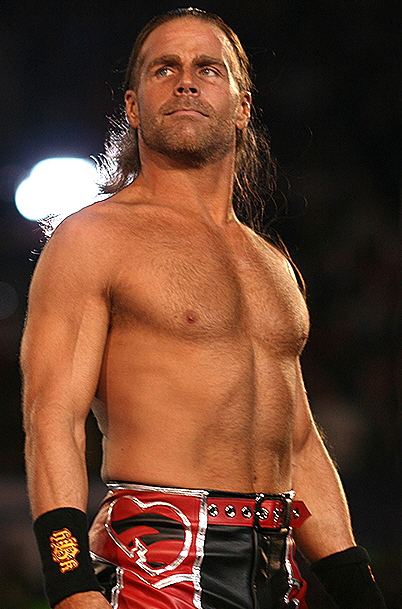
Shawn Michaels

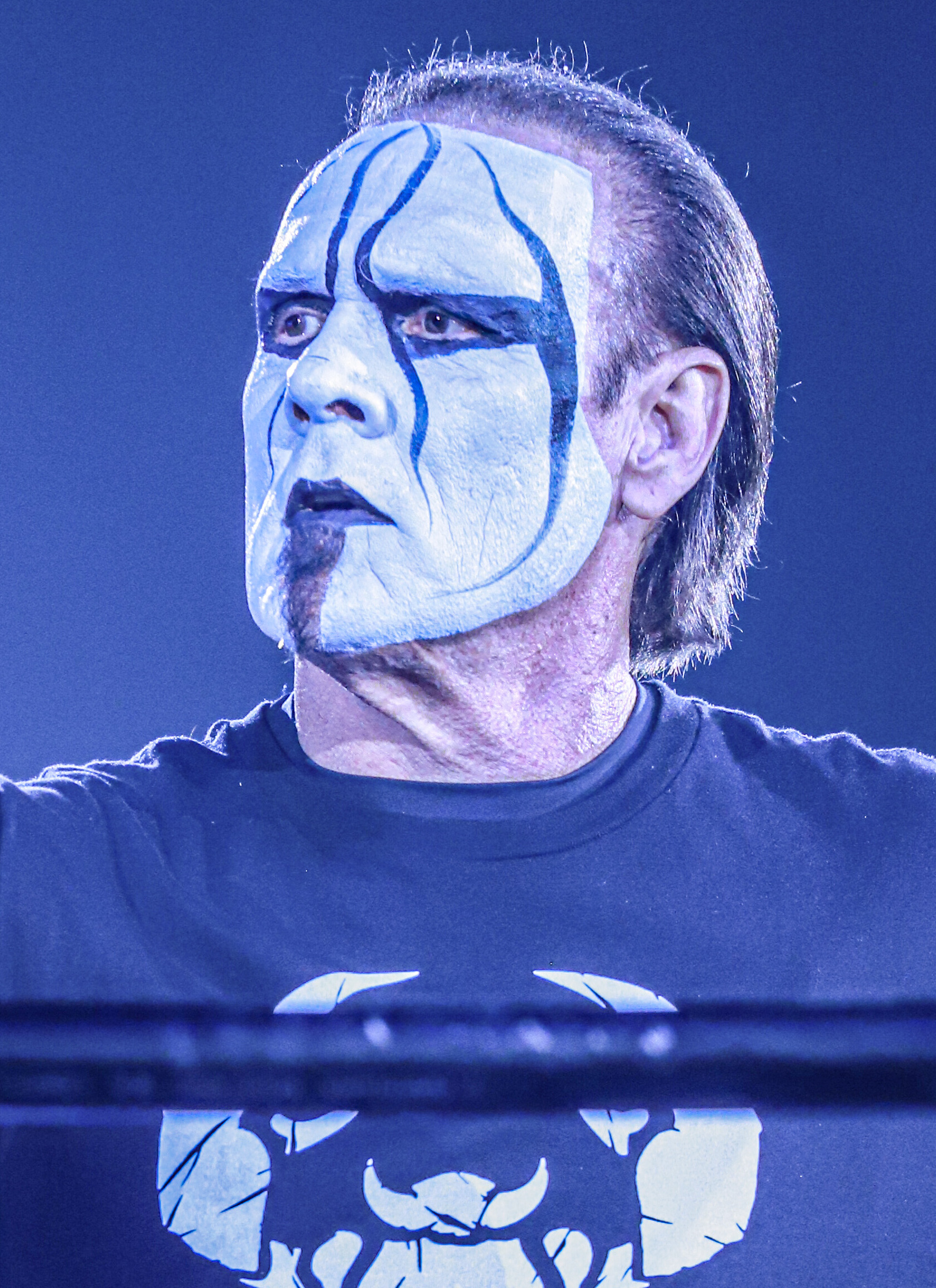
Sting

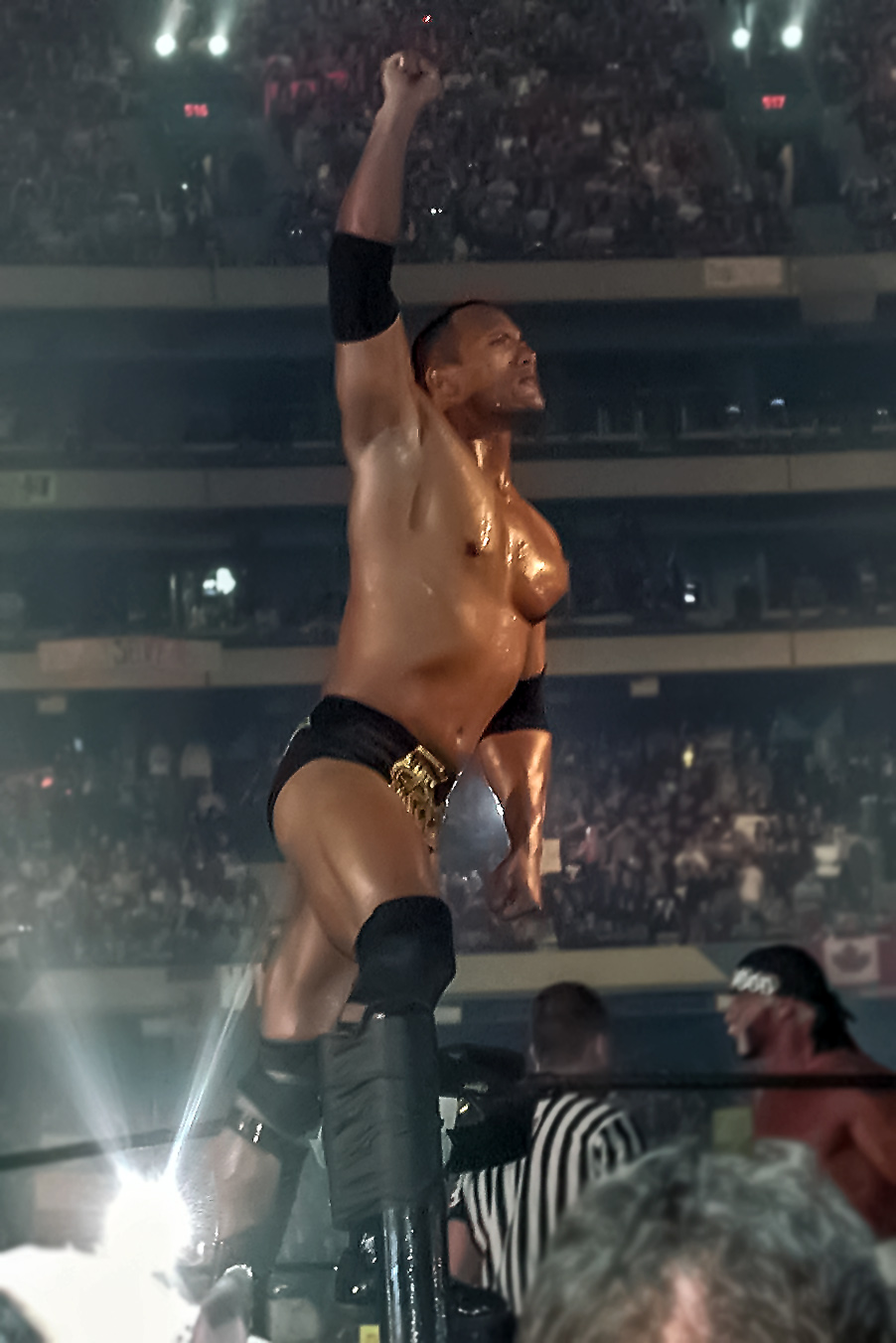
The Rock

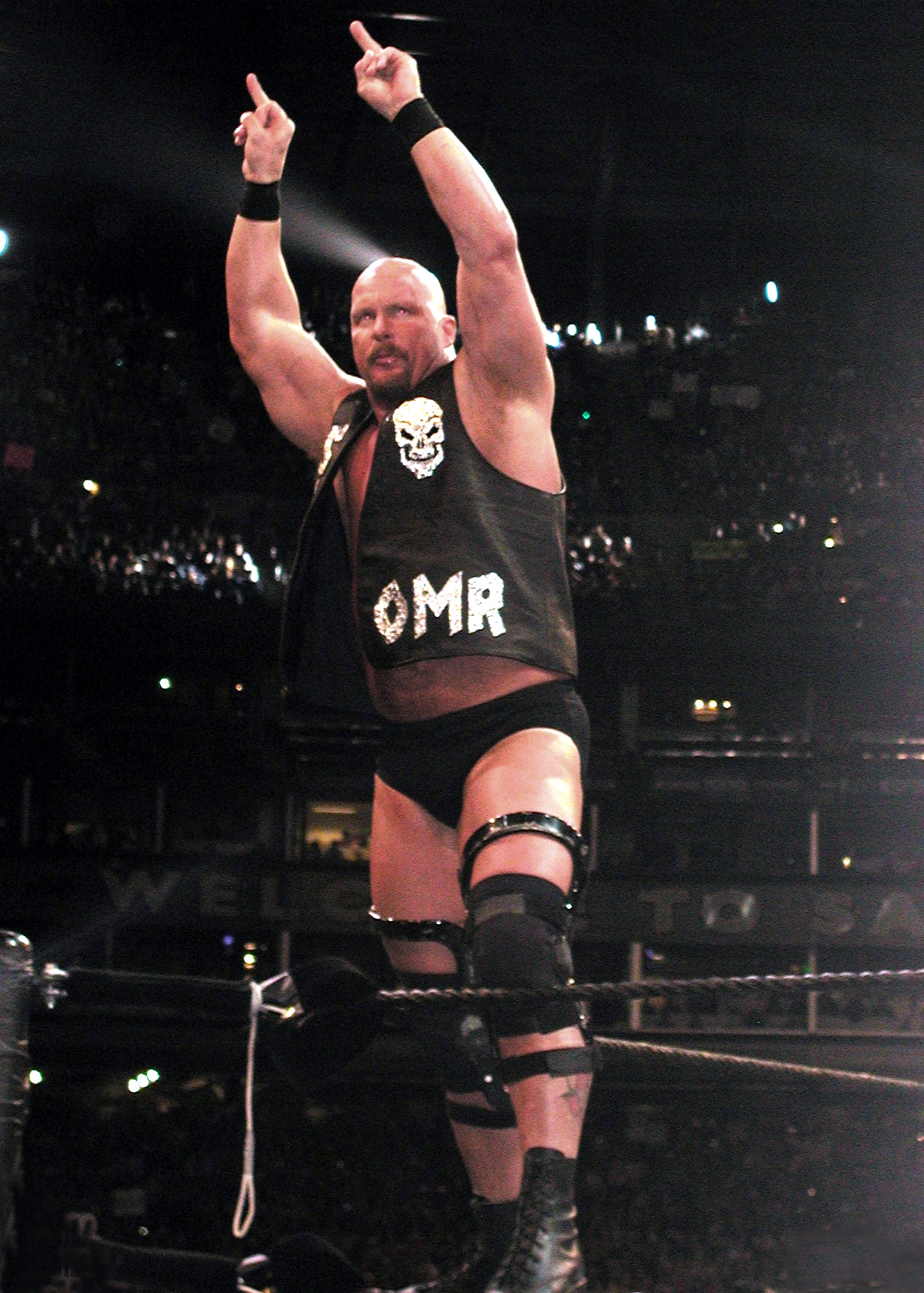
"Stone Cold" Steve Austin

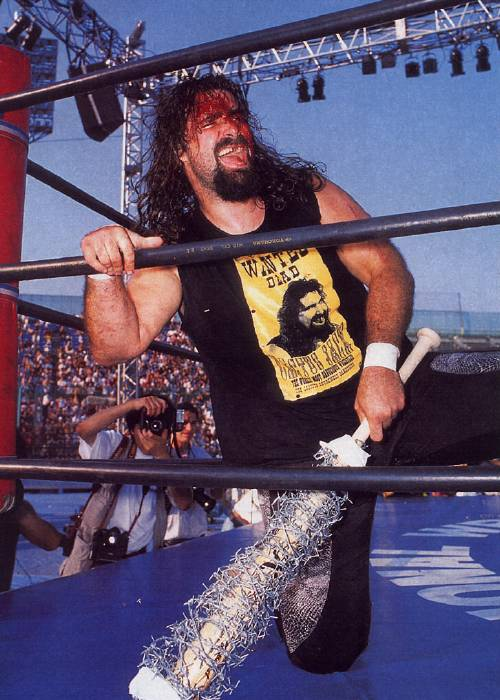
Mick Foley

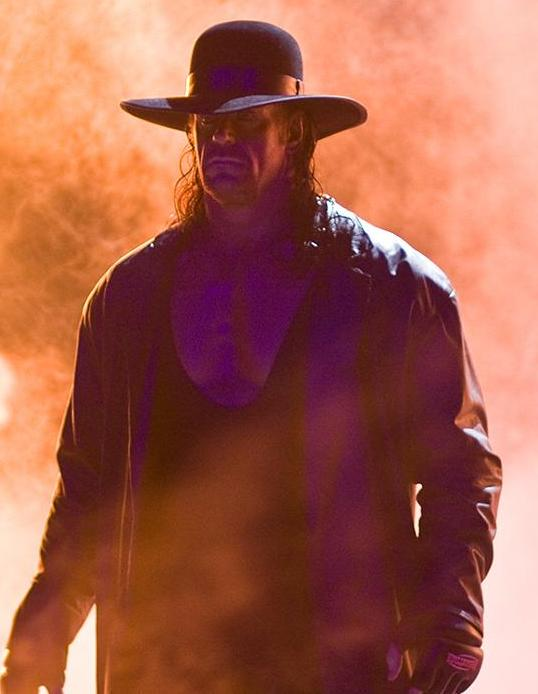
The Undertaker

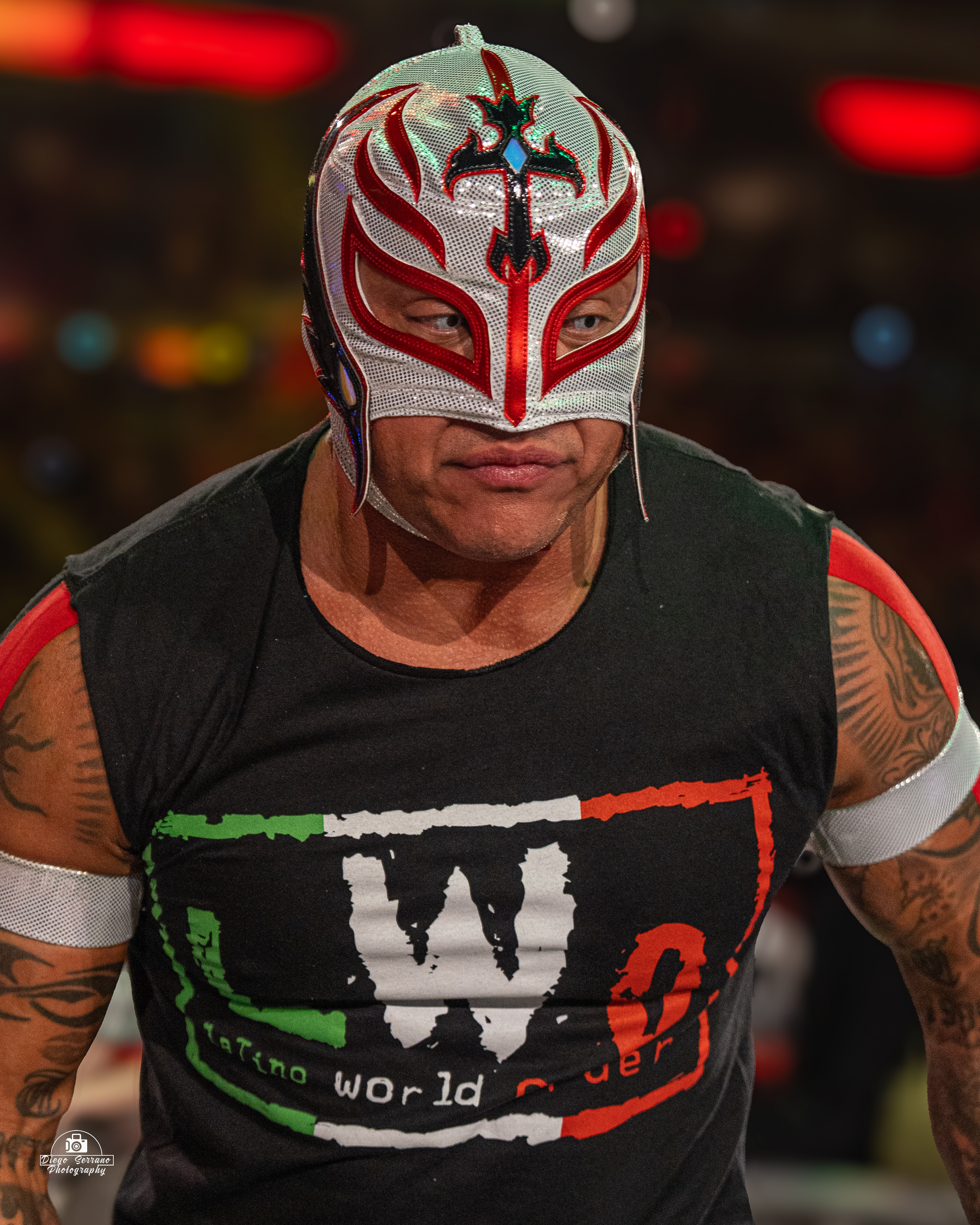
Rey Mysterio

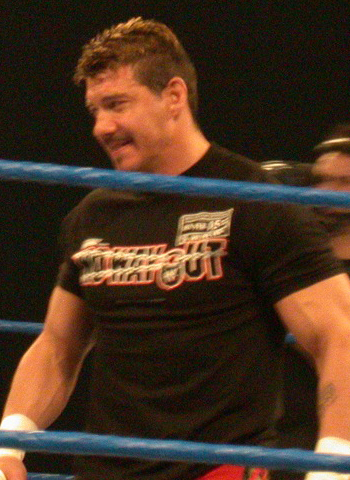
Eddie Guerrero

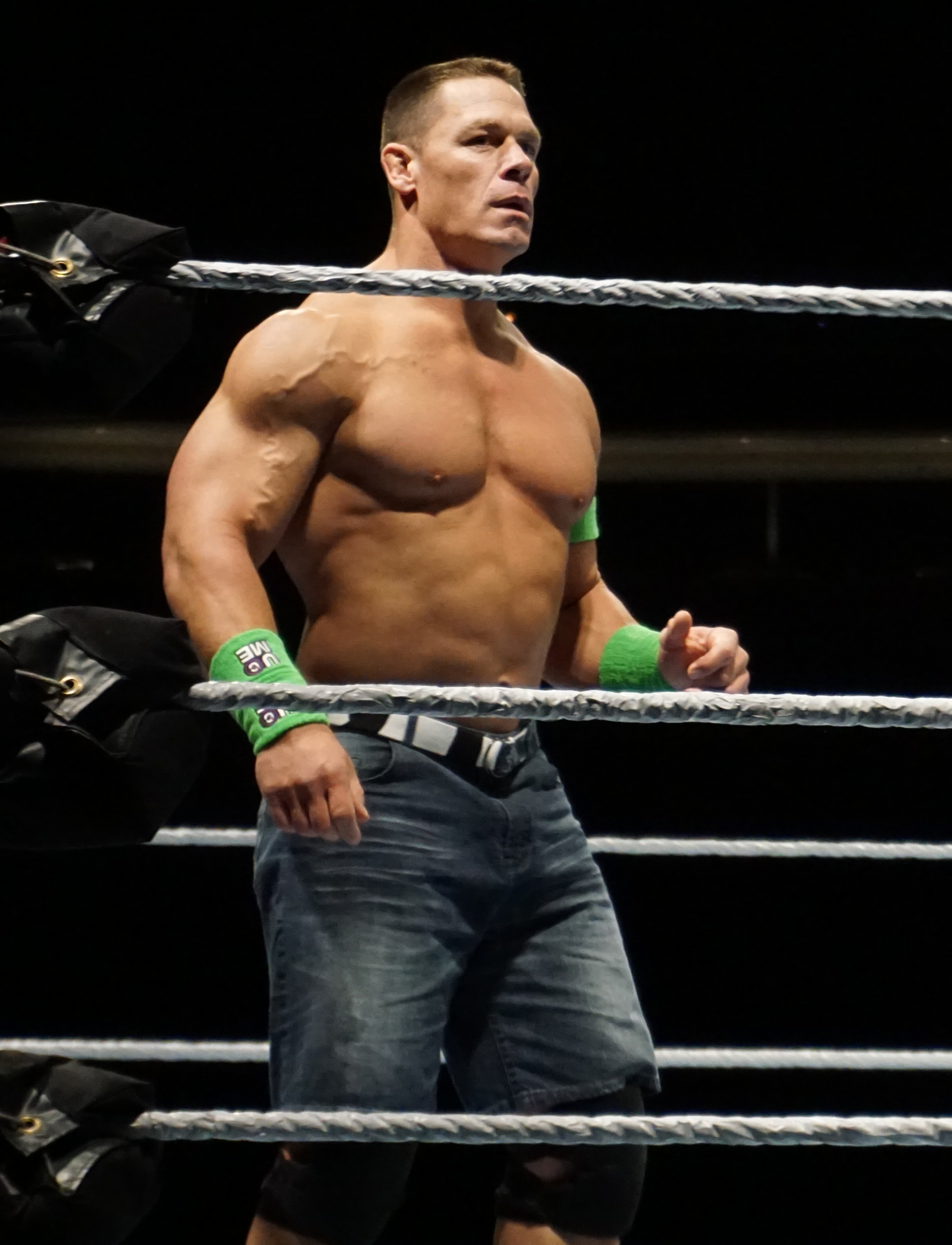
John Cena

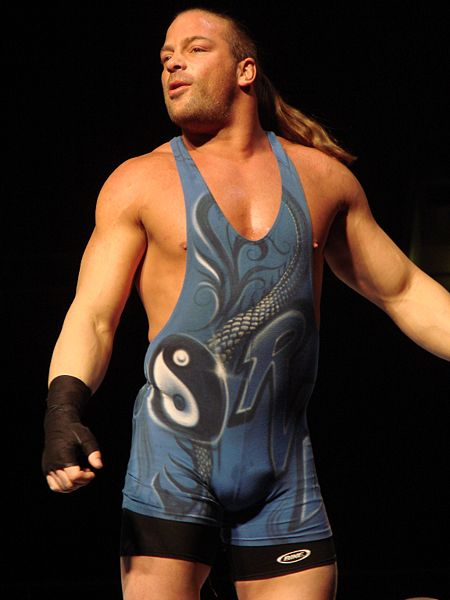
Rob Van Dam

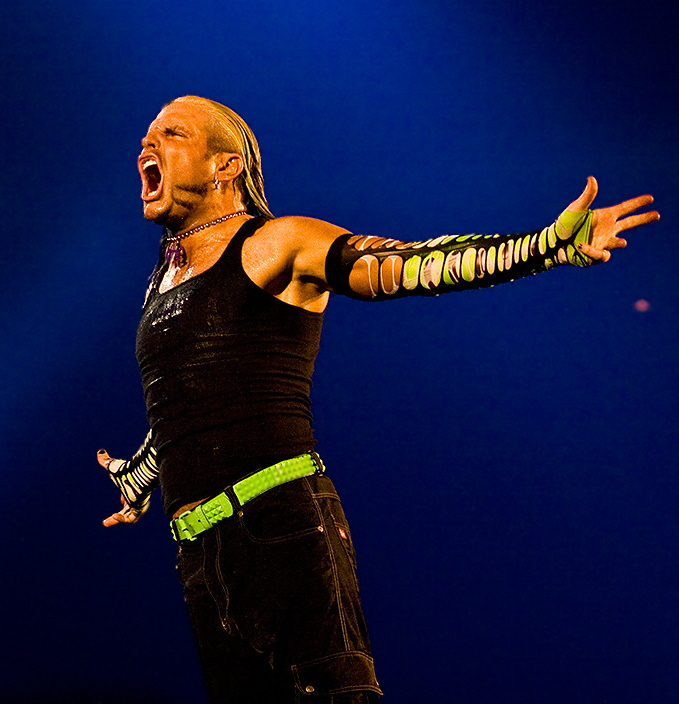
Jeff Hardy

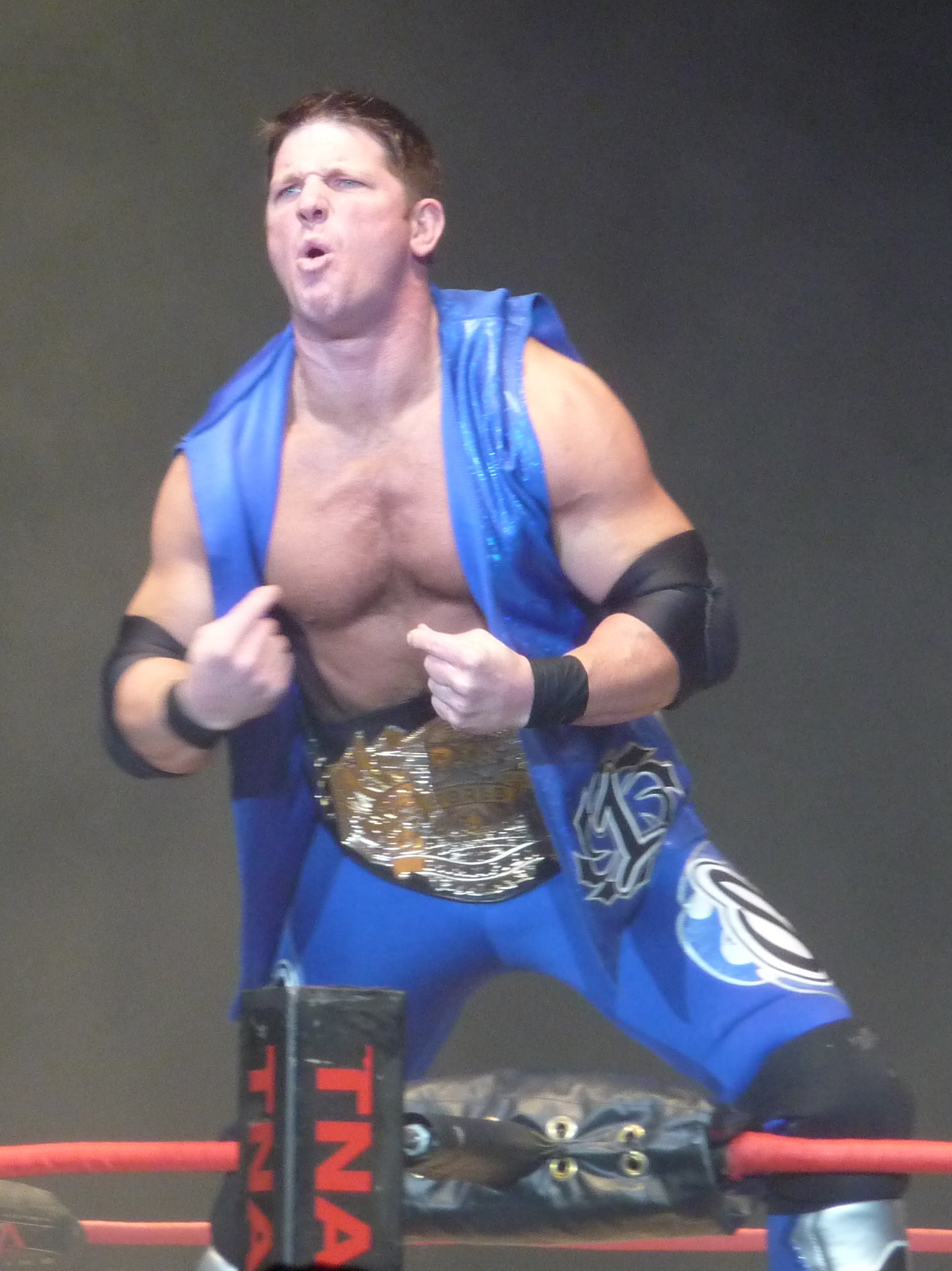
AJ Styles

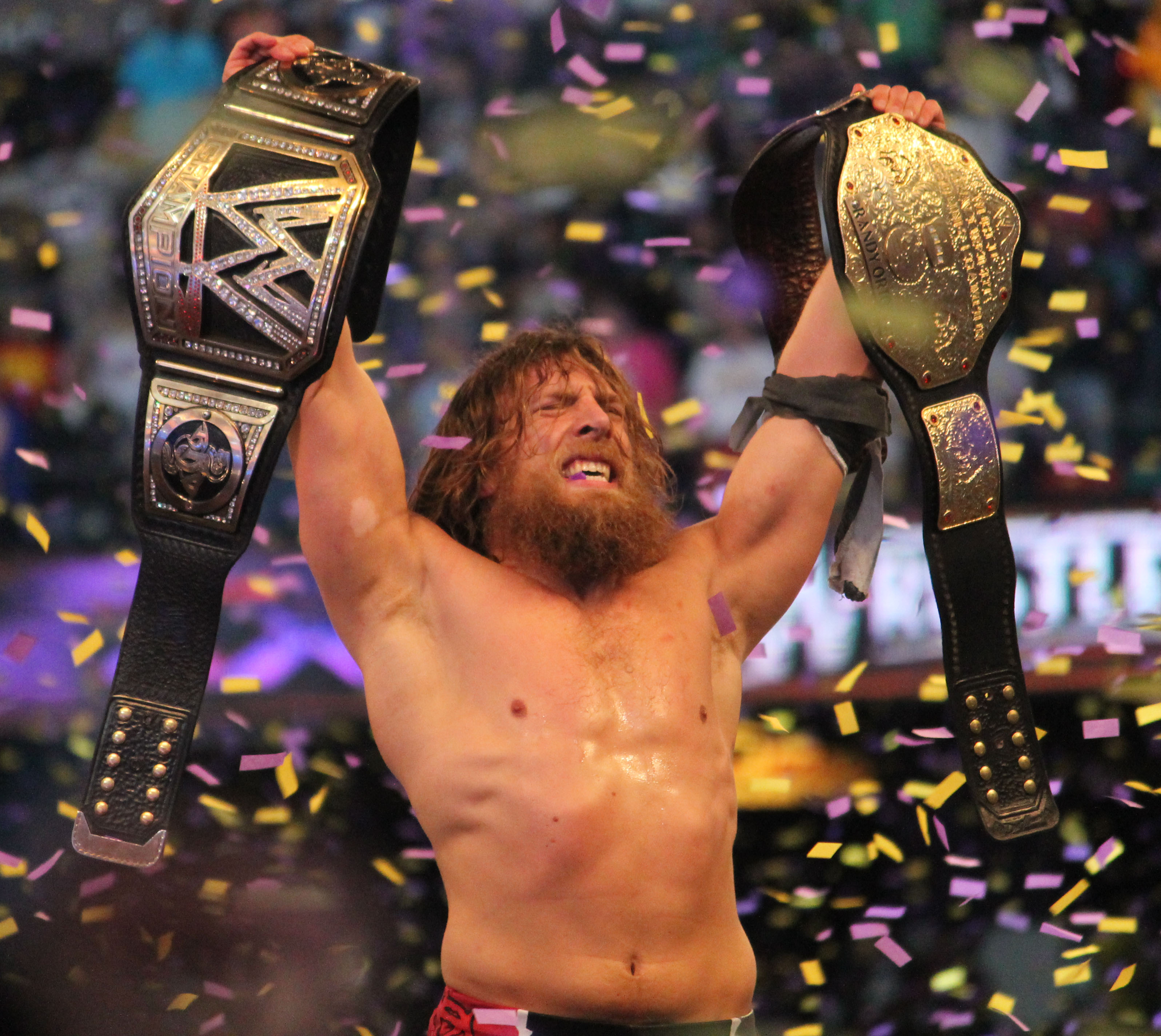
Bryan Danielson / Daniel Bryan

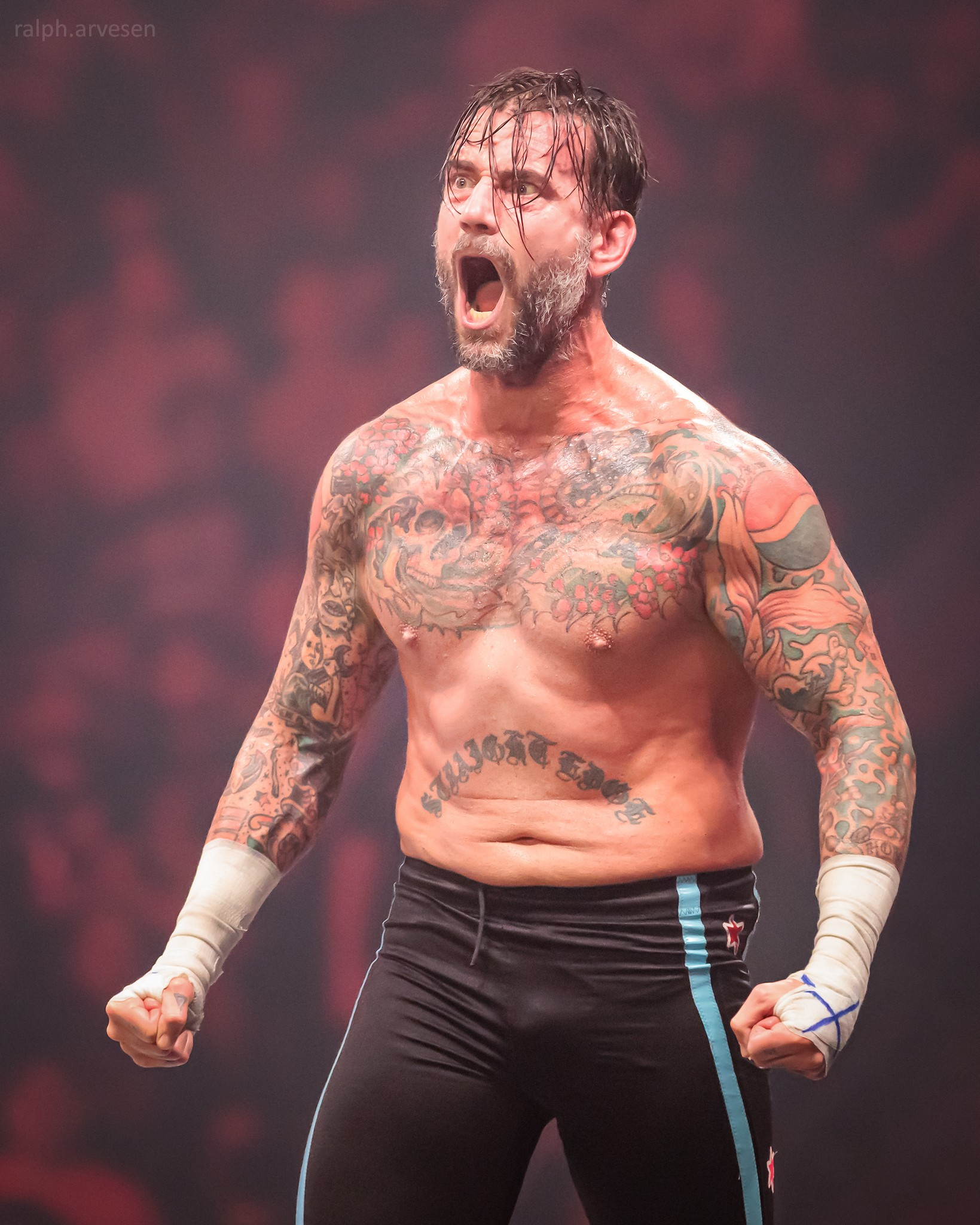
CM Punk

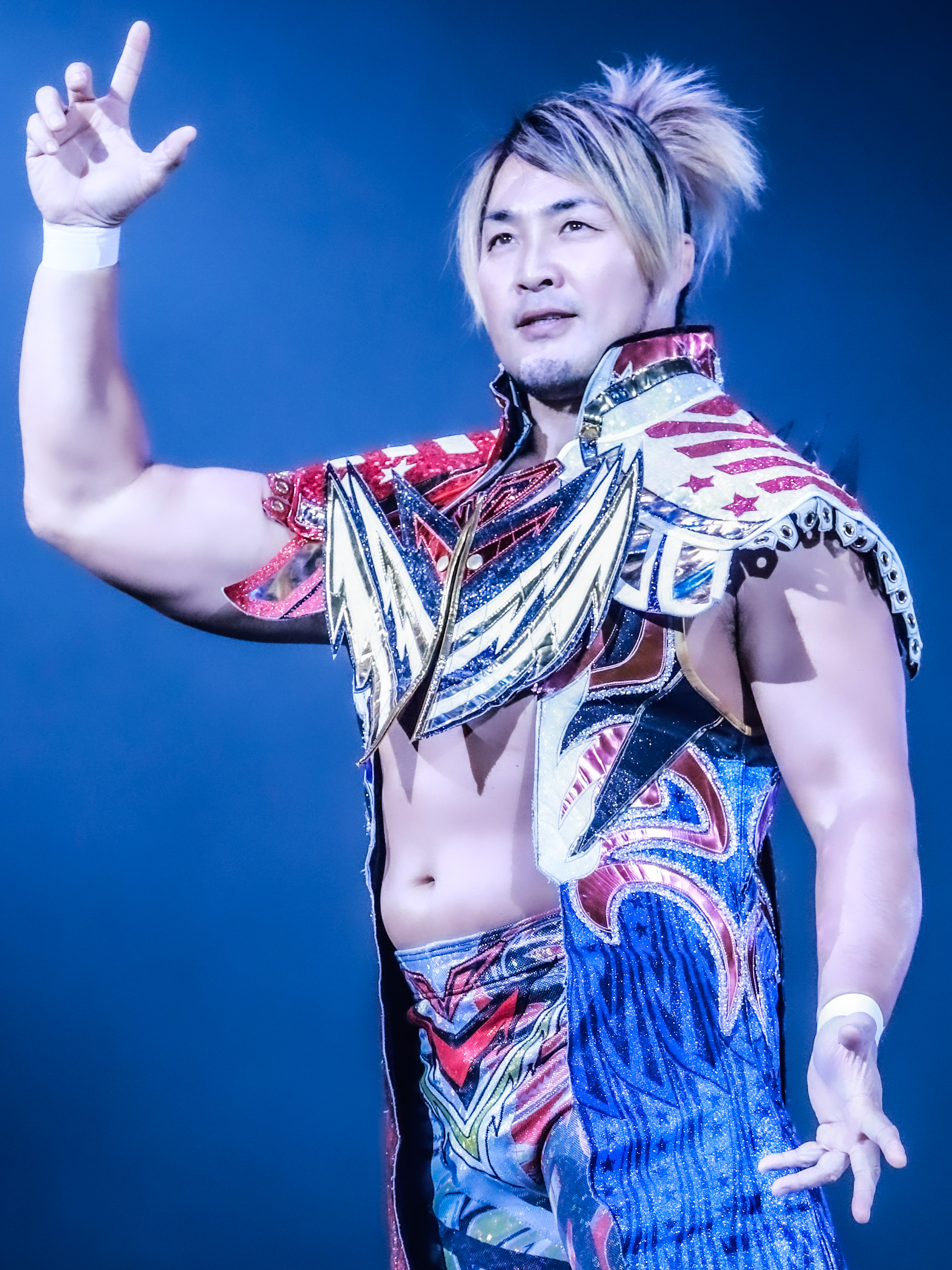
Hiroshi Tanahashi

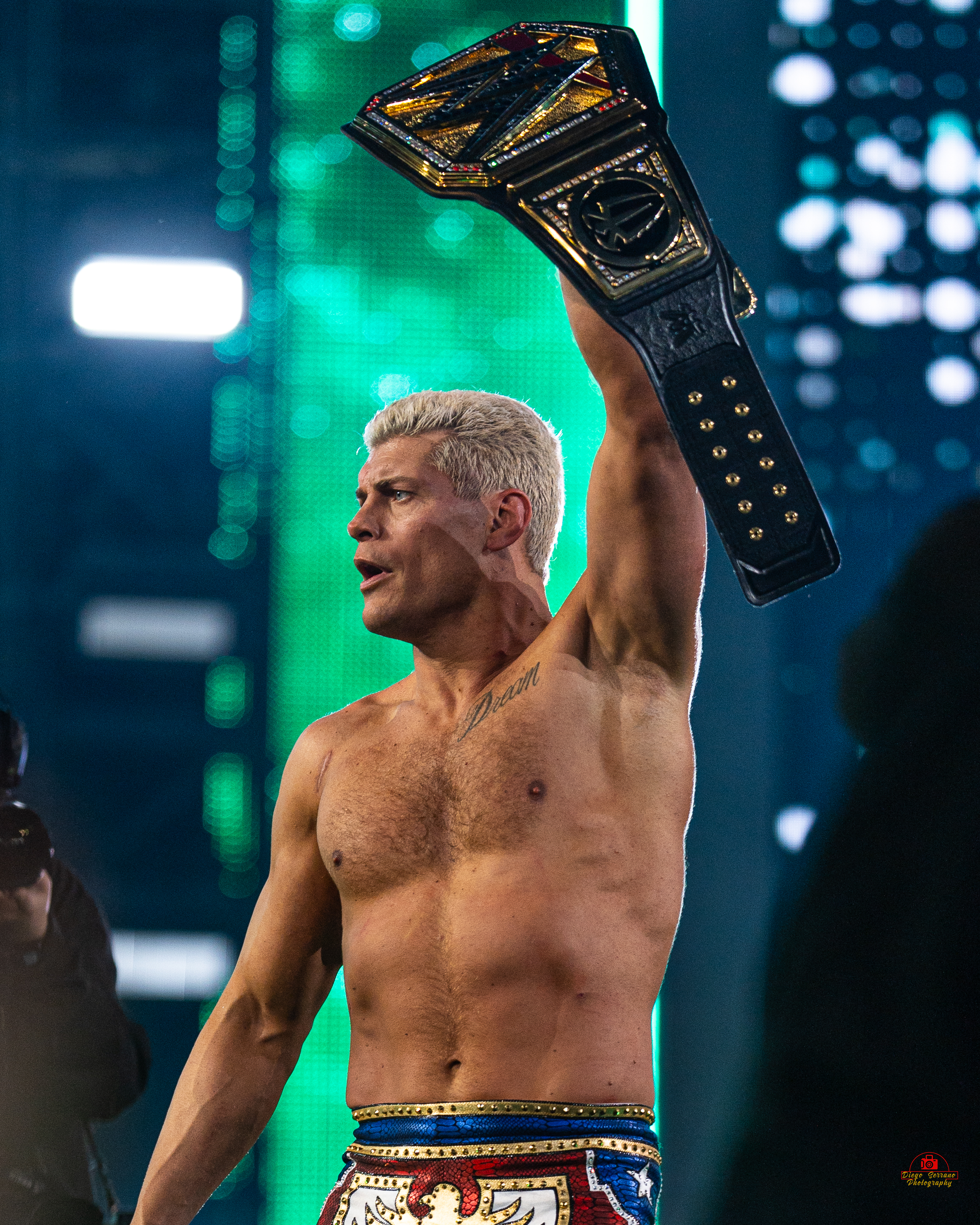
Cody Rhodes

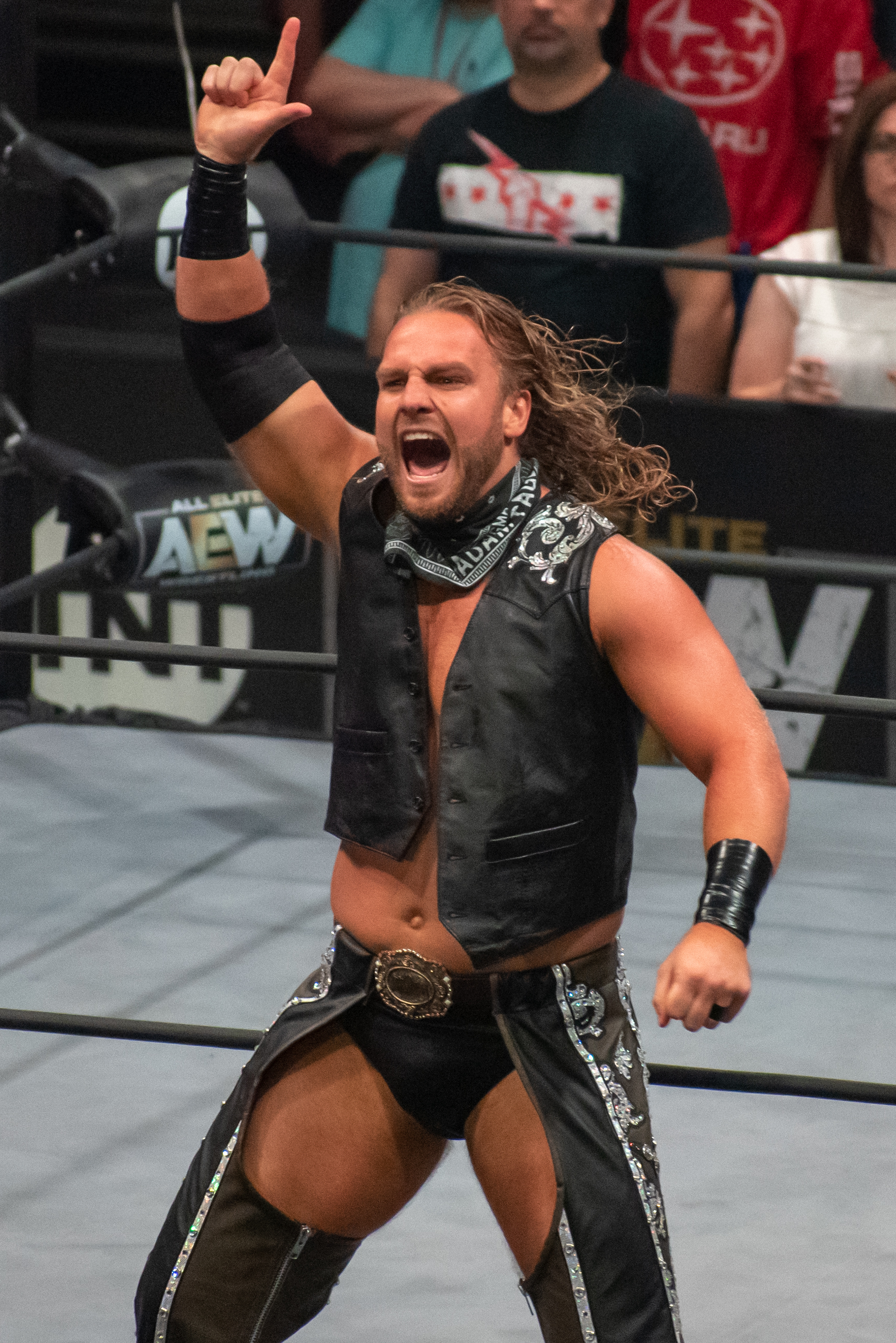
"Hangman" Adam Page
