= SummerSlam (1990) =

World Wrestling Federation pay-per-view event

- Promotional poster
- Promotion: World Wrestling Federation
- Date: August 27, 1990
- City: Philadelphia, Pennsylvania
- Venue: Spectrum
- Attendance: 19,304
- Tagline: The Heat Returns

Pay-per-view chronology
← Previous; WrestleMania VI	Next → Survivor Series

SummerSlam chronology
← Previous; 1989	Next → 1991

The 1990 SummerSlam was a professional wrestling pay-per-view event produced by the World Wrestling Federation (WWF, renamed WWE in 2002). It was the third annual SummerSlam and took place on Monday, August 27, 1990, at the Spectrum in Philadelphia, Pennsylvania. The card consisted of 10 televised matches, including two main events. Ultimate Warrior successfully defended the WWF Championship against Rick Rude in a Steel Cage match and Hulk Hogan defeated Earthquake by countout.

The pay-per-view also included two other title matches. Mr. Perfect lost his WWF Intercontinental Championship to the Texas Tornado, who was a substitute for Brutus Beefcake as Beefcake had been injured in a real-life parasailing accident. In the other title match, The Hart Foundation (Bret Hart and Jim Neidhart) won the WWF Tag Team Championship from Demolition (Smash and Crush) in a two out of three falls match.

== Production ==
=== Background ===
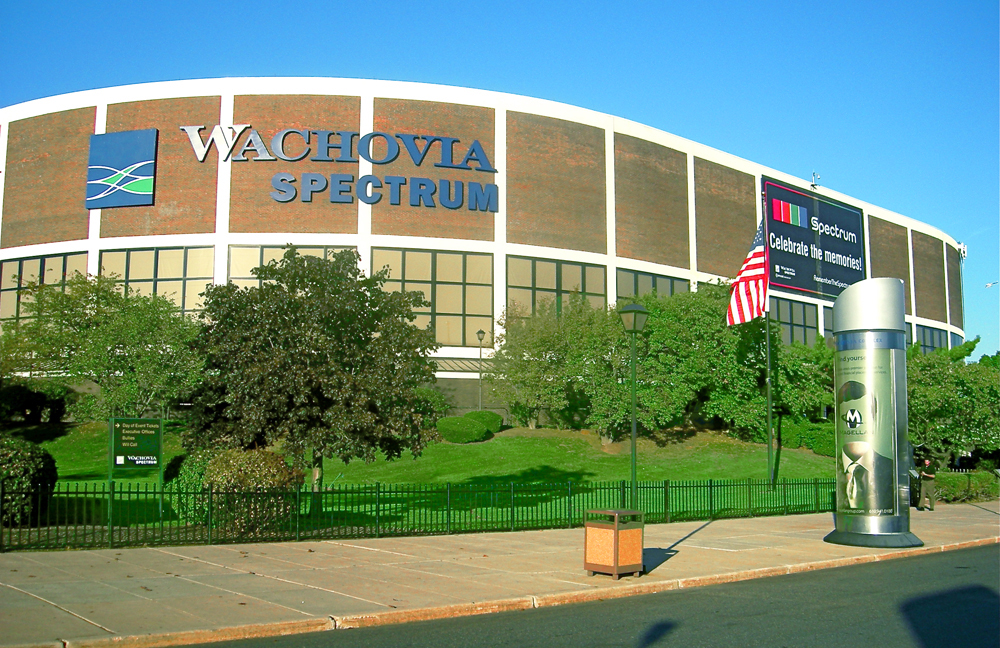
The third annual SummerSlam was held in Philadelphia, Pennsylvania at the Spectrum (pictured in 2008 after it had since been renamed as Wachovia Spectrum).

SummerSlam is an annual professional wrestling pay-per-view (PPV) event produced every August by the World Wrestling Federation (WWF, renamed WWE in 2002) since 1988. Dubbed "The Biggest Party of the Summer", it is one of the promotion's original four PPVs, along with WrestleMania, Royal Rumble, and Survivor Series, referred to as the "Big Four". It has since become considered the WWF's second biggest event of the year behind WrestleMania. The third SummerSlam was scheduled to be held on Monday, August 27, 1990, at the Spectrum in Philadelphia, Pennsylvania.

=== Storylines ===
Paul Roma began feuding with The Rockers (Shawn Michaels and Marty Jannetty) during the July 21, 1990, episode of WWF Superstars. Roma was attacked after a match by Dino Bravo; when The Rockers came to the ring for the following match, Roma accused them of attacking him. The argument turned physical, and Roma was backed up by Hercules. One week later, Roma and Hercules appeared on the Brother Love Show, an interview segment, and formed a tag team known as Power and Glory. A match between the two teams was later scheduled for SummerSlam.

The feud between Mr. Perfect and Brutus Beefcake began at the 1990 Royal Rumble. Beefcake, whose gimmick included cutting his opponents' hair, was wrestling The Genius, Perfect's manager. When he began giving The Genius a haircut, Perfect interfered and caused a double disqualification. Perfect and Beefcake wrestled each other at WrestleMania VI, and Beefcake won the match. Perfect won the Intercontinental Championship on April 23, 1990, in a tournament final. He had caused Beefcake to be eliminated from the tournament by interfering in his match. Beefcake and Perfect had a series of matches at house shows leading up to their planned SummerSlam match. One month before SummerSlam, on July 4, Beefcake was injured while he was standing on a beach and a female friend's knees hit him in the face while she was parasailing. Several bones in his face were legit broken, including his jaw and nose. As a result, the Texas Tornado replaced Beefcake in the SummerSlam match.

At the 1990 Royal Rumble, Sensational Sherri, Randy Savage's valet, appeared on the Brother Love show. Brother Love discussed the definition of a "lady", using Sherri as an example. He then discussed "peasants", bringing out Sapphire, Dusty Rhodes's valet, as an example. Sherri and Sapphire fought, which led to Savage and Rhodes fighting to defend their valets. Rhodes and Sapphire faced Savage and Sherri in a mixed tag team match at WrestleMania VI. Rhodes and Sapphire won the match with assistance from Miss Elizabeth, Savage's former valet. For SummerSlam, individual matches were scheduled, with Sapphire facing Sherri and Savage wrestling Rhodes. Meanwhile, Sapphire had been receiving gifts from an anonymous benefactor.

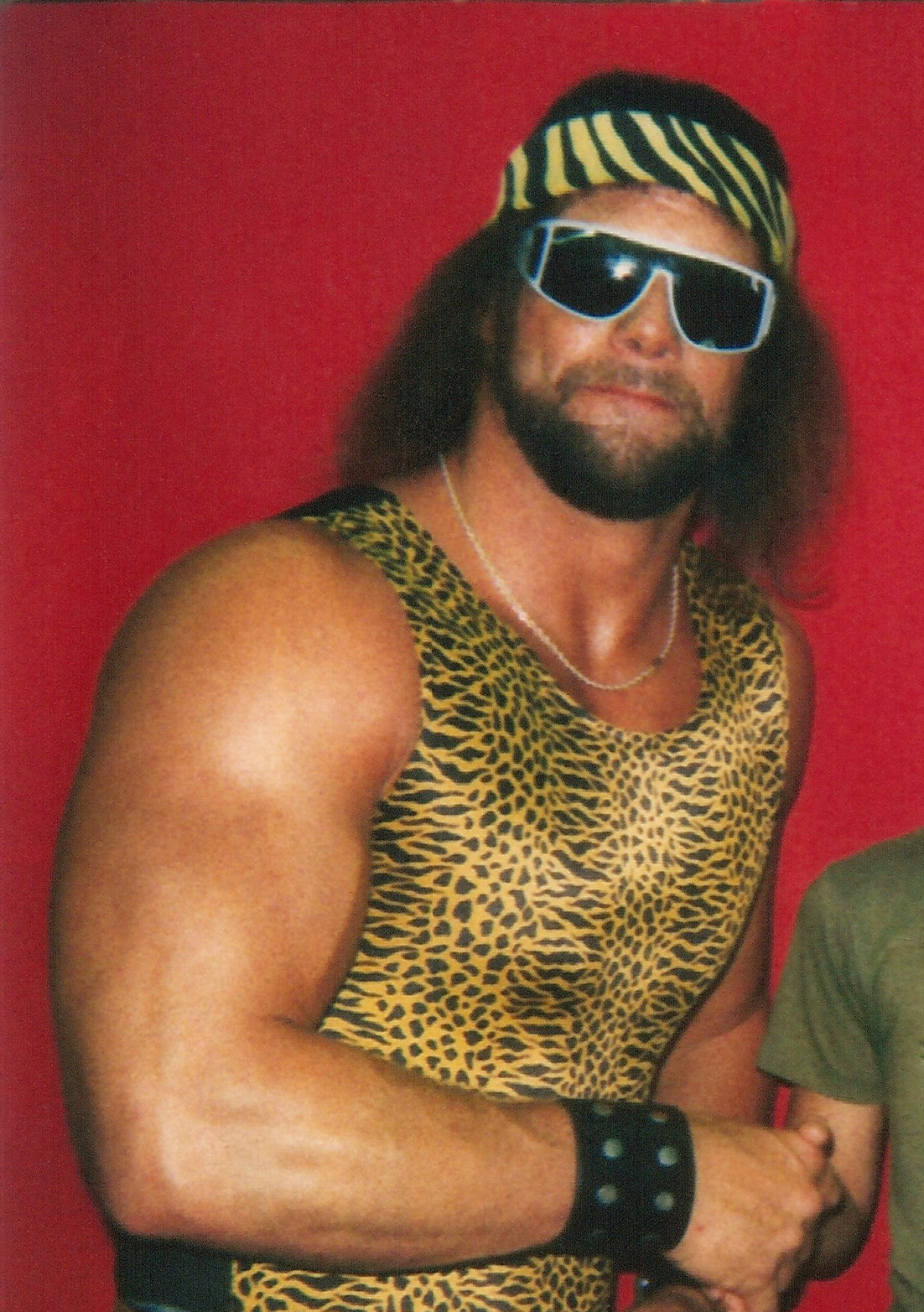
Randy Savage feuded with Dusty Rhodes leading up to SummerSlam.

Tito Santana and Rick Martel formed a tag team named Strike Force in 1987. They won the WWF Tag Team Championship together before Martel abandoned Santana during a match against the Brain Busters at WrestleMania V. This led to a lengthy feud between the two, The team split up as a result and the former partners had a lengthy feud. and a blow off match was scheduled for SummerSlam. Martel was injured prior to the SummerSlam match, so the WWF created a storyline that he was unable to compete because he was participating in a modeling competition in Paris. He was replaced in the match with The Warlord, who had been competing against Santana on house shows since April.

Demolition and The Hart Foundation had faced each other two years earlier at SummerSlam 1988; Demolition had successfully defended the WWF Tag Team Championship. The Hart Foundation duo of Jim Neidhart and Bret Hart later focused on singles wrestling but soon reunited as a team. On the March 31 episode of WWF Superstars they challenged the WWF Tag Team Championship after the WrestleMania. The Hart Foundation faced The Rockers on the April 28 episode of Saturday Night's Main Event XXVI. Demolition interfered, causing a double disqualification. On the July 14 episode of WWF Superstars, Demolition and The Hart Foundation brawled after The Hart Foundation claimed that Demolition having three members was evidence of cowardice. The following week, a match between the teams was scheduled for SummerSlam. The stipulations stated that it would be a two out of three falls match and that only two members of Demolition would be allowed at ringside.

The feud between Bad News Brown and Jake Roberts began when Roberts sent Brown a birthday present on the April 22 episode of Wrestling Challenge. Upon opening the package, Brown found a rubber snake, to which he reacted with horror. On the May 5 episode of WWF Superstars, the two men agreed to a match; Brown later stated that his fear of snakes was cured but was quickly proven wrong. On the July 28 episode of WWF Superstars, a match between Brown and Roberts was scheduled for SummerSlam with the Big Boss Man as a guest referee. Brown commented that he would bring 200 pounds of Harlem sewer rats to counteract Roberts's boa constrictor, Damian.

Nikolai Volkoff began the year partnered with Boris Zhukov in a pro-Soviet tag team known as The Bolsheviks. After Lithuania, Volkoff's homeland, declared its independence from the Soviet Union on March 11, 1990, The Bolsheviks split up. Volkoff became pro-Western and was presented with an American flag by Jim Duggan. They were then booked to face a Japanese team known as The Orient Express at SummerSlam.

SummerSlam Fever results
No.	Results
1	Smash defeated Jim "The Anvil" Neidhart
2	The Texas Tornado defeated Black Bart
3	The Warlord defeated Pez Whatley
4	Nikolai Volkoff defeated Boris Zhukov
5	Power and Glory defeated Mark Thomas and Mike Williams
6	Jake "The Snake" Roberts defeated "Iron" Mike Sharpe
7	Mr. Perfect defeated Ronnie Garvin
8	The Orient Express defeated Sonny Blaze and Shane Douglas
9	"Hacksaw" Jim Duggan defeated Earthquake by disqualification

As Hulk Hogan was being interviewed on The Brother Love Show during the May 26 episode of WWF Superstars, he was attacked by Earthquake. Earthquake hit Hogan with a chair and jumped on his stomach with an Earthquake splash. Hogan was taken from the stage on a stretcher. Hogan did not appear on WWF programming for almost two months (in reality, he took time off due to his son Nick Hogan being born and also to film the movie Suburban Commando), as the company teased his possible retirement. On the July 14 episode of WWF Superstars, Hogan revealed that he would return to the ring against Earthquake at SummerSlam. Hogan's friend Tugboat was supposed to be in his corner during the match, but he was attacked by Earthquake and Dino Bravo on the August 18 episode of WWF Superstars and received two Earthquake splashes before being rescued by the Big Bossman. Tugboat was carried offstage on a stretcher; his (kayfabe) injuries prevented him from appearing at SummerSlam. Big Bossman replaced Tugboat in that role.

Ultimate Warrior and Rick Rude had been feuding since the 1989 Royal Rumble. The competed against each other in a "posedown" to show off their muscles, after which Rude attacked the Warrior. They faced each other at WrestleMania V in a match for the Warrior's Intercontinental Championship. Rude won the title, but Warrior regained the title belt at SummerSlam 1989. Ultimate Warrior defeated Hulk Hogan for the WWF World Heavyweight Championship at WrestleMania VI; he was forced to give up the Intercontinental Championship, and Rick Rude was named the top challenger for SummerSlam. The match was later scheduled as a steel cage match.

To build anticipation for the pay-per-view event, the WWF broadcast SummerSlam Fever on the USA Network. The show aired on August 19 and included several interviews as well as an appearance by Hulk Hogan and manager Jimmy Hart on the Brother Love show. It also included nine matches that included wrestlers who would be competing at SummerSlam.

== Event ==
Other on-screen employees
Role:	Name:
Commentator	Vince McMahon
Commentator	Roddy Piper
Interviewer	Lord Alfred Hayes
Interviewer	Sean Mooney
Interviewer	Gene Okerlund
Ring announcer	Howard Finkel
Referee	Mike Chioda
Referee	Earl Hebner

Before the pay-per-view began, Shane Douglas defeated Buddy Rose in a dark match. Hercules attacked Shawn Michaels prior to the first televised bout, hitting him in the knee with a chain. The attack was not seen in the live broadcast nor in the Coliseum Video release of the event, but was shown in future broadcasts and releases of the event. Although his partner was unable to compete, Jannetty controlled the beginning of the match, using hip tosses to throw Roma and Hercules. Power and Glory then attacked Jannetty while their manager, Slick, distracted the referee. Although Jannetty was able to mount a brief comeback, Roma and Hercules wore him down and got the victory after performing a PowerPlex—a superplex from Hercules followed by a diving splash from Roma.

The Texas Tornado got an early advantage in his match with Mr. Perfect, controlling the bout with several power moves. Mr. Perfect recovered and used a neckbreaker and sleeper hold to wear down the Tornado. As Perfect was showing off for the crowd, the Tornado attacked him from behind. He wore Perfect down with a clawhold before hitting him with a discus punch to win the match and the Intercontinental Championship.

Sensational Sherri came to the ring for her match against Sapphire, but Sapphire did not come to the ring. As a result, Sherri was awarded the victory by forfeit.

Tito Santana began his match with The Warlord by locking his opponent in a headlock and dropkicking him out of the ring. The Warlord took control of the match when he returned to the ring, using his strength to control the match. Slick, The Warlord's manager, interfered, but Santana regained a brief advantage. The Warlord gained the victory by pinning Santana after performing a running powerslam.

In the two out of three falls tag team match, Crush and Smash represented Demolition against the team of Bret Hart and Jim Neidhart. Both teams relied on brawling tactics during the first fall, which was awarded to Demolition when they pinned Hart after performing the Demolition Decapitation. They continued to wear down Hart until Neidhart tagged back into the match. He and Hart took turns attacking Smash before performing the Hart Attack. Before they could pin him, however, Crush prevented the referee from making a pinfall count, which resulted in a disqualification. During the third fall, Demolition distracted the referee, enabling Ax, their third member, to come to hide at ringside. When Smash was knocked out of the ring, Ax took his place while Smash hid. Well rested, Ax used his power to control the match against Hart. Ax and Smash traded places again, but the Legion of Doom appeared and pulled Ax out from under the ring. With Smash distracted, Hart and Neidhart were able to tackle Crush and pin him to win the match and the WWF Tag Team Championship.

During the following match, a covered cage sat at ringside, supposedly containing 200 pounds of Harlem sewer rats, although the contents of the cage were not revealed. Bad News Brown controlled most of the early stages of his match against Jake Roberts. Roberts attempted to perform the DDT twice, including once when Brown was arguing with special referee Big Bossman, but Brown blocked the move both times. Outside the ring, Brown hit Roberts with a chair while the Big Bossman was not looking. Roberts gained the advantage by punching Brown repeatedly but was kicked to the outside after Brown reversed a DDT attempt into a back bodydrop. Brown hit Roberts with a chair again but was disqualified when the Bossman saw him. Brown tried to gain revenge after the match by attacking Roberts's boa constrictor, Damien, but the Bossman attacked Brown to save the snake.

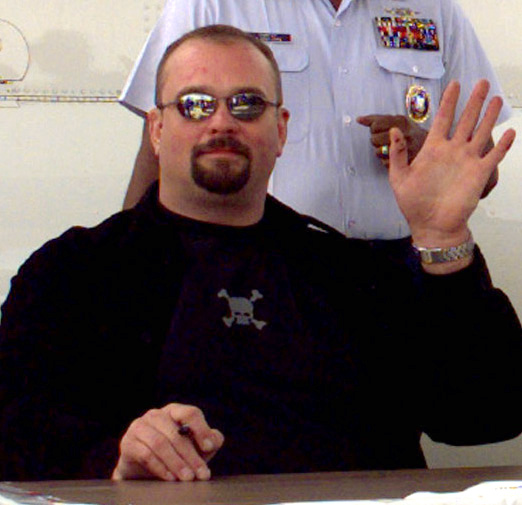
The Big Boss Man did not wrestle at SummerSlam but appeared in two matches.

Sgt. Slaughter was a guest on The Brother Love Show. He presented Brother Love the "Greatest American Award" and claimed that the United States had become soft and weak. He also declared war on Nikolai Volkoff.

Prior to the next match, Duggan and Volkoff sang "God Bless America". They were attacked by The Orient Express (Akio Sato and Pat Tanaka), and all four men fought in the ring. Sato and Tanaka attacked Volkoff while preventing him from tagging Duggan into the match; Mr. Fuji, the manager of The Orient Express, also hit Volkoff with his cane. When Tanaka missed a big splash, Volkoff tagged in Duggan, who performed several clotheslines on Tanaka and Sato. Volkoff and Duggan then Irish whipped their opponents into each other; Duggan clotheslined Tanaka from a three-point stance and pinned him to win the match.

As the match between Dusty Rhodes and Randy Savage was about to begin, Ted DiBiase revealed that he had purchased Sapphire. Rhodes walked down the aisle toward DiBiase and Sapphire but was attacked from behind by Savage. Savage controlled most of the match, and Sherri interfered to help him while the referee was distracted. Rhodes made a brief comeback, but Savage was able to pin him after hitting him with Sherri's purse, which was said to be loaded with a heavy object. After the match, Rhodes chased after DiBiase and Sapphire but was unable to catch up to their departing limousine.

Control went back and forth at the beginning of the match between Hulk Hogan and Earthquake. When Earthquake rolled out of the ring, both wrestlers' corner-men got involved, as Hogan and the Big Boss Man fought against Earthquake and Dino Bravo. Bravo and Earthquake powerslammed Hogan while the referee was distracted, which allowed Earthquake to lock Hogan in a Boston crab hold. After being powerslammed outside of the ring by Earthquake, Hogan tried to lift his opponent but was unsuccessful. Earthquake powerslammed Hogan and performed two Earthquake splashes but was unable to get the pinfall. Hogan recovered and bodyslammed Earthquake. He performed a legdrop on Earthquake before Earthquake's manager, Jimmy Hart interfered. Hogan threw him out of the ring and then bodyslammed Earthquake onto a table at ringside. Hogan got back into the ring and won the match via countout. Earthquake attacked Hogan after the match, but the Big Boss Man saved Hogan by hitting Earthquake with a chair.

Ultimate Warrior gained the early advantage in his steel cage match with Rick Rude. After the Warrior missed a splash attempt, Rude attempted to win the match by escaping the cage. The Warrior stopped him, and both wrestlers unsuccessfully attempted to perform their finishing moves. Rude was then able to perform a Rude Awakening neckbreaker but chose to continue attacking the Warrior rather than escape the cage. Rude performed a shoulderblock and tried to leave through the cage door. The Warrior held him back while Bobby Heenan, Rude's manager, tried to pull Rude out. The Warrior pulled both Rude and Heenan into the cage. He punched Heenan and then threw him out of the cage with an atomic drop. Warrior then knocked Rude down three times with clotheslines and threw him onto the ring floor with a gorilla press drop. Warrior climbed over the cage and dropped to the arena floor to win the match and retain the WWF World Heavyweight Championship.

== Reception ==
The attendance for the event was 19,304, which was the lowest attendance of the first seven SummerSlams. The WWF collected $338,452 from ticket revenue. The pay-per-view buyrate was 3.8, which was down from the previous year's 4.8 but higher than the following year's 2.7 buyrate. Writing for Scott's Blog of Doom, wrestling reviewer Scott Keith criticized the "actual wrestling" and called the finishes "awful", but said the show "had a hot crowd and a double main event that gave the people what they wanted to see", adding that SummerSlam 1990 "is definitely a show that's helpful to have lived through in order to enjoy it on a nostalgic level".

== Aftermath ==
After Michaels took time off to have knee surgery for a legit injury suffered prior to SummerSlam (he noticeably limped to the ring and the pre-match attack where Hercules hit him in the knee with his chain was so that Michaels would not actually have to wrestle), his return saw The Rockers continue to feud with Power and Glory, and the teams faced each other during an elimination match at the 1990 Survivor Series. Power and Glory's team won the match, during which Roma eliminated Michaels after performing a PowerPlex with Hercules.

The Texas Tornado held the Intercontinental Championship for almost three months before dropping it back to Perfect on November 19. The match was aired on the December 15 edition of WWF Superstars. The two men were also on opposite sides for an elimination match at Survivor Series. Perfect eliminated the Tornado with a PerfectPlex, but the Tornado's team won the match. Brutus Beefcake did not wrestle again until 1993.

Dusty Rhodes continued to feud with Randy Savage after SummerSlam. During their match on the October 22 episode of Prime Time Wrestling, Ted DiBiase interfered and attacked Rhodes's son, Dustin. DiBiase and Dusty Rhodes faced each other as part of an elimination match at Survivor Series 1990; DiBiase won the match for his team. The continued rivalry led to a tag team match at the 1991 Royal Rumble that pitted Dusty and Dustin Rhodes against DiBiase and his bodyguard, Virgil. DiBiase and Virgil won the match and then began feuding with each other. Sapphire left the WWF soon after SummerSlam, and Savage stopped feuding with Rhodes in favor of challenging the Ultimate Warrior for the WWF World Heavyweight Championship.

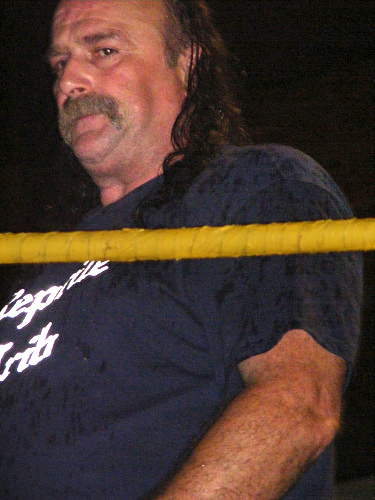
Jake Roberts feuded with Rick Martel after SummerSlam.

After Martel returned from his injury, he was placed in a storyline in which he blinded Jake Roberts by spraying him in the face with cologne on the Brother Love Show. Martel and Santana faced each other on the November 11 episode of Wrestling Challenge, and Roberts interfered. Unable to see clearly, he accidentally attacked Santana but vowed revenge against Martel. Bad News Brown left the WWF after SummerSlam, citing broken promises as his reason.

The Hart Foundation held the WWF Tag Team Championship for almost seven months before dropping the title belts to The Nasty Boys on March 24, 1991, at Wrestlemania VII. Demolition feuded with the Legion of Doom, including several six-man matches in which Ultimate Warrior sided with the Legion of Doom. They also faced each other at Survivor Series 1990 as part of an elimination match. During the match, Smash, Crush, and both members of the Legion of Doom were disqualified for fighting outside the ring. Demolition was disbanded altogether shortly thereafter, although Smash and Crush continued to wrestle under different gimmicks.

Nikolai Volkoff competed at Survivor Series 1990 in a match that pitted him and his partners against Sgt. Slaughter, Boris Zhukov, and The Orient Express. He was eliminated by Slaughter, who was later disqualified when his manager, General Adnan hit Tito Santana with an Iraqi flag. Slaughter and Volkoff also faced each other on many house shows throughout the second half of 1990. Slaughter won the majority of these contests before setting his sights on the WWF World Heavyweight Championship.

At the 1990 Survivor Series, Hogan and Tugboat were members of the Hulkamaniacs team in a match against the Natural Disasters team, which included Earthquake and Bravo. Hogan eliminated Bravo, and Tugboat and Earthquake were both counted out while fighting each other. The Hulkamaniacs won the match, with Hogan as the only wrestler remaining at the end. During the 1991 Royal Rumble match, Hogan eliminated his friend Tugboat. Hogan and Earthquake were the final two wrestlers at the end; Hogan eliminated Earthquake to win the match. Tugboat later turned heel and changed his name to Typhoon; he and Earthquake formed a tag team known as The Natural Disasters.

Rude left the WWF in late 1990 due to a dispute with the company about money. As a result, Bobby Heenan took his place in matches that had already been booked against the Big Boss Man. Ultimate Warrior held the WWF World Heavyweight Championship until dropping it to Sgt. Slaughter at the 1991 Royal Rumble.

== Home media and streaming ==
SummerSlam 1990 was released on VHS by Coliseum Video on September 27, 1990, in the United States and in November 1991 in the United Kingdom by Silver Vision.

It was first released on DVD as part of Silver Vision's WWE Tagged Classics series on August 1, 2005, where it was paired with SummerSlam 1991. The event was also included as part of WWE's SummerSlam Anthology boxed DVD set, released on August 5, 2008, in North America and on October 6, 2008, in the United Kingdom.

In 2014, the event was included on the WWE's streaming platform the WWE Network as part of its launch and remained on the service until the platform closed in 2026. In July 2026, WWE uploaded the Demolition versus Hart Foundation and the Hogan versus Earthquake matches to their WWE Vault YouTube channel.

As of October 2026, subscribers in multiple territories, including the US, Canada and the UK, can stream the event on Netflix, thanks to the WWE's ten-year agreement with the company.

== Results ==
No.	Results	Stipulations	Times
1^{D}	Shane Douglas defeated Buddy Rose	Singles match	—
2	Power and Glory (Paul Roma and Hercules) (with Slick) defeated The Rockers (Shawn Michaels and Marty Jannetty)	Tag team match	6:00
3	The Texas Tornado defeated Mr. Perfect (c) (with Bobby Heenan)	Singles match for the WWF Intercontinental Championship	5:15
4	Queen Sherri defeated Sapphire by forfeit	Singles match	—
5	The Warlord (with Slick) defeated Tito Santana	Singles match	5:28
6	The Hart Foundation (Bret Hart and Jim Neidhart) defeated Demolition (Smash and Crush) (c) by 2–1	Tag Team Two-out-of-three falls match for the WWF Tag Team Championship	14:24
7	Jake Roberts defeated Bad News Brown by disqualification	Singles match with Big Boss Man as special guest referee	4:44
8	Jim Duggan and Nikolai Volkoff defeated The Orient Express (Sato and Tanaka) (with Mr. Fuji)	Tag team match	3:22
9	Randy Savage (with Queen Sherri) defeated Dusty Rhodes	Singles match	2:15
10	Hulk Hogan (with Big Boss Man) defeated Earthquake (with Jimmy Hart and Dino Bravo) by countout	Singles match	13:16
11	Ultimate Warrior (c) defeated Rick Rude (with Bobby Heenan) by escaping the cage	Steel Cage match for the WWF Championship	10:05
(c) / – the champion(s) heading into the match; D / – this was a dark match

== See also ==
- 1990 in professional wrestling
