= SummerSlam (1989) =

World Wrestling Federation pay-per-view event

- Promotional poster showcasing Hulk Hogan, Brutus Beefcake, Randy Savage, Zeus, and Sensational Sherri
- Promotion: World Wrestling Federation
- Date: August 28, 1989
- City: East Rutherford, New Jersey
- Venue: Brendan Byrne Arena
- Attendance: 20,000
- Tagline: Feel the Heat!

Pay-per-view chronology
← Previous; WrestleMania V	Next → Survivor Series

SummerSlam chronology
← Previous; 1988	Next → 1990

The 1989 SummerSlam was a professional wrestling pay-per-view (PPV) event produced by the World Wrestling Federation (WWF, renamed WWE in 2002). It was the second annual SummerSlam and took place on Monday, August 28, 1989, at the Brendan Byrne Arena in East Rutherford, New Jersey. Ten matches were contested at the event, including one dark match held before the live broadcast.

The main event was a tag team match between the team of WWF Champion Hulk Hogan and Brutus "The Barber" Beefcake (who would later be known as The Mega-Maniacs in the 1990s) and the team of "Macho Man" Randy Savage and Zeus. The main matches on the undercard were Ted DiBiase versus Jimmy Snuka, Ultimate Warrior versus Rick Rude for the WWF Intercontinental Heavyweight Championship, and Jim Duggan and Demolition (Ax and Smash) versus André the Giant and The Twin Towers (Akeem and Big Boss Man).

== Production ==
=== Background ===
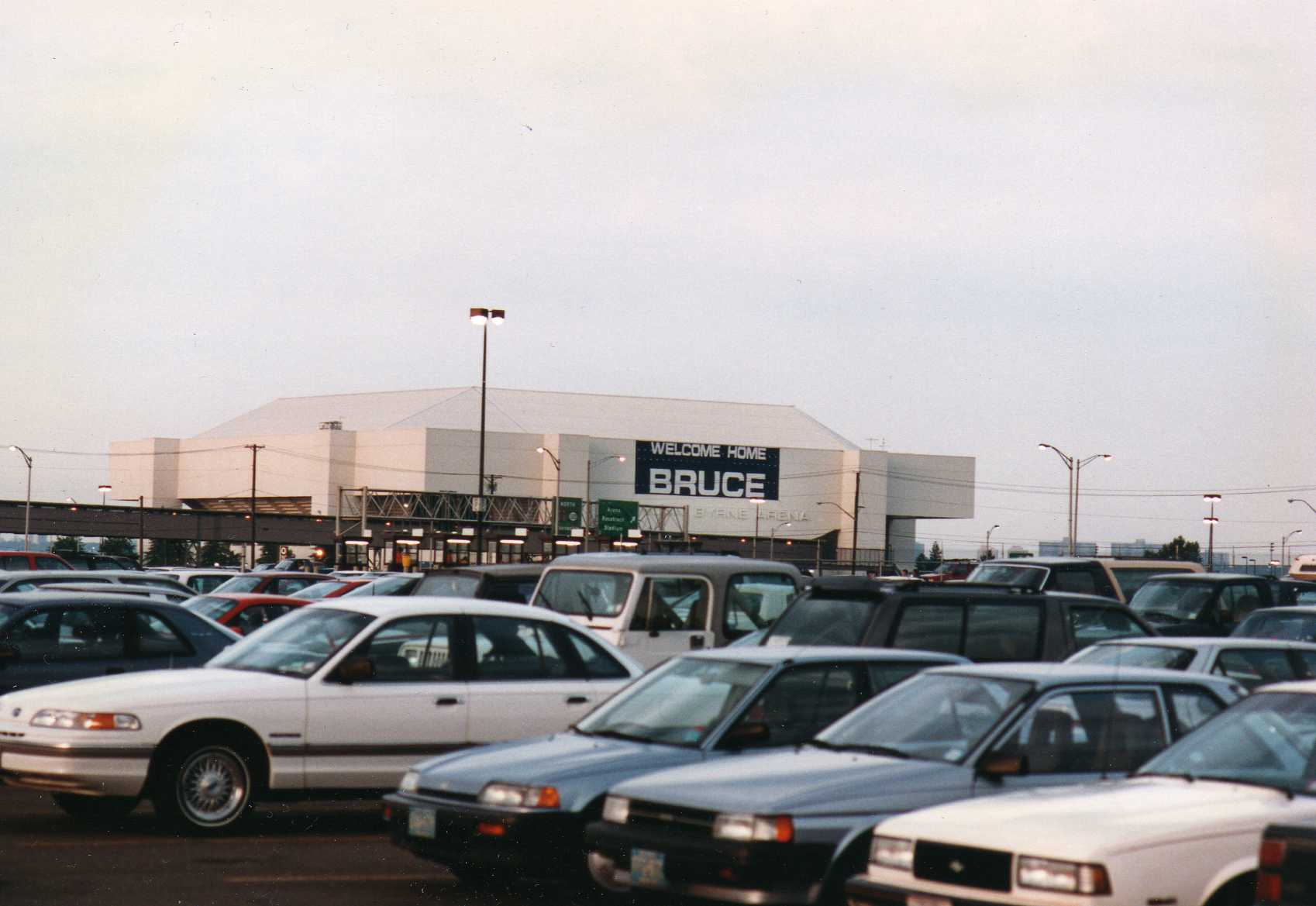
The second annual SummerSlam was held at the Brendan Byrne Arena in East Rutherford, New Jersey.

Following the success of SummerSlam in August 1988, the professional wrestling promotion World Wrestling Federation (WWF, renamed WWE in 2002) scheduled a second SummerSlam to be held on Monday, August 28, 1989, at the Brendan Byrne Arena in East Rutherford, New Jersey, establishing SummerSlam as an annual August pay-per-view (PPV) event. Dubbed "The Biggest Party of the Summer", it was one of the WWF's original four PPVs, along with WrestleMania, Royal Rumble, and Survivor Series, referred to as the "Big Four". It has since become considered the WWF's second biggest event of the year behind WrestleMania.

=== Storylines ===
The main feud heading into SummerSlam pitted WWF Champion Hulk Hogan and Brutus "The Barber" Beefcake against "Macho Man" Randy Savage and Zeus. At WrestleMania V in April 1989, Hogan defeated Savage to win his second WWF Championship (then known as the WWF World Heavyweight Championship). WWF financed a professional wrestling movie "No Holds Barred". Hogan starred as the hero Rip, a popular professional wrestler, while Tom Lister played the villain Zeus. In the movie, Hogan defeated Zeus. The rivalry spanned in WWF, because Zeus wanted to take revenge from Hogan in real-life due to Hogan breaking Zeus's nose on set. In the WWF, he was also billed as Zeus. He made his first appearance on WWF television on the May 27, 1989, edition of Saturday Night's Main Event XXI before Hogan's WWF title defense against Big Boss Man in a steel cage match. He was introduced by Boss Man's manager Slick. During Hogan's entrance, Zeus brutally attacked him. On the July 29 edition of Saturday Night's Main Event XXII, Zeus attacked Brutus Beefcake during Beefcake's match with Hogan's rival Randy Savage. Zeus did this because Beefcake was on the cusp of defeating Randy Savage. Hogan came to the rescue but was unable to drop Zeus because Savage gave him two chair shots in the back. This led to the Hogan & Beefcake vs. Savage & Zeus encounter at SummerSlam.

The main singles match on the card was between Ravishing Rick Rude versus Ultimate Warrior for the WWF Intercontinental Heavyweight Championship. They had a "Super Posedown" at the Royal Rumble in January 1989 which was won by Warrior, prompting Rude to angrily attack him with a steel workout bar. This led to their title match at WrestleMania V, where Warrior lost the Intercontinental Heavyweight Championship to Rude. They were signed to a rematch for the title at SummerSlam, with Rude defending the title against Warrior.

== Event ==
Other on-screen personnel
Role:	Name:
Commentators	Tony Schiavone
Commentators	Jesse Ventura
Ring announcers	Howard Finkel
Ring announcers	Ron Garvin
Interviewers	Gene Okerlund
Interviewers	Sean Mooney
Referees	Earl Hebner
Referees	Joey Marella
Referees	Freddie Sparta
Referees	Tim White

Before the event began airing live on pay-per-view, Dino Bravo defeated Koko B. Ware in a dark match.

The first match of the pay-per-view was a non-title tag team match between the WWF Tag Team Champions The Brain Busters (Arn Anderson and Tully Blanchard), accompanied to the ring by Bobby Heenan, and The Hart Foundation (Bret Hart and Jim Neidhart). In the middle of the match, Anderson tried to interfere, causing all four men to fight in the ring. Meanwhile, Heenan had the referee distracted, which allowed Anderson to perform a double ax handle, dropping his elbow onto the back of Hart's neck as Hart covered Blanchard. Anderson then rolled Blanchard out of the ring and covered Hart. Heenan stopped distracting the referee who turned to see the pin and began the count without realizing that Anderson was not the legal man in the match. Although the Brain Busters were the reigning Tag-Team Champions going into the match, according to the storyline the match against the Harts was signed before they had won the titles and thus the belts were not on the line at SummerSlam.

The second match of the evening was between Dusty Rhodes and The Honky Tonk Man, who was managed by Jimmy Hart. Rhodes had the advantage until Hart distracted him. This allowed The Honky Tonk Man to grab Hart's megaphone and ram it into Rhodes' midsection. The Honky Tonk Man continued in the offensive position until Rhodes' was able to get back on his feet. The Honky Tonk Man, however, shoved Rhodes into the referee, knocking him out. This allowed The Honky Tonk Man to hold Rhodes while Hart attempted to hit Rhodes with The Honky Tonk Man's guitar. Rhodes, however, moved out of the way, and Hart hit The Honky Tonk Man instead. Rhodes then performed his finishing move, the Bionic Elbow, and pinned him for the win. After the match Sean Mooney interviewed Honky Tonk in the aisle. A still dazed Honky, thinking he was Elvis and that Jimmy Hart was "Cilla", asked Mooney where the stage was.

The third match, which pitted Mr. Perfect against The Red Rooster, began with a shoving match in the center of the ring. Mr. Perfect performed several offensive maneuvers on The Red Rooster, even preventing Rooster from reversing a slam to the mat. Mr. Perfect ended the match by performing a dropkick and the Perfect Plex and then pinning him for the win. The match was ended early due to Taylor legitimately injuring his knee. He would be sidelined afterwards for several months.

In the subsequent match-up, Rick Martel and The Fabulous Rougeaus (Jacques Rougeau and Raymond Rougeau) faced Tito Santana and The Rockers (Shawn Michaels and Marty Jannetty). In the first moments of the match, Santana and The Rockers cleared all the opposing team members from the ring. Jannetty was the legal man for his team and faced all three opponents as they tagged each other into the match. Martel and the Rougeaus kept Jannetty isolated in their corner by utilizing illegal double team moves. After some time, Santana tagged Michaels into the match, who quickly regained the advantage. Near the end of the match, Jimmy Hart, who had accompanied The Rougeaus and Martel to the ring, distracted Jannetty, who was hit from behind by Jacques. As a result, Martel was able to pin Jannetty.

The next match was a WWF Intercontinental Championship match between Ultimate Warrior and the defending champion Rick Rude, who was accompanied to the ring by Bobby Heenan. Before the match a video was aired showing that in the weeks prior to SummerSlam, members of The Heenan Family including Haku and André the Giant had attempted to take Warrior 'out' in order to help Rude keep his title. Warrior gained the early advantage in the beginning of the contest by press slamming Rude from the ring onto the arena's floor, where he followed him and continued the assault, including hitting Rude with the IC belt. He continued to have the advantage until Rude was able to thwart an offensive maneuver by pushing Warrior from the top rope onto the turnbuckle. The two wrestlers swapped the offensive position until Roddy Piper came down to ringside to distract Rude by flipping up his Kilt and showing Rude his bare ass (though in reality Piper was wearing a jockstrap). This allowed The Warrior to perform a German suplex, press slam, and a "Warrior Splash". Warrior then pinned Rude to become the new Intercontinental Champion. Following the match, commentator Jesse Ventura claimed that Warrior should cut the belt in half and give the rest to Piper. Heenan and Rude also stormed into the backstage interview area and interrupted Gene Okerlund's interview with Ron Garvin. Heenan was so upset during the interview he ended up babbling.

Jim Duggan and Demolition (Ax and Smash) defeated André the Giant and The Twin Towers (Big Boss Man and Akeem) (with Bobby Heenan and Slick). Smash pinned Akeem after Duggan hit Akeem in the head with his 2×4.

Greg Valentine (with Jimmy Hart) defeated Hercules. Valentine pinned Hercules with his feet on the ropes, something the referee failed to see. Guest ring announcer Ronnie Garvin (who was feuding with Valentine at the time) refused to announce Valentine as the winner of the match. Garvin repeatedly announced Hercules as the winner by disqualification (even though Valentine had officially won the match).

Ted DiBiase (with his bodyguard Virgil) defeated Jimmy Snuka by countout. Following the match, Snuka delivered a flying headbutt to DiBiase, knocking him out of the ring before headbutting and slamming Virgil and performing his Superfly Splash on the prone bodyguard.

In the main event, Hulk Hogan and Brutus Beefcake faced Randy Savage and Zeus. After all of the wrestlers were introduced, Miss Elizabeth was introduced and came to the ring separately. In the beginning, Beefcake and Savage brawled on the floor and Zeus no-sold Hogan. Beefcake came out and made the save but was caught by Zeus in a bearhug. Hogan tried to save his partner but he also became victim of a bearhug by Zeus. Savage came off the top rope and hit Hogan with a diving double axe handle. He hit Hogan another double axe handle from the top rope and a running knee for a near-fall. Savage applied a chinlock on Hogan but Hogan hit Savage with shoulder blocks. He came off the ropes where Zeus assaulted him. Zeus got a tag and then he beat on Hogan and locked in a bearhug where he took Hogan to the mat for several near-falls. Zeus took him in their corner and then tagged Savage. Savage connected with a neckbreaker on Hogan and spat on Beefcake, forcing him to get into the ring. Savage hit a belly to belly suplex on Hogan for a near-fall. Hogan tagged in Beefcake who hit Savage with a high knee for a near-fall. He locked in a Barber's Chair on Savage, who fell to the knees but then got up and drove Beefcake's head in the corner. Zeus tagged in and was very angry. Beefcake hit him with an eye rake and applied a Barber's Chair on Zeus. Savage took his manager Sensational Sherri's loaded purse and hit Beefcake in the back with it. Savage got a tag, calmed down Zeus and got a near-fall on Beefcake which ended after Hogan made the save. Savage went for another cover and Hogan came in again and chased Savage, who hid behind Hogan's manager Miss Elizabeth and was beaten up by Hogan. Zeus came in and locked a chokehold on Beefcake before tagging Savage. Savage and Beefcake knocked out each other. Beefcake tagged Hogan. Hogan connected with a corner clothesline on Savage and then assaulted Zeus. He hit a big boot on Savage, sending him to the floor. Hogan tried to suplex Savage in the ring from the apron but Sherri tripped him as Savage fell on Hogan for a near-fall. He clotheslined Hogan and he hit a Savage Elbow from the top rope but like WrestleMania V, Hogan no-sold it. He beat on Savage and sent him to the floor after an atomic drop. Zeus tagged in. He beat Zeus with clotheslines. Zeus fell on one knee. Miss Elizabeth tripped Sherri and Beefcake tossed Savage on the mat. The referee was distracted. Hogan took advantage and hit Zeus with Sherri's loaded purse, followed by a scoop slam and a leg drop for the victory.

== Aftermath ==
Hulk Hogan and Brutus Beefcake met Randy Savage and Zeus in a rematch at No Holds Barred pay-per-view contested in a steel cage where Hogan and Beefcake won again. Prior to the "No Holds Barred" pay-per-view rematch, Zeus began appearing in the corner of Ted DiBiase as he renewed his push for Hogan's WWF Championship, and Zeus was on the DiBiase-captained team facing Hogan at the 1989 Survivor Series; Hogan also began facing Savage in a series of one-on-one steel cage matches. A steel cage match was also used in the final match involving the Hogan-Beefcake vs. Savage-Zeus storyline, where the two tag teams faced each other during a special pay-per-view, No Holds Barred: The Match/The Movie, in December; there, Hogan and Beefcake defeated Savage and Zeus. Hogan then transferred into a feud with Ultimate Warrior in 1990, leading to their "Ultimate Challenge" match at Wrestlemania VI.

The Brain Busters (Arn Anderson and Tully Blanchard) defended the WWF Tag Team Championship until losing the belts back to Demolition in October 1989. The title change took place at a television taping for the WWF's syndicated Superstars of Wrestling, and did not air until the weekend of November 4, 1989; until the airing of the title match on Superstars, Anderson and Blanchard competed at WWF events as the champions, but were frequently not announced as such. Blanchard would be fired for failing a drug test on November 1 and Haku replaced Anderson on the bookings until Survivor Series, when Anderson left the WWF and returned to WCW.

Rick Rude moved into his new feud with Roddy Piper, with the two exchanging insults throughout the fall of 1989, including an incident on Prime Time Wrestling where they had an altercation that escalated after Rude spit on Piper. Their differences were settled in a steel cage match in December 1989, with Piper winning. Meanwhile, Ultimate Warrior defended his title primarily against André the Giant, regularly squashing the "Eighth Wonder of the World" in less than 30 seconds at house shows across the country (and at least once during a televised match from Madison Square Garden in New York City). With the departure of Blanchard and Anderson, André was placed in a tag team with Haku and dubbed the Colossal Connection; they immediately targeted Demolition and went on to win the Tag Team Championship during a December 1989 Superstars television taping. André's feud with Ultimate Warrior and placement in the tag team with Haku were ways of keeping the aging "Eighth Wonder of the World" in the spotlight, as his health was continuing to decline.

The other major feud that continued involved Ron Garvin and Greg Valentine. Upset at Garvin for his actions during SummerSlam, Valentine demanded that Garvin – who was still barred from competing after having lost a retirement match to Valentine – be reinstated so that the two could settle their differences once and for all. Garvin eventually got the upper hand in their last match, winning a submission match at the 1990 Royal Rumble.

The Red Rooster would appear in the 1990 Royal Rumble before leaving the WWF for WCW in mid 1990 and would return to his Terry Taylor persona, while Curt "Mr. Perfect" Hennig would move on to a feud with Brutus Beefcake after the Royal Rumble. Tito Santana and Rick Martel continued to face each other, with Santana defeating Martel in the finals of the King of the Ring tournament on October 14.

== Home media and streaming ==
The event was released on VHS by Coliseum Video in the United States and in 1991 by Silver Vision in the United Kingdom during a period in which the WWF back catalogue was being re-released in the UK.

In August 2004, it was re-released on DVD in the United Kingdom as part of Silver Vision's Tagged Classics range, and was paired with SummerSlam 1988. This DVD set was not released in the USA.

In 2014, the event was included on the WWE's streaming platform the WWE Network as part of its launch and remained on the service until the platform closed. In July 2025, WWE uploaded the event to stream freely on their WWE Vault YouTube channel.

== Results ==
No.	Results	Stipulations	Times
1^{D}	Dino Bravo defeated Koko B. Ware	Singles match	8:52
2	The Brain Busters (Arn Anderson and Tully Blanchard) (with Bobby Heenan) defeated The Hart Foundation (Bret Hart and Jim Neidhart)	Tag team match	16:23
3	Dusty Rhodes defeated The Honky Tonk Man (with Jimmy Hart)	Singles Match	9:36
4	Mr. Perfect defeated The Red Rooster	Singles Match	3:21
5	Rick Martel and The Fabulous Rougeaus (Jacques and Raymond) (with Slick and Jimmy Hart) defeated Tito Santana and The Rockers (Shawn Michaels and Marty Jannetty)	Six-man tag team match	14:58
6	Ultimate Warrior defeated Rick Rude (c) (with Bobby Heenan)	Singles Match for the WWF Intercontinental Championship	16:02
7	Jim Duggan and Demolition (Ax and Smash) defeated André the Giant and The Twin Towers (Akeem and Big Boss Man) (with Bobby Heenan and Slick)	Six-man tag team match	7:23
8	Greg Valentine (with Jimmy Hart) defeated Hercules	Singles Match	3:08
9	Ted DiBiase (with Virgil) defeated Jimmy Snuka by countout	Singles Match	6:27
10	Hulk Hogan and Brutus Beefcake (with Miss Elizabeth) defeated Randy Savage and Zeus (with Sensational Sherri)	Tag team match	15:04
(c) / – the champion(s) heading into the match; D / – this was a dark match
