= No Holds Barred: The Match/The Movie =

1989 World Wrestling Federation pay-per-view event

- Promotion: World Wrestling Federation
- Date: December 12, 1989 (aired December 27, 1989)
- City: Nashville, Tennessee
- Venue: Nashville Municipal Auditorium

Pay-per-view chronology
← Previous; Survivor Series	Next → Royal Rumble

No Holds Barred: The Match/The Movie was a 1989 professional wrestling pay-per-view (PPV) event produced by the World Wrestling Federation (WWF, renamed WWE in 2002). The program aired on December 27, 1989, and consisted of the company's 1989 film No Holds Barred in its entirety, which starred WWF wrestler Hulk Hogan, followed by a match previously recorded at a Wrestling Challenge taping on December 12 at the Nashville Municipal Auditorium in Nashville, Tennessee. It was one of the few pay-per-view events not made available for streaming at the launch of WWE Network service, although in 2018, the cage match became available as part of the WWE Supertape compilation in the service's Classic Home Video section.

== Production ==
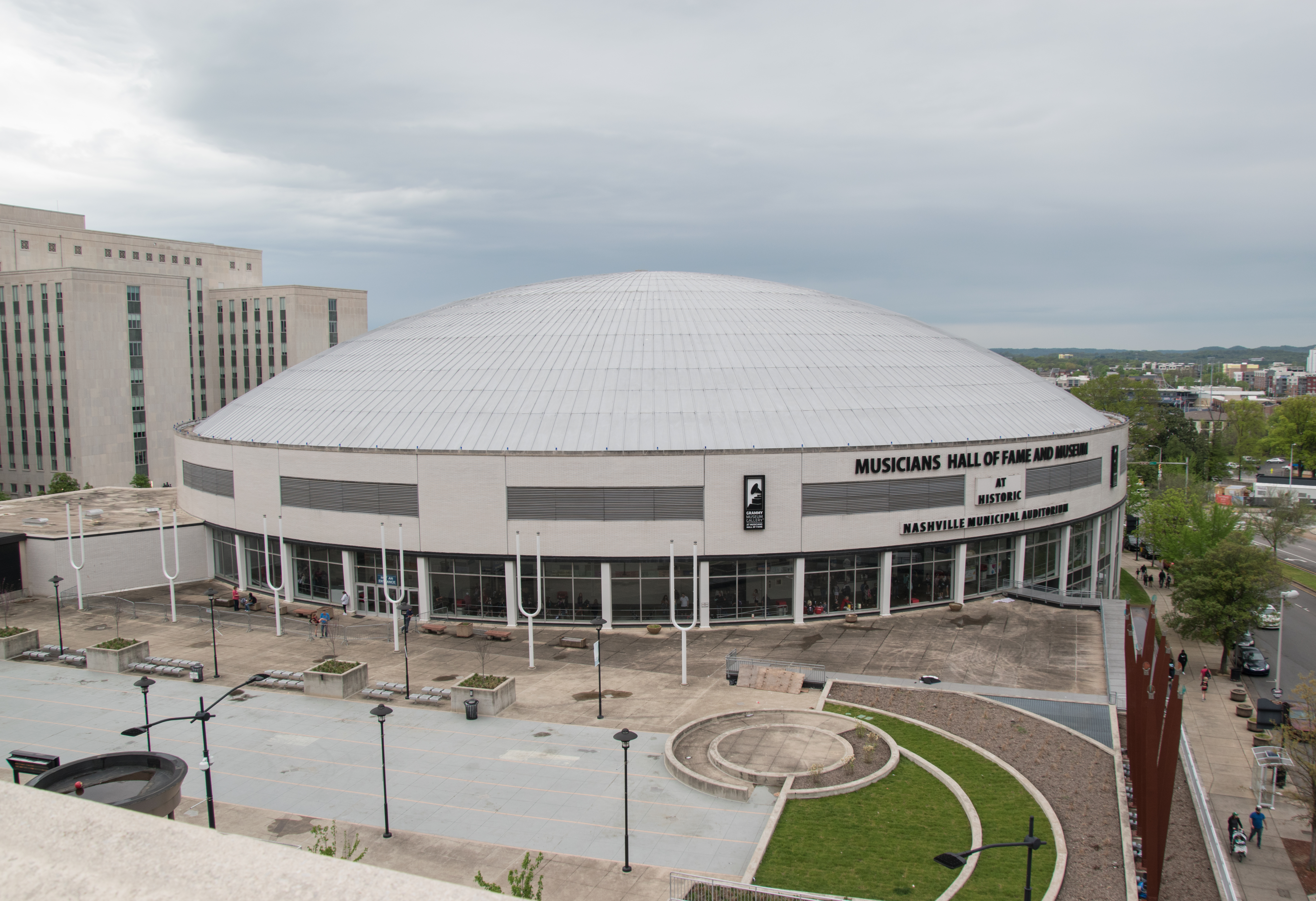
The pay-per-view broadcast on December 27 only featured one match, which was previously recorded in conjunction with a Wrestling Challenge taping on December 12 at the Nashville Municipal Auditorium in Nashville, Tennessee.

=== Background ===
In 1989, the professional wrestling promotion World Wrestling Federation (WWF, renamed WWE in 2002) scheduled a pay-per-view (PPV) titled No Holds Barred: The Match/The Movie to broadcast on December 27, 1989. The program consisted of the company's 1989 film No Holds Barred in its entirety, which starred WWF wrestler Hulk Hogan, followed by a match that was previously recorded at a Wrestling Challenge taping on December 12 at the Nashville Municipal Auditorium in Nashville, Tennessee.

=== Storylines ===
The main event pitted Hulk Hogan and Zeus on opposing tag teams. Hogan teamed with longtime friend Brutus Beefcake, while the heel Zeus teamed with Randy Savage. All four had been involved in an intertwined feud since the summer. Zeus had made several appearances at WWF events and cut promos stating that he, and not Hogan, should have received top billing in No Holds Barred. Meanwhile, as Hogan and Savage were feuding over the WWF World Heavyweight Championship, Beefcake began feuding with Savage after Beefcake insulted Savage's manager Sensational Sherri during a TV taping. At the 1989 SummerSlam, Hogan and Beefcake teamed to defeat Savage and Zeus, after which the tag team feud simmered for several months as Zeus began appearing with Ted DiBiase in the lead-up to the 1989 Survivor Series. Unlike 1989 SummerSlam, Miss Elizabeth did not appear at this event.

The Hogan-Beefcake vs. Savage-Zeus tag team rivalry resumed after Survivor Series, in the lead-up to "No Holds Barred: The Match/The Movie."

== Event ==
Other on-screen personnel
Role:	Name:
Commentator	Vince McMahon
Commentator	Jesse Ventura
Interviewer	Gene Okerlund
Interviewer	Tony Schiavone
Interviewer	Sean Mooney
Ring announcer	Howard Finkel
Referee	Earl Hebner
Referee	Joey Marella
Referee	John Bonello
Referee	Rene Goulet
Referee	Shane Stevens

The Hogan-Beefcake vs. Savage-Zeus steel-cage match was part of a WWF Wrestling Challenge taping. Non-televised matches from the taping saw Dusty Rhodes defeat Big Boss Man, WWF Intercontinental Champion Ultimate Warrior defeat Dino Bravo, The Colossal Connection (André the Giant and Haku) defeat WWF Tag Team Champions Demolition (Ax and Smash) by countout and Mr. Perfect defeat Ronnie Garvin.

Hulk Hogan and Brutus Beefcake defeated Randy Savage and Zeus in the 10:27-long steel-cage match. The match could be won either by pinfall/submission or by having both members of a team escape the cage.

After a back-and-forth match early on, all four competitors were knocked out after Hogan hit a suplex on Zeus, and Beefcake and Savage hit each other's heads into the cage structure. Sensational Sherri (the manager of the Savage-Zeus team) handed a chain to Savage, who attempted to strike Beefcake with a fist drop off the top of the cage, but Beefcake recovered and caught Savage coming off. Eventually, Beefcake knocked Savage to the mat and escaped the cage; Savage — with some eventual help from Beefcake — crawled outside. Meanwhile, Hogan rallied against Zeus, battering him before dropping three leg drops to score the pin and the win for the Hogan-Beefcake team.

== Aftermath ==
This was Zeus's last match in the WWF, as he left shortly afterwards. Randy Savage continued to target Hogan over the WWF Championship, culminating in a match at The Main Event III. Zeus (as Z-Gangsta) and Hogan would eventually face each other again in the main event at WCW's Uncensored (1996) with Savage this time partnering Hogan, in a two-versus-eight Doomsday Cage match.

A day after the tapings, the Colossal Connection defeated Demolition for the WWF Tag Team Championship only to lose the titles back to Demolition at Wrestlemania VI. Dino Bravo continued to challenge Ultimate Warrior for the Intercontinental Championship, culminating in a match at The Main Event III.

Ultimate Warrior and Hulk Hogan would begin their march toward "The Ultimate Challenge" at Royal Rumble, when they would face each other down in the ring during the Royal Rumble match. Dusty Rhodes would wrap up his feud with the Big Boss Man and move into a feud with "Macho King" Randy Savage and "Queen" Sensational Sherri which would culminate in a match at WrestleMania VI.

== Home media and streaming ==
The Steel Cage match was later released on home video, appearing on the inaugural WWF Supertape. In November 2024, the WWE uploaded the entire home video, including the cage match, to stream freely on their WWE Vault YouTube channel.

== Results ==
No.	Results	Stipulations	Times
1^{D}	Big Boss Man defeated Dusty Rhodes	Singles match	—
2^{D}	Ultimate Warrior (c) defeated Dino Bravo	Singles match for the WWF Intercontinental Championship	—
3^{D}	The Colossal Connection (André the Giant and Haku) defeated Demolition (Ax and Smash) (c) by countout	Tag team match for the WWF Tag Team Championship	—
4^{D}	Mr. Perfect defeated Ronnie Garvin	Singles match	—
5	Hulk Hogan and Brutus Beefcake defeated Randy Savage and Zeus (with Queen Sherri)	Steel Cage match	10:27
(c) / – the champion(s) heading into the match; D / – this was a dark match
