= Survivor Series (1989) =

World Wrestling Federation pay-per-view event

- Promotional poster
- Promotion: World Wrestling Federation
- Date: November 23, 1989
- City: Rosemont, Illinois
- Venue: Rosemont Horizon
- Attendance: 15,294
- Tagline: "The WWF Thanksgiving Night Tradition!"

Pay-per-view chronology
← Previous; SummerSlam	Next → No Holds Barred: The Match/The Movie

Survivor Series chronology
← Previous; 1988	Next → 1990

The 1989 Survivor Series was a professional wrestling pay-per-view (PPV) event produced by the World Wrestling Federation (WWF, renamed WWE in 2002). It was the third annual Survivor Series event and took place on Thanksgiving Day in the United States on Thursday, November 23, 1989, at the Rosemont Horizon in the Chicago suburb of Rosemont, Illinois. The event centered on the Survivor Series match, a tag team elimination match that pits teams of multiple wrestlers against each other.

The pay-per-view broadcast consisted of five matches, all of which were Survivor Series matches, and there was also one dark match before the event aired live. The main event was a four-on-four Survivor Series match in which The Ultimate Warriors (Ultimate Warrior, Jim Neidhart, Shawn Michaels, and Marty Jannetty) defeated The Heenan Family (Bobby Heenan, André the Giant, Haku, and Arn Anderson). This was the first Survivor Series event with named teams and with four members (instead of five).

== Production ==
=== Background ===
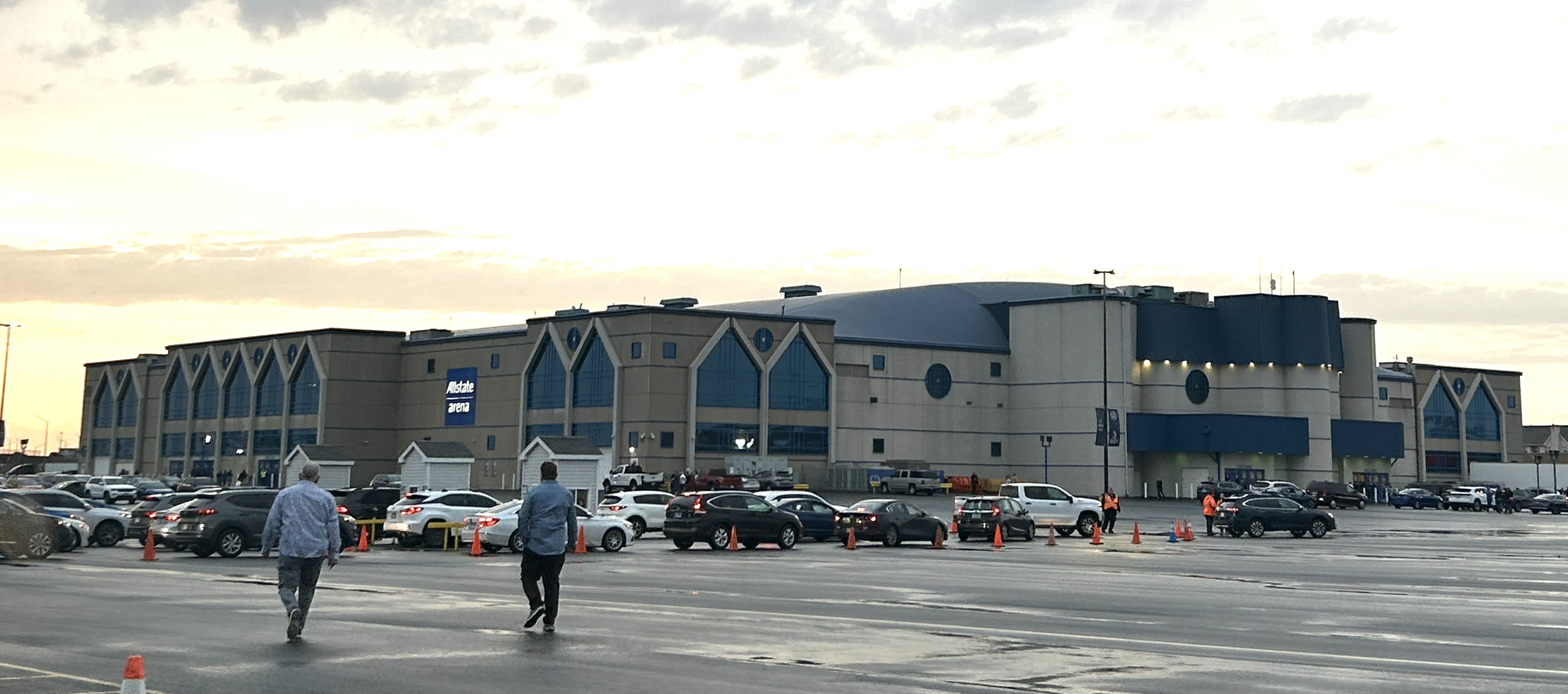
The third annual Survivor Series event was held in the Chicago suburb of Rosemont, Illinois at the Rosemont Horizon (pictured as Allstate Arena, renamed in 1999).

Survivor Series is an annual professional wrestling pay-per-view (PPV) event, produced every November by the World Wrestling Federation (WWF, renamed WWE in 2002) since 1987, held around Thanksgiving in the United States. In what has become the second longest running PPV event in history (behind WWE's WrestleMania), it is one of the promotion's original four PPVs, along with WrestleMania, Royal Rumble, and SummerSlam, eventually referred to as the "Big Four". Like the previous two years, the third Survivor Series only featured Survivor Series matches, which are tag team elimination matches. While those two previous events had included three matches that pitted teams of five wrestlers against each other and one that pitted five tag teams against each other, all five of the Survivor Series matches at the 1989 event were teams of four wrestlers against each other. Like the prior two years, the third Survivor Series event was scheduled to be held on Thanksgiving Day on Thursday, November 23, 1989, taking place at the Rosemont Horizon in the Chicago suburb of Rosemont, Illinois.

=== Storylines ===
A major feud heading into Survivor Series was between The Ultimate Warriors (WWF Intercontinental Heavyweight Champion Ultimate Warrior and The Rockers (Shawn Michaels and Marty Jannetty) and Jim Neidhart vs. The Heenan Family, The Colossal Connection (André the Giant and Haku) and The Brain Busters (Arn Anderson and Tully Blanchard). Bobby Heenan was a very popular heel manager, who led many heel wrestlers to championship victories in the WWF and his clients feuded with all babyface wrestlers. Ultimate Warrior had been placed in a feud with Heenan's client Rick Rude which began at Royal Rumble when Warrior won by fan reaction over Rude in a posedown. Rude followed by attacking him. They feuded with each other until the summer of the year, in which they exchanged the Intercontinental Heavyweight Championship with each other. The Rockers were in a feud with Brain Busters, that had also begun since the beginning of the year. The feud began on January 30, 1989 edition of Prime Time Wrestling where The Brain Busters faced The Rockers. In the match, The Brain Busters narrowly defeated the Rockers as Anderson held down Marty Jannetty's leg as Blanchard pinned him. The Rockers and The Brain Busters faced each other in a rematch on March 11 Saturday Night's Main Event XX which resulted in a double countout. They were added to the main event of Survivor Series in opposing teams.

Dusty Rhodes began a feud with Big Boss Man in mid-1989, when Rhodes came to the aid of a preliminary wrestler during the July 22nd episode of WWF Superstars of Wrestling (taped June 28), stealing the Big Boss Man's nightstick and handcuffs in the process. Later in the same episode of WWF Superstars of Wrestling, Rhodes was a guest on The Brother Love Show, where he proclaimed that "no one was afraid of the Boss Man anymore." Rhodes captained the Dream Team, while the Big Boss Man captained The Enforcers. Akeem, one half of The Twin Towers, defeated Brutus Beefcake in a King of the Ring tournament qualifying match on October 14, leading to a feud between Beefcake and Akeem. Beefcake joined Dusty's Dream Team while Akeem was scheduled to be a member of Enforcers. Tito Santana and Rick Martel, former Strike Force teammates had been feuding with each other since WrestleMania V, where Martel turned heel by abandoning Santana during their match against Brain Busters (Arn Anderson and Tully Blanchard). At SummerSlam, Martel and The Fabulous Rougeaus (Jacques and Raymond Rougeau) defeated Santana and The Rockers (Shawn Michaels and Marty Jannetty). Martel became a member of The Enforcers while Santana was added to The Dream Team. The Honky Tonk Man and The Red Rooster wrestled a series of house show matches in the fall of 1989, with Honky winning most of these encounters. Honky was added to The Enforcers, while the Red Rooster joined The Dream Team.

Randy Savage turned heel in early 1989, breaking up The Mega Powers. He defeated Jim Duggan later that same year to win the title of "King of Wrestling", beginning a feud between Duggan and himself. Greg Valentine and Ronnie Garvin had been feuding since a match on December 30, 1988 in Madison Square Garden (MSG) which Valentine won by grabbing the tights for leverage. On April 22, 1989 episode of Superstars, Garvin defeated Valentine in a match. On the following edition of Superstars, they both faced each other in a retirement match in which the loser could not wrestle anymore in WWF. Valentine won the match, sending Garvin into retirement. Garvin became a referee for the WWF. During this time, he punched several wrestlers who physically provoked him, including Valentine in the course of his match against Jimmy Snuka, and he was suspended after the match. Valentine was also involved in a feud with Hercules, which culminated at SummerSlam where Valentine defeated Hercules by pinning him using the ropes for leverage. Garvin was the guest ring announcer for the match, and not only did he verbally mock Valentine during the introduction, but he also announced Hercules as the winner by disqualification. Valentine was so furious that he demanded Garvin be reinstated as a professional wrestler, and his request was accepted. Garvin and Hercules were included as members of 4x4s at Survivor Series, and Valentine was added as a member of King's Court. Dino Bravo was involved in a feud with Bret Hart. At Royal Rumble, Jim Duggan, Hart and Jim Neidhart defeated Bravo and The Fabulous Rougeaus in a two out of three falls match, so Bravo became a member of King's Court at Survivor Series and Hart became a member of 4x4s.

Hulk Hogan starred in the WWF-financed professional-wrestling movie No Holds Barred as the protagonist, Rip. Tommy Lister Jr. portrayed Rip's arch rival Zeus in the movie, who is defeated by Rip. It turned into a rivalry that took place in the WWF. Lister was billed as Zeus, who wanted to take revenge of the movie from Hogan in real-life. He debuted on May 27, 1989 Saturday Night's Main Event XXI before Hogan's WWF World Heavyweight Championship title defense against Big Boss Man in a steel cage. Boss Man's manager Slick introduced him. Zeus attacked Hogan during Hogan's entrance. The feud culminated at SummerSlam where Hogan and Brutus Beefcake defeated Randy Savage and Zeus. Zeus was scheduled to become a part of Million $ Team against Hogan's Hulkamaniacs team at Survivor Series. At WrestleMania V, Ted DiBiase attempted to steal Jake Roberts' snake Damien during Roberts' match against André the Giant beginning a rivalry between Roberts and DiBiase. Roberts defeated DiBiase's manager Virgil on Superstars but after the match, DiBiase injured him and sidelined him for months. Roberts returned in late 1989 and signed to become a part of Hogan's Hulkamaniacs team against DiBiase's Million $ Team. Demolition (Ax and Smash) were pushed as a heel tag team in the WWF in 1988 under the tutelage of Mr. Fuji. A stronger and powerful babyface tag team The Powers of Pain (The Warlord and The Barbarian) debuted in the summer of 1988 and challenged Demolition for the WWF Tag Team Championship. At Survivor Series, Fuji caused Demolition to get eliminated in a Survivor Series match resulting in a double turn as Powers of Pain turned heels and Demolition turned babyfaces. At WrestleMania V, Demolition defeated Powers of Pain and Mr. Fuji in a handicap match to retain the tag titles, culminating in Demolition joining Hulkamaniacs at Survivor Series and Powers of Pain joining Million $ Team in Survivor Series.

At SummerSlam, Roddy Piper interfered in Rick Rude's WWF Intercontinental Heavyweight Championship title defense against Ultimate Warrior and distracted Rude, causing Rude to lose the title to Warrior. This led to Rude and Piper captaining teams against each other at Survivor Series. Rude's team was dubbed "Rude Brood", and Piper's team was dubbed "Roddy's Rowdies". Jimmy Snuka became a part of Rowdy's Rowdies and Mr. Perfect became a part of Rude Brood. The Bushwhackers (Bushwhacker Butch and Bushwhacker Luke) feuded with The Fabulous Rougeaus (Jacques and Raymond Rougeau) in early 1989. This led to their WrestleMania V encounter where Bushwhackers won, leading to Bushwhackers joining Roddy's Rowdies and Rougeaus joining Rude Brood.

== Event ==
Other on-screen personnel
Role:	Name:
Commentator	Gorilla Monsoon
Commentator	Jesse Ventura
Interviewer	Gene Okerlund
Interviewer	Sean Mooney
Ring announcer	Howard Finkel
Referee	Earl Hebner
Referee	Joey Marella
Referee	Tim White
Referee	Mike Chioda
Referee	John Bonello
Referee	Rene Goulet
Referee	Shane Stevens

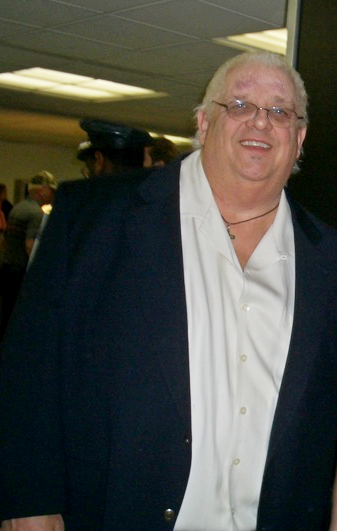
Dusty Rhodes captained The Dream Team at Survivor Series.

Before the event aired live on pay-per-view, Boris Zhukov defeated Paul Roma in a dark match. The opening included superstars expressing what they were thankful for, followed by a rundown of the card narrated by Vince McMahon. The first Survivor Series match was between The Dream Team (Dusty Rhodes, Brutus Beefcake, The Red Rooster and Tito Santana) and The Enforcers (Big Boss Man, Bad News Brown, Rick Martel and The Honky Tonk Man). Originally, Boss Man's tag team The Twin Towers partner Akeem was scheduled to be a part of The Enforcers but was replaced by Brown. Rick Martel and Tito Santana, two former Strike Force partners and current rivals began the match. Martel pinned Santana with a roll-up, eliminating Santana, leaving Dream Team with three members. Sapphire made another appearance in the audience, after appearing the previous week on TV cheering on Dusty Rhodes in a match against Akeem. Like the previous year, Bad News Brown walked out on his team after arguing with team captain Big Boss Man and getting counted out. Both teams continued with three members each until Brutus Beefcake pinned Honky Tonk Man after a high knee, eliminating Honky and leaving Enforcers with only two members – Boss Man and Martel. Martel entered but failed to eliminate Beefcake. Instead, Beefcake pinned Martel with a roll-up, eliminating him and leaving Enforcers' captain Boss Man as the remaining member. He managed to pin Red Rooster after a Boss Man Slam. He fought the opposing Dream Team's captain Dusty Rhodes. The two captains had a battle with each other, which Rhodes won after he pinned Boss Man with a flying crossbody. Dream Team won with Rhodes and Beefcake as the survivors.

The second Survivor Series match was between The King's Court (Randy Savage, Canadian Earthquake, Dino Bravo and Greg Valentine) and 4x4s (Jim Duggan, Bret Hart, Ronnie Garvin and Hercules). Canadian Earthquake was a replacement for The Widowmaker, after Windham left the company in October due to his family’s involvement in a counterfeit scandal. Hercules and Earthquake began the match. Earthquake hit Hercules an Earthquake Splash and pinned Hercules to eliminate him, leaving 4x4s with three members. Greg Valentine came next against the team captain of the 4x4s, Jim Duggan. Duggan used his bigger size on Valentine and hit him with a three-point stance charging clothesline and pinned Valentine to eliminate him, leaving King's Court with three members too. Dino Bravo brawled with Ronnie Garvin. Bravo hit Garvin a side slam and pinned Garvin to eliminate him, leaving 4x4s with two members – Duggan and Bret Hart. Hart used his high-flying ability but fell victim to a Savage Elbow by opposing team King's Court captain Randy Savage. Savage followed by pinning Hart and eliminating him, leaving 4x4s with their captain Duggan. Duggan was able to fend by himself against King's Court, who were all three. Savage's valet Queen Sherri interfered which distracted Duggan. Duggan went to the outside to chase her and got counted out. King's Court won the match with Savage, Earthquake, and Bravo as the survivors. After the match, Duggan grabbed his 2x4 and attacked Savage, Earthquake and Bravo with it.

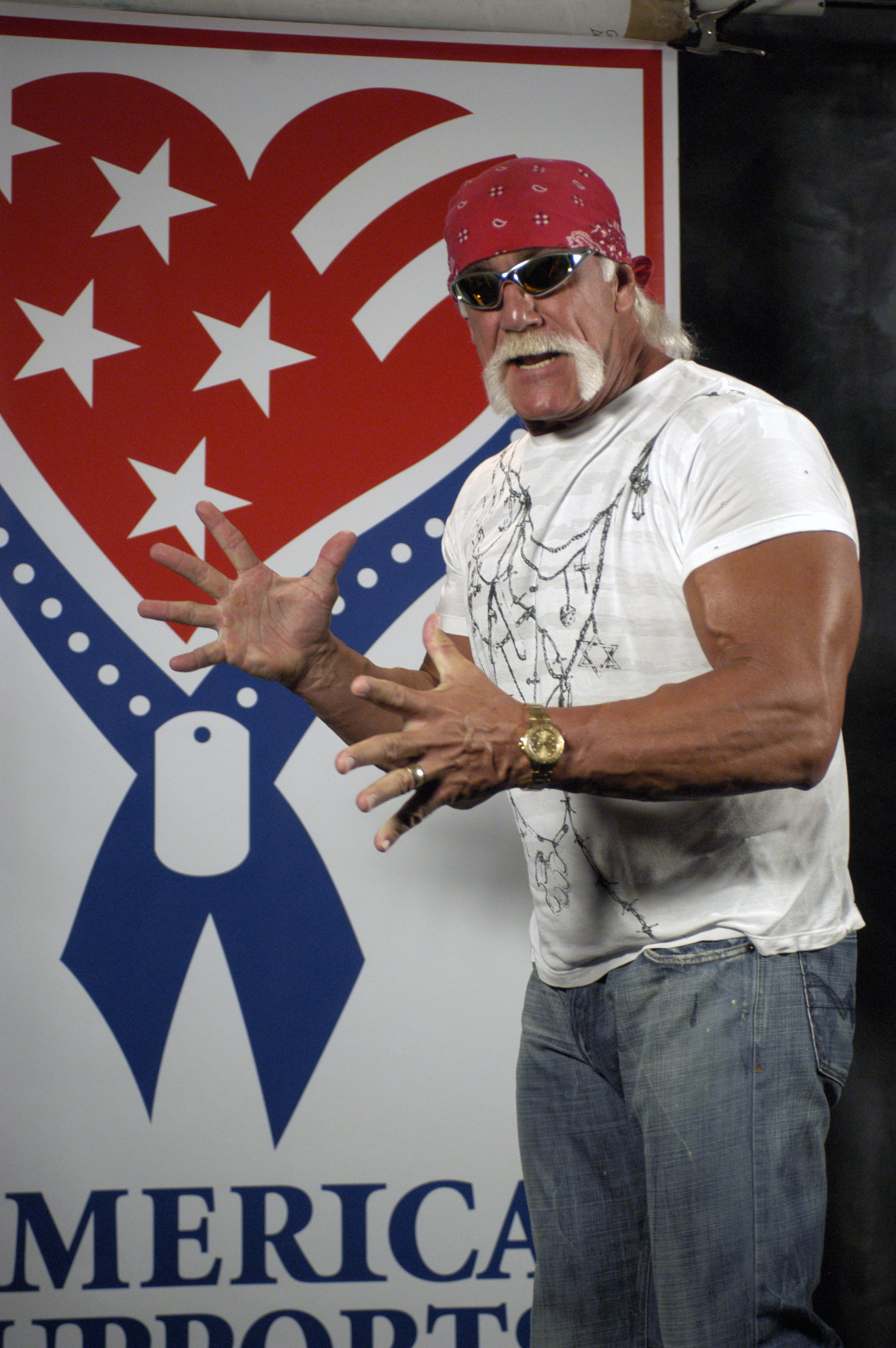
Hulk Hogan, who captained The Hulkamaniacs at Survivor Series

The main event was a third Survivor Series match between The Hulkamaniacs (WWF World Heavyweight Champion Hulk Hogan, WWF Tag Team Champions Demolition (Ax and Smash) and Jake Roberts and Million Dollar Team (Ted DiBiase, Powers of Pain (The Warlord and The Barbarian) and Zeus). Zeus shoved the referee at the 3:21 minute mark, so he was disqualified and got eliminated, leaving Million Dollar Team with three members. Ax and Warlord battled each other. Ax dominated Warlord until Powers of Pain's manager Mr. Fuji distracted him. Warlord took advantage and pinned Ax to eliminate him, leaving Hulkamaniacs with three members to even the score. Ax's Demolition partner Smash entered the match and battled it out with Warlord's Powers of Pain partner Barbarian. Smash tried to take revenge of Ax's elimination from Barbarian but was pinned after a flying clothesline, getting eliminated and leaving Hulkamaniacs with two members – Jake Roberts and Hulk Hogan. Warlord and Barbarian double-teamed Hogan, so they were disqualified and eliminated, leaving Million Dollar Team's captain Ted DiBiase as the only member remaining in the match. Roberts got the upper hand on DiBiase until DiBiase's manager Virgil distracted Roberts. With his feet on the ropes for leverage, DiBiase pinned and eliminated Roberts. It all came down to the team captains, with Hogan hitting a leg drop on DiBiase, pinning him to win the match and become the sole survivor for his team.

The fourth Survivor Series match was between The Rude Brood (Rick Rude, Mr. Perfect and The Fabulous Rougeaus (Jacques and Raymond Rougeau) and Roddy's Rowdies (Roddy Piper, Jimmy Snuka and The Bushwhackers (Bushwhacker Butch and Bushwhacker Luke). The high-flying Jimmy Snuka and Jacques Rougeau began the match with Snuka eliminating Jacques with a Superfly Splash, leaving The Rude Brood with three members. Jacques' brother and Fabulous Rougeaus partner Raymond battled opposing team captain Roddy Piper. Piper hit Raymond with a piledriver and pinned Raymond to eliminate him, leaving Rude Brood with only two members – Mr. Perfect and team captain Rick Rude. Perfect had been pushed as an undefeated wrestler since joining WWF in 1988. He pinned Bushwhacker Butch with a roll-up to eliminate him, leaving Rowdy's Rowdies with three members. Butch's Bushwhackers partner Bushwhacker Luke battled Rude, but was hit with a Rude Awakening and got pinned, getting eliminated and leaving Rowdy's Rowdies with two members. With both teams down to two members captains Rude and Piper battled each other until both were counted-out, leaving only Perfect from The Rude Brood and Snuka from Roddy's Rowdies. Snuka used his high-flying techniques on Perfect but was unable to pin him. Perfect hit Snuka a Perfectplex to win the match and become the sole survivor for The Rude Brood.

The fifth Survivor Series match was between the Ultimate Warriors (WWF Intercontinental Heavyweight Champion Ultimate Warrior, The Rockers (Shawn Michaels and Marty Jannetty) and Jim Neidhart) and The Heenan Family (manager Bobby Heenan, The Colossal Connection (André the Giant and Haku) and Arn Anderson). Arn Anderson's Brain Busters partner Tully Blanchard was originally scheduled to be a part of The Heenan Family but was fired from the WWF on November 1 for failing a drug test. He was replaced by Bobby Heenan. At first, only Neidhart, Jannetty and Michaels were introduced for the face team, and as soon as the Rockers entered the ring, Neidhart attacked Heenan while Michaels and Jannetty went after Anderson and Haku. André went after the faces, attacking at will until Warrior ran out, jumped into the ring and, after sending him reeling with a series of clotheslines, knocked André to the floor. André was counted out at the 26-second mark, giving Warrior's team a quick 4-3 advantage. Later, Neidhart and Anderson were brawling when, after Anderson was knocked to the floor, Haku snuck up from behind and struck Neidhart with a thrust kick to score the pin. Anderson and Haku used a series of double-team moves to wear down Janetty, and eventually, Heenan was tagged in to score the easy pin and give the Heenan Family a 3–2 edge. After Haku missed with a flying crossbody, Michaels used a crossbody of his own to pin Haku. At this point, Anderson began showing signs of frustration with Heenan but was still able to eliminate Michaels after hitting him with a Spinebuster. Anderson held a short-lived advantage over Warrior, but the beginning of the end for the heels came when Warrior whipped Anderson into Heenan (who was standing on the apron), knocking the latter to the floor. Warrior pinned Anderson after hitting him with a gorilla press drop–big splash combination. As Heenan began regaining his senses and arguing with Anderson, thinking him to be walking out on the match, Warrior snuck around ringside and snuck up on Heenan, who realized what had happened. Warrior grabbed Heenan, whipped him across the ring and after knocking him down with a shoulder tackle, hit him with a big splash to score the pin and become the sole survivor for his team. Warrior, after briefly posing in the ring with his Intercontinental Heavyweight Championship belt, knocked down a groggy Heenan in the aisle, shortly before the pay-per-view signed off.

== Aftermath ==
The main event confrontation between Hulk Hogan and Zeus was set up for a special late-December pay-per-view event called No Holds Barred: The Match/The Movie, in which actor Tommy Lister – in his "Zeus" character – was paired with Randy Savage (his tag-team partner from SummerSlam 1989) and Hogan and Brutus "the Barber" Beefcake were reunited for a special tag team steel cage match, which Hogan and Beefcake won.

Arn Anderson's and Tully Blanchard's final WWF appearance would be the following Saturday (November 25, 1989, taped October 31, 1989) on Saturday Night's Main Event in a best two out of three falls match against The Rockers. Heenan "fired" his team for not following his direction and left ringside while Anderson/Blanchard lost their match. Due to the failed drug test, WCW did not hire Blanchard but did bring Anderson back and appeared on WCW television two weeks after his final WWF appearance.

Ultimate Warrior was successful in the WWF's mid-card division in 1989, so his match at Survivor Series was run last to give the event a Warrior-themed ending, although Hogan's match was promoted as the main event contest. The biggest match of Warrior's career was at WrestleMania VI where he defeated Hulk Hogan to win the WWF World Heavyweight Championship in a title vs. title match in which Warrior's WWF Intercontinental Heavyweight Championship was also on the line.

André the Giant and Haku had teamed together occasionally prior to the 1989 Survivor Series as members of the Heenan Family, but this was their first high-profile match as a tag team. After Survivor Series, the two formally formed a tag team known as The Colossal Connection, in part to fill a void in the Heenan Family left by the imminent departure of Anderson and Blanchard, but also to prolong the ailing Andre's career – the effects of his real-life acromegaly were starting to take their toll – by including him in a team in which the younger, healthy Haku would handle most of the wrestling. On December 13, 1989, André and Haku would win the WWF Tag Team Championship by defeating Demolition at a television taping in Huntsville, Alabama, and would hold on to the titles until Demolition gained revenge at WrestleMania VI, defeating The Colossal Connection and setting in motion André's face turn in what was the final WWF match of his career.

== Home media and streaming ==
The event was released on VHS by Coliseum Video in the United States and in 1991 by Silver Vision in the United Kingdom. The home video version saw the event edited down to two hours. The cover art on the video also erroneously labeled Barry Windham as a member of The Kings Court team, despite having been replaced by Earthquake. In a similar manner, Tully Blanchard is wrong listed as a participant in the main event.

In July 2005, it was re-released on DVD in the United Kingdom as part of Silver Vision's Tagged Classics range, and was paired with Survivor Series 1990. This DVD set was not released in the USA.

In 2014, the event was included on the WWE's streaming platform the WWE Network as part of its launch and remained on the service until the platform closed. In November 2025, WWE uploaded the event to stream freely on their WWE Vault YouTube channel.

== Results ==
No.	Results	Stipulations	Times
1^{D}	Boris Zhukov defeated Paul Roma	Singles match	—
2	The Dream Team (Dusty Rhodes, Brutus Beefcake, The Red Rooster, and Tito Santana) defeated The Enforcers (Big Boss Man, Bad News Brown, Rick Martel, and The Honky Tonk Man) (with Jimmy Hart and Slick)	4-on-4 Survivor Series match^{Eliminations}	22:02
3	The King's Court (Randy Savage, Canadian Earthquake, Dino Bravo, and Greg Valentine) (with Jimmy Hart and Queen Sherri) defeated The 4x4s: (Jim Duggan, Bret Hart, Ronnie Garvin, and Hercules)	4-on-4 Survivor Series match^{Eliminations}	23:25
4	The Hulkamaniacs (Hulk Hogan, Jake Roberts, Ax, and Smash) defeated The Million Dollar Team (Ted DiBiase, The Warlord, The Barbarian, and Zeus) (with Virgil and Mr. Fuji)	4-on-4 Survivor Series match^{Eliminations}	27:32
5	The Rude Brood (Rick Rude, Mr. Perfect, Jacques, and Raymond Rougeau) (with The Genius and Jimmy Hart) defeated Roddy's Rowdies (Roddy Piper, Jimmy Snuka, Bushwhacker Luke, and Bushwhacker Butch)	4-on-4 Survivor Series match^{Eliminations}	21:27
6	The Ultimate Warriors (Ultimate Warrior, Jim Neidhart, Shawn Michaels, and Marty Jannetty) defeated The Heenan Family (Bobby Heenan, André the Giant, Haku, and Arn Anderson)	4-on-4 Survivor Series match^{Eliminations}	20:28
D / – this was a dark match

=== Survivor Series matches ===
^1

Eliminated	Wrestler	Eliminated by	Method	Time
1	Tito Santana	Rick Martel	Pinfall	9:15
2	Bad News Brown	N/A	Countout	15:26
3	The Honky Tonk Man	Brutus Beefcake	Pinfall	17:24
4	Rick Martel	Brutus Beefcake	Pinfall	20:13
5	The Red Rooster	The Big Boss Man	Pinfall	21:00
6	The Big Boss Man	Dusty Rhodes	Pinfall	22:02
Survivors:	Dusty Rhodes and Brutus Beefcake			

^2

Eliminated	Wrestler	Eliminated by	Method	Time
1	Hercules	The Canadian Earthquake	Pinfall	3:57
2	Greg Valentine	Jim Duggan	Pinfall	7:32
3	Ronnie Garvin	Dino Bravo	Pinfall	11:17
4	Bret Hart	Randy Savage	Pinfall	19:06
5	Jim Duggan	N/A	Countout	23:25
Survivors:	Randy Savage, The Canadian Earthquake, and Dino Bravo			

^3

Eliminated	Wrestler	Eliminated by	Method	Time
1	Zeus	N/A	Disqualification	3:21
2	Ax	The Warlord	Pinfall	9:50
3	Smash	The Barbarian	Pinfall	13:42
4	The Warlord	N/A	Double disqualification	19:51
4	The Barbarian	N/A	Double disqualification	19:51
6	Jake Roberts	Ted DiBiase	Pinfall	23:42
7	Ted DiBiase	Hulk Hogan	Pinfall	27:32
Sole Survivor:	Hulk Hogan			

^4

Eliminated	Wrestler	Eliminated by	Method	Time
1	Jacques Rougeau	Jimmy Snuka	Pinfall	4:01
2	Raymond Rougeau	Roddy Piper	Pinfall	7:30
3	Bushwhacker Butch	Mr Perfect	Pinfall	10:46
4	Bushwhacker Luke	Rick Rude	Pinfall	12:14
5	Rick Rude	N/A	Double countout	18:35
5	Roddy Piper	N/A	Double countout	18:35
7	Jimmy Snuka	Mr. Perfect	Pinfall	21:27
Sole Survivor:	Mr. Perfect			

^5

Eliminated	Wrestler	Eliminated by	Method	Time
1	André the Giant	N/A	Countout	0:27
2	Jim Neidhart	Haku	Pinfall	3:32
3	Marty Jannetty	Bobby Heenan	Pinfall	8:53
4	Haku	Shawn Michaels	Pinfall	12:54
5	Shawn Michaels	Arn Anderson	Pinfall	15:47
6	Arn Anderson	Ultimate Warrior	Pinfall	18:19
7	Bobby Heenan	Ultimate Warrior	Pinfall	20:28
Sole Survivor:	Ultimate Warrior			
