= WM6 =

WM6 may refer to:

- WrestleMania VI, a professional wrestling pay-per-view
- Windows Mobile 6, a mobile operating system
