= Royal Rumble (1990) =

World Wrestling Federation pay-per-view event

- Promotional poster featuring various WWF wrestlers
- Promotion: World Wrestling Federation
- Date: January 21, 1990
- City: Orlando, Florida
- Venue: Orlando Arena
- Attendance: 16,000
- Tagline: Every Man for Himself

Pay-per-view chronology
← Previous; No Holds Barred: The Match/The Movie	Next → WrestleMania VI

Royal Rumble chronology
← Previous; 1989	Next → 1991

The 1990 Royal Rumble was a professional wrestling pay-per-view (PPV) event produced by the World Wrestling Federation (WWF, renamed WWE in 2002). It was the third annual Royal Rumble event and took place on January 21, 1990, at the Orlando Arena in Orlando, Florida. It centered on the men's Royal Rumble match, a modified 30-man battle royal in which the participants enter at timed intervals instead of all beginning in the ring at the same time.

Six matches were contested at the event, including one dark match. The main event was the 1990 Royal Rumble match, which was won by WWF Champion Hulk Hogan, who last eliminated Mr. Perfect. The undercard matches saw Jim Duggan defeat Big Boss Man by disqualification, Ronnie Garvin defeat Greg Valentine in a submission match, and The Bushwhackers (Luke and Butch) defeat The Fabulous Rougeaus (Jacques and Raymond).

== Production ==
=== Background ===
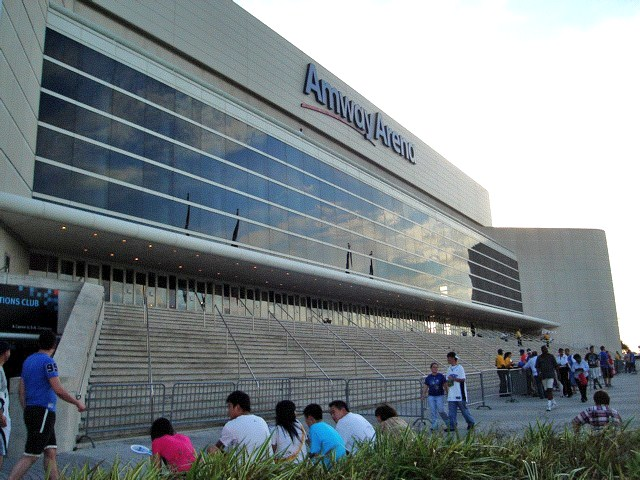
The third annual Royal Rumble event was held in Orlando, Florida at the Orlando Arena (pictured in 2010 after it had since been renamed as Amway Arena).

The Royal Rumble is an annual professional wrestling event, produced every January by the World Wrestling Federation (WWF, renamed WWE in 2002) since 1988; that first event was a television special before it became an annual pay-per-view (PPV) beginning in 1989. It is one of the promotion's original four PPVs, along with WrestleMania, SummerSlam, and Survivor Series, referred to as the "Big Four". It is named after and centered on the men's Royal Rumble match, a modified battle royal in which the participants enter at timed intervals instead of all beginning in the ring at the same time. The previous year's event established the tradition of the match generally featuring 30 wrestlers. The third Royal Rumble event was scheduled to be held on January 21, 1990, at the Orlando Arena in Orlando, Florida.

=== Storylines ===
The Bushwhackers (Bushwhacker Butch and Bushwhacker Luke) made their World Wrestling Federation debut in Madison Square Garden on December 30, 1988, defeating The Bolsheviks (Nikolai Volkoff and Boris Zhukov). They got involved in a feud with The Bolsheviks, which was to be settled at WrestleMania V. Bolsheviks missed the event, however, so they were replaced by The Fabulous Rougeaus (Jacques Rougeau and Raymond Rougeau), whom Bushwhackers beat. Bushwhackers and Rougeaus continued to feud with each other for the rest of the year, culminating in a tag team match at Royal Rumble 1990.

Greg Valentine and Ronnie Garvin had been feuding since a match on December 30, 1988, in Madison Square Garden (MSG) which Valentine won by grabbing the tights for leverage. On the April 22, 1989 episode of Superstars, Garvin defeated Valentine in a match. On the following edition of Superstars, they both faced each other in a retirement match where the loser could not wrestle anymore in WWF. Valentine won the match, sending Garvin into retirement. In retirement, Garvin took up other positions in the WWF; first he became a referee but he was suspended after disqualifying Valentine in a match against Jimmy Snuka, and later a ring announcer at SummerSlam 1989, a position he used to berate and belittle his erstwhile rival. Valentine was so irate that he demanded for Garvin to be re-instated as a professional wrestler and his request was accepted. At Survivor Series, they both battled in a match on opposing teams.

Other wrestlers in World Wrestling Federation – including WWF World Heavyweight Champion Hulk Hogan and the other champions – were prepared to participate in the 1990 Royal Rumble match. Many tag team wrestlers, mid-card wrestlers and main event wrestlers were allotted their entry numbers to participate in this match. Prior to the match, it was mentioned that WWF President Jack Tunney had allotted "extra security" to the drawing process. Ted Dibiase, who had cheated to obtain a late number in the previous year's event, eventually revealed to Gene Okerlund that he had drawn #1. By contrast, Mr. Perfect revealed that he had obtained the "perfect draw" - #30.

== Event ==
=== Preliminary matches ===
Before the event aired live on pay-per-view (PPV), Paul Roma defeated The Brooklyn Brawler in a dark match. The first match was a tag team match between The Bushwhackers (Bushwhacker Butch and Bushwhacker Luke) and The Fabulous Rougeaus (Jacques Rougeau and Raymond Rougeau). Raymond applied a sleeper hold on Butch but Butch dropped him in the corner. Raymond tagged Jacques. Butch and Luke both clotheslined Raymond and went for a battering ram on Jacques but Jacques slipped out. Jacques and Luke traded punches with each other until Luke bit him. Jacques ducked a clothesline by Luke and Raymond was instead hit with the move. Jacques began posing until Butch attacked him from behind. The Rougeaus did illegal double-teaming on Luke. Raymond tagged in and got a near-fall on Luke. Luke tried to get a tag but Raymond attacked Butch. The Rougeaus double-teamed Luke again. Raymond Irish whipped Luke into a forearm smash by Jacques to get another near-fall. Jacques tagged in and hit a back elbow on Luke. He hit Luke with two Hotshots. Raymond applied a chinlock but Luke bit out. Jacques applied an abdominal stretch on Luke and grabbed the ropes for leverage. Raymond tagged in and applied a chinlock on Luke again. Jacques tagged in and went for a diving splash but Luke hit Jacques with his knees. Butch got tagged in. Rougeaus tried to hit Butch but he sidestepped and they got Irish whipped into each other. The Bushwhackers went for a battering ram on Raymond but the Rougeaus' manager Jimmy Hart grabbed Luke's foot. Luke pulled Hart into the ring, causing the distraction. The Rougeaus took advantage and nailed the Bushwhackers with double dropkicks. Jacques rolled up Butch for a near-fall. Raymond slapped the Boston crab on Butch for Jacques to hit a knee drop on Butch. Luke tripped Jacques. Raymond tried to help his brother but the Bushwhackers hit the Rougeaus with the Battering ram and Butch pinned Jacques to win the match.

The second match was between Brutus Beefcake and The Genius. Genius became serious as the bell rang and he hit Beefcake with an eye rake. Beefcake got up and hit Genius an inverted atomic drop. Genius went down to the floor to recover. As he got back into the ring, he pounded on Beefcake but missed a charge. Beefcake hit Genius an Irish whip. Genius went to the floor but came back into the ring with a dropkick for a near-fall. A crucifix pin on Beefcake got another near-fall for Genius. Beefcake nailed Genius back and applied a Barber's Chair but Genius elbowed out of it. Genius applied a headlock but Beefcake pushed him into the referee. Genius tried to hit an Irish whip on Beefcake but Beefcake reversed it into a Barber's Chair. Genius fell to the mat, but the referee was knocked out, so Beefcake could not be awarded with the win. He got his scissors and tried to cut Genius' hair with it, until Mr. Perfect came out and hit Beefcake with a Perfectplex. The referee got up and disqualified both Beefcake and Genius. Perfect brought a chair into the ring and nailed Beefcake in the ribs with it.

The third match was a Submission match between Ronnie Garvin and Greg Valentine. Garvin began hitting Valentine with chops. Valentine hit a headbutt low blow on Garvin. They both exchanged blows with each other before Garvin went for a piledriver but Valentine backdropped out of it. Valentine used a Heart Breaker on Garvin and went for a figure four leglock but Garvin kicked out of it. Garvin did a roll-up but due to pinfalls were not counted in this match. Valentine hit an elbow drop on Garvin and applied the figure four leglock. Valentine hit a Canadian backbreaker rack but Garvin didn't submit. Valentine hit another elbow drop and went for the figure four leglock again but Garvin kicked out and chopped him in the corner. Garvin applied the Indian deathlock on Valentine but Valentine caught the ropes. They battled each other on the floor where Garvin went for a piledriver but Valentine backdropped out of it. In the ring, Garvin reversed an Irish whip but missed a charge. Valentine applied Garvin's submission maneuver, Hammer Jammer on Garvin. Valentine pounded in the corner. Garvin fell near Valentine's manager Jimmy Hart. Valentine applied the figure four leglock on Garvin. Garvin released the hold but Valentine went for another figure four leglock, but Garvin blocked it with an inside cradle. Garvin slammed Valentine down on the mat. He untied the Heart Breaker but Valentine pulled him outside the ring. Garvin tied Valentine in the ropes and Hart tried to untangle him but got pulled by Garvin. Garvin threatened Hart with the Heart Breaker but instead hit Valentine with it and applied the Hammer Jammer on Valentine, who submitted.

The fourth match was Jim Duggan vs. Big Boss Man. Boss Man heavily pounded on Duggan in the beginning but Duggan countered with a clothesline to the floor. Boss Man caught Duggan and brought him to the floor. Duggan punched back but was thrown into the ringpost. Boss Man eventually missed a charge and got crashed into the ringpost. Duggan pounded on his hurt shoulder. They both went to the ring where Boss Man reversed an Irish whip by Duggan. He splashed Duggan in the corner. Boss Man followed it up with an enzuigiri. He soon began hitting Duggan's head into the turnbuckle but Duggan Irish whipped Boss Man into the corner. Duggan began to take control of the match until Slick interfered in the match, which gave Boss Man a comeback in the match. Boss Man got a near-fall on Duggan after a knee drop. He locked in a bear hug. Duggan tried to escape by hitting headbutts but Boss Man fell on top of him near the ropes. Boss Man pounded on Duggan in the corner but Duggan clotheslined him. Duggan drove Boss Man into the corner for a ten-count punch but missed a charge in the corner and was clotheslined by Boss Man. Boss Man went for a big splash but Duggan moved out of the way. Slick grabbed Duggan up against the ropes as Boss Man charged Duggan but Duggan moved out of the way and Boss Man accidentally nailed Slick. However, Slick was able to give Boss Man a nightstick. Slick tried to distract the referee, but the referee saw Boss Man hitting Duggan with a nightstick. Referee disqualified Boss Man and Duggan was announced the winner.

Other on-screen personnel
Role:	Name:
Commentator	Tony Schiavone
Commentator	Jesse Ventura
Interviewer	Gene Okerlund
Interviewer	Sean Mooney
Ring announcer	Howard Finkel
Official	Tony Garea
Official	Pat Patterson
Referees	Danny Davis
Referees	Earl Hebner
Referees	Joey Marella
Referees	Shane Stevens

=== Main event ===
The main event was the 30-man Royal Rumble match. Ted DiBiase entered at #1 and Koko B. Ware entered at #2. The two began beating each other until DiBiase got the best of Koko by backdropping him over the top rope, leading to Koko's elimination. Next was one half of The Rockers, Marty Jannetty but was immediately attacked by DiBiase. Jannetty hit with dropkicks but eventually ran into a boot to the head. DiBiase hit Jannetty with a clothesline. He then climbed the middle rope but was caught by Jannetty. Jannetty tried to roll-up DiBiase but DiBiase held on. Jannetty missed a crossbody on DiBiase, getting eliminated over the top rope. Jake Roberts entered at #4, leading to DiBiase and Roberts hurting each other, due to the hatred with one another. "Macho King" Randy Savage drew in #5 and attacked Roberts first. Savage and DiBiase double-teamed Roberts until #6 entrant Roddy Piper came out to help Roberts. Piper and Roberts both began attacking DiBiase and Savage and the two teams saved each other from getting eliminated until one half of The Powers of Pain, The Warlord entering at #7 attacked both Piper and Roberts. Warlord beat on Piper for a while until DiBiase and Savage tried to eliminate Roberts. Piper broke free of Warlord and saved Roberts from elimination.

One half of The Hart Foundation, Bret Hart entered at #8, attacking Warlord. Piper and Hart double clotheslined Warlord while DiBiase and Savage were still trying to eliminate Roberts. Hart began beating Savage and Warlord went to save Savage from Hart. Piper and Roberts double-teamed DiBiase. Warlord tried to eliminate Hart until #9 entrant Bad News Brown assaulted Hart. Roberts went for the DDT on DiBiase near the ropes until Savage clotheslined Roberts over the top rope, eliminating him. DiBiase went out for Piper, but Piper got the best of DiBiase, trying to eliminate him until Savage saved DiBiase again. Dusty Rhodes entered at #10 and hit Savage with bionic elbows. Savage tried to charge Rhodes over the top rope but Rhodes countered and eliminated Savage by throwing him over the top rope. A turning point occurred in the match as #11 entrant, one half of WWF Tag Team Champions The Colossal Connection, André the Giant joined the match. Warlord went after André and was immediately thrown over the top rope, getting eliminated.

Piper and Rhodes fought back on André, while Brown and DiBiase tried to eliminate Hart. Red Rooster entered at #12 and began fighting with Rhodes. Meanwhile, Brown tried to eliminate Piper but was thrown out. This made Brown angry. Although he was eliminated, he came back into the ring and dumped Piper over the top rope. They continued fighting backstage. Dusty Rhodes tried to eliminate Ted DiBiase, but Virgil, Ted DiBiase's manager, pushed him back into the ring. Ax, one half of Demolition entered at #13 while André eliminated Rooster. Ax pounded on André while Hart and Rhodes double-teamed DiBiase. André was in trouble as he was tied in the ropes by Ax and Rhodes. André's tag team championship partner Haku entered in #14 and saved André from getting eliminated. Rhodes beat on Haku while entering at #15, Ax's Demolition partner, Smash came out to rescue him. This led to a Demolition and Colossal Connection battle. One half of the Twin Towers, Akeem entered at #16 while Rhodes eliminated Hart. Demolition nailed Haku with a double shoulder block and did the same to André, eliminating him from the match. They tried to eliminate Haku too, but André punched Ax in the face to stop the elimination and allow Haku to get back into the ring. DiBiase, who had been in the match for 20 minutes, was now going to get eliminated by Demolition but broke free until Jimmy Snuka entered at #17.

Snuka fought with Akeem and eliminated him. Dino Bravo entered at #18. Bravo and Haku attacked Snuka, but Snuka attacked both men in return. The Canadian Earthquake entered at #19, eliminating Rhodes and then Ax. The other half of Hart Foundation, Jim Neidhart entered at #20 and battled with Earthquake, trying to eliminate him. Haku and Smash joined Neidhart to eliminate but was still difficult to eliminate the 400-pounder. DiBiase and Snuka also came out to help. Bravo also joined them. Finally, these six men eliminated Earthquake. Earthquake had a short argument with his tag-team partner Bravo, who was very happy after eliminating him. WWF Intercontinental Heavyweight Champion Ultimate Warrior entered at #21 and the powerhouse began dominating the match. Immediately after entering, Warrior eliminated Bravo and nailed everybody. Rick Martel entered at #22, showing his narcissistic attitude. Haku eliminated Smash. Neidhart tried to eliminate Martel, but Martel slid into the ring from under the apron. Tito Santana entered at #23 and immediately nailed Martel. Santana tried to eliminate Martel but Martel raked Santana. Haku was hit with a clothesline by Warrior while DiBiase piledrivered Snuka. The Honky Tonk Man entered at #24. Martel eliminated Neidhart with some aid by Warrior and DiBiase as well. Warrior reversed an Irish whip by DiBiase and clotheslined him over the top rope. DiBiase broke Mr. Perfect's longevity record of staying in a Royal Rumble match with 44:47.

WWF World Heavyweight Champion Hulk Hogan entered at #25. Immediately after entering, Hogan eliminated Snuka and then Haku. Santana tried to eliminate Martel but Warrior tripped Santana and eliminated him. Honky attacked Hogan but it was for no use as Hogan eliminated Honky. The other half of The Rockers, Shawn Michaels entered at #26. Michaels was immediately eliminated by Warrior, then Warrior threw Martel out. It was now WWF World Heavyweight vs. IC Heavyweight Champion – Hogan vs. Warrior left in the ring. After looking at each other for a little bit, both powerhouses got in each other's faces, then each bounced off the rope and crashed into one another, but nobody moved, then after a criss-cross, Hogan missed a clothesline and they clotheslined each other. The Barbarian entered at #27 and leveled Hogan with a big boot. "Ravishing" Rick Rude entered at #28 before the clock went off and went after Warrior. Barbarian and Rude tried to eliminate Hogan, but the Warrior saved Hogan from being eliminated. Then a Hogan clothesline eliminated the Warrior with help from Barbarian and Rude. Warrior then came back into the ring and attacked both Barbarian and Rude before going backstage. Hercules entered at #29 and teamed with Hogan to battle Barbarian and Rude. The last entrant, Mr. Perfect entered and began stomping Hogan.

This made Hogan, Rude, Barbarian, Hercules and Perfect, the final five men. Meanwhile, a miscommunication problem occurred between Barbarian and Rude. Hercules took advantage and eliminated Barbarian. This made it the final four – Hogan, Rude, Hercules and Perfect. Hercules was eliminated by Rude, leading to Hogan, Rude and Perfect as the final three. Rude and Perfect double-teamed Hogan. Perfect held Hogan for a Rude forearm but Hogan ducked and Perfect was sent out to the apron. While on the apron Hogan Irish whipped Rude and as Perfect was pulling himself back up he accidentally pulled the ropes down, letting Rude fly down to the floor. After a short argument between Rude and Perfect, Rude went backstage. This led to the final two – Hogan and Perfect. Hogan grabbed Perfect back in the ring but received a clothesline by Perfect. Perfect hit Hogan with a Perfect-Plex but Hogan "hulked up" and threw Perfect into the ring post. Hogan connected with clotheslines and threw Perfect over the turnbuckle and across the ring post to the floor, to win the 1990 Royal Rumble match.

== Aftermath ==
Several of the Royal Rumble events were used to build interest in WrestleMania VI, the WWF's next big supercard. Gaining the most interest was a confrontation between WWF World Heavyweight Champion Hulk Hogan and WWF Intercontinental Heavyweight Champion Ultimate Warrior; both men agreed each had something to prove following their encounter, and a match was signed for WrestleMania VI, to be held at the Toronto Skydome. Both wrestlers agreed to a title vs. title match, where one wrestler could walk out with both titles. Prior to then, Hogan focused on his feud with Mr. Perfect, while Ultimate Warrior defended his Intercontinental Heavyweight Championship primarily against Dino Bravo, with Hogan frequently appearing in the Ultimate Warrior-Bravo matches to nullify Earthquake's appearances in Bravo's corner.

WWF Tag Team Champions the Colossal Connection (André the Giant and Haku) continued to defend their titles, largely against Demolition (Ax and Smash), the team they won the belts from; the Hart Foundation and the Rockers were occasional opponents. During this time, Haku was doing most of the wrestling as André's health was declining and he only entered the ring usually only for the finish. A final rematch was scheduled for WrestleMania VI.

Following the confrontation between Dusty Rhodes and Sapphire, and "Macho King" Randy Savage and Sensational Sherri during "The Brother Love Show", an inter-gender match between the two was signed. Prior to that, Savage made one final bid for Hogan's WWF World Heavyweight Championship, facing his sometimes friend and more frequent enemy on The Main Event, aired in February; with Buster Douglas as the referee, Hogan gained a pinfall victory in their last WWF match against each other, with Hogan gaining a further parting shot when Douglas slugged Savage following a post-match argument.

"Rowdy" Roddy Piper and Bad News Brown's encounter in the Royal Rumble match led to a one-on-one match between the two at WrestleMania VI, which resulted in a double count-out. The Royal Rumble was the last pay-per-view event where The Big Boss Man competed as a heel; shortly after the Royal Rumble, Bossman refused to assist "Million Dollar Man" Ted DiBiase in his feud with Jake "The Snake" Roberts, fired Slick as his manager and made former rival Hogan his closest ally.

This was the last WWF pay-per-view event commentated by Tony Schiavone, as he left the company shortly afterwards. He went on to work for World Championship Wrestling, which became WWF's chief rival during the 1990s, until its demise in 2001, and had a short-lived stint with Total Nonstop Action Wrestling in 2003 before leaving the sport until 2019, when he became an announcer for All Elite Wrestling. Gorilla Monsoon would resume the lead announcing duties at the WWF's following pay-per-view, WrestleMania VI.

== Home media and streaming ==
The event was released on VHS in 1990 by Coliseum Video in the United States and in February 1992 by Silver Vision in the United Kingdom. Hulk Hogan was removed from the front cover on the British home video.

In May 2004, it was re-released on DVD in the United Kingdom as part of Silver Vision's Tagged Classics range, and was paired with Royal Rumble 1989.This DVD set was not released in the USA.

In 2014, the event was included on the WWE's streaming platform the WWE Network as part of its launch and remained on the service until the platform closed in 2026. As of October 2026, subscribers in multiple territories, including the US, Canada and the UK, can stream the event on Netflix, thanks to the WWE's ten-year agreement with the company.

In Januar 2025, WWE uploaded the Royal Rumble match to stream freely on their WWE Vault YouTube channel.

== Results ==
No.	Results	Stipulations	Times
1^{D}	Paul Roma defeated The Brooklyn Brawler	Singles match	—
2	The Bushwhackers (Luke and Butch) defeated The Fabulous Rougeaus (Jacques and Raymond) (with Jimmy Hart)	Tag team match	13:35
3	Brutus Beefcake vs. The Genius ended in a double disqualification	Singles match	11:07
4	Ron Garvin defeated Greg Valentine (with Jimmy Hart)	Submission match	16:55
5	Jim Duggan defeated Big Boss Man (with Slick) by disqualification	Singles match	10:22
6	Hulk Hogan won by last eliminating Mr. Perfect	30-man Royal Rumble match	58:46
D / – this was a dark match

=== Royal Rumble entrances and eliminations ===
A new entrant came out approximately every 2 minutes.

Draw	Entrant	Order	Eliminated by	Time	Eliminations
1	Ted DiBiase	18	Ultimate Warrior	44:47	4
2	Koko B. Ware	1	Ted DiBiase	01:36	0
3	Marty Jannetty	2	Ted DiBiase	01:35	0
4	Jake Roberts	3	Randy Savage	10:03	0
5	Randy Savage	4	Dusty Rhodes	10:10	1
6	Roddy Piper	7	Bad News Brown	12:20	1
7	The Warlord	5	André the Giant	08:16	0
8	Bret Hart	9	Dusty Rhodes	16:16	0
9	Bad News Brown	6	Roddy Piper	06:04	1
10	Dusty Rhodes	12	Canadian Earthquake	18:18	2
11	André the Giant	10	Ax & Smash	10:16	2
12	The Red Rooster	8	André the Giant	01:58	0
13	Ax	13	Canadian Earthquake	12:50	1
14	Haku	20	Hulk Hogan	22:31	2
15	Smash	16	Haku	15:01	2
16	Akeem	11	Jimmy Snuka	02:31	0
17	Jimmy Snuka	19	Hulk Hogan	17:03	2
18	Dino Bravo	15	Ultimate Warrior	06:13	1
19	Canadian Earthquake	14	Jim Neidhart, Haku, Smash, Jimmy Snuka, Dino Bravo, and Ted DiBiase	02:31	2
20	Jim Neidhart	17	Ultimate Warrior, Ted Dibiase, and Rick Martel	08:42	1
21	Ultimate Warrior	25	Hulk Hogan, The Barbarian, and Rick Rude	14:29	6
22	Rick Martel	24	Ultimate Warrior	08:14	2
23	Tito Santana	21	Ultimate Warrior and Rick Martel	05:09	0
24	The Honky Tonk Man	22	Hulk Hogan	04:01	0
25	Hulk Hogan	-	Winner	12:49	6
26	Shawn Michaels	23	Ultimate Warrior	00:12	0
27	The Barbarian	26	Hercules	05:47	1
28	Rick Rude	28	Hulk Hogan & Mr. Perfect	06:29	2
29	Hercules	27	Rick Rude	03:02	1
30	Mr. Perfect	29	Hulk Hogan	03:32	1

- Ted DiBiase set a new longevity record by lasting 44:47.
- Bad News Brown was already eliminated when he eliminated Roddy Piper.

== See also ==
- 1990 in professional wrestling
