= Survivor Series (1990) =

World Wrestling Federation pay-per-view event

- Promotional poster
- Promotion: World Wrestling Federation
- Date: November 22, 1990
- City: Hartford, Connecticut
- Venue: Hartford Civic Center
- Attendance: 16,000
- Tagline: The WWF Thanksgiving Night Tradition!

Pay-per-view chronology
| ← Previous; SummerSlam | Next → Royal Rumble |

Survivor Series chronology
| ← Previous; 1989 | Next → 1991 |

The 1990 Survivor Series was a professional wrestling pay-per-view (PPV) event produced by the World Wrestling Federation (WWF, renamed WWE in 2002). It was the fourth annual Survivor Series event and took place on Thanksgiving Day in the United States on Thursday, November 22, 1990, at the Hartford Civic Center in Hartford, Connecticut. The event centered on the Survivor Series match, a tag team elimination match that pits teams of multiple wrestlers against each other. The pay-per-view broadcast consisted of six matches, all of which were Survivor Series matches, and there was also one dark match before the event aired live.

This event is well known for the PPV debut of The Undertaker, who would become one of the most prominent and venerable figures within the WWF. In addition, Sgt. Slaughter, who then portrayed an Iraqi sympathizer, insulted servicemen stationed in Iraq for Thanksgiving during Operation Desert Shield. In an interview, Randy Savage challenged Ultimate Warrior for the WWF World Heavyweight Championship. Haku replaced Rick Rude, who had left the WWF over a pay dispute. In the storyline, he was suspended by WWF President Jack Tunney for insulting the mother of the Big Boss Man. Boris Zhukov replaced Akeem, who had left the WWF in October.

== Production ==
=== Background ===
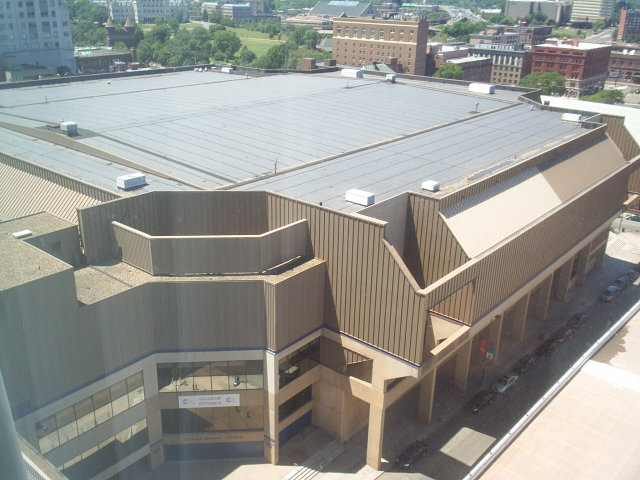
The fourth annual Survivor Series event was held at the Hartford Civic Center in Hartford, Connecticut.

Survivor Series is an annual professional wrestling pay-per-view (PPV) event, produced every November by the World Wrestling Federation (WWF, renamed WWE in 2002) since 1987, held around Thanksgiving in the United States. In what has become the second longest-running PPV event in history (behind WWE's WrestleMania), it is one of the promotion's original four PPVs, along with WrestleMania, Royal Rumble, and SummerSlam; referred to as the "Big Four". Continuing the tradition of the previous years' events, the fourth Survivor Series only featured Survivor Series matches, which are tag team elimination matches. Like the previous three events, the fourth Survivor Series event was scheduled to be held on Thanksgiving Day on Thursday, November 22, 1990, taking place at the Hartford Civic Center in Hartford, Connecticut.

=== Storylines ===
Other on-screen personnel
| Role: | Name: |
|---|---|
| Commentator | Gorilla Monsoon |
| Commentator | "Rowdy" Roddy Piper |
| Interviewer | Gene Okerlund |
| Interviewer | Sean Mooney |
| Ring announcer | Howard Finkel |
| Referee | Earl Hebner |
| Referee | Mike Chioda |
| Referee | Joey Marella |
| Referee | Danny Davis |
| Referee | Shane Stevens |

The card included matches that resulted from scripted storylines. Results were predetermined by WWF's writers, with storylines produced on their weekly television shows.

This was the only Survivor Series to feature a "Grand Finale Match of Survival", wherein the survivors of each announced Survivor Series elimination match would take part in a final elimination match in the main event, split based on their heel-or-face alignments. The match ended with the three-man face team of Ultimate Warrior, Hulk Hogan (the two survivors) and Tito Santana defeating the five-man heel team of Ted DiBiase and the full "Visionaries" team from earlier in the night (Rick Martel, the Warlord, and Power & Glory).

== Aftermath ==
Crowd reaction to the Gobbledy Gooker was extremely negative, with fans loudly booing as the costumed Héctor Guerrero danced in the ring with announcer Gene Okerlund. Although the character made a handful of appearances in taped promos following the Survivor Series, the Gobbledy Gooker soon disappeared and was not mentioned again until the Gimmick Battle Royal at WrestleMania X-Seven. Several years later, WrestleCrap used the name for its "Gooker Award", presented for the worst gimmicks, storylines, or events in wrestling.

Sgt. Slaughter and Randy Savage both challenged Ultimate Warrior for the WWF Championship. Slaughter and his manager, General Adnan, also cut several anti-American, pro-Iraqi promos – all airing at a time when the United States was engaged in Operation Desert Shield, all to build up heat for his match against Warrior at the 1991 Royal Rumble, held two days after the start of the war against Iraq. Slaughter – with help from both Savage and his manager, Sensational Sherri – won the title from Warrior at the Royal Rumble. Warrior defeated Savage in a career-ending match at Wrestlemania VII, after which Savage turned face and reunited with former manager Miss Elizabeth, ultimately winning back the belt a year later at Wrestlemania VIII. Savage and Warrior fought one more time for the title at SummerSlam in a match plagued by interference from Ric Flair and Mr Perfect.

Hogan went on to focus on wrapping up his feud with Earthquake with a series of stretcher matches, which Hogan won, before going on to challenge Slaughter for the WWF title.

Since the formation of Demolition in 1987, they had been compared to the Legion of Doom. The feud between the Legion of Doom and Demolition (which by now was Crush and Smash) continued to rage into the end of 1990, with the Legion of Doom eventually coming out on top (in part because the feud had not had the anticipated intensity due to Ax's reduced role). Demolition's last pay-per-view appearance was at WrestleMania VII, where the team lost to Genichiro Tenryu and Koji Kitao. The Legion of Doom eventually became WWF Tag Team Champions.

== Home Video and Streaming ==
The event was released on home video in 1991 the USA by Coliseum Video and in the UK by Silver Vision. The home video version included several exclusively shot segments, including an introduction from Sean Mooney stood in front of The Giant Egg and a post credit scene with The Bushwhackers and The Gobbledy Gooker.

In July 2005, Silver Vision re-released the event on DVD as part of their Tagged Classics series. This DVD was only available in the United Kingdom and Ireland.

The event was uploaded to the WWE Network when it launched in 2014. In 2024, WWE uploaded the event to stream freely on their WWE Vault YouTube channel.

== Results ==
| No. | Results | Stipulations | Times |
|---|---|---|---|
| 1^{D} | Shane Douglas defeated Buddy Rose | Singles match | — |
| 2 | The Warriors (Ultimate Warrior, Hawk, Animal, and Texas Tornado) defeated The Perfect Team (Mr. Perfect, Ax, Smash, and Crush) (with Bobby Heenan and Mr. Fuji) | 4-on-4 Survivor Series match^{Eliminations} | 14:20 |
| 3 | The Million Dollar Team (Ted DiBiase, The Undertaker, The Honky Tonk Man, and Greg Valentine) (with Virgil, Brother Love, and Jimmy Hart) defeated The Dream Team (Dusty Rhodes, Koko B. Ware, Bret Hart, and Jim Neidhart) (Note: This match was dedicated to Bret Hart's brother Dean, who died the day before.) | 4-on-4 Survivor Series match^{Eliminations} | 13:54 |
| 4 | The Visionaries (Rick Martel, The Warlord, Hercules, and Paul Roma) (with Slick) defeated The Vipers (Jake Roberts, Jimmy Snuka, Shawn Michaels, and Marty Jannetty) | 4-on-4 Survivor Series match^{Eliminations} | 17:42 |
| 5 | The Hulkamaniacs (Hulk Hogan, Jim Duggan, Big Boss Man, and Tugboat) defeated The Natural Disasters (Earthquake, Haku, Dino Bravo, and The Barbarian) (with Jimmy Hart and Bobby Heenan) | 4-on-4 Survivor Series match^{Eliminations} | 14:49 |
| 6 | The Alliance (Nikolai Volkoff, Tito Santana, Luke, and Butch) defeated The Mercenaries (Sgt. Slaughter, Boris Zhukov, Sato, and Tanaka) (with General Adnan and Mr. Fuji) | 4-on-4 Survivor Series match^{Eliminations} | 10:52 |
| 7 | Hulk Hogan, Ultimate Warrior, and Tito Santana defeated Ted DiBiase and The Visionaries (Rick Martel, The Warlord, Hercules, and Paul Roma) (with Virgil and Slick) | 5-on-3 Survivor Series match^{Eliminations} | 9:07 |
D / – this was a dark match

=== Survivor Series matches ===
^1

| Eliminated | Wrestler | Eliminated by | Method | Time |
|---|---|---|---|---|
| 1 | Ax | Ultimate Warrior | Pinfall | 3:23 |
| 2 | Smash | N/A | Disqualification | 7:36 |
| 2 | Crush | N/A | Disqualification | 7:36 |
| 2 | Hawk | N/A | Disqualification | 7:36 |
| 2 | Animal | N/A | Disqualification | 7:36 |
| 6 | The Texas Tornado | Mr. Perfect | Pinfall | 11:02 |
| 7 | Mr. Perfect | Ultimate Warrior | Pinfall | 14:20 |
| Sole Survivor: | Ultimate Warrior | | | |

^2

| Eliminated | Wrestler | Eliminated by | Method | Time |
|---|---|---|---|---|
| 1 | Koko B. Ware | The Undertaker | Pinfall | 1:39 |
| 2 | The Honky Tonk Man | Jim Neidhart | Pinfall | 4:16 |
| 3 | Jim Neidhart | Ted DiBiase | Pinfall | 5:49 |
| 4 | Dusty Rhodes | The Undertaker | Pinfall | 8:26 |
| 5 | The Undertaker | N/A | Countout | 9:17 |
| 6 | Greg Valentine | Bret Hart | Pinfall | 9:57 |
| 7 | Bret Hart | Ted DiBiase | Pinfall | 13:54 |
| Sole Survivor: | Ted DiBiase | | | |

^3

| Eliminated | Wrestler | Eliminated by | Method | Time |
|---|---|---|---|---|
| 1 | Marty Jannetty | The Warlord | Pinfall | 5:03 |
| 2 | Jimmy Snuka | Rick Martel | Pinfall | 9:28 |
| 3 | Shawn Michaels | Paul Roma | Pinfall | 15:40 |
| 4 | Jake Roberts | N/A | Countout | 17:42 |
| Survivors: | Hercules, Paul Roma, Rick Martel and The Warlord (Clean sweep) | | | |

^4

| Eliminated | Wrestler | Eliminated by | Method | Time |
|---|---|---|---|---|
| 1 | Haku | The Big Boss Man | Pinfall | 3:15 |
| 2 | Jim Duggan | N/A | Disqualification | 6:12 |
| 3 | Dino Bravo | Hulk Hogan | Pinfall | 7:59 |
| 4 | Big Boss Man | Earthquake | Pinfall | 9:08 |
| 5 | Tugboat | N/A | Double countout | 11:33 |
| 5 | Earthquake | N/A | Double countout | 11:33 |
| 7 | The Barbarian | Hulk Hogan | Pinfall | 14:49 |
| Sole Survivor: | Hulk Hogan | | | |

^5

| Eliminated | Wrestler | Eliminated by | Method | Time |
|---|---|---|---|---|
| 1 | Boris Zhukov | Tito Santana | Pinfall | 0:48 |
| 2 | Sato | Bushwacker Butch | Pinfall | 1:46 |
| 3 | Tanaka | Tito Santana | Pinfall | 2:13 |
| 4 | Nikolai Volkoff | Sgt. Slaughter | Pinfall | 5:25 |
| 5 | Bushwacker Luke | Sgt. Slaughter | Pinfall | 6:30 |
| 6 | Bushwacker Butch | Sgt. Slaughter | Pinfall | 6:53 |
| 7 | Sgt. Slaughter | N/A | Disqualification | 10:52 |
| Sole Survivor: | Tito Santana | | | |

^6

| Eliminated | Wrestler | Eliminated by | Method | Time |
|---|---|---|---|---|
| 1 | The Warlord | Tito Santana | Pinfall | 0:28 |
| 2 | Tito Santana | Ted DiBiase | Pinfall | 1:51 |
| 3 | Paul Roma | Hulk Hogan | Pinfall | 5:57 |
| 4 | Rick Martel | N/A | Countout | 7:17 |
| 5 | Ted DiBiase | Hulk Hogan | Pinfall | 8:30 |
| 6 | Hercules | Ultimate Warrior | Pinfall | 9:07 |
| Survivors: | Hulk Hogan and Ultimate Warrior | | | |

== Sources ==
- "2007 Wrestling Almanac & Book of Facts". Wrestling's historical cards. Kappa Publishing. 2007. pp. 88–89.
- Survivor Series '90 Review
- 1990 Survivor Series Results
