= WrestleMania VI =

1990 World Wrestling Federation pay-per-view event

- Promotional poster featuring Ultimate Warrior and Hulk Hogan.
- Promotion: World Wrestling Federation
- Date: April 1, 1990
- City: Toronto, Ontario, Canada
- Venue: SkyDome
- Attendance: 67,678
- Tagline: The Ultimate Challenge!

Pay-per-view chronology
← Previous; Royal Rumble	Next → SummerSlam

WrestleMania chronology
← Previous; V	Next → VII

WWE in Canada chronology
← Previous; Royal Rumble	Next → In Your House 4

WrestleMania VI was a 1990 professional wrestling pay-per-view (PPV) event produced by the American promotion World Wrestling Federation (WWF, renamed WWE in 2002). It was the sixth annual WrestleMania and took place on April 1, 1990, at the SkyDome in Toronto, Ontario, Canada, marking the first WrestleMania to be held outside of the United States. The event had an announced attendance of 67,678, a record for the SkyDome at the time. The main event of WrestleMania VI was "the Ultimate Challenge", pitting WWF Champion Hulk Hogan against WWF Intercontinental Heavyweight Champion Ultimate Warrior in a Winner Takes All match.

WrestleMania VI garnered mixed-to-positive reviews, with praise directed towards to the main event.

== Production ==
=== Background ===
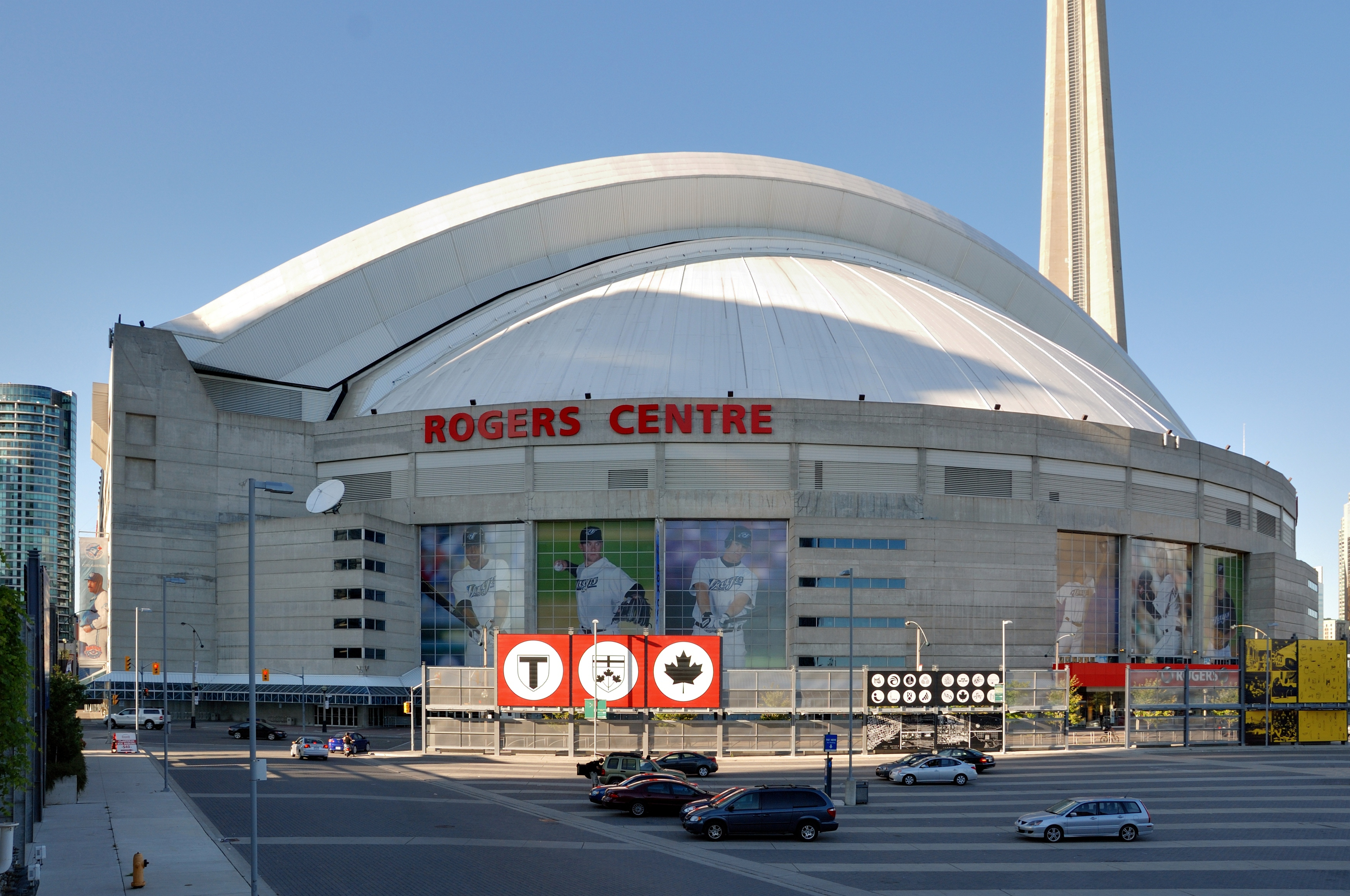
The sixth annual WrestleMania was held in Toronto, Ontario, Canada at the SkyDome (pictured as Rogers Centre, renamed in 2005), which was the first WrestleMania held outside of the United States.

WrestleMania is considered the American promotion World Wrestling Federation's (WWF, renamed WWE in 2002) flagship professional wrestling pay-per-view (PPV) event, with the first WrestleMania being held in 1985. It is held annually between mid-March to mid-April. It was the first of the WWF's original four annual PPVs, which includes Royal Rumble, SummerSlam, and Survivor Series, referred to as the "Big Four". WrestleMania VI was chosen to be held on April 1, 1990, at the SkyDome in Toronto, Ontario, Canada, marking the first WrestleMania to be held outside of the United States.

=== Storylines ===
==== Main event ====
On February 3, 1990, a week after Hogan, and Warrior crossed paths in the 1990 Royal Rumble match, Hogan put forth "the Ultimate Challenge" to Ultimate Warrior, and had to know whether "Hulkamania" or the "power of Warrior" was the "strongest force" in the WWF. On February 10, the match was officially announced as the main event of WrestleMania VI by WWF President Jack Tunney. On February 24, Tunney announced that both Hogan's WWF Championship and Ultimate Warrior's WWF Intercontinental Championship would be on the line during the match.

=== Undercard ===
Demolition had recently regained the WWF Tag Team Championship from the Brain Busters, who departed the WWF shortly afterward. To fill the void, and give manager Bobby Heenan another tag team, Haku, and André the Giant, who had teamed occasionally earlier in 1989, were formally joined to form the Colossal Connection. Haku and André were immediately pushed as number one contenders for the championship, and on December 13, 1989, the pair defeated Demolition – Smash was never legally tagged into the match – to win the belts. André and Haku held off Demolition in a series of rematches (most often with either one or both teams being disqualified) while also defending against the Rockers and the Hart Foundation.

== Event ==
Other on-screen personnel
Role:	Name:
Commentator	Gorilla Monsoon
Commentator	Jesse Ventura
Ring announcer	Howard Finkel
Interviewers	Gene Okerlund
Interviewers	Sean Mooney
Referees	Joey Marella
Referees	Earl Hebner
Referees	Danny Davis
Referees	Shane Stevens
Referees	Jim Korderas
Referees	John Bonello

Future wrestlers Edge, Christian, and Lance Storm were in attendance at WrestleMania VI, as was future wrestling personality Renee Paquette. Actor Stephen Amell, who would go on to compete in a match at SummerSlam in 2015, was also in attendance. Mary Tyler Moore was sitting at ringside.

The first bout was a singles match in which Paul Roma defeated the Brooklyn Brawler. This was a dark match that did not air on the pay-per-view broadcast.

The pay-per-view broadcast opened with Robert Goulet singing O Canada.

The second bout, and the first match to air on the pay-per-view broadcast, was a singles bout between Koko B. Ware, and Rick Martel. Martel won the match by submission using a "Quebec Crab".

The third bout was a tag team match in which WWF Tag Team Champions the Colossal Connection defended their titles against Demolition. Demolition won the bout to become the new WWF Tag Team Champions after Ax pinned Haku, following a "Demolition Decapitation". Immediately after the match, the Colossal Connection's manager Bobby Heenan began yelling at André the Giant in the ring, blaming him for the loss, and slapping him in the face. In response, André grabbed Heenan and knocked Heenan out of the ring; when Haku attempted to sneak attack André, André caught his leg and knocked Haku from the ring, making André a face for the first time in three years.

The fourth bout was a singles match pitting Earthquake against Hercules. Earthquake won the bout by pinfall following an "Earthquake Splash".

Following the fourth bout, columnist Rona Barrett interviewed Miss Elizabeth.

The fifth bout was a singles match pitting Brutus "The Barber" Beefcake against Mr. Perfect. Beefcake won the bout by pinfall after throwing Perfect into the ring post and knocking him out, marking what was credited as Perfect's first loss in the WWF. Following the match, Beefcake also knocked out Mr. Perfect's manager The Genius using a sleeper hold, then used shears to cut his hair.

The sixth bout was a singles match pitting Bad News Brown against "Rowdy" Roddy Piper. The match ended in a double count-out after both men brawled out of the ring.

Following the sixth bout, a backstage segment aired in which Steve Allen sang the State Anthem of the Soviet Union with the Bolsheviks.

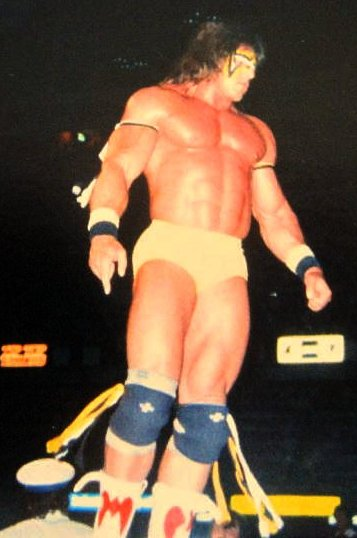
Ultimate Warrior won the WWF Championship in the main event of WrestleMania VI.

The seventh bout was a tag team match pitting the Bolsheviks against the Hart Foundation. The Hart Foundation won a short squash match when Bret Hart pinned Boris Zhukov following a "Hart Attack".

The eighth bout was a singles match pitting the Barbarian against Tito Santana. The Barbarian won the bout by pinfall following a flying clothesline.

The ninth bout was a mixed tag team match pitting Dusty Rhodes and Sapphire against "Macho King" Randy Savage and Queen Sherri. Rhodes and Sapphire won the bout when Sapphire pinned Queen Sherri using a roll-up.

The tenth bout was a tag team match pitting the Orient Express against the Rockers. The Orient Express won the bout after their manager Mr. Fuji tripped Marty Jannetty and then Sato threw salt in his eyes, causing him to be counted out.

Following the tenth bout, the tag team of Rhythm and Blues were introduced by Steve Allen.

The eleventh bout was a singles match pitting Dino Bravo against "Hacksaw" Jim Duggan. Duggan won the bout by pinfall after hitting Bravo with a 2×4.

The twelfth bout was a singles match in which "The Million Dollar Man" Ted DiBiase defended the Million Dollar Championship against Jake "The Snake" Roberts. DiBiase won the match by count-out after his bodyguard Virgil pulled Roberts outside of the ring. Roberts attacked Virgil, and DiBiase came out and applied the "Million Dollar Dream" on Roberts, and Roberts rammed him into the ring post. While Roberts was down, Virgil threw DiBiase back into the ring before the referee counted to ten.

The thirteenth bout was a singles match pitting Akeem against Big Boss Man. Big Boss Man won the bout by pinfall following a "Boss Man Slam".

Following the thirteenth bout, Rhythm & Blues and their manager Jimmy Hart were driven to the ring in a pink Cadillac by The Honky Tonk Man, where they performed the song "Hunka Hunka Hunka Honky Love". After performing the song, they were attacked by the Bushwackers who chased them from the ring and destroyed their instruments.

The fourteenth bout was a singles match pitting Jimmy Snuka against "Ravishing" Rick Rude. Rude won the bout by pinfall following a "Rude Awakening".

The main event bout was a Winner Takes All match between WWF Champion Hulk Hogan and WWF Intercontinental Champion Ultimate Warrior. Ultimate Warrior won the bout by pinfall following a big splash, thus becoming the new WWF Champion and the first person to hold the WWF Championship and WWF Intercontinental Championship simultaneously, and giving Hogan his first clean pinfall loss since 1981.

== Reception ==
The event received mixed-to-positive reviews, though most reviewers praised the main event between Hulk Hogan and Ultimate Warrior. Jason Powell was among the reviewers who praised the main event, calling it "A truly amazing match considering the limitations of both men, particularly Warrior". However, he went on to say, "The overall WrestleMania 6 card was softer than WrestleMania 5 card, but it was a better show that [sic] WrestleManias 1, 2, and 4". The Hulk Hogan-Ultimate Warrior match was named 1990's "Match of the Year" by Pro Wrestling Illustrated magazine readers.

The match between Roddy Piper and Bad News Brown received heavy criticism for featuring Piper (at that point a babyface) being painted in half-black against the African American Brown. In 2021, the match and promo were removed from the version of WrestleMania VI streamed on Peacock in the United States.

== Aftermath ==
Because the Intercontinental Heavyweight Champion Ultimate Warrior defeated Hulk Hogan to win the WWF Championship, Ultimate Warrior was forced to vacate the Intercontinental Heavyweight Championship, as the rules prohibited any wrestler from holding more than one singles belt simultaneously. An eight-man tournament was held, conducted on the WWF's syndicated WWF Superstars of Wrestling, and WWF Wrestling Challenge, with Mr. Perfect winning the title by defeating Tito Santana in the finals.

When Brutus "The Barber" Beefcake defeated Mr. Perfect at Wrestlemania VI, it was billed as Perfect's first pinfall loss in the WWF. However, in reality, Perfect had been pinned by Ultimate Warrior in a match at Madison Square Garden that aired on the MSG Network less than two weeks before WrestleMania. Beefcake would continue his feud with Perfect (with an Intercontinental title match pending at SummerSlam 1990) until a parasailing accident in July 1990 put Beefcake out of wrestling for nearly a year.

As the new WWF Champion, Ultimate Warrior would initially be a successful main event draw, with his main rival being "Ravishing" Rick Rude – a wrestler he had fought during much of 1989 over the Intercontinental Heavyweight Championship – during the spring and summer of 1990.

Hulk Hogan wrestled several matches in Japan shortly after WrestleMania VI, but soon began feuding with the 470-pound Earthquake, with that feud heating up when Earthquake sneak-attacked Hogan on The Brother Love Show in May. Announcers explained that Hogan's injuries from the attack and the loss to Warrior both took such a huge toll on his fighting spirit that he wanted to retire, and viewers were persuaded to write Hogan to encourage him to return. In reality, the attack was to write Hogan off television so that he could film the movie Suburban Commando, and to spend time with his newborn son Nicholas. Hogan would return by SummerSlam in August 1990 and got revenge on Earthquake, dominating him in matches that continued into early 1991.

WrestleMania VI would prove to be André the Giant's last televised match in the USA in the WWF as real-life health problems with acromegaly were continuing to take their toll. André returned to the WWF late in 1990 for several non-wrestling appearances that continued into 1991, but André's health continued to decline, and he died on January 27, 1993.

Demolition began a slow heel turn during the spring of 1990, adding a third member Crush to the team. This was due to Bill Eadie (who competed as Ax) desiring to take a lesser active role in wrestling, and Crush and Smash would soon become the primary defenders of the belts.

WrestleMania VI marked Jesse Ventura's last stint as a color commentator at a WWF pay-per-view event. He continued his role as an on-air color commentator for WWF Superstars of Wrestling through August 1990, at which time he left the company.

At the 1998 edition of their annual Halloween Havoc pay-per-view event, rival promotion World Championship Wrestling (WCW) pitted Hogan against Warrior once again. Hogan won with outside assistance, giving each man one victory apiece. The contest has gained a reputation as one of the worst bouts in history, being vilified by critics, then-WCW president Eric Bischoff, and former company announcer Gene Okerlund. Bischoff has disputed the rumor that he hired Warrior merely to allow Hogan to avenge his WrestleMania VI loss.

== Home media and streaming ==
The event was released on VHS by Coliseum Video in the United States and by Silver Vision in the United Kingdom.

In April 2005, it was re-released on DVD in the United Kingdom as part of Silver Vision's Tagged Classics range, and was paired with WrestleMania V. This DVD set was not released in the USA.

In 2014, the event was included on the WWE's streaming platform the WWE Network as part of its launch and remained on the service until the platform closed. In April 2025, WWE uploaded the event to stream freely on their WWE Vault YouTube channel.

== Results ==
No.	Results	Stipulations	Times
1^{D}	Paul Roma defeated Brooklyn Brawler by pinfall	Singles match	—
2	Rick Martel defeated Koko B. Ware by submission	Singles match	5:31
3	Demolition (Ax and Smash) defeated the Colossal Connection (André the Giant and Haku) (c) (with Bobby Heenan) by pinfall	Tag team match for the WWF Tag Team Championship	9:30
4	Earthquake (with Jimmy Hart) defeated Hercules by pinfall	Singles match	4:52
5	Brutus Beefcake defeated Mr. Perfect (with The Genius) by pinfall	Singles match	7:48
6	Roddy Piper vs. Bad News Brown ended in a double countout	Singles match	6:48
7	The Hart Foundation (Bret Hart and Jim Neidhart) defeated the Bolsheviks (Nikolai Volkoff and Boris Zhukov) by pinfall	Tag team match	0:19
8	The Barbarian (with Bobby Heenan) defeated Tito Santana by pinfall	Singles match	4:33
9	Dusty Rhodes and Sapphire (with Miss Elizabeth) defeated "Macho King" Randy Savage and Queen Sherri by pinfall	Mixed tag team match	7:52
10	The Orient Express (Sato and Tanaka) (with Mr. Fuji) defeated the Rockers (Marty Jannetty and Shawn Michaels) by countout	Tag team match	7:38
11	Jim Duggan defeated Dino Bravo (with Jimmy Hart and Earthquake) by pinfall	Singles match	4:15
12	Ted DiBiase (c) (with Virgil) defeated Jake "the Snake" Roberts by countout	Singles match for the Million Dollar Championship	11:50
13	Big Boss Man defeated Akeem (with Slick) by pinfall	Singles match	1:49
14	Rick Rude (with Bobby Heenan) defeated Jimmy Snuka by pinfall	Singles match	3:59
15	Ultimate Warrior (Intercontinental) defeated Hulk Hogan (WWF) by pinfall	Winner Takes All match for the WWF Intercontinental Championship and WWF Championship	22:51
(c) / – the champion(s) heading into the match; D / – this was a dark match

== See also ==
- Professional wrestling in Canada
- 1980s professional wrestling boom
