= WWE Vault =

YouTube channel network operated by WWE

YouTube information
- Channel: WWEVault
- Years active: 2024–present
- Subscribers: 4.46 million
- Views: 3.79 billion
- Last updated: November 11, 2026
- Website: www.youtube.com/@WWEVault

WCW

YouTube information
- Channel: WCW
- Years active: 2024–present
- Subscribers: 567 thousand
- Views: 319 million
- Last updated: November 11, 2026
- Website: www.youtube.com/@WCW

WWE NXT

YouTube information
- Channel: WWENXT
- Years active: 2024–present
- Subscribers: 570 thousand
- Views: 252 million
- Last updated: November 11, 2026
- Website: www.youtube.com/@WWENXT

Undertaker

YouTube information
- Channel: Undertaker
- Years active: 2025–present
- Subscribers: 560 thousand
- Views: 423 million
- Last updated: November 11, 2026
- Website: www.youtube.com/@Undertaker

The WWE Vault is a network of YouTube channels operated by World Wrestling Entertainment, LLC (WWE), the professional wrestling subsidiary of TKO Group Holdings (TKO). The channels feature content from the WWE Legacy Department and often upload highlight videos, music videos, documentaries, episodes of various television shows, and previously unseen clips. The channels also serve as an archive of major events held by WWE and its various brands and subsidiaries.

== Background ==
Beginning in 2021, WWE began to phase out the WWE Network, the promotion's in-house streaming service, as the company reached multiple agreements with streaming services as domestic rightsholders (such as Peacock in the United States, Binge in Australia, and Abema in Japan) to carry its content instead. In 2024, WWE then announced an agreement with Netflix, under which it will hold the streaming rights to its content internationally beginning in January 2025; the agreement was part of one that granted Netflix the rights to WWE Raw in the United States and internationally. The WWE Network ceased standalone operations in the vast majority of its remaining countries on January 1, 2025. From 2024, WWE started uploading library content including full shows and other archive content to YouTube via the WWE Vault channel, and in 2025 started uploading World Championship Wrestling library content and NXT library content to their own dedicated YouTube channels.

On September 1, 2026, WWE had filed a trademark application in the United States Patent and Trademark Office for the name "WWE Vault" under the Class 41 classification.

== Channels ==
=== WWE Vault ===
The WWE Vault YouTube channel launched in 2024 as a replacement for the WWE Network in the United States.

In September 2025, WWE Vault began uploading episodes of Hulk Hogan's Rock 'n' Wrestling, a cartoon series which consisted of animated adventures featuring various wrestlers from the then WWF during the 1980s including Hulk Hogan (voiced by Brad Garrett), Roddy Piper (voiced by Charlie Adler), André the Giant (voiced by Ron Feinberg) and more. The episodes were previously removed from the WWE Network in 2015 after controversial racial statements previously made by Hogan were made public.

By May 2026, the WWE Vault channel accumulated over four million subscribers.

=== WCW ===
On March 6, 2025, WWE launched the WCW YouTube channel which serves as an archive for the events and programming of World Championship Wrestling (WCW), Jim Crockett Promotions (JCP), and various other National Wrestling Alliance (NWA) territories whose libraries were purchased by WWE. The channel also features a 24/7 livestream of various archived programming including television broadcasts and pay-per-views.

=== NXT ===
In January 2025, WWE launched the WWE NXT YouTube channel with the first video uploaded being the June 20, 2012 episode of the weekly NXT program. The channel also uploads highlights, unseen footage, full NXT episodes, and NXT-branded premium live events. By March 2026, the channel had almost completed the transition of the NXT library from Peacock.

=== Undertaker ===
On November 19, 2025, WWE, and its Head of Digital Media, Steve Braband, launched a dedicated channel for The Undertaker. The videos that are uploaded are his matches, documentaries, and the Six Feet Under podcast. The first video uploaded was his debut match from the 1990 Survivor Series event.
