= Heenan Family =

Professional wrestling stable

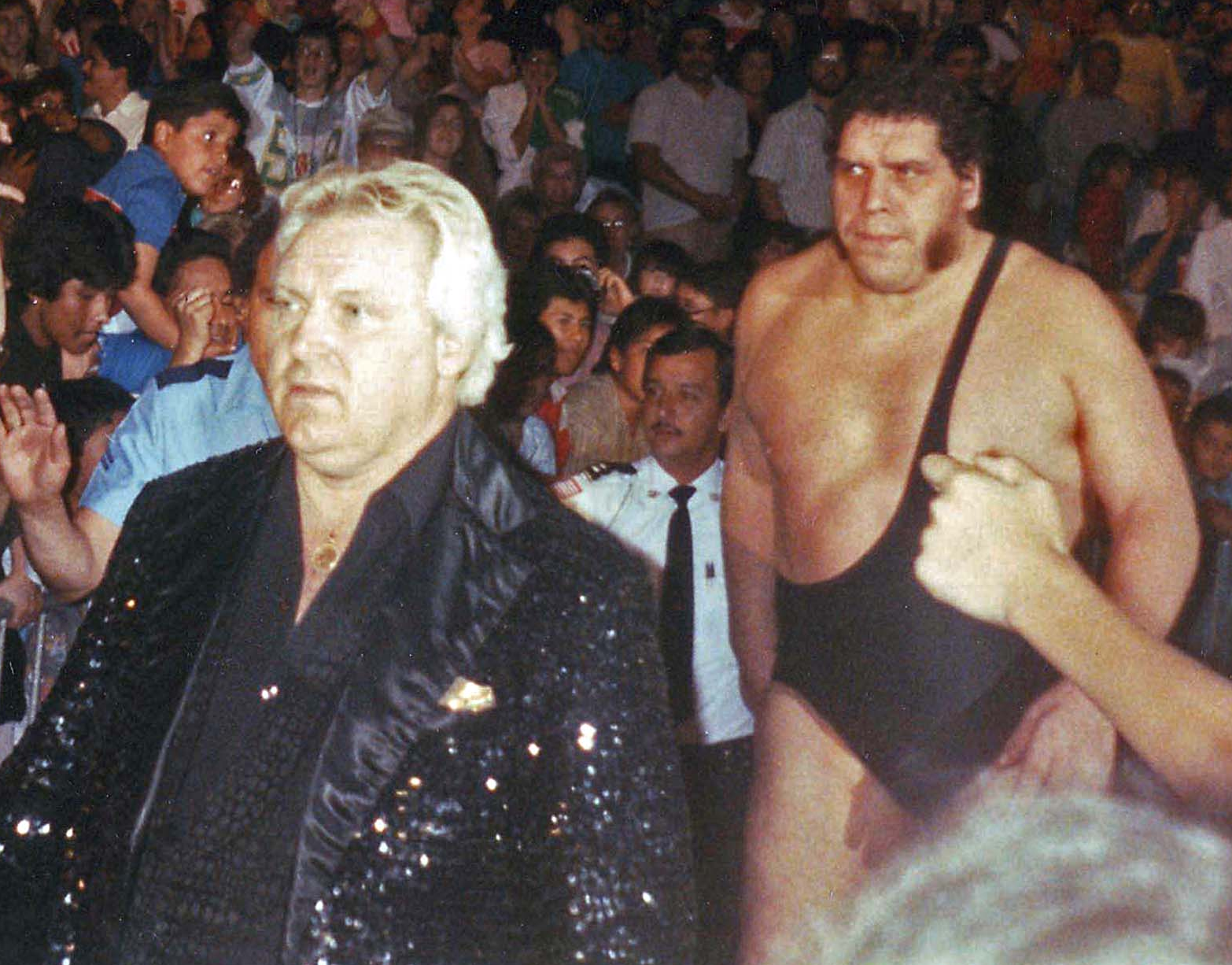
- Bobby Heenan (left) accompanying Heenan Family member André the Giant to the ring in the late-1980s.

Stable
- Members: See below
- Debut: 1974
- Disbanded: 1993
- Years active: 1974–1993

The Heenan Family was a stable of wrestlers managed by Bobby "The Brain" Heenan beginning in the 1970s. Heenan managed wrestlers under the Heenan Family name in the American Wrestling Association (AWA), the National Wrestling Alliance's (NWA) Georgia Championship Wrestling (GCW), and the World Wrestling Federation (WWF).

The term "stable" refers to a group of wrestlers in an ongoing alliance, often under a single manager. Heenan notoriously disliked the term, stating that "a stable is a place where you keep a bunch of fly-infested horses", and instead referred to his collective wrestlers as his "family". The name moved with him, and changed members frequently.

== History ==
=== American Wrestling Association (1974–1979) ===
Bobby "The Brain" Heenan, a professional wrestling manager, joined the American Wrestling Association (AWA) full time in 1974 managing the team of Nick Bockwinkel and Ray Stevens. Bobby Duncum, Sr. joined within the next year forming the first version of the Heenan family. He went on to later manage The Blackjacks (Lanza and Mulligan). Heenan led his members to many title reigns, including the AWA World Heavyweight Championship and the AWA World Tag Team Championship before leaving AWA in 1979 to join Georgia Championship Wrestling (GCW).

=== Georgia Championship Wrestling (1979) ===
In GCW, Heenan formed his second version of Heenan Family, where Blackjack Lanza remained in the stable, while Heenan received new members in Masked Superstar, Killer Karl Kox, Professor Toru Tanaka, and Ernie Ladd. He also led this version to numerous title reigns before he left GCW.

=== Return to AWA (1979–1984) ===
After leaving GCW, Heenan returned to AWA, where he reformed Heenan Family with Nick Bockwinkel. He added Super Destroyer Mark II shortly after arriving. Ken Patera joined in 1982. Toward the end of his time in the AWA, Mr. Saito became part of the Heenan Family.

=== World Wrestling Federation (1984–1993) ===
==== 1984–1985 ====
Heenan made his debut appearance in the World Wrestling Federation (WWF) in September 1984, seconding Big John Studd to the ring. While Jesse Ventura was originally supposed to be the first member of the WWF version of the Heenan Family, he was forced to retire due to health problems. Studd officially became the first member of the WWF version of the Heenan Family, and it wasn't long before Patera joined the fold. Heenan managed Buddy Rose From December 1984 to January 1985 and appeared with him on Piper's Pit.

Adrian Adonis and Missing Link joined the Heenan Family in May 1985.

The Heenan Family's first target was André the Giant, with whom Studd had been embroiled in a bitter feud over who was the true "giant" of wrestling. The Heenan Family scored the first major victory in the feud when Heenan helped instigate a 2-on-1 attack on André, an incident that resulted in Studd and Patera cutting André's famous locks of hair. André regained the upper hand. In response, Heenan then traded Adrian Adonis and Missing Link to manager Jimmy Hart in September 1985 for King Kong Bundy. Bundy, along with Studd, continued to make life difficult for André, who turned to Hulk Hogan and Tony Atlas for assistance.

==== 1986 ====
Studd and Bundy also formed a successful tag team, though they never seriously challenged for the WWF Tag Team Championship, instead concentrating on Heenan Family feuds with André and Hogan. At WrestleMania 2, Heenan would manage King Kong Bundy at the main event. In May 1986, Heenan managed longtime friend Harley Race, bleaching his hair blond and billing himself as "Handsome" Harley Race. During a time when the WWF did not recognize the existence of other promotions and the accomplishments a wrestler made there, WWF officials came up with a solution to recognize his wrestling pedigree by having him win the King of the Ring tournament. After this, he referred to himself as "King" Harley Race, coming to the ring in a royal crown and cape, to the ceremonial accompaniment of the tenth movement (known as "The Great Gates of Kiev") of Pictures at an Exhibition by Modest Mussorgsky. After winning a match, Harley would make his defeated opponent "bow and kneel" before him and Heenan would usually assist the defeated opponent to "bow and kneel" by grabbing their hair and forcing them to bow before King Harley Race.

As part of a storyline explaining André's leave of absence from the WWF (due to health problems and a tour of Japan), the Heenan Family campaigned to have André suspended for failing to show for matches against Studd and Bundy, and later to require a lifetime suspension from the WWF if they could prove a masked man competing as the "Giant Machine" was André. In addition to André, WWF World Heavyweight Champion Hulk Hogan was another frequent target of the Heenan Family (though in real life the pair were friends and, when he was leaving the AWA, Heenan had actually called Hogan about getting work in the WWF and then suggested him to WWF owner Vince McMahon). Early on, Heenan turned to Studd, Bundy and Hogan's on-again, off-again friend "Mr. Wonderful" Paul Orndorff to win the title from Hogan, but they were all unsuccessful. In October 1986, Heenan purchased the contract of Hercules from his previous manager Slick. On the November 26, 1986 Saturday Night's Main Event VIII, Heenan would lead Hercules in a title match against Hogan. Although he was able to put Hogan in the "Hercules Backbreaker" torture rack, he lost by pinfall. On December 14 at the following Saturday Night's Main Event IX taping in Hartford, CT, he would manage Paul Orndorff in steel cage rematch against Hogan, who again won the match.

==== 1987 ====
Although John Studd had departed at the end of 1986, Heenan scored a major coup for his stable in January 1987, when André turned heel and challenged Hogan for the title at WrestleMania III. In what was billed as "the biggest title match in wrestling history", Hogan was successful in his match against André in front of a reported 93,173 fans at the Silverdome in Pontiac, Michigan. Following the defeat at WrestleMania, André would go into seclusion; Heenan would meanwhile set about expanding the Heenan Family and leading Harley Race in matches against Hogan. In May 1987, The Islanders (Haku and Tama) were scheduled for a match on Superstars of Wrestling. Their opponents were the popular Can-Am Connection (Rick Martel and Tom Zenk), in what was billed as a scientific match. Heenan appeared at ringside during the bout, seemingly surprising both teams, the referee, and the commentators. The confusion allowed The Islanders to attack the Can-Ams from behind, giving The Islanders a countout win. Tama's gave a flying headbutt to Zenk on the arena floor as Heenan gloated over his new tag team. A summer feud between the two tag teams was brewing, but was scrapped when Zenk departed the WWF. The feud was transferred over to the newly formed tag team Strike Force after Tito Santana replaced Tom Zenk in the now defunct Can-Am Connection. The feud picked up steam in October of that year after Strike Force upset the Hart Foundation for the WWF Tag Team Championship giving Bobby and his family a championship program. On July 15, "Ravishing" Rick Rude was added to the Heenan Family at a Superstars taping in Glens Falls, New York. At this point, the group was at its largest, with André, Bundy, Orndorff, Rude, Race, Hercules, Haku and Tama all managed by Heenan.

In August 1987, the Family took a hit when Orndorff dumped Heenan and joined Oliver Humperdink. A month later, he joined other managers in an effort to sign Bam Bam Bigelow, in an angle that was called "The Battle for Bam Bam". Bigelow in the end wound up a babyface when he denounced all the heel managers and announced that his manager was going to be Oliver Humperdink. In November, André would officially return and won the inaugural Survivor Series elimination tag team match. On December 7, Heenan would again lead Bundy in an effort to dethrone Hulk Hogan at a Saturday Night's Main Event XIV taping in Landover, Maryland. Bundy was once again defeated and would leave the WWF the following month, but André would attack Hogan and set up a rematch for 1988.

==== 1988 ====
One year after signing André the Giant, Heenan sold Andre's contract to Ted DiBiase. This would essentially end his two-year primary quest to end Hulk Hogan's reign, and he would instead turn his efforts to The Islanders. They became embroiled in a feud with The British Bulldogs (Davey Boy Smith and the Dynamite Kid), whose mascot Matilda was "dog-napped" by The Islanders on an episode of Superstars; in the weeks following the "dog-napping" incident, The Islanders and Heenan brought a leash to the ring and — to taunt their foes — would pantomime feeding and caressing a dog. The two teams met on opposite sides of a six-man tag team match (along with Koko B. Ware teaming with The British Bulldogs and Heenan with The Islanders) at WrestleMania IV. "High Chief" Afi joined the tag team to make a trio for one episode of Superstars, taped April 21, 1988 and aired on May 7, 1988. However, the trio would not last long, as Tama's last match with the WWF took place on April 24, 1988 in Toronto's Maple Leaf Gardens, and Haku and Afi would wrestle only a small number of matches through May as The Islanders before Afi departed.

On March 7, 1988 in Nashville, Tennessee, Heenan would lead King Harley Race against former champion Hulk Hogan on Saturday Night's Main Event XV. During the match, Race would suffer an abdominal injury that would sideline him for most of the year. On June 21 at a Superstars taping, Heenan replaced him with Haku as the new "King". The Family was further reduced on September 13 when he sold the contract of Hercules to Ted DiBiase on Superstars, resulting in Hercules turning face when he refused to become DiBiase's "slave". The two slots in the Family were then filled on October 5 in Fort Wayne, Indiana when Arn Anderson and Tully Blanchard joined as The Brain Busters.

In the fall, newcomer "Scary" Terry Taylor acquired Heenan as his manager and was rebranded "The Red Rooster", a gimmick which saw him don red tights and ring coat and, later as a babyface, style his hair like a rooster's comb and strut like a rooster. Early in his Red Rooster stint, the heel Taylor was portrayed as a novice wrestler who could not navigate his way through matches without constant instructions from Heenan. The Rooster made his pay-per-view debut in the main event of Survivor Series, where he was the first wrestler eliminated from the match.

On December 6, Heenan tried to further expand the Family by bringing Big John Studd back to the group. However, in a segment on The Brother Love show Studd announced that he wanted nothing to do with the organization. At the end of the year, Harley Race did come back, setting up a friendly match with King Haku for the crown at the upcoming Royal Rumble.

==== 1989 ====
King Haku was successful in retaining his crown against Race in the latter's comeback attempt. Heenan appeared at ringside cheering on both men, but afterwards Race departed. Also that month on the January 7, 1989 episode of Saturday Night's Main Event XIX, The Red Rooster lost a match to Tito Santana due to being distracted by an argument with Heenan. Following the loss, Heenan slapped Taylor, who was tired of Heenan's demeaning style of coaching, and turned against his manager and attacked him. He became a babyface as a result, though he retained the Red Rooster gimmick. Heenan feigned wanting to make amends with Taylor on Prime Time Wrestling, but it was a set-up for Taylor to be ambushed by Heenan's new protege, long-time enhancement talent Steve Lombardi, who Heenan reinvented as The Brooklyn Brawler. The two feuded, leading to The Red Rooster defeating The Brooklyn Brawler on the March 11, 1989 episode of Saturday Night's Main Event XX and then defeating Heenan in a 30-second squash at WrestleMania V.

After going more than a year without winning any of the WWF championship (World Heavyweight, Intercontinental or Tag Team), the Heenan Family got its first title when Rick Rude (with help from Heenan) upset Ultimate Warrior to win the Intercontinental Championship at WrestleMania V. Shortly thereafter, he led The Brain Busters (former Horsemen members Arn Anderson and Tully Blanchard) to the WWF Tag Team Championship with a win over Demolition (Ax and Smash) on Saturday Night's Main Event XXIV, giving the Heenan Family two champions at one time. The Brain Busters would later lose the titles to Demolition in a rematch, and in November 1989 departed the company. A month later, Heenan formed a new team, The Colossal Connection (André and Haku), who defeated Demolition.

==== 1990 ====
On February 13, Heenan would add to the Family by acquiring the contract of The Barbarian from Mr. Fuji. At WrestleMania VI in Toronto, Ontario, Canada, Demolition regained the titles from The Colossal Connection and after the match, Heenan angrily berated Andre, leading André to turn on him and depart. Later that month, his spot in the Family would be filled by Mr Perfect, and the Heenan Family got its fourth title when Mr. Perfect defeated former champion Tito Santana and won a tournament at a Superstars taping on April 23 in Austin, Texas to fill the vacant Intercontinental Championship. Going into the match, Perfect had told that he would have a "new" manager, with the surprise that it was Bobby Heenan, who came to ringside midway through the bout and distracted Santana enough to allow Perfect to get the win. The same month, Heenan would manage a charge against the world title for the first time in over two years, when he led Haku in a match against new world champion Ultimate Warrior. Although Haku was unsuccessful, Heenan managed Rick Rude in a series of challenges against Warrior throughout the summer, but Rude was unsuccessful.

At SummerSlam, Mr. Perfect lost the Intercontinental Championship to Kerry Von Erich. Rick Rude departed the WWF in September, leaving the Heenan Family with just Hennig, Haku, and Barbarian as members. Perfect regained the title on November 19, 1990, thanks to interference from Ted DiBiase. This title win aired on the December 15, 1990 episode of Superstars.

==== 1991–1993 ====
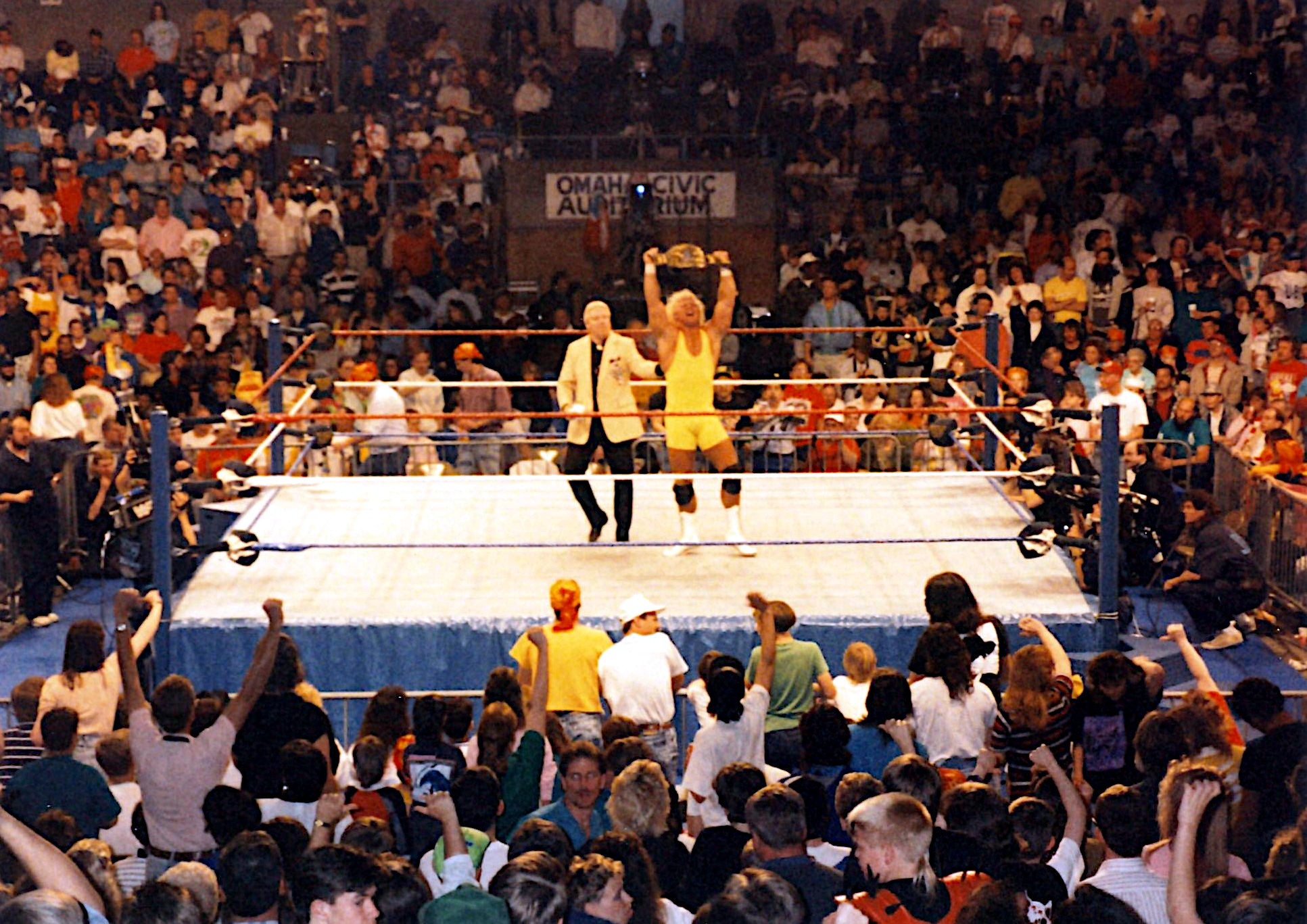
Mr. Perfect & Bobby Heenan in 1991

Mr. Perfect faced Big Boss Man at WrestleMania VII in Los Angeles, where a disqualification loss after Bossman was attacked by Heenan Family members Haku and The Barbarian meant that he retained his title; during the match, Perfect had been hit in the head with the Intercontinental Championship title belt by former Heenan member André the Giant, though he managed to kick-out of a pin attempt. Despite this, the following month Heenan became one of several managers to attempt to sign Andre the Giant to their respective stables. Andre refused and forced Heenan to march in a tub of grapes on Prime Time Wrestling.

A month later, the Heenan Family came to a temporary conclusion as Heenan announced on May 28 at a Superstars taping that he was selling the contract of Intercontinental Champion Mr. Perfect to "Coach" John Tolos and retiring to become a "broadcast journalist"; in reality, he retired as a manager due to lingering effects of a broken neck suffered in 1983 and being an announcer offered a less strenuous travel schedule as well as no longer taking bumps. However, he would go to associate with Ric Flair when he came to the WWF soon after, and was wildly excited when Flair became WWF Heavyweight Champion at the 1992 Royal Rumble, and was seen celebrating with Flair after the match. Heenan's commentary during the Royal Rumble match was highly biased in favor of Flair even by his own standards as a heel announcer.

Heenan also introduced Lex Luger in January 1993 and was known as his advisor, though he did not appear as his manager at ringside. On the July 26, 1993 episode of Monday Night Raw, an excited Heenan left the announce booth to welcome his "good friend" Jim Cornette to the WWF. Cornette has later praised Heenan for putting him over, claiming Heenan's endorsement gave him instant heat with the WWF audience.

==== Roster ====
Other wrestlers who were part of the Heenan Family, at one time or another, were Ken Patera, Paul Orndorff, Adrian Adonis, The Missing Link, "The King" Harley Race, The Islanders (Haku and Tama), Hercules, The Barbarian, The Red Rooster, and The Brooklyn Brawler. Several of them—most notably Hercules and Race—challenged Hogan for the WWF World Heavyweight Championship, while others played key roles in various mid-card and main-event storylines.

== Members ==
=== AWA members ===
- Blackjack Lanza
- Blackjack Mulligan
- Bobby Duncum
- Ken Patera
- Mr. Saito
- Nick Bockwinkel
- Ray Stevens
- Stan Hansen
- Super Destroyer Mark II
- Cowboy Bob Orton, Jr.

=== NWA Georgia members ===
- Austin Idol
- Blackjack Lanza
- Bobby Jaggers
- Ernie Ladd
- Karl Kox
- Masked Superstar
- Professor Toru Tanaka
- Ron Bass

=== WWA members ===
- Angelo Poffo
- Baron von Raschke
- Chris Markoff
- Jimmy Valiant
- Johnny Valiant

=== WWF members ===
Per The WWE Encyclopedia:

- Adrian Adonis
- André the Giant
- The Barbarian
- Big John Studd
- The Brain Busters (Arn Anderson and Tully Blanchard)
- Buddy Rose
- The Brooklyn Brawler
- The Colossal Connection (André the Giant and Haku)
- Harley Race
- Hercules
- The Islanders (Haku and Tama)
- Ken Patera
- King Kong Bundy
- Lex Luger
- The Missing Link
- Mr. Perfect
- Paul Orndorff
- The Red Rooster
- Ric Flair
- Rick Rude
- Sivi Afi

== WWF Membership Timeline ==
- Note: Heenan retired as a ringside manager in June 1991, but acted as an advisor/consultant for Flair and Luger.

== Championships and accomplishments ==
- American Wrestling Association
  - AWA International Heavyweight Championship (2 times) – Ken Patera
  - AWA Southern Heavyweight Championship (1 time) – Nick Bockwinkel
  - AWA World Heavyweight Championship (4 times) – Nick Bockwinkel
  - AWA World Tag Team Championship (5 times) – Nick Bockwinkel and Ray Stevens (4), Bobby Duncum, Sr. and Blackjack Lanza (1)
- Georgia Championship Wrestling
  - NWA Georgia Heavyweight Championship (5 times) – Masked Superstar (4), Killer Karl Kox (1)
  - NWA Georgia Tag Team Championship (2 times) – Professor Toru Tanaka and Mr. Fuji (1), Professor Toru Tanaka and Assassin #2 (1)
- Pro Wrestling Illustrated
  - Manager of the Year (1972, 1976, 1989, 1991) – Bobby Heenan
  - Most Hated Wrestler of the Year (1988) – Andre The Giant
  - Tag Team of the Year (1973, 1989) – Nick Bockwinkel and Ray Stevens (1973), The Brain Busters (1989)
- World Wrestling Federation
  - WWF Championship^{1} (3 times) – André the Giant (1), Ric Flair (2)
  - WWF Intercontinental Championship (3 times) – Mr. Perfect (2), Rick Rude (1)
  - WWF Tag Team Championship (2 times) – The Brain Busters (Arn Anderson and Tully Blanchard) (1), The Colossal Connection (André the Giant and Haku) (1)
  - King of the Ring (1986) – Harley Race
  - Sam Muchnick Memorial Tournament (1986) – Harley Race
  - WWF Intercontinental Heavyweight Championship Tournament (1990) – Mr. Perfect
- Wrestling Observer Newsletter
  - Most Embarrassing Wrestler (1989) – André the Giant
  - Most Overrated (1984) – John Studd
  - Worst Feud of the Year (1984) – John Studd vs. André the Giant
  - Worst Feud of the Year (1986) – John Studd and King Kong Bundy vs. The Machines
  - Worst Feud of the Year (1989) – André the Giant vs. Ultimate Warrior
  - Worst Worked Match of the Year (1987) – André the Giant vs. Hulk Hogan at WrestleMania III
  - Worst Worked Match of the Year (1989) – André the Giant vs. Ultimate Warrior on October 31
  - Worst Wrestler (1989) – André the Giant

^{1} When André the Giant won the championship, it was called the WWF World Heavyweight Championship. By July 1989, it was renamed to WWF Championship.

== See also ==
- Devastation, Inc.
- The Blackjacks
- The Dangerous Alliance
- The Faces of Fear
- The First Family
- The Stud Stable
