= Islanders (professional wrestling) =

Professional wrestling tag team

The Islanders
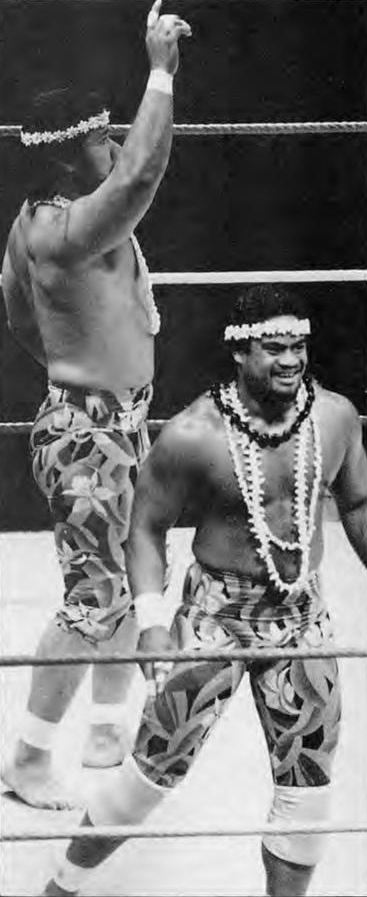
- Haku (back-left) and Tama (front-right), circa 1987.

Tag team
- Members: Haku; Tama; Siva Afi
- Name: Islanders
- Combined billed weight: 753 lb (342 kg; 53.8 st)
- Billed from: The South Pacific
- Debut: August 1986
- Disbanded: May 1988
- Years active: 1986–1988

The Islanders were a professional wrestling tag team which consisted of Tonga Fifita (Haku) and Sam Fatu (Tama), best known with their tenure in World Wrestling Federation. They were managed by Bobby Heenan and had a memorable feud with The British Bulldogs in which they kidnapped their pet mascot Matilda. They were also very briefly joined by a third islander Siva Afi.

== History ==
=== Formation ===
Prior to being known as Haku, Fifita wrestled as King Tonga, entering the WWF in late-1985. He bodyslammed Big John Studd on a televised show at a time when Studd was being billed as a man who couldn't be slammed. Sam Fatu (Tama) meanwhile, wrestled in the WWF in 1983–1984 as the Tonga Kid, eventually aiding Jimmy Snuka in his feud against Rowdy Roddy Piper. He disappeared shortly after the Piper feud and returned to the WWF in mid-1986, still wrestling as the Tonga Kid. He was almost immediately put into a tag team with King Tonga, given their new names and christened The Islanders. Initially, they wrestled as faces.

=== Face run ===
Initially, the Islanders wrestled preliminary matches. They won most of the matches and occasionally got matches against higher card teams, such as the Hart Foundation or The Dream Team. Their big break came in late 1986 when they won a tag-team battle royal at Madison Square Garden, last eliminating the favored King Kong Bundy and Big John Studd. While it appeared initially that a feud with Studd and Bundy was on the horizon, that idea was scrapped when Studd left the WWF. The Islanders soon found themselves on the lower end of the card, losing to more established tag teams such as The Dream Team, Nikolai Volkoff and The Iron Sheik, and Don Muraco and Bob Orton. During this period, the WWF was loaded with great tag teams, and the Islanders were lost in the mix during early 1987. They were the first team to wrestle the Hart Foundation on television after the Harts won the titles in January, but lost. They soon found themselves in a long losing streak against a new team, Demolition. They began wrestling other face teams during this period, usually the Rougeau Brothers, and these matches were typically a double disqualification. With little momentum, the Islanders were left off the biggest card of the year, WrestleMania III.

=== Heel run ===
Shortly after WrestleMania, the Islanders continued losing to Demolition, but were scheduled for a match on the WWF Superstars of Wrestling. Their opponents were the popular Can-Am Connection (Rick Martel and Tom Zenk), in what was billed as a scientific match. Manager Bobby Heenan appeared at ringside during the bout, seemingly surprising both teams, the referee, and the commentators. The confusion allowed the Islanders to attack the Can-Ams from behind, giving the Islanders a countout win. Tama gave a flying headbutt to Tom Zenk on the arena floor as Bobby Heenan gloated over his new tag team. A summer feud with the most popular tag team in the federation was brewing, but was scrapped when Tom Zenk departed the WWF. Zenk's departure was worked into the feud, as Heenan and the Islanders pointed out that Zenk was a quitter and abandoned Martel in his time of need.

As heels, The Islanders had two major feuds. The first was with Strike Force, who were formed in the wake of Tito Santana saving Martel — now without a tag team partner — from the Islanders' 2-on-1 attack. The feud was generally even, with both sides gaining victories, until Strike Force won the WWF World Tag Team Championship, after which the Islanders challenged Santana and Martel for the belts but were unsuccessful in winning the championship.

In between feuds, the Islanders appeared at the very first Survivor Series. They were part of the 10 team survivor Tag Team elimination match. While Haku lay on the mat during the match, Dynamite Kid of the British Bulldogs attempted a falling headbutt from the top rope; to help sell Haku as a tough wrestler and the Islanders as a championship-contending team, announcer Jesse Ventura immediately pointed out Dynamite Kid's mistake in mentioning, "Oh, no, you don't want to butt heads with these South Sea Island Boys." Dynamite Kid was practically knocked out, as Haku shook his head, arose, and landed a throat kick to Dynamite Kid, pinning him.

The Islanders' second major feud, which started shortly after the Survivor Series, was with The British Bulldogs, whose mascot Matilda was "dog-napped" by The Islanders on an episode of WWF Superstars of Wrestling; in the aftermath, WWF President Jack Tunney briefly suspended the Islanders over the incident and would not relent until Matilda was found safe and sound. In the weeks following the "dog-napping" incident, the Islanders and Heenan brought a leash to the ring and — to taunt their foes and build fan heat — would pantomime feeding and caressing a dog. Eventually, the Bulldogs and Islanders met on opposite sides of a 6-man tag team match (along with Koko B. Ware teaming with the Bulldogs and Bobby Heenan with The Islanders) at WrestleMania IV.

"High Chief" Afi joined the tag team to make a trio for one episode of WWF Superstars of Wrestling, taped April 21, 1988 and aired on May 7, 1988. However, the trio would not last long. Tama's last match with the WWF took place on April 24, 1988 in Toronto's Maple Leaf Gardens and Haku and Afi would wrestle only a small number of matches through May as the Islanders before Afi was released. Haku stayed in the WWF for several more years afterwards as both a single and tag team wrestler.

== Championships and accomplishments ==
- World Wrestling Federation
  - Slammy Award (1 time)
    - Bobby "The Brain" Heenan Scholarship Award (1987) with André the Giant, Hercules, King Kong Bundy and Harley Race

== See also ==
- Colossal Connection
- Dungeon of Doom
- Faces of Fear
- Heenan Family
- Stud Stable
- The Bloodline
