= Can-Am Connection =

Professional wrestling tag team

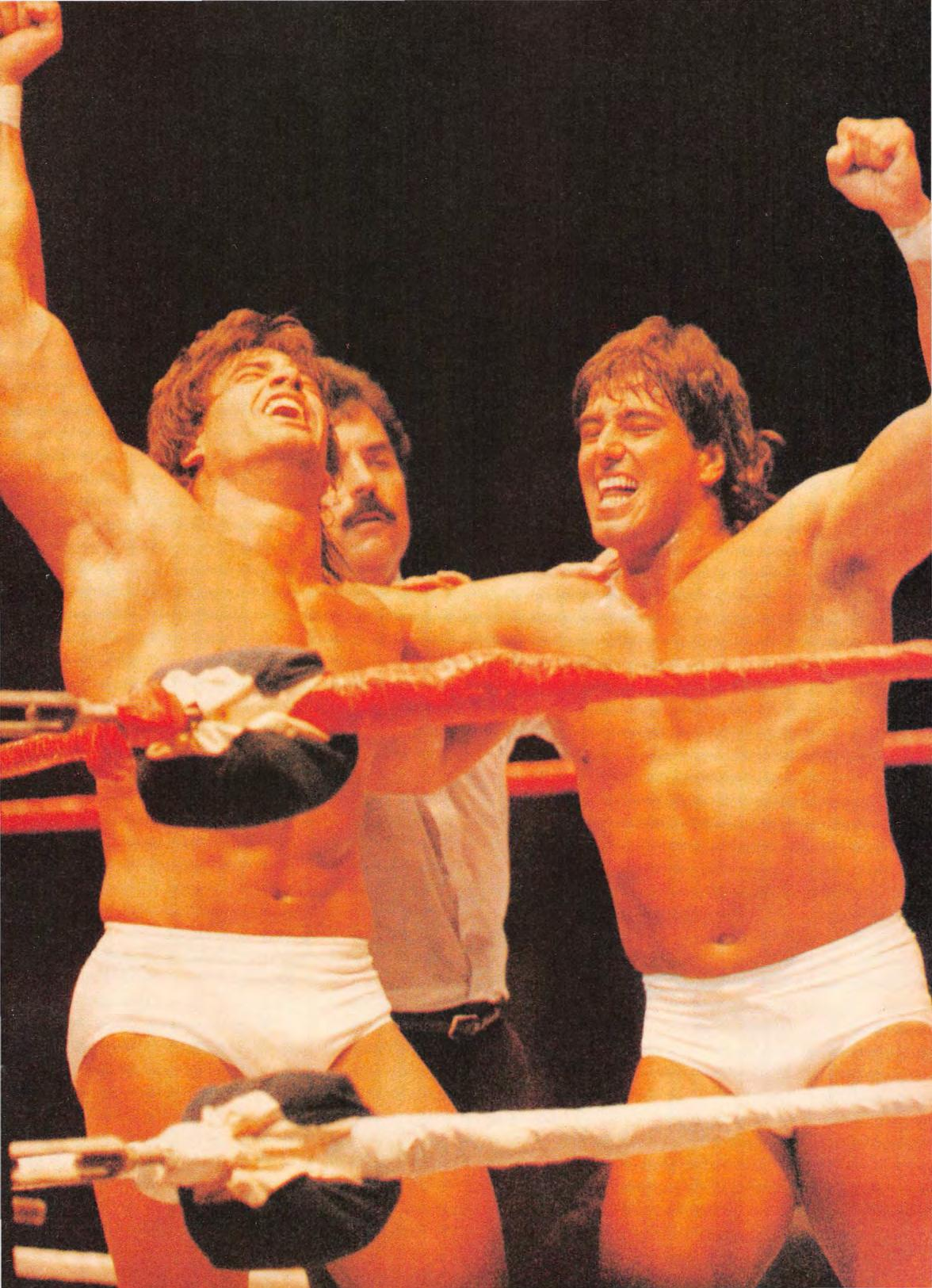
- Zenk (left) and Martel (right), circa 1987

Tag team
- Members: Rick Martel; Tom Zenk
- Billed heights: Martel: 6 ft 0 in (1.83 m); Zenk: 6 ft 1 in (1.85 m)
- Combined billed weight: 471 lb (214 kg; 33.6 st)
- Debut: 1986
- Disbanded: 1987

The Can-Am Connection was a tag team composed of Rick Martel and Tom Zenk in the World Wrestling Federation (WWF) through 1986 and 1987.

== History ==
In 1986, Canadian wrestler Rick Martel returned to the WWF with his then tag team partner, American Tom Zenk, as the Can-Am Connection. The Can-Am Connection had been formed by Martel in the Montreal International Wrestling Association in August 1986. Tom Zenk was the boyfriend of Martel's sister-in-law, and had been introduced to Martel in the AWA by Curt Hennig. They also worked for All Japan Pro Wrestling in the fall of 1986.

The team made their televised debut in WWF on the November 15, 1986, episode of Superstars against the team of Steve Lombardi and Moondog Spot which they won. The Can Am Connection contested a series of matches with former tag-team champions The Dream Team (Brutus Beefcake and Greg Valentine), the team of Kamala and Sika, and the team of Don Muraco and "Ace" Cowboy Bob Orton, whom they would face and defeat in the opening match of WrestleMania III. And they faced and ended Demolition (Ax and Smash)'s undefeated streak on June 6, 1987, at the Boston Garden. The Can-Am Connection's last feud would be against The Islanders (Haku and Tama), a feud that began on WWF Superstars of Wrestling in the summer of 1987. In this match, the Islanders turned heel by revealing their association with manager Bobby "The Brain" Heenan.

Shortly after this match, Tom Zenk left the WWF due to a pay dispute, with the tag team wrestling their last match together on July 9, 1987, against the Islanders. Until Zenk's death of atherosclerosis and cardiomegaly, he and Rick Martel had differing opinions on the matter of why Tom Zenk left the WWF, all but eliminating the chance of a Can-Am Connection reunion. The two never reconciled before Zenk's passing in 2017. WWF ceased acknowledging Zenk by name after his departure, only referring to him as "Rick Martel's former partner" when mentioning the split. WWE still does not acknowledge Zenk to this day, however, archived footage of some of his matches with both WWF, and later WCW as "The Z-Man," does appear on WWE Network.

== The Spinoff ==
When Zenk left, Martel initially carried on the feud with the Islanders on his own, but was soon paired up with Tito Santana to tackle the Polynesian duo, spinning the ill-fated Can-Am Connection off to Strike Force who went on to win the WWF World Tag Team Championship.
