= Demolition (professional wrestling) =

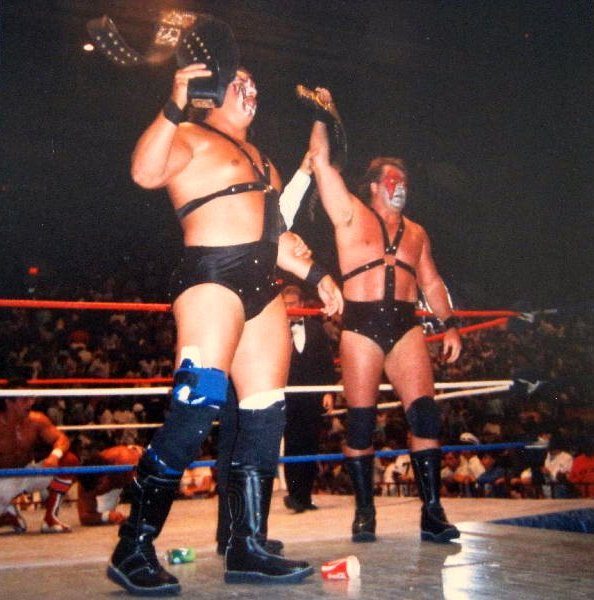
- Smash (left) and Ax as WWF Tag Team Champions

Tag team
- Members: Ax; Smash; Smash (original); Crush; Blast
- Billed heights: Ax: 6 ft 3 in (1.91 m); Smash: 6 ft 2 in (1.88 m); Crush: 6 ft 6 in (1.98 m)
- Billed from: Parts Unknown
- Debut: January 4, 1987
- Disbanded: May 6, 2017

Demolition was an American professional wrestling tag team most prominent during the late 1980s and early 1990s in the World Wrestling Federation (WWF, now WWE) made up of Ax (Bill Eadie), Smash (Barry Darsow), replacing founder member Randy Colley), and later Crush (Brian Adams). In the WWF, Demolition were three-time WWF World Tag Team Champions, and hold the record for the most combined days as reigning champions with that championship.

Their first reign with the WWF World Tag Team Championship is the fourth longest reign with any male tag team championship in WWE history (behind Mark Coffey and Wolfgang's reign with the NXT UK Tag Team Championship, The New Day's reign with the WWE (Raw) Tag Team Championship and The Usos' reign with the WWE SmackDown Tag Team Championship) and is the longest reign on record for that specific championship (which has been defunct since 2010). Beginning in 2007, Ax and Smash reunited for several appearances at various independent shows and legends conventions.

In April 2026, Demolition was inducted into the WWE Hall of Fame Class of 2026, with Ax and Smash as the inducted members.

== Career ==
=== World Wrestling Federation (1987–1991) ===
==== Formation and early push (1987–1988) ====
Randy Colley and Bill Eadie created the Demolition gimmick and worked for the World Wrestling Federation (WWF). They debuted as a heel tag team on January 4, 1987, at the Springfield Civic Centre in Massachusetts, alongside manager Luscious Johnny V, defeating the team of The Islanders and later participating in a battle royal won by Pete Doherty. Demolition wore studded black leather outfits and leather-covered hockey masks to the ring, which they removed to reveal face paint usually made up of some combination of black, white, red, or silver colors, though other colors were sometimes included. The tag team wore outfits similar to Lord Humungus of the 1981 film Mad Max 2: The Road Warrior, while their facepaint was reminiscent of hard rock band KISS. However, in TV interviews the characters generally compared themselves to another hockey-masked horror movie villain, Jason Voorhees of the Friday the 13th film series, as well as Freddy Krueger of Nightmare on Elm Street.

After only two more matches (wins over enhancement talent at TV tapings on January 5 and 6) and some TV interviews for upcoming matches, Colley was replaced with Barry Darsow starting with a match filmed January 26, 1987 at the Sundome, Tampa FL and aired on the February 14, 1987 edition of Superstars. Eadie has stated that Colley was replaced because he was too recognizable to the fans as the man who previously performed as Moondog Rex. The WWF pitched a few potential replacements to Eadie, but he thought fans would recognize the suggested replacements. However, Eadie felt that many WWF fans would not recognize Darsow, who had been working for Jim Crockett Promotions as Krusher Khruschev alongside Nikita Koloff. Darsow had left Crockett following a dispute in order to take over the role of Smash. On the March 14 Saturday Night's Main Event X, Demolition participated in another battle royal, won by Hercules Hernandez. Around that same period, Johnny Valiant (who went on to manage the "new Dream Team" of Greg Valentine and Dino Bravo before leaving the WWF at the end of 1987) sold their contracts to Mr. Fuji who became their manager.

Demolition's undefeated streak ended when they suffered their first pinfall loss to The Can-Am Connection (Rick Martel and Tom Zenk) on June 6, 1987, at the Boston Garden, Demolition became known for their aggressive style in the ring and the way that they dominated their matches. Their first feud was with the team of Ken Patera and Billy Jack Haynes, which started after Ax and Smash brutalized WWF jobber Brady Boone (billed in storyline as the cousin of Haynes), during a televised match and then battered first Haynes and then Patera when they each tried to come to the rescue. Demolition claimed victories over all of the established face tag teams in the WWF at the time, including The Killer Bees (Jim Brunzell and B. Brian Blair), The Rougeau Brothers (Jacques and Raymond), the British Bulldogs (Dynamite Kid and Davey Boy Smith), the Young Stallions (Paul Roma and Jim Powers), The Islanders (Haku and Tama), and The Can-Am Connection.

Demolition made their pay-per-view debut at Survivor Series in an elimination tag team match as part of the heel team. They eliminated The Rougeau Brothers, but were disqualified when Smash shoved down referee Dave Hebner during the match and the face team went on to win the match.

==== Tag team title reigns (1988–1990) ====
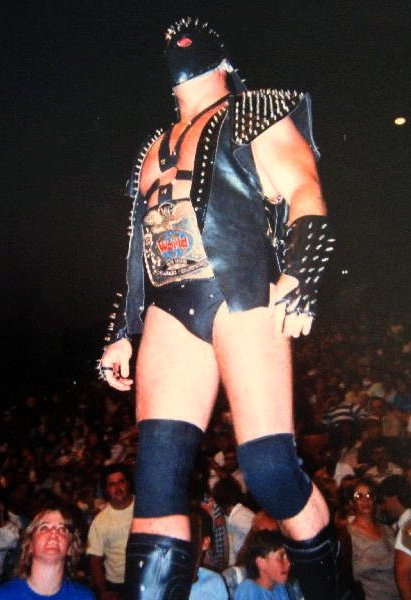
Demolition was known for their distinctive outfits (as worn in this image by Ax) which involved an entrance mask as well as red and silver face paint.

At WrestleMania IV, Ax and Smash defeated Strike Force (Rick Martel and Tito Santana) to win their first WWF Tag Team Championship. Ax struck Martel in the back of the neck with Fuji's cane while he had Smash in a Boston crab (Fuji had dropped the cane into the ring while taking a beating from Santana who carried on oblivious to what was happening in the ring). Martel was knocked out and Smash covered him for the pin while Ax hid outside with the cane. As champions, they defeated a number of the top teams of the WWF, which at the time had a very talent-rich and hotly contested tag division, most notably the British Bulldogs and Hart Foundation (Bret Hart and Jim Neidhart).

Their first big challenge came in the summer of 1988, when The Powers of Pain (The Warlord and The Barbarian) entered the WWF and challenged them for the Tag Team Championship. The Powers, formerly heels in Jim Crockett Promotions, had been brought in as mercenary babyfaces by Strike Force to avenge both the title loss and an injury (kayfabe) to Martel which Demolition had inflicted on June 1, 1988, during a title defence in Oakland, California. During the elimination tag team match at Survivor Series, Mr. Fuji attacked Demolition and joined forces with the Powers of Pain. A double turn took place as Demolition turned face while the Powers of Pain turned heel. Interviewed after the contest, Fuji claimed that he had turned on Demolition because, since winning the championship, they had become insubordinate and disrespectful towards him, whereas the Powers would be utterly obedient and loyal apprentices. For their part, Demolition denounced their former manager as a parasite, labelling him "Fuj the Stooge."

Ax and Smash also memorably squared off against each other as entrants #1 and #2 in the Royal Rumble match at the Summit in Houston in 1989, tearing into each other for the full two minutes before being joined in the ring by the third entrant André the Giant, where they once again joined as Demolition and targeted the big man.

Demolition defeated the Powers of Pain and Mr. Fuji in a tag team handicap match at WrestleMania V to retain the WWF World Tag Team Championship when they caught Fuji in the "Demolition Decapitation". That day, Demolition became the longest reigning WWF World Tag Team Champions after breaking the previous 370 day record of The Valiant Brothers (Jimmy and Johnny). Subsequently, on May 2 Demolition's reign exceeded the 399-day third reign of The Fabulous Kangaroos with the WWWF United States Tag Team Championship, thus becoming the longest running holders of any male tag team championship in WWF/WWWF history. They would eventually last a reign of 478 days, and while the general record for any male tag team championship has since been broken (by The New Day in 2016, by Mark Coffey and Wolfgang in 2020 and by The Usos in 2022), this still stands as the specific record for the "classic" World tag team title of 1971–2010.

After WrestleMania V, Demolition started a feud with The Twin Towers (Akeem and The Big Boss Man) and then a feud with The Brain Busters (Arn Anderson and Tully Blanchard), who were managed by Bobby "The Brain" Heenan. On the May 27, 1989 Saturday Night's Main Event XXI, the Brain Busters defeated Demolition by disqualification. They finally dropped the titles to the Brain Busters in a two out of three falls match on the July 29 Saturday Night's Main Event XXII (filmed July 18, 1989 in Worcester, Massachusetts at the Worcester Centrum) following outside interference from André the Giant who threw a chair into the ring for Anderson to use on Smash. As well as looking to regain the belts, Demolition sought revenge on André and closure on The Twin Towers. At SummerSlam 1989, King Duggan and Demolition defeated André and the Towers in a six-man tag team match (already advertised prior to the title change) where Darsow showcased his strength by body slamming both of the Twin Towers. Demolition focused on regaining the tag titles and restarted their feud with the Brain Busters. On the November 4 edition of Superstars (taped on October 2), Demolition defeated the Brain Busters to regain their tag titles and win their second WWF Tag Team Championship.

Demolition next feuded with the new Heenan Family team, The Colossal Connection (André the Giant and Haku). On the December 30 edition of Superstars (taped on December 13), Demolition lost the tag titles to the Colossal Connection. At WrestleMania VI at the SkyDome in Toronto, Demolition defeated the Colossal Connection to regain the titles and win their third and final WWF World Tag Team Championship, and finally put an end to their feud with the Heenan Family. Due to his deteriorating physical condition, André never tagged in during the match with Haku facing Demolition on his own.

==== Addition of Crush (1990–1991) ====
Shortly after WrestleMania VI, the team quietly turned heel. This intensified when Brian Adams debuted in WWF and joined the team as Crush. In kayfabe it was claimed that this was a heinous scheme to gain a three-on-two advantage over other tag teams. (In reality, it was actually because Eadie had developed an allergy to shellfish which he attributed to his frequent trips to Japan, which hospitalized him, and WWF owner and head booker Vince McMahon wanted to add a third member to the team just in case the illness put Eadie out of action for an extended period of time.)

Crush soon took a more active role, teaming with Smash while Ax faded into the background, becoming more of a manager. At this time Demolition used the "Freebird rule" to allow any two members to wrestle the matches. Smash and Crush defended the titles in the summer of 1990. On the July 28 edition of Saturday Night's Main Event, Smash and Crush defeated The Rockers (Shawn Michaels and Marty Jannetty) to retain the titles after Ax interfered on their behalf and scored the pin on Michaels. The next month at SummerSlam, however, Demolition lost the titles to the Hart Foundation in a two out of three falls match. In that match, Smash & Crush started, but Ax secretly came down later on to substitute himself into the match behind the referee's back. Ultimately, the Legion of Doom (Hawk and Animal), who had signed with the WWF a month earlier, interfered and snuffed out the deception. Demolition never recaptured the titles after this loss.

As a result of the interference by LOD, Demolition began feuding with Hawk and Animal who would often be joined in six man matches by reigning WWF Champion Ultimate Warrior. WWF commentators at the time would often claim that the team wearing the face paint would win whichever particular match they were broadcasting (Demolition, LOD and Warrior all wore face paint). On the October 13 edition of Saturday Night's Main Event, Ax, Smash, and Crush lost to Ultimate Warrior and LOD.

Soon after, due to the Legion of Doom (L.O.D.) now being on the WWF roster, Demolition's popularity began to decline and they regained the managerial services of Mr. Fuji in the fall of 1990. At Survivor Series, the Perfect Team (Demolition and Mr. Perfect) was defeated by the Ultimate Warriors (Ultimate Warrior, the "Texas Tornado" Kerry Von Erich, and the Legion of Doom). Shortly after, Ax left the WWF, with the on-air explanation being an order from kayfabe WWF President Jack Tunney that there could only be two members of Demolition. Smash and Crush were the two remaining members, and went on to primarily lose to teams such as the Rockers and the Legion of Doom. The team lost a match to Genichiro Tenryu and Koji Kitao at WrestleMania VII.

The team's next match was at WWF/SWS Wrestlefest on March 30, 1991, where they defeated Shunji Takano & Shinichi Nakano. Following this match, Demolition would continue to wrestle in the SWS throughout the summer usually on the losing end of matches. Crush went on a leave of absence from the WWF (his SWS commitments aside), while Smash wrestled in singles matches (usually on the losing end) for a brief time before also leaving the WWF. As well as SWS, they also teamed in the WWC after leaving the WWF. The team's final WWF-related match occurred on an SWS show in Japan on September 18, 1991, in a losing effort to George Takano and Shunji Takano. Afterwards, they eventually broke up and the member Crush would return to PNW (where he had previously wrestled as Brian Adams), still in his Demolition attire and paint, but as a face, where he would eventually win the PNW Heavyweight Championship Smash would later return to the WWF as the Repo Man a sneaky thief claiming to be a repossessor, in the fall of 1991. Crush would also return in the spring of 1992, still as a face, beginning a run as the popular "Kona Crush" surfer type building on Adams being a native of Hawaii). The two ended up facing off at SummerSlam 1992, with Crush getting the victory over Repo Man. Crush would later turn heel on Randy Savage and rehire Mr. Fuji as his manager in 1993, once again painting his face, only in a different pattern from his Demolition days.

=== Post-WWF ===
Original "Smash" gimmick owner Randy Colley moved to the Continental Championship Wrestling territory in late 1987 and revived his version of the Demolition character with only minor modifications as Detroit Demolition. He was managed by Downtown Bruno and stayed in the territory until the end of 1988. In May 1988 he teamed with D.I. Bob Carter to win the CWF Tag Team Championship.

Detroit Demolition feuded with Lord Humungous after Humungous turned babyface on Bruno's stable, helping (kayfabe) childhood friend Shane Douglas defeat Detroit Demolition . In retaliation, Detroit Demolition squirted ink in Humungous' eyes, causing Douglas to come to his old friend's aid, cementing their alliance. Humungous and Douglas would defeat Detroit and Carter for the tag team title in June 1988. As Darsow and Adams would do later on, Colley as Detroit Demolition also made occasional visits to the WWC in Puerto Rico. By early 1989 he had reverted to Moondog Rex and signed with WCW.

After leaving the WWF, Eadie began using the name Axis the Demolisher on the independent circuit and took in Colley as well as Richard "Le Magnifique" Charland under the name of Demolition Blast in an attempt to resurrect the Demolition name and gimmick. They were sent a cease and desist letter by the WWF once they found out. They wrestled for Universal Superstars of America where they held tag team title once. Also Demolition Hux portrayed by Garry Robbins.

In between his time as Repo Man in the WWF and his 1994–1995 stint as Blacktop Bully in WCW, Darsow wrestled as Smash in Australia for local promotion AWF in mid 1993, losing to Hawk on 14 June in Melbourne.

In the mid-1990s, Bill Eadie filed a lawsuit against the WWF for the rights of the "Demolition" name and gimmick but lost. Ax, Smash and Crush signed a deal with Jakks Pacific to make Demolition Classic Superstars action figures. Ax and Smash were together in a 2-pack for Toys R Us, each had a singles figure from series #14, and were packaged and repainted with Crush in a 3-pack for Walmart.

On April 1, 2007, Darsow and Eadie reunited for the first time in 16 years at a "Meet the Legends" event in Windsor, Ontario, Canada.

On August 13, 2007, Brian Adams was found unconscious in his Tampa, Florida home. Adams' wife found him not breathing in his bed, and summoned paramedics. The wrestler could not be revived, and was pronounced dead at the scene. Police could not immediately determine a cause of death, but noted no signs of injury.

On September 29, 2007, Darsow and Eadie reunited as the tag team Demolition for the first time in 16 years in Orlando, Florida at a United States Xtreme Wrestling event. They once again became tag team champions, defeating the Christopher Street Connection (Buff-E and Mace) to win the UXW Tag Team Championship.

On Friday, February 22, 2008, both Ax and Smash were re-united and inducted into the XWF Hall of Fame by Jack Blaze who also inducted both New Jack & Shark Boy in the same night. Later that year, XWF became LPW (Legends Pro Wrestling) where Demolition are still honored as LPW Hall of Fame Inductees- Class 2008.

Demolition teamed with One Man Gang in the 28-team King of Trios tournament held by Chikara during the weekend of February 29 and March 1 and 2, 2008 in Philadelphia, Pennsylvania. While losing the three-man tournament they did win the Tag Team gauntlet.

On November 13, 2010, Demolition appeared at WrestleRage VIII in Villa Park, Illinois with POWW Entertainment. They beat the team of Picture Perfect for the POWW Tag Team titles, but quickly lost them after the first match to the team of Trevor Blanchard and Black Iron.

On May 21, 2011, Demolition reunited at Full Impact Pro's debut iPPV In Full Force. Their match against Tony DeVito and Ralph Mosco went to a no contest when local commentator and manager Larry Dallas came out and said his men wanted revenge. The ring was stormed by Manu, Sami Callihan, Blain Rage and Joey Attel. Demolition, Devito and Mosco managed to clear the ring and beat Dallas to end the show.

On September 16, 2012, Demolition returned to Chikara, taking part in the tag team gauntlet match at the 2012 King of Trios tournament, from which they were eliminated by their old WWF rivals, The Powers of Pain.

In 2013, Demolition were set to perform for the eastern Canadian independent promotion XWA. The former champions were scheduled to make appearances in Saint John (June 6), Fredericton (June 7), Miramichi (June 8), and Bathurst (June 9).

In November 2013, their Demolition Decapitation finishing move was rated the 7th greatest Tag Team Finisher of all time.

In July 2016, Eadie and Darsow were named part of a class action lawsuit filed against WWE which alleged that wrestlers incurred traumatic brain injuries during their tenure and that the company concealed the risks of injury. The suit is litigated by attorney Konstantine Kyros, who has been involved in a number of other lawsuits against WWE. The lawsuit was dismissed by US District Judge Vanessa Lynne Bryant in September 2018.

On May 6, 2017, Demolition wrestled their last match as a tag team. Both Eadie and Darsow retired from wrestling later that year.

Colley died December 14, 2019.

On March 2, 2026, The Undertaker announced that Ax and Smash would be inductees of the WWE Hall of Fame Class of 2026.

Ax, Smash, and Crush were included in the video game WWE 2K26 as part of the game's Ringside Pass Season 2.

== Championships and accomplishments ==
See also Moondog Rex#Championships and accomplishments, Ax (wrestler)#Championships and accomplishments and Brian Adams (wrestler)#Championships and accomplishments for singles titles (and tag team titles with a non-Demolition partner) won by the original Smash, Ax and Crush respectively while using the Demolition gimmick.

The below list includes only tag team titles held by teams billed under the Demolition name and consisting purely of two or more of the members both/all using their Demolition personas. All championships and accomplishments below are by the Ax and (Darsow) Smash line-up unless otherwise noted.

- Cauliflower Alley Club
  - Tag Team Award (2015)
- Great Lakes Championship Wrestling
  - GLCW Tag Team Championship (1 time)
- Keystone State Wrestling Alliance
  - KSWA Tag Team Championship (1 time)
- Legends Pro Wrestling

XWF/LPW Hall of Fame Inductees- Class 2008 (2/22/08)

- New England Pro Wrestling Hall of Fame
  - Class of 2020
- Pro Wrestling Illustrated
  - Ranked #59 of the 100 best tag teams during the "PWI Years" in 2003
- POWW Entertainment
  - POWW Tag Team Championship (1 time)
- United States Xtreme Wrestling
  - UXW Tag Team Championship (1 time)
- Universal Superstars of Wrestling
  - USA Tag team title (1 time) – Ax and Blast
- World Wrestling Federation/WWE
  - WWF Tag Team Championship (3 times) – Crush joined team midway through third reign
  - WWE Hall of Fame (Class of 2026)

== See also ==
- Disciples of Apocalypse
- KroniK
- Stud Stable
- The Ascension
- Road Warriors
