= Colossal Connection =

Professional wrestling tag team

Tag team
- Members: André the Giant; Haku
- Billed heights: André: 7 ft 4 in (2.24 m); Haku: 6 ft 1 in (1.85 m)
- Combined billed weight: 852 lb (386 kg)
- Debut: May 1989
- Disbanded: April 1990

The Colossal Connection was a professional wrestling tag team of André the Giant and Haku who competed in the World Wrestling Federation (WWF) in 1989 and 1990. The team was managed by Bobby Heenan and a part of the Heenan Family.

== History ==
André the Giant and Haku were both members of Bobby Heenan's stable of wrestlers known as the Heenan Family, and had teamed occasionally at house shows during the spring and summer of 1989, but were formally joined as a team in October 1989 to form the Colossal Connection. This was partly done because of André's ailing health, hoping to prolong his career, but also to provide The Heenan Family with a replacement tag team to fill the void of Tully Blanchard and Arn Anderson (The Brain Busters) who were leaving the WWF to return to the NWA. The Colossal Connection appeared at The 1989 Survivor Series as part of the four-man team known as ”The Heenan Family" (along with Arn Anderson and Bobby Heenan). The team faced the ”Warriors” a team composed of the Ultimate Warrior, Jim Neidhart and The Rockers. André was quickly counted out in the opening moments of the match while Haku lasted a bit longer, but ultimately lost. Heenan was forced to wrestle at the Survivor Series as Blanchard was released by the WWF on the day of the event after testing positive for cocaine. Heenan was the last surviving member of the team, but was easily defeated by the Warrior.

After Survivor Series, the Colossal Connection challenged the two time WWF Tag Team Champions Demolition, winning the titles on December 13, 1989 (shown on TV December 30), launching them into a feud with Demolition. Demolition regained the titles at WrestleMania VI. At WrestleMania, Haku and Heenan both turned on André. During most of their matches, Haku did almost all of the wrestling, with André coming into the ring only for the finish. During the match at Wrestlemania, Haku wrestled Demolition by himself, never tagging in the Giant due to André's ongoing health problems that ultimately caused his death less than three years later. Even so, André did engage in action during that bout - both in having interfered in the match without being tagged, and after the bout whilst confronting Heenan and Haku.

While Demolition was the most frequent Colossal Connection opponent during their Tag Team championship run, André and Haku also defended against The Rockers (Shawn Michaels and Marty Jannetty) and The Hart Foundation (Bret Hart and Jim Neidhart). The Colossal Connection also faced Hulk Hogan and the Big Boss Man in a non-title match at a house show just before WrestleMania VI; Hogan and Bossman won, marking the only time (other than their WrestleMania VI match) that André and Haku lost a match as an official tag team. (The Hogan-Bossman vs. Colossal Connection match also marked one of the last matches pitting Hogan vs. André the Giant).

The WrestleMania VI match where they lost the titles to Demolition was Andre's last televised match in the WWF, although he did tag-team with Haku at least one other time, fulfilling their final contractual obligation, that coming on April 10, 1990, when the Colossal Connection wrestled Demolition for the WWF Tag Team Championship at a house show in Honolulu, Hawaii. During that match, Andre was knocked out of the ring, and Demolition won by countout; after the match, Andre and Haku fought each other, marking the end of the team. Andre went on to tag-team with Giant Baba on April 13 at a combined WWF/All Japan/New Japan show in Tokyo, Japan; the Andre-Giant Baba team defeated Demolition in a non-title match when Andre pinned Smash. Later that year Andre retired from wrestling and was released by the company in late 1991. Haku would form The Faces of Fear with the Barbarian.

== Championships and accomplishments ==
- World Wrestling Federation

- WWF World Tag Team Championship (1 time)

== See also ==
- The Dungeon of Doom
- The Faces of Fear
- The Heenan Family
- The Islanders
- The MFTs
