= WWF Superstars of Wrestling =

- Title card circa 1992 (after name shortening)
- Also known as: Maple Leaf Wrestling (Canada)
- Genre: Professional wrestling
- Created by: Vince McMahon
- Starring: World Wrestling Federation alumni
- Country of origin: United States
- Original language: English
- No. of seasons: 16
- No. of episodes: 780

Production
- Running time: 60 minutes (inc. commercials)
- Production company: Titan Sports

Original release
- Network: Syndicated (1986–96); USA Network (1996–2000); TNN (2000–01)
- Release: September 6, 1986 – August 19, 2001

Related
- WWF Championship Wrestling (1972–86)

WWF Superstars of Wrestling, or simply Superstars of Wrestling, is an American professional wrestling television program that was produced by the World Wrestling Federation (WWF, now WWE). It debuted on September 6, 1986, as the flagship program of the WWF's syndicated programming, featuring original matches and storyline development taped at various arenas. This format ran until March 9, 1997, shortly after the show moved to cable network USA, after which Superstars of Wrestling was repackaged into a magazine-style recap show of other WWF programming. In the early 1990s, the program's name was shortened to WWF Superstars, (Note: Also known simply as Superstars, as Maple Leaf Wrestling in Canada, and additionally referred to as Sunday Morning Superstars after its launch on USA Network.) later leading to a legal dispute over the previous "Superstars of Wrestling" name.

== History ==
=== Original format ===
In September 1986, Superstars replaced WWF Championship Wrestling. Before that, WWF Superstars of Wrestling was the name of a weekly recap show hosted by Vince McMahon (or Gene Okerlund) and Lord Alfred Hayes that lasted from 1984 through August 1986, when it was rebranded as WWF Wrestling Spotlight. The new version of Superstars was the program on which many angles began and (at times) ended. The show also hosted a number of championship matches, though the majority of title changes took place at pay-per-view events (e.g. WrestleMania or SummerSlam) or Saturday Night's Main Event.

Matches primarily saw top-tier and mid-level talent vs. "jobbers" (wrestlers who usually lost), pre-taped interviews with the WWF's roster of superstars, and promos featuring the wrestlers. At times, there would be a "feature" match between top or mid-level WWF talents. As with all syndicated WWF programming, one of the show's primary goals was to promote house shows and TV tapings in each market.

Beginning with the April 18, 1992 episode, the program was renamed to WWF Superstars, due to a successful lawsuit by another promoter, Albert Patterson, who had claimed prior rights to the phrase "Superstars of Wrestling". Since then, archival footage of the program has usually been shown with the words "of Wrestling" blurred out where applicable. When the WWF introduced Monday Night Raw on USA Network in January 1993, the live program usurped Superstars to become the company's flagship program and the primary source of storyline development and pay-per-view buildup.

==== Canada and overseas broadcasts ====
During its syndication run, the program was re-branded and aired in some parts of Canada as Maple Leaf Wrestling (essentially replacing a program of the same name filmed in southern Ontario), despite having almost no Canadian content other than interviews promoting matches that were to be held in Canada, along with occasional program-exclusive matches taped at Maple Leaf Gardens in Toronto, Ontario. However, this repackaging was, at the time, sufficient to allow the program to count towards Canadian content requirements for local television stations. Some Canadian viewers were able to watch American feeds of the show.

Superstars of Wrestling also began airing in 1986 in the United Kingdom on Saturday nights on Sky Channel. For a short time, it was shown on Tuesdays on Eurosport. Early in the 1990s, it was featured in a Friday night time slot. In the mid-1990s, Superstars was then moved to a Sunday morning time slot. For most of it original run in the United Kingdom Gorilla Monsoon was the play-by-play commentator with various color commentators throughout its history. The show also aired in Germany on RTL 2.

=== Change in format ===
Beginning September 22, 1996, Superstars left syndication and moved to pay TV channel USA Network to replace the recently cancelled WWF Action Zone, airing on Sunday mornings. The final Superstars episode with original matches was taped on February 26, 1997, in Berlin and aired on March 9. After this, Superstars became solely a post-produced summary program and continued in that manner for the remainder of its run. This occurred simultaneously with the expansion of Monday Night Raw to two hours, and two months after the debut of another arena show, Shotgun Saturday Night.

Under this repackaged format, WWF Superstars featured weekly summaries of Raw, Shotgun Saturday Night, and later also SmackDown! after the premiere of that show, and (along with WWF LiveWire) were designed with younger viewers in mind. International broadcasts of Superstars also featured full Shotgun Saturday Night matches and had different commentary. As of 2000, WWF Superstars was broadcasting internationally with several partner broadcasters including BSkyB (Britain), Premiere World (Germany), TVB (Hong Kong) and Canal+ (France).

When the WWF moved its domestic cable TV contract to TNN (later known as Spike, now known as the Paramount Network) on October 1, 2000, Superstars moved with it, alongside sister programs Raw and LiveWire. WWF Superstars's final domestic broadcast was on August 19, 2001 (as with LiveWire), both replaced by a new Saturday night magazine show called WWF Excess. Superstars continued overseas per requirements with international broadcasters. In the UK, it continued until December 2002 when it was replaced by Heat in January 2003.

== Trademark infringement ==
WWE abandoned the Superstars of Wrestling trademark when they changed the show's name to WWF Superstars in the early 1990s. Albert Patterson, a Wisconsin independent wrestling promoter, successfully trademarked the phrase in 1993. Although there has been litigation between the WWE and Patterson, WWE has not been able to settle with Patterson for the usage of "Superstars of Wrestling". Due to this issue, WWE blurs the Superstars of Wrestling banners when archival content is shown on the WWE Network. In April 2025, Patterson lost the rights to the trademark after the registrant did not renew the trademark.

== Title changes ==
Many of these title changes were not aired for up to several weeks after they took place. As these shows were aired in an era before the Internet was popularized, the previous title holder sometimes defended his title at house shows as though he were still the champion until the title change was aired on television.

- The Hart Foundation (Bret "Hitman" Hart and Jim "The Anvil" Neidhart) defeating the British Bulldogs (Dynamite Kid and Davey Boy Smith) for the WWF World Tag Team Championship on February 7, 1987 (taped January 26, 1987).
- The Honky Tonk Man defeating Ricky "The Dragon" Steamboat for the WWF Intercontinental Heavyweight Championship on June 13, 1987 (taped June 2, 1987).
- Strike Force (Rick Martel and Tito Santana) defeating the Hart Foundation for the WWF World Tag Team Championship on November 7, 1987 (taped October 27, 1987).
- Demolition (Ax and Smash) defeating the Brain Busters (Arn Anderson and Tully Blanchard) for the WWF World Tag Team Championship on November 4, 1989 (taped October 2, 1989).
- The Colossal Connection (André the Giant and Haku) defeating Demolition for the WWF World Tag Team Championship on December 30, 1989 (taped December 13, 1989).
- Mr. Perfect defeating Tito Santana for the vacant WWF Intercontinental Heavyweight Championship on May 19, 1990 (taped April 23, 1990).
- Mr. Perfect defeating Kerry Von Erich for the WWF Intercontinental Heavyweight Championship on December 15, 1990 (taped November 19, 1990).
- Diesel defeating Razor Ramon for the WWF Intercontinental Championship on April 30, 1994 (taped April 13, 1994).

== Commentators ==
The commentary team on Superstars underwent many changes as the years passed. The hosts of Superstars are listed below in chronological order along with their debut episode.

- Vince McMahon, Jesse "The Body" Ventura, and Bruno Sammartino (September 6, 1986)
- McMahon and Ventura (March 19, 1988)
- McMahon and Rowdy Roddy Piper (August 25, 1990)
- McMahon, Piper, and "The Mouth of the South" Jimmy Hart (for one week only)
- McMahon, Piper, and The Honky Tonk Man (December 8, 1990) (only lasts through January 19, 1991)
- McMahon, Piper, and "Macho Man" Randy Savage (March 30, 1991)
- McMahon, Piper, and Mr. Perfect (November 30, 1991)
- McMahon and Mr. Perfect (December 14, 1991)
- McMahon and Bobby "The Brain" Heenan (briefly, after Mr. Perfect's face turn in 1992)
- McMahon, Heenan and Jerry "The King" Lawler (December 12, 1992)
- McMahon, Savage, and Lawler (January 2, 1993)
- McMahon and Lawler (October 23, 1993)
- McMahon and Reo Rodgers (for one week only)
- McMahon and Stan Lane (November 27, 1993)
- McMahon and Johnny Polo
- McMahon and Dok Hendrix (April 15, 1995)
- McMahon, Jim Ross, and Lawler
- McMahon, Ross, and Hennig (December 2, 1995)
- Ross and Hennig
- Ross and Jim Cornette (November 10, 1996)

== Interviewers ==
- "Mean" Gene Okerlund (1986–1993)
- Ken Resnick (1986–1987)
- Craig DeGeorge (1987–1988)
- Sean Mooney (1988–1993)
- Stan Lane (1993–1995)
- Todd Pettengill (1993–1997)

== Streaming media ==
In January 2019, select episodes of WWF Superstars starting from April 1992 became available for streaming on the WWE Network. As of September 25, 2023, there are 339 episodes of Superstars available for streaming on WWE Network, dating from April 18, 1992, to February 16, 1997 (omitting the September 14, 1996 "Best of Superstars" episode which was the last in syndication before the program was moved to the USA Network).
