= Brain Busters =

Professional wrestling tag team

Statistics
- Members: Arn Anderson; Tully Blanchard
- Name(s): The Brain Busters; Arn Anderson and Tully Blanchard
- Billed heights: Arn: 6 ft 1 in (1.85 m); Tully: 5 ft 10 in (1.78 m)
- Combined billed weight: 475 lb (215 kg; 33.9 st)
- Debut: 1986
- Years active: 1986-1989

The Brain Busters was the World Wrestling Federation (WWF) name for the professional wrestling tag team of Arn Anderson and Tully Blanchard. Anderson and Blanchard adopted this name after joining the WWF in 1988 after leaving Jim Crockett Promotions, where the two men had wrestled as part of The Four Horsemen stable and had won the NWA World Tag Team Championship twice. As a team, Anderson and Blanchard are regarded by WWE as three-time world tag team champions, having won the WWF Tag Team Championship during their time in the WWF.

== History ==
=== National Wrestling Alliance (1986-1988) ===
Arn Anderson and Tully Blanchard were founding members of the Four Horsemen, and often teamed up for six and eight man tag team matches with Ric Flair and Ole Anderson. Blanchard was the number two heel in the NWA, behind only NWA World Heavyweight Champion Ric Flair, winning the NWA United States Heavyweight Championship, the NWA National Heavyweight Championship and the NWA World Television Championship. Meanwhile, Anderson was designated as the "Enforcer" of the stable, and teamed with Ole Anderson as the final version of The Minnesota Wrecking Crew. In the spring of 1987, Ole was kicked out of the Four Horsemen, and was replaced with associate member Lex Luger. Shortly after losing the Television Title, Blanchard quickly began teaming with Arn and targeted the NWA World Tag Team titles.

==== First reign ====
Tully and Arn won the NWA World Tag Team Championship on September 29, 1987 by defeating The Rock 'n' Roll Express after The Midnight Express attacked Ricky Morton prior to the match. They were immediately challenged by The Road Warriors to a title match at Starrcade '87 in the LOD hometown of Chicago. Despite a hostile pro LOD crowd, the Horsemen retained the titles on a reverse decision. The Horseman would next receive a stiff challenge from ex-Horsemen Lex Luger, and longtime Horseman rival Barry Windham, who were dubbed the Twin Towers. The teams met at Clash of the Champions I live on TBS and the challengers upset the Horsemen, when heel miscommunication caused Anderson to get hit by a chair from Horsemen manager J. J. Dillon, and pinned by Luger.

==== Second reign ====
Arn and Tully regained the titles less than a month later on April 20, 1988 when Barry Windham turned on his tag-team partner and joined the Four Horsemen. The duo would mainly defend the titles against various combinations of teams between the trio of Sting, Nikita Koloff and "Dr. Death" Steve Williams. Things began to sour behind the scenes for the champions, as the National Wrestling Alliance (NWA) launched its first-ever uninterrupted pay-per-view, The Great American Bash, promoters were attempting to draw a large gate and, according to the DVD Ric Flair and The Four Horsemen, Blanchard had suggested a rematch with the Road Warriors, but instead they were booked against Sting and Koloff, (whom they wrestled to a time limit draw), and when the PPV payouts were given out, it was discovered that Dillon who was their manager received 3 times the payout of the 2-time World Tag Team Champions. This was the last straw for Blanchard, who saw this as an insult and immediately prepared to give his notice. Meanwhile, on camera, the champions had begun a feud with NWA United States Tag Team champions The Midnight Express, with the storyline being that Anderson and Blanchard considered the Midnight Express to be ungrateful punks who weren't on their level. The Midnight Express won the titles from the Horsemen on September 10, 1988, as both Blanchard and Anderson gave their notices to Jim Crockett Promotions, ending the original Four Horsemen and according to Blanchard, it was the end of an era.

=== World Wrestling Federation (1988-1989) ===
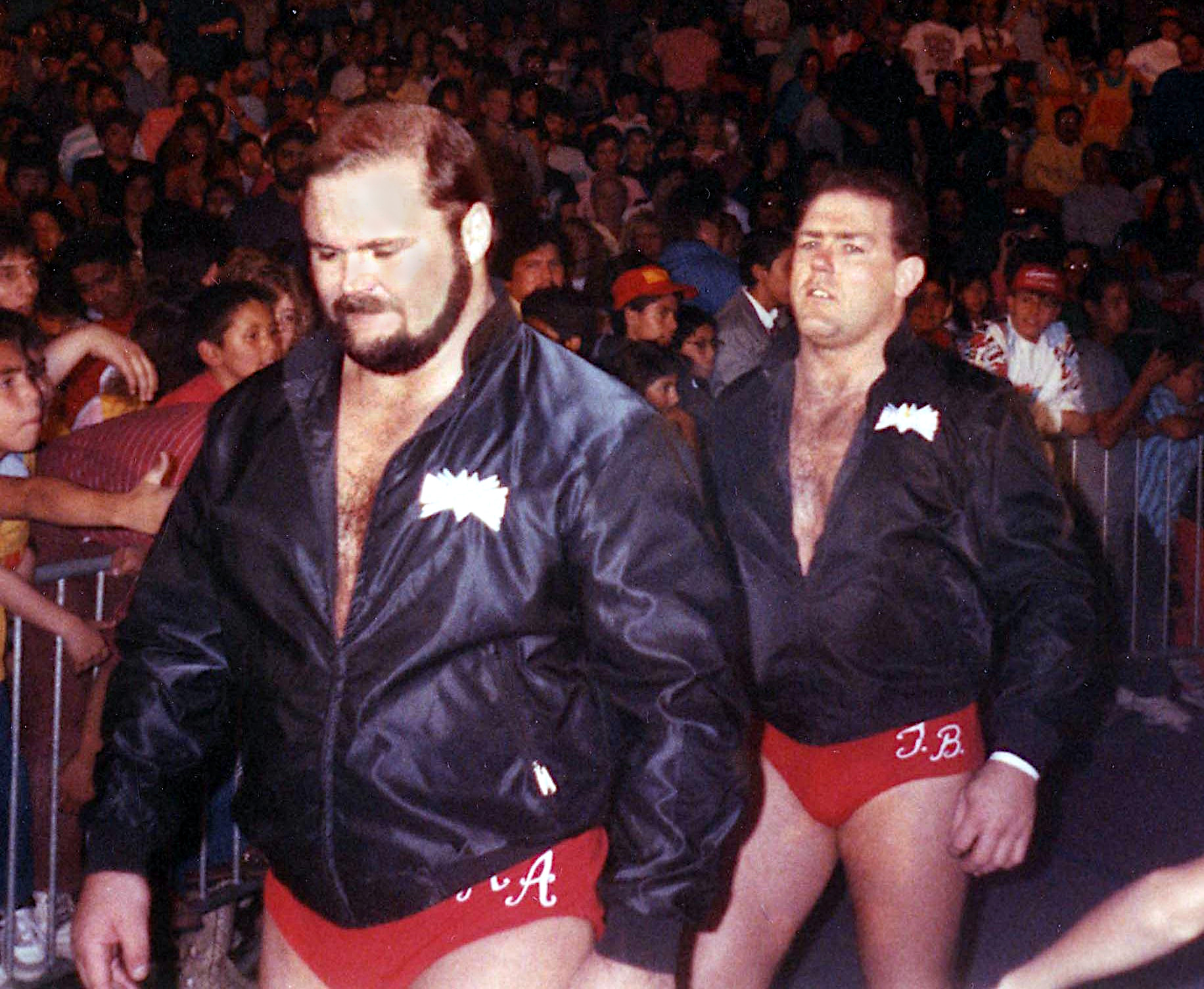
Arn Anderson (left) and Tully Blanchard in March 1989

The duo made their debut late in October 1988, as "The Brain Busters", due to being under management of Bobby "The Brain" Heenan (and, by default, members of the Heenan Family). It was commonplace for the WWF at this time to assign wrestlers to some sort of gimmick, or new identity. Aside from the Brain Busters team name, Anderson and Blanchard were allowed to keep their names and ring persona. The only changes Arn and Tully made to their style were pointing to their heads to show they were smarter than everyone else and the use of a spike piledriver as a finishing move.

The Brain Busters made their pay-per-view (PPV) debut at the 1988 Survivor Series in the 10 team tag match, where they eliminated the Hart Foundation, before being eliminated via double disqualification with the Rockers. This led to a match with the Rockers on WWF Superstars of Wrestling where both teams were again disqualified before the match could even get started. This kicked off a red hot series of house show matches. One match in particular on January 23, 1989 at Madison Square Garden was rated as one of the 50 greatest matches in the Pro Wrestling Illustrated (PWI) 10th anniversary issue, where the Brain Busters narrowly defeated the Rockers as Anderson held down Marty Jannetty's leg as Blanchard pinned him. The teams wrestled to a double countout on the March 11, 1989 Saturday Night's Main Event XX.

The Brain Busters made their first and only WrestleMania appearance at WrestleMania V against former WWF Tag Team Champions Strike Force. After an even start, the Brain Busters dominated the ex-champions as Rick Martel walked out on Tito Santana and he was brutalized and beaten after a spike piledriver and eventually pinned.

After their WrestleMania win, the Brain Busters finally got to face the WWF World Tag Team Champions Demolition and defeated them by disqualification on the May 27, 1989 Saturday Night's Main Event XXI. The Brain Busters defeated Demolition for the titles in a rematch on July 18, 1989 in a two out of three falls match. After losing the first fall, by pinfall, the Busters won the second fall, via disqualification, and won the third fall, with a distraction from Bobby Heenan and a steel chair thrown in from André the Giant, the Brain Busters ended Demolition's then-record-breaking 478-day title reign and became the first team to win both the WWF and NWA World Tag Team Championship. It also was the first time a title changed hands in a two-out-of-three falls match where one of the decisions ended in a disqualification. After then defeating The Hart Foundation in a non-title match at SummerSlam, they then lost the titles back to Demolition on October 2, 1989, in an equally controversial fashion as Blanchard, who was the illegal man, was pinned after receiving the Demolition Decapitation finisher. As was customary at the time, the Busters continued to defend the titles on house shows until the title change was acknowledged on television on November 4, 1989.

==== Split ====
Their last match was a best-of-three-falls contest against The Rockers on Saturday Night's Main Event XXIV. The Brain Busters lost the first fall after not following directions from an enraged Heenan, who left the ringside area. The Brain Busters won the second fall, after which Heenan fired them during a backstage interview. The Rockers would go on to win the third and final fall of the match. On November 1, 1989, Tully Blanchard failed a drug test and the lack of a suitable replacement saw him replaced by Heenan who would wrestle for the first time since WrestleMania V. Arn Anderson left the federation more or less immediately after the pay-per-view and returned to the NWA in December. However, the NWA refused to rehire Blanchard when news of his failed drug test became known, thus ending the Brain Busters for good. Tully Blanchard would renegotiate a new contract with NWA a few months later, but ultimately declined what he considered to be a very low offer (reportedly half of a previous verbal agreement), and instead signed with the American Wrestling Association (AWA).

== Championships and accomplishments ==
- National Wrestling Alliance
  - NWA World Tag Team Championship (Mid-Atlantic version) (2 times)
- Pro Wrestling Illustrated
  - Tag Team of the Year (1989)
  - Ranked them No. 15 of the 100 best tag teams during the PWI Years in 2003
- World Wrestling Federation/WWE
  - WWF World Tag Team Championship (1 time)
  - WWE Hall of Fame (Class of 2012) – with The Four Horsemen

== See also ==
- Anderson family
- FTR (professional wrestling)
- The Dangerous Alliance
- The Enforcers
- The Four Horsemen
- The Heenan Family
- The Minnesota Wrecking Crew
