= Sam Fatu =

American professional wrestler (born 1966)

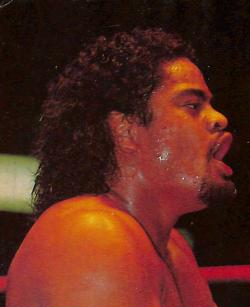
- Fatu, circa 1987

Personal information
- Born: Samuel Larry Fatu San Francisco, California, U.S.
- Spouse: Theresa Fuavai-Fatu
- Children: 4, including Jacob Fatu
- Relatives: Rikishi (brother); Umaga (brother); Jimmy Uso (nephew); Jey Uso (nephew); Solo Sikoa (nephew); Zilla Fatu (nephew); Jacob Fatu (son); Naomi (niece-in-law, by marriage)
- Family: Anoaʻi

Professional wrestling career
- Ring name(s): The Samoan Savage; The Tonga Kid; Tama; Tama Samoa; Nikozuna; Wild Samoan Nick; Wild Samoan Savage; Sam Fatu; Samoan #4
- Billed height: 6 ft 3 in (191 cm)
- Billed weight: 225 lb (102 kg)
- Billed from: "The Isle of Samoa"; Tonga
- Trained by: Afa Anoa'i; Sika Anoa'i
- Debut: 1983
- Retired: 2019

Samuel Larry Fatu (born 1966) is an American retired professional wrestler. He is best known for his appearances with the World Wrestling Federation under the ring names The Tonga Kid and Tama and with World Championship Wrestling as The Samoan Savage.

== Professional wrestling career ==
=== World Wrestling Federation (1983–1988) ===
Fatu debuted as a professional wrestler in 1983, after being trained by the Wild Samoans. Shortly after debuting he joined the World Wrestling Federation as "Samoan No. 4," in May 1983 wrestling at untelevised house shows before making his television debut in the fall of 1983 as The Tonga Kid. Billed as the cousin of Superfly Jimmy Snuka, he entered into his first major feud with Snuka's rival Roddy Piper in 1984. He left the WWF in January 1985 and went to work in other territories.

In August 1986, he returned and teamed with Tonga Fifita, who was wrestling under the name King Tonga. Fatu was renamed to Tama, while Fifita was renamed Haku. Together, they were christened The Islanders. The Islanders gained several key victories, including a tag team battle royal victory over Big John Studd and King Kong Bundy, but ultimately failed to gain the interest of fans. The two were eventually repackaged as villains in April 1987 after Bobby Heenan distracted their opponents The Can-Am Connection to help the Islanders win a match; the team was now managed by Heenan, and used an aggressive, savage style of wrestling as opposed to a scientific style.

When Tom Zenk of the Can-Am Connection left the WWF later in 1987, the Islanders continued the feud with his partner Rick Martel and ultimately with Martel's new team Strike Force with Tito Santana and while the two teams generally traded victories during the early part of the feud, once Strike Force won the WWF Tag Team Championship, the Islanders began finding themselves on the losing end, despite having several attempts. In early December 1987, the Islanders were disqualified from a match with the British Bulldogs when they kidnapped the Bulldogs' dog, Matilda. The Islanders were indefinitely suspended in the storyline until Matilda was found. From late January 1988 until early February, the Islanders were consistently beaten by the British Bulldogs.

At Saturday Night's Main Event XV on March 7, they beat The Killer Bees, a tag team consisting of B. Brian Blair and Jim Brunzell. At Wrestlemania 4, the Islanders, with Bobby Heenan, defeated the Bulldogs and Koko B. Ware, with Matilda. On April 21, Heenan introduced Siva Afi as the newest member of the group, but Afi never made another appearance with the Islanders. Fatu then left the WWF.

=== World Wrestling Council (1989) ===
After leaving the WWF, Fatu began performing for the World Wrestling Council in Puerto Rico as "Tama". On January 6, 1989, he and Dan Kroffat defeated The Batten Twins to win the WWC World Tag Team Championship. The Batten Twins regained the championship on March 4, 1989.

=== World Championship Wrestling (1989–1990) ===
In 1989, Fatu joined World Championship Wrestling, where he adopted the ring name "The Samoan Savage" and began teaming with his brother Fatu and his cousin Samu of The Samoan SWAT Team. The trio were managed by "The Big Kahuna" Oliver Humperdink. In late 1989, Samu withdrew from in-ring competition and The Samoan SWAT Team was renamed "The New Wild Samoans". At Starrcade in December 1989, The New Wild Samoans competed in the Iron Team round-robin tournament, placing third in a field of four teams.

The New Wild Samoans left WCW in the summer of 1990.

=== Later career (1990–2011, 2018–2019) ===
After leaving WCW, Fatu (wrestling as "The Samoan Savage") journeyed to Mexico to perform for the Universal Wrestling Association along with his brother Fatu and his cousin, The Great Kokina. Billed as "The Hawaiian Beasts", the trio won the UWA World Trios Championship from Los Villanos on April 7, 1991. Los Villanos regained the championship on May 31, 1991. In March 1992 with his brother Fatu returned to the WWF as the Samoan Swat Team they wrestled in two house shows against Barry Horowitz and the Brooklyn Brawler and Beverly Brothers. In July 1992, his brother Fatu, Great Kokina and Samu all went to the WWF. Fatu instead did not return nor got a contract from WWF and would go on his own.

Fatu returned to the WWF as Tonga Kid for a few house shows in 1993 against Papa Shango and Razor Ramon and 1994 teaming with Samu against The Smoking Gunns.

Fatu wrestled three matches for ECW in April 1998.

Fatu defeated Vic Grimes in a hardcore match put on by All Pro Wrestling on September 9, 2000 as part of a Samoan Pride Festival at Crockett Hills Regional Park

In 2005 and 2006, he wrestled in Italy with the Nu Wrestling Evolution promotion. Fatu competed on the independent circuit until retiring in 2011.

He returned in 2018 working in the independents and Empire Wrestling Federation in California until 2019.

== Other media ==
Fatu appeared as "The Tonga Kid" in the opening scene of the 1986 film Highlander, where he was involved in a six-man tag team match with Greg Gagne and Jim Brunzell against The Fabulous Freebirds at the Meadowlands Arena. He also starred as "Tonga Tom" in the 1987 wrestling film Body Slam, along with Dirk Benedict and Roddy Piper.

Fatu was featured in an April 2020 documentary for Vice's Dark Side of the Ring series, revealing new information on the May 1983 homicide of Nancy Argentino.

== Personal life ==
Fatu was born to Matagaono Solofa I'aulualo and Elevera Anoaʻi Fatu. He is a member of the famous Anoaʻi family and is the nephew of Sika Anoaʻi and Afa Anoaʻi, known as the Wild Samoans. He is the twin brother of Solofa Fatu Jr. (Headshrinker Fatu/Rikishi), and the older brother of the Eddie Fatu (Umaga/Jamal), who died of a heart attack on December 4, 2009. Fatu is married to Theresa Fuavai-Fatu. They have four children, two of whom are also professional wrestlers: Jacob, who currently performs for WWE, and Journey, who competes on the independent circuit.

Some of Fatu's other relatives are also involved in professional wrestling, including his twin nephews, Jonathan and Joshua, who currently perform in WWE as Jimmy and Jey Uso respectively, and their younger brother Joseph Fatu who currently performs as Solo Sikoa, his cousins Rodney Anoaʻi (Yokozuna), Afa Anoa'i Jr. (Headshrinker Manu), Samula Anoaʻi (Headshrinker Samu), Matt Anoaʻi (Rosey), Joe Anoaʻi (Roman Reigns), Reno Anoaʻi (Black Pearl), and Lloyd Anoaʻi (L.A. Smooth). Dwayne Johnson (The Rock) is also considered to be his cousin because of the blood brothership between his great grandfather Reverend Amituana'i Anoaʻi and Johnson's grandfather Peter Maivia.

In November 2008, Fatu's wife went into cardiac arrest while giving birth. Her heart stopped completely before the twins, Marley and Myracle, could be delivered by Caesarean section, but she was spontaneously revived and eventually recovered. This type of incident is very rare, with one of the cardiac surgeons who was working on Theresa saying that he had never seen surviving mothers or babies.

== Championships and accomplishments ==
- Continental Championship Wrestling
  - NWA Southeastern Tag Team Championship (3 times) - with Johnny Rich
- Texas All-Star Wrestling
  - Texas Six-Man Tag Team Championship - (1 time) with Sika and Kokina
- Universal Wrestling Association
  - UWA World Trios Championship (1 time) – with Fatu and The Great Kokina
- World Wrestling Council
  - WWC World Tag Team Championship (1 time) – with Dan Kroffat
- World Wrestling Federation
  - Slammy Award (1 time)
    - Bobby "The Brain" Heenan Scholarship Award (1987) with Haku, André the Giant, Hercules, King Kong Bundy, and Harley Race

== See also ==
- Anoaʻi family
- The Islanders
- The Samoan SWAT Team
