= Bobby Heenan =

American wrestling commentator and manager (1944–2017)

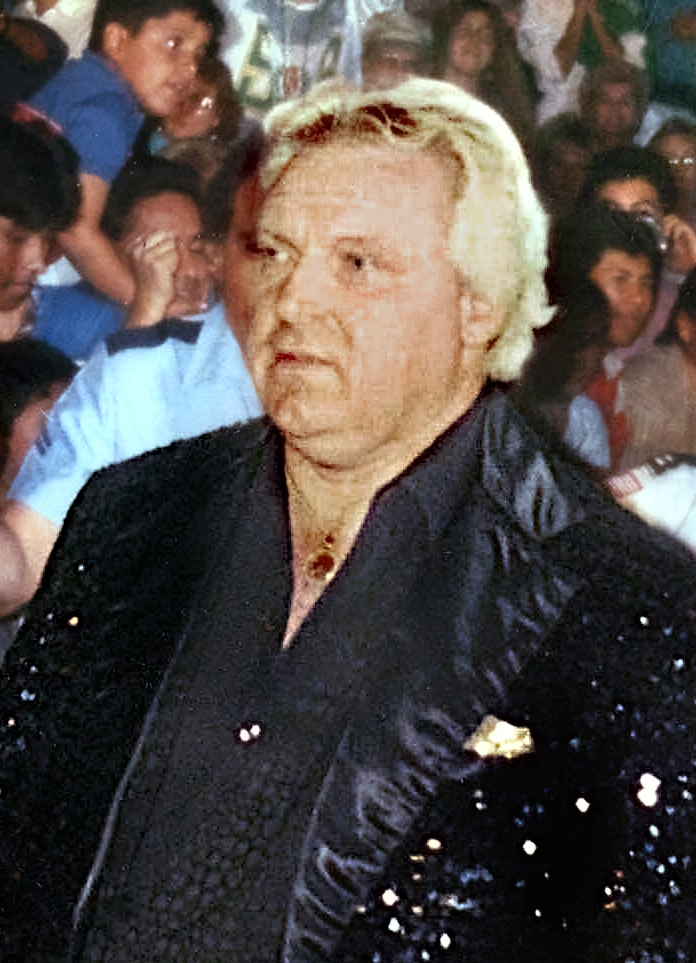
- Heenan in 1989

Personal information
- Born: Raymond Louis Heenan; November 1, 1944 Chicago, Illinois, U.S.
- Died: September 17, 2017 (aged 72) Largo, Florida, U.S.
- Spouse: Cynthia Jean (m. 1978)
- Children: 1

Professional wrestling career
- Ring name(s): Bobby "The Brain" Heenan; Ray Heenan
- Billed height: 5 ft 10 in (178 cm)
- Billed weight: 242 lb (110 kg)
- Billed from: Beverly Hills, California
- Debut: 1965
- Retired: April 1, 2001

Raymond Louis Heenan (November 1, 1944 – September 17, 2017) was an American professional wrestling manager, color commentator, and wrestler. He performed with the American Wrestling Association (AWA), the World Wrestling Federation (WWF, now WWE) and World Championship Wrestling (WCW) under the ring name Bobby "The Brain" Heenan.

Heenan was known for his skill in elevating villainous on-screen talent by drawing negative reactions for himself and his wrestlers from the crowd. He was paired with numerous wrestlers, including Nick Bockwinkel, whom he led to win the AWA World Heavyweight Championship, and he became an integral figure in the 1980s professional wrestling boom by managing King Kong Bundy and André the Giant in WWF main event matches with Hulk Hogan at WrestleMania 2 and WrestleMania III respectively. The wrestlers under his tutelage were collectively known as "The Heenan Family" at various times throughout his career.

Known for his quick wit and comedic ability, Heenan also served as a color commentator and is remembered for his on-screen repartee with Gorilla Monsoon. Outside of wrestling, Heenan authored two books, appeared on numerous television shows, and briefly hosted a parody talk show titled The Bobby Heenan Show on WWF Prime Time Wrestling. Heenan retired in 2001 at WrestleMania X-Seven after a seventeen-year stint as a commentator in professional wrestling but he continued to make sporadic appearances in several promotions. In 2002, he was diagnosed with throat cancer, which limited his appearances in later years, and died from complications of the disease in 2017. Among other honors, he has been inducted into the Professional Wrestling, WWE, and Wrestling Observer halls of fame. Multiple wrestling commentators have described him as the greatest professional wrestling manager of all time.

== Early life ==
Heenan was born in Chicago, Illinois, on November 1, 1944. His father Robert Heenan was a railroad worker, and his mother Mildred Bernadette Kambrz was a hotel manager. Heenan dropped out of school in the eighth grade to support his mother and grandmother. He grew up a fan of pro wrestling and baseball. As a fan of wrestling growing up in Chicago and Indianapolis, he started in the wrestling profession early on, carrying bags and jackets for the wrestlers, and selling refreshments at events.

== Professional wrestling career ==
=== World Wrestling Association (1965–1974) ===
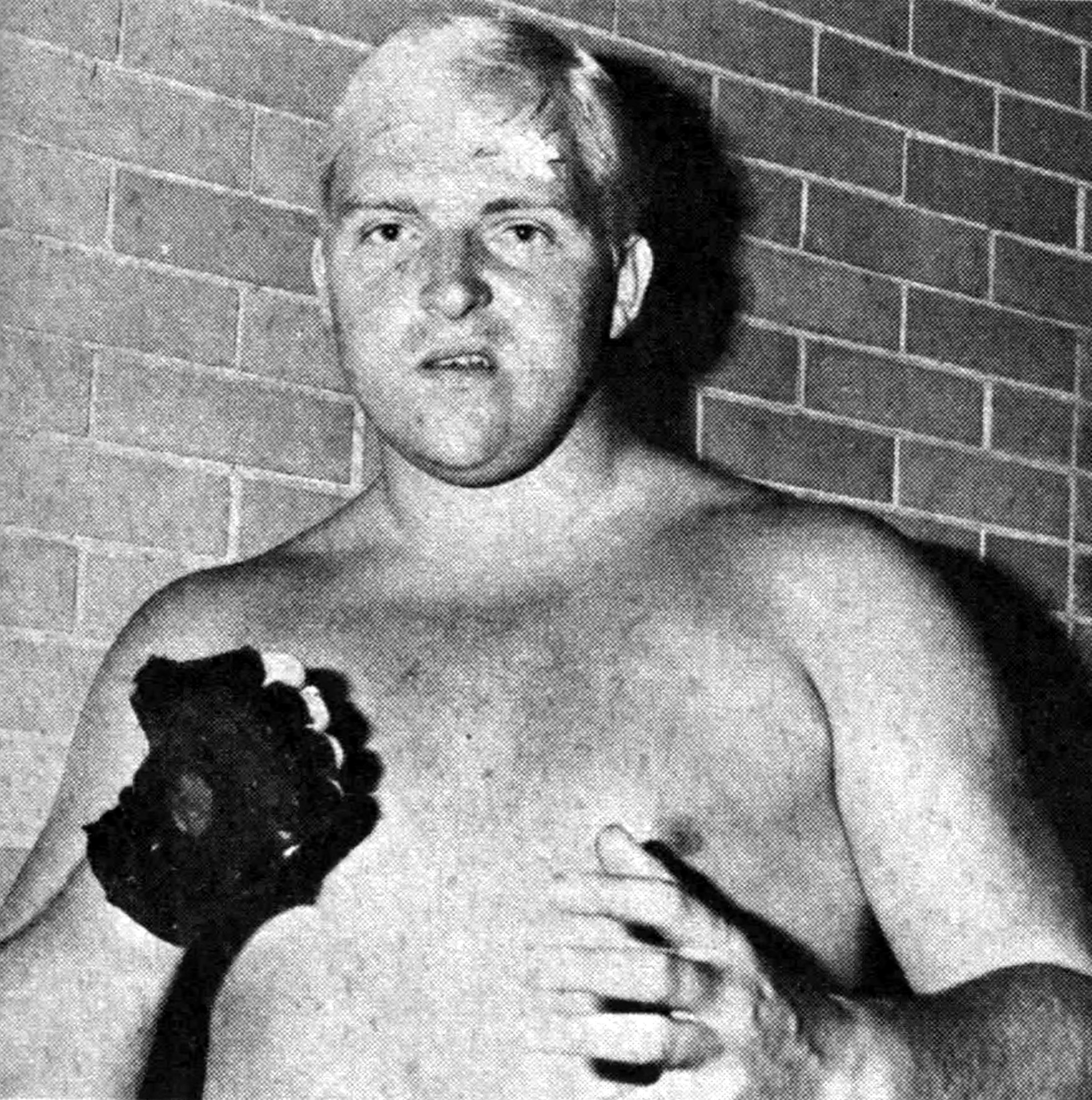
Heenan in 1973

In 1965, Heenan became a regular in William Afflis' (known by his in-ring persona Dick the Bruiser) Indianapolis-based WWA promotion under the moniker "Pretty Boy" Bobby Heenan. In 1966, he wrestled his first match against Calvin "Prince" Pullins. Heenan said he was never trained as a wrestler and it came naturally. He was booked – both as a manager and wrestler – after the promoters saw how well he handled the physical aspects of his managerial duties. During his time in WWA, he managed Angelo Poffo and Chris Markoff, the Assassins (Guy Mitchell and Joe Tomasso), The Valiant Brothers and The Blackjacks. In particular, Heenan was credited with making Blackjack Lanza one of the top wrestling villains in the country. This impressed promoter Sam Muchnick, who typically hated wrestling managers, and Heenan is believed to be the only heel manager to work in Muchnick's St. Louis Wrestling Club. He also occasionally wrestled with a storyline "brother" Guy Heenan, portrayed by Guy Mitchell, from the Assassins. In 1974, he left the WWA. He attributed his departure to a dispute with Afflis over pay for his participation in the first-ever wrestling event held at Market Square Arena, emphatically stating that he never returned to the promotion as a result.

=== American Wrestling Association (1969–1979) ===
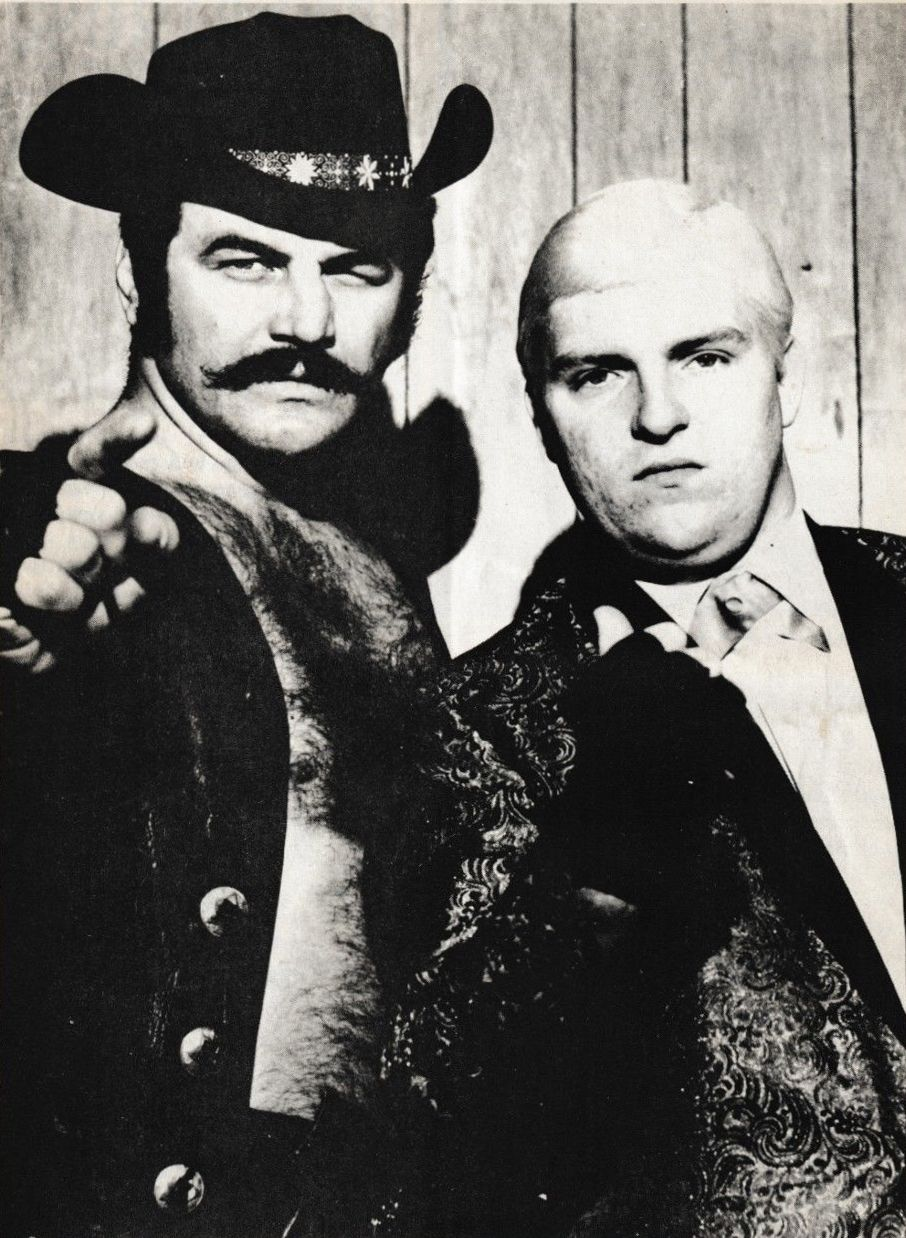
Heenan with Blackjack Lanza

After leaving WWA, Heenan announced he was now to be known as "The Brain" at his AWA debut in 1969. He took up managing the team of Nick Bockwinkel and Ray "The Crippler" Stevens, a duo which won a third AWA World Tag Team Championship under his leadership. While Bockwinkel and Stevens feuded with The Crusher and Dick the Bruiser, Bruiser famously called Heenan "Weasel"; this led to his rivals calling him "Weasel" throughout the rest of his wrestling career. The AWA was the starting point for the first incarnation of his eponymous heel stable, The Heenan Family, which initially consisted of Bockwinkel, Stevens, Bobby Duncum Sr., and Blackjack Lanza.

On January 25, 1975, an angry fan fired a gun at Heenan in Chicago's International Amphitheatre after Heenan interfered in one of Bockwinkel's matches against Verne Gagne. Heenan was unharmed, but five people sitting ringside were injured, one of them critically. Later in 1975, Bockwinkel captured his first of several AWA World Heavyweight Championships, ending the seven-year reign of perennial champion and AWA promoter Verne Gagne. While Bockwinkel was AWA Champion in 1976, Lanza and Duncum captured the AWA World Tag Team Championship, making Heenan the first manager in history to simultaneously manage both a major promotion's singles and tag team champions.

=== Georgia Championship Wrestling (1979) ===
In early 1979, Heenan left the AWA (suspended one year, in storyline) to work in Georgia Championship Wrestling (GCW). During his short tenure in GCW, Heenan managed a stable of wrestlers that included the likes of Killer Karl Kox, Masked Superstar, Ernie Ladd and Blackjack Lanza. Heenan met a young Hulk Hogan while in Georgia and later told AWA promoter Verne Gagne that he should hire him. According to Heenan, he moved his family to Atlanta after being told by GCW promoter Ole Anderson that he could work for the promotion as long as he wanted, only to release him less than a year later. Anderson admitted to releasing him but denied promising him indefinite employment.

=== Return to AWA (1979–1984) ===
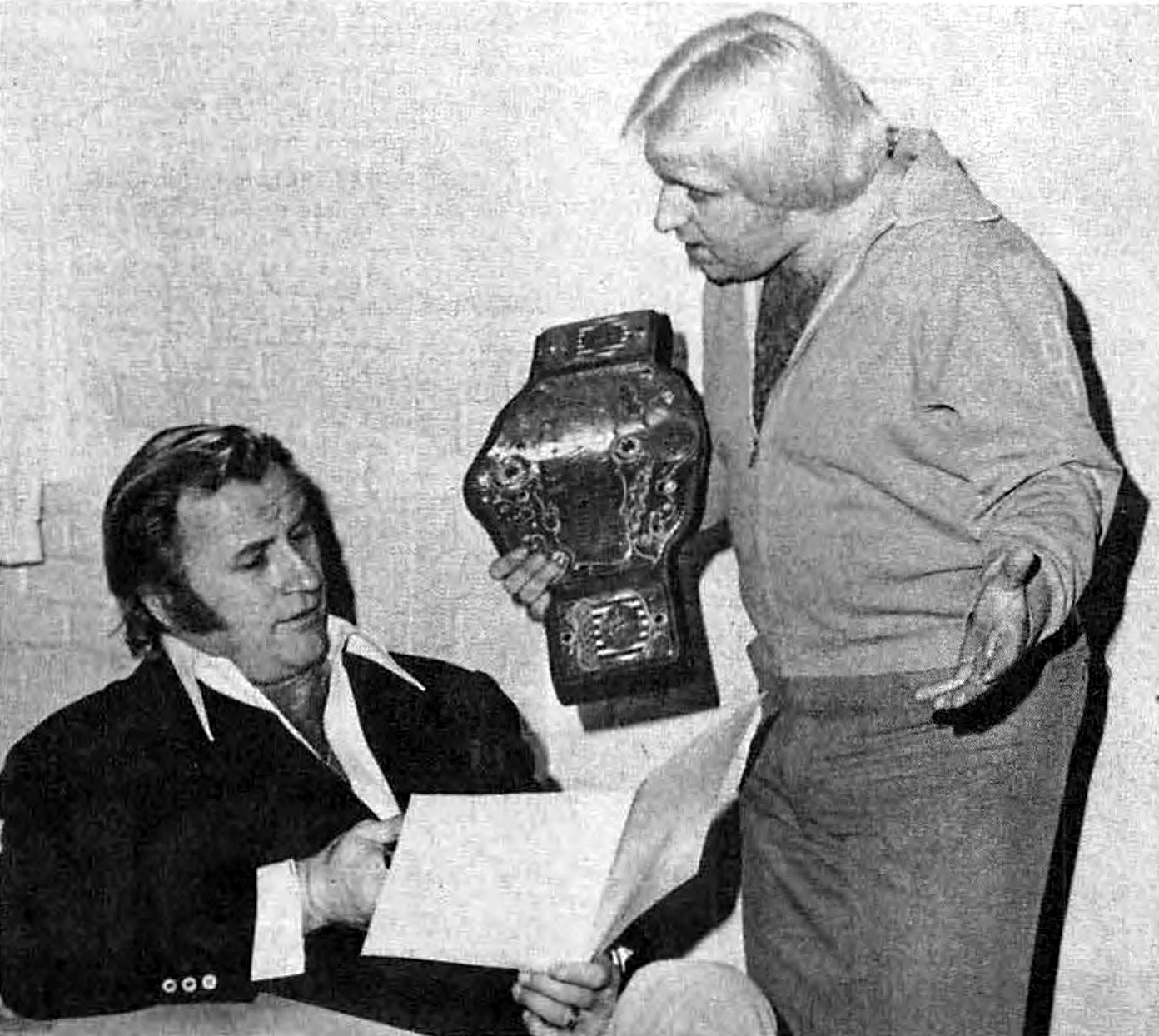
Heenan (right) with AWA World Heavyweight Champion Nick Bockwinkel

In late 1979, Heenan returned to AWA and resumed managing Nick Bockwinkel to renewed championship success, including against Hogan in 1983. During AWA's tour of Japan in 1984, Heenan suffered a neck injury in a tag-team match teaming with Harley Race with Atsushi Onita & Haku that would limit his in-ring ability going forward.

In 1984, Heenan left AWA to join the World Wrestling Federation (WWF). While most of the AWA talent left for the WWF during this time without giving proper notice (the AWA required departing talent to work a six-week notice for booking and syndication-based reasons, with most talent claiming that WWF promoter Vince McMahon paid them extra not to work out their notices with the AWA), only Heenan worked out his notice in good faith to the Gagne family. He was written out of AWA television when Wally Karbo announced on the September 28 broadcast of AWA All-Star Wrestling that Heenan had been suspended indefinitely by AWA President Stanley Blackburn for initiating an attack on The Fabulous Ones by Heenan Family members Nick Bockwinkel and Mr. Saito.

=== World Wrestling Federation (1984–1993) ===
==== Manager (1984–1993) ====
Heenan was signed by the WWF in November 1984 with the intention of him managing Jesse Ventura, however Ventura's retirement due to blood clots in his lungs prevented this from happening. Instead, Heenan managed Big John Studd (whom Heenan was best friends with in the AWA) in his feud against André the Giant. Studd challenged André to a US$15,000 bodyslam match at the first WrestleMania, with the stipulation being that André would have to retire had he lost. André won the match and then took the bag with the $15,000 and started throwing it out to the crowd before Heenan snatched the bag.

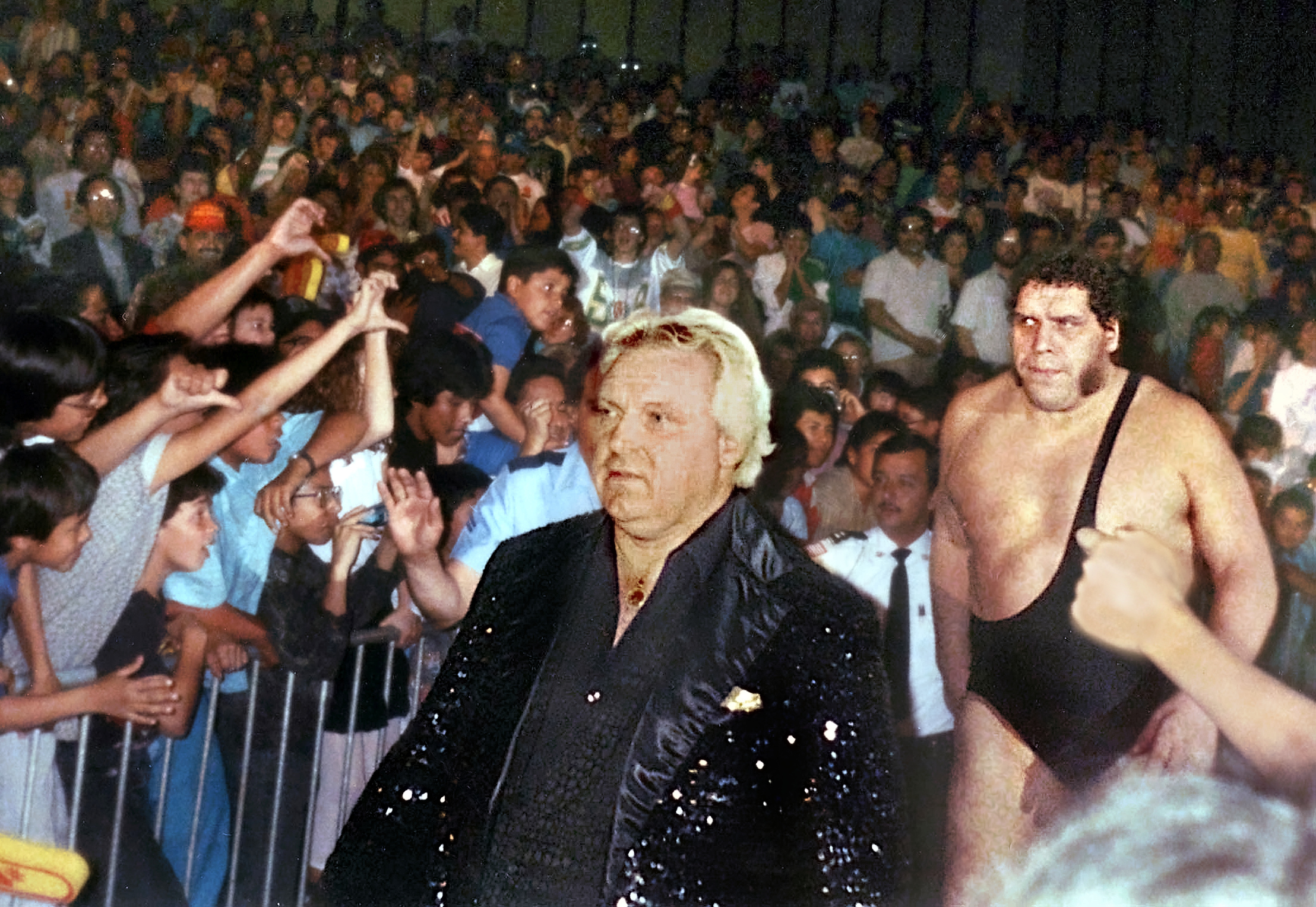
Heenan (left) managed many of the WWF's top stars, notably leading André the Giant (right) in 1989.

Heenan reformed the Heenan Family, which over the years in the WWF would include Studd, "Olympic Strong Man" Ken Patera, "Playboy" Buddy Rose, "Mr. Wonderful" Paul Orndorff, King Kong Bundy, André the Giant, High Chief Sivi Afi, the Brain Busters (former Four Horsemen members Arn Anderson and Tully Blanchard), "Ravishing" Rick Rude, "King" Harley Race, the Islanders (Haku and Tama), Hercules, The Barbarian, Mr. Perfect, The Red Rooster, and The Brooklyn Brawler. Heenan and the Heenan Family had a feud with Hulk Hogan in the 1980s, and Heenan managed two WrestleMania challengers to Hogan's title. In 1986, Heenan managed King Kong Bundy in his main event bout at WrestleMania 2. During the André the Giant–Hulk Hogan rivalry preceding WrestleMania III, André sided with Heenan and challenged Hogan at the event. While neither Bundy nor André won the title at that time, André later bested Hogan for the championship on The Main Event I on February 5, 1988, in a controversial win after he aligned himself with "The Million Dollar Man" Ted DiBiase.

After being derided by announcers for his first five years in the WWF (mostly by Gorilla Monsoon) for never managing a champion, WrestleMania V was promoted (mostly by Jesse Ventura and later Gorilla Monsoon) as Heenan's quest, and best chance since WrestleMania III to manage a champion. Heenan finally managed his first champion in the WWF when "Ravishing" Rick Rude upset Ultimate Warrior for the WWF Intercontinental Championship, a match Heenan ensured Rude would win by holding Warrior's leg down so he could not break the pin. Shortly thereafter, he led the Brain Busters to win the WWF World Tag Team Championship. After the Busters had lost the titles back to Demolition a few months later, he led the Colossal Connection (André and Haku) to win the Tag Team Championship when they defeated Demolition. Demolition would win the titles back at WrestleMania VI. Immediately after the loss, Heenan began blaming the loss on André the Giant going as far as slapping him. A few months after that, he led Mr. Perfect to Intercontinental Championship success.

Heenan also wrestled sporadically in his WWF run. In his in-ring debut at Madison Square Garden in November 1984, he cleanly pinned Salvatore Bellomo. Most of the matches he was in were tag team matches. At WrestleMania IV, he teamed with The Islanders to defeat The British Bulldogs and Koko B. Ware. The following year, he was defeated in 30 seconds by former client The Red Rooster at WrestleMania V. Heenan also wrestled a series of "Weasel Suit matches" against Ultimate Warrior, who defeated Heenan by forcing him into a weasel costume. His final in ring match came on August 2, 1991, at a house show in Long Island, New York, where he defeated Mr. Fuji.

Heenan retired from managing in 1991 to become a full-time commentator. Nonetheless, Heenan crossed the line to managing sporadically. When the WWF signed Ric Flair, Heenan spent several weeks talking Flair up as "The Real World's Heavyweight Champion", appearing onscreen with Flair's Big Gold Belt. He continued to act as an adviser to Flair during his WWF run from 1991 to 1993. Though he nominally managed Flair, Heenan's former protégé Mr. Perfect, who temporarily retired due to injury, would regularly accompany Flair to ringside as his "Executive Consultant". At the 1993 Royal Rumble, he introduced "The Narcissist" Lex Luger to the WWF to exact revenge on his former protégé, Mr. Perfect.

==== Commentator (1984–1993) ====
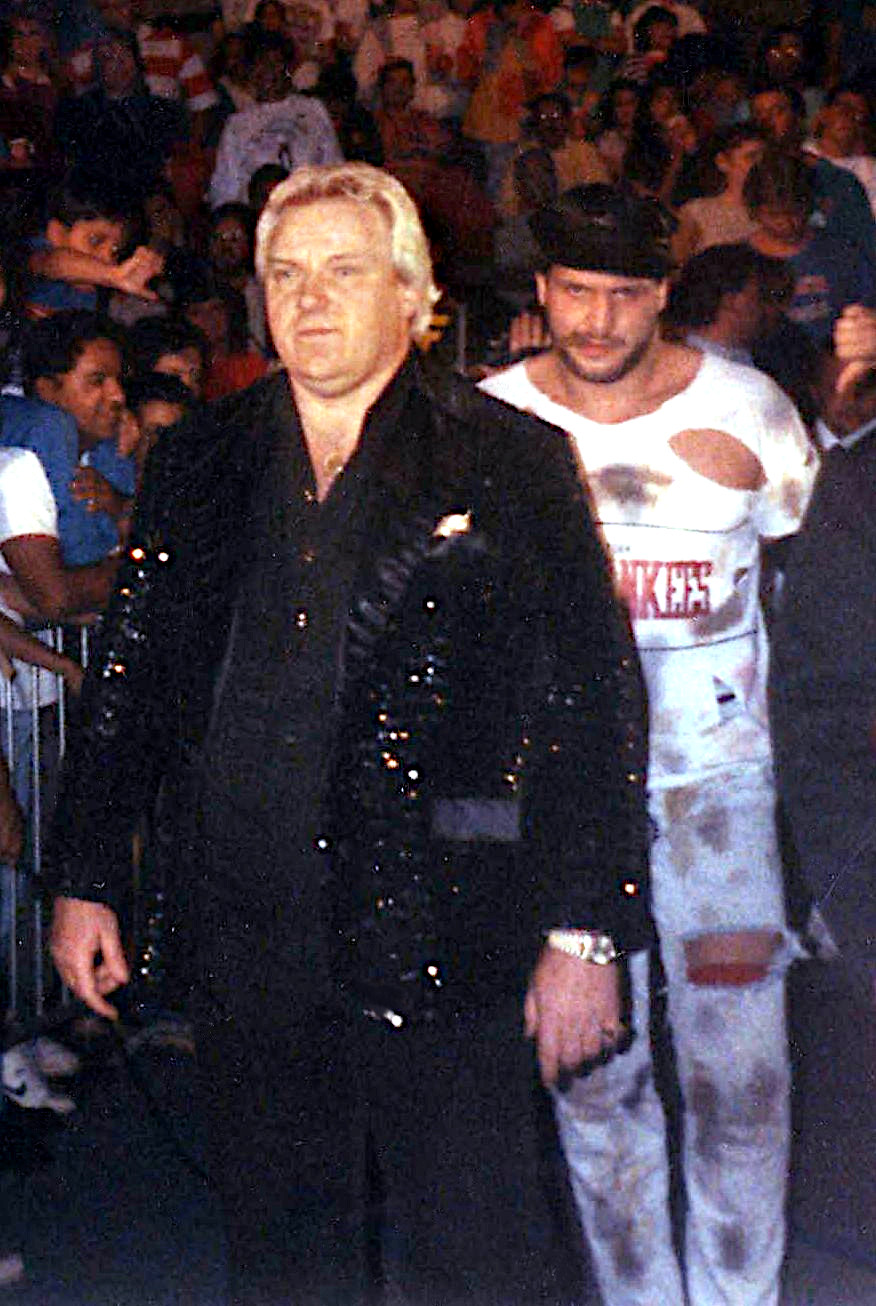
Heenan became a commentator while in the World Wrestling Federation, but continued to manage various wrestlers, such as The Brooklyn Brawler (behind Heenan) in 1989.

In 1984, WWF owner Vince McMahon took full advantage of his microphone and comedic skills and Heenan became a color commentator in addition to his managing duties. He replaced Jesse Ventura on Prime Time Wrestling and All American Wrestling, aired on the USA Network, teaming up with Gorilla Monsoon. He also replaced Ventura to team up with Monsoon on the syndicated All-Star Wrestling, which was replaced in the fall of 1986 with Wrestling Challenge. Although the purpose of these shows were to summarize weekly WWF events, viewers tuned in to see Heenan and Monsoon's interactions.

Heenan, calling himself a "broadcast journalist", bashed fan favorites and cheered for their opponents while they cheated or did something under-handed. For instance, Heenan claimed that Marty Jannetty was trying to escape Shawn Michaels' attack on the Barber Shop after Michaels threw him through a glass window. He referred to the fans as "humanoids", and fan favorites, especially enhancement talent, as "ham-and-eggers." Another moment between the pair often occurred when Heenan would go on a long rant supporting the villainous wrestlers, until an exasperated Monsoon would say either: "Will you stop?", "Give me a break!", or a sarcastic, "Please!"

In addition to his interactions with Monsoon, Heenan also did skits with fellow announcer Mean Gene Okerlund including two memorable moments when they played golf and tennis and also from late 1992 to September 1993, Okerlund and Heenan hosted All American Wrestling where they would visit various landmarks in America.

Heenan, still suffering from the broken neck he received ten years earlier and unable to cope with the long working hours, decided to leave the WWF at the end of 1993. He was given an on-air farewell by Gorilla Monsoon on the December 6, 1993 edition of Monday Night Raw, broadcast from the Westchester County Center in White Plains, New York. Fed up with Heenan's constant insults, Monsoon threw him and his belongings out of the arena and onto the street. After the show, Heenan stated that he and Monsoon embraced each other and wept for over an hour in the hotel where they both were staying.

Heenan's original plan was to retire, spend time with his family, and relax, but he was contacted by WCW soon after he left the WWF. He was unsure at first, but accepted their offer once he found out that WCW provided lighter work schedules and health insurance. Heenan also cited the short driving distance between WCW's home base of Atlanta and his daughter's school in Alabama.

=== World Championship Wrestling (1994–2000) ===
On January 27, 1994, Heenan made his debut in World Championship Wrestling (WCW). He was originally brought in to replace Jesse Ventura, his former client, as the color commentator for WCW Saturday Night and eventually took over Ventura's position as the company's lead commentator, replacing him for pay-per-view events and on the syndicated WCW Worldwide and Clash of the Champions events produced for TBS. When WCW Monday Nitro premiered in September 1995, Heenan left Saturday Night to work on the new show full-time and joined former Chicago Bears defensive lineman Steve McMichael as an analyst alongside play-by-play man Eric Bischoff. He was later frequently paired with Tony Schiavone.

On the January 23, 1996 episode of Clash of the Champions XXXII, during a match between Eddie Guerrero and Brian Pillman, Pillman left the ring and grabbed Heenan, who had a history of neck problems, by the collar, causing him to blurt out: "What the fuck are you doing?" live on the air. Five months later that year in June 1996, Heenan made a one-off return to ringside at The Great American Bash as the manager of two of his former clients, Ric Flair and Arn Anderson, in a tag team match against his broadcast colleague Steve McMichael and then Carolina Panthers linebacker Kevin Greene. Heenan was instrumental in convincing McMichael to turn on his partner, which enabled Flair and Anderson to win the match, and fill the open spot in The Four Horsemen that Brian Pillman left behind when he departed from the company earlier in the year.

At the following pay-per-view, Bash at the Beach, Heenan reacted incredulously when his old rival Hulk Hogan walked out during the main event match between The Outsiders (Kevin Nash and Scott Hall) and Sting, Lex Luger and Randy Savage by shouting "Whose side is he on?" Hogan subsequently turned his back on the fans and joined Hall and Nash to form the New World Order (nWo). Despite no longer being a fan favorite, Heenan continued to bash Hogan on commentary by gloating that he had been right about him all along, continuing a rivalry that dated back to their time in AWA.

Starting in late January 2000, WCW replaced Heenan on Monday Nitro and pay-per-view events with Mark Madden. Heenan continued to commentate on Thunder along with Mike Tenay, and later Schiavone, until he was replaced by Stevie Ray beginning in July 2000. Heenan was then only seen with Scott Hudson on Worldwide until he was released by WCW in November 2000. Heenan said he was uninspired in WCW due to the negative work environment and due to conflicts with Schiavone. WCW went out of business less than six months after his release.

=== Later career (2001–2009) ===
On April 1, 2001, Heenan returned to the WWF and provided commentary to the Gimmick Battle Royal match at WrestleMania X-Seven alongside "Mean" Gene Okerlund. Heenan was inducted into the WWE Hall of Fame class of 2004 (WWF changed its name to WWE in 2002) by Blackjack Lanza. The following night, he appeared at WrestleMania XX in a skit with Gene Okerlund, Mae Young and The Fabulous Moolah. He inducted his protégés Paul Orndorff, The Blackjacks and Nick Bockwinkel into the WWE Hall of Fame class of 2005, class of 2006 and class of 2007 respectively. In his last WWE appearance, he was one of the speakers for "Mr McMahon appreciation night" on the June 11, 2007 episode of Raw.

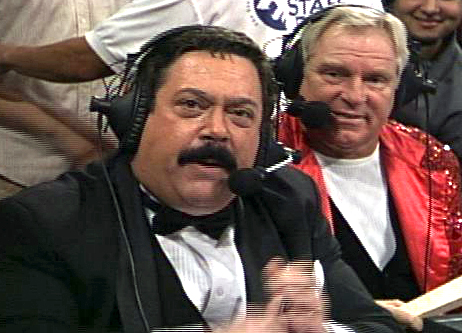
Heenan (right) with fellow WCW announcer Lee Marshall ringside at a WOW! Women of Wrestling event

Heenan made several appearances on the independent circuit. In February 2001, Heenan did color commentary for the WOW Unleashed pay-per-view. Also in 2001, Heenan worked briefly as a "sports agent" in the Xcitement Wrestling Federation with Curt Hennig under his tutelage. In 2004, he feuded with fellow manager Jim Cornette in Ring of Honor. Heenan made a series of appearances for Total Nonstop Action Wrestling (TNA) in December 2005, culminating at the Turning Point pay-per-view, where he provided commentary for the Six Man Tag Team Basebrawl match between The Diamonds in the Rough and Chris Sabin, Dale Torborg and Sonjay Dutt. His final appearance for TNA was on the September 7, 2006 episode of Impact!, when he appeared to make a bid to manage "free agent" Robert Roode. Pro Wrestling Report honored Heenan at the annual Blizzard Brawl event on December 5, 2009, in Milwaukee, Wisconsin, as he was given their Lifetime Achievement Award. In addition to this, the mayor of Milwaukee, Tom Barrett, declared December 5, 2009, to be "Bobby Heenan Day". Despite declining health in his final years, Heenan continued to make appearances at fan conventions. He enjoyed staying in touch with former colleagues and fans.

== Other media ==
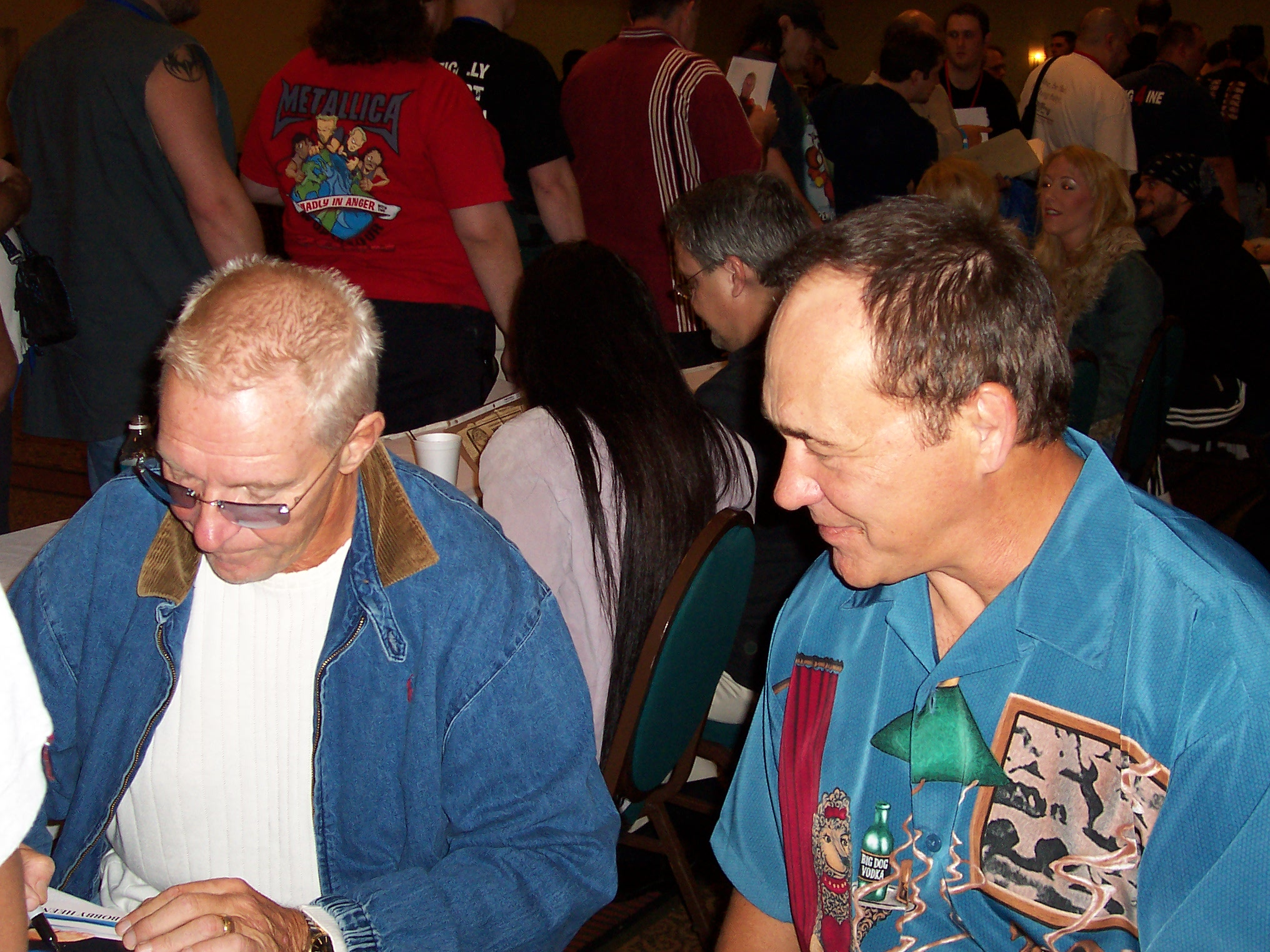
Heenan (left) and Larry Zbyszko in 2005

Heenan made appearances as a guest on various television shows, including: Family Feud, Live with Regis and Kathie Lee, The Jerry Lewis MDA Labor Day Telethon, Nickelodeon Kids' Choice Awards, The Arsenio Hall Show, and The Dennis Miller Show. He also made an appearance in the 1995 film Timemaster. Heenan had a parody talk show known as The Bobby Heenan Show, which was broadcast in four segments during the second half of WWF's regular weekly program Prime Time Wrestling.

In 1988, Heenan was named to Pro Football Hall of Fame Coach and Broadcaster John Madden's 'All-Madden Team' as the manager.

His first memoir, Bobby The Brain: Wrestling's Bad Boy Tells All, was released by Triumph Books on September 1, 2002, with a foreword from Hulk Hogan. A second memoir, Chair Shots and Other Obstacles: Winning Life's Wrestling Matches, was released by Sports Publishing on February 1, 2004, and has an introduction by Ric Flair. Both books were co-written by Steve Anderson.

In 2004, he joined former WCW commentators Tony Schiavone and Larry Zbyszko in providing commentary for the video game Showdown: Legends of Wrestling. After his Hall of Fame induction, Heenan provided comments for use in WWE documentary releases. In December 2010, WWE released a retrospective two-disc DVD on Heenan's career titled WWE: Bobby "The Brain" Heenan.

== Personal life ==
=== Family and friends ===
Heenan was married to Cynthia Jean Perrett (known as Cindy) from June 21, 1978, until his death. Together they had a daughter, Jessica. He also had two grandchildren.

Although on-screen they were often at odds, Heenan was actually very close with his WWF broadcast partner Gorilla Monsoon. He was also close friends with announcers Gene Okerlund and Mike Tenay. Various other people involved with the wrestling business, including Jim Ross, on-screen adversary Hulk Hogan and Ted DiBiase, noted their close friendships with Heenan on their Twitter accounts after he died.

=== Health and death ===
In January 2002, Heenan announced that he had throat cancer. By 2004, the cancer had gone into remission. The treatments caused a great deal of weight loss, dramatically altering his appearance and voice. In December 2007, Heenan had reconstructive surgery on his jaw, after the first surgery was unsuccessful. He was placed in a medically induced coma and was slowly brought out. In the second half of January 2008, he had come out of his medically induced coma. For a time, Heenan was unable to speak and had to communicate with his eyes. In December 2009, Heenan was hospitalized after an examination of his rebuilt jaw found an infection that needed to be treated. In the last few years of his life, he suffered a series of falls. In 2010, he broke a hip and his shoulder in a fall that also fractured his pelvis. He fell out of bed and broke a shoulder in April 2014. In May 2016, he fell again and broke a hip.

On September 17, 2017, Heenan died at the age of 72 while surrounded by family at his home in Largo, Florida. His cause of death was organ failure due to complications from the throat cancer that had been in remission since 2004.

== Legacy ==
Heenan is often described as the greatest wrestling manager of all time, including WWE, who placed him at the top of their 25 greatest managers list in 2011. The Post and Courier columnist Mike Mooneyham said Heenan became a blueprint for managers and fellow manager Jim Cornette said: "He formed in my mind as a fan and performer what I thought a manager should be." Author Brian Shields notes that many consider him "one of the most significant figures in professional wrestling history". For his work in promoting André the Giant's match with Hulk Hogan at WrestleMania III, often cited as the most famous American professional wrestling match, Heenan received a six-figure payoff—arguably the largest pay day in any managerial career. Broadcaster Peter Rosenberg considers Heenan a personal hero and describes him as the best commentator, manager and bad guy in WWE history. Rosenberg stated that Heenan "operated on multiple levels", adding: "If you were a little kid, he was the foil to your hero. As an adult, you look back and appreciate just how much of a comedic genius he was."

Longtime on-screen rival Hulk Hogan wrote in the foreword to Heenan's Bad Boy Tells All: "Bobby was a legendary wrestler ... He will go down in the books as someone who mastered the craft". These comments were echoed by Triple H, who said that Heenan was one of the best in-ring talents but chose to be a manager. Journalist Wade Keller states that what sets him apart from other managers was his ability to take "tremendous bumps" (falls to the mat after being attacked). Pro wrestling historian George Schire praised his in-ring ability, commenting: "Bobby was a good athlete – flipping over the ropes, he could do it all. And whether it was as the manager or as a wrestler, he could get the crowd going as well as anyone."

His comedic ability was praised by Dave Meltzer of the Wrestling Observer Newsletter, who wrote that Heenan could have been a successful television actor. Comedian David Letterman became a fan of Heenan after seeing him in WWA. WWE Hall of Fame commentator Jim Ross selected Heenan as the greatest talent in the history of the wrestling business. Ross praised Heenan's ability as a color commentator, stating:

He was naturally funny ... and enhanced every single talent, including the heroes, even though Bobby did not support the fan favorites as the bad guy announcer. [Heenan] did what every announcer should strive to do and that is to make talent bigger stars than they are and to embellish every talent's TV persona.

== Awards and accomplishments ==
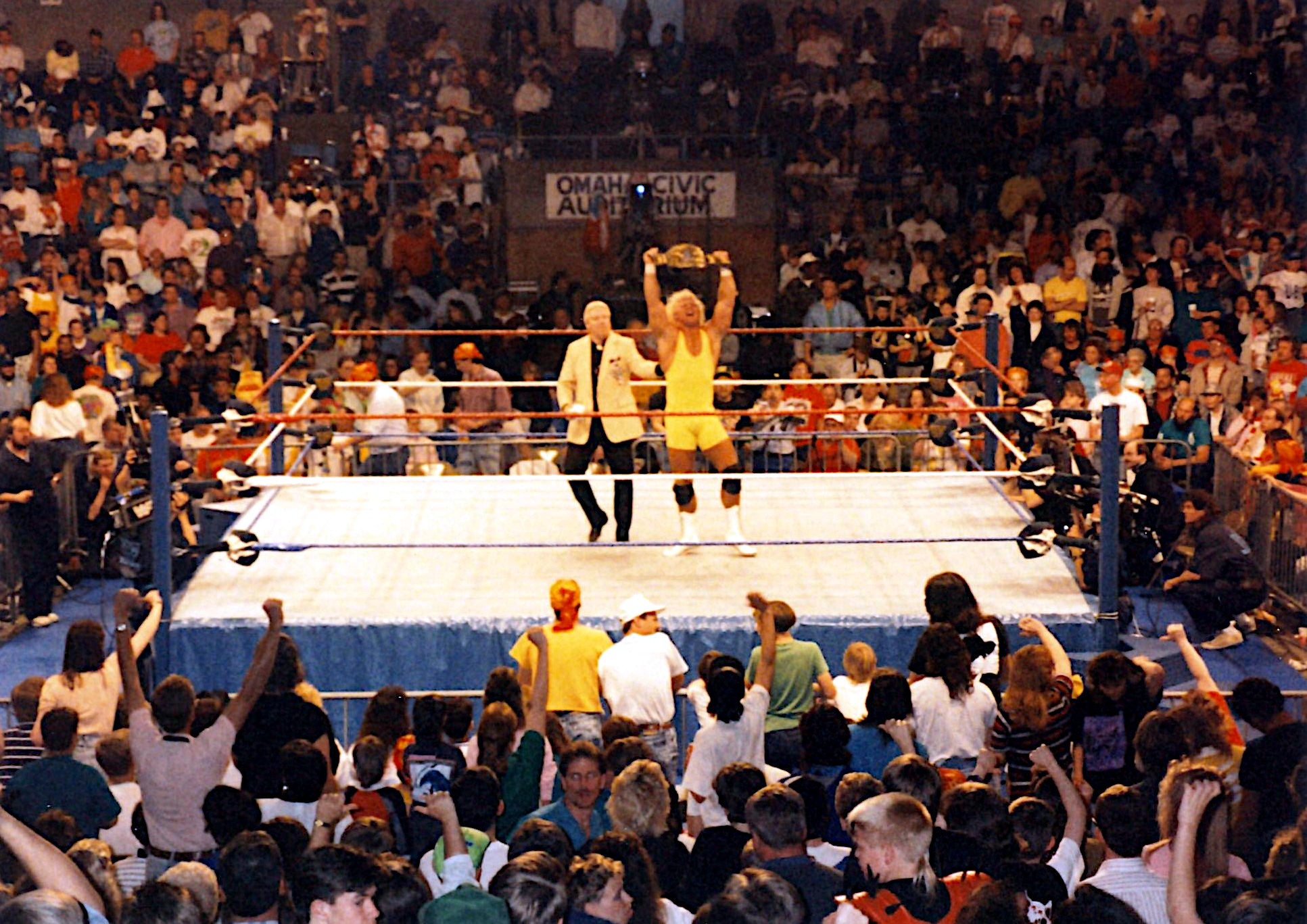
Many wrestlers managed by Heenan became champions, including Curt Hennig, who is pictured here with the WWF Intercontinental Championship.

- Cauliflower Alley Club
  - Iron Mike Mazurki Award (2004)
- Pro Wrestling Illustrated
  - Manager of the Year (1972, 1976, 1989, 1991)
  - Stanley Weston Award (2012)
- Pro Wrestling Report
  - Lifetime Achievement Award (2009)
- Professional Wrestling Hall of Fame and Museum
  - Class of 2006
- St. Louis Wrestling Hall of Fame
  - Class of 2010
- World Wrestling Entertainment
  - WWE Hall of Fame (Class of 2004)
- Wrestling Observer Newsletter
  - Best Color Commentator (1992–1994)
  - Wrestling Observer Newsletter Hall of Fame (Class of 1996)

== Bibliography ==
- Bobby Heenan with Steve Anderson. Bobby The Brain: Wrestling's Bad Boy Tells All. Triumph Books. 2002. ISBN 1-57243-465-1
- Bobby Heenan with Steve Anderson. Chair Shots and Other Obstacles: Winning Life's Wrestling Matches. Sports Publishing. 2004. ISBN 1-58261-762-7
