= André the Giant–Hulk Hogan rivalry =

Professional wrestling rivalry

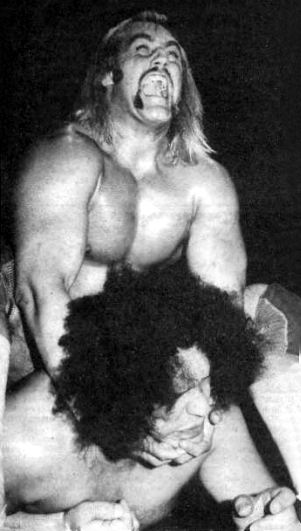
Hulk Hogan (top) and André the Giant (bottom) during the Superdome Showdown professional wrestling event on August 2, 1980, in New Orleans

The André the Giant–Hulk Hogan rivalry was a professional wrestling rivalry between wrestlers André the Giant and Hulk Hogan that took place in the World Wrestling Federation (WWF, now WWE).

The rivalry is considered by many to be one of the most important in professional wrestling history. (Note: The Hogan-André rivalry has been cited as one of the greatest of all time by WWE, Sportsnet, GameSpot, Slam! Sports, and The Outline.) Many describe their iconic bout at WrestleMania III - and the feud surrounding it - as the apex of the 1980s professional wrestling boom.

== History ==
=== Early matches (1978–1983) ===
Hogan, then wrestling as Terry Boulder, wrestled Andre five times in Southeastern Championship Wrestling - twice in 1978, and three times in 1979. Also on May 5, 1979, in Dothan, Alabama, the two had an arm wrestling match that ended in a no contest when Hogan overturned the table and his manager, Billy Spears, interfered.

Hogan joined the World Wrestling Federation in 1979, after two years of competing for smaller, regional promotions. Andre was, at the time, a six-year WWF veteran who also toured the regional circuit and Japan.

Their first WWF encounters came in the spring of 1980, when André competed as a face and Hogan as a heel. The two met 16 times throughout the year with André victorious in most of their matches; several matches, however, ended with both wrestlers being counted out. At Shea Stadium during Showdown at Shea, as well as a month later in Hamburg, Pennsylvania, Hogan body slammed André but ended up losing by pinfall, even though Hogan clearly kicked out before the three-count was made. During a television taping at Hamburg, Pennsylvania, Hogan and manager Fred Blassie confronted André as he was being interviewed and challenged him to a match, to which André accepted. During the match (aired the following week), Hogan again successfully body slammed André, but André gained the upper hand. Hogan then loaded his elbow pad with a pair of brass knuckles and struck him in the forehead, causing André to bleed; Hogan fled the ring before André yelled for him to come back. The two met several more times during 1980, with Hogan body slamming André in most of their matches before André would rally for a win, often by pinfall.

Throughout 1982 and 1983, while both men were working in New Japan Pro-Wrestling, the two had several additional matches; though during these matches, André was the heel and Hogan was the face.

=== 1982–1986: As friends ===
Hogan left the WWF in 1981 and, after filming scenes for the movie Rocky III, began competing for a rival company, the American Wrestling Association, or AWA, for which André also competed on occasion.

Bobby “The Brain” Heenan, a heel manager whose protégés included AWA World champion Nick Bockwinkel, immediately saw Hogan and Andre as threats to Bockwinkel's title and began targeting both of them. Hogan and André became allies, and from 1981 to 1983, often competed as tag team partners, facing Bockwinkel, Heenan and other members of the Heenan Family. The Hogan-André tag team won most of these matches, often by disqualification.

The friendship continued into 1984, when Hogan returned to the WWF. On the night that Hogan won the WWF World Heavyweight championship from the Iron Sheik, André was among the wrestlers who congratulated Hogan during a post-match celebration. The two teamed later in 1984 in a handicap match during an event at the Brendan Byrne Complex in East Rutherford, New Jersey, defeating Big John Studd and then-WWF Tag Team Champions Adrian Adonis and Dick Murdoch. Heenan joined the WWF in 1984 and again targeted Hogan and André. During the next two years, André and Hogan teamed against several Heenan family pairings, most notably Studd and King Kong Bundy (with Heenan joining them on occasion). As was the case in AWA, the Hogan-André team almost always came out the winners.

The friendship of Hogan and André played a crucial factor in the events leading up to their 1987-1988 feud.

=== Build to WrestleMania III (1987) ===
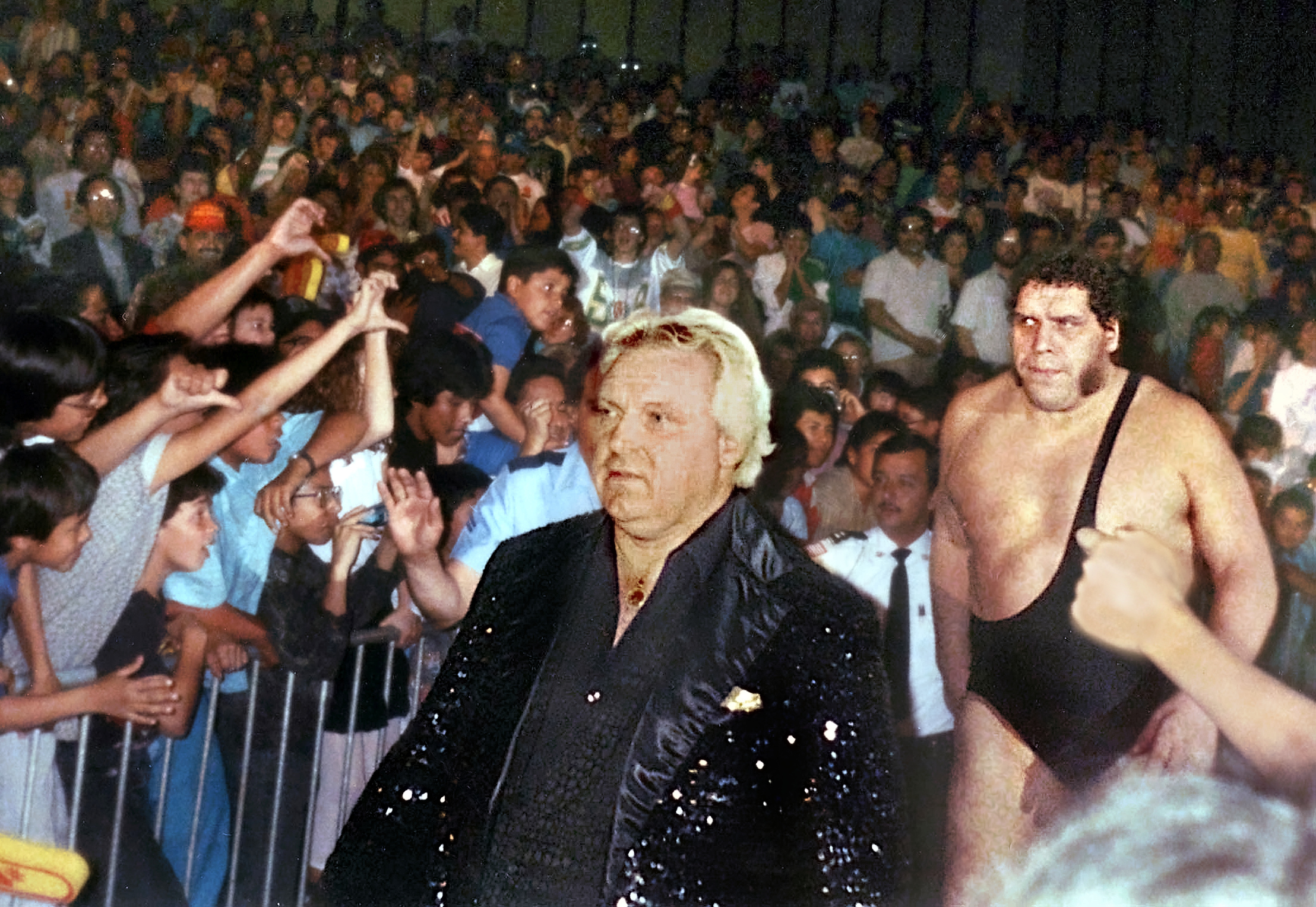
Bobby Heenan (left) managed André (right) during feud with Hogan (pictured March 1989).

After a leave of absence and a stint as competing as part of The Machines tag team stable, André returned to the WWF. The WWF began advertising André, once again as a face, as an opponent of either Randy "Macho Man" Savage, or as a tag-team partner of Hogan to face Savage and The Honky Tonk Man. However, Rick Steamboat competed instead in André's place, with no official explanation given for André's absence. André did make an appearance at a televised show at Madison Square Garden, getting into the ring after Hogan had won a match; André simply picked up the WWF World Heavyweight Championship belt, looked at it, and gave it back to a bewildered Hogan before leaving ringside. Announcers Gorilla Monsoon and Gene Okerlund thought André's unannounced appearance was strange, but didn't think anything more of it.

Things soon began to take shape on an edition of Piper's Pit in 1987. First, Hogan was presented a trophy for being the WWF World Heavyweight Champion for three years; André came out to congratulate him, but later Hogan remarked how André's handshake felt a little too firm. On the following week's Piper's Pit, André was presented a slightly smaller trophy for being "the only undefeated wrestler in wrestling history." WWF had billed André as having been undefeated for 15 years, despite having lost several matches via countout and disqualification. Hogan came out to congratulate André but spoke mostly of himself, causing André to walk out in the midst of Hogan's speech. A meeting between André and Hogan was then scheduled to take place the next week on Piper's Pit (February 7, 1987).

The following week, André came out and was accompanied by Bobby Heenan. Heenan accused Hogan of being André's friend only so he would not have to defend the WWF World Heavyweight Championship against him. Hogan disputed this, but André officially challenged Hogan to a match for the WWF World Heavyweight Championship at WrestleMania III. Heenan, following Hogan's apparent disbelief, stated "You can't believe it, maybe you'll believe this, Hogan!" followed by André ripping off Hogan's shirt and crucifix, with the crucifix causing Hogan's chest to bleed.

On a “Piper’s Pit” segment aired a week later, Hogan reflected on his friendship with André and how he felt betrayed now that André is with Heenan. After Hogan showed confliction as to whether or not he would accept André's challenge, Roddy Piper then asked Hogan point-blank whether or not he would face André at WrestleMania, to which Hogan responded with an emphatic “YES!” The friendship angle continued to be emphasized at a contract signing (aired several weeks later), where Hogan angrily accused André of betraying their friendship; Heenan pressed on with his claims that Hogan used their friendship to duck a title match, while André claimed he purposely held back on some of his teachings to Hogan before predicting victory.

During the March 14 (taped February 21) edition of Saturday Night's Main Event X at the Joe Louis Arena in Detroit, both men were participants in a 20-man Battle Royal. Although neither man won, André stated he gained a psychological advantage over Hogan, due to eliminating him from the contest. André also was billed as a corner man for several of Hogan's opponents, almost always members of the Heenan Family, at a few untelevised house shows prior to WrestleMania III.

At WrestleMania III, André was billed at 525 lb (238 kg), and the stress of such immense weight on his bones and joints resulted in constant pain, causing him to wear a back brace underneath his wrestling singlet. André had also undergone back surgery some months prior, further necessitating the brace. Hogan won the match after body-slamming André (later dubbed "the bodyslam heard around the world"), followed by Hogan's running leg drop finisher. This was billed as the first time Hogan slammed André, despite having done it multiple times in 1980. André had also been slammed previously by Harley Race, El Canek and Stan Hansen, among others.

Following the match, André took a leave of absence while Hogan concentrated on title defenses against Race, Hercules, Randy "Macho Man" Savage, the One Man Gang and Killer Khan, among others.

=== Feud continued (1987–1988) ===
In May 1987, on Saturday Night's Main Event XI, Heenan and André gave an interview with Gene Okerlund. During the interview, Heenan and André claimed – by virtue of a bodyslam attempt by Hogan about a minute into the match, wherein André fell on top and (by Heenan's claim) the referee completed the three count – they were cheated by the referee and that André was the rightful champion and therefore still undefeated. Heenan then demanded an investigation and a subsequent rematch if the WWF wouldn't strip Hogan of the championship.

At the inaugural Survivor Series event in November, André and Hogan were named as captains of their respective teams. After confronting each other in the ring early in the match, the two finally met midway through the match, battling for approximately one minute with Hogan dominating André; however, just as Hogan was about to knock André from the ring, heel wrestlers King Kong Bundy and the One Man Gang interfered from outside the ring and caused Hogan to be counted out. André went on to be the sole survivor of the match, pinning Bam Bam Bigelow. After the match, Hogan returned to the ring and attacked André, knocking him out of the ring.

Hogan then defended his title against Bundy on Saturday Night's Main Event XIII. André was in Bundy's corner and interfered in the match. The referee stopped the match and ejected André from ringside. André was irate, but obliged with the request in order to prevent Bundy from being disqualified. Bundy would go on to win the match via a count-out and demanded a rematch with André in his corner.

After Hogan won a rematch against Bundy on Saturday Night's Main Event XIV which aired January 2, 1988 (taped December 7, 1987), André snuck up to get revenge on Hogan, choking him from behind until he was virtually unconscious, not letting go even after seven face-aligned wrestlers came to the ring to try to pull André away; it was only after Hacksaw Jim Duggan broke a 2x4 over André's back (which Andre no-sold) that gave the faces the opening they needed to pull Hogan to safety.

In the meantime, Hogan was busy defending his title against the "Million Dollar Man" Ted DiBiase, which started when Hogan refused to sell the title to DiBiase. Hogan won every one of their matchups (often by disqualification), and a frustrated DiBiase turned to André to win the title for him. This, plus the Survivor Series match and André's attack of Hogan, were the pieces used to create interest in a Hogan-André rematch, set for The Main Event I, which aired live on February 5, 1988, on NBC. An in-ring contract signing was staged at the first Royal Rumble, aired January 24, 1988, where DiBiase promoted André to "give your stamp of approval" by grabbing Hogan, slamming his head into the table and then tipping the table on top of him before leaving the ring. The next evening, at a televised house show at Madison Square Garden, André was the cornerman for DiBiase and his bodyguard, Virgil, in the latter two wrestlers' tag-team match against Hogan and Bam Bam Bigelow; despite multiple times where André interfered, Hogan and Bigelow rallied for the win.

==== Hogan vs. André II (The Main Event) ====
At The Main Event, André won the match and WWF World Heavyweight Championship from Hogan, even though Hogan's shoulders were not on the mat during the entire three-count; the referee was distracted by Virgil during Hogan's pinfall attempt of André immediately before, setting up the finish. Immediately after winning, whilst still inside the ring and interviewed by Gene Okerlund, André publicly contractually surrendered the title to DiBiase, however the transaction was subsequently declared invalid by then-WWF president Jack Tunney and the title was declared vacant. The broadcast was seen by 33 million people, and to this day, is the most watched televised wrestling program in history.

Following the match, it was revealed that appointed referee Dave Hebner was "detained backstage", and Hogan, during his post match interview, accused DiBiase of paying someone to get plastic surgery to look like Dave. It was revealed to have been Dave's twin brother, Earl Hebner.

==== Hogan vs. André III (WrestleMania IV) ====
A 14-wrestler tournament was then set up for WrestleMania IV, for the winner to claim the vacant WWF World Championship; as part of the tournament, Hogan and André were given first-round byes and would automatically wrestle in the quarter-finals. In the meantime, Hogan and André battled on opposing sides of tag-team matchups, Hogan often paired with either Bigelow or Hacksaw Jim Duggan and André with DiBiase, with Hogan's team always victorious.

At WrestleMania, André and Hogan fought to a double disqualification in a WWF title tournament match. In the end, Hogan's friend "Macho Man" Randy Savage won the title, defeating DiBiase in the finals. The Hogan-André feud then simmered when Hogan took a leave of absence during the spring and early summer of 1988 (to film the movie No Holds Barred) while André feuded with Duggan.

==== Wind down of feud ====
Interest in a possible resumption of the feud came in the summer of 1988 when Savage began issuing an open challenge for the WWF World Championship, leading to a two-on-one attack by André and DiBiase. Savage recovered and the next week declared he and Hogan would face André and DiBiase at the inaugural SummerSlam pay-per-view held at Madison Square Garden in New York City.

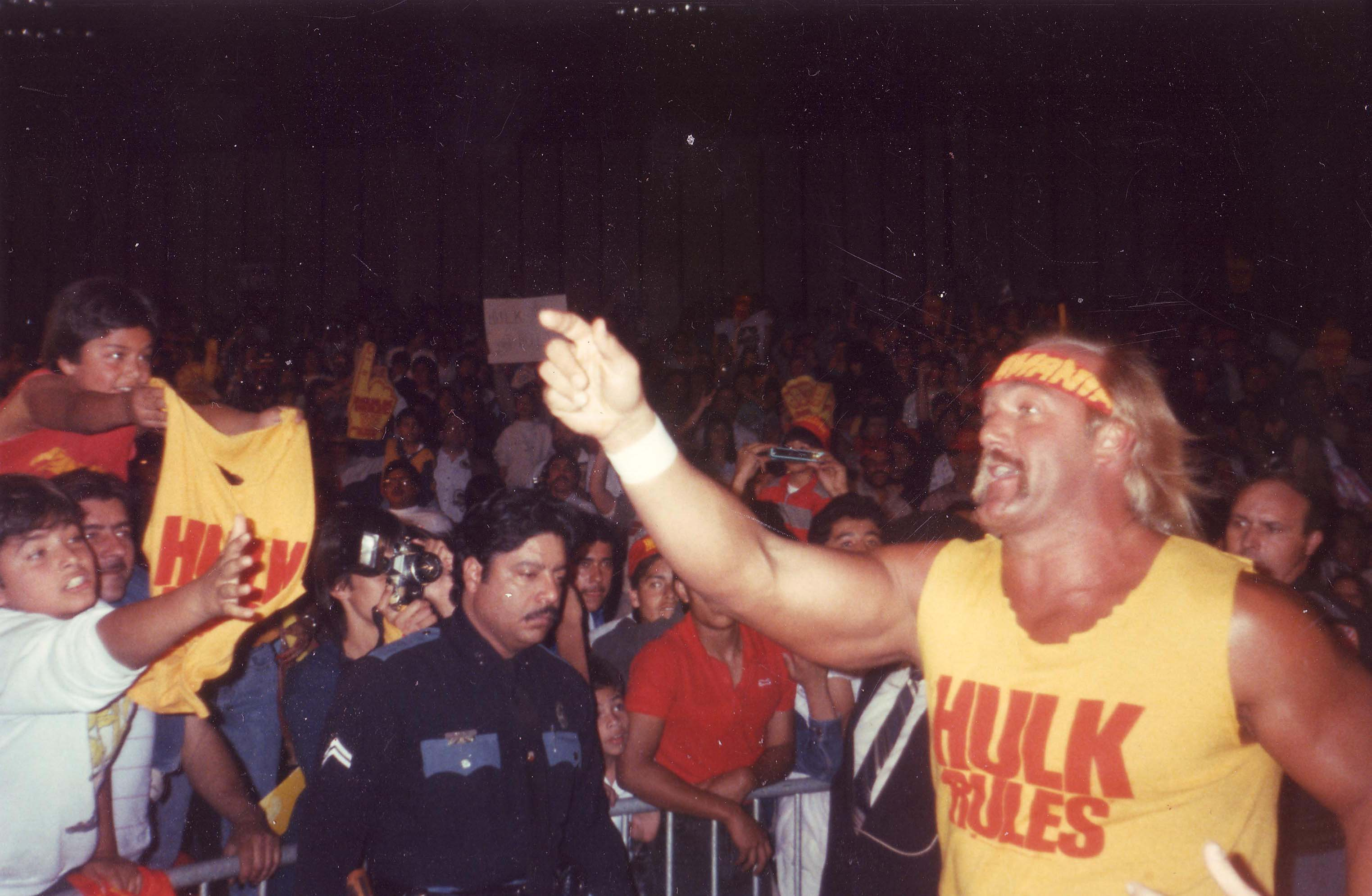
Hulk Hogan pictured in March 7, 1989, at the El Paso Civic Center for a WWF "Superstars of Wrestling" event. (He would fight Big Boss Man this night while André the Giant faced Jake "The Snake" Roberts.)

André and Hogan fought in a steel cage match held at WrestleFest on July 31, 1988, in Milwaukee, which Hogan won (after knocking André from the cage and causing him to be tied in the ring ropes). In the main event match at SummerSlam, André and DiBiase (calling themselves The Mega Bucks) seemed to have a psychological advantage over Hogan and Savage (known as The Mega Powers) as the heel-aligned Jesse "The Body" Ventura was the special guest referee. However, the Mega Powers won, thus ending the Andre-Hogan rivalry. André's next feud would be with Jake Roberts, and Hogan's would be (along with Savage) with the Big Boss Man and Akeem (The Twin Towers).

André and Hogan met one more time in their careers, that coming in March 1990, shortly before WrestleMania VI when Hogan teamed with the now-face Big Boss Man to defeat André and Haku (who were teaming as The Colossal Connection); the Colossal Connection were tag team champions, but this was a non-title match.

== Friendship ==
In real life, André and Hogan were friends, with Andre being invited to and attending Hogan's first wedding. Throughout the years, Hogan continued to praise André and even said in an interview that André was the one who laid the groundwork for other big stars. Despite André not liking Hogan at first, they became close friends. After André told Hogan to slam him at Wrestlemania 3, it helped make Hogan into a megastar. Hogan recalled McMahon being very excited after the event has ended, and André came up to Hogan and told Hogan that he, André, had always wanted to do that for Hogan. A program guide from Andre's 1993 funeral also later revealed that Hogan was even among the people who spoke at Andre's funeral.
