= Grand Ferré =

Popular hero from the Hundred Years War

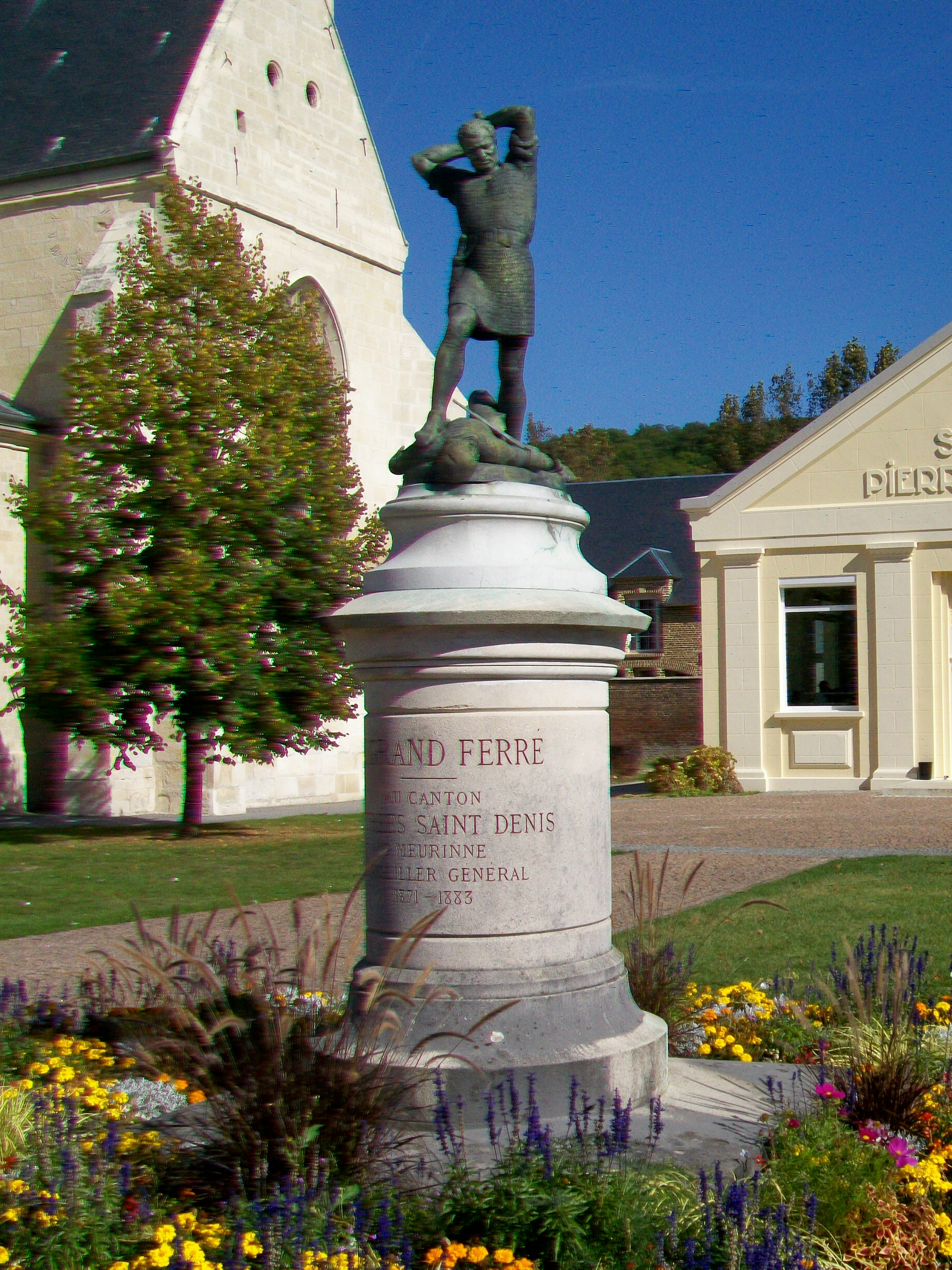
- Monument to Grand Ferré at Longueil-Sainte-Marie
- Born: c. 1330; Rivecourt, France
- Died: 1359

Grand Ferré (c. 1330-1359) was a French peasant from Rivecourt in the region of Picardy who took part in the Hundred Years War.

== Biography ==
Grand Ferré or the Great Ferrier (a blacksmith) was a peasant of large stature who distinguished himself alongside another peasant, Guillaume aux Alouettes who had been nominated as local captain during the Jacquerie of Beauvais, an uprising in May 1358, that started against local nobles but then turned on the invading English as well.

In 1359, he distinguished himself in the defence of the castle at Longueil-Sainte-Marie, which the English from neighbouring Creil had tried to capture. The chronicler Jean de Venette stated that Guillaume was mortally wounded when the English attacked the castle and Grande Ferré then single-handedly killed eighty-five opponents with an ax.

He contracted pneumonia after apparently drinking cold water and was taken to his cottage in Rivecourt to recover. The English thought they could surprise him whilst he slept, but when they arrived, he killed five of them with an ax while the others fled. He died soon after.

== Reception ==
A statue in honour of the Grand Ferré, by the sculptor Félix Martin, was erected in 1889 on the main square (now named Charles-de-Gaulle) of Longueil-Sainte-Marie (Oise).

André the Giant, a professional wrestler, was inspired by Grand Ferré and used the pseudonyms "Géant Ferré" and "Jean Ferré".

== Literature ==
In 2018, the journalist Éric Zemmour devoted a full chapter of his book, Destin Francais, to Grand Ferré, in his search for a national hero and took up a historiographical construction that dates from the 19th century. He introduces Ferré thus: “He is the ancestor of all the popular giants; the carcass as big as the heart; as strong as tender, as heroic as patriotic, as fierce as devoted; the unknown ancestor of all Quasimodo, of all Obelix. He is called "the Grand Ferré". He will embody the people, he will embody France.”
