= SummerSlam (1988) =

World Wrestling Federation pay-per-view event

- Promotional poster featuring the Mega Powers, the Mega Bucks, and Jesse Ventura
- Promotion: World Wrestling Federation
- Date: August 29, 1988
- City: Manhattan, New York
- Venue: Madison Square Garden
- Attendance: 20,000
- Tagline: Where the Mega Powers Meet the Mega Bucks

Pay-per-view chronology
← Previous; WrestleMania IV	Next → Survivor Series

SummerSlam chronology
← Previous; First	Next → 1989

The 1988 SummerSlam, also promoted as SummerSlam '88, was a professional wrestling pay-per-view (PPV) event produced by the World Wrestling Federation (WWF, renamed WWE in 2002). It was the inaugural SummerSlam and took place on Monday, August 29, 1988, from Madison Square Garden in the New York City borough of Manhattan, New York. The pay-per-view was created to help the company compete against rival promotion Jim Crockett Promotions. It was one of the first four annual pay-per-view events produced by the WWF, along with WrestleMania, Survivor Series, and Royal Rumble, later referred to as the "Big Four".

The event consisted of 10 professional wrestling matches. The preliminary matches included a title defense by WWF Intercontinental Champion The Honky Tonk Man against a surprise challenger, revealed to be Ultimate Warrior, who won the match in just 31 seconds to end Honky Tonk's 14-month title reign, which at the time was the longest Intercontinental Championship reign in history. The main event was a match pitting The Mega Powers (Hulk Hogan and Randy Savage) against their long-time rivals, The Mega Bucks (Ted DiBiase and André the Giant). Hogan and Savage won the match after Miss Elizabeth, Savage's manager, distracted André and DiBiase by removing her skirt to reveal her underwear.

== Production ==
=== Background ===
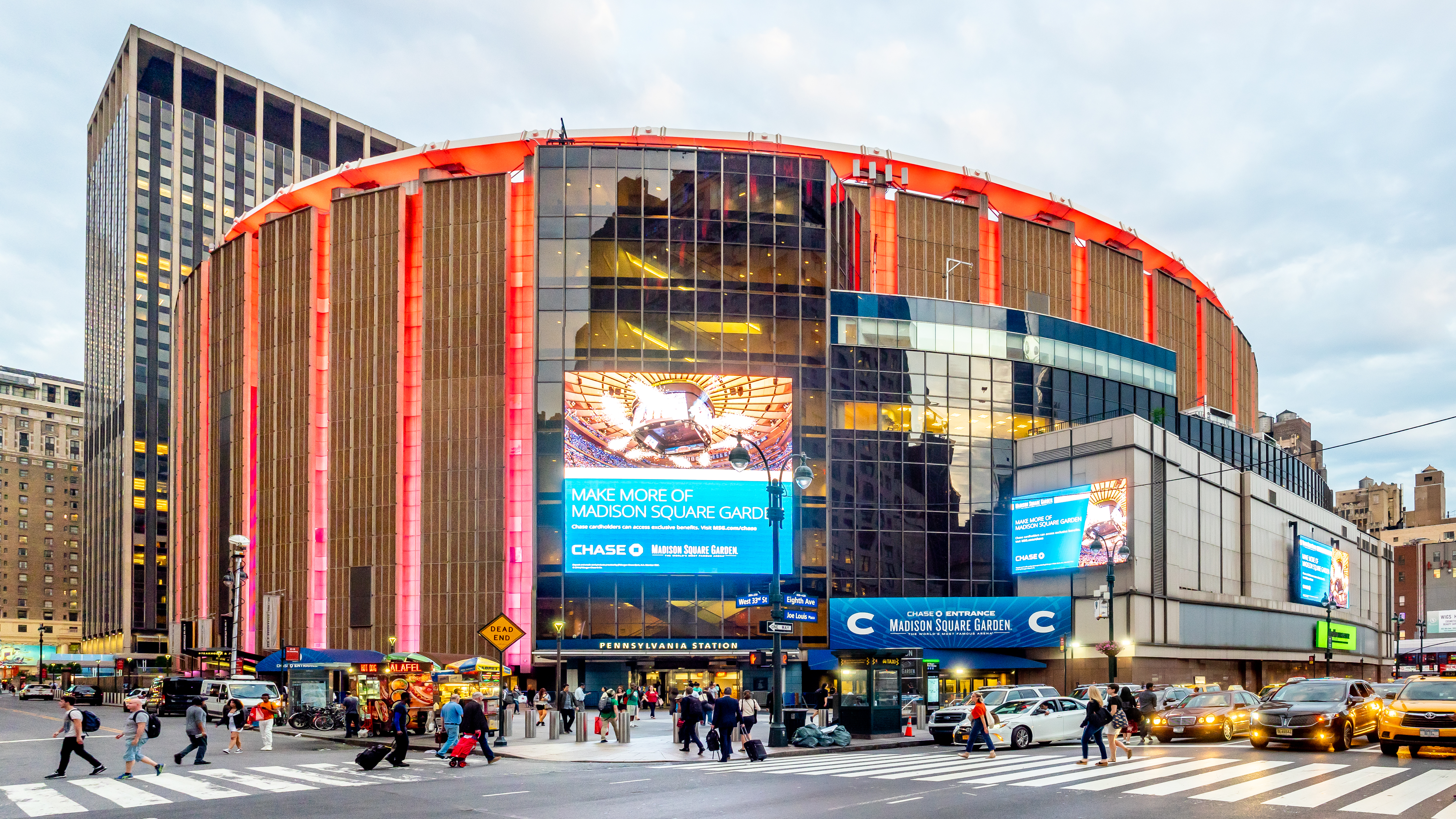
The inaugural SummerSlam was held at Madison Square Garden in the New York City borough of Manhattan, New York.

In the late 1980s, the World Wrestling Federation's (WWF, renamed WWE in 2002) main competition in the professional wrestling industry was from the National Wrestling Alliance's (NWA) Jim Crockett Promotions. WWF Chairman Vince McMahon countered Jim Crockett's successful Starrcade pay-per-view (PPV) event, which began airing in 1983, by creating WrestleMania in 1985. After WrestleMania III in March 1987, the most successful professional wrestling pay-per-view event in history at the time, McMahon created Survivor Series, which aired the same day as Starrcade in November 1987. After defeating Crockett in the ratings war, McMahon created the Royal Rumble, a free television special on the USA Network in January 1988, on the same night as the Crockett-produced PPV, Bunkhouse Stampede. The event set a ratings record for the network with eight million households tuning in to watch the event. In retaliation, Crockett created the Clash of the Champions I event, which aired simultaneously with WrestleMania IV. The latter garnered higher ratings, and not long after, Crockett filed for bankruptcy and sold his company to Ted Turner, who rebranded it as World Championship Wrestling (WCW).

As the WWF continued to replace its closed-circuit programming with pay-per-view programming, McMahon added more pay-per-views to the lineup to capitalize on the success of his previous events. In addition to WrestleMania in March, Royal Rumble in January, and Survivor Series in November, McMahon created an event for August, which he named SummerSlam. It was scheduled to be held on Monday, August 29, 1988, from Madison Square Garden in the New York City borough of Manhattan, New York. To keep the WWF from having a pay-per-view market monopoly, Turner began airing monthly WCW pay-per-views. As a result, both companies brought in hundreds of millions of dollars of revenue.

=== Storylines ===
Before SummerSlam, The Honky Tonk Man had been the longest reigning WWF Intercontinental Champion in history. He was originally supposed to defend his championship against Brutus Beefcake, but Beefcake was unable to compete as a result of an (storyline) injury received from Ron Bass the week before.

Also before the event, Demolition (Ax and Smash) held the WWF Tag Team Championship, which they had won at WrestleMania IV after only a year in the WWF; they would defend their title at SummerSlam against former champions The Hart Foundation (Bret Hart and Jim Neidhart), who had become fan favorites a few weeks earlier by turning on their manager Jimmy Hart.

The on-screen feud between Rick Rude and Jake Roberts began weeks before SummerSlam. As part of his gimmick, Rude would—after winning a match—invite a pre-selected woman from the audience to kiss him in the ring. On one occasion, one of the women refused to comply, later identifying herself as Roberts' wife, Cheryl. As the feud intensified, Rude began wearing a pair of tights with a picture of Cheryl stenciled on them, prompting a furious Roberts to charge into the ring and strip the tights off Rude, appearing to television viewers to leave Rude naked, although the live audience saw him stripped to a g-string instead.

For months before the pay-per-view, Hulk Hogan and undisputed WWF World Heavyweight Champion Randy Savage, two of the WWF's top crowd favorites, had feuded with André the Giant and Ted DiBiase, respectively. The two feuds first came together at WrestleMania IV, when—as the result of the vacating of the WWF World Heavyweight Championship—a 14-man single-elimination tournament was set up to crown a new champion. Hogan and André had been disqualified in their quarterfinal match, while Savage and DiBiase reached the championship match; in that final match, Savage defeated DiBiase with help from Hogan to win the vacant title. Savage and DiBiase feuded over the title throughout the spring and summer, but André did not become involved until mid-summer, when he and DiBiase helped instigate a 2-on-1 attack against Savage as he was delivering a promo. Savage quickly recovered and challenged André and DiBiase to a tag team match against him and a partner to be named. That partner was later revealed to be Hogan who returned after being off television for several months (Hogan was written off television after WrestleMania IV due to the birth of his daughter Brooke Hogan and to film No Holds Barred which was released a year later); the team became known as "The Mega Powers." The André and DiBiase team—which dubbed itself "The Mega Bucks"—retaliated by announcing the guest referee would be someone they declared to be fair and neutral: Jesse Ventura, a color commentator on the WWF's programs who favored the villains, though according to the main storyline, Ventura was chosen by WWF President Jack Tunney as the only person capable of handling such a match.

== Event ==
Other on-screen personnel
Role:	Name:
Commentator	Gorilla Monsoon
Commentator	Superstar Billy Graham
Commentator	Bobby Heenan (Dino Bravo vs Don Muraco)
Interviewer	Gene Okerlund
Interviewer	Sean Mooney
Ring announcer	Howard Finkel
Referee	Dave Hebner
Referee	Joey Marella
Referee	Tim White
Referee	Jesse Ventura (Main Event)

The event began with a match between The British Bulldogs (Davey Boy Smith and Dynamite Kid), and The Fabulous Rougeaus (Jacques and Raymond Rougeau). As soon as the bell rang to signify that the match had begun, Smith attacked Jacques. The two teams traded blows until The Rougeaus flipped Dynamite Kid over their heads so that he fell on his back to the mat. Dynamite Kid escaped another offensive maneuver before tagging in his partner, Smith, and The British Bulldogs performed a double-team maneuver on Jacques. Despite having the upper hand, The Bulldogs failed to pin Jacques in time, and the match ended in a twenty-minute time limit draw.

The next match was between Bad News Brown and Ken Patera. Before the bell rang, however, Brown attacked Patera, who retaliated by performing a clothesline from the corner. Patera then slipped both of his arms underneath Brown's armpits and locked his hands behind his neck, using a submission move known as a full nelson. At the end of the match, Brown defeated Patera by striking him in the back of the head with his finishing move, the Ghetto Blaster.

After the second match ended, Rick Rude and the Junkyard Dog made their way to the ring. Their match began as Rude attacked Junkyard Dog from behind, who retaliated by headbutting Rude several times. Subsequently, Rude climbed to the wrestling ring's top rope and pulled down his tights to reveal another pair of tights with a picture of Cheryl Roberts on them. As a result, Jake Roberts, Cheryl Roberts' husband, ran to the ring and attacked Rude, forcing the referee to disqualify the Junkyard Dog.

The next match was a tag team match between The Powers of Pain (The Barbarian and The Warlord), who were accompanied by their manager The Baron, and The Bolsheviks (Boris Zhukov and Nikolai Volkoff), who were accompanied by Slick. Immediately, The Powers of Pain chased The Bolsheviks from the ring. Slick, however, distracted The Powers of Pain long enough to give The Bolsheviks an advantage. Zhukov was then slammed to the mat back-first and headbutted from the top rope, which allowed The Barbarian to pin him.

The fifth match of the event was an Intercontinental Championship match between The Ultimate Warrior and the reigning champion, The Honky Tonk Man, who was accompanied by Jimmy Hart. Before the match, it had been announced that Honky's original challenger, Brutus Beefcake, was unable to wrestle due to being attacked the previous week on an episode of Superstars of Wrestling by Outlaw Ron Bass, who had raked his cowboy spurs repeatedly across Beefcake's forehead (television and even the PPV only showed the censored version of the attack). Before the match, the Honky Tonk Man refused to be informed about Beefcake's replacement, and immediately before the match, even grabbed ring announcer Howard Finkel's microphone and said: "Give me someone out here to wrestle, I don't care who it is". His challenge was answered by Ultimate Warrior. Warrior, who accidentally knocked Finkel to the floor when he rushed into the ring and hit the ropes, had the advantage from the beginning, attacking The Honky Tonk Man, who was still in his entrance attire. After body-slamming him to the mat and following it up with a clothesline, Warrior bounded to the ropes and landed stomach-first on The Honky Tonk Man using his signature move, the "Warrior Splash". Ultimate Warrior then pinned The Honky Tonk Man after only thirty-one seconds to win the title. The longest Intercontinental title reign in WWF history had ended with one of the shortest Intercontinental title matches in history. Honky's reign would be the longest Intercontinental Championship reign in WWE history until Gunther broke the record in September 2023.

The following contest was a re-match from WrestleMania IV between Dino Bravo and Don Muraco. Muraco, the crowd favorite, was in control for most of the match until Bravo's manager, Frenchy Martin distracted Muraco, allowing Bravo to use his side suplex and pin him for the win. The Rock had gone into the match without his manager Superstar Billy Graham, who could only look on helplessly from his position in the commentary booth alongside Gorilla Monsoon at the illegal antics of Bravo and Martin.

The seventh match of the night was for the WWF Tag Team Championship. Reigning champions Demolition (Ax and Smash), accompanied by both Mr. Fuji and Jimmy Hart, were challenged by The Hart Foundation (Bret Hart and Jim Neidhart). As soon as the bell sounded, The Hart Foundation attacked both members of Demolition. Their control was brief, as Demolition then gained the advantage over Neidhart. As Bret Hart was tagged into the match, Demolition got the advantage over him when he was whipped shoulder-first into the turnbuckle, breaking Mr. Fuji's cane that he had placed there when the referee wasn't looking. After a few minutes of Demolition working over Hart's shoulder, a frustrated Neidhart chased Jimmy Hart from ringside and returned to tag back into the match. When all four men began fighting inside the ring, Neidhart attacked Mr. Fuji, who was on the ring apron. At the end of the match, Bret Hart attempted a piledriver, but Ax hit him with a megaphone given to him by Jimmy Hart sneaking back to the ring. Smash then pinned Bret Hart for the win.

Miss Elizabeth celebrated the Mega Powers' win, after removing her skirt to show her panties to distract the Mega Bucks.

The next match was between the Big Boss Man, accompanied by Slick, and Koko B. Ware. With Slick as a distraction, the Big Boss Man took the early advantage in the match. After crushing Koko in between himself and the turnbuckle with a jumping Avalanche, Boss Man refused to pin him and finish the match. Instead, he attempted to climb to the top rope and land on Koko stomach-first but missed. The Bird Man then retaliated by performing several dropkicks and attempted a pin. Boss Man got his shoulder up to save himself from being pinned, and he slammed his opponent into the mat, allowing him to pin Koko for the win.

The second to last match of the night was between Jake Roberts and Hercules. When Roberts attempted to slam his opponent's head onto the mat with a DDT, Hercules was able to escape the maneuver and take control of the match. As Hercules attempted to slam Roberts to the mat, Roberts reversed the move into a DDT, enabling him to pin Hercules for the win.

The last match of the night was the main event between The Mega Powers (Hulk Hogan and Randy Savage), accompanied by Miss Elizabeth, and The Mega Bucks (Ted DiBiase and André the Giant), accompanied by André's manager, Bobby Heenan and DiBiase's bodyguard, Virgil. Jesse Ventura was the special guest referee. The Mega Powers took the early advantage over DiBiase. After Hogan attacked André the Giant, who was on the ring apron, The Mega Bucks were able to regain control. After a while, all four men began brawling, and André knocked The Mega Powers out of the ring. Subsequently, as part of the scripted ending to the match, Miss Elizabeth began arguing with Ventura, the referee and ripped off her skirt to reveal a one-piece swimsuit. While the Mega Bucks were distracted, Savage climbed to the top rope and dropped the Macho Elbow on DiBiase, followed by Hogan hitting the leg drop on DiBiase. As Hogan pinned DiBiase, Ventura, a villainous character aligned with The Mega Bucks (despite being a long-time on-air Savage fan and his former tag-team partner), began a slow three-count. As a result, Savage slammed Ventura's arm down for the third time, indicating that Hogan and Savage had won the match.

== Reception ==
The event was produced by the World Wrestling Federation (WWF), and took place on August 29, 1988, in New York City's Madison Square Garden. The pay-per-view had a 4.5 buyrate, which means that 4.5% of pay-per-view subscribers ordered the event.

The original plan for SummerSlam was to bring Ric Flair over from the National Wrestling Alliance (NWA) to the WWF. Vince McMahon, the owner of the WWF, wanted Flair to challenge Savage in the main event for the WWF Championship. Flair, however, felt obliged to the NWA, and did not leave the promotion for the WWF. Therefore, Hogan and Savage were paired together to end their feuds with their respective on-screen rivals. Flair would not join the WWF until 1991.

In WWE.com's 2007 list of the top ten SummerSlam moments in history, Ultimate Warrior's Intercontinental Championship title win was listed as number ten, while Miss Elizabeth's distraction during the main event was listed at number nine.

Calum Waddell, in Fighting Spirit Magazine, called Ultimate Warrior's win over the Honky Tonk Man "genuinely captivating," and he said the match between The British Bulldogs and The Fabulous Rougeaus was an "exciting battle". In contrast, he had a negative reaction to the main event match, citing it as "predictably one-dimensional" and "abysmal". Similarly, Adam Nedeff of 411Mania, called the tag team match between The British Bulldogs and The Rougeaus "a solid match", but stated that the "lack of a finish was a disappointment". Although he reviewed most of the matches negatively, he called the WWF World Tag Team Championship to match a "good match". Overall, he rated the event a 4.5 out of 10 and stated, "Without Warrior's big win and Elizabeth's surprise finish, this is a forgettable show". Scott Keith, writing for Scott's Blog of Doom, praised the World Wrestling Federation's tag team division but said it was "a crappy show otherwise".

== Aftermath ==
On October 16, 1988, Ted DiBiase defeated Randy Savage in the finals of the King of The Ring Tournament. The Mega Powers continued to team together after the event until a new storyline was developed where Randy Savage became jealous of Hulk Hogan paying attention to Miss Elizabeth, and as the WWF World Heavyweight Champion, felt slighted over his perceived lower billing in the Mega Powers' pecking order. Several key events were developed to foreshadow their burgeoning feud; these included Hogan asking Elizabeth to accompany him to televised matches, where he would act overly friendly with her, and accidentally eliminating Savage from the Royal Rumble in January 1989 by knocking him over the top rope and to the floor. The final falling out happened on The Main Event II, when Elizabeth received an on-screen injury during a tag team match. Savage, left alone in the ring while Hogan tended to Elizabeth, attacked Hogan backstage. This rivalry culminated in a match for Savage's WWF World Heavyweight Championship at WrestleMania V, where Hogan won the title by pinning Savage.

As WWF Intercontinental Champion, Ultimate Warrior began receiving more on-air time and more prominent matches. His feud with the Honky Tonk Man continued for several months until Warrior was placed in a new feud with Rick Rude in early 1989.

After retaining their title against The Hart Foundation, Demolition held the WWF Tag Team Championship for another 11 months, as part of a record-breaking 16-month reign as champions, before eventually losing the title to The Brain Busters (Tully Blanchard and Arn Anderson) on Saturday Night's Main Event XXII. During the midst of their title reign, despite being billed as villains, Demolition's popularity with fans continued to grow, and the tag team eventually was turned face 3 months after SummerSlam at the 1988 Survivor Series.

Several of the WWF's stars from the beginning of its national expansion in 1984 slowly began leaving the promotion over the next few months, including Ken Patera, Junkyard Dog, The British Bulldogs (particularly Dynamite Kid), and Don Muraco as the WWF began focusing on new talents such as Bad News Brown, Rick Rude, Ultimate Warrior, the Powers of Pain, and the Brain Busters (who would arrive in October 1988).

Later in 1988, The Big Boss Man would join forces with the One Man Gang (who by then; had changed his character to Akeem, hailing from "Deepest Darkest Africa") to form the tag team called "The Twin Towers".

The Bolsheviks began to fall down the tag team ranks, losing in feuds with the Powers of Pain and later with the newly arrived Bushwhackers and Rockers.

Following the inaugural 1988 event, SummerSlam became one of the WWF's most successful events, as well as one of the WWF's original four pay-per-views, along with WrestleMania, Survivor Series, and Royal Rumble, which were eventually referred to as the "Big Four". Those four events, along with King of the Ring introduced in 1993, were known as the "Classic Five" (or "Big Five") until 2002, as the King of the Ring PPV was discontinued after 2002. In August 2021, Money in the Bank joined the four to become part of the "Big Five". SummerSlam has also been referred to as "The Biggest Party of the Summer", and eventually became the promotion's second biggest event of the year behind WrestleMania. In May 2002, the WWF was renamed to World Wrestling Entertainment (WWE), and the "WWE" abbreviation became an orphaned initialism in April 2011. SummerSlam continued to be held in August every year, except for 2022, which was held in July. From 2025 onwards, SummerSlam is held as a two-night event.

== Home media and streaming ==
The event was released on VHS by Coliseum Video in the United States in 1988. It became the first WWF pay-per-view event to be released on home video in the United Kingdom, when it was released by Silver Vision in 1990. The home video cut of the event includes specially recorded segments, such as Gene Okerlund travelling to Madison Square Garden in heavy traffic.

It was re-released on DVD in the United Kingdom in August 2004 as part of Silver Vision's Tagged Classics range, and was paired with SummerSlam 1989. This DVD set was not released in the USA.

In 2014, the event was included on the WWE's streaming platform the WWE Network as part of its launch and remained on the service until the platform closed in 2026. As of October 2026, subscribers in multiple territories, including the US, Canada and the UK, can stream the event on Netflix, thanks to the WWE's ten-year agreement with the company.

== Results ==
No.	Results	Stipulations	Times
1	The British Bulldogs (Davey Boy Smith and Dynamite Kid) vs. The Fabulous Rougeaus (Jacques and Raymond) ended in a time limit draw	Tag team match	20:00
2	Bad News Brown defeated Ken Patera	Singles match	06:33
3	Rick Rude (with Bobby Heenan) defeated Junkyard Dog by disqualification	Singles match	06:18
4	The Powers of Pain (The Warlord and The Barbarian) (with The Baron) defeated The Bolsheviks (Nikolai Volkoff and Boris Zhukov) (with Slick)	Tag team match	05:27
5	Ultimate Warrior defeated The Honky Tonk Man (c) (with Jimmy Hart)	Singles match for the WWF Intercontinental Championship	00:31
6	Dino Bravo (with Frenchy Martin) defeated Don Muraco	Singles match	05:28
7	Demolition (Ax and Smash) (c) (with Mr. Fuji and Jimmy Hart) defeated The Hart Foundation (Bret Hart and Jim Neidhart)	Tag team match for the WWF Tag Team Championship	10:49
8	Big Boss Man (with Slick) defeated Koko B. Ware	Singles match	05:57
9	Jake Roberts defeated Hercules	Singles match	10:06
10	The Mega Powers (Hulk Hogan and Randy Savage) (with Miss Elizabeth) defeated The Mega Bucks (Ted DiBiase and André the Giant) (with Virgil and Bobby Heenan)	Tag team match with Jesse Ventura as special guest referee	14:43
(c) / – the champion(s) heading into the match
