= I Like to Hurt People =

Film

I Like to Hurt People is a 1985 wrestling documentary film directed by Donald G. Jackson.

== Synopsis ==
After aspirations to film a horror movie were dropped, a mockumentary cobbled together from ringside footage follows popular wrestlers of the eighties.

== Cast ==
- Abdullah the Butcher (as self)
- Andre the Giant (as self)
- Dusty Rhodes (as self)
- Ox Baker (as self)
- Heather Feather
