= The Machines (professional wrestling) =

American professional wrestling stable

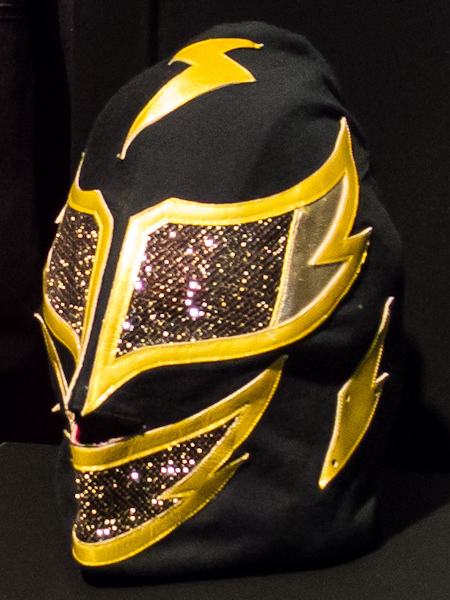
- The Machines mask

Stable
- Members: Super Machine; Big Machine; Giant Machine; Hulk Machine; Piper Machine; Animal Machine; Crusher Machine; Capt. Lou Albano (Manager)
- Billed from: "The Orient"
- Debut: August 1986
- Disbanded: October 1986
- Years active: 1986

The Machines were a professional wrestling stable who performed in the World Wrestling Federation in 1986. The team consisted of well-known WWF wrestlers working under masks which strongly resembled that worn by Super Strong Machine in New Japan Pro-Wrestling at the time; leader André the Giant had faced Hirata and two other Strong Machines during tours of NJPW in 1984, getting the idea for the masks. The gimmick was very much tongue-in-cheek, as the identities of the masked men were obvious to the fans but frustrating to heels when they were unable to prove them. The Machines was the last tag team Capt. Lou Albano managed in the WWF until he returned in 1994 to manage The Headshrinkers.

== Story ==
After feuding intensely with André for more than a year, Bobby Heenan's Heenan Family challenged André and a partner of his choice to face King Kong Bundy and Big John Studd in a tag team match on April 26, 1986. When André did not show and was replaced by Ted Arcidi, Bobby Heenan launched a campaign to get him suspended from the WWF. After deliberating on the matter, WWF President Jack Tunney was forced to suspend him for missing the tag team match and subsequent matches against the Heenan Family. This was part of a wrestling storyline, to allow André time off for production of the film The Princess Bride which was being filmed in the UK and also to allow him to fulfill a contracted tour of Japan. He was also beginning to develop health problems from the gigantism that caused his size that led him to having major back surgery and limited his wrestling ability at that time.

Less than two months after the suspension was announced, vignettes appeared on WWF television hailing the debut of a masked tag team from the Orient, known as "The Machines", Giant Machine and Super Machine. The team announced that they were coming to America soon with their manager Lou Albano and that their only mission was to prove that they were the number one tag team in the world. Super Machine was portrayed by Bill Eadie. His ring name was a play on his previous gimmick "Masked Superstar". Though it was clear that Giant Machine was none other than André the Giant, commentators sold that Giant Machine might be Giant Baba, and not André, under the mask.

In the following weeks, Heenan made repeated claims that Giant Machine was André the Giant attempting to circumvent his suspension. To illustrate the obviousness of the ruse, Heenan went so far as to introduce his "new team from Korea" on an episode of Jesse Ventura’s Body Shop. The team was merely King Kong Bundy and Big John Studd wearing paper bags over their heads. Heenan's claims led to Jack Tunney decreeing that if the Giant Machine was revealed to be André, André's suspension would become permanent.

On August 5 (shown August 23), The Machines made their WWF debut with Super Machine wrestling in a singles match while Albano and Giant Machine were at ringside. Later that night, Bobby Heenan snuck around at ringside taking pictures of the Giant Machine to try to prove his true identity. One week later, Albano introduced a third Machine to the WWF: Big Machine, who was played by Blackjack Mulligan. André had been suffering from (legitimate) severe back injuries, and the introduction of the Big Machine character was meant to reduce André's wrestling role. "The Machines" angle was designed to put him in a lighter tag-team role. Due to the severity of the back injury, Mulligan was brought in to reduce André's wrestling role even further, thereby keeping the popular superstar on TV. In televised interviews with Studd and Bundy, Studd would question the two smaller Machines being Japanese as one had a West Texas accent (Big Machine/Mulligan) and the other had a "New York accent" (Super Machine/Eadie). On the WWF show Tuesday Night Titans, Heenan claimed he knew of no Japanese wrestler who was 7'4" tall, weighed over 500 lbs and spoke with a French accent.

Big Machine and Super Machine wrestled the majority of the matches against Bobby Heenan's cronies, occasionally with Lou Albano joining them to face Bundy, Studd and Heenan in six man tag-team action. Soon, other masked wrestlers (whose identities were generally obvious) appeared and temporarily teamed with The Machines. On September 10, Big and Super Machine were joined by Animal Machine to defeat King Kong Bundy, Big John Studd and Bobby Heenan. On September 16, The Machines were joined by Hulk Machine as the trio defeated the Heenan Family. The Hulk Machine returned on September 22 and helped the Machines win in the main event at the Madison Square Garden. A few weeks later at the Boston Garden, the Machines received help from the kilt-wearing Piper Machine. On a house show in St. Paul, Minnesota the Machines even got the help of Crusher Machine, pinning John Studd to gain the victory for his team. On October 28, The Machines wrestled their last match under that gimmick, a loss to Bundy and Studd. This also marked the last appearance of Lou Albano as a manager in the WWF for several years.

After the Machines last match was shown on November 23, the angle was ended and André was announced as being reinstated on November 29. In the following weeks the mystery of why André the Giant was reinstated built up until it was revealed that Bobby Heenan had arranged for the suspension to end so he could turn on Hulk Hogan in the buildup to WrestleMania III. After the angle ended Eadie (Super Machine) was repackaged as Ax, one half of Demolition while Big Machine worked for the WWF as Blackjack Mulligan (Windham's best-known wrestling identity) in late 1986 and the first half of 1987 before leaving the promotion.
