= Rivecourt =

- Commune
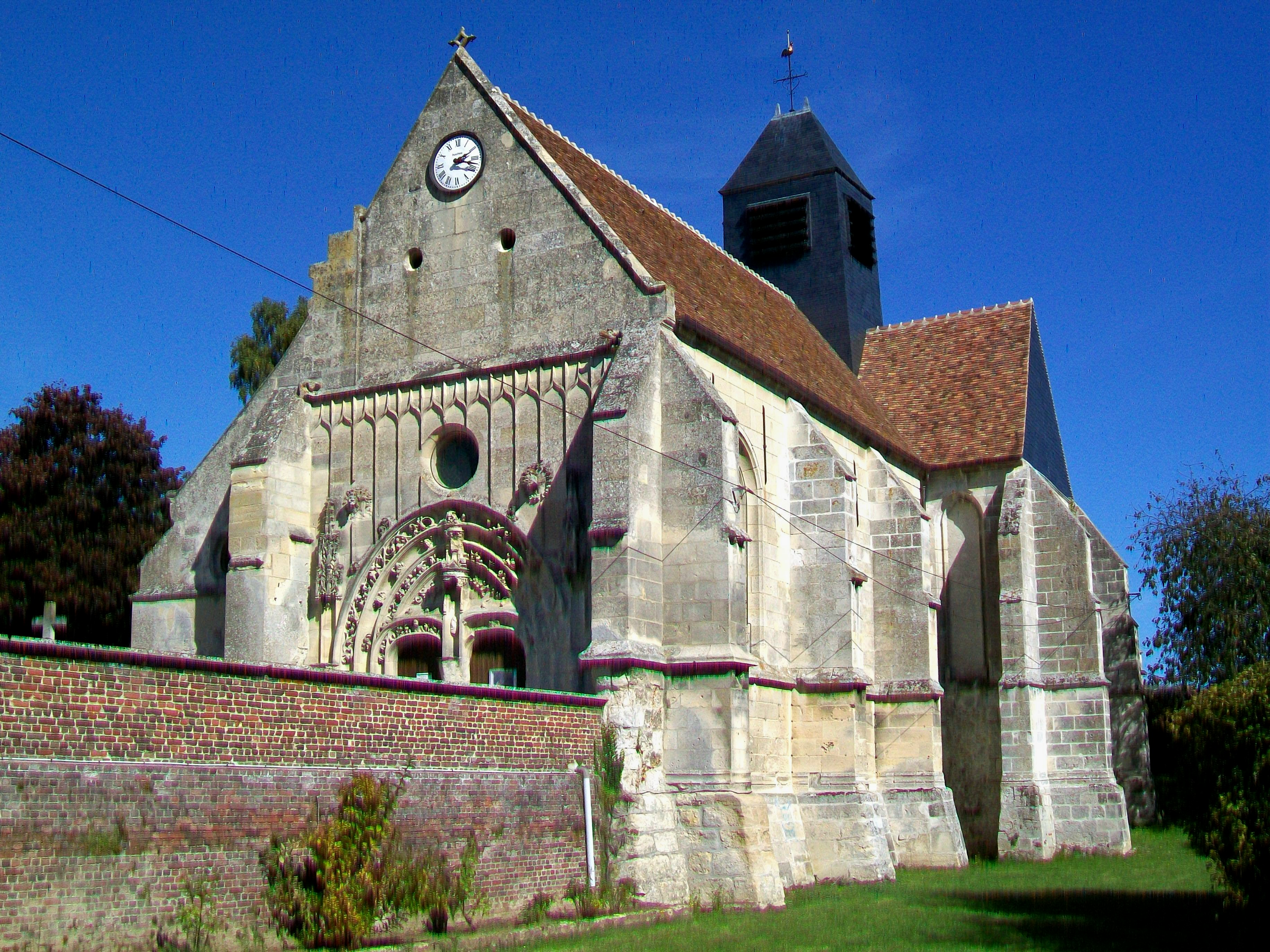
- The church in Rivecourt
- Location of Rivecourt
- Location within France Location within Hauts-de-France
- Coordinates: 49°20′55″N 2°44′08″E
- Country: France
- Region: Hauts-de-France
- Department: Oise
- Arrondissement: Compiègne
- Canton: Estrées-Saint-Denis
- Intercommunality: Plaine d'Estrées

Government
  - Mayor (2020–2026): Grégory Huchette
- Area^{1}: 3.87 km^{2} (1.49 sq mi)
- Highest elevation: 120 m (390 ft)
- Lowest elevation: 30 m (98 ft)
- Population (2023): 639
  - Density: 165/km^{2} (428/sq mi)
- Time zone: UTC+01:00 (CET)
  - Summer (DST): UTC+02:00 (CEST)
- INSEE/Postal code: 60540 /60126
- ^{1} French Land Register data, which excludes lakes, ponds, glaciers > 1 km^{2} (0.386 sq mi or 247 acres) and river estuaries.

Rivecourt (French pronunciation: [ʁivkuʁ]) is a commune in the Oise department in northern France.

== See also ==
- Communes of the Oise department
