= Mega Bucks =

Professional wrestling tag team

- The Mega Bucks, from left to right: Bobby Heenan, Virgil, Ted DiBiase and André the Giant

Tag team
- Members: Ted DiBiase; André the Giant; Virgil (manager); Bobby Heenan (manager)
- Billed heights: DiBiase: 6 ft 3 in (1.91 m); André: 7 ft 4 in (2.24 m) (as billed)
- Combined billed weight: 780 lb (350 kg)
- Debut: January 24, 1988
- Disbanded: August 29, 1988
- Years active: 1988

The Mega Bucks were a professional wrestling tag team who competed in the World Wrestling Federation (WWF) in 1988. The team, consisting of "The Million Dollar Man" Ted DiBiase and André the Giant, was formed in a storyline that saw DiBiase purchase André's contract from fellow manager Bobby Heenan. André was to win the WWF World Heavyweight Championship from Hulk Hogan, but then he attempted to sell the belt to DiBiase. The title was vacated, but DiBiase and André were then scheduled to face Hogan and Macho Man Randy Savage in a match at SummerSlam, which Hogan and Savage won. After the match, DiBiase and André went their separate ways and the team was dissolved.

== History ==
=== Formation ===
==== Prior to the "Mega Bucks" ====
André the Giant and Ted DiBiase had teamed on several occasions when both were signed to the World Wrestling Federation in 1979, when both worked as faces (or good guys). Their first documented teaming together was at an untelevised house show in Totowa, New Jersey, against two of the WWF's top villains of the time, "High Chief" Peter Maivia and Greg "the Hammer" Valentine; Andre and DiBiase won when Andre pinned Maivia. Andre and DiBiase wrestled WWF Tag Team Champions the Valiant Brothers (Johnny and Jerry) several times for the belts at untelevised house shows, with the Andre-DiBiase team usually winning by countout or disqualification (thus, never winning the belts). At least one Andre-DiBiase teaming was televised, this being a special series of shows taped at the Resorts International Steel Pier in Atlantic City, New Jersey. Andre and DiBiase would frequently team elsewhere through the years, including Japan and other smaller territory promotions, well before the Mega Bucks storyline; none of this was acknowledged by the WWF when DiBiase returned in 1987 under his "Million-Dollar Man"/"evil millionaire" gimmick and became involved in André's ongoing feud with Hulk Hogan.

==== André vs. Hogan; enter DiBiase ====
André and Hogan began feuding in early 1987 when, according to the storyline, André became tired of Hogan being the top wrestler in the WWF and was jealous of Hogan's reign as WWF World Heavyweight Champion and in believing that his own accomplishment of 15 years of never being defeated by pinfall was a more noteworthy accomplishment than Hogan's three years as champion, said it was not acknowledged to his satisfaction. On an episode of Piper's Pit, André turned on Hogan by taking on Bobby "The Brain" Heenan as his manager—Heenan, a mutual enemy of Hogan and André, had in storyline previously done all he could to destroy André—challenging him to a match for the championship and tearing his T-shirt off him. Hogan and André faced each other in the main event of WrestleMania III on March 29, 1987. Hogan won the match, but the feud remained unsettled.

In the summer of 1987, DiBiase returned to the WWF after a nearly eight-year absence and took on an "evil millionaire" gimmick. After several weeks of building heat for his character, DiBiase announced, during a live in-arena interview during a television taping that November, his intention to buy the WWF World Heavyweight Championship from reigning champion Hulk Hogan. Hogan refused and faced DiBiase in a series of matches instead. After DiBiase lost these matches, he purchased André's contract from Heenan in January 1988. He planned to help André win the title, after which André would present the belt to DiBiase as a gift. André and DiBiase had re-formed their alliance; unlike their previous association as faces, the two were heels seeking to destroy Hogan.

André faced Hogan for the title on the February 5, 1988 broadcast of The Main Event I, with Dave Hebner as the scheduled referee. André pinned Hogan to win the championship and handed the belt to DiBiase. The pinfall was controversial, however, as Hogan's shoulders were not on the mat when the referee made the three count. After the match, the real Dave Hebner, who looked identical to referee that had officiated the match, ran to the ring to attack the impostor referee. Hulk Hogan then threw the impostor out of the ring onto DiBiase and his bodyguard Virgil. According to the storyline, DiBiase had paid an unnamed referee to get plastic surgery to look exactly like Dave Hebner. In reality, the second referee was Dave's twin brother Earl Hebner, who was making his on-screen debut with the WWF.

Both prior to and after The Main Event match, André and DiBiase teamed several times against Hogan and (usually) Bam Bam Bigelow; on several occasions, Virgil, who was working as DiBiase's bodyguard, replaced André as DiBiase's tag team partner, although the Giant regularly appeared in DiBiase's corner. Hogan and Bigelow won every one of these matches.

=== Feud with The Mega Powers ===
The controversy surrounding the WWF World Heavyweight Championship title change and André's gifting it to DiBiase resulted in President Jack Tunney declaring the WWF World Heavyweight Championship vacant and booking a 14-man tournament at WrestleMania IV to determine the new champion. In the tournament, André and Hogan were booked to face each other. Their match ended in a double disqualification, and both men were eliminated from the tournament. Meanwhile, André interfered in DiBiase's matches, which helped DiBiase make it to the final match, in which he faced "Macho Man" Randy Savage. After André got involved to help DiBiase, Hogan came to the ring to even the odds. Savage won the match and the championship, and the rivalry led to a match being booked between The Mega Powers (Hogan and Savage) and The Mega Bucks (DiBiase and André). After WrestleMania IV, Andre returned to The Heenan Family, with the explanation that Heenan purchased his contract back at a profit, but his association with DiBiase continued.

The Mega Powers-Mega Bucks feud simmered during the next few months, as Hogan took a leave of absence from the WWF (to film No Holds Barred) and André was placed in a feud with "Hacksaw" Jim Duggan. DiBiase, meanwhile, became a top contender for Savage's WWF World Heavyweight Championship.

The feud returned to full boil following events at a television taping for WWF Superstars of Wrestling June 21, 1988, in Glens Falls, New York. There, during a podium interview with Craig DeGeorge, Savage—apparently victorious over DiBiase in their feud—threw out a request for future contenders when André (accompanied by Heenan) came out to challenge Savage for the World Heavyweight Championship, taunting him and making a choking motion. Before Savage could accept André's challenge, DiBiase ran into the arena sneak-attack Savage. Virgil grabbed Savage's valet, Miss Elizabeth, and forced her to watch as Savage was triple-teamed by DiBiase, Andre and Heenan. Savage quickly recovered and demanded a tag team match with a mystery partner against André and DiBiase, the match to be the main event of the inaugural SummerSlam; Savage's partner was later revealed to be the returning Hulk Hogan. With the Hogan-Savage team expected to use their "Mega Powers" name, DiBiase and André would team using the "Mega Bucks" name.

After weeks of exchanging taunts and each side predicting victory for their side, the two teams faced off at SummerSlam. Jesse Ventura had been appointed as a supposedly impartial guest referee by Jack Tunney. It was strongly hinted leading up the event that Ventura, who provided commentary for many WWF events and was a strong critic of Hulk Hogan but yet was a supporter of Randy Savage even (if only to a somewhat lesser extent) during his face days, had been paid an undisclosed amount by DiBiase. The Mega Powers took the early advantage over DiBiase, but after Hogan attacked André on the ring apron, the Mega Bucks were able to regain control. After several minutes and several advantage changes, all four began brawling, with DiBiase and André getting the upper hand and throwing both Hogan and Savage from the ring. At this point, Elizabeth jumped on the ring apron and began arguing with Ventura. With DiBiase and André pleading with Ventura to take drastic measures to get Elizabeth off the ring, she eventually tore off her skirt and threw it into DiBiase's face. In the ensuing chaos, Hogan and Savage recovered and mounted a comeback, which saw André knocked out of the ring and DiBiase take both the Mega Powers' finishing moves—Savage's flying elbow and Hogan's legdrop—before taking the pinfall loss. While counting the pinfall, Ventura stopped counting at two and hesitated until Savage pushed Ventura's hand to the mat to complete the three count.

=== Aftermath ===
This match marked the end of the feud between Hulk Hogan and André the Giant that had dominated WWF programming for over 18 months though the two would face off several more times In single matches that October. The two would face off for the last time in March 1990, just weeks prior to Wrestlemania VI when the then-WWF World Tag Team Champions The Colossal Connection Andre and Haku faced then-WWF World Champion Hulk Hogan and the Big Boss man at a house show. In the weeks after the match, André feuded with other upper-card wrestlers such as Savage and Jake Roberts. Hogan and Savage continued to feud with DiBiase for the remainder of the year before moving on to a new feud with the Twin Towers (Big Boss Man and Akeem).

Although the tag team of The Mega Bucks was short-lived, DiBiase and André appeared in the 1989 arcade game WWF Superstars as the game's boss tag team. Hints the two still were associated with each other came as late as WrestleMania V, when DiBiase interfered in André's match against Roberts.

== Championships and accomplishments ==
- World Wrestling Federation
  - WWF World Heavyweight Championship (1 time) – André
