= Longueil-Sainte-Marie =

- Commune
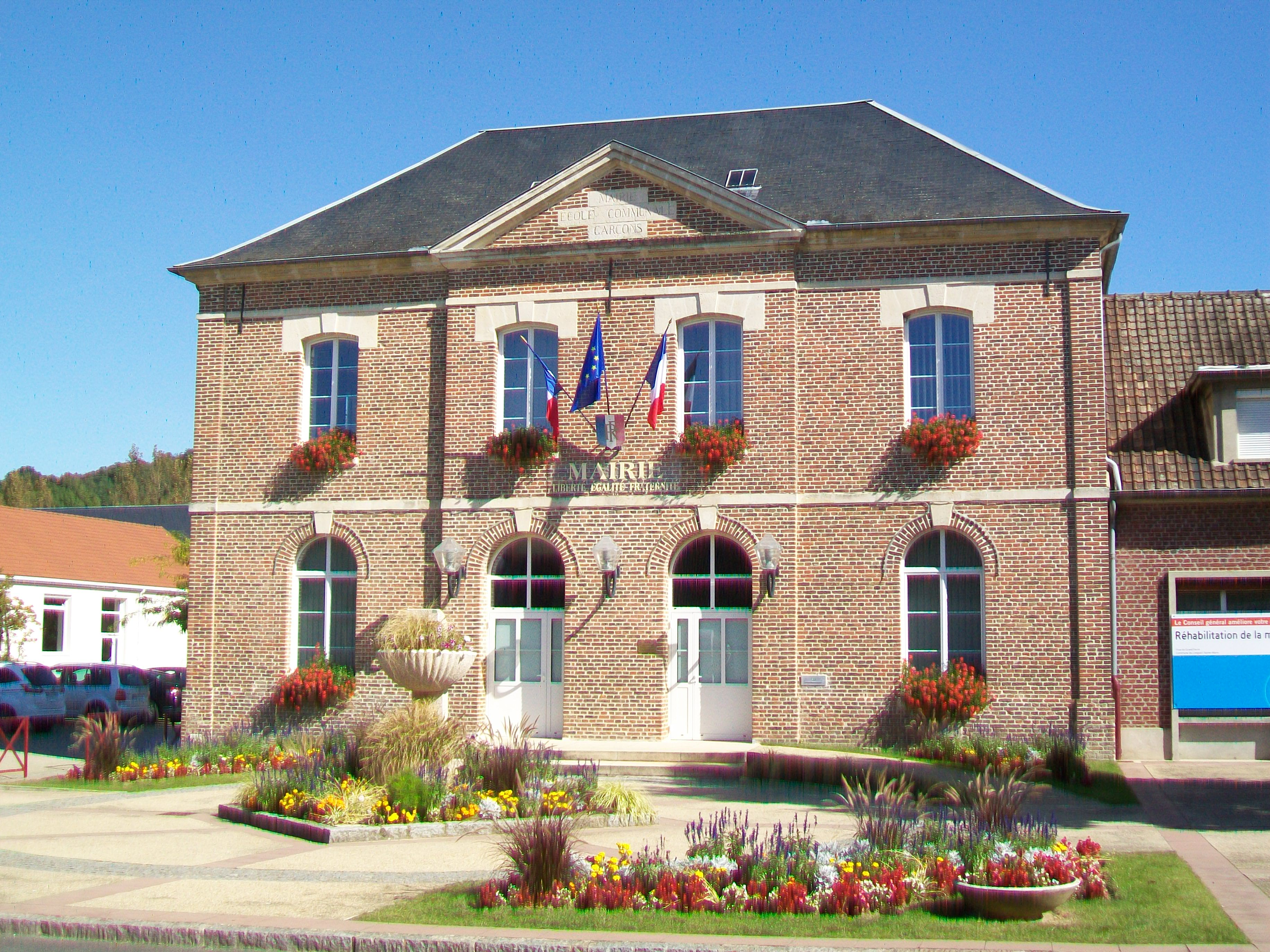
- The town hall in Longueil-Sainte-Marie
- Location of Longueil-Sainte-Marie
- Location within France Location within Hauts-de-France
- Coordinates: 49°21′27″N 2°43′07″E
- Country: France
- Region: Hauts-de-France
- Department: Oise
- Arrondissement: Compiègne
- Canton: Estrées-Saint-Denis
- Intercommunality: Plaine d'Estrées

Government
  - Mayor (2020–2026): Stanislas Barthelemy
- Area^{1}: 17 km^{2} (6.6 sq mi)
- Highest elevation: 129 m (423 ft)
- Lowest elevation: 28 m (92 ft)
- Population (2023): 1,895
  - Density: 110/km^{2} (290/sq mi)
- Time zone: UTC+01:00 (CET)
  - Summer (DST): UTC+02:00 (CEST)
- INSEE/Postal code: 60369 /60126
- ^{1} French Land Register data, which excludes lakes, ponds, glaciers > 1 km^{2} (0.386 sq mi or 247 acres) and river estuaries.

Longueil-Sainte-Marie (French pronunciation: [lɔ̃ɡœj sɛ̃t maʁi]) is a commune in the Oise department in northern France.

== Population ==
Historical population
Year	Pop.	±% p.a.
1968	1,014	—
1975	1,154	+1.86%
1982	1,173	+0.23%
1990	1,271	+1.01%
1999	1,445	+1.44%
2007	1,617	+1.42%
2012	1,855	+2.78%
2017	1,919	+0.68%
2023	1,895	−0.21%
Source: INSEE

== See also ==
- Communes of the Oise department
