= André the Giant =

French wrestler and actor (1946–1993)

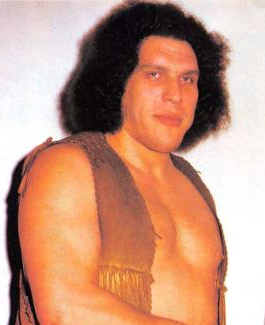
- André in 1972

Personal information
- Born: André René Roussimoff; 19 May 1946 Coulommiers, France
- Died: 28 January 1993 (aged 46) Paris, France
- Children: 1

Professional wrestling career
- Ring name(s): André Roussimoff; André the Giant; André the Giant Frenchman; The Ultimate Giant; Géant Ferré; Giant Machine; Jean Ferré; Monster Eiffel Tower; Monster Roussimoff; The Polish Giant
- Billed height: 7 ft 4 in (224 cm)
- Billed weight: 520 lb (236 kg)
- Billed from: "Grenoble in the French Alps"
- Trained by: Michel Saulnier
- Debut: 25 January 1966

André René Roussimoff (French: [ɑ̃dʁe ʁəne ʁusimɔf]; 19 May 1946 – 28 January 1993), known professionally as André the Giant, was a French professional wrestler and actor. Dubbed "the Eighth Wonder of the World", Roussimoff was known for his great size, which was a result of gigantism caused by excess human growth hormone.

Beginning his career in 1966, Roussimoff relocated to North America in 1971. From 1973 to the mid-1980s, Roussimoff was booked by World Wide Wrestling Federation (WWWF) promoter Vincent J. McMahon as a roving "special attraction" who wrestled for promotions throughout the United States, as well as in Japan for New Japan Pro-Wrestling. During the 1980s wrestling boom, Roussimoff became a mainstay of the WWWF (by then renamed the World Wrestling Federation), being paired with the villainous manager Bobby Heenan and feuding with Hulk Hogan. The two headlined WrestleMania III in 1987, and in 1988, he defeated Hogan to win the WWF World Heavyweight Championship, his sole major world heavyweight championship, on the first episode of The Main Event. As his WWF career wound down after WrestleMania VI in 1990, Roussimoff wrestled primarily for All Japan Pro-Wrestling, usually alongside Giant Baba, until his sudden death.

After his death in 1993, Roussimoff became the inaugural inductee into the newly created WWF Hall of Fame. He received a second induction when his WrestleMania III match with Hulk Hogan was inducted into the Immortal Moments category in 2026. He was also a charter member of the Wrestling Observer Newsletter Hall of Fame and the Professional Wrestling Hall of Fame; the latter describes him as being "one of the most recognizable figures in the world both as a professional wrestler and as a pop culture icon." Outside of wrestling, Roussimoff is best known for appearing as Fezzik, the giant in the 1987 film The Princess Bride.

== Early life ==
André René Roussimoff was born on 19 May 1946 in Coulommiers, Seine-et-Marne, to immigrants, Boris Roussimoff and Mariann Roussimoff Stoeff (née Marasjek); his father was Bulgarian and his mother was Polish. He was raised Catholic. He had two older siblings and two younger. His childhood nickname was Dédé (/ˈdeɪdeɪ/, French: [dede]). At birth, André weighed 13 lb (6 kg); as a child, he displayed symptoms of gigantism, and was noted as "a good head taller than other kids", with abnormally long hands. In a 1970s television interview, Roussimoff stated that his mother was 5 ft 2 in (157 cm) tall and his father 6 ft 2 in (188 cm) tall, and that according to his father his grandfather was 7 ft 8 in (234 cm) tall. By the time he was 12, Roussimoff stood 191 cm (6 ft 3 in).

Roussimoff was an average student, though good at mathematics. When he was 14, Rousimoff decided against further schooling and joined the workforce, believing what he learned was sufficient for a career as a farmhand. He did not drop out of school, as compulsory education laws in France were no longer applicable to those aged 14 or older.

Roussimoff spent years working on his father's farm in Molien, where, according to his brother Jacques, he could perform the work of three men. He also completed an apprenticeship in woodworking, and next worked in a factory that manufactured engines for hay balers. None of these brought him any satisfaction. While Roussimoff was growing up in the 1950s, the Irish playwright Samuel Beckett was one of several adults who sometimes drove local children to school, including Roussimoff and his siblings.

== Professional wrestling career ==
=== Early career (1964–1973) ===
At the age of 18, Roussimoff moved to Paris and was taught professional wrestling by a local promoter, Robert Lageat, who recognized the earning potential of Roussimoff's size. He trained at night and worked as a mover during the day to pay living expenses. Roussimoff was billed as "Géant Ferré", a name based on the Picardian folk hero Grand Ferré. This later became "Jean Ferre". Canadian promoter and wrestler Frank Valois met Roussimoff in 1966, years later to become his business manager and adviser.

Roussimoff began his career wrestling in his native France. He made his TV debut that year on French national television against Le Petit Prince. In 1968 he defeated Franz van Buyten for the FFCP World Heavyweight Championship In 1969 he appeared on the United Kingdom's World of Sport program's regular wrestling slot and defeated Jim Hussey, father of Mark Rocco. Roussimoff also began making a name for himself wrestling in Germany, Australia, New Zealand, and Africa.

He made his Japanese debut for the International Wrestling Enterprise in 1970, billed as "Monster Roussimoff". Wrestling as both a singles and tag team competitor, he quickly was made the IWA World Tag Team Champion alongside Michael Nador. During his time in Japan, doctors first informed Roussimoff that he suffered from acromegaly.

Roussimoff next moved to Montreal, Canada in 1971, where he became an immediate success, regularly selling out the Montreal Forum. Promoters eventually ran out of plausible opponents for him and, as the novelty of his size wore off, the gate receipts dwindled. Roussimoff was defeated by Adnan Al-Kaissie in Baghdad in 1971, and wrestled numerous times in 1971 for Verne Gagne's American Wrestling Association (AWA) as a special attraction.

=== Touring special attraction (1973–1984) ===
In 1973, Vincent J. McMahon, founder of the World Wide Wrestling Federation (WWWF), became Rousimoff's agent. McMahon suggested several changes to Roussimoff's booking and presentation to enhance his starpower. He felt Roussimoff should be portrayed as a large, immovable monster, and to enhance the perception of his size, McMahon discouraged Roussimoff from performing maneuvers such as dropkicks (although he was capable of performing such agile maneuvers before his health deteriorated in later life). He also began billing Roussimoff as "André the Giant" and set up a travel-intensive schedule, lending him to wrestling associations around the world, to keep him from becoming overexposed in any area. Promoters had to guarantee Roussimoff a certain amount of money as well as pay McMahon's WWF booking fee.

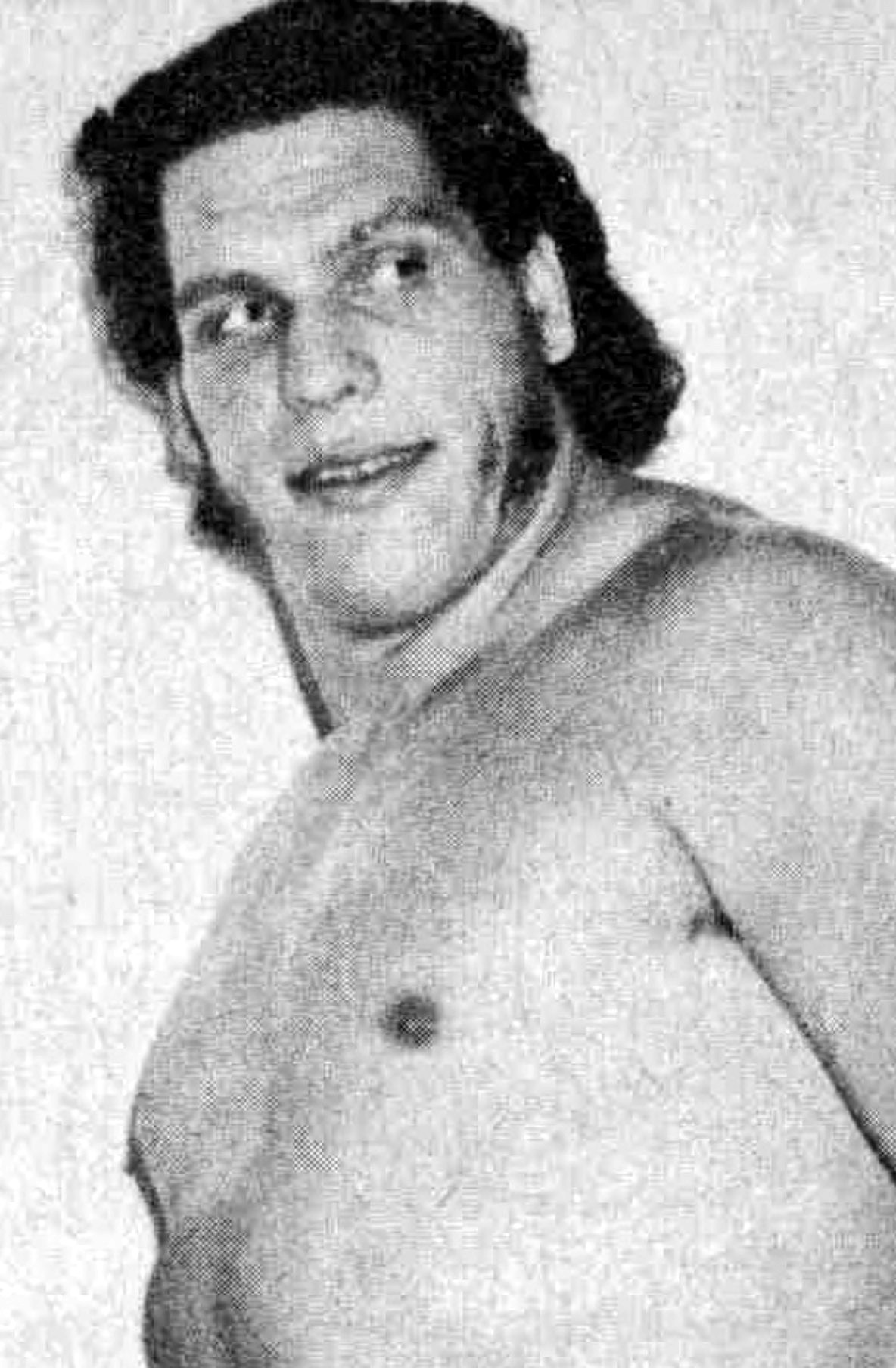
André the Giant, 1973

On 24 March 1973, Roussimoff debuted in the World Wide Wrestling Federation (later World Wrestling Federation) as a fan favorite, defeating Frank Valois and Bull Pometti in a handicap match in Philadelphia. Two days later he made his debut in New York's Madison Square Garden, defeating Buddy Wolfe.

Roussimoff was one of professional wrestling's most beloved babyfaces throughout the 1970s and early 1980s. As such, Gorilla Monsoon often stated that Roussimoff had not been defeated in 15 years by pinfall or submission prior to WrestleMania III. He had lost matches outside of the WWF: a loss to Adnan Al-Kaissie in Baghdad, Iraq in 1971, pinfall losses to Don Leo Jonathan in Montreal in 1972, Killer Kowalski in Quebec City in 1972 two draws and a countout loss to The Sheik in Toronto in 1974 after a fireball was thrown in Andre's face, knockout to Jerry Lawler in Memphis in 1975 and a count out to Lawler in Louisville in 1977, draw with Bobo Brazil at a battle royal in Detroit in 1976, Ronnie Garvin in Knoxville in 1978, Stan Hansen by disqualification in Japan in 1981, Kamala by countout in Toronto in 1984 and Canek in Mexico in 1984 and submission losses in Japan to Strong Kobayashi in 1972 and Antonio Inoki in 1986. He also had sixty-minute time-limit draws with two of the three major world champions of the day, Harley Race in Houston in 1979 and Nick Bockwinkel in Chicago in 1976.

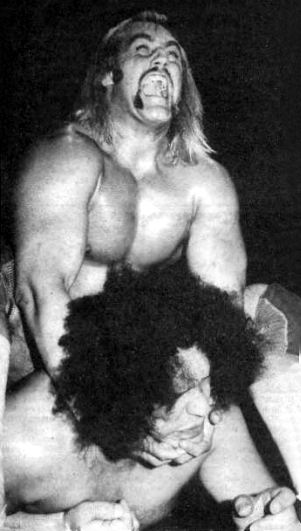
Hulk Hogan (top) and André the Giant during the Superdome Showdown professional wrestling event on 2 August 1980, in New Orleans

In 1976, at the second Showdown at Shea, Roussimoff fought professional boxer Chuck Wepner in an unscripted boxer-versus-wrestler fight. The wild fight was shown via telecast as part of the undercard of the Muhammad Ali versus Antonio Inoki fight and ended when he threw Wepner over the top rope and outside the ring and won via count-out.

In 1980, he feuded with Hulk Hogan, when, unlike their more famous matches in the late 1980s, Hogan was the villain and Roussimoff was the hero, wrestling him at Shea Stadium's third Showdown at Shea event and in Pennsylvania, where after Roussimoff pinned Hogan to win the match, Hogan bodyslammed him much like their legendary WrestleMania III match in 1987. The feud continued in Japan in 1982 and 1983 with their roles reversed and with Antonio Inoki also involved.

One of Roussimoff's feuds pitted him against the "Mongolian Giant" Killer Khan. According to the storyline, Khan snapped Roussimoff's ankle during a match on 2 May 1981 in Rochester, New York by leaping off the top rope and crashing down upon it with his knee-drop. In reality, he had broken his ankle getting out of bed the morning before the match. The injury and subsequent rehabilitation was worked into the existing Roussimoff/Khan storyline. After a stay at Beth Israel Hospital in Boston, Roussimoff returned with payback on his mind. The two battled on 20 July 1981, at Madison Square Garden in a match that resulted in a double disqualification. Their feud continued as fans filled arenas up and down the east coast to witness their matches. On 14 November 1981 at the Philadelphia Spectrum, he decisively defeated Khan in what was billed as a "Mongolian stretcher match", in which the loser must be taken to the dressing room on a stretcher. The same type of match was also held in Toronto. In early 1982 the two also fought in a series of matches in Japan with Arnold Skaaland in Roussimoff's corner.

=== World Wrestling Federation (1984–1991) ===
==== Feud with the Heenan Family (1984–1987) ====
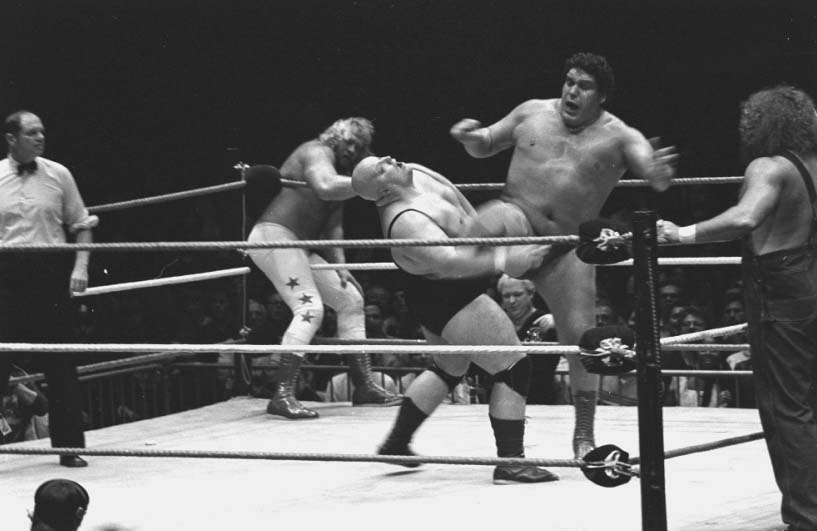
André the Giant and Hillbilly Jim versus King Kong Bundy and Big John Studd in tag team match at Madison Square Garden in October 1985

In 1982, Vincent J. McMahon sold the World Wide Wrestling Federation to his son, Vince McMahon As McMahon began to expand his newly acquired promotion to the national level, he required his wrestlers to appear exclusively for him. McMahon signed Roussimoff to these terms in 1984, although he still allowed him to work in Japan for New Japan Pro-Wrestling (NJPW).

Roussimoff feuded with Big John Studd over which of the two men was the "true giant" of wrestling. Throughout the early to mid-1980s, Roussimoff and Studd fought all over the world, battling to try to determine who the real giant of wrestling was. In 1984, Studd took the feud to a new level when he and partner Ken Patera knocked out Roussimoff during a televised tag-team match and proceeded to cut off his hair. After gaining revenge on Patera, Roussimoff met Studd in a "body slam challenge" at the first WrestleMania, held 31 March 1985, at Madison Square Garden in New York City. Roussimoff slammed Studd to win the match and collect the $15,000 prize, then proceeded to throw cash to the fans before having the bag taken from him by Studd's manager, Bobby "The Brain" Heenan.

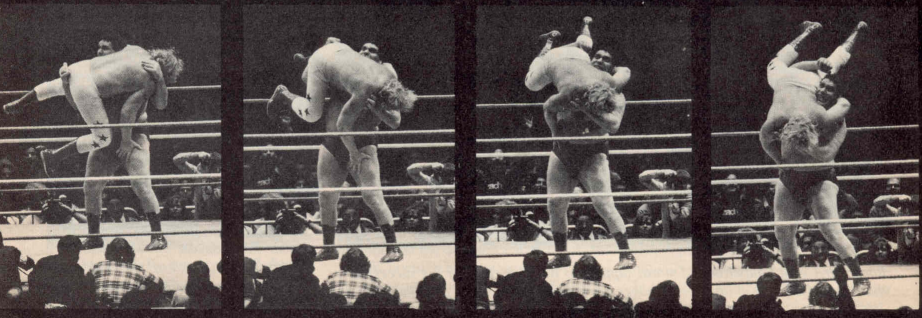
Roussimoff (bottom) bodyslams John Studd (top) at Wrestlemania I

At WrestleMania 2 on 7 April 1986, Roussimoff continued to display his dominance by winning a twenty-man battle royal which featured top National Football League stars and wrestlers. He last eliminated Bret Hart to win the contest. Following a final tour with New Japan Pro-Wrestling in mid-1986, and a win in Austria over CWA World champion Otto Wanz, Roussimoff began appearing exclusively with the World Wrestling Federation.

After WrestleMania 2, Roussimoff continued his feud with Studd and King Kong Bundy. Around this time, Roussimoff requested a leave of absence to tend to his health, since the effects from his acromegaly were beginning to take their toll, as well as to tour Japan. He had also been cast in the film The Princess Bride. To explain his absence, a storyline was developed in which Heenan—suggesting that Roussimoff was secretly afraid of Studd and Bundy, whom Heenan bragged were unbeatable—challenged Roussimoff and a partner of his choosing to wrestle Studd and Bundy in a televised tag-team match. When Roussimoff failed to show, WWF president Jack Tunney indefinitely suspended him.

Later in the summer of 1986, upon Roussimoff's return to the United States, he began wearing a mask and competing as the "Giant Machine" in a stable known as the Machines. Big Machine and Super Machine were the other members; Hulk Hogan (as "Hulk Machine") and Roddy Piper (as "Piper Machine") were also one-time members. The WWF's television announcers sold the Machines—a gimmick that was copied from the New Japan Pro-Wrestling character "Super Strong Machine", played by Japanese wrestler Junji Hirata, —as "a new tag-team from Japan" and claimed not to know the identities of the wrestlers, even though it was obvious to fans that it was Roussimoff competing as the Giant Machine. Heenan, Studd, and Bundy complained to Tunney, who eventually told Heenan that if it could be proven that Roussimoff and the Giant Machine were the same person, Roussimoff would be fired. Roussimoff thwarted Heenan, Studd, and Bundy at every turn. Then, in late 1986, the Giant Machine "disappeared" and Roussimoff was reinstated. Foreshadowing Roussimoff's heel turn, Heenan expressed his approval of the reinstatement but did not explain why.

==== Alliance with Bobby Heenan and Ted DiBiase (1987–1989) ====
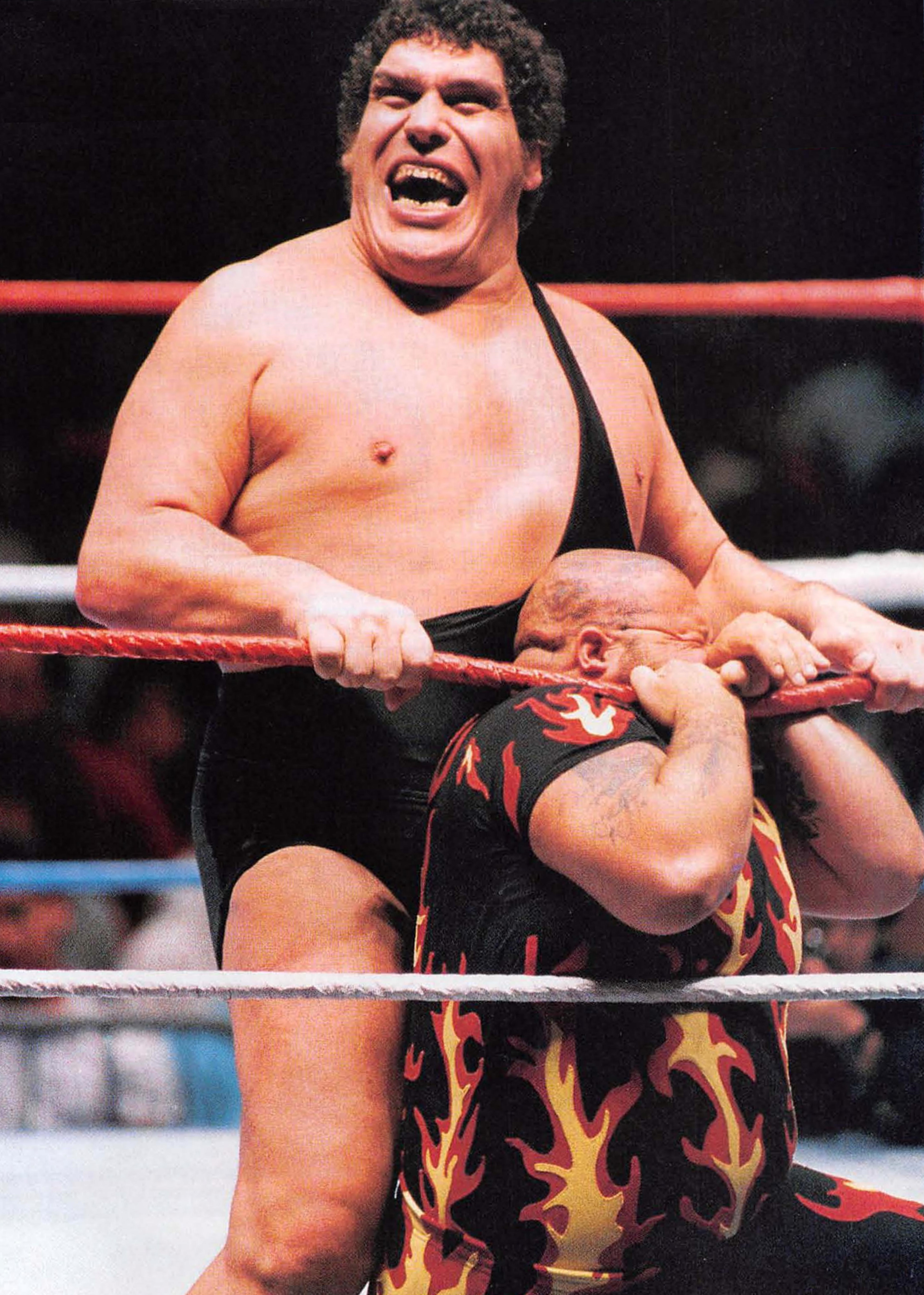
André wrestling Bam Bam Bigelow in 1988

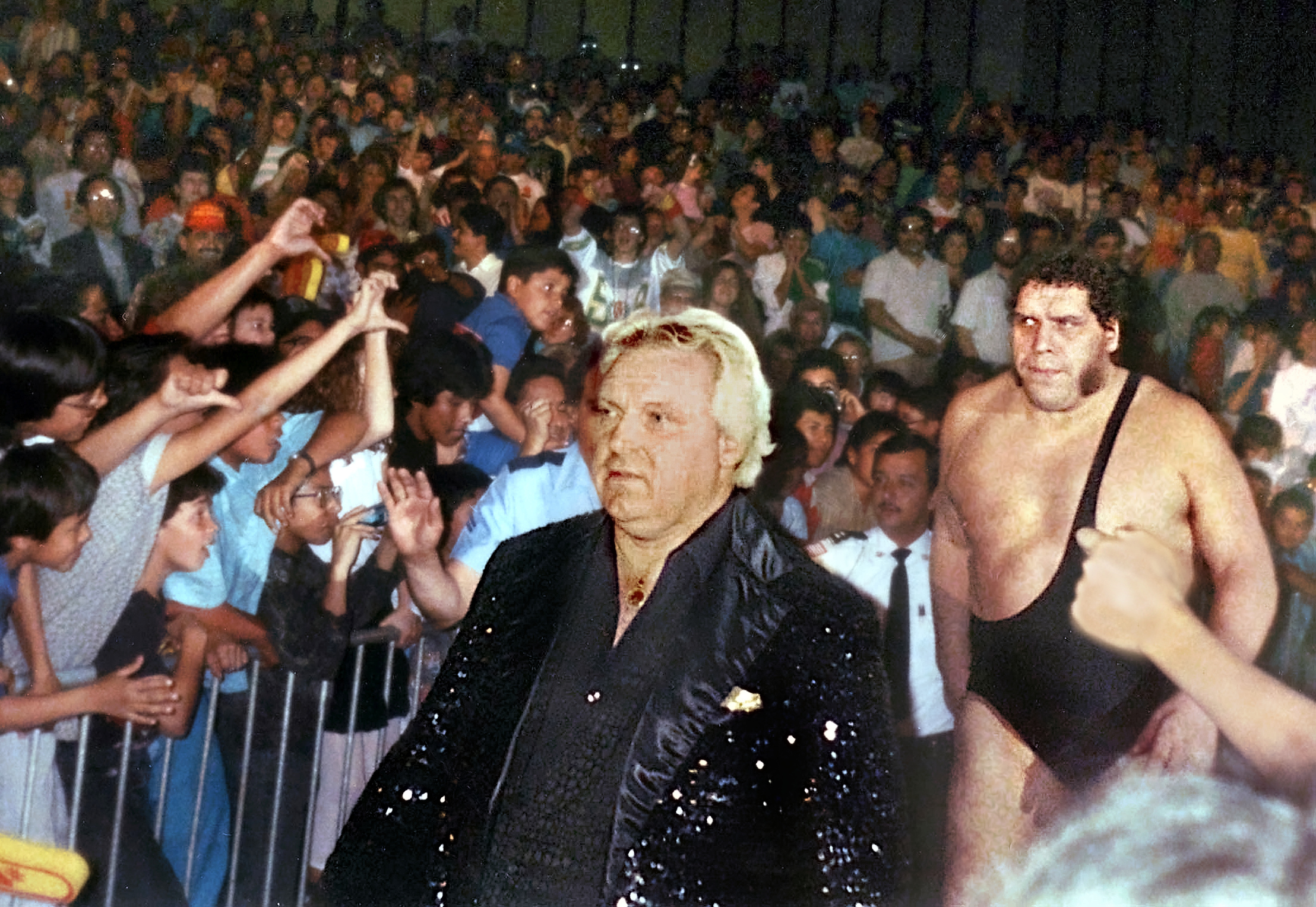
Roussimoff (right) was managed by Bobby Heenan (foreground) during parts of his feud with Hulk Hogan.

Roussimoff agreed to turn heel in early 1987 to be the counter to the biggest "babyface" in professional wrestling at that time, Hulk Hogan. On an edition of Piper's Pit in 1987, Hogan was presented a trophy for being the WWF World Heavyweight Champion for three years; Roussimoff came out to congratulate him, shaking Hogan's hand with a strong grip, which surprised the Hulkster. On the following week's Piper's Pit, Roussimoff was presented a slightly smaller trophy for being "the only undefeated wrestler in wrestling history." Although he had suffered a handful of countout and disqualification losses in WWF, he had never been pinned or forced to submit in a WWF ring. Hogan came out to congratulate him and ended up being the focal point of the interview. Apparently annoyed, Roussimoff walked out in the midst of Hogan's speech. A discussion between Roussimoff and Hogan was scheduled, and on a Piper's Pit that aired 7 February 1987, the two met. Hogan was introduced first, followed by Roussimoff, who was led by longtime rival Bobby Heenan.

Speaking on behalf of his new protégé, Heenan accused Hogan of being Roussimoff's friend only so he would not have to defend his title against him. Hogan tried to reason with Roussimoff, but his pleas were ignored as he challenged Hogan to a match for the WWF World Heavyweight Championship at WrestleMania III. Hogan was still seemingly in disbelief as to what Roussimoff was doing, prompting Heenan to say "You can't believe it? Maybe you'll believe this, Hogan" before Roussimoff ripped off the T-shirt and crucifix from Hogan, with the crucifix scratching Hogan's chest, causing him to bleed.

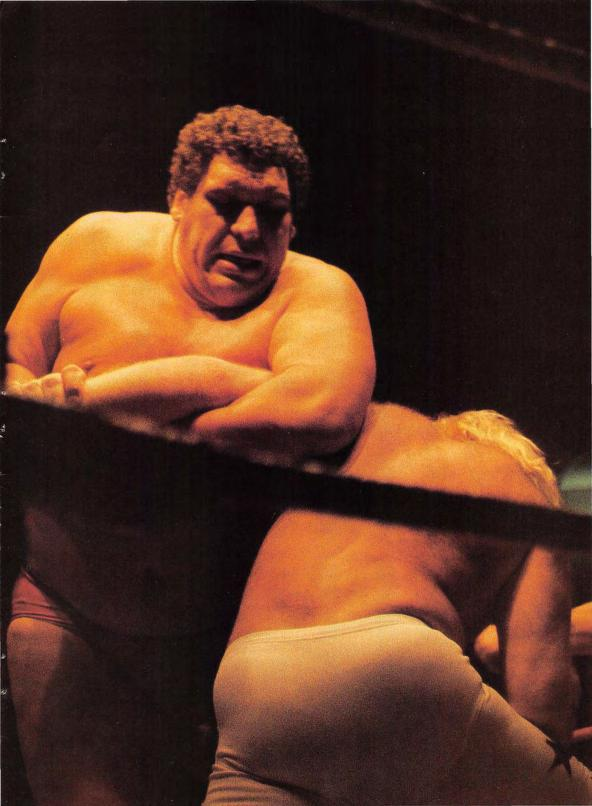
Andre in a match against Big John Studd in 1987

Following Hogan's acceptance of his challenge on a later edition of Piper's Pit, the two were part of a 20-man over-the-top-rope battle-royal on 14 March edition of Saturday Night's Main Event X at the Joe Louis Arena in Detroit. Although the battle royal was won by Hercules, Roussimoff claimed to have gained a psychological advantage over Hogan when he threw the WWF World Heavyweight Champion over the top rope. The match, which was actually taped on 21 February 1987, aired only two weeks before WrestleMania III to make it seem like Hogan had met his match in André the Giant.

At WrestleMania III, he was billed at 520 lb (236 kg), and the stress of such immense weight on his bones and joints resulted in constant pain. After recent back surgery, he was also wearing a brace underneath his wrestling singlet. In front of a record crowd, Hogan won the match after body-slamming Roussimoff (later dubbed "the bodyslam heard around the world"), followed by Hogan's running leg drop finisher. Years later, Hogan claimed that Roussimoff was so heavy, he felt more like 320 kg (700 lb), and that he tore his latissimus dorsi muscle when slamming him.

Another myth about the match is that no one, not even WWF owner Vince McMahon, knew until the day of the event whether Roussimoff would lose the match. In reality, he agreed to lose the match sometime before, mostly for health reasons. Contrary to popular belief, it was not the first time that Hogan had successfully body-slammed him in a WWF match. A then-heel Hogan had slammed a then-face Roussimoff following their match at the Showdown at Shea on 9 August 1980, though Roussimoff was somewhat lighter (around 210 kg (470 lb)) and more athletic at the time (Hogan also slammed him in a match in Hamburg, Pennsylvania, a month later). This took place in the territorial days of American wrestling three years before WWF began national expansion, so many of those who watched WrestleMania III had never seen the Giant slammed (Roussimoff had also previously allowed Harley Race, El Canek and Stan Hansen, among others, to slam him).

By the time of WrestleMania III, the WWF went national, giving more meaning to the Roussimoff–Hogan match that took place then. The feud between Roussimoff and Hogan simmered during the summer of 1987, as Roussimoff's health declined. The feud began heating up again when wrestlers were named the captains of rival teams at the inaugural Survivor Series event. During their approximately one minute of battling each other during the match, Hogan dominated Roussimoff and was on the brink of knocking him from the ring, but was tripped up by his partners, Bundy and One Man Gang, and would be counted out. Roussimoff went on to be the sole survivor of the match, pinning Bam Bam Bigelow before Hogan returned to the ring to attack André and knock him out of the ring. Roussimoff later got revenge when, after Hogan won a match against Bundy on Saturday Night's Main Event, he snuck up from behind and began choking Hogan to the brink of unconsciousness, not letting go even after an army of seven face-aligned wrestlers ran to the ring to try to pull him away; it took Hacksaw Jim Duggan breaking a piece of wood over his back (which he no-sold) for him to let go, after which Hogan was pulled to safety. As was the case with the SNME battle royal a year earlier, the series of events was one of the pieces that helped build interest in a possible one-on-one rematch between Hogan and Roussimoff, and to make it seem that Roussimoff was certain to win easily when they did meet. Meanwhile, Rousimoff returned to Germany in December 1987 for another match with Wanz, which he lost by countout.

In the meantime, the "Million Dollar Man" Ted DiBiase failed to persuade Hogan to sell him the WWF World Heavyweight Championship. After failing to defeat Hogan in a subsequent series of matches, DiBiase turned to Roussimoff to win it for him. He and DiBiase had teamed several times in the past, including in Japan and in the WWF in the late 1970s and early 1980s when both were faces at the time, but this was not acknowledged during this new storyline. The earlier attack and DiBiase's insertion into the feud set up the Hogan-Roussimoff rematch on The Main Event, to air 5 February 1988, on a live broadcast on NBC. Acting as his hired gun, Roussimoff won the WWF World Heavyweight Championship from Hogan (his first singles title) in a match where it was later revealed that appointed referee Dave Hebner was "detained backstage", and a replacement (whom Hogan afterwards initially accused of having been paid by DiBiase to get plastic surgery to look like Dave, but was revealed to have been his evil twin brother, Earl Hebner), who made a three-count on Hogan while Hogan's left shoulder was off the mat.

After winning, Roussimoff "sold" the title to DiBiase; the transaction was declared invalid by then-WWF president Jack Tunney and the title was declared vacant. This was shown on WWF's NBC program The Main Event. At WrestleMania IV, Roussimoff and Hulk Hogan fought to a double disqualification in a WWF title tournament match (with the idea in the storyline saying that Roussimoff was again working on DiBiase's behalf in giving DiBiase a clearer path in the tournament). Afterward, Roussimoff and Hogan's feud died down after a steel cage match held at WrestleFest on 31 July 1988, in Milwaukee. Hogan was the winner.

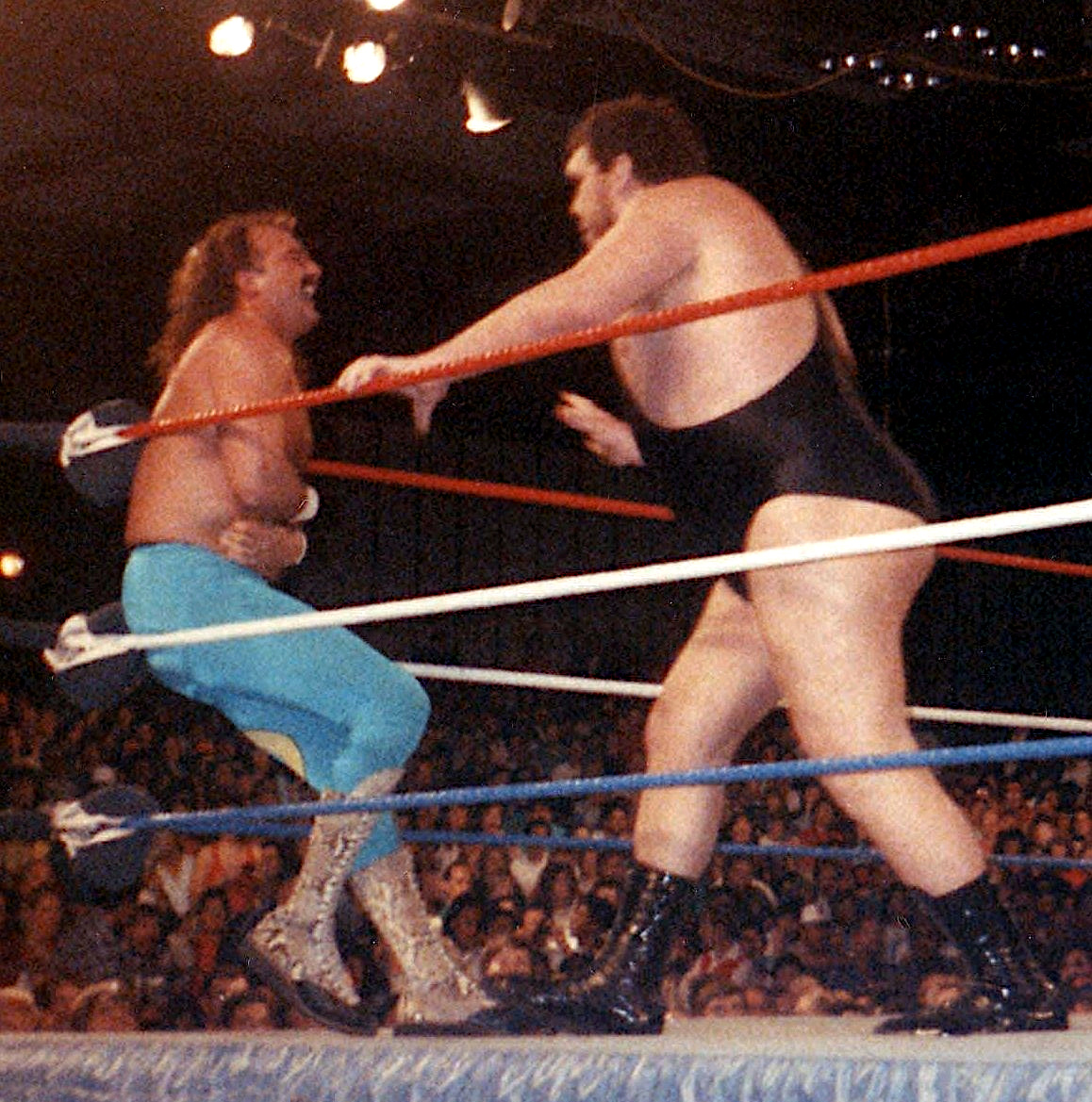
Roussimoff's feud with Jake Roberts derived from Roussimoff's fear of snakes.

At the inaugural SummerSlam pay-per-view held at Madison Square Garden, Roussimoff and DiBiase (billed as The Mega Bucks) faced Hogan and WWF World Heavyweight Champion "Macho Man" Randy Savage (known as The Mega Powers) in the main event, with Jesse "The Body" Ventura as the special guest referee. During the match, the Mega Powers' manager, Miss Elizabeth, distracted the Mega Bucks and Ventura when she climbed up on the ring apron, removed her yellow skirt and walked around in a pair of red panties. This allowed Hogan and Savage time to recover and eventually win the match with Hogan pinning DiBiase. Savage forced Ventura's hand down for the final three-count, due to Ventura's character historically being at odds with Hogan, and his unwillingness to count the fall.

Concurrent with the developing feud with the Mega Powers, Roussimoff was placed in a feud with Jim Duggan, which began after Duggan knocked out Roussimoff with a two-by-four board during a television taping. Despite Duggan's popularity with fans, Roussimoff regularly got the upper hand in the feud.

Roussimoff's next major feud was against Jake "The Snake" Roberts. In this storyline, it was said Roussimoff was afraid of snakes, something Roberts exposed on Saturday Night's Main Event when he threw his snake, Damien, on the frightened Roussimoff; as a result, he suffered a kayfabe mild heart attack and vowed revenge. During the next few weeks, Roberts frequently walked to ringside carrying his snake in its bag during Roussimoff's matches, causing the latter to run from the ring in fright. Throughout their feud (which culminated at WrestleMania V), Roberts constantly used Damien to gain a psychological edge over the much larger and stronger Roussimoff.

In 1989, Roussimoff and the returning Big John Studd briefly reprised their feud, beginning at WrestleMania V, when Studd was the referee in the match with Roberts, this time with Studd as a face and Roussimoff as the heel.

During the late summer and autumn of 1989, Roussimoff engaged in a brief feud, consisting almost entirely of house shows (non-televised events), and one televised match on 28 October 1989, at Madison Square Garden with then-WWF Intercontinental Champion Ultimate Warrior. Roussimoff began to wear face paint with a similar design to Warrior and began called himself the "Ultimate Giant" when he appeared on The Brother Love Show. The younger Warrior, the WWF's rising star, regularly squashed the aging Roussimoff in an attempt to showcase his star quality and promote him as the "next big thing".

==== Colossal Connection (1989–1990) ====
In late 1989, Roussimoff was joined with fellow Heenan Family member Haku to form a new tag team called the Colossal Connection, in part to fill a void left by the departure of Tully Blanchard and Arn Anderson (the Brain Busters, who were also members of Heenan's stable) from the WWF, and also to continue to keep the aging Roussimoff in the main event spotlight. He lost to Ultimate Warrior in 20 seconds at a house show in Cape Girardeau, Missouri on 11 December 1989. His last single match was a loss to Ultimate Warrior on March 3, 1990, at a house show in New Orleans, Louisiana. The Colossal Connection immediately targeted WWF Tag Team Champions Demolition (who had recently won the belts from the Brain Busters). At a television taping on 13 December 1989, the Colossal Connection defeated Demolition to win the titles. Roussimoff and Haku successfully defended their title, mostly against Demolition, until WrestleMania VI on 1 April 1990, when Demolition took advantage of a mistimed move by the champions to regain the belts. After the match, a furious Heenan blamed him for the title loss and after shouting at him, before Heenan slapped him in the face; an angry Roussimoff responded with a slap of his own that sent Heenan staggering from the ring. Roussimoff also caught Haku's kick attempt, sending him reeling from the ring as well, prompting support and turning Roussimoff face for the first time since 1987. Due to his ongoing health issues, Roussimoff was unable to wrestle at the time of WrestleMania VI and Haku actually wrestled the entire match against Demolition without tagging him in.

On weekend television shows following WrestleMania VI, Bobby Heenan vowed to spit in Roussimoff's face when he came crawling back to the Heenan Family. He wrestled one more time with Haku, teaming up to face Demolition on a house show in Honolulu on 10 April, Roussimoff was knocked out of the ring and The Colossal Connection lost via count-out. After the match, Roussimoff and Haku would fight each other, marking the end of the team. His final WWF match of 1990 came at a combined WWF/All Japan/New Japan show on 13 April in Tokyo, Japan when he teamed with Giant Baba to defeat Demolition in a non-title match. Roussimoff won by pinning Smash.

==== Sporadic appearances (1990–1991) ====
Roussimoff returned in the winter of 1990, but it was not to the World Wrestling Federation. Instead, Roussimoff made an interview appearance for Herb Abrams' fledgling Universal Wrestling Federation on 11 October in Reseda, California. (the segment aired in 1991). He appeared in an interview segment with Captain Lou Albano and put over the UWF. The following month on 30 November at a house show in Miami, Florida, the World Wrestling Federation announced his return as a participant in the 1991 Royal Rumble (to be held in Miami two months later). Roussimoff was also mentioned as a participant on television but would ultimately back out due to a leg injury.

His on-air return finally took place at the WWF's Super-Stars & Stripes Forever USA Network special on 17 March 1991, when he came out to shake the hand of Big Boss Man after an altercation with Mr. Perfect. The following week at WrestleMania VII, he came to the aid of the Boss Man in his match against Mr. Perfect. Roussimoff finally returned to action on 26 April 1991, in a six-man tag-team matchup when he teamed with The Rockers in a winning effort against Mr. Fuji and The Orient Express at a house show in Belfast, Northern Ireland. On 11 May 1991 he participated in a 17-man battle-royal at a house show in Detroit, which was won by Kerry Von Erich. This was Andre's final WWF match, although he was involved in several subsequent storylines. His last major WWF storyline following WrestleMania VII had the major heel managers (Bobby Heenan, Sensational Sherri, Slick, and Mr. Fuji) trying to recruit Roussimoff one-by-one, only to be turned down in various humiliating ways (e.g. Heenan had his hand crushed, Sherri received a spanking, Slick got locked in the trunk of the car he was offering to Roussimoff, and Mr. Fuji got a pie in his face). Finally, Jimmy Hart appeared live on WWF Superstars to announce that he had successfully signed Roussimoff to tag-team with Earthquake. When asked to confirm this by Gene Okerlund, Roussimoff denied the claims. This led to Earthquake's attacking Roussimoff from behind (injuring his knee). Jimmy Hart would later get revenge for the humiliation by secretly signing Tugboat and forming the Natural Disasters. This led to Roussimoff's final major WWF appearance at SummerSlam 1991, where he seconded the Bushwhackers in their match against the Disasters. Roussimoff was on crutches at ringside, and after the Disasters won the match, they set out to attack him, but the Legion of Doom made their way to ringside and got in between them and the Giant, who was preparing to defend himself with one of his crutches. The Disasters left the ringside area as they were outnumbered by the Legion of Doom, the Bushwhackers and Roussimoff, who struck both Earthquake and Typhoon (the former Tugboat) with the crutch as they left. His final WWF appearance came at a house show in Paris, France, on 9 October 1991. He was in Davey Boy Smith's corner as the Bulldog faced Earthquake; Smith hit Earthquake with Roussimoff's crutch, allowing Smith to win.

=== All Japan Pro Wrestling; Universal Wrestling Association (1990–1992) ===
After WrestleMania VI, Roussimoff spent the rest of his in-ring career in All Japan Pro Wrestling (AJPW) and Mexico's Universal Wrestling Association (UWA), where he performed under the name "André el Gigante". He toured with AJPW three times per year, from 1990 to 1992, usually teaming with Giant Baba in tag-team matches.

Roussimoff made a couple of guest appearances for Herb Abrams' Universal Wrestling Federation, in 1991, feuding with Big John Studd, though he never had a match in the promotion.

In his last U.S. television appearance, Andre appeared on World Championship Wrestling's (WCW) Clash of the Champions XX special that aired on TBS on 2 September 1992, where he gave a brief interview. During the same event, he appeared alongside Gordon Solie and was later seen talking with him during the gala celebrating the 20th anniversary of wrestling on TBS.

He did his final tour of Mexico in 1992 in a selection of six-man tag matches alongside Bam Bam Bigelow and a variety of Lucha Libre stars facing among others Bad News Allen and future WWF Champion Yokozuna. Roussimoff made his final tour with AJPW from October to December 1992; he wrestled what became the final match of his career on 4 December 1992, teaming with Giant Baba and Rusher Kimura to defeat Haruka Eigen, Masanobu Fuchi, and Motoshi Okuma.

== Acting career ==
Roussimoff branched out into acting in the 1970s and 1980s, after a 1967 French boxing film, making his USA acting debut playing a Sasquatch ("Bigfoot") in a two-part episode aired in 1976 on the television series The Six Million Dollar Man. He appeared in other television shows, including The Greatest American Hero, B. J. and the Bear, The Fall Guy and 1990's Zorro.

Towards the end of his career, Roussimoff appeared in several films. He had an uncredited appearance in the 1984 film Conan the Destroyer as Dagoth, the resurrected horned giant god who is killed by Conan (Arnold Schwarzenegger). That same year, he also made an appearance in Micki & Maude (billed as André Rousimmoff). He appeared most notably as Fezzik, his own favorite role, in the 1987 film The Princess Bride. Roussimoff found it novel and especially gratifying that no one stared at him on set during production. Both the film and his performance retain a devoted following. In a short interview with Lanny Poffo, André stated that the movie meant so much to him that he made his wrestling pals watch an advance copy of the VHS with him over and over again while supplying dinner, drinks, and sweetly asking each time, "Did you like my performance?".

In his last film, he had a cameo role as a circus giant in the comedy Trading Mom, which was released in 1994, a year after his death.

=== Filmography ===
| Year | Title | Role | Notes |
|---|---|---|---|
| 1967 | Casse-tête chinois pour le judoka | Fighter | Film |
| 1976 | The Six Million Dollar Man | Sasquatch | Television (episodes: "The Secret of Bigfoot, Part 1" and "The Secret of Bigfoot Part 2") |
| 1981 | B. J. and the Bear | Manny Felcher | Television (episode: "Snow White and the Seven Lady Truckers, Part 1") |
| 1982 | The Fall Guy | Killer Typhoon (uncredited) | Television (episode: "Ladies on the Ropes") |
| 1982 | Les Brillant | Jean Petit | Television |
| 1983 | The Greatest American Hero | Monster | Television (episode: "Heaven Is in Your Genes") |
| 1984 | Conan the Destroyer | Dagoth (uncredited) | Film |
| 1984 | Micki & Maude | Himself | Film |
| 1985 | I Like to Hurt People | Himself | Film |
| 1985 | The Goonies 'R' Good Enough | Himself (uncredited) | Music video |
| 1987 | The Princess Bride | Fezzik | Film |
| 1994 | Trading Mom | Circus Giant | Film, posthumous release |

== Personal life ==
Roussimoff was mentioned in the 1974 Guinness Book of World Records as the then-highest-paid wrestler in history. He earned an annual salary of approximately $400,000 (equivalent to $2,611,000 in 2025) at that time.

Robin Christensen is Roussimoff's only child. Her mother Jean Christensen (who died in 2008) became acquainted with Roussimoff through the wrestling business around 1972 or 1973. Christensen had regular contact with her father, but saw him only five times in her life. After his death, Christensen spoke positively about her father and became a guardian of his image and legacy. On April 17, 2026, Christensen appeared alongside Nick Hogan at the WWE Hall of Fame, when their respective fathers' WrestleMania III match was inducted as an Immortal Moment.

In 1989, Roussimoff was arrested and charged with assault after he attacked a KCRG-TV cameraman shooting his match with Ultimate Warrior at Cedar Rapids, Iowa's Five Seasons Center. While acquitted on the assault charge, he was fined $100 (equivalent to $260 in 2025) for criminal mischief and ordered to pay KCRG $233 (equivalent to $605 in 2025) in damage to its equipment.

William Goldman, the author of the novel and the screenplay of The Princess Bride, wrote in his nonfiction work Which Lie Did I Tell? that Roussimoff was one of the gentlest and most generous people he ever knew. Whenever Roussimoff ate with someone in a restaurant, he would pay, but he would also insist on paying when he was a guest. On one occasion, after Roussimoff attended a dinner with Arnold Schwarzenegger and Wilt Chamberlain, Schwarzenegger had quietly moved to the cashier to pay before Roussimoff could, but then found himself being physically lifted, carried from his table and deposited on top of his car by Roussimoff and Chamberlain.

Roussimoff owned a ranch in Ellerbe, North Carolina since the 1970s. Starting in 1980, Andre would also live at this ranch with both his close friend Frenchy Bernard and Bernard's then-wife Jackie. When he was not on the road, he loved spending time at the ranch, where he tended to his cattle, played with his dogs, and entertained friends. While there were custom-made chairs and a few other modifications in his home to accommodate his size, tales that everything in his home was custom-made for a large man are said to be exaggerated. Since Roussimoff could not easily go shopping due to his fame and size, he was known to spend hours watching and purchasing items from the shopping channel QVC.

Roussimoff was good friends with fellow professional wrestler William Eadie, better known as Ax. In a 2016 interview Eadie revealed that Roussimoff was the godfather of his two daughters.

=== Health ===
Roussimoff has been dubbed "the greatest drunk on Earth" for once consuming 119 12-US-fluid-ounce (350 mL) beers (in total, over 41 litres [72 imp pt] or 11.16 gallons) in six hours. In an appearance on Late Night with David Letterman on 23 January 1984, Roussimoff told David Letterman he once drank 117 beers. When Letterman asked if he was drunk, Roussimoff said he couldn't remember because he passed out. He also said he quit drinking beer 14 months prior to this appearance on Letterman.

On an episode of WWE's Legends of Wrestling, Mike Graham said Roussimoff once drank 156 16-US-fluid-ounce (470 mL) beers (over 73 litres [128 imp pt] or 19.5 gallons) in one sitting, which was confirmed by Dusty Rhodes. The Fabulous Moolah wrote in her autobiography that Roussimoff drank 127 beers at the bar of the Abraham Lincoln Hotel in Reading, Pennsylvania and later passed out in the lobby. The staff could not move him and had to leave him there until he awoke.

In a shoot interview, Ken Patera recalled an occasion where Roussimoff was challenged by Dick Murdoch to a beer drinking contest. After nine or so hours, Roussimoff had drunk 116 beers. A tale recounted by Cary Elwes in his book about the making of The Princess Bride has Roussimoff falling on top of somebody while drunk, after which the NYPD sent an undercover officer to follow Roussimoff around whenever he went out drinking in their city to make sure he did not fall on anyone again.

Another story says that, prior to his famous WrestleMania III match, Roussimoff drank 14 bottles of wine. Hulk Hogan has stated that Roussimoff drank a case of 12 bottles of Pouilly-Fuissé during a three-hour bus journey.

An urban legend exists surrounding Roussimoff's 1987 surgery in which his size made it impossible for the anesthesiologist to estimate a dosage via standard methods; consequently, his alcohol tolerance was used as a guideline instead. Some reports claim this is true.

Some stories of Roussimoff's eating have circulated, such as one dinner where he ate twelve 16-ounce steaks and fifteen lobsters in one sitting. However, according to his usual traveling partner Tim White, Roussimoff only ate so much on occasion to show off, saying, "He had a substantial appetite, but for his size, it was completely normal."

Roussimoff had severe pericardial effusion and underwent pericardiocentesis at Duke University Hospital in the 1980s. Dr. PR Rankin Jr., a renowned physician who served in the North Carolina state government under former North Carolina Governor Jim Hunt and who was also based in Andre's adopted home of Ellerbe, North Carolina, was among Andre's most trusted doctors.

== Death ==
On the morning of 28 January 1993, Roussimoff died of congestive heart failure and an apparent heart attack in his sleep, likely associated with his untreated acromegaly, at a Paris hotel, at the age of 46, 13 days after his father. After he visited and played cards in Molien with some of his oldest friends on the night of 27 January 1993, he returned to his hotel room around 1 a.m. CET on 28 January. Twelve hours later that afternoon, Roussimoff was found dead in his room by hotel management and his chauffeur. He was in Paris at the time to attend his father's funeral. While there, he had decided to extend his stay there to be with his mother on her birthday.

In his will, he specified that his remains should be cremated and "disposed of". Upon his death in Paris, his family in France held a funeral for him, intending to bury him near his father. When they learned of his wish to be cremated, his body was flown to the United States, where he was cremated according to his wishes. Those who spoke at Andre's funeral included Frenchy Bernard, Jackie Bernard, Darrell Dickenson (who supplied Andre's ranch with Texas Longhorn cattle), Hulk Hogan, Dr. PR Rankin Jr., Terry Todd, and Tim White. His ashes were scattered at his ranch in Ellerbe, North Carolina. Additionally, in accordance with his will, he left his estate to his daughter Robin, his sole beneficiary. However, some of Andre's wrestling memorabilia would also be donated to Dr. Rankin's museum in Ellerbe as well.

== Other media ==
Roussimoff made numerous appearances as himself in video games, starting with WWF WrestleMania. He also appears posthumously in Virtual Pro Wrestling 64, WWF No Mercy, Legends of Wrestling, Legends of Wrestling II, Showdown: Legends of Wrestling, WWE SmackDown! vs. Raw, WWE SmackDown! vs. Raw 2006, WWE Legends of WrestleMania, WWE All Stars, WWE 2K14, WWE 2K15, WWE 2K16, WWE 2K17, WWE 2K18, WWE 2K19, WWE 2K20, WWE 2K Battlegrounds, WWE 2K22, WWE 2K23, WWE 2K24, and many others.

In January 2005, WWE released André The Giant, a DVD focusing on the life and career of Roussimoff. The DVD is a reissue of the out-of-print André The Giant VHS made by Coliseum Video in 1985, with commentary by Michael Cole and Tazz replacing Gorilla Monsoon and Jesse Ventura's commentary on his WrestleMania match with Big John Studd. The video is hosted by Lord Alfred Hayes. Later matches, including his battles against Hulk Hogan while a heel, are not included on this VHS.

== Legacy ==
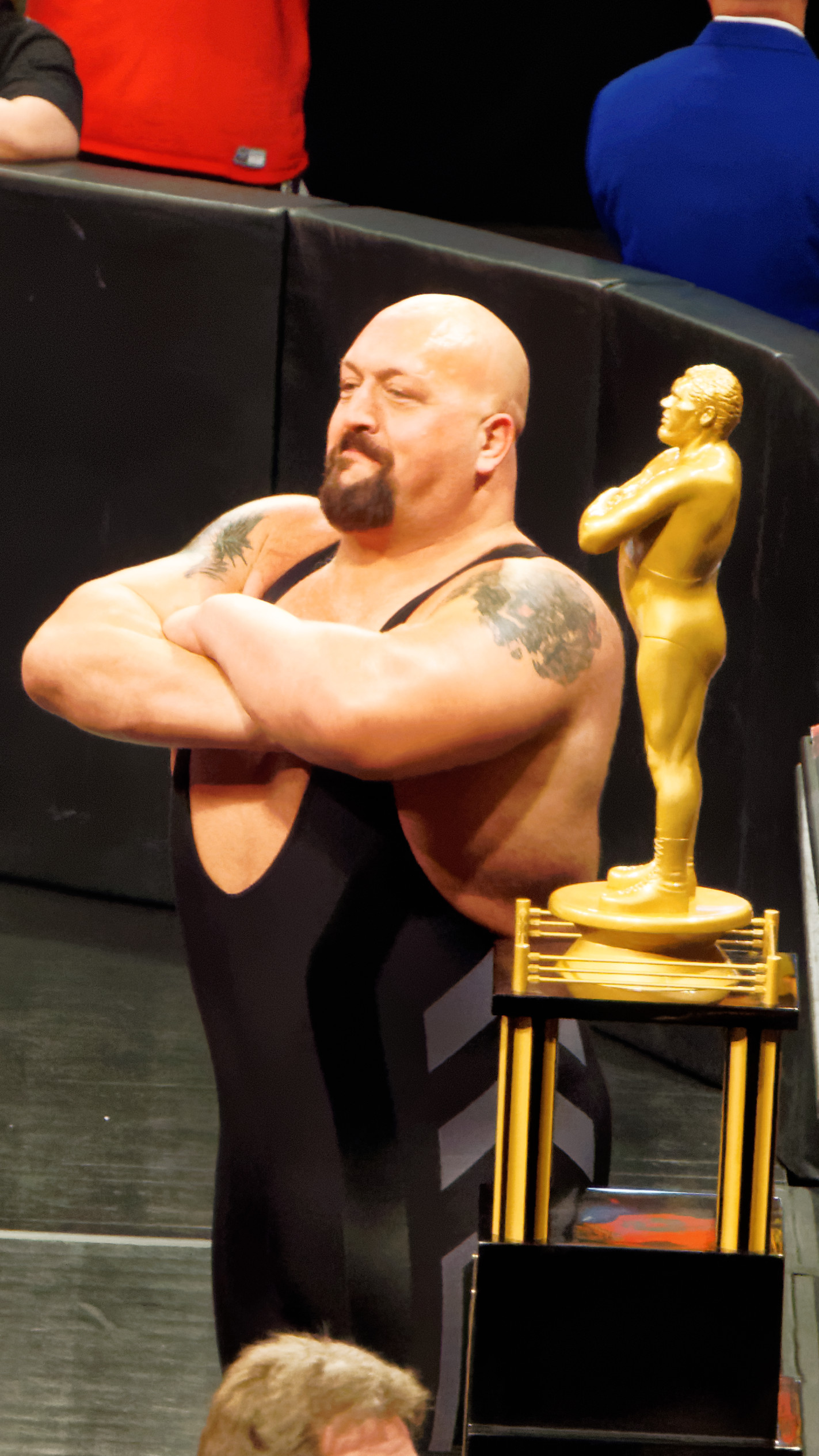
Big Show—a wrestler often compared with Roussimoff due to being billed as "The Giant"—was the winner of the 2015 "André the Giant Memorial Battle Royal" at WrestleMania 31, and is posing alongside the André the Giant Memorial Trophy, which goes to the winner of the annual match.

- In 1993, when the then-World Wrestling Federation created the WWF Hall of Fame, André the Giant was the inaugural and sole inductee in the class of 1993.
- Roussimoff was the inspiration for the 1998 film My Giant, written by his friend Billy Crystal, whom he had met during the filming of The Princess Bride.
- Paul Wight, better known as Big Show, is more similar in body structure to Roussimoff than any other wrestler since Roussimoff's death. He was originally billed as the son of André during his stint in WCW (when he was known as simply "the Giant") despite there being no biological relationship. While also suffering from acromegaly, unlike Roussimoff, Wight did get surgery on his pituitary gland in the early 1990s, which successfully halted the progress of his condition. The former wrestler Giant González suffered from problems similar to those that Roussimoff had near the end of his life and died in 2010 due to diabetes complications.
- In 1999, he was the subject of an episode of A&E Biography, titled André the Giant: Larger Than Life. The documentary covered his childhood and early life in France, as well as the beginning of his wrestling career, his struggles with acromegaly, his personal life, and his final years. His brother, Jacques Roussimoff, was interviewed for the documentary, as were fellow wrestling personalities Gorilla Monsoon, Tim White, Arnold Skaaland, Vince McMahon, Freddie Blassie, Killer Kowalski, Rene Goulet, and Frenchy Bernard, as well as wrestling historian Sheldon Goldberg. Several of his longtime hometown friends were interviewed as well. The documentary described Roussimoff as pro wrestling's "first and only international attraction" and that "on his broad shoulders, wrestling rose from its status as a questionable sport to become big business, and some might argue, performance art."
- The Obey brand icon originated from wheatpaste posters that artist Shepard Fairey created based upon a photo of André the Giant that he had found in a newspaper.
- Capcom's video game character Hugo, from the Street Fighter series (known as Andore in the Final Fight series) is based on him.
- The 2014 graphic novel André The Giant: The Life and The Legend (First Second Books), written and drawn by Box Brown, tells the story of his life and career. Research for the book included interviews with his fellow wrestlers and actors such as Christopher Guest, Mandy Patinkin and others.
- In 2017, Showtime released Waiting for Andre, a semi-fictional movie about the friendship between playwright Samuel Beckett and Roussimoff during the time Beckett lived in Ussy-sur-Marne, outside of Paris. A novel of the movie was published the following year by Steffan Piper (ISBN 9781980756217 / 198075621X from Amazon print on demand).
- On 10 March 2014, episode of Raw, WrestleMania XXX host Hulk Hogan announced that in honor of Roussimoff's legacy, WWE was establishing the André the Giant Memorial Battle Royal, that would take place at the event, with the winner receiving the André the Giant Memorial Trophy (made in the likeness of Roussimoff). On 6 April 2014, at WrestleMania XXX, Cesaro won the match after eliminating Big Show using a body slam similar to the body slam Hulk Hogan used on Roussimoff at WrestleMania III. The battle royal has since become a yearly WrestleMania Weekend tradition.
- Historical marker dedicated in his honor at the intersection of NC 73 and Old NC 220 in Ellerbe, North Carolina.

=== Biopics ===
- In 1999, Biography produced and aired a documentary called Andre The Giant: Larger Than Life.
- On 9 May 2016, it was announced that a movie based on the 2015 authorized graphic novel biography André the Giant: Closer to Heaven was in the plans made by Lion Forge Comics along with producers Scott Steindorff, Dylan Russell and consulted by Roussimoff's daughter, Robin Christensen-Roussimoff.
- On 10 April 2018, HBO aired a documentary film called André the Giant.

== Championships and accomplishments ==
- 50th State Big Time Wrestling
  - Texas Battle Royal (1977)
- All Japan Pro Wrestling
  - World's Strongest Tag Determination League East Sports Special Award (1991) – with Giant Baba
- Championship Wrestling from Florida
  - NWA Florida Tag Team Championship (1 time) – with Dusty Rhodes
- Fédération Française de Catch Professionnel
  - World Heavyweight Championship (France) (1 time)
- Houston Wrestling
  - Two-Ring Battle Royal (1974, 1975)
- International Professional Wrestling Hall of Fame
  - Class of 2021
- International Wrestling Enterprise
  - IWA World Tag Team Championship (1 time) – with Michael Nador
- NWA Hollywood Wrestling
  - Los Angeles Battle Royal (1975, 1980)
- NWA San Francisco
  - Cow Palace Battle Royal (1977)
- New Japan Pro-Wrestling
  - International Wrestling Grand Prix (1985)
  - MSG League (1982)
  - MSG Tag League (1981) – with Rene Goulet
  - Sagawa Express Cup (1986)
  - Greatest 18 Club inductee
- NWA Tri-State
  - NWA United States Tag Team Championship (Tri-State version) (1 time) – with Dusty Rhodes
- Professional Wrestling Hall of Fame and Museum
  - Class of 2002
- Pro Wrestling Illustrated
  - Most Popular Wrestler of the Year (1977, 1982)
  - Match of the Year (1981) vs. Killer Khan on 2 May
  - Match of the Year (1988) vs. Hulk Hogan at The Main Event
  - Most Hated Wrestler of the Year (1988)
  - Editor's Award (1993)
  - Ranked No. 3 of the top 500 singles wrestlers of the "PWI Years" in 2003
- The Official Wrestling Museum
  - The Official Wrestling Museum Hall of Fame (2023)
- Sports Illustrated
  - Ranked No. 16 of the 20 Greatest WWE Wrestlers Of All Time
- Stampede Wrestling
  - Stampede Wrestling Hall of Fame (Class of 1995)
- St. Louis Wrestling Hall of Fame

- Class of 2026

- World Championship Wrestling (Australia)
  - NWA Austra-Asian Tag Team Championship (1 time) – with Ron Miller
- World Wrestling Federation
  - WWF World Heavyweight Championship (1 time)
  - WWF Tag Team Championship (1 time) – with Haku
  - Slammy Award (1 time)
    - Bobby "The Brain" Heenan Scholarship Award (1987) with The Islanders (Haku and Tama), Hercules, King Kong Bundy and Harley Race
  - WWF Hall of Fame (2 times)
    - Class of 1993 – individually
    - Class of 2026 – Immortal Moment – vs Hulk Hogan at WrestleMania 3
- Wrestling Observer Newsletter
  - Feud of the Year (1981) vs. Killer Khan
  - Most Embarrassing Wrestler (1989)
  - Worst Feud of the Year (1984) vs. Big John Studd
  - Worst Feud of the Year (1989) vs. Ultimate Warrior
  - Worst Worked Match of the Year (1987) vs. Hulk Hogan at WrestleMania 3
  - Worst Worked Match of the Year (1989) vs. Ultimate Warrior on 31 October
  - Worst Tag Team (1990, 1991) with Giant Baba
  - Worst Wrestler (1989, 1991, 1992)
  - Wrestling Observer Newsletter Hall of Fame (Class of 1996)
- Canadian Wrestling Hall of Fame
  - Class of 2016

== See also ==
- List of tallest people
- List of premature professional wrestling deaths
