= List of WWE Champions =

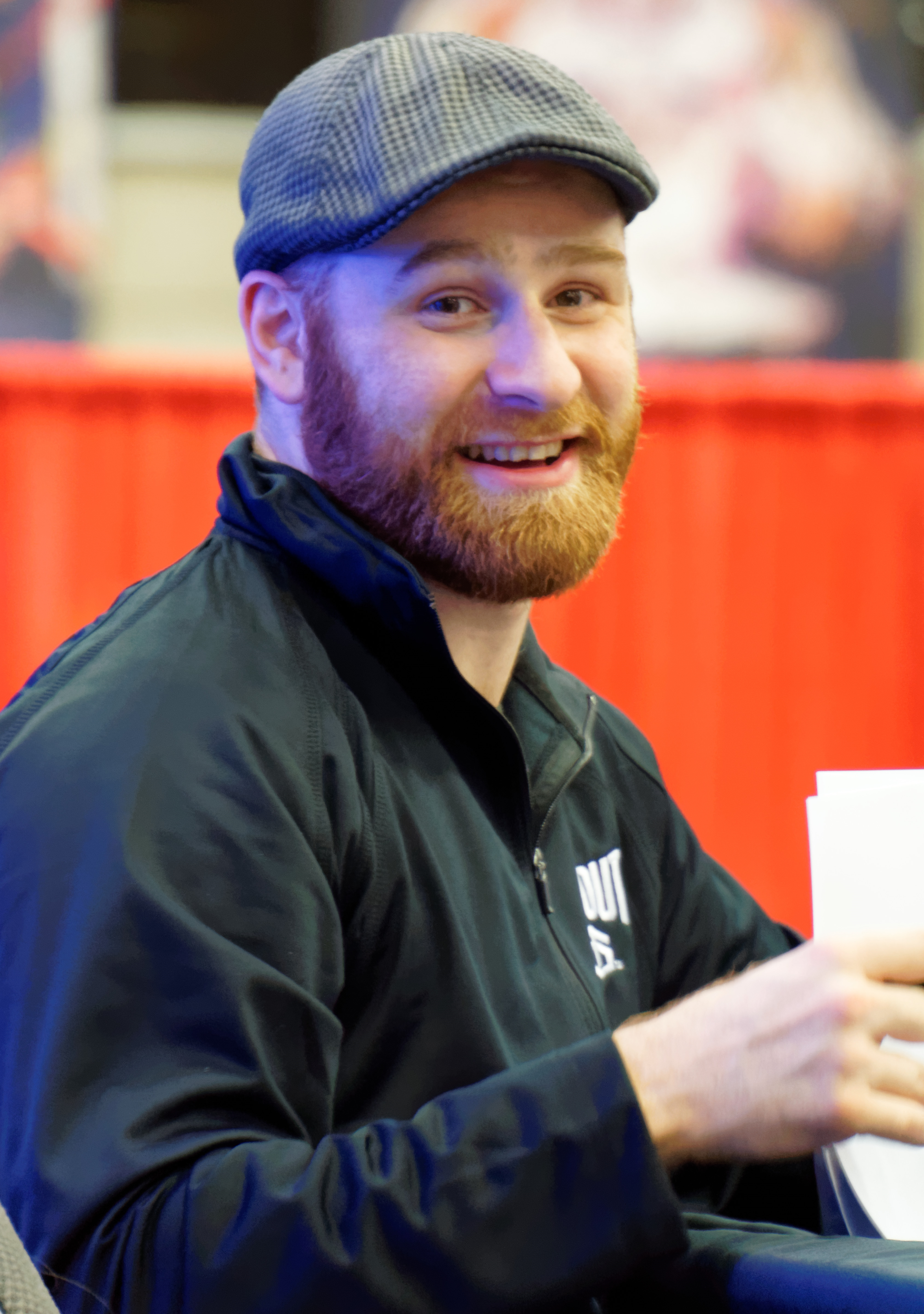
Current and two-time champion Sami Zayn

The WWE Championship, also referred to as the Undisputed WWE Championship since April 2024, is a men's professional wrestling world heavyweight championship in WWE, defended on the SmackDown brand. It was the first world title established in WWE, at the time known as the World Wide Wrestling Federation (WWWF), having been introduced in 1963 as the WWWF World Heavyweight Championship. The WWWF, a National Wrestling Alliance (NWA) territory, did not recognize Lou Thesz's victory over reigning NWA champion Buddy Rogers and sought to create its own world title upon exiting the body. (Note: By convention, the title would only change hands after a two-out-of-three pinfall victory; however, Thesz defeated Rogers after one fall, prompting some dissent from a few associated territories of the NWA, who chose not to recognize the title change.) The WWWF rejoined the NWA in 1971; however, one of the caveats of rejoining is that the championship would no longer be recognized as a "world championship", and only as a regional heavyweight championship.

The WWWF was renamed World Wrestling Federation (WWF) in 1979 and ended its affiliation with the NWA in 1983, with the title also renamed to reflect the changes; it regained its world championship status upon leaving the NWA. In 2001, it was unified with the World Championship and became the Undisputed WWF Championship. In 2002, the WWF was renamed World Wrestling Entertainment (WWE) and split its roster into two brands (named after their television show): Raw and SmackDown. The title, now renamed the WWE Championship, was then designated to the SmackDown brand while WWE established an alternate world title known as the World Heavyweight Championship for the Raw brand. A third alternate world title, the ECW World Heavyweight Championship, was reactivated for the ECW brand in 2006. It was vacated and decommissioned when the ECW brand disbanded in 2010.

When WWE Champion Randy Orton defeated World Heavyweight Champion John Cena at the TLC: Tables, Ladders & Chairs pay-per-view event on December 15, 2013, in a TLC match, the World Heavyweight Championship was unified with the WWE Championship, resulting in the retiring of the former, as well as the renaming of the latter to the WWE World Heavyweight Championship. On June 27, 2016, the name was shortened back to the WWE Championship, before assuming the WWE World Championship name on July 26, when the brand split returned. It became designated to the SmackDown brand and WWE again established an alternate world title known as the WWE Universal Championship for the Raw brand. In December 2016, WWE again shortened the title's name back to WWE Championship. From April 2022 to April 2024, the title represented one-half of the Undisputed WWE Universal Championship, with the other half represented by the Universal Championship; both titles retained their individual lineages. Under the Undisputed WWE Universal Championship moniker, the title was moved to SmackDown in the 2023 WWE Draft and Raw established a new World Heavyweight Championship as an alternative title.

The championship is generally contested in professional wrestling matches, in which participants execute scripted finishes rather than contend in direct competition. Some reigns were held by champions using a ring name while others use their real name. The current champion is Sami Zayn who is in his second reign. He won the title by defeating CM Punk on the September 11, 2026, episode of SmackDown in Azcapotzalco, Mexico City, Mexico. As of November 21, 2026, there have been 154 recognized reigns between 56 recognized champions and 11 recognized vacancies (there are 4 reigns, 2 people, and 2 vacancies that are not recognized by WWE). The first champion was Buddy Rogers, who was awarded the championship in 1963. The champion with the single longest reign is Bruno Sammartino, the second title holder whose first reign lasted 2,803 days (7 years, 8 months, and 1 day) while the record for longest combined reign is also held by Sammartino at 4,040 days across his two reigns. Cena has the most reigns with 14. Ten men in history have held the championship for a continuous reign of one year (365 days) or more: Sammartino (who achieved the feat on two occasions), Pedro Morales, Bob Backlund, Hulk Hogan, Randy Savage, John Cena, CM Punk, AJ Styles, Roman Reigns, and Cody Rhodes. Of those ten, four held the championship for a continuous reign of 1,000 days or more: Sammartino (who achieved the feat on two occasions), Morales, Backlund, and Hogan.

== Title history ==
=== Names ===
Name	Years
WWWF World Heavyweight Championship	April 25, 1963 – February 8, 1971
WWWF Heavyweight Championship	February 8, 1971 – March 1, 1979
WWF Heavyweight Championship	March 1, 1979 – December 26, 1983
WWF World Heavyweight Championship	December 26, 1983 – May 27, 1989
WWF Championship	May 27, 1989 – December 9, 2001
Undisputed WWF Championship	December 9, 2001 – May 6, 2002
Undisputed WWE Championship	May 6, 2002 – May 19, 2002
WWE Undisputed Championship	May 19, 2002 – September 2, 2002
WWE Championship	September 2, 2002 – December 15, 2013
Undisputed WWE Championship	August 14, 2011 – August 15, 2011
WWE World Heavyweight Championship	December 15, 2013 – June 27, 2016
WWE Championship	June 27, 2016 – July 24, 2016
WWE World Championship	July 25, 2016 – December 9, 2016
WWE Championship	December 10, 2016 – present
Undisputed WWE Universal Championship	April 3, 2022 – April 7, 2024
Undisputed WWE Championship	April 7, 2024 – present

=== Reigns ===
As of November 21, 2026

Key
No.	Overall reign number
Reign	Reign number for the specific champion
Days	Number of days held
Days recog.	Number of days held recognized by the promotion
†	Championship change is unrecognized by the promotion
<1	Reign lasted less than a day
+	Current reign is changing daily

No.	Champion	Championship change			Reign statistics			Notes	Ref.
No.	Champion	Date	Event	Location	Reign	Days	Days recog.	Notes	Ref.
World Wide Wrestling Federation (WWWF)
1	Buddy Rogers	April 1, 1963	Heavyweight Wrestling	Washington, D.C.	1	46	21	Rogers had been NWA World Heavyweight Champion since 1961. After Rogers lost the title to Lou Thesz on January 24, 1963, Capitol Wrestling Corporation did not recognize this title change and withdrew from the National Wrestling Alliance (NWA) to form the World Wide Wrestling Federation (WWWF). The WWWF continued to recognize Rogers as world champion and awarded him with the inaugural WWWF World Heavyweight Championship on April 1, 1963, in kayfabe claiming he defeated Antonino Rocca in a tournament final in Rio de Janeiro. WWE recognizes the reign as starting on April 25, 1963.	
2	Bruno Sammartino	May 17, 1963	House show	New York, NY	1	2,803	2,803		
3	Ivan Koloff	January 18, 1971	House show	New York, NY	1	21	21		
4	Pedro Morales	February 8, 1971	House show	New York, NY	1	1,027	1,027	The title was renamed the WWWF Heavyweight Championship when the WWWF rejoined the National Wrestling Alliance in 1971.	
National Wrestling Alliance: World Wide Wrestling Federation (WWWF) (Note: During the 1971–1983 period when the WWWF/WWF was a member of the NWA, the title was not recognized as a world championship.)
5	Stan Stasiak	December 1, 1973	House show	Philadelphia, PA	1	9	9		
6	Bruno Sammartino	December 10, 1973	House show	New York, NY	2	1,237	1,237		
7	"Superstar" Billy Graham	April 30, 1977	House show	Baltimore, MD	1	296	296		
8	Bob Backlund	February 20, 1978	WWF on MSG Network	New York, NY	1	648	2,135	The WWWF was renamed World Wrestling Federation in March 1979 with the title renamed accordingly.	
National Wrestling Alliance: World Wrestling Federation (WWF)
†	Antonio Inoki	November 30, 1979	Toukon Series	Tokushima, Japan	—	6	—	WWE acknowledges that this championship match took place; however, due to the controversial nature of the match, they do not recognize that the title changed hands due to the finish. During the September 30, 2022, episode of SmackDown (October 1 in Japan due to the time difference), in referencing this match in memory of Inoki, who died that day, commentator Corey Graves stated that Inoki had a "legitimate claim" to the WWE Championship.	
—	Vacated	December 6, 1979	—	Tokyo, Japan	—	—	—	Antonio Inoki immediately vacated the title after a title defense rematch with Bob Backlund ended in a no contest due to the interference of New Japan Pro-Wrestling's Tiger Jeet Singh.	
†	Bob Backlund	December 17, 1979	WWF on MSG Network	New York, NY	1	1,470	—	Defeated Bobby Duncum in a Texas deathmatch to fill the vacancy. On October 19, 1981, following a controversial match with Greg Valentine in Madison Square Garden (MSG), the title was vacated (recognized only in New York City) by the New York State Athletic Commission. Backlund defeated Valentine in a rematch at MSG on November 23, 1981, to end the vacancy. WWE recognizes this whole period as one uninterrupted reign. The title was renamed the WWF World Heavyweight Championship when the WWF ended its affiliation with the National Wrestling Alliance in August 1983.	
World Wrestling Federation (WWF)
9	The Iron Sheik	December 26, 1983	WWF on MSG Network	New York, NY	1	28	28	The Iron Sheik won by submission when Bob Backlund's manager Arnold Skaaland threw in the towel.	
10	Hulk Hogan	January 23, 1984	WWF on MSG Network	New York, NY	1	1,474	1,474		
11	André the Giant	February 5, 1988	The Main Event I	Indianapolis, IN	1	<1	<1	Defeated Hulk Hogan when referee Earl Hebner, who was bribed by Ted DiBiase, scored the three-count despite Hogan kicking-out by raising his shoulder at the one-count.	
†	Ted DiBiase	February 5, 1988	The Main Event I	Indianapolis, IN	1	8	—	Immediately after winning the title from Hulk Hogan, André the Giant handed the championship belt to Ted DiBiase, but WWF President Jack Tunney refused to recognize DiBiase's reign and declared the title vacant. In the subsequent days, DiBiase defended the title once against Bam Bam Bigelow at a house show on February 8, 1988.	
—	Vacated	February 13, 1988	Superstars of Wrestling	Hershey, PA	—	—	—	WWF President Jack Tunney refused to recognize Ted DiBiase as champion and vacated the title. WWE recognizes the vacancy as starting on February 5, 1988, the date of the controversy, rather than when the decision aired on tape delay on February 13, 1988.	
12	Randy Savage	March 27, 1988	WrestleMania IV	Atlantic City, NJ	1	371	371	Defeated Ted DiBiase in a tournament final to win the vacant title.	
13	Hulk Hogan	April 2, 1989	WrestleMania V	Atlantic City, NJ	2	364	364	The title was renamed the WWF Championship in May 1989.	
14	Ultimate Warrior	April 1, 1990	WrestleMania VI	Toronto, ON, Canada	1	293	293	This was a title vs. title match in which Warrior defended the Intercontinental Championship.	
15	Sgt. Slaughter	January 19, 1991	Royal Rumble	Miami, FL	1	64	64		
16	Hulk Hogan	March 24, 1991	WrestleMania VII	Los Angeles, CA	3	248	248		
17	The Undertaker	November 27, 1991	Survivor Series	Detroit, MI	1	6	6		
18	Hulk Hogan	December 3, 1991	This Tuesday in Texas	San Antonio, TX	4	1	1		
—	Vacated	December 4, 1991	Superstars of Wrestling	Austin, TX	—	—	—	Hulk Hogan was stripped of the title by WWF President Jack Tunney due to the controversy surrounding both of the previous title changes. Aired on tape delay on December 7, 1991.	
19	Ric Flair	January 19, 1992	Royal Rumble	Albany, NY	1	77	77	This was the 30-man Royal Rumble match. Flair last eliminated Sid Justice to win the vacant title.	
20	Randy Savage	April 5, 1992	WrestleMania VIII	Indianapolis, IN	2	149	149		
21	Ric Flair	September 1, 1992	Prime Time Wrestling	Hershey, PA	2	41	41	Aired on tape delay on September 14, 1992.	
22	Bret Hart	October 12, 1992	House show	Saskatoon, SK, Canada	1	174	174		
23	Yokozuna	April 4, 1993	WrestleMania IX	Paradise, NV	1	<1	<1		
24	Hulk Hogan	April 4, 1993	WrestleMania IX	Paradise, NV	5	70	70	After Yokozuna pinned Bret Hart to win the title, Yokozuna's manager, Mr. Fuji, immediately challenged Hogan, who accepted and defeated Yokozuna to win the title.	
25	Yokozuna	June 13, 1993	King of the Ring	Dayton, OH	2	280	280		
26	Bret Hart	March 20, 1994	WrestleMania X	New York, NY	2	248	248	Roddy Piper was the guest referee.	
27	Bob Backlund	November 23, 1994	Survivor Series	San Antonio, TX	2	3	3	This was a Throw in the Towel match.	
28	Diesel	November 26, 1994	House show	New York, NY	1	358	358		
29	Bret Hart	November 19, 1995	Survivor Series	Landover, MD	3	133	133	This was a no disqualification match.	
30	Shawn Michaels	March 31, 1996	WrestleMania XII	Anaheim, CA	1	231	231	This was a 60-minute Iron Man match in which Michaels won 1–0 in overtime.	
31	Sycho Sid	November 17, 1996	Survivor Series	New York, NY	1	63	63		
32	Shawn Michaels	January 19, 1997	Royal Rumble	San Antonio, TX	2	25	25		
—	Vacated	February 13, 1997	Raw	Lowell, MA	—	—	—	Shawn Michaels forfeited the title due to a knee injury.	
33	Bret Hart	February 16, 1997	In Your House 13: Final Four	Chattanooga, TN	4	1	1	This was a four corners elimination match for the vacant title also involving "Stone Cold" Steve Austin, The Undertaker, and Vader.	
34	Sycho Sid	February 17, 1997	Raw	Nashville, TN	2	34	34		
35	The Undertaker	March 23, 1997	WrestleMania 13	Rosemont, IL	2	133	133	This was a no disqualification match.	
36	Bret Hart	August 3, 1997	SummerSlam	East Rutherford, NJ	5	98	98	Shawn Michaels was the guest referee.	
37	Shawn Michaels	November 9, 1997	Survivor Series	Montreal, QC, Canada	3	140	140	This was the Montreal Screwjob.	
38	"Stone Cold" Steve Austin	March 29, 1998	WrestleMania XIV	Boston, MA	1	91	91	Mike Tyson was the special outside enforcer.	
39	Kane	June 28, 1998	King of the Ring	Pittsburgh, PA	1	1	1	This was a First Blood match; had Kane lost, he would have set himself on fire.	
40	"Stone Cold" Steve Austin	June 29, 1998	Raw	Cleveland, OH	2	90	90		
—	Vacated	September 27, 1998	Breakdown: In Your House	Hamilton, ON, Canada	—	—	—	The title was vacated after Kane and The Undertaker simultaneously pinned "Stone Cold" Steve Austin in a triple threat match.	
41	The Rock	November 15, 1998	Survivor Series	St. Louis, MO	1	44	50	Defeated Mankind in the finals of the Deadly Game tournament in a recreation of the Montreal Screwjob to win the vacant title. WWE recognizes The Rock's reign as ending on January 4, 1999, when the following episode aired on tape delay.	
42	Mankind	December 29, 1998	Raw	Worcester, MA	1	26	20	This was a no disqualification match. WWE recognizes Mankind's reign as beginning on January 4, 1999, when the episode aired on tape delay.	
43	The Rock	January 24, 1999	Royal Rumble	Anaheim, CA	2	2	7	This was an "I Quit" match which The Rock won by knocking Mankind unconscious while an audio recording of Mankind saying "I quit" was played when The Rock placed the microphone against his face. WWE recognizes The Rock's reign as ending on January 31, 1999, when the following match aired on tape delay.	
44	Mankind	January 26, 1999	Halftime Heat	Tucson, AZ	2	20	15	This was an Empty Arena match that aired on tape delay as a special during halftime of Super Bowl XXXIII on January 31, 1999, the date WWE recognizes as the beginning of Mankind's reign.	
45	The Rock	February 15, 1999	Raw	Birmingham, AL	3	41	41	This was a ladder match.	
46	"Stone Cold" Steve Austin	March 28, 1999	WrestleMania XV	Philadelphia, PA	3	56	56	This was a no disqualification match with Mankind as the guest referee.	
47	The Undertaker	May 23, 1999	Over the Edge	Kansas City, MO	3	36	36	Both Vince McMahon and Shane McMahon were the guest referees. If "Stone Cold" Steve Austin had been disqualified, he would have lost the championship.	
48	"Stone Cold" Steve Austin	June 28, 1999	Raw	Charlotte, NC	4	55	55	If The Undertaker had been disqualified, he would have lost the championship.	
49	Mankind	August 22, 1999	SummerSlam	Minneapolis, MN	3	1	1	This was a triple threat match also involving Triple H. Jesse Ventura was the guest referee.	
50	Triple H	August 23, 1999	Raw	Ames, IA	1	22	24	Shane McMahon was the guest referee. WWE recognizes Triple H's reign as ending on September 16, 1999, when the following episode aired on tape delay.	
51	Vince McMahon	September 14, 1999	SmackDown!	Paradise, NV	1	6	4	Shane McMahon was the guest referee. WWE recognizes Vince's reign as beginning on September 16, 1999, when the episode aired on tape delay.	
—	Vacated	September 20, 1999	Raw	Houston, TX	—	—	—	Vince McMahon voluntarily vacated the title.	
52	Triple H	September 26, 1999	Unforgiven	Charlotte, NC	2	49	49	This was a six-man elimination match for the vacant title, also involving Big Show, The British Bulldog, Kane, Mankind, and The Rock. "Stone Cold" Steve Austin was the outside enforcer.	
53	Big Show	November 14, 1999	Survivor Series	Detroit, MI	1	50	50	This was a triple threat match also involving The Rock. Big Show replaced "Stone Cold" Steve Austin, who had been (in storyline) run over by a car earlier in the night.	
54	Triple H	January 3, 2000	Raw	Miami, FL	3	118	117		
55	The Rock	April 30, 2000	Backlash	Washington, D.C.	4	21	20	Shane McMahon was the guest referee.	
56	Triple H	May 21, 2000	Judgment Day	Louisville, KY	4	35	34	This was a 60-minute Iron Man match which Triple H won 6–5. Shawn Michaels was the guest referee.	
57	The Rock	June 25, 2000	King of the Ring	Boston, MA	5	119	118	This was a six-man tag team match with The Rock, Kane, and The Undertaker vs. Triple H, Shane McMahon, and Vince McMahon. The pre-match stipulation stated that if The Rock, Kane, or Undertaker scored the fall, that individual would win the title. The Rock pinned Vince to win Triple H's title.	
58	Kurt Angle	October 22, 2000	No Mercy	Albany, NY	1	126	125	This was a no disqualification match.	
59	The Rock	February 25, 2001	No Way Out	Paradise, NV	6	35	34	In March 2001, the WWF acquired World Championship Wrestling (WCW). The WCW World Heavyweight Championship, which was referred to as simply the WCW Championship in the WWF, subsequently became a concurrently active world title, which was later renamed as the World Championship in November 2001.	
60	"Stone Cold" Steve Austin	April 1, 2001	WrestleMania X-Seven	Houston, TX	5	175	175	This was a no disqualification match.	
61	Kurt Angle	September 23, 2001	Unforgiven	Pittsburgh, PA	2	15	14		
62	"Stone Cold" Steve Austin	October 8, 2001	Raw	Indianapolis, IN	6	62	61		
63	Chris Jericho	December 9, 2001	Vengeance	San Diego, CA	1	98	97	Jericho had defeated The Rock for the (WCW) World Championship earlier the same night. By defeating "Stone Cold" Steve Austin for the WWF Championship, Jericho unified both titles. The (WCW) World Championship was then retired and the WWF Championship became known as the Undisputed WWF Championship.	
64	Triple H	March 17, 2002	WrestleMania X8	Toronto, ON, Canada	5	35	34	In late March 2002, WWF's roster was split into two brands, with most championships assigned to be exclusive to a specific brand. The Undisputed WWF Championship remained non-exclusive at this time.	
65	Hollywood Hulk Hogan	April 21, 2002	Backlash	Kansas City, MO	6	28	28	After the WWF was renamed World Wrestling Entertainment (WWE) due to a lawsuit by the World Wide Fund for Nature on May 6, 2002, the title was also renamed: Undisputed WWE Championship and then WWE Undisputed Championship.	
World Wrestling Entertainment (WWE)
66	The Undertaker	May 19, 2002	Judgment Day	Nashville, TN	4	63	62		
67	The Rock	July 21, 2002	Vengeance	Detroit, MI	7	35	34	This was a triple threat match also involving Kurt Angle, who The Rock pinned.	
68	Brock Lesnar	August 25, 2002	SummerSlam	Uniondale, NY	1	84	83	The following night, Lesnar signed a deal to become exclusive to SmackDown, also making the championship exclusive to the brand. The World Heavyweight Championship was then created for the Raw brand and on September 2, 2002, the WWE Undisputed Championship was truncated to WWE Championship.	
WWE: SmackDown
69	Big Show	November 17, 2002	Survivor Series	New York, NY	2	28	27		
70	Kurt Angle	December 15, 2002	Armageddon	Sunrise, FL	3	105	104		
71	Brock Lesnar	March 30, 2003	WrestleMania XIX	Seattle, WA	2	119	118	Had Angle been counted out or disqualified, he would have lost the title.	
72	Kurt Angle	July 27, 2003	Vengeance	Denver, CO	4	51	52	This was a triple threat match also involving Big Show. WWE recognizes Angle's reign as ending on September 18, 2003, when the following episode aired on tape delay.	
73	Brock Lesnar	September 16, 2003	SmackDown!	Raleigh, NC	3	152	150	This was a 60-minute Iron Man match, which Lesnar won 5–4. WWE recognizes Lesnar's reign as beginning on September 18, 2003, when the episode aired on tape delay.	
74	Eddie Guerrero	February 15, 2004	No Way Out	Daly City, CA	1	133	132		
75	John "Bradshaw" Layfield	June 27, 2004	The Great American Bash	Norfolk, VA	1	280	279	This was a Texas bullrope match.	
76	John Cena	April 3, 2005	WrestleMania 21	Los Angeles, CA	1	280	280	The title became exclusive to the Raw brand following the 2005 draft.	
WWE: Raw
77	Edge	January 8, 2006	New Year's Revolution	Albany, NY	1	21	20	This was Edge's Money in the Bank cash-in match.	
78	John Cena	January 29, 2006	Royal Rumble	Miami, FL	2	133	133		
79	Rob Van Dam	June 11, 2006	ECW One Night Stand	New York, NY	1	22	21	This was Van Dam's Money in the Bank cash-in match, contested as an Extreme Rules match. Due to Van Dam's status as an ECW wrestler, which became a third brand that year, the ECW World Heavyweight Championship of the former Extreme Championship Wrestling promotion was subsequently reactivated for the brand and awarded to Van Dam (WWE had acquired the assets of the former promotion in 2003 and then relaunched it as one of their brands).	
WWE: ECW
80	Edge	July 3, 2006	Raw	Philadelphia, PA	2	76	75	This was a triple threat match also involving John Cena. The title became exclusive to the Raw brand due to Edge's status as a Raw wrestler.	
WWE: Raw
81	John Cena	September 17, 2006	Unforgiven	Toronto, ON, Canada	3	380	380	This was a Tables, Ladders and Chairs match. Had John Cena lost, he would have had to leave the Raw brand.	
—	Vacated	October 2, 2007	ECW	Dayton, OH	—	—	—	The title was vacated after John Cena suffered an injury.	
82	Randy Orton	October 7, 2007	No Mercy	Rosemont, IL	1	<1	<1	Orton was originally scheduled to challenge John Cena for the title, but due to Cena vacating it, Orton was awarded the title and had to immediately defend it against Triple H.	
83	Triple H	October 7, 2007	No Mercy	Rosemont, IL	6	<1	<1	After winning the championship, Triple H had to defend the title the same night, first in a previously scheduled match against Umaga and then against Randy Orton, who invoked his rematch clause.	
84	Randy Orton	October 7, 2007	No Mercy	Rosemont, IL	2	203	202	This was a Last Man Standing match.	
85	Triple H	April 27, 2008	Backlash	Baltimore, MD	7	210	209	This was a four-way elimination match also involving John Cena and John "Bradshaw" Layfield. The title became exclusive to the SmackDown brand following the 2008 draft.	
WWE: SmackDown
86	Edge	November 23, 2008	Survivor Series	Boston, MA	3	21	20	This was a triple threat match also involving Vladimir Kozlov. Jeff Hardy had originally been scheduled to take part in the match, but he did not participate after being (in storyline) attacked prior to the event. Triple H and Kozlov started the match before Edge was revealed as Hardy's surprise replacement.	
87	Jeff Hardy	December 14, 2008	Armageddon	Buffalo, NY	1	42	41	This was a triple threat match also involving Triple H.	
88	Edge	January 25, 2009	Royal Rumble	Detroit, MI	4	21	20	This was a no disqualification match.	
89	Triple H	February 15, 2009	No Way Out	Seattle, WA	8	70	69	This was an Elimination Chamber match also involving Big Show, Jeff Hardy, The Undertaker, and Vladimir Kozlov. Triple H lastly eliminated Undertaker to win the title. The title became exclusive to the Raw brand following the 2009 draft.	
WWE: Raw
90	Randy Orton	April 26, 2009	Backlash	Providence, RI	3	42	41	This was a six-man tag team match with The Legacy (Randy Orton, Cody Rhodes, and Ted DiBiase) against Batista, Triple H, and Shane McMahon. Orton pinned Triple H to win the title.	
91	Batista	June 7, 2009	Extreme Rules	New Orleans, LA	1	2	1	This was a steel cage match.	
—	Vacated	June 9, 2009	—	—	—	—	—	The title was vacated after Batista suffered a torn left bicep.	
92	Randy Orton	June 15, 2009	Raw	Charlotte, NC	4	90	89	This was a fatal four-way match for the vacant title also involving Big Show, John Cena, and Triple H.	
93	John Cena	September 13, 2009	Breaking Point	Montreal, QC, Canada	4	21	21	This was an "I Quit" match. Had anyone interfered on Randy Orton's behalf, he would have forfeited the title.	
94	Randy Orton	October 4, 2009	Hell in a Cell	Newark, NJ	5	21	20	This was a Hell in a Cell match.	
95	John Cena	October 25, 2009	Bragging Rights	Pittsburgh, PA	5	49	49	This was a 60-minute Anything Goes Iron Man match in which Cena won 6–5. Had Cena lost, he would have had to leave the Raw brand.	
96	Sheamus	December 13, 2009	TLC: Tables, Ladders & Chairs	San Antonio, TX	1	70	69	This was a tables match.	
97	John Cena	February 21, 2010	Elimination Chamber	St. Louis, MO	6	<1	<1	This was an Elimination Chamber match also involving Kofi Kingston, Randy Orton, Ted DiBiase Jr., and Triple H. Cena lastly eliminated Triple H to win the title.	
98	Batista	February 21, 2010	Elimination Chamber	St. Louis, MO	2	35	35		
99	John Cena	March 28, 2010	WrestleMania XXVI	Glendale, AZ	7	84	84		
100	Sheamus	June 20, 2010	Fatal 4-Way	Uniondale, NY	2	91	90	This was a fatal four-way match also involving Edge and Randy Orton.	
101	Randy Orton	September 19, 2010	Night of Champions	Rosemont, IL	6	64	63	This was a six-pack elimination challenge also involving Chris Jericho, Edge, John Cena, and Wade Barrett, who decided to cash-in his title shot due to winning the first season of NXT.	
102	The Miz	November 22, 2010	Raw	Orlando, FL	1	160	159	This was Miz's Money in the Bank cash-in match.	
103	John Cena	May 1, 2011	Extreme Rules	Tampa, FL	8	77	77	This was a triple threat steel cage match also involving John Morrison.	
104	CM Punk	July 17, 2011	Money in the Bank	Rosemont, IL	1	28	28	Punk (kayfabe) left WWE the day after with the championship, but returned on the July 25, 2011, episode of Raw and his reign was deemed to continue through this period.	
—	Vacated	July 18, 2011	Raw	Green Bay, WI	—	—	—	The title was vacated due to CM Punk "leaving" WWE. This vacancy is no longer recognized due to Punk's return on the July 25, 2011, episode of Raw.	
105	Rey Mysterio	July 25, 2011	Raw	Hampton, VA	1	<1	<1	Defeated The Miz in a tournament final to crown a new champion. CM Punk was also simultaneously recognized as WWE Champion.	
106	John Cena	July 25, 2011	Raw	Hampton, VA	9	20	20	As the former champion prior to CM Punk, Cena was granted a title match against Rey Mysterio by Triple H. Punk was also simultaneously recognized as WWE Champion.	
†	CM Punk	August 14, 2011	SummerSlam	Los Angeles, CA	1	—	—	Punk defeated John Cena in a match to determine the undisputed champion. Triple H was the guest referee. This is considered a continuation of Punk's first reign.	
107	Alberto Del Rio	August 14, 2011	SummerSlam	Los Angeles, CA	1	35	34	This was Del Rio's Money in the Bank cash-in match. On August 29, 2011, the first brand split ended, allowing the WWE Champion to appear on both Raw and SmackDown.	
WWE (unbranded)
108	John Cena	September 18, 2011	Night of Champions	Buffalo, NY	10	14	14		
109	Alberto Del Rio	October 2, 2011	Hell in a Cell	New Orleans, LA	2	49	48	This was a triple threat Hell in a Cell match also involving CM Punk, who Del Rio pinned.	
110	CM Punk	November 20, 2011	Survivor Series	New York, NY	2	434	434		
111	The Rock	January 27, 2013	Royal Rumble	Phoenix, AZ	8	70	69	CM Punk had initially won, but the match was restarted by Vince McMahon due to interference by The Shield (Dean Ambrose, Roman Reigns, and Seth Rollins).	
112	John Cena	April 7, 2013	WrestleMania 29	East Rutherford, NJ	11	133	133		
113	Daniel Bryan	August 18, 2013	SummerSlam	Los Angeles, CA	1	<1	<1	Triple H was the guest referee.	
114	Randy Orton	August 18, 2013	SummerSlam	Los Angeles, CA	7	28	28	This was Orton's Money in the Bank cash-in match. Triple H was the guest referee.	
115	Daniel Bryan	September 15, 2013	Night of Champions	Detroit, MI	2	1	<1		
—	Vacated	September 16, 2013	Raw	Cleveland, OH	—	—	—	The title was vacated after a controversial finish when Daniel Bryan defeated Randy Orton to win the title.	
116	Randy Orton	October 27, 2013	Hell in a Cell	Miami, FL	8	161	160	Orton defeated Daniel Bryan in a Hell in a Cell match to win the vacant title with Shawn Michaels as the guest referee. On December 15, 2013, at TLC: Tables, Ladders & Chairs, Orton defeated John Cena in a Tables, Ladders and Chairs match to unify the World Heavyweight Championship with the WWE Championship. The World Heavyweight Championship was then retired and the WWE Championship became known as the WWE World Heavyweight Championship.	
117	Daniel Bryan	April 6, 2014	WrestleMania XXX	New Orleans, LA	3	64	63	This was a triple threat match also involving Batista, who Bryan submitted to win the title.	
—	Vacated	June 9, 2014	Raw	Minneapolis, MN	—	—	—	Daniel Bryan was stripped of the title due to a neck injury.	
118	John Cena	June 29, 2014	Money in the Bank	Boston, MA	12	49	49	This was an eight-man ladder match for the vacant title also involving Alberto Del Rio, Bray Wyatt, Cesaro, Kane, Randy Orton, Roman Reigns, and Sheamus.	
119	Brock Lesnar	August 17, 2014	SummerSlam	Los Angeles, CA	4	224	223		
120	Seth Rollins	March 29, 2015	WrestleMania 31	Santa Clara, CA	1	221	219	This was Rollins's Money in the Bank cash-in match, which was originally a singles match between Brock Lesnar and Roman Reigns, but converted into a triple threat match after Rollins cashed-in his contract mid-match, with Rollins pinning Reigns to win the title.	
—	Vacated	November 5, 2015	—	—	—	—	—	The title was vacated after Seth Rollins suffered a torn ACL, MCL, and a damaged meniscus at a live event in Dublin, Ireland.	
121	Roman Reigns	November 22, 2015	Survivor Series	Atlanta, GA	1	<1	<1	Defeated Dean Ambrose in a tournament final to win the vacant title.	
122	Sheamus	November 22, 2015	Survivor Series	Atlanta, GA	3	22	22	This was Sheamus's Money in the Bank cash-in match.	
123	Roman Reigns	December 14, 2015	Raw	Philadelphia, PA	2	41	40	This was a title vs. career match.	
124	Triple H	January 24, 2016	Royal Rumble	Orlando, FL	9	70	69	Roman Reigns defended the title in the 30-man Royal Rumble match, entering at number one. Triple H eliminated Reigns before lastly eliminating Dean Ambrose to win the title.	
125	Roman Reigns	April 3, 2016	WrestleMania 32	Arlington, TX	3	77	76		
126	Seth Rollins	June 19, 2016	Money in the Bank	Paradise, NV	2	<1	<1		
127	Dean Ambrose	June 19, 2016	Money in the Bank	Paradise, NV	1	84	83	This was Ambrose's Money in the Bank cash-in match. The title's name was truncated to WWE Championship. The title then became exclusive to the SmackDown brand following the 2016 draft. After the creation of the WWE Universal Championship for the Raw brand, the WWE Championship's name was changed to WWE World Championship.	
WWE: SmackDown
128	AJ Styles	September 11, 2016	Backlash	Richmond, VA	1	140	140	In December 2016, the title's name reverted to WWE Championship.	
129	John Cena	January 29, 2017	Royal Rumble	San Antonio, TX	13	14	14		
130	Bray Wyatt	February 12, 2017	Elimination Chamber	Phoenix, AZ	1	49	48	This was an Elimination Chamber match also involving AJ Styles, Baron Corbin, Dean Ambrose, and The Miz. Wyatt eliminated Cena before lastly eliminating Styles to win the title.	
131	Randy Orton	April 2, 2017	WrestleMania 33	Orlando, FL	9	49	49		
132	Jinder Mahal	May 21, 2017	Backlash	Rosemont, IL	1	170	169		
133	AJ Styles	November 7, 2017	SmackDown	Manchester, England	2	371	371		
134	Daniel Bryan	November 13, 2018	SmackDown	St. Louis, MO	4	145	144		
135	Kofi Kingston	April 7, 2019	WrestleMania 35	East Rutherford, NJ	1	180	180		
136	Brock Lesnar	October 4, 2019	SmackDown's 20th Anniversary	Los Angeles, CA	5	173	184	On the November 1, 2019, episode of SmackDown, Lesnar quit SmackDown and went to Raw, taking the title with him.	
WWE: Raw
137	Drew McIntyre	March 25, 2020	WrestleMania 36; Part 2	Orlando, FL	1	214	202	The match was taped on March 25, according to McIntyre's memoir, A Chosen Destiny: My Story. WWE recognizes this reign as beginning on April 5, 2020, when the match aired on tape delay.	
138	Randy Orton	October 25, 2020	Hell in a Cell	Orlando, FL	10	22	22	This was a Hell in a Cell match.	
139	Drew McIntyre	November 16, 2020	Raw	Orlando, FL	2	97	96	This was a no disqualification, no countout match.	
140	The Miz	February 21, 2021	Elimination Chamber	St. Petersburg, FL	2	8	8	This was Miz's Money in the Bank cash-in match.	
141	Bobby Lashley	March 1, 2021	Raw	St. Petersburg, FL	1	196	195	This was a lumberjack match.	
142	Big E	September 13, 2021	Raw	Boston, MA	1	110	110	This was Big E's Money in the Bank cash-in match.	
143	Brock Lesnar	January 1, 2022	Day 1	Atlanta, GA	6	28	27	This was a fatal five-way match also involving Bobby Lashley, Kevin Owens, and Seth Rollins.	
144	Bobby Lashley	January 29, 2022	Royal Rumble	St. Louis, MO	2	21	20		
145	Brock Lesnar	February 19, 2022	Elimination Chamber	Jeddah, Saudi Arabia	7	43	43	This was an Elimination Chamber match also involving AJ Styles, Austin Theory, Riddle, and Seth Rollins. Lesnar lastly eliminated Theory to win the title.	
146	Roman Reigns	April 3, 2022	WrestleMania 38; Night 2	Arlington, TX	4	735	734	This was a Winner Takes All match in which Reigns defended the WWE Universal Championship. Both titles together were subsequently referred to as the Undisputed WWE Universal Championship and defended across both brands. In April 2023, a new World Heavyweight Championship was created and designated to Raw after the Undisputed WWE Universal Championship became exclusive to SmackDown following the 2023 draft.	
WWE: SmackDown
147	Cody Rhodes	April 7, 2024	WrestleMania XL; Night 2	Philadelphia, PA	1	378	378	This was a Bloodline Rules match. The WWE Universal Championship was retired with the WWE Championship subsequently referred to as the Undisputed WWE Championship. (Note: WWE's official title history originally recognized Cody Rhodes as both the WWE and Universal champion until he lost the title to John Cena the following year, after which, the title history was amended to retire the Universal title upon Roman Reigns's loss to Rhodes at WrestleMania XL, with Reigns officially recognized as the final Universal Champion.) Rhodes was a member of the Raw brand and transferred to SmackDown after winning the title.	
148	John Cena	April 20, 2025	WrestleMania 41; Night 2	Paradise, NV	14	105	104		
149	Cody Rhodes	August 3, 2025	SummerSlam; Night 2	East Rutherford, NJ	2	159	159	This was a Street Fight.	
150	Drew McIntyre	January 9, 2026	SmackDown	Berlin, Germany	3	56	55	This was a Three Stages of Hell match, where the three stages were a standard singles match, a Falls Count Anywhere match, and a Steel Cage match; McIntyre won the first and third falls.	
151	Cody Rhodes	March 6, 2026	SmackDown	Portland, OR	3	113	112		
152	Sami Zayn	June 27, 2026	Night of Champions	Riyadh, Saudi Arabia	1	9	9	This was a triple threat match also involving Gunther.	
153	CM Punk	July 6, 2026	Raw	Rosemont, IL	3	67	66	Punk was a member of the Raw brand and transferred to SmackDown after winning the title.	
154	Sami Zayn	September 11, 2026	SmackDown	Mexico City, Mexico	2	71+	71+		

== Combined reigns ==
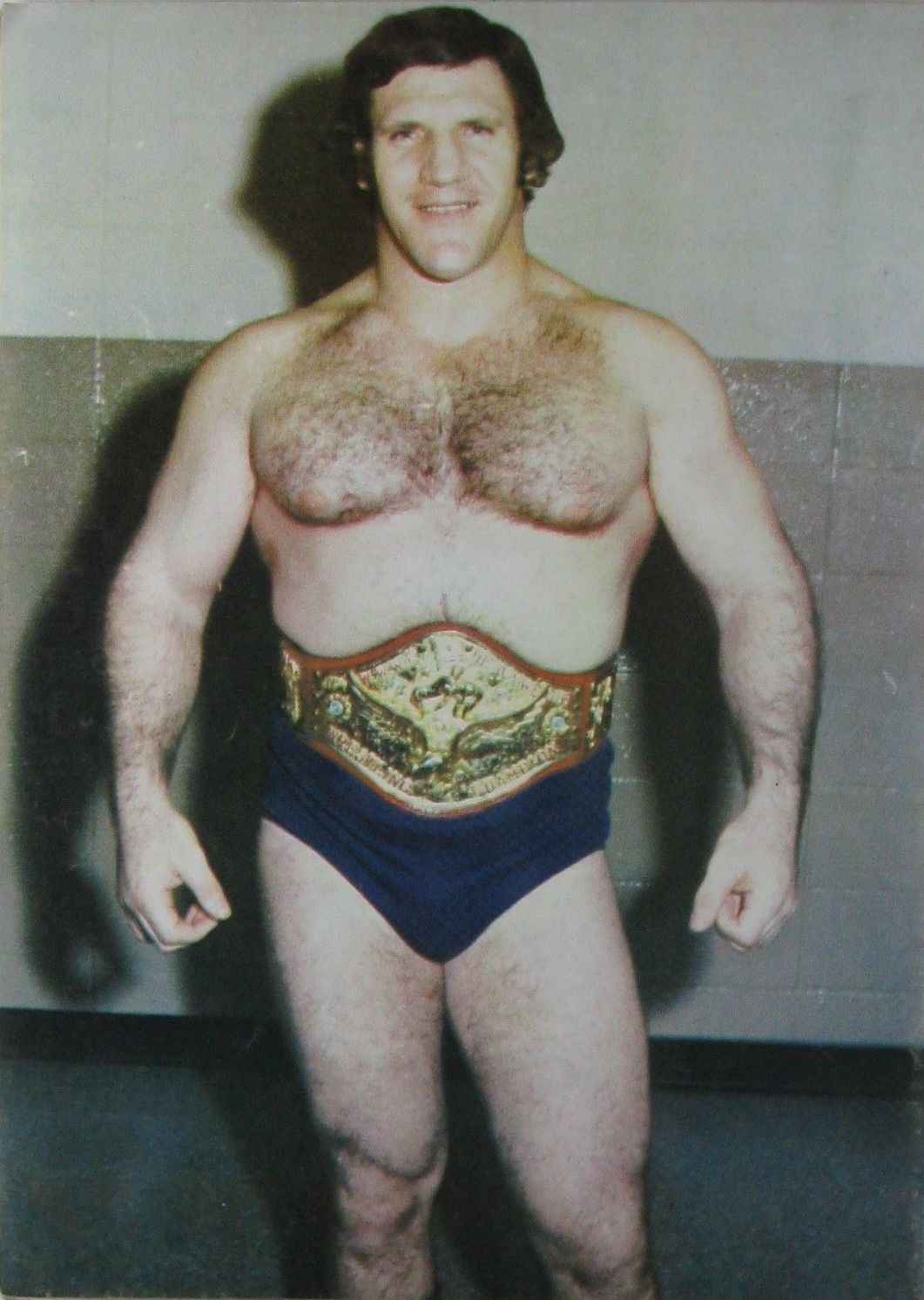
Two-time champion Bruno Sammartino, whose first reign is the longest reign at 2,803 days. He also has the longest combined reign at 4,040 days.

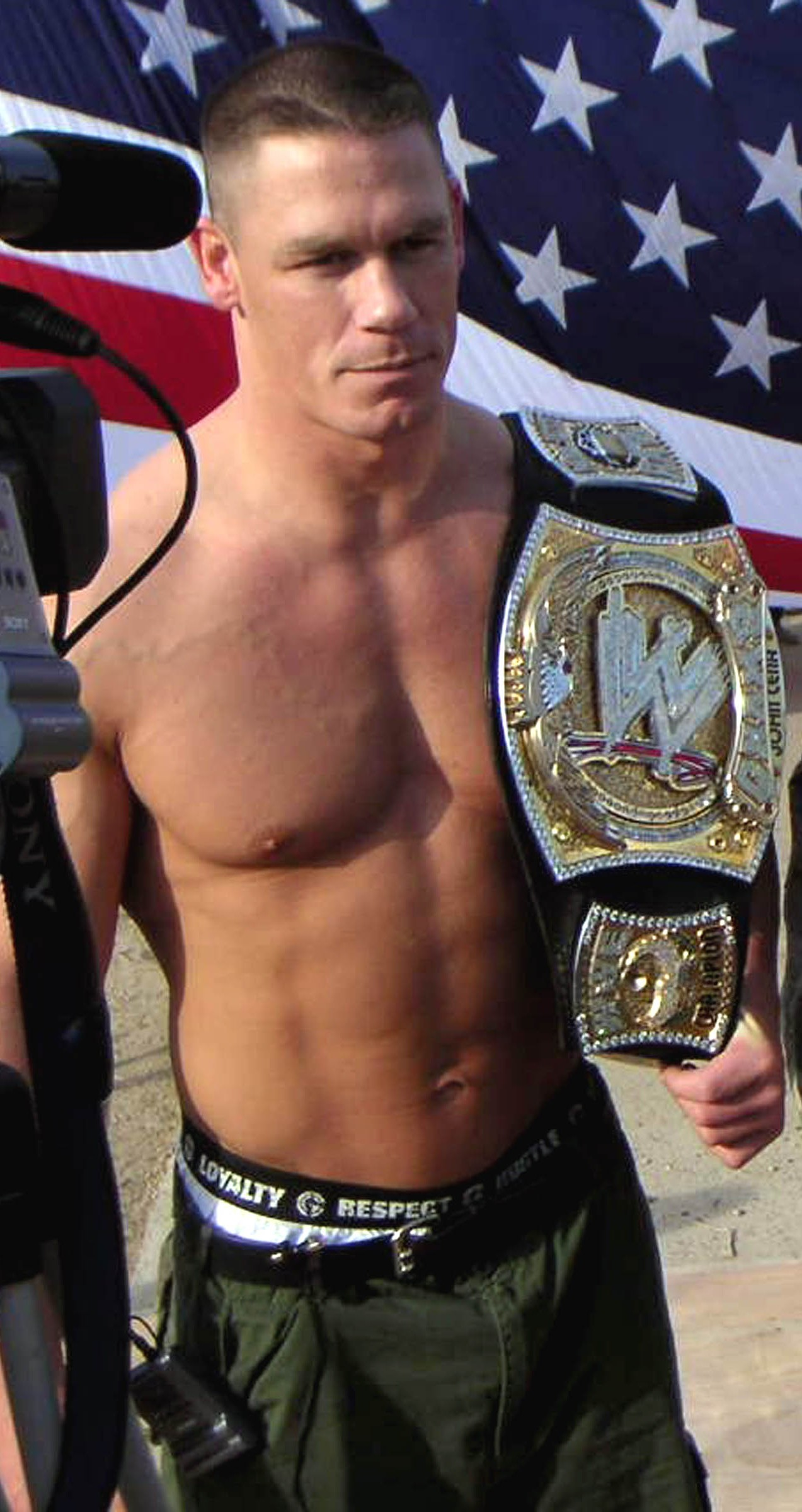
Record 14-time champion John Cena

As of November 21, 2026

Key
Rec	Recognized by the promotion
†	Current champion; reign changing daily
<1	Reign was less than a day

Rank	Champion	No. of reigns	Combined days	
Rank	Champion	No. of reigns	Actual	Recognized by WWE
1	Bruno Sammartino	2	4,040	
2	Hulk Hogan	6	2,185	
3	Bob Backlund	2	2,121	2,138
4	John Cena	14	1,360	
5	Pedro Morales	1	1,027	
6	Roman Reigns	4	853	855
7	Brock Lesnar	7	823	828
8	Randy Orton	10	680	685
9	Bret Hart	5	654	
10	Cody Rhodes	3	650	
11	Triple H	9	609	605
12	"Stone Cold" Steve Austin	6	529	528
12	CM Punk	3	529	
14	Randy Savage	2	520	
15	AJ Styles	2	511	
16	Shawn Michaels	3	396	
17	The Rock	8	367	377
17	Drew McIntyre	3	367	357
19	Diesel	1	358	
20	Kurt Angle	4	297	295
21	"Superstar" Billy Graham	1	296	
22	Ultimate Warrior	1	293	
23	Yokozuna	2	280	
23	John "Bradshaw" Layfield	1	280	279
25	The Undertaker	4	238	237
26	Seth Rollins	2	221	219
27	Bobby Lashley	2	217	215
28	Daniel Bryan	4	210	209
29	Sheamus	3	183	182
30	Kofi Kingston	1	180	
31	Jinder Mahal	1	170	169
32	The Miz	2	168	167
33	Edge	4	139	135
34	Eddie Guerrero	1	133	132
35	Ric Flair	2	118	
36	Big E	1	110	
37	Chris Jericho	1	98	97
38	Sycho Sid	2	97	
39	Alberto Del Rio	2	84	82
39	Dean Ambrose	1	84	83
41	Sami Zayn †	2	80+	
42	Big Show	2	78	77
43	Sgt. Slaughter	1	64	
44	Bray Wyatt	1	49	48
45	Mankind	3	47	36
46	Buddy Rogers	1	46	21
47	Jeff Hardy	1	42	41
48	Batista	2	37	36
49	The Iron Sheik	1	28	
50	Rob Van Dam	1	22	21
51	Ivan Koloff	1	21	
52	Stan Stasiak	1	9	
—	Ted DiBiase	—	8	—
—	Antonio Inoki	—	6	—
53	Vince McMahon	1	6	4
54	Kane	1	1	
55	André the Giant	1	<1	
55	Rey Mysterio	1	<1	

== See also ==
- World championships in WWE
