= List of WWE Intercontinental Champions =

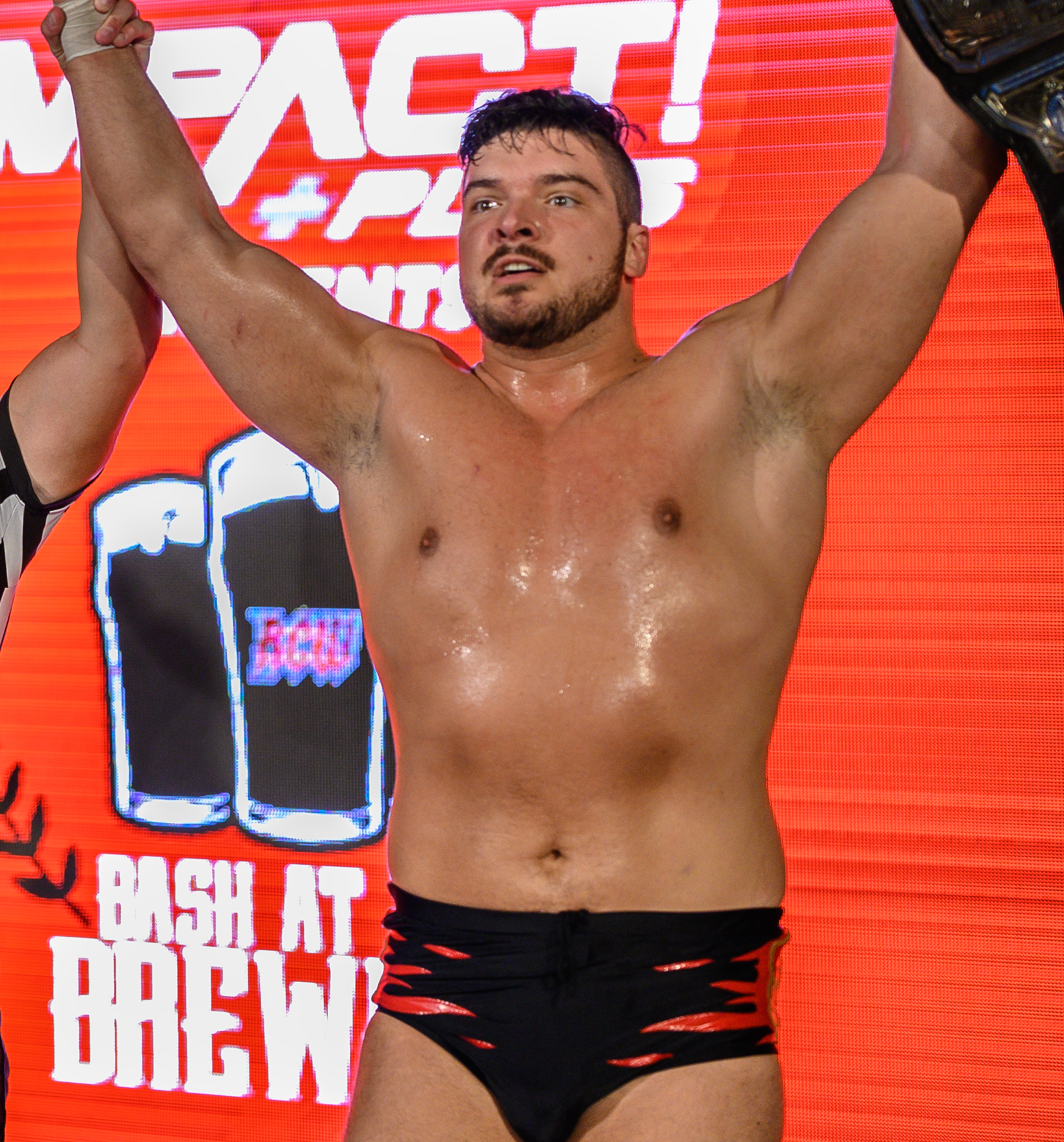
Current champion Ethan Page

The WWE Intercontinental Championship is a professional wrestling championship contested in and owned by the American promotion WWE on the Raw brand. The title was introduced into the World Wrestling Federation (WWF, now WWE) in 1979. Pat Patterson, holder of the WWE North American Heavyweight Championship, was awarded the title (with the kayfabe explanation that he won a tournament in Rio de Janeiro, Brazil and unified the North American and South American titles).

The Intercontinental Championship has been called the second most important championship in the company, after the WWE Championship. It has been active in WWE for the second-longest period, but is the third-oldest active title overall, behind the WWE Championship (1963) and the United States Championship (1974), the latter of which was acquired from World Championship Wrestling (WCW) in 2001. In 2002, the WWF was renamed World Wrestling Entertainment (WWE), and the championship was renamed accordingly. Following the 2023 WWE Draft, the title became exclusive to Raw.

Overall, there have been 193 reigns among 96 different champions. Chris Jericho holds the record for the most reigns with nine. Ethan Page is the current champion in his first reign. He won the title by defeating Chad Gable on the November 2, 2026, episode of Raw in Brooklyn, New York.

== Title history ==
=== Names ===
Name	Years
WWF Intercontinental Heavyweight Championship	September 1, 1979 – 1988
WWF Intercontinental Championship	1988 – May 6, 2002
WWE Intercontinental Championship	May 6, 2002 – present

=== Reigns ===
As of November 22, 2026.

Key
No.	Overall reign number
Reign	Reign number for the specific champion
Days	Number of days held
Days recog.	Number of days held recognized by the promotion
†	Championship change is unrecognized by the promotion
<1	Reign lasted less than a day
+	Current reign is changing daily

No.	Champion	Championship change			Reign statistics			Notes	Ref.
No.	Champion	Date	Event	Location	Reign	Days	Days recog.	Notes	Ref.
National Wrestling Alliance: World Wrestling Federation (WWF)
1	Pat Patterson	September 1, 1979	—	Rio de Janeiro, Brazil	1	233	232	Patterson became the first champion after defeating Ted DiBiase for the WWF North American Heavyweight Championship on June 19, 1979 in Allentown, PA and Johnny Rodz in a South American Heavyweight Championship tournament final in Rio de Janeiro, Brazil, subsequently unifying the North American Heavyweight Championship and the South American Heavyweight Championship to create the WWF Intercontinental Heavyweight Championship. The new title was first mentioned on Championship Wrestling on August 22, which aired on August 25, in an interview after Patterson defeated Johnny Rivera.	
2	Ken Patera	April 21, 1980	WWF on MSG Network	New York, NY	1	231	230		
3	Pedro Morales	December 8, 1980	WWF	New York, NY	1	194	193		
4	Don Muraco	June 20, 1981	WWF on PRISM Network	Philadelphia, PA	1	156	155		
5	Pedro Morales	November 23, 1981	WWF on MSG Network	New York, NY	2	425	424		
6	Don Muraco	January 22, 1983	WWF on MSG Network	New York, NY	2	385	384	During his reign, the WWF withdrew from the NWA.	
World Wrestling Federation (WWF)
7	Tito Santana	February 11, 1984	WWF	Boston, MA	1	226	225		
8	Greg Valentine	September 24, 1984	Maple Leaf Wrestling	London, ON, Canada	1	285	284	Aired on tape delay on October 13, 1984.	
9	Tito Santana	July 6, 1985	House show	Baltimore, MD	2	217	216	This was a steel cage match.	
10	Randy Savage	February 8, 1986	WWF on NESN	Boston, MA	1	414	414		
11	Ricky Steamboat	March 29, 1987	WrestleMania III	Pontiac, MI	1	65	64		
12	The Honky Tonk Man	June 2, 1987	Superstars of Wrestling	Buffalo, NY	1	454	453	Aired on tape delay on June 13, 1987.	
13	Ultimate Warrior	August 29, 1988	SummerSlam	New York, NY	1	216	215		
14	Rick Rude	April 2, 1989	WrestleMania V	Atlantic City, NJ	1	148	147		
15	Ultimate Warrior	August 28, 1989	SummerSlam	East Rutherford, NJ	2	218	215		
—	Vacated	April 3, 1990	Wrestling Challenge	Syracuse, NY	—	—	—	Warrior relinquished the title after winning the WWF Championship in order to focus on defending the latter. WWE recognizes the title as being vacated on April 1, 1990 at WrestleMania VI.	
16	Mr. Perfect	April 23, 1990	Superstars of Wrestling	Austin, TX	1	126	125	Defeated Tito Santana in a tournament final for the vacant title. Aired on tape delay on May 19, 1990.	
17	The Texas Tornado	August 27, 1990	SummerSlam	Philadelphia, PA	1	84	83		
18	Mr. Perfect	November 19, 1990	Superstars of Wrestling	Rochester, NY	2	280	279	Aired on tape delay on December 15, 1990.	
19	Bret Hart	August 26, 1991	SummerSlam	New York, NY	1	144	143		
20	The Mountie	January 17, 1992	House show	Springfield, MA	1	2	1		
21	Roddy Piper	January 19, 1992	Royal Rumble	Albany, NY	1	77	76		
22	Bret Hart	April 5, 1992	WrestleMania VIII	Indianapolis, IN	2	146	145		
23	The British Bulldog	August 29, 1992	SummerSlam	London, England	1	59	58		
24	Shawn Michaels	October 27, 1992	Saturday Night's Main Event XXXI	Terre Haute, IN	1	202	201	Aired on tape delay on November 14, 1992.	
25	Marty Jannetty	May 17, 1993	Raw	New York, NY	1	20	19		
26	Shawn Michaels	June 6, 1993	House show	Albany, NY	2	113	112		
—	Vacated	September 27, 1993	—	—	—	—	—	Shawn Michaels was stripped of the title for failing to defend it within 30 days. In reality, Michaels was suspended for testing positive for steroids.	
27	Razor Ramon	September 27, 1993	Raw	New Haven, CT	1	198	197	Ramon and Rick Martel were the final two participants in a battle royal. Ramon then defeated Martel for the vacant title; The match aired on tape delay on October 11, 1993. However, Shawn Michaels returned in November 1993, claiming to be the legitimate champion as nobody defeated him. Ramon went on to defeat Michaels in a ladder match on March 20, 1994 at WrestleMania X.	
28	Diesel	April 13, 1994	Superstars	Rochester, NY	1	138	137	Aired on tape delay on April 30, 1994.	
29	Razor Ramon	August 29, 1994	SummerSlam	Chicago, IL	2	146	145		
30	Jeff Jarrett	January 22, 1995	Royal Rumble	Tampa, FL	1	94	93		
—	Vacated	April 26, 1995	Action Zone	Moline, IL	—	—	—	Held up when match between Jeff Jarrett and Bob "Spark Plug" Holly ended in controversy. Aired on tape delay on April 30, 1995.	
31	Jeff Jarrett	April 26, 1995	Action Zone	Moline, IL	2	23	22	Defeated Bob Holly in a rematch for the vacant title. Aired on tape delay on May 7, 1995.	
32	Razor Ramon	May 19, 1995	House show	Montreal QC, Canada	3	2	2	This was a ladder match. WWE recognizes Ramon's reign as ending on May 22, 1995.	
33	Jeff Jarrett	May 21, 1995	House show	Trois-Rivières, QC, Canada	3	63	61	WWE recognizes Jarrett's reign as beginning on May 22, 1995.	
34	Shawn Michaels	July 23, 1995	In Your House 2: The Lumberjacks	Nashville, TN	3	91	90		
35	Dean Douglas	October 22, 1995	In Your House 4: Great White North	Winnipeg, MB, Canada	1	<1	<1	Won the title by forfeit due to Shawn Michaels being attacked outside a nightclub in Syracuse, NY on October 14, 1995.	
36	Razor Ramon	October 22, 1995	In Your House 4: Great White North	Winnipeg, MB, Canada	4	91	90		
37	Goldust	January 21, 1996	Royal Rumble	Fresno, CA	1	71	63	WWE recognizes Goldust's reign as ending on March 25, 1996.	
—	Vacated	April 1, 1996	Raw	San Bernardino, CA	—	—	—	Held up when a title defense against Savio Vega ended in a no contest. Aired on tape delay on April 15, 1996.	
38	Goldust	April 1, 1996	Raw	San Bernardino, CA	2	83	82	Defeated Savio Vega in a rematch for the vacant championship. Aired on tape delay on April 22, 1996.	
39	Ahmed Johnson	June 23, 1996	King of the Ring	Milwaukee, WI	1	50	57	WWE recognizes Johnson's reign as ending on August 19, 1996.	
—	Vacated	August 12, 1996	Raw	Seattle, WA	—	—	—	Ahmed Johnson forfeited the championship after being attacked by the debuting Faarooq after winning an 11-man battle royal.	
40	Marc Mero	September 23, 1996	Raw	Hershey, PA	1	28	27	Defeated Faarooq in a tournament final for the vacant championship.	
41	Hunter Hearst Helmsley	October 21, 1996	Raw	Fort Wayne, IN	1	115	114		
42	Rocky Maivia	February 13, 1997	Raw	Lowell, MA	1	74	73		
43	Owen Hart	April 28, 1997	Raw	Omaha, NE	1	97	96		
44	"Stone Cold" Steve Austin	August 3, 1997	SummerSlam	East Rutherford, NJ	1	36	63	WWE mistakenly lists Austin's reign as lasting 63 days, ending on October 5, 1997.	
—	Vacated	September 8, 1997	—	—	—	—	—	Vacated due to a neck injury that Stone Cold Steve Austin suffered in winning the championship.	
45	Owen Hart	October 5, 1997	Badd Blood: In Your House	St. Louis, MO	2	35	34	Defeated Faarooq in a tournament final for the vacant championship.	
46	"Stone Cold" Steve Austin	November 9, 1997	Survivor Series	Montreal, QC, Canada	2	29	28		
47	The Rock	December 8, 1997	Raw	Portland, ME	2	265	264	Stone Cold Steve Austin handed the championship belt to The Rock, who was formerly known as Rocky Maivia.	
48	Triple H	August 30, 1998	SummerSlam	New York, NY	2	40	43	This was a ladder match. Triple H was formerly known as Hunter Hearst Helmsley. WWE mistakenly lists Triple H's reign as lasting 43 days, ending on October 12, 1998.	
—	Vacated	October 9, 1998	—	—	—	—	—	Vacated due to a knee injury.	
49	Ken Shamrock	October 12, 1998	Raw	Uniondale, NY	1	125	124	Defeated X-Pac in a tournament final for the vacant championship.	
50	Val Venis	February 14, 1999	St. Valentine's Day Massacre: In Your House	Memphis, TN	1	29	28	Billy Gunn was the guest referee.	
51	Road Dogg	March 15, 1999	Raw	San Jose, CA	1	14	13		
52	Goldust	March 29, 1999	Raw	East Rutherford, NJ	3	14	13		
53	The Godfather	April 12, 1999	Raw	Detroit, MI	1	43	42		
54	Jeff Jarrett	May 25, 1999	Raw	Moline, IL	4	60	53	WWE recognizes Jarrett's reign as beginning on May 31, 1999, when the episode aired on tape delay.	
55	Edge	July 24, 1999	House show	Toronto, ON, Canada	1	1	<1		
56	Jeff Jarrett	July 25, 1999	Fully Loaded	Buffalo, NY	5	2	<1	WWE recognizes Jarrett's reign as ending on July 26, 1999.	
57	D'Lo Brown	July 27, 1999	Raw	Columbus, OH	1	26	26	This was a Winner Takes All match, where Brown also defended the European Championship. Brown became the first Eurocontinental Champion. Aired on tape delay on August 2, 1999. WWE recognizes Brown's reign as beginning on July 26, 1999.	
58	Jeff Jarrett	August 22, 1999	SummerSlam	Minneapolis, MN	6	56	55	Jarrett also won the European Championship in the match to become the second Eurocontinental Champion.	
59	Chyna	October 17, 1999	No Mercy	Cleveland, OH	1	56	55	This was a Good Housekeeping match.	
60	Chris Jericho	December 12, 1999	Armageddon	Sunrise, FL	1	22	21		
†	Chris Jericho and Chyna	January 3, 2000	Raw	Miami, FL	1	20	—	On December 28, 1999 (aired December 30, 1999) on SmackDown!, a title match between Chyna and Jericho ended in a double pinfall; as a result they were recognized as co-champions. WWE does not recognize this period as an official reign but as a vacancy.	
61	Chris Jericho	January 23, 2000	Royal Rumble	New York, NY	2	35	34	Jericho defeated Chyna and Hardcore Holly in a triple threat match to become undisputed champion.	
62	Kurt Angle	February 27, 2000	No Way Out	Hartford, CT	1	35	34	Earlier that month, Angle had also won the European Championship. This win made Angle the third and final Eurocontinental Champion.	
63	Chris Benoit	April 2, 2000	WrestleMania 2000	Anaheim, CA	1	30	49	This was a two-fall triple threat match, also involving Chris Jericho, in which Kurt Angle defended both championships. The person to get the first fall won the Intercontinental Championship and the person to score the second fall won the European Championship; Benoit scored the first fall to win the Intercontinental Championship. WWE recognizes Benoit's reign as ending on May 4, 2000, when the following episode aired on tape delay. They incorrectly list his reign as ending on May 22, 2000, and lasting 49 days.	
64	Chris Jericho	May 2, 2000	SmackDown!	Richmond, VA	3	6	4	WWE recognizes Jericho's reign as beginning on May 4, 2000, when the episode aired on tape delay.	
65	Chris Benoit	May 8, 2000	Raw	Uniondale, NY	2	43	42	Triple H was the special outside enforcer	
66	Rikishi	June 20, 2000	SmackDown!	Memphis, TN	1	14	13	WWE recognizes Rikishi's reign as beginning on June 22, 2000 and ending on July 6, 2000, both episodes of which aired on tape delay.	
67	Val Venis	July 4, 2000	SmackDown!	Sunrise, FL	2	54	51	WWE recognizes Venis's reign as beginning on July 6, 2000, when the episode aired on tape delay.	
68	Chyna	August 27, 2000	SummerSlam	Raleigh, NC	2	8	7	Won the title in a mixed tag team match that pitted Chyna and Eddie Guerrero against Val Venis and Trish Stratus; Chyna pinned Trish to win Venis' title.	
69	Eddie Guerrero	September 4, 2000	Raw	Lexington, KY	1	78	79	This was a triple threat match, also involving Kurt Angle. WWE recognizes Guerrero's reign as ending on November 23, 2000, when the following episode aired on tape delay.	
70	Billy Gunn	November 21, 2000	SmackDown!	Sunrise, FL	1	19	16	WWE recognizes Gunn's reign as beginning on November 23, 2000, when the episode aired on tape delay.	
71	Chris Benoit	December 10, 2000	Armageddon	Birmingham, AL	3	42	41		
72	Chris Jericho	January 21, 2001	Royal Rumble	New Orleans, LA	4	72	73	This was a ladder match. WWE recognizes Jericho's reign as ending on April 5, 2001, when the following episode aired on tape delay.	
73	Triple H	April 3, 2001	SmackDown!	Oklahoma City, OK	3	7	6	WWE recognizes Triple H's reign as beginning on April 5, 2001 and ending on April 12, 2001, both episodes of which aired on tape delay.	
74	Jeff Hardy	April 10, 2001	SmackDown!	Philadelphia, PA	1	6	3	WWE recognizes Hardy's reign as beginning on April 12, 2001, when the episode aired on tape delay.	
75	Triple H	April 16, 2001	Raw	Knoxville, TN	4	34	33		
76	Kane	May 20, 2001	Judgment Day	Sacramento, CA	1	37	38	This was a chain match. WWE recognizes Kane's reign as ending on June 28, 2001, when the following episode aired on tape delay.	
77	Albert	June 26, 2001	SmackDown!	New York, NY	1	27	24	This was a no disqualification match. WWE recognizes Albert's reign as beginning on June 28, 2001, when the episode aired on tape delay.	
78	Lance Storm	July 23, 2001	Raw	Buffalo, NY	1	27	26		
79	Edge	August 19, 2001	SummerSlam	San Jose, CA	2	35	34		
80	Christian	September 23, 2001	Unforgiven	Pittsburgh, PA	1	28	27		
81	Edge	October 21, 2001	No Mercy	St. Louis, MO	3	15	14	This was a ladder match.	
82	Test	November 5, 2001	Raw	Uniondale, NY	1	13	12		
83	Edge	November 18, 2001	Survivor Series	Greensboro, NC	4	63	62	This was a title unification match, where Edge also defended the WCW United States Championship. The United States Championship was deactivated in favor of continuing the Intercontinental Championship.	
84	William Regal	January 20, 2002	Royal Rumble	Atlanta, GA	1	56	55		
85	Rob Van Dam	March 17, 2002	WrestleMania X8	Toronto, ON, Canada	1	35	34	On March 25, the brand extension began, in which wrestlers and championships became exclusive to either the Raw or SmackDown! brands, represented by the show of the same name. The title became exclusive to Raw when Van Dam was drafted to the Raw brand.	
WWF: Raw
86	Eddie Guerrero	April 21, 2002	Backlash	Kansas City, MO	2	36	35	On May 6, 2002, after the World Wrestling Federation was renamed "World Wrestling Entertainment" due to a lawsuit by the World Wide Fund for Nature, the title was subsequently renamed to WWE Intercontinental Championship.	
WWE: Raw
87	Rob Van Dam	May 27, 2002	Raw	Edmonton, AB, Canada	2	63	62	This was a ladder match. On July 22, 2002, Van Dam defeated Jeff Hardy to unify the European Championship into the Intercontinental Championship, retiring the European title.	
WWE: SmackDown!
88	Chris Benoit	July 29, 2002	Raw	Greensboro, NC	4	27	27	The title became exclusive to SmackDown! when Benoit defected to SmackDown! on July 30, 2002. Aired on tape delay on August 1, 2002. WWE incorrectly lists Benoit's reign as ending on August 26, 2002.	
WWE: Raw
89	Rob Van Dam	August 25, 2002	SummerSlam	Uniondale, NY	3	22	40	The title was returned to Raw due to Van Dam's status as a Raw wrestler. The following night on Raw, Van Dam defeated Tommy Dreamer to unify Hardcore Championship into the Intercontinental Championship, retiring the Hardcore title. WWE incorrectly list Van Dam's reign as beginning on August 6, 2002, and lasting 40 days.	
90	Chris Jericho	September 16, 2002	Raw	Denver, CO	5	14	13		
91	Kane	September 30, 2002	Raw	Houston, TX	2	20	19		
92	Triple H	October 20, 2002	No Mercy	North Little Rock, AR	5	<1	<1	This was a title unification match to unify the Intercontinental Championship with Triple H's World Heavyweight Championship.	
—	Unified	October 20, 2002	No Mercy	North Little Rock, AR	—	—	—	Unified with Triple H's World Heavyweight Championship; the Intercontinental Championship was deactivated.	
93	Christian	May 18, 2003	Judgment Day	Charlotte, NC	2	50	49	Raw Co-General Manager Stone Cold Steve Austin reactivated the title. Christian won the revived title in a battle royal.	
94	Booker T	July 7, 2003	Raw	Montreal, QC, Canada	1	34	33	That same month, the United States Championship was reactivated for the SmackDown brand as the Intercontinental title's counterpart.	
95	Christian	August 10, 2003	House show	Des Moines, IA	3	50	49		
96	Rob Van Dam	September 29, 2003	Raw	Rosemont, IL	4	28	27	This was a ladder match.	
97	Chris Jericho	October 27, 2003	Raw	Fayetteville, NC	6	<1	<1		
98	Rob Van Dam	October 27, 2003	Raw	Fayetteville, NC	5	48	47	This was a steel cage match.	
99	Randy Orton	December 14, 2003	Armageddon	Orlando, FL	1	210	209	Mick Foley was the guest referee.	
100	Edge	July 11, 2004	Vengeance	Hartford, CT	5	57	56		
—	Vacated	September 6, 2004	Raw	Wichita Falls, TX	—	—	—	Vacated due to a groin injury.	
101	Chris Jericho	September 12, 2004	Unforgiven	Portland, OR	7	37	36	Defeated Christian in a ladder match for the vacant title.	
102	Shelton Benjamin	October 19, 2004	Taboo Tuesday	Milwaukee, WI	1	244	244	Due to the stipulation of the event, fans could vote for who would face Chris Jericho for the title; Benjamin had the most votes.	
103	Carlito	June 20, 2005	Raw	Phoenix, AZ	1	90	90	WWE incorrectly list Carlito's reign as ending on September 19, 2005.	
104	Ric Flair	September 18, 2005	Unforgiven	Oklahoma City, OK	1	155	153	WWE incorrectly list Flair's reign as beginning on September 19, 2005, and lasting 153 days.	
105	Shelton Benjamin	February 20, 2006	Raw	Trenton, NJ	2	69	68		
106	Rob Van Dam	April 30, 2006	Backlash	Lexington, KY	6	15	14	This was a Winner Takes All match, where Van Dam also defended his Money in the Bank contract.	
107	Shelton Benjamin	May 15, 2006	Raw	Lubbock, TX	3	41	40	This was a 3-on-2 handicap Texas tornado match, featuring Benjamin, Chris Masters, and Triple H against WWE Champion John Cena and Intercontinental Champion Rob Van Dam, where if someone pinned Cena or Van Dam, they would win their respective title; Benjamin pinned Van Dam.	
108	Johnny Nitro	June 25, 2006	Vengeance	Charlotte, NC	1	99	98	This was a triple threat match, also involving Carlito.	
109	Jeff Hardy	October 2, 2006	Raw	Topeka, KS	2	35	34		
110	Johnny Nitro	November 6, 2006	Raw	Columbus, OH	2	7	6	This was a no disqualification match.	
111	Jeff Hardy	November 13, 2006	Raw	Manchester, England	3	98	97		
112	Umaga	February 19, 2007	Raw	Bakersfield, CA	1	56	55		
113	Santino Marella	April 16, 2007	Raw	Milan, Italy	1	77	76	This was a No Holds Barred match. Santino was "picked out of the audience" by Vince McMahon.	
114	Umaga	July 2, 2007	Raw	Dallas, TX	2	62	62	WWE recognizes Umaga's reign as ending on September 3, 2007, when the following episode aired on tape delay.	
115	Jeff Hardy	September 2, 2007	Raw	Columbus, OH	4	190	189	WWE recognizes Hardy's reign as beginning on September 3, 2007, when the episode aired on tape delay.	
116	Chris Jericho	March 10, 2008	Raw	Milwaukee, WI	8	111	110		
117	Kofi Kingston	June 29, 2008	Night of Champions	Dallas, TX	1	49	48		
118	Santino Marella	August 17, 2008	SummerSlam	Indianapolis, IN	2	85	84	This was a Winners Take All mixed tag team match in which both Kofi Kingston's Intercontinental and Mickie James's Women's Championship were on the line. Marella won Kingston's title when his partner, Beth Phoenix, pinned James.	
119	William Regal	November 10, 2008	Raw	Manchester, England	2	70	69		
120	CM Punk	January 19, 2009	Raw	Rosemont, IL	1	49	48	This was a no disqualification match.	
121	John "Bradshaw" Layfield	March 9, 2009	Raw	Jacksonville, FL	1	27	26		
122	Rey Mysterio	April 5, 2009	WrestleMania 25	Houston, TX	1	63	62	The title became exclusive to SmackDown following the 2009 WWE Draft.	
WWE: SmackDown
123	Chris Jericho	June 7, 2009	Extreme Rules	New Orleans, LA	9	21	20	This was a No Holds Barred match.	
124	Rey Mysterio	June 28, 2009	The Bash	Sacramento, CA	2	65	67	This was a mask vs. title match. WWE recognizes Mysterio's reign as ending on September 4, 2009, when the following episode aired on tape delay.	
125	John Morrison	September 1, 2009	SmackDown	Cleveland, OH	3	103	99	WWE recognizes Morrison's reign as beginning on September 4, 2009, when the episode aired on tape delay. John Morrison was formerly known as Johnny Nitro.	
126	Drew McIntyre	December 13, 2009	TLC: Tables, Ladders & Chairs	San Antonio, TX	1	161	160	On May 7, 2010, SmackDown General Manager Theodore Long suspended McIntyre and vacated the title. The following week on SmackDown, Kofi Kingston won a tournament to declare a new champion, but Vince McMahon reverted Long's decision, nullifying Kingston's win and continuing McIntyre's.	
127	Kofi Kingston	May 23, 2010	Over the Limit	Detroit, MI	2	66	74	WWE recognizes Kingston's reign as ending on August 6, 2010, when the following episode aired on tape delay.	
128	Dolph Ziggler	July 28, 2010	SmackDown	Laredo, TX	1	160	153	WWE recognizes Ziggler's reign as beginning on August 6, 2010, and ending on January 7, 2011, both episodes of which aired on tape delay.	
129	Kofi Kingston	January 4, 2011	SmackDown	Tucson, AZ	3	77	76	WWE recognizes Kingston's reign as beginning on January 7, 2011 and ending on March 25, 2011, both episodes of which aired on tape delay.	
130	Wade Barrett	March 22, 2011	SmackDown	Columbus, OH	1	89	85	WWE recognizes Barrett's reign as beginning on March 25, 2011, when the episode aired on tape delay.	
131	Ezekiel Jackson	June 19, 2011	Capitol Punishment	Washington, D.C.	1	51	53	WWE recognizes Jackson's reign as ending on August 12, 2011, when the following episode aired on tape delay.	
132	Cody Rhodes	August 9, 2011	SmackDown	Sacramento, CA	1	236	233	WWE recognizes Rhodes's reign as beginning on August 12, 2011, when the episode aired on tape delay. On August 29, 2011, the brand extension ended, allowing the Intercontinental Champion to appear on both Raw and SmackDown.	
WWE (unbranded)
133	Big Show	April 1, 2012	WrestleMania XXVIII	Miami Gardens, FL	1	28	27		
134	Cody Rhodes	April 29, 2012	Extreme Rules	Rosemont, IL	2	21	21	This was a tables match.	
135	Christian	May 20, 2012	Over the Limit	Raleigh, NC	4	64	63		
136	The Miz	July 23, 2012	Raw 1000	St. Louis, MO	1	85	84		
137	Kofi Kingston	October 16, 2012	Main Event	Memphis, TN	4	74	74	Aired on tape delay on October 17, 2012.	
138	Wade Barrett	December 29, 2012	Raw	Washington, D.C.	2	99	98	Aired on tape delay on December 31, 2012.	
139	The Miz	April 7, 2013	WrestleMania 29; Pre-Show	East Rutherford, NJ	2	1	1		
140	Wade Barrett	April 8, 2013	Raw	East Rutherford, NJ	3	69	68		
141	Curtis Axel	June 16, 2013	Payback	Rosemont, IL	1	155	155	This was a triple threat match, also involving The Miz.	
142	Big E Langston	November 18, 2013	Raw	Nashville, TN	1	167	166	On February 12, 2014, Big E Langston's ring name was shortened to Big E.	
143	Bad News Barrett	May 4, 2014	Extreme Rules	East Rutherford, NJ	4	57	57	Bad News Barrett was formerly known as Wade Barrett.	
—	Vacated	June 30, 2014	Raw	Hartford, CT	—	—	—	Title vacated due to a shoulder injury.	
144	The Miz	July 20, 2014	Battleground	Tampa, FL	3	28	27	This was a 19-man battle royal. Miz last eliminated Dolph Ziggler to win the vacant title.	
145	Dolph Ziggler	August 17, 2014	SummerSlam	Los Angeles, CA	2	35	35		
146	The Miz	September 21, 2014	Night of Champions	Nashville, TN	4	1	<1		
147	Dolph Ziggler	September 22, 2014	Raw	Memphis, TN	3	56	56		
148	Luke Harper	November 17, 2014	Raw	Roanoke, VA	1	27	26		
149	Dolph Ziggler	December 14, 2014	TLC: Tables, Ladders & Chairs	Cleveland, OH	4	22	22	This was a ladder match.	
150	Bad News Barrett	January 5, 2015	Raw	Corpus Christi, TX	5	83	82	Dolph Ziggler originally retained his title against Barrett, but Director of Operations Kane made the match a two-out-of-three falls match, which Barrett won.	
151	Daniel Bryan	March 29, 2015	WrestleMania 31	Santa Clara, CA	1	43	43	This was a seven-way ladder match, also involving Dean Ambrose, Dolph Ziggler, Luke Harper, R-Truth, and Stardust.	
—	Vacated	May 11, 2015	Raw	Cincinnati, OH	—	—	—	Daniel Bryan was forced to relinquish the title due to a concussion-related injury.	
152	Ryback	May 31, 2015	Elimination Chamber	Corpus Christi, TX	1	112	111	This was an Elimination Chamber match for the vacant title, also involving Sheamus, Dolph Ziggler, Mark Henry, R-Truth, and King Barrett.	
153	Kevin Owens	September 20, 2015	Night of Champions	Houston, TX	1	84	84		
154	Dean Ambrose	December 13, 2015	TLC: Tables, Ladders & Chairs	Boston, MA	1	64	63		
155	Kevin Owens	February 15, 2016	Raw	Anaheim, CA	2	48	47	This was a fatal five-way match, also involving Tyler Breeze, Stardust, and Dolph Ziggler.	
156	Zack Ryder	April 3, 2016	WrestleMania 32	Arlington, TX	1	1	1	This was a seven-way ladder match, also involving Dolph Ziggler, Sami Zayn, Stardust, Sin Cara, and The Miz.	
157	The Miz	April 4, 2016	Raw	Dallas, TX	5	188	188	The brand extension returned and the title became exclusive to the SmackDown brand following the 2016 WWE Draft.	
WWE: SmackDown
158	Dolph Ziggler	October 9, 2016	No Mercy	Sacramento, CA	5	37	36	This was a title vs. career match.	
159	The Miz	November 15, 2016	SmackDown	Wilkes-Barre, PA	6	49	48		
160	Dean Ambrose	January 3, 2017	SmackDown	Jacksonville, FL	2	152	151	The title became exclusive to the Raw brand following the 2017 WWE Superstar Shake-up.	
WWE: Raw
161	The Miz	June 4, 2017	Extreme Rules	Baltimore, MD	7	169	169	If Ambrose was disqualified, he would have lost the title.	
162	Roman Reigns	November 20, 2017	Raw	Houston, TX	1	63	62		
163	The Miz	January 22, 2018	Raw 25 Years	Brooklyn, NY	8	76	75		
164	Seth Rollins	April 8, 2018	WrestleMania 34	New Orleans, LA	1	71	71	This was a triple threat match, also involving Finn Bálor.	
165	Dolph Ziggler	June 18, 2018	Raw	Grand Rapids, MI	6	62	61		
166	Seth Rollins	August 19, 2018	SummerSlam	Brooklyn, NY	2	119	119		
167	Dean Ambrose	December 16, 2018	TLC: Tables, Ladders & Chairs	San Jose, CA	3	29	28		
168	Bobby Lashley	January 14, 2019	Raw	Memphis, TN	1	34	33	This was a triple threat match, also involving Seth Rollins.	
169	Finn Bálor	February 17, 2019	Elimination Chamber	Houston, TX	1	22	21	This was a 2-on-1 handicap match, featuring Lio Rush as Bobby Lashley's partner. Bálor pinned Rush to win Lashley's title.	
170	Bobby Lashley	March 11, 2019	Raw	Pittsburgh, PA	2	27	27		
171	Finn Bálor	April 7, 2019	WrestleMania 35	East Rutherford, NJ	2	98	97	The title became exclusive to the SmackDown brand following the 2019 WWE Superstar Shake-up.	
WWE: SmackDown
172	Shinsuke Nakamura	July 14, 2019	Extreme Rules; Kickoff	Philadelphia, PA	1	201	201		
173	Braun Strowman	January 31, 2020	SmackDown	Tulsa, OK	1	37	36		
174	Sami Zayn	March 8, 2020	Elimination Chamber	Philadelphia, PA	1	65	65	This was a 3-on-1 Handicap match, also involving Shinsuke Nakamura and Cesaro who teamed with Zayn. Zayn pinned Braun Strowman to win the title.	
—	Vacated	May 12, 2020	Backstage	—	—	—	—	Sami Zayn was stripped of the title after electing to refrain from competing during the COVID-19 pandemic. In storyline, he claimed to still be the champion, and continued to carry around his copy of the belt after he returned in August 2020.	
175	AJ Styles	June 8, 2020	SmackDown	Orlando, FL	1	74	71	Defeated Daniel Bryan in a tournament final for the vacant title. WWE recognizes this reign as beginning on June 12, 2020, when the match aired on tape delay. WWE incorrectly lists Styles' reign as lasting 71 days, ending on August 22, 2020.	
176	Jeff Hardy	August 21, 2020	SmackDown	Orlando, FL	5	37	36	On August 28, 2020, Sami Zayn returned with his own title belt, claiming to be the legitimate champion as he was never defeated. WWE did not recognize Zayn as champion; however, this led to the following match to determine the undisputed champion.	
177	Sami Zayn	September 27, 2020	Clash of Champions	Orlando, FL	2	86	89	This was a triple threat ladder match also involving AJ Styles in which the winner had to retrieve both Jeff Hardy's belt and Zayn's faux belt to determine the undisputed champion. WWE recognizes Zayn's reign as ending on December 25, 2020, when the following episode aired on tape delay.	
178	Big E	December 22, 2020	SmackDown	St. Petersburg, FL	2	110	106	This was a lumberjack match. WWE recognizes Big E's reign as beginning on December 25, 2020, when the episode aired on tape delay.	
179	Apollo Crews	April 11, 2021	WrestleMania 37; Night 2	Tampa, FL	1	124	123	This was a Nigerian Drum Fight.	
180	King Nakamura	August 13, 2021	SmackDown	Tulsa, OK	2	182	189	Nakamura won the title under the name King Nakamura; name reverted back to Shinsuke Nakamura on October 8, 2021. WWE recognizes Nakamura's reign as ending on February 18, 2022, when the following episode aired on tape delay.	
181	Sami Zayn	February 11, 2022	SmackDown	New Orleans, LA	3	21	13	WWE recognizes Zayn's reign as beginning on February 18, 2022, when the episode aired on tape delay.	
182	Ricochet	March 4, 2022	SmackDown	Miami, FL	1	98	98		
183	Gunther	June 10, 2022	SmackDown	Baton Rouge, LA	1	666	666	The title became exclusive to the Raw brand following the 2023 WWE Draft.	
WWE: Raw
184	Sami Zayn	April 6, 2024	WrestleMania XL; Night 1	Philadelphia, PA	4	119	118		
185	Bron Breakker	August 3, 2024	SummerSlam	Cleveland, OH	1	51	51		
186	Jey Uso	September 23, 2024	Raw	Ontario, CA	1	28	27		
187	Bron Breakker	October 21, 2024	Raw	Philadelphia, PA	2	181	180		
188	Dominik Mysterio	April 20, 2025	WrestleMania 41; Night 2	Paradise, NV	1	204	204	This was a fatal four-way match, also involving Penta and Finn Bálor, the latter of whom Mysterio pinned.	
189	John Cena	November 10, 2025	Raw	Boston, MA	1	19	18		
190	Dominik Mysterio	November 29, 2025	Survivor Series: WarGames	San Diego, CA	2	93	93		
191	Penta	March 2, 2026	Raw	Indianapolis, IN	1	153	152		
192	Chad Gable	August 2, 2026	SummerSlam; Night 2	Minneapolis, MN	1	92	91		
193	Ethan Page	November 2, 2026	Raw	Brooklyn, NY	1	20+	20+		

== Combined reigns ==
As of November 22, 2026.

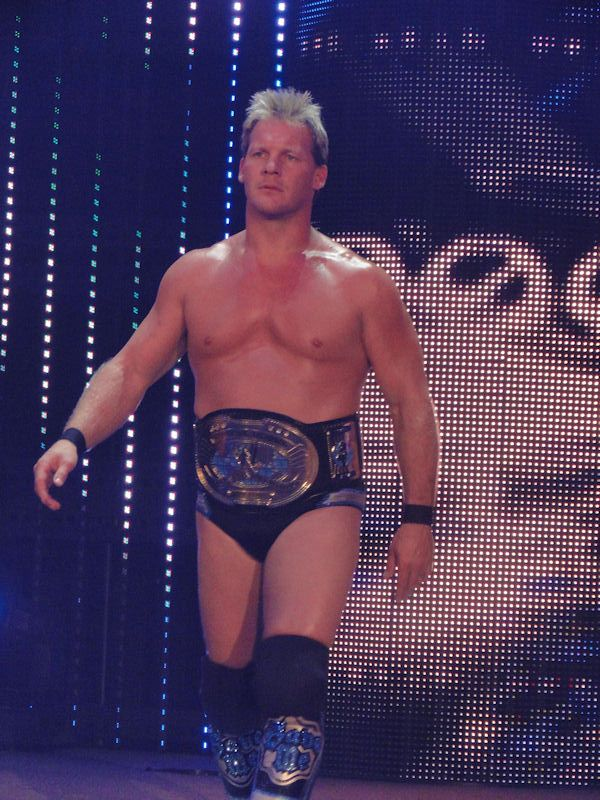
Record nine-time champion Chris Jericho, shown here with the 2002–2011 belt design.

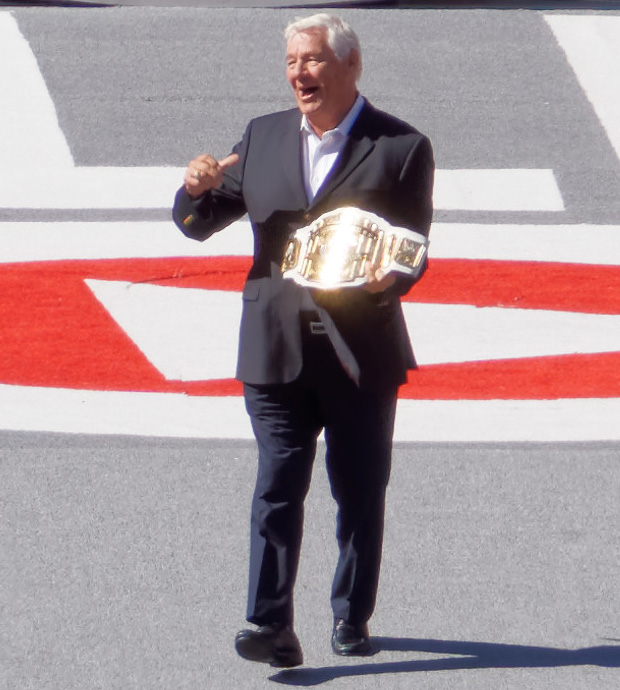
Inaugural champion Pat Patterson, shown here with the 2011–2019 belt design.

†	Indicates the current champion

Rank	Wrestler	No. of reigns	Combined days	Combined days rec. by WWE
1	Gunther	1	666	
2	Pedro Morales	2	619	617
3	The Miz	8	597	592
4	Don Muraco	2	541	539
5	The Honky Tonk Man	1	454	453
6	Tito Santana	2	443	441
7	Razor Ramon	4	437	434
8	Ultimate Warrior	2	434	432
9	Randy Savage	1	414	413
10	Mr. Perfect	2	406	404
10	Shawn Michaels	3	406	403
12	Wade Barrett	5 (Note: In his fourth and fifth reign Wade Barrett was wrestling as Bad News Barrett.)	397	390
13	Shinsuke Nakamura	2 (Note: Started his second reign under the name King Nakamura. Reverted back to Shinsuke Nakamura on October 8, 2021.)	383	390
14	Dolph Ziggler	6	372	363
15	Jeff Hardy	5	366	359
16	Shelton Benjamin	3	354	352
17	The Rock	2 (Note: During his first reign The Rock was known as Rocky Maivia.)	339	337
18	Chris Jericho	9	318	311
19	Jeff Jarrett	6	298	284
20	Dominik Mysterio	2	297	
21	Sami Zayn	4	291	285
22	Bret Hart	2	290	288
23	Greg Valentine	1	285	284
24	Big E	2 (Note: During his first reign, on February 12, 2014, Big E's ring name was shortened from Big E Langston.)	277	272
25	Kofi Kingston	4	266	272
26	Cody Rhodes	2	257	254
27	Dean Ambrose	3	245	242
28	Pat Patterson	1	233	232
29	Bron Breakker	2	232	231
30	Ken Patera	1	231	230
31	Rob Van Dam	6	211	224
32	Randy Orton	1	210	209
33	John Morrison	3 (Note: During his first and second reign John Morrison was known as Johnny Nitro.)	209	203
34	Triple H	5 (Note: During his first reign Triple H was known as Hunter Hearst Helmsley.)	196	
35	Christian	4	192	188
36	Seth Rollins	2	190	
37	Edge	5	171	166
38	Goldust	3	168	158
39	Santino Marella	2	162	160
40	Drew McIntyre	1	161	160
41	Curtis Axel	1	155	
41	Ric Flair	1	155	153
43	Penta	1	153	152
44	Rick Rude	1	148	147
45	Chris Benoit	4	142	159
46	Diesel	1	138	137
47	Kevin Owens	2	132	131
47	Owen Hart	2	132	130
49	Rey Mysterio	2	128	129
50	William Regal	2	126	124
51	Ken Shamrock	1	125	124
52	Apollo Crews	1	124	123
53	Finn Bálor	2	120	118
54	Umaga	2	118	119
55	Eddie Guerrero	2	114	116
56	Ryback	1	112	111
57	Ricochet	1	98	
58	Chad Gable	1	92	91
59	Carlito	1	90	
60	The Texas Tornado	1	84	83
61	Val Venis	2	83	79
62	Roddy Piper	1	77	76
63	AJ Styles	1	74	71
64	"Stone Cold" Steve Austin	2	65	91
64	Ricky Steamboat	1	65	64
66	Chyna	2	64	62
67	Roman Reigns	1	63	62
68	Bobby Lashley	2	61	60
69	The British Bulldog	1	59	58
70	Kane	2	57	58
71	Ezekiel Jackson	1	51	53
72	Ahmed Johnson	1	50	57
73	CM Punk	1	49	48
74	Daniel Bryan	1	43	
74	The Godfather	1	43	42
76	Braun Strowman	1	37	36
77	Kurt Angle	1	35	34
78	Booker T	1	34	33
79	Big Show	1	28	27
79	Jey Uso	1	28	27
79	Marc Mero	1	28	27
82	Albert	1	27	24
82	John "Bradshaw" Layfield	1	27	26
82	Lance Storm	1	27	26
82	Luke Harper	1	27	26
86	D'Lo Brown	1	26	27
87	Ethan Page †	1	20+	
88	Marty Jannetty	1	20	
89	Billy Gunn	1	19	17
89	John Cena	1	19	18
91	Rikishi	1	14	13
91	Road Dogg	1	14	13
93	Test	1	13	12
94	The Mountie	1	2	1
95	Zack Ryder	1	1	
96	Dean Douglas	1	<1	
