= WWE Madison Square Garden Classics =

- Created by: Vince McMahon
- Presented by: Gene Okerlund
- Country of origin: United States
- No. of episodes: 76

Production
- Camera setup: Multiple-camera setup
- Running time: 60 minutes

Original release
- Network: MSG Network
- Release: July 12, 2006 – August 26, 2009

WWE Madison Square Garden Classics, also known simply as Madison Square Garden Classics and MSG Classics, is a professional wrestling television program on the MSG Network, produced by World Wrestling Entertainment. It debuted in a two-hour block on July 12, 2006 and was hosted by longtime wrestling announcer "Mean" Gene Okerlund, primarily recapping and reairing WWF on MSG Network shows throughout the 1980s and early 1990s.

== History ==
On July 12, 2006, WWE programming returned to MSG Network for the first time since March 16, 1997. Two back to back episodes of MSG Classics air every Wednesday night. Each hour shows highlights of a WWF house show that took place at Madison Square Garden, originally telecast live on the network in the 1980s and 1990s.

Also featured are past episodes of Raw from the Garden, although only three such episodes to date have aired; on July 26, 2006, the very first Raw to take place at the Garden in September 1997; another featuring a past episode of Raw from MSG that took place in September 2002 aired on September 13, 2006; and a third with Raw from June 23, 2003 aired on September 5, 2007. Finally, the SummerSlam 1988 and SummerSlam 1991 pay-per-views along with "The War to Settle the Score" and "The Brawl to End it All" specials have also been shown. The show's run ended in 2008 but episodes 67-74 were rerun four times each from April 29, 2009 to August 26, 2009.

== Episode list ==
No.	Air date	Event profiled	Matches/segments shown
1	July 12, 2006	January 23, 1989	The Brain Busters (Arn Anderson and Tully Blanchard) vs. The Rockers (Shawn Michaels and Marty Jannetty); Hercules vs. Ted DiBiase (w/Virgil); Sean Mooney interviews Big Boss Man and Slick; Big Boss Man (w/Slick) vs. Hulk Hogan
2	July 12, 2006	August 30, 1982	WWF Intercontinental Champion Pedro Morales (c) vs. Jimmy Snuka (Special Referee: Ivan Putski); WWF Championship: Bob Backlund (c) vs. Buddy Rose (w/The Grand Wizard and Sherri Martel); Six-man tag team two out of three falls match: André the Giant, Chief Jay Strongbow, and Jules Strongbow vs. Blackjack Mulligan, Mr. Fuji, and Mr. Saito
3	July 26, 2006	June 21, 1985	Randy Savage vs. Rick McGraw; WWF Intercontinental Championship: Greg Valentine (w/Jimmy Hart) (c) vs. Ricky Steamboat; Gene Okerlund interviews The Magnificent Muraco and Mr. Fuji; Gene Okerlund interviews Hulk Hogan; WWF Championship Steel cage match: Hulk Hogan (c) vs. The Magnificent Muraco (w/Mr. Fuji)
4	July 26, 2006	Raw Is War; September 22, 1997	WWF Intercontinental Championship Tournament First Round Match: Rocky Maivia (w/Kama Mustafa, D'Lo Brown, and Faarooq) vs. Ahmed Johnson; WWF Intercontinental Championship Tournament Semifinal Match: Owen Hart vs. Brian Pillman (w/Marlena); Vince McMahon interviews Steve Austin; Falls count anywhere match: Cactus Jack vs. Hunter Hearst Helmsley (w/Chyna); WWF Champion Bret Hart vs. Goldust
5	August 2, 2006	September 23, 1985	André the Giant (w/Lou Albano) vs. King Kong Bundy (w/Jimmy Hart); The British Bulldogs (Davey Boy Smith and The Dynamite Kid) vs. The Hart Foundation (Bret Hart and Jim Neidhart) (w/Jimmy Hart); Gorilla Monsoon interviews Jimmy Hart and Terry Funk; The Junkyard Dog vs. Terry Funk (w/Jimmy Hart)
6	August 2, 2006	November 30, 1991	Hulk Hogan vs. Ric Flair (w/Mr. Perfect); WWF Intercontinental Championship: Bret Hart (c) vs. The Mountie (w/Jimmy Hart); The Nasty Boys (Brian Knobs and Jerry Sags) vs. The Rockers (Shawn Michaels and Marty Jannetty)
7	August 9, 2006	October 17, 1983	Sgt. Slaughter vs. Ivan Putski; WWF Championship: Bob Backlund (c) vs. The Masked Superstar; Vince McMahon interviews Jimmy Snuka; Vince McMahon interviews The Magnificent Muraco; WWF Intercontinental Championship Steel Cage Match: The Magnificent Muraco (w/Lou Albano) (c) vs. Jimmy Snuka (w/Buddy Rogers)
8	August 9, 2006	October 24, 1988	WWF Tag Team Championship: Demolition (Ax and Smash) (w/Mr. Fuji) (c) vs. The Rockers (Shawn Michaels and Marty Jannetty); WWF Championship: Randy Savage (w/Miss Elizabeth) (c) vs. André the Giant (w/Bobby Heenan); Sean Mooney interviews Rick Rude and Bobby Heenan; DDT vs. Rude Awakening Match: Jake Roberts (w/Cheryl Roberts) vs. Rick Rude
9	August 23, 2006	December 17, 1979	Hulk Hogan (w/Fred Blassie) vs. Ted DiBiase; Texas Death match for the vacant WWF Championship: Bob Backlund (w/ Arnold Skaaland) vs. Bobby Duncum (w/Lou Albano); NWA World Heavyweight Championship: Harley Race (c) vs. Dusty Rhodes
10	August 23, 2006	February 23, 1987	WWF Tag Team Championship: The Hart Foundation (Bret Hart and Jim Neidhart) (w/Jimmy Hart and Danny Davis) (c) vs. The Killer Bees (B. Brian Blair and Jim Brunzell); Jake Roberts vs. King Kong Bundy (w/Bobby Heenan); Roddy Piper, Ricky Steamboat, and The Junkyard Dog vs. WWF Intercontinental Champion Randy Savage, Adrian Adonis, and Harley Race; Gorilla Monsoon interviews Roddy Piper
11	September 6, 2006	January 21, 1991	The Undertaker (w/Brother Love) vs. Jimmy Snuka; The Legion of Doom (Hawk and Animal) vs. Demolition (Smash and Crush) (w/Mr. Fuji); The Nasty Boys (Brian Knobs and Jerry Sags) (w/ Jimmy Hart) vs. The Bushwhackers (Luke and Butch); Lord Alfred Hayes interviews Randy Savage and Sensational Sherri; Steel cage match: Randy Savage (w/Sensational Sherri) vs. The Ultimate Warrior
12	September 6, 2006	February 20, 1984	Roddy Piper and David Schultz vs. The Invaders (#1 and #2); WWF Intercontinental Championship: Tito Santana (c) vs. The Magnificent Muraco (w/Lou Albano); Vince McMahon interviews Hulk Hogan; WWF Championship: Hulk Hogan (c) vs. Paul Orndorff (w/Roddy Piper)
13	September 13, 2006	April 25, 1988	Bret Hart vs. Bad News Brown; WWF Championship: Randy Savage (w/Miss Elizabeth) (c) vs. Ted DiBiase (w/Virgil); Gorilla Monsoon interviews Ted DiBiase and Virgil; Lord Alfred Hayes interviews Randy Savage and Miss Elizabeth; Gorilla Monsoon interviews Demolition and Mr. Fuji; Lord Alfred Hayes interviews Strike Force; WWF Tag Team Championship: Demolition (Ax and Smash) (w/Mr. Fuji) (c) vs. Strike Force (Rick Martel and Tito Santana)
14	September 13, 2006	Raw; August 26, 2002	Triple H promo; Jeff Hardy vs. Chris Jericho; Terri Runnels interviews WWE Undisputed Champion Brock Lesnar and Paul Heyman; Unification match for the WWE Intercontinental and Hardcore Championships: Rob Van Dam (Intercontinental) vs. Tommy Dreamer (Hardcore); WWE Undisputed Championship number one contender's match: Triple H vs. The Undertaker
15	October 4, 2006	December 26, 1983	Jimmy Snuka and Arnold Skaaland vs. The Magnificent Muraco and Lou Albano; Lord Alfred Hayes interviews Jimmy Snuka and Arnold Skaaland after the match; Sgt. Slaughter vs. Chief Jay Strongbow; WWF Championship: Bob Backlund (w/Arnold Skaaland) (c) vs. The Iron Sheik (w/Fred Blassie); Lord Alfred Hayes interviews new WWF Champion The Iron Sheik and Fred Blassie after the match; Lord Alfred Hayes interviews Bob Backlund and Arnold Skaaland after the match
16	October 4, 2006	January 27, 1986	Paul Orndorff vs. Big John Studd (w/Bobby Heenan); Terry Funk (w/ Jimmy Hart) vs. Scott McGhee; WWF Championship: Hulk Hogan (c) vs. Randy Savage (w/Miss Elizabeth); WWF Tag Team Championship: The Dream Team (Greg Valentine and Brutus Beefcake) (c) (w/Johnny V) vs. The British Bulldogs (Davey Boy Smith and The Dynamite Kid) (w/Lou Albano)
17	May 16, 2007	October 28, 1991	Ric Flair (w/Bobby Heenan) vs. Roddy Piper; Sean Mooney interviews Ric Flair and Bobby Heenan after the match; WWF Intercontinental Championship: Bret Hart (c) vs. The Berzerker; WWF Tag Team Championship: The Legion of Doom (Hawk and Animal) (c) vs. The Natural Disasters (Earthquake and Typhoon) (w/ Jimmy Hart)
18	May 16, 2007	September 22, 1986	The Rougeau Brothers (Jacques and Raymond) vs. The Hart Foundation (Bret Hart and Jim Neidhart) (w/ Jimmy Hart); Harley Race (w/ Bobby Heenan) vs. Tito Santana; Gorilla Monsoon interviews King Kong Bundy, Big John Studd, and Bobby Heenan; Gorilla Monsoon interviews Hulk Hogan and The Machines; WWF Champion Hulk Hogan (as Hulk Machine) and The Machines (Big Machine and Super Machine) vs. King Kong Bundy, Big John Studd, and Bobby Heenan
19	May 23, 2007	March 18, 1989	Mr. Perfect vs. Ronnie Garvin; Sean Mooney interviews Big Boss Man and Slick; Steel Cage Match: Hulk Hogan vs. Big Boss Man (w/Slick); The Rockers (Shawn Michaels and Marty Jannetty) vs. The Brain Busters (Arn Anderson and Tully Blanchard)
20	May 23, 2007	February 18, 1983	Mr. Fuji vs. Tony Garea; Mr. Fuji interview after the match; Ray Stevens (w/Fred Blassie) vs. Chief Jay Strongbow; Vince McMahon interviews The Magnificent Muraco; Vince McMahon interviews Bob Backlund; WWF Championship: Bob Backlund (c) (w/Arnold Skaaland) vs. WWF Intercontinental Champion The Magnificent Muraco (w/Lou Albano); The Magnificent Muraco interview after the match
21	May 30, 2007	December 28, 1984	Jimmy Snuka and The Tonga Kid vs. Roddy Piper and Cowboy Bob Orton; Dick Clark presents an award to Cyndi Lauper; WWF Tag Team Championship: Dick Murdoch and Adrian Adonis (c) vs Jack Brisco and Jerry Brisco; WWF Championship: Hulk Hogan (c) vs The Iron Sheik (w/Fred Blassie)
22	May 30, 2007	October 19, 1990	The Warlord vs. Koko B. Ware; WWF Intercontinental Championship: The Texas Tornado (c) vs. Mr. Perfect (w/Bobby Heenan); Ted DiBiase (w/Virgil) vs. Dusty Rhodes; Lord Alfred Hayes interviews Dusty Rhodes after the match; Lord Alfred Hayes interviews Ted DiBiase and Virgil after the match; WWF Tag Team Championship: The Hart Foundation (Bret Hart and Jim Neidhart) (c) vs. Rhythm and Blues (The Honky Tonk Man and Greg Valentine)
23	June 13, 2007	September 29, 1988	The Rockers vs. Los Conquistadores; The Junkyard Dog vs. King Haku (w/Bobby Heenan); WWF Championship: Randy Savage (c) (w/Miss Elizabeth) vs. André the Giant; Sean Mooney interviews André the Giant and Bobby Heenan; WWF Intercontinental Championship: The Ultimate Warrior (c) vs. The Honky Tonk Man (w/Jimmy Hart)
24	June 13, 2007	May 19, 1980	$15,000 16 man Over the Top Rope Battle Royal; WWF Championship Texas Death Match: Bob Backlund (c) vs. WWF Intercontinental Champion Ken Patera; Six man tag team two out of three falls match: Tony Atlas, Ivan Putski, and Pat Patterson vs. The Wild Samoans (Afa and Sika) and Peter Maivia
25	June 27, 2007	January 19, 1987	Paul Orndorff (w/Bobby Heenan) vs. George Steele; WWF Championship No Disqualification Match: Hulk Hogan (c) vs. Kamala (w/The Wizard and Kim Chee); Gorilla Monsoon interviews Harley Race and Bobby Heenan; The Junkyard Dog vs. Harley Race (w/Bobby Heenan); WWF Tag Team Championship: Davey Boy Smith (c) and Billy Jack Haynes vs. The Hart Foundation (Bret Hart and Jim Neidhart) (w/Jimmy Hart)
26	June 27, 2007	September 30, 1989	WWF Intercontinental Championship: The Ultimate Warrior (c) vs. André the Giant (w/Bobby Heenan); WWF Tag Team Championship: The Brain Busters (Arn Anderson and Tully Blanchard) (c) (w/Bobby Heenan) vs. Demolition (Ax and Smash); Lord Alfred Hayes interviews Roddy Piper; Lord Alfred Hayes interviews Rick Rude and Bobby Heenan; Roddy Piper vs. Rick Rude (w/Bobby Heenan)
27	July 4, 2007	May 21, 1984	WWF Intercontinental Championship: Tito Santana (c) vs. Paul Orndorff; Sgt. Slaughter vs. The Iron Sheik (w/Fred Blassie); Sgt. Slaughter promo; WWF Championship: Hulk Hogan (c) vs. David Schultz
28	July 4, 2007	June 3, 1991	Jim Duggan vs. Col. Mustafa (w/General Adnan); Bret Hart vs. The Barbarian (w/Mr. Fuji); The Mountie vs. Big Boss Man; Sean Mooney interviews Hulk Hogan; WWF Championship Desert Storm Rules: Hulk Hogan (c) vs. Sgt. Slaughter (w/ General Adnan)
29	July 11, 2007	January 21, 1985	André the Giant vs. Ken Patera (w/Bobby Heenan); Texas Tornado Match: Roddy Piper and Bob Orton vs. Jimmy Snuka and The Junkyard Dog; WWF Intercontinental Championship: Greg Valentine (c) vs. Tito Santana
30	July 11, 2007	April 24, 1989	Jake Roberts vs. Ted DiBiase (w/Virgil); Bret Hart vs. Mr. Perfect; WWF Championship: Hulk Hogan (c) vs. Randy Savage (w/Sensational Sherri)
31	July 25, 2007	March 16, 1997	Jim Ross interviews Owen Hart and The British Bulldog; WWF Tag Team Championship: Owen Hart and The British Bulldog (c) vs. Doug Furnas and Philip Lafon; Jim Ross interviews Hunter Hearst Helmsley and Chyna; WWF Intercontinental Championship: Rocky Maivia (c) vs. Hunter Hearst Helmsley (w/Chyna); The Undertaker promo; Casket match: The Undertaker vs. Vader (w/Paul Bearer)
32	July 25, 2007	June 27, 1977	Two out of three falls match: André the Giant and Chief Jay Strongbow vs. Ken Patera and Nikolai Volkoff; Vince McMahon interviews WWWF Champion Superstar Billy Graham and The Grand Wizard; WWWF World Heavyweight Championship: Billy Graham (c) (w/The Grand Wizard) vs. Bruno Sammartino (w/Arnold Skaaland); Peter Maivia vs. Mikel Scicluna
33	August 1, 2007	December 26, 1987	Greg Valentine (w/Jimmy Hart) vs. Brutus Beefcake; Rick Rude (w/Bobby Heenan) vs. Ricky Steamboat; WWF Intercontinental Championship: The Honky Tonk Man (c) (w/Jimmy Hart and Peggy Sue) vs. Randy Savage (w/Miss Elizabeth)
34	August 1, 2007	March 19, 1990	The Orient Express (Sato and Tanaka) (w/Mr. Fuji) vs. Demolition (Ax and Smash); Bret Hart vs. Rick Martel; WWF Intercontinental Championship: The Ultimate Warrior (c) vs. Mr. Perfect
35	August 8, 2007	July 12, 1986	$50,000 22 Man Over the Top Rope Battle Royal; The Junkyard Dog vs. Greg Valentine; Gorilla Monsoon and Lord Alfred Hayes interview Randy Savage; Gorilla Monsoon and Lord Alfred Hayes interview Bruno Sammartino; Steel Cage Match: Tito Santana and Bruno Sammartino vs. WWF Intercontinental Champion Randy Savage and Adrian Adonis
36	August 8, 2007	January 25, 1988	One Man Gang (w/Slick) vs. Don Muraco (w/Billy Graham); WWF Champion Hulk Hogan and Bam Bam Bigelow (w/Oliver Humperdink) vs. Ted DiBiase and Virgil (w/André the Giant); Vince McMahon interviews The Islanders and Bobby Heenan; The Islanders (Haku and Tama) (w/Bobby Heenan) vs. The British Bulldogs (Davey Boy Smith and The Dynamite Kid)
37	August 15, 2007	SummerSlam 1988; August 29, 1988	The British Bulldogs (Davey Boy Smith and The Dynamite Kid) vs. The Fabulous Rougeau Brothers (Jacques and Raymond); Rick Rude (w/Bobby Heenan) vs. The Junkyard Dog; Gene Okerlund interviews The Honky Tonk Man and Jimmy Hart; The Powers of Pain (The Barbarian and The Warlord) (w/The Baron) vs The Bolsheviks (Nikolai Volkoff and Boris Zhukov) (w/Slick); WWF Intercontinental Championship: The Honky Tonk Man (c) (w/Jimmy Hart) vs. The Ultimate Warrior; Sean Mooney interviews new WWF Intercontinental Champion The Ultimate Warrior after the match
38	August 15, 2007	SummerSlam 1988; August 29, 1988	WWF Tag Team Championship: Demolition (Ax and Smash) (c) (w/Mr. Fuji and Jimmy Hart) vs. The Hart Foundation (Bret Hart and Jim Neidhart); Jake Roberts vs. Hercules; Gene Okerlund interviews The Mega Powers and Miss Elizabeth; The Mega Powers (Hulk Hogan and Randy Savage) (w/Miss Elizabeth) vs. The Mega Bucks (André the Giant and Ted DiBiase) (w/Bobby Heenan and Virgil) (Special Referee: Jesse Ventura)
39	August 29, 2007	January 31, 1992	Shawn Michaels vs. Jimmy Snuka; Lord Alfred Hayes interviews The Undertaker and Paul Bearer; The Undertaker (w/Paul Bearer) vs. Bret Hart; Lord Alfred Hayes interviews Randy Savage; Randy Savage (w/Miss Elizabeth) vs. Jake Roberts
40	August 29, 2007	November 23, 1981	WWF Intercontinental Championship Texas Death Match: The Magnificent Muraco (c) vs. Pedro Morales; The Haiti Kid vs. Little Boy Blue; No Holds Barred Match for the Vacant WWF Heavyweight Championship: Bob Backlund (w/Arnold Skaaland) vs. Greg Valentine; Tony Atlas vs. Mr. Fuji
41	September 5, 2007	June 14, 1987	Paul Orndorff (w/Bobby Heenan) vs. The Junkyard Dog; Gorilla Monsoon interviews Hulk Hogan; WWF Championship Texas Death Match: Hulk Hogan (c) vs. Harley Race (w/Bobby Heenan); Gorilla Monsoon and Lord Alfred Hayes interview Dave Winfield; The British Bulldogs (Davey Boy Smith and The Dynamite Kid) and Billy Jack Haynes vs. WWF Tag Team Champions The Hart Foundation (Bret Hart and Jim Neidhart) and Danny Davis
42	September 5, 2007	Raw; June 23, 2003	WWE Intercontinental Champion Christian and Test vs. Booker T and Scott Steiner (w/Stacy Keibler); Randy Orton and Ric Flair promo; Shawn Michaels and Kevin Nash vs. Evolution (Ric Flair and Randy Orton); Randy Orton and Ric Flair attack Mick Foley backstage; 5-Minute "White Boy" Challenge: Goldberg vs. Rodney Mack (w/Theodore Long); Kane and Rob Van Dam promo; World Heavyweight Championship Title vs. Mask Match: Triple H (c) (w/Ric Flair) vs. Kane
43	September 12, 2007	War To Settle The Score; February 18, 1985	WWF Women's Championship: Wendi Richter (w/ Cyndi Lauper and David Wolff) (c) vs. Leilani Kai (w/The Fabulous Moolah); Jimmy Snuka vs. Bob Orton; WWF Championship: Hulk Hogan (c) (w/Lou Albano, Cyndi Lauper, and David Wolff) vs. Roddy Piper (w/Bob Orton); Gene Okerlund interviews Hulk Hogan, Cyndi Lauper, David Wolff, and Mr. T; Gene Okerlund interviews Andy Warhol; Gene Okerlund interviews Joe Piscopo; Gene Okerlund interviews Danny DeVito and Roddy Piper
44	September 12, 2007	November 25, 1989	The Rockers (Marty Jannetty and Shawn Michaels) vs. The Hart Foundation (Bret Hart and Jim Neidhart); Jake Roberts vs. Ted DiBiase (w/Virgil); Sean Mooney interviews Randy Savage and Sensational Sherri; Jim Duggan vs. Randy Savage (w/Sensational Sherri)
45	September 19, 2007	December 29, 1991	The Nasty Boys (Brian Knobs and Jerry Sags) vs. The Bushwhackers (Luke and Butch); WWF Intercontinental Championship: Bret Hart (c) vs. Ted DiBiase (w/Sensational Sherri); Hulk Hogan vs. Ric Flair (w/Mr. Perfect)
46	September 19, 2007	May 4, 1981	WWF Heavyweight Championship: Bob Backlund (c) vs. Angelo Mosca; Alley Fight: Pat Patterson vs. Sgt. Slaughter (w/The Grand Wizard); Two out of three falls match: Tony Garea, Gorilla Monsoon, and Rick Martel vs. Lou Albano, Stan Hansen, and Moondog Rex
47	May 14, 2008	July 1, 1991	WWF Tag Team Championship: The Nasty Boys (Brian Knobs and Jerry Sags) (c) (w/Jimmy Hart) vs. The Hart Foundation (Bret Hart and Jim Neidhart); Jake Roberts (w/André the Giant) vs Earthquake (w/Jimmy Hart); Sean Mooney interviews The Undertaker and Paul Bearer; Bodybag Match: The Ultimate Warrior vs The Undertaker (w/Paul Bearer)
48	May 14, 2008	August 25, 1984	WWF Tag Team Championship: Dick Murdoch and Adrian Adonis (c) vs. The Wild Samoans (Afa and Sika) (Special Referee: Lou Albano); Roddy Piper vs Jimmy Snuka; Lord Alfred Hayes interviews Jimmy Snuka's doctor; WWF Intercontinental Championship: Tito Santana (c) vs. Greg Valentine; Lord Alfred Hayes interviews Greg Valentine after the match; Lord Alfred Hayes interviews Tito Santana after the match
49	May 21, 2008	January 15, 1990	The Powers of Pain (The Warlord and The Barbarian) (w/Mr. Fuji) vs The Rockers (Shawn Michaels and Marty Jannetty); WWF Heavyweight Championship: Hulk Hogan (c) vs. Mr. Perfect (w/The Genius); Sean Mooney interviews Ted DiBiase and Virgil; Sean Mooney interviews Jake Roberts; Million Dollar Championship: Ted DiBiase (c) (w/Virgil) vs. Jake Roberts
50	May 21, 2008	July 13, 1985	Terry Funk vs. Lanny Poffo; Gorilla Monsoon interviews Roddy Piper; Paul Orndorff vs. Roddy Piper; The British Bulldogs (Davey Boy Smith and The Dynamite Kid) vs. The Hart Foundation (Bret Hart and Jim Neidhart) (w/Jimmy Hart)
51	May 28, 2008	June 25, 1988	Jim Duggan vs. One Man Gang; Lord Alfred Hayes interviews The Ultimate Warrior; Lord Alfred Hayes interviews Bobby Heenan; Weasel Suit Match: The Ultimate Warrior vs. Bobby Heenan; Lord Alfred Hayes interviews Bobby Heenan after the match; Lord Alfred Hayes interviews Ted DiBiase and Virgil; WWF Heavyweight Championship Steel Cage Match: Randy Savage (c) (w/Miss Elizabeth) vs. Ted DiBiase (w/Virgil)
52	May 28, 2008	November 24, 1986	Billy Jack Haynes vs. Bob Orton (w/ Jimmy Hart); Kamala (w/The Wizard and Kim Chee) vs. George Steele; Hulk Hogan and Roddy Piper vs. Paul Orndorff and Harley Race (w/Bobby Heenan); The Dream Team (Greg Valentine and Brutus Beefcake) (w/Johnny V) vs. The Islanders (Haku and Tama)
53	June 4, 2008	May 23, 1983	Bob Backlund promo; WWF Heavyweight Championship: Bob Backlund (c) (w/Arnold Skaaland) vs. Sgt. Slaughter (w/ The Grand Wizard); Jimmy Snuka and Buddy Rogers promo; Jimmy Snuka (w/Buddy Rogers) vs Wild Samoan No. 1 (w/Lou Albano); WWF Intercontinental Championship: The Magnificent Muraco vs. Rocky Johnson
54	June 4, 2008	November 24, 1987	WWF Women's Tag Team Championship: The Glamour Girls (Judy Martin and Lelani Kai) (c) (w/Jimmy Hart) vs. Jumping Bomb Angels (Noriyo Tateno and Itsuki Yamazaki); WWF Intercontinental Championship: The Honky Tonk Man (c) (w/Jimmy Hart) vs. Randy Savage (w/Miss Elizabeth); WWF Tag Team Championship: Strike Force (Rick Martel and Tito Santana) (c) vs. The Hart Foundation (Bret Hart and Jim Neidhart) (w/Jimmy Hart)
55	June 25, 2008	January 23, 1984	Sgt. Slaughter vs. Ivan Putski; WWF Intercontinental Championship: The Magnificent Muraco (c) (w/Lou Albano) vs. Tito Santana; Gene Okerlund interviews The Iron Sheik and Fred Blassie; WWF Heavyweight Championship: The Iron Sheik (c) (w/Fred Blassie) vs. Hulk Hogan; Gene Okerlund interviews new WWF Champion Hulk Hogan after the match; Gene Okerlund interviews Hulk Hogan and his parents
56	June 25, 2008	February 20, 1989	The Bushwhackers (Luke and Butch) vs. The Fabulous Rougeau Brothers (Jacques and Raymond); Brutus Beefcake vs Rick Rude; Sean Mooney interviews Randy Savage; WWF Heavyweight Champion Randy Savage vs. WWF Intercontinental Champion The Ultimate Warrior
57	July 2, 2008	March 15, 1991	The Undertaker (w/Paul Bearer) vs. Tugboat; WWF Tag Team Championship: The Hart Foundation (Bret Hart and Jim Neidhart) (c) vs. Earthquake and Dino Bravo (w/Jimmy Hart); The Texas Tornado (w/Virgil) vs. Ted DiBiase; WWF Heavyweight Championship Flag Match: Sgt. Slaughter (c) (w/General Adnan) vs. Jim Duggan (w/Hulk Hogan)
58	July 2, 2008	April 23, 1984	The Iron Sheik vs. Sgt. Slaughter; Roddy Piper, Paul Orndorff, and Dave Schultz vs. Ivan Putski, Rocky Johnson, and Tony Atlas; Greg Valentine and Lou Albano interview; Bob Backlund (w/Arnold Skaaland) vs. Greg Valentine (w/Lou Albano)
59	July 9, 2008	April 22, 1986	WWF Tag Team Champion The Dynamite Kid vs. Brutus Beefcake (w/Johnny Valiant); WWF Intercontinental Championship No Disqualification Match: Randy Savage (c) (w/Miss Elizabeth) vs. Tito Santana; WWF Heavyweight Champion Hulk Hogan and Hillbilly Jim vs. Big John Studd and King Kong Bundy (w/Bobby Heenan)
60	July 9, 2008	February 23, 1992	WWF Intercontinental Championship: Roddy Piper (c) vs. The Repo Man; The Undertaker (w/Paul Bearer) vs. The British Bulldog; Rick Martel vs. Big Boss Man; Lord Alfred Hayes interviews Ric Flair; Lord Alfred Hayes interviews Hulk Hogan; 20 Man Over the Top Rope Battle Royal
61	July 23, 2008	August 22, 1987	Tito Santana vs. Ron Bass; WWF Intercontinental Championship Lumberjack Match: The Honky Tonk Man (c) (w/Jimmy Hart) vs. Ricky Steamboat; Gorilla Monsoon interviews The Junkyard Dog and George Steele; Lord Alfred Hayes interviews Demolition; Demolition (Ax and Smash) vs. The Junkyard Dog and George Steele
62	July 23, 2008	January 21, 1980	Hulk Hogan (w/Fred Blassie) vs. Dominic DeNucci; WWF Tag Team Championship: Tito Santana and Ivan Putski (c) vs. The Wild Samoans (Afa and Sika); WWF Championship: Bob Backlund (c) (w/Arnold Skaaland) vs. Ken Patera
63	July 30, 2008	December 28, 1989	No Disqualification Match: Jake Roberts vs. Ted DiBiase; WWF Tag Team Championship: The Colossal Connection (André the Giant and Haku) (c) (w/Bobby Heenan) vs. Demolition (Ax and Smash); Sean Mooney interviews Rick Rude and Bobby Heenan; Sean Mooney interviews Roddy Piper; Steel Cage Match: Roddy Piper vs. Rick Rude (w/Bobby Heenan)
64	July 30, 2008	August 25, 1986	Paul Orndorff (w/Bobby Heenan) vs Corporal Kirchner; Big John Studd and King Kong Bundy (w/Bobby Heenan) vs. The Machines (Big and Super Machine) (w/Giant Machine); Gorilla Monsoon interviews Randy Savage; WWF Intercontinental Championship: Randy Savage (c) (w/Miss Elizabeth) vs. Pedro Morales; WWF Tag Team Championship: The British Bulldogs (c) (The Dynamite Kid and Davey Boy Smith) (w/Lou Albano) vs. Hoss Funk and Jimmy Jack Funk (w/Jimmy Hart)
65	August 13, 2008	SummerSlam 1991; August 26, 1991	The Dragon, The Texas Tornado, and The British Bulldog vs. The Warlord and Power and Glory (Hercules and Paul Roma) (w/Slick); Sean Mooney interviews Mr. Perfect and Coach; WWF Intercontinental Championship: Mr. Perfect (c) (w/Coach) vs. Bret Hart; Sean Mooney interviews Ted DiBiase and Sensational Sherri; Million Dollar Championship: Ted DiBiase (c) (w/Sensational Sherri) vs. Virgil
66	August 13, 2008	SummerSlam 1991; August 26, 1991	Jailhouse Match: The Big Boss Man vs. The Mountie (w/Jimmy Hart); Sean Mooney interviews The Nasty Boys and Jimmy Hart; WWF Tag Team Championship No Disqualification Match: The Nasty Boys (c) (w/Jimmy Hart) vs. The Legion of Doom; Gene Okerlund interviews Special Guest Referee Sid Justice; Gene Okerlund interviews Hulk Hogan and The Ultimate Warrior; WWF Champion Hulk Hogan and The Ultimate Warrior vs. Sgt. Slaughter, Gen. Adnan and Col. Mustafa
67	August 20, 2008	December 30, 1988	Sean Mooney interviews The Powers of Pain and Mr. Fuji; WWF Tag Team Championship No Disqualification Match: Demolition (c) (Ax and Smash) vs. The Powers of Pain (The Warlord and The Barbarian) (w/ Mr. Fuji); Greg Valentine vs. Ronnie Garvin; WWF Championship: Randy Savage (c) (w/Miss Elizabeth) vs. Bad News Brown
68	August 20, 2008	September 26, 1977	Vince McMahon interviews Bob Backlund; Bob Backlund vs. Larry Sharpe; WWWF Championship: Billy Graham (c) (w/The Grand Wizard) vs. Dusty Rhodes; Peter Maivia vs. George Steele
69	August 27, 2008	The Brawl to End it All; July 23, 1984	WWF Championship: Hulk Hogan (c) vs. Greg Valentine (w/Lou Albano); WWF Tag Team Championship: Dick Murdoch and Adrian Adonis (c) vs. Sgt. Slaughter and Terry Daniels; WWF Women's Championship: The Fabulous Moolah (c) (w/Lou Albano) vs. Wendi Richter (w/Cyndi Lauper and Dave Wolfe); Gene Okerlund interviews new Women's Champion Wendi Richter and Cyndi Lauper after the match
70	August 27, 2008	October 28, 1989	King's Crown: Randy Savage (w/Sensational Sherri) vs. Jim Duggan; Sean Mooney interviews Mr. Perfect; Mr. Perfect vs. Jimmy Snuka; Sean Mooney interviews André the Giant and Bobby Heenan; Intercontinental Championship: The Ultimate Warrior (c) vs. André the Giant
71	September 3, 2008	December 30, 1985	Adrian Adonis vs. Lanny Poffo; WWF Championship: Hulk Hogan (c) vs. Randy Savage (w/Miss Elizabeth); Jim Brunzell vs. Bret Hart; Gorilla Monsoon interviews The Dream Team and Johnny Valiant; WWF Tag Team Championship: The Dream Team (Greg Valentine and Brutus Beefcake) (c) (w/Johnny Valiant) vs. Hillbilly Jim and Uncle Elmer
72	September 3, 2008	September 21, 1990	Sgt. Slaughter vs. Nikolai Volkoff; The Barbarian (w/Bobby Heenan) vs. Tito Santana; Jim Duggan vs. Rick Rude (w/Bobby Heenan); WWF Champion The Ultimate Warrior and The Legion of Doom (Hawk and Animal) vs. Demolition (Ax, Smash and Crush)
73	September 10, 2008	March 24, 1980	Larry Zbyszko vs. Bruno Sammartino (w/Arnold Skaaland); WWF Championship: Bob Backlund (c) vs. Wild Samoan No. 2 (w/Lou Albano); Hulk Hogan (w/Fred Blassie) vs. WWF Tag Team Champion Tito Santana
74	September 10, 2008	September 21, 1987	The Islanders (Haku and Tama) (w/Bobby Heenan) vs. Strike Force (Rick Martel and Tito Santana); WWF Championship: Hulk Hogan (c) vs. The One Man Gang (w/Slick); Gorilla Monsoon interviews Randy Savage; Randy Savage (w/Miss Elizabeth) vs. Intercontinental Champion The Honky Tonk Man
75	September 17, 2008	November 24, 1990	Earthquake (w/Jimmy Hart) vs. Hulk Hogan; Intercontinental Championship: The Texas Tornado (c) vs. Mr. Perfect; WWF Tag Team Champion Bret Hart vs. The Barbarian; The Rockers (Shawn Michaels and Marty Jannetty) vs. Demolition (Smash and Crush)
76	September 17, 2008	December 28, 1982	Intercontinental Championship: Pedro Morales (c) vs. The Magnificent Muraco; WWF Championship Lumberjack Match: Bob Backlund (c) vs. Billy Graham; Jimmy Snuka (w/Buddy Rogers) vs. Ray Stevens (w/Lou Albano and Fred Blassie)

== See also ==
- WWF on MSG Network
- MSG Network
- World Wrestling Entertainment
