= WWF on MSG Network =

Series of World Wrestling Federation television specials

- Genre: Professional wrestling
- Created by: Vincent J. McMahon
- Starring: World Wrestling Federation roster
- Country of origin: United States
- Original language: English

Production
- Production company: World Wrestling Federation

Original release
- Network: MSG Network
- Release: August 7, 1976 – March 16, 1997

Related
- WWE MSG Classics

WWF on MSG Network (also advertised as WWF from Madison Square Garden) was a professional wrestling television program produced by the World Wrestling Federation (WWF). It was a monthly television special that aired live from Madison Square Garden on the MSG Network from August 7, 1976, to March 16, 1997. The program featured live wrestling matches and interviews with WWF wrestlers. Updates of current feuds and several major title changes also took place on the show.

As of May 2022, 44 of the 151 total episodes are currently on the WWE Network, listed in the WWE Old School playlist.

== History ==
World Wide Wrestling Federation (WWWF) began airing their monthly television special WWWF on MSG Network on August 7, 1976, after several years of airing their monthly Madison Square Garden shows on HBO. Several notable title changes took place on the show including Bob Backlund winning his first WWWF World Heavyweight Championship by defeating Superstar Billy Graham on February 20, 1978. The show was renamed WWF on MSG Network after the promotion changed its name to "World Wrestling Federation" in March 1979. The show was an important event and equivalent to today's pay-per-view events. Many important matches and storyline developments took place on the show, for example, Hulk Hogan's rise to stardom began on the show when he defeated The Iron Sheik to capture his first WWF Championship on January 23, 1984. With the rise of Hogan's popularity and WWF's national expansion, the show lost its significance following the first pay-per-view event WrestleMania in 1985. With the addition of more pay-per-view events and the introduction of Saturday Night's Main Event as a nationally televised monthly special, the WWF on MSG Network was discontinued after 1992. WWF aired one final event on the MSG Network on March 16, 1997.

=== Title changes ===
WWF on MSG Network had many notable title changes.

- Bob Backlund defeated Superstar Billy Graham to win the WWWF World Heavyweight Championship on February 20, 1978
- Bob Backlund defeated Bobby Duncum in a Texas Deathmatch to win the vacant WWF Championship on December 17, 1979
  - Backlund had lost the title to Antonio Inoki on November 30 in Japan, but after a controversial rematch on December 6 in Japan, the title was vacated. Neither match was acknowledged on US television. The match against Duncum was referred to on US television as a title defense, even though Backlund was not introduced as champion, nor did he wear the belt during his entrance.
- Ken Patera defeated Pat Patterson to win the WWF Intercontinental Championship on April 21, 1980
- Pedro Morales defeated Don Muraco to win the WWF Intercontinental Championship on November 23, 1981
- Bob Backlund defeated Greg Valentine to win the vacant WWF Championship on November 23, 1981
  - The title was vacated on October 19 when Backlund had successfully defended the title against Valentine but the dazed referee awarded the title to Valentine. The title controversy was not recognized outside New York City and WWF continued to recognize Backlund as champion outside New York City. WWE officially does not recognize this title vacancy and Backlund's reign is recognized uninterrupted.
- Don Muraco defeated Pedro Morales to win the WWF Intercontinental Championship on January 22, 1983
- The Iron Sheik defeated Bob Backlund in a Throw in the Towel match to win the WWF Championship on December 26, 1983
- Hulk Hogan defeated The Iron Sheik to win the WWF Championship on January 23, 1984
- Akira Maeda defeated Pierre Lefebvre to win the WWF International Heavyweight Championship on March 25, 1984
- Wendi Richter defeated The Fabulous Moolah to win the WWF Women's Championship on July 23, 1984
- The Cobra defeated Black Tiger to win the WWF Junior Heavyweight Championship on December 28, 1984
- Leilani Kai defeated Wendi Richter to win the WWF Women's Championship on February 18, 1985
- Spider Lady (The Fabulous Moolah) defeated Wendi Richter to win the WWF Women's Championship on November 25, 1985

== Legacy ==
Although WWF discontinued live wrestling shows on the MSG Network, WWE began airing a new television show in 2006 called the MSG Classics which featured clips and matches from WWF's house shows at Madison Square Garden and the show aired on the MSG Network from 2006 to 2009.
