= Jake Milliman =

American professional wrestler (born 1947)

Personal information
- Born: 1947 (age 78–79) Milwaukee, Wisconsin, U.S.

Professional wrestling career
- Ring name(s): Jack Milliman; Jake Milliman
- Billed height: 5 ft 6 in (1.68 m)
- Billed weight: 246 lb (112 kg)
- Debut: 1981
- Retired: 2016

Jake Milliman is an American professional wrestler. He is best known for his appearances with the American Wrestling Association and the World Wrestling Federation in the 1980s.

== Professional wrestling career ==
=== American Wrestling Association (1982–1986) ===
Making his debut in the American Wrestling Association during the early 1980s, he lost to Ken Patera in one of his earliest appearances in the promotion on November 29. During the next month, he would lose to Hulk Hogan in a handicap match with Chris Curtis on December 6 and, with Tom Stone, in a rematch on December 12, 1981. He lost several single matches to Jerry Blackwell, Brad Rheingans, Rene Goulet, Bobby Duncum Sr. and manager Bobby "The Brain" Heenan as well as tag team matches with "Sodbuster" Kenny Jay against Ken Patera & Bobby Duncum Sr. and Sheik Adnan & Jerry Blackwell during late 1982.

Absent from the promotion during early 1983, he lost to Nick Bockwinkel and Ken Patera although he later teamed with Wahoo McDaniel to defeat Blackjack Lanza and Jesse Ventura by disqualification on May 15. However, he would continue losing single matches with losses against Chris Markoff, Mr. Saito and Brad Rheingans and, teaming with Sonny Rogers, lost to Ken Patera & Jerry Blackwell on May 29. He would also appear on an event for the Indianapolis-based World Wrestling Association losing to Rooster Griffen and, teaming with Bob Harmon, losing to Jerry Valiant & Great Abdullah later during the main event on August 6, 1983.

His losing streak would continue into the following year losing to Brad Rheingans, Jerry Blackwell, Curt Hennig, Larry Zbyszko, Billy Robinson, Nick Bockwinkel and The Crusher in early 1984. He also teamed with Tony Leone against Greg Gagne & Jim Brunzell as well as with Jesse "The Body" Ventura, Steven Regal, Kevin Kelly facing The Fabulous Freebirds in several tag team matches. He would also wrestle against Thomas Ivey at an NWA Central States event in Kansas City, Missouri on June 23, 1984.

A regular on All Star Wrestling, the AWA's weekly ESPN television program, he would appear on its first episode facing Scott Hall in his debut match at Chicago's UIC Pavilion on July 8, 1984. During the match, he was pinned by Hall due to outside interference by Larry "The Ax" Hennig and his son Curt being hit with a steel chair allowing Hall to take the pinfall.

In early 1986, Milliman defeating Larry Zbyszko in Rockford, Illinois on January 11 although he lost to The Barbarian & The Mongolian Stomper in a tag team match that same night with Rick Ganter. Losing to Zbyszko in a rematch on January 19, he also lost matches to Marty Jannetty, Colonel DeBeers, Boris Zukhov, Earthquake Ferris and Ken Timbs.

=== World Wrestling Federation (1987–1989) ===
After a brief stint in World Wrestling Federation during mid 1987 as "Jack Milliman", appearing on WWF Superstars of Wrestling facing Adrian Adonis in Adonis's last televised appearance following WrestleMania III on April 23, 1987. He later took part in a handicap match with Arthur Washington against One Man Gang on August 29 and in a 6-man tag team with Sivi Afi and Jerry Allen against One Man Gang, Butch Reed and Nikolai Volkoff on October 10. Milliman returned to the AWA.

In 1989, Milliman returned to the WWF losing to Tito Santana in Duluth, Minnesota on May 17 before teaming with Boris Zhukov losing to The Hart Foundation on July 9 and, with Tom Stone, on August 27. In his last appearance with the WWF, he and Zhukov lost a tag team match to Demolition on WWF Superstars on September 9, 1989.

=== American Wrestling Association (1989–1990) ===
Returning to the AWA in late 1989, Milliman defeated Todd Becker at SuperClash IV on April 8, 1990. However, his most famous match was one with Col. DeBeers, known as the "Great American Turkey Hunt". The match was part of the AWA Team Challenge Series, where the wrestler who got a stuffed, uncooked turkey off of the top of a pole first would win. In what was considered at the time a major upset, Milliman took the turkey from DeBeers when the referee's back was turned and was declared the winner. The match took place in a TV studio without an audience (the announcers claimed it was in an effort to stop wrestlers from interfering, but it was actually due to poor ticket sales).

Milliman also participated in the final match in the TCS. That match was a royal rumble-style battle royal featuring Brad Rheingans, Col. DeBeers, The Trooper, The Destruction Crew (Mike Enos & Wayne Bloom), the Texas Hangmen and others. Milliman again came away with the win by eliminating DeBeers at the end, winning the Series and supposed $1,000,000 check for his team Larry's Legends.

=== Late career (1995–present) ===
In 2001, Millman made an appearance wrestling against Rocky Stone in a charity event to raise money for the Waukesha's Valley of the Kings animal sanctuary on March 24. He and Tom Stone would later reunite to defeat Daryk St. Holmes, Esq. & Brad Hunter at a NAWF Pro Wrestling event in Jefferson, Wisconsin on December 14, 2001.

He has since wrestled in various independent promotions making an appearance with former UFC competitor Adrian Serrano at an event for Brew City Wrestling in March 2004 and the following year at the National Federation of Wrestling supercard Rumble in the Wolves Den: Part 2 on May 1, 2005

In 2007, he teamed with Jan Jones in a 6-man tag team match against Tough Tom and Trevor Adonis for an IAW event in Eagle, Wisconsin on September 1, 2007. The following month, in AWA Superstars of Wrestling, Milliman and Frankie DeFalco entered an 18-team championship tournament for the AWA World Tag Team Championship defeating Rocky Styles and Matt Mangle, and Team Vision (Chasyn Rance & Mister Saint Laurent) to advancing to the semi-finals where they lost to the Heartbreak Express (Phil and Sean Davis) in Shawano, Wisconsin on October 6, 2007. DeFalco and Milliman won the titles from the Heartbreak Express on February 8, 2008 in Waukesha, Wisconsin, but were stripped of the titles on February 25 in a Dusty finish as DeFalco was retroactively disqualified for throwing a member of the Heartbreak Express over the top rope.

On August 30, 2016, WWE paid homage to Milliman, on SmackDown! Live, debuting an enhancement talent by the name of Gary "The Milkman" Millman, portrayed by Texas independent wrestler Jason Erra.
