= SuperClash IV =

Professional wrestling show

- Promotion: American Wrestling Association
- Date: April 8, 1990
- City: Saint Paul, Minnesota
- Venue: Saint Paul Civic Center
- Attendance: 2,000

SuperClash chronology
← Previous; SuperClash III	Next → —

SuperClash IV was the fourth and final SuperClash professional wrestling supercard event promoted by the American Wrestling Association (AWA) and was held at the Saint Paul Civic Center in St. Paul, Minnesota on April 8, 1990. In September 2019 the event was added to the WWE Network as a hidden gem.

Seven matches were contested at the event. In the main event, The Trooper and Paul Diamond defeated The Destruction Crew (Mike Enos and Wayne Bloom) in a steel cage match, with Bob Lurtsema serving as the special guest referee. Also at the event, Larry Zbyszko defeated the defending champion Mr. Saito to win the AWA World Heavyweight Championship, with Nick Bockwinkel serving as the special guest referee.

== Event ==
=== Preliminary matches ===
The event kicked off with a match between Jake Milliman and Todd Becker. Milliman pinned Becker with a sunset flip for the win.

Next, Brad Rheingans and D.J. Peterson took on Texas Hangmen (Killer and Psycho). Texas Hangmen pulled an illegal switch during the match and Killer pinned Peterson with a cradle for the win.

In the following match, Junkyard Dog was supposed to wrestle Col. DeBeers but JYD could not compete due to a knee injury. As a result, he was replaced by Baron von Raschke. DeBeers' manager Sheik Adnan Al-Kaissie interfered in the match by preventing Raschke from applying a clawhold on DeBeers by hitting Raschke with the briefcase. The action spilled to the outside where Raschke applied a clawhold on Adnan. DeBeers tried to take advantage of the distraction and attack Raschke but Raschke applied a clawhold on DeBeers as well. Raschke managed to enter the ring before the referee's ten-count and DeBeers was counted out.

Later, Tommy Jammer took on Tully Blanchard. Blanchard's manager Christopher Love tripped Jammer from the leg as Jammer tried to deliver a suplex to Blanchard from the ring apron into the ring. As a result, Blanchard fell on top of Jammer and pinned him for the win while Love caught Jammer's leg. Blanchard attacked Jammer after the match by delivering an atomic drop and repeatedly hit his knee with a steel chair.

Next, Yukon John Nord took on Kokina Maximus in a lumberjack match. After fending off interference by the lumberjacks and Maximus' manager Sheik Adnan Al-Kassie, Nord hit Maximus with a briefcase and pinned him for the win.

It was followed by the penultimate match, in which Mr. Saito defended the AWA World Heavyweight Championship against Larry Zbyszko. Nick Bockwinkel served as the special guest referee. Saito delivered a Saito Suplex to Zbyszko with a bridge pin but Zbyszko raised his shoulder up at the two count while Saito's shoulder remained down and he was pinned. As a result, Zbyszko won the World Heavyweight Championship.

=== Main event match ===
The main event was a steel cage match, in which The Destruction Crew (Mike Enos and Wayne Bloom) took on The Trooper and Paul Diamond. Bob Lurtsema served as the special guest referee. Lurtsema was taken out by the Destruction Crew and they delivered a Destruction Device to Trooper and covered him for the pinfall but Lurtsema refused to count the pinfall. He tossed Bloom into the cage, delivered a leg drop to Bloom, and put Trooper on top of Bloom for the pinfall. Lurtsema was attacked by Destruction Crew and Tully Blanchard after the match.

== Reception ==
SuperClash IV received negative reviews from critics. According to Arnold Furious, the event was "orth watching just to see AWA in 1990 but that’s it. There’s nothing good." However, he praised the World Heavyweight Championship contest as match of the night with "the best in-ring work of the entire show." He also praised the steel cage main event as "pretty good if you can ignore the NFL guy (Bob Lurtsema)."

Scott Keith also panned the event, criticizing the quality of the event as indication of the promotion's imminent demise. He stated that it was "just kind of a sad circle down the drain for a once-great promotion, as this show very much demonstrates."

== Aftermath ==
The post-match brawl after the main event at SuperClash IV led to a six-man tag team match at Twin Wars '90, where Bob Lurtsema teamed with Brad Rheingans and The Trooper to defeat Tully Blanchard and Destruction Crew in a six-man tag team match.

== Results ==
No.	Results	Stipulations	Times
1	Jake Milliman defeated Todd Becker	Singles match	04:25
2	Texas Hangmen (Killer and Psycho) defeated Brad Rheingans and D.J. Peterson	Tag team match	12:11
3	Baron von Raschke defeated Col. DeBeers (with Sheik Adnan Al-Kaissie) by count out	Singles match	08:40
4	Tully Blanchard defeated Tommy Jammer	Singles match	16:02
5	Yukon John Nord defeated Kokina Maximus (with Sheik Adnan Al-Kaissie)	Lumberjack match	06:55
6	Larry Zbyszko defeated Mr. Saito (c) (with Riki Choshu)	Singles match for the AWA World Heavyweight Championship with Nick Bockwinkel as special guest referee	16:01
7	The Trooper and Paul Diamond defeated The Destruction Crew (Mike Enos and Wayne Bloom)	Steel Cage match with Bob Lurtsema as special guest referee	24:52
(c) / – the champion(s) heading into the match

== See also ==
- 1990 in professional wrestling
