= Nailz =

American professional wrestler

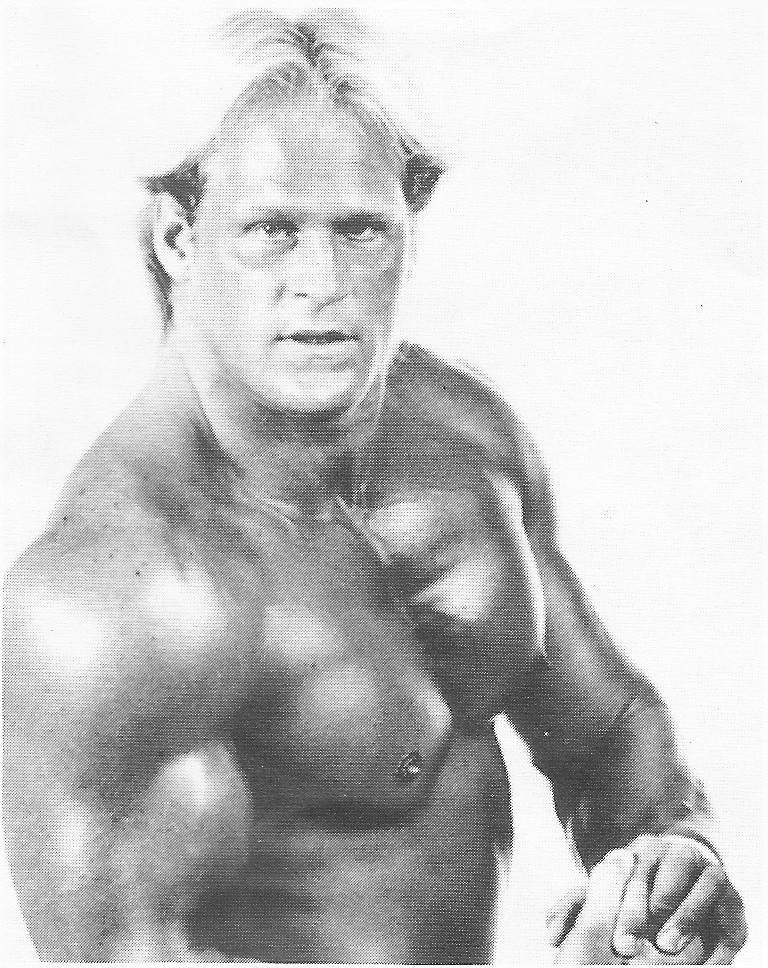
- Wacholz, circa 1988

Personal information
- Born: Kevin Patrick Wacholz; April 17, 1958 (age 68) Bloomington, Minnesota, U.S.

Professional wrestling career
- Ring name(s): The Convict; Kevin Kelly; Kevin the Magnificent; Nailz; The Prisoner; Thor
- Billed height: 6 ft 5 in (196 cm)
- Billed weight: 302 lb (137 kg)
- Billed from: Oakland, California; Dept. of Corrections (as Nailz)
- Trained by: Brad Rheingans
- Debut: 1983
- Retired: 2001

Kevin Patrick Wacholz (born April 17, 1958) is an American retired professional wrestler. He is best known for his appearances with the World Wrestling Federation (WWF) in 1992 under the ring name Nailz. He is also known for his appearances with the American Wrestling Association (AWA) in the 1980s as "Mr. Magnificent" Kevin Kelly.

== Early life ==
Kevin Patrick Wacholz was born on April 17, 1958, in Bloomington, Minnesota. Before becoming a professional wrestler, he tried out for the Dallas Cowboys of the National Football League (NFL) as a linebacker.

== Professional wrestling career ==
=== Early career (1983–1988) ===
Wacholz began his professional wrestling career in 1983 after winning a Toughman Contest. In 1985, he wrestled for Bill Watts' Mid-South Wrestling and World Class Championship Wrestling (WCCW) in Texas under the ring name Thor. He also wrestled for Bob Geigel's Central States Wrestling (CSW) the following year as Kevin The Magnificent. In June 1988, he defeated Billy Jack Haynes to win the Oregon Wrestling Federation (OWF) Heavyweight Championship, which he held until the promotion closed the following month.

=== American Wrestling Association (1984–1988) ===
Wacholz made his debut for Verne Gagne's American Wrestling Association (AWA) as a babyface under the ring name Kevin Kelly in March 1984. In his first match, he teamed with Steve Regal to defeat Brad Rheingans and Tom Stone. By 1986, he adopted the moniker "Mr. Magnificent" and became a top heel, challenging for the AWA World Heavyweight Championship and acquiring Sherri Martel as a manager. He also regularly issued arm wrestling challenges, leading to a feud with Tommy Rich, who answered one of his challenges on an edition of AWA Championship Wrestling on ESPN. Rich appeared to have the contest won, when Martel interfered on Kelly's behalf. In retaliation, Rich tore off her dress. Rich would then dominate a series of matches between the two. After Martel left the AWA, Kelly took Madusa Miceli as his manager and formed a tag team with Nick Kiniski, known as "The Perfect Tag Team". At SuperClash II on May 2, 1987, Kelly teamed with Buddy Wolfe and Doug Somers in a loss to The Midnight Rockers (Marty Jannetty and Shawn Michaels) and Ray Stevens. He left the AWA in February 1988, shortly after unsuccessfully challenging Curt Hennig for the AWA World Heavyweight Championship.

=== Japan (1986–1994) ===
Wacholz, as Kevin Kelly, made his first trip to Japan for New Japan Pro-Wrestling (NJPW) as part of the "Challenge Spirit" tour from August to September 1986, often teaming with Jerry Grey and Angel of Death and facing the likes of Yoshiaki Fujiwara, Seiji Sakaguchi and Akira Maeda. In June 1990, Kelly wrestled for Frontier Martial-Arts Wrestling (FMW), where he feuded with Dick Murdoch, but lost all matches involving the two.

He returned to NJPW as Nailz in August 1994 during the G1 Climax, where he lost to El Gigante. Two months later, he and Ron Simmons participated in the Super Grade Tag League. They finished the tournament with only four points, failing to advance to the semi-finals.

=== World Wrestling Federation (1989, 1991, 1992) ===
Wacholz, as Kevin Kelly, received a tryout match for the World Wrestling Federation (WWF) on June 6, 1989, at a WWF Superstars taping in Madison, Wisconsin, defeating Tim Horner. The next night, he defeated Jim Powers at a Wrestling Challenge taping, but was not signed to a contract. Wacholz received another tryout match at a Superstars taping on May 6, 1991, defeating Brian Costello. The following night at a Wrestling Challenge taping, he defeated Gary Jackson in a dark match.

==== Nailz (1992) ====
In early 1992, Wacholz returned to the WWF as Nailz, an ex-convict who, in a series of promos, alleged he was abused by former prison guard Big Boss Man during his incarceration. On the May 30 episode of Superstars, Nailz, clad in an orange prison jumpsuit, attacked Boss Man after his match, handcuffing him to the top rope before repeatedly hitting and choking him with his own nightstick; this angle was done to write Boss Man off television. Nailz easily defeated numerous jobbers over the following months, attacking them with Boss Man's nightstick after each match. In his pay-per-view debut, Nailz defeated Virgil using a sleeper hold at SummerSlam on August 29. The feud between Nailz and Boss Man culminated on November 25 at Survivor Series, where Nailz lost to Boss Man in a nightstick on a pole match.

Wacholz was released from his WWF contract after an incident on December 14, 1992, during a house show in Green Bay, Wisconsin, in which he attacked Vince McMahon in his office over a financial dispute. Bret Hart recalled in his autobiography that Wacholz "cornered Vince in his office and screamed at him for fifteen minutes". Hart claims he was just down the hall from the office when he heard a loud crash, which was Wacholz "knocking Vince over in his chair, choking him violently". Wacholz then filed a wrongful termination lawsuit, claiming he was sexually assaulted by McMahon. The WWF filed a counterclaim against Wacholz, however, both suits were later dropped. In 1994, Wacholz testified against McMahon during his trial on charges of supplying steroids to WWF wrestlers, claiming McMahon had told him to take steroids. Prior to his release, Wacholz was planned to feud with The Undertaker, with a staredown between the two being used as the cover of the January 1993 issue of WWF Magazine. Their feud would have culminated in an "electric chair match" at WrestleMania IX, in which Nailz would lose to the Undertaker and get "electrocuted".

=== World Championship Wrestling (1993, 1997–1998) ===
On May 23, 1993, Wacholz made his debut for World Championship Wrestling (WCW) at Slamboree as The Prisoner, with ring gear identical to his Nailz persona. He replaced Scott Norton, who no-showed the event, in a match against Sting, but lost.

He returned to WCW on two occasions, defeating Yuji Nagata in a dark match prior to WCW Monday Nitro on October 6, 1997, and Barry Darsow at a house show on April 17, 1998.

=== Later career (1993–2001) ===
On March 20, 1993, Nailz defeated Max Moon to win the World Wide Wrestling Alliance (WWWA) Heavyweight Championship. He held the title until April 16, 1994, when he lost it to Brutus Beefcake. He also wrestled briefly as The Convict, reigniting his feud with Big Boss Man on the independent circuit. However, the name was dropped due to a lawsuit from the WWF, claiming it was similar to the Nailz character.

In October 1993, Nailz started appearing for Pro Wrestling America, where he wrestled sporadically for the next four years. By November 1994, he also wrestled for the American Wrestling Federation (AWF), participating in a tournament for the AWF Heavyweight Championship that was won by Tito Santana. He last wrestled for the AWF at their "Pumpkin Brawl" show on October 19, 1996, where he and The Blacktop Bully fought Santana and Sgt. Slaughter to a no contest. Wacholz retired from professional wrestling in 2001.

== Championships and accomplishments ==
- Oregon Wrestling Federation
  - OWF Heavyweight Champion (1 time)
- World Wide Wrestling Alliance
  - WWWA Heavyweight Championship (1 time)
- Pro Wrestling Illustrated
  - PWI ranked him #78 of the top 500 singles wrestlers in the PWI 500 in 1992
  - PWI ranked him #336 of the top 500 singles wrestlers of the "PWI Years" in 2003
