= SummerSlam (1992) =

World Wrestling Federation pay-per-view event

- Promotional poster
- Promotion: World Wrestling Federation
- Date: August 29, 1992 (aired August 31, 1992)
- City: London, England
- Venue: Wembley Stadium
- Attendance: 78,927
- Tagline: The SummerSlam You Thought You'd Never See!

Pay-per-view chronology
← Previous; WrestleMania VIII	Next → Survivor Series

SummerSlam chronology
← Previous; 1991	Next → 1993

WWE in Europe chronology
← Previous; European Rampage Again Tour (Sheffield)	Next → European Rampage Again Tour (Stuttgart)

The 1992 SummerSlam was a professional wrestling pay-per-view (PPV) event produced by the American promotion World Wrestling Federation (WWF, renamed WWE in 2002). It was the fifth annual SummerSlam and took place on Saturday, August 29, 1992, at the original Wembley Stadium in London, England and aired on tape delay on Monday, August 31, 1992. It was the WWF's first PPV event to take place outside of North America.

The pay-per-view included two main event matches. At the time of the event, Ultimate Warrior challenging "Macho Man" Randy Savage for the WWF Championship was promoted as the top of the bill match. The Ultimate Warrior won the match by countout but did not win back the title as titles do not change hands by countout unless stipulated. Retrospectively, WWE recognizes "British Bulldog" Davey Boy Smith pinning Bret Hart to win the WWF Intercontinental Heavyweight Championship as having been the main event. The undercard also included The Natural Disasters (Earthquake and Typhoon) retaining the WWF Tag Team Championship over The Beverly Brothers (Beau and Blake), and Shawn Michaels and Rick Martel wrestling to a double countout in a match with the stipulation that the wrestlers were banned from hitting each other in the face.

The event had an attendance of 78,927. The company themselves claimed a disputed attendance of 80,355, which would make it their seventh-biggest event. It remains the highest attended wrestling event to take place in Europe. Between ticket prices and merchandise sales, the WWF made over $3,650,000 in revenue. Reviews of the event were almost all positive, with the Smith–Hart match rated as the best match in SummerSlam history.

== Production ==
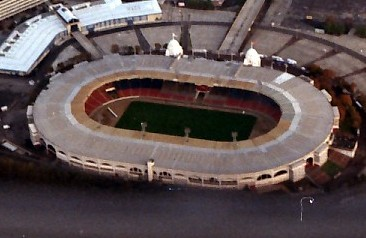
The fifth annual SummerSlam was held at the original Wembley Stadium in London, England, which was the World Wrestling Federation's first major pay-per-view event to be held outside of North America.

=== Background ===
SummerSlam is an annual professional wrestling pay-per-view (PPV) event produced every August by the American promotion World Wrestling Federation (WWF, renamed WWE in 2002) since 1988. Dubbed "The Biggest Party of the Summer", it is one of the promotion's original four PPVs, along with WrestleMania, Royal Rumble, and Survivor Series, referred to as the "Big Four". It has since become considered the WWF's second biggest event of the year behind WrestleMania.

Professional wrestling in the United Kingdom had achieved major mainstream popularity via television broadcasts on ITV since 1955, particularly on Saturday afternoons. From 1965 to 1985, it was part of the show World of Sport, featuring matches from dominant promotional cartel Joint Promotions. The WWF's first significant foothold in the British market came in January 1987 when it began providing "American special" editions for the standalone Wrestling show which succeeded the slot (which the WWF and Joint Promotions shared with opposition promotion All Star Wrestling.) Less than two months after ITV cancelled its wrestling coverage in December 1988, the WWF relaunched on new satellite channel Sky One and by October 1989 was running house shows in London and Birmingham. From spring 1991, the WWF and its main US rival World Championship Wrestling (WCW) regularly held successful national tours of the UK. The European Rampage Tour of October 1991, across numerous countries, quickly sold out, and the success was replicated by the European Rampage Again Tour of April 1992. Overall, by 1992, wrestling in the UK was at the peak of a boom in popularity, and the WWF remained one of Sky TV's highest rated broadcasts, and ITV effectively reinstated Saturday afternoon wrestling by scheduling WCW in the old slot.

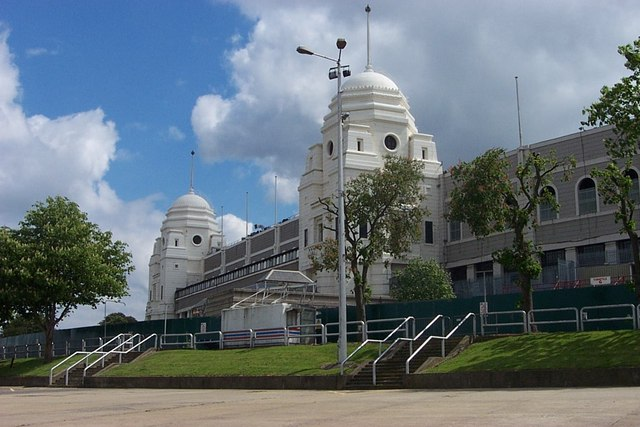
The Twin Towers at the original Wembley Stadium where the 1992 SummerSlam was held.

The fifth annual SummerSlam was originally intended to take place at the Capital Centre in Landover, Maryland. However, buoyed by the WWF's growing popularity in Europe and the possibility of increasing the revenue, Sean Mooney revealed on a Superstars of Wrestling taping that the event would take place in Europe, but a venue had not yet been decided. During a June 9 press conference, the WWF officially confirmed that SummerSlam would take place at Wembley Stadium in London, marking the WWF's first major PPV event to be held outside of North America. The event was scheduled to be held on Saturday, August 29, 1992, and it aired on tape delay on Monday, August 31. Shawn Michaels was originally booked to win the WWF Intercontinental Championship from Bret Hart, but the storyline was adjusted due to the change of venue. As a result, "The British Bulldog" Davey Boy Smith, a native of Golborne, a working-class town in the north of England, was chosen to win the title.

=== Storylines ===
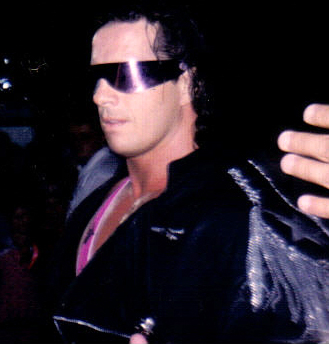
Bret Hart (pictured in 1994) defended the WWF Intercontinental Championship against his brother-in-law "The British Bulldog" Davey Boy Smith

One of the main events was the Intercontinental Championship match between Bret Hart and Davey Boy Smith, brothers-in-law in real life as Smith was married to Diana Hart, Bret's sister. On television broadcasts leading up to SummerSlam, interviews with Diana and her mother Helen portrayed the family as being torn apart by the upcoming match. Bruce Hart publicly supported Smith, while Owen Hart sided with his brother Bret. Diana stated that she did not know who she wanted to win the match, as she had close ties to both men. She ultimately stated that she simply hoped that neither wrestler would get hurt. Prior to the match, Smith was hospitalized with a legitimate staph infection in his knee. Despite the concerns about his health, he decided to wrestle the match as planned. Bret Hart later revealed in an interview that he doubted the legitimacy of the injury.

The other main event was a WWF Championship match between Ultimate Warrior and Randy Savage. Although they had a previous run of house show matches in early 1989, the rivalry between them began in earnest in the fall of 1990, when Sensational Sherri, who was managing Savage, tried to arrange a match between Savage and Warrior. The Warrior refused to defend his WWF Championship against Savage, and he ripped up a contract that Sherri had given him. While they faced each other at house shows over the next few months, where Savage was unable to win the title, they never had a televised match with each other. Savage then interfered in the title match at Royal Rumble 1991, enabling Sgt. Slaughter to win the title. To settle the rivalry, Savage and the Warrior agreed to face each other in a retirement match at WrestleMania VII. The Warrior won the match, forcing Savage into retirement. However, Savage would be reinstated as an active wrestler in November 1991. by which time the Warrior had left the WWF. The following year, the rivalry was rekindled when Ultimate Warrior, having returned to the WWF at WrestleMania VIII on April 5, 1992. was granted a shot at the WWF Championship, which Savage had won from Ric Flair earlier that same evening. Flair and his executive consultant Mr. Perfect, were upset that Flair had not been granted a rematch. They decided to cause trouble between Savage and the Warrior. In August, Perfect claimed that he was in negotiations with Savage and Warrior, who both had sought his managerial services, but refused to clarify which wrestler he would support at SummerSlam. At the SummerSlam Spectacular, a show designed to promote the pay-per-view, Savage and the Warrior teamed up to face The Nasty Boys. Perfect and Ric Flair interfered in the match, resulting in a count-out victory for the Nasty Boys and more animosity between Savage and Warrior.

The undercard included two tag team matches: Money Inc. (Ted DiBiase and Irwin R. Schyster) and The Legion of Doom (Hawk and Animal) had been feuding in 1992 over the WWF Tag Team Championship. The Legion of Doom held the championship belts until dropping the title to Money Inc. This title change occurred after Hawk failed a drug test and was suspended. Once Hawk's suspension ended, a rematch was scheduled to take place at SummerSlam. The match was first scheduled as a title match but Money Inc. lost the championship to The Natural Disasters.

Meanwhile, the Natural Disasters (Earthquake and Typhoon) and the Beverly Brothers (Beau Beverly and Blake Beverly) had a rivalry dating back to a match aired on WWF Prime Time Wrestling on July 20, 1992. While Earthquake brawled with Beau and Blake, Typhoon attacked the Beverlys' manager, The Genius. When the Disasters won the WWF Tag Team Championship, their SummerSlam match was transformed into a title match.

The rivalry between Shawn Michaels against Rick Martel centred around Martel's attempts to steal Michaels' manager Sensational Sherri. During one of Michaels' matches televised on August 9, 1992, Martel came to ringside and winked at Sherri, who returned the gesture. At the SummerSlam Spectacular, Sherri came to the ring during one of Martel's matches and winked at him. Both Michaels and Martel were "heel" wrestlers who bragged about their good looks, and Sherri had them agree not to hit each other in the face during their SummerSlam match.

== Event ==
=== Preliminary matches ===
Other on-screen personnel
Role:	Name:
Commentator	Vince McMahon
Commentator	Bobby Heenan
Interviewer	Lord Alfred Hayes
Interviewer	Sean Mooney
Interviewer	Gene Okerlund
Ring announcer	Howard Finkel
Referee	Mike Chioda
Referee	Danny Davis
Referee	Earl Hebner
Referee	Joey Marella

Before recording of the pay-per-view broadcast, two matches were taped for later showings on WWF Prime Time Wrestling. These matches were never advertised on US television in the weeks leading up to SummerSlam. The first match saw "Hacksaw" Jim Duggan and The Bushwhackers (Bushwhacker Luke and Bushwhacker Butch) defeat The Mountie and The Nasty Boys (Brian Knobs and Jerry Sags) when Duggan pinned The Mountie. In the other match, Papa Shango defeated Tito Santana by pinfall.

The actual pay-per-view opened with the Legion of Doom (Hawk and Animal) taking on Money Inc. (Ted DiBiase and Irwin R. Schyster). The Legion of Doom used their size and power to wear down their opponents in the opening minutes of the match. Money Inc. gained the advantage when Hawk missed a flying clothesline. Hawk tried to tag in his partner but was unable for several minutes because Money Inc. kept him away from the corner where Animal was standing. Eventually, Hawk and Schyster hit each other at the same time. Hawk tagged Animal in, and the Legion of Doom attempted the Doomsday device, their signature move. Schyster stopped them, but Animal hit Schyster in retaliation, causing Schyster to run into DiBiase. Animal then powerslammed DiBiase and pinned him to get the victory.

The second match of the broadcast pitted Nailz against Virgil. Nailz spent the majority of the match choking Virgil. Virgil recovered several times and performed several offensive maneuvers, but Nailz always regained the advantage. Ultimately, Nailz won the match by performing a sleeper hold. After the match, he attacked Virgil with a nightstick.

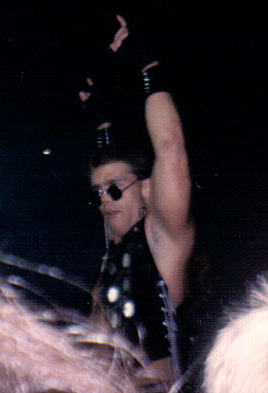
Shawn Michaels (pictured in 1994) fought Rick Martel in order to win the affection of Sensational Sherri

In the following match, competitors Shawn Michaels and Rick Martel were unable, due to a pre-match stipulation, to hit each other in the face. The two men exchanged holds but were both preoccupied with looking to ringside for approval from Sensational Sherri. Martel gained the advantage by throwing Michaels to the outside of the ring and attacking him there. When the two returned to the ring, they took turns attempting to pin their opponent, pulling down their opponent's wrestling tights to reveal their buttocks each time. Michaels then kicked Martel and tried to pin him, but the referee stopped the three-count because Michaels' feet were on the ropes. Both wrestlers broke the pre-match stipulation by slapping each other in the face. Sherri pretended to faint, which drew the attention of both wrestlers. Michaels and Martel argued over who would carry Sherri backstage, with each man carrying her a few feet before being stopped by his opponent. Both wrestlers were counted out, but they continued to argue. Martel tried to revive Sherri by throwing a bucket of water over her head. Michaels dropped Sherri and chased Martel backstage; upset at being publicly humiliated and then left behind by both men, Sherri screamed and cried as she ran backstage.

The tag team championship match came next, which saw the Beverly Brothers (Beau Beverly and Blake Beverly) attack the Natural Disasters (Earthquake and Typhoon) before the bell. The Disasters used their size and strength to gain the advantage, but Earthquake accidentally performed an avalanche on Typhoon. The Beverlys controlled the match for several minutes, with Blake executing a splash and a front facelock. Typhoon recovered and clotheslined both opponents but was unable to tag in Earthquake. Later, Typhoon tried to tag again, but Beau distracted Earthquake; while the referee's back was turned, The Beverlys' manager, The Genius handed Blake a metal scroll, which Blake used to hit Typhoon. Typhoon recovered, however, and Earthquake entered the ring and controlled the remainder of the match. He performed a powerslam on Beau before pinning him with an Earthquake splash.

The following match, which was not broadcast in the United Kingdom, pitted Crush against the Repo Man. Crush used his size advantage to perform a Gorilla press slam on Repo Man. Repo Man performed a back suplex, but Crush showed no sign that the move affected him. Crush continued to dominate the match with such moves as a belly to belly suplex. Repo Man eventually tried to attack Crush by jumping off the top rope, but Crush caught him and performed the Cranium Crunch to win the match by submission.

=== Main event matches ===
One of the two main event matches came next, as Randy Savage defended the WWF World Heavyweight Championship against the Ultimate Warrior. Although Mr. Perfect had claimed that he would be in the corner of one of the competitors, he did not come to ringside for the beginning of the match. Savage and the Warrior traded the advantage back and forth, with Savage performing several clotheslines and punching his opponent and the Ultimate Warrior countering with atomic drops. Savage executed two double axe handles from the top rope, but the Warrior caught him when Savage attempted the move a third time. After the Warrior missed a move and fell outside the ring, Savage jumped from the top rope and performed another double axe handle. Once the wrestlers got back into the ring, Ric Flair and Mr. Perfect walked down the aisle and stood at ringside. The match continued as normal until Perfect reached into the ring and tripped Savage, who was running to gain momentum for a maneuver. The Ultimate Warrior accidentally threw Savage into referee Earl Hebner. As a result of the ref bump, Hebner was not able to make the three-count when Savage pinned the Warrior after performing a diving elbow drop. Perfect and Flair revived the Ultimate Warrior, only to attack him when he stood up. The Warrior recovered and attempted a running splash, but Flair hit him with a chair. Savage saw the Warrior injured and realized that Flair and Perfect were causing trouble rather than trying to help either man. In retaliation, Savage jumped off the top rope to attack Flair, but Flair hit him in the leg with a chair. Savage was unable to get back into the ring, so the Ultimate Warrior won the match via countout. Flair and Perfect continued to attack Savage until the Warrior chased them away. Savage and the Ultimate Warrior then hugged and walked backstage together.

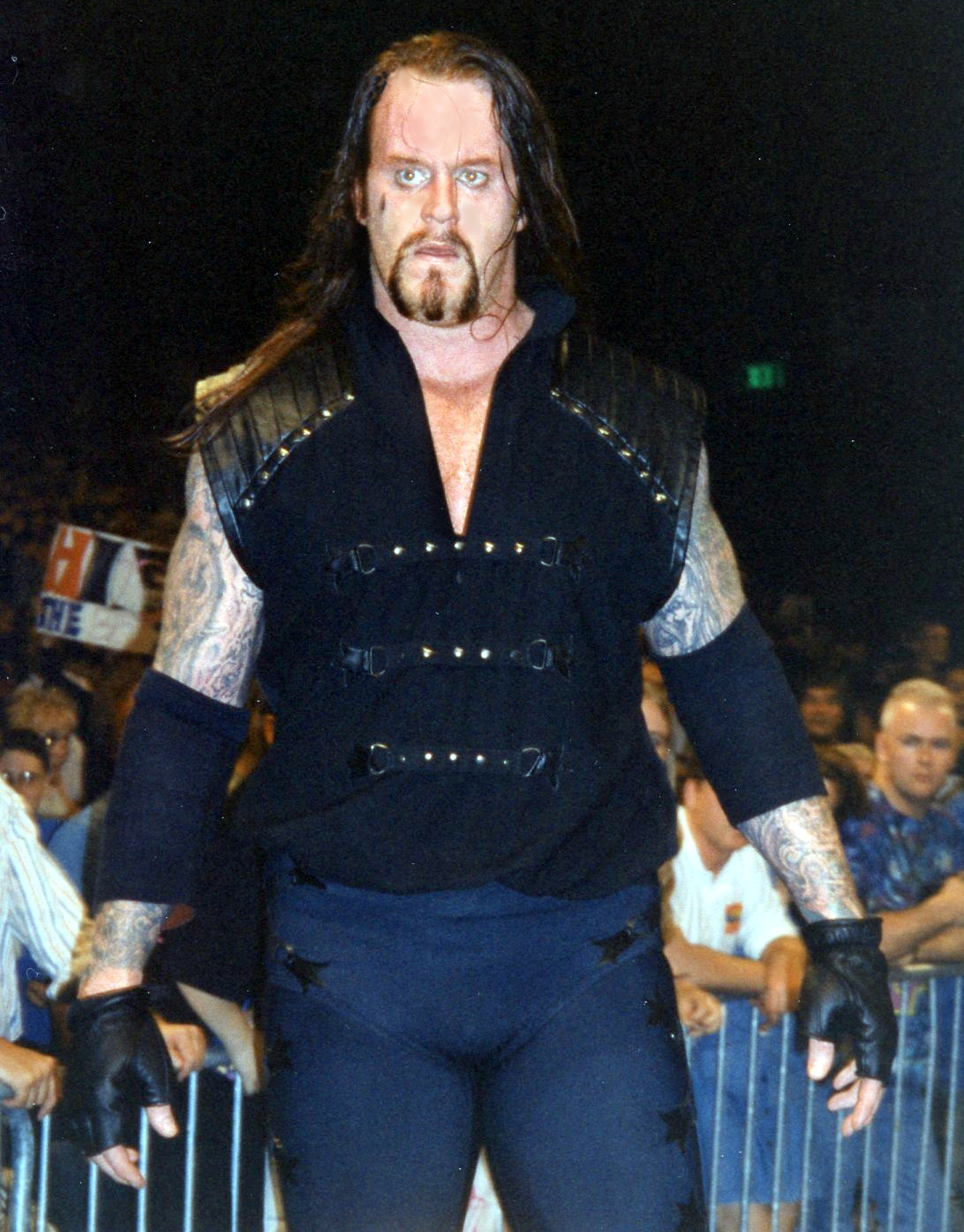
The Undertaker (pictured in 1997) defeated Kamala by disqualification

The next match pitted the Undertaker against Kamala, who was accompanied by his manager, Harvey Wippleman, and his handler, Kim Chee. Kamala attacked before the match but the Undertaker blocked the attack and punched Kamala repeatedly before performing a chop from the top rope on his opponent. The Undertaker attempted the same move again, but Wippleman knocked the Undertaker off the rope. Kamala knocked the Undertaker outside the ring, where the Undertaker attacked Wippleman and Kim Chee. Back inside the ring, the Undertaker gained the advantage by executing a chokeslam and a clothesline. When the Undertaker attempted his signature move, the Tombstone Piledriver, Kim Chee ran into the ring and hit the Undertaker with a pith helmet. As a result, Kamala was disqualified and the Undertaker won the match. Kamala kept on attacking and hit Undertaker with a series of splashes and seemingly left his opponent unconscious. When the Undertaker suddenly sat up and looked directly at the Ugandan Giant, Kamala, Wippleman and Kim Chee panicked and fled ringside with The Undertaker and Paul Bearer slowly walking in pursuit.

Next, Tatanka defeated The Berzerker by pinfall. This match was originally scheduled as part of the pay-per-view. Due to time constraints it was cut from the PPV lineup in post-production. The match, however, later aired on WWF Prime Time Wrestling. On the Silver Vision home video release in the UK, this match was placed after the WWF World Heavyweight Championship match. Up next, Rowdy Roddy Piper joined the Balmoral Highlanders in playing Scotland the Brave on the bagpipes.

The event concluded with the second main event, a contest for the Intercontinental Championship between champion Bret Hart and challenger "British Bulldog" Davey Boy Smith, who was accompanied by the reigning Commonwealth Heavyweight Boxing Champion, London native Lennox Lewis. In the opening minutes, Hart used his technical wrestling abilities and Smith relied on his power advantage. Hart got control of the match with a reverse atomic drop and a Samoan drop. Smith came back with a monkey flip, but Hart regained the advantage with a bulldog and a plancha. Smith eventually recovered and tried to pin Hart with a back slide. Hart escaped the pin attempt and wore Smith down with sleeper holds. Smith gained the advantage, however, and used power moves to control the match, including a running powerslam and a variety of suplexes. Hart managed to place Smith in the Sharpshooter, Hart's signature submission hold. Smith escaped the hold, however, and threw Hart against the ropes. While running back at Smith, Hart attempted a sunset flip. Smith countered the move and pinned Hart to win the Intercontinental Championship. Immediately after the match, Hart refused to shake Smith's hand. He soon changed his mind, however, and hugged Smith as well as Diana Hart, who was celebrating with her husband. Writing in his autobiography Hitman: My Real Life in the Cartoon World of Wrestling, Hart recalled that prior to the match, he had been unable to contact Smith to prepare for the match as Smith had spent the few weeks before the match smoking crack cocaine with Jim Neidhart.

== Reception ==
According to the WWF, the 80,355 people were in attendance for SummerSlam 1992, which at that time was behind only WrestleMania III in attendance (though has since been surpassed by future events). WrestleMania III was said to have attracted 93,173 crowd. However some observers place the attendance for WrestleMania III closer to 78,000, which makes the crowd for SummerSlam 1992 arguably the biggest verified crowd in WWF history until WrestleMania 29 in 2013.

The event has received positive reviews from a variety of sources. RD Reynolds has called it "a huge success". The atmosphere in the stadium was a big part of the event's success, with Tomás Cunha claiming the fans "elevate[d] everything to the next level". In particular, the Intercontinental Championship match has been called "one of the greatest matches of all time". Pro Wrestling Illustrated named it the Match of the Year in the magazine's year-end issue, and WWE has called the match the greatest moment in SummerSlam history. Bret Hart has also named it as his favorite match of all time. The match was then ranked at the top of WWE's list of "25 Greatest SummerSlam matches ever" on their YouTube channel.

The WWF collected $2,200,000 in revenue from admissions, up from $445,000 the previous year. The company also sold $1,456,203 in merchandise at SummerSlam, which is the largest amount of merchandise revenue at a WWF event. The buyrate for the event was 1.5, down from 2.7 at SummerSlam 1991 but higher than the 1.3 buyrate at SummerSlam 1993.

== Aftermath ==
Randy Savage, who continued to sell his supposedly injured leg, lost the title to Ric Flair at a television taping on September 1, 1992 in Hershey, Pennsylvania, (the day after the PPV broadcast and just three days after the live event.) During the match Flair received help not only from Mr Perfect but also from newcomer Razor Ramon, igniting a feud between Savage and Ramon. Bret Hart claimed in a 2014 interview that WWF owner Vince McMahon had worked out the title-change match with Flair and Savage beforehand, and that he was angry when they returned to the dressing room after the match because they had failed to do much of what was agreed upon. Hart reported - and Flair concurred - that McMahon was so angry that he actually sent Bobby Heenan out to signal that the match be aborted and then made them go straight back out and restart the whole match. Contemporary kayfabed reports also describe the match being restarted due to interference from Heenan. After producing much the same match that they had immediately prior, McMahon allegedly threw his headset onto the table and stormed off in frustration.

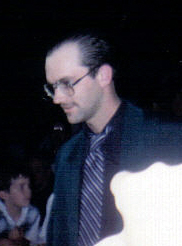
Harvey Wippleman (pictured in 1994) began his year-long feud with The Undertaker at SummerSlam 1992

WWF writers had originally planned that the Ultimate Warrior should be the one to accept Mr Perfect's services, turning heel in the process of winning the title and that, as new champion, he would further feud with Savage. After these plans were scrapped at a late stage due to the Warrior's refusal to turn heel after considering the collapse in merchandise sales which would have resulted, the two built on their replacement-booking burial of the hatchet, turning their new found alliance into a tag team, The Ultimate Maniacs and were scheduled to face Flair and Ramon at Survivor Series 1992. However, as the Warrior had been fired by the promotion on November 21 along with The British Bulldog, his spot was surprisingly offered to Mr. Perfect, who accepted it in spite of Flair, thereby turning face and initiating a feud with Flair which culminated in Flair leaving the WWF in January 1993.

Shawn Michaels, who had originally been booked to win the Intercontinental Championship from Bret Hart at SummerSlam, won the title from Davey Boy Smith on October 27 (the match would air on the November 14, 1992 episode of Saturday Night's Main Event XXXI). Michaels and Sherri continued their on-screen relationship after SummerSlam. Sherri claimed to have created the rivalry with Martel to test Michaels' love for her. Their relationship deteriorated, though when Michaels pulled Sherri in front of him to protect himself from an attack by his former tag team partner, Marty Jannetty on the October 31 episode of WWF Superstars. This led to confrontations between Sherri and Michaels at the 1993 Royal Rumble and WrestleMania IX.

Money Inc. regained the WWF Tag Team Championship from the Natural Disasters and defended the belts against the Ultimate Maniacs, retaining them on a countout loss. Until Warrior's dismissal it was planned that they would feud further for the belts.

The Undertaker continued to feud with Kamala and Harvey Wippleman. The two wrestlers faced each other again at Survivor Series 1992 in a coffin match, which the Undertaker won. Wippleman gained revenge by introducing Giant Gonzalez (and later Mr. Hughes), with whom the Undertaker feuded through 1993.

Upset about the amount of his pay for appearing at SummerSlam, Kevin Wacholz (Nailz) confronted WWF owner Vince McMahon after Survivor Series 1992. According to reports, he legitimately attacked McMahon. As a result, Nailz was fired from the WWF. He briefly appeared in rival promotion World Championship Wrestling (WCW) as the Prisoner but was released after the WWF sued WCW because of The Prisoner's similarity to the Nailz character. The anger between Wacholz and McMahon spilled over into McMahon's 1994 trial, in which McMahon was accused of distributing steroids to wrestlers. Although Wacholz testified against McMahon, his statements, which included, "I hate Vince McMahon's guts" ultimately proved harmful to the prosecution's case.

== Home media and streaming ==
SummerSlam 1992 was released on VHS format on September 24, 1992. The US release only included the eight matches shown on pay-per-view. In October 1992, Silver Vision released a version of the tape in the United Kingdom which included all eleven matches including the three dark matches. It would go on to be the biggest selling tape yet for the company.

On October 3, 2005 in the United Kingdom, the event was released on DVD, packaged together with SummerSlam 1993, as part of the WWE Tagged Classics line. The event was again later released as part of WWE's SummerSlam Anthology boxed DVD set. The anthology was released on August 5, 2008, in North America and was released on October 6, 2008 in the United Kingdom. However, the version that is included with the Anthology is only the 8 match PPV broadcast version.

On April 29, 2022, it was announced that a 30th anniversary DVD and Blu-ray would be released in Europe to celebrate the anniversary of the event on August 29, exactly 30 years to the event taking place. The release would also include all live event dark matches for the first time which are not a part of the WWE Network showing or on the previous release. During a WWE Live event at London's O2 Arena that same day, it was announced that WWE would return to the United Kingdom to host another major stadium event titled Clash at the Castle in September 2022.

The event was uploaded to the WWE Network streaming service on the platform's launch in 2014 and remained on the service until it was shut down. As of September 2026, subscribers in multiple territories, including the US and the UK, can stream the event on Netflix.

== Results ==
No.	Results	Stipulations	Times
1^{D}	Jim Duggan and The Bushwhackers (Luke and Butch) defeated The Mountie and The Nasty Boys (Brian Knobbs and Jerry Sags) (with Jimmy Hart) by pinfall	Six-man tag team match	12:33
2^{D}	Papa Shango defeated Tito Santana by pinfall	Singles match	6:00
3	The Legion of Doom (Hawk and Animal) (with Paul Ellering) defeated Money Inc. (Ted DiBiase and Irwin R. Schyster) (with Jimmy Hart) by pinfall	Tag team match	11:55
4	Nailz defeated Virgil by submission	Singles match	3:55
5	Rick Martel vs. Shawn Michaels (with Sensational Sherri) ended in a double countout	Singles match	8:06
6	The Natural Disasters (Earthquake and Typhoon) (c) defeated The Beverly Brothers (Beau and Blake) (with The Genius) by pinfall	Tag team match for the WWF Tag Team Championship	10:30
7	Crush defeated Repo Man by submission	Singles match	5:41
8	Ultimate Warrior defeated Randy Savage (c) by countout	Singles match for the WWF Championship	28:00
9	The Undertaker (with Paul Bearer) defeated Kamala (with Harvey Wippleman and Kim Chee) by disqualification	Singles match	3:27
10^{D}	Tatanka defeated The Berzerker (with Mr. Fuji) by pinfall	Singles match	5:46
11	The British Bulldog defeated Bret Hart (c) by pinfall	Singles match for the WWF Intercontinental Championship	25:40
(c) / – the champion(s) heading into the match; D / – this was a dark match

== See also ==
- 1992 in professional wrestling
- Professional wrestling in the United Kingdom
