= Survivor Series (1992) =

World Wrestling Federation pay-per-view event

- Promotional poster featuring the original advertised main event of Ultimate Warrior and Randy Savage vs. Ric Flair and Razor Ramon, with a Nightstick match of Big Boss Man vs. Nailz.
- Promotion: World Wrestling Federation
- Date: November 25, 1992
- City: Richfield Township, Ohio
- Venue: Richfield Coliseum
- Attendance: 18,000

Pay-per-view chronology
← Previous; SummerSlam	Next → Royal Rumble

Survivor Series chronology
← Previous; 1991	Next → 1993

The 1992 Survivor Series was a professional wrestling pay-per-view (PPV) event produced by the World Wrestling Federation (WWF, renamed WWE in 2002). It was the sixth annual Survivor Series event and took place on Thanksgiving Eve in the United States on Wednesday, November 25, 1992, at the Richfield Coliseum in Richfield Township, Ohio, which was the third time a Survivor Series was held there after the 1987 and 1988 events. The event was highlighted by the titular Survivor Series match, a tag team elimination match that typically pits teams of four or five wrestlers against each other.

In the final match on the card, Bret Hart retained his WWF Championship against Shawn Michaels. The card also included a highly promoted match in which the team of Randy Savage and Mr. Perfect defeated the team of Ric Flair and Razor Ramon by disqualification; Ultimate Warrior was advertised for the show but left the company and was replaced by Perfect. Also featured were two speciality matches: The Undertaker won a coffin match against Kamala, and The Big Boss Man defeated Nailz in a nightstick on a pole match. Unlike the prior five events, in which the card was entirely or almost entirely Survivor Series matches, only one Survivor Series match was held at the 1992 event where The Natural Disasters (Earthquake and Typhoon) and The Nasty Boys (Jerry Sags and Brian Knobbs) defeated Money Inc. (Ted DiBiase and Irwin R. Schyster) and The Beverly Brothers (Beau and Blake).

Some of the matches were changed after they were first announced, as several wrestlers left the WWF shortly before the event. The WWF Championship match and the main event tag team match won by Savage and Perfect both garnered praise.

== Production ==
The sixth annual Survivor Series was the third time for the event to be held at the Richfield Coliseum in Richfield Township, Ohio, after the 1987 and 1988 events.

=== Background ===
Survivor Series is an annual professional wrestling pay-per-view (PPV) event, produced every November by the World Wrestling Federation (WWF, renamed WWE in 2002) since 1987, held around Thanksgiving in the United States. In what has become the second longest running PPV event in history (behind WWE's WrestleMania), it is one of the promotion's original four PPVs, along with WrestleMania, Royal Rumble, and SummerSlam, referred to as the "Big Four". The event is traditionally characterized by having Survivor Series matches, which are tag team elimination matches that typically pits teams of four or five wrestlers against each other. This was the first event in which the card was not dominated by Survivor Series matches; only one such match was scheduled to occur at the 1992 event. Like the prior year, the sixth Survivor Series event was scheduled to be held on Thanksgiving Eve on Wednesday, November 25, 1992, returning the event to the Richfield Coliseum in Richfield Township, Ohio. It was the third Survivor Series at the venue, after the 1987 and 1988 events.

=== Storylines ===
In the storyline behind the match between The Big Boss Man and Nailz, Nailz claimed that while he was serving time in prison, the Big Boss Man, who was a guard at the prison, mistreated Nailz. In early 1992, Nailz appeared in introductory vignettes to talk about his hatred of the Big Boss Man. Upon his debut in the WWF, Nailz attacked Bossman and stole his nightstick, which he used to attack his opponents over the following months.

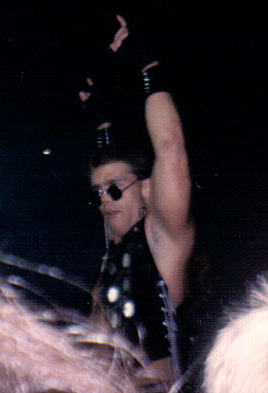
Shawn Michaels challenged Bret Hart for the WWF World Heavyweight Championship at Survivor Series.

Shortly after Tatanka's debut in the WWF, he became involved in a feud with Rick Martel. They faced each other at WrestleMania VIII, and Tatanka defeated Martel. The following month, Martel gained revenge by attacking Tatanka with an atomizer of cologne and stealing the eagle feathers that Tatanka carried to symbolize his Lumbee heritage.

Ric Flair and his "executive consultant" Mr. Perfect had been allies in the WWF for much of 1992. After Flair lost the WWF World Heavyweight Championship to Macho Man Randy Savage at WrestleMania VIII, Flair and Perfect continued their feud with Savage. They interfered in Savage's match at SummerSlam and caused him to lose by countout. The rivalry continued, and Flair received assistance from Perfect and Razor Ramon to win the title back from Savage on September 1, which aired on the September 14 edition of WWF Prime Time Wrestling. The WWF planned for Savage to team with Ultimate Warrior in a match against Flair and Ramon at Survivor Series, but Bobby Heenan announced at the end of Saturday Night's Main Event XXXI that he had been informed either Savage or Warrior was going to have a new tag team partner. Ultimate Warrior left the WWF before the match could take place. Two possible reasons have been given for his departure. The first states that he was fired due to allegations of steroid abuse, while the other states that he was upset with the WWF's future plans for his character. The WWF was forced to change the plan and decided to turn Perfect into a babyface (fan favorite) from a heel. To help facilitate the face turn, Perfect and Flair began having conflicts while teaming together, and eventually Perfect accepted Savage's offer on the November 16 episode of WWF Prime Time Wrestling to team with him at Survivor Series.

Money Inc. ("Million Dollar Man" Ted DiBiase and Irwin R. Schyster) had been feuding with The Natural Disasters (Earthquake and Typhoon) since February 1992 when manager Jimmy Hart turned on Earthquake and Typhoon in favor of helping Money, Inc. With Hart's assistance, Money, Inc. defeated the Legion of Doom for the WWF Tag Team Championship on February 7, 1992. Five months later, Earthquake and Typhoon defeated Money Inc. to win the championship. The Natural Disasters were also feuding with The Beverly Brothers (Beau Beverly and Blake Beverly) and defeated them in a title match at SummerSlam 1992. A match was then announced for Survivor Series in which The Natural Disasters would team with The Bushwhackers (Bushwhacker Luke and Bushwhacker Butch) to face Money, Inc. and the Beverly Brothers. However, when The Nasty Boys (Brian Knobbs and Jerry Sags), also managed by Hart, were scheduled to face The Natural Disasters for the title on October 13, Hart replaced The Nasty Boys at the last minute with Money, Inc., who went on to regain the championship with help from The Headshrinkers. This led to a break-up between Hart and the Nasty Boys, who received the Bushwhackers' spot in the Survivor Series match to get revenge against Jimmy Hart and Money, Inc.

At SummerSlam 1992 in August, The Undertaker defeated Kamala. Harvey Wippleman, Kamala's manager wanted revenge, so a rematch was scheduled for Survivor Series. The match was promoted as the WWF's first coffin match, in which the winner would place the loser in a coffin after the match.

The WWF also planned a match featuring The British Bulldog defending the WWF Intercontinental Championship against The Mountie at Survivor Series. The WWF released Smith due to steroid allegations, however, and he was made to drop the title belt to Shawn Michaels on the November 14 episode of Saturday Night's Main Event XXXI. Ultimately, the WWF neglected to include an Intercontinental Championship match on the card as Michaels was already scheduled to challenge Bret Hart for the WWF Championship at Survivor Series. In this match, Hart's title was defended while Michaels' title was not.

== Event ==
Other on-screen personnel
Role:	Name:
Commentator	Vince McMahon
Commentator	Bobby Heenan
Interviewers	Gene Okerlund
Interviewers	Sean Mooney
Interviewers	Lord Alfred Hayes
Ring announcer	Howard Finkel
Referee	Mike Chioda
Referee	Danny Davis
Referee	Earl Hebner
Referee	Joey Marella

Prior to the pay-per-view broadcast, Crush defeated the Repo Man via submission.

In the first televised match, High Energy (Owen Hart and Koko B. Ware) faced The Headshrinkers (Samu and Fatu). Samu used his strength advantage to control the opening of the match against Hart. Ware entered the match and gained the advantage over both opponents until he attempted to knock The Headshrinkers' heads against each other. According to WWF storylines, Samoans like The Headshrinkers have thick skulls and cannot be hurt in the head; as a result, The Headshrinkers no-sold the attack. Afa, The Headshrinkers' manager, attacked Ware while the referee was distracted. Samu and Fatu took turns attacking Ware, and Fatu performed a thrust kick on Ware. The Headshrinkers used rulebreaking tactics to control the match until Hart was able to enter the match. He performed dropkicks from the top rope against both Headshrinkers. As he tried to attack Samu from the top rope again, Samu caught him and powerslammed him before Fatu executed a diving splash to get the pinfall victory.

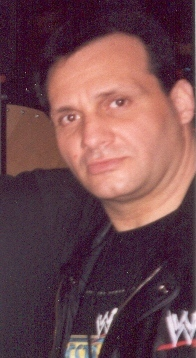
Steve Lombardi appeared as Kim Chee, Kamala's handler.

The next match, between The Big Boss Man and Nailz, was a nightstick on a pole match. A nightstick was suspended above the ring and could be used as a weapon once it was retrieved. Nailz began the match by attempting to get the nightstick, but Boss Man stopped him. Nailz choked Boss Man before making another unsuccessful attempt to climb the pole and obtain the nightstick. Boss Man punched Nailz and then tried to climb the pole. Nailz stopped him, performed a back body drop, and choked Boss Man again. Boss Man regained control but missed a splash, which gave Nailz another chance to retrieve the nightstick. Both men clotheslined each other, but Boss Man recovered first and got the nightstick. He hit Nailz with it, but Nailz took it and used it against Boss Man. Boss Man performed the Boss Man slam, his finishing move, before pinning Nailz to win the match.

Tatanka controlled the opening of the next match against "The Model" Rick Martel with several throws and dropkicks. Martel responded by wearing Tatanka down with a front facelock. Tatanka escaped, but Martel used another front facelock almost immediately. He performed a neckbreaker on Tatanka before going back to the same hold as before. Tatanka gained the advantage by performing a clothesline on Martel. Martel ran at Tatanka, but Tatanka moved out of the way and Martel hit his shoulder against the ring post. Tatanka focused on attacking Martel's injured shoulder but eventually was thrown out of the ring by Martel. Martel's advantage was short-lived, as Tatanka performed a series of backhand chops and a Tomahawk chop from the top rope before nailing The Model with a Samoan drop. Tatanka got the pinfall victory and retrieved his feathers from Martel after the match. While the match was in progress, a clown stood in the aisle and made balloon animals before popping them to upset the children in the audience.

In the next contest, promoted beforehand as the main event of the evening, Ric Flair and Razor Ramon wrestled against Mr. Perfect and Randy Savage. Ramon and Perfect began the match, but Flair entered after Perfect insulted him. Perfect threw Flair into the corner, and Flair's momentum carried him over the top rope to the ring apron. Savage attacked Flair and then took Perfect's place in the ring to maintain the advantage over Flair. From outside the ring, Ramon hit Savage with his knee and Flair and Ramon took turns attacking Savage's knee. While Ramon performed a half Boston crab on Savage, Perfect considered leaving the match and abandoning Savage. Savage recovered briefly by trying to pin Flair, but Ramon performed a chokeslam on Savage. Ric Flair attempted to attack Savage from the top rope, but Savage threw him to the ring floor instead. Perfect executed a neckbreaker and an atomic drop on Ramon. Outside of the ring, Flair attacked Savage with a chair. The referee was knocked unconscious, and Perfect tried to pin Ramon by performing a PerfectPlex. Because no referee was available to count the pinfall, a substitute referee came to the ring. The first referee recovered as Perfect attempted to pin Flair with a PerfectPlex. Flair escaped the pin attempt, and he and Ramon attacked Perfect until the referees were unable to keep the match under control. As a result, Ramon and Flair were disqualified, and the victory was awarded to Perfect and Savage.

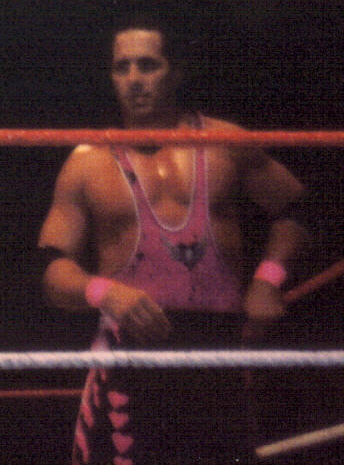
Bret Hart defeated Shawn Michaels to retain the WWF World Heavyweight Championship.

In the next match, Virgil faced Yokozuna, who was billed at 505 pounds and making his pay-per-view debut. Virgil was unable to knock Yokozuna down with several dropkicks. Yokozuna performed a savate kick on Virgil before throwing him to the ring floor twice. He executed a legdrop on Virgil, but Virgil regained the advantage when Yokozuna accidentally ran into the ring pole while trying to attack Virgil. Yokozuna won the match after a splash in the corner and a Banzai Drop.

The following match was the only Survivor Series elimination match of the pay-per-view, in which The Natural Disasters (Earthquake and Typhoon) teamed with the Nasty Boys (Jerry Sags and Brian Knobbs) to face Money Inc. (Ted DiBiase and Irwin R. Schyster) and the Beverly Brothers (Beau Beverly and Blake Beverly). The rules stated that when any man was eliminated, his tag team partner would also be eliminated. Blake Beverly and Typhoon began the match, but Beau and Earthquake soon entered the ring as well. The Natural Disasters gained control of the match by attacking Blake Beverly, and the Nasty Boys entered the ring to assist the Disasters. Blake attacked Sags and tagged out of the match. Beau entered but was bodyslammed by Sags; Sags got distracted, however, which allowed Beau to suplex him and bring DiBiase into the match. Money Inc. took turns attacking Sags until Earthquake entered the ring. Earthquake performed an Earthquake splash by sitting on Beau Beverly to pin him and eliminate both Beverly Brothers. Earthquake fought DiBiase, but both men eventually left the ring and were replaced by their partners. Typhoon performed a splash on Schyster but was tripped by DiBiase. Schyster pinned Typhoon to eliminate The Natural Disasters. While Schyster was celebrating, Sags quickly pinned him to win the match for the Nasty Boys.

The coffin match, in which The Undertaker faced Kamala, came next. Kamala began the match by running in fear from The Undertaker. He gained the early advantage, however, by suddenly turning around and attacking The Undertaker. Kamala bodyslammed The Undertaker three times and performed three splashes. In an attempt to revive The Undertaker, Paul Bearer, his manager, held up an urn that was said to be the source of The Undertaker's power. Kim Chee, one of Kamala's handler's attacked Bearer. The Undertaker picked up the urn, which had rolled into the ring, and hit Kamala with it. The Undertaker pinned Kamala to win the match, placed him in a coffin, and nailed the lid shut.

In the last match of the card, Bret Hart defended his WWF World Heavyweight Championship against Shawn Michaels. Hart controlled the beginning of the match by repeatedly executing armdrags and armbars but Michaels gained the advantage when "The Hitman" missed a charge into the corner and collided shoulder-first with the ring post. Michaels then threw Hart into another ring post and wore him down by executing a front facelock. Hart was able to avoid Michaels' first attempt at his finisher, the modified back suplex, and rallied with his trademark moves including an elbow from the second rope, running bulldog and a superplex. Michaels recovered and performed a superkick on Hart and was able this time to apply his suplex, but Hart kicked out. After Hart missed a desperation crossbody and crotched himself on the ropes, Shawn attempted a dropkick from the middle rope but Hart grabbed Michaels' legs and applied the Sharpshooter, his finishing move. He retained his championship by forcing Michaels to submit.

== Reception ==
Survivor Series 1992 was attended by 17,500 fans, the same number as the previous year. It drew more fans than any of the following three Survivor Series event would draw. The pay-per-view buyrate was 1.4, which means that 1.4 percent of households to which the event was available purchased the pay-per-view. This was, to that point, the lowest buyrate in Survivor Series history and down more than one-third from the previous year's 2.2 buyrate. The buyrate was higher than that of any of the following twelve Survivor Series events, however.

Dave Meltzer awarded the Hart-Michaels match 4.5 stars out of five, while giving the Flair/Ramon vs. Savage/Perfect tag team match 3.25 stars. The remaining matches received 2.25 stars or lower, with Kamala vs. The Undertaker being an unrated "dud". Writing for The History of WWE, Matt Pettycord stated that the event was "pretty decent" considering that The Mountie, Davey Boy Smith, and Ultimate Warrior left the company shortly before the event. On a five-star scale, he rated only the aforementioned tag team match and Hart vs. Michaels higher than one star. He stated that the event is "recommended, but not required", although the WWF World Heavyweight Championship match was a "must-see".

Adam Gutschmidt, reviewing the event for Online Onslaught, gave a rating of one-quarter star for the Nightstick on a Pole match and one-half star each for the High Energy vs. The Headshrinkers match and the Yokozuna vs. Virgil match. He enjoyed the WWF World Heavyweight Championship match, although he was disappointed by its lack of buildup prior to the event. He also felt that the Flair/Ramon vs. Savage/Perfect match was a good one until the ending got out of control. Brian Hoops of Pro Wrestling Torch agreed, stating that the WWF World Heavyweight Championship match was the highlight and that the Flair/Ramon vs. Savage/Perfect bout was also enjoyable: he recommended fast-forwarding through the rest of the show.

== Aftermath ==
Ric Flair and Mr. Perfect continued their feud, although Flair legitimately requested to be released from his WWF contract in order to return to World Championship Wrestling (WCW). His request was granted on the condition that he help build up Perfect as a credible babyface. The two men attacked each other during the battle royal at Royal Rumble 1993, and Perfect eliminated Flair from the match. The following night, Perfect defeated Flair in a loser leaves town match. Flair did not return to the WWF until McMahon purchased WCW in 2001.

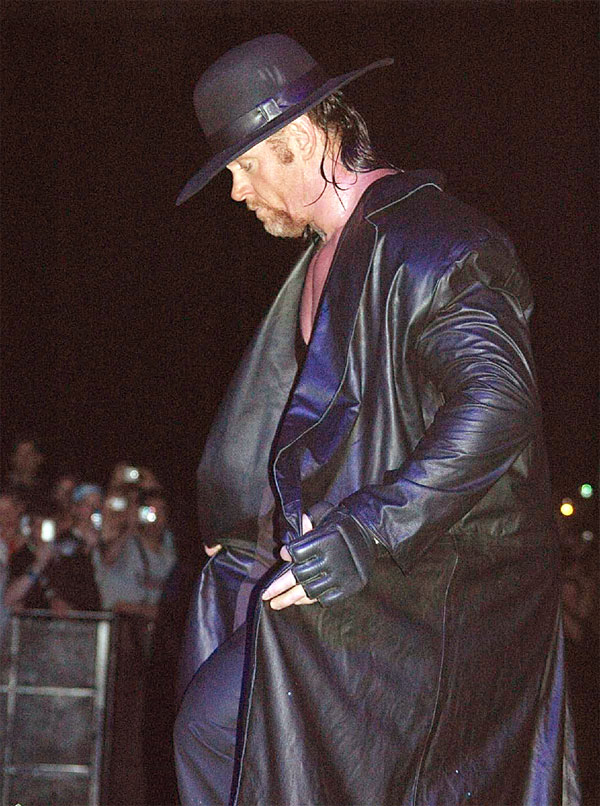
The Undertaker was victorious in both of his pay-per-view matches against Giant Gonzalez.

The Undertaker's feud with Harvey Wippleman continued for several months after Survivor Series. At Royal Rumble 1993, Wippleman introduced a new wrestler named Giant Gonzalez. Despite not being scheduled in the match, Gonzalez attacked The Undertaker and eliminated him from the Royal Rumble match. The two men faced each other at WrestleMania IX, where Gonzalez was disqualified for attacking The Undertaker with a rag soaked in chloroform. Wippleman led Gonzalez and Mr. Hughes in another attack on The Undertaker, in which Hughes stole The Undertaker's urn. The feud was resolved at SummerSlam 1993, when The Undertaker defeated Gonzalez in a Rest in Peace match.

Yokozuna's push continued, and he won the battle royal main event at Royal Rumble 1993 to earn a WWF World Heavyweight Championship match against Bret Hart at WrestleMania IX. At WrestleMania, he defeated Hart to win the title belt. He immediately challenged Hulk Hogan to a match however, and WrestleMania ended with Yokozuna losing the WWF World Heavyweight Championship to Hogan in 21 seconds.

Kevin Wacholz, who had portrayed Nailz, left the WWF shortly after Survivor Series. Upset about his pay from SummerSlam 1992, he confronted WWF owner Vince McMahon and reportedly attacked him physically. He later testified against McMahon during a trial in which McMahon was accused of distributing steroids to wrestlers. Wacholz' statements have been reported as having a harmful effect on the prosecution's case because his anger at McMahon overshadowed his testimony.

Shawn Michaels became involved in a feud with his former tag team partner, Marty Jannetty. The team had split up earlier in the year when Michaels attacked Jannetty. Michaels defeated Jannetty at Royal Rumble 1993, but the two traded the Intercontinental Championship back and forth in subsequent rematches.

Hart and Michaels would again main-event Survivor Series five years later for the WWF World Heavyweight Championship with Hart defending; however, Michaels would win the title in controversial fashion.

== Home media and streaming ==
The event was released in North America on VHS by Coliseum Video on February 11, 1993. The VHS version was released in the United Kingdom by Silver Vision in February 1993. The home video version includes previously unbroadcast interviews with Bret Hart and Yokozuna.

A DVD version was previously also available in the United Kingdom; it was packaged together with Survivor Series 1991 as part of the WWE Tagged Classics line and released on November 7, 2005.

In 2014, the event was included on the WWE's streaming platform the WWE Network as part of its launch and remained on the service until the platform closed. As of October 2026, subscribers in multiple territories, including the US, Canada and the UK, can stream the event on Netflix, thanks to the WWE's ten-year agreement with the company.

== Results ==
No.	Results	Stipulations	Times
1^{D}	Crush defeated Repo Man by submission	Singles match	—
2	The Headshrinkers (Samu and Fatu) (with Afa) defeated High Energy (Owen Hart and Koko B. Ware) by pinfall	Tag team match	7:40
3	Big Boss Man defeated Nailz by pinfall	Nightstick on a Pole match	5:44
4	Tatanka defeated Rick Martel by pinfall	Singles match	11:07
5	Randy Savage and Mr. Perfect defeated Ric Flair and Razor Ramon by disqualification	Tag team match	16:38
6	Yokozuna (with Mr. Fuji) defeated Virgil by pinfall	Singles match	3:34
7	The Natural Disasters (Earthquake and Typhoon) and The Nasty Boys (Jerry Sags and Brian Knobbs) defeated Money Inc. (Ted DiBiase and Irwin R. Schyster) and The Beverly Brothers (Beau and Blake) (with The Genius and Jimmy Hart)	4-on-4 Survivor Series match^{Eliminations}	15:50
8	The Undertaker (with Paul Bearer) defeated Kamala (with Harvey Wippleman and Kim Chee) by putting Kamala in the coffin with the lid completely shut	Coffin match	5:27
9	Bret Hart (c) defeated Shawn Michaels by submission	Singles match for the WWF Championship	26:40
(c) / – the champion(s) heading into the match; D / – this was a dark match

=== Survivor Series match ===
^1

Eliminated	Wrestler	Eliminated by	Method	Time
1	Beau Beverly	Earthquake	Pinfall	9:25
2	Typhoon	Irwin R. Schyster	Pinfall	15:45
3	Irwin R. Schyster	Jerry Sags	Pinfall	15:50
Survivors:	The Nasty Boys (Brian Knobbs and Jerry Sags)			
