= Royal Rumble (1993) =

World Wrestling Federation pay-per-view event

- Promotional poster featuring Bret Hart and Razor Ramon among various WWF wrestlers
- Promotion: World Wrestling Federation
- Date: January 24, 1993
- City: Sacramento, California
- Venue: ARCO Arena
- Attendance: 16,000

Pay-per-view chronology
← Previous; Survivor Series	Next → WrestleMania IX

Royal Rumble chronology
← Previous; 1992	Next → 1994

The 1993 Royal Rumble was a professional wrestling pay-per-view (PPV) event produced by the World Wrestling Federation (WWF, renamed WWE in 2002). It was the sixth annual Royal Rumble event and took place on January 24, 1993, at the ARCO Arena in Sacramento, California. It centered on the men's Royal Rumble match, a modified 30-man battle royal in which the participants enter at timed intervals instead of all beginning in the ring at the same time.

Six matches were contested at the event, including one dark match. The main event was the 1993 Royal Rumble match. It was won by Yokozuna, who was awarded a match for the WWF Championship at WrestleMania IX. This was the first time that the Rumble winner earned a world championship match at WrestleMania, which is now standard for the annual event. In other prominent matches, Bret Hart defeated Razor Ramon to retain the WWF Championship, and Shawn Michaels defeated Marty Jannetty to retain the WWF Intercontinental Championship. The event marked the WWF debut of former World Bodybuilding Federation bodybuilder Lex Luger.

== Production ==
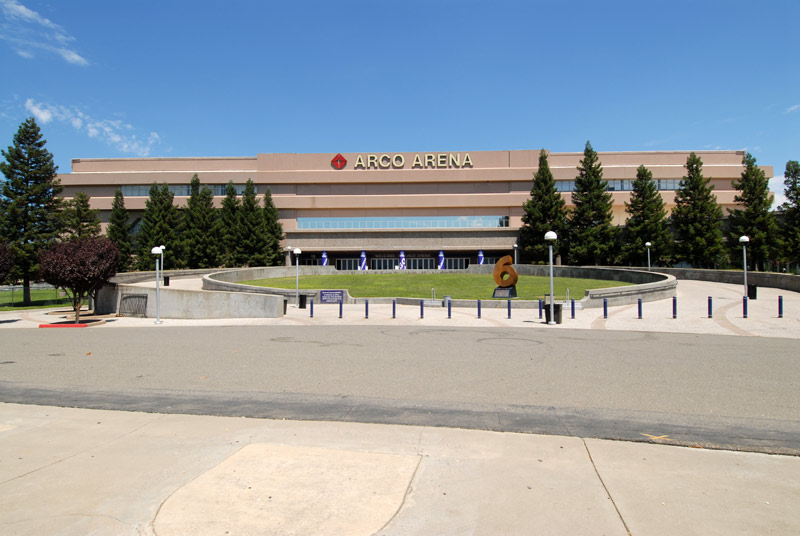
The sixth annual Royal Rumble event was held at the ARCO Arena in Sacramento, California.

=== Background ===
The Royal Rumble is an annual professional wrestling event, produced every January by the World Wrestling Federation (WWF, renamed WWE in 2002) since 1988; that first event was a television special before it became an annual pay-per-view (PPV) beginning in 1989. It is one of the promotion's original four PPVs, along with WrestleMania, SummerSlam, and Survivor Series, referred to as the "Big Four". It is named after and centered on the men's Royal Rumble match. The sixth Royal Rumble event was scheduled to be held on January 24, 1993, at the ARCO Arena in Sacramento, California.

The Royal Rumble match is a modified battle royal in which the participants enter at timed intervals instead of all beginning in the ring at the same time, and the match generally features 30 wrestlers. Not including the non-televised test match in 1987, prior to 1992, there was no prize for winning the match. At the 1992 event, as the WWF Championship had been vacated prior to the event, it was decided that the prize for the 1992 Royal Rumble match would be the vacant title. For the 1993 match, it was decided that the winner would receive a match for the championship at WrestleMania IX.

=== Storylines ===
The event included matches that resulted from scripted storylines. Results were predetermined by writers of the WWF, while storylines were produced on WWF's weekly live television and syndicated shows, Prime Time Wrestling, which was then replaced by the new Monday Night Raw from January 11, 1993, as well as Superstars of Wrestling and Mania.

The primary feud leading up to Royal Rumble 1993 was between WWFChampion Bret Hart and challenger Razor Ramon (a replacement for The Ultimate Warrior, who had left the previous November). Ramon formed an alliance in late 1992 with Ric Flair, who Hart defeated to win the title belt. During an interview in which Hart was talking about the upcoming match, Ramon and Flair came to the ring and attacked Hart. Ramon later escalated the feud by attacking Owen Hart, Bret's brother.

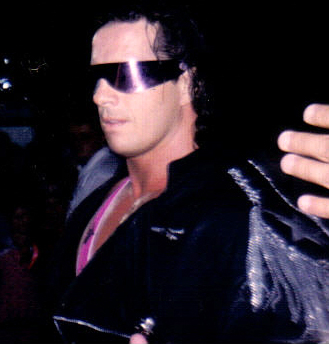
Bret Hart was the WWF Champion going into the event.

Another major feud featured at the event was between Shawn Michaels and Marty Jannetty, who had teamed for several years as The Rockers. The team split up in December 1991, when Michaels attacked Jannetty during an episode of Brutus Beefcake's interview segment, "The Barber Shop". Michaels became a singles wrestler and won the WWF Intercontinental Championship on October 27, 1992, from Davey Boy Smith. On the October 31, 1992, episode of Superstars of Wrestling, Jannetty returned to the WWF after a lengthy absence and confronted Michaels. He attempted to hit Michaels with a mirror, but Michaels pulled his valet, Sensational Sherri in front of him. Sherri was hit with the mirror, which caused friction between her and Michaels. Michaels and Jannetty were scheduled to face each other for the Intercontinental Championship at Royal Rumble 1993. Leading up to the match, Sherri announced that she would be in the corner of one of the men, but she refused to say which one.

In an undercard match, The Steiner Brothers (Rick Steiner and Scott Steiner), who made their WWF debut in late 1992, were scheduled to face the Beverly Brothers (Beau Beverly and Blake Beverly). There was little buildup for the match, but the Steiners and Beverlys had a rivalry over which was the best team of brothers in the WWF (although the Beverly Brothers are not related in real life).

Several feuds also formed the background for the Royal Rumble match. Virgil had served as Ted DiBiase's servant and bodyguard for several years. DiBiase treated Virgil poorly, which eventually led Virgil to turn against his employer. At Royal Rumble 1991, he attacked DiBiase after a match by hitting him with the Million Dollar Championship, a title that DiBiase had awarded himself. Virgil defeated DiBiase for the belt at SummerSlam 1991, although DiBiase later regained the title. The Undertaker was feuding with manager Harvey Wippleman. He had a series of matches against Kamala in 1992 that included a bout at SummerSlam. The rivalry culminated in a coffin match at Survivor Series 1992. The Undertaker won the match, but Wippleman vowed revenge. Tito Santana and Rick Martel had formed a tag team known as Strike Force in 1987, and they held the World Tag Team Championship together for five months. Martel walked away during a match against the Brain Busters at WrestleMania V, leaving Santana to face both opponents alone. The team split up as a result and the former partners had a lengthy feud.

Mr. Perfect served as "executive consultant" to Ric Flair in 1992, but the relationship broke down toward the end of the year. The partnership split up when Perfect teamed with Randy Savage to face Flair and Razor Ramon at Survivor Series 1992. Flair legitimately requested a release from his contract, as he felt he would be more successful if he returned to World Championship Wrestling (WCW). WWF owner Vince McMahon agreed and set up a feud between Flair and Perfect to create a storyline for Flair's departure from the company. Many wrestlers were scheduled to compete at the 1993 Royal Rumble but were either replaced or had left the company before the event. Those who were scheduled to compete were Doink the Clown, Crush, Hacksaw Jim Duggan, The Mountie, and Kamala.

The event also featured the WWF debut of Lex Luger. Luger had previously wrestled in WCW, where he held the WCW World Heavyweight Championship. He had left the wrestling industry to join Vince McMahon's World Bodybuilding Federation (WBF). After the WBF failed, Luger signed with McMahon's WWF.

== Event ==
Other on-screen personnel
Role:	Name:
Commentator	Gorilla Monsoon
Commentator	Bobby Heenan
Interviewers	Gene Okerlund
Interviewers	Raymond Rougeau
Ring announcer	Howard Finkel
Referee	John Bonello
Referee	Danny Davis
Referee	Jack Doan
Referee	Earl Hebner
Referee	Joey Marella
Referee	Bill Alfonso

=== Preliminary matches ===
Five matches with pre-determined results were shown on the pay-per-view telecast. In addition, Doink the Clown defeated Jim Powers by submission in an untelevised dark match before the event. In the first match shown as part of the broadcast, the Steiner Brothers (Rick Steiner and Scott Steiner) faced the Beverly Brothers (Beau Beverly and Blake Beverly). Scott gained the early advantage over Beau, and both men quickly tagged in their partners. Rick performed a body slam on Blake, and then tagged Scott back in, who threw Blake with a belly to belly suplex. The Beverly Brothers regained the advantage and took turns attacking Scott's back. Blake performed a Boston crab hold to put more pressure on Scott's back and attempt to force him to submit. Scott escaped the hold and threw Blake to the mat by performing a Tiger driver. The Steiners capitalized on their advantage by keeping Blake in the ring and unable to tag his partner. Scott won the match for his team by pinning Blake after executing a Frankensteiner.

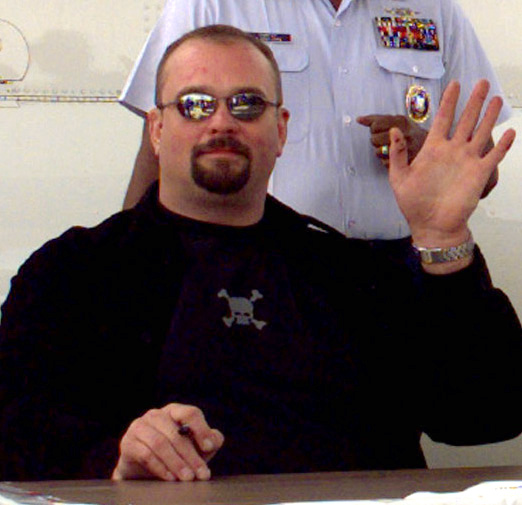
The Big Boss Man faced Bam Bam Bigelow.

In the next match, Sensational Sherri stood at ringside as Shawn Michaels defended his Intercontinental Championship against Marty Jannetty. She did not reveal her allegiance to either man. Jannetty gained the early advantage, knocking Michaels out of the ring and diving into him through the ropes. He then attacked Michaels by jumping off the top rope, but Michaels countered this move by hitting him on the way down. Michaels hit Jannetty's shoulder against the ring post and focused on wearing down the shoulder once both men had re-entered the ring. Michaels missed an attack from the top rope, which allowed Jannetty to punch him repeatedly. Michaels recovered and threw Jannetty out of the ring, but Jannetty then suplexed Michaels over the rope and onto the arena floor. Sherri turned on Michaels by slapping him in the face, and Jannetty threw Michaels back into the ring with a belly-to-back suplex. Jannetty performed a power slam and a DDT on Michaels. Michaels attempted to punch Jannetty but knocked the referee unconscious instead. Sherri came into the ring and tried to hit Michaels with her shoe. Michaels moved out of the way, and Sherri hit Jannetty instead. When the referee recovered, Michaels performed a superkick on Jannetty and pinned him to retain the championship.

The third televised match featured the Big Boss Man facing Bam Bam Bigelow. Bigelow attacked Boss Man before the match and controlled the match's beginning by using power moves to wear Boss Man down. Boss Man performed two clotheslines on Bigelow to gain the advantage. Bigelow responded by throwing Boss Man with a belly-to-back suplex, and then threw him out of the ring. He wore Boss Man down with a bear hug. Boss Man briefly regained the advantage by suplexing Bigelow but eventually tried to run at Bigelow to crush him in the corner of the ring. As Boss Man approached, Bigelow kicked him in the face and followed this up by performing a diving headbutt from the top rope to win the match by pinfall.

The next match was for the WWF World Heavyweight Championship, as Bret Hart defended the title against Razor Ramon. Ramon got the early advantage by punching Hart repeatedly but accidentally hit his knee against a turnbuckle while running at Hart. Hart applied a figure-four leglock to apply pressure to Ramon's knee. Ramon escaped the hold and threw Hart against a ring post; he capitalized on this advantage by attacking Hart's back. Ramon threw Hart with a fallaway slam and applied a bear hug. Hart escaped the hold by biting Ramon. He threw Ramon out of the ring and performed several of his signature moves, including a Russian legsweep and an elbow drop from the second rope. Hart applied the Sharpshooter, his signature hold, but Ramon grabbed the ropes, which forced the referee to instruct Hart to break the hold. Hart threw Ramon with a belly-to-back suplex, but Ramon responded by attempting to perform the Razor's Edge, his signature move. Hart reversed this into an unsuccessful pin attempt. With both men exhausted, Hart applied the Sharpshooter and won the match by forcing Ramon to submit.

Before the final match, Bobby Heenan, a manager and commentator, unveiled his newest wrestler, "The Narcissist" Lex Luger. Heenan pointed out Luger's muscles and announced that Luger would carry on Heenan's rivalry with Mr. Perfect.

=== Main event ===
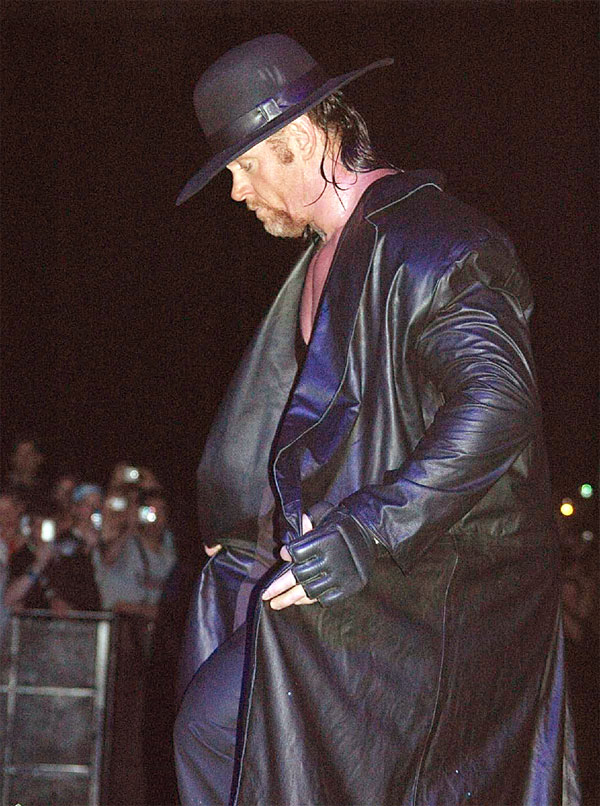
The Undertaker was eliminated from the Royal Rumble by Giant González.

The main event of the broadcast, the Royal Rumble match, came next. For the first time, a stipulation was added that the winner of the match would receive a match for the WWF Championship at that year's WrestleMania (a provision that has remained since). The match began with two former WWF Champions, as Ric Flair and Bob Backlund entered the ring first. Every two minutes, one of the remaining twenty-eight contestants entered the match according to the number they drew before the event. Papa Shango was the third wrestler to enter but was thrown over the top rope and onto the arena floor by Ric Flair, causing Shango to be eliminated. Virgil entered sixth and immediately attacked Ted DiBiase because of their long-standing grudge. When Mr. Perfect entered the number ten spot, he and Flair fought each other until Perfect eliminated Flair by performing a clothesline to knock Flair onto the floor. Virgil was eliminated by The Berzerker, while Perfect was thrown out of the ring by Jerry Lawler, Koko B. Ware, and Ted DiBiase.

The Undertaker was the fifteenth wrestler to enter; he eliminated four men before Harvey Wippleman appeared, accompanying a large man (who was later revealed to be Giant González, billed at eight feet tall). González attacked The Undertaker and threw him out of the ring; as a result, The Undertaker was eliminated from the match. Several referees tried to get González to return to the locker room; he eventually left, and Paul Bearer, The Undertaker's manager, came to the ring. He helped The Undertaker revive, and The Undertaker returned to the locker room to find González. Several minutes later, Typhoon entered the match, followed shortly by his tag team partner in The Natural Disasters, Earthquake. Earthquake immediately targeted Typhoon and eliminated him from the match. Earthquake tried to console his partner, who ignored him and left ringside. Later, Tito Santana and Rick Martel were in the ring at the same time; they fought each other immediately as a result of their five-year-old feud. Yokozuna, weighing over 500 pounds (227 kilograms), entered in the number twenty-seven spot; at one point, almost every wrestler worked together in an attempt to eliminate him, but they were unable to lift him.

Former WWF Champion Randy Savage was the last wrestler to enter the match. The wrestlers fought and several men were eliminated in quick succession, leaving Backlund, Martel, Yokozuna, and Savage. Backlund eliminated Martel but was then eliminated by Yokozuna. Backlund was in the ring for one hour, one minute, and ten seconds, which set a new record for time spent in a Royal Rumble match. Savage gained the advantage over Yokozuna; he knocked him down and performed a diving elbow drop from the top rope. He tried to pin Yokozuna, although pinfalls are not counted during a Royal Rumble. Yokozuna pushed Savage off of him so hard that Savage flew over the top rope and onto the arena floor. As a result, Yokozuna was named the winner of the 1993 Royal Rumble match.

== Reception ==
Writing for Online Onslaught, columnist Adam Gutschmidt stated that the first half of the event is worth watching. He enjoyed the tag team match and the bout between Jannetty and Michaels. He also found the WWF World Heavyweight Championship match surprisingly good. He did not feel that the match between Big Boss Man and Bam Bam Bigelow was interesting. He also disliked the Royal Rumble match because too many tag team wrestlers were included, there were few exciting moments, and Giant González did not help the match. Scott Keith reviewed the event for 411mania. He found the opening match between the Steiners and Beverlys to be boring. He enjoyed much of the match between Jannetty and Michaels but found the ending disappointing. He rated the match between Boss Man and Bigelow as a "dud" but enjoyed the WWF World Heavyweight Championship bout. He called the Royal Rumble match one of the worst in history, as he found much of the match boring and did not enjoy the debut of González. Overall, he rated the event as "mildly recommended". Reviewing the event for the Wrestling Observer Newsletter, Dave Meltzer gave the tag-team match a score of three stars, the Intercontinental Championship match four stars, and the WWF World Heavyweight Title match three and one-quarter stars.

The event drew 16,000 spectators, who paid $187,000 in admission fees. This was down from the previous year's 17,000 fans but higher than the attendance for any of the following three Royal Rumble events. The pay-per-view buyrate of 1.25 was also lower than that of Royal Rumble 1992, which had a 1.8 buyrate. It was higher than the buy rates for all of the Royal Rumble events from 1994 to 1998.

== Aftermath ==
At WrestleMania IX, Yokozuna defeated Bret Hart to win the WWF World Heavyweight Championship. His title reign only lasted several minutes, as he dropped the belt to Hulk Hogan in an impromptu match. Yokozuna regained the title but dropped it to Hart the following year. The 1993 Royal Rumble in turn began a tradition, in which the winner of the titular match now earns a world championship match at WrestleMania.

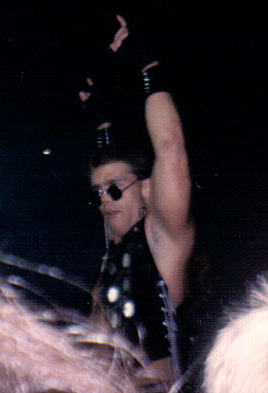
Shawn Michaels continued his feud with Marty Jannetty.

Shawn Michaels continued his feud with Sensational Sherri at WrestleMania IX. Sherri accompanied Tatanka, and Michaels countered this by introducing Luna Vachon, his new valet. After the match, Vachon attacked Sherri. The feud also continued between Michaels and Jannetty, as Jannetty defeated Michaels for the Intercontinental Championship on May 17, 1993. Michaels regained the belt in a rematch the following month to end the feud.

Razor Ramon continued to wrestle in high-profile matches but achieved little success until changing his persona to a face after losing to the underdog 1-2-3 Kid in May 1993. As a fan favorite, Ramon won his first of four Intercontinental Championships in September 1993.

The day after Royal Rumble on Monday Night Raw, Flair faced Perfect in a loser leaves town match, in which the loser would be forced to leave the WWF forever. Because Flair had an agreement with McMahon to lose to Mr. Perfect before leaving the promotion, Perfect won the match and Flair did not appear in the WWF again until 2001 on the episode of Raw that was the day after Survivor Series when he appeared as a co-owner of the promotion. With Flair gone from the promotion, Luger continued Heenan's feud and defeated Mr. Perfect at WrestleMania IX.

The Beverly Brothers were unable to win the World Tag Team Championship, but the Steiners won the belts on two occasions in 1993. They feuded with Money Inc. (DiBiase and Irwin R. Schyster), who had held the belts since the previous October, before winning their first championship on June 14.

Earthquake and Typhoon stopped teaming after their confrontation during the Royal Rumble match. No feud ever materialized, as Earthquake was released by the WWF and left to compete in Japan. The rivalry between Virgil and DiBiase was not mentioned again until the following year, when Virgil had a brief feud with Nikolai Volkoff, who was managed by DiBiase. DiBiase was reunited with Virgil, who had been renamed Vincent, when both men were members of WCW's New World Order in 1996.

Luger's status as a heel (villain) was short-lived. Yokozuna issued a challenge for any American athlete to try to bodyslam him on the deck of the USS Intrepid on Independence Day that year. Several athletes made the attempt, but nobody was able to lift Yokozuna until Luger arrived in a helicopter and bodyslammed Yokozuna. Luger received a push and was given a match for Yokozuna's WWF World Heavyweight Championship at SummerSlam 1993, but he was unable to win the belt.

The Undertaker's feud with Harvey Wippleman escalated in the following months and was featured at two more pay-per-view events in 1993. The Undertaker faced Giant González at WrestleMania IX; González was disqualified after attacking The Undertaker with a chloroform-soaked rag provided by Wippleman. Wippleman and González recruited Mr. Hughes, and the three men attacked The Undertaker and Paul Bearer. They stole The Undertaker's urn, which was said to be the source of his power. The feud culminated in a Rest in Peace match at SummerSlam 1993, which The Undertaker won to end the feud.

== Home media and streaming ==
Royal Rumble 1993 was released on VHS by Coliseum Video on February 11, 1993, in North America. In the United Kingdom, it was released on VHS in April 1993 by Silver Vision. The video includes a previously unaired interview with the Steiner Brothers.

On June 6, 2005, it was packaged together with Royal Rumble 1994 as part of WWE's Tagged Classics line for its United Kingdom DVD release. This was followed by the Complete Royal Rumble Anthology DVD set, which was released in the USA and the UK in autumn 2007.

In 2014, the event was included on the WWE's streaming platform the WWE Network as part of its launch and remained on the service until the platform closed. In January 2025, WWE uploaded the Royal Rumble match to their WWE Vault YouTube channel.

As of October 2026, subscribers in multiple territories, including the US, Canada and the UK, can stream the event on Netflix, thanks to the WWE's ten-year agreement with the company.

== Results ==
No.	Results	Stipulations	Times
1^{D}	Doink the Clown defeated Jim Powers by submission	Singles match	5:57
2	The Steiner Brothers (Rick and Scott) defeated The Beverly Brothers (Beau and Blake) by pinfall	Tag team match	10:34
3	Shawn Michaels (c) defeated Marty Jannetty by pinfall	Singles match for the WWF Intercontinental Championship	14:20
4	Bam Bam Bigelow defeated Big Boss Man by pinfall	Singles match	10:10
5	Bret Hart (c) defeated Razor Ramon by submission	Singles match for the WWF Championship	17:52
6	Yokozuna won by last eliminating Randy Savage	30-man Royal Rumble match for a WWF Championship match at WrestleMania IX	1:06:35
(c) / – the champion(s) heading into the match; D / – this was a dark match

Sensational Sherri was in a neutral corner in the third match.

=== Royal Rumble entrances and eliminations ===
A new entrant came out approximately every two minutes.

Draw	Entrant	Order	Eliminated by	Time	Eliminations
1	Ric Flair	4	Mr. Perfect	18:38	1
2	Bob Backlund	28	Yokozuna	1:01:10	2
3	Papa Shango	1	Ric Flair	00:28	0
4	Ted DiBiase	13	The Undertaker	24:55	4
5	Brian Knobbs	2	Ted DiBiase	02:58	0
6	Virgil	7	The Berzerker	17:08	0
7	Jerry Lawler	6	Mr. Perfect	14:35	2
8	Max Moon	3	Jerry Lawler	01:56	0
9	Genichiro Tenryu	10	The Undertaker	13:17	0
10	Mr. Perfect	8	Jerry Lawler, Koko B. Ware and Ted DiBiase	09:15	3
11	Skinner	5	Mr. Perfect	03:05	0
12	Koko B. Ware	12	Ted DiBiase	08:31	1
13	Samu	9	The Undertaker	04:49	0
14	The Berzerker	14	The Undertaker	05:21	1
15	The Undertaker	15	Giant González	04:14	4
16	Terry Taylor	11	Ted DiBiase	00:24	0
17	Damien Demento	17	Carlos Colón	12:27	0
18	Irwin R. Schyster	19	Earthquake	16:00	0
19	Tatanka	20	Yokozuna	17:34	0
20	Jerry Sags	24	Owen Hart	21:50	0
21	Typhoon	16	Earthquake	05:12	0
22	Fatu	18	Bob Backlund	06:32	0
23	Earthquake	22	Yokozuna	11:00	2
24	Carlos Colón	21	Yokozuna	07:25	1
25	Tito Santana	23	Yokozuna	11:01	0
26	Rick Martel	27	Bob Backlund	11:23	0
27	Yokozuna	-	Winner	14:53	7
28	Owen Hart	25	Yokozuna	05:39	1
29	Repo Man	26	Randy Savage	03:33	0
30	Randy Savage	29	Yokozuna	09:01	1

- Bob Backlund took the record of longevity lasting 1:01:10 in a Royal Rumble, beating the previous time held by Ric Flair from Royal Rumble (1992). This record would stand for 11 years, until Chris Benoit broke it at Royal Rumble (2004).
- Giant González was not an entrant in the Rumble. This was his WWF debut.
- Jerry Lawler was already eliminated when he helped eliminate Mr. Perfect.
