= AWA World Tag Team Championship =

Professional wrestling tag team championship

- The last version of the championship belts used

Details
- Promotion: American Wrestling Association
- Date established: 1960
- Date retired: 1991
Statistics
- First champions: Murder, Inc. (Stan Kowalski and Tiny Mills)
- Most reigns: (as team) The Crusher and Dick the Bruiser (5 times) (as individual) The Crusher (9 times)
- Longest reign: The High Flyers (Jim Brunzell and Greg Gagne) (744 days)
- Shortest reign: Bill Dundee and Jerry Lawler (4 days)

The American Wrestling Association (AWA) World Tag Team Championship was a professional wrestling world tag team championship in the American Wrestling Association from 1960 until the promotion folded in 1991.

== History ==
When the NWA Minneapolis Wrestling and Boxing Club operated by Verne Gagne withdrew from the National Wrestling Alliance in May 1960, Stan Kowalski and Tiny Mills were the recognized champions of the NWA World Tag Team Championship (Minneapolis version). At the time, the AWA continued to recognize the NWA champions as their World champions. However, by August 1960, and having recently recaptured the NWA Tag Team championships for a second time, Kowalski and Mills were recognized as the first AWA World Tag Team Champions when AWA stopped recognizing NWA champions.

As the promotion grew, the AWA World Tag Team Championship became one of the most coveted tag team titles in the United States from the beginning until the late 1980s, when the AWA's talent roster was depleted by the World Wrestling Federation and Jim Crockett Promotions. This led to the retirement of the titles when the AWA closed.

== Title history ==
Key
No.	Overall reign number
Reign	Reign number for the specific champion
Days	Number of days held
†	Championship change is unrecognized by the promotion

No.	Champion	Championship change			Reign statistics		Notes	Ref.
No.	Champion	Date	Event	Location	Reign	Days	Notes	Ref.
1	Murder, Inc. (Stan Kowalski and Tiny Mills)	August 10, 1960	N/A	N/A	1	55 (Note: There are no records of the day the reign began, only the month so the first day of the month is counted.)	Kowalski and Mills were awarded the NWA World Tag Team Championship in August 1960. They were recognized as the first AWA champions when the AWA withdrew from the NWA and recognized its own champions.	
2	Hard Boiled Haggerty and Len Montana / Gene Kiniski	October 4, 1960	Live event	Minneapolis, Minnesota	1	231	Montana suffered a broken leg in a match against Verne Gagne. On March 18, 1961, Haggerty chose Kiniski as his new partner.	
3	Leo Nomellini and Wilbur Snyder	May 23, 1961	Live event	Minneapolis, Minnesota	1	57		
4	Hard Boiled Haggerty and Gene Kiniski	July 19, 1961	Live event	St. Paul, Minnesota	2	20		
—	Vacated	August 8, 1961	Live event	—	—	—	Title vacated after Haggerty and Kiniski split up when Haggerty's interference in a cage match between Kiniski and Verne Gagne backfires.	
5	Hard Boiled Haggerty (3) and Bob Geigel	September 26, 1961	Live event	St. Paul, Minnesota	1	51	Haggerty defeated Kiniski for control of the titles and chose Geigel as his new partner.	
6	Pat Kennedy and Dale Lewis	November 16, 1961	Live event	Rochester, Minnesota	1	7		
7	Bob Geigel (2) and Otto Von Krupp	November 23, 1961	Live event	Rochester, Minnesota	1	40 (Note: There are no records of the day the reign ended, only the month so the first day of the month is counted.)		
—	Vacated	January 2, 1962	—	—	—	—	Title vacated when Von Krupp was injured.	
8	Larry Hennig and Duke Hoffman	January 15, 1962	Live event	St. Paul, Minnesota	1	29	Defeated Ivan and Nikita Kalmikoff in a tournament final.	
9	Bob Geigel (3) and Stan Kowalski (2)	February 13, 1962	Live event	Minneapolis, Minnesota	1	47		
10	The Neilsons (Art Neilson and Stan Neilson)	April 10, 1962	N/A	Cincinnati, Ohio	1	250	This was a "phantom" title change, as no match actually took place.	
11	Mr. High and Mr. Low (Dick Steinborn and Doug Gilbert)	December 16, 1962	Live event	St. Paul, Minnesota	1	16		
12	The Kalmikoffs (Ivan and Karol)	January 1, 1963	Live event	Minneapolis, Minnesota	1	231		
13	The Crusher and Dick the Bruiser	August 20, 1963	Live event	Minneapolis, Minnesota	1	173		
14	Moose Evans and Verne Gagne	February 9, 1964	Live event	Minneapolis, Minnesota	1	14		
15	The Crusher and Dick the Bruiser	February 23, 1964	Live event	St. Paul, Minnesota	2	342		
16	Larry Hennig (2) and Harley Race	January 30, 1965	Live event	Minneapolis, Minnesota	1	175		
17	The Crusher (3) and Verne Gagne (2)	July 24, 1965	Live event	Minneapolis, Minnesota	1	14		
18	Larry Hennig (3) and Harley Race	August 7, 1965	Live event	Minneapolis, Minnesota	2	294		
19	The Crusher (4) and Dick the Bruiser (3)	May 28, 1966	Live event	Minneapolis, Minnesota	3	223		
20	Larry Hennig (4) / Chris Markoff and Harley Race	January 6, 1967	Live event	Chicago, Illinois	3	301	On November 1, 1967, Markoff replaced Hennig, who had his leg broken by Verne Gagne in Winnipeg, Manitoba.	
21	Pat O'Connor and Wilbur Snyder (2)	November 3, 1967	Live event	Chicago, Illinois	1	29		
22	Mitsu Arakawa and Dr. Moto	December 2, 1967	Live event	Chicago, Illinois	1	392		
23	The Crusher (5) and Dick the Bruiser (4)	December 28, 1968	Live event	Chicago, Illinois	4	245		
24	The Vachons (Butcher and Mad Dog)	August 30, 1969	Live event	Chicago, Illinois	1	623		
†	The Von Steigers (Karl Von Steiger and Kurt Von Steiger)	February 23, 1971	Live event	Portland, Oregon	1^{†}	23		
†	The Vachons (Butcher and Mad Dog)	March 18, 1971	Live event	Salem, Oregon	1^{(2)}	58	Defeated The Von Steigers by D.Q.	
25	Red Bastien and Hercules Cortez / The Crusher (6)	May 15, 1971	Live event	Milwaukee, Wisconsin	1	250	In August 1971, Bastien chose The Crusher as his new partner after Cortez was killed in a car accident on July 23.	
26	Nick Bockwinkel and Ray Stevens	January 20, 1972	Live event	Denver, Colorado	1	345		
27	Verne Gagne (3) and Billy Robinson	December 30, 1972	Live event	Minneapolis, Minnesota	1	7		
28	Nick Bockwinkel and Ray Stevens	January 6, 1973	Live event	St. Paul, Minnesota	2	561		
29	The Crusher (7) and Billy Robinson (2)	July 21, 1974	Live event	Green Bay, Wisconsin	1	95		
30	Nick Bockwinkel and Ray Stevens	October 24, 1974	Live event	Winnipeg, Manitoba	3	296		
31	The Crusher (8) and Dick the Bruiser (5)	August 16, 1975	Live event	Chicago, Illinois	5	342		
32	Bobby Duncum and Blackjack Lanza	July 23, 1976	Live event	Chicago, Illinois	1	349		
33	The High Flyers (Jim Brunzell and Greg Gagne)	July 7, 1977	Live event	Winnipeg, Manitoba	1	443		
34	Pat Patterson and Ray Stevens (4)	September 23, 1978	N/A	N/A	1	256	Awarded the titles when Brunzell was injured in a charity softball game.	
35	Verne Gagne (4) and Mad Dog Vachon (3)	June 6, 1979	Live event	Winnipeg, Manitoba	1	410		
36	East-West Connection (Adrian Adonis and Jesse Ventura)	July 20, 1980	Live event	Denver, Colorado	1	329	Won by forfeit when Gagne no-showed scheduled defense.	
37	The High Flyers (Jim Brunzell and Greg Gagne)	June 14, 1981	Live event	Green Bay, Wisconsin	2	742		
38	The Sheiks (Jerry Blackwell and Ken Patera)	June 26, 1983	Live event	Minneapolis, Minnesota	1	315		
39	The Crusher (9) and Baron Von Raschke	May 6, 1984	Live event	Green Bay, Wisconsin	1	111		
40	The Road Warriors (Animal and Hawk)	August 25, 1984	Live event	Las Vegas, Nevada	1	400		
41	Jimmy Garvin and Steve Regal	September 29, 1985	Live event	St. Paul, Minnesota	1	111		
42	Scott Hall and Curt Hennig	January 18, 1986	Live event	Albuquerque, New Mexico	1	119		
43	Buddy Rose and Doug Somers	May 17, 1986	AWA All-Star Wrestling	Hammond, Indiana	1	255	Rose and Somers won the match by countout and were awarded the title despite titles not allowed to change hands in that way.	
44	The Midnight Rockers (Marty Jannetty and Shawn Michaels)	January 27, 1987	Live event	Bloomington, Minnesota	1	118		
45	Soldat Ustinov and Boris Zhukov / Doug Somers (2)	May 25, 1987	Live event	Lake Tahoe, Nevada	1	139	Somers replaced Zhukov in October 1987 after he jumped to the WWF.	
46	Bill Dundee and Jerry Lawler	October 11, 1987	CWA Live event	Memphis, Tennessee	1	8		
47	Dr. D and Héctor Guerrero	October 19, 1987	CWA Live event	Memphis, Tennessee	1	7	Dr. D was local wrestler Carl Styles under a mask.	
48	Bill Dundee and Jerry Lawler	October 26, 1987	CWA Live event	Memphis, Tennessee	2	4		
49	The Midnight Express (Dennis Condrey and Randy Rose)	October 30, 1987	AWA Championship Wrestling	Whitewater, Wisconsin	1	58		
50	The Midnight Rockers (Marty Jannetty and Shawn Michaels)	December 27, 1987	AWA Championship Wrestling	Las Vegas, Nevada	2	83	The Midnight Express defeated The Midnight Rockers on December 27, 1987, and continued to be recognized as AWA World Tag Team Champions into 1988, including making successful title defenses. After a dispute between Dennis Condrey and Verne Gagne over payments, AWA President Stanley Blackburn appeared on television on January 24, 1988, and stated that, after rewatching the December 27, 1987 AWA World Tag Team Title match, he believed that the Midnight Rockers had actually won the match, and they were then retroactively recognized as having been Champions for the past 28 days; Titles were held up on February 15, 1988, after a controversial match with The Rock 'n' Roll Express in Memphis. The Rockers won a rematch on February 22, 1988, also in Memphis, but this was never recognized and they remain two-time champions.	
51	Badd Company (Paul Diamond and Pat Tanaka)	March 19, 1988	AWA Championship Wrestling	Las Vegas, Nevada	1	371		
52	The Olympians (Ken Patera (2) and Brad Rheingans)	March 25, 1989	AWA Championship Wrestling	Rochester, Minnesota	1	177		
—	Vacated	September 18, 1989	—	—	—	—	Title vacated when Patera was injured.	
53	The Destruction Crew (Wayne Bloom and Mike Enos)	October 1, 1989	AWA Championship Wrestling	Rochester, Minnesota	1	314	Defeated Paul Diamond and Greg Gagne in a tournament final.	
54	D.J. Peterson and The Trooper	August 11, 1990	AWA Championship Wrestling	Rochester, Minnesota	1	123		
—	Vacated	December 12, 1990	—	—	—	—		
Championship history is unrecorded from January 1991 to August 1991.
—	Deactivated	August 1991	—	—	—	—	The title became inactive when the AWA close. (Note: There are no records of the day or month this final reign ended, only the year.)	

== List of top combined reigns ==
=== By team ===
Rank	Team	# Of Reigns	Combined Days
1.	The Crusher and Dick the Bruiser	5	1,325
2.	Nick Bockwinkel and Ray Stevens	3	1,202
3.	The High Flyers (Jim Brunzell and Greg Gagne)	2	1,185
4.	Harley Race and Larry Hennig / Chris Markoff (Note: Chris Markoff replaced Larry Hennig in their third reign.)	3	777
5.	The Butcher (The Butcher and Mad Dog Vachon)	2	623
6.	Verne Gagne and Mad Dog Vachon	1	410
7.	The Road Warriors (Animal and Hawk)	1	400
8.	Mitsu Arakawa and Dr. Moto	1	392
9.	The Badd Company (Paul Diamond and Pat Tanaka)	1	371
10.	Bobby Duncum and Blackjack Lanza	1	349
11.	The East-West Connection (Adrian Adonis and Jesse Ventura)	1	329
12.	The Sheiks (Jerry Blackwell and Ken Patera)	1	315
13.	The Destruction Crew (Wayne Bloom and Mike Enos)	1	314
14.	Art and Stan Nielson	1	259
15.	Pat Patterson and Ray Stevens	1	256
16.	Buddy Rose and Doug Somers	1	255
17.	Red Bastien and Hercules Cortez/The Crusher* (Note: The Crusher replaced Hercules Cortez after Cortez died from injuries sustained in a car accident.)	1	250

=== By wrestler ===
Rank	Wrestler	# Of Reigns	Combined Days
1.	The Crusher	9	1,717 (Note: Combined length may not be correct. See above.)
2.	Ray Stevens	4	1,458
3.	Dick the Bruiser	5	1,325
4.	Nick Bockwinkel	3	1,202
5.	Jim Brunzell	2	1,185
5.	Greg Gagne	2	1,185
7.	Mad Dog Vachon	3	1033
8.	Larry Hennig	4	797
9.	Harley Race	3	777
10.	Butcher Vachon	2	623
