= Wayne Bloom =

American professional wrestler (born 1958)

Personal information
- Born: March 22, 1958 (age 68) Minneapolis, Minnesota, U.S.
- Family: Von Wagner (son)

Professional wrestling career
- Ring name(s): Beau Beverly; The Sports Agent; Wayne Bloom; Dan Farren; Hondo “The Honey Bee” Haymaker
- Billed height: 6 ft 4 in (193 cm)
- Billed weight: 257 lb (117 kg)
- Billed from: Minneapolis, Minnesota (as Wayne Bloom); Shaker Heights, Ohio (as Beau Beverly)
- Trained by: Brad Rheingans
- Debut: 1986
- Retired: 1999

Wayne Bloom (born March 22, 1958) is an American retired professional wrestler. He is best known for his appearances with the American Wrestling Association (AWA) and World Championship Wrestling (WCW) under his birth name and with the World Wrestling Federation (WWF) as Beau Beverly. For much of his career, Bloom teamed with Mike Enos as the Destruction Crew / the Beverly Brothers.

== Professional wrestling career ==
=== American Wrestling Association (1988–1991) ===
Wayne Bloom started wrestling with the American Wrestling Association (AWA) in 1988 after being trained by Eddie Sharkey. In the AWA, he competed as Wayne "The Train" Bloom. His initial run as a singles wrestler was not very successful, illustrated by the 24 second loss to Jimmy Valiant at the AWA PPV SuperClash III. After his unsuccessful singles attempts, Bloom formed a tag team called The Destruction Crew with fellow rookie (and Eddie Sharkey student) ”Mean” Mike Enos. In the fall of 1989 Wayne Bloom on behalf of the Destruction Crew challenged then AWA World Tag Team champions Ken Patera and Brad Rheingans to a “car lifting” contest. During the challenge, the Destruction Crew attacked Patera and Rhenigans and injured them (kayfabe). This forced them to vacate the tag team titles.

A tournament was set up to crown new tag-team champions; in the tournament, the Destruction Crew would defeat the team of Sgt. Slaughter & Baron von Raschke in the first round and then beat Greg Gagne and Paul Diamond in the finals to win the titles. Bloom also challenged the returning Brad Rheingans to a Greco-Roman match which Bloom lost. Nevertheless, the Crew's tag team victory combined with their devious tactics earned the duo a joint “Rookie of the Year” award from the readers of Pro Wrestling Illustrated, which is the only time a tag team has won this award. On August 11, 1990, the Destruction Crew lost the AWA tag-team titles to longtime rivals The Trooper and D.J. Peterson. The Crew tried in vain to regain the titles over the following months until the AWA closed up in early 1991.

=== World Championship Wrestling (1990) ===
In 1990, the Destruction Crew joined World Championship Wrestling (WCW), which at the time was still a part of the National Wrestling Alliance (NWA). In WCW, they wrestled under masks as the Minnesota Wrecking Crew 2 and were managed by Ole Anderson (a member of the second incarnation of the Minnesota Wrecking Crew). They attempted without success to win the NWA World Tag Team Championship from the Steiner Brothers over the spring of 1990. During their stint with WCW they were also still under contract with the AWA; in fact, they were the AWA World Tag-Team Champions during their entire run as the masked Minnesota Wrestling Crew 2.

=== World Wrestling Federation (1991–1993) ===
In May 1991, the Destruction Crew went to the World Wrestling Federation (WWF) and became the Beverly Brothers, with Enos and Bloom wrestling under the ring names Blake and Beau Beverly, respectively. Now sporting matching bleach-blonde hair styles and wearing flamboyant purple tights and capes to the ring, their gimmick was that of two spoiled rich brats. They were originally managed by Coach (John Tolos), then by The Genius. The team was initially promoted as a force to be reckoned with in the tag team division. After making their WWF pay-per-view debut on a winning team at Survivor Series '91, they were launched into feuds with the Legion of Doom, The Bushwhackers (whom they defeated at the 1992 Royal Rumble) and The Natural Disasters (whom they unsuccessfully challenged for the WWF World Tag Team Championship at SummerSlam '92). By the later part of 1992, however, they would be used primarily to put over other tag teams; they were on the losing end of an eight-man elimination tag team match at Survivor Series '92 and were defeated by their old rivals The Steiner Brothers at the 1993 Royal Rumble.

=== Late career (1993–1999) ===
In 1993, Bloom left the WWF and also semi-retired from professional wrestling. Yet within a year, he was making sporadic appearances on the independent scene as a singles wrestler among other places during the last days of Herb Abrams’ UWF. Bloom and Enos had a brief reunion in World Championship Wrestling (WCW) in 1998. After a while together, the team finally disbanded for good. Bloom retired from professional wrestling in 1999.

== Personal life ==
Wayne has a son named Cal Bloom (born June 30, 1994) who is also a professional wrestler. In March 2019 he signed with WWE. On the September 14, 2021, edition of NXT, Cal Bloom made his debut in a fatal four-way match, now wrestling under the name Von Wagner.

== Championships and accomplishments ==
- American Wrestling Association
  - AWA World Tag Team Championship (1 time) – with Mike Enos
  - AWA World Tag Team Championship Tournament (1989) – with Mike Enos
- Pro Wrestling Illustrated
  - PWI Rookie of the Year (1989) – with Mike Enos
  - PWI ranked him #92 of the 500 best single wrestlers of the PWI 500 in 1992
  - PWI ranked him #458 of the top 500 singles wrestlers of the PWI Years in 2003

== See also ==
- List of Jewish professional wrestlers
