= Mike Enos =

American professional wrestler

Personal information
- Born: Michael Enos; June 11, 1963 (age 63)

Professional wrestling career
- Ring name(s): Blake Beverly; The Masked Sky Scraper; The Mauler; Mike Enos; Total the Terrible
- Billed height: 6 ft 3 in (191 cm)
- Billed weight: 277 lb (126 kg)
- Billed from: Shaker Heights, Ohio (as Blake Beverley)
- Trained by: Eddie Sharkey
- Debut: 1988
- Retired: 2000

Michael Enos is an American retired professional wrestler. He is best known for his appearances with the American Wrestling Association (AWA) and World Championship Wrestling (WCW) under his birth name and with the World Wrestling Federation (WWF) as Blake Beverly. For much of his career, Enos teamed with Wayne Bloom as The Destruction Crew/The Beverly Brothers.

== Professional wrestling career ==
=== American Wrestling Association (1988–1990) ===
Mike Enos started wrestling in the late 1980s after being trained by Eddie Sharkey. His signing with the AWA was due to trainer Eddie Sharkey’s connections in the federation. Early on, Enos worked mainly as a referee but slowly got more and more bookings as a wrestler. He was billed as "The Construction Worker" Mike Enos, that name was soon replaced by “Mean” Mike Enos, as he teamed up with fellow rookie Wayne "The Train" Bloom to form The Destruction Crew. The Destruction Crew was managed by Johnny Valiant. In the fall of 1989 the Destruction Crew challenged then AWA World Tag Team champions Ken Patera and Brad Rheingans to a "car lifting" contest. During the challenge the Destruction Crew attacked Patera and Rhenigans and injured them (Storyline) and forced them to vacate the tag team titles.

A tournament was set up to crown new tag team champions. In the tournament, the Destruction Crew would defeat the team of Sgt. Slaughter and Baron von Raschke in the first round and then beat Greg Gagne and Paul Diamond in the finals to win the titles. That victory combined with their devious tactics earned the duo a joint Rookie of the Year award from the readers of Pro Wrestling Illustrated, which is the only time a tag team has won the award. At the last original AWA television taping on August 11, 1990, the Destruction Crew lost the AWA tag-team titles to longtime rivals The Trooper and D.J. Peterson.

=== World Championship Wrestling (1990) ===
While still AWA World Tag Team Champions, the Destruction Crew joined World Championship Wrestling during the spring of 1990. In WCW they wrestled under masks as the "Minnesota Wrecking Crew II" and were managed by Ole Anderson who was part of the original Minnesota Wrecking Crew. They attempted without success to win the NWA World Tag Team Championship from the Steiner Brothers during a brief feud. Enos also made a one-off appearance at WrestleWar 1990 as the (masked) third member of The Skyscrapers, called "The Masked Skyscraper." He was a last-minute replacement for Dan Spivey, who had left WCW days earlier.

=== New Japan Pro-Wrestling (1990-1991) ===
After the AWA closed, the Destruction Crew went to Japan and competed in a series of matches in the New Japan Pro-Wrestling including an unsuccessful title match against then IWGP Tag Team Champions Keiji Mutoh and Masahiro Chono on August 19, 1990.

=== World Wrestling Federation (1991–1993) ===
In May 1991, Enos and Bloom signed with the World Wrestling Federation. The two wrestlers were repackaged as a team of spoiled rich brothers from Shaker Heights, Ohio. They became known as the Beverly Brothers, with Enos given the name Blake Beverly while Bloom was given the name Beau Beverly. They were originally managed by Coach, then later on by The Genius. The team was initially promoted as a force to be reckoned with in the tag team division. After making their WWF pay-per-view debut on a winning team at Survivor Series '91, they were launched into feuds with the Legion of Doom, The Bushwhackers (who they defeated at the 1992 Royal Rumble) and The Natural Disasters (who they unsuccessfully challenged for the WWF World Tag Team Championship at SummerSlam '92). By the later part of 1992, however, they would be used primarily to put over other tag teams; they were on the losing end of an eight-man elimination tag team match at Survivor Series '92 and were defeated by their old rivals The Steiner Brothers at the 1993 Royal Rumble. The team broke up in 1993 when Bloom decided to leave the business. Enos stuck around for a while longer, mostly serving as an enhancement talent on the WWF's weekly syndicated shows.

=== Japan and return to Minnesota (1993–1995) ===
After his release from the WWF in August 1993, Enos returned to New Japan Pro Wrestling where he wrestled on his own feuding with Keji Muto. From 1994 to 1995 he teamed with Chris Benoit, Lord Steven Regal and Scott Norton. On July 13, 1995, Enos and Scott Norton lost to Shinya Hashimoto and Junji Hirata for the vacated IWGP Tag Team titles.

Enos returned to Minnesota working for Pro Wrestling America and other independent Minnesota shows. He reunited with Wayne Bloom in 1994 as the Destruction Crew.

=== Return to WCW (1996–1999) ===
Enos returned to WCW in 1996. Enos was initially known as The Mauler, but then returned to wrestling under his real name as he had in the AWA. He teamed with Dick Slater as "Rough & Ready" and once again worked mainly as enhancement talent for tag teams on the rise. He was managed by Col. Rob Parker but did not have much success. A notable moment in Enos' second WCW run was him wrestling against Steve Doll on the May 27, 1996, episode of WCW Monday Nitro when Scott Hall interrupted and made his WCW return, planting the seeds for the New World Order.

Enos and Wayne Bloom had a brief reunion in 1997 and 1998 but remained low-card performers. The team finally disbanded after working a few matches together. Enos competed in the WCW double elimination tournament for the vacated WCW tag team titles in February 1999 teaming with Bobby Duncum Jr. and became one of the final four teams along with Chris Benoit and Dean Malenko, Dave Taylor and Fit Finlay, and Curt Hennig and Barry Windham, until he and Scotty Riggs (replacing Duncum) were eliminated by Benoit and Malenko.

=== Later career (2000) ===
Enos retired from wrestling in 2000 after working on WCW weekend shows, smaller independent shows in Florida, and tours in Japan.

== Personal life ==
In July 2016, Enos was named part of a class action lawsuit filed against WWE which alleged that wrestlers incurred traumatic brain injuries during their tenure and that the company concealed the risks of injury. The suit was litigated by attorney Konstantine Kyros, who has been involved in a number of other lawsuits against WWE. The lawsuit was dismissed by US District Judge Vanessa Lynne Bryant in September 2018.

Enos owns a painting company called Enos Executive Painting in Tampa, Florida, and resides there with his wife and children. He is also a grandfather.

== Championships and accomplishments ==
- American Wrestling Association
  - AWA World Tag Team Championship (1 time) – with Wayne Bloom
  - AWA World Tag Team Championship Tournament (1989) – with Wayne Bloom
- Pro Wrestling Illustrated
  - PWI Rookie of the Year (1989) – with Wayne Bloom
  - PWI ranked him #101 of the 500 best single wrestlers of the PWI 500 in 1992
  - PWI ranked him #439 of the top 500 singles wrestlers of the PWI Years in 2003

== See also ==
- Beverly Brothers
