= The Patriot (wrestler) =

All-American college football player, professional wrestler (1961–2021)

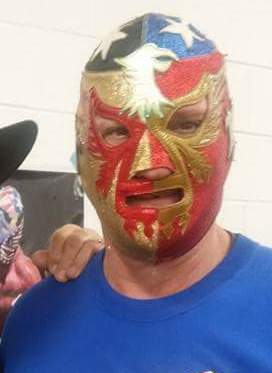
- Wilkes in 2015

Personal information
- Born: Delbert Alexander Wilkes Jr. December 21, 1961 Columbia, South Carolina, U.S.
- Died: June 30, 2021 (aged 59) Newberry, South Carolina, U.S.

Professional wrestling career
- Ring name(s): Del Wilkes; The Patriot; The Trooper
- Billed height: 6 ft 5 in (196 cm)
- Billed weight: 275 lb (125 kg)
- Billed from: Washington, D.C. (WCW); Columbia, South Carolina (WWF)
- Trained by: Verne Gagne; The Fabulous Moolah
- Debut: 1988
- Retired: 1998

Delbert Alexander "Del" Wilkes Jr. (December 21, 1961 – June 30, 2021) was an American professional wrestler and college football player, better known by his ring names, The Trooper and The Patriot. Over the course of his ten-year career, Wilkes wrestled for the American Wrestling Association, the Global Wrestling Federation, All Japan Pro Wrestling, World Championship Wrestling, and the World Wrestling Federation.

== College football career ==
Wilkes as a Gamecock and as The Patriot.

Wilkes was heavily recruited as an offensive lineman at Columbia's Irmo High School and played for the South Carolina Gamecocks. He was one of only four Gamecock consensus All-Americans, the others being George Rogers (1980), Melvin Ingram (2011), and Jadeveon Clowney (2012). Wilkes added 50 pounds of bulk to his six-foot-three, 225-pound frame to bolster an offensive line that in 1984 helped set school records for touchdowns (49), points (371) and total offense (5,095 yards). He knew the Gamecocks would do something special when he met first-year head coach Joe Morrison before the 1983 season. Wilkes had quit the team before Morrison was hired but agreed to meet the new coach and former NFL running back at a Columbia, South Carolina restaurant. Wilkes was selected as an All-American starter in 1984 by the American Football Coaches Association (AFCA), the Associated Press (AP), and the Walter Camp Football Foundation (WC). Despite a stellar collegiate campaign, Wilkes failed to make the NFL's Tampa Bay Buccaneers in 1985 and the Atlanta Falcons in 1986. When football was over for Wilkes, he turned to a pro wrestling career that he found physically grueling, but financially rewarding.

== Professional wrestling career ==
=== American Wrestling Association (1988–1991) ===
Del Wilkes, who from 1980 to 1984 played College Football at South Carolina, started out in the American Wrestling Association in 1988 under his real name for a year, before wrestling under the ring name "The Trooper." He wrote his opponents tickets after beating them as part of his police gimmick and would also hand out plastic police badges to the fans as he came to and from the ring. The Trooper won the AWA World Tag Team Championship with D.J. Peterson on August 11, 1990, at the final AWA television taping. Peterson and Trooper would turn out to be the last AWA World Tag Team Champions. In January 1991, Pro Wrestling Illustrated and its sister publications withdrew recognition of the AWA's World Championship status but continued to recognise Trooper and Peterson as incumbent "AWA Tag Team Champions" until the promotion finally closed later that year. Alongside Paul Diamond, Wilkes also headlined the AWA's near-annual supercard/former PPV, Superclash 4. In a cage match, they were victorious over the Destruction Crew, Wayne Bloom, and Mike Enos.

=== All Japan Pro Wrestling (1990) ===
After AWA folded in August 1990, Wilkes made his first tour to Japan for All Japan Pro Wrestling as the Trooper.

=== Global Wrestling Federation (1991–1992) ===
Wilkes then went on to the Global Wrestling Federation as a fan favorite and became "The Patriot", where he was crowned the first GWF Television Champion in a tournament in 1991. Soon afterwards, the Patriot feuded with Al Perez over the GWF North American Heavyweight Championship, which he won initially on August 10, but the victory was disputed. He won the title again in a rematch against Perez two weeks later. In September 1991, a man calling himself the Dark Patriot appeared in the GWF. For several months, he taunted the Patriot and claimed that he was the Patriot's dark side. On January 31, 1992, the Dark Patriot faced the Patriot in a title match. The Patriot lost the title and left the GWF.

=== South Atlantic Pro Wrestling (1991–1992) ===
Wilkes as the Patriot worked in the North Carolina–based promotion South Atlantic Pro Wrestling.

=== World Wrestling Federation (1991–1992) ===
Wrestling as The Trooper, Wilkes received a tryout match at a WWF Superstars taping in Rockford, Illinois on May 6, 1991, when he defeated WT Jones. The following day in Green Bay, Wisconsin at a Wrestling Challenge taping Wilkes defeated Tom Stone. He returned on November 12, 1991, in a dark match at a Wrestling Challenge taping in Springfield, Massachusetts. Wrestling this time as The Patriot, Wilkes defeated Brooklyn Brawler. He would then appear in five matches in March 1992, wrestling as either Del Wilkes or The Patriot and facing Rick Martel, Kato (Paul Diamond), and Repo Man.

=== World Wrestling Council (1992) ===
Wilkes worked in Puerto Rico's World Wrestling Council in 1992.

=== Return to All Japan Pro Wrestling (1992–1994) ===
In 1992, Wilkes returned to All Japan Pro Wrestling. He had success with Jackie Fulton who wrestled as "The Eagle" to match Wilkes' Patriot gimmick. On June 2, 1993, The Patriot and the Eagle defeated Kenta Kobashi and Tsuyoshi Kikuchi to win the All Asia Tag Team Championship. The Patriot would hold onto the titles for three months, eventually losing them on September 9, 1993, to Doug Furnas and Dan Kroffat. In late 1993, The Patriot and The Eagle entered the 1993 World's Strongest Tag Determination League where they finished in 7th place with 4 Points.

=== World Championship Wrestling (1994–1995) ===
In 1994, Wilkes signed with World Championship Wrestling to form a team with Marcus Alexander Bagwell called Stars and Stripes. They feuded with Pretty Wonderful over the WCW World Tag Team Championship. The two teams battled for the titles and exchanged victories in non-title matches for several months. One week after losing the titles at Fall Brawl '94: War Games, Stars and Stripes defeated Pretty Wonderful on the September 24, 1994 episode of WCW Saturday Night. Stars and Stripes held the titles for a month but lost them back to Pretty Wonderful at Halloween Havoc. On November 16, 1994, at Clash of the Champions XXIX, Stars and Stripes regained the titles in a match where Patriot's mask was on the line. Three weeks later, on December 8, Stars and Stripes lost the titles to Harlem Heat (the match aired on the January 14, 1995 episode of WCW Saturday Night). Wilkes continued wrestling for WCW for several more months until leaving in May 1995.

=== Second Return to AJPW (1995–1997) ===
After no-showing the Slamboree '95: A Legends' Reunion pay-per-view in May 1995, he returned to AJPW. He quickly formed a tag team with Johnny Ace. On August 30, 1995, Wilkes and Ace challenged The Holy Demon Army for the World Tag Team Championship but lost. The two then entered the 1995 World's Strongest Tag Determination League where they finished in 4th place with 13 points.

On January 2, 1996, Wilkes won All Japan's yearly January 2 Heavyweight Battle Royal to give him his second All Japan achievement. For the battle royal victory, Wilkes ended his team with Ace and went into the midcard with little direction. In the spring of 1996, Wilkes entered the 1996 Champion Carnival where he finished in 9th place with 6 points. In the summer of 1996, Wilkes formed a tag team with Kenta Kobashi, on October 12, 1996, they challenged Steve Williams and Johnny Ace for the World Tag Team Championship but they came up short. In November 1996, Wilkes and Kobashi entered the 1996 World's Strongest Tag Determination League where they finished in 3rd place with 16 points, Wilkes even scored a pinfall victory over Toshiaki Kawada.

In early 1997, Wilkes and Kobashi reunited with Johnny Ace and the three formed the stable: GET (Global, Energetic, Tough). Wilkes involvement with the group only lasted a few months as he left All Japan in July 1997.

=== World Wrestling Federation (1997–1998) ===
On June 30, 1997, he was defeated by Rockabilly prior to a television taping in Des Moines, Iowa. His TV debut came two weeks later on the July 14, 1997 episode of Raw is War, and he would go on to feud with Bret Hart. The premise of this feud was that Hart had just started his anti-American Hart Foundation, and the Patriot was, as the name implied, a man who stood up for the United States of America. He wore a mask with American stars and stripes and carried the U.S. flag (using a patriotic entry theme that would be used for the wrestler Kurt Angle a few years later). He defeated Hart on television in a match on July 28, 1997, after interference from Shawn Michaels. On August 11, 1997, Patriot teamed with Ken Shamrock to wrestle the team of The British Bulldog and Owen Hart, The Patriot pinned The British Bulldog for the win. Wilkes went on to challenge Hart for the WWF World Heavyweight Championship at Ground Zero: In Your House where Hart forced him to submit with the Sharpshooter. At One Night Only, Wilkes defeated Flash Funk. At Badd Blood: In Your House, Wilkes teamed with Vader against the Hart Foundation's Bret Hart and The British Bulldog, but lost the match. Following Badd Blood, Patriot was scheduled to team with Vader, Goldust, and Marc Mero as part of Team USA at Survivor Series 1997 but suffered a torn triceps weeks earlier and was replaced by Steve Blackman. Wilkes competed in his final televised WWF match on the November 1, 1997, episode of WWF Shotgun Saturday Night (taped on October 21) where he lost to Jim Neidhart by disqualification. He was released in April 1998.

== Personal life ==
After leaving the WWF, Wilkes retired due to the aforementioned torn triceps. Wilkes admitted that he had used anabolic steroids and cocaine during his career, starting with his college football days. He spent nine months in prison in 2002 for forging a prescription due to his addiction to painkillers. Wilkes then went into addiction recovery and resided in Columbia, South Carolina where he worked at Dick Smith Nissan as a car salesman.

In a July 25, 2007, interview with WACH, Wilkes discussed his career, steroid use, the Chris Benoit tragedy, and various other topics. The last two questions involved saying goodbye to the fans and giving advice to youngsters in the wrestling sport. Wilkes urged young wrestlers to "learn from our mistakes." He said that fifty people whom he once wrestled with in the wrestling sport were now dead. Wilkes appeared on episodes No. 232 and No. 278 of The Steve Austin Show podcast. In 2015, his documentary Behind The Mask was released on DVD.

== Death ==
Wilkes died of a heart attack on June 30, 2021, at the age of 59.

== Championships and accomplishments ==
- All Japan Pro Wrestling
  - All Asia Tag Team Championship (1 time) – with The Eagle
  - January 2 Korakuen Hall Heavyweight Battle Royal (1996)
- American Wrestling Association
  - AWA World Tag Team Championship (1 time, final) – with D.J. Peterson
- Global Wrestling Federation
  - GWF North American Heavyweight Championship (2 times, inaugural)
  - GWF Television Championship (1 time, inaugural)
  - GWF Television Championship Tournament (June 1991)
  - GWF North American Heavyweight Championship Tournament (1991)
- Pro Wrestling Illustrated
  - PWI Most Inspirational Wrestler of the Year (1991)
  - Ranked No. 55 of the top 500 singles wrestlers in the PWI 500 in 1991
  - Ranked No. 208 of the top 500 singles wrestlers during the "PWI Years" in 2003
- World Championship Wrestling
  - WCW World Tag Team Championship (2 times) – with Marcus Alexander Bagwell
