= Beverly Brothers =

Professional wrestling tag team

Tag team
- Members: Beau Beverly / Wayne Bloom; Blake Beverly / Mike Enos
- Name(s): The Beverly Brothers; The Destruction Crew (AWA); Minnesota Wrecking Crew II (NWA)
- Billed heights: Bloom: 6 ft 4 in (1.93 m); Enos: 6 ft 4 in (1.93 m)
- Combined billed weight: 514 lb (233 kg; 36.7 st)
- Billed from: Chicago, Illinois - AWA; Minneapolis, Minnesota - NWA/WCW; Shaker Heights, Ohio - WWF
- Debut: 1989
- Disbanded: 1998
- Years active: 1989–1998
- Trained by: Eddie Sharkey

The Beverly Brothers were a professional wrestling tag team comprising Mike Enos and Wayne Bloom in the World Wrestling Federation. They were also known as The Destruction Crew in the American Wrestling Association and the Minnesota Wrecking Crew 2 in the National Wrestling Alliance. The Destruction Crew won the Pro Wrestling Illustrated 1989 Rookie of the Year award, the only tag team to win this accolade. The team's signature move was a double-team called the Shaker Heights Spike.

== Career ==
=== American Wrestling Association (1989–1991) ===
Mike Enos and Wayne Bloom started out in 1989 in the American Wrestling Association after being trained by Eddie Sharkey and managed by Johnny Valiant. Sporting matching ring attire and carrying sledgehammers to the ring, they were known as "The Destruction Crew". They feuded with The Olympians, Ken Patera and Brad Rheingans, and challenged them to a “car lifting” contest. During the challenge, The Crew attacked The Olympians and, in storyline, injured them. The Olympians' injuries forced them to vacate their AWA Tag Team Championship which were then placed in a tournament. The Crew went on to defeat Greg Gagne and Paul Diamond to win the title tournament on October 1, 1989. They also faced Rheingans and Paul Diamond and in a steel cage match where the former was locked out of the cage only to have his partner decimated by The Destruction Crew. The team finally lost their Tag Team titles on August 11, 1990, to The Trooper and D.J. Peterson. Although neither Enos nor Bloom were technically "rookies," fans voted The Destruction Crew the 1989 Rookie of the Year in Pro Wrestling Illustrated, making them the only tag team to win this award.

By the end of 1990, the AWA was effectively on hiatus and would eventually shut down entirely by May 1991. The Destruction Crew's entrance theme in the AWA was the highly popular Queen song "We Will Rock You", a theme of defeating your opponents in sports and leaving them in humiliation. This was most fitting considering by the time the AWA went under, they were viewed upon as a tag team with one of the best win–loss records in the history of the company.

=== World Championship Wrestling (1990) ===
While still AWA World Tag Team Champions, the Destruction Crew joined World Championship Wrestling during the spring of 1990. In WCW they wrestled under masks as the "Minnesota Wrecking Crew II" and were managed by Ole Anderson who was part of the original Minnesota Wrecking Crew. They attempted without success to win the NWA World Tag Team Championship from The Steiner Brothers during a brief feud.

=== New Japan Pro-Wrestling (1990) ===
After the AWA closed, the Destruction Crew went to Japan and compete in a series of matches in the New Japan Pro-Wrestling including an unsuccessful title match against then IWGP Tag Team Champions Keiji Mutoh and Masahiro Chono on August 19, 1990.

=== World Wrestling Federation (1991–1993) ===
On April 16, 1991, Enos & Bloom received a tryout match for the World Wrestling Federation at a Wrestling Challenge taping in Cedar Rapids, Iowa. In May 1991, the team were transformed into Beau (Bloom) and Blake (Enos), The Beverly Brothers. Now wearing flamboyant purple tights and capes to the ring, their gimmick was that of two spoiled rich brats. They were originally managed by Coach (John Tolos), then by The Genius. They made their televised debut on the June 22 episode of Superstars by defeating enhancement talents Rob Jones and Tom Zeller. After making their WWF pay-per-view debut on a winning team at Survivor Series '91, they were launched into feuds with the Legion of Doom, The Bushwhackers (whom they defeated at the 1992 Royal Rumble) and The Natural Disasters (who they unsuccessfully challenged for the WWF World Tag Team Championship at SummerSlam '92). By the later part of 1992, however, they would be used primarily to put over other tag teams; they were on the losing end of an eight-man elimination tag team match at Survivor Series '92 and were defeated by their old rivals The Steiner Brothers at the 1993 Royal Rumble. Throughout late 1992 and early 1993, they also found themselves in comedic mixed tag team matches, paired with Little Louie against The Bushwhackers and Tiger Jackson.

Bloom left the WWF in April 1993 and semi-retired from professional wrestling while Enos, still under the Blake Beverly moniker, remained in the company for a few months, mainly as enhancement talent on their weekly syndicated shows.

=== Minnesota (1994–1995) ===
They would reunite in Minnesota as the Destruction Crew from their AWA days. During this time they wrestled in the independent circuit. On November 20, they defeated Tekno Team 2000 in at an AWA event in Red wing, Minnesota. In 1995 they once again went their separate ways.

=== World Championship Wrestling (1997–1998) ===
The two had a brief reunion in World Championship Wrestling from 1997 to 1998 for a few matches. They remained low-card performers, and after a few matches together, the team finally disbanded.

== Championships and accomplishments ==
- American Wrestling Association
  - AWA World Tag Team Championship (1 time)
  - AWA World Tag Team Championship Tournament (1989)
- Pro Wrestling Illustrated
  - PWI Rookie of the Year: 1989
