= Brad Rheingans =

American wrestler (born 1953)

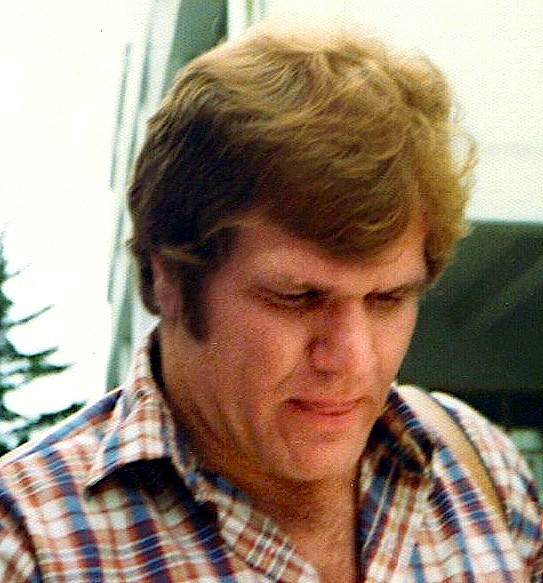
- Rheingans in 1983

Personal information
- Born: Bradley Bert Rheingans; December 13, 1953 (age 72) Appleton, Minnesota, U.S.
- Education: North Dakota State University

Professional wrestling career
- Ring name: Brad Rheingans
- Billed height: 6 ft 0 in (183 cm)
- Billed weight: 260 lb (118 kg)
- Billed from: Appleton, Minnesota
- Trained by: Verne Gagne; Billy Robinson
- Debut: 1980
- Retired: 1995
- Sports career
Medal record
Men's Greco-Roman wrestling
Representing United States
World Championships
Bronze medal – third place	1979 San Diego	100 kg
Pan American Games
Gold medal – first place	1975 Mexico City	100 kg
Gold medal – first place	1979 San Juan	100 kg
Collegiate Wrestling
Representing the North Dakota State Bison
NCAA Division II Championships
Gold medal – first place	1975 East Stroudsburg	190 lb
Silver medal – second place	1974 Fullerton	177 lb

Bradley Bert Rheingans (born December 13, 1953) is an American former Greco-Roman wrestler and professional wrestler. He was a member of the United States' Greco-Roman wrestling teams for the 1976 and 1980 Summer Olympics, as well as winning two gold medals in the 1975 and 1979 Pan American Games and a bronze medal in the 1979 World Wrestling Championships. As a professional, Rheingans co-held the AWA World Tag Team Championship one time.

== Early life ==
Rheingans was born in Appleton, Minnesota. While in high school, he won honors in football, wrestling, and track and field. His high school friends included fellow future professional wrestling personality Eric Bischoff. After graduating high school, Rheingans enrolled in North Dakota State University.

== Amateur wrestling career ==
Originally from Appleton, Rheingans was an NCAA Division II champion in 1975 for North Dakota State University and wrestled in the 1976 Olympics, placing fourth in Greco-Roman wrestling. He qualified for the Olympic team in 1980, but did not compete due to the United States boycott. Between Olympics, he placed third for a bronze medal at the 1979 World Wrestling Championships in Greco-Roman. He was later inducted into the Tribune Hall of Fame. Rheingans also won gold medals in the 1975 and 1979 Pan American Games.

From 1976 to 1977, Rheingans served as assistant wrestling coach for the University of Minnesota. He went on to serve as a coach for the Minnesota Wrestling Club, where he trained Jeff Blatnick for the 1980 Summer Olympics. Like Rheingans, Blatnick qualified for the Olympic team in 1980, but did not compete due to the United States boycott.

== Professional wrestling career ==
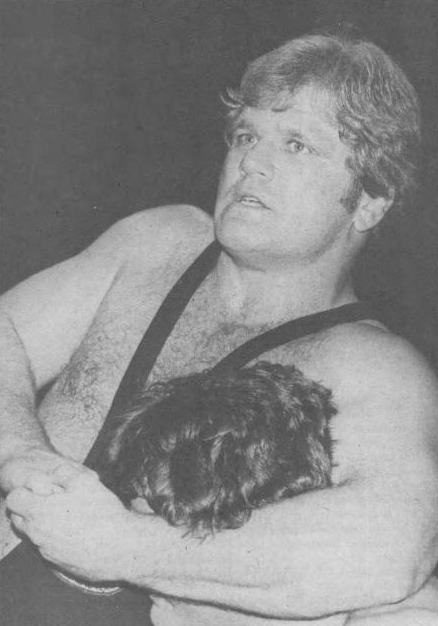
Rheingans during a professional wrestling match, c. 1983

=== American Wrestling Association (1980–1986) ===
Rheingans entered professional wrestling in 1980, training under Verne Gagne and Billy Robinson. He debuted in Gagne's American Wrestling Association (AWA).

=== World Wrestling Federation (1980, 1987) ===
In 1980, Rheingans made an appearance for the World Wrestling Federation (WWF, now WWE) where he defeated Pete Doherty. He returned as an enhancement talent in 1987.

=== Return to American Wrestling Association (1988–1990) ===
He worked for the AWA again in 1989 where he and Ken Patera formed The Olympians tag team and beat Badd Company for the AWA World Tag Team Championship but were forced to vacate the belts when Patera was kayfabe injured in a strongman contest by The Destruction Crew who subsequently won the vacant title. Rheingans worked for AWA until August 1990 when the company went bankrupt. Afterwards, he worked for various independent promotions in the Minnesota area during the early half of the 1990s.

=== World Championship Wrestling (1989–1990) ===
Rheingans also wrestled occasionally for World Championship Wrestling (WCW) from 1989 to 1990.

=== New Japan Pro-Wrestling (1989–1993) ===
In 1989, Rheingans began touring Japan with New Japan Pro-Wrestling (NJPW), allying himself with his former trainee Leon White, now known as Big Van Vader, and Buzz Sawyer in battling Antonio Inoki, Tatsumi Fujinami, Riki Choshu and Kengo Kimura, but later, he would aid New Japan in their battle against USSR amateur wrestlers such as Salman Hashimikov, Victor Zangiev, Vladimir Berkovich, Timur Zalasov and Wahka Evloev for the remainder of the year. In 1990, he started to help training young wrestlers on the NJPW Dojo, most notably Koji Kitao and Osamu Nishimura. In that time his most notable match was against another decorated amateur wrestler in Victor Zangiev from the Soviet Union on February 10 at the Tokyo Dome, in a winning effort. Later on, he would only engage against young lions such as Michiyoshi Ohara, Hiroyoshi Yamamoto, Manabu Nakanishi, Yuji Nagata and many others. His last match on New Japan saw Rheingans defeat El Samurai on December 11, 1993.

=== Retirement ===
Rheingans retired in 1995 after undergoing major reconstructive surgery on both knees. After recovering, he began working as a trainer and as the American booker for NJPW, hiring wrestlers to tour Japan with the promotion. In the early 1990s, Rheingans helped broker a working agreement between NJPW and World Championship Wrestling.

After retiring, Rheingans opened the World Wide School of Professional Wrestling in Hamel, Minnesota.

Rheingans was inducted into the George Tragos/Lou Thesz Professional Wrestling Hall of Fame in 2004.

== Championships and accomplishments ==
=== Amateur wrestling ===
- Alan & Gloria Rice Greco-Roman Hall of Champions
  - Class of 2014
- Amateur Athletic Union Greco-Roman National Championships
  - Winner, 220 lbs class (1979)
- National Collegiate Athletic Association
  - NCAA Division I All-American (1975)
  - NCAA Division II Champion (1975)
- Olympic Games
  - United States Greco-Roman wrestling team member (1976, 1980)
- Pan American Games
  - Gold medal, 220 lbs class (1975, 1979)
- World Cup of Amateur Wrestling
  - Winner, 220 lbs class (1976)
- World Wrestling Championships
  - Bronze medal (1979)

=== Professional wrestling ===
- American Wrestling Association
  - AWA World Tag Team Championship (1 time) – with Ken Patera
- George Tragos/Lou Thesz Professional Wrestling Hall of Fame
  - Class of 2004
- Pro Wrestling America
  - PWA Tag Team Championship (1 time) – with Baron von Raschke
- Wrestling Observer Newsletter
  - Rookie of the Year (1981) shared with Brad Armstrong
