= Survivor Series (1991) =

World Wrestling Federation pay-per-view event

- Promotional poster featuring Hulk Hogan and The Undertaker
- Promotion: World Wrestling Federation
- Date: November 27, 1991
- City: Detroit, Michigan
- Venue: Joe Louis Arena
- Attendance: 17,500
- Tagline: The Gravest Challenge

Pay-per-view chronology
← Previous; SummerSlam	Next → This Tuesday in Texas

Survivor Series chronology
← Previous; 1990	Next → 1992

The 1991 Survivor Series was a professional wrestling pay-per-view (PPV) event produced by the World Wrestling Federation (WWF, renamed WWE in 2002). It was the fifth annual Survivor Series event and took place on Thanksgiving Eve in the United States on Wednesday, November 27, 1991, at the Joe Louis Arena in Detroit, Michigan; this was the first Survivor Series held on Thanksgiving Eve instead of Thanksgiving Day. The event centered on the Survivor Series match, a tag team elimination match that pits teams of multiple wrestlers against each other.

The pay-per-view broadcast consisted of five matches, and there was also one dark match before the event aired live. The main event was a three-on-three Survivor Series match in which the team of Big Boss Man and The Legion of Doom (Hawk and Animal) defeated the team of Irwin R. Schyster and The Natural Disasters (Earthquake and Typhoon). This was the first Survivor Series to feature a singles match of any kind, which served as one of the card's main matches where The Undertaker defeated Hulk Hogan to win the WWF Championship. The undercard featured three other Survivor Series matches.

== Production ==
The fifth annual Survivor Series event was held at the Joe Louis Arena in Detroit, Michigan.

=== Background ===
Survivor Series is an annual professional wrestling pay-per-view (PPV) event, produced every November by the World Wrestling Federation (WWF, renamed WWE in 2002) since 1987, held around Thanksgiving in the United States. In what has become the second longest-running PPV event in history (behind WWE's WrestleMania), it is one of the promotion's original four PPVs, along with WrestleMania, Royal Rumble, and SummerSlam, referred to as the "Big Four". The event is traditionally characterized by having Survivor Series matches, which are tag team elimination matches. The fifth Survivor Series was the first to not exclusively consist of Survivor Series matches. The only non-Survivor Series match on the card was for the WWF Championship, which was the first time it was defended at a Survivor Series. Unlike the prior four events, which were all held on Thanksgiving Day, the fifth Survivor Series event was scheduled to be held on Thanksgiving Eve on Wednesday, November 27, 1991, at the Joe Louis Arena in Detroit, Michigan.

=== Storylines ===
Other on-screen personnel
Role:	Name:
Commentator	Gorilla Monsoon
Commentator	Bobby Heenan
Interviewer	Gene Okerlund
Interviewer	Sean Mooney
Ring announcer	Howard Finkel
Referee	Earl Hebner
Referee	Mike Chioda
Referee	Danny Davis
Referee	Joey Marella
Referee	John Binella

The main event heading into the event was between World Wrestling Federation Champion Hulk Hogan, and The Undertaker for the World Wrestling Federation Championship. Hogan reclaimed the World Wrestling Federation Championship at WrestleMania VII. The Undertaker debuted in the World Wrestling Federation at the previous year’s Survivor Series. Since debuting, Undertaker had yet to be pinned in a televised match (although he did suffer several pinfall losses at untelevised arena shows). This earned him a shot at Hogan's championship, billing the match as Hogan’s “Gravest Challenge”.

Ric Flair arrived in the World Wrestling Federation on September 9, 1991, claiming to be the “Real World's Champion”. He debuted carrying the WCW World Heavyweight Championship with him, which he had not lost prior to his departure from the company. He immediately began feuding with Roddy Piper. Both men would captain their teams at Survivor Series. Piper's team would consist of Bret Hart, The British Bulldog, and Virgil, while Flair would team with Ted DiBiase, The Mountie, and The Warlord. There were multiple storylines between the two teams as DiBiase and Virgil had been feuding since January's Royal Rumble, The Mountie had begun challenging Bret Hart for the Intercontinental Championship, with the Warlord and The British Bulldog also involved in a lengthy program.

Sid Justice was originally scheduled to join the Big Boss Man and the Legion of Doom while Jake Roberts was originally scheduled to join Irwin R. Schyster and The Natural Disasters. After Justice was sidelined due to an elbow injury, Randy Savage began campaigning to take Sid’s place due to Roberts and the Undertaker crashing Savage and Miss Elizabeth's wedding reception at Summerslam and attacking Savage. Savage would have to be reinstated to take part in the event due to losing a retirement match to the Ultimate Warrior at WrestleMania 7. However, at a television taping for WWF Superstars of Wrestling (which would air November 23), Roberts baited Savage into the ring where he would attack him, tying him in the ropes before allowing his King Cobra to bite Savage. Savage would not be reinstated for the match and Roberts would also not be allowed to compete in the match due to his actions.

The Hogan-Undertaker and Savage-Roberts feuds would continue to build toward the WWF's next pay-per-view event, This Tuesday in Texas.

Jim Neidhart, The Dragon, and Big Bully Busick were originally scheduled for the second Survivor Series match on the show but were pulled from the event.

== Aftermath ==
Due to Ric Flair's involvement in the events leading to The Undertaker's WWF World Heavyweight Championship victory over Hulk Hogan, a rematch was immediately signed for the This Tuesday in Texas pay-per-view event, contested December 3 at the Freeman Coliseum in San Antonio, Texas. WWF president Jack Tunney was present at ringside to make sure there was no outside interference. During the match, Flair once again attempted to interfere on The Undertaker's behalf, but – in a chaotic series of events that saw Tunney get knocked out – Hogan was able to pin The Undertaker after throwing ash from manager Paul Bearer's urn in his eyes. The following weekend, Jack Tunney vacated the WWF Championship due to the controversial finishes of the last two matches between Hogan and Undertaker and put the title up for grabs at the 1992 Royal Rumble. Meanwhile, Hogan and Flair began wrestling in a series of matches that had been highly anticipated since the late 1980s.

Dissension had been brewing for weeks between Shawn Michaels and Marty Jannetty of the Rockers, and at their Survivor Series match the two argued after Jannetty caused Michaels to be eliminated by accidentally slamming one of The Nasty Boys into him. In a segment of Brutus "the Barber" Beefcake's "Barber Shop" talk show segment taped on December 2 and aired on January 12, the two aired their grievances before seemingly resolving to stick together and work through their difficulties. However, Michaels superkicked Jannetty and threw him through a plate-glass window that was part of Beefcake's set, cementing Michaels' heel turn. A feud was commissioned, but Jannetty was fired in January 1992, shortly before their first match was to take place; the two eventually met in a series of matches in 1993 when Jannetty returned. However, for Michaels, the "Barber Shop" segment and the superkick jumpstarted his career, which would continue to grow during the 1990s and 2000s.

Following their match, Hulk Hogan went backstage and made a real life allegation to Vince McMahon that the tombstone piledriver which The Undertaker delivered to him at the end of the match gave him a neck injury. Hogan would make this allegation while lying on the floor in McMahon's office, with paramedics also coming to treat the alleged injury. However, Hogan's neck injury claim would be shown to be untruthful, with The Undertaker also noting, including to Hogan while backstage at Tuesday in Texas, that he witnessed Hogan's head not touching the mat. A photo of The Undertaker's delivery of the tombstone piledriver to Hogan which Jim Ross and Conrad Thompson produced on the January 8, 2024 episode of Ross' Grillin' JR with Jim Ross podcast also showed that despite even the storyline claim of Hogan's head hitting the chair while being tombstoned, Hogan's head actually did not touch the chair, with The Undertaker also carefully hooking Hogan under the shoulder, and not around the waist as alleged, while giving him the tombstone piledriver.

== Home Video Release and Streaming ==
The event was released on VHS in 1992 by Coliseum Video in the United States and by Silver Vision in the United Kingdom. The UK tape came initially came with a double-sided limited edition poster that featured Hulk Hogan and The Undertaker.

In November 2005, the event was re-released on DVD in the UK, as part of Silver Vision's Tagged Classics series. It was paired with Survivor Series 1992.

The event was included on the WWE Network streaming service from its launch in 2014 to the platform's closure in 2026. In November 2025, the WWE uploaded the full event to its WWE Vault YouTube channel.

== Results ==
No.	Results	Stipulations	Times
1^{D}	Chris Chavis defeated Kato	Singles match	7:44
2	Ric Flair, The Mountie, Ted DiBiase, and The Warlord (with Mr. Perfect, Jimmy Hart, Sensational Sherri, and Harvey Wippleman) defeated Roddy Piper, Bret Hart, Virgil, and The British Bulldog	4-on-4 Survivor Series match^{Eliminations}	22:48
3	Sgt. Slaughter, Jim Duggan, The Texas Tornado, and El Matador defeated Col. Mustafa, The Berzerker, Skinner, and Hercules (with General Adnan and Mr. Fuji)	4-on-4 Survivor Series match^{Eliminations}	14:19
4	The Undertaker (with Paul Bearer) defeated Hulk Hogan (c)	Singles match for the WWF Championship	12:45
5	The Nasty Boys (Brian Knobbs and Jerry Sags) and The Beverly Brothers (Beau and Blake) (with Jimmy Hart and The Genius) defeated The Rockers (Shawn Michaels and Marty Jannetty) and The Bushwhackers (Luke and Butch)	4-on-4 Survivor Series match^{Eliminations}	23:06
6	Big Boss Man and The Legion of Doom (Hawk and Animal) defeated Irwin R. Schyster and The Natural Disasters (Earthquake and Typhoon) (with Jimmy Hart)	3-on-3 Survivor Series match^{Eliminations}	15:21
(c) / – the champion(s) heading into the match; D / – this was a dark match

=== Survivor Series matches ===
^1

Eliminated	Wrestler	Eliminated by	Method	Time
1	The British Bulldog	Ric Flair	Pinfall	10:55
2	The Warlord	Roddy Piper	Pinfall	17:00
3	Ted DiBiase	N/A	DQ	22:48
3	The Mountie	N/A	DQ	22:48
3	Roddy Piper	N/A	DQ	22:48
3	Bret Hart	N/A	DQ	22:48
3	Virgil	N/A	DQ	22:48
Sole Survivor:	Ric Flair			

^2

Eliminated	Wrestler	Eliminated by	Method	Time
1	Col. Mustafa	Sgt. Slaughter	Pinfall	7:57
2	Hercules	El Matador	Pinfall	12:05
3	Skinner	Sgt. Slaughter	Pinfall	13:31
4	The Berzerker	Jim Duggan	Pinfall	14:19
Survivors:	Jim Duggan, Sgt. Slaughter, The Texas Tornado and El Matador (Clean Sweep)			

^3

Eliminated	Wrestler	Eliminated by	Method	Time
1	Bushwacker Luke	Brian Knobbs	Pinfall	5:21
2	Bushwacker Butch	Beau Beverly	Pinfall	10:13
3	Beau Beverly	Shawn Michaels	Pinfall	14.30
4	Shawn Michaels	Brian Knobbs	Pinfall	19:41
5	Marty Jannetty	Jerry Sags	Pinfall	23:06
Survivors:	Brian Knobbs, Jerry Sags, and Blake Beverly			

^4

Eliminated	Wrestler	Eliminated by	Method	Time
1	Big Boss Man	Irwin R. Schyster	Pinfall	6:23
2	Typhoon	Hawk	Pinfall	9:55
3	Earthquake	N/A	Countout	10:05
4	Irwin R. Schyster	Animal	Pinfall	15:21
Survivors:	Animal and Hawk			
