= This Tuesday in Texas =

1991 World Wrestling Federation pay-per-view event

- Promotion: World Wrestling Federation
- Date: December 3, 1991
- City: San Antonio, Texas
- Venue: Freeman Coliseum
- Attendance: 8,000

Pay-per-view chronology
← Previous; Survivor Series	Next → Royal Rumble

This Tuesday in Texas was a 1991 professional wrestling pay-per-view (PPV) event produced by the World Wrestling Federation (WWF, renamed WWE in 2002). It took place on December 3, 1991, at the Freeman Coliseum in San Antonio, Texas. The event was an attempt by the WWF to establish Tuesday as a secondary night for PPV events. Lukewarm reaction and a disappointing 1.0 buyrate rendered the experiment a failure, and the company shelved its plans until October 2004 when it held Taboo Tuesday (with the exception of the emergency second night of In Your House 8: Beware of Dog in 1996, after the original Sunday showing suffered from power failures).

Five matches were scheduled on the card. The main event was a rematch for the WWF Championship, which saw Hulk Hogan defeat the champion The Undertaker to regain the title. Hogan had lost the championship six days earlier at Survivor Series in a controversial finish. The featured bout on the undercard saw Randy Savage, in his first match since WrestleMania VII, defeat Jake Roberts.

== Production ==
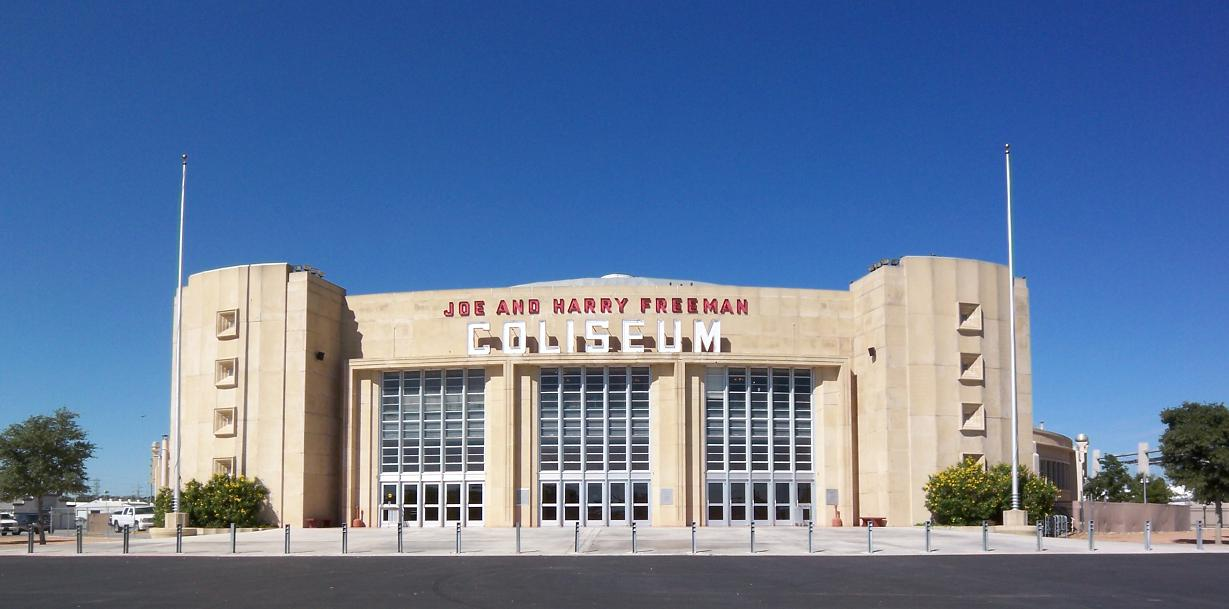
The event was held at the Freeman Coliseum in San Antonio, Texas.

=== Background ===
In 1991, the professional wrestling promotion World Wrestling Federation (WWF, renamed WWE in 2002) scheduled a pay-per-view (PPV) event titled This Tuesday in Texas. It was held on December 3, 1991, at the Freeman Coliseum in San Antonio, Texas. This was the WWF's attempt to establish Tuesday as a secondary night for PPV events.

=== Storylines ===
This Tuesday in Texas featured professional wrestling matches involving different wrestlers from existing scripted feuds, plots, and storylines that were played out on Superstars of Wrestling, Wrestling Challenge, and Prime Time Wrestling — the WWF's television programs.

During the late summer of 1991, Ric Flair, a multi-time world champion in the rival National Wrestling Alliance and World Championship Wrestling, signed with the WWF and, appearing on television with his "Big Gold Belt," began targeting WWF World Heavyweight Champion Hulk Hogan and declaring himself "The Real World Champion." A feud with Hogan, long-anticipated by fans since the late 1980s, was quickly conceived, and escalated at Survivor Series when he helped The Undertaker defeat Hogan for the WWF World Heavyweight Championship. Due to Flair's involvement in the match, a rematch was immediately signed, with WWF president Jack Tunney announcing he would be present at ringside to make sure there was no outside interference.

Another feud leading into the event was between Jake Roberts and Randy Savage. The feud had its roots in an earlier feud that The Undertaker had been having with The Ultimate Warrior, where Roberts had offered to help Warrior conquer Undertaker but instead turned heel and revealed he had been working with Undertaker all along. However, circumstances led to Warrior leaving the company after SummerSlam in August. At the same event, Roberts' and Savage's new feud started when he and Undertaker crashed the wedding reception for Savage and Miss Elizabeth (in kayfabe, as they had been married in real life for nearly seven years). Roberts then began insulting Savage in a series of promos across the country, with Savage precluded from doing anything about it due to his forced retirement from the ring after losing to Warrior at WrestleMania VII earlier in the year. The insults grew more personal and vicious through the fall of 1991, but despite Savage's best efforts to get himself reinstated Tunney continued to hold him to the retirement stipulation. Eventually, Savage had enough and, while doing color commentary duties on WWF Superstars, came to the ring to confront Roberts, who was delivering an anti-Savage promo. However, Roberts caught Savage and severely beat him before tying him into the ring ropes and allowing a cobra to bite his arm. This incident was the last straw for Tunney regarding Roberts, and he reinstated Savage to the active roster.

== Event ==
The first match to air live on pay-per-view (PPV) was a standard singles match for the WWF Intercontinental Championship between the challenger, Skinner and the champion, Bret Hart. Hart controlled the first few minutes of the match until Skinner rammed Hart's shoulder into the ring post. Skinner then retained control for most of the match until he attempted a move from the middle rope which was countered when Hart raised his leg and connected with a boot to Skinner's face. Shortly afterward, Skinner climbed the ropes again but was grabbed and slammed to the mat. Hart then applied his finishing move, the Sharpshooter, and forced Skinner to submit, therefore retaining the championship.

The next match was a singles match between Jake Roberts and Randy Savage. While Roberts was making his entrance, Savage rushed down the aisle and attacked Roberts from behind. Savage spent the next few minutes on the offense until the referee stepped between the two competitors, which allowed Roberts to deliver a blow to Savage's lower abdomen. Roberts then tossed Savage over the top rope to the floor, giving himself time to recover from Savage's relentless attack. Roberts took control of the match, focusing the majority of his punishment on Savage's injured arm. At about the six-minute mark of the match, Roberts grabbed Savage in preparation for his finishing move, the DDT, when Savage countered by driving him backwards into the corner, ramming his shoulder into Roberts' ribs. This caused Roberts to stumble out of the corner and fall to the mat in pain, allowing Savage to climb the ropes and perform his diving elbow drop finisher and pin Roberts for the victory. After the match, Savage wanted to inflict more punishment on Roberts and grabbed a steel chair but it was taken away by a ringside official. Savage then grabbed the timekeeping bell but became caught in a tug-of-war with the referee, which allowed Roberts to perform a DDT on Savage. About a minute later, Roberts delivered a second DDT to Savage. Roberts then reached under the ring and pulled out a bag, similar to the one that normally contained his King Cobra. Miss Elizabeth then ran to the ring and draped herself over Savage, attempting to prevent Roberts from harming him any further. It did not work however, as Roberts got hold of him and delivered a third DDT and followed that up with a slap to Elizabeth's face. A second referee then arrived to help escort Roberts out of the ring. WWF President (kayfabe) Jack Tunney finally came to ringside to make sure Roberts left without any further incident.

The following match was a singles match in which The Warlord (with Harvey Wippleman) battled The British Bulldog. The action was back-and-forth for a majority of the match until Warlord gained a more prolonged control and attempted to perform his finishing hold, a full nelson, but could not get his hands locked to fully apply the hold. Eventually, Warlord released the hold and threw Bulldog to the mat. Warlord picked up Bulldog, sent him into the corner and charged after him. Bulldog countered with a boot to the face, followed by a clothesline from the middle rope. Bulldog performed his signature delayed suplex and attempted a pinfall but Warlord powered out by tossing Bulldog off of him. Bulldog then attempted his finishing move, a running powerslam, but Warlord blocked it by grabbing hold of the top rope. Bulldog tried to jerk him loose but pulled too hard and Warlord fell on top of him for a two count. Warlord then sent Bulldog into the ropes but Bulldog stepped around him and applied a crucifix and scored the victory.

Other on-screen personnel
Role:	Name:
Commentator	Gorilla Monsoon
Commentator	Bobby Heenan
Interviewer	Sean Mooney
Interviewer	Gene Okerlund
Ring announcer	Howard Finkel
Referee	Danny Davis
Referee	Earl Hebner
Referee	Joey Marella

The next match was a tag team match featuring The Repo Man and Ted DiBiase (with Sensational Sherri) versus El Matador and Virgil. The opening few minutes of the match were controlled by El Matador and Virgil until DiBiase hit Virgil, who was charging towards him in the corner, with an elbow to the chest. Repo Man and DiBiase then took turns wearing down Virgil until he managed to hit DiBiase with a neckbreaker and tagged in El Matador. After a flurry of attacks, El Matador attempted his finishing move, a running leaping forearm club, but was tripped from the outside of the ring by DiBiase. El Matador was then knocked over the top rope by Repo Man, where DiBiase threw him into the steel ring steps while the referee was occupied with Repo Man and Virgil on the other side of the ring. After a double-clothesline, Repo Man and El Matador each made a tag to their teammate. Soon all four participants were in the ring when Sherri climbed the apron and attempted to hit Virgil with her high-heel shoe, however, he ducked and the shoe hit DiBiase instead. Virgil, angry with Sherri's attempted interference, grabbed her but was nailed with a knee to the kidney by Repo Man. This allowed DiBiase to cover Virgil for the pinfall and the win.

The following was the last match of the event, contested for the WWF Championship between the champion, The Undertaker (with Paul Bearer) and the challenger, Hulk Hogan. Jack Tunney was present at ringside to ensure there would be no outside interference. Undertaker was introduced first, followed by Hogan who slid into the ring underneath the ropes and was met by Undertaker and Bearer who both began kicking him. After a few kicks, Hogan got to his feet, grabbed them and knocked their heads into one another. Bearer rolled out of the ring, leaving 'Taker and Hogan in the ring to begin the match. Hogan began with a series of attacks but had little to no effect on the Undertaker. After being clotheslined over the top rope, Undertaker grabbed Hogan's ankles, dragged him out of the ring and delivered a thrust to the throat. Undertaker took control of the match until Hogan began a comeback, which prompted Ric Flair to arrive at ringside. He was confronted by Jack Tunney who tried to stop him from getting involved. Hogan took it upon himself to stop Flair by giving him a chair shot to the back, which knocked him into Tunney, sending both of them to the ground, with Flair landing on top of Tunney. With Tunney temporarily knocked-out, Flair climbed onto the apron and held up a steel chair for 'Taker to ram Hogan into. However, Hogan was able to stop his momentum and instead flung Undertaker into the chair. The Undertaker recovered and grabbed Hogan from behind to let Bearer hit him with the urn, but Hogan ducked and Bearer struck Undertaker. Hogan took the urn, opened it, and grabbed a handful of ashes which he threw into Undertaker's eyes. Meanwhile, Flair had begun to revive Tunney enough for him to see what was occurring. Hogan then pinned Undertaker with a roll up to win the WWF Championship.

== Reception ==
The WWF earned approximately $100,000 in ticket sales with an attendance of 8,000. The pay-per-view received a buyrate of 1.0, which is the equivalent of approximately 400,000 buys. The event was featured on the WWF Supertape '92 home video, which was released on VHS in the United States on January 23, 1992, by Coliseum Video.

== Aftermath ==
The following weekend, Tunney stripped Hogan of the WWF Championship and declared the title vacant due to the controversial circumstances that had surrounded the two Hogan-Undertaker matches. He then declared that the upcoming Royal Rumble match, which was scheduled for January 1992, would be contested for the vacant title and the winner of the match would become the new champion. Tunney gave Hogan and Undertaker an advantage and reserved two of the final eleven entry spots (20-30) for them to draw. The Undertaker drew number 20 while Hogan, the two-time defending Rumble winner, drew number 26. Flair drew number 3. Hogan went on to eliminate Undertaker, while he himself was turned on and eliminated by his own ally Sid Justice. Unhappy with Justice's actions, Hogan remained at ringside arguing with Sid and repaid the favor by assisting Ric Flair in eliminating the big man from the Rumble match, resulting in Flair winning the match and the vacant WWF Championship. The events surrounding the Rumble would lead to a match between Hogan and Justice at WrestleMania VIII, which Hogan won by disqualification.

Jake Roberts and Randy Savage continued to feud for the next couple months. This included Savage eliminating Roberts during the Royal Rumble match and ended following a match between the two on the February 8, 1992 Saturday Night's Main Event XXX. After losing the match, an enraged Roberts waited backstage for Savage and Elizabeth to arrive while announcing that he was going to hit with a steel chair whoever entered first. Roberts reared back when he saw Elizabeth come through the entrance, but The Undertaker grabbed the chair and refused to let Roberts hit Elizabeth. The act resulted in The Undertaker becoming a face for the first time in his career and began a feud between him and his former ally Roberts that culminated at WrestleMania VIII when Undertaker emerged victorious. The feud, however, was brief as Roberts left the WWF almost immediately after WrestleMania due to issues with Vince McMahon.

Although their match against the Legion of Doom was not broadcast as part of the pay-per-view event, This Tuesday In Texas marked one of the final major appearances of The Rockers as a tag team. A day earlier, "The Barber Shop" segment wherein Shawn Michaels turned heel by sneak-attacking Marty Jannetty was taped for airing on television in early January 1992. Michaels and Janetty would continue to team, mostly at untelevised house shows with their "dissention in the ranks" storyline continuing, until the "Barber Shop" segment was aired on WWF Wrestling Challenge.

== Home media and streaming ==
The televised matches were all released on VHS by Coliseum Video in the United States and by Silver Vision in the United Kingdom. Unlike previous WWF pay-per-view events, it did not get its own release. Instead, the matches appeared on WWF Supertape '92.

In 2014, the event was included on the WWE's streaming platform the WWE Network as part of its launch and remained on the service until the platform closed. In December 2025, WWE uploaded the event to stream freely on their WWE Vault YouTube channel.

== Results ==
No.	Results	Stipulations	Times
1^{D}	The Harris Brothers (Ron and Don) defeated Brian Costello and Brian Donahue	Tag team match	—
2^{D}	Sir Charles defeated Dale Wolfe	Singles match	—
3^{D}	Chris Walker defeated Brian Lee	Singles match	—
4^{D}	Chris Chavis defeated J. W. Storm	Singles match	—
5^{D}	Greg Valentine defeated The Brooklyn Brawler	Singles match	2:06
6^{D}	The Nasty Boys (Brian Knobbs and Jerry Sags) defeated The Bushwhackers (Luke and Butch)	Tag team match	9:43
7^{D}	The Legion of Doom (Hawk and Animal) (c) defeated The Rockers (Shawn Michaels and Marty Jannetty)	Tag team match for the WWF Tag Team Championship	12:58
8^{D}	The Legion of Doom (Hawk and Animal) (c) defeated The Natural Disasters (Earthquake and Typhoon)	Tag team match for the WWF Tag Team Championship	10:26
9^{D}	Ric Flair defeated Roddy Piper	Singles match	14:30
10	Bret Hart (c) defeated Skinner by submission	Singles match for the WWF Intercontinental Championship	13:46
11	Randy Savage (with Miss Elizabeth) defeated Jake Roberts	Singles match	6:25
12	The British Bulldog defeated The Warlord (with Harvey Wippleman)	Singles match	12:45
13	Repo Man and Ted DiBiase (with Sensational Sherri) defeated El Matador and Virgil	Tag team match	11:28
14	Hulk Hogan defeated The Undertaker (c) (with Paul Bearer)	Singles match for the WWF Championship	13:09
(c) / – the champion(s) heading into the match; D / – this was a dark match
