= SummerSlam (1991) =

World Wrestling Federation pay-per-view event

- Promotional poster
- Promotion: World Wrestling Federation
- Date: August 26, 1991
- City: Manhattan, New York
- Venue: Madison Square Garden
- Attendance: 20,000
- Tagline: A Match Made in Heaven...A Match Made in Hell

Pay-per-view chronology
← Previous; WrestleMania VII	Next → Survivor Series

SummerSlam chronology
← Previous; 1990	Next → 1992

The 1991 SummerSlam was a professional wrestling pay-per-view (PPV) event produced by the World Wrestling Federation (WWF, renamed WWE in 2002). It was the fourth annual SummerSlam and took place on Monday, August 26, 1991, from Madison Square Garden (MSG) in the New York City borough of Manhattan, New York. This was the second SummerSlam at MSG, after the inaugural 1988 event. Nine matches were contested at the event, including a dark match held before the live broadcast.

The event is remembered for the on-screen wedding of Randy Savage and Miss Elizabeth, dubbed "A Match Made in Heaven" by announcer Gene Okerlund. Savage and Elizabeth had been married in real life since December 1984. WWF personalities shown at the reception afterward included Bobby Heenan, Gene Okerlund, J. J. Dillon, The Undertaker, and Jake Roberts. The last two were uninvited guests. Roberts proceeded to frighten Elizabeth with his snake while Undertaker attacked Savage with an urn.

This was contrasted with "A Match Made in Hell", the main event of the show, which was a handicap tag team match between WWF Champion Hulk Hogan and Ultimate Warrior against Sgt. Slaughter, General Adnan, and Colonel Mustafa. It was Slaughter's final on-screen appearance as an Iraqi sympathizer, a storyline fueled by the Gulf War.

Among the other on-screen highlights of the event was the Legion of Doom (Animal and Hawk) defeating The Nasty Boys (Brian Knobbs and Jerry Sags) to win the WWF Tag Team Championship. The team became the only tag team in wrestling history to have held the WWF Tag Team Championship, the NWA World Tag Team Championship, and the AWA World Tag Team Championship. Another highlight was The Mountie spending the night in jail after losing to Big Boss Man in a jailhouse match.

== Background ==
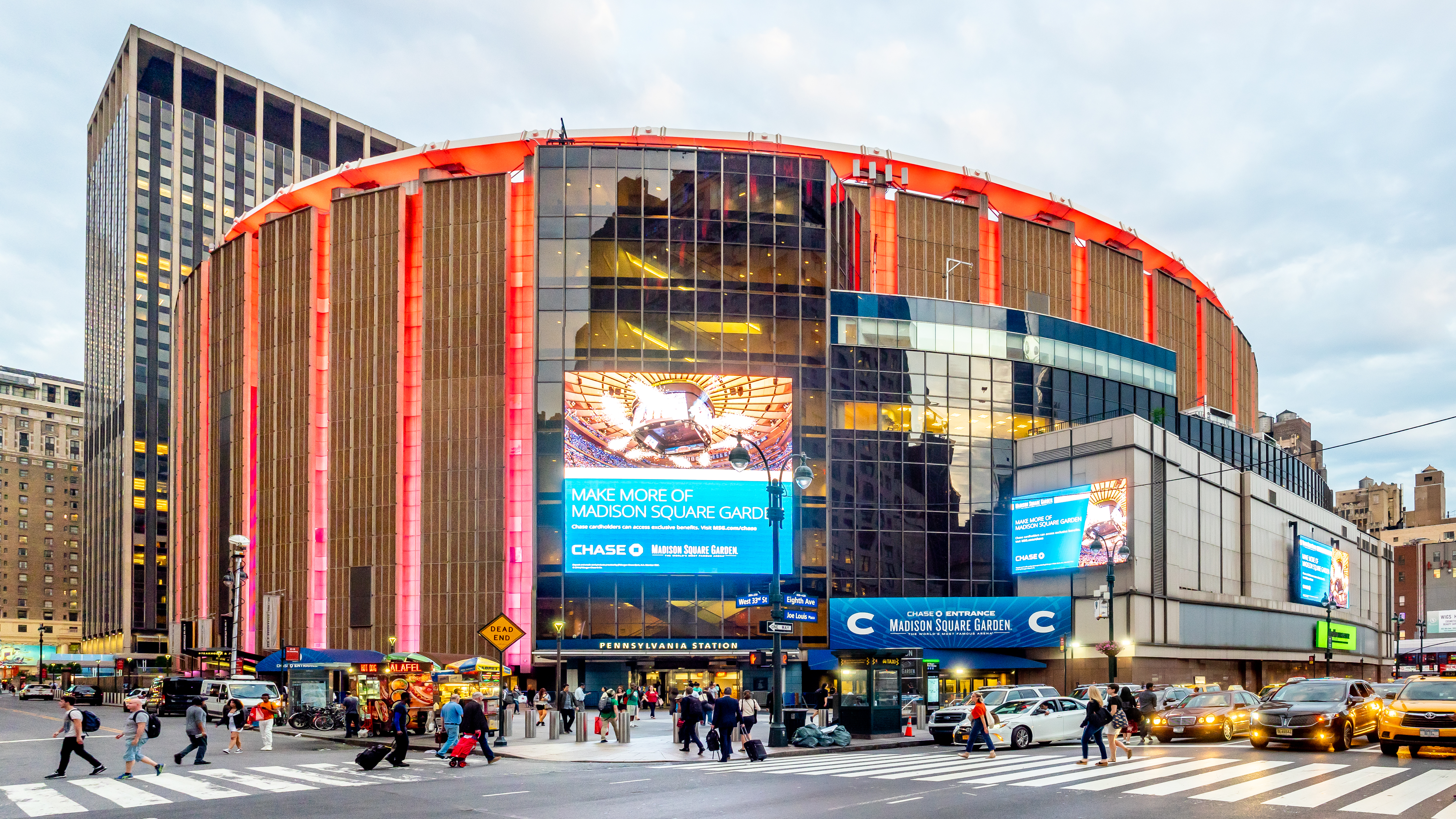
This fourth annual SummerSlam was the second time for the event to be held at Madison Square Garden in the New York City borough of Manhattan, New York, after the inaugural 1988 event.

SummerSlam is an annual professional wrestling pay-per-view (PPV) event produced every August by the World Wrestling Federation (WWF, renamed WWE in 2002) since 1988. Dubbed "The Biggest Party of the Summer", it is one of the promotion's original four PPVs, along with WrestleMania, Royal Rumble, and Survivor Series, referred to as the "Big Four". It has since become considered the WWF's second biggest event of the year behind WrestleMania. The fourth SummerSlam was scheduled to be held on Monday, August 26, 1991, from Madison Square Garden (MSG) in the New York City borough of Manhattan, New York, marking the second SummerSlam at MSG, after the inaugural 1988 event.

== Reception ==
Reviewing the show for TJRwrestling, John Canton gave the show a mixed review of 5 out of 10. He heaped praise upon the Intercontinental Championship match, describing it as "fantastic" and "one of the most memorable matches in the history of both legends". However, he was fairly mixed-to-negative on many of the other matches, noting the IRS/Valentine match and the Tag Team Championship bout as "boring". He especially panned the Natural Disasters/Bushwacker match calling it as "an awful match... that would've benefited with less time." He also described the main event as "passable", despite the older age of the workers involved. He closed his review with saying it would've been a terrible show without the Intercontinental match, but believed kids would've enjoyed it due to the number of face victories.

Reviewing for 411Mania, Robert Leighty Jr. was far more positive, giving the overall show a 9 out of 10. Whilst admitting the show had "one classic match and the others were okay or not good", Leighty Jr. noted the quality came from "good moment after good moment". Like Canton, he was favourable towards the Intercontinental match, but noted it "isn't as good as remembered" despite praising Perfect's performance. He also enjoyed the Million Dollar Championship match as "super simple match in front of a hot crowd... fun stuff!". Ultimately though, panned the Natural Disasters/Bushwackers match, along with the main event, giving it 0.5 stars, calling it "not good" and stating that "This headlining a MSG house show maybe makes sense, but not here." Reviewing the show for his website Scott's Blog of Doom, wrestling reviewer Scott Keith highly recommended the show and claimed it was "a ton of fun" even though the main event "did not deliver at all".

== Aftermath ==
Highlights of the wedding reception for Randy Savage and Miss Elizabeth were aired on the WWF's syndicated and cable programs, and included The Undertaker and Jake Roberts crashing the party. Savage – who was still barred from competing as an active wrestler, per his WrestleMania VII "retirement match" loss to the Ultimate Warrior – would become the target of Roberts' insults, which continued to grow through the fall of 1991. Eventually, Savage had enough and, while doing color commentary duties on WWF Superstars, came to the ring while Roberts was delivering an anti-Savage promo, only for Roberts to severely beat Savage, tie him into the ring ropes and allow his devenomized king cobra to bite his arm. The aftermath of that incident led to Savage's reinstatement as an active wrestler and a match at the "This Tuesday in Texas" pay-per-view event.

Following his team's loss to Hogan and Ultimate Warrior, Slaughter re-evaluated his support of Iraq, acknowledged he had made a bad decision and became a face again, appearing in vignettes next to American landmarks, saying "I want my country back." During an episode of Superstars, Jim Duggan was under attack from The Nasty Boys, and Slaughter made the save. Duggan and Slaughter teamed up to defeat the Nasty Boys and continued to team over the next several months; Slaughter also defeated Colonel Mustafa and General Adnan in a series of matches. Despite Slaughter's face turn, he was still named 1991's "Most Hated Wrestler of the Year" by Pro Wrestling Illustrated magazine for his pro-Iraqi gimmick.

SummerSlam 1991 marked André the Giant's last United States pay-per-view appearance in his lifetime. By now using crutches to get around due to his continuing health problems with acromegaly, André would make several appearances during the WWF's tour of England in September and October 1991. These were his last appearances in the WWF during his lifetime, as he died on January 27, 1993. Also dealing with injuries was Mr. Perfect, who would take a three-month-long absence from the WWF to recuperate; he would return to WWF television as a heel-favoring color commentator on Superstars. He would not return to in ring competition again until the 1992 Survivor Series.

Rick "The Dragon" Steamboat left the WWF before Survivor Series 1991 to return to WCW. Steamboat had been rumored to be "squashed" by The Undertaker to get him ready for his WWF World Title run against Hulk Hogan. Ted DiBiase would finish up his feud with his former manservant Virgil (and regain his Million-Dollar Belt in the process), quietly remove Sensational Sherri as his valet (who would move to be Shawn Michaels' valet), then team up with Irwin R. Schyster (IRS) to form Money Inc in early 1992. The Nasty Boys would move on into a feud with the Bushwhackers and the Rockers, which would be settled at Survivor Series. Power and Glory would split after the events of SummerSlam; Paul Roma departed WWF in October 1991, took some time off, then moved to WCW and joined the Four Horsemen (instead of Tully Blanchard, who was offered but refused due to low pay) in 1993, and Hercules would also move to WCW in early 1992 and become "The Super Invader" before heading to Japan the following year.

Jim Neidhart would team up with Owen Hart to form "New Foundation" and would remain a tag team until Neidhart left the WWF in early 1992. Meanwhile, The Mountie would begin targeting Bret Hart for the Intercontinental Championship, eventually winning the title shortly before the 1992 Royal Rumble and The Big Boss Man went on to feud with Irwin R. Schyster.

=== Ultimate Warrior controversy ===
Off-screen, there was an incident involving The Ultimate Warrior and Vince McMahon at this event. One month before the pay-per-view, Warrior wrote a letter to McMahon threatening to no-show the main event tag team match unless paid $550,000 that he claimed was owed to him from his work at WrestleMania VII. In 2005, it was revealed by Hulk Hogan and Sgt. Slaughter that dealing with the matter physically for Vince McMahon was a possibility when they became aware of Warrior's threat.

McMahon, who did not want Hogan and Slaughter to get into a physical altercation with Warrior, paid Warrior the money, and then fired him immediately following SummerSlam. Warrior later responded on his website to these allegations by stating he was owed money stemming from work performed at WrestleMania VII and that he was actually suspended by McMahon immediately after the show, but quit the WWF out of protest. McMahon would later state that while he couldn't make a last-minute change in the card due to the fans expecting the match, he "could not wait to fire him" after the pay-per-view, which according to Jake Roberts, he did- right after Warrior came through the curtain after the match. As a result Warrior was not present for the in-ring celebration with Hogan and Sid Justice following the match. In the aftermath, Warrior's anticipated feud with Jake Roberts – who, in another storyline that aired a few weeks earlier, had turned heel after tricking Warrior into believing he would aid him in his feud with The Undertaker – was canceled, and the Roberts-Savage feud was conceived instead. Roberts revealed in an interview that he was so furious with Warrior (because of the loss of money he could have made and the title run he was guaranteed with one of the company's biggest stars at the time), that he carried hostile feelings towards Warrior for many years.

== Home media and streaming ==
The event was released on VHS in late 1991 by Coliseum Video in the United States and in July 1992 by Silver Vision in the United Kingdom. The home video includes the post-event wedding reception in which Jake Roberts attacks Randy Savage and Miss Elizabeth. There is also a pre-event interview with Savage that was not originally broadcast.

In May 2005, it was re-released on DVD in the United Kingdom as part of Silver Vision's Tagged Classics range, and was paired with SummerSlam 1990. This DVD set was not released in the USA.

In 2014, the event was included on the WWE's streaming platform the WWE Network as part of its launch and remained on the service until the platform closed in 2026. In July 2025, WWE uploaded the event to stream freely on their WWE Vault YouTube channel.

== Results ==
No.	Results	Stipulations	Times
1^{D}	Koko B. Ware defeated Kato	Singles match	6:03
2	The Dragon, The British Bulldog, and The Texas Tornado defeated The Warlord and Power and Glory (Paul Roma and Hercules) (with Slick)	Six-man tag team match	10:43
3	Bret Hart defeated Mr. Perfect (c) (with The Coach) by submission	Singles match for the WWF Intercontinental Championship	18:03
4	The Natural Disasters (Earthquake and Typhoon) (with Jimmy Hart) defeated The Bushwhackers (Luke and Butch) (with André the Giant)	Tag team match	6:27
5	Virgil defeated Ted DiBiase (c) (with Sensational Sherri) via Pinfall	Singles match for the Million Dollar Championship	13:11
6	Big Boss Man defeated The Mountie (with Jimmy Hart)	Jailhouse match	9:38
7	The Legion of Doom (Hawk and Animal) defeated The Nasty Boys (Brian Knobbs and Jerry Sags) (c) (with Jimmy Hart)	Street Fight for the WWF Tag Team Championship	7:45
8	Irwin R. Schyster defeated Greg Valentine	Singles match	7:07
9	Hulk Hogan and Ultimate Warrior defeated the Triangle of Terror (Sgt. Slaughter, General Adnan, and Col. Mustafa)	2-on-3 Handicap match Sid Justice was the special guest referee.	12:40
(c) / – the champion(s) heading into the match; D / – this was a dark match

== Other on-screen personnel ==
Commentators

- Gorilla Monsoon
- Bobby Heenan
- Roddy Piper

Interviewers

- Lord Alfred Hayes
- Sean Mooney
- Gene Okerlund

Ring Announcer

- Howard Finkel

Referees

- Danny Davis
- Earl Hebner
- Joey Marella
- Sid Justice

other

- Tony Garea
- Rene Goulet
- Pat Patterson
