= WrestleMania VIII =

1992 World Wrestling Federation pay-per-view event

- Promotional poster featuring Sid Justice, Hulk Hogan, Randy Savage, and Ric Flair.
- Promotion: World Wrestling Federation
- Date: April 5, 1992
- City: Indianapolis, Indiana
- Venue: Hoosier Dome
- Attendance: 62,167
- Tagline(s): Friendship Torn Apart! The Macho/Flair Affair!

Pay-per-view chronology
← Previous; Royal Rumble	Next → SummerSlam

WrestleMania chronology
← Previous; VII	Next → IX

WrestleMania VIII was a 1992 professional wrestling pay-per-view (PPV) event produced by the World Wrestling Federation (WWF, renamed WWE in 2002). It was the eighth annual WrestleMania and took place on April 5, 1992, at the Hoosier Dome in Indianapolis, Indiana.

Nine matches were shown during the live broadcast, with one dark match occurring before the event. Featured matches included WWF Intercontinental Champion Roddy Piper defending his title against former champion Bret Hart, WWF Champion Ric Flair defending his title against Randy Savage, and Hulk Hogan facing Sid Justice.

== Production ==
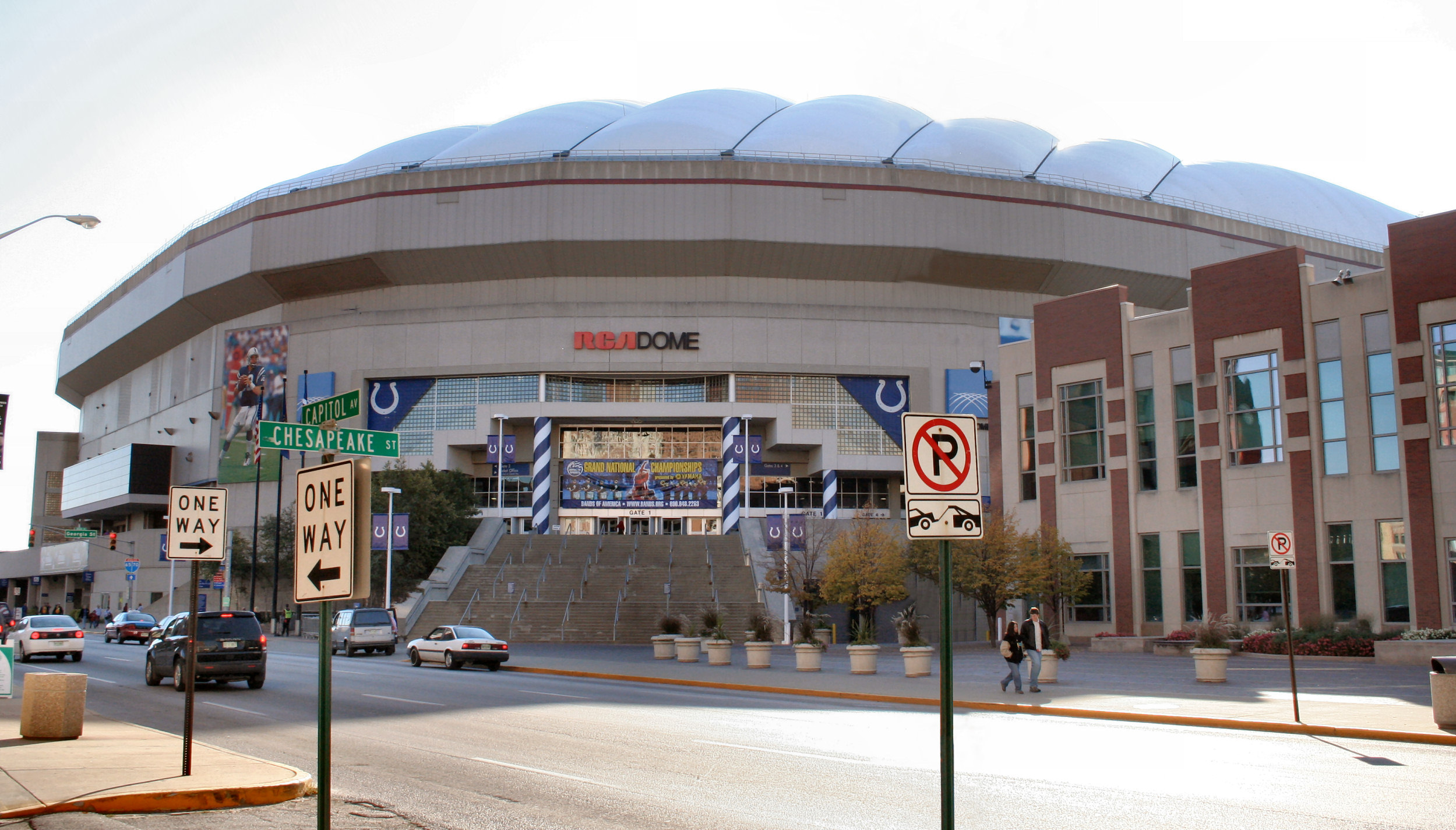
The eighth annual WrestleMania was held in Indianapolis, Indiana at the Hoosier Dome (pictured as RCA Dome, renamed in 1994).

=== Background ===
WrestleMania is considered the World Wrestling Federation's (WWF, renamed WWE in 2002) flagship professional wrestling pay-per-view (PPV) event, having first been held in 1985. It is held annually between mid-March to mid-April. It was the first of the WWF's original four PPVs, which includes Royal Rumble, SummerSlam, and Survivor Series, referred to as the "Big Four". WrestleMania VIII was scheduled to be held on April 5, 1992, at the Hoosier Dome in Indianapolis, Indiana.

=== Storylines ===
The original plan for the main event was the long-awaited bout between Ric Flair and Hulk Hogan for the WWF Championship, the meeting between the two legends was even promoted on television in a mock press conference where WWF President Jack Tunney had announced Hogan as the number one contender to Flair's WWF Championship. Both Flair and Hogan had wrestled against each other in several house show matches and a televised tag match, but not in a televised main event singles match. WrestleMania VIII was changed to a double main event with Hogan wrestling Sid Justice, while Flair wrestled Randy Savage. For storyline purposes, Sid Justice lobbied to wrestle Hulk Hogan due to tensions starting between the two at that year's Royal Rumble, where Hogan was eliminated by Sid Justice. This maneuver on Sid's part led Hogan to helping rival Ric Flair eliminate Justice and then win not only the Royal Rumble match but the WWF Championship in the process. This would make Ric Flair only the second man to win both the WWF and NWA World Heavyweight Championship, the first being the original "Nature Boy", Buddy Rogers.

== Event ==
Other on-screen personnel
Role:	Name:
Commentator	Gorilla Monsoon
Commentator	Bobby Heenan
Interviewer	Lord Alfred Hayes
Interviewer	Sean Mooney
Interviewer	Gene Okerlund
Ring announcer	Howard Finkel
Ring announcer	Harvey Wippleman (main event)
Ring announcer	Ray Combs (eight-man tag team match)
Referees	Joey Marella
Referees	Earl Hebner
Referees	Danny Davis
Referees	Roger Ruffen

A scheduled match between the British Bulldog and The Berzerker was cut due to time constraints.

The opening bout was a tag team match pitting the Beverly Brothers against the Bushwhackers. The Bushwhackers won the match by pinfall. This was a dark match that did not air on the pay-per-view broadcast.

The pay-per-view broadcast opened with country music singer Reba McEntire performing "The Star-Spangled Banner".

The second bout, and the first bout to air on the pay-per-view broadcast, was a Singles match between Shawn Michaels and Tito Santana. Michaels won the match by pinfall after reversing a body slam attempt into a body press.

Following the second bout, The Legion of Doom and their manager Paul Ellering were interviewed by Gene Okerlund. The Legion of Doom were originally supposed to challenge Money Inc for the WWF Tag Team Championship at WrestleMania VIII but due to Hawk being under suspension until after WrestleMania they were replaced in the match by the Natural Disasters.

The third bout was a singles match between Jake "The Snake" Roberts and the Undertaker. The Undertaker won the match by pinfall after giving Roberts a Tombstone Piledriver outside of the ring.

The fourth bout was a singles match in which WWF Intercontinental Champion Roddy Piper defended his title against Bret Hart. Hart defeated Piper by pinfall after reversing Piper's sleeper hold into a pin, thus winning the WWF Intercontinental Championship.

Following the fourth bout, a pre-recorded interview with Lex Luger aired in which he promoted the World Bodybuilding Federation.

The fifth bout was an eight-man tag team match pitting Big Boss Man, Jim Duggan, Sgt. Slaughter, and Virgil against The Mountie, The Nasty Boys, and Repo Man. Family Feud host Ray Combs was a guest ring announcer for the eight-man tag match. Big Boss Man, Duggan, Slaughter, and Virgil won the match by pinfall when Jerry Sags accidentally punched Brian Knobbs, enabling Virgil to pin Knobbs.

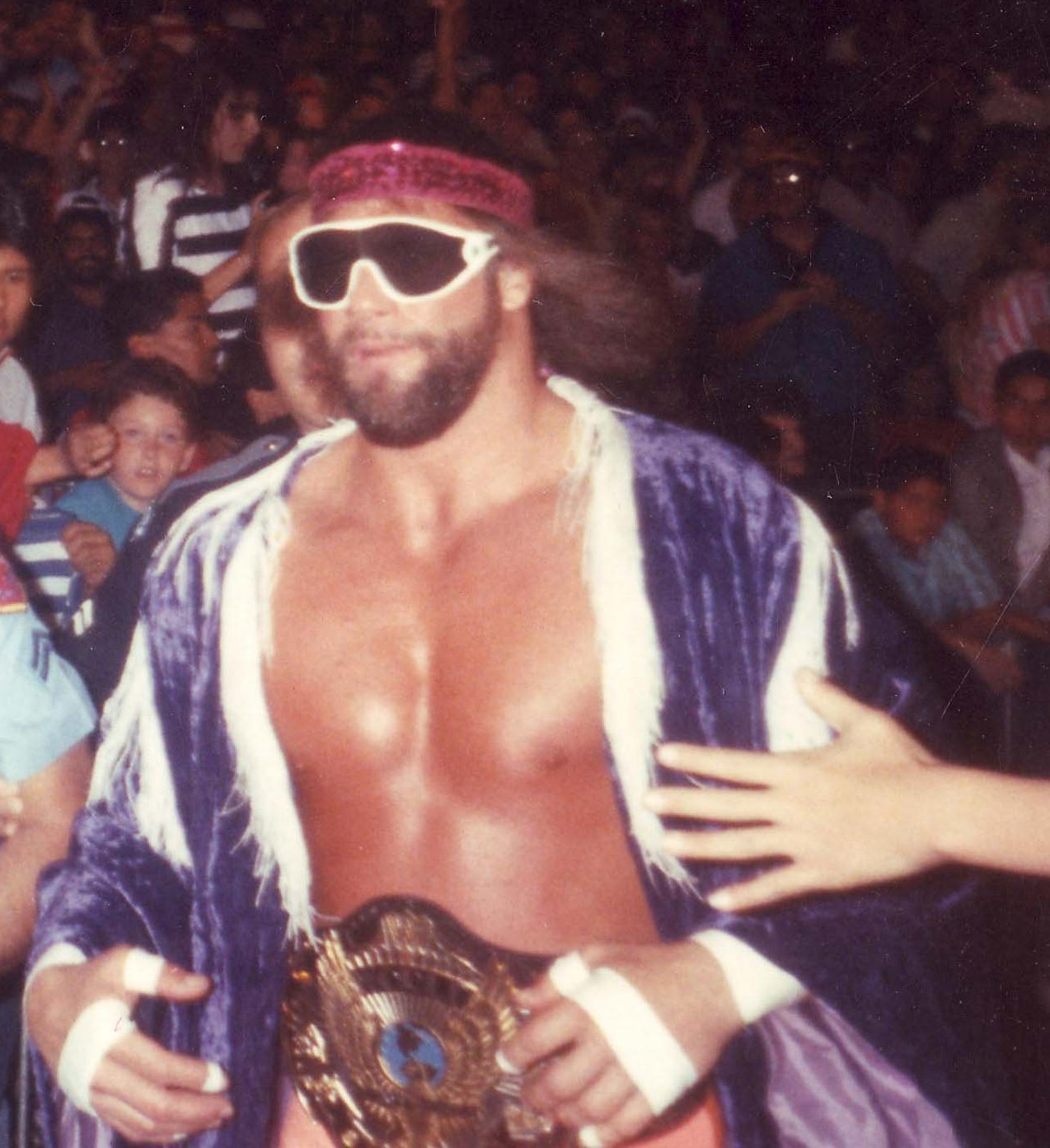
Randy Savage (shown while WWF Champion in 1989) won the WWF Championship again at WrestleMania VIII.

The sixth bout was a singles match in which WWF Champion Ric Flair defended his title against Randy Savage. Savage defeated Flair by pinfall using a roll-up to win the title. At the time the company had a "no blood" policy. Nonetheless, Ric Flair was caught blading directly on camera and was fined several thousand dollars. In one of his first appearances in the WWF, Shane McMahon was one of the backstage officials who attempted to keep Miss Elizabeth away from ringside during the Flair/Savage match. He then restrained Savage in the ensuing brawl after the contest.

The seventh bout was a singles match between Rick Martel and Tatanka. Tatanka won the match by pinfall using a cross body block.

The eighth bout was a tag team match in which WWF Tag Team Champions Money Inc. defended their titles against the Natural Disasters. The Natural Disasters won the bout by countout after Money Inc abandoned the match.

The ninth bout was a singles match between Owen Hart and Skinner. Hart won the match by pinfall using a roll-up.

The main event bout was a singles match between Hulk Hogan and Sid Justice. Hogan won the match by disqualification after Justice's manager Harvey Whippleman interfered. The finish to the Justice-Hogan match actually did not occur as planned - the original plan was for Hogan to hit the leg drop on Justice and for Papa Shango to do a run in and break up the pin causing a disqualification; however, Gorilla Monsoon was late in cuing Papa Shango to head down to the ring, causing Justice to have to improvise by kicking out of the leg drop. Following the match, Justice and Shango attacked Hogan until Ultimate Warrior made a surprise return, helping Hogan drive Justice and Shango away.

== Reception ==
Critics praised the Intercontinental Championship match between Piper and Hart. Thomas Golianopoulos of Complex Sports ranked it at number 15 in his list of the 50 Greatest Matches in WrestleMania History, describing it as "A stiff match that veers from amateur wrestling to all-out street fight with a great finish." Golianopoulos also ranked the Flair vs. Savage match at number 19 on the same list, praising the in-ring psychology despite an abrupt finish. Dave Meltzer of the Wrestling Observer Newsletter gave the Hogan/Justice main event negative two stars, citing their lackluster performance and the late entry of Papa Shango, which necessitated a hastily rewritten ending. The main event was also ranked by YouTube wrestling channel Cultaholic as the worst WrestleMania main event of all time in their 2019 ranking of every WrestleMania Main Event, while saying that the WWF Championship Match between Flair and Savage should've been the main event in their 2020 list of 10 WrestleMania Matches That Should Have Closed The Show.

== Aftermath ==
Savage's primary opponent during the spring and summer of 1992 was Ric Flair, with the storyline over Flair's alleged past relationship with Elizabeth continuing to play a major factor. It was revealed later in WWF Magazine that the photos that Flair had shown of himself with Elizabeth were fakes, and that they were actually of Savage and Elizabeth. In real life, Savage and Elizabeth were about to separate, and did, with Elizabeth making her final WWF appearance on April 19, 1992, at the UK Rampage pay-per-view. WrestleMania VIII marked Elizabeth's last major pay-per-view appearance in the United States for the WWF.

Although Savage and Flair continued feuding, the Elizabeth aspect was dropped from the storyline, and the former couple's divorce was finalized in September 1992. Savage briefly addressed the divorce in an issue of WWF Magazine, but it was otherwise not mentioned in kayfabe.

Shawn Michaels began receiving his first major push as a main-event singles competitor, as he would challenge Randy Savage for the WWF Championship in Europe, while challenging Bret Hart for the WWF Intercontinental Championship in the United States, while occasionally teaming with Ric Flair in tag team matches against Hart and Savage. Michaels eventually won the WWF Intercontinental Championship from The British Bulldog (who had won the title from Hart at the SummerSlam event in London, England in August) in October.

The Hulk Hogan-Sid Justice match was billed as Hogan's "last match", when in actuality, Hogan took a hiatus, due to the steroid scandal which was beginning to emerge in the news media. Piper also took a hiatus from the ring following WrestleMania VIII. Roberts left the company and would return four years later, using a "born-again Christian" gimmick. Sid Justice was largely unsuccessful in post-WrestleMania matches against Ultimate Warrior and The Undertaker and eventually left the company, returning in 1995.

== Home media and streaming ==
The event was released on VHS by Coliseum Video in the United States and by Silver Vision in the United Kingdom. The home video cut of the event included backstage interviews that weren't originally broadcast. The tape also includes an apology for the cancellation of the advertised Davey Boy Smith and Berzerker match. In the US, mail orders of the tape came with a free WWF pencil case.

It was re-released on DVD in the United Kingdom in September 2005 as part of Silver Vision's Tagged Classics range, and was paired with WrestleMania VII. This DVD set was not released in the USA.

In 2014, the event was included on the WWE's streaming platform the WWE Network as part of its launch and remained on the service until the platform closed in 2026. In April 2026, WWE uploaded the event to stream freely on their WWE Vault YouTube channel.

== Results ==
Times based on video playback
No.	Results	Stipulations	Times
1^{D}	The Bushwhackers (Bushwhacker Butch and Bushwhacker Luke) defeated the Beverly Brothers (Beau Beverly and Blake Beverly) (with The Genius)	Tag team match	10:00
2	Shawn Michaels (with Sensational Sherri) defeated Tito Santana	Singles match	10:38
3	The Undertaker (with Paul Bearer) defeated Jake "The Snake" Roberts	Singles match	6:36
4	Bret Hart defeated Roddy Piper (c)	Singles match for the WWF Intercontinental Championship	13:51
5	Big Boss Man, Virgil, Sgt. Slaughter, and Jim Duggan defeated The Mountie, The Nasty Boys (Brian Knobbs and Jerry Sags), and Repo Man (with Jimmy Hart)	Eight-man tag team match	6:33
6	Randy Savage (with Miss Elizabeth) defeated Ric Flair (c) (with Mr. Perfect)	Singles match for the WWF Championship	18:04
7	Tatanka defeated Rick Martel	Singles match	4:33
8	The Natural Disasters (Earthquake and Typhoon) defeated Money Inc. (Ted DiBiase and Irwin R. Schyster) (c) (with Jimmy Hart) by countout	Tag team match for the WWF Tag Team Championship	8:38
9	Owen Hart defeated Skinner	Singles match	1:36
10	Hulk Hogan defeated Sid Justice (with Harvey Wippleman) by disqualification	Singles match	12:28
(c) / – the champion(s) heading into the match; D / – this was a dark match
