= Royal Rumble (1992) =

World Wrestling Federation pay-per-view event

- Promotional poster by Joe Jusko, featuring various WWF wrestlers
- Promotion: World Wrestling Federation
- Date: January 19, 1992
- City: Albany, New York
- Venue: Knickerbocker Arena
- Attendance: 17,000
- Tagline: Every Man for Himself!

Pay-per-view chronology
← Previous; This Tuesday in Texas	Next → WrestleMania VIII

Royal Rumble chronology
← Previous; 1991	Next → 1993

The 1992 Royal Rumble was a professional wrestling pay-per-view (PPV) event produced by the World Wrestling Federation (WWF, renamed WWE in 2002). It was the fifth annual Royal Rumble event and took place on January 19, 1992, at the Knickerbocker Arena in Albany, New York. It centered on the men's Royal Rumble match, a modified 30-man battle royal in which the participants enter at timed intervals instead of all beginning in the ring at the same time.

Six matches were contested at the event, including one dark match. The main event was the 1992 Royal Rumble match. This televised Royal Rumble match was notable as for the first time, there was a prize for winning, which was the WWF Championship that had been vacated in December 1991. Ric Flair last eliminated Sid Justice to win the Royal Rumble match and the vacant WWF Championship. In other featured matches on the undercard, The Natural Disasters (Earthquake and Typhoon) defeated The Legion of Doom (Hawk and Animal) by countout, The Beverly Brothers (Blake Beverly and Beau Beverly) defeated The Bushwhackers (Bushwhacker Luke and Bushwhacker Butch), and Roddy Piper defeated The Mountie to win the WWF Intercontinental Heavyweight Championship.

== Production ==
=== Background ===
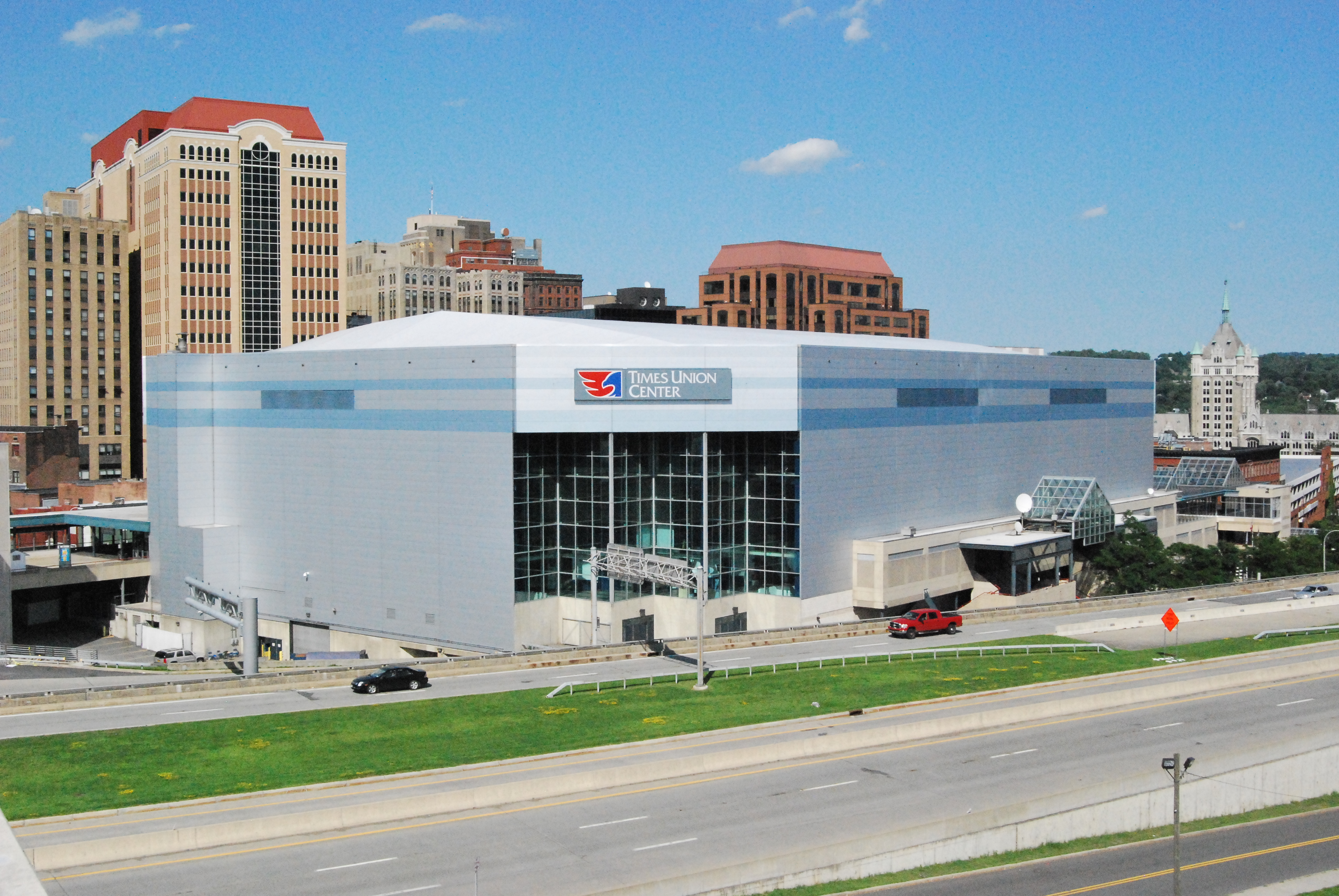
The fifth annual Royal Rumble event was held in Albany, New York at the Knickerbocker Arena (pictured in 2011 after it had since been renamed as the Times Union Center).

The Royal Rumble is an annual professional wrestling event, produced every January by the World Wrestling Federation (WWF, renamed WWE in 2002) since 1988; that first event was a television special before it became an annual pay-per-view (PPV) beginning in 1989. It is one of the promotion's original four PPVs, along with WrestleMania, SummerSlam, and Survivor Series, referred to as the "Big Four". It is named after and centered on the men's Royal Rumble match. The fifth Royal Rumble event was scheduled to be held on January 19, 1992, at the Knickerbocker Arena in Albany, New York.

The Royal Rumble match is a modified battle royal in which the participants enter at timed intervals instead of all beginning in the ring at the same time and it generally features 30 wrestlers. Not including the non-televised test match in 1987, prior to 1992, there was no prize for winning the match. However, as the WWF Championship had been vacated in December 1991, the vacant title became the prize of the 1992 Royal Rumble match, marking the first televised Royal Rumble with a prize.

=== Storylines ===
Prior to the event, it was announced the winner of the Royal Rumble would win the vacant WWF World Heavyweight Championship, which had been stripped from Hulk Hogan after two controversial title switches between Hogan and The Undertaker, first at the 1991 Survivor Series and then just six days later at This Tuesday in Texas. Hogan and Undertaker were among the 30 entrants in the Royal Rumble match at the event. WWF president Jack Tunney gave Hogan and Undertaker an advantage in the random draw to determine the order in which wrestlers would enter the ring, promising them numbers between 20 and 30.

== Event ==
Other on-screen personnel:
Role:	Name:
Commentator	Gorilla Monsoon
Commentator	Bobby Heenan
Interviewers	Gene Okerlund
Interviewers	Sean Mooney
Interviewers	Lord Alfred Hayes
Ring announcer	Howard Finkel
Referee	Fred Sparta
Referee	Danny Davis
Referee	Earl Hebner
Referee	Joey Marella

The event comprised five matches, including the Royal Rumble match. The Royal Rumble match helped begin Justice's slow-building turn into a villain. Justice – who was returning from a recent injury – entered at No. 29 and was among the final four wrestlers, along with Hogan, Randy Savage, although he jumped outside the ring to hit Jake the Snake Roberts and Flair. Justice eliminated Savage and then Hogan, leaving himself and Flair in the ring. During the initial live pay-per-view broadcast, Justice's elimination of Hogan was loudly cheered by the audience in attendance even though, as per storyline plans, Sid "sneaked up from behind" to throw Hogan out. As such, the original reaction was edited out of future television replays of the event, with play-by-play announcer Gorilla Monsoon adding new comments condemning Sid for his actions (Monsoon had originally said Justice's elimination of Hogan was fair). Hogan, who was still at ringside after being eliminated, grabbed Sid's arm and distracted him long enough for Flair to eliminate him to win the match and become the new WWF World Heavyweight Champion. After the match, Sid and Hogan got into an argument in the ring and had to be separated by security.

In his book, To Be The Man, Ric Flair mentions not knowing he was going to be winning the Royal Rumble (WWF Title) until arriving at the arena the day of the event, and also felt he was brought in at number three in order to showcase his skills and endurance to the WWF audience, who may not have watched his work in Jim Crockett Promotions and World Championship Wrestling. Bobby Heenan mentioned in his autobiography, Bobby The Brain, that it was his initial suggestion that Flair enter the Rumble at number one for dramatic purposes, and that Vince McMahon changed it to number three and claimed it as his own idea.

== Reception ==
The Rumble match is often considered the greatest Rumble in history. In particular, the commentary by Heenan was particularly praised, with some calling it "one of the greatest color commentary performances in pay-per-view history".

== Aftermath ==
The confrontation between Hogan and Justice was played out over a series of future WWF television programs. On the Superstars program aired January 25, 1992, WWF President Jack Tunney held a press conference, where he announced that Hogan would face Flair for the WWF World Heavyweight Championship at WrestleMania VIII. Justice, who was also in attendance and began standing up as if Tunney were about to proclaim him the top contender, was outraged and termed the announcement "the most bogus act Jack Tunney has ever pulled off." Sid later apologized and Hogan accepted, but on the February 8 Saturday Night's Main Event XXX, Justice abandoned Hogan during a tag-team match against Flair and The Undertaker, completing his heel turn and leading to a match at WrestleMania VIII.

Flair, meanwhile, began feuding with Savage over the WWF World Heavyweight Championship. According to the storyline, Flair claimed that he had a previous relationship with Savage's wife, Miss Elizabeth, going as far as presenting pictures of Elizabeth in which Flair had himself superimposed. This culminated in a title match at WrestleMania VIII; Savage won the match and his second (and final) WWF World Heavyweight Championship.

This was the first Royal Rumble in which stakes were involved for the winner—the stipulation in which the winner would face the world champion at WrestleMania first took place at the following year's event. It would be 24 years before the Royal Rumble match was again for the championship, which had since been renamed as the WWE World Heavyweight Championship, although at that 2016 event, the reigning champion defended the title in the Royal Rumble match, entering at number one.

== Home media and streaming ==
The event was released on VHS by Coliseum Video in the United States and by Silver Vision in the United Kingdom. The home video was edited so as the crowd booing Hulk Hogan was less audible. The tape also includes a number of previously unbroadcast locker room interviews.

In September 1991, it was re-released on DVD in the United Kingdom as part of Silver Vision's Tagged Classics range, and was paired with Royal Rumble 1991. This DVD set was not released in the USA.

In 2014, the event was included on the WWE's streaming platform the WWE Network as part of its launch and remained on the service until the platform closed. In January 2021, WWE uploaded the Royal Rumbl match to stream freely on their YouTube channel.

As of October 2026, subscribers in multiple territories, including the US, Canada and the UK, can stream the event on Netflix, thanks to the WWE's ten-year agreement with the company.

== Results ==
No.	Results	Stipulations	Times
1^{D}	Chris Walker defeated The Brooklyn Brawler by disqualification	Singles match	—
2	The New Foundation (Jim Neidhart and Owen Hart) defeated The Orient Express (Kato and Pat Tanaka) (with Mr. Fuji)	Tag team match	17:19
3	Roddy Piper defeated The Mountie (c) (with Jimmy Hart) by submission	Singles match for the WWF Intercontinental Championship	5:21
4	The Beverly Brothers (Beau and Blake) (with The Genius) defeated The Bushwhackers (Luke and Butch) (with Jamison)	Tag team match	14:57
5	The Natural Disasters (Earthquake and Typhoon) (with Jimmy Hart) defeated The Legion of Doom (Hawk and Animal) (c) by countout	Tag team match for the WWF Tag Team Championship	9:24
6	Ric Flair won by last eliminating Sid Justice	30-man Royal Rumble match for the vacant WWF Championship	1:02:02
(c) / – the champion(s) heading into the match; D / – this was a dark match

=== Royal Rumble entrances and eliminations ===
A new entrant came out approximately every 2 minutes.

Draw	Entrant	Order	Eliminated by	Times	Eliminations
1	The British Bulldog	7	Ric Flair	23:33	3
2	Ted DiBiase	1	The British Bulldog	01:18	0
3	Ric Flair	-	Winner	01:00:02	5
4	Jerry Sags	2	The British Bulldog	01:06	0
5	Haku	3	The British Bulldog	01:51	0
6	Shawn Michaels	10	Tito Santana	15:46	1
7	Tito Santana	9	Shawn Michaels	13:55	1
8	The Barbarian	11	Hercules	12:55	0
9	The Texas Tornado	8	Ric Flair	09:20	0
10	Repo Man	6	Big Boss Man	06:23	2
11	Greg Valentine	5	Repo Man	04:12	0
12	Nikolai Volkoff	4	Repo Man	01:03	0
13	Big Boss Man	13	Ric Flair	03:38	2
14	Hercules	12	Big Boss Man	00:56	1
15	Roddy Piper	26	Sid Justice	34:06	1
16	Jake Roberts	15	Randy Savage	10:55	0
17	Jim Duggan	19	Virgil	20:45	1
18	Irwin R. Schyster	23	Roddy Piper	27:01	0
19	Jimmy Snuka	14	The Undertaker	02:27	0
20	The Undertaker	17	Hulk Hogan	13:51	1
21	Randy Savage	27	Ric Flair and Sid Justice	22:26	2
22	The Berzerker	18	Hulk Hogan	09:00	0
23	Virgil	20	Jim Duggan	07:29	1
24	Col. Mustafa	16	Randy Savage	02:36	0
25	Rick Martel	25	Sid Justice	12:39	1
26	Hulk Hogan	28	Sid Justice	11:29	3
27	Skinner	21	Rick Martel	02:13	0
28	Sgt. Slaughter	22	Sid Justice	04:37	0
29	Sid Justice	29	Ric Flair	05:55	6
30	The Warlord	24	Hulk Hogan and Sid Justice	01:43	0

Randy Savage eliminated himself shortly by jumping over the top rope to chase Jake Roberts. Savage was brought back into the ring by The Undertaker because Savage's scripted elimination was to take place later in the match. Announcers Gorilla Monsoon and Bobby Heenan originally thought that Savage was officially eliminated but then they realized that Savage wasn't thrown out by another wrestler to be eliminated.

Ric Flair broke the longevity record for lasting 1:00:02. This record would stand for one year before it would be broken by Bob Backlund (Lasting 1:01:10) in Royal Rumble (1993). Ric Flair also became the first person in history to last more than one hour.
