= Jack Tunney =

Canadian wrestling promoter (1935–2004)

- Born: John Tunney Jr. January 21, 1935; Toronto, Ontario, Canada
- Died: January 24, 2004 (aged 69); Waterdown, Ontario, Canada
- Relatives: Frank Tunney (uncle)

John Tunney Jr. (January 21, 1935 – January 24, 2004) was a Canadian professional wrestling promoter and personality. He was best known internationally for serving as the kayfabe president of the World Wrestling Federation (WWF) during the company's Golden Era, the peak days of "Hulkamania". In real life, Tunney was the head of Toronto-based Maple Leaf Wrestling, and served as President of WWF's Canadian branch Titan Sports Canada.

== Early life ==
In 1930, Jack Corcoran set up Toronto's Queensbury Athletic Club (QAC, later known by the unofficial name of Maple Leaf Wrestling), along with Jack's father, John Tunney Sr., his uncle, Frank Tunney, and Toots Mondt.

== Professional wrestling career ==
=== World Wrestling Federation (1984–1995) ===
In the summer of 1984 (in part to present Canadian fans with a familiar face as the WWF tried to expand northward) the WWF named Tunney its new figurehead "president" (a similar role to that of current WWE general managers) on the company's television programs, replacing Hisashi Shinma. Tunney filled this role for over a decade (while the '80s "Hulkamania" boom was at its peak). His on-air decisions were portrayed as legitimate in storylines.

As the on-screen President, Tunney "oversaw" many key moments and some of his major television appearances included:

- 1986 – Suspending André the Giant from competition after he failed to show for a series of matches. The last being a match in which Andre was supposed to team with Hillbilly Jim against Big John Studd and King Kong Bundy. Bobby "the Brain" Heenan was upset and asked Tunney to suspend him, which he did. Heenan later claimed that Andre was competing as the masked "Giant Machine" and was told by Tunney that if Andre was proven to be one of The Machines, Andre would be suspended for life. (The angle regarding Andre's absence was to give Andre some much needed time off, due to a tour of Japan and to tend to health problems he was starting to experience, as well as filming The Princess Bride).
- On "Piper's Pit", reading proclamations and giving trophies to Hulk Hogan and André the Giant (for being WWF Heavyweight Champion for three years and attaining a 15-year undefeated streak, respectively). In one of these he unveiled a new Heavyweight Belt, which was said to be long enough for Andre's waist, as requested by his new manager Bobby Heenan. These appearances were part of an angle foreshadowing Andre's heel turn and set up the main event match at WrestleMania III as Hogan's trophy was reportedly bigger than Andre's.
- January 26, 1987 – Suspending referee Danny Davis "for life plus ten years" after officiating a match where Davis allowed The Hart Foundation to use illegal double-team maneuvers before defeating the British Bulldogs for the WWF Tag Team Championship. He had already officiated a series of controversial matches where he favored the heels for which Tunney had forced an apology from Davis, which included the line "...even though I don't mean it".
- Later in 1987, in response to the kidnapping of The British Bulldogs canine mascot Matilda, indefinitely suspending The Islanders until Matilda was found. The Islanders, as part of an angle, kidnapped Matilda during a match to heat up their feud.
- February 5, 1988, during another Hulk Hogan versus Andre The Giant match. Dave Hebner was supposed to be the referee, but it turned out that Ted DiBiase had paid off Dave's twin brother, Earl, to screw Hogan out of the Title. At one point, Andre had Hogan pinned and, although Hogan had a shoulder up, a three count was recorded anyway. Dave came to the ring and argued with his brother. Andre ended up handing the belt to DiBiase.
- Several times, Tunney's presence was known even off-camera. One such example was, as part of an angle involving the Andre-Hogan match aired on The Main Event I. As the Superstars of Wrestling program that aired February 6, 1988, was produced prior to the airing of The Main Event (where Andre's title win was booked to take place), a side storyline was contrived to have Tunney place a "gag order" on announcers and commentators from discussing the events surrounding the Andre-Hogan match. Heel color commentator Jesse "the Body" Ventura attempted to bring up the subject several times but was censored each time, upsetting him so much that he left the broadcast booth toward the end of the show.
- Stripping "The Million Dollar Man" Ted DiBiase of the WWF Heavyweight Championship after acquiring the title from new champion André the Giant in exchange for a huge financial payoff. Tunney, who also refused to return the title to Hogan by voiding Andre's controversial pinfall win, declared the championship vacant and announced a 14-man tournament to compete for the held-up championship at WrestleMania IV. The WWF Heavyweight Championship tournament was eventually won by "Macho Man" Randy Savage, who defeated DiBiase in the final round.
- 1988 – Tunney was rarely involved in physical confrontations with wrestlers. One exception was when Bad News Brown confronted Tunney on the set of "The Brother Love Show" and demanded a WWF title shot against then-champion Savage. When Brown began implying that Tunney and Savage's manager Miss Elizabeth were involved in an affair (suggesting that Miss Elizabeth was "doing favors" for Tunney to protect Savage from sure defeat), Tunney began scolding Brown for making such a claim, poking his finger in his chest to assert his authority. Brown then grabbed Tunney by his necktie and warned him never to touch him again.
- 1989 – Jack Tunney banned "Rugged" Ronnie Garvin from refereeing. Garvin was portraying a referee after losing a retirement match to Greg Valentine, but during matches, he would fight with the wrestlers who would not listen to his orders. Despite warnings by Tunney, Garvin punched Valentine during his match against Jimmy Snuka, which led to him being banned from refereeing.
- 1990 – He reversed The Rockers' shock tag title win at an Indiana house show to justify WWF writers ignoring the switch on TV.
- February 10, 1990 – Jack Tunney officially announced the main event of WrestleMania VI. On February 24, Tunney announced "The Ultimate Challenge" where both the WWF Championship (Hulk Hogan) and Intercontinental Championship (Ultimate Warrior) would be on the line for the first-time ever during the match.
- April 1, 1990 – The peak of Tunney's WWF reign was WrestleMania VI at Toronto's SkyDome. The first WrestleMania held outside of the U.S., the show drew over 67,000. In the main event The Ultimate Warrior (The Intercontinental champion) cleanly pinned Hulk Hogan to win the WWF World Title, and Tunney announced on television there would be no rematch.
- April 15, 1990, on Wrestling Challenge – Jack Tunney announces that the Intercontinental title is vacant since one man cannot defend both titles. Tunney then sets up a tournament for the title.
- 1990 – Restricting Demolition to two active members following the 1990 Survivor Series. (This action was announced to explain the departure of Bill Eadie, who performed as the "third" Demolition member Ax, from the WWF).
- Late 1990 – Suspending Rick Rude for making some crude remarks about the Big Boss Man's mother for several weeks, culminating in four minutes of "Boss Man's Mama" jokes. Finally, Tunney had had enough and fired him. In reality, the suspension explained Rude's departure from the WWF over a dispute.
- February 1991 – Tunney named Hulk Hogan as the number one contender for the WWF Heavyweight Title. This marks the first time the winner of the Royal Rumble is awarded a WWF Heavyweight title match at a Wrestlemania. Hogan would go on to defeat Sergeant Slaughter to win the WWF Heavyweight Title for a third time at Wrestlemania VII.
- Fall of 1991 – Distorting the "Real World" title belt of Ric Flair in televised promos when he began performing for the WWF.
- 1991 – Tunney became embroiled in a feud between the retired Randy "Macho Man" Savage (As a result of his loss to the Ultimate Warrior at Wrestlemania VII) and Jake "the Snake" Roberts. Jake ruined the wedding party of the Macho Man and Miss Elizabeth after SummerSlam 1991. Macho Man petitioned to be reinstated and the public wanted to see Savage get revenge on Roberts, but Tunney released a statement saying that he was taking the matter "under advisement". Savage nearly got involved in Survivor Series, but in the midst of a scuffle in the ring, Roberts allowed a venomous king cobra to bite the arm of Randy Savage while Savage was restrained in the ropes. Tunney announced that because of the snake bite, Savage wouldn't be able to participate in the Survivor Series. Tunney then decides to reinstate Savage as a full-time wrestler, but Tunney however punishes Roberts from permanently allowing any snakes at ringside and Roberts is also punished from participating in the Survivor Series because of his actions and that The Legion of Doom and Big Boss Man would wrestle The Natural Disasters and Irwin R. Schyster in a 6 man elimination match. Savage would defeat Roberts at This Tuesday in Texas and Tunney escorted Roberts from ringside, following the post-match beatdown of Savage and slapping Miss Elizabeth's face.
- On December 3, 1991 – At Tuesday in Texas, Tunney watched the Hulk Hogan-Undertaker heavyweight title match from ringside to ensure a "fair match" with no outside interference. Toward the end of the match, Ric Flair came down and got into an argument with Tunney who was watching the match from ringside. Hogan grabbed a chair and hit Flair in the back with it. Flair fell into Tunney and they both went down. Hogan used the ashes from the Undertaker's urn to blind the Undertaker and rolled him up to win back the WWF Heavyweight Title. In the aftermath, Tunney stripped Hogan of the title and declared that the championship would be filled by the winner of the 1992 Royal Rumble.
- January 19, 1992 – At the "Royal Rumble", WWF President Jack Tunney gave Hogan and Undertaker an advantage in the random draw to determine the order in which wrestlers would enter the ring, promising them numbers between 20 and 30. Ric Flair entered at number three and lasted over an hour to become champion. During the show, Bobby Heenan called him "Jack On the take Tunney".
- January 25, 1992 – On the Superstars program following the Royal Rumble, Tunney held a press conference, where he announced that Hogan the No.1 contender, meaning that he would face Flair for the WWF Championship at WrestleMania VIII. Sid Justice, who was also in attendance and began standing up as if Tunney were about to proclaim him the top contender, was outraged and termed the announcement "the most bogus act Jack Tunney has ever pulled off."
- May 1, 1993 – Tunney granted Bret Hart entry into the 1993 King of the Ring tournament without requiring him to win a qualifying match. This was consolation for a result of Hart's controversial loss to Yokozuna at Wrestlemania IX.
- In September 1993 – Jack Tunney announced that he was stripping Shawn Michaels of the WWF Intercontinental Championship for not defending the title often enough. There have been reports that in reality, he had been suspended for testing positive for steroids (a charge he never admitted) and that Michaels refused to drop the belt. Michaels left the WWF for around a month.
- In the buildup to Summerslam 1993 – Tunney ruled that Lex Luger couldn't use his forearm in his match against Yokozuna unless he wore a protective pad. The point of contention was a steel plate inside Luger's arm, which opponents claimed was a weapon used to increase the force of his forearm smash finisher; Tunney said the plate was part of Luger's body. At the event, Luger won by countout when he used his forearm to knock Yokozuna out of the ring, and Yokozuna couldn't answer the 10 count. As a result, Yokozuna retained the WWF Heavyweight Title.
- Summerslam 1993 – Tunney came to the ring and had Howard Finkel announce that Jerry Lawler would be given a lifetime ban if he refused to compete in his scheduled match with Bret Hart. Lawler, however, appeared on crutches, but in his wrestling gear, and claimed that he had been injured in a car accident. He announced that his court jester, Doink the Clown (portrayed by Matt Osborne), would wrestle Hart in his place.
- In the summer of 1994, he forced Lawler to apologize to Duke Droese for "demonstrating such a brutal amount of violence".
- January 22, 1994 – Before the Royal Rumble match began, commentator Vince McMahon announced that WWF President Jack Tunney had shortened the interval between entrances from the traditional two minutes to 90 seconds due to time constraints. One of his final major appearances came in the aftermath of the Royal Rumble — both Bret "the Hitman" Hart and Luger simultaneously eliminated each other, and two debating referees failed to agree on a winner — Tunney declared Bret Hart and Luger co-winners of the 1994 Royal Rumble after it could not be determined whose feet hit the floor first. Modifying a stipulation of the Royal Rumble match's outcome, both men would be granted separate matches against WWF Heavyweight Champion Yokozuna for the title at WrestleMania X.
- January 23, 1994 – On the WWF Monday Night Raw aired after the Royal Rumble, Tunney declared that a coin toss using a double-sided coin would determine whether Luger or Hart would get to first wrestle WWF Heavyweight Champion Yokozuna at WrestleMania X for the title. A championship match at WrestleMania was awarded to the Royal Rumble match winner. Luger won the coin toss and the right to face Yokozuna first.
- June 16, 1994 – Made a brief live appearance for the coronation ceremony of the 1994 King of the Ring, Owen Hart. Owen gives Tunney the brush-off so that Neidhart could crown him.

Unlike later authority figures in wrestling, Tunney only appeared on screen when a major decision was needed, which made his announcements seem important. Tunney's on screen character was neutral rather than the later heel authority figures. However, Tunney's decisions often upset the leading face characters, such as Hulk Hogan. Unlike during the WWF's "Attitude Era", when wrestlers such as Stone Cold Steve Austin regularly attacked authority figures, even heel wrestlers rarely got physical with Tunney.

==== Departure ====
In the 1990s, Tunney's appearances on television and live events grew less frequent. On the July 10, 1995 airing of Monday Night Raw, Vince McMahon on commentary mentioned that Tunney had retired on Independence Day 1995. On July 12, 1995, due to financial struggles, McMahon chose to close its Toronto office and run the shows in Toronto without any involvement from Tunney's Toronto office (Billy "Red" Lyons was also gone since he helped Tunney run the office). Tunney was forced out of the WWF, retired and disappeared from the wrestling scene. Following Tunney's departure, Gorilla Monsoon was given the role of on-screen WWF President. Tunney never returned to pro wrestling and this was the end of the Tunney line of Toronto wrestling promoters.

On September 17, 1995, the final WWF show was held at the Gardens and the 64-year affiliation of pro wrestling and Maple Leaf Gardens ended, since Tunney took with him the exclusive rights to wrestling at the Maple Leaf Gardens. Wrestling would return to Toronto on August 24, 1996, with a WWF show held outdoors at Exhibition Stadium drawing 21,211 fans. In 1997 the WWF, still unable to run shows at Maple Leaf Gardens, held a Monday Night Raw taping on January 31, 1997, at the SkyDome. Maple Leaf Gardens closed entirely in 1999, and the WWF returned to regular arena shows at the Air Canada Centre, which opened that fall.

== Death ==
On January 24, 2004, at the age of 69, Tunney died of a heart attack in his sleep at his home in Waterdown, Ontario, after a sudden illness. Frank Zicarelli wrote in the Toronto Sun "He was a very kind and gracious man who did a lot for charities, too".

Tunney's firing from the WWF was never resolved. Following his death, no representatives from the WWF/E were reported to be present at his funeral, and his death was not announced on WWE.com. However, he is still fondly remembered by WWF/E fans for his numerous appearances with the company and the memorable, iconic moments he was involved in during his spell as WWF President.
