= WrestleMania VII =

1991 World Wrestling Federation pay-per-view event

- Promotional poster featuring Sgt. Slaughter and Hulk Hogan
- Promotion: World Wrestling Federation
- Date: March 24, 1991
- City: Los Angeles, California
- Venue: Los Angeles Memorial Sports Arena
- Attendance: 16,158
- Tagline: Super-Stars and Stripes Forever!

Pay-per-view chronology
| ← Previous; Royal Rumble | Next → SummerSlam |

WrestleMania chronology
| ← Previous; VI | Next → VIII |

WrestleMania VII was a 1991 professional wrestling pay-per-view (PPV) event produced by the World Wrestling Federation (WWF, renamed WWE in 2002). It was the seventh annual WrestleMania and took place on March 24, 1991, at the Los Angeles Memorial Sports Arena in Los Angeles, California. The event was originally planned for the Los Angeles Memorial Coliseum, but reportedly due to security concerns and low ticket sales, it was moved to the adjacent Sports Arena, which made it the second WrestleMania held at the venue after the final portion of WrestleMania 2 in 1986.

Fourteen matches were shown during the live broadcast, with one dark match held before the event. The main event saw Hulk Hogan defeat Sgt. Slaughter for the WWF Championship as part of a storyline in which Sgt. Slaughter portrayed an Iraqi sympathizer during the United States's involvement in the Gulf War. Significant events on the undercard included The Undertaker's WrestleMania debut and the beginning of his renowned winning streak, a retirement match between Randy Savage and Ultimate Warrior leading to Savage's reunion with estranged lover Miss Elizabeth, as well as the final televised match of the original Hart Foundation, after which, Bret Hart became primarily a singles wrestler.

== Production ==
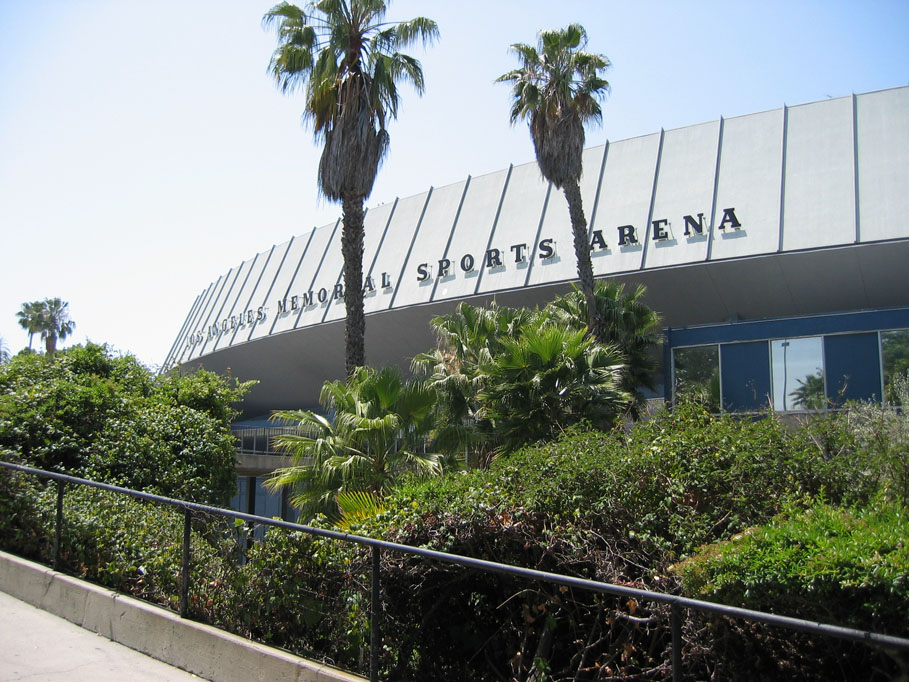
The seventh annual WrestleMania was originally planned to be held at the Los Angeles Memorial Coliseum (top) in Los Angeles, California, but was moved to the adjacent Los Angeles Memorial Sports Arena (bottom), which made it the second WrestleMania at the venue, after the final portion of WrestleMania 2 in 1986.

=== Background ===
WrestleMania is considered the World Wrestling Federation's (WWF, renamed WWE in 2002) flagship professional wrestling pay-per-view (PPV) event, having first been held in 1985. It is held annually between mid-March to mid-April. It was the first of the WWF's original four PPVs, which includes Royal Rumble, SummerSlam, and Survivor Series, referred to as the "Big Four". WrestleMania VII was scheduled to be held on March 24, 1991, in Los Angeles, California. It was originally planned for the Los Angeles Memorial Coliseum, but it was instead moved to the adjacent Los Angeles Memorial Sports Arena, which subsequently made it the second WrestleMania to be held at the venue, after the final portion of WrestleMania 2 in 1986.

The WWF's stated reason for the venue change was that it had security concerns in the wake of Sgt. Slaughter's portrayal of an Iraqi sympathizer during the Gulf War. This was dismissed by outlets such as SLAM! Sports of Canada, which chalked up the venue change to poor advanced ticket sales, and the company having difficulty filling the estimated 100,000 seats available. According to former WWF executive Bruce Prichard, both were accurate statements. In his Something to Wrestle With podcast, Prichard said that even if the WWF had sold out the Coliseum, the scope of the event was too large for police to ensure its security. Prichard explained further in an interview with Kayfabe Commentaries that the WWF would have had to foot the entire bill for the amount of security necessary to keep the wrestlers and fans safe from all potential issues, citing both the possibility of an outside attack and the crime rate of the surrounding neighborhood. Dave Meltzer in the Wrestling Observer Newsletter wrote that between 11,900 and 15,000 tickets were sold before the move. He also reported that no tickets had to be refunded, indicating that sales were under 15,500. Comp tickets were believed to help fill the show's crowd.

The tagline for the event was "Superstars and Stripes Forever," and is remembered for its theme of American patriotism in the wake of the Gulf War. American flags were hung all over the arena and the ring apron and banners were colored red, white, and blue, which was the basis for the main event between Hulk Hogan and Sgt. Slaughter for the WWF Championship.

This was the first WrestleMania not to feature Jesse "The Body" Ventura as a color commentator. Gorilla Monsoon hosted the event with Bobby Heenan. When Heenan had to manage at ringside in the opening match and again during Mr. Perfect's Intercontinental Heavyweight Championship defense, Monsoon was joined on the commentary by Jim Duggan and "Lord" Alfred Hayes respectively. In addition, Regis Philbin helped with commentary on the main event while Jeopardy! host Alex Trebek served as the ring announcer.

Willie Nelson sang a rendition of "America the Beautiful" before the show. Other celebrity guests in attendance for WrestleMania VII included Philbin, Trebek, and Marla Maples as backstage announcers. George Steinbrenner, Paul Maguire, Macaulay Culkin, Donald Trump, Lou Ferrigno, Chuck Norris, Beverly D'Angelo and Henry Winkler appeared as spectators. Bob Costas was scheduled to make an appearance, but he canceled weeks before the event due to his objection to the main event angle.

The artist for the promotional poster is renowned illustrative painter Joe Jusko known mainly for his work within the comic book industry.

Randy Savage required surgery on a broken thumb in late January before the event. The injury required him to miss several matches leading up to WrestleMania.

=== Storylines ===
The two main feuds entering WrestleMania in 1991 were between Hulk Hogan and WWF Champion Sgt. Slaughter and Ultimate Warrior and "Macho King" Randy Savage, and in a way, both were intertwined.

Warrior had defeated Hogan for the WWF Championship at WrestleMania a year earlier and entered 1991 as the champion. In the meantime, Sgt. Slaughter had returned to the WWF near the end of 1990 after spending five years wrestling in the American Wrestling Association. When he returned, Slaughter announced that he had turned his back on his country and had become an Iraqi sympathizer and follower of Saddam Hussein. He had also revealed an alliance with an Iraqi military leader, General Adnan, who became his advisor (Adnan having followed Slaughter from the AWA to participate in the angle). This coincided with the increasing tension in the Middle East that was going on at that time, which eventually would lead to Operation Desert Storm and American involvement in the conflict. Slaughter would eventually set his sights on Warrior, and the two agreed to a match at the Royal Rumble in January 1991.

Savage, meanwhile, was trying to regain the WWF Championship that he had lost at WrestleMania V to Hogan and challenged Warrior repeatedly to give him a shot. Warrior defeated Savage to successfully defend the title numerous times and subsequently refused to grant any more title shots, so Savage decided to seek another remedy. During the match between Warrior and Slaughter, Savage and his manager Queen Sherri came to ringside and got involved in the match. Warrior picked up an interfering Sherri and tossed her from the ring onto Savage. Slaughter capitalized by driving Warrior down, leaving him hanging over the second rope. Savage then struck Warrior with his royal scepter as Slaughter kept the referee's attention, knocking the champion unconscious. Slaughter then hit an elbow drop on Warrior and pinned him to become the new champion. After he came to and realized what Savage had done, Warrior charged to the back looking for Savage. He then issued a challenge for a retirement match for the two at WrestleMania, which Savage accepted.

Hogan, having no connection with the ongoing story to this point, entered the Royal Rumble match as its defending champion. He won the match by eliminating his old rival Earthquake last, then went backstage to be interviewed by Gene Okerlund. During the course of the interview, the word was relayed to the two that Slaughter and Adnan were celebrating their triumph by defacing an American flag. Hogan then promised to stand up for his country and take the title from Slaughter as soon as possible, and was later named the leading contender for the WWF Championship, which he had not contended for since losing the title to Ultimate Warrior at WrestleMania VI.

Leading up to the show, Hogan continued to cite the ongoing real-life war in their feud. On one episode of WWF Prime Time Wrestling, Hogan stated that Iraq would surrender in the war at the moment he defeated Slaughter.

== Event ==
Other on-screen personnel
| Role: | Name: |
|---|---|
| Commentator | Gorilla Monsoon |
| Commentator | Bobby Heenan |
| Commentator | Jim Duggan (The Barbarian and Haku vs. the Rockers) |
| Commentator | Lord Alfred Hayes (Big Boss Man vs. Mr. Perfect) |
| Commentator | Regis Philbin (Hulk Hogan vs. Sgt. Slaughter) |
| Interviewer | Gene Okerlund |
| Interviewer | Sean Mooney |
| Interviewer | Regis Philbin |
| Interviewer | Alex Trebek |
| Interviewer | Marla Maples |
| Ring announcer | Howard Finkel |
| Ring announcer | Alex Trebek (Hulk Hogan vs. Sgt. Slaughter) |
| Referees | Joey Marella |
| Referees | Earl Hebner |
| Referees | Dave Hebner |
| Referees | Danny Davis |
| Referees | Mike Chioda |
| Special Guest Timekeeper | Marla Maples (Main Event) |

The opening bout was a singles match pitting the Brooklyn Brawler against Koko B. Ware. Ware defeated the Brooklyn Brawler by pinfall. This was a dark match that did not air on the pay-per-view broadcast.

The pay-per-view broadcast began with a performance of "America the Beautiful" by Willie Nelson.

The second bout, and the first bout to air on the pay-per-view broadcast, was a tag team match pitting the Barbarian and Haku against the Rockers. In the end, Shawn Michaels hit Haku with a flying bodypress and pinned him for the three count.

After that, Dino Bravo and the Texas Tornado faced off in the ring. In the end, The Texas Tornado won the bout by pinfall following a discus punch.

Next, the British Bulldog took on the Warlord. In the end, The British Bulldog performed a running powerslam on Warlord to win the match.

After that, the WWF Tag Team Champions were on the line with the Hart Foundation defended their titles against the Nasty Boys. In the end, Jerry Sags struck Jim Neidhart with a motorcycle helmet, enabling Brian Knobbs to pin him, earning The Nasty Boys their first tag team championship in WWF.

Next, Jake Roberts and Rick Martel competed in a blindfold match. In the end, Roberts struck Martel with a DDT and pinned him, winning the match.

After that, Jimmy Snuka faced off against The Undertaker. Although Snuka attempted to bring Undertaker off his feet, he was unable too. In the end, Snuka attempted a Springboard crossbody maneuver on Undertaker but Undertaker caught him and hit Snuka with Tombstone Piledriver for the victory. This marked the beginning of the Undertaker's streak.

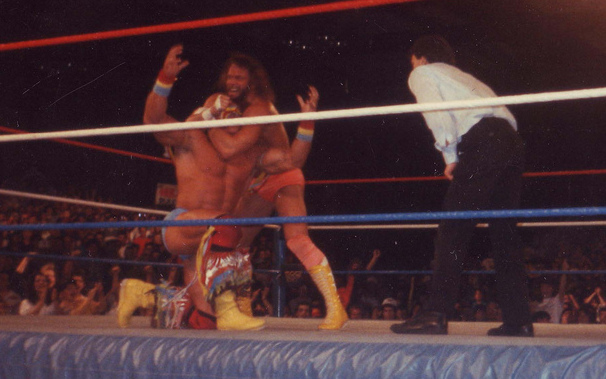
Ultimate Warrior (left) versus Randy Savage (center) in a March 7, 1989 Superstars of Wrestling event. Savage would win this match but Ultimate Warrior would go on to defeat Savage in WrestleMania VII's "retirement match".

Next, was the retirement match between Randy Savage and Ultimate Warrior. Before both men came out, Bobby Heenan spotted Savage's former valet Miss Elizabeth in the crowd. Savage and Queen Sherri came to the ring carried on a throne and Warrior walked out instead of his trademark running. The match started slow, both men initially insisted on chain wrestling until Savage started using strikes on Warrior. Savage went to the top rope and attempted a crossbody on Warrior but he caught him but put Savage on his feet and slapped him. Savage retreated from the ring and grabbed a chair at ringside and threw it at Warrior but it missed. Savage snuck back into the ring after being distracted by the referee picking up the chair and attacked Warrior. Warrior Irish whipped Savage into the corner and attempted a splash but Savage got out of the way and Warrior fell to the outside. Sherri picked up Warrior and struck his throat when the referee was not looking and Savage performed a diving axe handle from the top turnbuckle to outside the ring. Savage got back into the ring but Sherri picked up Warrior again and began hitting him but Warrior pushed her over. Savage then came out of the ring and attacked Warrior from behind. Eventually, Warrior got back in the ring and Savage hit Warrior with a body slam for a two count. After a brief back and forth, Savage attempted to wear Warrior down with a sleeper hold but Warrior got out of it and ran on the ropes but both men collided with each other in the center of the ring. Savage got Warrior up but Warrior countered with a small package but Sherri distracted the referee and when the referee turned around he counted but Savage kicked out at two. Warrior began arguing with the referee and Savage took advantage by delivering a running knee lift which propelled Warrior into the referee, taking him out. Savage then held Warrior in place and Sherri took her shoe off so she could hit Warrior with it. She climbed to the top turnbuckle and attempted an axe handle with the shoe but Warrior got out of the way and she struck Savage with it instead. Warrior chased Sherri around ringside until Savage intervened and rolled up Warrior for a two count. Savage performed a stun gun on Warrior and performed a clothesline to the back of the head. After body slamming Warrior, Savage climbed to the top rope and performed five diving elbow drops on Warrior and pinned him but Warrior kicked out. Warrior then got a surge of energy and fought back against Savage and delivered a gorilla press slam and splash to the back and pinned him but Savage kicked out at two. Warrior then began talking to his hands and asking his gods if he should step aside and lose the match and questioning whether his destiny is to lose to Savage. Warrior stepped out of the ring to give Savage a count out win after apparently receiving an answer from above. Before Warrior could do that though, Savage attacked him while he was on the apron. Savage then attempted an axe handle to the outside but Warrior moved out the way and Savage hit the barricade instead. Warrior got Savage in the ring and performed three shoulder tackles on Savage and pinned him for the three count.

After winning, Warrior put on his entrance coat and celebrated in the ring before leaving. After he had left, Sherri berated Savage who was still lying on the ring canvas trying to recover from his match. Sherri began attacking Savage in the ring but Elizabeth hopped over the barricade and got into the ring and grabbed Sherri and threw her to the outside. Elizabeth began crying and both Savage and Elizabeth embraced in the ring. The two then left the ring.

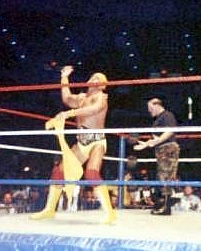
Hulk Hogan (left) defeated Sgt. Slaughter (right) to win the WWF Championship.

After that, Demolition took on Genichiro Tenryu and Kōji Kitao. In the end, Tenryu performed a powerbomb on Smash and stacked him up for the win.

Next, was a singles match between WWF Intercontinental Champion Mr. Perfect against Big Boss Man with Perfect's title on the line. Andre the Giant appeared, and coming to the ring to support the Big Boss Man and neutralizing Bobby Heenan. In the end, Big Boss Man was attacked by The Barbarian and Haku causing a disqualification victory for Big Boss Man.

After that, Earthquake and Greg Valentine faced off and Earthquake took an advantage early on and performed an Earthquake Splash for the three count.

Next, Legion of Doom took on Power and Glory. In the end, The Legion of Doom performed a Doomsday Device on Paul Roma and Animal pinned him for the victory.

After that, was a match between Ted DiBiase and Virgil. In the end, Roddy Piper came out and distracted DiBiase. When Virgil threw DiBiase to the outside Piper continued distracting him and was unable to enter the ring thus Virgil won by countout.

In the penultimate match, The Mountie faced off against Tito Santana. In the end, Jimmy Hart distracted the referee and The Mountie zapped Santana with his cattle prod and pinned him for a quick victory.

In the main event the reigning WWF Champion Sgt. Slaughter defended his title against Hulk Hogan. The match featured an appearance from Marla Maples, who would subsequently become the second wife of Donald Trump and mother of Tiffany Trump, acting as a guest timekeeper. Slaughter entered with General Adnan who was waving the Flag of Iraq. Hogan entered waving the Flag of the United States to a thunderous ovation. Both men started the match circling one another. They began chain wrestling and Slaughter pinned Hogan in the corner and the referee had to separate them. Slaughter once again pinned Hogan in the corner but Hogan shoved Slaughter who was sent to the other side of the ring. Hogan then knocked down Slaughter who retreated to the outside. Hogan went to the outside to get Slaughter but Adnan hit him from behind but Hogan was not fazed and began chasing Adnan and Slaughter hit Hogan in the back with a steel chair but Hogan still was not fazed. Hogan grabbed Slaughter and sent him into the ring. Slaughter begged for mercy and then poked Hogan in the eye. Slaughter then began wearing down Hogan. Hogan then knocked Slaughter down and Adnan got on the apron to taunt Hogan but Hogan hit him which sent him down on the floor. Hogan then took control and began beating Slaughter. Hogan then went to the top rope but Adnan grabbed Hogan's foot and Slaughter grabbed Hogan and threw him into the middle of the ring. Slaughter then clotheslined Hogan out of the ring and began hitting him with a steel chair. Slaughter then grabbed some television cables and began choking Hogan with them. Slaughter took Hogan inside the ring and delivered a backbreaker for a two count. Slaughter began arguing with the referee and continued to beat Hogan and then put him in a Boston Crab submission. Hogan grabbed the ropes to break the hold but Slaughter thought he had won but the referee told him he had not. Slaughter began giving knees to Hogan's back and went to the top rope and delivered a foot stomp to Hogan's back and pinned him but Adnan accidentally distracted the referee. When the referee turned around and began counting Hogan kicked out at two. Slaughter went to the outside and grabbed a steel chair. Hogan, who was leaning on the ropes facing the outside was hit in the side by Slaughter with the steel chair. Slaughter then pinned Hogan but Hogan kicked out at two. Slaughter then began hitting Hogan in the head, causing him to bleed. Hogan attempted a comeback but was not able to. Slaughter then put Hogan in the Camel clutch but would release the hold to stomp a few times on Hogan's back, only to put the hold on again. Hogan got up while Slaughter still had the hold applied and attempted to ram Slaughter into the turnbuckle but Slaughter released the hold and shoved Hogan into the turnbuckle. Slaughter then asked Adnan for the flag of Iraq and Adnan handed him it. Slaughter then placed the flag of Iraq on Hogan and pinned him but Hogan kicked out at two and Hogan grabbed the flag and tore it in front of Slaughter. Hogan then hulked up and even though Slaughter began hitting him, his punches had no effect. Hogan then Irish whipped Slaughter off the ropes and delivered a big boot. Hogan then performed a leg drop on Slaughter for the three count and thus became a record three-time WWF Champion. Hogan then waved the Flag of the United States and celebrated in the ring.

== Reception ==
The official attendance of WrestleMania VII held at the Los Angeles Memorial Sports Arena was 16,158. Journalist Dave Meltzer reported that the paid attendance was approximately 10,500. Writing for his website Scott's Blog of Doom in November 2023, wrestling reviewer Scott Keith mildly recommended the event. Scott gave the Hogan/Slaughter main event three stars, further adding that WrestleMania VII "didn't need" some of the "filler matches" in the undercard.

== Aftermath ==
The Undertaker's victory debut at the event marked the beginning of his WrestleMania streak.

Backstage as Hogan was being interviewed on his victory over Sgt. Slaughter, Slaughter attacked Hogan by throwing a fireball in his face. Hogan quickly recovered from the attack and defended the belt primarily against Slaughter, largely in "Desert Storm" (i.e., no-disqualification) matches. He also had to deal with The Iron Sheik, who was now competing as Colonel Mustafa. Hogan and Ultimate Warrior eventually teamed up at SummerSlam 1991, defeating Slaughter, Mustafa, and their manager, General Adnan, in a two-vs.-three handicap match.

Savage returned to television in a non-wrestling role as a color commentator for the WWF's flagship syndicated program, Superstars; although a fan favorite to the crowd, much of his commentary was heel-leaning. Meanwhile, the storyline with Miss Elizabeth continued, culminating with Savage proposing to her in the ring leading to an on-air wedding at SummerSlam 1991 dubbed The Match Made in Heaven. (The wedding was kayfabe, as Savage and Elizabeth were already legally married.)

Virgil and Ted DiBiase feuded with each other until November 1991, including facing off at SummerSlam 1991 when DiBiase lost his Million Dollar Belt to Virgil. After DiBiase won his belt back in November with the help of The Repo Man (formerly Smash of Demolition), their feud ended at the This Tuesday in Texas PPV when DiBiase and Repo Man defeated Virgil and Tito Santana in a tag team match.

Genichiro Tenryu and Kōji Kitao were on loan from the Japanese promotion Super World of Sports. The WWF co-promoted several cards in Japan with the group, including two Tokyo Dome shows on March 30 and December 12, 1991. Although SWS folded in June 1992, Tenryu's follow-up promotion, WAR, co-promoted the WWF's first Japanese tour in 1994.

After WrestleMania VII, The Hart Foundation disbanded. Bret Hart and Jim Neidhart went into singles competition. Bret Hart went on to singles success, defeating Mr. Perfect for the WWF Intercontinental Heavyweight Championship at SummerSlam 1991, and later in 1992 would win the WWF Championship when he defeated Ric Flair in his father's home town of Saskatoon in Saskatchewan, Canada. Neidhart would later in 1991 form a tag team called "The New Foundation" with Hart's younger brother Owen.

This would be the final WrestleMania appearance for André the Giant. André would appear at ringside during the Intercontinental Championship match and assist the Big Boss Man in fending off the Heenan Family. He would make sporadic appearances for the rest of the year before his passing in 1993.

== Home media and streaming ==
The event was released on VHS by Coliseum Video in the United States and by Silver Vision in the United Kingdom. The home video included interviews that weren't originally broadcast on pay-per-view.

In September 2005, it was re-released on DVD in the United Kingdom as part of Silver Vision's Tagged Classics range, and was paired with WrestleMania VIII. This DVD set was not released in the USA.

In 2014, the event was included on the WWE's streaming platform the WWE Network as part of its launch and remained on the service until the platform closed in 2026. In April 2026, WWE uploaded the main event to stream freely on their WWE Vault YouTube channel.

As of October 2026, subscribers in multiple territories, including the US, Canada and the UK, can stream the event on Netflix, thanks to the WWE's ten-year agreement with the company.

== Results ==
| No. | Results | Stipulations | Times |
|---|---|---|---|
| 1^{D} | Koko B. Ware defeated The Brooklyn Brawler by pinfall | Singles match | 6:08 |
| 2 | The Rockers (Shawn Michaels and Marty Jannetty) defeated The Barbarian and Haku (with Bobby Heenan) by pinfall | Tag team match | 10:33 |
| 3 | The Texas Tornado defeated Dino Bravo (with Jimmy Hart) by pinfall | Singles match | 3:11 |
| 4 | The British Bulldog defeated The Warlord (with Slick) by pinfall | Singles match | 8:15 |
| 5 | The Nasty Boys (Jerry Sags and Brian Knobbs) (with Jimmy Hart) defeated The Hart Foundation (Bret Hart and Jim Neidhart) (c) by pinfall | Tag team match for the WWF Tag Team Championship | 12:10 |
| 6 | Jake Roberts defeated Rick Martel by pinfall | Blindfold match | 8:34 |
| 7 | The Undertaker (with Paul Bearer) defeated Jimmy Snuka by pinfall | Singles match | 4:20 |
| 8 | Ultimate Warrior defeated Randy Savage (with Queen Sherri) by pinfall | Career ending match Because Savage lost, he was forced to retire. Had Warrior lost, he would have been forced to retire. | 20:47 |
| 9 | Genichiro Tenryu and Kōji Kitao defeated Demolition (Smash and Crush) (with Mr. Fuji) by pinfall | Tag team match | 4:44 |
| 10 | Big Boss Man (with André the Giant) defeated Mr. Perfect (c) (with Bobby Heenan) by disqualification | Singles match for the WWF Intercontinental Championship | 10:46 |
| 11 | Earthquake (with Jimmy Hart) defeated Greg Valentine by pinfall | Singles match | 3:14 |
| 12 | The Legion of Doom (Hawk and Animal) defeated Power and Glory (Paul Roma and Hercules) (with Slick) by pinfall | Tag team match | 0:59 |
| 13 | Virgil (with Roddy Piper) defeated Ted DiBiase by countout | Singles match | 7:41 |
| 14 | The Mountie (with Jimmy Hart) defeated Tito Santana by pinfall | Singles match | 1:21 |
| 15 | Hulk Hogan defeated Sgt. Slaughter (c) (with General Adnan) by pinfall | Singles match for the WWF Championship | 20:26 |
(c) / – the champion(s) heading into the match; D / – this was a dark match
