= John Nord =

American professional wrestler

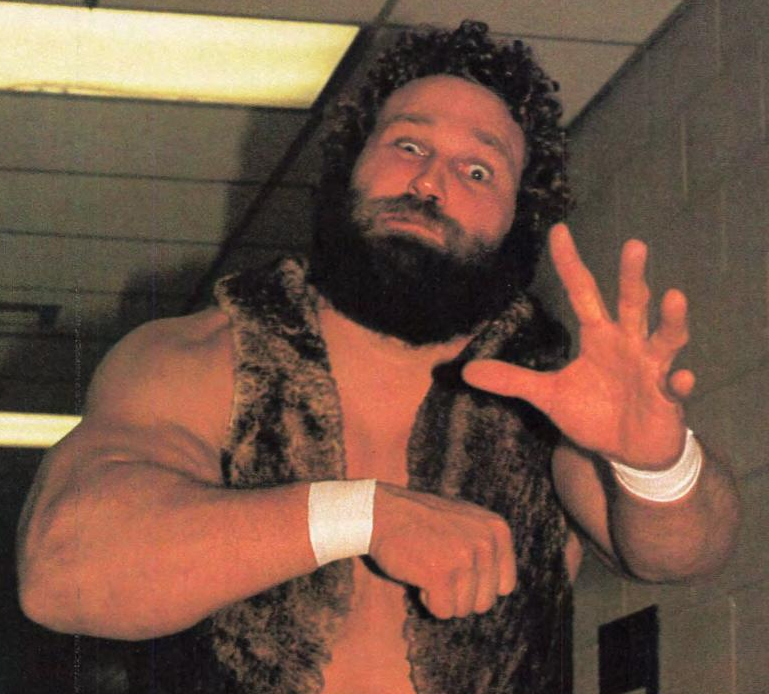
- Nord, c. 1986

Personal information
- Born: October 18, 1959 (age 66) St. Cloud, Minnesota, U.S.

Professional wrestling career
- Ring name(s): The Barbarian; The Berzerker; John Nord; Nord the Barbarian; The Viking; Yukon John
- Billed height: 6 ft 8 in (203 cm)
- Billed weight: 323 lb (147 kg)
- Billed from: "The Great North Woods" (as Yukon John); Iceland (as The Berzerker) "Parts Unknown" (as the Berzerker)
- Trained by: Eddie Sharkey
- Debut: 1984
- Retired: April 1998

John Eric Nord (born October 18, 1959) is an American retired professional wrestler. He is best known for his appearances with the American Wrestling Association and World Class Championship Wrestling in the 1980s as Nord the Barbarian and Yukon John and with the World Wrestling Federation, All Japan Pro Wrestling and World Championship Wrestling in the 1990s as The Berzerker and under his birth name.

== Professional wrestling career ==
=== Early career (1984–1985) ===
Nord was trained to wrestle by Eddie Sharkey. He debuted in late 1984 under the ring name "The Barbarian" for Mid-South Wrestling, where he was managed by Skandor Akbar. He also worked for New Japan Pro-Wrestling.

=== American Wrestling Association (1985–1987) ===
In 1985, the AWA originally promoted him as a member of the New Jersey Generals of the United States Football League.

In 1986, he became Nord the Barbarian and wrestled in singles and tag team matches (under manager Sheik Adnan El-Kaissey) in the American Wrestling Association. Here, he frequently teamed with Bruiser Brody. The two faced Greg Gagne and Jimmy Snuka as part of a triple main event at WrestleRock 86.

=== World Class Championship Wrestling (1987) ===
Nord then went to World Class Championship Wrestling in 1987. As Nord The Barbarian he was (managed by Gary Hart), where he feuded with Kevin Von Erich over the WCWA World Heavyweight Championship. He challenged Von Erich for the title at the fourth annual David Von Erich Memorial Parade of Champions at Texas Stadium in 1987. In 1988 he was inactive.

=== Return to American Wrestling Association (1989–1990) ===
In 1989, he returned to the AWA under the name Yukon John (a lumberjack gimmick where he would come to the ring with an ax, dressed in blue jeans, flannel shirt, animal skin hat and boots). He mainly competed in singles matches, until forming a tag team in 1990 with Scott Norton, called The Yukon Lumberjacks. They briefly feuded and won a series of matches with The Texas Hangmen. They challenged The Destruction Crew for the AWA World Tag Team Title, but won by countout.

=== Pacific Northwest Wrestling (1990) ===
After the American Wrestling Association closed in 1990, Nord joined Pacific Northwest Wrestling as "Nord the Barbarian". He formed a tag team with The Grappler called "The Breakfast Club". After winning matches, Nord and The Grappler would humiliate their opponents by pouring Cheerios and milk on them.

=== World Wrestling Federation (1991–1993) ===
In January 1991, Nord joined the World Wrestling Federation (WWF) as "The Viking". The following month he was renamed "The Berzerker", given Mr. Fuji as a manager, and began feuding with Davey Boy Smith and Jimmy Snuka. During his WWF run, Nord utilized a toned-down version of the gimmick of his deceased former partner Bruiser Brody in portraying a clumsy and cartoonish Icelandic Norseman. His preferred method of winning matches was by throwing his opponents over the top rope for a countout, all the while holding his wrist, licking his hand, shouting "Huss! Huss!", crossing his eyes, and falling flat on his back.

The Berzerker wrestled as part of a four-man team in an elimination match at the 1991 Survivor Series pay-per-view event. He was the last man eliminated for his team. He wrestled in the 1992 Royal Rumble for nine minutes until being eliminated by Hulk Hogan. He then feuded with The Undertaker, at one point attempting to stab him with his sword. In July 1992, he won a 40-man Battle Royal on WWF Prime Time Wrestling, and challenged Bret Hart for the WWF Championship that November.

In January 1993, the Berzerker wrestled in the 1993 Royal Rumble, being eliminated by The Undertaker. Nord's final WWF appearance was as a participant in a battle royal on the February 15, 1993 edition of Monday Night Raw.

=== Super World Sports and WAR (1992) ===
While under contract with the WWF, Nord worked for Super World of Sports in Japan in early 1992. He teamed with Kendo Nagaski.

In the fall of 1992, he worked for Japan's WAR teaming with former WWF wrestler King Haku.

=== All Japan Pro Wrestling and International (1994, 1996) ===
In 1994, Nord traveled to Japan where he competed for All Japan Pro Wrestling under his real name. There he formed a tag team with Stan Hansen. During 1995 he was inactive.

In 1996 he wrestled in Malaysia as the Viking. He lost to Rick Martel on March 5 and also lost to Dick Murdoch on March 6. Then he went to South Africa to work for All-Star Wrestling. Later that year he wrestled in the independent circuit in Texas.

=== World Championship Wrestling (1997–1998) ===
In 1997, Nord joined World Championship Wrestling (WCW) cutting off his long hair and shaving off his beard into a bleached blond haircut and a horseshoe moustache, under his real name, John Nord. Nord then formed a short-lived team with Barry Darsow in late 1997. In November 1997, he took part in the World War 3 match. He wrestled mainly on WCW Saturday Night and had a long winning streak that ended with a loss to another streak holder, Bill Goldberg, on April 7, 1998. Shortly afterwards, he retired from wrestling.

== Personal life ==
After retiring from wrestling, Nord went to work at his brother's auto dealership, Nord East Motors, in Hilltop, Minnesota.

In July 2016, Nord was named part of a class action lawsuit filed against WWE which alleged that wrestlers incurred traumatic brain injuries during their tenure and that the company concealed the risks of injury. The suit is litigated by attorney Konstantine Kyros, who has been involved in a number of other lawsuits against WWE. The lawsuit was dismissed by US District Judge Vanessa Lynne Bryant in September 2018. In September 2020, an appeal for the lawsuit dismissed by a federal appeals court.

Nord appeared on the January 24, 2018 episode of Judge Mathis where he was sued by Christine Schmidt, who he had befriended at the substance abuse facility at which she worked, for $4,759 she covered on two credit cards she had opened for him. Nord said he had been in substance abuse recovery since December 2016 and that he and the plaintiff had actually burned through a $10,000 royalty check from WWE on such things as fancy restaurant dinners. Initially, he intended to repay her with funds from another royalty check he expected, but which never materialized. She, therefore, accepted as reimbursement "205 valuable wrestling dolls" from his days in the business to sell online. Schmidt sold them for a total of $1,700. Nord claimed she would have earned much more if she sold them at their estimated value, including 5 that were allegedly worth approximately $750 each, about which he informed her when offering them as settlement. Schmidt defended the sale by claiming that she was ignorant about selling online and needed money quickly to pay bills. Mathis ruled that she should have done her due diligence before accepting and selling the dolls, and reduced the amount owed to her by the proceeds from the sale to $3,059.

On March 23, 2019, Nord was arrested on two charges, a felony for driving while intoxicated/operating a car under the influence of a controlled substance, and a gross misdemeanor for driving after his license was canceled, which he was deemed "inimical to public safety." Nord was placed on a $60,000 bond for the felony DWI charge. This was his seventh DUI arrest, and the latest of 16 incidents over the last decade in which Nord has faced either felony or misdemeanor charges.

On July 15, 2019, Hennepin County District Judge Jay Quam sentenced Nord to five years' probation on the condition that he remain in restrictive housing and refrain from "driving whatsoever." The prosecution had argued for a four-year prison term, arguing that Nord's history shows him to be a significant risk to public safety. The judge, however, in his decision, took into consideration the fact that Nord was in treatment, had been diagnosed with amyotrophic lateral sclerosis which had confined him to a wheelchair and would spend the remainder of his life in assisted-living facilities.

== Championships and accomplishments ==
- Pro Wrestling Illustrated
  - PWI Rookie of the Year (1985)
  - Ranked No. 52 of the top 500 singles wrestlers in the PWI 500 in 1992.
  - Battle Royal 1992
  - PWI ranked him 422nd of the 500 best singles wrestlers during the "PWI Years" in 2003
