= Adnan Al-Kaissie =

Iraqi professional wrestler (1939–2023)

- Al-Kaissie, c. 1985

Personal information
- Born: Adnan Bin Abdul Kareem Ahmed Alkaissy El Farthie; March 1, 1939 Baghdad, Kingdom of Iraq
- Died: September 6, 2023 (aged 84) Hopkins, Minnesota, U.S.
- Education: Oklahoma State University
- Spouse: Kathy Davis (m. 1964)
- Children: 4

Professional wrestling career
- Ring name(s): Adnan El Kaissie; Billy White Wolf; General Adnan; Shiek Adnan Al-Kaissey
- Billed height: 6 ft 0 in (183 cm)
- Billed weight: 245 lb (111 kg)
- Billed from: Baghdad, Iraq
- Trained by: Yvon Robert
- Debut: 1959
- Retired: 1998

Adnan bin Abdul Kareem Ahmed Alkaissy El Farthie (Arabic: عدنان بن عبدالكريم أحمد القيسي ألفرث; March 1, 1939 – September 6, 2023), better known professionally as Adnan Al-Kaissie, was an Iraqi-American professional wrestler and manager best known as Sheik Adnan Al-Kaissey, Billy White Wolf, or General Adnan. In 1971 he defeated André the Giant in Al-Shaab Stadium in Baghdad, under the auspices of his high school classmate, Ba'ath Party leader Saddam Hussein. He competed in the World Wide Wrestling Federation (WWWF). On December 7, 1976, he won the WWWF World Tag Team Championship with Chief Jay Strongbow.

In 1981, Adnan Al-Kaissie joined the American Wrestling Association (AWA). In 1990 he joined the World Wrestling Federation (WWF formerly WWWF, now known as the WWE), where he managed Sgt. Slaughter under the name "General Adnan". He competed at SummerSlam 1991 with his partners Sgt. Slaughter and Col. Mustafa in a Handicap match with Sid Justice as special guest referee against Hulk Hogan and Ultimate Warrior. Al-Kaissie became the first Iraqi and the first Arab to compete in a WWF/WWE ring.

== Early life ==
Adnan Al-Kaissy was born Adnan Bin Abdulkareem Ahmed Al-Kaissy El Farthie in Baghdad, Iraq. According to his autobiography, he came from a distinguished family, with his father being an imam. One of his high school classmates was Saddam Hussein. Al-Kaissy played association football and was an amateur wrestler in Iraq. He received a scholarship to play American football at the University of Houston, transferring to Oklahoma State University, emerging as a wrestler. He almost qualified for the U.S. Olympic team but was not an American citizen.

== Professional wrestling career ==
=== Early career (1959–1971) ===
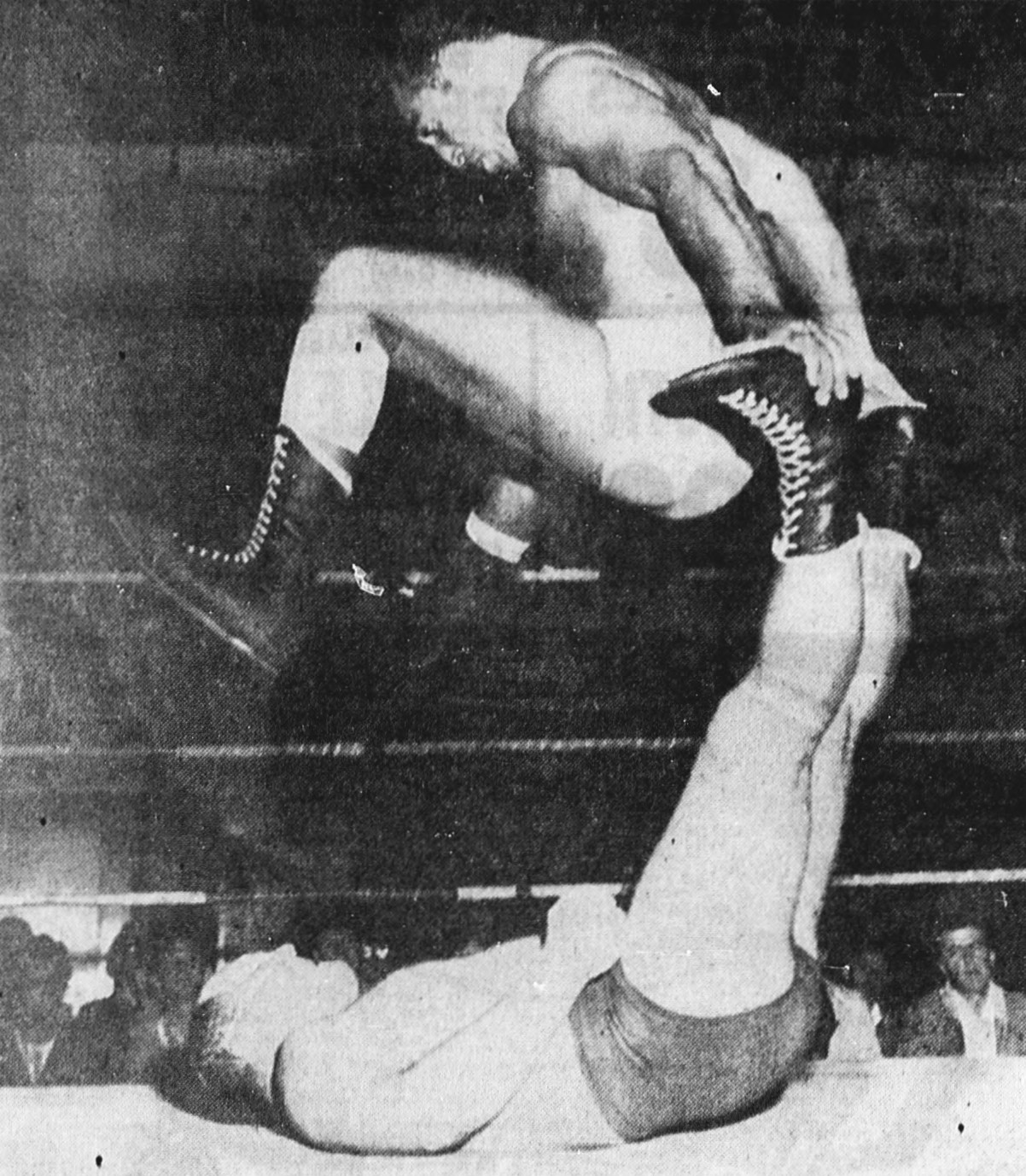
Al-Kaissie, then billed as Billy White Wolf (top), during a wrestling match against Bill Savage on 20 February 1963 in Klamath Falls, Oregon.

Al-Kaissy began wrestling in the state of Oklahoma in 1959 under the ring name Billy White Wolf, a Native American character.

Kaissey wrestled for Pacific Northwest Wrestling in the 1960s. In 1964, Adnan, who had married an American woman, became a United States citizen. He also wrestled for Joint Promotions in the United Kingdom in 1969 as White Wolf.

In 1969, he appeared in the Hawaii Five-O episode “Just Lucky, I Guess,” under his ring name, Billy Whitewolf, as the associate of a mob boss.

=== Iraqi wrestling (1971–1974) ===
During the 1970s, he took professional wrestling to Iraq under the direction of Saddam Hussein. In one such match, he defeated André the Giant in Baghdad in 1971 and he defeated the Scottish Ian Campbell, Frenchman and the Canadian champion George Gordienko in Baghdad. He also wrestled Bob Roop there in 1972. Al-Kaissy became enormously popular in his home country, being gifted palaces, a fleet of Mercedes-Benz cars, and money from the government. He began to fear for his safety after overhearing conversations from his nephews in the Republican Guard and later felt he was being used by Saddam. He left Iraq for the last time in 1980.

=== New Japan Pro-Wrestling and Florida (1974–1975) ===
In 1974, Adnan debuted in New Japan Pro-Wrestling as the Sheik of Sheiks of Baghdad, he teamed with Nikolai Volkoff and they tried to win the NWA North American Tag Team but they failed after losing the Best Two Out Of Three Falls match against Antonio Inoki and Seiji Sakaguchi at Aichi Prefectural Gymnasium in Aichi, Japan. Later he feuded with the likes of Antonio Inoki, Seiji Sakaguchi, Kantaro Hoshino, Osamu Kido, Haruka Eigen. After he left NJPW, Adnan returned to the United States, where he wrestled in Eddie Graham's promotion Championship Wrestling from Florida under his real name.

=== World Wide Wrestling Federation (1976–1977) ===
In the World Wide Wrestling Federation, in 1976, under the Native American gimmick Billy White Wolf, he won the World Tag Team Championship with Chief Jay Strongbow. Needing neck surgery, Kaissie agreed to work an injury angle where he had his neck broken by Ken Patera via the Swinging Neckbreaker on television. After he left the territory for his neck surgery in 1977, the "Indians" were stripped of the title.

=== Various promotions (1977–1981) ===
In 1978, he was presented in Hawaii as the master of the "Indian Death Match" until his arch-rival, Tor Kamata, defeated him. Changing gimmicks, he was billed as "The Sheik" in the United Kingdom in 1979. He then returned to Iraq, where his old classmate Saddam Hussein had taken power. Kaissey was popular and helped introduce professional wrestling to Iraq, but Hussein viewed him as a potential rival. Kaissey fled to the United States and never returned, though he maintained contact with his family in Baghdad.

=== American Wrestling Association (1981–1989) ===
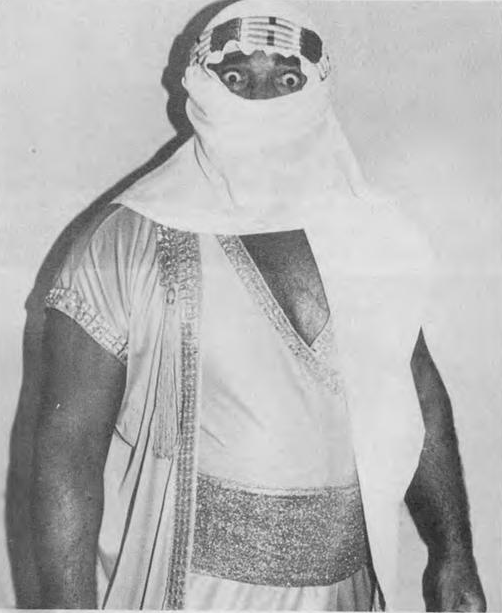
Al-Kaissie as "Sheik" Adnan El Kaissey during his time in AWA, circa 1985

In 1981, with tensions between the US and Middle East running high, he debuted in the American Wrestling Association as "Sheik Adnan El Kaissey," where his stated goal was to win the AWA title from champion Nick Bockwinkel. He failed at that task, so he then enlisted Jerry Blackwell, now wearing a sheik's outfit and renamed Sheik Ayatollah Jerry Blackwell, to team with him to try to win the AWA Tag Team Championship. That failed, too, so Adnan bought Ken Patera from manager Bobby Heenan to team with Blackwell, and Adnan would act as Blackwell and Patera's manager. The team of Blackwell and Patera captured the AWA World tag team title from Greg Gagne and Jim Brunzell. Adnan had to quit wrestling when he was injured, which is the real reason Patera was brought in to team with Blackwell. On April 23, 1983, at the AWA Super Sunday, he teamed with Blackwell in a tag team match against Verne Gagne and Mad Dog Vachon which they lost. In 1986 at AWA WrestleRock he lost to Verne Gagne in a steel cage; he then teamed with Boris Zhukov in a tag team match against The Midnight Rockers (Marty Jannetty & Shawn Michaels). Kassie later left the AWA, but returned on a November 26, 1988, card in Bloomington, Minnesota, when he managed The Iron Sheik (who he would also later manage in the WWF) in a match against Sgt. Slaughter.

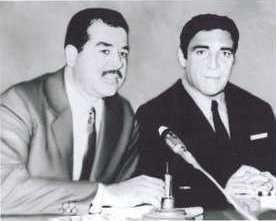
Al-Kassie with Saddam Hussein in the early 1970s

=== World Wrestling Federation (1990–1992) ===
In the World Wrestling Federation, during the summer of 1990, he allied with Sgt. Slaughter as "General Adnan," and managed him during his pro-Iraqi gimmick in a feud with Hulk Hogan and Ultimate Warrior. During this feud, Slaughter won the WWF title from the Warrior at the 1991 Royal Rumble, and lost it a couple of months later to Hogan at WrestleMania VII.

The pair were then joined by Slaughter's former nemesis, The Iron Sheik, who was repackaged as Colonel Mustafa, to form the Triangle of Terror. Adnan also headlined SummerSlam 1991 with Slaughter and Mustafa against Hogan and Warrior. During the build-up to Survivor Series 1990, the WWF showed what they claimed were "classified top secret photos released by the Pentagon/CIA" that featured General Adnan with Saddam Hussein. After Slaughter turned face, Adnan continued to manage Col. Mustafa until leaving the WWF shortly after Royal Rumble 1992.

Al-Kaissie is also featured as a playable character in the WWE 2K15 video game; in where he appears as a downloadable character as part of the "Path of the Warrior" Showcase. He was once again featured as a playable character in WWE 2K16.

=== Late career (1992–1998) ===
After WWF he then joined American Wrestling Federation (AWF) where he managed "The Rat Pack" of Bob Orton Jr, Mr. Hughes & Manny Fernandez. He also managed Hercules Hernandez.

Al-Kaissie retired from wrestling in 1998.

== Personal life and death ==
Al-Kaissie formerly ran the World All-Star Wrestling Alliance, which he co-owned with Ken Patera.

On November 22, 2006, he appeared on Fox News Channel's Hannity & Colmes describing his encounters with Saddam Hussein.

Adnan Al-Kaissie died at The Glenn Hopkins in Hopkins, Minnesota on September 6, 2023, at the age of 84.

== Autobiography ==
In 2005, Triumph Books published his memoirs as The Sheik of Baghdad: Tales of Celebrity and Terror from Pro Wrestling's General Adnan.

== Championships and accomplishments ==
- 50th State Big Time Wrestling
  - NWA United States Heavyweight Championship (Hawaii version) (1 time)
  - NWA Hawaii Tag Team Championship (1 time) – with Neff Maiava
- George Tragos/Lou Thesz Professional Wrestling Hall of Fame
  - Class of 2020
- NWA Australia
  - Australian Heavyweight Championship (1 time)
- Pacific Northwest Wrestling
  - NWA Pacific Northwest Heavyweight Championship (2 times)
  - NWA Pacific Northwest Tag Team Championship (4 times) – with Shag Thomas (1), Pepper Martin (1), Bearcat Wright (1), and Johnny War Eagle (1)
- Pro Wrestling Illustrated
  - Ranked No. 410 of the 500 best singles wrestlers during the PWI Years in 2003
- Southwest Sports, Inc.
  - NWA Texas Heavyweight Championship (1 time)
  - NWA World Tag Team Championship (1 time) – with Hogan Wharton
- World Championship Wrestling (Australia)
  - IWA World Heavyweight Championship (1 time)
  - IWA World Tag Team Championship (2 times) – with Mario Milano (1) and Tex McKenzie (1)
- World Wide Wrestling Federation
  - WWWF World Tag Team Championship (1 time) – with Chief Jay Strongbow
- Other Titles
  - Fort Myers Heavyweight Championship (1 time)
