= WWE Home Video =

Video distribution and production company (1997–2023)

- Formerly: WWF Home Video (1997–2002)
- Type: Subsidiary
- Industry: Biography, tape library
- Founded: April 16, 1997; 29 years ago
- Defunct: December 26, 2023; 2 years ago
- Headquarters: Stamford, Connecticut, United States
- Parent: WWE (TKO Group Holdings)

WWE Home Video was a video distribution and production company that distributed WWE programming. A division of WWE formed on April 16, 1997, as WWF Home Video, it replaced a similar independent company owned by Evart Enterprises, Coliseum Video which operated between 1985 and 1997. The label became defunct on December 26, 2023.

== History ==
=== Coliseum Video ===
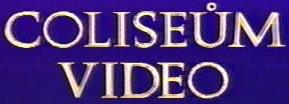
The Coliseum Video logo

World Wrestling Federation initially began releasing home videos of its content through Coliseum Video under the "WWF Official Video" label. The company was initially founded in 1985 by Evart Enterprises and released VHS and Betamax cassettes that generally fell into several categories:

- "Best-of" volumes highlighting classic matches, both recent and from the company's earlier years. Many of these releases included title changes that had happened since production of the previous volume was completed.
- Wrestler profiles, which encompassed the WWF careers of company wrestlers, both current and former.
- Theme videos, which showcased match types.
  - Each of the WWF's three major men's titles – the Heavyweight Championship, Intercontinental Championship and Tag Team Championship – had a volume dedicated to the title as it progressed from champion to champion, along with classic matches contested for the championship.
  - A handful of these volumes also showcased bloopers and comedy moments, rather than strictly wrestling matches.
- Pay-per-view and other live events.

Coliseum Video released videos of the two World Bodybuilding Federation events and two non-Titan videos: the music video for the New York Giants' "We're The New York Giants" and a Wayne Gretzky instructional video, Hockey My Way.

At the beginning of 1997, the WWF decided to part ways with Coliseum and release content in-house. Following the contract expiration, Coliseum ceased operations.

==== Legacy ====
On February 5, 2018, WWE released over 38 Coliseum Video releases on the WWE Network, branded as "WWE Home Video Classics".

=== WWF/WWE Home Video ===
The logos for WWE Home Video from 1997 to 2014

After ending the deal with Coliseum, the WWF began releasing home video releases in-house through WWF Home Video, which was founded in April 1997. Videos that were being or had been released by Coliseum Video were re-released with new packaging and the WWF Home Video name and logo.

When the WWF became WWE in 2002, the name of the home video subsidiary changed as well. Content released by WWE Home Video continued to release the same content as Coliseum did, and also releases content produced exclusively for home entertainment such as swimsuit videos and retrospective documentaries. Content from the World Wrestling Federation's "Attitude Era" (1998–2002), however, had to be edited due to the lawsuit that caused the WWF to become WWE. All WWF "scratch" logos and references to the initials WWF had to be blurred or edited out. However, the words "World Wrestling Federation" were not edited, and the old WWF logo was not blurred. Some of the early WWE home video releases were also not edited (such as The Rock Just Bring It; the 2002 editions of Backlash and Insurrextion also featured the WWE digital on-screen graphics inserted on top on the old WWF one). Some of the videos/DVDs in question were just renamed with the WWE logo.

In 2012, WWE and the World Wide Fund came to an agreement which allowed WWE to use the Scratch logo in past photos and videos, thus ending the blurring on 'Attitude Era' PPVs and shows; in return, the WWE is not permitted to use any WWF logos in new, original footage.

On November 19, 2014, WWE entered into a distribution partnership with Warner Home Video for North America. The deal also saw DVD releases coming from the defunct World Championship Wrestling (WCW), which was previously owned by Time Warner and sold to WWE in 2001. The deal came as a result of the success the two had with Scooby-Doo! WrestleMania Mystery, as well as a Flintstones crossover and a sequel to the Scooby-Doo crossover. Additionally, despite remaining top-sellers, WWE Home Video releases had been in a decline in recent years due to streaming media services such as WWE's own WWE Network.

==== International Distribution ====
The WWF began releasing home video products in the United Kingdom in July 1990 through an exclusive partnership with Silver Vision, a division of home video distributor Clear Vision. Their releases were initially distributed by The Video Collection before Silver Vision began releasing products independently. Silver Vision began releasing WWE releases in other European territories such as Germany (previously released through PolyGram Video). One popular line from Silver Vision was the UK-exclusive WWE Tagged Classics DVD series, which did not have any edits or censoring of the WWF initials. On 19 September 2012, Silver Vision announced on their website that the partnership between their parent Clear Vision Ltd. and WWE would end on 31 December 2012, with SummerSlam 2012 and nWo: The Revolution being their final WWE release.

On 19 November 2012, it was announced that FremantleMedia (now Fremantle) would be the new WWE Home Video distributor for the United Kingdom and the rest of Europe, releasing all future WWE DVD, Blu-ray, and digital-file-based releases in Europe, replacing Silver Vision. Their official UK website launched in January 2013 along with their initial releases - Night Of Champions 2012, Hell In A Cell 2012, Top 100 RAW Moments and The Attitude Era, all of which were issued on DVD and Blu-ray.

=== Discontinuation ===
On December 3, 2021, it was originally announced that WWE Home Video releases would be discontinued in the United States and Canada in early 2022, although releases in the United Kingdom and Germany by distributor Fremantle would be continuing. Despite this, WWE Home Video releases continued to be released throughout 2022 and 2023.

On December 5, 2023, Fremantle announced that they would not renew their British and German contract with WWE to continue releasing physical content. As such, Crown Jewel 2023 was the last WWE Home Video release in those regions. On the same day, it was revealed that WWE Home Video releases would be discontinued in North America as well, as no announcements were made by the company that they would release physical products in 2024 and beyond. Survivor Series: WarGames 2023 was the last WWE Home Video release in North America as well as their last release altogether. On December 31, 2023, they posted an announcement to their X (formerly known as Twitter) account that reads:

Today the story of WWE Home Video comes to an end.

It would not have been possible — or as much fun — without your support, participation, and love for collecting physical WWE releases.

WWE will no longer licence DVD or Blu-ray releases globally. So sadly, our story must end at this point.

We would like to extend a heartfelt thank you to all our fans, followers, and collectors.

We know that many of you in the UK became WWE fans through video and DVD. The history of home video has been intrinsic to the WWE UK fanbase.

Hang onto those tapes and discs. They represent true passion and loyalty — not to mention WWE history.

Happy New Year to you" all.

— WWE Home Video UK

== Expansion of the video library ==
With the expansion of the WWE Video Library, content has also been released from the vast library archives, including classic WWF, AWA, WCW, ECW, WCCW, and NWA content.

== Formats ==
Content was released exclusively in the DVD and UMD format (for selected documentaries only, until the format was discontinued) from mid-2005 (SummerSlam 2005 was the last VHS release) until their closure in 2023. WrestleMania XXIV was the company's first show, and the first sports related event, to be released on Blu-ray Disc, being released in stores on May 20, 2008, as a 2-disc set; it was also the only pay-per-view released on UMD. Some content (primarily pay-per-views) were also available on Video CD format through certain licensors in developing markets like India where Ultra Video was the licensee in the mid 2000s followed by Excel Home Video starting in 2010.

== See also ==
- TNA Wrestling Home Video
