= Joey Marella =

American professional wrestling referee (1963–1994)

Personal information
- Born: Joseph Anthony Marella; February 28, 1963 Willingboro Township, New Jersey, U.S.
- Died: July 4, 1994 (aged 31) New Jersey Turnpike near Willingboro, New Jersey, U.S.
- Family: Gorilla Monsoon (father)

Professional wrestling career
- Ring name: Joey Marella
- Debut: 1983

Joseph Anthony Marella (February 28, 1963 – July 4, 1994) was an American professional wrestling referee for the World Wrestling Federation and son of former wrestler and then WWF announcer Gorilla Monsoon (Robert Marella) from Willingboro Township, New Jersey.

== Career ==
Joey Marella joined the World Wrestling Federation in 1983, and moved through the ranks until he was often assigned to referee feature promotion matches. In 1987, he served as the referee for the much-hyped match between Hulk Hogan and André the Giant at WrestleMania III as well as their rematch in 1988 at WrestleMania IV. 10 minutes prior to their WrestleMania III match, André had asked Vince McMahon to choose Marella to be the referee for that match.

Marella was also the official for the 1992 SummerSlam main event of Bret Hart vs. Davey Boy Smith at London's famous Wembley Stadium. Marella was briefly suspended for a substance abuse problem in 1993 and then later re-hired.

He was also part of the controversy at the 1994 Royal Rumble match in which he and former WWF referee Earl Hebner couldn't decide between Lex Luger and Bret Hart as to who had won the match.

During Marella's career as a WWF referee, while becoming one of the Federation's most respected in-ring officials, he also became the butt of jokes for heel based commentators especially when they were teamed with Marella's father Gorilla Monsoon with Monsoon regularly using one of his catch phrases "Will you stop" (mostly said to either Jesse "The Body" Ventura or Bobby "The Brain" Heenan) when they would criticize his performance. This was actually an inside joke, as the fact that Monsoon and Marella were actually father and son was not well known by fans until after Marella had died. Earl Hebner discussed in an interview how Marella was a good person. Hebner revealed that he was scheduled to referee the last match on a card, but Marella offered to referee the last match so Hebner could get out early and fly home from the nearby Newark Airport.

== Other media ==
Marella also appeared in the 1989 WWF produced movie No Holds Barred as a referee during a wrestling match.

== Death and legacy ==
He died in a car accident on July 4, 1994, at the age of 31, after he fell asleep at the wheel and crashed into a guardrail and a tree while driving home on the New Jersey Turnpike after a night of refereeing WWF matches in Ocean City, Maryland. Bruno Lauer, better known by his ring name Harvey Wippleman, was with him at the time and was critically injured. Lauer was wearing a seatbelt, while Marella was not. Following his death, the WWF instituted rules that WWF personnel had to check into hotels when working late. Furthermore, they would no longer travel alone and everyone traveling together had to agree to travel. Marella is buried next to his father Gorilla Monsoon (1937–1999) at Lakeview Memorial Park in Cinnaminson, New Jersey. Images of a baseball player and a golfer were placed on his headstone due to his love of the two sports. As a tribute, WWE ring announcer Tony Chimel named his son after Marella. Marella's sister Valerie also named a son after her brother.

== See also ==
- List of premature professional wrestling deaths
