= King of the Ring (1993) =

World Wrestling Federation pay-per-view event

- Promotional poster featuring Hulk Hogan
- Promotion: World Wrestling Federation
- Date: June 13, 1993
- City: Fairborn, Ohio
- Venue: Nutter Center
- Attendance: 6,500
- Tagline: Who Will Be King? Be A Part Of the Coronation!

Pay-per-view chronology
← Previous; WrestleMania IX	Next → SummerSlam

King of the Ring event chronology
← Previous; First	Next → 1994

King of the Ring tournament chronology
← Previous; 1991	Next → 1994

The 1993 King of the Ring was a professional wrestling pay-per-view (PPV) event produced by the World Wrestling Federation (WWF, renamed WWE in 2002). It was the inaugural King of the Ring event and hosted the finals of the seventh King of the Ring tournament for men. The event took place on June 13, 1993, at the Nutter Center in Fairborn, Ohio. The last tournament was held in 1991.

Ten matches were held at the event. The central focus of the PPV was the tournament. Wrestlers gained entry by participating in qualifying matches on WWF television programs, and the second, third, and fourth rounds of the tournament were televised during the King of the Ring PPV broadcast. The 1991 tournament winner Bret Hart also won the 1993 tournament by defeating Bam Bam Bigelow in the final to become the only two-time "King of the Ring" winner, after defeating Razor Ramon and Mr. Perfect earlier in the show. During his coronation ceremony, he was attacked by Jerry Lawler, which led to a feud that lasted more than two years. In addition to the tournament, the event featured Yokozuna defeating Hulk Hogan to win the WWF Championship as well as Shawn Michaels retaining the WWF Intercontinental Championship in a match against Crush.

Reviews of the event were mainly positive. Several reviewers called Bret Hart's matches the highlight of the PPV. The match for the Intercontinental Championship received positive reviews, but the ending to the WWF Championship match, which featured Hulk Hogan in his final PPV appearance in the WWF until 2002, was criticized. The event was attended by 6,500 fans—the lowest attendance of any King of the Ring event—while the buyrate was the highest of any King of the Ring event until 1999. The event was released on VHS in North America and on VHS and DVD in the United Kingdom.

== Production ==
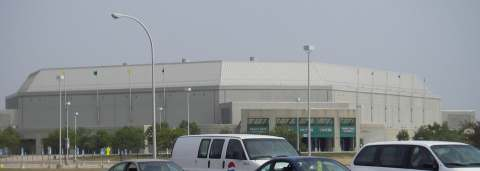
The inaugural King of the Ring event was held at the Nutter Center in Fairborn, Ohio.

=== Background ===
In 1985, the professional wrestling promotion World Wrestling Federation (WWF, renamed WWE in 2002) established the King of the Ring tournament, a men's single-elimination tournament with the winner crowned the "King of the Ring". It was held annually until 1991, with the exception of 1990. These early tournaments were held as special non-televised house shows in an effort to boost attendance at these events. In 1993, the WWF scheduled a pay-per-view (PPV) event named after the tournament. The King of the Ring PPV, which featured the seventh tournament, took place on June 13, 1993, at the Nutter Center in Fairborn, Ohio.

Unlike the previous non-televised events, the PPV did not feature all of the tournament's matches. Instead, several of the qualifying matches preceded the event with the final few matches then taking place at the PPV. There were also other matches that took place at the event as it was a traditional three-hour PPV.

=== Storylines ===
Seven of the eight entrants in the quarter-final matches wrestled in a qualifying round prior to the PPV broadcast, while Bret Hart was entered without needing to qualify. Lex Luger was the first wrestler to qualify, as he defeated Bob Backlund in a match televised on the May 2 episode of Wrestling Challenge. Six days later, Razor Ramon was added to the tournament after he defeated Tito Santana on Superstars of Wrestling. On May 9, "Hacksaw" Jim Duggan pinned Papa Shango on Wrestling Challenge to become the fourth entrant. The following night, Bam Bam Bigelow qualified by defeating Typhoon on a live episode of Monday Night Raw. On the May 15 episode of Superstars of Wrestling, Tatanka faced Giant Gonzalez in a qualifying match. Gonzalez choked his opponent and was disqualified by referee Bill Alfonso - whom Gonzalez attacked after the match; as a result, Tatanka advanced to the next round of the tournament. Mr. Perfect and Doink the Clown wrestled three qualifying matches against each other, before a decisive winner could be found to advance in the tournament. They first faced each other on the May 1 episode of Superstars of Wrestling, but the match was declared a draw when the time limit expired. Their next match took place on the May 16 episode of Wrestling Challenge and again resulted in time-limit draw. On the May 24 episode of Monday Night Raw, a third match between the two was ordered, this time with no time limit, and Perfect pinned Doink to advance to the seventh spot in the quarter-finals. In the final qualifying match, Mr. Hughes defeated Kamala on the May 23 episode of Wrestling Challenge.

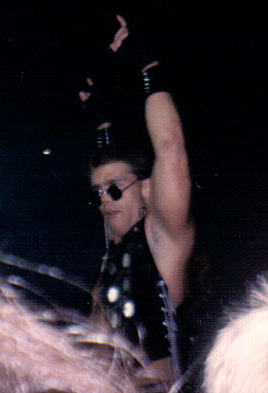
Shawn Michaels feuded with Crush over the Intercontinental Championship.

At WrestleMania IX, Bret Hart dropped the WWF Championship to Yokozuna. At the conclusion of the match, Mr. Fuji, Yokozuna's manager, threw salt in Hart's eyes, enabling Yokozuna to win the match. After the match, Hulk Hogan came to the ring to help Hart. Fuji challenged Hogan to a match for the WWF Championship, which took place immediately. Fuji attempted to throw salt in Hogan's eyes, but Hogan moved and the salt hit Yokozuna instead. Hogan quickly defeated Yokozuna to become the new WWF Champion. Due to a real-life arrangement with WWF owner Vince McMahon, Hogan was supposed to lose the title to Bret Hart, but he changed his mind and refused to lose to Hart. He formed a compromise that allowed him to face Yokozuna in a rematch at King of the Ring. He did not want to be pinned cleanly, so he insisted on a storyline in which he would lose the belt due to outside interference. As a result of Hart's controversial loss, Jack Tunney, who played the on-screen role of WWF President, granted Hart entry into the King of the Ring tournament without requiring him to win a qualifying match.

Crush faced WWF Intercontinental Champion Shawn Michaels several times in early 1993 but was unable to win the title belt. The pair also faced each other in a qualifying match for the King of the Ring tournament on the May 22 episode of Superstars of Wrestling. The match ended in a double countout and both wrestlers were eliminated from the tournament. It was later announced that they would wrestle each other at King of the Ring 1993, with Michaels's championship on the line.

The event also featured an eight-man tag team match that pitted the fan favorite team of The Steiner Brothers (Rick Steiner and Scott Steiner) and The Smoking Gunns (Billy Gunn and Bart Gunn) against the villain team of Money Inc. (Ted DiBiase and Irwin R. Schyster) and The Headshrinkers (Samu and Fatu). The Steiners and The Headshrinkers had faced each other at WrestleMania in a match won by the Steiners. The Steiners then moved on to feud with Money Inc., the WWF Tag Team Champions. The Gunns made their WWF debut in the spring of 1993 and faced The Headshrinkers in a series of matches. The match was not a standard tag team match so the championship was not on the line.

== Event ==
Other on-screen personnel
Role:	Name:
Commentators	Jim Ross
Commentators	Bobby Heenan
Commentators	Randy Savage
Referees	Mike Chioda
Referees	Earl Hebner
Referees	Joey Marella
Interviewers	Gene Okerlund
Interviewers	Terry Taylor
Ring announcer	Howard Finkel
Other	Rene Goulet

=== Pre-show ===
Before the live PPV broadcast began, a dark match took place between Owen Hart and Papa Shango. Papa Shango pinned Hart to retain the USWA Unified World Heavyweight Championship, which was being defended in the WWF as part of a talent exchange program between the WWF and the United States Wrestling Association (USWA).

=== Tournament matches ===
In the first televised match of the event, Bret Hart fought Razor Ramon. Hart got the early advantage, but Ramon used his size advantage to control much of the match. He performed a fallaway slam and a running powerslam but was unable to pin Hart. Hart performed several of his signature moves, including a Russian legsweep and an elbow drop from the second rope. Ramon regained control of the match and attempted to execute a suplex from the top rope. Hart landed on top of Ramon and pinned him to win the match.

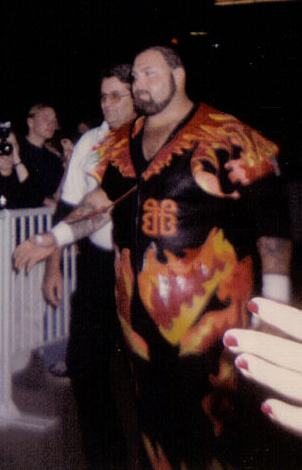
Bam Bam Bigelow defeated "Hacksaw" Jim Duggan and received a bye to the final round.

Mr. Hughes used his strength advantage to control the early stages of the following match against Mr. Perfect. After he missed a leg drop, Perfect used the opportunity to perform a neckbreaker on Hughes. Hughes picked up the urn that he had stolen from The Undertaker and hit Perfect with it. As a result, Hughes was disqualified and Mr. Perfect advanced to the next round.

In the next match, "Hacksaw" Jim Duggan faced Bam Bam Bigelow. Neither wrestler was able to gain an advantage until Duggan was thrown into the corner of the ring. He suffered a storyline injury, which allowed Bigelow to place Duggan in a bear hug. Duggan bit Bigelow to escape from the hold. He executed a powerslam and attempted to perform his signature move, a charging clothesline. Bigelow moved out of the way and performed a diving headbutt on Duggan to get the pinfall victory.

Tatanka gained the early advantage over Lex Luger in the next match. He performed a crossbody to knock Luger down to the mat. Luger elbowed Tatanka to escape from a hold and then executed a chinlock on Tatanka. Tatanka came back by performing a knife-edge chop on Luger. He attempted the same move from the top rope, but Luger blocked him. Luger performed a clothesline on Tatanka to knock him down, but he was unable to pin him. The time limit expired, and both wrestlers were eliminated from the tournament. As a result, Bigelow received a bye into the final round.

The semi-final round of the tournament took place immediately after the first round, and Mr. Perfect gained the early advantage over Bret Hart. Hart reversed the momentum of the match by applying a series of headlocks on Perfect. Perfect then performed a dropkick on Hart and followed it up by pushing him off the edge of the ring into the steel barricade on the arena floor. Perfect then performed another dropkick, but Hart recovered and executed a superplex on Perfect. Hart wore down Perfect's leg with a figure four leglock and attempted to perform the Sharpshooter, his finishing maneuver. Perfect blocked the move and attempted to perform the Perfectplex, his finishing move, on Hart. Hart reversed it, and both men were thrown out of the ring. When they returned, Perfect tried to pin Hart with a small package. Hart reversed the move to get the pinfall victory and advance to the tournament final.

=== Other matches ===
The WWF Championship match came next, as Hulk Hogan defended his title against Yokozuna. Yokozuna controlled the beginning of the match until he ran at Hogan in the corner but missed an avalanche splash. Hogan tried twice to body slam Yokozuna but could not pick him up. Yokozuna performed a bear hug on Hogan and tried to pin him after executing a belly to belly suplex. Hogan kicked Yokozuna in the face three times and knocked him down to the mat. He performed a leg drop, his signature move, on Yokozuna but was unable to pin him. As Hogan prepared to attempt to body slam Yokozuna, manager Harvey Wippleman, disguised as a planted photographer, jumped up onto the edge of the ring. His camera exploded in Hogan's face, which allowed Yokozuna to knock Hogan down and perform a leg drop. Yokozuna pinned Hogan to regain the WWF Championship and performed a Banzai drop on Hogan after the match.

In the next match, the team of the Steiner Brothers (Rick Steiner and Scott Steiner) and The Smoking Gunns (Billy Gunn and Bart Gunn) faced the team of Money Inc. (Ted DiBiase and Irwin R. Schyster) and The Headshrinkers (Samu and Fatu). The match began with the Steiners in control as they took turns attacking DiBiase. Fatu and Bart Gunn entered the match, and Fatu and his teammates wore Bart down while preventing him from tagging in a partner. Billy Gunn fought DiBiase and controlled the match until DiBiase performed the Million Dollar Dream on Billy. DiBiase released the hold and gloated about his performance. This enabled Billy Gunn to surprise DiBiase with a small package pinfall to win the match. After the match, the teams continued to fight until the Steiners and Gunns cleared their opponents from the ring.

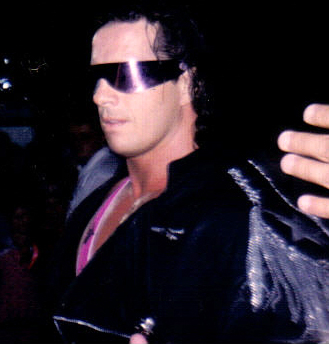
Bret Hart won the King of the Ring tournament.

The following match featured Shawn Michaels defending his WWF Intercontinental Championship against Crush. Crush controlled the early portion of the match by performing several dropkicks on Michaels, which he followed with a military press slam and a tilt-a-whirl backbreaker. Michaels left the ring to recover and returned to attack Crush's head. Michaels was unable to pin Crush, who threw him out of the ring. Two wrestlers dressed as Doink the Clown, with whom Crush had been feuding, came to the ring to distract Crush. Michaels performed a superkick, his signature move, and pinned Crush to retain the championship.

=== Tournament final ===
The final match of the evening was between Bret Hart and Bam Bam Bigelow to determine the winner of the tournament. Bigelow used his strength advantage to control the beginning of the match. He threw Hart out of the ring and focused on injuring Hart's back. Hart escaped from a bear hug and pushed Bigelow into the steel rail at ringside. Bigelow responded by pushing Hart's back into the ring post. Luna Vachon, Bigelow's valet, hit Hart with a chair, which enabled Bigelow to pin Hart and be declared the winner. Referee Earl Hebner came to the ring and explained to Joey Marella, the referee for the match, what had happened. The match was ordered to continue, and Bigelow continued to attack Hart's back. While Bigelow was outside of the ring, Hart performed a flying crossbody by jumping over the top rope and landing on Bigelow. He attempted to perform the Sharpshooter but was unable. As Bigelow ran at Hart in the corner of the ring, Hart moved out of the way. He climbed onto Bigelow's shoulders and flipped Bigelow forward to pin him with a victory roll.

A coronation ceremony took place, in which Hart was proclaimed King of the Ring. Jerry Lawler interrupted the ceremony and claimed to be the only king in the WWF. He had been using the nickname "The King" since defeating Jackie Fargo for the AWA Southern Heavyweight Championship in 1974 and did not want to share the title. Lawler attacked Hart and hit him with the scepter and throne that were being used for the ceremony. As the PPV went off the air, Hart was lying on the floor, unable to fight back.

== Reception ==
Reviews for the event are mainly positive. Writing for Online Onslaught, columnist Adam Gutschmidt stated that the event is the best King of the Ring show to watch. He called all three of Bret Hart's matches "outstanding" but was not as impressed with any of the other matches on the card. He thought that the eight-man match served no real purpose, the match between Luger and Tatanka was poorly planned and executed, and that the WWF Championship match was the worst on the card. Also writing for Online Onslaught, Rick Scaia also enjoyed Bret Hart's matches. He thought that the match between Tatanka and Luger was a "good booking decision" and that the wrestlers performed well in the match. He also enjoyed the endings to the WWF Championship match and the Intercontinental Championship match. The review from The Other Arena also praised Bret Hart's matches, as well as the Intercontinental Championship match. The other matches were not rated as highly, although only the WWF Championship match was said to be a bad match.

The attendance for the event was 6,500 fans, who paid a total of $80,000 in admission. This is the lowest attendance figure for a King of the Ring event. The attendance the following year was almost twice as large, as 12,000 fans attended King of the Ring 1994. The PPV buyrate was 1.1, which was the highest buyrate in King of the Ring history until the 1999 event.

The event, which lead to Hogan leaving the WWF for the rest of the 1990s and Bret Hart having his standing in the WWF boosted by winning the King of the Ring tournament, is also considered to be a major pillar for the WWF's "New Generation" era.

== Aftermath ==
For the remainder of the summer, Hulk Hogan resumed his feud with Yokozuna on the international house show circuit. He then left the WWF and focused on his acting career. He starred in Thunder in Paradise, a weekly syndicated television show that ran from 1993 to 1994. While filming the show, he was offered a contract with World Championship Wrestling (WCW), the WWF's main competitor. He joined WCW in summer 1994 and wrestled his first match at Bash at the Beach 1994, where he defeated Ric Flair to win the WCW World Heavyweight Championship. He continued to wrestle for the company until the summer of 2000. WCW subsequently went out of business in the spring of 2001 and Hogan did not return to the WWF until early 2002.

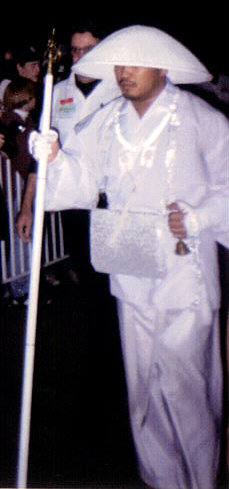
Jerry Lawler escalated his feud with Bret Hart by getting Hakushi involved.

Yokozuna held the WWF Championship for over nine months before dropping the belt to Bret Hart. Shawn Michaels was stripped of the Intercontinental Championship in September 1993, which set up a battle royal in which Razor Ramon became the next champion. The Steiner Brothers continued to feud with Money Inc. over the WWF Tag Team Championship. They defeated DiBiase and Schyster the day after King of the Ring to win the belts. They held them for two days before losing them to Money Inc. Three days later, the Steiners regained the belts, which they held for the remainder of the feud.

Jerry Lawler feuded with Bret Hart for more than two years after King of the Ring. They faced each other at SummerSlam 1993 to determine the true king of the WWF. Lawler won the match and the title after Hart was disqualified. They were supposed to wrestle against each other at Survivor Series 1993 in an elimination match, but Lawler was unable to appear because he had been charged with rape and sodomy in real life. The accuser later admitted that she had falsified the charges. Hart feuded with his brother Owen throughout 1994, so the feud with Lawler lay dormant. Lawler accused Bret Hart of being a racist in 1995 in order to create problems between Hart and Japanese wrestler Hakushi. This re-ignited the feud between Hart and Lawler, and they faced each other at In Your House 1. Hakushi interfered in the match, which enabled Lawler to pin Hart. This set up a "Kiss my Foot" match between Hart and Lawler at King of the Ring 1995. According to the stipulation, the loser would be forced to kiss the winner's feet. Lawler lost and brought in his dentist, Isaac Yankem, who soon debuted in the WWF. Yankem wrestled Hart at SummerSlam 1995; Hart won the match by disqualification after Yankem and Lawler choked Hart with the ring ropes.

King of the Ring continued as the annual June PPV until the 2002 event, which was the same year that the WWF was renamed to World Wrestling Entertainment (WWE). During its years as a PPV, it was considered one of the promotion's "Big Five" PPVs, along with the Royal Rumble, WrestleMania, SummerSlam, and Survivor Series, the company's five biggest shows produced throughout the year. Although the promotion ceased producing the event as a PPV after the 2002 event, WWE continued to periodically hold the tournament across their weekly television programs, Raw and SmackDown, with the finals being held on an episode of Raw or at another PPV, such as Judgment Day for the 2006 tournament. Although King of the Ring ended its run as a PPV with the 2002 event, one further event promoted under the King of the Ring event chronology was held in 2015. It featured the semifinals and finals of the 2015 tournament and aired exclusively as an event on WWE's online streaming service, the WWE Network, which launched in February 2014. In 2024, WWE revived the event once more, but rebranded as King and Queen of the Ring to incorporate the women's version of the tournament that had been established in 2021. This event aired on both PPV and via WWE's livestreaming platforms. The event would go on hiatus again as subsequent tournaments have since concluded at the annual Night of Champions event.

Following Hulk Hogan's death in 2025, Jim Ross, who provided color commentary for the event, stated on the August 8, 2025, edition of his Grilling JR with Jim Ross podcast that Hogan actually wanted to leave the WWF while still retaining the title and was hesitant to go through with the loss to Yokozuna.

== Home media and streaming ==
The event was released on VHS in North America by Coliseum Video on August 11, 1993. In the United Kingdom, it was released in August 1993 by Silver Vision.

Packaged together with King of the Ring 1994, it was released on DVD in the United Kingdom as part of the WWE Tagged Classics line on July 5, 2004.

In 2014, the event was included on the WWE's streaming platform the WWE Network as part of its launch and remained on the service until the platform closed. In June 2025, WWE uploaded the event to stream freely on their WWE Vault YouTube channel.

== Results ==
No.	Results	Stipulations	Times
1^{D}	Papa Shango (c) defeated Owen Hart	Singles match for the USWA Unified World Heavyweight Championship	—
2	Bret Hart defeated Razor Ramon	King of the Ring quarter-final match	10:25
3	Mr. Perfect defeated Mr. Hughes (with Harvey Wippleman) by disqualification	King of the Ring quarter-final match	6:02
4	Bam Bam Bigelow defeated Jim Duggan	King of the Ring quarter-final match	4:59
5	Lex Luger vs. Tatanka ended in a time-limit draw	King of the Ring quarter-final match	15:00
6	Bret Hart defeated Mr. Perfect	King of the Ring semi-final match	18:56
7	Yokozuna (with Mr. Fuji) defeated Hulk Hogan (c) (with Jimmy Hart)	Singles match for the WWF Championship	13:08
8	The Steiner Brothers (Rick and Scott) and The Smoking Gunns (Billy and Bart) defeated Money Inc. (Ted DiBiase and Irwin R. Schyster) and The Headshrinkers (Samu and Fatu) (with Afa)	Eight-man tag team match	6:49
9	Shawn Michaels (c) (with Diesel) defeated Crush	Singles match for the WWF Intercontinental Championship	11:14
10	Bret Hart defeated Bam Bam Bigelow	King of the Ring final match	18:11
(c) / – the champion(s) heading into the match; D / – this was a dark match

=== Tournament brackets ===
The tournament took place between May 2 and June 13, 1993. The tournament brackets were:

First Round (TV)
Bret Hart
BYE
Razor Ramon	Pin
Tito Santana	3:21
Mr. Perfect	Pin
Doink the Clown	11:30
Kamala	2:45
Mr. Hughes	CO
Jim Duggan	Pin
Papa Shango	8:39
Bam Bam Bigelow	Pin
Typhoon	5:08
Bob Backlund	4:53
Lex Luger	CO
Tatanka	DQ
Giant Gonzales	2:59

Quarterfinals (PPV)
Bret Hart	Pin
Razor Ramon	10:25
Mr. Perfect	6:02
Mr. Hughes	DQ
Jim Duggan	Pin
Bam Bam Bigelow	4:59
Lex Luger	Draw
Tatanka	15:00

Semifinals (PPV)
Bret Hart	Pin
Mr. Perfect	18:56
Bam Bam Bigelow
BYE

Final (PPV)
Bret Hart	Pin
Bam Bam Bigelow	18:11
