= WrestleMania Vegas =

WrestleMania Vegas is a promotional name that has been used by WWE for their biggest professional wrestling event, WrestleMania, when held in the Las Vegas, United States area.

It may refer to:

- WrestleMania 41, a 2025 event
- WrestleMania 42, a 2026 event

== Other ==
- WrestleMania IX, a 1993 event that was also held in the Las Vegas area, but was only promoted by its numerical number
