= King of the Ring (1991) =

Professional wrestling tournament by World Wrestling Federation

- Promotion: World Wrestling Federation
- Date: September 7, 1991
- City: Providence, Rhode Island
- Venue: Providence Civic Center
- Attendance: 2,400

King of the Ring tournament chronology
← Previous; 1989	Next → 1993

The 1991 King of the Ring was the sixth King of the Ring professional wrestling tournament produced by the World Wrestling Federation (WWF, now WWE). The tournament was held on September 7, 1991 at the Providence Civic Center in Providence, Rhode Island as a special non-televised house show. The 1991 tournament was won by Bret Hart. In addition to the tournament, there was only one other match during the night. In this match The Beverly Brothers (Beau Beverly and Blake Beverly) defeated The Bushwhackers (Bushwhacker Butch and Bushwhacker Luke) in a tag team match. A tournament did not occur in 1992 but returned in 1993 as the promotion's annual June pay-per-view.

== Production ==
=== Background ===
The King of the Ring tournament is a single-elimination tournament that was established by the World Wrestling Federation (WWF, now WWE) in 1985 with the winner being crowned the "King of the Ring." It was held annually until 1989. The event did not occur in 1990, but returned in 1991. The 1991 tournament was the sixth King of the Ring tournament. It was held on September 7, 1991 at the Providence Civic Center in Providence, Rhode Island and like the previous years, it was a special non-televised house show.

=== Storylines ===
The matches resulted from scripted storylines, where wrestlers portrayed heroes, villains, or less distinguishable characters in scripted events that built tension and culminated in a wrestling match or series of matches. Results were predetermined by the WWF's writers.

== Aftermath ==
A tournament was not held in 1992, however, it returned in 1993. Starting with the 1993 King of the Ring, the tournament moved to the annual King of the Ring pay-per-view (PPV) event, held annually until the 2002 King of the Ring; that same year, the WWF was renamed to World Wrestling Entertainment (WWE). Following the 2002 event, the tournament would only be held periodically across episodes of Raw and SmackDown, although the final match of the 2006 tournament took place at the Judgment Day PPV, while the semifinals and finals of the 2015 tournament aired as a WWE Network-exclusive event.

Following his win in the 1993 tournament, Bret Hart became the only two-time King of the Ring winner, as well as the only person to win back-to-back as well.

== Results ==
No.	Results	Stipulations	Times
1	Jerry Sags (with Jimmy Hart) defeated Hawk by disqualification	King of the Ring tournament first round match	3:02
2	Ricky Steamboat vs. Ted DiBiase ended in a time limit draw	King of the Ring tournament first round match	15:00
3	Jim Duggan defeated Brian Knobbs (with Jimmy Hart)	King of the Ring tournament first round match	5:04
4	Irwin R. Schyster defeated The Berzerker by count-out	King of the Ring tournament first round match	2:51
5	Bret Hart defeated Pete Doherty by submission	King of the Ring tournament first round match	0:33
6	Skinner defeated Virgil	King of the Ring tournament first round match	5:02
7	Sid Justice defeated The Warlord	King of the Ring tournament first round match	3:23
8	The Undertaker (with Paul Bearer) defeated Animal	King of the Ring tournament first round match	3:40
9	The Beverly Brothers (Beau Beverly and Blake Beverly) defeated The Bushwhackers (Bushwhacker Butch and Bushwhacker Luke)	Tag team match	7:23
10	Irwin R. Schyster defeated Jim Duggan	King of the Ring tournament quarter-final match	3:16
11	Bret Hart defeated Skinner	King of the Ring tournament quarter-final match	4:47
12	The Undertaker and Sid Justice ended in a double disqualification	King of the Ring tournament quarter-final match	4:08
13	Irwin R. Schyster defeated Jerry Sags	King of the Ring tournament semi-final match	1:22
14	Bret Hart defeated Irwin R. Schyster	King of the Ring tournament final match	10:00

=== Tournament bracket ===
First Round
Hawk	DQ
Jerry Sags	3:02
Ricky Steamboat	Draw
Ted DiBiase	15:00
Jim Duggan	Pin
Brian Knobbs	5:04
The Berzerker	CO
Irwin R. Schyster	2:51
Pete Doherty ^{1}	Sub
Bret Hart	0:33
Skinner	Pin
Virgil	5:02
Sid Justice	Pin
The Warlord	3:23
Animal	Pin
The Undertaker	3:40

Quarterfinals
Jerry Sags
BYE
Jim Duggan	Pin
Irwin R. Schyster	3:16
Bret Hart	Sub
Skinner	4:47
The Undertaker	DDQ^{2}
Sid Justice	4:08

Semifinals
Jerry Sags	Pin
Irwin R. Schyster	1:22
Bret Hart
BYE

Final
Irwin R. Schyster	Pin
Bret Hart	10:00

1. Pete Doherty substituted for Texas Tornado.
2. The Undertaker and Sid Justice were disqualified for attacking the referee. After the bout, Jake Roberts helped The Undertaker put Sid into the Casket.
