= WrestleMania IX =

1993 World Wrestling Federation pay-per-view event

- Promotional poster featuring various WWF wrestlers
- Promotion: World Wrestling Federation
- Date: April 4, 1993
- City: Paradise, Nevada
- Venue: Caesars Palace
- Attendance: 16,891
- Tagline: The World's Largest Toga Party

Pay-per-view chronology
← Previous; Royal Rumble	Next → King of the Ring

WrestleMania chronology
← Previous; VIII	Next → X

WrestleMania IX was a 1993 professional wrestling pay-per-view (PPV) event produced by the World Wrestling Federation (WWF, renamed WWE in 2002). It was the ninth annual WrestleMania and took place on April 4, 1993, at Caesars Palace in Paradise, Nevada in the Las Vegas area. This was the first WrestleMania event held in an outdoor venue, which was a purpose-built temporary stadium outside of Caesars Palace, and in line with the Roman theme of the resort, it was made to look like a Roman coliseum.

WrestleMania IX was built around two main storylines. The first was the seemingly unstoppable Yokozuna challenging Bret Hart for the WWF Championship in the main event, a right he earned by winning the 1993 Royal Rumble. The other major storyline was the return of Hulk Hogan, who had departed the WWF following WrestleMania VIII but returned to team with Brutus Beefcake against the WWF Tag Team Champions, Money Inc. (Ted DiBiase and Irwin R. Schyster). Hogan and Beefcake lost the tag team match, but later that night after Yokozuna defeated Hart for the WWF Championship, Hogan faced and defeated Yokozuna to win the title in an impromptu 22-second match. In addition, Shawn Michaels retained the Intercontinental Championship, though he lost his match against Tatanka.

The event has been panned by critics and fans alike. The most frequent criticism has been related to the match between The Undertaker and Giant Gonzalez, Hulk Hogan's title win, and the Roman togas worn by announcers. It is frequently described as amongst the worst WrestleManias of all time. Both the pay-per-view buyrate and the attendance for the event dropped from the previous year's WrestleMania VIII.

== Production ==
=== Background ===
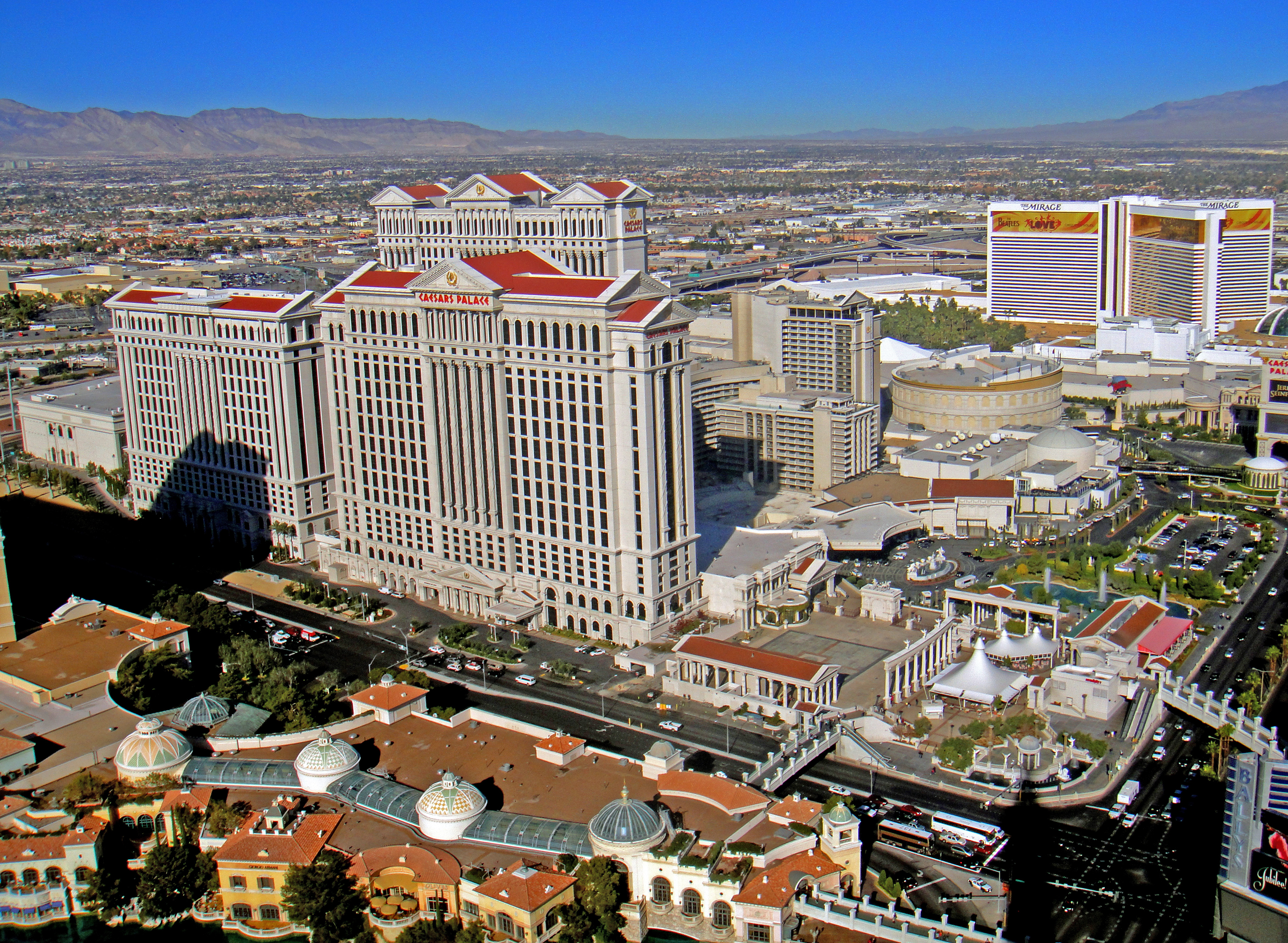
The ninth annual WrestleMania was held at a purpose-built temporary outdoor stadium outside of Caesars Palace (pictured) in the Las Vegas suburb of Paradise, Nevada, which was the first WrestleMania held in an outdoor venue.

WrestleMania is considered the World Wrestling Federation's (WWF, renamed WWE in 2002) flagship professional wrestling pay-per-view (PPV) event, having first been held in 1985. It is held annually between mid-March to mid-April. It was the first of the WWF's original four PPVs, which includes Royal Rumble, SummerSlam, and Survivor Series, referred to as the "Big Four". WrestleMania IX was scheduled to be held on April 4, 1993, at Caesars Palace in the Las Vegas suburb of Paradise, Nevada.

This was the first WrestleMania held entirely outdoors, a concept the company did not use again until WrestleMania XXIV in 2008. Because WrestleMania IX was held at the Roman themed Caesars Palace, the WWF promoted the event as the "World's Largest Toga Party". The stadium was a purpose-built temporary structure outside of Caesars Palace that was made to look like a Roman coliseum, and the event featured guards, trumpeters, and several live animals. The company built on this theme by having the commentators, including debuting announcer Jim Ross, wear togas. Ring announcer Howard Finkel was also renamed "Finkus Maximus" for the day. Randy Savage came to the broadcast booth accompanied by women throwing flower petals and feeding him grapes while he rode on a couch carried by guards. Bobby Heenan made his entrance wearing a toga and riding a camel backwards.

Early TV promos for WrestleMania IX ticket sales, airing in December 1992, focused on shots of Hulk Hogan and Bret Hart, with quick shots of Doink the Clown, Razor Ramon, Crush, Shawn Michaels, Ric Flair, and Randy Savage also shown. Hogan had notably not appeared on WWF TV since April of that year. Flair, however, would not be on the roster by the time of the event.

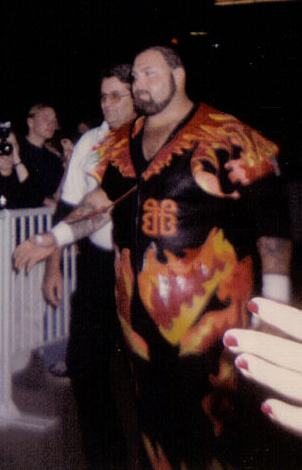
Bam Bam Bigelow's planned match at the event was canceled.

Hulk Hogan's visibly damaged eye was explained in the storyline as the result of thugs attacking Hogan outside a Las Vegas gym the night before and Hogan revealed in his interview with Gene Okerlund that Ted DiBiase was the one who paid the thugs to attack him. In reality, the cause of injury has been open to debate. One theory is that Randy Savage punched Hogan because he believed that his ex-wife Elizabeth Hulette had an affair with Hogan while Savage and Hulette were married (the couple divorced in September 1992). WWF officials claimed that the injury was the result of a jet ski accident.

A match was scheduled between Bam Bam Bigelow and Kamala, but it was canceled due to time constraints before the event began.

According to Bret Hart, he was originally booked to retain the WWF Championship at WrestleMania IX, but two days before the event, he was told by WWF chairman Vince McMahon to drop the title to Yokozuna at the event. In later years, it was acknowledged that the booking of the final match, which saw Hart lose the championship to Yokozuna and then Hogan having a surprise match where he defeated Yokozuna to win the title, was changed solely to please Hogan. According to Jim Ross, Hogan was "the one guy" at the time of the event who could get more importance in the company than McMahon—who was also under greater investigation by the U.S. Department of Justice—when it came to arranging his creative direction. Ross had also stated that while he knew Hogan would leave WrestleMania IX as the champion, he did not know how the title change was going to happen.

=== Storylines ===
One of the feuds heading into the event was between Tatanka and Intercontinental Champion Shawn Michaels. Tatanka was in the midst of an undefeated streak and had wrestled Michaels twice in the months leading up to WrestleMania IX. Tatanka pinned Michaels in a singles match on the February 13, 1993, episode of Superstars of Wrestling and later teamed with The Nasty Boys in a six-man match against Michaels and the Beverly Brothers; Tatanka pinned Michaels to win this match as well. Michaels was also feuding with Sensational Sherri, who stood in Tatanka's corner during the match. Sherri had been Michaels' valet. When Marty Jannetty tried to hit Michaels with a mirror, however, Michaels pulled Sherri in front of him to protect himself. Sherri's anger at getting hit over the head with a mirror caused her to turn on him at Royal Rumble 1993.

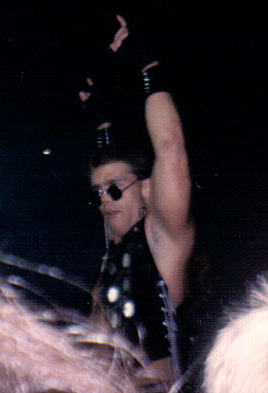
Shawn Michaels feuded with Tatanka leading up to WrestleMania.

The match between The Steiner Brothers (Rick Steiner and Scott Steiner) and The Headshrinkers (Samu and Fatu) had little background, although Afa, who managed The Headshrinkers, claimed that his team would "tear [the Steiners'] heads off". Doink the Clown and Crush had been feuding since the January 2, 1993, episode of WWF Superstars of Wrestling. After Crush's match on that show, he confronted Doink, who had thrown a ball at a child in the audience. Crush grabbed Doink by the arm and warned him not to play any more pranks on children. Doink, wearing a cast on the arm that Crush had supposedly injured by grabbing, came to ringside during Crush's match on the January 18 episode of WWF Monday Night Raw. He apologized to Crush and gave him a flower; when Crush walked away, Doink removed a prosthetic arm from his cast and attacked Crush, who was later taken away in an ambulance due to kayfabe (storyline) injuries. For storyline purposes, Crush was said to be too injured to compete in the 1993 Royal Rumble match. Doink continued his pranks by squirting Crush with a water pistol and recording video messages to Crush, which showed two Doinks on the screen.

The feud between The Mega-Maniacs (Brutus Beefcake and Hulk Hogan) and WWF Tag Team Champions Money Inc. (Ted DiBiase and Irwin R. Schyster) stemmed from a legitimate parasailing accident in 1990 that forced Beefcake to undergo reconstructive surgery to his face. On the February 8st episode of Monday Night Raw, Beefcake announced that he was able to wrestle again, however later in the show, Money Inc. came out and both challenged Beefacke, DiBiase won the coin toss to face Beefcake, however their manager Jimmy Hart protested the idea. A week later the match took place with Beefcake winning the match by disqualification when Schyster attacked Beefcake with the briefcase. Then Money Inc. tried to attack him again with briefcase, but Jimmy Hart kept telling them to stop, Money Inc. then fired Hart as their manager and Schyster then hit Beefcake in the face with the briefcase, Hart came back into the ring after being thrown out by Schyster and went over to Beefcake thus becoming Beefcake's manager. Hart later claimed that he felt the need to "step up and do the right thing" and that he "had a change of heart", and his intervention led to him becoming a babyface, or crowd favorite. Shortly thereafter, Hulk Hogan made his return to the WWF and joined with Beefcake, and manager Jimmy Hart, to form The Mega-Maniacs and challenge Money Inc. for the WWF Tag Team Championship.

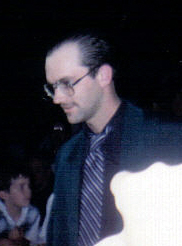
Harvey Wippleman managed many wrestlers during his feud with The Undertaker.

Mr. Perfect's rivalry with Bobby Heenan dated back to Survivor Series (1992). Perfect and Ric Flair were managed by Heenan, but Perfect turned on Flair and Heenan by agreeing to face them as part of a tag team match at Survivor Series. Flair feuded briefly with Perfect but left the company to return to World Championship Wrestling. Lex Luger had joined Vince McMahon's World Bodybuilding Federation, but he signed with McMahon's WWF when the bodybuilding company failed. He made his debut at Royal Rumble 1993, where he was unveiled as Heenan's latest wrestler, Narcissus (although the ring name was changed to "The Narcissist" Lex Luger).

The Undertaker's feud with Giant Gonzalez was an offshoot of The Undertaker's feud with manager Harvey Wippleman. The Undertaker defeated Kamala, who was managed by Wippleman, at SummerSlam 1992. A rematch was held at Survivor Series 1992, and The Undertaker beat Kamala in a coffin match. Wippleman vowed revenge, and he introduced Gonzalez at Royal Rumble 1993 and instructed him to attack The Undertaker. The Undertaker was eliminated from the Royal Rumble match as a result of the interference, and a match was scheduled between The Undertaker and Giant Gonzalez for WrestleMania IX.

Beginning with his debut with the company in 1992, Yokozuna was pushed by the WWF as an unstoppable monster heel. Weighing over 500 pounds, he used the Banzai Drop, a move in which he jumped from the second rope and sat on his opponent's chest, to defeat several of the WWF's biggest stars. In a notable match on the February 6, 1993, episode of WWF Superstars of Wrestling, Yokozuna attacked "Hacksaw" Jim Duggan and performed the Banzai Drop four times. Due to the kayfabe injuries from the attack, Duggan was unable to wrestle for over two months. Yokozuna earned a title shot against WWF Champion Bret Hart by winning the 1993 Royal Rumble match. During the contract signing, Yokozuna attacked Hart and performed the Banzai Drop on him.

== Event ==
Other on-screen personnel
Role:	Name:
Presenter	Gorilla Monsoon
Commentators	Jim Ross
Commentators	Bobby Heenan
Commentators	Randy Savage
Interviewers	Gene Okerlund
Interviewers	Todd Pettengill
Interviewers	Raymond Rougeau
Ring announcer	Finkus Maximus
Referees	Bill Alfonso
Referees	Danny Davis
Referees	Earl Hebner
Referees	Joey Marella

Before the televised broadcast began, Tito Santana defeated Papa Shango in a dark match, which became available for viewing on April 4, 2019, in the Hidden Gems section on WWE Network and is also notable as the WWE debut of Jim Ross on commentary.

In the first match of the pay-per-view event, WWF Intercontinental Champion Shawn Michaels was accompanied to the ring by a new valet, Luna Vachon. Sensational Sherri followed Tatanka to the ring to prevent Vachon from getting involved in the match. During the match, Vachon approached Tatanka twice outside the ring, but Sherri was able to intervene and stop Vachon from interfering. Tatanka spent much of the match trying to injure Michaels with an armbar hold. Michaels gained the advantage and almost pinned Tatanka with a victory roll, but Tatanka escaped the pin attempt and performed a war dance to channel his energy. Michaels threw Tatanka out of the ring and tried to jump at him to attack, but Tatanka moved. Michaels was unable to return to the ring within ten seconds; he pulled the referee out of the ring. Tatanka was awarded the victory by countout but did not win the championship because titles can only change hands as a result of pinfall or submission. Vachon attacked Sherri after the match by pulling her off the ring apron and delivery a devastating clothesline, body slam and kicks to the ribs. Tatanka had to help Sherri make it back to the dressing rooms; however, she would be attacked again at the first aid station by Vachon, who choked her, hit her head against a wall, and dropped a machine on top of her and then Vachon was arrested by security.

In the next match, The Steiner Brothers (Rick Steiner and Scott Steiner) faced The Headshrinkers (Samu and Fatu). The advantage switched back and forth several times, as the Steiners threw The Headshrinkers with several suplex variations and used their aerial abilities to attack their opponents from the ring ropes. The Headshrinkers relied mainly on using their power to wear down the Steiners. At one point, Fatu picked Rick Steiner upon his shoulders so that Samu could attack Rick from the top rope. Rick caught Samu instead and performed a bodyslam on Samu from Fatu's shoulders. The match ended when Scott Steiner performed a Frankensteiner to pin Samu and win the match.

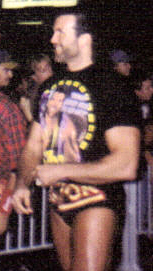
Razor Ramon dominated his match against Bob Backlund.

Crush attacked Doink the Clown outside the ring prior to the next match. After getting Doink inside the ring, Crush used his strength advantage to overpower Doink. Doink gained the advantage but missed two attacks from the top rope. Crush used more power moves to wear down Doink, and Doink tried to crawl under the ring. Crush forced Doink back into the ring and performed the Cranium Crunch, a head vice submission hold, on Doink. Doink pulled himself to the ropes and broke the hold. Doink hit the referee and knocked him unconscious; as a result of this staged ref bump, a second Doink the Clown (portrayed by Steve Keirn) was able to interfere. He hit Crush with a prosthetic arm, which enabled the first Doink to win by pinfall when the referee regained consciousness.

Razor Ramon faced Bob Backlund next. Ramon used his power to dominate the majority of the match, but Backlund used hip tosses to attempt a comeback. Ramon won the match in under four minutes by pinning Backlund with a small package.

In the following match, Money Inc. (Ted DiBiase and Irwin R. Schyster) defended their WWF Tag Team Championship against The Mega-Maniacs (Hulk Hogan and Brutus Beefcake). Beefcake wore a protective titanium facemask because of his injured face, and Hulk Hogan came to the ring with a black eye, which led the announcers to speculate about the cause. Money Inc. gained the early advantage, but DiBiase soon injured himself by hitting Beefcake's mask. Hogan and Beefcake brawled with their enemies and controlled the match until Money Inc. was counted out. Referee Earl Hebner announced, however, that he would strip them of their title if they did not return to the ring and continue the match. DiBiase returned to the ring and rendered Hogan unconscious with the Million Dollar Dream chokehold. Beefcake attacked DiBiase by applying a sleeper hold and then turned his attention to Schyster, but DiBiase hit him in the back with Schyster's briefcase. Money Inc. attacked Beefcake and removed his facemask, but Beefcake fought back and applied a sleeper hold to Schyster. The referee was accidentally knocked unconscious, and Hogan recovered and attacked both members of Money Inc. with Beefcake's facemask. He tried to make the cover for a pinfall, but the referee was still unconscious. Manager Jimmy Hart turned his jacket inside-out to reveal a striped referee jacket; he made the three-count and declared The Mega-Maniacs the winners of the match. Referee Danny Davis came to the ring and disqualified Hogan for using the facemask as a weapon. Money Inc. won the match and retained their championship, but The Mega-Maniacs threw them out of the ring and opened Schyster's briefcase to reveal stacks of cash. They celebrated in the ring and threw the money into the crowd.

Lex Luger was accompanied to the ring by four women dressed in bikinis as he prepared to face Mr. Perfect. The match began with technical wrestling, and Perfect tried to injure Luger's knee while Luger worked on Perfect's back. Perfect took control of the match with a powerslam and tried to pin Luger after performing a dropkick from the top rope. Luger's foot was on the ropes, however, so the referee halted the three-count and continued the match. Luger gained momentum and pinned Perfect; Perfect's feet were on the rope, but the referee did not see them. Luger continued to attack Perfect after the match and hit him with his forearm, which contains a steel plate as the result of a legitimate motorcycle accident. When Perfect got up, he chased Luger but was attacked by Shawn Michaels backstage.

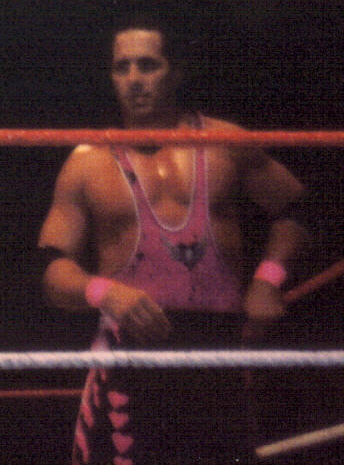
Bret Hart lost the WWF Championship to Yokozuna in the main event.

In the next match, The Undertaker faced Giant Gonzalez. Both men tried to use their size and power to control the match. Gonzalez used a reverse chinlock to wear The Undertaker down and attacked him outside the ring. The Undertaker regained control of the match and knocked Gonzalez onto his knees. Harvey Wippleman threw Gonzalez a rag soaked with chloroform, which Gonzalez used to knock The Undertaker unconscious. The referee disqualified Gonzalez for using a foreign object and awarded the match to The Undertaker. After the match, The Undertaker recovered and attacked Giant Gonzalez.

In the main event and final scheduled match on the card, Bret Hart defended the WWF Championship against Yokozuna. Hart tried to use his technical wrestling abilities against Yokozuna, while Yokozuna relied on his size advantage in the match. Hart gained control at the beginning, but Yokozuna came back with a clothesline, leg drop, and nerve hold. Hart regained the advantage when Yokozuna missed a running splash. Yokozuna applied another nerve hold but missed a running splash again. He recovered and carried Hart to the middle of the ring, but Hart removed the protective padding on the turnbuckle in the corner of the ring. He threw Yokozuna's head into the turnbuckle and applied the Sharpshooter, his signature submission hold that stretches the opponent's legs and back. Mr. Fuji, Yokozuna's manager, threw salt in Hart's eyes, which enabled Yokozuna to pin Hart and win the WWF Championship.

In an impromptu main event and the final match on the card, Hulk Hogan came to ring to check on Hart's condition. Hogan had stated during an interview earlier in the broadcast that he wanted to face the winner of the match, and Fuji challenged Hogan to face Yokozuna immediately in an impromptu bout. Hogan agreed and entered the ring. Fuji tried to throw salt in Hogan's eyes, but he missed and the salt hit Yokozuna. Hogan performed a leg drop and pinned Yokozuna to win the title in 22 seconds.

== Reception ==
The event was attended by 16,891 fans, who paid a total of $1,100,000 in admission fees. This represents less than one-third of the number of fans at WrestleMania VIII, which had an attendance of 62,167. The pay-per-view drew a 2.3 buyrate, which was lower than the previous year's 2.8 buyrate. It was higher, however, than the buyrates for any of the following four WrestleManias.

WrestleMania IX received overwhelmingly negative reviews. The event has received criticism for what some reviewers have perceived as a poorly booked event. Writing for SLAM! Wrestling, John Powell states that, aside from the Intercontinental and Tag Team Championship matches and the scantily-clad women that accompanied Lex Luger to the ring, the rest of the broadcast was poor. He is also critical of some of the outfits worn for the event, notably Jim Ross's toga and Giant Gonzalez's spray-painted suit. Reviewing the event for Online Onslaught, Adam Gutschmidt claims that several of the matches flowed poorly and had ill-conceived conclusions. He also claims that the match between Giant Gonzalez and The Undertaker was a "dud" and that Hulk Hogan's ego made the conclusion the "worst WrestleMania ending ever". RD Reynolds, owner of the website WrestleCrap, has inducted the event into the site's list of "the very worst in pro wrestling". He cites Giant Gonzalez, Papa Shango, Luger's "narcissist" gimmick, and Jim Ross wearing a toga as his reasons for including the event in the list. Many publications list WrestleMania IX as amongst the worst WrestleManias of all time, with several ranking it as the worst.

WWE places two events from WrestleMania IX in its top 50 WrestleMania moments: Bobby Heenan's entrance on the camel, which the company calls "one of the most hilarious moments in WWE history", and Hulk Hogan's title victory. Matt Anoa'i, who wrestled for WWE as Rosey, and was the brother of Roman Reigns, cousin of Yokozuna, Samu and Fatu, has identified The Headshrinkers performing a double splash on Scott Steiner at this event as his favorite moment at WrestleMania.

== Aftermath ==
A feud began between Shawn Michaels and Mr. Perfect after WrestleMania IX as a result of Michaels attacking Perfect. They faced each other at SummerSlam 1993, and Michaels won by countout after his new bodyguard, Diesel, attacked Perfect. Perfect then feuded with Diesel until leaving the WWF.

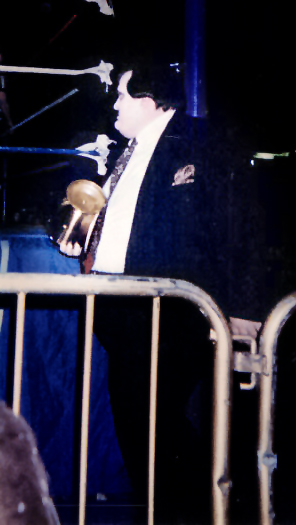
Paul Bearer was attacked by Harvey Wippleman's wrestlers.

Money Inc. lost the WWF Tag Team Championship to the Steiner Brothers on June 14, 1993. Money Inc. won the belts back in a rematch on June 16, but the Steiners won them again three days later. Money Inc. received several rematches but were unable to regain the title; they soon focused on singles competition, and DiBiase retired at the end of August.

The Undertaker continued to feud with Harvey Wippleman. On the June 12, 1993, episode of WWF Superstars of Wrestling, Wippleman, Giant Gonzalez, and Mr. Hughes attacked The Undertaker, and his manager Paul Bearer, and stole the urn that was said to be the source of his power. The Undertaker and Giant Gonzalez faced each other one final time at SummerSlam 1993 in a Rest in Peace match, in which neither wrestler could be disqualified. The Undertaker won the match to end the feud. After the match, a frustrated Gonzalez choke slammed Wippleman to the delight of the fans and turned face in the process.

Bret Hart later claimed that during a conversation with Vince McMahon, he was told that Hulk Hogan refused to drop the WWF Championship to him. However, Hulk Hogan stated that during a conversation with Vince McMahon, a deal was made for Hogan to drop the belt to the top heel at the time, Yokozuna, at the following King of the Ring. All three men eventually wound up in a meeting, where McMahon outlined the plan to have Hogan drop the belt to Yokozuna and denied telling Bret that Hogan refused to drop the championship to him.

After regaining the title, Yokozuna challenged any American athlete to bodyslam him on the deck of the USS Intrepid on July 4, 1993. After many challengers failed, Lex Luger arrived by helicopter and bodyslammed Yokozuna. Luger became a fan favorite and changed his gimmick to an American patriot. He faced Yokozuna for the WWF Championship at SummerSlam 1993; he won the match by count-out but did not win the title. Lex Luger and Bret Hart each earned a title match against Yokozuna the following year at WrestleMania X. Luger was disqualified in his match, but Hart won the championship later that night.

A documentary about Wrestlemania IX, titled Wrestlemania IX: Becoming a Spectacle, would begin streaming on Peacock on April 11, 2025. Among the details included in the documentary were issues regarding the event's controversial backstage drama.

32 years after WrestleMania IX, the event was once again held in Paradise, NV, with the 41st edition taking place at Allegiant Stadium on April 19 and 20, 2025.

According to Jim Ross, Wrestlemania IX, despite having a controversial main event, also demonstrated the weakening influence then-WWF owner Vince McMahon now had with regards to full control over the company and showed McMahon was not "the king of the world" like he once thought he was. This weakened influence was in fact greatly aided by the now continued U.S. Department of Justice investigation, with Ross alleging it was a "weird time." However, while acknowledging the major changes which occurred in the WWF in tandem with his debut at Wrestlemania IX, such as Luna Vachon now being able to use her "bizarro type" gimmick while in the WWF, "The Lone Riders" Kip Winchester and Brett Colt debuting in the company just after Wrestlemania IX under revamped Billy and Bart Gunn and being given the cowboy-themed tag team gimmick The Smoking Gunns, Bryan Clark being revamped as "Adam Bomb," and Mike Shaw, who previously wrestled in WCW as "Norman the Lunatic" after being recruited by Ross, being signed to the WWF-where he became known as "The Bastion Booger"-, Ross stated that he at that point in time was not yet head of Talent Relations and was only employed as an on-air announcer.

== Home media and streaming ==
WrestleMania IX was released on VHS by Coliseum Video and by Silver Vision in the United Kingdom. The home video included interviews with Bret Hart and Doink the Clown that hadn't been broadcast on the pay-per-view feed. The British release also included the pre-show Countdown event.

It was later released as part of the WWF's WrestleMania: The Collection (1985–1997) box set in 1997. The video was re-released six years later in March 1999. That month, it was also released as part of the WWF's WrestleMania: The Legacy box set. Highlights from the event were also included on WWE's History of WrestleMania I-IX DVD on September 14, 2004.

In the United Kingdom, the event was released on VHS on July 5, 1993. Packaged together with WrestleMania X, it was released on DVD for the WWE Tagged Classics series on May 8, 2006.

In 2014, the event was included on the WWE's streaming platform the WWE Network as part of its launch and remained on the service until the platform closed in 2026. In April 2025, WWE uploaded the event to stream freely on their WWE Vault YouTube channel.

== Results ==
No.	Results	Stipulations	Times
1^{D}	Tito Santana defeated Papa Shango	Singles match	8:00
2	Tatanka (with Sensational Sherri) defeated Shawn Michaels (c) (with Luna Vachon) by countout	Singles match for the WWF Intercontinental Championship	18:13
3	The Steiner Brothers (Rick and Scott) defeated The Headshrinkers (Samu and Fatu) (with Afa)	Tag team match	14:22
4	Doink the Clown defeated Crush	Singles match	8:28
5	Razor Ramon defeated Bob Backlund	Singles match	3:45
6	Money Inc. (Ted DiBiase and Irwin R. Schyster) (c) defeated The Mega-Maniacs (Hulk Hogan and Brutus Beefcake) (with Jimmy Hart) by disqualification	Tag team match for the WWF Tag Team Championship	18:27
7	Lex Luger defeated Mr. Perfect	Singles match	10:56
8	The Undertaker (with Paul Bearer) defeated Giant González (with Harvey Wippleman) by disqualification	Singles match	7:33
9	Yokozuna (with Mr. Fuji) defeated Bret Hart (c)	Singles match for the WWF Championship	8:55
10	Hulk Hogan defeated Yokozuna (c) (with Mr. Fuji)	Singles match for the WWF Championship	0:22
(c) / – the champion(s) heading into the match; D / – this was a dark match
