= Mega-Maniacs =

Professional wrestling tag team

Tag team
- Members: Hulk Hogan; Brutus Beefcake; Jimmy Hart (manager)
- Name(s): Boulder Brothers; Mega-Maniacs
- Billed heights: Hogan: 6 ft 7 in (2.01 m); Beefcake: 6 ft 4 in (1.93 m)
- Combined billed weight: 575 lb (261 kg; 41.1 st); Hogan: 303 lb (137 kg; 21.6 st); Beefcake: 272 lb (123 kg; 19.4 st)
- Debut: 1989
- Disbanded: 1998
- Years active: 1989-1998

The Mega-Maniacs was the tag team of Hulk Hogan and Brutus "The Barber" Beefcake who had two distinct runs as a team in the World Wrestling Federation, one in 1989 and another one in 1993.

== History ==
=== Continental Wrestling Association (1979) ===
Hulk Hogan and Brutus Beefcake began their careers more or less at the same time, quickly becoming lifelong friends and teaming up from time to time. Their most well known "Pre-WWF" teams were as "Terry & Ed Boulder" and as "Hulk & Dizzy Hogan", billed as brothers. In 1979, they wrestled for Jerry Jarrett's Memphis-based promotion Continental Wrestling Association (CWA) as the Boulder Brothers, Eddie Boulder and Terry Boulder.

=== World Wrestling Federation (1989-1990, 1993) ===
==== Feud with Randy Savage (1989) ====
During the summer of 1989, Tiny Lister began appearing at WWF arena shows, playing his character, "The Human Wrecking Machine" Zeus, from the WWF-financed film No Holds Barred; Zeus began targeting Hogan, the movie's top-billed star. Zeus teamed up with "Macho Man" Randy Savage in hopes of destroying Hulk Hogan. Faced with overwhelming odds, Hulk Hogan turned to his best friend Brutus Beefcake, who was already feuding with Savage at the time, to even the odds.

At SummerSlam 1989, Hulk Hogan and Brutus Beefcake teamed up to take on Randy Savage and Zeus in the main event, a clash that saw Hulk Hogan pin Zeus after his trademark Leg drop. Hogan and Beefcake once again teamed up after being attacked in the locker rooms during the closing moments of the 1989 Survivor Series by Savage and Zeus.

It was decided that the feud had to be settled in a steel cage match, which was featured on a "Mini-PPV" as a double feature with the movie "No Holds Barred." (The match was taped December 13, 1989, and aired two weeks later on pay-per-view.) Hulk Hogan and Brutus Beefcake were successful in the cage, after which Zeus was not seen in the WWF. After the steel cage match, Hulk Hogan and Brutus Beefcake both went back to working singles matches.

In February and March 1990 they wrestled in house show matches where they defeated Mr. Perfect and The Genius.

==== Feud with Money Inc. (1993) ====
In July 1990, Brutus Beefcake suffered a devastating face injury during a parasailing accident that forced him to temporarily retire from in-ring competition. After an aborted comeback attempt in late 1991/early 1992, Brutus Beefcake finally felt he was ready to get back inside the squared circle in 1993.

On February 1, 1993 (shown on Television February 15), Brutus Beefcake faced off against "The Million Dollar Man" Ted DiBiase with his Money Inc. partner I.R.S. and manager Jimmy Hart at ringside. I.R.S. interfered in the match with Money, Inc. double teaming Beefcake, even going so far as to hitting him in his surgically reconstructed face with a metal briefcase. The actions of Money Inc. were so horrible, that even longtime heel manager Jimmy Hart took objection to it and tried to protect Beefcake from further harm.

At this point in time, Hulk Hogan was not active in the WWF, having gone into semi-retirement a year earlier, but the attack on his lifelong friend brought Hogan back to the WWF. With newly turned babyface manager Jimmy Hart at their side, Hulk Hogan and Brutus Beefcake joined forces, swore vengeance on Money, Inc. and then officially named themselves "The Mega-Maniacs."

Due to the attack by Money, Inc, Beefcake took to wearing a red and yellow protective facemask when competing in the ring and Brutus's entire outfit changed to red and yellow as a show of unity with Hulk Hogan.

Leading up to WrestleMania IX, the Mega-Maniacs took on the Beverly Brothers during house shows to get ready for their shot at the WWF Tag Team Championship at WrestleMania. The Mega-Maniacs were not successful in their challenge as they lost to Money Inc. via disqualification when Hogan attacked the champions with Beefcake's steel face plate. Later in the night, Hogan would win the WWF Championship in an impromptu match against Yokozuna, when Yokozuna challenged Hogan to a match immediately after winning the title from Bret Hart the same night.

The Mega-Maniacs took on Money, Inc. several times during the months of April and May on the house show circuit with the World Champion not defending his title once. Hogan eventually lost the title to Yokozuna at June's King of the Ring pay-per-view, and both he and Beefcake left the WWF soon after.

=== World Championship Wrestling (1994-1998) ===
Hogan and Beefcake, now known as "Brother Bruti," came to WCW together in June 1994. Bruti eventually turned on Hogan at Halloween Havoc 1994, and the two feuded on and off for the next year and a half, with Bruti becoming "The Butcher" and "Zodiac." Savage aided Hogan, while Butcher/Zodiac aligned with Kevin Sullivan and Avalanche and joined Sullivan's Dungeon of Doom stable.

Zodiac turned face in 1996, revealing himself to be a mole that Hogan and Savage had injected into the Dungeon of Doom a year earlier, becoming The Booty Man. Hogan, Savage, and Booty Man continued to team against members of the Dungeon.

In July 1996, Hogan shocked the fans by turning heel and starting a new faction known as the New World Order. Booty Man attempted to join the group until Hogan ordered his fellow nWo members Scott Hall and Kevin Nash to attack him.

Less than a year later, Booty Man, now known as The Disciple, joined the group and always accompany Hogan to the ring and aide him in winning matches. In 1998, The Warrior came to WCW to feud with Hogan and turned the Disciple against Hogan, joining the One Warrior Nation (or oWn, a play on the nWo acronym). Hogan and Leslie never teamed again after this.
