= El Colorado =

Coordinates: 26°18′S 59°22′W

- Interactive map of El Colorado
- Country: Argentina
- Province: Formosa Province
- Time zone: UTC−3 (ART)
- Climate: Cfa

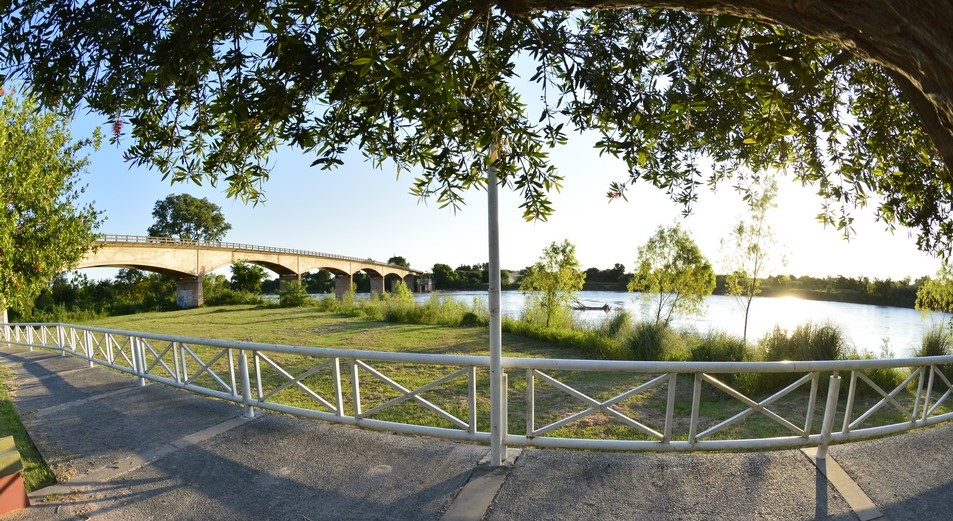
El Colorado

El Colorado is a settlement in northern Argentina. It is located in Formosa Province.

== Notable people ==
- Giant Gonzalez, former professional wrestler
