= SummerSlam (1993) =

World Wrestling Federation pay-per-view event

- Promotional poster featuring Yokozuna
- Promotion: World Wrestling Federation
- Date: August 30, 1993
- City: Auburn Hills, Michigan
- Venue: The Palace of Auburn Hills
- Attendance: 23,954
- Buy rate: 250,000
- Tagline(s): Fat Chance! Somebody Has to Stop Him!

Pay-per-view chronology
← Previous; King of the Ring	Next → Survivor Series

SummerSlam chronology
← Previous; 1992	Next → 1994

The 1993 SummerSlam was a professional wrestling pay-per-view (PPV) event produced by the World Wrestling Federation (WWF, renamed WWE in 2002). It was the sixth annual SummerSlam and took place on Monday, August 30, 1993, at The Palace of Auburn Hills in Auburn Hills, Michigan and featured 10 televised matches.

All three of the WWF's then-active championships were defended at the event. The main event saw Lex Luger challenge Yokozuna for the WWF Championship. On the undercard, The Steiner Brothers (Rick Steiner and Scott Steiner) defended the WWF Tag Team Championship against The Heavenly Bodies (Jimmy Del Ray and Tom Prichard), and Shawn Michaels defended the WWF Intercontinental Championship against Mr. Perfect. In addition to the title matches, Bret Hart and Jerry Lawler were scheduled to wrestle to settle their feud and determine who would be named "Undisputed King of the World Wrestling Federation".

The event received generally mixed reviews, with many of the matches being viewed as generally average, though the WWF Tag Team Championship match was positively received. Conversely, much like their first encounter, the Rest in Peace match between The Undertaker and Giant Gonzalez was widely panned.

== Production ==
=== Background ===
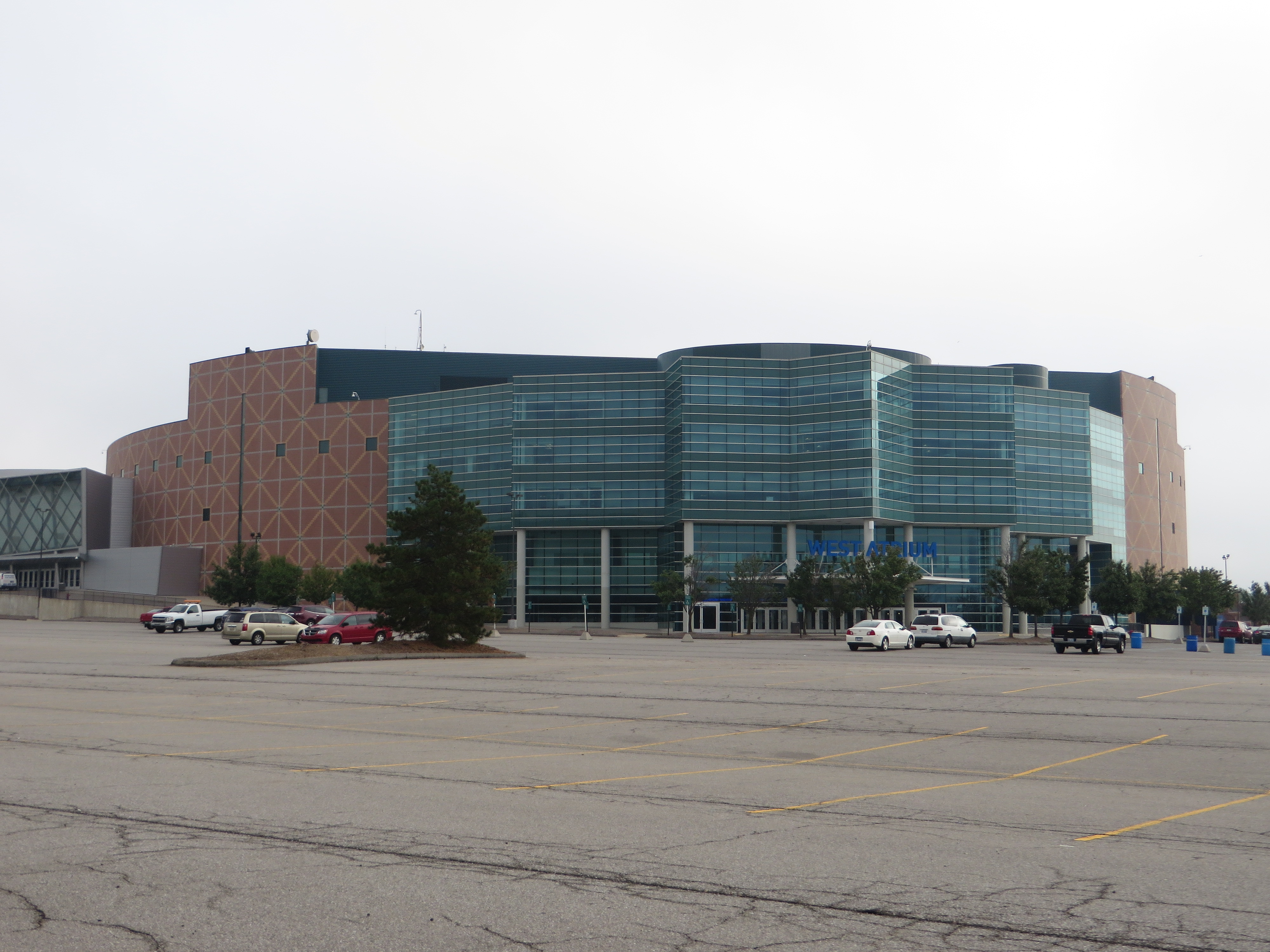
The sixth annual SummerSlam was held at The Palace of Auburn Hills in Auburn Hills, Michigan.

SummerSlam is an annual professional wrestling pay-per-view (PPV) event produced every August by the World Wrestling Federation (WWF, renamed WWE in 2002) since 1988. Dubbed "The Biggest Party of the Summer", it is one of the promotion's original four PPVs, along with WrestleMania, Royal Rumble, and Survivor Series, referred to as the "Big Four", and one of the "Big Five", along with King of the Ring that was established in June 1993. It has since been considered the WWF's second biggest event of the year behind WrestleMania. The sixth SummerSlam was scheduled for Monday, August 30, 1993, at The Palace of Auburn Hills in Auburn Hills, Michigan.

=== Storylines ===
Two of the matches at SummerSlam 1993 were a result of Razor Ramon's loss to The Kid (later the 1-2-3 Kid) on the May 17, 1993 edition of Monday Night Raw. Following Ramon's loss to the newcomer, Money Inc. (Ted DiBiase and Irwin R. Schyster) teased Ramon about the match. DiBiase offered Ramon a job as a servant, which Ramon angrily refused. Ramon began teaming with the 1-2-3 Kid for a series of matches against Money Inc. DiBiase asked for a singles match against the Kid, and the Kid accepted the challenge. Ramon helped the Kid win the match by distracting DiBiase. It was decided that the feuds would be settled in two singles matches at SummerSlam, with Ramon facing DiBiase and Schyster facing the 1-2-3 Kid.

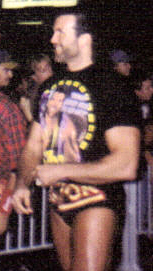
Razor Ramon was feuding with Ted DiBiase and I.R.S. heading into SummerSlam.

The match between the Steiner Brothers and The Heavenly Bodies received little buildup. The Bodies were a successful tag team in Jim Cornette's Smoky Mountain Wrestling, and an interpromotional agreement allowed them to challenge for the WWF Tag Team Championship.

The rivalry between Shawn Michaels and Mr. Perfect began at WrestleMania IX. During a fight after the match between Lex Luger and Mr. Perfect, Shawn Michaels appeared and attacked Perfect. Mr. Perfect gained revenge by distracting Michaels at the May 17, 1993 edition of Monday Night Raw, allowing Marty Jannetty to pin Michaels and win the WWF Intercontinental Championship. Michaels regained the belt the following month with the help of his new bodyguard, Diesel.

Bret Hart and Jerry Lawler had a heated feud, stemming from Lawler interrupting Hart's victory ceremony at the 1993 King of the Ring tournament. Lawler insisted that he was the true king of the WWF and attacked Hart. The feud intensified as Lawler taunted and attacked Bret's family, including his parents and his younger brother Owen.

According to a story relayed by Bret Hart on the TSN sports show Off The Record, Hart was originally supposed to wrestle Hulk Hogan for the WWF World Heavyweight Championship. From Hart's explanation of matters, the reason the match did not happen was because Hogan changed his mind, as he was supposedly not happy with the planned finish. As a result, Hogan lost the belt to Yokozuna at King of the Ring 1993 instead. However, this has never been officially explained by WWE (then WWF), and is part of Professional Wrestling lore on the Internet. Eventually Bret Hart and Yokozuna would have a rematch at WrestleMania X, where Hart's storyline loss of the title was avenged, when he beat Yokozuna to start his second reign as WWF Champion.

Marty Jannetty was originally supposed to face Rick Martel, but Ludvig Borga replaced Martel well before the match. The match received little buildup, although Borga appeared in several vignettes leading up to the match. He criticized the United States for such reasons as its pollution. Jannetty vowed to defend America's pride in his match against Borga.

The buildup for the match between Giant Gonzalez and The Undertaker began after the Undertaker defeated Kamala in a Coffin match at Survivor Series 1992. Kamala's manager Harvey Wippleman vowed revenge and introduced Gonzalez at Royal Rumble 1993, with Gonzalez attacking and eliminating the Undertaker. Gonzalez and the Undertaker wrestled at WrestleMania IX, and Gonzalez knocked the Undertaker unconscious with a chloroform-soaked rag. The feud intensified when Wippleman, Gonzalez and Mr. Hughes attacked the Undertaker and his manager, Paul Bearer. They stole the urn, the supposed source of the Undertaker's strength, and used it to assault Paul Bearer, who was not seen again until SummerSlam. The feud came to a head at SummerSlam in a Rest In Peace match.

The six-man match at SummerSlam was originally supposed to be a mixed tag-team match between the team of Tatanka and Sherri Martel and the team of Bam Bam Bigelow and Luna Vachon. However, Luna broke her arm and Sherri left the WWF in July 1993, however, forcing the WWF to change the match. Two reasons have been given for Sherri's departure: her decision to enroll in cosmetology school and failed drug tests. As a result, Tatanka teamed with The Smoking Gunns and Bigelow teamed with The Headshrinkers. The Gunns and Headshrinkers were rivals in the tag team division but had no real storyline. The feud between Bigelow and Tatanka originated when Tatanka came to the help of Sherri, who had interrupted an interview with Bigelow. Subsequently, Bigelow ambushed Tatanka and cut some of the hair Tatanka had dyed red as a tribute to his Lumbee heritage.

Lex Luger's rivalry with Yokozuna began on July 4 at the Yokozuna Bodyslam Challenge on the deck of the USS Intrepid. After several wrestlers and other athletes attempted to body slam Yokozuna, Luger arrived in a helicopter. He was able to body slam Yokozuna, which led to a title shot at SummerSlam. To build support for Luger, the WWF had him ride across the country in a bus named the Lex Express. Yokozuna's spokesperson, Jim Cornette, agreed to the match, but he made Lex Luger agree to two conditions. Luger would not receive a rematch if he lost, and he had to wear protective padding over the steel plate in his forearm.

== Event ==
Other on-screen personnel
Role:	Name:
Commentators	Vince McMahon
Commentators	Bobby Heenan
Commentators	Jim Ross (Radio WWF)
Commentators	Gorilla Monsoon (Radio WWF)
Interviewers	Todd Pettengill
Interviewers	Joe Fowler
Ring announcer	Howard Finkel
Referees	Earl Hebner
Referees	Danny Davis
Referees	Joey Marella
Referees	Tim White
Referees	Bill Alfonso
Master of ceremonies	Macho Man Randy Savage

The pay-per-view took place in front of a crowd of 23,954 at the Palace of Auburn Hills.

Before the event aired on PPV, "The Rocket" Owen Hart defeated longtime jobber Barry Horowitz in a dark match.

The first televised match was Razor Ramon versus Ted DiBiase. DiBiase attacked Ramon before the match began, but Ramon quickly turned the match around with several clotheslines. DiBiase regained control before untying a turnbuckle cover. Ramon won the match after ramming DiBiase's head into the exposed turnbuckle and using the Razor's Edge to get the pin.

The Steiner Brothers were the audience favorites in the WWF Tag Team Championship match, as they were defending the belts in their hometown. Before the match began, The Heavenly Bodies attacked them. When the match began, the Bodies executed several double-team maneuvers on Rick Steiner. Scott tagged in and took control of the match. The Bodies soon regained the advantage, and manager Jim Cornette got involved by hitting Scott in the throat with a tennis racket. Rick tagged back in and hit several Steiner-Lines before Prichard attacked him with Cornette's tennis racket. Del Ray accidentally hit Prichard with a moonsault, however, allowing Scott to hit a Frankensteiner and Rick to get the pin.

The match between Shawn Michaels and Mr. Perfect began with a series of wrestling holds. The match remained primarily technical until Diesel distracted Perfect, allowing Michaels to superkick him in the face. Michaels worked on Perfect's injured back until Perfect took control of the match. After a series of attacks on Michaels, Perfect used the Perfect Plex. Diesel pulled him out of the ring and threw him into the steel ring steps, however, allowing Michaels to win by countout.

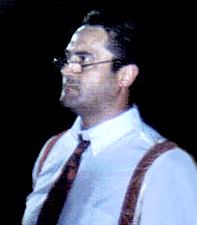
Irwin R. Schyster had little trouble defeating the 1-2-3 Kid.

Irwin R. Schyster remained in control for the majority of his match against the 1-2-3 Kid. Although the Kid hit several kicks, Schyster regained control every time. Schyster used his usual abdominal stretch while using the ring ropes for leverage before the Kid made a brief comeback by hitting a moonsault. Schyster hit a Write Off, however, and got the pin.

Bret Hart came to the ring for his match with Jerry Lawler. Lawler, however, appeared on crutches and claimed that he had been injured in a car accident. He announced that his court jester, Doink the Clown (portrayed by Matt Osborne), would wrestle Hart in his place. Doink threw a bucket of water on Bret's brother, Bruce Hart, prompting Bret to attack Doink outside of the ring. The match consisted of angry brawling until Doink slowed the pace with a couple of submission holds. After Doink missed a Whoopie Cushion attempt, Bret took full control of the match and locked Doink in the Sharpshooter. With Doink in the sharpshooter, Lawler then attacked Bret with a crutch, revealing that he was not injured and thus causing an unofficial disqualification (no official announcement was made). WWF President Jack Tunney came to the ring and had Howard Finkel announce that Lawler would be given a lifetime ban if he refused to compete in the scheduled match. The match between Lawler and Hart consisted almost exclusively of brawling. The two attacked each other with a milk pail and crutches and traded punches and kicks. Bret used Lawler's signature move, the piledriver, before putting him in the Sharpshooter. Lawler submitted, but Bret refused to release him for three and a half minutes. The referee then reversed his decision and gave the victory and title of "Undisputed King of the World Wrestling Federation" to Lawler.

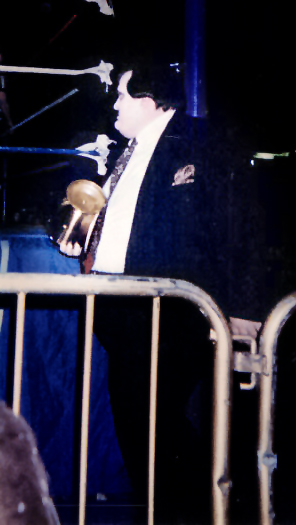
Paul Bearer made a surprise return to help The Undertaker defeat Giant Gonzalez.

Ludvig Borga dominated the majority of a squash match against Marty Jannetty. He attacked Jannetty immediately with a series of punches and knees. Jannetty managed a couple of brief comebacks but was unable to mount a serious offense. Borga used his strength to control the match and won the match by submission with a backbreaker.

Harvey Wippleman was at ringside with the urn as the Undertaker faced Giant Gonzalez. The two wrestlers brawled, using the ring steps and steel chairs. Halfway through the match, Paul Bearer appeared, carrying a black wreath. He attacked Wippleman and took back the urn. The Undertaker quickly took control of the match, attacking Gonzalez with a flying clothesline to win by pinfall. After the match, Gonzalez turned on Wippleman and attacked him with a chokeslam.

The next match on the card was the six-man tag team match. The Headshrinkers' manager Afa interfered by attacking Billy Gunn outside the ring. At one point, Tatanka looked like he was gaining control, as he began his usual war dance. Bigelow kicked him in the back of the head, however, to end his momentum. Near the end of the match, Bigelow and the Headshrinkers each climbed the turnbuckles to attempt simultaneous diving headbutts, but Tatanka rolled out of the way. Tatanka seized the opportunity and pinned Samu for the win.

Before the main event, Kiotika Suzuki sang the Japanese national anthem. Akio Sato, formerly a member of The Orient Express, was the flag bearer for Yokozuna. Randy Savage then introduced Aaron Neville, who sang the American anthem.

The main event began with a stare down. Luger gained the early advantage and managed to knock Yokozuna down by kicking the ring ropes into Yokozuna's groin. Luger tried to bodyslam Yokozuna, but the sumo wrestler's weight was too much. Yokozuna knocked him out of the ring and choked him. Yokozuna had his manager, Mr. Fuji, throw him a salt bucket, which he used to attack Luger. Yokozuna wore Luger down, and after a brief comeback by the all-American, hit a leg drop on Luger and pulled him to the corner for a Banzai Drop. After Yokozuna missed, Luger succeeded in bodyslamming Yokozuna, and he attacked Mr. Fuji when the manager tried to get involved. Luger knocked Yokozuna out of the ring with a forearm smash, and followed this up by attacking Jim Cornette. Yokozuna was counted out, but he retained the title because championships only change hands only by pinfall or submission. Several faces came to the ring to celebrate with Luger as red, white and blue balloons fell from the ceiling to celebrate the victory.

== Reception ==
The event overall received mixed reviews, with several reviews noting the majority of the matches as being fairly average.

Reviewing for TJR Wrestling, John Canton gave the event an overall score of 4 out of 10. He criticized the amount of disqualification victories present in the event, though noted the event as "better then I remembered", due to the present of more average matches in quality. Whilst he gave many matches average scores, he was positive towards the Tag Team Championship bout and the match between Smoking Gunns and The Headshrinkers, which both received scores of 3.25 stars. For the former, calling it a "fun tag team match... with four good workers who worked well together" though he wished it got more time. For the latter, Canton called the match "good" with an exciting pace, though he admitted that since they were following the weakest events of the night, "A nap would [have been] more exciting than that." Overall, he described SummerSlam 1993 as a poorly booked event, stating that the event needed more "decisive finishes."

Steve Cook, writing for 411Mania, was slightly more positive, giving the event a score of 5.5, indicating "Not So Good".

The Rest In Peace Match, much like their first encounter at WrestleMania IX earlier that year, between The Undertaker and Giant Gonzalez was widely panned. Canton savaged the match was a negative two star rating, calling Gonzalez "maybe the worst wrestler ever" and describing his offense as "painful" to watch. He also criticized the poor finish to the match, and the lack of weapon usage from The Undertaker. Cook echoed his displeasure with the event, giving it zero stars.

== Aftermath ==
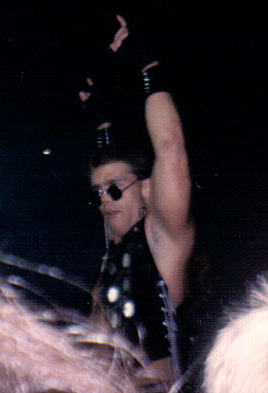
Shawn Michaels was stripped of the Intercontinental Championship in fall 1993.

The SummerSlam match was DiBiase's final appearance as a WWF wrestler. He injured his neck and back in January 1994 and was forced to retire from wrestling. Meanwhile, Ramon received a push in Fall 1993 that led to the first of four Intercontinental championships.

The Heavenly Bodies did not become serious contenders to the tag team title, and the Steiners soon began a feud with The Quebecers, a new team in the WWF.

Shawn Michaels was suspended in late 1993 and forced to vacate the Intercontinental Championship, while Mr. Perfect began a feud with Diesel. The WWF planned to have Perfect and Diesel face each other as part of an elimination match at Survivor Series 1993, but Mr. Perfect was replaced by Randy Savage at the last minute. Mr. Perfect would not wrestle another pay per view match for the company until Royal Rumble 2002.

The match between Hart and Doink was significant for a couple of reasons. It marked Doink's final match as a heel, as he turned on Jerry Lawler shortly after the match. In addition, Matt Osborne, who had portrayed Doink since the character's creation, was fired that fall because of drug problems.

The feud between Jerry Lawler and Bret Hart remained unsettled and led to several storylines over the next two years. The final pay per view event featuring this feud was SummerSlam 1995, which saw Hart beat Lawler's "dentist" Isaac Yankem, D.D.S.

Borga received a main event push after his SummerSlam match. After the event, he confronted Luger in the locker room. This began a feud that led to a match between the All-Americans and Foreign Fanatics at Survivor Series 1993.

Luger continued to work as a main event wrestler, although he never won the WWF World Heavyweight Championship. He competed in another match with Yokozuna at WrestleMania X after co-winning the 1994 Royal Rumble but was again unsuccessful in taking the belt from Yokozuna.

30 years later, in 2023, SummerSlam returned to the state and was held in nearby Ford Field in Detroit.

== Home media and streaming ==
The event was released on VHS by Coliseum Video in the United States and by Silver Vision in the United Kingdom. The UK version of the tape also includes the pre-show "Countdown" event. Both versions of the tape include previously unaired segments and interviews, including a post match interview with the Hart family, an interview with Jim Cornette, and Mr Perfect attacking Diesel.

In October 2005, it was re-released on DVD in the United Kingdom as part of Silver Vision's Tagged Classics range, and was paired with SummerSlam 1992. This DVD set was not released in the USA.

In 2014, the event was included on the WWE's streaming platform the WWE Network as part of its launch and remained on the service until the platform closed. As of October 2026, subscribers in multiple territories, including the US, Canada and the UK, can stream the event on Netflix, thanks to the WWE's ten-year agreement with the company.

== Results ==
No.	Results	Stipulations	Times
1^{D}	Owen Hart defeated Barry Horowitz	Singles match	8:32
2	Razor Ramon defeated Ted DiBiase	Singles match	7:32
3	The Steiner Brothers (Rick and Scott) (c) defeated The Heavenly Bodies (Jimmy Del Ray and Tom Prichard) (with Jim Cornette)	Tag team match for the WWF Tag Team Championship	9:28
4	Shawn Michaels (c) (with Diesel) defeated Mr. Perfect by countout	Singles match for the WWF Intercontinental Championship	11:20
5	Irwin R. Schyster defeated The 1-2-3 Kid	Singles match	5:44
6	Bret Hart defeated Doink the Clown (with Jerry Lawler) by disqualification	Singles match	9:05
7	Jerry Lawler defeated Bret Hart by disqualification	Singles match	6:32
8	Ludvig Borga defeated Marty Jannetty by submission	Singles match	5:15
9	The Undertaker (with Paul Bearer) defeated Giant Gonzalez (with Harvey Wippleman)	Rest in Peace match	8:04
10	Tatanka and The Smoking Gunns (Billy and Bart) defeated Bam Bam Bigelow and The Headshrinkers (Samu and Fatu) (with Luna Vachon and Afa)	Six-man tag team match	11:15
11	Lex Luger defeated Yokozuna (c) (with Mr. Fuji and Jim Cornette) by countout	Singles match for the WWF Championship; Luger had to wear protective padding over his forearm, and this was billed as Luger's only WWF Championship match while Yokozuna was champion.	17:58
(c) / – the champion(s) heading into the match; D / – this was a dark match
