= Jorge González (wrestler) =

Argentina athlete and actor (1966–2010)

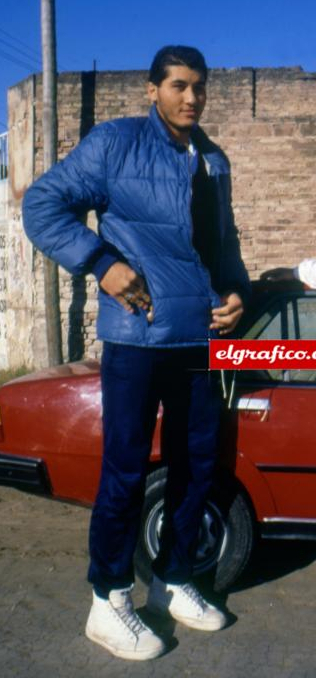
- González in 1988

Personal information
- Born: 31 January 1966 El Colorado, Formosa, Argentina
- Died: 22 September 2010 (aged 44) San Martín, Chaco, Argentina
- Cause of death: Type 1 Diabetes

Professional wrestling career
- Ring name(s): El Gigante; Giant Gonzalez; El Yeti
- Billed height: 8 ft 0 in (244 cm)
- Billed weight: 460 lb (209 kg)
- Billed from: The Andes Mountains; Argentina
- Trained by: WCW Power Plant
- Debut: 1990
- Retired: 1996

Jorge González (31 January 1966 – 22 September 2010) was an Argentine professional wrestler, basketball player and actor best known for his appearances in World Championship Wrestling under the ring name El Gigante and in the World Wrestling Federation under the ring name Giant Gonzalez. González remains the tallest man to have competed for both companies and the tallest Argentinian to have ever lived.

== Early life ==
Jorge González was born in El Colorado, Formosa, Argentina on 31 January 1966. González suffered from gigantism.

== Basketball career ==
González was billed as being 8 ft 0 in (2.44 m), making him the tallest WWE wrestler and Argentine basketball player in history; his true height was 2.31 m (7 ft 7 in), which still made him the tallest in wrestling and a tie for first place in basketball. He started his career with the youths of Hindú Club de Resistencia at the age of 16, standing 2.19 m (7 ft 2 in) tall. Subsequently, León Najnudel, then coach of the Argentine national team, recommended the board of Gimnasia y Esgrima La Plata to sign the player for the team's Argentine second division roster. During 1986, González helped Gimnasia achieve promotion to the Argentine first division. He then signed for Sport Club Cañadense, but saw little action due to an injury that left him off the court for nine months.

=== National team ===
León Najnudel included González in the Argentine national team that took part in the 1985 South American Basketball Championship (bronze medal) and the 1988 Tournament of the Americas (5th place), where he attracted the attention of the Atlanta Hawks' scouts.

=== NBA career ===
González took part in the 1988 NBA draft, being chosen by the Atlanta Hawks in the third round (#54 selection). Along with Hernán Montenegro (drafted #57), they became the first Argentine players drafted in the NBA. The Hawks bought the player's rights from his Argentine team for a 30,000 Argentine australes fee. However, he was unable to adapt to the physical demands of NBA basketball, partly due to a serious knee injury.

== Professional wrestling career ==
=== World Championship Wrestling (1988–1992) ===
In 1988, Hawks owner Ted Turner offered González a job as a professional wrestler in World Championship Wrestling (WCW), which Turner also owned. After over a year of training, González was introduced to fans as El Gigante on 19 May 1990 at the pay-per-view Capital Combat. Wearing shorts, he competed as a fan favorite and was billed as being close to eight feet tall.

Over the next two years, he feuded with Ric Flair for the WCW World Heavyweight Championship, participated in a Chamber of Horrors match in 1991 and also had a date on TBS with Missy Hyatt. He also participated in a feud with Sid Vicious who stood 6 ft 9 in and One Man Gang who stood at 6 feet 7 inches (2.01 m). The point of the feud was to determine who the real "giant of WCW" was. He also had a cross promotional stint in the New Japan Pro-Wrestling (NJPW) promotion before signing with the World Wrestling Federation (WWF) in 1993.

According to Ron Reis, Gonzalez was set to make a return to the company at their 1995 pay-per-view Halloween Havoc in the role of "The Yeti", an insurance policy put in place to make sure Hulk Hogan did not retain the WCW Championship against The Giant. The plan behind his return was to set up an idea by Kevin Sullivan (who was the booker of the promotion at the time) had for the pay-per-view World War 3 the following month. It would be a three ring, 60 man, and over the top rope battle royal, with a giant occupying each of the three rings. But the idea fell through as González had a diabetic attack during preparation for his return at the Halloween Havoc pay-per-view leading him to having to be flown back to his birth country Argentina immediately, and Ron Reis had to take his spot in the role.

=== World Wrestling Federation (1993) ===
González (left) performing at Wrestlemania IX against The Undertaker in 1993

González competed as Giant Gonzalez during his time in the WWF. González grew a beard and wore a full body suit that featured airbrushed muscles with bushy hair attached. He was introduced at the Royal Rumble in January 1993, where he eliminated Harvey Wippleman's nemesis The Undertaker from the Royal Rumble match despite not being an official participant. At WrestleMania IX, González lost to The Undertaker by disqualification after he knocked out the Undertaker using chloroform. After another loss to The Undertaker at SummerSlam, the feud came to an end, and after the match, Wippleman berated him, before González turned on Wippleman himself, turning face in the process. He lost to Randy Savage on WWF on TSN on 1 September.

The foundation was later set for a feud between González and Adam Bomb, but it never truly began. His last appearance in WWF was on 4 October episode of Monday Night Raw in a 20-man battle royal match for the Intercontinental Championship. After the match was started, González was the first eliminated by "Macho Man" Randy Savage, Diesel, Bastion Booger, 1-2-3 Kid, Marty Jannetty, Adam Bomb, and Bam Bam Bigelow. Three days later, WWF announced that González left the company after his WWF contract had expired on 7 October 1993.

=== New Japan Pro-Wrestling and WAR (1994–1995) ===
After his departure from the WWF, González wrestled in the Japanese promotions NJPW and WAR (Wrestle and Romance) until his retirement from wrestling, and used his old ring name El Gigante. His last singles match was on 8 February 1995, when he lost to The Great Muta. On 8 December 1995, González wrestled his final match, teaming with Kōji Kitao in a loss to Shinja and Typhoon by countout.

== Acting career ==
González played the role of Manny, a carnival sideshow giant in a 1993 episode of Baywatch, who befriends Hobie, but later falls into the water and his large size makes it difficult to be rescued. González also had roles in the 1993 and 1994 Thunder in Paradise double-episode turned movies. In 1994 González made a short appearance as Eryx the Boxer in Hercules in the Underworld, a television prequel film from the television series Hercules: The Legendary Journeys.

== Personal life and death ==
In January 1996, González retired from professional wrestling due to serious health issues and returned home to Argentina.

After his retirement from wrestling, González lived on a ranch in Argentina in his later years. His former manager Harvey Wippleman would send his own money to maintain González and his family. In October 2009, he began using a wheelchair, and also had to use a dialysis machine due to his failing kidneys. The Argentine Basketball Federation also helped Gonzalez with finances in his final years, including donations of appliances for his house, clothes and medicine. González was married and had one step-daughter.

=== Death ===
González died due to complications from diabetes type 1 and heart issues on 22 September 2010, in his hometown of San Martin, Argentina at the age of 44.

== Legacy ==
In the years since González's death, he has often been criticized for his lack of wrestling ability. Mark Calaway revealed that he once shot on González for being careless in the ring and that his feud with González "took years off (Calaway's) career".

== Filmography ==
| Year | Title | Role | Notes |
|---|---|---|---|
| 1992 | Swamp Thing | M'tama | Episode: "This Old House of Mayan" |
| 1993 | Thunder in Paradise | Terremoto | |
| 1993 | Baywatch | Manny/Pelican Man | Episode: "Blindside" |
| 1993 | Thunder in Paradise | Mortador / Terremoto | 4 episodes |
| 1994 | Hercules in the Underworld | Eryx the Boxer | Television film |
| 1994 | Thunder in Paradise II | Mortador | |

== Championships and accomplishments ==
- Pro Wrestling Illustrated
  - PWI ranked him No. 112 of the 500 best singles wrestlers in the PWI 500 in 1991
  - PWI ranked him No. 498 of the top 500 singles wrestlers of the PWI Years in 1993
- Wrestling Observer Newsletter
  - Worst Feud of the Year (1993) vs. The Undertaker

== See also ==
- List of premature professional wrestling deaths
- List of tallest people
