= Money Inc. =

Professional wrestling tag team

Tag team
- Name(s): Money Inc. Money Incorporated
- Members: Ted DiBiase; Irwin R. Schyster
- Manager: Jimmy Hart
- Billed heights: DiBiase: 6 ft 3 in (1.91 m); Schyster: 6 ft 2 in (1.88 m)
- Combined billed weight: 508 lb (230 kg)
- Debut: February 7, 1992
- Disbanded: August 30, 1993

Money Inc. was a professional wrestling tag team in the World Wrestling Federation (WWF) from February 1992 to August 1993. The team consisted of "Million Dollar Man" Ted DiBiase and Irwin R. Schyster (I.R.S.). They held the WWF Tag Team Championship three times, defeating the Legion of Doom, The Natural Disasters and the Steiner Brothers for the title. In addition they had a feud with the Mega-Maniacs (Hulk Hogan and Brutus Beefcake). After Money Inc. split up, DiBiase and Schyster were reunited in two stables, the Million Dollar Corporation and the New World Order, and have made several television appearances during special episodes of Raw.

== Career ==
=== Formation ===
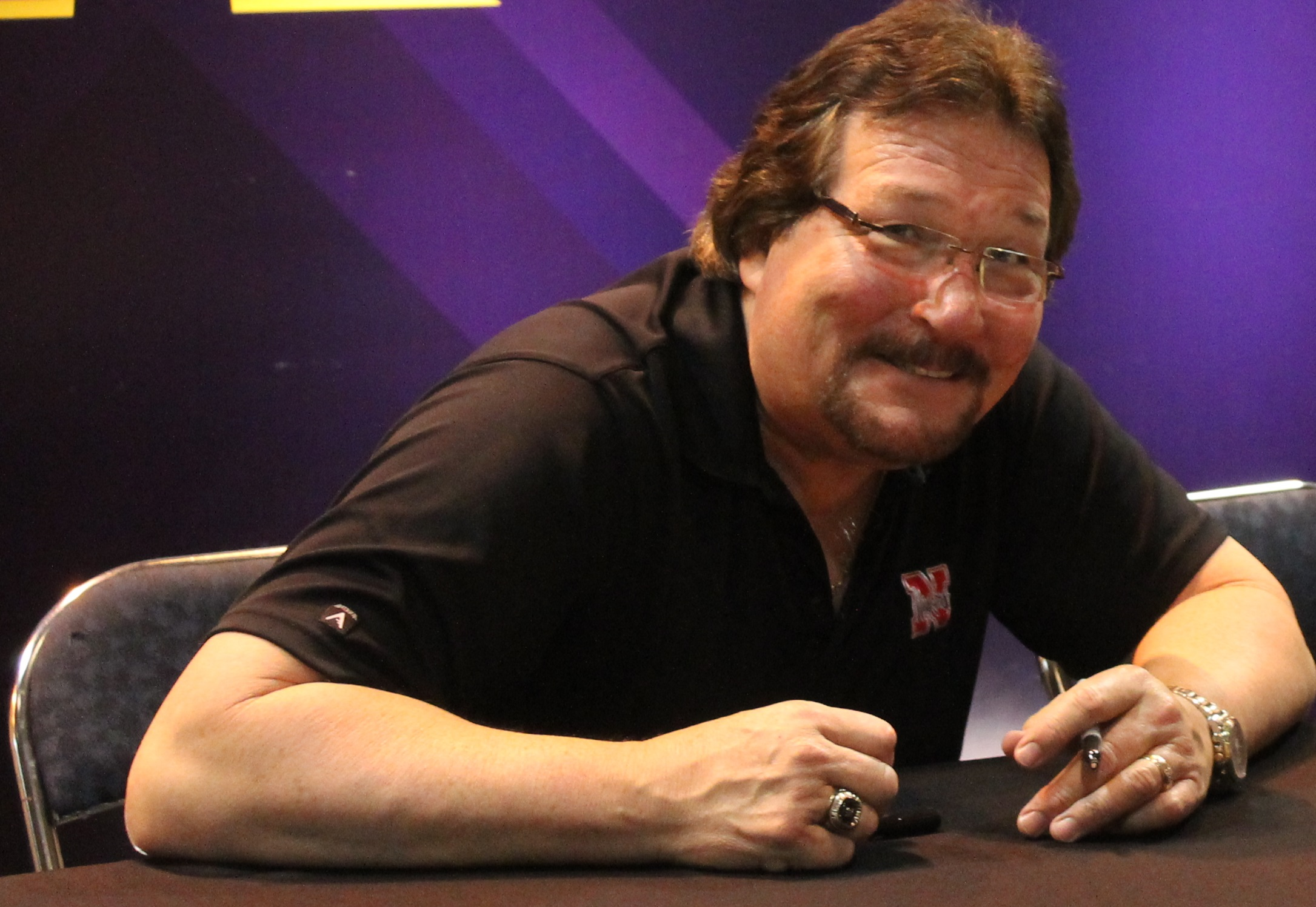
Ted DiBiase in 2014

Both DiBiase and Schyster had gimmicks that focused on money. Schyster, whose initials spelled I.R.S., portrayed an evil tax accountant. DiBiase had used the gimmick of an arrogant millionaire in the WWF since 1987. He called himself the "Million Dollar Man" and created his own championship belt, the Million Dollar Championship. He was involved in angles that included purchasing the WWF Championship, purchasing actual people such as Nikolai Volkoff and Sapphire Sapphire began appearing in segments where she would do favors for DiBiase, including ironing his money. She left the WWF a short time later., and paying wrestlers and fans to perform demeaning tasks. The WWF creative team decided that the two characters fit well together and made the decision to pair them together in late 1991. In February 1992, a storyline began in which Jimmy Hart, who had been managing The Natural Disasters (Earthquake and Typhoon), turned against his team. In return for a bribe, he gave his team's contract for a WWF Tag Team Championship match against Legion of Doom (LOD) to Money Inc.

=== Tag Team Championships ===
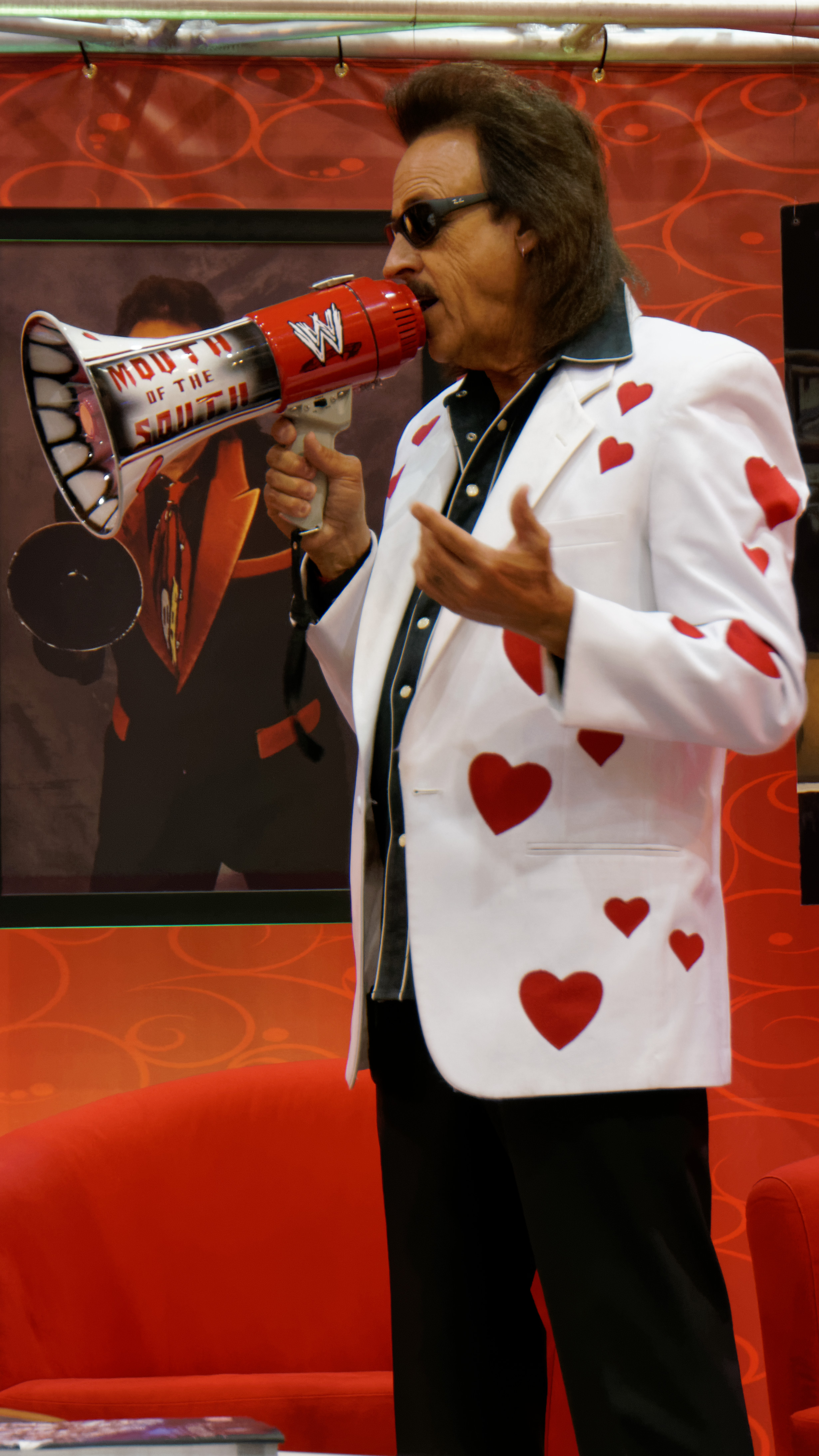
Jimmy Hart, manager of Money Inc.

DiBiase and Schyster, managed by Hart, defeated LOD at a house show on February 7, 1992 in Denver, Colorado, to win the title. This title win was unusual for professional wrestling, as Money Inc. had not yet debuted as a team on WWF television programming. In addition, the decision to give the championship belts to Money Inc. was made in a hurry, as LOD's Hawk had failed a drug test. The wrestlers were unaware until that night that the title would change hands, and Money Inc.'s win was not immediately acknowledged on television, as WWF programming was taped in advance. The Natural Disasters, upset by Hart's assistance to a rival tag team, fired Hart as their manager and turned face, beginning a feud with Money Inc. over the WWF Tag Team Championship.

Not wanting to carry two championship belts, Ted DiBiase returned the Million Dollar Championship to the WWF, telling an executive that he would no longer appear with the belt. Money Inc. defended their tag team title against The Natural Disasters at WrestleMania VIII on April 5 and lost the match by countout. Because titles can only change hands via pinfall or submission, Money Inc. retained the belts. Over the next few months, the teams faced each other in rematches on television and at house shows, but Money Inc. managed to retain the title.

After Hawk's suspension ended, the Legion of Doom was given a rematch against Money Inc. at SummerSlam 1992. The match was promoted as a championship bout, but the Natural Disasters beat Money Inc. for the title a month before the pay-per-view. At SummerSlam on August 29, the Legion of Doom won the match when Animal pinned DiBiase.

At the October 13, 1992 Wrestling Challenge taping, Money Inc. faced The Natural Disasters in a rematch for the WWF Tag Team Championship. The match originally pitted the Disasters against The Nasty Boys, who were also managed by Hart, but at the last minute, Hart replaced them with Money Inc. Because of this, the Nasty Boys split with Hart and attacked Money Inc. before the match. Later on, The Headshrinkers interfered on behalf of Money Inc. and helped DiBiase make Earthquake submit to the Million Dollar Dream, thereby winning Money Inc. the Championship. After the match, the Nasty Boys again attacked Jimmy Hart. At the 1992 Survivor Series on November 25, Money Inc. and the Beverly Brothers faced the Nasty Boys and the Natural Disasters in an 8-man elimination tag team match. During the match, Money Inc. eliminated the Natural Disasters, but Jerry Sags of the Nasty Boys then pinned I.R.S. to win the match. This was the only major victory The Nasty Boys got over Money Inc., as they failed to win the tag team title in several shots on television and at house shows in late 1992 into early 1993.

=== Feud with The Mega-Maniacs ===
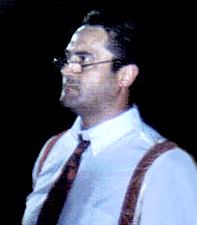
Irwin R. Schyster in 1994

On the February 15, 1993 airing of Monday Night Raw, Ted DiBiase wrestled against Brutus "The Barber" Beefcake. Beefcake had sustained a real-life injury to his face in 1990. While Beefcake was wrestling his first match in two and a half years, DiBiase and Schyster attacked him. DiBiase held Beefcake for Schyster to hit him in the face with a briefcase, but Jimmy Hart repeatedly got in the way before Schyster shoved him out of the ring. I.R.S. then hit Beefcake in the face with the briefcase. Hart justified his face turn by claiming that he felt the need to "step up and do the right thing" and that he "had a change of heart".

Shortly thereafter, Hulk Hogan made his return to WWF television, and he teamed with Beefcake to form The Mega-Maniacs with Hart as their manager. Hogan and Beefcake challenged Money Inc. for the WWF Tag Team Championship at WrestleMania IX. During the match, the referee sustained a kayfabe injury and was knocked unconscious. Hart jumped into the ring, turned his jacket inside-out to reveal black and white stripes similar to a referee's shirt, and made the three-count to give the match to The Mega-Maniacs. Hogan, Beefcake, and Hart celebrated by opening Schyster's briefcase and throwing his money into the crowd. A second referee (Danny Davis) then appeared, and the Mega-Maniacs were disqualified because Hogan had used Beefcake's steel face protector as a weapon.

=== Final Tag Team Championship ===
Money Inc. feuded with The Steiner Brothers in the spring of 1993. At the 1993 King of the Ring, The Steiner Brothers and the Smoking Gunns defeated Money Inc. and The Headshrinkers in an 8-man tag team match. The following day, June 14, 1993, the Steiners defeated Money Inc. for the WWF Tag Team Championship. Two days later, Money Inc. regained the titles, only to drop them back to the Steiners three days later. Although Money Inc. received several rematches, they were unable to win the belts back from the Steiners.

After failing to regain the WWF Tag Team Championship, Money Inc. began a feud with Razor Ramon. DiBiase had been making fun of Ramon over his upset loss to the 1-2-3 Kid, and even offered Ramon a job as his servant. Ramon was furious with DiBiase and turned face during their feud. Soon after, Ramon distracted DiBiase in a match against the 1-2-3 Kid, causing the Million Dollar Man an embarrassing loss of his own. At SummerSlam 1993, Razor Ramon defeated Ted DiBiase in what would be DiBiase's last WWF match. Later in the event, I.R.S. defeated the 1-2-3 Kid. DiBiase went on a leave of absence for several months, and Schyster returned to singles competition, feuding with Ramon. After a brief run in All Japan Pro Wrestling, DiBiase retired as an active wrestler.

== Reunions ==
Mike Rotunda, who portrayed Schyster, and Ted DiBiase continue to be close friends in real life, and they have reunited on several occasions following the disbanding of Money Inc. In 1994, DiBiase formed the Million Dollar Corporation, a stable of heel wrestlers. Schyster was one of the first wrestlers to join the group and remained in the stable until leaving the WWF in 1995. According to wrestler Tatanka, Rotunda's brother in-law Barry Windham (whom Rotunda was in the U.S. Express with in the 1980s) was supposed to return to the WWF and form the "New Money Inc." and again team with Schyster and have a long feud with Windham's long time rival Lex Luger and Tatanka who Schyster was feuding with and Schyster and Windham were gonna be managed by DiBiase, but Windham suffered a knee injury from Ric Flair in WCW which forced him out of the deal.

In 1996, DiBiase and Rotunda (the latter as V.K. Wallstreet) were briefly together again in World Championship Wrestling as members of the New World Order.

Money Inc. made a surprise one-night return at Raw Family Reunion on October 9, 2006. They joined Arn Anderson and Rowdy Roddy Piper to assist Ric Flair, who was facing Mitch. They prevented the rest of Mitch's Spirit Squad from getting involved in the match, helping Flair secure the victory.

At the 15th Anniversary special edition of Monday Night Raw on December 10, 2007, Money Inc. had a brief reunion during a 15-man over-the-top-rope battle royal. After I.R.S. was the last man standing out of the 14 wrestlers that made it to the ring, DiBiase came out as the 15th entrant and paid I.R.S. to eliminate himself. As a result, DiBiase was named the winner of the match. They were also reunited on an episode of RAW in 2010 where they fought with fellow legends after a match between DiBiase's son Ted DiBiase and Christian.

== Championships and accomplishments ==
- World Wrestling Federation
  - WWF Tag Team Championship (3 times)
- Pro Wrestling Illustrated
  - PWI ranked them No. 61 of the 100 best tag teams during the "PWI Years" in 2003

== See also ==
- Million Dollar Corporation
- New World Order (professional wrestling)
- U.S. Express
- York Foundation
