= Doink the Clown =

Professional wrestling character

- WWE character
- Doink the Clown
- First appearance: WWF Superstars (1992)
- Last appearance: WWE 2K26 (2026)
- Created by: Road Warrior Hawk

In-universe information
- Alias: "Evil Clown"
- Height: 5 ft 10 in (177 cm)
- Weight: 243 lb (110 kg)

Doink the Clown is a professional wrestling gimmick originally and most popularly portrayed by Matt Borne, who debuted the Doink persona in the World Wrestling Federation (WWF, now WWE) in 1992. Doink is a clown wearing traditional clown makeup (or a mask decorated to resemble such) and brightly colored clothes. He began as a heel character, dubbed the "Evil Clown", before becoming a face character. In addition to Borne, Doink has been portrayed occasionally by other wrestlers in WWE and unofficially on the independent circuit.

WWE producer Bruce Prichard said in an interview on The Steve Austin Show that Road Warrior Hawk had originally conceived the idea of a miserable clown wrestling character.

== Appearances in WWF/WWE ==
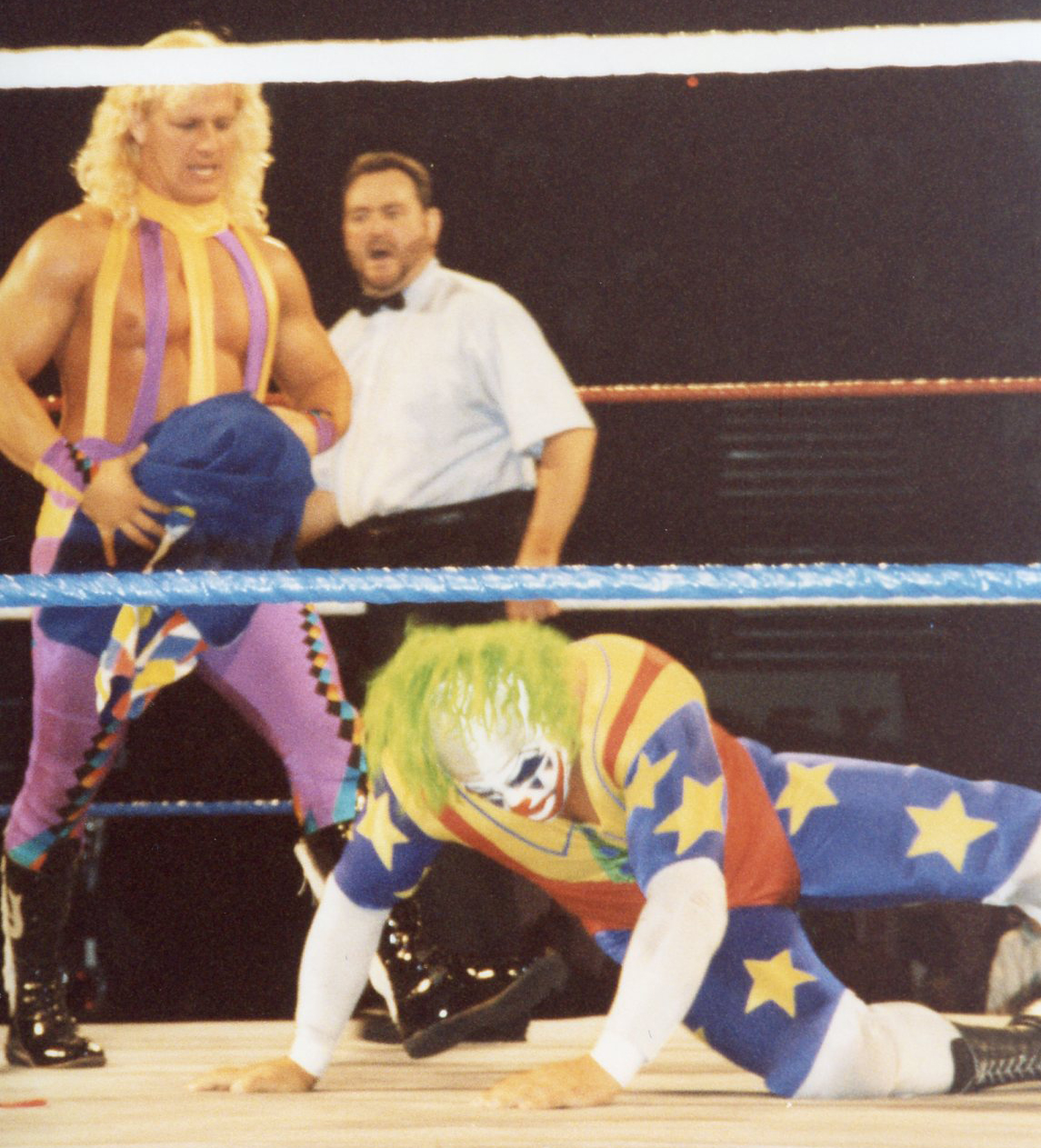
Doink wrestling Jeff Jarrett in 1994

=== Debut as a heel (1992–1993) ===
The Doink character first appeared on the October 31, 1992 episode of WWF Superstars of Wrestling where he is seen in the crowd and the camera cuts to him during a match between Tatanka vs Dale Wolfe. He would make further on-screen appearances in the crowd and at ringside, playing tricks on the fans and wrestlers, as of yet still a mysterious character. Doink began feuding with Crush beginning on the January 2, 1993 episode of Superstars. On the January 9 episode, he was interviewed by Ray Rougeau where he revealed his name and mentioned that he enjoys upsetting kids, after which he squirted Rougeau's face and then cackled. His in-ring debut on Monday Night Raw was on February 1 where he faced and defeated Typhoon.

Doink originally wrestled as a technically sound heel. Doink played cruel jokes on both fans and wrestlers to both amuse himself and catch his victims off-guard. Some of his villainous pranks included tripping Big Boss Man with a tripwire, "accidentally" poking Tatanka in the eye with a mop, dumping water on Marty Jannetty and attacking Crush with a loaded prosthetic arm. He clashed with Crush at WrestleMania IX, a match which he won after the appearance of an identical Doink (played by Steve Keirn using the name "Doink II") from underneath the ring. Afterwards Doink continued to pull pranks on other wrestlers, during May 1993, Doink fought Mr. Perfect three times in King of the Ring qualifying matches which all ended in draws until Perfect won the third and final match when Perfect actually pinned "Doink II," "Doink I" continue to swap with "Doink II" during matches (Steve Keirn even subbed for Matt Borne as Doink at several house shows and TV tapings during this time), "Doink II" even pinned Marty Jannetty in a two out of three falls match in which Randy Savage showed referee Earl Hebner that the wrong Doink won the match and Jannetty won by disqualification. As revenge, Doink challenged Savage to a match on Monday Night Raw by bringing not only "Doink II" but "Doink III" to the ring, Savage won the match, the WWF actually wanted to stop the multiple Doink angle around this time. Doink then substituted for Jerry Lawler, who faked an injury, against Bret Hart at SummerSlam in 1993.

=== Face turn (1993–1994) ===
Shortly after SummerSlam, Doink slowly began showing signs of a face turn, on the September 13 episode of Raw, he threw a bucket of water on Bobby Heenan resulting in Heenan suffering a (kayfabe) cold. He also turned on Lawler on the September 26 episode of WWF Wrestling Challenge in Lawler's The King's Court segment, making Burger King jokes to amuse the crowd and eventually emptied a bucket of water over Lawler.

Later in September 1993, he officially turned face by throwing confetti and water on Bam Bam Bigelow and his on screen girlfriend Luna Vachon starting a comedy feud. At Survivor Series, Doink teamed with The Bushwhackers and Men on a Mission, and their manager Oscar disguised as him and defeated Bigelow, Bastion Booger and The Headshrinkers in a comedic elimination match.

Around this time Matt Borne who played the heel version of Doink (also appeared a few times as babyface Doink) was fired due to failing a drug test and Steve Lombardi took over for Doink at house shows and at Survivor Series, Ray Apollo officially debuted as Doink over the video wall teasing Bigelow and Vachon.

=== Partnership with Dink the Clown (1994) ===
After Survivor Series, Doink was paired with a midget sidekick named Dink who was given to him by Santa Claus and Doink continued his feud with Bigelow which ended at WrestleMania X where he and Dink lost to Bigelow and Vachon in a mixed tag team match.

After the feud with Bigelow ended, Doink was placed in a short feud with Jeff Jarrett around May 1994 where Jerry Lawler interviewed Dink and told everyone that Doink was on vacation but Doink came out nowhere and attacked Dink which many people thought Doink was turning heel again but Doink removed his green hair and revealed himself to be Jarrett.

In 1994, Doink restarted his feud with Jerry Lawler by adding Wink and Pink to his entourage alongside Dink and forming “Clowns R Us.” Lawler countered with Queasy, Sleezy, and Cheesy as “The Royal Family,” and the two teams met at Survivor Series, where The Royal Family won.

=== Later years (1995–1997) ===
In early 1995, Doink became a jobber to the stars and after Dink was released from the WWF in June 1995. Doink was losing to big stars such as Waylon Mercy and Hunter Hearst-Helmsley and Ray Apollo, the portrayer of Doink, was officially released after his loss to Helmsley in September 1995. Steve Lombardi took over after Apollo was released and worked in house shows. Last WWF match as Doink was on March 9, 1996 when he defeated Zip in a WWF house show in Bangalore, India.

At the Slammy Awards in 1997, Doink (played by Steve Lombardi) made a surprise off-ring return where he tricks Stone Cold Steve Austin after which he gets attacked by Austin and The New Blackjacks.

=== Sporadic appearances (2001–present) ===
Ray Apollo returned to play him in the Gimmick Battle Royal at WrestleMania X-Seven. Played by Nick Dinsmore, he showed up in the A.P.A. Bar Room Brawl at Vengeance in 2003. He was selected by Rhino to face Chris Benoit on the July 31, 2003 Smackdown!.

Played by Steve Lombardi, he wrestled Rob Conway on an October 2005 episode of Raw. On June 2, 2007, Doink, Eugene and Kane defeated Umaga, Viscera and Kevin Thorn on Saturday Night's Main Event XXXIV. On December 10, 2007, Doink, played by Matt Borne for the final time, participated in a battle royal of 15 WWE alumni for the Raw 15th anniversary special episode. On the July 12, 2010 Raw, Doink teamed with William Regal, Primo and Zack Ryder to lose to Santino Marella, Goldust, Vladimir Kozlov and The Great Khali, when he was pinned by Khali. On the July 2, 2012 Raw, he made a surprise return and lost to Heath Slater. He reappeared on July 23, alongside several other WWE alumni, to help Lita take down Slater on WWE Raw 1000, the one thousandth episode of Raw.

At Money in the Bank 2020 on May 10, Doink briefly appeared from behind a chair after Daniel Bryan performed Yes Kicks on Baron Corbin with encouragement from Otis, after which, Bryan attacked Otis. This is, to date, Doink's final official appearance on WWE television.

== Appearances in other promotions ==
=== Midwest Territorial Wrestling (1994) ===
Doink (Matt Osborne) also had a few matches in 1994 in southeast Michigan. He faced off against Bastion Booger on July 14, 1994, in Port Huron, Michigan. He also wrestled alongside some other now known names such as Al Snow and Terry Funk when wrestling for MTW.

=== Extreme Championship Wrestling (1994) ===
Following his departure from the WWF, Osborne appeared (as Matt Borne) in Extreme Championship Wrestling (ECW) for several matches as Doink in a blue and green clown suit, setting up an angle where ECW champion Shane Douglas criticized Vince McMahon for turning a talented wrestler like Borne into a comic relief character, and claimed that he knew how to bring out Borne's full potential. Borne then made a few appearances with Douglas as "himself", sporting his face half-painted with the Doink makeup. His ring name under this gimmick was "Borne Again".

=== Independent circuit (2010–present) ===
In early 2010, Osborne reinvented the Doink character to resemble Heath Ledger's portrayal of the Joker in The Dark Knight, nicknaming the incarnation 'Reborne Again'. The new character debuted on March 27 for ISPW in New Jersey. On May 23, 2010, Doink the Clown, portrayed by Dusty Wolfe, interfered against Skandor Akbar and his men Dr. Knuckles and Rommel. This caused them to lose the Wrecking Ball Wrestling tag titles. In retaliation Akbar called on the original Doink Matt Borne. Wolfe and Borne were scheduled to meet on August 15, but Wolfe never arrived at the event. On August 8, 2010, Borne, as Doink the Clown, won the Wrecking Ball Wrestling Championship.

== Portrayers ==
- Matt Osborne (1992–2013) – Borne was the original Doink in the WWF, but was fired in December 1993 after testing positive for drugs. He made one final WWE appearance as Doink on the 15th anniversary episode of Monday Night Raw in 2007, losing in a battle royal. He died on June 28, 2013.
- Steve Keirn (1993–94, 1997, 2000) – Keirn wrestled as the "illusion" Doink at WWF WrestleMania IX and occasionally the "real" Doink at house shows.
- Steve Lombardi (1993–1996, 1998–1999, 2005, 2007, 2010, 2012, 2016) – Lombardi occasionally wrestled as Doink at house shows and later dressed as Doink for various WWE appearances. Also worked as Doink in independent promotions in Canada during the late 1990s. He is the last person to wrestle as Doink on WWE television, losing to Heath Slater on a 2012 episode of Monday Night Raw.
- Men on a Mission and The Bushwhackers (1993) – The two teams wrestled as "The Four Doinks" at the 1993 Survivor Series.
- Ray Licameli (Ray Apollo) (1993–2010, 2014) – Apollo wrestled as Doink in the WWF in 1993 to 1995 after Osborne left the company, and once more at 2001's WrestleMania X-Seven in the gimmick battle royal. He continued to use the gimmick on the independent circuit until his retirement in 2014.
- Mark Starr (1994) – Starr wrestled as Doink against Greg Valentine in October 1994 for the National Wrestling Conference.
- Jeff Jarrett (1994) – Jarrett once dressed up as Doink in the WWF during an angle with Dink the Clown.
- Ace Darling (1994–95) – Darling wrestled five matches as Doink for National Wrestling Alliance New Jersey and Smoky Mountain Wrestling.
- Dusty Wolfe (1995–1999, 2002–2010, 2012) – Wolfe wrestled as Doink in the NWA and on the independent circuit.
- TC Reynolds (1996–2010) – Wrestled as Doink in the independents in Ohio and Pennsylvania. Reynolds died on January 22, 2026 at 69 years old.
- Metal Maniac (1997–1998) – Wrestled as Doink for NWA New Jersey.
- Preston Steele (1998–2018) Wrestled as Doink in the independents until his retirement from wrestling in 2018.
- Chris Jericho (2001) – Jericho disguised himself as Doink in the WWF, in order to attack William Regal on the last Monday Night Raw before their WrestleMania X-Seven match.
- Nick Dinsmore (2003) – Dinsmore wrestled as Doink in WWE on their 2003 Vengeance pay-per-view, unsuccessfully competing in the APA Invitational Bar Room Brawl, and later in the year on an episode of SmackDown!, losing to Chris Benoit.
- Dwaine Henderson (2000s–2018) – wrestled as "Alabama Doink" on the independent circuit, notably competing in a battle royal at Game Changer Wrestling's Spring Break event in April 2018. Henderson died on June 19, 2018, at 40 years old.
- An unknown person portrayed Doink at the 2020 Money in the Bank pay-per-view, appearing during the men's Money in the Bank match.
- Numerous other wrestlers have portrayed the gimmick on the independent circuit.

== Other media ==
Doink is a playable character in Acclaim's 1994 video game, WWF Raw, Midway's WWF WrestleMania: The Arcade Game (1995), and THQ's SmackDown vs. Raw 2009 (2008, as a DLC character). Doink was also revealed as a post-launch superstar for WWE 2K Battlegrounds (2020) and headlined the "Clowning Around Pack" DLC in WWE 2K22 (2022) (the latter in his heel persona); this version of Doink also appeared in WWE 2K23, WWE 2K24, WWE 2K25, and WWE 2K26.

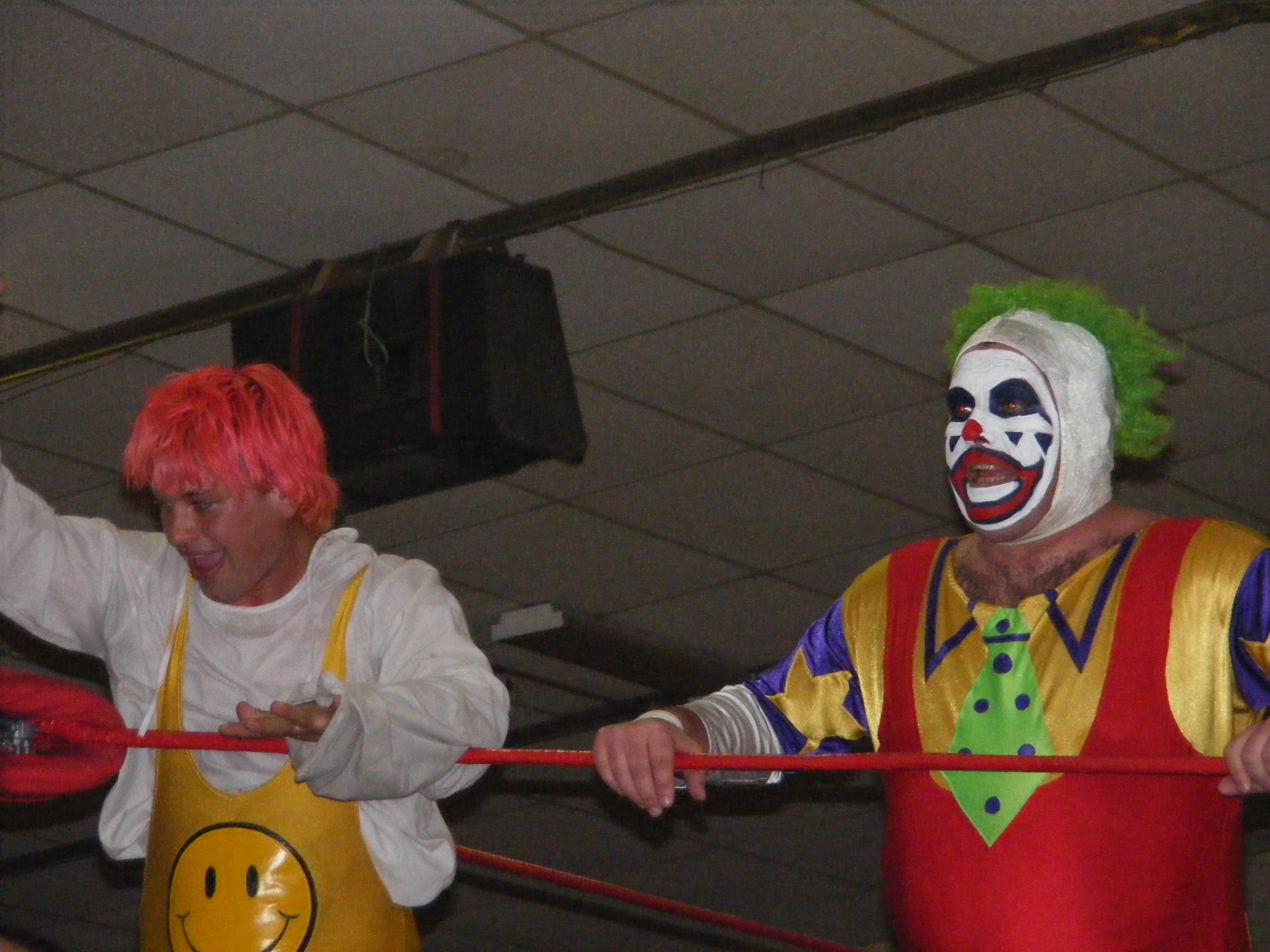
An independent wrestler performing as Doink in 2008

== Championships and accomplishments ==
- Allied Powers Wrestling Federation
  - APWF Television Championship (1 time)
- International Wrestling Association
  - IWA United States Heavyweight Championship (1 time)
- NWA Southwest
  - NWA Southwest Television Championship (1 time)
- Pro Wrestling Illustrated
  - PWI ranked him #26 of the top 500 singles wrestlers in the PWI 500 in 1992
- Regional Championship Wrestling
  - RCW United States Tag Team Championship (1 time) – with Jay Love
- Wrecking Ball Wrestling
  - WBW Heavyweight Championship (1 time)
- Wrestling Observer Newsletter
  - Most Embarrassing Wrestler (1994)
  - Worst Feud of the Year (1994) vs. Jerry Lawler
  - Worst Worked Match of the Year (1994) with Dink, Pink and Wink vs. Jerry Lawler, Sleazy, Queasy and Cheesy at Survivor Series

== See also ==
- El Gran Luchadore
- Los Conquistadores
- Suicide
