= Harvey Wippleman =

American professional wrestling manager, referee and wrestler

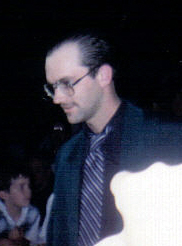
- Wippleman as a manager in 1994

Personal information
- Born: Bruno Lauer; October 27, 1965 (age 60) Jackson, Mississippi, U.S.

Professional wrestling career
- Ring name(s): Bruno; Dr. Lennerd Spazzinsky; Downtown Bruno; Harvey Wippleman; Handsome Harvey; Hervina; Uptown Bruno
- Billed height: 5 ft 7 in (170 cm)
- Billed weight: 155 lb (70 kg)
- Billed from: Walls, Mississippi
- Trained by: Geeto Mongol
- Debut: 1979

Bruno Lauer (born October 27, 1965) is an American professional wrestling manager, referee, and occasional wrestler, better known by his ring names, Harvey Wippleman and Downtown Bruno.

Wippleman began his career working in professional wrestling promotions in the Southern United States, especially Memphis. In the 1990s, he debuted in the World Wrestling Federation (WWF), where he managed wrestlers such as Sid Justice, Kamala, Giant Gonzalez and Bertha Faye.

In 2000, Wippleman became the first and only man to win the WWF Women's Championship, thus, technically making him a one time wrestling world champion. He works backstage in WWE (formerly the WWF) and occasionally manages in the Memphis area as Downtown Bruno.

== Professional wrestling career ==
=== Early career (1979–1991) ===
In 1979, Lauer attended an independent wrestling show at a circus in Pennsylvania. In exchange for helping to tear down the ring after the show, he was given free admission. He later joined the company and toured Ohio. During this time, The Royal Kangaroos' Jonathan Boyd became his mentor. Back in Pennsylvania, Geeto Mongol trained Lauer and gave him the ring name Dr. Lennerd Spazzinsky.

He then moved to Memphis, where he performed under the name Downtown Bruno. In 1986, he became the most prominent villainous manager in Memphis. In addition, wrestlers like Jerry Lawler and Sid Eudy helped his career. He continued to work in the Southern promotions for the rest of the late 1980s. He also worked briefly in Central States Wrestling territory in 1987. In September 1989, he won the Continental Wrestling Federation's Southeastern United States Junior Heavyweight Championship and held it until the promotion closed in November. It was in Continental in 1987 that he first teamed with Eudy, while Eudy was under a mask as an incarnation of Lord Humongous.

=== World Wrestling Federation/Entertainment (1991–present) ===
==== Manager (1991–1995) ====
In 1991, Sid Eudy helped bring Lauer to the World Wrestling Federation (WWF). He debuted as Harvey Wippleman, a Pee-wee Herman esque character wearing a pin-striped suit with slacks cut at his shins, a red bow-tie, and a flat cap. He first managed Big Bully Busick. When Busick left the company and Slick turned face, Wippleman took over managing The Warlord. His greatest acquisition was his real-life friend, Sid Justice. When Sid turned heel, working a program with Hulk Hogan leading to Wrestlemania, Wippleman became Sid Justice's manager and became "Dr. Harvey Wippleman". Wippleman would begin carrying a doctor's bag to the ring containing medical equipment. After Sid's matches against jobbers, Wippleman would retrieve a stethoscope from his bag and listen to the defeated wrestler's hearts.

Shortly after Sid left the company, Wippleman began managing Kamala who returned to the WWF for the first time since 1987 and was also paired with Kim Chee (played by Wippleman's real life best friend Steve Lombardi). It was during this time that Wippleman began a year long feud with The Undertaker. After Kamala was defeated by Undertaker in a Coffin match at Survivor Series in 1992, Kamala left Wippleman and Reverend Slick became his new manager. Afterwards, Wippleman dropped the Dr. gimmick and shaved his beard. He continued to feud with the Undertaker and brought a new wrestler to the WWF, the nearly eight-foot-tall Giant González. The feud culminated in a Rest in Peace match at SummerSlam, which Undertaker won. During this period, Wippleman also briefly managed Mr. Hughes, who left the WWF after a few months. Wippleman was also the manager of Adam Bomb from October 1993 until June 1994, when Bomb turned face, and feuded with Kwang, who was also being managed by Wippleman. Wippleman also managed Well Dunn, who faced the Rock 'n' Roll Express in the RnR's WWF debut on October 10, 1993.

Since debuting in the WWF, Wippleman was always at odds with ring announcer Howard Finkel, whom Wippleman believed introduced him in a condescending manner. At WrestleMania X, Wippleman tore up Finkel's tuxedo, and Finkel shoved him to the mat. The feud culminated in a tuxedo match on the January 9, 1995 edition of Monday Night RAW, which Finkel won.

Wippleman's next high-profile storyline was later in 1995, when he managed his on-screen girlfriend Bertha Faye. Faye, with Wippleman in her corner, won the WWF Women's Championship by defeating Alundra Blayze at SummerSlam 1995. After losing the WWF Women's Championship in late 1995, Faye was dropped from the WWF roster and Wippleman disappeared from television. According to Lauer, he and Bertha didn't get along.

==== Referee and road agent (1996–present) ====
By spring 1996, Wippleman began making appearances on WWF Superstars, critiquing the referees during the matches in preparation to make a full report to WWF President Gorilla Monsoon about the apparent lack of consistency amongst the officials. Monsoon rewarded Wippleman for his efforts by making him an official referee. One of Wippleman's last appearances as a regular WWF referee during this time came on the March 10, 1997 episode of Raw when Chyna gorilla pressed him into a group of referees. On the May 19, 1997 episode of Raw Wippleman appeared in a backstage segment with Stone Cold Steve Austin telling Wippleman that he was going to be his tag team partner with Wippleman responding that he was scared. Wippleman also appeared as "Handsome Harvey," introducing D-Generation-X on Raw on November 24, 1997. This was to make fun of Rick Rude. Rude had been a member of DX and had just left the company a week earlier to go to WCW. This resulted in Rude being on both Raw and WCW Monday Nitro on the same night. (At the time, Raw was taped every other week while Nitro was live every week).

In June 1999, after another period of absence from television broadcasts, Wippleman resurfaced on the June 13 episode of Sunday Night Heat as a referee in a match between then-Intercontinental Champion Jeff Jarrett and Test. Test won the match after outside interference, thus being named the new champion, but he was persuaded by Jarrett's valet Debra to overturn the result and return the belt. He also served as a scab official during the WWF referee strike in September 1999, including at the Unforgiven PPV, again refereeing a match with Jarrett defending the Intercontinental title against Chyna.

On January 31, 2000, Wippleman won the WWF Women's Championship from The Kat while he was in a disguise and used the name "Hervina" in a "Lumberjill Snow Bunny" match, which took place in a snow-filled pool surrounded by female wrestlers who kept the competitors from leaving the pool. The win made him the first male to hold the Women's Championship. He lost the title the following day (but broadcast on February 3) to Jacqueline in a match that lasted under a minute, thus ending the shortest reign in the title's history. Through the remainder of 2000, Wippleman appeared in backstage and non-match segments of the WWF's television programming, including a segment on the April 23, 2000 episode of Sunday Night Heat where he appeared dressed up as a rabbit as part of a segment with Al Snow and Steve Blackman.

At WrestleMania X-Seven on April 1, 2001, Wippleman managed Kamala during the gimmick battle royal.

At the point the Invasion storyline began in 2001, he had disappeared from WWF programming, and was then working as a road agent for the company.

On November 15, 2010, for WWE's old school episode of Raw, Wippleman returned to WWE, managing the Brooklyn Brawler in a squash loss to Ezekiel Jackson.

As of 2011, Lauer was working with the WWE in backstage roles at television and pay-per-view events. In an interview with Jim Korderas, Lauer described his role as "concierge", taking care of details such as food, rental cars and the like.

On January 22, 2018, Harvey made a brief backstage appearance during Raw 25 Years.

In 2020, Dwayne "The Rock" Johnson named Lauer as the "GOAT" (greatest of all time) for assisting Johnson early in his career and providing him a place to stay. Lauer, as the character Downtown Bruno, was portrayed by actor Ryan Pinkston in season two and three of the show Young Rock.

== Personal life ==
Lauer grew up in Walls, Mississippi, near Memphis, Tennessee. According to Lauer, he spent his teenage years "sprawling on car hoods, smoking cigarettes, and drinking beer with no particular ambition in mind". His drinking eventually caused Lauer to serve jail time in Memphis.

In 1994, Lauer was in a car accident with Joey Marella, which claimed Marella's life and injured Lauer. The crash occurred as a result of Marella falling asleep at the wheel while driving on the way to Newark. Marella was not wearing his seat belt, but Lauer–the passenger–was wearing his. Because of the severity of his injuries, Lauer incurred approximately $10,000 in medical expenses. He wrote an autobiography Wrestling with the Truth, which was released in 2008. Lauer is Roman Catholic. Lauer was elected as a member of the board of aldermen for a four-year term on June 8, 2021, in his hometown of Walls, Mississippi.

== Championships and accomplishments ==
- Cauliflower Alley Club
  - Manager Award (2011)
- Continental Wrestling Federation
  - Southeast United States Junior Heavyweight Championship (1 time)
- Memphis Wrestling Hall of Fame
  - Class of 2021
- World Wrestling Federation
  - WWF Women's Championship (1 time)
