= WWF The Main Event =

Professional wrestling television series

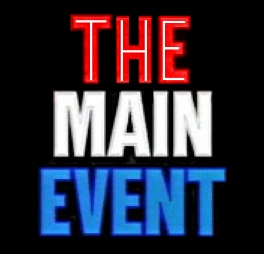
- Genre: Professional wrestling
- Created by: Vince McMahon
- Starring: World Wrestling Federation roster
- Country of origin: United States
- Original language: English
- No. of episodes: 5

Production
- Running time: 60 minutes
- Production companies: Once a Month Productions; Titan Sports Inc.

Original release
- Network: NBC
- Release: February 5, 1988 – February 1, 1991

Related
- Saturday Night's Main Event

WWF The Main Event, or simply The Main Event, is an American series of professional wrestling television specials that were produced by the World Wrestling Federation (WWF). The Main Event was a spin-off of Saturday Night's Main Event and was held only one time in a year (with the exception of 1990 where it was held twice) and was equivalent to today’s monthly pay-per-view (PPV) events. Like Saturday Night’s Main Event, The Main Event aired late and held its main event match on the first hour of the show. There were five shows between 1988 and 1991. Only the first three The Main Event episodes were shown live on NBC. The final two were taped and then shown on NBC at a later date. It included mainly high-card wrestlers of the WWF including Hulk Hogan, André the Giant, "Macho Man" Randy Savage, Ultimate Warrior and "Million Dollar Man" Ted DiBiase.

All episodes of The Main Event are available on the WWE Network (in a few countries), Peacock in the U.S. and Netflix in other major international markets, included with Saturday Night's Main Event.

== Dates and venues ==
Event	Date	City	Venue	Main Event	Ref
The Main Event	February 5, 1988	Indianapolis, Indiana	Market Square Arena	Hulk Hogan (c) vs. André the Giant for the WWF World Heavyweight Championship	
The Main Event II	February 3, 1989	Milwaukee, Wisconsin	Bradley Center	The Mega Powers (Hulk Hogan & Randy Savage) vs. The Twin Towers (Akeem & Big Boss Man)	
The Main Event III	February 23, 1990	Detroit, Michigan	Joe Louis Arena	Hulk Hogan (c) vs. Randy Savage for the WWF Championship with Buster Douglas as special guest referee	
The Main Event IV	October 30, 1990; Aired November 23, 1990	Fort Wayne, Indiana	Allen County War Memorial Coliseum	Ultimate Warrior (c) vs. Ted DiBiase for the WWF Championship	
The Main Event V	January 28, 1991; Aired February 1, 1991	Macon, Georgia	Macon Coliseum	Hulk Hogan and Tugboat vs. Earthquake and Dino Bravo	
(c) – refers to the champion(s) heading into the match

== Results ==
=== The Main Event ===
The Main Event
- Promotion: World Wrestling Federation
- Date: February 5, 1988
- City: Indianapolis, Indiana
- Venue: Market Square Arena

The Main Event chronology
← Previous; First	Next → II

Television special chronology
← Previous; Royal Rumble	Next → Saturday Night's Main Event XIV

The Main Event took place, and aired live, on Friday February 5, 1988 at 8pm ET at Market Square Arena in Indianapolis, Indiana. The live broadcast drew a 15.2 Nielsen rating and 33 million viewers, both records for American televised wrestling.

The match between André the Giant and Hulk Hogan saw André receive a pinfall victory despite Hogan raising his left shoulder before a count of two could be reached. It was revealed, post-match, that the referee who worked the match was not the assigned referee, Dave Hebner, but rather his twin brother, Earl Hebner. Earl had been hired by Ted DiBiase to cheat Hogan out of the belt. Immediately after the match, André surrendered the title to DiBiase. Later on, WWF President Jack Tunney said the title can only change hands by pinfall or submission. Tunney acknowledged that the referee's decision is final but, due to André surrendering the belt, he declared the title to be vacant. Following the vacancy, a single elimination tournament was held at WrestleMania IV to crown the new champion.

The Strike Force vs. The Hart Foundation match was still in progress when NBC signed off. In 2014, when the WWE Network made available this episode to its on-demand section, the ending of the match was added in.

No.	Results	Stipulations	Times
1^{D}	Ax defeated Ken Patera	Singles match	9:06
2^{D}	Jake Roberts defeated Harley Race	Singles match	11:21
3^{D}	Ron Bass defeated Koko B. Ware	Singles match	6:33
4^{D}	The British Bulldogs (Davey Boy Smith and Dynamite Kid) defeated The Islanders (Haku and Tama)	Tag team match	13:42
5^{D}	Jim Duggan defeated One Man Gang	Singles match	5:55
6^{D}	Ultimate Warrior defeated Sika	Singles match	4:01
7	Randy Savage (with Miss Elizabeth) defeated The Honky Tonk Man (c) (with Jimmy Hart and Peggy Sue) by countout	Singles match for the WWF Intercontinental Championship	8:20
8	André the Giant (with Ted DiBiase and Virgil) defeated Hulk Hogan (c)	Singles match for the WWF World Heavyweight Championship	10:05
9^{D}	Strike Force (Tito Santana and Rick Martel) (c) defeated The Hart Foundation (Bret Hart and Jim Neidhart) (with Jimmy Hart)	Tag team match for the WWF Tag Team Championship	10:03
(c) / – the champion(s) heading into the match; D / – this was a dark match

=== The Main Event II ===
The Main Event II
- Promotion: World Wrestling Federation
- Date: February 3, 1989
- City: Milwaukee, Wisconsin
- Venue: Bradley Center

The Main Event chronology
← Previous; 1988	Next → III

Television special chronology
← Previous; Saturday Night's Main Event XIX	Next → Saturday Night's Main Event XX

The Main Event II took place and aired live on Friday February 3, 1989 at 8pm ET from the Bradley Center in Milwaukee, Wisconsin. The live broadcast drew an 11.6 rating and 19.9 million viewers.

The slowly building tension between Hulk Hogan and "Macho Man" Randy Savage boiled over during the team's match against The Twin Towers, leading to the team's breakup upon Savage's heel turn when Savage contended that Hogan was lusting after his manager, Miss Elizabeth.

No.	Results	Stipulations	Times
1^{D}	André the Giant (with Bobby Heenan) defeated Jake Roberts	Singles match	7:11
2^{D}	The Fabulous Rougeaus (Jacques Rougeau and Raymond Rougeau) (with Jimmy Hart) defeated The Hart Foundation (Bret Hart and Jim Neidhart)	Tag team match with Brother Love as special guest referee	19:35
3^{D}	Ultimate Warrior (c) defeated Greg Valentine (with Jimmy Hart)	Singles match for the WWF Intercontinental Championship	05:19
4^{D}	Demolition (Ax and Smash) (c) defeated The Powers of Pain (The Warlord and The Barbarian) (with Mr. Fuji) by disqualification	Tag team match for the WWF Tag Team Championship	8:16
5^{D}	The Brain Busters (Arn Anderson and Tully Blanchard) defeated The Rockers (Shawn Michaels and Marty Jannetty)	Tag team match	14:16
6^{D}	Brutus Beefcake vs. Mr. Perfect ended in a double disqualification	Singles match	12:34
7^{D}	Jim Duggan defeated Dino Bravo (with Frenchy Martin)	Flag match	6:08
8	The Mega Powers (Hulk Hogan and Randy Savage) (with Miss Elizabeth) defeated The Twin Towers (Akeem and Big Boss Man) (with Slick)	Tag team match	22:00
9	Ted DiBiase (with Virgil) defeated Hercules	Singles match	7:12
(c) / – the champion(s) heading into the match; D / – this was a dark match

=== The Main Event III ===
The Main Event III
- Promotion: World Wrestling Federation
- Date: February 23, 1990
- City: Detroit, Michigan
- Venue: Joe Louis Arena

The Main Event chronology
← Previous; II	Next → IV

Television special chronology
← Previous; Saturday Night's Main Event XXV	Next → The Ultimate Challenge

The Main Event III took place and aired live on February 23, 1990, at 10pm ET from the Joe Louis Arena in Detroit, Michigan. The live broadcast drew a 12.8 rating and 20.9 million viewers.

Mike Tyson was originally scheduled to be the special guest referee, but this changed following Buster Douglas' knockout title win over Tyson just under two weeks before, on February 11. Tyson would eventually be the guest referee at WrestleMania XIV.

Tito Santana was a substitute for Jimmy Snuka.

No.	Results	Stipulations	Times
1^{D}	Earthquake defeated Ron Garvin	Singles match	5:12
2^{D}	Dusty Rhodes (with Sapphire) defeated Mr. Perfect (with (The Genius)	Singles match	11:26
3^{D}	Ted DiBiase (with Virgil) defeated Jake Roberts	Singles match	10:28
4^{D}	The Colossal Connection (André the Giant and Haku) (c) defeated Demolition (Ax and Smash)	Tag team match for the WWF Tag Team Championship	10:04
5^{D}	Bad News Brown defeated Tito Santana	Singles match	5:31
6^{D}	Rick Martel defeated Brutus Beefcake	Singles match	12:15
7^{D}	Roddy Piper vs. Rick Rude ended in a double disqualification	Lumberjack match	13:00
8	Hulk Hogan (c) defeated Randy Savage (with Queen Sherri)	Singles match for the WWF Championship with Buster Douglas as special guest referee	11:14
9	Ultimate Warrior (c) defeated Dino Bravo (with Jimmy Hart and Earthquake)	Singles match for the WWF Intercontinental Championship	4:11
(c) / – the champion(s) heading into the match; D / – this was a dark match

=== The Main Event IV ===
The Main Event IV
- Promotion: World Wrestling Federation
- Date: October 30, 1990 (aired November 23, 1990)
- City: Fort Wayne, Indiana
- Venue: Allen County War Memorial Coliseum

The Main Event chronology
← Previous; III	Next → V

Television special chronology
← Previous; Saturday Night's Main Event XXVIII	Next → Survivor Series Showdown

The Main Event IV took place on October 30, 1990, from the Allen County War Memorial Coliseum in Fort Wayne, Indiana, and aired on Friday November 23, 1990 at 10pm ET. The broadcast drew an 8.6 rating and 15 million viewers.

The WWF Tag Team Championship match between The Hart Foundation and The Rockers was supposed to be on the show. The Rockers defended their newly won titles a few times before the WWF rehired Jim Neidhart, pairing him with Bret Hart once more, and quietly handing the belts back to The Hart Foundation, erasing The Rockers' reign from the history books. Retrospectively, the WWF explained that the title change had been revoked due to a ring rope malfunction during the second fall of the two-out-of-three falls match. The match can be seen unedited on the DVD The Shawn Michaels Story: Heartbreak & Triumph. Marty Jannetty pinned Bret Hart in the first fall with a sunset flip counter at 9:33. Hart pinned Shawn Michaels in the second fall with the Hart Attack at 19:23. Jannetty pinned Jim Neidhart in the third fall when Michaels dropkicked Jannetty onto Neidhart, who was setting up the Hart Attack at 25:41.

Nikolai Volkoff was scheduled to face Sgt. Slaughter on the show, but Slaughter attacked Nikolai before the opening bell rang and the match never took place.

No.	Results	Stipulations	Times
1^{D}	The Rockers (Shawn Michaels and Marty Jannetty) defeated The Hart Foundation (Bret Hart and Jim Neidhart) (c) 2-1	Two-out-of-three falls match for the WWF Tag Team Championship	25:41
2	Ultimate Warrior (c) defeated Ted DiBiase (with Virgil) by disqualification	Singles match for the WWF Championship	9:47
3	Mr. Perfect defeated Big Boss Man by countout	Singles match	8:15
4	Rick Martel defeated Tito Santana	Singles match	6:46
(c) / – the champion(s) heading into the match; D / – this was a dark match

=== The Main Event V ===
The Main Event V
- Promotion: World Wrestling Federation
- Date: January 28, 1991 (aired February 1, 1991)
- City: Macon, Georgia
- Venue: Macon Coliseum

The Main Event chronology
← Previous; IV	Next → Final

Television special chronology
← Previous; Survivor Series Showdown	Next → WrestleFest Tokyo

The Main Event V took place on January 28, 1991, from the Macon Coliseum in Macon, Georgia, and aired on Friday February 1, 1991 at 8pm ET.

KNBC, the NBC-owned-and-operated station in Los Angeles, did not air this program when it was shown by the network on February 1. That day, a collision took place at Los Angeles International Airport between a US Airways passenger jet and a SkyWest Airlines commuter plane. The crash occurred in the late afternoon, and KNBC opted to air news bulletin coverage of this story throughout the night. The station did replay the program unadvertised on a later date.

The broadcast drew 10.6 million viewers and a 6.7 rating, which was at the time the worst rating any WWF program had received on NBC despite the presence of Hulk Hogan. This has been blamed on the controversial and exploitative Sgt. Slaughter Iraqi sympathizer storyline that was on going at the time.

WWF President Jack Tunney declared Hulk Hogan the number one contender for Sgt. Slaughter's WWF Championship at WrestleMania VII.

No.	Results	Stipulations	Times
1	Hulk Hogan and Tugboat defeated Earthquake and Dino Bravo (with Jimmy Hart)	Tag team match	8:56
2	Jim Duggan (with Hulk Hogan) defeated Sgt. Slaughter (c) (with General Adnan) by disqualification	Singles match for the WWF Championship	6:50
3	The Legion of Doom (Hawk and Animal) defeated The Orient Express (Kato and Tanaka) (with Mr. Fuji)	Tag team match	5:11
(c) / – the champion(s) heading into the match
