= Survivor Series Showdown =

Series of World Wrestling Federation television specials

- Genre: Professional wrestling
- Created by: Vince McMahon
- Starring: World Wrestling Federation roster
- Country of origin: United States
- Original language: English
- No. of episodes: 5

Production
- Running time: 120 minutes
- Production company: World Wrestling Federation

Original release
- Network: USA Network
- Release: November 12, 1989 – November 21, 1993

Survivor Series Showdown is an American professional wrestling television program that was produced by the World Wrestling Federation (WWF). Five separate specials aired on the USA Network, one week prior to that year's respective Survivor Series.

During this period of time, the WWF regularly ran specials to promote their pay-per-view events. Similar to this series, March to WrestleMania ran the week prior to that year's WrestleMania and SummerSlam Spectacular prior to SummerSlam.

== Event history ==
=== 1989 ===
Survivor Series Showdown
- Promotion: World Wrestling Federation
- Date: November 1, 1989 (aired November 12, 1989)
- City: Park City, Kansas
- Venue: Kansas Coliseum

Survivor Series Showdown chronology
| ← Previous — | Next → 1990 |

Television special chronology
| ← Previous; Saturday Night's Main Event XXIV | Next → Saturday Night's Main Event XXV |

The 1989 edition of Survivor Series Showdown aired on the USA Network on November 12, 1989 (taped November 1, 1989) from the Kansas Coliseum in Wichita, Kansas. This episode aired as a special edition of WWF Prime Time Wrestling.

In the opening match Tito Santana defeated Big Boss Man after Dusty Rhodes got Boss Man's night stick and attacked him with it.

The next match saw Mr. Perfect pin Bushwacker Butch with the "Perfect Plex". Following the match, The Bushwhackers hitting a "Battering Ram" and double clothesline on Perfect and The Genius, clearing them from the ring.

The third match saw Randy Savage defeating Hercules, after hitting him with Sensational Sheri's purse.

In the next match, although Ultimate Warrior was the WWF Intercontinental Champion at the time of the event, his match against Tully Blanchard was a non-title match. The match saw the Warrior win via disqualification after Arn Anderson interfered. Following the match, a brawl broke out with Warrior, Jim Neidhart, Shawn Michaels, and Marty Jannetty against Blanchard, Anderson, Haku, and André the Giant. The match would be Blanchard's last in the WWF.

The final match saw Ted DiBiase pin Smash following interference by Zeus. Following the match, DiBiase put Smash in the "Million Dollar Dream", which was broken up by Ax.

| No. | Results | Stipulations | Times |
|---|---|---|---|
| 1 | Tito Santana (w/ Dusty Rhodes) defeated Big Boss Man (w/ Akeem & Slick) | Singles match | 11:35 |
| 2 | Mr. Perfect (w/ The Genius) defeated Bushwacker Butch (w/ Bushwacker Luke) | Singles match | 6:55 |
| 3 | Randy Savage (w/ Queen Sherri) defeated Hercules | Singles match | 10:54 |
| 4 | Ultimate Warrior defeated Tully Blanchard (w/ Bobby Heenan) by disqualification | Singles match | 6:00 |
| 5 | Ted DiBiase (w/ Virgil) defeated Smash | Singles match | 10:11 |

=== 1990 ===
Survivor Series Showdown
- Promotion: World Wrestling Federation
- Date: October 29, 1990 (aired November 18, 1990)
- City: Indianapolis, Indiana
- Venue: Market Square Arena

Survivor Series Showdown chronology
| ← Previous; 1989 | Next → 1991 |

Television special chronology
| ← Previous; The Main Event IV | Next → The Main Event V |

The 1990 edition of Survivor Series Showdown aired on the USA Network on November 18, 1990 (taped October 29, 1990) from the Market Square Arena in Indianapolis, Indiana.

The opening match saw Sgt. Slaughter pin Tito Santana after Gen. Adnan took Santana's feet out from under him while attempted a suplex.

The next match was Marty Jannetty vs Rick Martel. Janetty attempted a slingshot into the ring, however he hit his head which opened up an opportunity for Martel to get the pin.

The third match saw Earthquake defeat Big Boss Man via countout. Bobby Heenan, who was an announcer during the event, left his position in order to hit Boss Man with a cheap shot behind the referees back. This caused Boss Man to chase Heenan backstage and ultimately be counted out.

Next Bret Hart defeated The Honky Tonk Man, after Honky collided with Jimmy Hart on the apron, allowing Bret to take advance and record a pinfall victory.

The final match, for the WWF Intercontinental Championship, saw the champion The Texas Tornado, retain his championship via disqualification against Smash, when Mr. Perfect, Ax, and Crush interfered. Following the match, they continued attacking Tornado until Legion of Doom, and The Ultimate Warrior came out and broke it up.

| No. | Results | Stipulations | Times |
|---|---|---|---|
| 1 | Sgt. Slaughter (w/ Gen. Adnan) defeated Tito Santana | Singles match | 11:30 |
| 2 | Rick Martel defeated Marty Jannetty | Singles match | 10:49 |
| 3 | Earthquake (w/ Jimmy Hart) defeated Big Boss Man by countout | Singles match | 10:59 |
| 4 | Bret Hart defeated The Honky Tonk Man (w/Jimmy Hart) | Singles match | 10:25 |
| 5 | The Texas Tornado (c) defeated Smash by disqualification | Singles match for the WWF Intercontinental Championship | 7:44 |
(c) / – the champion(s) heading into the match

=== 1991 ===
Survivor Series Showdown
- Promotion: World Wrestling Federation
- Date: November 11, 1991 (aired November 24, 1991)
- City: Utica, New York
- Venue: War Memorial Auditorium
- Attendance: 5,000

Survivor Series Showdown chronology
| ← Previous; 1990 | Next → 1992 |

Television special chronology
| ← Previous; Battle Royal at the Albert Hall | Next → SuperWrestle |

The 1991 edition of Survivor Series Showdown aired on the USA Network on November 24, 1991 (taped November 11, 1991) from the | Memorial Auditorium]] in Utica, New York. The commentators during the event were Vince McMahon and Bobby Heenan.

This episode aired as a special edition of WWF Prime Time Wrestling.

In the opening match Big Boss Man, defeated Earthquake, when Jake Roberts, Typhoon, and Irwin R. Schyster interfered. Following the match, Legion of Doom, came out to save Boss Man.

During the next match, when Blake Beverly missed a splash off the top rope, Bushwacker Luke took advantage and recorded the pinfall victory.

The third match saw Repo Man come out and hit Virgil with the Million Dollar Championship, allowing Ted DiBiase to pick up the victory and win back the championship. Following the match, DiBiase went to put a $100 bill in Virgil's mouth, however Tito Santana came out and chased DiBiase to the back.

| No. | Results | Stipulations | Times |
|---|---|---|---|
| 1 | Big Boss Man defeated Earthquake (w/ Jimmy Hart) by disqualification | Singles match | 10:00 |
| 2 | Bushwhacker Luke defeated Blake Beverly (w/ The Genius) | Singles match | 6:25 |
| 3 | Ted DiBiase (w/ Sensational Sherri) defeated Virgil (c) | Singles match for the Million Dollar Championship | 9:46 |
| 4 | El Matador defeated Skinner | Singles match | 11:27 |
| 5 | Roddy Piper defeated Hercules | Singles match | 5:09 |
(c) / – the champion(s) heading into the match

=== 1992 ===
Survivor Series Showdown
- Promotion: World Wrestling Federation
- Date: October 26, 1992 (aired November 22, 1992)
- City: Springfield, Illinois
- Venue: Prairie Capital Convention Center
- Attendance: 4,500

Survivor Series Showdown chronology
| ← Previous; 1991 | Next → 1993 |

Television special chronology
| ← Previous; Saturday Night's Main Event XXXI | Next → March to WrestleMania IX |

The 1992 edition of Survivor Series Showdown aired on the USA Network on November 22, 1992 (taped October 26, 1992) from the Prairie Capital Convention Center in Springfield, Illinois. In November 2019 this event was added to the WWE Network as a hidden gem, which included an additional hour of footage covering the dark matches from the live event.

This episode aired as a special edition of WWF Prime Time Wrestling.

The opening match saw Tatanka, defeat the Repo Man via pinfall, following a Samoan drop.

Next, Marty Jannetty defeated The Brooklyn Brawler following a flying fistdrop.

During the third match, Kamala, pinned Red Tyler following a chop to the throat and a splash.

The fourth match saw Earthquake defeat Irwin R. Schyster via disqualification, when Ted DiBiase attempted to trip Earthquake while going for the sit-down splash.

The next saw Big Boss Man defeat Barry Horowitz with a "Sidewalk Slam".

The final match, saw The Headshrinkers defeat Red Fox & Royce Royal after Fatu hit a splash from the top rope.

| No. | Results | Stipulations | Times |
|---|---|---|---|
| 1 | Tatanka defeated Repo Man | Singles match | 7:42 |
| 2 | Marty Jannetty defeated The Brooklyn Brawler | Singles match | 4:58 |
| 3 | Kamala (w/ Harvey Wippleman & Kim Chee) defeated Red Tyler | Singles match | 3:27 |
| 4 | Earthquake defeated Irwin R. Schyster (w/ Jimmy Hart) by disqualification | Singles match | 11:01 |
| 5 | Big Boss Man defeated Barry Horowitz | Singles match | 3:27 |
| 6 | The Headshrinkers (Fatu & Samu) (w/ Afa) defeated Red Fox & Royce Royal | Tag team match | 2:42 |
| 7^{D} | Nailz defeated Big Boss Man | Singles match | — |
| 8^{D} | Bret Hart (c) defeated The Mountie by submission | Singles match for the WWF Championship | — |
| 9^{D} | Virgil defeated Bam Bam Bigelow by disqualification | Singles match | — |
| 10^{D} | Razor Ramon defeated Randy Savage by countout | Singles match | — |
| 11^{D} | Bret Hart (c) defeated Papa Shango by submission | Singles match for the WWF Championship | — |
| 12^{D} | The Ultimate Warrior defeated Nailz | Singles match | — |
(c) / – the champion(s) heading into the match; D / – this was a dark match

=== 1993 ===
Survivor Series Showdown
- Promotion: World Wrestling Federation
- Date: November 8, 1993; November 10, 1993 (aired November 21, 1993)
- City: Bushkill, Pennsylvania; Delhi, New York
- Venue: Fernwood Resort; Farrell Hall

Survivor Series Showdown chronology
| ← Previous; 1992 | Next → — |

Television special chronology
| ← Previous; SummerSlam Spectacular | Next → March to WrestleMania X |

The 1993 edition of Survivor Series Showdown aired on the USA Network on November 21, 1993. It was taped over the course of two days; the first two matches on November 8, 1993 from Fernwood Resort in Bushkill, Pennsylvania and the last two matches on November 10, 1993 from Farrell Hall in Delhi, New York.

In November 2018, this edition of Survivor Series Showdown was uploaded to the WWE Network as a Hidden Gem.

The first match saw Doink The Clown record a pinfall victory on Bastion Booger with a roll-up. Following the match, Doink put hot sauce on Booger's pizza, without him noticing, causing him to freak out upon eating the pizza.

The next match saw Crush defeat Virgil via submission with the "Cranium Crush".

Next, Irwin R. Schyster defeated Marty Jannetty following a "Write Off".

During the final match, for the WWF World Heavyweight Championship, Bret Hart had a sharpshooter applied on Yokozuna; however, Mr. Fuji hit Hart with the salt bucket behind the referees back. This caused Owen Hart to come out to save his brother; however, Bret was disqualified when Owen hit Yokozuna with the salt bucket.

| No. | Results | Stipulations | Times |
|---|---|---|---|
| 1 | Doink the Clown defeated Bastion Booger | Singles match | 7:37 |
| 2 | Crush (w/ Mr. Fuji) defeated Virgil by submission | Singles match | 7:55 |
| 3 | Irwin R. Schyster defeated Marty Jannetty | Singles match | 12:36 |
| 4 | Yokozuna (w/ Mr. Fuji) (c) defeated Bret Hart by disqualification | Singles match for the WWF Championship | 17:00 |
(c) / – the champion(s) heading into the match
