= SummerSlam Spectacular =

Series of World Wrestling Federation television specials

- Genre: Professional wrestling
- Created by: Vince McMahon
- Starring: World Wrestling Federation roster
- Country of origin: United States
- Original language: English
- No. of episodes: 3

Production
- Running time: 120 minutes
- Production company: World Wrestling Federation

Original release
- Network: USA Network
- Release: August 18, 1991 – August 22, 1993

SummerSlam Spectacular was a professional wrestling television program produced by the World Wrestling Federation (WWF). It aired on the USA Network, one week prior to that year's SummerSlam.

During this period, the WWF regularly ran specials to promote their pay-per-view events. Similar to this series, March to WrestleMania ran the week prior to that year's WrestleMania and Survivor Series Showdown before Survivor Series.

== SummerSlam Spectacular (1991) ==
SummerSlam Spectacular (1991)
- Promotion: World Wrestling Federation
- Date: July 29, 1991 (aired August 18, 1991)
- City: Worcester, Massachusetts
- Venue: Centrum in Worcester
- Attendance: 14,221

SummerSlam Spectacular chronology
← Previous —	Next → 1992

Television special chronology
← Previous; UK Rampage	Next → Battle Royal at the Albert Hall

SummerSlam Spectacular (1991) aired on the USA Network on August 18, 1991 (taped on July 29) from the Centrum in Worcester in Worcester, Massachusetts.

No.	Results	Stipulations	Times
1	Hawk defeated Brian Knobbs (with Jimmy Hart)	Singles match	9:12
2	Bret Hart defeated The Barbarian	Singles match	12:00
3	Irwin R. Schyster defeated Mark Thomas	Singles match	2:01
4	The British Bulldog, The Dragon, and The Texas Tornado defeated The Orient Express (Kato and Tanaka) and Sato (with Mr. Fuji)	Six-man tag team match	10:31
5	Hulk Hogan (c) defeated Sgt. Slaughter (with Col. Mustafa and Gen. Adnan) by disqualification	Singles match for the WWF World Heavyweight Championship	6:42
6	The Natural Disasters (Earthquake and Typhoon) defeated Ray Garcia and Russ Greenberg	Tag team match	2:15
7	Virgil defeated Masked Wrestler (with Sensational Sherri and Ted DiBiase)	Singles match	4:52
(c) / – the champion(s) heading into the match

== SummerSlam Spectacular (1992) ==
SummerSlam Spectacular (1992)
- Promotion: World Wrestling Federation
- Date: August 11, 1992 (aired August 23, 1992)
- City: Nashville, Tennessee
- Venue: Nashville Municipal Auditorium
- Attendance: ~7,500

SummerSlam Spectacular chronology
← Previous; 1991	Next → 1993

Television special chronology
← Previous; UK Rampage	Next → Saturday Night's Main Event XXXI

SummerSlam Spectacular (1992) aired on the USA Network on August 23, 1992 (taped on August 11) from the Nashville Municipal Auditorium in Nashville, Tennessee.

No.	Results	Stipulations	Times
1	Ric Flair (with Mr. Perfect) defeated El Matador	Singles match	14:00
2	Tatanka defeated Kato (with Mr. Fuji)	Singles match	8:40
3	Nailz defeated Ken Wayne	Singles match	3:48
4	The Nasty Boys (Brian Knobbs and Jerry Sags) (with Jimmy Hart) defeated Randy Savage and Ultimate Warrior by countout	Tag team match	10:00
5	Rick Martel defeated Joey Maggs	Singles match	2:43
6	Kamala (with Harvey Wippleman and Kim Chee) defeated Burt Stiles	Singles match	2:31
7	Money Inc. (Irwin R. Schyster and Ted DiBiase) (with Jimmy Hart) defeated The Bushwhackers (Bushwhacker Butch and Bushwhacker Luke)	Tag team match	5:50
8	Bret Hart defeated Skinner	Singles match	5:51

== SummerSlam Spectacular (1993) ==
SummerSlam Spectacular (1993)
- Promotion: World Wrestling Federation
- Date: August 16, 1993 (aired August 22, 1993)
- City: Poughkeepsie, New York
- Venue: Mid-Hudson Civic Center
- Attendance: ~3,000
- Tagline: Showdown in Motown

SummerSlam Spectacular chronology
← Previous; 1992	Next → —

Television special chronology
← Previous; UK Rampage	Next → Survivor Series Showdown

SummerSlam Spectacular (1993) aired on the USA Network on August 22, 1993 (taped on August 16) from the Mid-Hudson Civic Center in Poughkeepsie, New York. In August 2019, the event was added to the WWE Network as part of the Hidden Gem section.

No.	Results	Stipulations	Times
1	Yokozuna (with Mr. Fuji) defeated Jim Duggan	Singles match	6:08
2	Razor Ramon defeated Blake Beverly	Singles match	6:11
3	Tatanka and The Smoking Gunns (Billy and Bart) defeated Barry Horowitz, Reno Riggins and The Brooklyn Brawler	Six-man tag team match	7:04
4	Shawn Michaels (with Diesel) (c) defeated Bob Backlund	Singles match for the WWF Intercontinental Championship	9:22
5	Marty Jannetty defeated Dwayne Gill	Singles match	3:21
6	The Steiner Brothers (Rick and Scott) (c) defeated Money Inc. (Ted DiBiase and Irwin R. Schyster)	Steel Cage match for the WWF Tag Team Championship; Both members of either team need to escape the cage to win. If one member of either team escaped the cage, they can re-enter the cage.	17:58
(c) / – the champion(s) heading into the match
