= UK Rampage (1993) =

1993 World Wrestling Federation event

UK Rampage 1993
- Promotion: World Wrestling Federation
- Date: April 11, 1993
- City: Sheffield, England
- Venue: Sheffield Arena
- Attendance: 7,300

UK Rampage chronology
← Previous; 1992	Next → —

WWE in Europe chronology
← Previous; European Spring Tour (Exeter)	Next → European Spring Tour (Aberdeen)

Television special chronology
← Previous; March to WrestleMania IX	Next → SummerSlam Spectacular

The 1993 UK Rampage was a televised event produced by the World Wrestling Federation (WWF) as part of the WWF European spring tour of 1993. Of the eleven events taking place in the UK, the event on 11 April 1993 from the Sheffield Arena in Sheffield, England was aired live on Sky Sports and is what this article is about. It was the third and final UK Rampage named event. On February 5, 2018 UK Rampage 1993 became available on the WWE Network.

== Event ==
The event started with Lord Alfred Hayes introducing Bobby Heenan and their newest broadcast partner Jim Ross.

During the opening match, Fatu beat Brian Knobbs after a kick to the face in the corner, Fatu then cover with Afa holding Fatu’s foot for additional leverage.

Doink the Clown is then interviewed backstage by Alfred Hayes, who says he is happy that UK fans appreciate him. He goes on to insult Kamala and discuss how Crush saw double when the other Doink came out from under the ring at WrestleMania IX, before coming out to the ring for his match. Kamala was able to avoid Doink coming off the top, and hit him with the splash, however Kamala didn’t understand that Doink needed to be on his back to get a pin, which gave Doink a chance to recover. He utilized this opportunity to recover and when Kamala was arguing with the referee, Doink rolled up Kamala for the pinfall victory, using the tights for leverage.

While Samu made his way to the ring, Mr. Perfect was interviewed by Hayes backstage. Perfect stated although he was still seeing double from Lex Luger at WrestleMania IX, he had no doubt he could defeat Samu. After Samu attempted to hit the headbutt from the top rope, Perfect hit the Perfectplex for the victory.

The next match saw Bob Backlund defeat Damien Demento. As Demento went for a clothesline, Backlund ducked, and was able to pin Demento with a roll up and a backwards bridge for leverage.

The following match saw Typhoon face The Brooklyn Brawler. At the end of the match Brawler attempted to lift up Typhoon, however he was unable to lift him. Typhoon instead slammed Brawler, whipped him into the corner, and splashed into the corner after him, followed by another powerslam, to pick up the victory.

The second to last match saw WWF Intercontinental Champion Shawn Michaels defend his title against Crush. Toward the end of the match, as Crush signaled for the Cranium Crush, Michael rolled to the outside of the ring, grabbed his belt and headed to the back, losing the match via count-out. Crush followed Michael's toward the back and brought him back to the ring. After continuing to attack Michaels, Crush was able to knock Michaels out with the Cranium Crunch. Despite winning the match, but not the title, Crush celebrated in the ring following the match.

Prior to the last match, Heenan interviewed Mr. Fuji in the ring who stated that Yokozuna should be WWF World Heavyweight Champion, as the match with Hulk Hogan was never a sanctioned match.

The final match of the event saw Lex Luger defeat Jim Duggan. After both men collided in the ring, Duggan rolled to the outside. Duggan was attacked by Yokozuna who was still outside the ring, who then rolled him back into the ring, while Luger distracted the referee. As Luger went for the cover, Mr. Perfect ran back in and attacked Luger, causing the referee to disqualify Duggan. Luger and Yokozuna proceeded to double team Mr. Perfect until Duggan came back into the ring with his 2x4 chasing both men to the back.

== Results ==
No.	Results	Stipulations	Times
1	Fatu (with Afa) defeated Brian Knobbs	Singles match	9:43
2	Doink the Clown defeated Kamala	Singles match	5:54
3	Mr. Perfect defeated Samu (with Afa)	Singles match	13:34
4	Bob Backlund defeated Damien Demento	Singles match	7:56
5	Typhoon defeated The Brooklyn Brawler	Singles match	9:49
6	Crush defeated Shawn Michaels (c) by count-out	Singles match for the WWF Intercontinental Championship	8:51
7	Lex Luger defeated Jim Duggan by disqualification	Singles match	6:42
8^{D}	Jim Duggan defeated Yokozuna (with Mr. Fuji)	Singles match	3:17
(c) / – the champion(s) heading into the match; D / – this was a dark match

== See also ==
- 1993 in professional wrestling
- Professional wrestling in the United Kingdom
