= List of WWE television specials =

This is a list of televised professional wrestling special events from World Wrestling Entertainment (WWE). Throughout its broadcast history, the promotion has aired special events that have different themes. Some of them are yearly events such as the WWE draft and the Slammy Awards. Others include tributes to various professional wrestlers who have recently died or retired from actively performing.

== Past events ==
=== 1984 ===
Event	Date	Venue	Location	Main event	Notes	Ref
The Brawl to End It All	July 23	Madison Square Garden	New York City, New York	Wendi Richter vs. The Fabulous Moolah (c) for the WWF World Women's Championship		
(c) – refers to the champion(s) heading into the match

=== 1985 ===
Event	Date	Venue	Location	Main event	Notes	Ref
The War to Settle the Score	February 18	Madison Square Garden	New York City, New York	Hulk Hogan (c) vs. Roddy Piper for the WWF World Heavyweight Championship		
Saturday Night's Main Event	May 10 (aired May 11)	Nassau Coliseum	Uniondale, New York	Hulk Hogan (c) vs. Bob Orton for the WWF World Heavyweight Championship		
Saturday Night's Main Event II	October 3 (aired October 5)	Brendan Byrne Arena	East Rutherford, New Jersey	Hulk Hogan (c) vs. Nikolai Volkoff for the WWF World Heavyweight Championship		
Saturday Night's Main Event III	October 31 (aired November 2)	Hersheypark Arena	Hershey, Pennsylvania	Hulk Hogan and Andre the Giant vs. King Kong Bundy and Big John Studd		
(c) – refers to the champion(s) heading into the match

=== 1986 ===
Event	Date	Venue	Location	Main event	Notes	Ref
Saturday Night's Main Event IV	December 19, 1985 (aired January 4)	USF Sun Dome	Tampa, Florida	Hulk Hogan (c) vs.Terry Funk for the WWF World Heavyweight Championship		
Saturday Night's Main Event V	February 15 (aired March 1)	Arizona Veterans Memorial Coliseum	Phoenix, Arizona	Hulk Hogan (c) vs. The Magnificent Muraco for the WWF World Heavyweight Championship		
Saturday Night's Main Event VI	May 1 (aired May 3)	Providence Civic Center	Providence, Rhode Island	Hulk Hogan and Junkyard Dog vs. Terry Funk and Hoss Funk		
Saturday Night's Main Event VII	September 13 (aired October 4)	Richfield Coliseum	Richfield, Ohio	Hulk Hogan (c) vs. Paul Orndorff for the WWF World Heavyweight Championship		
Saturday Night's Main Event VIII	November 15 (aired November 29)	Los Angeles Memorial Sports Arena	Los Angeles, California	The Magnificent Muraco vs. Dick Slater		
(c) – refers to the champion(s) heading into the match

=== 1987 ===
Event	Date	Venue	Location	Main event	Notes	Ref
Saturday Night's Main Event IX	December 14, 1986 (aired January 3)	Hartford Civic Center	Hartford, Connecticut	Blackjack Mulligan vs. Jimmy Jack Funk		
Saturday Night's Main Event X	February 21 (aired March 14)	Joe Louis Arena	Detroit, Michigan	Ricky Steamboat vs. The Iron Sheik		
Saturday Night's Main Event XI	April 28 (aired May 2)	Edmund P. Joyce Center	Notre Dame, Indiana	The Can-Am Connection (Rick Martel and Tom Zenk) vs. Nikolai Volkoff and The Iron Sheik		
Saturday Night's Main Event XII	September 23 (aired October 3)	Hersheypark Arena	Hershey, Pennsylvania	The Hart Foundation (Bret Hart and Jim Neidhart) (c) vs. The Young Stallions (Paul Roma and Jim Powers) for the WWF Tag Team Championship		
Saturday Night's Main Event XIII	November 11 (aired November 28)	Seattle Center Coliseum	Seattle, Washington	Bam Bam Bigelow vs. Hercules		
(c) – refers to the champion(s) heading into the match

=== 1988 ===
Event	Date	Venue	Location	Main event	Notes	Ref
Saturday Night's Main Event XIV	December 7, 1987 (aired January 2)	Capital Centre	Landover, Maryland	Greg Valentine vs. Koko B. Ware		
Royal Rumble	January 24	Copps Coliseum	Hamilton, Ontario, Canada	20-man Battle royal in which Jim Duggan won		
The Main Event	February 5	Market Square Arena	Indianapolis, Indiana	Hulk Hogan (c) vs. Andre the Giant for the WWF World Heavyweight Championship		
Saturday Night's Main Event XV	March 7 (aired March 12)	Nashville Municipal Auditorium	Nashville, Tennessee	One Man Gang vs. Ken Patera		
Saturday Night's Main Event XVI	April 22 (aired April 30)	Springfield Civic Center	Springfield, Massachusetts	Koko B. Ware vs. Rick Rude		
Saturday Night's Main Event XVII	October 25 (aired October 29)	Baltimore Arena	Baltimore, Maryland	Jim Powers vs. Big Boss Man		
Saturday Night's Main Event XVIII	November 16 (aired November 26)	ARCO Arena	Sacramento, California	The Young Stallions (Paul Roma and Jim Powers) vs. The Fabulous Rougeaus (Jacques Rougeau and Raymond Rougeau)		
(c) – refers to the champion(s) heading into the match

=== 1989 ===
Event	Date	Venue	Location	Main event	Notes	Ref
Saturday Night's Main Event XIX	December 7, 1988 (aired January 7)	USF Sun Dome	Tampa, Florida	Koko B. Ware vs. Mr. Perfect		
The Main Event II	February 3	Bradley Center	Milwaukee, Wisconsin	Hercules vs. Ted DiBiase		
Saturday Night's Main Event XX	February 16 (aired March 11)	Hersheypark Arena	Hershey, Pennsylvania	The Brooklyn Brawler vs. The Red Rooster		
Saturday Night's Main Event XXI	April 25 (aired May 27)	Des Moines Veterans Memorial Auditorium	Des Moines, Iowa	Boris Zhukov vs. Jimmy Snuka		
Saturday Night's Main Event XXII	July 18 (aired July 29)	Worcester Centrum	Worcester, Massachusetts	Demolition (Ax and Smash) (c) vs. Brain Busters (Arn Anderson and Tully Blanchard) for the WWF Tag Team Championship		
Saturday Night's Main Event XXIII	September 21 (aired October 14)	Riverfront Coliseum	Cincinnati, Ohio	The Fabulous Rougeaus (Jacques Rougeau and Raymond Rougeau) vs. The Bushwhackers (Butch and Luke)		
WWF on Sky One	October 10	London Docklands Arena	London, England, UK	Randy Savage vs. Hulk Hogan	Aired exclusively in the United Kingdom on Sky One First WWF event in the United Kingdom	
Saturday Night's Main Event XXIV	October 31 (aired November 25)	Sunflower State Expocentre	Topeka, Kansas	The Brain Busters (Arn Anderson and Tully Blanchard) vs. The Rockers (Shawn Michaels and Marty Jannetty)		
Survivor Series Showdown	November 1 (aired November 12)	Kansas Coliseum	Park City, Kansas	Smash vs. Ted DiBiase		
(c) – refers to the champion(s) heading into the match

=== 1990 ===
Event	Date	Venue	Location	Main event	Notes	Ref
Saturday Night's Main Event XXV	January 3 (aired January 27)	UTC Arena	Chattanooga, Tennessee	Ron Garvin vs. Dino Bravo		
The Main Event III	February 23	Joe Louis Arena	Detroit, Michigan	Dino Bravo vs. Ultimate Warrior (c) for the WWF Intercontinental Championship		
The Ultimate Challenge	March 7 (aired March 25)	Cow Palace	Daly City, California	The Colossal Connection (Andre The Giant and Haku) vs. The Rockers (Marty Jannetty and Shawn Michaels)	Aired as a special episode of Prime Time Wrestling	
Wrestling Summit	April 13	Tokyo Dome	Tokyo, Japan	Hulk Hogan vs. Stan Hansen	Co-produced with All Japan Pro Wrestling and New Japan Pro-Wrestling	
Saturday Night's Main Event XXVI	April 23 (aired April 28)	Frank Erwin Center	Austin, Texas	Akeem vs. Big Boss Man		
Saturday Night's Main Event XXVII	July 16 (aired July 28)	Omaha Civic Auditorium	Omaha, Nebraska	Buddy Rose vs. The Texas Tornado		
SummerSlam Fever	August 15 (aired August 19)	Utica Memorial Auditorium	Utica, New York	Earthquake vs. Jim Duggan	Aired as a special episode of Prime Time Wrestling	
Saturday Night's Main Event XXVII	September 18 (aired October 13)	Toledo Sports Arena	Toledo, Ohio	The Texas Tornado vs. Buddy Rose		
The Main Event IV	October 30 (aired November 23)	Allen County War Memorial Coliseum	Fort Wayne, Indiana	Rick Martel vs. Tito Santana		
Survivor Series Showdown	October 29 (aired November 18)	Market Square Arena	Indianapolis, Indiana	The Texas Tornado (c) vs. Smash for the WWF Intercontinental Championship		

=== 1991 ===
Event	Date	Venue	Location	Notes	Ref
The Main Event V	January 28 (aired February 1)	Macon Coliseum	Macon, Georgia		
WrestleFest Tokyo	March 30	Tokyo Dome	Tokyo, Japan	Co-produced with Super World of Sports	
Saturday Night's Main Event XXIX	April 15 (aired April 27)	Omaha Civic Auditorium	Omaha, Nebraska		
UK Rampage	April 24	London Docklands Arena	London, England, UK		
SummerSlam Spectacular	July 29 (aired August 18)	Centrum in Worcester	Worcester, Massachusetts		
Battle Royal at the Albert Hall	October 10	Royal Albert Hall	London, England, UK		
Survivor Series Showdown	November 11 (aired November 24)	Utica Memorial Auditorium	Utica, New York		

=== 1992 ===
Event	Date	Venue	Location	Notes	Ref
Saturday Night's Main Event XXX	January 27 (aired February 8)	Lubbock Municipal Coliseum	Lubbock, Texas		
March To WrestleMania VIII	March 10 (aired March 29)	Mississippi Coast Coliseum	Biloxi, Mississippi		
UK Rampage	April 19	Sheffield Arena	Sheffield, England, UK		
SummerSlam Spectacular	August 11 (aired August 23)	Nashville Municipal Auditorium	Nashville, Tennessee		
Saturday Night's Main Event XXXI	October 27 (aired November 14)	Hulman Center	Terre Haute, Indiana		
Survivor Series Showdown	October 26 (aired November 22)	Prairie Capital Convention Center	Springfield, Illinois		

=== 1993 ===
Event	Date	Venue	Location	Notes	Ref
March to WrestleMania IX	March 7 (aired March 28)	Cumberland County Memorial Auditorium	Fayetteville, North Carolina		
UK Rampage	April 11	Sheffield Arena	Sheffield, England, UK		
SummerSlam Spectacular	August 16 (aired August 22)	Mid-Hudson Civic Center	Poughkeepsie, New York		
Survivor Series Showdown	November 8 November 10 (aired November 21)	Farrell Hall; Fernwood Resort	Delhi, New York; Bushkill, Pennsylvania		

=== 1994 ===
Event	Date	Venue	Location	Notes	Ref
March to WrestleMania X	February 21 (aired March 13)	Mid-Hudson Civic Center	Poughkeepsie, New York		

=== 1995 ===
Event	Date	Venue	Location	Notes	Ref
Raw Bowl	December 18 (aired January 1)	Bob Carpenter Center	Newark, Delaware		

=== 1996 ===
Event	Date	Venue	Location	Notes	Ref
WWF at the Sun City SuperBowl	September 14	Sun City SuperBowl	Sun City, South Africa		

=== 1997 ===
Event	Date	Venue	Location	Notes	Ref
Thursday Raw Thursday	February 13	Lowell Memorial Auditorium	Lowell, Massachusetts		
Friday Night's Main Event	August 23 (aired August 29)	Rosemont Horizon	Rosemont, Illinois	2-week replacement for Raw during USA Network's coverage of the US Open tennis tournament	
Friday Night's Main Event	August 23 (aired September 5)	Rosemont Horizon	Rosemont, Illinois	2-week replacement for Raw during USA Network's coverage of the US Open tennis tournament	

=== 1999 ===
Event	Date	Venue	Location	Notes	Ref
Halftime Heat	January 26 (aired January 31)	Tucson Convention Center	Tucson, Arizona	Aired as counterprogramming for the Super Bowl XXXIII half time show	
Raw Saturday Night	February 8 (aired February 13)	SkyDome	Toronto, Ontario, Canada		

=== 2000 ===
Event	Date	Venue	Location	Notes	Ref
New Year's Raw	January 3	American Airlines Arena	Miami, Florida		
Thanksgiving SmackDown	November 21 (aired November 23)	National Car Rental Center	Fort Lauderdale, Florida		
Christmas SmackDown	December 19 (aired December 21)	Charlotte Coliseum	Charlotte, North Carolina		

=== 2001 ===
Event	Date	Venue	Location	Notes	Ref
SmackDown Xtreme	January 30 (aired February 1)	Nationwide Arena	Columbus, Ohio		

=== 2002 ===
Event	Date	Venue	Location	Notes	Ref
SmackDown! Tour in Japan	March 1 (aired March 30)	Yokohama Arena	Yokohama, Kanagawa, Japan	Aired on TV Tokyo in Japan	
Raw Roulette	October 7	Thomas & Mack Center	Paradise, Nevada	Aired as a special episode of Raw	
Super Tuesday	November 5 (aired November 12)	Verizon Wireless Arena	Manchester, New Hampshire		

=== 2003 ===
Event	Date	Venue	Location	Notes	Ref
Raw Roulette	November 24	E Center	West Valley City, Utah	Aired as a special episode of Raw	
Spike TV Video Game Awards	December 2, 2003	MGM Grand Garden Arena	Las Vegas, Nevada		

=== 2004 ===
Event	Date	Venue	Location	Notes	Ref
Tribute To The Troops	December 18 (aired December 23)	Camp Speicher	Tikrit, Iraq	Aired as a special episode of SmackDown	

=== 2005 ===
Event	Date	Venue	Location	Notes	Ref
Raw Homecoming	October 3	American Airlines Center	Dallas, Texas		
Tribute to the Troops	December 9 (aired December 19)	Bagram Air Base	Bagram, Afghanistan	Aired as a special episode of Raw	

=== 2006 ===
Event	Date	Venue	Location	Notes	Ref
Saturday Night's Main Event XXXII	March 18	Cobo Arena	Detroit, Michigan		
WWE vs. ECW Head-to-Head	June 7	Nutter Center	Dayton, Ohio		
Saturday Night's Main Event XXXIII	July 15	American Airlines Center	Dallas, Texas		
Tribute to the Troops	December 7 (aired December 25)	Camp Victory	Baghdad, Iraq	Aired as a special episode of Raw	

=== 2007 ===
Event	Date	Venue	Location	Notes	Ref
Saturday Night's Main Event XXXIV	May 28 (aired June 2)	Air Canada Centre	Toronto, Ontario, Canada		
Saturday Night's Main Event XXXV	August 13 (aired August 18)	Madison Square Garden	New York City, New York		
Tribute to the Troops	December 7 (aired December 24)	Camp Victory	Baghdad, Iraq	Aired as a special episode of Raw	

=== 2008 ===
Event	Date	Venue	Location	Notes	Ref
Raw Roulette	January 7	Mohegan Sun Arena	Uncasville, Connecticut	Aired as a special episode of Raw	
King of the Ring	April 21	BI-LO Center	Greenville, South Carolina	Aired as a special episode of Raw	
Saturday Night's Main Event XXXV	July 28 (aired August 2)	Verizon Center	Washington, D.C.		
Tribute to the Troops	December 5 (aired December 20)	Camp Victory	Baghdad, Iraq		

=== 2009 ===
Event	Date	Venue	Location	Notes	Ref
Tribute to the Troops	December 4 (aired December 19)	Holt Memorial Stadium at Balad Air Base	Balad, Iraq		

=== 2010 ===
Event	Date	Venue	Location	Notes	Ref
Viewer's Choice Raw	June 7	American Airlines Arena	Miami, Florida	Aired as a special episode of Raw	
Raw Roulette	September 13	U.S. Bank Arena	Cincinnati, Ohio	Aired as a special episode of Raw	
King of the Ring	November 29	Wells Fargo Center	Philadelphia, Pennsylvania	Aired as a special episode of Raw	
Tribute to the Troops	December 9 (aired December 19)	Fort Hood	Killeen, Texas		

=== 2011 ===
Event	Date	Venue	Location	Notes	Ref
Power to the People	June 20	Baltimore Arena	Baltimore, Maryland	Aired as a special episode of Raw	
Tribute to the Troops	December 9 (aired December 19)	Norfolk Scope	Norfolk, Virginia		

=== 2012 ===
Event	Date	Venue	Location	Notes	Ref
Sin City SmackDown	January 17 (aired January 20)	Thomas & Mack Center	Paradise, Nevada	Aired as a special episode of SmackDown	
The Great American Bash	July 3	American Bank Center	Corpus Christi, Texas	Aired as a special episode of SmackDown	
Tribute to the Troops	December 11 (aired December 13)	Crown Coliseum	Fayetteville, North Carolina		

=== 2013 ===
Event	Date	Venue	Location	Notes	Ref
Raw Roulette	January 28	Bridgestone Arena	Nashville, Tennessee	Aired as a special episode of Raw	
NXT Road to WrestleMania	February 21 (aired March 27)	Full Sail University	Winter Park, Florida	Aired as a special episode of NXT	
NXT Clash of the Champions	March 21 (aired April 24)	Full Sail University	Winter Park, Florida	Aired as a special episode of NXT	
Social Media SmackDown	March 1	Chesapeake Energy Arena	Oklahoma City, Oklahoma	Aired as a special episode of SmackDown	
Raw Country	November 18	Bridgestone Arena	Nashville, Tennessee	Aired as a special episode of Raw	
Tribute to the Troops	December 11 (aired December 17)	Joint Base Lewis-McChord	Tacoma, Washington		

=== 2014 ===
Event	Date	Venue	Location	Notes	Ref
NXT Vengeance	March 28 (aired March 27)	Full Sail University	Winter Park, Florida	Aired as a special episode of NXT	
NXT Clash of the Champions	March 21 (aired March 24)	Full Sail University	Winter Park, Florida	Aired as a special episode of NXT	
Tribute to the Troops	December 11 (aired December 17)	Columbus Civic Center	Columbus, Georgia		

=== 2015 ===
Event	Date	Venue	Location	Notes	Ref
Arnold Sports Festival	March 5 (aired March 18)	Lifestyle Communities Pavilion	Columbus, Ohio	Aired as a special episode of NXT	
WrestleMania Axxess	March 26 (aired April 8)	San Jose McEnery Convention Center	San Jose, California	Aired as a special episode of NXT	
The Beast in the East	July 4	Ryōgoku Kokugikan	Tokyo, Japan	Simulcast on the WWE Network and J Sports	
Tribute to the Troops	December 8 (aired December 23)	Jacksonville Veterans Memorial Arena	Jacksonville, Florida		

=== 2016 ===
Event	Date	Venue	Location	Main event	Notes	Ref
WrestleMania Axxess	April 1 (aired April 6)	Kay Bailey Hutchison Convention Center	Dallas, Texas	Apollo Crews vs. Elias Samson		
WrestleMania Axxess	April 2 (aired April 13, April 20, and April 27)	Kay Bailey Hutchison Convention Center	Dallas, Texas	Shinsuke Nakamura vs. Elias Samson		
Tribute to the Troops	December 13 (aired December 14)	Verizon Center	Washington, D.C.			

=== 2017 ===
Event	Date	Venue	Location	Notes	Ref
Tribute to the Troops	December 5 (aired December 14)	Naval Base San Diego	San Diego, California		

=== 2018 ===
Event	Date	Venue	Location	Notes	Ref
Raw 25	January 22	Brooklyn, New York; New York City, New York	Barclays Center; Manhattan Center	Celebrated the 25th anniversary of Monday Night Raw	
Tribute to the Troops	December 4 (aired December 20)	Fort Hood	Killeen, Texas		

=== 2019 ===
Event	Date	Venue	Location	Notes	Ref
Superstar Shake-up	April 15	Bell Centre	Montreal, Quebec, Canada		
Superstar Shake-up	April 16	Bell Centre	Montreal, Quebec, Canada		
King of the Ring Kickoff	August 19	Xcel Energy Center	Saint Paul, Minnesota	Aired as a special episode of Raw	
King of the Ring Semi-finals	September 9	Madison Square Garden	New York City, New York	Aired as a special episode of Raw	
King of the Ring Semi-finals	September 10	Madison Square Garden	New York City, New York	Aired as a special episode of SmackDown	
King of the Ring Finals	September 16	Thompson-Boling Arena	Knoxville, Tennessee	Aired as a special episode of Raw	
WWE Draft	October 11	T-Mobile Arena	Paradise, Nevada	Aired as a special episode of SmackDown	
WWE Draft	October 14	Pepsi Center	Denver, Colorado	Aired as a special episode of Raw	

=== 2020 ===
Event	Date	Venue	Location	Notes	Ref
NXT The Great American Bash	July 1	Full Sail University	Winter Park, Florida	Aired as a special episode of NXT	
NXT The Great American Bash	July 1 (aired July 8)	Full Sail University	Winter Park, Florida	Aired as a special episode of NXT	
NXT Super Tuesday	August 26 (aired September 1)	Full Sail University	Winter Park, Florida	Aired as a special episode of NXT	
NXT Super Tuesday	September 8	Full Sail University	Winter Park, Florida	Aired as a special episode of NXT	
NXT Takeoff to TakeOver	September 23	WWE Performance Center	Orlando, Florida	Aired as a special episode of NXT	
NXT Halloween Havoc	October 28	WWE Performance Center	Orlando, Florida	Aired as a special episode of NXT	

=== 2021 ===
Event	Date	Venue	Location	Notes	Ref
NXT: New Year's Evil	January 6	WWE Performance Center	Orlando, Florida	Aired as a special episode of NXT	
Superstar Spectacle	January 22 (aired January 26)	Tropicana Field	St. Petersburg, Florida	Simulcast on the WWE Network, Sony Max, Sony Ten 1, and Sony Ten 3	
NXT TakeOver: Stand & Deliver	April 7	WWE Performance Center	Orlando, Florida	Simulcast on the WWE Network and USA Network	
WrestleMania SmackDown	April 9	Tropicana Field	St. Petersburg, Florida	Aired as a special episode of SmackDown	
Throwback SmackDown	May 7	Yuengling Center	Tampa, Florida	Aired as a special episode of SmackDown	
Rolling Loud SmackDown	July 23	Rocket Mortgage FieldHouse; Hard Rock Stadium	Cleveland, Ohio; Miami Gardens, Florida	Aired as a special episode of SmackDown	
NXT The Great American Bash	July 6	WWE Performance Center	Orlando, Florida	Aired as a special episode of NXT	
Tribute to the Troops	October 15 (aired November 14)	Toyota Arena	Ontario, California		
NXT Halloween Havoc	October 26	WWE Performance Center	Orlando, Florida	Aired as a special episode of NXT	

=== 2022 ===
Event	Date	Venue	Location	Notes	Ref
NXT New Year's Evil 2022	January 4	WWE Performance Center	Orlando, Florida		
Tribute to the Troops	November 11 (aired December 17)	Gainbridge Fieldhouse	Indianapolis, Indiana		

=== 2023 ===
Event	Date	Venue	Location	Notes	Ref
New Year's Evil 2023	January 10	WWE Performance Center	Orlando, Florida	Aired as a special episode of NXT	
RAW is XXX	January 23	Wells Fargo Center	Philadelphia, Pennsylvania	Aired as a special episode of Raw	
NXT Roadblock	March 7	WWE Performance Center	Orlando, Florida	Aired as a special episode of NXT	
WrestleMania 39 SmackDown	March 31	Crypto.com Arena	Los Angeles, California	Aired as a special episode of SmackDown	
NXT Spring Breakin'	April 25	WWE Performance Center	Orlando, Florida	Aired as a special episode of NXT	
Gold Rush	June 20	WWE Performance Center	Orlando, Florida	Aired as a special episode of NXT	
Gold Rush	June 27	WWE Performance Center	Orlando, Florida	Aired as a special episode of NXT	
NXT Heatwave	August 22	WWE Performance Center	Orlando, Florida	Aired as a special episode of NXT	
NXT Halloween Havoc	October 24	WWE Performance Center	Orlando, Florida	Aired as a special episode of NXT	
NXT Halloween Havoc	October 31	WWE Performance Center	Orlando, Florida	Aired as a special episode of NXT	
Tribute to the Troops	December 8	Amica Mutual Pavilion	Providence, Rhode Island	Aired as a special episode of SmackDown	

=== 2024 ===
Event	Date	Venue	Location	Notes	Ref
Raw: Day 1	January 1	Pechanga Arena	San Diego, California	Aired as a special episode of Raw	
NXT New Year's Evil	January 2	WWE Performance Center	Orlando, Florida	Aired as a special episode of NXT	
New Year's Revolution	January 5	Rogers Arena	Vancouver, British Columbia, Canada	Aired as a special episode of SmackDown	
NXT Roadblock	March 5	WWE Performance Center	Orlando, Florida	Aired as a special episode of NXT	
NXT Spring Breakin'	April 23	WWE Performance Center	Orlando, Florida	Aired as a special episode of NXT	
NXT Spring Breakin'	April 24	WWE Performance Center	Orlando, Florida	Aired as a special episode of NXT	
NXT The Great American Bash	July 30	WWE Performance Center	Orlando, Florida	Aired as a special episode of NXT	
NXT The Great American Bash	August 6	WWE Performance Center	Orlando, Florida	Aired as a special episode of NXT	
NXT 2300	November 6	2300 Arena	Philadelphia, Pennsylvania	Aired as a special episode of NXT	
Saturday Night's Main Event XXXVII	December 14	Nassau Veterans Memorial Coliseum	Uniondale, New York	Simulcast on NBC and Peacock; Main Event: Cody Rhodes (c) vs. Kevin Owens	
Raw's farewell to the USA Network	December 30	Toyota Center	Houston, Texas	Aired as a special episode of Raw	

=== 2025 ===
Event	Date	Venue	Location	Notes	Ref
Raw's Netflix Premiere	January 6	Intuit Dome	Inglewood, California	Aired as a special episode of Raw	
NXT New Year's Evil	January 7	Shrine Expo Hall	Los Angeles, California	Aired as a special episode of NXT	
Saturday Night's Main Event XXXVIII	January 25	Frost Bank Center	San Antonio, Texas	Simulcast on NBC and Peacock	
NXT Roadblock	March 13	The Theater at Madison Square Garden	New York City, New York	Aired as a special episode of NXT	
WrestleMania 41 SmackDown	April 18	T-Mobile Arena	Paradise, Nevada	Aired as a special episode of SmackDown	
WrestleMania 41 Fallout Raw	April 21	T-Mobile Arena	Paradise, Nevada	Aired as a special episode of Raw	
WrestleMania 41 Fallout NXT	April 21	Fontainebleau Las Vegas	Winchester, Nevada	Aired as a special episode of NXT	
Saturday Night's Main Event XXXIX	May 24	Yuengling Center	Tampa, Florida	Simulcast on NBC and Peacock	
Saturday Night's Main Event XL	July 12	State Farm Arena	Atlanta, Georgia	Simulcast on NBC and Peacock	
SummerSlam Smackdown	August 1	Prudential Center	Newark, New Jersey	Aired as a special episode of SmackDown	
SummerSlam Raw	August 4	Barclays Center	Brooklyn, New York	Aired as a special episode of Raw	
Clash in Paris SmackDown	August 29	LDLC Arena	Décines-Charpieu, France	Aired as a special episode of SmackDown	
Clash in Paris Raw	September 1	Paris La Défense Arena	Nanterre, France	Aired as a special episode of Raw	
NXT Homecoming	September 16	Full Sail University	Winter Park, Florida	Aired as a special episode of NXT	
Succession	September 23 and 30 (aired October 15)	WWE Performance Center	Orlando, Florida	Aired as a special episode of Evolve	
NXT vs. TNA Showdown	October 7	WWE Performance Center	Orlando, Florida	Aired as a special episode of NXT; Co-produced with Total Nonstop Action Wrestling	
NXT Gold Rush	November 18	The Theater at Madison Square Garden	New York City, New York	Tatum Paxley (w/Izzi Dame, Niko Vance, and Shawn Spears) (c) vs. Jacy Jayne (w/Fallon Henley and Lainey Reid) for the WWE NXT Women's Championship	Co-produced with Lucha Libre AAA Worldwide and Total Nonstop Action Wrestling
NXT Gold Rush	November 18 (aired November 25)	The Theater at Madison Square Garden	New York City, New York	Trick Williams vs. Myles Borne in an Iron Survivor Challenge qualifying match	Co-produced with Lucha Libre AAA Worldwide and Total Nonstop Action Wrestling

=== 2026 ===
Event	Date	Venue	Location	Notes	Ref
Raw is Stranger Things	January 5	Barclays Center	New York City, New York		
NXT New Year's Evil	January 6	WWE Performance Center	Orlando, Florida		
Succession II	January 30 (aired March 4)	WWE Performance Center	Orlando, Florida	Aired as a special episode of WWE Evolve	
Royal Rumble SmackDown	January 31	Riyadh Season Stadium	Riyadh, Saudi Arabia		
Booker T Appreciation Night	March 17	713 Music Hall	Houston, Texas		
WrestleMania 41 SmackDown	April 17	T-Mobile Arena	Paradise, Nevada		
WrestleMania 41 Fallout Raw	April 20	T-Mobile Arena	Paradise, Nevada		
Succession III	May 29, 2026 (aired June 24, 2026)	WWE Performance Center	Orlando, Florida	Aired as a special episode of WWE Evolve	
SummerSlam Fallout	August 3	Casey's Center	Des Moines, Iowa	Aired as a special episode of WWE Raw	

== Upcoming events ==
Event	Date	Venue	Location	Notes	Ref
