= March to WrestleMania =

Series of World Wrestling Federation television specials

- Genre: Professional wrestling
- Created by: Vince McMahon
- Starring: World Wrestling Federation roster
- Country of origin: United States
- Original language: English
- No. of episodes: 3

Production
- Running time: 120 minutes
- Production company: World Wrestling Federation

Original release
- Network: USA Network
- Release: March 29, 1992 – March 13, 1994

March to WrestleMania is a professional wrestling television program that was produced by the World Wrestling Federation (WWF). Three separate specials aired one week prior to that year's respective WrestleMania.

During the late 80s and early 90s, the WWF regularly ran specials on the USA Network to promote their pay-per-view events. Similar to this series, Survivor Series Showdown and SummerSlam Spectacular also ran the week prior to that year's Survivor Series and SummerSlam, respectively.

== March to WrestleMania VIII ==
March to WrestleMania VIII
- Promotion: World Wrestling Federation
- Date: March 10, 1992 (aired March 29, 1992)
- City: Biloxi, Mississippi
- Venue: Mississippi Coast Coliseum

March to WrestleMania chronology
← Previous —	Next → IX

Television special chronology
← Previous; Saturday Night's Main Event XXX	Next → UK Rampage

March to WrestleMania VIII aired on USA Network as a special episode of WWF Prime Time Wrestling on March 29, 1992, 7 days prior to WrestleMania VIII. It was filmed on March 10 in Biloxi, Mississippi.

During the first match, Shawn Michaels faced Roddy Piper, the current WWF Intercontinental Champion, in a non-title match. Piper was disqualified when referee Earl Hebner caught Piper attempting to utilize Sensational Sherri's boot as a weapon.

Following the match, a video package aired focusing on the history between Randy Savage, Ric Flair, and Miss Elizabeth.

The next match was again a non-title match, in which WWF World Champion Ric Flair took on Jim Brunzell. Flair would pick up the victory when Brunzell submitted to the figure-four leglock.

Next Jake Roberts defeated Jim Powers following a DDT.

In the final match The Natural Disasters (Earthquake and Typhoon) defeated Kato & Barry Horowitz via pinfall after Earthquake hit the sit-down splash on Horowitz.

The show also featured segments throughout with a tribute to Hulk Hogan as his match with Sid Justice at WrestleMania VIII was being billed as his possible retirement match. A sit-down interview between Hogan and Vince McMahon was shown as well as past WrestleMania matches pitting Hogan against André the Giant (WrestleMania III) and Ultimate Warrior (WrestleMania VI). These matches had new commentary with Gorilla Monsoon and Bobby Heenan.

No.	Results	Stipulations	Times
1	Shawn Michaels (with Sensational Sherri) defeated Roddy Piper by disqualification	Singles match	08:00
2	Ric Flair (with Mr. Perfect) defeated Jim Brunzell by submission	Singles match	03:59
3	Jake Roberts defeated Jim Powers	Singles match	03:07
4	The Natural Disasters (Earthquake and Typhoon) defeated Kato & Barry Horowitz	Tag team match	01:57

== March to WrestleMania IX ==
March to WrestleMania IX
- Promotion: World Wrestling Federation
- Date: March 7, 1993 (aired March 28, 1993)
- City: Fayetteville, North Carolina
- Venue: Cumberland County Memorial Auditorium

March to WrestleMania chronology
← Previous; VIII	Next → X

Television special chronology
← Previous; Survivor Series Showdown	Next → UK Rampage

March to WrestleMania IX aired on USA Network on March 28, 1993, 7 days prior to WrestleMania IX. It was filmed on March 7 at the Cumberland County Memorial Auditorium in Fayetteville, North Carolina. In March 2019 it was uploaded to the WWE Network as a hidden gem.

In the opening match Yokozuna faced Randy Savage. After Mr. Fuji hit Savage with the Japanese flag, while he was on the top rope, Yokozuna hit a belly to belly suplex to pick up the win. Following the match Yokozuna set Savage up for the "Bonzai Drop" however Savage was able to move. Savage then hit Yokozuna with a running knee, sending him to the outside. Various officials came out to break the two up and brought Yokozuna to the back.

During the second match Mr. Perfect pinned Skinner with the "Perfect Plex".

Next Kamala pinned Kim Chee following a splash.

In the following match WWF Tag Team Champions Money Inc. (Irwin R. Schyster & Ted DiBiase) took on Jerry Sabin & Reno Riggins in a non-title tag team match. Money Inc. picked up the victory after DiBiase was able to get the "Million Dollar Dream" on Riggins.

Next Tatanka defeated George South via pinfall after hitting the Samaon Drop. Following the match Shawn Michaels came out to attack Tatanka, however Tatanka sent Michaels immediately to the outside with a chop.

A six-man tag team match was next, which saw The Bushwhackers (Butch & Luke) & Tiger Jackson defeating Little Louie & The Beverly Brothers (Beau Beverly & Blake Beverly). The match ended when Jackson hit a crossbody on Louie, followed by a pin.

The final match saw The Undertaker take on Bam Bam Bigelow. After Undertaker hit a chokeslam on Bigelow, who then left the arena and was counted out. After the match Giant Gonzalez and Harvey Wippleman appeared on the ramp, however referees kept the two separated.

No.	Results	Stipulations	Times
1	Yokozuna (with Mr. Fuji) defeated Randy Savage	Singles match	6:36
2	Mr. Perfect defeated Skinner	Singles match	5:27
3	Kamala (with Reverend Slick) defeated Kim Chee	Singles match	2:10
4	Money Inc. (Irwin R. Schyster & Ted DiBiase) defeated Jerry Sabin and Reno Riggins	Tag team match	2:55
5	Tatanka defeated George South	Singles match	3:16
6	The Bushwhackers (Butch & Luke) & Tiger Jackson defeated Little Louie & The Beverly Brothers (Beau Beverly & Blake Beverly)	Six man tag team match	9:57
7	The Undertaker (with Paul Bearer) defeated Bam Bam Bigelow by countout	Singles match	7:39

== March to WrestleMania X ==
March to WrestleMania X
- Promotion: World Wrestling Federation
- Date: February 21, 1994; February 23, 1994 (aired March 13, 1994)
- City: Poughkeepsie, New York; Loch Sheldrake, New York
- Venue: Mid-Hudson Civic Center; Sullivan County Community College

March to WrestleMania chronology
← Previous; IX	Next → —

Television special chronology
← Previous; Survivor Series Showdown	Next → —

March to WrestleMania X aired on USA Network on March 13, 1994, seven days prior to WrestleMania X. Some of the matches for the special were filmed on February 21 in Poughkeepsie, New York, while the remaining were filmed two days later in Loch Sheldrake, New York. The following night, a 1-hour version aired in place of ‘’WWE Raw’’. In March 2019 it was uploaded to the WWE Network as a hidden gem.

The first match of the event saw Lex Luger defeat Jimmy Del Ray by submission with the torture rack. Following the match Yokozuna and Mr. Fuji came out and stared Luger down.

The second match saw Bam Bam Bigelow pin Ben Jordan.

The next match was for the WWF Intercontinental Championship, which saw Razor Ramon defend the title against Tony DeVito. Ramon successfully retained the title via pinfall after hitting the "Razor's Edge".

Next, Earthquake defeated The Executioner following a sit down splash.

Following match saw Crush taking on Bret Hart. While Hart had an inside cradle on Crush, Mr. Fuji distracted the referee, allowing Owen Hart to reverse the inside cradle.

The next match was for the WWF World Tag Team Championship, which saw The Quebecers (Jacques & Pierre) defending against Mike Bell & PJ Walker. The Quebecers retained the titles after a top rope leg drop while having Bell in a Boston Crab.

The final match saw Yokozuna, the WWF World Champion, take on Tatanka in a non-title match. Yokozuna picked up the victory following a belly to belly suplex and the "Bonzai Drop".

No.	Results	Stipulations	Times
1	Lex Luger defeated Jimmy Del Ray (with Jim Cornette & Tom Prichard) by submission	Singles match	8:36
2	Bam Bam Bigelow (with Luna Vachon) defeated Ben Jordan	Singles match	3:37
3	Razor Ramon (c) defeated Tony DeVito	Singles match for the WWF Intercontinental Championship	4:11
4	Earthquake defeated The Executioner	Singles match	1:58
5	Crush (with Mr. Fuji) defeated Bret Hart	Singles match	12:41
6	The Quebecers (Jacques & Pierre) (c) defeated Mike Bell & PJ Walker	Tag team match for the WWF World Tag Team Championship	4:11
7	Yokozuna (with Jim Cornette & Mr. Fuji) defeated Tatanka	Singles match	9:20
(c) / – the champion(s) heading into the match

== Legacy ==
In 2016 the March to WrestleMania name was expected to return, however the WWE Network event was renamed to Roadblock.
