= Brian Costello (wrestler) =

American professional wrestler (born 1963)

Personal information
- Born: Brian Woodworth; October 21, 1963 (age 62) South Bend, Indiana, U.S.

Professional wrestling career
- Ring name(s): Brian Costello; Terry Thomas
- Billed height: 6 ft 0 in (1.83 m)
- Billed weight: 260 lb (120 kg)
- Trained by: Tom Lynch; Bobby Golden
- Debut: 1982
- Retired: 2019

Brian Woodworth (born October 21, 1963) is an American retired professional wrestler better known by his ring name Brian Costello best known working in the World Wrestling Federation from 1986 to 1993.

== Professional wrestling career ==
Costello began his professional wrestling debut in 1982. Early in his career he worked in Indianapolis and in Minnesota for American Wrestling Association.

He made his debut in the World Wrestling Federation as an enhancement talent on November 19, 1986, losing to Salvatore Bellomo in a dark match. Costello was now firmly established as an enhancement talent, losing to Don Muraco, Jake Roberts, The Ultimate Warrior, Dusty Rhodes, Shawn Michaels, Owen Hart and Razor Ramon.

Costello's most memorable match during his WWF run was against Andre the Giant, which took place during a March 1988 television taping for WWF Superstars of Wrestling. The match – merely a setup to have Hacksaw Jim Duggan come to the ring, confront Andre and begin their feud – lasted less than 30 seconds, and involved Andre grabbing Costello and headbutting him twice before throwing him from the ring.

In the early-1990s, Costello began appearing for the Indiana-based International Association of Wrestling alongside a number of ex-AWA and WWF wrestlers. On July 24, 1993, Costello teamed with The Iron Sheik to beat IAW Tag Team Champions Paul Roma and Repo Man for the belts in South Bend, Indiana. On November 10, Costello also defeated Roma in Laporte, Indiana to win the IAW Heavyweight Championship. Ten days later, his last match for the WWF took place on November 20, 1993, losing to The Brooklyn Brawler at a house show in Grand Rapids, Michigan. Costello's first title reign ended the following month when he lost to Greg "The Hammer" Valentine in Lima, Ohio on December 6, 1993.

Costello and The Iron Sheik also lost the IAW Tag Team Championship to The Texas Hangmen (Psycho and Killer) in Fort Wayne, Indiana but regained the belts in Kalamazoo, Michigan on February 15, 1994. They lost the tag titles to Trevor Adonis and Steve Regal in Laporte, Indiana on June 4, 1994. He won the IAW Heavyweight title a second time from The Barbarian in Mishawaka, Indiana on July 23, 1994, and held it for nearly two months before dropping the belt to Paul Roma in Nappanee, Indiana on September 16, 1994. That same year, he went to Japan working for All Japan Pro Wrestling and later World Championship Wrestling.

Back in the IAW, Costello teamed with The Iron Sheik to win the IAW Tag Team Championship for a third time. They defeated Paul Roma and Hercules for the belts in Toledo, Ohio on February 3, 1996, and lost them to The Texas Hangmen in Niles, Michigan on June 28, 1996. He also won the IAW Heavyweight title a third time by defeating Hercules in Erie, Pennsylvania on August 24. While IAW Heavyweight Champion, Costello formed a tag team with Greg Valentine and entered a three-way feud with The Texas Hangmen and IAW Tag Team Champions Demolition Ax and Typhoon. Costello's former partner, The Iron Sheik, later turned on Costello and attempted to capture his IAW title. He returned to the WWF for one match losing to The Stalker on October 22, 1996. On February 15, 1997, Costello lost the IAW Heavyweight Championship to Cousin Bubba in Fairmount, Indiana but regained it in Niles, Michigan on August 23, 1997. Costello's fourth title reign lasted for several years and included winning the IAW Tag Team Championship.

Later in his career, he worked in the independents until retiring in 2019. In April 2017, Costello was hired as head of security for the South Bend Cubs.

== Championships and accomplishments ==
- Championship International Wrestling
  - CIW Heavyweight Championship (1 time)
  - CIW Tag Team Championship (2 times) - with Cousin Bubba (1) and Nick Lawless (1)
- International Association of Wrestling
  - IAW Heavyweight Championship (5 times)
  - IAW Tag Team Championship (5 times) - with The Iron Sheik (3), The Ripper (1) and Nasty Nick (1)
- Pro Wrestling Illustrated
  - PWI ranked him # 488 of the 500 best singles wrestlers of the PWI 500 in 1998
  - PWI ranked him # 402 of the 500 best singles wrestlers of the PWI 500 in 1999
  - PWI ranked him # 449 of the 500 best singles wrestlers of the PWI 500 in 2000
  - PWI ranked him # 490 of the 500 best singles wrestlers of the PWI 500 in 2005
