= Battle Royal at the Albert Hall =

1991 World Wrestling Federation event

- VHS cover featuring The Road Warriors
- Promotion: World Wrestling Federation
- Date: 3 October 1991
- City: London, England
- Venue: Royal Albert Hall
- Attendance: 5,000

WWE in Europe chronology
← Previous; UK Rampage (Wembley)	Next → European Rampage Tour (Wembley)

Television special chronology
← Previous; SummerSlam Spectacular	Next → Survivor Series Showdown

Battle Royal at the Albert Hall was a live professional wrestling event produced by the World Wrestling Federation (WWF, now known as WWE) that took place on 3 October 1991 at the Royal Albert Hall in London, England. It was the first event of the 1991 WWF European Rampage Tour. The event was televised on Sky Movies Plus and later released on VHS and DVD.

The main event was a 20-man battle royal which was won by The British Bulldog, last eliminating Typhoon. The other matches were singles matches, and tag team matches, including a tag team match for the WWF Tag Team Championship.

== Premise ==
The Battle Royal at the Albert Hall was the first event of the WWF's first Europe-wide tour. The European Rampage Tour took place over seven consecutive days in October 1991, and after this event went to London (Wembley Arena), Barcelona, Brussels, Sheffield, Birmingham and Paris. Of these, only the London (Royal Albert Hall) and Barcelona (Palau Sant Jordi) events were televised, the latter on Telecinco.

'Lord' Alfred Hayes provided guest commentary for the contest.

For his victory in the main event, the British Bulldog was awarded the "Royal Samovar Trophy", a two-handled samovar, still functioning with its tap intact.

== Legacy ==
This event is significant for featuring one of Andre The Giant's last live wrestling appearances and the last video of him before his death in January 1993. Andre arrives at the end of the Battle Royal to save winner British Bulldog from an attack by the Natural Disasters, Earthquake and Typhoon.

== Home video and streaming ==
The event was released on VHS by Silver Vision in the United Kingdom in November 1992, an unusually short turn around time between the event and the video release. Early copies of the tape came with a free double-sided poster of The Undertaker and Big Boss Man.

It was re-released on DVD in the United Kingdom in October 2004 as part of Silver Vision's Tagged Classics range, and was paired with UK Rampage. This DVD set was not released in the USA.

On 5 February 2018 the event was added to the WWE's streaming platform the WWE Network and remained on the service until the platform closed in 2026. In January 2026, WWE uploaded the event to stream freely on their WWE Vault YouTube channel.

== Results ==
No.	Results	Stipulations	Times
1	The Nasty Boys (Brian Knobbs and Jerry Sags) (with Jimmy Hart) defeated The Rockers (Shawn Michaels and Marty Jannetty)	Tag team match	17:21
2	Ric Flair defeated Tito Santana	Singles match	16:14
3	Earthquake (with Jimmy Hart) defeated Big Boss Man	Singles match	15:47
4	The Mountie (with Jimmy Hart) defeated The Texas Tornado	Singles match	13:46
5	The Undertaker (with Paul Bearer) defeated Jim Duggan by disqualification	Singles match	6:18
6	The Legion of Doom (Hawk and Animal) (c) defeated Power and Glory (Paul Roma and Hercules)	Tag Team match for the WWF Tag Team Championship	9:08
7	The British Bulldog defeated The Barbarian	Singles match	10:07
8	The British Bulldog won by last eliminating Typhoon	20-man battle royal	14:40
(c) / – the champion(s) heading into the match

=== Battle Royal ===
Elimination	Wrestler	Eliminated by	Time
1	Hercules	Hawk	2:26
2	The Texas Tornado	Knobbs & Barbarian	2:41
3	Brian Knobbs	Piper	3:24
4	Marty Jannetty	Typhoon	3:40
5	The Barbarian	Santana	4:16
6	Tito Santana	Earthquake	4:40
7	Road Warrior Hawk	Sags	5:14
8	Jerry Sags	Duggan & Animal	5:19
9	Shawn Michaels	Mountie	5:50
10	Jim Duggan	Earthquake	6:39
11	Earthquake	Animal	7:11
12	Ric Flair	Piper	7:45
13	Paul Roma	Bulldog	8:57
14	Road Warrior Animal	Undertaker	9:06
15	The Undertaker	Piper	9:33
16	Roddy Piper	Undertaker	9:39
17	Big Boss Man	Mountie	11:26
18	The Mountie	Typhoon	13:38
19	Typhoon	Bulldog	14:40
Winner	The British Bulldog	-	N/A

== See also ==
- 1991 in professional wrestling
- Professional wrestling in the United Kingdom
