= Smash (wrestler) =

American professional wrestler (born 1959)

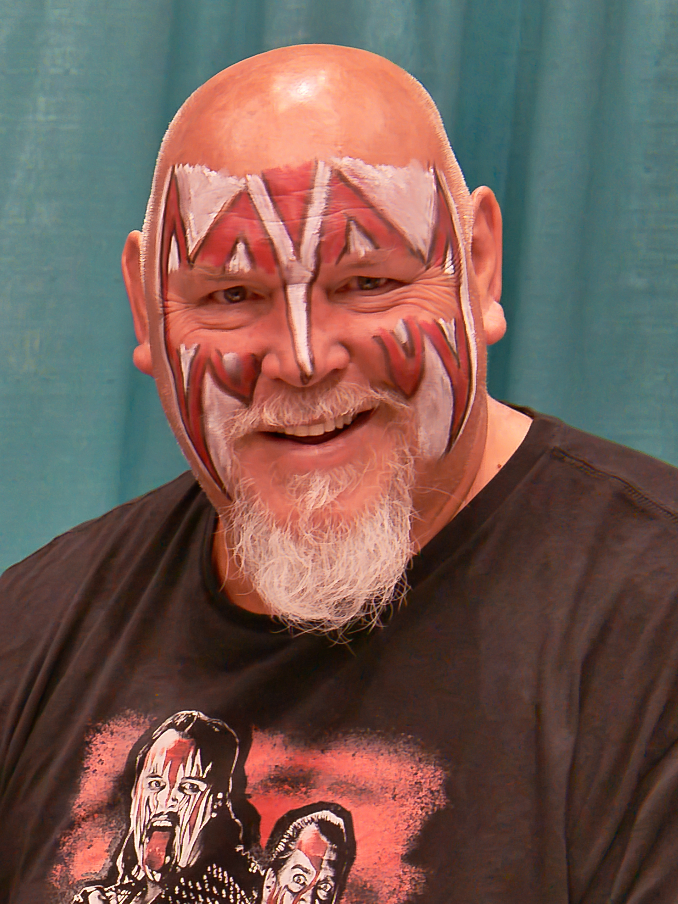
- Darsow in 2024

Personal information
- Born: Barry Allen Darsow; October 6, 1959 (age 67) Minneapolis, Minnesota, U.S.
- Spouse: Theresa Darsow
- Children: Dakota Darsow

Professional wrestling career
- Ring name(s): Barry Darsow; The Blacktop Bully; Crusher Darsow; Krusher Khruschev; Mr. Hole-In-One; Repo Man; Smash; Tsar Mongo; Man Mountain Darsow
- Billed height: 6 ft 2 in (188 cm)
- Billed weight: 290 lb (132 kg)
- Billed from: Parts Unknown (as Smash); The Motor City (as Repo Man); Soviet Union (as Krusher Khruschev)
- Trained by: Eddie Sharkey; Karl Gotch
- Debut: 1983
- Retired: 2017

Barry Allen Darsow (born October 6, 1959) is an American retired professional wrestler who performed as Smash, one half of the tag team Demolition. He also wrestled as Krusher Kruschev, Repo Man, the Blacktop Bully, Man Mountain Darsow and "Mr. Hole in One" Barry Darsow.

Throughout his career, he worked for Jim Crockett Promotions, the World Wrestling Federation (WWF), World Championship Wrestling (WCW), and several regional promotions in the 1980s and 1990s. He is a four-time former world tag team champion, winning three WWF World Tag Team Championships as part of Demolition and one NWA World Tag Team Championship as part of a three-man team with Ivan and Nikita Koloff (although the NWA no longer recognizes any former tag team champions prior to 1992, Darsow's championship is considered part of the WCW World tag team championship lineage), and a one-time NWA United States Tag Team Champion.

In March 2026, The Undertaker announced that Demolition would be inducted into the WWE Hall of Fame Class of 2026, with Ax and Smash as the inducted members.

== Early life ==
Barry Darsow was born on October 6, 1959, in Buffalo, Minnesota. His family then moved to Robbinsdale, Minnesota where he spent his childhood. Darsow attended high school in Robbinsdale, with six other future wrestlers: Curt Hennig, Richard Rood (Rick Rude), Brady Boone, Tom Zenk, John Nord (The Berzerker), and Scott Simpson (Nikita Koloff). He graduated in 1978 during his time there he played on the schools football and ice hockey teams. Following graduation he got into powerlifting and also worked as a bouncer with The Road Warriors, Hawk and Animal.

While working as a bouncer Darsow met wrestling trainer Eddie Sharkey, who then began to train Darsow in the early 1980s.

== Professional wrestling career ==
=== Early career (1983–1984) ===
Darsow made his debut in Hawaii as Tsar Mongo, before a short stint in New Zealand. He returned to Hawaii, before he began wrestling in 1983 in Georgia for Georgia Championship Wrestling where he briefly wrestled under the ring name Man Mountain Darsow. He then moved later that year to Mid-South Wrestling as Crusher Darsow, a turncoat American who was now a Soviet sympathizer and a tag team partner of Nikolai Volkoff. He changed his name to Krusher Khruschev and became the first ever Mid-South Television Title champion in a tournament by beating Terry Taylor in the finals on May 2, 1984, but lost it to Taylor on June 16, 1984. Darsow moved on to Florida Championship Wrestling where he teamed with Jim Neidhart. They won the Florida United States Tag Team Titles on October 11, 1984, from Hector Guerrero and Cocoa Samoa. The team held them until December 1984, when they lost them to Mark and Jay Youngblood.

=== Jim Crockett Promotions (1984–1987) ===
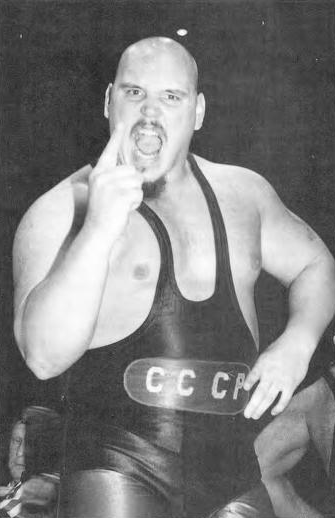
Darsow as Krusher Kruschev

Khruschev moved on to the National Wrestling Alliance to work for Jim Crockett Jr. in December 1984. He was awarded a third of the NWA World Six-Man Tag Team Championship with Ivan and Nikita Koloff after they fell out with their former partner Don Kernodle. The Koloffs had already won the NWA World Tag Team Championship and Ivan declared that any two of them could defend the titles. They feuded with The Rock 'n' Roll Express (Ricky Morton and Robert Gibson) and The Road Warriors. On July 9, 1985, he and Ivan lost the NWA Tag Titles to the Rock 'N Roll Express. The Koloffs subsequently regained and defended the belts without Khruschev's participation. At Starrcade 1985, on November 28, Khruschev won the vacant NWA Mid-Atlantic Heavyweight Championship by defeating Sam Houston. Later on that night, he was in the Koloffs' corner as they lost their Tag titles back to the Express in a cage match with Kernodle in the Express's corner. On January 11, 1986, Khruschev severely injured his knee in a match with Houston on TBS. He lost the title to Houston and had to take almost six months off to recover.

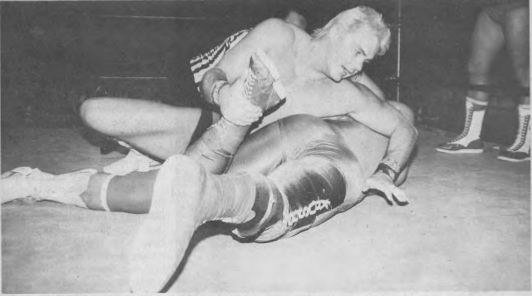
Barry Windham on top of Kruschev during a 1986 match

When Khruschev returned, Nikita was feuding with Magnum T. A. for the NWA United States Heavyweight Championship. On August 17, 1986, Khruschev helped Nikita win the title in the final match of a Best of 7 series by holding the referee while Nikita used his "Russian" chain on Magnum. After helping Nikita defeat Magnum, Khruschev and Ivan targeted the new NWA United States Tag Team Championship, which was to be awarded to the winners of a tournament. They reached the finals, held on September 26, 1986, and defeated the Kansas Jayhawks (Dutch Mantel and Bobby Jaggers) with Nikita's help to become the first US Tag Team Champions. In October 1986, Magnum T. A. had a car accident that ended his career, and after admitting that he respected his one-time rival, Nikita turned his back on Ivan and Khruschev to team with Magnum's good friend, Dusty Rhodes. Kruschev and Ivan briefly feuded with Nikita and Rhodes but primarily defended their titles in rematches against Mantel and Jaggers. On December 9, 1986, they lost the US Tag Titles to Ron Garvin and Barry Windham. Darsow left the NWA after disputing a pay off with Jimmy Crockett.

=== World Wrestling Federation (1987−1993) ===
==== Demolition (1987–1991) ====
Darsow next went to the World Wrestling Federation. He was brought into the company to be part of the tag team Demolition, which had originally consisted of Bill Eadie as Ax and Randy Colley, who had been Moondog Rex of The Moondogs, as Smash. Darsow was tabbed as the new Smash after Colley, who wore face paint like Eadie did as part of his character, was deemed too recognizable even in disguise due to fans chanting "Moondog" at him whenever Demolition wrestled. At first, they were managed by Luscious Johnny V, but he was soon replaced by Mr. Fuji. Their initial feuds involved the team of Ken Patera and Billy Jack Haynes, and Strike Force (Tito Santana and Rick Martel). On March 27, 1988, at WrestleMania IV, they defeated Strike Force to win their first WWF World tag team title, which they held for a record 16 months. During this reign, they fell out with Mr. Fuji as he turned on them to manage their arch-rivals, The Powers of Pain (The Barbarian and The Warlord). This double turn at Survivor Series '88 was the solution to the massive popularity being enjoyed by Demolition. Originally, they were the heels in their rivalry with the Powers of Pain; however, as a result of the incident at the Survivor Series, Demolition became full-fledged babyfaces. Demolition conclusively won the feud with their ex-manager and his new team when they defeated the Powers and Fuji in a five-man handicap tag match at WrestleMania V.

They lost the WWF Tag Team Title to The Brain Busters (Arn Anderson and Tully Blanchard) on the July 29, 1989 Saturday Night's Main Event XXII. They regained the title on October 2, but lost them to The Colossal Connection (Haku and André the Giant) on December 13. They defeated the Connection at WrestleMania VI on April 1, 1990, to become the third ever team to win the titles a third time in WWF history. The duo was joined by Crush (Brian Adams) later in 1990, making them a 3-man tag team and the second team Darsow had been involved in whose title reign operated under the Freebird Rule. Ax began appearing in a managerial role which was to eventually lead to the phasing out of the character. Demolition lost the titles to The Hart Foundation at SummerSlam '90. After a feud with Legion of Doom, the team dropped down the card and would disband in the spring of 1991, with Crush leaving the WWF for a year and Smash wrestling as a singles wrestler, primarily in house show undercards, where he was used to elevate other stars, such as Kerry Von Erich, Greg Valentine and Ricky Steamboat. His only victories during this run came over Jim Powers and Shane Douglas. He also appeared under a mask as an unnamed man hired by Ted DiBiase to wrestle Virgil on the August 18, 1991 SummerSlam Spectacular special. His final recorded WWF match as Smash would occur on August 24, 1991, getting pinned by The British Bulldog.

==== Repo Man (1991–1993) ====
While still wrestling as Demolition Smash, Darsow made his initial appearance as Repo Man on July 30, 1991, in Portland, Maine, wrestling in a dark match at a Wrestling Challenge taping. Four days before his final match as Smash, he made a second appearance in a dark match at another Challenge Taping in Erie, PA and defeated Phil Apollo on August 20. Following the August 24 house show defeat to Davey Boy Smith, Darsow retired the Demolition gimmick and was off the road for three months. On the November 9 edition of Prime Time Wrestling a vignette aired that introduced his new Repo Man character. The repackaging was of a character who was a ubiquitous, sneaky heel character who delighted in repossessing items such as cars from people when they were late on (or unable to make) their payments. As Repo Man, Darsow wore a black domino mask (similar to The Lone Ranger and Zorro) and an outfit decorated with tire tracks, and had mannerisms similar to Frank Gorshin's portrayal of The Riddler. He always carried a tow rope that he would tie up opponents with after defeating them and then assault them after. The character was actually the idea of Darsow himself, who previously had a job repossessing cars. Shortly after his debut, he was hired by Ted DiBiase to help him defeat Virgil for the Million Dollar Championship, leading to a series of matches with Virgil. At the This Tuesday in Texas pay-per-view, Repo Man and DiBiase defeated Virgil and Tito Santana. Repo Man made a memorable appearance at the 1992 Royal Rumble, sneaking to the ring and eliminating Nikolai Volkoff and Greg "The Hammer" Valentine before eventually being eliminated by The Big Boss Man. He also appeared at WrestleMania VIII, teaming with The Mountie and The Nasty Boys to be defeated by The Big Boss Man, Virgil, "Hacksaw" Jim Duggan and Sgt. Slaughter.

Repo Man's most notable feud was with The British Bulldog in mid-1992, sparked by Repo Man hanging the Bulldog over the ring ropes with his tow rope on the May 3, 1992, episode of Wrestling Challenge. The two had a series of house show matches as well as a match on Prime Time Wrestling, all of which saw Bulldog come out victorious. Repo Man lost a match to former partner Crush at SummerSlam, though it was never acknowledged on television that Repo Man was actually Smash. He also worked against Jim Duggan on house shows during this period. Repo Man also had a short feud with Randy Savage in January 1993 when he repossessed Savage's hat on an episode of Monday Night Raw. The two had a match the following week, which Savage won. Repo Man made his final PPV appearance at the 1993 Royal Rumble, where he was eliminated by Savage. Originally, Darsow had planned that after a run as a villain, Repo Man would become a heroic character. However, the turn never happened. Repo Man would return for one-off appearances in 2001 for the gimmick battle royal at Wrestlemania X-Seven, and in 2007 for a battle royal at the 15th-anniversary WWE Raw special, Raw XV.

=== Independent Association of Wrestling (1993) ===
In 1993, Darsow joined the IAW promotion where he teamed with Paul Roma to win the IAW Tag Team titles on February 4, 1993 (while he was still on the WWF roster). They held them until July 24, when they lost them to The Iron Sheik and Brian Costello.

=== World Championship Wrestling (1994–1995) ===
In 1994, Darsow signed with WCW. He first wrestled under his real name in January. By August, he began appearing in the front of events with a blow horn, making noise and berating the faces while they wrestled, and would sometimes be kicked out of arenas by security. On the November 26 edition of WCW Saturday Night, he was eventually kayfabe arrested for pushing Dustin Rhodes. Col. Rob Parker bailed Darsow out from jail, after which point Darsow became known as The Blacktop Bully, with Parker as his manager. He feuded with Rhodes, but both were fired after Uncensored 1995, when he and Rhodes both bladed (which was against WCW's 'no-blood' policy) during a "King of the Road" match in the back of a moving flatbed truck, which Darsow won.

=== Independent circuit (1995–1997) ===
From there, he went to Pro Wrestling America in Minnesota to feud with Wahoo McDaniel and Tom Zenk. He next appeared in the American Wrestling Federation, with Jimmy Valiant's wife Big Mama as his valet. The AWF folded at the beginning of 1997.

=== Return to WCW (1997–1999) ===
Darsow returned to WCW under his real name on October 6, 1997, teaming with John Nord to defeat Mike Enos and Wayne Bloom in a dark match prior to WCW Monday Nitro. For the following year, he appeared in the undercard as a heel, mostly on WCW's tertiary and quaternary shows WCW Saturday Night and WCW Worldwide. He also notably lost to Goldberg on the March 9, 1998, edition of Nitro and the April 16, 1998, edition of WCW Thunder.

On the October 17, 1998, edition of Saturday Night, Darsow was repackaged as "Mr. Hole-In-One", Barry Darsow, a villainous golf player. He often entered the ring in casual wear and a flat cap as if ready to golf and, prior to matches, would offer his opponents a victory if they could make a putt in the ring, often only to sneak attack the opponent. Darsow feuded with "Hacksaw" Jim Duggan and Chris Adams during this time, typically on Saturday Night.

On the April 24, 1999, edition of Worldwide, Darsow dropped the golfer gimmick, returning to his given name and wearing a black singlet. On August 28, 1999, Darsow teamed with Bobby Eaton in a loss to Harlem Heat on Saturday Night. After Booker T pinned Darsow, Harlem Heat hit Darsow in the head with their WCW World Tag Team Championships. Due to the blow to the head, in the following weeks, Darsow took on an amnesia gimmick, wherein he would reprise a different one of his past JCP/WCW gimmicks every week (the Smash and Repo Man gimmicks were WWE trademarks). On the September 18, 1999, edition of Worldwide, Darsow reprised his Krusher Kruschev gimmick, and then returned to "Mr. Hole-In-One" on the September 18, 1999, edition of Saturday Night. On October 2, 1999, he returned to his Blacktop Bully gimmick, which he used for the remainder of his time in WCW. His final match was a loss against Steven Regal on the December 18, 1999, edition of Worldwide.

=== Later career (2000–2001, 2007–2017) ===
Darsow as Demolition Smash at a Jersey All Pro Wrestling show in 2009.

Darsow joined the WXO promotion run by Ted DiBiase. He feuded with Mike Enos until it folded shortly after in 2001. That same year, Darsow made a special WWF appearance at WrestleMania X-Seven for the gimmick battle royal as Repo Man. After his Wrestlemania appearance Darsow retired from wrestling.

The Millennium Wrestling Federation (MWF) helped reunite Darsow with his partner Ax as Demolition and the two appeared at the Wrestling Living Legends reunion in Windsor, Ontario, Canada in March 2007. On the March 2008 MWF Ultra television program, Darsow, as Demolition Smash teamed with former WCW wrestler Rick Fuller to defeat Ox Baker's Army in a tag team casket match. On Raw XV, on the 15th-anniversary WWE Raw special on December 10, 2007, Darsow participated in the 15th Anniversary Battle Royal under his Repo Man persona.

Alongside Ax and One Man Gang, he competed in the Chikara King of the Trios Tournament in 2008, but were eliminated in the second round by "The Fabulous Three" (Larry Sweeney, Mitch Ryder and Shayne Hawke). On October 28, 2009, Smash appeared, with his partner Ax, at the Keystone State Wrestling Alliance. Where they defeated Tag Team Champions Shawn Blanchard and Lou Martin for the KSWA Tag Team Championship, which they would hold for that match only before relinquishing them due to not being able to return for further shows. Darsow still competes on the independent circuit to this day with Ax. They are currently the GLCW and USXW Tag Team Champions. On March 12, 2011, Darsow made his Dynamic Wrestling Alliance debut at Dynamic Destiny 2011 teaming with Ax as they took on another former WWF World Tag Team combination, The Dream Team (Greg "The Hammer" Valentine and Brutus "The Barber" Beefcake).

On May 21, 2011, Demolition reunited at Full Impact Pro's debut iPPV In Full Force. Their match against Tony DeVito and Ralph Mosco went to a no contest when local commentator and manager Larry Dallas came out and said his men wanted revenge. The ring was stormed by Manu, Sami Callihan, Blain Rage and Joey Attel. Demolition, Devito and Mosco managed to clear the ring and beat Dallas to end the show. Demolition returned to Chikara on September 16, 2012, taking part in a tag team gauntlet match, from which they eliminated The Devastation Corporation (Blaster McMassive and Max Smashmaster), before being eliminated themselves by their old WWF rivals, the Powers of Pain.

He retired from wrestling in 2017 after Ax retired.

On March 2, 2026, The Undertaker announced that the third inductees of the WWE Hall of Fame Class of 2026 are Ax and Smash of Demolition.

== Outside wrestling and in popular culture ==
Darsow balances his time between wrestling, his two businesses, his family, and the golf course. Darsow owns Added Value Printing, a printing company that specializes in hard-hats and medical supplies, and also sells real estate. In December 2008, Darsow's son, Dakota, signed a developmental contract with WWE. Darsow has worked with the Millennium Wrestling Federation (MWF)'s efforts with the Special Olympics. Darsow is good friends with Arn Anderson, Barry Horowitz, Bill Irwin, and Brad Rheingans. He was also good friends with Curt Hennig, Rick Rude (both of whom he attended high school with), Brady Boone, Dino Bravo, and Brian Adams. Japanese band Aural Vampire produced a song called "The Repoman" and use video footage of Darsow and other wrestlers in live performances. Former Ring of Honor performer Adam Pearce is often heckled by fans who call him "Repo Man" because he looks similar to Darsow. At one match in 2007, at the pay-per-view taping for Driven, against Takeshi Morishima, Pearce pulled a mask similar to the Repo Man's out of his tights and put it on to the delight of the crowd.

Smash made his video game debut in the 1991 game WWF WrestleFest, he also appeared in WWE 12. He was also added as downloadable content for WWE 2k26.

== Personal life ==
Darsow is married to his wife. Together they have one son named Dakota. He has 3 grandchildren.

In July 2016, Darsow was named part of a class action lawsuit filed against WWE which alleged that wrestlers incurred traumatic brain injuries during their tenure and that the company concealed the risks of injury. The suit is litigated by attorney Konstantine Kyros, who has been involved in some number of other lawsuits against WWE. The lawsuit was dismissed by US District Judge Vanessa Lynne Bryant in September 2018. In September 2020, an appeal for the lawsuit was dismissed by a federal appeals court.

Darsow released his own autobiography, Sickles, Studs & Stolen Cars: The Many Faces of Barry Darsow, on October 10, 2025.

== Championships and accomplishments ==
- All Star Pro Wrestling -
  - British Empire/Commonwealth Heavyweight Championship (New Zealand Version) (1 time)
- 50th State Big Time Wrestling -
  - NWA World Tag Team Championship (Hawaiian Version) (1 time) - with Gor Mongol
- Cauliflower Alley Club
  - Tag Team Award (2015) – with Ax
- Championship Wrestling from Florida
  - NWA United States Tag Team Championship (Florida version) (1 time) – with Jim Neidhart
- Great Lakes Championship Wrestling
  - GLCW Tag Team Championship (1 time) – with Ax
- Independent Association of Wrestling
  - IAW Tag Team Championship (1 time) – with Paul Roma
- Jim Crockett Promotions
  - NWA Mid-Atlantic Heavyweight Championship (1 time)
  - NWA United States Tag Team Championship (1 time) – with Ivan Koloff
  - NWA World Six-Man Tag Team Championship (2 time) – with Ivan and Nikita Koloff
  - NWA World Tag Team Championship (Mid-Atlantic version) (1 time) – with Ivan Koloff and Nikita Koloff
- Keystone State Wrestling Alliance
  - KSWA Tag Team Championship (1 time) – with Ax
- Mid-South Wrestling Association
  - Mid-South Television Championship (1 time)
- New England Pro Wrestling Hall of Fame
  - Class of 2020 – with Ax
- United States Xtreme Wrestling
  - USXW Tag Team Championship (1 time) – with Ax
- World Wrestling Federation/WWE
  - WWF Tag Team Championship (3 times) – with Ax
  - WWE Hall of Fame (Class of 2026) – with Ax
^{1} The Koloffs won the tag team titles and then brought Darsow (as Krusher Khruschev) in and, using the "Freebird Rule", defended the titles in various combinations.
^{2} In Demolition's third reign as WWF Tag Team Champions, Ax and Smash were joined by Crush, forming a three-man team and defending the titles under the Freebird Rule
