= Mr. Fuji =

American professional wrestler and manager (1934–2016)

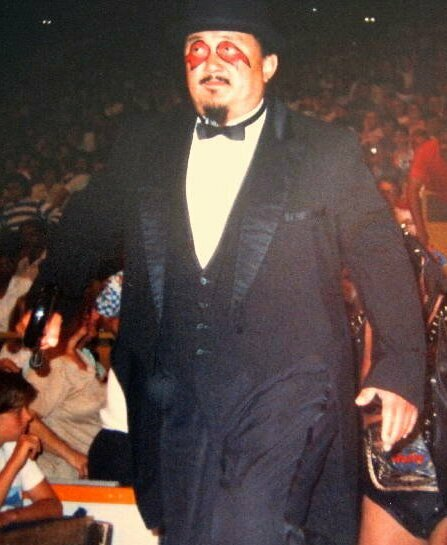
- Mr. Fuji as the manager of Demolition, wearing their signature face paint

Personal information
- Born: Harry Masayoshi Fujiwara; May 4, 1934 Honolulu, Territory of Hawaii
- Died: August 28, 2016 (aged 82) Clarksville, Tennessee, U.S.

Professional wrestling career
- Ring name(s): Mr. Fujiwara; Shintaro Fuji; Mr. Fuji
- Billed height: 5 ft 10 in (178 cm)
- Billed weight: 270 lb (122 kg)
- Billed from: Osaka, Japan
- Debut: 1962
- Retired: 1992

Harry Masayoshi Fujiwara (Japanese: 藤原 正義, Hepburn: Fujiwara Masayoshi; 4 May 1934 – 28 August 2016) was an American professional wrestler, actor and manager, known professionally by his ring name Mr. Fuji (or Master Fuji to his protégés). He was famous for often throwing salt in the eyes of fan favorite wrestlers. Notable wrestlers and tag teams managed by him include Don Muraco, Yokozuna and Demolition.

== Early life ==
Harry Masayoshi Fujiwara was born on May 4, 1934, in Honolulu, Hawaii. He was of Japanese and Native Hawaiian ancestry.

== Professional wrestling career ==
=== Early career (1962–1972) ===
Fujiwara made his professional wrestling debut in 1962 in his native Hawaii under the ring name Mr. Fujiwara. He won his first championship, the NWA Hawaii Tag Team Championship, with King Curtis Iaukea on January 7, 1966. He shortened his ring name to Mr. Fuji and toured many territories, including Don Owen's Portland, Oregon based NWA Pacific Northwest Wrestling where he won many championships.

=== World Wide Wrestling Federation (1972–1974) ===
Fuji debuted in Vince McMahon Sr.'s World Wide Wrestling Federation in 1972 as a heel. He formed a tag team with Professor Toru Tanaka and the duo were managed by the Grand Wizard. Tanaka provided his physical massive strength and Fuji brought his devious ring psychology to the team, which earned him the nickname "The Devious One". Fuji used to throw salt in his opponent's eyes, which earned him victories. They defeated Sonny King and Chief Jay Strongbow on June 27, 1972, for their first World Tag Team Championship. They quickly ascended to main event status, defending the titles against WWWF World Heavyweight Champion Pedro Morales and Bruno Sammartino on several occasions, throughout the year. During the feud, Fuji earned a shot at the WWWF title against Morales on August 22 but lost by count-out. They reigned for eleven months, making them the third longest reigning WWWF World Tag Team Champions in history. They lost the championship to Tony Garea and Haystacks Calhoun on May 30, 1973.

They continued to feud with Garea and Calhoun for the titles before defeating them on September 11 in a rematch to win their second WWWF World Tag Team Championship. With their title recapture, their feud with Garea and his new partner Dean Ho continued. On November 14, Fuji and Tanaka lost the titles to Garea and Ho. After failing to recapture the title from Garea and Ho, Fuji and Tanaka left the WWWF in 1974.

=== Mid-Atlantic and Georgia Championship Wrestling (1974–1975) ===
After WWWF, Fuji went on his own to Mid-Atlantic Championship Wrestling from 1974 to 1975.

He reunited with Tanaka and debuted in Georgia Championship Wrestling (GCW) in August 1975. On September 19, 1975, they participated in a four-team tournament where they defeated former WWWF rivals Tony Garea and Dean Ho in the finals to win the vacant NWA Georgia Tag Team Championship. They lost the title to Bob Backlund and Jerry Brisco a month later. Shortly after their title loss, they left GCW and toured other territories and won several titles.

=== California and Texas (1976–1977) ===
In 1976, Fuji went on his own to work for Big Time Wrestling in California. He won the NWA San Francisco United States title defeating Pat Patterson on February 7 in San Francisco. He held the title until leaving the territory in February 1977.

Also in 1976 he worked for World Class Championship Wrestling in Texas while champion in California.

=== Return to the WWWF (1977–1978) ===
Fuji and Tanaka returned to WWWF in 1977. They took on Freddie Blassie as their manager. On September 27, 1977, they defeated Larry Zbyszko and longtime rival Tony Garea in the finals of a tag team tournament to win their third WWWF World Tag Team Championship. They wrestled in many six-man and eight-man tag team matches during their third reign. They lost the belts to Dino Bravo and Dominic DeNucci on the March 14, 1978, episode of Championship Wrestling. Shortly after, they left WWWF again.

=== Touring the territories (1978–1981) ===
Fuji and Tanaka continued to tour the territories in 1979 where they won titles again. Later that same year, they stopped teaming and began wrestling individually. Fuji had success, winning several singles titles in many promotions including World Wrestling Council, NWA New Zealand and Maple Leaf Wrestling.

=== Second return to the WWF (1981–1996) ===
==== Teaming with Mr. Saito (1981–1982) ====
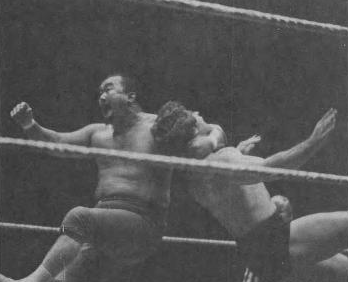
Fuji (left) clotheslines Tony Garea (right), c. 1981

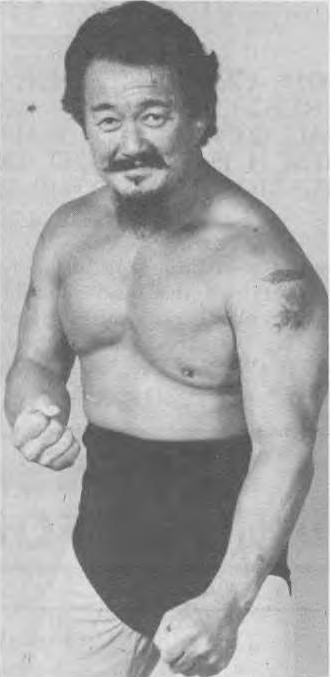
Fujiwara, c. 1983

Fuji returned to World Wide Wrestling Federation, then known as the World Wrestling Federation, in 1981. He formed a tag team with Mr. Saito, which was managed by Captain Lou Albano. They began a feud with tag champions Tony Garea and Rick Martel, whom they defeated on the October 17, 1981, episode of Championship Wrestling to win their first Tag Team Championship, though it was Fuji's fourth individual reign. They began feuding with The Strongbows (Chief Jay and Jules) in the fall of 1981. This culminated in a title match on June 28, 1982, at Madison Square Garden (MSG) where the Strongbows won the championship. On the July 13 episode of Championship Wrestling, they defeated the Strongbows in a two out of three falls match for Fuji's fifth and Saito's second WWF Tag Team Championship. The feud of these two teams ended after Fuji and Saito lost the titles to the Strongbows on the October 30 episode of Championship Wrestling.

==== Singles competition and Tiger Chung Lee feud (1982–1985) ====
Fuji was mainly used in singles competition and teamed on and off with Tiger Chung Lee, but they had little success in the ring. In a brief angle, Fuji turned on Chung Lee in a match at the Philadelphia Spectrum against The Wild Samoans in 1984. In a grudge match to settle the feud, Fuji defeated Chung Lee. Afterward, Fuji continued to wrestle on his own until his in-ring retirement and Chung Lee stayed with the WWF until 1988 in the lower mid-card to preliminary wrestler.

==== Managerial career (1985–1996) ====
Fuji retired from wrestling in 1985 and became a heel manager and wrestled occasionally. As a manager, Fuji often "blinded" his opponents by throwing salt in their eyes, or he or his wrestler(s) hit their opponent with his ever-present cane. He wore a black tuxedo and bowler hat, akin to the James Bond series character Oddjob, and carried a little bag of salt. His first client was George Steele. Fuji teamed with him to lose to Hulk Hogan and "Mean" Gene Okerlund when Okerlund pinned Fuji. Steele soon became a face and left Fuji. Fuji's next client was Don Muraco. They formed a popular heel duo and appeared in a number of TV show parodies, including "Fuji Vice", which was a send-up of Miami Vice. Fuji and Muraco then began a feud with Ricky Steamboat, resulting in Steamboat defeating Fuji in several matches during the feud. Fuji briefly managed Jim Neidhart, whose contract he later sold to Jimmy Hart. In 1987, he bought the contract of Demolition (Ax and Smash) from Luscious Johnny V. Demolition started calling him "Master Fuji" and also Fuji began sporting face paint after becoming their manager. He brought Killer Khan and Sika back to the WWF. He acquired Kamala from The Wizard, managing him in singles or tag matches with Sika, while also leading "Cowboy" Bob Orton (who often teamed with Muraco).

Fuji managed Demolition to the Tag Team Championship at Wrestlemania IV. At Survivor Series '88, he turned on Demolition and began managing Demolition's rival tag team, The Powers of Pain (Warlord and Barbarian). Interviewed after the contest, Fuji claimed that he had turned on Demolition because, since winning the championship, they had become insubordinate and disrespectful to him, whereas the Powers would be utterly obedient and loyal apprentices. For their part, Demolition denounced their former manager as a parasite, labelling him "Fuj the Stooge".

At WrestleMania V, Fuji teamed with the Powers of Pain in a 3-on-2 handicap match against Demolition for their Tag Team Championship. Fuji and Powers were defeated after Ax pinned Fuji following a Demolition Decapitation. Fuji sold the individual contracts of Powers of Pain to managers Slick and Bobby "the Brain" Heenan and brought The Orient Express (Pat Tanaka and Akio Sato) to the WWF and also stopped using face paint. The Orient Express got involved in a feud with The Rockers (Shawn Michaels and Marty Jannetty), whom The Orient Express defeated by count out (thanks to Sato throwing the salt in Janetty's eyes) at Wrestlemania VI. Orient Express got involved in Demolition's feud with the Legion of Doom (Hawk and Animal). Fuji reunited with Demolition (who by this time had a third member, Crush) at that point. Demolition was phased out while the Orient Express took on Legion of Doom in matches. Fuji then managed The Berzerker in late 1991 until early 1993. His last match in WWF was teaming with Kamala as they lost to The Undertaker in a handicap match on July 26, 1992, at a house show.

Fuji's greatest success and popularity as a manager came in November 1992 when he introduced the mammoth Yokozuna to the WWF. Under Fuji's tutelage, Yokozuna won the 1993 Royal Rumble match and two WWF World Championships, first from Bret Hart at WrestleMania IX, and again from Hulk Hogan at King of the Ring. Later that year, Fuji was joined by "spokesman" James E. Cornette. In late 1993, Fuji once again began managing Crush after he turned on Randy Savage. During this time he again changed his appearance, shaving his head and abandoning the tuxedo and bowler hat in favor of a traditional Japanese kimono and carrying the Japanese flag.

In 1995, when Yokozuna returned to the WWF following Survivor Series at WrestleMania XI, Fuji was brought back as his manager along with Cornette and Yoko began teaming with Owen Hart in which they won the WWF Tag Team Championship. Around this time, Fuji was slowly being phased into the background (in reality his legs were starting to bother him and he wasn't able to get into the ring) and by early 1996 after Yokozuna turned babyface, Fuji only made two more appearances as a babyface manager and carrying the American flag and Fuji was not in the best of health and was released from the WWF in May 1996.

== Retirement ==
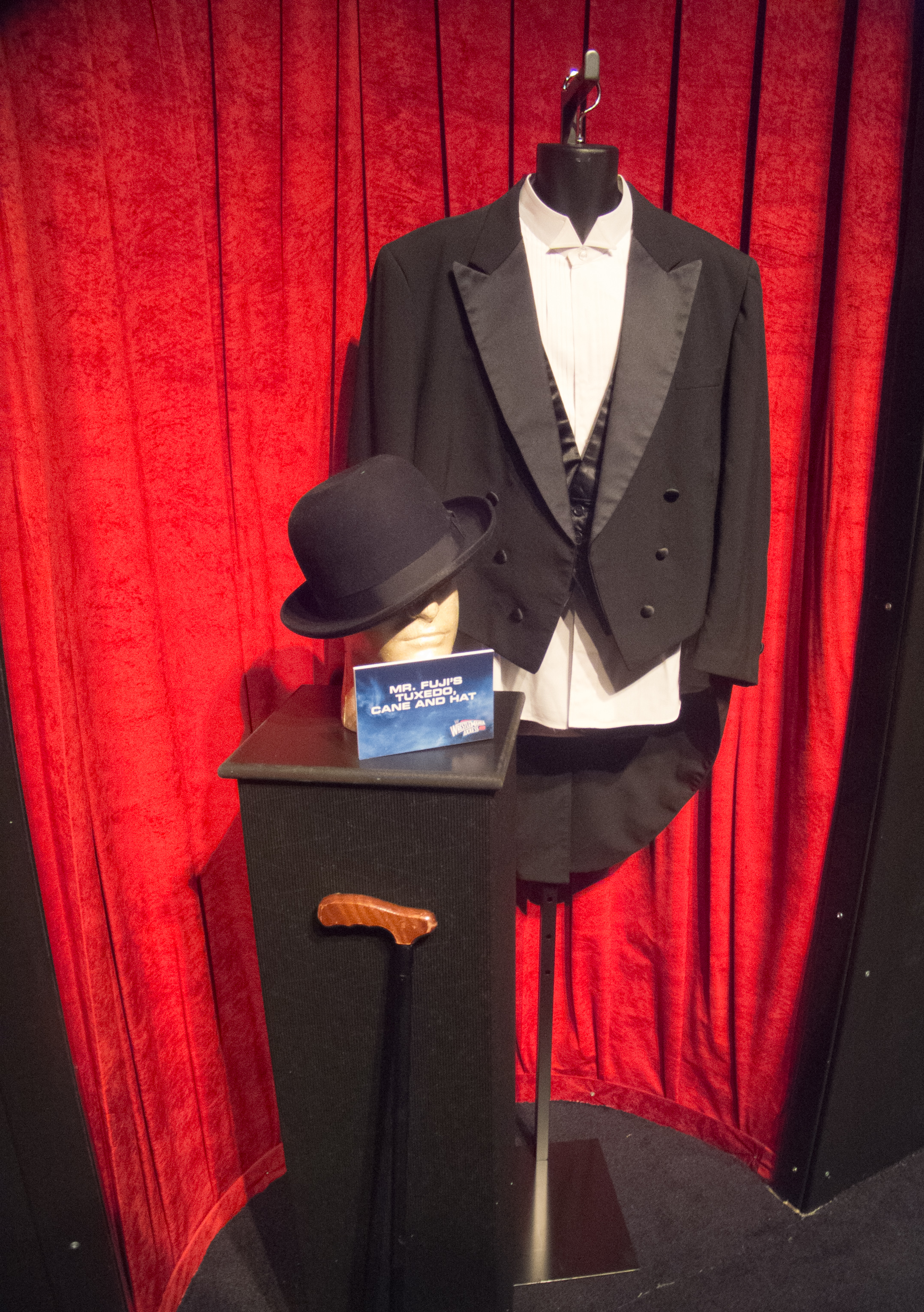
Mr. Fuji's attire at WrestleMania Axxess

After leaving wrestling, Fujiwara retired to the city of Knoxville, Tennessee. In 1997, he successfully sued the makers of the video game WCW vs. nWo World Tour, claiming that the character "Master Fuji" was based on him.

Fujiwara operated a training dojo out of Jefferson City, Tennessee, and Dandridge, Tennessee, until 2001. He was a part-time usher at Knoxville Center's (formerly East Town Mall) movie theater.

Fujiwara was inducted into the WWE Hall of Fame on March 31, 2007, by his former charge and Fuji Vice co-star Don Muraco. Fujiwara was in a wheelchair at the time of the induction due to nine knee operations.

== Death ==
Fujiwara died of natural causes, aged 82, on August 28, 2016, in Clarksville, Tennessee. He was survived by his seven children — Tyran Wong, Teri Deptula, Tami Nelson, Kimberly Brewster, Toni Fujiwara, Kelli Fujiwara Sloan and Kevin Fujiwara — as well as 13 grandchildren and 12 great-grandchildren.

A postmortem brain scan revealed Fujiwara was diagnosed with chronic traumatic encephalopathy, which became an issue in professional wrestling in a postmortem examination of Chris Benoit's brain after his death. In the wake of the billion dollar settlement between the NFL and former players over CTE issues, daughter Kelli Fujiwara Sloan, representing the estate, participated in a class action lawsuit against WWE in which it was claimed the promotion did not protect its employees from head trauma. Sloan's group was represented by attorney Konstantine Kyros in the litigation. In September 2018, US District Judge Vanessa Lynne Bryant dismissed the lawsuit.

== Championships and accomplishments ==
- Continental Wrestling Association
  - AWA Southern Tag Team Championship (1 time) – with Toru Tanaka
- Georgia Championship Wrestling
  - NWA Georgia Tag Team Championship (1 time) – with Toru Tanaka
- Maple Leaf Wrestling
  - NWA Canadian Heavyweight Championship (Toronto version) (1 time)
- Mid-Atlantic Championship Wrestling
  - NWA Mid-Atlantic Tag Team Championship (1 time) – with Genichiro Tenryu
- New England Pro Wrestling Hall of Fame
  - Class of 2013
- NWA Mid-Pacific Promotions
  - NWA Hawaii Tag Team Championship (2 times) – with Curtis Iaukea (1) and Karl Von Steiger (1)
- NWA New Zealand
  - NWA British Commonwealth Heavyweight Championship (New Zealand version) (1 time)
- NWA San Francisco
  - NWA United States Heavyweight Championship (San Francisco version) (1 time)
- Pacific Northwest Wrestling
  - NWA Pacific Northwest Heavyweight Championship (1 time)
  - NWA Pacific Northwest Tag Team Championship (4 times) – with Haru Sasaki (3) and Tony Borne (1)
- Pro Wrestling Illustrated
  - Ranked No. 445 of the 500 best singles wrestlers during the "PWI Years" in 2003
- Southeastern Championship Wrestling
  - NWA Southeastern Tag Team Championship (1 time) – with Toru Tanaka
- World Championship Wrestling
  - IWA World Tag Team Championship (1 time) – with Tiger Jeet Singh
- World Wide Wrestling Federation / World Wrestling Federation / Entertainment
  - WWWF/WWF Tag Team Championship (5 times) – with Toru Tanaka (3) and Mr. Saito (2)
  - WWE Hall of Fame (Class of 2007)
- World Wrestling Council
  - WWC North American Heavyweight Championship (1 time)
  - WWC North American Tag Team Championship (1 time) – with Pierre Martel
- Wrestling Observer Newsletter
  - Worst On Interviews (1993)
  - Worst Manager of the Year (1984–1985, 1987–1995)
