= José Estrada Sr. =

Puerto Rican professional wrestler (born 1946)

Personal information
- Born: José Estrada; 1946 (age 79–80) Santurce, Puerto Rico
- Children: 4; including Rico Suave and José Estrada Jr.

Professional wrestling career
- Ring name(s): José Estrada; Super Medic I Super Medico I Barrabás #2; Conquistador Dos; Carlos Estrada; Carlos José Estrada; El Super Medico; Solid Gold 24k White Angel
- Billed height: 1.70 m (5 ft 7 in)
- Billed weight: 98 kg (216 lb)
- Billed from: Puerto Rico "Somewhere in Latin America"
- Debut: 1975
- Retired: 1993, 2005
- Military service
- Branch: United States Army
- Conflicts: Vietnam War

José Estrada Sr. (born 1946) is a Puerto Rican retired professional wrestler who was a longtime mainstay of the World Wrestling Council as well as having stints in North American promotions, most notably two separate periods of time for the World Wide Wrestling Federation / World Wrestling Federation (WWWF/WWF). First from 1976 until 1983, holding the now inactive Junior Heavyweight Championship under his real name. From 1987 until 1990 he worked as Conquistador Dos, working as part of a masked team known as Los Conquistadores. He has also worked extensively in his native Puerto Rico, primarily for the World Wrestling Council (WWC) where he played the masked "Super Medico I", where he teamed both with a masked Don Kent in 1984 and his son José Estrada Jr. in 1990. He worked briefly in an early IWA as commissioner of the company then with the WWC in 2007 as a wrestling manager. His son is also a retired professional wrestler, who worked primarily in Puerto Rico.

== Professional wrestling career ==
=== WWWF, Japan and Early career (1975–1983) ===
Migrated to New York in 1959. Served a tour of duty with the United States Army in the Vietnam War. Estrada made his professional wrestling debut in 1975 in his native Puerto Rico working for the local World Wrestling Council (WWC) promotion. In WWC he was given the masked ring character Super Médico I ("Super Medic 1"), teaming with Super Médico II to form Los Super Médicos, sometimes also referred to simply as Los Médicos, often wrestling clad in all white. On December 25, 1976, the team defeated Hercules Ayala and Victor Jovica to win the WWC North American Tag Team Championship. Los Super Médicos held the titles until March 4, 1977, where they were defeated by the team of Danny and Michel Martel. By 1978, Estrada found himself working for the New York-based World Wide Wrestling Federation (WWWF) Carlos José Estrada, sometimes billed simply as Carlos Estrada or José Estrada. On January 20, 1978, Estrada defeated Tony Garea in a tournament final to win the WWWF Junior Heavyweight Championship, a championship that had been inactive for at least six years prior to the tournament. Three days later Estrada dropped the championship to Tatsumi Fujinami who would then bring the championship with him to Japan. In 1981 he returned to Puerto Rico as Super Médico I, teaming with Super Médico II to win the North American Tag Team Championship from Los Pastores ("The Sheepherders"; Luke Williams and Butch Miller) in April, only to lose them back to Los Pastores in May after a brief, but bloody storyline feud between the two teams. In 1982, he wrestled as The White Angel in the WWF. He would continue to work for the WWWF, now simply the WWF after his brief return to Puerto Rico and also worked for the Japanese New Japan Pro-Wrestling (NJPW) promotion through the WWF's tours of Japan.

=== World Wrestling Council (1983–1986) ===
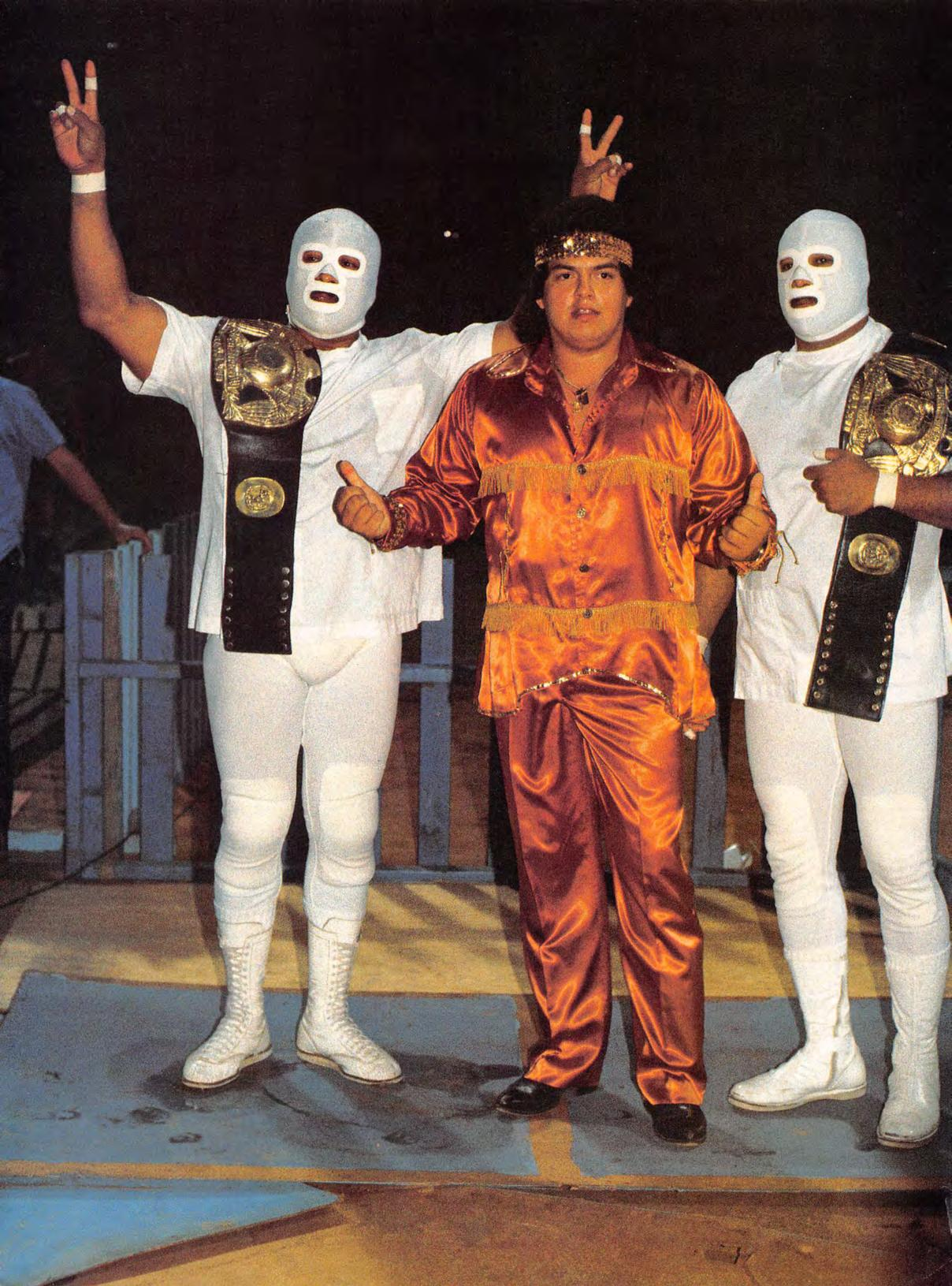
The Super Medics and their manager Hugo Savinovich (center) as WWC North American Tag Team Champions

In 1983, he returned to Puerto Rico once more and with his Super Médicos partner won the WWC North American Tag Team Championship for the third time on July 10, 1983, when they defeated King Tonga and El Gran Apolo, holding the titles for three months before Tonga and Apolo regained the belts. He would work for the WWF again in 1984 before returning full-time to Puerto Rico. Back in Puerto Rico Los Super Médicos moved up in the tag team ranks as they won their first ever WWC World Tag Team Championship on September 10, 1983, defeating the team of Carlos Colón and Pedro Morales. Between December, 1983 and January, 1984, the "Super Medicos" had a feud for the World Tag Team titles against Hercules Ayala and King Tonga, which began on a televised match in late December 1983 when Ayala and Tonga unmasked one of the "Super Medicos" (probably #2). The feud continued on January 6, 1984, on another match during which Ayala and Tonga unmasked Super Medico #2 (his manager, Barrabas, covered his face with his jacket). On January 13, 1984, the two teams had a match in Ponce in which Ayala and Tonga managed to unmask both Super Medics (they left the ring areas with towels around their faces so the fans never saw them). Finally on January 20, the team of Hercules Ayala and King Tonga defeated Los Super Médicos for the titles in a cage match in Ponce, only to drop them to Los Super Médicos 22 days later. Their second run as the WWC World Tag Team Champions came to an end on April 25, 1984, at the hands of The Invaders (Invader I and Invader III) In August Los Super Médicos won the World tag team championship again, but in October the team was stripped of the titles as Super Médico II was unmasked and was played by Don Kent, not the man that actually won the title with Estrada. Following the revelation that Kent had replaced Johnny Rodz and Kent left the area, leaving Estrada as Super Médico I on his own. Super Médico I and Black Gordman won the WWC World Tag Team Championship briefly in December 1984. After the brief tag team run Estrada, still as Super Médico I turned face and won the WWC Puerto Rico Heavyweight Championship on February 10, 1985, beating former partner Black Gordman. His first reign ended on June 8, 1985, when he lost it to Fidel Sierra, but regained it a month later. Eric Embry ended Estrada's second run, swapping the title back and forth in May of the following year as well.

=== Los Conquistadores (1987–1990) ===
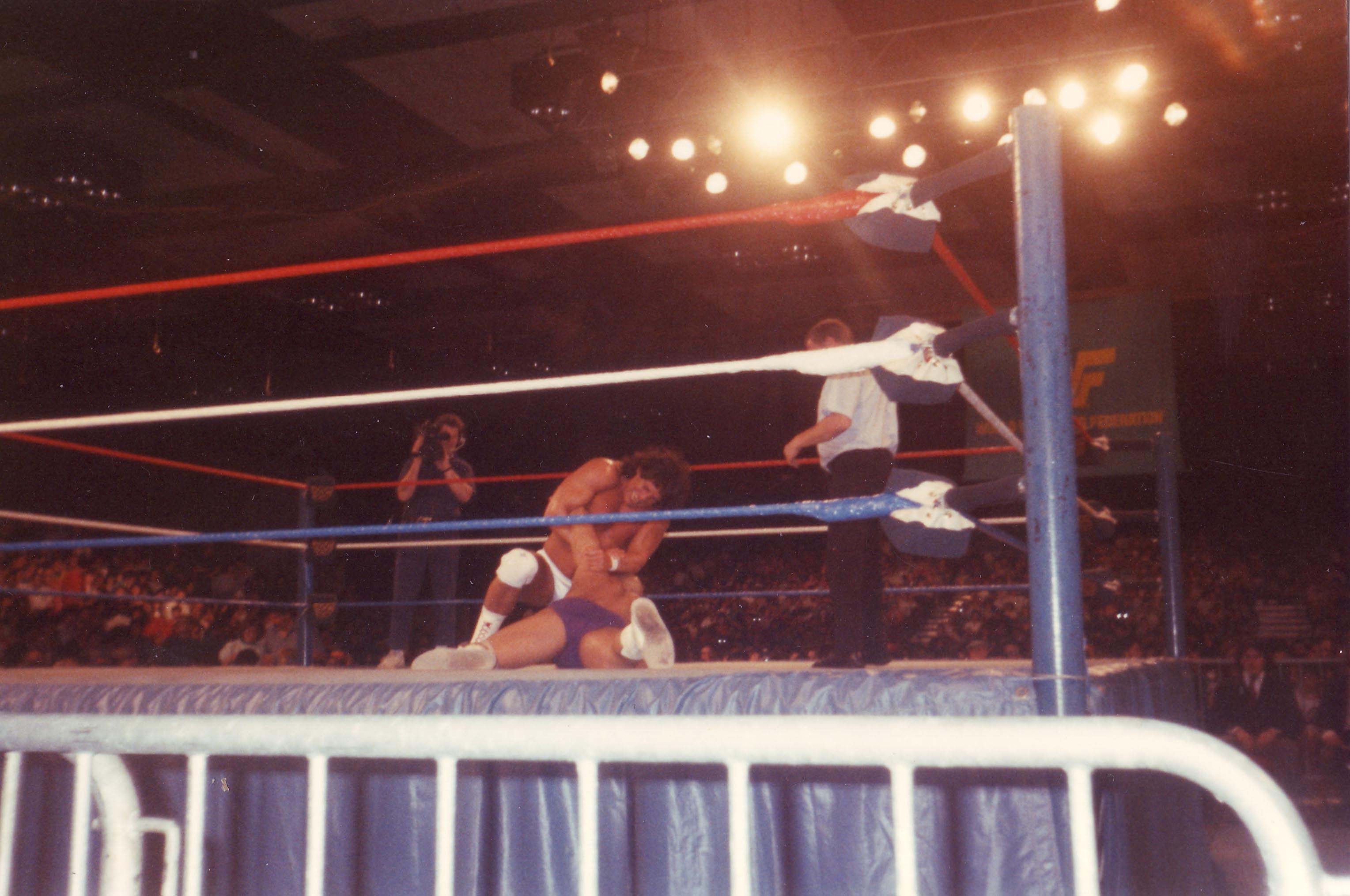
Estrada (purple shorts) being held to the canvas by Tito Santana on 7 March 1989

In 1987, José Estrada Jr. returned to the World Wrestling Federation, he adopted a new masked persona, known as Conquistador Dos, teaming with José Luis Rivera as Conquistador Uno, to form a team known as Los Conquistadores, which despite both wrestlers being Puerto Rican were billed as from "Somewhere in Latin America". The team was used mainly as enhancement talent, with their primary function to make other tag teams, especially face teams. Los Conquistadors participated in the 1988 Survivor Series. At the Survivor Series they were part of a "5 teams vs. 5 teams" special elimination match, teaming with Demolition (Ax and Smash), The Brain Busters (Arn Anderson and Tully Blanchard), The Bolsheviks (Nikolai Volkoff and Boris Zhukov), The Fabulous Rougeaus (Raymond and Jacques Rougeau). The five tag teams took on the collective face team of The Powers of Pain (The Warlord and The Barbarian), The Rockers (Shawn Michaels and Marty Jannetty), The British Bulldogs (Davey Boy Smith and Dynamite Kid), The Hart Foundation (Bret Hart and Jim Neidhart) and The Young Stallions (Jim Powers and Paul Roma). The match came down to Los Conquistadors and the Powers of Pain as the last team on each side, with The Powers of Pain winning after Demolition's manager Mr. Fuji switched sides and helped the Powers of Pain win the match. This match would make the only time Los Conquistadors would wrestle on a WWF pay per view (PPV) show. By 1989, Estrada worked in singles matches, both as "Conquistador Dos" and under his real name. He left the WWF in 1990.

=== Return to Puerto Rico (1989–1991) ===
Estrada returned to Puerto Rico once his WWF stint ended in the spring of 1989, once again working as Super Médico I. On May 28, 1989, he defeated Jonathan Holiday to win the WWC World Junior Heavyweight Championship for the first time. He would later lose the title to, and regain it from Chicky Star before losing it for good to Eddie Watts. As part of the feud with Chicky Starr, Starr managed to unmask Super Medico, who had to get under the ring to avoid the fans seeing his face. The following week, however, Starr tried the same trick again and actually took off Super Medico's mask, but this time Super Medico had painted his face white and caught Starr by surprise and pinned him, regaining the title (WWC TV show). In 1990, Estrada teamed up with a new Super Médico III, with his son José Estrada Jr. wearing the mask. The two defeated Los Mercenarios (Cuban Assassin and Jerry Morrow) March 31, 1990 to win the WWC World Tag Team Championship, Senior's fifth and Junior's first title reign. They lost the titles to Lance Idol and Rick Valentine but quickly regained them. In September the titles were held up after a brutal match against another masked tag team known as the Texas Hangmen (Killer and Psycho), but Los Super Médico won them back after another brutal match between the two teams on September 22, 1990, only to lose them to the Texas Hangmen a week later. On November 10 that same year Los Super Médicos defeated Eric Embry and Rick Valentine to win the WWC Caribbean Tag Team Championship for the first time. In December, they lost the titles back to Embry and Valentine, but regained them in January. The reign ended only days later when Valentine and Gran Mendoza defeated them for the championship.

=== Retirement ===
Estrada would retire by 1993, worked as a professional wrestling trainer in Humacao, Puerto Rico and makes special appearances at times until 2005. He worked with WWC in 2007 as a wrestling manager.

== Championships and accomplishments ==
- International Championship Wrestling
  - ICW Tag Team Championship (1 time) - with Black Gordman
- World Wrestling Council
  - WWC Caribbean Tag Team Championship (5 times) - with Super Medico II (3) Super Medico III (2)
  - WWC Junior Heavyweight Championship (2 times)
  - WWC North American Tag Team Championship (3 times) - with Super Medico II (2) and Invader III (1)
  - WWC Puerto Rico Heavyweight Championship (3 times)
  - WWC World Tag Team Championship (7 times) - with Super Medico II (2), Super Medico III (1), Black Gordman (1) and Super Medico III (3)
- Américas Wrestling Federation (Puerto Rico)
  - AWF World Tag Team Championship (3 times) - with 18k
- World Wide Wrestling Federation
  - WWWF Junior Heavyweight Championship (1 time)
- World Wrestling League
  - Salón de los Inmortales (class of 2015)

== Personal life ==
He is the godfather to Johnny Rodz' daughter.

== See also ==
- Professional wrestling in Puerto Rico
