= Survivor Series (1988) =

World Wrestling Federation pay-per-view event

- Promotional poster
- Promotion: World Wrestling Federation
- Date: November 24, 1988
- City: Richfield Township, Ohio
- Venue: Richfield Coliseum
- Attendance: 13,500
- Tagline: Teams of Five Strive to Survive!

Pay-per-view chronology
← Previous; SummerSlam	Next → Royal Rumble

Survivor Series chronology
← Previous; 1987	Next → 1989

The 1988 Survivor Series was a professional wrestling pay-per-view (PPV) event produced by the World Wrestling Federation (WWF, renamed WWE in 2002). It was the second annual Survivor Series event and took place on Thanksgiving Day in the United States on Thursday, November 24, 1988, at the Richfield Coliseum in Richfield Township, Ohio for a second consecutive year. The event centered on the Survivor Series match, a tag team elimination match that pits teams of multiple wrestlers against each other.

Four matches were contested at the event, all contested as Survivor Series matches. The main event was a 10-man Survivor Series match between a team captained by The Mega Powers (Hulk Hogan and "Macho Man" Randy Savage) and a team captained by The Twin Towers (Akeem and the Big Boss Man). Hogan and Savage were the survivors of the match.

== Production ==
=== Background ===
The second annual Survivor Series took place at the Richfield Coliseum in Richfield Township, Ohio for a second consecutive year.

On Thanksgiving Day in the United States in 1987, the professional wrestling promotion World Wrestling Federation (WWF, renamed WWE in 2002) debuted a pay-per-view (PPV) event titled Survivor Series. The event was characterized by featuring only tag team elimination matches that were named Survivor Series matches. Of the four matches at the inaugural event, three pitted teams of five wrestlers against each other, while the other featured five tag teams against each other (totaling 10 wrestlers per team), but with the stipulation being that if one member of a tag team was eliminated, both members of that particular tag team were eliminated. A second Survivor Series event was scheduled for 1988, establishing Survivor Series as an annual Thanksgiving event and becoming one of the promotions original four PPVs, along with WrestleMania, Royal Rumble, and SummerSlam, eventually referred to the "Big Four". It has also since become the second longest running PPV event in history (behind WrestleMania). Like the prior year, the event was scheduled to be held on Thanksgiving Day on Thursday, November 24, 1988, at the Richfield Coliseum in Richfield Township, Ohio for a second consecutive year.

=== Storylines ===
The main feud heading into Survivor Series pitted The Mega Powers (Hulk Hogan and WWF World Heavyweight Champion Randy Savage), Hercules, Koko B. Ware, and Hillbilly Jim against The Twin Towers (Akeem and the Big Boss Man), Ted DiBiase, Haku, and The Red Rooster. Hogan and Savage formed this alliance at WrestleMania IV in March 1988 after Hogan helped Savage in defeating DiBiase in the tournament final for the vacant WWF Championship. DiBiase and André the Giant faced Hogan and Savage at the inaugural SummerSlam in August where the Mega Powers won. DiBiase had bought the contract of André from Heenan at the inaugural Royal Rumble in January. In late 1988, DiBiase bought another contract from Heenan, that of Hercules, who was a powerful force in the WWF. Hercules refused to become DiBiase's slave and turned babyface and started feuding with DiBiase. DiBiase and other heel wrestlers joined The Twin Towers against Hercules, The Mega Powers and other babyface wrestlers.

Another major feud pitted Jake Roberts against André the Giant. The storyline began when Roberts exposed André's extreme fear of snakes on a recent edition of Saturday Night's Main Event XII. Roberts had thrown his snake, Damien, on the frightened André, who suffered a mild (kayfabe) heart attack. André vowed revenge, but Roberts constantly used Damien—either in their matches or by coming to the ring with a sack containing the snake during André's matches against other wrestlers—to gain a psychological edge.

The major tag team feud pitted WWF Tag Team Champions Demolition against The Powers of Pain, two teams known for their use of face paint and power brawling style of wrestling. The Powers, previously heels in Jim Crockett Promotions, had been brought into the WWF as babyface mercenaries by previous champions Strike Force (Rick Martel and Tito Santana) to avenge both their title loss to Demolition at WrestleMania IV and an injury Demolition had inflicted on Martel back in June. The other main feud pitted WWF Intercontinental Champion Ultimate Warrior vs. The Honky Tonk Man, the former champion who was determined to regain his title.

== Event ==
=== Preliminary matches ===
The first match of the event was a five-on-five Survivor Series match between the team of Ultimate Warrior, Brutus Beefcake, Sam Houston, The Blue Blazer (in his pay-per-view (PPV) debut), and Jim Brunzell, and the team of The Honky Tonk Man, Ron Bass, Danny Davis, Greg Valentine, and Bad News Brown; as such, this match was mainly among Intercontinental Championship contenders, and low to mid-card wrestlers. Don Muraco was originally scheduled to be a part of Warrior's team, but left the WWF, so he was replaced by Jim Brunzell. Beefcake scored the first victory of the night for Warrior's team, using a sleeper hold to force Davis to submit at the 1:18 mark. Brown evened the odds for the heel team about four minutes later, hitting Brunzell with a Ghetto Blaster, a type of kick to the back of the head. Not long thereafter, Valentine and Brown were setting Houston up for a double-team move when Houston dodged a running forearm club by Valentine, who instead struck Brown. Brown—playing up his character as an uncooperative loner—was angered and walked out of the match, getting himself counted out. Bass pinned Houston after a running powerslam, evening the sides at 3-apiece. The Blue Blazer used his speed to daze Valentine, but while attempting to finish the veteran Valentine off with a top-rope move, Honky ran over and pushed Blazer off the ropes; Valentine quickly applied a figure four leglock to force the submission. Beefcake then got the upper hand over Honky and locked on the sleeper hold, but Honky got to and slipped through the ropes, taking Beefcake with him; both men were ultimately counted out, leaving Warrior as the lone member of his team. Bass and Valentine worked over Warrior for a while, but Warrior dodged a double-clothesline attempt and knocked both men down, quickly pinning both men back-to-back—first Bass, then Valentine—with double axe handles to win the match and be the sole survivor.

Other on-screen personnel
Role:	Name:
Commentator	Gorilla Monsoon
Commentator	Jesse Ventura
Interviewer	Gene Okerlund
Interviewer	Sean Mooney
Ring announcer	Howard Finkel
Referee	Earl Hebner
Referee	Joey Marella
Referee	Tim White

The second Survivor Series match was a 10-on-10 variation of tag teams, in which if a wrestler from a tag team was eliminated, his partner was also eliminated. The match pitted the Powers of Pain (The Warlord and The Barbarian), The Rockers (Shawn Michaels and Marty Jannetty), The British Bulldogs (Davey Boy Smith and Dynamite Kid), The Hart Foundation (Bret Hart and Jim Neidhart), and The Young Stallions (Paul Roma and Jim Powers) against Demolition (Ax and Smash), The Brain Busters (Arn Anderson and Tully Blanchard), The Bolsheviks (Nikolai Volkoff and Boris Zhukov), The Fabulous Rougeaus (Jacques Rougeau and Raymond Rougeau), and The Conquistadors. Hart pinned Raymond with a small package, eliminating The Fabulous Rougeaus from the match. Zhukov hit a reverse diving crossbody on Powers and pinned him to eliminate The Young Stallions, but shortly after, he was pinned by Jannetty with a sunset flip, thus eliminating The Bolsheviks from the match. Hart hit a German suplex on Blanchard, but the referee saw his shoulders down, so he counted the pinfall, eliminating The Hart Foundation. The Rockers began brawling with Blanchard and his partner Anderson. The Rockers and the Brain Busters were both disqualified due to brawling in the ring and were eliminated. Dynamite hit Smash on the mat and went to the top rope. He tried to hit a diving headbutt, but Smash got up and clotheslined him and then pinned him to eliminate the British Bulldogs. Initially, Smash was unable to handle the powerful Barbarian of the Powers of Pain, but Demolition eventually gained the advantage when Ax moved out of the way of a charging Warlord, who injured his shoulder on the steel corner post of the ring. Both Demolition members took turns to work on Warlord's injured shoulder until the Powers of Pain looked ripe to be defeated. However, at this point, Demolition's manager Mr. Fuji opened the rope, causing his own man Smash to fall from the ring and get counted out, thus eliminating Demolition. Afterward, Ax confronted Fuji, who denied everything, but when Ax shoved him off and turned his back in disgust, a fuming Fuji struck him with his cane from behind. The sufficiently recovered Smash, who had been watching all this, collared the manager and threw him to Ax, who slammed him to the ringside mat, causing Demolition to turn babyface. After Demolition strode away to cheers from the crowd, The Powers of Pain momentarily resumed the match with the Conquistadors, but then they suddenly ceased and stepped out of the ring and turned heels when they picked the hated Fuji up off the floor, dusted him down and guided him round to their corner. Moments later, Fuji tripped Conquistador #1 with his cane, allowing the Barbarian to hit the masked man with a diving headbutt and pin him to eliminate The Conquistadors, making the Powers of Pain the survivors. After the match, the Powers celebrated with Fuji on their shoulders Demolition ran back to the ring and chased Warlord and Barbarian out to the floor where Fuji ordered them to retreat to the dressing room, leaving Demolition alone with the fans.

In the third Survivor Series match, André the Giant, Rick Rude, Dino Bravo, Mr. Perfect, and Harley Race fought against Jim Duggan, Jake Roberts, Scott Casey, Ken Patera, and Tito Santana. Junkyard Dog was originally scheduled to be a part of Roberts' team, but left WWF. B. Brian Blair replaced the Junkyard Dog to be a part of the team, but he also left WWF, so he was replaced by Scott Casey. Rude hit Patera with a Rude Awakening at 8:18 mark and pinned Patera to eliminate him, leaving Roberts' team with 4 members. A minute later, André's team member Bravo hit Casey with a side suplex and pinned Casey to eliminate him. Roberts' team was left with only three members, while André's team had still five members. However, Santana hit Race with a flying forearm smash and then pinned him to eliminate Race, leaving André's team with 4 members. Heel team captain André came in and quickly used his massive height and weight to crush and eventually pin Santana, leaving the heels with a 4–2 advantage. Later, Duggan used his 2×4 on Bravo, getting disqualified in the process. Roberts, the only member left on the face team, held his own and when Rude cockily attempted to tag one of his partners into the ring, he caught Rude from behind and hit with a DDT, eliminating him. André quickly got into the ring, applied a chokehold on Roberts, and refused to release it, getting disqualified in the process. Before André left, he headbutted Roberts. Perfect took advantage and pinned Roberts to win the match. Perfect and Bravo became the survivors for their team. After the match, Roberts recovered, retrieved Damien and chased Andre, Perfect, and Bravo from ringside.

=== Main event ===
In the main event, The Mega Powers (Hulk Hogan and Randy Savage), Hercules, Koko B. Ware, and Hillbilly Jim squared off against The Twin Towers (Akeem and The Big Boss Man), Ted DiBiase, Haku, and The Red Rooster. Savage hit a Savage Elbow on Rooster to pin and eliminate him, giving the Mega Powers a very early edge into the match. Akeem quickly evened the two sides after overpowering Hillbilly Jim and striking him with the Air Africa splash for the pin. Akeem's partner, the Big Boss Man, hit Koko with a Boss Man Slam to give the Twin Towers a 4–3 advantage. DiBiase's bodyguard Virgil distracted Hercules, allowing DiBiase to pin him with a schoolboy, leaving just team captains Hogan and Savage in the Mega Powers' corner. As DiBiase was taunting Hercules, Savage immediately pinned him with a schoolboy to eliminate him, leaving three members in Twin Towers' corner. Shortly thereafter, Slick (the manager of the Twin Towers) grabbed Elizabeth and—while pulling her away from ringside—began screaming threats at her, prompting Hogan to come to her rescue; Akeem and Boss Man intervened, hitting Hogan before Boss Man handcuffed Hogan to the ropes. In the process, Boss Man (the legal man in the ring) was counted out while Akeem was disqualified for shoving the referee and illegally double-teaming Savage. Haku, left as the only member of the heel team, dominated Savage for several minutes as Slick (who remained at ringside) taunted both Hogan and Elizabeth. Eventually, Haku accidentally kicked Slick from the ring apron (after a mistimed illegal double team on Savage) while Hogan clotheslined Heenan. After Elizabeth grabbed the key to unlock his handcuffs, Hogan was tagged into the match after Haku kicked an exhausted Savage into his corner. Hogan quickly dominated Haku and pinned him with a leg drop to score the win for the Mega Powers. After the match, Hogan began acting friendly toward Elizabeth, clearly upsetting Savage, whose reaction was known to the crowd and television audience, but not acknowledged by Hogan; pro-heel color commentator Jesse Ventura also picked up on this and interviewed Savage later about the incident.

== Aftermath ==
The Mega Powers were a powerful tag team throughout 1988, but their domination began to end as misunderstanding occurred between Hulk Hogan and Randy Savage in early 1989. This all began on January 7, 1989 Saturday Night's Main Event XIX, as Hogan was mercilessly beaten by The Twin Towers after his match with Akeem. Savage came out and cleared the ring with a steel chair. Elizabeth took Hogan to the backstage area, which angered Savage. He thought that he was a third wheel and this was the beginning of the breakup of Mega Powers as Savage was angry as to why Miss Elizabeth was used by Hogan as his manager. He confronted her about the issue, but she took Hogan backstage. Problems increased further in the Royal Rumble match, where Hogan accidentally eliminated Savage as he was trying to eliminate Bad News Brown. On February 3 The Main Event II, Hogan and Savage faced The Twin Towers (Akeem and the Big Boss Man) in a tag team match, filled with controversy. During the climax of the match, Akeem threw Savage on top of Elizabeth, knocking her out cold. Hogan picked her up and took her backstage, leaving Savage alone to face the Towers while Hogan tended to Elizabeth. When Hogan came back, Savage slapped him in the face and took the belt in his hand and turned heel by abandoning Hogan. Though he was abandoned by Savage, Hogan managed to pick up the win. Mega Powers disbanded as Hogan and Savage feuded with each other. At WrestleMania V, Hogan defeated Savage in a match that was billed "The Mega Powers Explode" to win the WWF World Heavyweight Championship, ending Savage's reign of 371 days.

The feud between Demolition and the Powers of Pain took on its new twist, as now Demolition was the face team and the Powers of Pain were the villains. Mr. Fuji constantly interfered in his team's matches against Demolition, and eventually, a 2-on-3 match was signed for WrestleMania V, with Fuji joining the Powers of Pain. At WrestleMania, Demolition was able to gain their final revenge on Fuji when—after his mistimed attempt to throw salt in Smash's eyes—he was caught in Demolition's finishing move, the Demolition Decapitation.

The other feud that continued to headline was Jake Roberts vs. André the Giant, who continued to feud until WrestleMania V, by which time, the returning Big John Studd (now competing as a face) had involved himself in the feud by being the guest referee for the André-Roberts match. Prior to that, at the 1989 Royal Rumble, André immediately attacked Roberts when the latter entered the ring during the main event, choking Roberts to the brink of unconsciousness before throwing him out; Roberts recovered within 10 minutes, retrieved his snake, Damien, and scared André from the ring.

Following Survivor Series, Rick Rude began targeting Ultimate Warrior for his WWF Intercontinental Championship, badgering him into a posedown at the Royal Rumble. The Honky Tonk Man, meanwhile, continued to be unsuccessful against the Warrior (in a bid to regain the title) and, shortly after their last match aired on Saturday Night's Main Event XIX, began losing his push and was demoted to mid-card matches.

Danny Davis would return to refereeing in 1989 on a "probationary basis" after his nearly two-year run as a wrestler and would continue in that capacity until 1995. The Rockers' and Brain Busters' feud would continue both on WWF TV and the house show circuit through the end of 1988 into 1989. This was Ken Patera's final appearance for the WWF.

For The British Bulldogs, this was their last appearance in the WWF as a tag team; the Dynamite Kid was gone for good, while Davey Boy Smith would return in 1990 as a singles competitor known as "The British Bulldog." They left, in part, shortly after a series of practical jokes and altercations with The Rougeau Brothers got out of hand, culminating in Jacques Rougeau knocking several of Dynamite's teeth out with a sucker punch shortly before Survivor Series.

== Home media and streaming ==
The event was released on VHS by Coliseum Video in the United States and in 1991 by Silver Vision in the United Kingdom during a period in which the WWF back catalogue was being re-released in the UK. For the home video release, the event was edited down to two hours, with some matches shortened. A previously unbroadcast interview with Randy Savage was included, as well as a specially recorded outro.

An early version of the UK VHS release included an error on the cover that had to be hand corrected.

In November 2004, it was re-released on DVD in the United Kingdom as part of Silver Vision's Tagged Classics range, and was paired with Survivor Series 1987. This DVD set was not released in the USA.

In 2014, the event was included on the WWE's streaming platform the WWE Network as part of its launch and remained on the service until the platform closed in 2026. In November 2024, WWE uploaded the 10-on-10 tag team match to stream freely on their WWE Vault YouTube channel.

As of October 2026, subscribers in multiple territories, including the US, Canada and the UK, can stream the event on Netflix, thanks to the WWE's ten-year agreement with the company.

== Results ==
No.	Results	Stipulations	Times
1	Ultimate Warrior, Brutus Beefcake, Sam Houston, The Blue Blazer, and Jim Brunzell defeated The Honky Tonk Man, Ron Bass, Danny Davis, Greg Valentine, and Bad News Brown (with Jimmy Hart)	5-on-5 Survivor Series match^{Eliminations}	17:50
2	The Powers of Pain (The Warlord and The Barbarian), The Rockers (Shawn Michaels and Marty Jannetty), The British Bulldogs (Davey Boy Smith and Dynamite Kid), The Hart Foundation (Bret Hart and Jim Neidhart), and The Young Stallions (Paul Roma and Jim Powers) defeated Demolition (Ax and Smash), The Brain Busters (Arn Anderson and Tully Blanchard), The Bolsheviks (Nikolai Volkoff and Boris Zhukov), The Fabulous Rougeaus (Jacques and Raymond), and The Conquistadors (Uno and Dos) (with Mr. Fuji, Bobby Heenan, Slick and Jimmy Hart)	10-on-10 Survivor Series tag team match^{Eliminations}	42:12
3	André the Giant, Rick Rude, Dino Bravo, Mr. Perfect, and Harley Race (Bobby Heenan and Frenchy Martin) defeated Jim Duggan, Jake Roberts, Scott Casey, Ken Patera, and Tito Santana	5-on-5 Survivor Series match^{Eliminations}	30:03
4	The Mega Powers (Hulk Hogan and Randy Savage), Hercules, Koko B. Ware, and Hillbilly Jim (with Miss Elizabeth) defeated The Twin Towers (Akeem and The Big Boss Man), Ted DiBiase, King Haku, and The Red Rooster (with Slick, Virgil and Bobby Heenan)	5-on-5 Survivor Series match^{Eliminations}	29:10

=== Survivor Series matches ===
^1

Eliminated	Wrestler	Eliminated by	Method	Time
1	Danny Davis	Brutus Beefcake	Technical submission	1:18
2	Jim Brunzell	Bad News Brown	Pinfall	5:12
3	Bad News Brown	N/A	Countout	7:50
4	Sam Houston	Ron Bass	Pinfall	10:09
5	The Blue Blazer	Greg Valentine	Submission	12:29
6	Brutus Beefcake	N/A	Double countout	15:44
6	The Honky Tonk Man	N/A	Double countout	15:44
8	Ron Bass	Ultimate Warrior	Pinfall	17:30
9	Greg Valentine	Ultimate Warrior	Pinfall	17:50
Sole Survivor:	Ultimate Warrior			

^2

Eliminated	Wrestler	Eliminated by	Method	Time
1	Raymond Rougeau	Bret Hart	Pinfall	5:22
2	Jim Powers	Boris Zhukov	Pinfall	15:20
3	Boris Zhukov	Marty Jannetty	Pinfall	18:09
4	Bret Hart	Tully Blanchard	Pinfall	27:03
5	The Rockers	N/A	Double disqualification	27:57
5	The Brain Busters	N/A	Double disqualification	27:57
7	Dynamite Kid	Smash	Pinfall	36:02
8	Smash	N/A	Countout	39:33
9	Uno	The Barbarian	Pinfall	42:12
Survivors:	The Powers of Pain (The Barbarian and The Warlord)			

^3

Eliminated	Wrestler	Eliminated by	Method	Time
1	Ken Patera	Rick Rude	Pinfall	8:18
2	Scott Casey	Dino Bravo	Pinfall	9:27
3	Harley Race	Tito Santana	Pinfall	13:19
4	Tito Santana	André the Giant	Pinfall	14:40
5	Jim Duggan	N/A	Disqualification	21:22
6	Rick Rude	Jake Roberts	Pinfall	28:45
7	André the Giant	N/A	Disqualification	29:39
8	Jake Roberts	Mr. Perfect	Pinfall	30:03
Survivors:	Mr. Perfect & Dino Bravo			

^4

Eliminated	Wrestler	Eliminated by	Method	Time
1	The Red Rooster	Randy Savage	Pinfall	6:11
2	Hillbilly Jim	Akeem	Pinfall	9:59
3	Koko B. Ware	The Big Boss Man	Pinfall	11:45
4	Hercules	Ted DiBiase	Pinfall	16:35
5	Ted DiBiase	Randy Savage	Pinfall	16:57
6	The Big Boss Man	N/A	Countout	23:24
7	Akeem	N/A	Disqualification	25:01
8	Haku	Hulk Hogan	Pinfall	29:10
Survivors:	Randy Savage and Hulk Hogan			
