= Jose Luis Rivera =

Puerto Rican professional wrestler (born 1953)

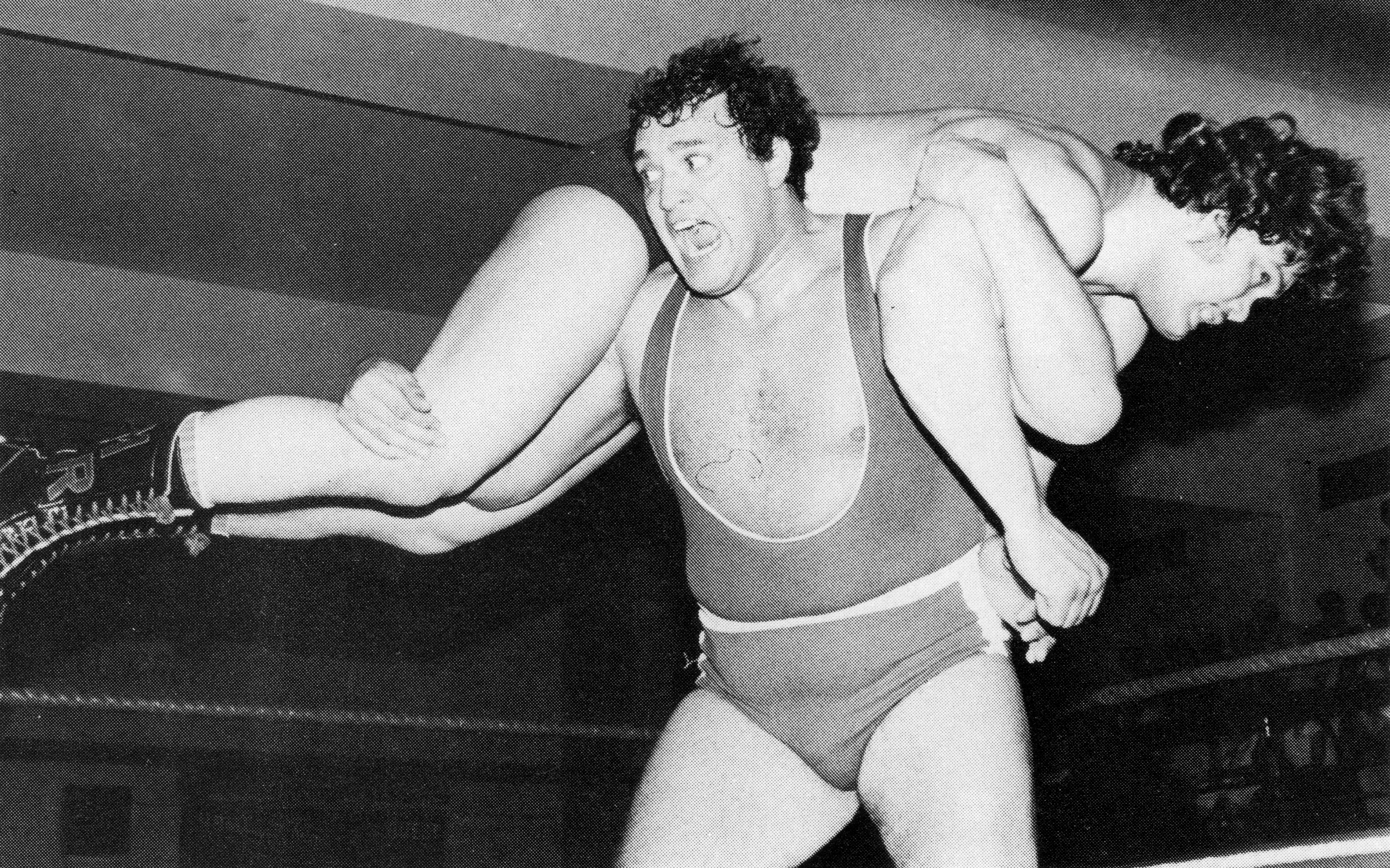
- Rivera caught in an airplane spin by Salvatore Bellomo during a 1982 match

Personal information
- Born: Marcelino Rivera Alicea; 25 January 1953 (age 73) Mayagüez, Puerto Rico

Professional wrestling career
- Ring names: Jose Luis Rivera; Mac Rivera; Black Demon; Red Demon; Conquistador Uno; Conquistador #1; El Sultán Jose Luis Rivera; Shadow #2
- Billed height: 6 ft 2 in (1.88 m)
- Billed weight: 249 lb (113 kg)
- Billed from: "Somewhere in Latin America"; Puerto Rico
- Trained by: Diablo Velasco
- Debut: 1973
- Retired: 2014

Marcelino Rivera Alicea (born August 6, 1953), better known as Jose Luis Rivera, is a Puerto Rican retired professional wrestler. He is notable for his time in the World Wrestling Federation (today known as WWE) where he was also known as Conquistador #1 or Conquistador Uno when he teamed with fellow Puerto Rican José Estrada Sr.

== Professional wrestling career ==
=== Early career (1973–1976) ===
Rivera made his wrestling debut in April 1973 working for promoter Arturo Mendoza in the west of Puerto Rico.

=== National Wrestling Alliance (1976–1982) ===
Jose Luis Rivera started his professional wrestling career in the National Wrestling Alliance (NWA) in the state of Florida. According to Rivera, he also wrestled amateur in the gyms before going professional and wrestling the likes of "Superstar" Billy Graham, Ox Baker, and Ivan Koloff.

=== World Wrestling Federation (1982–1991) ===
In 1982, Rivera went to the WWF. Rivera then changed his nickname to Mac Rivera and was mostly used as a face preliminary wrestler for WWF TV-Tapings, excluding a non-televised event in which Rivera participated in a 22-men Battle Royal won by Bob Orton Jr. After a losing streak during all of 1982 and early 1983, Rivera defeated "Baron" Mikel Scicluna on New York City at Madison Square Garden on March 20 in a match where Scicluna believed he would win. Rivera, however was unable to step up the card and eventually continued his losing streak, as Jose Luis Rivera and occasionally as Mac Rivera as well, but defeated Scicluna again at a WWF untelevised event on May, 18. Untelevised victories over fellow preliminary wrestlers Rene Goulet, Butcher Vachon, Bob Bradley followed, with Rivera eventually ending 1983 in a winning streak. Rivera started 1984 continuing his winning streak throughout January of that year with televised victories over fellow preliminary wrestlers Tony Colón, Frankie Williams, and Israel Matia, and an untelevised victory over John Callahan but was eventually defeated by another preliminary wrestler, Tiger Chung Lee. Starting with an untelevised $20.000 battle royal won by André the Giant on January 21, Rivera was once again unable to move up the card and found himself on the losing end of many matches, losing to more-established stars such as S. D. Jones, Mr. Fuji, and Tony Garea, although Rivera was victorious in matches against less-established wrestlers such as Charlie Fulton and Fred Marzino. One of Rivera's highlights was a boxing match against "Boxing" Bob Orton, Jr. in early 1986. Orton won the match by TKO. This was a "warmup" for Orton as he had an upcoming boxing match against Mr. T.

On March 17, 1987, Rivera teamed with fellow preliminary wrestler Randy Colley to form the team of The Shadows. Colley was known as "Shadow #1" while Rivera was known as "Shadow #2" and making their debut as a team on that same date defeating the team of Lanny Poffo and Nick Kiniski. The Shadows' success however, didn't last long, and they started a feud with fellow preliminary team of Paul Roma and Jim Powers, known as The Young Stallions, Rivera and Colley lost every match they had with the Stallions through early to mid 1987, and although Rivera was able to beat Jim Powers in some house show-matches, they didn't find success in later months, with Powers gaining a victory over Rivera in a house-show match in October 1987. The Shadows also had a minor feud with The Killer Bees a team composed of "Jumpin" Jim Brunzell and B. Brian Blair and lost every match they had with the Bees. Through 1987, Rivera exclusively wrestled at house shows and didn't appear on TV until November 17. Rivera and Colley quietly disbanded, and Rivera started teaming with fellow prelim. wrestler and Puerto Rican Jose Estrada, Sr. Rivera and Estrada's first match as a team was an untelevised match which seemed to be a one-time pairing between Estrada and Rivera against The Killer Bees on November 15. As usual, Rivera and Estrada were defeated.

Rivera and Estrada debuted their "Conquistador" outfit and masks on the same date Rivera reappeared on TV, this time as "Los Conquistadores" Rivera and Estrada wrestled in their first match as an official team Strike Force, a team composed of Tito Santana and Rick Martel. Rivera and Estrada as usual, were defeated. According to Rivera, both of them went to Vince McMahon and told him about the idea of the pairing, and according to Rivera, McMahon liked the idea. Rivera and Estrada ended 1987 with a losing streak, including losing five matches in a row at house show - matches against The Rougeau Brothers, a team composed of Jacques Rougeau and Raymond Rougeau. In 1988, Rivera and Estrada continued teaming together, usually on the losing side of many of their matches, such as The Killer Bees, The British Bulldogs (a team composed of Dynamite Kid and Davey Boy Smith) and The Young Stallions. However, Rivera and Estrada surprisingly scored a victory (albeit untelevised) over the Rougeau Brothers on January 10, which became one of the team's highlights. Success for the team came again on February 15, where Rivera and Estrada surprisingly defeated the team of The Killer Bees, albeit once again untelevised. On November 30, success for the team of Rivera and Estrada came as they defeated one of the most pushed tag-teams at the time, The Rockers, a team composed of Shawn Michaels and Marty Jannetty. The Conquistadors' biggest highlight as team came at Survivor Series (1988) where they were among the final teams in the ring alongside The Powers of Pain. The Conquistadors came close to winning, but The Powers of Pain won after help from manager Mr. Fuji. By 1989, the teaming of Rivera and Estrada became more and more infrequent, with Rivera eventually starting to use his old ring name of "Jose Luis Rivera" although he continued to appear as "Conquistador #1" on TV-Tapings, and by this time, he also turned face. Constantly on the losing end of matches against established wrestlers such as Nikolai Volkoff, and Jim Duggan, Rivera occasionally gained victories over fellow preliminary wrestlers such as Steve Lombardi and Paul Roma. Rivera had an opportunity to face his former partner on November 27, appearing as "Jose Luis Rivera" and Estrada appearing as "Conquistador #1", with Rivera winning. In 1990, Estrada left the WWF, and Rivera continued appearing as "Conquistador #1". Rivera's first and only victory in that year came on January 15, where he defeated Brian Costello. On November 20, Rivera teamed with Chris Hawn to face his old rival and recently turned heel Paul Roma and Hercules Hernandez, known as Power and Glory. Rivera and Hawn were defeated. Rivera worked as the Black Demon in 1991, his last match was a lost to the British Bulldog on May 29 on Wrestling Challenge which aired June 30. He then departed after a full decade of working with the company.

=== World Championship Wrestling (1991) ===
In 1991, Rivera signed a contract with World Championship Wrestling (WCW). Rivera, nicknamed The Black Angel wrestled only three untelevised matches (all of which he lost). During this time, Rivera also challenged champion Tom Zenk for the WCW World Television Title, but was unsuccessful.

=== Puerto Rico (1991–1994, 2006–2007, 2014) ===
After leaving both the WWF and WCW, Rivera returned to his homeland, Puerto Rico in late 1991. Rivera signed with a local promotion, American Wrestling Federation (AWF) successfully challenging (and winning) the AWF Americas Title from then champion Ricky Sexton in his very debut with the company. On January 31, 1992, Rivera dropped the AWF Americas Title to Jason The Terrible. Rivera regained the title on February 22, but ultimately dropped it permanently to Huracán Castillo, Jr. Rivera left the AWF and signed a contract with rival promotion World Wrestling Council (WWC) and remained with promotion until 1994. On March 19, 1994, Rivera had what was considered at the time, his last match, facing and defeating local wrestler El Exotico.

In 2005, after an 11-year hiatus from wrestling, Rivera returned on November 11 to World Wrestling Council, now considered a legend to the promotion, he wrestled in a tag-team match teaming up with fellow local wrestler Dr. Cesar Vargas to defeat the team of Rivera's WWF partner and rival, Jose Estrada, Sr. and Rico Suave. In 2006, after a 12-year hiatus from wrestling, Rivera returned on January 8, where he was defeated by local wrestler Glamour Boy Shane. Rivera signed with an independent promotion named New Wrestling Stars (NWS) working as Sultán Jose Luis Rivera. Rivera had two matches, the aforementioned defeat against Boy Shane, and a second match where he teamed up with El Nene to defeat the team of Boy Shane and Huracán Castillo, Jr. On October 29, Rivera appeared at an independent local promotion, where he defeated local wrestler, Wizard. In 2007, Rivera had two appearances at another local promotion. On January 14, 2007, Rivera teamed with fellow local wrestlers Shijan Rek and Renegade to defeat the team of Van Axel, Stryder, El Assassin in an "Australian Rules" match. Then on February 13 that same year Rivera defeated El Profe by disqualification.

On January 25, 2014, Rivera surprisingly reappeared in the APW "Wrestle-Reunion 3" at a Royal Rumble match won by local wrestler Shayne Hawke.

== Personal life ==
On October 14, 2022, it was said that Rivera died. This confused some fans. It was not Rivera; it was Jose Rivera (Jose Santiago) who worked as El Invader and Hurricane Rivera in Puerto Rico, NWA and WWWF in the early 1970s.

Rivera appears in Brad Balukjian's book The Six Pack: On the Open Road in Search of Wrestlemania released in 2024. He was interviewed by Balukjian in 2022.

He has worked as a Corrections Officer in the Puerto Rico Department of Corrections and Rehabilitation since 1993.

== Championships and accomplishments ==
- Americas Wrestling Federation (Puerto Rico)
  - AWF Americas Championship (3 times)
- Pro Wrestling Federation
  - PWF Tag-Team Championship (2 times) - with Super Ninja (1) and Terry Austin (1)
- Pro Wrestling Illustrated
  - PWI ranked him #387 of the top 500 singles wrestlers in the PWI 500 in 1991
- New England Pro Wrestling Hall of Fame
  - Class of 2014
- World Wrestling League
  - Salón de los inmortales (Class of 2019)
