= Los Conquistadores =

Professional wrestling tag team

Los Conquistadors

Statistics
- Name(s): The Conquistadors; Conquistador No. 1 & No. 2 Los Conquistadores; Uno & Dos
- Members: Numerous wrestlers have portrayed
- Debut: 1987–1990, 2000, 2003, 2018

Los Conquistadores were a villainous jobber professional wrestling tag team in the World Wrestling Federation (WWF), consisting of two masked wrestlers known as One (or Spanish Uno for "one") and Two (or Spanish Dos for "two"). The original team consisted of José Estrada Sr. and Jose Luis Rivera.

Several other wrestlers made use of the gimmick in 2000 and 2003. Edge and Christian and the Hardy Boyz both won the WWF World Tag Team Championship as Los Conquistadores, although their reigns were later credited under their actual team names.

== History ==
Beginnings

=== 1987 ===
The Shadows was the name of a masked heel jobber professional wrestling tag team in the WWF in 1987. The team consisted of two masked wrestlers known as Light and Dark or simply "Shadow No. 1" and "Shadow No. 2". Randy Colley was "Shadow No. 1", and Jose Luis Rivera who was "Shadow No. 2". Colley was previously part of the tag team Demolition as the original Smash, and before that a tag team called The Moondogs as Moondog Rex and was a one-time WWF Tag Team Champion with Moondog King and then later Moondog Spot.

The Moondogs were very successful since they had held the WWF tag team title once as well having won many tag team titles in the World Wrestling Council (WWC). Rivera had wrestled in the WWF before as The Red Demon, and under his real name, and under both identities wrestled against both babyfaces and heels. Shortly after Colley left Demolition and was replaced by Barry Darsow, Colley and Rivera would form the masked Shadows tag-team, and they would make their debut as a team in Worcester, Massachusetts, on March 17, 1987, at a house show defeating the team of Lanny Poffo and Nick Kiniski, and The Shadows would have their first TV match also in Worcester, Massachusetts, on April 23, 1987, when they teamed with fellow jobber "Iron" Mike Sharp and lost to Blackjack Mulligan, Billy Jack Haynes and Tito Santana.

The Shadows also had a few matches against The Rockers (Shawn Michaels and Marty Jannetty) during the Rockers first stint in the WWF (which only lasted two weeks, and which after they were fired) in 1987. Since the Shadows wore matching outfits of either black or white or black or grey and had nearly identical builds, the referees could not tell them apart, which allowed the team to make a lot of illegal switches during matches. The Shadows would also have a minor feud with The Killer Bees (a team composed of "Jumpin'" Jim Brunzell and B. Brian Blair) and would lose every match they had with the Bees. The Shadows scored a rare victory in Detroit, Michigan when the defeated they team of S. D. Jones and Lanny Poffo.

The Shadows faced many top tag-teams like The Fabulous Rougeaus (Jacques and Raymond), The Can-Am Connection, (Rick Martel and Tom Zenk), and Strike Force (Rick Martel and Tito Santana), and gave those teams many hard matches, though the Shadows always lost. The Shadows had very little success and never appeared on a pay-per-view card, though they did appear on a Coliseum WWF home video VHS cassette called WWF High Flyers in which they had a match against the team of Paul Roma and Jim Powers, (known as The Young Stallions), and it was a match that which the Shadows had with the Stallions where Vince McMahon called Roma and Powers "two young stallions" thus naming the team.

The Shadows would lose every match they had with the Stallions through early to mid 1987, and although Rivera was able to beat Jim Powers in some house show matches, but he did not keep his winning streak as Powers would avenge his loss with a victory over Rivera in a house show match in October 1987. Rivera's partner Colley would also lose a match to Powers' partner Roma at a Boston Gardens house show. Colley and Rivera would continue to wrestle exclusively at house shows and wouldn't reappear on TV until November 17. Shortly after the Shadows then quietly disbanded. After the Shadows disbanded, Colley then left the WWF and joined Continental Wrestling where he wrestled as Detroit Demolition, based on his version of Smash, while Rivera stayed with the WWF and formed Los Conquistadores with José Estrada Sr.

Los Conquistadors

=== 1987–1991 ===
After Colley's departure in November, Rivera began teaming with fellow Puerto Rican José Estrada Sr.. Wrestling as a masked foreign heel team, clad in golden body suits and billed as being "from somewhere in Latin America", the new team made its debut on November 14, 1987 at a house show in Fort Wayne, Indiana, where they faced The Killer Bees. Just weeks after The Shadows disbanded, the Conquistadors made their television debut on the November 29 episode of Wrestling Challenge, where they were defeated by The British Bulldogs. On the December 5th episode of WWF Superstars of Wrestling, the Conquistadors would be defeated by WWF Tag Team Champions Strike Force. Rivera and Estrada were immediately programmed into a house show series with the Young Stallions, and also fell to the young babyface team on the December 21 episode of Prime Time Wrestling. On December 27, 1988, the Conquistadors gained their first victory when they upset The Rougeau Brothers in Toronto, Ontario.

The Conquistadors however were slotted at the very bottom of the WWF tag-team pool, and were used primarily as enhancement talent. They next appeared on the January 15, 1988, episode of Prime Time Wrestling, where they teamed with The Bolsheviks in a losing efforts to The Killer Bees, George Steele, and The Junkyard Dog. They absorbed numerous additional losses to the Stallions and Bulldogs, but almost inexplicably upset The Rougeau Brothers again in a return match in Toronto on January 10, 1988. On February 15, after absorbing multiple losses to the Killer Bees, Rivera and Estrada defeated Blair and Brunzell at a house show in Omaha, NE. Four days later, the duo gained their first televised victory when they defeated Brady Boone and Omar Atlas on Prime Time Wrestling. On April 9, 1988 the masked heels faced former WWF Tag-Team Champions Strike Force again on WWF Superstars; once more they were defeated.

During the spring of 1988, Estrada was out of action leaving Jose Luis Rivera to soldier on in singles action, where he competed as "The Conquistador". In matches over the next few months he would face Outback Jack and Jake Roberts, and picked up a televised victory when he defeated Jerry Allen on Prime Time Wrestling on June 4. Estrada would return however on June 21, and the Conquistadors were defeated once more by The Young Stallions on a house show. Six days later they made their televised return and were beaten by The Rougeau Brothers.

After a long string of defeats to Jim Powers and Paul Roma, the Conquistadors were finally able to get a measure of revenge when they upset The Young Stallions at a house show in Warwick, Rhode Island, on July 3, 1988. They then transitioned to a house show series with the newly arrived Rockers (Shawn Michaels and Marty Jannetty), and wrestled them on July 18 edition of Prime Time Wrestling. After several losses to the Rockers, the Conquistadors rebounded to defeat another new arrival in Terry Taylor, as well as Sam Houston on the August 1 edition of Prime Time Wrestling. On the August 13 edition of WWF Superstars, Conquistador #1 challenged WWF World Champion Randy Savage. Despite being seconded by his partner, he was beaten. The Rockers dominated their feud with The Conquistadors throughout the remainder of the summer; they returned to television on the September 27th edition of Prime Time and were once more defeated by The Young Stallions. However three days later the Conquistadors gained a measure of revenge when they upset The Rockers at a house show in Denver, CO.

As November approached the World Wrestling Federation prepared for its second annual Survivor Series; on November 13 on Wrestling Challenge the masked duo was named as one of the ten participating teams in the 10-team survivor match. Two days later on the November 15th edition of Prime Time, the Conquistadors earned a victory over John Latu and Bob Emory in the run-up to the big event. They made their pay per view debut, as part of the 10-team elimination match at the Survivor Series 1988, where The Conquistadors and The Powers of Pain were the last two teams left in the ring. After shocking the wrestling world by outlasting several formidable tandems, The Conquistadors eventually lost when Mr. Fuji tripped up Uno and The Barbarian hit him with a headbutt to win the match for The Powers of Pain.

Despite lasting until the end of the team elimination match at the Survivor Series, the Conquistadors temporarily forayed into singles action on the house show circuit as 1989 began, wrestling opponents like Jim Powers, Paul Roma, The Blue Blazer (Owen Hart), and Sam Houston. On the March 15, 1989, episode of Wrestling Challenge, the Conquistadors reunited to face the newly arrived Bushwhackers and were defeated. On April 10th, the duo faced The Young Stallions yet again on Prime Time Wrestling and were defeated once more. After this, the team disbanded once more, with a final partnership taking place on the September 25, 1989, episode of Prime Time Wrestling, where they were defeated by longtime nemesis The Rockers </ref>. Jose Luis Rivera returned in November 1989 as Conquistador #1, wrestling in singles matches against Mark Young, Tito Santana, Greg Valentine, and Hercules, and facing Intercontinental Champion Ultimate Warrior on the December 10, 1989, episode of Wrestling Challenge. Rivera continued on in singles competition through 1990.

In April 1991, The Conquistadors wrestled in the Universal Wrestling Federation in a match defeating The Power Twins by DQ.

=== 2000 ===
In the year 2000, Edge and Christian engaged in a lengthy feud with The Hardy Boyz, capturing the WWF Tag Team Championship from Edge and Christian in a steel cage match at Unforgiven. The following day the Hardys won a ladder match that included a stipulation barring Edge and Christian from receiving another title shot for the duration of the Hardy Boyz' championship reign.

Weeks later, Los Conquistadors made their return, though they did not physically resemble Rivera and Estrada; rather, the team looked and acted more like Edge and Christian, a suspicion that was boosted by Los Conquistadors immediately targeting the Hardy Boyz in the hopes of getting a shot at the titles. They later won a tag-team battle royal on SmackDown! to earn a title shot. After the match, a vignette showed Los Conquistadors being congratulated backstage by Edge and Christian. Since they were seen with Los Conquistadors, Edge and Christian claimed there was no way they could be Los Conquistadors. Their title shot came at No Mercy, where they defeated the Hardys using tactics similar to those employed by Edge and Christian, including Conquistador Dos using Christian's finisher the Unprettier to win the match. Backstage, Edge and Christian, looking like they had just come out of the showers, politely challenged Los Conquistadors for a title shot the next night. On Raw the following night, Edge looked confident as he made his way through the backstage area toward the ring, until he found Christian seemingly put through a table. Edge was left to fight Los Conquistadors by himself, and was shocked when they quickly defeated him. When Christian showed up at ringside, Los Conquistadors unmasked themselves, revealing themselves to be Matt Hardy and Jeff Hardy. They explained that they had attacked Edge and Christian's hired goons (Christopher Daniels and Aaron Aguilera, who had doubled for Los Conquistadors in backstage segments) backstage and stole the costumes.

As Edge and Christian complained, it was declared that Edge and Christian's title victory the previous night was official. At the same time, because the Hardy Boyz had just defeated the champions, commissioner Mick Foley ruled they were now the tag team champions. After being outsmarted by the Hardy Boyz, Edge and Christian gave up the golden costumes of Los Conquistadors. In line with the stipulations of the prior ladder match, the ban on Edge and Christian challenging for the championships had ended when "Los Conquistadors" defeated the Hardy Boyz for the titles, so Edge and Christian could wrestle for the titles again without disguises.

=== 2003 ===
On the July 17, 2003, edition of SmackDown!, Rob Conway and Nick Dinsmore, who were both working in Ohio Valley Wrestling at the time, assumed the roles of Los Conquistadors in a match in which they were defeated by Rey Mysterio and Billy Kidman. Unlike previous versions of Los Conquistadors, Conway and Dinsmore wore black and gold masks with exposed mouths along with blue shoulder pads.

On July 27, 2003, another set of Conquistadors participated in the APA Invitational Barroom Brawl Match at Vengeance, where they were beaten up by the APA. In this case, the OVW wrestlers working under the masks were Rob Conway and Johnny Jeter.

=== 2018 ===
On the October 8, 2018, episode of Raw, a man dressed in a Conquistador outfit, later revealed to be Kurt Angle, won a WWE World Cup Qualifying Battle Royal by last eliminating Baron Corbin. The next week on Raw, jobber Billy Bain dressed as a Conquistador (assumed to be Angle) to take on The Authors of Pain in a losing effort.

== Other media ==
The Los Conquistadors costumes of Edge and Christian from 2000 were made available as alternative outfits in the video game WWE SmackDown vs. Raw 2011.

== Championships and accomplishments ==
- New England Pro Wrestling Hall of Fame
  - Class of 2014 (José Luis Rivera)
- World Wrestling Federation
  - WWF World Tag Team Championship – Edge and Christian (1), The Hardy Boyz (1)
- World Wrestling League
  - Salón de los Inmortales 2015 (José Estrada, Sr.)
  - Salón de los Inmortales 2016 (José Luis Rivera)
