= Mario Mancini =

American professional wrestler (born 1966)

Personal information
- Born: Leonard Inzitari; June 21, 1966 (age 59) Stamford, Connecticut
- Spouse(s): Victoria Pelkey (1986–1987); Jessica Alvarez (1993–1999); Dawn Habib (2006–2018)
- Children: 3

Professional wrestling career
- Billed height: 5 ft 10 in (1.78 m)
- Billed weight: 231 lb (105 kg)
- Trained by: Tony Altomare
- Debut: July 31, 1984
- Retired: November 13, 2021

Mario Mancini (born Leonard Inzitari; June 21, 1966) is a retired American professional wrestler who mainly worked in the World Wrestling Federation (WWF) as a babyface jobber from 1984 to 1991. He was The Undertaker's first ever opponent on an edition of WWF Superstars, taped on November 19, 1990, but not aired on television until December 15, 1990 (thus not The Undertaker's first televised debut).

== Wrestling career ==
=== Beginnings ===
Mancini's father had gone to school with former WWF wrestler Tony Altomare, and he eventually convinced him to train him. Mario trained his entire senior year of high school. On July 31, 1984, Mancini and fellow students Dave Barbie, AJ Petrucci, and Robby Parliament accompanied Altomare to a WWF taping in Poughkeepsie. Given the opportunity to work in a real WWF ring prior to the start of the show, his mentor informed Mario that he would be having his first match that night against Greg Valentine. At the time Mancini still believed that professional wrestling was a sport, and had to be smartened up prior to his first match.

=== World Wrestling Federation (1984–1992) ===
Mario would debut that night against Greg Valentine on the taping for WWF Championship Wrestling, turning professional only six weeks after his 18th birthday, making him the youngest wrestler in the WWF at the time. In his second match he faced "Dr. D.' Dave Schultz at a house show in West Warwick, RI on August 13, 1984; during that encounter, Mario had his nose broken in two places. Mancini would later say that the early injury did him a favor, as the young wrestler would then avoid the hazing that others had to endure at the time. Having signed a contract at the Poughkeepsie taping, Mancini began to be used on a regular basis by the World Wrestling Federation. He appeared on successive episodes of WWF All Star Wrestling in October 1984, facing The Moondogs, Kamala, and a young Brutus Beefcake. Having lost his first five professional matches, the young wrestler gained the first victory of his career when he defeated real-life trainer Tony Altomare by disqualification at a house show in Middletown, CT on September 26, 1984. On October 28, 1984, he faced Steve Lombardi at house show in Reading, PA, with the two young wrestlers competing to a draw. On November 19, 1984, at another taping of All-Star Wrestling, Dave Schultz took to the microphone to publicly apologize to Mancini for breaking his nose. After shaking Mario's hand, Schultz then slapped him across the face. Mancini would finish the year competing against Paul Orndorff, Brutus Beefcake, Johnny Rodz, and Ken Patera. On December 5, he gained the second victory of his young career when he teamed with Swede Hanson to defeat Johnny Rodz and AJ Petruzzi at a house show in Bronx, NY.

Mancini would begin 1985 with a televised pinfall loss to Don Muraco on an All Star Wrestling taping in Hamilton, Ontario. Following several additional losses to various talents at house shows and on television, he was memorably squashed by King Kong Bundy in a warmup match prior to the latter's main event program at WrestleMania 2. Mancini rebounded to gain another victory, this time teaming with fellow rookie wrestler Paul Roma to defeat Gino Carabello & Pete Pompeii on March 6, 1985, in Stratford, CT. Behind the scenes Roma and Mancini would become traveling companions and form a strong friendship as they progressed within the industry. On March 21 the two wrestled each other in a babyface vs babyface match at a house show in Enfield, CT, ending in a draw. On May 4, 1985, Mario gained another draw, this time facing Prince of Pain.

"I have an attitude and my attitude is I am young and no matter how much punishment I take I am going to be there and I am always going to be there."

— Mario Mancini on May 2, 1985 to Vince McMahon on Tuesday Night Titans

On May 2, 1985, he was invited to be a guest on an episode of Tuesday Night Titans where the WWF celebrated their "unsung heroes". Appearing with Paul Roma, Jim Powers, Steve Lombardi, and "The Duke Of Dorchester" Pete Doherty, host Vince McMahon interviewed the undercard wrestlers on their motivations and plans. Mancini discussed his background, including being the youngest wrestler on the roster and beginning his career at 18. McMahon jokingly acknowledged that Mario was no relation to Boom Boom Mancini. Sixteen days later Mancini would face Dougherty at a show in Boston, MA and be defeated. In the summer and fall of 1985 he would compete against a host of wrestlers, including Terry Funk, King Kong Bundy, and Randy Savage, as well as teaming semi-regularly with Paul Roma. Mario rebounded to gain his first pinfall victory of his career, pinning Gino Carabello on November 9, 1985, at a house show in New Haven, CT.

Mancini entered 1986 now entrenched as one of the WWF's most visible jobbers. He began the year with televised losses on WWF Championship Wrestling to The Hart Foundation, Adrian Adonis, and Hercules Hernandez. On the June 21, 1986 edition of WWF All Star Wrestling he teamed with Scott McGhee and lost to Jimmy Jack Funk and Dory Funk; after the match he was hogtied by the Funks. Mario also sustained losses to Rene Goulet, Iron Mike Sharpe and Terry Gibbs on the house show tour. His losing streak continued as he lost a variety of televised and untelevised matches to Harley Race, The Hart Foundation, Hercules, Butch Reed, and Dino Bravo. On the December 14, 1986 edition of Wrestling Challenge he faced WWF Intercontinental Champion Randy Savage, but was defeated. The streak was finally ended on December 14, 1986, when he wrestled Jerry Allen to a draw at an event in Milwaukee, WI.

1987 opened with Mario Mancini facing Butch Reed on the January 18th episode of Wrestling Challenge. Before the match Andre the Giant was introduced to the crowd; only weeks before his heel turn, Andre would shake the hands of Mancini and the ring announcer. A day earlier Mancini teamed with Salvatore Bellomo to face the new team of Demolition on WWF Superstars. The match was also notable as this was the original version of the team, with Randy Colley playing the role of Smash. On the Feb 14th edition of Superstars, Mancini would team with Sivi Afi to face the updated version of Demolition as Barry Darsow replaced Colley in the role of Smash. On the March 22, 1987 edition of Wrestling Challenge he faced King Kong Bundy in another rematch; Mancini would be stretchered out after the match. He returned on April 24 to team with Sivi Afi and Lanny Poffo to face The Iron Sheik and Nikolai Volkoff, and Butch Reed in an unsuccessful effort. The losing streak extended as Mancini would fall to The One Man Gang, Outback Jack, The Heenan Family, The Islanders, The Young Stallions and Ron Bass during the remainder of the year. Mancini entered 1988 feeling disillusioned behind the scenes with his trajectory within the company. He altered his training regimen and also decided that if he was going to be a jobber, "I was going down in history as the best jobber the WWF had ever seen". Training outside the WWF in powerlifting, Mancini altered his physique. However his appearances began to become less frequent, as he only competed eleven times. On the November 13, 1988 edition of Prime Time Wrestling he faced Ted DiBiase for what would be the first of several encounters with "The Million Dollar Man". Before the match DiBiase attempted to pay off Mario, but Mancini then grabbed the money and tried to flee. He was caught between Virgil and DiBiase, forced back to the ring, and then defeated.

Mancini opened 1989 with a televised defeat at the hands of the newly christened "Brooklyn Brawler" (Steve Lombardi) on the February 15th edition of WWF Superstars. On July 17, 1989, he faced Ted Dibiase again on WWF Superstars, again falling via submission. The day after WrestleMania VI he wrestled twice on the Wrestling Challenge taping in Syracuse NY, facing Rick Martel and Mr Perfect. On the April 14, 1990 edition of WWF Superstars he wrestled Ted DiBiase once more, and for a third time lost via submission. Then on August 7, 1990, he lost to Dibiase for a fourth time on WWF Superstars. On the December 10, 1990 edition of Prime Time he wrestled Buddy Rose and succeeded in bodyslamming his 317 lb opponent.

Much like Steve Lombardi, Mancini participated in the debuts of several individual performers and tag-teams in the past, including Randy Savage, King Kong Bundy, Ted Arcidi, One Man Gang, Hercules Hernandez, the original and final versions of Demolition and The Hart Foundation. None however was more notable than his match on November 19, 1990, in Rochester NY. There he was the veteran hand in the very first match of the newly arrived Undertaker (called "Kane the Undertaker" that night). Mancini would be pinned in a match that aired after Undertaker's WWF debut at the 1990 Survivor Series.

Mancini competed in a pre-approved match outside of the WWF on May 3, 1985, where he faced and defeated Vance Verron on a Trans World Wrestling Federation event in Newington, CT. Back on WWF television, Mario would also compete against Skinner on the latter's WWF debut on July 29, 1991, on WWF Superstars. On August 24, 1991, he faced DiBiase for a fifth time, this time falling to the Million Dollar Man on Prime Time Wrestling. Mancini was the opponent for Big Bully Busick's debut on the August 25th episode of Wrestling Challenge. He closed the year teaming with Paul Perez to face The Nasty Boys on WWF Superstars on December 7, 1991. This would be his last amtch with the WWF as he left in April 1992 when he decided to leave the promotion, just shy of his 26th birthday.

=== Paradise Alley Pro Wrestling (2015–Present) ===
"But then Joe Bruin with the New England Pro Wrestling Hall of Fame called me and invited me to do a fan fest. I had no desire to do it. I didn’t think anyone would be interested in seeing me. Joe, though, informed me that I was in the WWE Encyclopedia, where I’m called one of the most resilient wrestlers in history. I had no idea about that until he told me about it. But I still didn’t want to go to the fan fest. I told him that if I sat there at a table for seven hours and only signed two autographs, I was going to feel completely mortified. He finally convinced me to go, telling me there was a guy flying in from Japan just to see me. I didn’t believe him, but when the event started, I got mobbed."

— Mario Mancini in interview to Mel Magazine

Mancini made his first appearance at a professional wrestling event in over two decades when at a fan event run by Joe Bruin in 2014. At first he was reluctant to make an appearance, but was informed that he was in the WWE Encyclopedia and was described as "one of the most resilient wrestlers in history". Klein eventually convinced Mancini to attend, and he was delighted by the response, including a fan who flew in from Japan just to meet him. He was later inducted by Howard Finkel into the New England Pro Wrestling Hall of Fame.

In 2015 Mario Mancini officially re-entered the industry alongside Paul Roma and founded Paradise Alley Pro Wrestling. The promotion served primarily as a training school, with a focus on "old school wrestling with a family friendly atmosphere". Roma and Mancini worked with David Paradise and Paul Perez to train a new generation of talent. Mario Mancini made his return to competition on September 12, 2015, at the debut event of the PAPW in East Haven, CT, defeating Richard Holliday. He then formed a tag-team with Big Steve called Olde Skool, and on March 12, 2016, they won the PAPW Tag-Team Championship by defeating Big Daddy Dre & Luis Andrews at The Thrill-O At Melillo in East Haven, CT. On April 30, 2016, the Battle Brothers (Anthony Battle & Chris Battle) beat Olde Skool to win the championship at the APW Retaliation event. Mancini faced Dustin Waller in a career ending match on November 13, 2021

== Championships and accomplishments ==
- Pro Wrestling Illustrated ranked him #419 of the 500 best singles wrestlers in the PWI 500 in 1991 and #431 in the PWI 500 in 1992.
- Mancini was inducted into The New England Pro Wrestling Hall Of Fame in 2014 along with Harley Race, Greg Valentine, Davey Boy Smith, Jim "The Anvil" Neidhart and Jose Luis Rivera.
