= Twin Towers (professional wrestling) =

Professional wrestling tag team

Tag team
- Members: Akeem; Big Boss Man; Slick (manager)
- Billed heights: Akeem: 6 ft 9 in (2.06 m); Boss Man: 6 ft 6 in (1.98 m)
- Combined billed weight: 780 lb (354 kg); Akeem: 450 lb (204 kg); Boss Man: 330 lb (150 kg)
- Debut: 1988
- Disbanded: 1990
- Years active: 1988–1990

The Twin Towers were a professional wrestling tag team in the World Wrestling Federation (WWF) from 1988 to 1990, consisting of Akeem and the Big Boss Man. They are best known for a main event feud with the Mega Powers.

== Origin ==
The Towers had before feuded with each other when the Big Boss Man was known as Big Bubba Rogers and Akeem was known as The One Man Gang in the Universal Wrestling Federation (UWF), when Rogers defeated Gang to win the UWF World Heavyweight Championship. This happened when Skandor Akbar who was managing Gang then deviously pitted Gang against Rogers who Akbar was also managing, for the UWF championship, Rogers then defeated Gang to win the title, and after Akbar then dumped Gang and continued to manage Rogers.

Shortly after losing the UWF championship, Gang left the UWF and joined the WWF. In late 1987 when Slick was managing the One Man Gang (who had recently become "The African Dream" Akeem) as well as Rogers who had joined the WWF as The Big Boss Man. Slick then paired up Akeem with the Boss Man and billed them as The Twin Towers. The Towers made their pay-per-view debut on November 24, 1988, at the WWF 1988 Survivor Series, captaining a team with Haku, Ted DiBiase, and The Red Rooster against a team captained by The Mega Powers (Hulk Hogan and Randy Savage), Hercules, Koko B. Ware and Hillbilly Jim in a five-on-five elimination match. Hogan and Savage survived a beating from both Towers.

== Mega Powers feud ==
While still teaming as the Towers, Boss Man and Akeem had many single matches against Hogan and Savage. On the January 9, 1989 episode of WWF Superstars of Wrestling, WWF World Heavyweight Champion Savage had a match against Akeem. When Savage delivered his diving elbow drop to Akeem and went to pin him, Boss Man then came and entered the ring and attacked Savage with his nightstick, and Akeem was disqualified. Hogan then ran down and attacked the Towers who then left the ring. On January 7, 1989 When Hogan faced Akeem on Saturday Night's Main Event XIX, Boss Man again interfered in the match, and then Elizabeth who was the manager of the Mega Powers came to help Hogan, who was then followed by Savage, who then cleared the ring of the Towers.

Also in January, the Towers scored several wins over The Young Stallions (Paul Roma and Jim Powers). On February 3's The Main Event II, they had a match against the Mega Powers, who were having dissension between them. During the match, Akeem threw Savage out of the ring and who then landed on top of Savage's manager Elizabeth, knocking her unconscious. When Hogan saw what happened, he left the match and carried Elizabeth from the ring to the medical area. When he returned to the ring, he wanted to tag Savage, but Savage, who was furious with being abandoned during the match and very angry that he had to face the Towers alone, then slapped Hogan in the face, and then left Hogan the face the Towers by himself. Hogan then defeated the Towers by himself and the Mega Powers won the match.

Two months later at WrestleMania V, the Towers defeated The Rockers (Shawn Michaels and Marty Jannetty) after Akeem pinned Michaels following a powerbomb by the Boss Man and Akeem's Air Africa finisher. The Towers appeared on a 1989 WWF VHS Coliseum Home Video cassette called WWF Fan Favorites where they wrestled and defeated The Hart Foundation (Bret Hart and Jim Neidhart) by countout. Though the Towers were still wrestling as a team, Boss Man pursued the WWF world championship and wrestled a major singles match, when he received a title shot against the new WWF champion Hulk Hogan after Hogan regained the WWF World Title from Savage at WrestleMania V, after the Mega Powers disbanded.

On Saturday Night's Main Event XXI, Hogan superplexed Boss Man from a steel cage, which he then left to win the match and resolve the feud.

== Title pursuit and further work ==
The Towers next feuded with the WWF Tag Team Champions Demolition (Ax and Smash) over the title. They lost every house show match they had to Demolition, by pinfall or disqualification. After Demolition lost the title to The Brain Busters (Arn Anderson and Tully Blanchard), they continued to feud with the Towers, who teamed with André the Giant who would lose to them and King Duggan at SummerSlam 1989, much to the surprise of commentator Jesse Ventura who had previously claimed that there was no way that he thought that Duggan and Demolition would beat the Towers and André. Ventura complained that Duggan should have been suspended as he helped Smash score the pin on Akeem after hitting Akeem with his 2x4. During this time, the Towers and Slick appeared on The Arsenio Hall Show.

At the 1989 Survivor Series The Towers were to team with The Honky Tonk Man and Rick Martel as a team called The Enforcers against a team called the Dream Team consisting of Dusty Rhodes, Brutus Beefcake, Tito Santana, and the Red Rooster, but the Boss Man's partner Akeem, but was replaced at the last moment by Bad News Brown. The Enforcers lost the match when Rhodes pinned Boss Man.

During this time, the Boss Man was embroiled in a feud with Dusty Rhodes, who had stolen his nightstick and handcuffs. After failing to exact justice, he became a face when "The Million Dollar Man" Ted DiBiase paid Slick to have him recover the Million Dollar Championship belt from Jake "The Snake" Roberts, who had stolen it. On a February 24, 1990 episode of WWF Superstars of Wrestling, Boss Man retrieved a bag containing the belt and Roberts' python, Damien. On The Brother Love Show, he refused to accept DiBiase's money for the bag, and returned it to Roberts. After that the Towers disbanded.

== Breakup and aftermath ==
=== Big Boss Man ===
After the Towers disbanded they once again feuded. Boss Man defeated Akeem at WrestleMania VI in only 1:49 despite DiBiase (who had wrestled the previous match against Jake Roberts) jumping him before the opening bell. He beat Akeem again on April 28, Saturday Night's Main Event XXVI, by disqualification. He then joined forces with former foe Hogan, primarily against Earthquake, Jimmy Hart and Dino Bravo at SummerSlam 1990 and the 1990 Survivor Series. He left the company in March 1993 and went to All Japan Pro Wrestling.

Boss Man later resurfaced in World Championship Wrestling (WCW) in December 1993 as The Boss before being rebranded as The Guardian Angel. He subsequently turned heel and became Big Bubba Rogers again, later shortened to Big Bubba. Under his real name, he mostly lost. He returned to the WWF from September 1998 to 2003. He died on September 22, 2004, from a heart attack at 41 years old.

=== Akeem ===
After losing his feud with his former partner, Akeem dropped back down to mid-card status, and left the WWF in October 1990 and reverted to the One Man Gang. He wrestled in WCW in 1991, where he feuded with El Gigante. He later returned to WCW in 1995 and won the United States championship. Also wrestled for Extreme Championship Wrestling from 1998 to 1999. Suffered a heart attack in 2000 and lost a significant amount of weight. He wrestled in the Gimmick Battle Royal at WrestleMania X-Seven as One Man Gang. He retired from wrestling in 2009.

== Reunion ==
Gang and Bubba were both recruited to the WCW heel stable The Dungeon of Doom in early 1996.
