= WWE sex scandal =

WWE sex scandal may refer to:

- Ring boy scandal, a 1992 scandal involving alleged abuse of teenaged ring boys
- Speaking Out movement, a social media movement against sexual abuse in professional wrestling
- Vince McMahon sexual misconduct allegations, overview of sexual misconduct allegations against promoter Vince McMahon
- Vince McMahon sex trafficking scandal, a 2024 scandal involving sexual abuse allegations against promoter Vince McMahon
