= Vince McMahon sexual misconduct allegations =

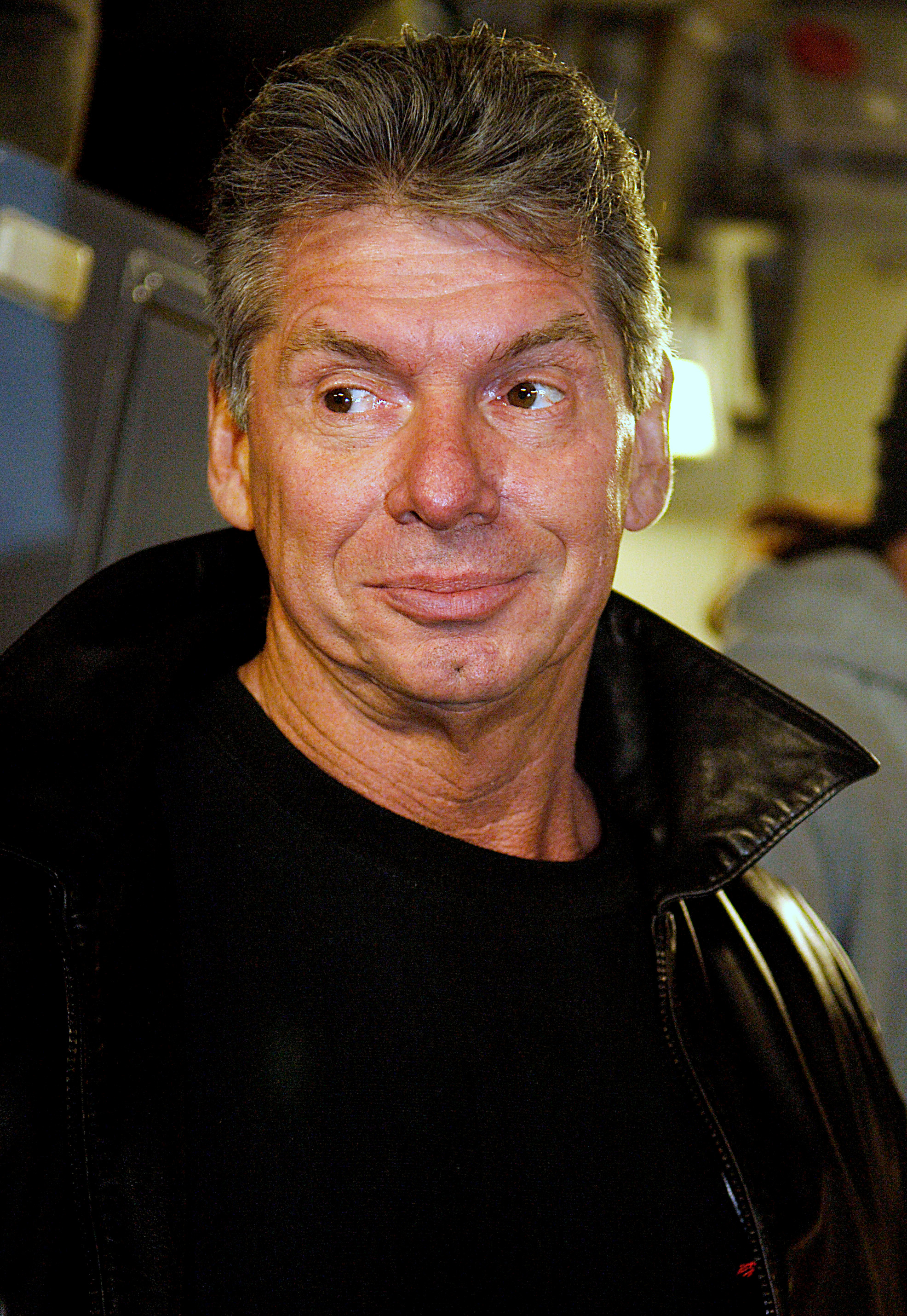
Vince McMahon in 2006

Vince McMahon, former promoter of the professional wrestling company WWE, has faced numerous allegations of sexual misconduct since 1992, including accusations of rape, sexual assault, sexual harassment, and sex trafficking. The allegations span multiple decades and involve former WWE employees and other individuals, resulting in civil lawsuits, nondisclosure agreements, and federal inquiries. In 2022, reports by The Wall Street Journal regarding undisclosed settlement payments contributed to his retirement as chairman and CEO before his return in early 2023. An internal investigation found $14.6 million in unrecorded payments made to settle sexual misconduct claims between 2006 and 2022. In January 2024, former WWE employee Janel Grant filed a lawsuit alleging that McMahon had sexually trafficked and repeatedly sexually assaulted her, leading to his resignation from WWE's parent company, TKO Group Holdings. The allegations have also resulted in a federal investigation, and McMahon was fined by the United States Securities and Exchange Commission in 2025 over his failure to disclose settlement payments.

== History ==
=== Rita Chatterton ===
On April 3, 1992, Rita Chatterton, a former referee noted for her stint as Rita Marie in the WWF in the 1980s and for being the first female referee in the WWF (and possibly the first in professional wrestling history), made an appearance on Geraldo Rivera's show Now It Can Be Told. She alleged that on July 16, 1986, McMahon tried to force her to perform oral sex on him in his limousine; when she refused, he raped her. Former wrestler Leonard Inzitari corroborated Chatterton's allegation in a 2022 interview in New York Magazine.

Chatterton filed a sexual abuse lawsuit against McMahon in December 2022. McMahon settled the lawsuit involving Chatterton that month, with his attorney stating that he maintains his innocence, but settled to "avoid the cost of litigation". People familiar with the matter reported that McMahon agreed to a multimillion-dollar settlement with Chatterton. Though the exact sum of the settlement payment was not publicly disclosed, it has been acknowledged Chatterton sought $11.75 million in damages in her lawsuit.

=== Kevin Patrick Wacholz ===
In 1992, wrestler Kevin Patrick Wacholz, better known by his ring name Nailz, filed a lawsuit which alleged McMahon sexually assaulted him. The same year, McMahon filed a counter-lawsuit against Nailz.

=== 2006 and 2011 tanning bar incidents ===
McMahon was accused of sexual harassment by a worker at a tanning bar in Boca Raton, Florida, on February 1, 2006. McMahon was accused of showing nude photos of himself to her as well as groping and attempting to kiss the worker. At first, the charge appeared to be discredited because McMahon was in Miami for the 2006 Royal Rumble at the time. It was soon clarified that the alleged incident was reported to police on the day of the Rumble, but actually took place the day before. On March 25, it was reported that no charges would be filed against McMahon as a result of the investigation.

A separate tanning spa worker, who alleged that McMahon sexually assaulted her in California in 2011, filed a lawsuit against McMahon in December 2022.

=== Hush-money settlements and nondisclosure agreements ===
The WWE board, which McMahon controlled, began investigating a $3 million hush-money settlement that McMahon paid over an alleged affair with a former employee of the company in April 2022. The investigation also revealed other nondisclosure agreements related to misconduct claims by other women in the company against McMahon and executive John Laurinaitis, totaling $12 million. By October 2022, the WWE had disclosed $19.6 million in unrecorded payments McMahon made to settle sexual misconduct claims between 2006 and 2022.

In June 2022, McMahon stepped down as CEO and chairman of WWE, but continued to oversee content development. He later announced his retirement on July 22, 2022, only to return six months later. In January 2024, after reports on the sexual assault accusations by Janel Grant, McMahon resigned again, resigning from WWE parent company TKO.

On January 10, 2025, it was announced that McMahon was fined over $1.7 million by the Securities and Exchange Commission from undisclosed hush money payments, dated back from 2019 to 2022, handed out to two women while he was with the WWE.

=== Janel Grant ===
In January 2024, a lawsuit was filed by Janel Grant, a former employee at WWE global headquarters between 2019 and 2022. Grant alleged that McMahon had coerced her into a sexual relationship and, along with the WWE executive John Laurinaitis and a WWE wrestler who was also a former UFC fighter, (Note: The WWE/UFC talent in question was not named in the lawsuit, but was identified by The Wall Street Journal as Brock Lesnar.) sexually trafficked her, and repeatedly sexually assaulted her during 2020–2021. Grant alleged that she was subjected to "extreme cruelty and degradation" by McMahon, including being defecated upon during a sexual encounter. Grant stated that McMahon had agreed to pay her $3 million in 2022 in return for a NDA, but stopped paying after only $1 million had been paid following the initial public emergence of the sexual misconduct allegations the same year. One day after the report of the claims, on January 26, Deadline confirmed that McMahon had resigned from TKO. In a statement, McMahon denied the allegations, and said the decision was made "out of respect for the WWE Universe, TKO, shareholders, and business partners". On May 30, Grant agreed to "stay her case" against McMahon for six months at the request of the Department of Justice, who were launching an investigation into the McMahon allegations.

In June 2026, Grant, McMahon, and WWE jointly moved to take the sex trafficking lawsuit out of public and into private arbitration. In July 2026, Grant's case against McMahon and WWE was voluntarily dismissed, pending a judge's approval.

=== John Laurinaitis ===
On February 1, 2024, John Laurinaitis, former WWE executive and a co-defendant in the Janel Grant sex trafficking suit, released a statement through his attorney that accused McMahon of sexual misconduct. Laurinaitis, through his attorney, accused McMahon of holding "power" and "control" over him and of making "dictatorial sexual demands with repercussions if not met".

=== Federal sexual assault and trafficking investigation ===
On February 2, 2024, The Wall Street Journal reported that federal authorities in New York had launched an investigation into sexual assault and sex trafficking allegations made against McMahon. Federal agents had previously executed a search warrant for McMahon's phone and delivered a subpoena to him for documents related to any allegation of "rape, sex trafficking, sexual assault, commercial sex transaction, harassment or discrimination" against current or former WWE employees. The individuals named in the grand jury subpoena included a WWE contractor who was allegedly sent unsolicited nude photos and sexually harassed by McMahon, a former WWE wrestler who said McMahon coerced her into giving him oral sex, former WWF referee Rita Chatterton, who McMahon reportedly reached a multimillion-dollar settlement with after an allegation of sexual assault, a spa manager who said McMahon assaulted her at a Southern California resort, and a former WWE employee who alleged the head of talent relations at the company at the time, John Laurinaitis, demoted her after she ended a sexual relationship with him.
