= Mega Powers =

Professional wrestling tag team

- Left to right: Randy Savage, Miss Elizabeth, and Hulk Hogan

Tag team
- Name(s): Mega Powers; Monster Maniacs
- Members: Randy Savage; Hulk Hogan; Miss Elizabeth (manager); Jimmy Hart (manager)
- Billed heights: Hogan: 6 ft 8 in (2.03 m); Savage: 6 ft 2 in (1.88 m)
- Combined billed weight: 539 lb (244 kg)
- Billed from: Hogan: Venice Beach, California; Savage: Sarasota, Florida
- Debut: October 3, 1987
- Disbanded: February 3, 1989
- Years active: 1987–1989, 1994–1996, 1997–1998

The Mega Powers were a tag team in the World Wrestling Federation (WWF) from 1987 to 1989, consisting of Hulk Hogan and Randy Savage, and managed by Savage's wife, Miss Elizabeth. Lust and jealousy surrounding her led to the team's demise and subsequent feud, culminating in a match at WrestleMania V. They briefly reformed in World Championship Wrestling (WCW) in 1994 as the Monster Maniacs before returning to their original name. They then interacted regularly thereafter as both teammates and rivals, particularly as members of the New World Order (nWo), until their departures from WCW in 2000.

== History ==
=== World Wrestling Federation (1987–1993) ===
==== Formation (1987) ====
Prior to the fall of 1987, Hogan and Savage were bitter enemies. In fact, from late 1985 through mid-summer 1987, the two often wrestled for the WWF World Heavyweight Championship. Hogan was able to defeat Savage on many of these occasions, although Savage gained some important countout and disqualification victories over Hogan as well. Although Hogan was the most popular star in the WWF during most of this time, Savage—who was the WWF Intercontinental Heavyweight Champion for many of their matches in 1986 and early 1987—had gained a strong following even during his heel days, and by July 1987, was starting to get more cheers than boos. A slow face turn for Savage was beginning, and gained credibility when an angle was started involving The Honky Tonk Man (a heel who had since won the Intercontinental Championship) began making disparaging comments about Savage. To aid Savage's face turn, the WWF began booking him against various heels, including King Kong Bundy and Killer Khan, with those matches taking place prior to his first match against Honky.

The Mega Powers officially formed their alliance, then, on the October 3, 1987 Saturday Night's Main Event XII (taped September 23, 1987), when Savage sought to win the Intercontinental Championship from Honky Tonk Man. When Savage hit his diving elbow drop finisher on Honky for the pin, The Hart Foundation came in and attacked Savage, getting Honky disqualified.

When Honky shoved Miss Elizabeth to the mat, who was trying to stop them, she ran away to the backstage area; meanwhile, Honky completed his attempt to break his guitar over Savage's head. Shortly afterward, Miss Elizabeth returned with Savage's former rival Hulk Hogan, who came and saved Savage from the assault. Afterwards, Savage extended his hand in friendship to Hogan, who accepted and the three paraded around the ring with their hands adjoined. Their alliance solidified Savage's change into a fan favorite, which had been brewing for weeks as fan support grew for him. Later that night, during a backstage interview with Gene Okerlund, Savage and Hogan shook hands again and Savage referred to themselves for the first time as the Mega Powers. Hogan stated that "the combination of 'Hulkamania' and 'Macho Madness' may become the most powerful force in WWF history".

Over the next four months, Hogan and Savage teamed up several time, the first at a house show in Vancouver, BC, on November 10, 1987. It was a six-man tag team match with Hogan and Savage teaming with Jim Duggan to defeat King Kong Bundy, Rick Rude, and Harley Race. Their second tag team match was in Huntsville, Alabama on January 5, 1988. It was a dark match at a television taping where Hogan and Savage defeated the team of Honky Tonk Man and the Hart Foundation in a handicap match. Another six-man tag team match was held in Montreal on February 8, 1988, with Hogan and Savage teaming up with Ricky Steamboat to defeat the Honky Tonk Man and the Hart Foundation.

On the March 12, 1988 episode of Saturday Night's Main Event XV, Savage wrestled Ted DiBiase in a singles match. DiBiase was accompanied by Virgil and André The Giant. Halfway through the match the referee ejected Virgil from ringside for outside interference. The match ended when Andre took advantage of the referee being incapacitated and rammed Savage into the ringpost. When the referee came to he counted Savage out of the ring. Following the match, Virgil returned to the ring and joined DiBiase and Andre in a 3-on-1 beating of Savage. Miss Elizabeth ran away from ringside and when she returned she was with Hulk Hogan, who ran into the ring carrying a steel chair. Hogan saved Savage from any further attacks by chasing the trio out of the ring. Afterwards, Hogan helped Savage back to his feet.

==== WrestleMania IV (1988) ====
A tournament was made to decide a new WWF World Heavyweight Champion after Hogan "lost" the title to André the Giant at The Main Event I on February 5, 1988. André immediately surrendered the belt to Ted DiBiase. It was revealed that DiBiase had hired referee Dave Hebner's twin brother, Earl, to pretend to be Dave and give Hogan a bogus three count when Hulk's shoulder was clearly off the mat before the count of three. Between the referee cheating Hogan, André forfeiting the title and DiBiase's illegal attempt to buy the title, this caused WWF President Jack Tunney to declare the championship vacant.

Hogan and André were both given byes in the first round of the tournament, but fought to a double-disqualification in the quarterfinals. This had the side effect of giving Ted DiBiase a bye in the semifinals. Ultimately, Savage and DiBiase met in the final match of the tournament. DiBiase did all that he could to take out Savage (including the constant interference of André, who was acting as DiBiase's second for this match), but he couldn't keep him down. Savage eventually went to Miss Elizabeth, whispering something to her. She ran backstage, as the fans were trying to figure out what was going on.

A few minutes later, Miss Elizabeth re-emerged with Hogan. André and DiBiase seemed shocked by the turn of events. Hogan got revenge on DiBiase by hitting him in the back with a steel chair while André had distracted the referee by preventing Savage from getting to the ropes while locked in DiBiase's Million Dollar Dream. Savage was able to hit his diving elbow drop finisher and got the three count. After the match, they celebrated as a group.

A few months later, with Hogan on leave of absence from the WWF and Savage feuding with DiBiase over the title, DiBiase and André attacked Savage during an interview segment prompting Savage to challenge the two to a tag team match against him and a partner of his choosing, which was accepted. Savage then revealed that his partner would be the returning Hogan and that they would meet André and DiBiase at SummerSlam.

==== SummerSlam (1988) ====
Their official televised debut match as a tag team was at SummerSlam '88. They went against André the Giant and Ted DiBiase in a match billed as "The Mega Powers versus the Mega Bucks". Jesse Ventura, a longtime supporter of Savage's but a longtime adversary of Hogan's, served as referee for this match. The match didn't go as planned for the Mega Bucks. Miss Elizabeth exposed her assets in skimpy panties after stripping off her skirt to the heels, resulting in the Mega Powers coming back to win the match. Ventura counted but hesitated at two, so Savage forced the three-count.

==== Feud with The Twin Towers and split (1988–1989) ====
At the 1988 Survivor Series, Hogan and Savage captained a team that faced a five-member squad headed by Big Boss Man and Akeem (who by now were being billed as The Twin Towers). Hogan and Savage eventually won the match (last eliminating King Haku, Big Boss Man and Akeem had been counted out and disqualified, respectively); during the post-match posing, Hogan again began acting friendly toward Miss Elizabeth, visibly annoying Savage. In a post-match interview, pro-heel commentator Jesse Ventura interviewed Savage, playing up Savage's growing anger regarding Hogan's behavior toward Miss Elizabeth. However, Miss Elizabeth was not the only reason Hogan and Savage had issues with each other during their stint as a team.

The two had an uneasy relationship, particularly when it became obvious Hogan would act friendly and/or protective toward Miss Elizabeth. On Saturday Night's Main Event XVII and XX, Hogan was insistent on Miss Elizabeth appearing at ringside for his matches versus King Haku, Akeem, and Bad News Brown. In the latter instance, Miss Elizabeth's was endangered by Akeem and his allies, Slick and King Haku when Big Boss Man grabbed Miss Elizabeth and placed her in handcuffs; before Big Boss Man could use his nightstick to strike Miss Elizabeth, Savage ran out and made the save. While Savage showed concern for Miss Elizabeth, he disregarded Hogan, who was still reeling from being attacked by The Big Boss Man and Akeem.

At the 1989 Royal Rumble, Hogan accidentally eliminated Savage in the Royal Rumble match when he went to put out Bad News Brown (with whom Savage was having a concurrent feud). The two appeared to make amends at the behest of their manager, but Savage was clearly upset after the event (which was ultimately won by Big John Studd).

Things came to a full boil on February 3, 1989, on NBC's prime-time special, The Main Event II when the two wrestled The Twin Towers. During the match, Akeem threw Savage out of the ring. Savage was thrown onto Miss Elizabeth, knocking her unconscious. Hogan saw what happened and carried Miss Elizabeth from the ring to the medical area. When Miss Elizabeth was revived, she implored a distraught Hogan to return to the ring to help Savage, who had been left to fight the two gargantuans on his own for several minutes. Hogan eventually called for the tag, but Savage, who was furious with being abandoned during the match, slapped Hogan in the face. After some choice words to a confused Hogan, he took his world championship belt, and stormed back to the locker room. Hogan defeated The Twin Towers by himself. After the match, Hogan went to check on Miss Elizabeth. Savage was back there too, who was caught in mid-tirade yelling to Miss Elizabeth that as world champion he was tired of taking a backseat to both Hogan and Miss Elizabeth in the Mega Powers pecking order. Upon Hogan's arrival, Savage turned his frustration to him, accused Hogan of trying to steal Miss Elizabeth from him, and manipulate the belt away from him. Hogan implored Miss Elizabeth to try and talk some sense into him before Savage attacked him by hitting him in the face with the title belt, sealing the end to their partnership and beginning their feud.

==== WrestleMania V: The Mega Powers explode (1989) ====
Hogan's first response to Savage's actions was to challenge him at WrestleMania for the WWF World Heavyweight Championship, which Savage eventually accepted. Most of the leadup to the match involved two things: the first being Savage showing (heavily edited and out of context) footage to prove that Hogan "lusted after" Miss Elizabeth, after which Hogan would respond by showing the footage in its proper context and with explanation; and the question of whose corner would Miss Elizabeth be in. Miss Elizabeth ultimately announced she would be in a neutral corner.

On April 2, 1989, Hogan and Savage decided to settle the score at WrestleMania V for the WWF World Heavyweight Championship. Although Miss Elizabeth was stationed in her "neutral corner" for the match, she was eventually ejected from ringside after too many complications were caused by her attempting to assist both men at different points in the match. After an even match between both, Hogan eventually prevailed after kicking out of a Savage's diving elbow drop before "hulking up" and executing the leg drop to become WWF World Heavyweight Champion for the second time.

The two would continue their feud in the months following WrestleMania. Savage replaced Miss Elizabeth as his manager with Sensational Sherri after Wrestlemania V and aligned himself with Hogan's co-star from the movie No Holds Barred, Tiny Lister (who appeared in character as Zeus, his role in the film). This extension of the angle would culminate at SummerSlam when Hogan and Brutus Beefcake (with a return appearance by Miss Elizabeth) would defeat Savage and Zeus in the main event, and a December 1989 cage match between the two teams during a pay-per-view event entitled No Holds Barred: The Match, The Movie.

==== Post-feud (1990–1993) ====
Savage and Hogan would meet one last time for a WrestleMania V rematch on the February 23, 1990 edition The Main Event III with Heavyweight Boxing Champion James "Buster" Douglas as the guest referee. Hogan would come out victorious yet again with Savage knocked out by Douglas post-match.

After his feud with Hogan came to a final conclusion, Savage began a rivalry with Ultimate Warrior and cost him his WWF Championship against Sgt. Slaughter at the Royal Rumble in January 1991. Savage and Warrior would face off in a retirement match at WrestleMania VII, which Savage lost. After the match Queen Sherri turned on him, which caused Miss Elizabeth to come from the crowd and save Savage. The actions turned Savage into a hero again, and he left the ring with Miss Elizabeth to a loud ovation from the crowd. Following Hogan's victory over Sgt. Slaughter to regain the WWF Championship at that same event, Savage served as a special guest referee for house show rematches between Hogan and Slaughter from June 30 through August 18. In each of the seven bouts, Hogan successfully retained the title after Slaughter attacked Savage only for Savage to return the favor, thereby assisting Hogan.

On November 16, 1991, Hogan was a guest on Paul Bearer's Funeral Parlor interview segment. When Hogan was attacked by The Undertaker and Ric Flair, Savage (along with Roddy Piper) saved Hogan from the beating.

Savage returned to wrestling in 1992, and he and Hogan both competed in the 1992 Royal Rumble. The two tagged to defeat Jake "The Snake" Roberts and The Berzerker on a February 1 taping of WWF Superstars. They teamed again at a house show on February 10 to defeat Roberts and The Undertaker. The Mega Powers reunited for one final time in the WWF on March 29, 1992, to defeat Ric Flair and Sid Justice by disqualification at a house show at The Palace of Auburn Hills in Auburn, Michigan.

Hogan and Savage's real-life friendship unraveled in 1992 when Miss Elizabeth filed for divorce against Savage. In an interview with Radio WWF in 1993, Savage discussed the divorce, openly blaming Hogan and his then-wife Linda for turning Miss Elizabeth against him.

An urban legend was that Savage gave Hogan a black eye with a punch a few days before WrestleMania IX in 1993; however, Hogan stated in his autobiography the black eye came from a jet ski accident incurred days before the event. This was later confirmed in an interview with Mike Schiavello.

Hogan left the WWF in the summer of 1993, while Savage departed near the end of 1994.

=== World Championship Wrestling (1994–2000) ===
==== Reunion (1994–1996) ====
After Hogan and Savage patched up their real-life differences, Hogan talked WCW president Eric Bischoff into signing Savage, who was increasingly unhappy with his diminishing role in the WWF. In his initial appearance on WCW Saturday Night, Savage made reference on air to his love/hate relationship with Hogan and was ambiguous as to where his allegiance was. He aided Hogan at Starrcade 1994 and shook his hand, signalling their alliance. Jimmy Hart, who by this point was managing Hogan, began to manage the team. Initially called "The Monster Maniacs" (presumably for legal reasons), Hogan and Savage teamed on January 25, 1995, at Clash of the Champions XXX to battle Kevin Sullivan and The Butcher. Hart would turn on the team at Halloween Havoc 1995 to manage the Dungeon of Doom, a stable Sullivan would go on to form in the Summer of 1995 in an effort to improve his chances of ridding WCW of Hogan. By early 1996, Hogan and Savage would change their team name back to "The Mega Powers" and Miss Elizabeth returned to manage them, however at SuperBrawl VI, Elizabeth would turn on Hogan and Savage and align herself with Ric Flair. On March 24, 1996, at Uncensored, The Mega Powers reunited to take on eight opponents in a Doomsday Cage Match. The opponents were Flair, Arn Anderson, Kevin Sullivan, Lex Luger, The Faces of Fear (The Barbarian and Meng), Z-Gangsta, and The Ultimate Solution. They were known as the Alliance to End Hulkamania. At Clash of the Champions XXXII on January 23, 1996, from Las Vegas, Nevada, the duo lost to Ric Flair and The Giant.

==== Second breakup (1996) ====
The team broke up again at Bash at the Beach on July 7, 1996. This time, it was Hogan who turned heel. Hogan came out seemingly to save Savage and Sting during their match with The Outsiders (Scott Hall and Kevin Nash); Hogan double-crossed Savage and Sting, dropping the leg on Savage three times, then forming the New World Order (nWo). WCW decided to work Hogan's and Savage's old real life feud into the storyline, going as far as having Hogan state that if Savage was going to accuse him of causing his divorce from Miss Elizabeth, then he "doesn't need someone as ungrateful as 'The Macho Man' as a friend". Later that year, the former friends faced off at Halloween Havoc for the WCW World Heavyweight Championship. Savage almost had Hogan beat, but thanks to Ted DiBiase and The Giant, Hogan retained the title and the nWo brutally beat Savage. Savage's ex-wife, Miss Elizabeth, who was aligned with the Four Horsemen at the time, begged Hogan to stop hurting Savage, who she still cared deeply about. She then covered his unconscious body to prevent anymore beatings and was spraypainted along with Savage.

==== New World Order (1997–1998) ====
After losing to Hogan at Halloween Havoc, Savage went on hiatus. He returned to WCW in January 1997, joining Sting in the rafters, showing no alliance to either WCW or the nWo for a while. At SuperBrawl VII, Savage appeared ringside for the match between Hogan and Roddy Piper. Savage became a villain by slipping Hogan a pair of brass knuckles when the referee's back was turned. Hogan used the weapon en route to his very first pinfall victory over Piper, and after the match, Hogan and Savage brutalized Piper together.

The pair would team often, sometimes with the Outsiders, in tag matches with Savage now wearing similar wrestling attire to Hogan. However, in late 1997, after Hogan lost the WCW World Heavyweight Championship to Sting, friction popped up between Savage and Hogan again, this time over who the leader of the nWo was. Hogan and Savage teamed for the final time in their careers on the February 16, 1998 edition of WCW Monday Nitro, losing to Sting and Lex Luger by disqualification.

A brief feud between Savage and fellow nWo member Kevin Nash ended when the two realized Hogan was playing them against each other to keep them away from chasing the WCW World Heavyweight Championship. The feud came to a fever pitch when Savage took the title from Sting, only to have Hogan take it from him the next night. After that, the nWo split into two factions, with Hogan spearheading nWo Hollywood and Savage co-founding the nWo Wolfpac with Nash. The Outsiders split shortly after when Hall turned on Nash and joined up with nWo Hollywood.

The former Mega Powers teammates faced off for the last time when Savage lost the WCW World Heavyweight Championship to Hogan on the July 12, 1999 episode of Nitro.

==== The Millionaire's Club (2000) ====
In 2000, Hogan and other legends have formed the WCW faction known as The Millionaire's Club. During one memorable brawl at the end of a television taping between the club and their opponents, Savage suddenly ran out and lent the Club his aid, turning the tide and effectively becoming a member after tapping fists with Hogan once the fighting ended. Hogan and Savage had reverted to fan favorite status by this time. This ended quickly, however, as Hogan left from WCW in July 2000 (who returned to WWF (now WWE) in 2 years later), and Savage wasn't seen again before WCW closed down after the final episode of Monday Nitro on March 26, 2001.

== Parodies and deaths ==
=== TNA: Hogan and Jay Lethal (2010) ===
On the March 29, 2010 episode of Total Nonstop Action Wrestling (TNA)'s Impact! television show, Hogan met with "Black Machismo" Jay Lethal in his office. Lethal, whose character was inspired by Savage, made reference to the Mega Powers, placing himself in Savage's place as Hogan's partner. They finished the segment by doing the Mega Powers handshake.

=== WWE: AxelMania and Macho Mandow (2015) ===
On the May 5, 2015 episode of Main Event, Damien Sandow adopted a new "Macho Mandow" gimmick reminiscent of Savage's, with the same entrance music (Pomp and Circumstance) and similar attire. He then wrestled a match against Curtis Axel, whose "AxelMania" gimmick had elements similar to Hogan's; however, the match was interrupted by The Ascension. On the May 11, 2015 episode of Raw, they had a rematch and were again interrupted by The Ascension; this time they fought off The Ascension together, and then shared a handshake reminiscent of the original Mega Powers. The team was later christened "The Meta Powers". At Payback, The Meta Powers were defeated by The Ascension. The Meta Powers angle was dropped on July 24, 2015, after WWE fired Hulk Hogan and severed all ties with him, although Sandow continued to use the Macho Man gimmick.

=== Deaths ===
Miss Elizabeth died on May 3, 2003, due to Acute toxicity, Randy Savage died on May 20, 2011, from a heart attack due to an enlarged heart and heart disease complications, whereas Hulk Hogan died on July 24, 2025, due to heart attack.

== Championships and accomplishments ==
- Pro Wrestling Illustrated
  - Ranked No. 57 of the 100 best tag teams during the "PWI Years" in 2003
- World Championship Wrestling
  - WCW World Heavyweight Championship (3 times) – Hulk Hogan (1), Randy Savage (2)
- World Wrestling Federation
  - WWF World Heavyweight Championship (2 times) – Hulk Hogan (1), Randy Savage (1)

== See also ==
- New World Order
- The Millionaire's Club

== Notes ==
- Hulk Hogan (2002). Hollywood Hulk Hogan. Simon and Schuster. ISBN 0-7434-7556-9.
- Shields, Brian (2006). Main Event: WWE in the Raging 80s. Simon and Schuster. ISBN 1-4165-3257-9.
- Loverro, Thom (2006). The Rise & Fall of ECW: Extreme Championship Wrestling. Simon and Schuster. ISBN 1-4165-1058-3.
- Eric Bischoff (2006). Eric Bischoff: Controversy Creates Cash. Simon and Schuster. ISBN 1-4165-2729-X.
