= Brad Balukjian =

American writer and science professor

Brad Balukjian (born October 16, 1980) is an American writer and science professor. He is best known for his memoir The Wax Pack: On the Open Road in Search of Baseball's Afterlife.

== Background ==
Balukjian grew up in Greenville, Rhode Island. He went to college at Duke University, where he graduated in 2002, and got his PhD in Environmental Science, Policy and Management from UC, Berkeley.

He teaches natural history at Merritt College in Oakland, California, where he founded the Natural History & Sustainability program.

== Career ==
In 2015, Balukjian opened a pack of unopened baseball cards from 1986 and decided to track down all of the players inside. His journey became the memoir The Wax Pack (2020), which went on to become a Los Angeles Times bestseller.

Balukjian said his book was rejected by 38 publishers before the University of Nebraska Press offered him a contract.

Balukjian is a freelance writer for The Smithsonian, Alta Online, and other publications. His work includes a science piece about earwig penises for The Smithsonian and decoding the science of the stolen base.

Balukjian's second book, The Six Pack, explores the where are they now story of former WWE wrestlers.
