= Power and Glory =

Professional wrestling tag team

Tag team
- Members: Hercules; Paul Roma
- Billed heights: Hercules: 6 ft 1 in (1.85 m); Roma: 5 ft 11 in (1.80 m)
- Combined billed weight: 519 lb (235 kg; 37.1 st)
- Debut: July 1990
- Disbanded: October 1991
- Years active: 1990–1991

Power and Glory was a professional wrestling tag team in the World Wrestling Federation (WWF) from 1990 to 1991. The team consisted of Hercules (Power, strength) and Paul "Romeo" Roma (Glory, looks). The team was managed by Slick.

== History ==
In early 1990, Paul Roma had come off a breakup of The Young Stallions and was used as an "enhancement talent" for wrestlers getting a push. Roma was paired up with the Mighty Hercules into a regular tag team. At this point they were not given a name, nor did the two faces get much air time as a team, being relegated to a few matches against jobbers.

During the summer of 1990, Paul Roma faced Dino Bravo on WWF Superstars of Wrestling, losing after being hit with Jimmy Hart’s megaphone and then pinned. Due to the blow to the head Roma was still in the ring feeling groggy when The Rockers came out for their scheduled match. Roma got mad at the Rockers over coming out and was soon joined by Hercules as the two sides argued. Moments later, Roma and Hercules turned heel by attacking the Rockers, beating them down before leaving the ring together.

One of the matches the new team had was against the other newly formed team of Roma's former partner, Jim Powers and Hercules' former rival, Jim Brunzell, in which Roma and Hercules were victorious when Roma pinned Brunzell after hitting their finisher on Brunzell for the win. (Roma faced Powers numerous times at houses shows, with Roma in all the bouts coming as the winner)

Shortly after their attack on the Rockers, Roma and Hercules unveiled their new manager Slick (who briefly managed Hercules a few years prior), and a new name to go with their attitude - Power and Glory, along with matching outfits. Power and Glory clashed with the Rockers at SummerSlam 1990 with Marty Jannetty being forced to wrestle the match on his own after Power and Glory injured Shawn Michaels' knee before the match (this was a storyline excuse to give Michaels some time off to heal a previously suffered knee injury and he had a noticeable limp on his way to the ring for the SummerSlam match). Once Michaels returned, the feud continued, with the two teams being on opposite sides at Survivor Series, with Power and Glory once again coming out as the victors. Bobby Heenan while doing commentary would sometimes refer to Paul Roma as "Romeo Roma" while Gorilla Monsoon would sometimes refer to Power and Glory as "Herc and Jerk".

The feud culminated on December 28, at Madison Square Garden where both teams fought to a time limit draw. Despite having a number of shots at the WWF Tag Team Champions, The Hart Foundation, Roma and Hercules never won the gold. Their misfortune continued at WrestleMania VII where they lost to the Legion of Doom in 59 seconds.

Soon after, Power and Glory teamed up with Slick’s other charge, The Warlord, for a series of 6-man tag team matches that usually saw the team on the losing side. Their last pay-per-view outing came when they teamed with The Warlord to face Ricky Steamboat, Kerry Von Erich and Davey Boy Smith at SummerSlam 1991 in a losing effort. In one of their last recorded matches together as a team, they lost to the Legion of Doom at the Royal Albert Hall in England. Roma left the WWF soon after in October 1991 and later appeared as one of Four Horsemen in World Championship Wrestling (WCW), while Hercules would remain with the company until February 1992 before departing as well.

Hercules Hernandez died of heart disease on March 6, 2004.

== See also ==
- The Young Stallions
