= Johnny Rodz =

American professional wrestler (born 1938)

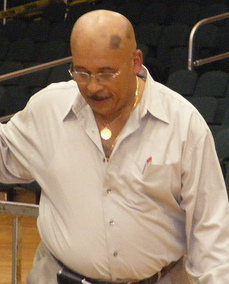
- Rodz, c. 2008

Personal information
- Born: John Rodriguez; May 16, 1938 (age 88) New York City, New York, U.S.

Professional wrestling career
- Ring name(s): Java Ruuk; Johnny Rodz; Super Medico II; El Shafto; Army Medic
- Billed height: 5 ft 8 in (173 cm)
- Billed weight: 239 lb (108 kg)
- Billed from: "The Bronx"
- Debut: 1965
- Retired: 1997

John Rodriguez (born May 16, 1938) is a retired professional wrestler, better known by the ring name Johnny Rodz, who worked for the World Wide Wrestling Federation in the 1960s to the 1980s.

== Professional wrestling career ==
=== World Wide Wrestling Federation / World Wrestling Federation (1965–1985) ===
He was part of the World Wide Wrestling Federation (WWWF) from its early years, appearing on WWWF cards as far back as 1965. He wrestled Bob Backlund in Madison Square Garden while working for the WWWF at the time. Dubbed the "Fire Brand From the Bronx" and the "Unpredictable", he was a proficient worker and a solid heel. Johnny would often tag with Jose Estrada, and Frank "the Gypsy" Rodriguez. For much of the next two decades through mid-1985, Rodz was a mainstay of the federation, though largely used as enhancement talent, for which he was praised by some of his peers. At times Rodz worked in Japan, Puerto Rico and other territories. This included him winning the Canadian International Heavyweight Championship in Montreal as Java Ruuk defeating Édouard Carpentier in 1980. On August 9, 1980, at the Showdown at Shea, he was defeated by "Polish Power" Ivan Putski. His last WWF match was a loss to Gama Singh on June 19, 1985.

=== NWA Hollywood Wrestling (1976–1978) ===
For a time, he also worked with Mike and Gene LeBell's NWA Hollywood Wrestling. He won a greater share of matches wrestling as "Arabian Wildman" Java Ruuk and even won the promotion's battle royal in 1976.

=== Puerto Rico (1981, 1983–1984) ===
Rodz made his debut in Puerto Rico for the World Wrestling Council in 1981 teaming with Jose Estrada Sr. as the Super Medicos. He won the WWC Caribbean Heavyweight Championship by defeating Angel Maravilla. He dropped the title to Tommy Gilbert.

In 1983, he returned with Estrada to Puerto Rico, where they feuded with the Invaders.

=== Later Career (1985–1997) ===
After leaving the WWF, Rodz would work in the independent circuit in New York. He returned to Puerto Rico in 1990 as the Super Medicos feuding with the Texas Hangmen.

Rodz defeated Chris Candido at Century Toyota in Wallingford, Connecticut on June 28, 1992. Later that year the Super Medicos worked in Japan for W*ING and Network Of Wrestling.

On May 15, 1996, Rodz defeated Johnny Valiant at Empire Wrestling Alliance in Hoboken, New Jersey.

In 1997, Rodz wrestled his last match and retired.

=== Post-retirement ===
In 1996, Rodz was inducted into the WWF Hall of Fame class of 1996 by Arnold Skaaland.

On the March 1, 2007 episode of Total Nonstop Action Wrestling's Impact showed the Latin American Xchange (LAX) attacking Rodz as part of their feud with Team 3D. Ten days later at Destination X, he accompanied Team 3D to the ring for their Ghettobrawl match with LAX at the pay-per-view.

== Training ==
Johnny Rodz has been training students for over 30 years, out of Gleason's Gym in Brooklyn. Rodz has trained many students who have gone on to have successful careers in and out of the ring for various wrestling promotions, serve as high-level executives at television networks, and some even went on to become high-level government officials at agencies such as FDA and FDIC. Wrestlers trained by Rodz include: Tazz, Tommy Dreamer, D-von Dudley, Damien Demento, Prince Nana, Marti Belle, Wendy Choo, Big Vito, Masha Slamovich, William Morrissey, Vince Russo, and many more. A few of Rodz' students have gone on to train other future superstars at their own wrestling academies. Rodz founded the independent wrestling promotion known as World of Unpredictable Wrestling.

=== Wrestlers trained ===
- Vito LoGrasso
- Damien Demento
- Tommy Dreamer
- Big Dick Dudley
- Bubba Ray Dudley
- D-Von Dudley
- Bill DeMott
- Elektra
- Jason Knight
- The Batiri
- Vince Russo
- Matt Striker
- Prince Nana
- "The Redwood" Big Bill
- Angel Medina
- Tazz
- Ricky Vega
- S. D. Jones
- Marti Belle
- Kevin Matthews
- Masha Slamovich

== Championships and accomplishments ==
- Cauliflower Alley Club
  - Other honoree (1995)
- International Professional Wrestling Hall of Fame
  - Class of 2025
- Lutte Internationale
  - Canadian International Heavyweight Championship (1 time)
- Northeast Championship Wrestling
  - NCW Heavyweight Championship (1 time, final)
- Northeast Championship Wrestling (Tom Janette)
  - NCW Heavyweight Championship (2 times)
- St. Louis Wrestling Hall of Fame

- Class of 2026

- World Wrestling Council
  - WWC World Tag Team Championship (2 times) – with Super Medico I
  - WWC North American Tag Team Championship (2 times) – with Super Médico I
  - WWC Caribbean Heavyweight Championship (1 time)
  - WWC Caribbean Tag Team Championship (3 times) – with Super Médico I
- World Wrestling Federation
  - WWF Hall of Fame (Class of 1996)
- Américas Wrestling Federation
  - AWF World Tag Team Championship (1 time) - with Dr. Terror
