= Young Stallions =

Professional wrestling tag team

The Young Stallions

Tag team
- Members: Jim Powers; Paul Roma
- Billed heights: Powers: 5 ft 11 in (1.80 m); Roma: 5 ft 11 in (1.80 m)
- Combined billed weight: 481 lb (218 kg; 34.4 st)
- Hometown: Detroit, Michigan
- Debut: March 1987
- Disbanded: August 7, 1989
- Years active: 1987–1989

The Young Stallions were a professional wrestling tag team composed of Jim Powers and Paul Roma who competed in the World Wrestling Federation (WWF) from 1987 to 1989.

== Career ==
The two youngsters were put together to be used as enhancement talent by the WWF booking team in March 1987 in what at first likely seemed to be a one-time pairing on March 21, 1987 at a WWF Superstars taping in Las Vegas, NV. Falling to Demolition, Roma & Powers would then go on to lose televised matches to The New Dream Team (Greg Valentine and Dino Bravo) (March 22), and Butch Reed & The Iron Sheik & Nikolai Volkoff (April 23). Finally, a bit of success came at a WWF Superstars taping on April 24 when the two teamed with Tito Santana in a winning effort against Bob Orton, Don Muraco, and Tiger Chung Lee. Shortly after Roma & Powers began teaming on the house show circuit, losing to Demolition and defeating fellow preliminary team The Shadows. Meanwhile, on television, Roma & Powers would again lose to Demolition in May on WWF Superstars, followed by a loss to the New Dream Team on Wrestling Challenge.

The team's first significant victory would come in a huge upset victory over Bob Orton & Don Muraco at Madison Square Garden on May 18. in a house show. The match would air on Prime Time Wrestling later that month. During this time, Powers also wrestled Bob Orton in the house show circuit, all in the losing side for Powers. Roma & Powers would follow this with televised victories over The Shadows (Randy Colley & Jose Luis Rivera) on June 20. This momentum was quickly squashed when the duo teamed with Mario Mancini and Don Driggers in a squad match loss on June 2 to the newly formed Bobby Heenan family (King Kong Bundy, Hercules, Harley Race, and a returning Paul Orndorff). For the next two months Roma & Powers would wrestle The Islanders on house shows, where they were winless.

The team's first big break came on August 8, 1987 when they faced WWF Tag-Team Champions The Hart Foundation. Roma & Powers scored a tremendous upset victory in a reversed victory in a non-title matchup. The win was the beginning of a push for the team, which soon began winning multiple encounters with Muraco & Orton (who were beginning to early turn on each other) on the house show circuit as the summer closed. Another huge upset victory came on August 20 when they upended Kamala & Sika via countout on WWF Superstars. On August 30 they again defeated The Hart Foundation, this time via disqualification in a match on Prime Time Wrestling. Meanwhile, on the house show circuit the team won several encounters with The New Dream Team.

That fall the Roma & Powers pairing finally received an official moniker, The Young Stallions. The team seemingly received their name by accident when play-by-play commentator Vince McMahon referred to them once as "a couple of young stallions", thus naming the team. The Stallions would soon acquire the music intended for the Hart Foundation, "Crank it Up", and entered a short feud with the WWF Tag-Team Champions. The Stallions received their first ever Saturday Night's Main Event matchup, where they narrowly fell to The Hart Foundation in a match that aired on October 3. This did little to stall the momentum that the team now had, and Roma & Powers scored the biggest victory of their careers when they became one of only two surviving teams alongside The Killer Bees in the elimination tag team match at the first annual 1987 Survivor Series pay-per-view on November 26, 1987.

The Stallions success took a small hit at the 1988 Royal Rumble, where Roma & Powers lost a best of three falls match to The Islanders in two straight falls (Roma appeared to suffer a legitimate knee injury during the match). Despite this Roma & Powers continued to enjoy success that winter, winning house show encounters with The Bolsheviks, The Alaskans (Dave Wagner & Rick Renslow), and The Conquistadors. The latter had many matches taking place in the original Boston Garden. On March 7, 1988, nearly a year after their initial encounter Roma & Powers again faced Demolition on Prime Time Wrestling. This time the match was much closer, with Demolition winning. The teams would later face on a house show match on March 20 in Lafayette, LA. Subbing for Strike Force, the Stallions gained their first victory over Demolition. Less than two weeks later they faced again in Lugano, Switzerland on April 1, with the Stallions scoring a huge upset victory.

However WWF owner Vince McMahon seemed to lose interest in the idea of pushing the team. This may have been due, in part, to the fact that Powers and Roma did not get along with each other behind the curtain, as well as the arrival of The Rockers as another viable babyface team at the end of May. The Stallions lost house show matches to the Rougeau Brothers in May, then dropped multiple encounters to The Bolsheviks the following month. Roma & Powers even lost to The Conquistadors on a house show in Warwick, RI on July 3, and by the end of the summer had lost all momentum, falling in multiple encounters to The Killer Bees. The team that had shocked the world less than a year earlier was now devoid of a push, and was fodder for The Brain Busters in the fall. A year after winning the inaugural Survivor Series, The Young Stallions found themselves the second team eliminated.

As Roma & Powers limped into 1989 at nearly the very bottom of the tag-team ranks, their teaming became more infrequent. After several losses to The Twin Towers (Akeem and the Big Boss Man) in January, the Young Stallions would not be seen together until a Madison Square Garden victory on March 18 against The Conquistadors, followed by a Boston Gardens victory the next night. That would be the last pairing of the two until June 19, when the Stallions defeated Boris Zukhov & Barry Horowitz on Prime Time Wrestling. This would also be their final victory, as the duo remained dormant until they reunited one last time in a loss to The Powers of Pain on August 7 on Prime Time Wrestling. Without an official announcement or angle to end the partnership, Roma and Powers went their separate ways, competing once again full-time in the singles division.

== Aftermath ==
Powers and Roma both went back to being "enhancement talent" who would lose to bigger stars to make them look good. In the spring of 1990 Paul Roma began to team with Hercules, with both turning heel in June 1990, taking the name Power and Glory. One of the first matches the newly formed team had was against Jim Powers & Jim Brunzell, in which Roma and Hernandez were victorious. Roma finally faced Jim Powers in singles competition in six house show matches in August 1990, coming out victorious in each encounter. Power & Glory would last until October 1991, when Roma left the WWF. Powers would remain with the WWF until October 1994, occasionally teaming with various wrestlers, and ended his tenure on a winning streak.

== See also ==
- Power and Glory
