= The Bolsheviks =

Professional wrestling tag team

Tag team
- Members: Nikolai Volkoff; Boris Zhukov; Slick (manager)
- Name: The Bolsheviks
- Billed heights: Volkoff: 6 ft 4 in (1.93 m); Zhukov: 6 ft 2 in (1.88 m)
- Combined billed weight: 606 lb (275 kg)
- Billed from: Soviet Union
- Debut: 1987
- Disbanded: 1990
- Years active: 1987–1990

The Bolsheviks were a professional wrestling tag team in the World Wrestling Federation (WWF) from late 1987 until the spring of 1990. The team was composed of Nikolai Volkoff and Boris Zhukov portraying a pair of Soviet-themed bad guys. Volkoff was born Josip Peruzovic on October 14, 1947. Although he portrayed a Russian as a wrestler, he was, in fact, from Croatia. Zhukov was an American named Jim Harrell, who had spent the previous few years of his wrestling career portraying a Russian from Siberia.

== Team history ==
=== 1987 ===
Zhukov was brought in from the American Wrestling Association as Volkoff's partner in 1987 after Volkoff's regular partner The Iron Sheik was fired. Zhukov made up half of the AWA World Tag Team Champions with Soldat Ustinov when Zhukov left. The team made their debut on the October 24, 1987 edition of 'WWF Superstars of Wrestling', defeating Lance Allen and Sonny Rodgers. The team then appeared in a 10-man battle royal on the following episode of WWF Superstars on October 31, 1987. As with the previous pairing of Volkoff and The Iron Sheik, the Bolsheviks were managed by Slick. The pair made their first pay-per-view (PPV) appearance together in the 10 team elimination match at the inaugural Survivor Series in 1987. The pair had little success and were the first team eliminated from the match. In December they began to feud with The Young Stallions and had success against the young duo on house shows around the country, while also facing The British Bulldogs later in the month.

=== 1988 ===
The Bolsheviks began the new year on NBC television, as they received a title opportunity against WWF World Tag Team Champions Strike Force on the January 2 edition of Saturday Night's Main Event XIV. Zhukov and Volkoff were unsuccessful, and then began a house show series against The Killer Bees. They accumulated multiple losses to Blair and Brunzell that month, then rebounded in February and secured several wins against The Rougueau Brothers, Killer Bees, and Young Stallions. The duo's next prominent appearance came in the 20 man battle royal held at WrestleMania IV in Atlantic City.

During the spring Zhukov and Volkoff began to sustain more losses than wins in continuing house show encounters with The Young Stallions and The Killer Bees. On July 3 they faced the latest signing from Jim Crockett Promotions, The Powers of Pain and were defeated. While gearing up for a pivotal televised match against The Powers of Pain at SummerSlam they began a house show series with The British Bulldogs that saw both teams secure victories. They appeared on a WWF coliseum VHS cassette called Best of the WWF volume 17 and scored a major win when they defeated The British Bulldogs in short time in a match that was recorded in Philadelphia, Pennsylvania on July 23. The Bolsheviks wrestled The Powers of Pain at SummerSlam '88, and were defeated.

The Bolsheviks began to slide down the card in the fall of 1988 and were winless in encounters with The Powers of Pain, The Hart Foundation, and in a match with WWF World Tag Team Champions and fellow heels Demolition with whom the audience sided against the Bolsheviks. A month later, the duo was once again a part of the 10 team elimination match held at Survivor Series '88, this time captained by Demolition (who would end the night turning babyface.) During the match Zhukov pinned Jim Powers thus eliminating The Young Stallions, but they were also eliminated shortly after by The Rockers. On November 28 they finally gained their first victory since the summer, when they teamed with fellow Slick protege Akeem and defeated Sam Houston and The Young Stallions on November 29 edition of Prime Time Wrestling. At the end of December 1988 they were programmed against the latest acquisition from Crockett, The Bushwhackers.

=== 1989 ===
The duo continued their house show series with The Bushwhackers in January and February and continued to be winless. They were now at the bottom of the card in the tag-team division, and the partnership went into hiatus when Volkoff took a sabbatical from the WWF in March 1989 to go compete in the independents. Slick was also phased out as their manager around this time, but did appear in Zhukov's corner as Zhukov faced a returning Jimmy Snuka during the May 27 episode of Saturday Night's Main Event XXI. In Volkoff's absence Zukhov became an opening card singles wrestler mostly working as a jobber and faced much of the WWF roster as the year progressed. Finally on September 29, 1989, Nikolai returned, and he Zhukov reformed the Bolsheviks, and began to face The Rockers in losing efforts on house shows. On the October 30 edition of Prime Time Wrestling The Bolsheviks finally obtained their first victory of the year when they defeated Trent Knight and Reno Riggins. After several more victories against preliminary wrestlers in televised matches, Volkoff and Zhukov renewed their rivalry with The Bushwhackers in December, but went winless in all of their matches.

=== 1990 ===
The Bolsheviks began the year with an encounter with The Hart Foundation on the January 1 edition of Prime Time Wrestling. Two weeks later they fell to Demolition on Prime Time Wrestling. On the house show circuit they continued their series with The Bushwhackers, but were winless throughout January and February. On the March 10, 1990 edition of Superstars of Wrestling a match between The Bolsheviks and The Hart Foundation was announced for WrestleMania VI. At the PPV event they were received music "lessons" from Steve Allen. Later that night they were defeated by Hart and Neidhart in a mere 18 seconds.

=== Breakup and feud ===
On the April 21 edition of Superstars of Wrestling they received a match with new World Tag-Team champions Demolition and were again unsuccessful. On the May 6 edition of Wrestling Challenge the Bolsheviks were again defeated, this time in a rematch with The Hart Foundation. This time frustrations boiled over and Boris Zhukov and Nikolai Volkoff began to fight each other after the match concluded. They re-united for the May 19 edition of Superstars of Wrestling, only to lose to The Rockers. After the match Volkoff attacked his partner. On the May 26 edition of the show Boris challenged Nikolai to a match, effectively ending The Bolsheviks partnership.

On the June 2 edition of 'Superstars of Wrestling' the former partners faced off. Volkoff defeated Zhukov by disqualification when Boris hit him with his boot. Prior to the match Zhukov sang the Soviet national anthem as normal, while Nikolai stunned the audience by singing the American national anthem. Volkoff became a flag-waving American babyface and Zhukov remained the Russian heel. The duo feuded throughout 1990, with Volkoff dominating the feud, and ultimately culminated at Survivor Series 1990 in an eight-man elimination match when Volkoff's team of Tito Santana and The Bushwhackers, called The Alliance defeated The Mercenaries, a team consisting of Sgt. Slaughter, The Orient Express and Zhukov. Santana was the sole survivor.

Nikolai Volkoff died on July 29, 2018.

== Championships and accomplishments ==
- Wrestling Observer Newsletter
  - Worst Tag Team (1988)

== See also ==
- The Iron Sheik and Nikolai Volkoff
