= Powers of Pain =

Professional wrestling tag team

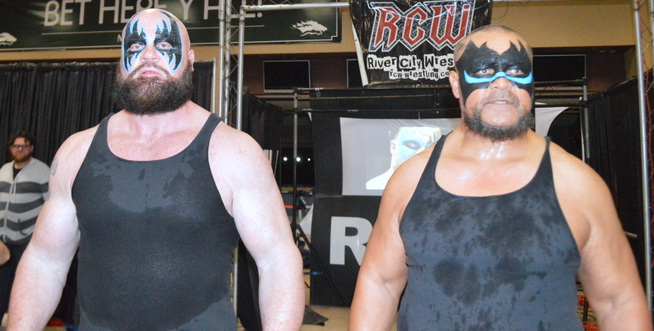
- The Warlord and The Barbarian in 2016

Tag team
- Members: The Barbarian; The Warlord
- Name(s): Powers of Pain; Super Assassins; Super Destroyers
- Billed heights: Barbarian: 6 ft 2 in (1.88 m); Warlord: 6 ft 5 in (1.96 m)
- Combined billed weight: 623 lb (283 kg; 44.5 st)
- Debut: 1987

The Powers of Pain are a professional wrestling tag team.

== History ==
Paul Jones had previously managed The Barbarian (Sione Vailahi) in National Wrestling Alliance's (NWA) territories from 1985–1987, while The Warlord (Terry Szopinski) joined the NWA in late 1986, where he was managed by Baby Doll. Soon, The Warlord and Baby Doll left the NWA and went to the Central States area, where Jones was managing The Barbarian. A feud then took place between The Warlord and The Barbarian. Baby Doll soon stopped managing The Warlord, and The Warlord and The Barbarian stopped feuding. Jones then started to manage The Warlord as well and teamed him up with The Barbarian as the "Powers of Pain". Later on Jones brought The Powers of Pain to the NWA in late 1987.

=== Jim Crockett Promotions (1987–1988) ===
After Paul Jones and the Powers of Pain came to the National Wrestling Alliance's Jim Crockett Promotions in late 1987, they were joined by Ivan Koloff.

The Powers of Pain then began feuding with the Road Warriors. During their feud, they attacked the Road Warriors during a bench press contest between the two teams, ramming Road Warrior Animal's head into a stack of weights. A (legitimate) eye socket injury suffered by Animal at the time was attributed in kayfabe to the Powers of Pain's actions. Later during their feud, the Powers of Pain won the World Six-Man Tag Team Championship with Ivan Koloff from the Warriors and Dusty Rhodes.

They feuded for several more months until the Powers of Pain left the NWA while still the champions with Koloff when the Powers of Pain refused to do scaffold matches. As a result, the Powers of Pain and Koloff were stripped of the titles. Jones would continue to use the "Powers of Pain" name for his stable in JCP even after Warlord and Barbarian debuted in the WWF under the name, but soon thereafter quietly dropped the name.

=== World Wrestling Federation (1988-1992) ===
==== Tag team championship pursuit (1988–1989) ====
The Powers of Pain made their debut in a dark match at a TV taping in South Bend, Indiana on 18 June 1988 as a replacement for Strike Force in a WWF World Tag Team Championship match where they beat Demolition by count-out when the champions walked out. Their televised debut was filmed June 21 in Glens Falls and screened on the July 16 episode of Superstars where - having earlier in the night, in a dark match taped and later released on DVD, gained another countout win over Demolition when the champions again walked out - they defeated enhancement talents "Iron" Mike Sharpe and Tony Ulysses. Upon their arrival, the Powers of Pain were faces managed by Tito Santana. They feuded with Demolition who had defeated Strike Force (Santana and Rick Martel) for the title and then injured Martel (kayfabe). The Powers of Pain were introduced as mercenaries to help Martel and Santana gain revenge on Demolition for both the title loss and the injury to Martel. They had their first televised rivalry against The Bolsheviks (Nikolai Volkoff and Boris Zhukov). They defeated the Bolsheviks in their pay-per-view debut at the inaugural SummerSlam, where they introduced their new manager The Baron. The Baron left the WWF in early November.

At the Survivor Series, The Powers of Pain led a team of fan favorite tag teams against Demolition's team of villainous tag teams in a Survivor Series match, during which a double turn took place when Demolition's manager Mr. Fuji turned on Demolition by causing them to get eliminated by count-out. The Powers of Pain afterwards came to Fuji's aid and thus became villains and Demolition became fan favorites. The Powers of Pain then eliminated Los Conquistadores to win the match before Demolition returned to the ring to confront the Powers of Pain and Fuji. Following this, Demolition and the Powers of Pain (with Fuji now in their corner) engaged in a series of championship matches at house shows, typically ending in double disqualification or a narrow countout victory for the Powers of Pain. On 12 December episode of Prime Time Wrestling, Fuji was confirmed as the new manager of The Powers of Pain. On 20 February episode of Prime Time Wrestling, Powers of Pain received an opportunity for the Tag Team Championship against Demolition, which they lost via disqualification. At WrestleMania V, Powers of Pain and Mr. Fuji competed against Demolition for the title in a handicap match, where Demolition retained the title by pinning Fuji.

==== Various feuds and split (1989–1990) ====
Following their failure to win the titles, the Powers of Pain feuded with teams such as The Hart Foundation (Bret Hart and Jim Neidhart), The Bushwhackers (Luke and Butch) and The Rockers (Shawn Michaels and Marty Jannetty). At the 1989 Survivor Series, they along with Zeus were a part of Ted DiBiase's "Million Dollar Team", losing to the "Hulkamaniacs" team of WWF World Heavyweight Champion Hulk Hogan, Jake "The Snake" Roberts and WWF Tag Team Champions Demolition. The Barbarian and The Warlord each eliminated members of Demolition, only to both be disqualified from the match for double teaming Hogan.

In March 1990, the team split, with Mr. Fuji selling Barbarian's contract to Bobby "The Brain" Heenan while selling Warlord's contract to Slick. Their final match as The Powers of Pain came on March 25 in Hershey, Pennsylvania when they were defeated by Hulk Hogan and the Big Boss Man, which strangely enough was their first pinfall loss in the WWF.

==== Reunion (1991–1992) ====
They reunited in Japan at Super World Sports on October 28, 1991 defeating George and Shunji Takano. Although not officially reunited as a tandem, The Warlord and The Barbarian would team again on January 18, 1992 at a house show in Boston, Massachusetts, losing to The New Foundation ("The Rocket" Owen Hart and Jim "The Anvil" Neidhart). Barbarian left the WWF in February 1992 and Warlord in April 1992. Barbarian would make his debut later that year in WCW and also worked in Japan, Mexico, and other international promotions. He would return to the WWF in September 1994 as Sionne of the New Headshrinkers until leaving the WWF in July 1995. Warlord would work in Japan, Germany and the independents.

=== World Championship Wrestling (1995–1996) ===
Upon returning to the independent circuit, The Powers of Pain won the WWWA Tag Team Championship together on the independent circuit in the early 1990s before later debuting for World Championship Wrestling (WCW) in November 1995. The team was put under masks as the "Super Assassins" and were managed by Col. Rob Parker. They only had five matches together (two wins over The American Males and The State Patrol and losses to The Nasty Boys and Sting and Lex Luger) before The Warlord left WCW due to injuries and retired in early 1996, while Barbarian stayed and formed The Faces of Fear with former Heenan Family stablemate Haku, who by then went by the name, Meng.

=== Independent circuit (2003–present) ===
They lost to The Dream Team at the Road Warrior Hawk Memorial Show on November 11, 2003. They later reformed their team in 2005 for Gladiator Championship Wrestling (GCW). The Powers of Pain reunited on September 16, 2012, in Chikara, taking part in a gauntlet match, from which they eliminated their old WWF rivals, Demolition, before being eliminated themselves by 1-2-3 Kid and Marty Jannetty.

The Powers of Pain continue to wrestle occasionally, including schedule matches for Big Time Wrestling (BTW) in February 2016.

As of 2026, they still wrestle as a team into their 60s.

== Other media ==
They filmed a shoot interview in 2004 with RF Video and spoke about their careers.

In 2008, they introduced an energy drink in association with Gladiator Championship Wrestling.

== Championships and accomplishments ==
- American Pro Wrestling Alliance
  - APWA Tag Team Championship (1 time)
- Gatineau Pro Wrestling
  - GPW Tag Team Championship
- Jim Crockett Promotions
  - NWA World Six-Man Tag Team Championship (1 time) – with Ivan Koloff
- Pro Wrestling Illustrated
  - PWI ranked them #97 of the 100 best tag teams during the "PWI Years" in 2003
- Universal Championship Wrestling
  - UCW Universal Tag Team Championship (1 time, inaugural)
- World Wide Wrestling Alliance
  - WWWA Tag Team Championship (1 time)
- Wrestling Observer Newsletter
  - Worst Tag Team (1989)
