= Slick (wrestling) =

American professional wrestling manager (born 1957)

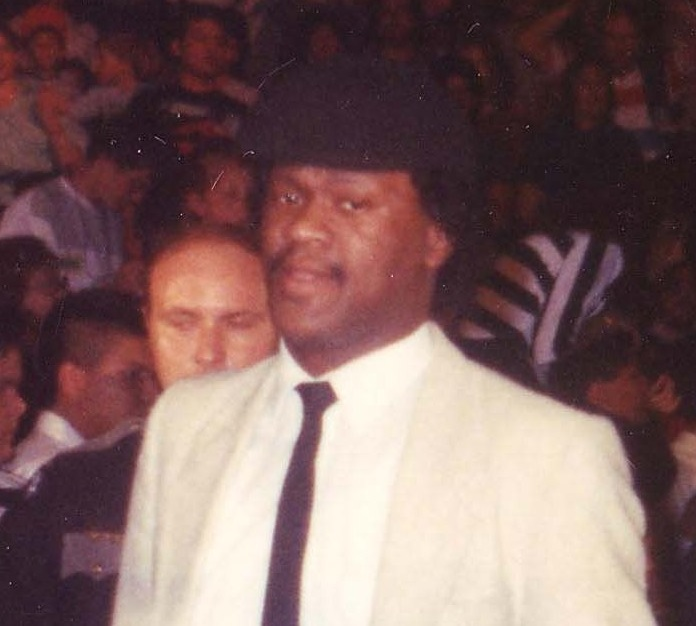
- Slick in 1989

Personal information
- Born: Kenneth Wayne Johnson; December 8, 1957 (age 68) Fort Worth, Texas, U.S.
- Education: Campbellsville University
- Family: Rufus R. Jones (father)

Professional wrestling career
- Ring name(s): Reverend Slick "Silky" Slim Johnson; Slick
- Billed height: 6 ft 4 in (193 cm)
- Billed weight: 180 lb (82 kg)
- Billed from: Fort Worth, Texas, U.S.
- Trained by: Ron Ellis; Ivan the Terrible
- Debut: 1986
- Retired: 1993

Kenneth Wayne Johnson (born December 8, 1957) is an American retired professional wrestling manager, better known by his ring name, Slick. He is best known for his appearances with the World Wrestling Federation (WWF) between 1986 and 1993. He is the son of professional wrestler Rufus R. Jones.

== Professional wrestling career ==
=== Texas ===
Johnson was trained by Ron Ellis and Ivan the Terrible. He began his career in Texas in the mid-1980s, where he appeared for Southwest Championship Wrestling / Texas All-Star Wrestling as "Silky" Slim Johnson. He managed Madd Maxx and Lord Humongous.

=== Central States Wrestling (1986) ===
In early-1986, Johnson joined Bob Geigel's Kansas City-based Central States Wrestling promotion. Here, he became the "Doctor of Style", Slick, characterized by his smooth attitude, confident speech, and dancing as he accompanied his wrestlers to the ring. Among the wrestlers he managed in Central States were the Dream Team (Art Crews and Timothy Flowers); "Bulldog" Bob Brown; "Hacksaw" Butch Reed; the New Dream Team (Hacksaw Higgins and J.R. Hogg); and the "Success Express" (Bobby Jaggers and Moondog Moretti).

Slick and his stable feuded with Kansas City mainstay Rufus R. Jones (Johnson's real-life adopted father) and other fan favorites. In June 1986, Slick and Brown lost to Bruiser Brody and Cowboy Lang. In July 1986, Slick lost a cage match to Brody. Slick and Reed were forced out of the territory after dropping a "loser leaves town" cage match to Bruiser Brody.

=== World Wrestling Federation (1986–1993) ===
Slick debuted in the WWF alongside Butch Reed in August 1986. Soon after, he purchased a "half interest" in "Classy" Freddie Blassie's heel stable. The aging Blassie was experiencing declining health and was being slowly phased out of storylines. Slick eventually took over all managerial duties from Blassie, initially managing Nikolai Volkoff and The Iron Sheik. During this time, Slick also (Kayfabe) sold the contract of Hercules (another wrestler of Blassie's former stable) to fellow heel manager Bobby "The Brain" Heenan for a "pile of money".

Slick's biggest success as a manager came when he took Akeem (previously known as the One Man Gang) and the Big Boss Man, the Twin Towers, to main event matches against Hulk Hogan and WWF Champion "Macho Man" Randy Savage, The Mega Powers. The theme song "Jive Soul Bro" (written by David Wolff, Vernie "Butch" Taylor, and Jeff Batter) was the subject of a music video featuring him. Slick would also manage The Bolsheviks (Volkoff and Boris Zhukov), Rick Martel, Power and Glory (Hercules and Paul Roma), and The Warlord. While Slick's billed height was only 5'11, he was actually 6'4. In later shoot interviews, Slick mentioned that he was often as tall as (or, in the case of Power and Glory, taller than) the wrestlers he managed, which created some backstage tension as both managers and referees were generally smaller so as to make the wrestlers seem bigger and more imposing to the public.

In November 1991, Slick went on an extended leave of absence after being powerslammed by Davey Boy Smith. He returned a month later as the face "Reverend Slick", denouncing his shady past and striving to become a better man. This gimmick was a take on his real life, as Johnson was a born-again Christian. He sometimes appeared on WWF programming to give a "sermon" that was usually a simple, uplifting message. Then later in November 1991, he joined the crew on Prime Time Wrestling as a regular full-time panelist, providing commentary and insight on storylines and matches until the show ended in 1993, as well as the co-host of WWF Wrestling Spotlight with Gene Okerlund. After Prime Time ended, his main storyline under this gimmick was to take Kamala from the hands of Harvey Wippleman and Kim Chee to convince him that he was not just a Ugandan monster who deserved constant berating, but a man, and he tried to instill Kamala with self-respect (including a memorable segment where Slick and Kamala went bowling).

=== Late career ===
After leaving the WWF, Johnson graduated from Campbellsville University. He received a bachelor's and master's degree and is now an ordained minister in Louisville, Kentucky. On April 1, 2007, Johnson, reprising his role as Slick, appeared at WrestleMania 23, dancing with various WWE wrestlers and legends. Johnson also made several appearances for IHWE, an independent promotion in Fort Worth, Texas in 2009. Johnson was inducted into the IHWE Hall of Fame on October 30, 2009. Johnson also appeared in June 2010 at the promotion's Supercard.

Johnson reprised the Slick character on the "Old School" edition of WWE Raw on November 15, 2010, joining legends the Iron Sheik and Nikolai Volkoff in the ring. In 2012, Johnson appeared for TX Stampede Wrestling where he received a lifetime achievement award. On July 23, 2012, Johnson made a special appearance on Raw 1000. He served as the reverend presiding over the wedding that involved Daniel Bryan and AJ Lee. On April 2, 2016, Johnson appeared as Slick to induct Big Boss Man into that year's class of the WWE Hall of Fame.

In July 2016, Johnson was named part of a class action lawsuit filed against WWE which alleged that wrestlers incurred traumatic brain injuries during their tenure and that the company concealed the risks of injury. The suit was litigated by attorney Konstantine Kyros, who has been involved in a number of other lawsuits against WWE. The lawsuit was dismissed by US District Judge Vanessa Lynne Bryant in September 2018. In September 2019, when asked on a podcast if he has any regrets of being a part of the lawsuit, he stated, "Of course not." In September 2020, an appeal for the lawsuit was dismissed by a federal appeals court.

== Awards and accomplishments ==
- World Wrestling Federation
  - Slammy Award (1 time)
    - Best Personal Hygiene (1987) with Nikolai Volkoff and Boris Zhukov
- IHW Entertainment Hall of Fame
  - 2009 inductee
