= Hart Foundation =

Professional wrestling stable

Hart Foundation logo used during the stable era in 1997

The Hart Foundation is the name of several derivative tag teams and stables composed primarily of members and close friends of the Hart wrestling family. The name originated in the World Wrestling Federation in 1985 with the original Hart Foundation consisting of brothers-in-law Bret Hart and Jim Neidhart. Initially managed by Jimmy Hart (no relation), they won the WWF Tag Team Championship twice. WWE has consistently ranked the original Hart Foundation as one of the greatest tag teams in wrestling history.

The tag-team known as The New Foundation was a short-lived team formed in 1991 soon after the original disbanded. This team consisted of Neidhart and Owen Hart, Bret's younger brother. The two also teamed again in 1994, and the New Foundation name would later be used by Neidhart together with The Blue Meanie.

The Hart Foundation (sometimes called The New Hart Foundation in this incarnation) was reformed as a stable in 1997, composed of Bret, Owen, their brothers-in-law Neidhart and Davey Boy Smith as well as family friend Brian Pillman. Formed as a pro-Canadian, anti-American group, they would go on to hold all available WWF championships (the WWF title, Intercontinental title, European title, and Tag Team titles). After Pillman died in 1997, the other four continued on with the stable for another month before it disbanded.

Owen and Bret's oldest nephew Teddy Hart has used the Hart Foundation name several times together with close friend Jack Evans since the early 2000s, and they have held a championship together under the name. In 2007, several of the third generation of Harts formed a new stable, including Teddy, David Hart Smith, Natalya, Natalya's boyfriend (later husband) Tyson Kidd and close friend Ted DiBiase. This collective worked together as the Next Generation Hart Foundation in WWE's development territory Florida Championship Wrestling (FCW), where they won the FCW Florida Tag Team Championship. Smith and Kidd, managed by Natalya, later debuted in WWE as The Hart Dynasty where they won the Unified WWE Tag Team Championship.

== The Hart Foundation ==
Hart Foundation
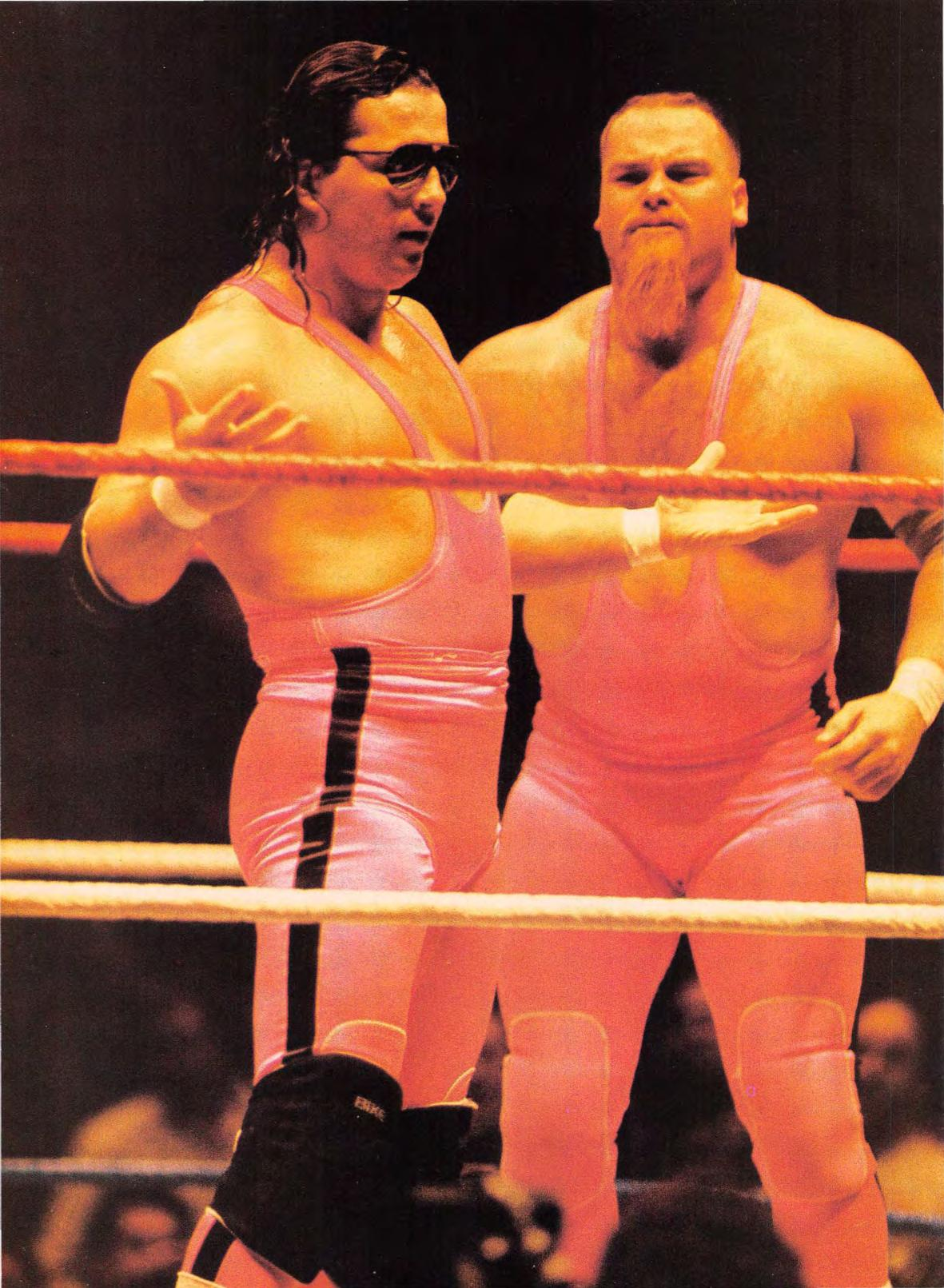
- Bret Hart (left) and Jim Neidhart (right), circa 1987

Tag team
- Members: "Dangerous" Danny Davis; Bret Hart; Jim Neidhart; Jimmy Hart (Manager)
- Name: Hart Foundation
- Combined billed weight: 515 lb (234 kg; 36.8 st)
- Debut: 1985
- Disbanded: 1991

The original Hart Foundation began in 1985, when Jim "The Anvil" Neidhart, already managed by Jimmy Hart, joined his brother-in-law Bret "Hitman" Hart to form a villainous tag team. According to Bret, the tag team originated after he turned down the "Cowboy" Bret Hart gimmick he was given, claiming that he did not really take a liking to it. He then suggested to WWF management that he would much prefer to be teamed up with Neidhart. Management first laughed at the idea, but months later just as Hart was about to quit, he was given what he wanted: he was allowed to become a villain and was partnered up with Neidhart and Jimmy Hart to form the Hart Foundation. The name "Hart Foundation" was already used to refer to the stable of wrestlers managed by Jimmy Hart, and in early matches the Neidhart/Hart team would be introduced as "members of the Hart Foundation". With the success of the new tag team, however, "The Hart Foundation" came to be associated solely with the Neidhart/Hart team and their manager, who all had 'Hart' in their family names.

The Hart Foundation made its pay-per-view debut at WrestleMania 2 in 1986 as participants of a 20-man battle royal which also included NFL stars. The duo were the final two men whom André the Giant eliminated to win the battle royal. The Harts gained their status as a mid-card team when feuding with The Killer Bees ("Jumping" Jim Brunzell and B. Brian Blair). At Saturday Night's Main Event VIII, the Foundation faced the Bees in a tag team match, which the Bees won. The Hart Foundation continued to feud with the Killer Bees for the better part of 1986.

The Hart Foundation then began a feud with Tag Team Champions The British Bulldogs (Davey Boy Smith and Dynamite Kid) in early 1987 over the title. On the February 7 edition of Superstars, in Tampa, Florida, the Harts defeated Bulldogs for their first WWF Tag Team Championship when the referee of the match, "Dangerous" Danny Davis helped the Harts to win the match, and after Davis became a member of the Hart Foundation. On the March 14 Saturday Night's Main Event X, the Harts made their first title defense against Tito Santana and "Golden Boy" Danny Spivey, retaining the title after Danny Davis hit Santana with Jimmy Hart's megaphone. Santana began to feud with Davis as a result of this action and, at this point, it was strongly suggested that Davis, as referee, had been to blame for Santana's loss of the WWF Intercontinental title to Randy Savage with the help of a foreign object a year earlier (although in fact this had predated the start of Davis' "heel referee" angle). At this point, Santana joined the British Bulldogs in their feud with the Hart Foundation. The rivalry culminated in a six-man tag team match at WrestleMania III where the Foundation teamed with Davis against the British Bulldogs and Santana. Davis hit Davey Boy Smith with Jimmy Hart's megaphone and pinned him to get the victory for the Hart Foundation. On the May 2 Saturday Night's Main Event XI, the Foundation defended their tag title against the British Bulldogs in a Two out of three falls match. In the first fall, they got disqualified because of illegal double-teaming and in the second fall Smith pinned Neidhart. However, the Hart Foundation retained the title due to the disqualification result.

On the October 27 edition of Superstars, the Hart Foundation dropped their title to Strike Force (Rick Martel and Tito Santana) after Neidhart submitted to a Boston crab applied by Martel, ending their 10-month reign. Soon after, the Hart Foundation began making claims that Neidhart had never submitted and that they were robbed on national television (the match was shown on an edition of Superstars of Wrestling). The two teams faced each other at Survivor Series in a 10-team Survivor Series elimination match. Strike Force captained a team of fan favorites while the Hart Foundation captained a team of villains. Strike Force was eliminated by the Hart Foundation, but the Hart Foundation also got eliminated and in the end, the fan favorite team won the match. The feud culminated in a match for the WWF Tag Team Championship on the February 5 The Main Event I, as the Hart Foundation challenged Strike Force for the title, but lost the match.

Bret Hart started a slow face turn at WrestleMania IV in spring 1988. Hart and Bad News Brown were the last 2 competitors in a 20-man Battle Royal and looked to be co-existing heels after eliminating the Junkyard Dog. But Brown then double crossed Hart, hitting him with his Ghetto Blaster finisher before throwing him over the top rope for the win. Immediately after being declared the winner and being awarded a huge trophy, Hart attacked Brown and smashed up the trophy starting his face turn. Neidhart eventually joined Bret's side in the feud with Brown causing a rift between the Foundation and manager Jimmy Hart. As a result, the Hart Foundation were increasingly pushed as fully fledged fan favorites. In the summer of 1988, the Hart Foundation began a feud with WWF Tag Team Champions Demolition (Ax and Smash) for the title. At the inaugural SummerSlam in August 1988, they challenged Demolition for the WWF Tag Team Championship but ended up losing the match after Ax hit Hart with Jimmy Hart's megaphone leaving Smash to get the pinfall. Jimmy Hart had "managed" Demolition alongside their regular manager Mr. Fuji for the match as part of the ongoing Hart Foundation split. On the October 29 Saturday Night's Main Event XVII, they faced Demolition in a rematch for the title but lost due to outside interference by The Fabulous Rougeau Brothers (Jacques and Raymond), old rivals of the Hart Foundation and, until a few months previously, a fan favourite team. In the late fall of 1988, Jimmy Hart signed the Rougeaus who, in the storyline, claimed 25 percent of the Hart Foundation's contract. The Hart Foundation continued their feud with the Rougeaus, and formed an alliance with "Hacksaw" Jim Duggan. At the Royal Rumble in early 1989, Duggan and the Hart Foundation defeated Dino Bravo and the Rougeaus in a two out of three falls match to end the feud.

The Hart Foundation continued to feud with wrestlers managed by Jimmy Hart through 1989. At WrestleMania V, they defeated Rhythm and Blues (The Honky Tonk Man and Greg "The Hammer" Valentine) with the use of Hart's megaphone. They also defeated several tag teams during this time. At SummerSlam 89, they faced the Tag-Team Champions The Brain Busters (Arn Anderson and Tully Blanchard) in a non-title match. When the match was made, the Busters, managed by Bobby "The Brain" Heenan, were not champions and were not obliged to give the Harts a title shot. The Hart Foundation lost the match pushing them further away from regaining their titles. In the fall of 1989, the Hart Foundation split for a while and both wrestled as singles for the first time in almost four years. Hart had a series of matches against Mr. Perfect, while Neidhart began a feud with The Warlord. However, by the end of November 1989, Hart and Neidhart resumed their partnership and were booked into a series of tag team matches with fellow fan-favorite tag team The Rockers (Shawn Michaels and Marty Jannetty). This was unusual at the time as fan favorites rarely faced each other in the ring; also, although no hostilities between the two were apparent at this time, it marked the genesis of what would become a long-running rivalry between Hart and Michaels. Most of these early Hart Foundation-Rockers matches ended in time-limit draws.

On the April 28, 1990, Saturday Night's Main Event XXVI, they faced The Rockers in a tag team match, which resulted in a double disqualification after WWF Tag Team Champions Demolition interfered. As a result of the interference, Demolition feuded with both the Rockers and the Hart Foundation. At SummerSlam 90, the Hart Foundation faced Demolition in a two out of three falls match for the tag title. By this time Demolition member Ax was suffering from health problems so a third member of Demolition (Crush) was introduced with the storyline being that the Hart Foundation didn't know which two members they would face until Demolition entered the arena. The two chosen were Crush and Smash. In the first fall, Hart was pinned by Crush but the Hart Foundation won the second fall by disqualification after Crush attacked the referee. Ax then made his way to the ring and interfered in the third fall until the Legion of Doom (Animal and Hawk) came to ringside and attacked Demolition, the distraction allowed Hart to pin Crush and the Hart Foundation won. As a result, the Hart Foundation got their second WWF Tag Team Championship (despite the second fall being decided by disqualification).

During their second reign as champions, the Harts met the Rockers again, this time in a series title and non-title matches. On October 30, 1990, Jannetty and Michaels did actually defeat the Hart Foundation in a two out of three falls match in Fort Wayne, Indiana to seemingly win the title. However, the WWE (WWF) has never officially recognized The Rockers' champion status. During the match the top rope broke by accident making the match a disjointed affair that would require serious clean up before it could be shown on TV. The Rockers actually defended the WWF Tag Team title against Power and Glory (Paul Roma and Hercules) on November 3, 1990. Shortly after November 3 it was decided to not air the title change and that the title would revert to the Hart Foundation. In his book Michaels claims that the Hart Foundation had politicked to keep the title. Michaels claim is contradicted by other claims, including one that the WWF had actually fired Neidhart, and another that his contract had ended and an agreement to re-sign hadn't been reached which forced the title change, but that after the match the two sides came to an agreement and Neidhart was brought back with the broken ring rope used as the reason to nullify the match. The Rockers were never officially credited with a title win but footage from the match was shown prior to Jannetty's WWF return in 1995. The match can be seen in its entirety on the DVD The Shawn Michaels Story: Heartbreak & Triumph. Because it never aired, the match was not clipped and thus is shown in full with no commentary; the only edit being after the second fall when a ring crew arrived to reattach the broken rope.

The Hart Foundation's second title reign lasted until WrestleMania VII when they were defeated by The Nasty Boys (Jerry Sags and Brian Knobs), when Knobs nailed Neidhart over the head with Jimmy Hart's helmet (Jimmy Hart managed the Nasty Boys at the time). The Hart Foundation split after WrestleMania VII, and Bret then focused on his singles career.

=== The Hart Foundation accomplishments ===
- Canadian Pro-Wrestling Hall of Fame
  - Class of 2022
- Pro Wrestling Illustrated
  - Ranked No. 37 of the top 100 tag teams of the PWI Years (2003)
- World Wrestling Federation/WWE
  - WWF Tag Team Championship (2 times)
  - WWE Hall of Fame (Class of 2019)

== The New Foundation ==
The New Foundation

Tag team
- Members: Owen Hart; Jim Neidhart
- Name: The New Foundation
- Combined billed weight: 508 lb (230 kg; 36.3 st)
- Debut: November 1991
- Disbanded: December 1994

After the Hart Foundation split, both members focused on their singles careers; Bret challenged for and won the Intercontinental title while Jim Neidhart faced a much tougher road as a singles competitor. In November 1991, Neidhart had a match against Ric Flair, which Neidhart lost via submission to the figure four leglock. The move incapacitated Neidhart so much that he had to be helped from the ring; as he exited the arena The Beverly Brothers made their entrance for a tag team match. The arrogant brothers took an opportunity and jumped Neidhart, further (kayfabe) aggravating his injury. When Neidhart returned about a month later, he was determined to get revenge and he even had back up. Bret's younger brother, Owen, had been signed with the company and he was revealed as Neidhart's back up. They then formed a team in the hopes of recreating the magic of the Hart Foundation and the duo was subsequently dubbed The New Foundation. Owen was soon nicknamed "The Rocket" and the duo became instantly recognizable for their unique parachute pants attire and bright colored jackets.

Their first feud was naturally with the Beverly Brothers but they also had matches with The Nasty Boys (Brian Knobbs and Jerry Sags) and The Natural Disasters (Earthquake and Typhoon). The team had their one and only pay-per-view match at the 1992 Royal Rumble, where they defeated The Orient Express (Pat Tanaka and Kato). Only weeks later, Owen Hart would be on his own as Neidhart left the federation. They were undefeated at the time of Neidhart's departure.

Owen and Jim reunited in 1994, this time as villains and without the New Foundation moniker. Owen had turned on his brother Bret in early 1994 and was deep in a feud with him. Jim Neidhart turned up at the King of the Ring tournament first to accompany Bret as he faced Diesel, but then also made a surprise appearance at the end of the night to help Owen win the tournament, resulting in Owen dubbing himself the "King of Harts". It was later confirmed that Neidhart was helping Owen. The brothers in law teamed regularly throughout 1994, feuding with Bret and Davey Boy Smith. At SummerSlam 1994, after Bret retained the WWF World Heavyweight Championship against Owen in a steel cage match, Neidhart attacked Bret; when Smith tried to make the save for Bret, Neidhart attacked him as well. On the November 7 edition of Raw, Bret and Smith defeated Owen and Neidhart in a tag team match.

The team disbanded when Neidhart left the WWF in late 1994, Owen continued with the company and began teaming with Yokozuna, with whom he won two tag team titles.

Jim Neidhart and The Blue Meanie teamed under the New Foundation name in Memphis Championship Wrestling (MCW) in 2000 and were the promotion's first Tag Team Champions.

=== The New Foundation accomplishments ===
- World Wrestling Federation
  - King of the Ring (1994) – Owen Hart
- Memphis Championship Wrestling
  - MCW Southern Tag Team Championship (1 time) – The Blue Meanie and Jim Neidhart

== The Hart Family ==
The Hart Family

Stable
- Leader: Bret Hart
- Members: Owen Hart; Bruce Hart; Keith Hart
- Debut: November 24, 1993

As part of the feud between Bret and Jerry Lawler, at the 1993 Survivor Series Bret and his brothers Keith, Bruce and Owen faced Shawn Michaels and his three masked knights (The Red Knight, The Blue Knight and The Black Knight). The Knights theme was used as the team was supposed to be led by Lawler, who was having legal troubles at the same time as his feud with Bret Hart and was replaced by Michaels. Though Owen was eliminated and Keith's shoulder was injured by a prolonged assault at the hands of Michaels, the Hart brothers were victorious. Owen's failure ignited a lengthy feud between Bret and Owen that would last for several years.

== The Hart Foundation (1997 incarnation) ==
The Hart Foundation (1997 incarnation)

Stable
- Leader: Bret Hart
- Members: Jim Neidhart; Owen Hart; The British Bulldog; Brian Pillman
- Name(s): The Hart Foundation; Hart Family; Team Canada
- Debut: March 31, 1997
- Disbanded: November 9, 1997

In 1997, the Hart Foundation re-formed as a pro-Canadian and British/anti-American family-oriented stable that was born after the events of 1997's WrestleMania 13, where Bret Hart defeated his then-nemesis Stone Cold Steve Austin in a submission match. During the match, Austin became a fan favorite and Hart became a villain. After the event, Hart reunited with Jim Neidhart and recruited Owen Hart, The British Bulldog (Davey Boy Smith), and Brian Pillman to form the new Hart Foundation.

This stable opposed the United States, and even degraded the United States and its values whereas they would speak highly of Canada and the United Kingdom (where they were beloved). The New Hart Foundation usually brought the Canadian and British flags out to their matches by wearing Motorcycle coats with the Hart Foundation Logo and name on the back, and in their promos would talk in disgust about the United States and its inhabitants in general, thus causing fan reactions and making the New Hart Foundation (and Bret Hart in particular) unpopular in the States but highly popular in Canada. Their main feud was with Austin and Shawn Michaels who (as opposed to the Hart Foundation) were booed heavily in Canada and Europe, but cheered on wildly in the United States. At Canadian Stampede, the Hart Foundation took part in a historic 10-man tag team match where the entire Hart Foundation faced the team of Steve Austin, the Legion of Doom, Ken Shamrock, and Goldust. In the end, Owen Hart pinned Stone Cold Steve Austin. The entire Hart family came into the ring to celebrate afterward.

"For some reason in the UK, Germany, Austria, Switzerland, Italy, and all the other markets that we had in those days, I had a completely different reaction from the fans in North America. I was well received in Canada and the United States but it was so much bigger over [here]."

— Hart Foundation leader Bret Hart

The first crack in the stable's success came on May 26, 1997, when Stone Cold Steve Austin and Shawn Michaels (who has been rescuing each other from attacks from the Hart Foundation and the then top two babyfaces in the company) defeated Owen Hart and Davey Boy Smith to win the WWF Tag Team Championship.

The stable was highly successful, garnering every championship available at the time (WWF Championship, WWF Intercontinental Championship, WWF European Championship, and WWF Tag Team Championship) in the WWF.

Pillman was found dead of an undetected heart condition on October 5, the day of In Your House: Badd Blood. A month later at the Survivor Series, Bret (who was leaving the WWF to join World Championship Wrestling) lost the WWF Championship to Shawn Michaels in the infamous "Montreal Screwjob". After the Survivor Series, the Hart Foundation disbanded, as both Neidhart and Smith left over the incident and eventually joined Bret in WCW, but Owen stayed, feeling that he may have been sued for breach of contract if he left.

Along with Brian Pillman, Owen Hart, Davey Boy Smith, and Jim Neidhart incurred premature deaths.

=== The Hart Foundation (1997 incarnation) accomplishments ===
- World Wrestling Federation
  - WWF Championship (1 time) – Bret Hart
  - WWF European Championship (1 time) – The British Bulldog
  - WWF Intercontinental Championship (2 times) – Owen Hart
  - WWF Tag Team Championship (1 time) – Owen Hart and the British Bulldog
- Wrestling Observer Newsletter
  - Feud of the Year (1997) The Hart Foundation vs. Stone Cold Steve Austin

== Hart Foundation 2.0 ==
Hart Foundation 2.0

Tag team
- Members: Teddy Hart; Jack Evans
- Name(s): Hart Foundation 2.0; Hart Foundation; Next Generation Hart Foundation
- Debut: 2003
- Disbanded: 2009

Hart and Evans also wrestled as the Hart Foundation 2003 in November 2003, participating in a Ring of Honor (ROH) Scramble Cage match against The Backseat Boyz, The S.A.T., The Carnage Crew, and Special K. Later, Hart, Evans, Smith, and Wilson reformed the group in Major League Wrestling.

In 2005, the original duo of Hart and Evans worked for Jersey All Pro Wrestling (JAPW), winning the JAPW Tag Team Championship from the Strong Styles Thugs (B-Boy and Homicide). They held the title for approximately four months before losing it to the Backseat Boyz. Evans and Hart began wrestling as The Hart Foundation 2.0 in Mexico's AAA on November 30, 2007. At Centro de Convenciones de Ciudad Madero for the annual Guerra de Titanes event, they participated in and lost a four-way extreme dance for the AAA World Tag Team Championship in a match against champions Crazy Boy and Joe Lider, Charly Manson and Chessman, and Extreme Tiger and Halloween.

=== Hart Foundation 2.0 accomplishments ===
- Jersey All Pro Wrestling
  - JAPW Tag Team Championship (1 time) – Teddy Hart and Jack Evans

== Next Generation Hart Foundation ==
Next Generation Hart Foundation

Stable
- Members: DH Smith; Natalya; Teddy Hart; Ted DiBiase Jr.
- Name(s): New Hart Foundation; Next Generation Hart Foundation
- Debut: June 26, 2007
- Disbanded: 2008

The name had originally been used by Teddy Hart and Jack Evans between 2003 and 2005 while in Ring of Honor.

In 2007, World Wrestling Entertainment (WWE) launched their new development territory, Florida Championship Wrestling (FCW). David Hart Smith, Nattie Neidhart, and Teddy Hart were moved to the new farm territory, where they aligned themselves and formed the Next/New Generation Hart Foundation (also known simply The New Hart Foundation) and were later joined by TJ Wilson and Ted DiBiase, Jr. At FCW's debut show on June 26, Smith won a 21-man battle royal to become the promotion's first Southern Heavyweight Champion. Plans to bring the stable to WWE's main roster were made, but Teddy Hart was released from his development contract in October. Eventually, DiBiase, Neidhart, and Smith, after losing the Southern Heavyweight Championship, were all called up to the main roster, albeit on separate shows, as DiBiase and Smith (using the name DH Smith) were sent to Raw and Neidhart to SmackDown, disbanding the Next Generation Hart Foundation. After being drafted to SmackDown, Smith returned to FCW—without ever debuting on SmackDown—and reformed the stable with Wilson. With Neidhart's (renamed Natalya) help they won the FCW Florida Tag Team Championship on October 30, 2008, by defeating Joe Hennig and Heath Slater. They held the championship until December 11, when they lost to Johnny Curtis and Tyler Reks.

=== Next Generation Hart Foundation accomplishments ===
- Florida Championship Wrestling
  - FCW Southern Heavyweight Championship (2 times) – DH Smith (1), TJ Wilson (1)
  - FCW Florida Tag Team Championship (1 time) – DH Smith and TJ Wilson

== The Hart Dynasty ==
The Hart Dynasty

Stable
- Members: David Hart Smith; Tyson Kidd; Natalya; Bret Hart
- Name(s): The Hart Dynasty; Hart Trilogy; New Hart Foundation
- Debut: 2008
- Disbanded: November 15, 2010

The Hart Dynasty stable appeared in World Wrestling Entertainment from 2008 to 2010. The unit consisted of the tag team of Tyson Kidd and David Hart Smith, and Natalya as a manager and women's wrestler. They were sometimes managed by Natalya and David's uncle, Bret Hart after his return to WWE in 2010, accompanied by the Keegans, Mark, Josh, and Matt.

=== The Hart Dynasty accomplishments ===
- World Wrestling Entertainment
  - World Tag Team Championship (1 time, final reign) – David Hart Smith and Tyson Kidd
  - WWE Tag Team Championship (1 time) – David Hart Smith and Tyson Kidd
  - WWE United States Championship (1 time) – Bret Hart
  - WWE Divas Championship (1 time) – Natalya

== New Era Hart Foundation ==
New Era Hart Foundation

Stable
- Members: Davey Boy Smith Jr. Teddy Hart; Brian Pillman Jr.
- Name(s): New Era Hart Foundation; The New Hart Foundation; The Hart Foundation
- Debut: 2018

In 2018, a new Hart Foundation group was formed in Major League Wrestling, with Teddy Hart, Davey Boy Smith Jr. (Harry Smith) and Brian Pillman Jr. as the three members.

On October 23, 2019, Teddy Hart announced on his Twitter page that Kenny "Gorilla Blanco" Lester was an official member of the Hart Foundation.

=== New Era Hart Foundation accomplishments ===
- Major League Wrestling
  - MLW World Middleweight Championship (1 time) – Teddy Hart
  - MLW World Tag Team Championship (1 time) – Teddy Hart, Davey Boy Smith Jr, and Brian Pillman Jr

== Other versions ==
In 2002, Teddy Hart formed a team with his cousin Harry Smith, TJ Wilson, Nattie Neidhart, and Jack Evans in Stampede Wrestling. In 2013 Jim Neidhart and Harry Smith wrestled for an independent promotion under the Hart Foundation name.

== See also ==
- Owen Hart Foundation
