= Royal Rumble (1989) =

World Wrestling Federation pay-per-view event

- Promotional poster featuring various WWF wrestlers
- Promotion: World Wrestling Federation
- Date: January 15, 1989
- City: Houston, Texas
- Venue: The Summit
- Attendance: 19,000
- Tagline: No Partners...30 Opponents

Pay-per-view chronology
← Previous; Survivor Series	Next → WrestleMania V

Royal Rumble chronology
← Previous; 1988	Next → 1990

The 1989 Royal Rumble was a professional wrestling pay-per-view (PPV) event produced by the World Wrestling Federation (WWF, renamed WWE in 2002). It was the second annual Royal Rumble event, but the first to air on PPV after the inaugural 1988 event aired as a television special. It took place on January 15, 1989, at The Summit in Houston, Texas. It centered on the men's Royal Rumble match, a modified battle royal in which the participants enter at timed intervals instead of all beginning in the ring at the same time. With the event's move to PPV, the Royal Rumble became one of the WWF's original four annual PPV events, along with WrestleMania, SummerSlam, and Survivor Series, later referred to as the "Big Four".

Six matches were contested at the event, including two dark matches. The main event was the 1989 Royal Rumble match, which was won by Big John Studd, who last eliminated Ted DiBiase. This year's event increased the number of participants in the match to 30 after the prior year's event featured 20. Featured matches on the undercard were Jim Duggan and The Hart Foundation (Bret Hart and Jim Neidhart) defeating Dino Bravo and The Fabulous Rougeaus (Jacques and Raymond Rougeau) in a two-out-of-three falls match, Rockin' Robin defeating Judy Martin to retain the WWF Women's Championship, and King Haku defeating Harley Race to retain his King of the Ring crown and cape.

== Production ==
=== Background ===
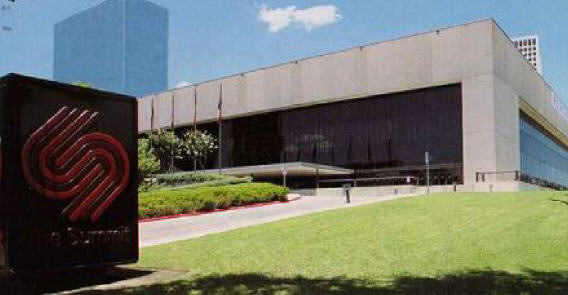
The second annual Royal Rumble event was held at The Summit in Houston, Texas.

In 1988, the professional wrestling promotion World Wrestling Federation (WWF, renamed WWE in 2002) debuted the men's Royal Rumble match, although a non-televised version had been tested in 1987. The match was a modified battle royal in which the participants entered at timed intervals instead of all beginning in the ring at the same time. The inaugural match featured 20 wrestlers, and the inaugural event was named after the match, which aired as a television special on the USA Network. A second event was subsequently scheduled to be held on January 15, 1989, at The Summit in Houston, Texas, thus establishing the Royal Rumble as an annual January event. Unlike the previous year, however, the 1989 event was instead broadcast via pay-per-view (PPV), in turn becoming one of the promotion's original four PPVs, along with WrestleMania, SummerSlam, and Survivor Series, which would be referred to as the "Big Four". It was also the first to feature 30 wrestlers in the titular match, which is now the traditional number of participants.

=== Storylines ===
The main feud heading into the Royal Rumble was between the 30 superstars from the entire WWF roster, who were selected to participate in the first-ever 30 man Royal Rumble match. Big John Studd returned to WWF in late 1988, and turned babyface after not siding with former manager Bobby Heenan, and began a feud with Heenan's client André the Giant. Both men signed to participate in the Royal Rumble match. Mr. Perfect, who joined WWF in the summer of 1988, was pushed as an undefeated heel wrestler, entering his name into the match. Bad News Brown was pushed as an arrogant powerful heel who was an enemy of face and heel wrestlers. As a result, he also entered his name into the match. Many tag team wrestlers also selected to participate in the match and selected their entry numbers. The Mega Powers (Hulk Hogan and WWF Champion Randy Savage) were involved in a feud with The Twin Towers (Akeem and The Big Boss Man) since November 1988. At Survivor Series, Mega Powers became the survivors for their team in a Survivor Series match against Twin Towers. Since then, Mega Powers and Twin Towers had been at odds and both teams signed to participate in the Royal Rumble.

The second feud heading into the event featured Jim Duggan against Dino Bravo, and The Fabulous Rougeaus (Jacques and Raymond Rougeau). Since joining the WWF in early 1987, Duggan used an American patriot gimmick, coming to the ring with an American flag, and feuding with non-American wrestlers in the WWF roster (such as Nikolai Volkoff). In early 1989, Duggan began feuding with the French-Canadians, Bravo, and the Rougeau brothers, battling them with different partners. At a live event on January 6 in Montreal, Duggan teamed with Hulk Hogan and Ron Garvin to defeat Bravo and the Rougeaus. He was scheduled to battle Bravo and Rougeaus in a two out of three falls match at Royal Rumble, so he found partners in The Hart Foundation (Bret Hart and Jim Neidhart). Hart Foundation and Rougeau Brothers had been feuding with each other since 1987. Rougeaus unsuccessfully challenged Harts several times for the WWF Tag Team Championship in summer of 1987, but did not become champions. They were in opposite teams against each other at Survivor Series 1988, where Bret eliminated Rougeau in the first place.

== Event ==
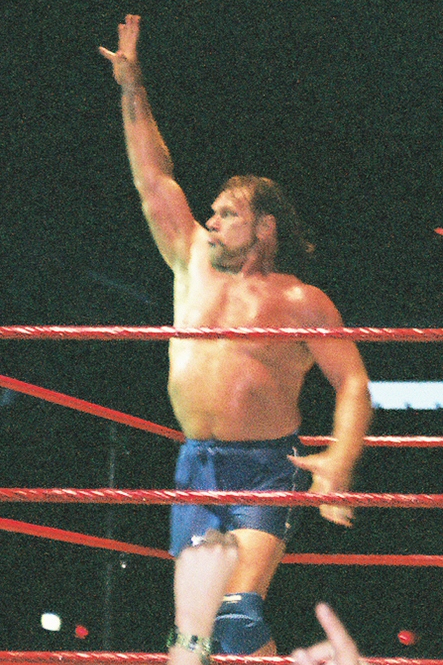
Jim Duggan, who teamed with The Hart Foundation in a two out of three falls match against Dino Bravo and The Fabulous Rougeaus

Before the event aired live on pay-per-view (PPV), Jim Powers defeated Barry Horowitz, and Sam Houston defeated Steve Lombardi in dark matches.

=== Premilinary matches ===
The first televised match was a two out of three falls match between Jim Duggan and The Hart Foundation (Bret Hart and Jim Neidhart) vs. Dino Bravo and The Fabulous Rougeaus (Jacques Rougeau and Raymond Rougeau). The powerful Neidhart and Bravo started the match. Duggan tagged in and Bravo ran to tag in Raymond. Duggan caught Raymond and connected with a scoop slam and an Old Glory. Duggan tagged in Bret Hart, who pinned Raymond with an inside cradle for a near-fall. He got Raymond with a sunset flip pinfall and then he hit a diving crossbody for another near-fall. Jacques tagged in and got a near-fall with a sunset flip on Hart, but Hart clotheslined Jacques and took him to the corner. Jacques' partners did try to help, but Neidhart ground Bravo and Raymond by a shoulder block. Raymond pulled the rope down causing Hart to fall on the floor. Bravo hit a side suplex in the ring but didn't cover and instead tagged in Raymond who hit Hart with a Bombe de Rougeau and pinned him to get the first fall. Rougeau brothers continued to beat Hart, who was caught in Jacques' Boston crab. Hart managed to reach his corner. Jacques tried to hit a bulldog on Hart, but Hart countered it into an inverted atomic drop. Duggan tagged in and hit a scoop slam on Raymond, followed by a forearm smash by Neidhart. He hit Bravo with a shoulder block and Duggan slingshotted Hart on Raymond and hit an elbow drop on Raymond and pinned him, getting the second fall. Bravo tagged in and hit Duggan with an atomic drop, sending Duggan into the corner who tagged Hart. Hart followed it up with a backbreaker on Bravo, but Raymond shoved him from the ropes when Hart tried to hit an elbow drop. All the six men began brawling. The referee was distracted. Duggan took advantage and hit Bravo with his 2x4. Hart pinned Bravo to get the third fall and the victory.

The second match was for the WWF Women's Championship between defending champion Rockin' Robin and Judy Martin. Before the match began, former champion Sensational Sherri was in the ring and challenged the winner to a future championship match, claiming neither was as much woman as she was, before joining Gorilla Monsoon and Jesse "The Body" Ventura at the announcers' table. Robin and Martin had a lot of near-falls during the match. However, in the end, Robin hit Martin with a diving crossbody and pinned her to win the match and retain the title.

Next was a posedown between WWF Intercontinental Heavyweight Champion Ultimate Warrior and Rick Rude. The winner had to be decided by fan reaction. There were four categories: "Double Biceps", "Best Abs", "Most Muscular", and "Medley of Poses". Warrior won in every posedown. Rude, however, attacked Warrior with his metal workout bar. This posedown was so successful, and so well-received by the audience that it led to the launch of the World Bodybuilding Federation the following year.

The third match was between King Haku and Harley Race. The winner of that match would win the "King of Wrestling" crown, held by Haku. Race began the match by hitting Haku with knee lifts and suplexes. Haku no-sold Race headbutts. Race hit Haku with a piledriver for a near-fall. Haku suplexed Race for a near-fall. He missed an elbow drop on Race and both men went to the floor. Haku backdropped a piledriver attempt by Race. Race hit a swinging neckbreaker for another near-fall. Haku made a comeback by hitting Race with chops, but missed a flying splash. Race missed a diving headbutt. Both men got up and Race ran through the ropes, but Haku hit him with a thrust kick to win the match. This match was edited off the Coliseum Video release but included in the Royal Rumble Anthology DVD edition, as well as the version on the WWE Network.

Other on-screen personnel
Role:	Name:
Commentator	Gorilla Monsoon
Commentator	Jesse Ventura
Commentator	Sensational Sherri (Women's Championship match)
Interviewer	Gene Okerlund
Interviewer	Sean Mooney
Ring announcer	Howard Finkel
Official	Chief Jay Strongbow
Referee	Earl Hebner
Referee	Joey Marella

=== Main event ===
The main event was the 1989 Royal Rumble match. The first Royal Rumble occurred in 1988, but it consisted of 20 men. The 1989 Royal Rumble was the second Royal Rumble, but the first to have 30 men and the first to air on pay-per-view. Demolition (Ax and Smash) drew Nos. 1 and 2 in the match. The two partners battled with each other until the #3 entrant André the Giant came in. They battled André until Mr. Perfect entered at #4. André eliminated Smash, while Perfect and Ax began working on him. Ron Garvin entered at #5 and he also assisted Perfect and Ax in triple-teaming André, who was the largest person in the match. Greg Valentine entered at #6, while André eliminated Garvin. Perfect, Ax and Valentine triple-teamed André until Jake Roberts entered at #7. This made Roberts the first man to participate in two Royal Rumble events. The other participants left André and Roberts worked on him alone. Andre choked Roberts and threw him over the top rope. Ron Bass entered at #8. Ax and Bass battled each other while Perfect and Valentine restarted double-teaming André; André eventually got the upper hand and, after beating back Perfect, began choking Valentine until he was unconscious. One half of The Rockers, Shawn Michaels entered at #9. Perfect hit a back body drop on Ax over the top rope, eliminating him. He tried to eliminate Michaels too, but Michaels used a skin the cat to come back into the ring and almost tossed Perfect. Butch Miller, one half of The Bushwhackers, entered at #10. Jake Roberts came back and tossed his snake Damien inside the ring. André saw the snake, freaked out, and eliminated himself from the match. Roberts took his snake and went back. The Honky Tonk Man entered at #11. Honky and Valentine both tried to eliminate Michaels but failed. One-half of Strike Force, Tito Santana entered at #12 and beat out Perfect before focusing on Valentine. Bass and Perfect double suplexed Michaels. Bad News Brown entered at #13. Santana and Butch eliminated Honky while Brown messed around with Michaels until Michaels' tag team partner Marty Jannetty entered at #14. They both got together and double dropkicked Ron Bass over the top rope. Santana hit Valentine with a flying forearm smash.

One-half of The Mega Powers, Randy Savage entered at #15 and went after Brown. Valentine hit Savage with a Hammer Drop and tried to eliminate him, but Savage stayed in. Santana aided Savage in beating Valentine until one-half of The Brain Busters, Arn Anderson entered at #16. Savage backdropped Valentine over the top rope. Anderson and Savage clotheslined Michaels over the top rope, eliminating him. Jannetty pounded on Anderson. Anderson's tag team partner Tully Blanchard entered at #17. Jannetty and Blanchard beat each other. Perfect and Savage nicely exchanged each other's moves. Anderson aided Blanchard in hitting Jannetty with a spinning spinebuster. Blanchard dumped Jannetty over the top rope, but Jannetty grabbed the second rope to stay in the match, only to be eliminated by Blanchard anyway. Savage's tag team partner Hulk Hogan entered at #18 and dumped out Perfect. However, Perfect broke the longevity record, lasting 27:58. Anderson dumped Santana. Brown and Hogan had near-eliminations with each other. Butch's tag team partner Luke Williams entered at #19. Hogan and Brown eliminated Butch, leaving six men in the ring. Hogan and Savage were double-teamed by the other four men: Brown, Anderson, Blanchard, and Luke. Koko B. Ware entered at #20 and dropkicked all four of them. Anderson climbed over the top rope, but Hogan scoop slammed him. Koko hunted Hogan but was dumped out over the ring, getting eliminated. Hogan punched The Brainbusters away and then eliminated Luke. The Brainbusters went for a double clothesline on Hogan, but he ducked and instead clotheslined them over the top rope. The Warlord, one-half of The Powers of Pain, entered at #21, but as soon as he entered the ring, he was eliminated by Hogan. Warlord set the record for the shortest time in the ring by spending only 2 seconds in the ring, a record that stood 20 years until Santino Marella was eliminated in 1 second at the 2009 Royal Rumble. Brown and Savage battled each other. Hogan dumped both men out. Savage berated Hogan, beginning the breakup of Mega Powers. The two tried to battle each other until Miss Elizabeth told them to calm down. The duo embraced before Savage left.

One half of The Twin Towers, the Big Boss Man entered at #22. Hogan scoop slammed Big Boss Man but Boss Man hit him with a corner avalanche and a piledriver. Hogan tried to get rid of Boss Man until Boss Man's tag team partner Akeem entered at #23. The duo double-teamed Hogan and eliminated him. Hogan's friend Brutus Beefcake entered at #24 and took on the Twin Towers. Despite being officially eliminated, Hogan remained at the ringside area and fought with Boss Man outside. After intervention from match officials, the Boss Man re-entered the ring and Twin Towers double-teamed Beefcake until Hogan pulled the rope down, sending the Boss Man over the top rope and eliminating him from the match. The duo continued to battle each other to the locker room. With this last elimination, Hogan broke the elimination record in a single Royal Rumble match with ten. Akeem tried to eliminate Beefcake until The Red Rooster entered at #25. Rooster and Beefcake double-teamed the big Akeem until the Warlord's tag team partner The Barbarian entered at #26 and broke up Rooster and Beefcake's double-teaming on Akeem. He battled with Beefcake while Rooster received a 747 Splash by Akeem. Big John Studd entered at #27 and went after Akeem. Hercules entered at #28, followed by an already eliminated Tito Santana's tag team partner Rick Martel, who entered at #29. Everyone was punching each other before the final entrant, Ted DiBiase entered at #30. DiBiase bought the slot from manager Slick to get a better spot. He eliminated Rooster and then went after his rival Hercules, whom DiBiase had bought as a slave. Beefcake saved DiBiase and battled Hercules. DiBiase sneaked out behind and eliminated both men from the ring, leaving it to the final five participants – Akeem, Barbarian, Studd, Martel, and DiBiase. Barbarian manhandled Martel, but Martel was able to avoid a clothesline by Barbarian. He dropkicked Barbarian over the top rope, leaving it to Akeem, Studd, Martel, and DiBiase. Martel hit a diving crossbody on Akeem, but the big man caught him and threw him over the top rope. Akeem, Studd, and DiBiase were the final three participants. DiBiase and Akeem spent some time in double-teaming Studd before they quarreled with each other. Studd took advantage and dumped Akeem. Studd and DiBiase remained the final two participants. Studd slammed DiBiase and followed it up with a butterfly suplex. After a clothesline, Studd threw DiBiase over the top rope to eliminate him and win the 1989 Royal Rumble. This made Studd the first man to win a 30-man Royal Rumble (the previous match had 20 entrants).

== Aftermath ==
The Royal Rumble became an important part of the breakup of The Mega Powers. Hulk Hogan accidentally eliminated Randy Savage from the match. On the February 3 The Main Event II, Hogan and Savage faced The Twin Towers (Akeem and Big Boss Man) in a tag team match, filled with controversy. During the climax of the match, Akeem threw Savage through the ropes onto the floor with Savage's body hitting Elizabeth in the process. Hogan did not help Savage and turned his attention to an unconscious Elizabeth. Savage questioned what was happening, but Hogan did not reply. Hogan picked Liz up and took her backstage. Hogan left Savage alone in the ring to handle the Twin Towers. When Hogan returned to the ring, Savage slapped him in the face, took the championship belt, and left Hogan alone in the ring with the Twin Towers. Hogan still managed to pick up the win, however, but afterward got into a heated argument with Savage backstage. Savage declared that Hogan was jealous of him, that he lusted after Elizabeth, and that he would defeat Hogan if it came to it for the belt. Hogan tried to talk sense into Savage, but was unsuccessful as the Macho Man turned heel on his now former partner by attacking both him and Brutus Beefcake, who tried to intervene on Hogan's behalf. Hogan and Savage then began feuding with each other, which culminated in a match at WrestleMania V dubbed "The Mega Powers Explode", where Savage, who had won the WWF World Heavyweight Championship over a year earlier at WrestleMania IV with Hogan in his corner, would defend against his former friend. Hogan defeated Savage to win the title; ending Savage's reign of 371 days.

Jake Roberts and André the Giant continued their feud during the rest of the winter of 1989, with the returning Big John Studd becoming involved in their WrestleMania V match as the guest referee.

Ultimate Warrior vowed revenge against Rick Rude for his attack after the posedown, to which Rude replied that he wanted a match for the WWF Intercontinental Championship, held by Warrior. Over the next couple of months, Rude would regularly appear at ringside midway through Warrior's matches with World champion Savage, luring Warrior outside and causing him to be counted out (then afterward embracing Savage to emphasize the latter's heel turn.) At WrestleMania V, Rude won the Intercontinental title, using outside interference from manager Bobby Heenan to pin Warrior. Rude thus became the first champion in the Heenan Family.

The Rockin' Robin-Judy Martin match for the WWF Women's Championship was the last women's match for a championship title conducted at a major WWF pay-per-view event for nearly five years. Robin left the company in June 1989 and – with little to no interest in women's wrestling at the time – the title was deactivated in February 1990. The title remained vacant until 1993, when Alundra Blayze won a tournament to become the new champion.

The Royal Rumble marked the WWF PPV debut of The Bushwhackers, who arrived in WWF in December 1988 after leaving WCW whilst in the finals of their United States Tag Team title tournament. The Bushwhackers would go on to feud with the Brain Busters throughout the early part of 1989 on the house show circuit. Another PPV debut was former NWA World Heavyweight Champion "Rugged" Ronnie Garvin, who also arrived in December 1988 from a run in the AWA. After the Rumble, he and Greg "The Hammer" Valentine would feud where they exchanged televised pinfall victories on WWF Superstars of Wrestling, with Valentine winning a "retirement match" on Superstars.

Steve Lombardi would be repackaged as "The Brooklyn Brawler" on an episode of Prime Time Wrestling later in January 1989, where he attacked The Red Rooster on the set of PTW at the urging of Bobby Heenan, which also "injured" host Gorilla Moonson and started a feud between the two.

== Home media and streaming ==
The event was released on VHS by Coliseum Video in the United States and by Silver Vision in the United Kingdom. The event was edited down to two hours and the King Haku versus Harley Race match was cut in its entirety. In the UK, the video was not released until 1991 and initially came with a limited edition double-sided poster.

It was re-released on DVD in the United Kingdom in May 2004 as part of Silver Vision's Tagged Classics range, and was paired with Royal Rumble 1990. This DVD set was not released in the USA.

In 2014, the event was included on the WWE's streaming platform the WWE Network as part of its launch and remained on the service until the platform closed in 2026. As of September 2026, subscribers in multiple territories, including the US, Canada and the UK, can stream the event on Netflix, thanks to the WWE's ten-year agreement with the company.

== Results ==
No.	Results	Stipulations	Times
1^{D}	Jim Powers defeated Barry Horowitz	Singles match	6:40
2^{D}	Sam Houston defeated Steve Lombardi	Singles match	7:14
3	Jim Duggan and The Hart Foundation (Bret Hart and Jim Neidhart) defeated Dino Bravo and The Fabulous Rougeaus (Jacques and Raymond) (with Frenchy Martin and Jimmy Hart)	Two-out-of-three falls match	15:42
4	Rockin' Robin (c) defeated Judy Martin	Singles match for the WWF Women's Championship	6:24
5	King Haku (with Bobby Heenan) defeated Harley Race	Singles match	9:01
6	Big John Studd won by last eliminating Ted DiBiase	30-man Royal Rumble match	1:04:53
(c) / – the champion(s) heading into the match; D / – this was a dark match

=== Royal Rumble entrances and eliminations ===
A new entrant came out approximately every 2 minutes.

Draw	Entrant	Order	Eliminated by	Time	Eliminations
1	Ax	4	Mr. Perfect	14:37	0
2	Smash	1	André the Giant	04:55	0
3	André the Giant	5	Himself^	14:55	3
4	Mr. Perfect	11	Hulk Hogan	27:58	1
5	Ronnie Garvin	2	André the Giant	02:39	0
6	Greg Valentine	8	Randy Savage	19:52	0
7	Jake Roberts	3	André the Giant	02:08	0
8	Ron Bass	7	Shawn Michaels and Marty Jannetty	12:36	0
9	Shawn Michaels	9	Arn Anderson and Randy Savage	14:30	1
10	Bushwhacker Butch	13	Hulk Hogan and Bad News Brown	18:13	1
11	The Honky Tonk Man	6	Bushwhacker Butch and Tito Santana	04:12	0
12	Tito Santana	12	Arn Anderson and Randy Savage	12:47	1
13	Bad News Brown	19	Hulk Hogan	16:24	1
14	Marty Jannetty	10	Tully Blanchard	07:52	1
15	Randy Savage	20	Hulk Hogan	12:26	3
16	Arn Anderson	16	Hulk Hogan	10:00	2
17	Tully Blanchard	17	Hulk Hogan	08:02	1
18	Hulk Hogan	21	Akeem and Big Boss Man	11:31	10
19	Bushwhacker Luke	15	Hulk Hogan	03:08	0
20	Koko B. Ware	14	Hulk Hogan	01:08	0
21	The Warlord	18	Hulk Hogan	00:02	0
22	Big Boss Man	22	Hulk Hogan	04:18	1
23	Akeem	28	Big John Studd	18:36	2
24	Brutus Beefcake	24	Ted DiBiase and The Barbarian	13:56	0
25	The Red Rooster	23	Ted DiBiase	11:17	0
26	The Barbarian	26	Rick Martel	11:15	2
27	Big John Studd	-	Winner	12:21	2
28	Hercules	25	Ted DiBiase and The Barbarian	06:11	0
29	Rick Martel	27	Akeem	05:29	1
30	Ted DiBiase	29	Big John Studd	06:27	3

^Jake Roberts had already been eliminated when he returned from the locker room with his bag. He then removed his pet, a boa constrictor called "Damien", from the bag and then slid into the ring to chase André The Giant away, who quickly eliminated himself over the top rope to escape Jake and his pet snake.
