= WrestleMania IV =

1988 World Wrestling Federation pay-per-view event

Coordinates: 39.35499°N 74.43823°W

- Promotional poster featuring André the Giant and Hulk Hogan
- Promotion: World Wrestling Federation
- Date: March 27, 1988
- City: Atlantic City, New Jersey
- Venue: Historic Atlantic City Convention Hall (Promoted as Trump Plaza) (Note: The venue was referred to as the Trump Plaza Hotel and Casino during the broadcast.)
- Attendance: 19,199
- Tagline: What the World is Watching!

Pay-per-view chronology
← Previous; Survivor Series	Next → SummerSlam

WrestleMania chronology
← Previous; III	Next → V

WrestleMania IV was a 1988 professional wrestling pay-per-view (PPV) event produced by the World Wrestling Federation (WWF, renamed WWE in 2002). It was the fourth annual WrestleMania and took place on March 27, 1988, at the Historic Atlantic City Convention Hall (advertised as Trump Plaza) in Atlantic City, New Jersey. The announced attendance of the event was 19,199.

The main event featured the finals of a one-night, 14-man professional wrestling tournament for the vacant WWF World Heavyweight Championship, in which "Macho Man" Randy Savage defeated "Million Dollar Man" Ted DiBiase to win the title. This marked the first WrestleMania that did not feature Hulk Hogan—regarded as the WWF's biggest star in the 1980s—as a participant in the main event (though he was at ringside in Savage's corner).

The undercard featured a 20-man battle royal won by Bad News Brown, Demolition (Ax and Smash) versus Strike Force (Tito Santana and Rick Martel) for the WWF Tag Team Championship, and Brutus "The Barber" Beefcake versus The Honky Tonk Man for the WWF Intercontinental Heavyweight Championship.

Contemporary critics gave the event a lukewarm reception, noting its extended length and large number of matches due to its 14-man tournament setting.

== Production ==
=== Background ===
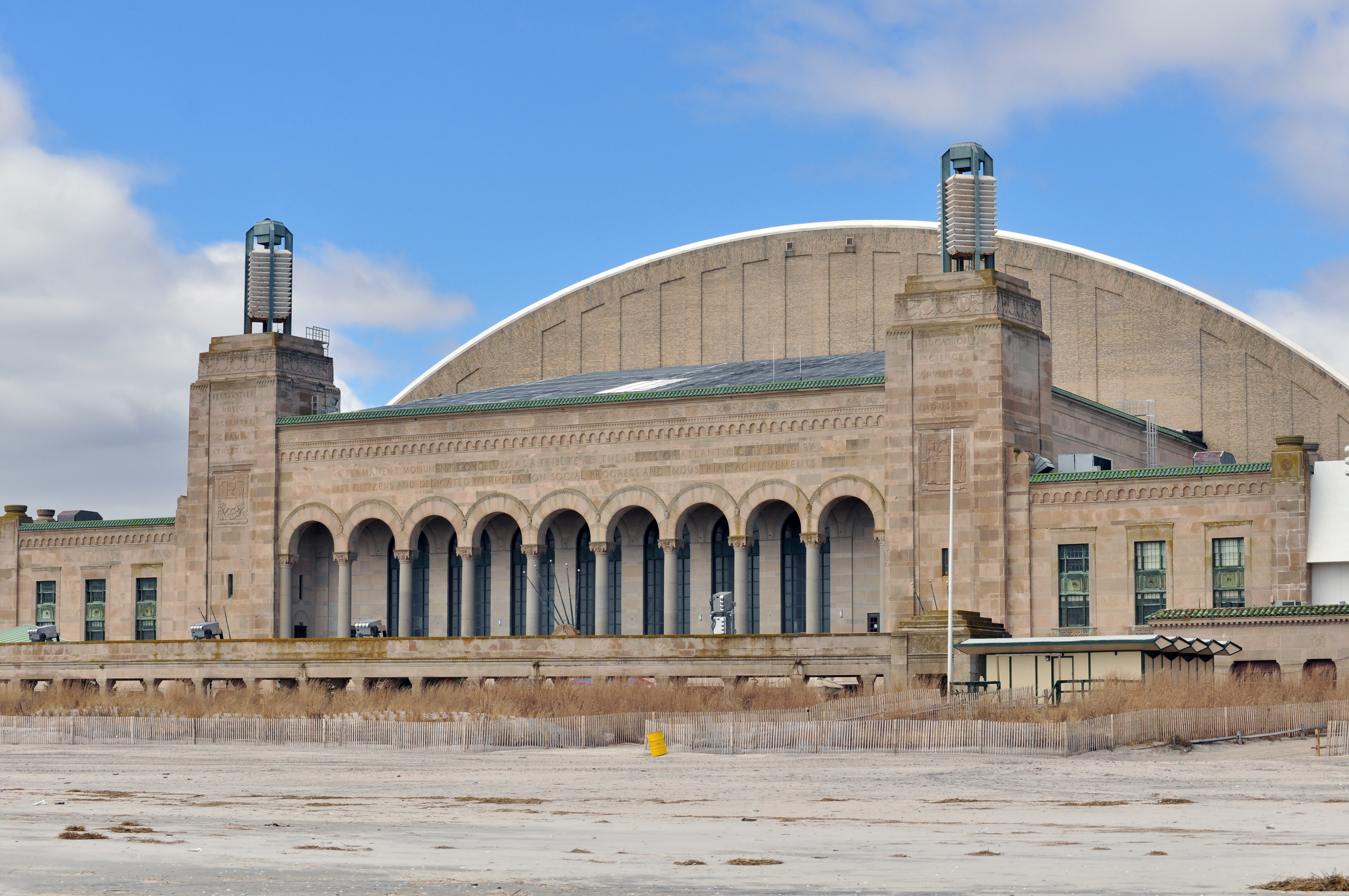
The fourth annual WrestleMania was held at the Historic Atlantic City Convention Hall in Atlantic City, New Jersey, although it was advertised as being held at the Trump Plaza.

WrestleMania is considered the World Wrestling Federation's (WWF, renamed WWE in 2002) flagship professional wrestling pay-per-view (PPV) event, having first been held in 1985. It is held annually between mid-March to mid-April. WrestleMania IV was scheduled to be held on March 27, 1988, at the Historic Atlantic City Convention Hall in Atlantic City, New Jersey. This event was advertised as being held at the Trump Plaza Hotel and Casino, but actually took place across the road at Convention Hall. Donald Trump used the event to promote his properties and was highlighted in the broadcast.

Much of the promotion of the event featured the continued rivalry of André the Giant and Hulk Hogan, who had faced off in the previous edition's main event. This took place inside of a single elimination 14-man tournament for the vacant WWF World Heavyweight Championship. The event was broadcast on closed-circuit television to various venues with a combined audience of 175,000 attendees, and also on PPV.

=== Storylines ===
==== André vs Hogan ====
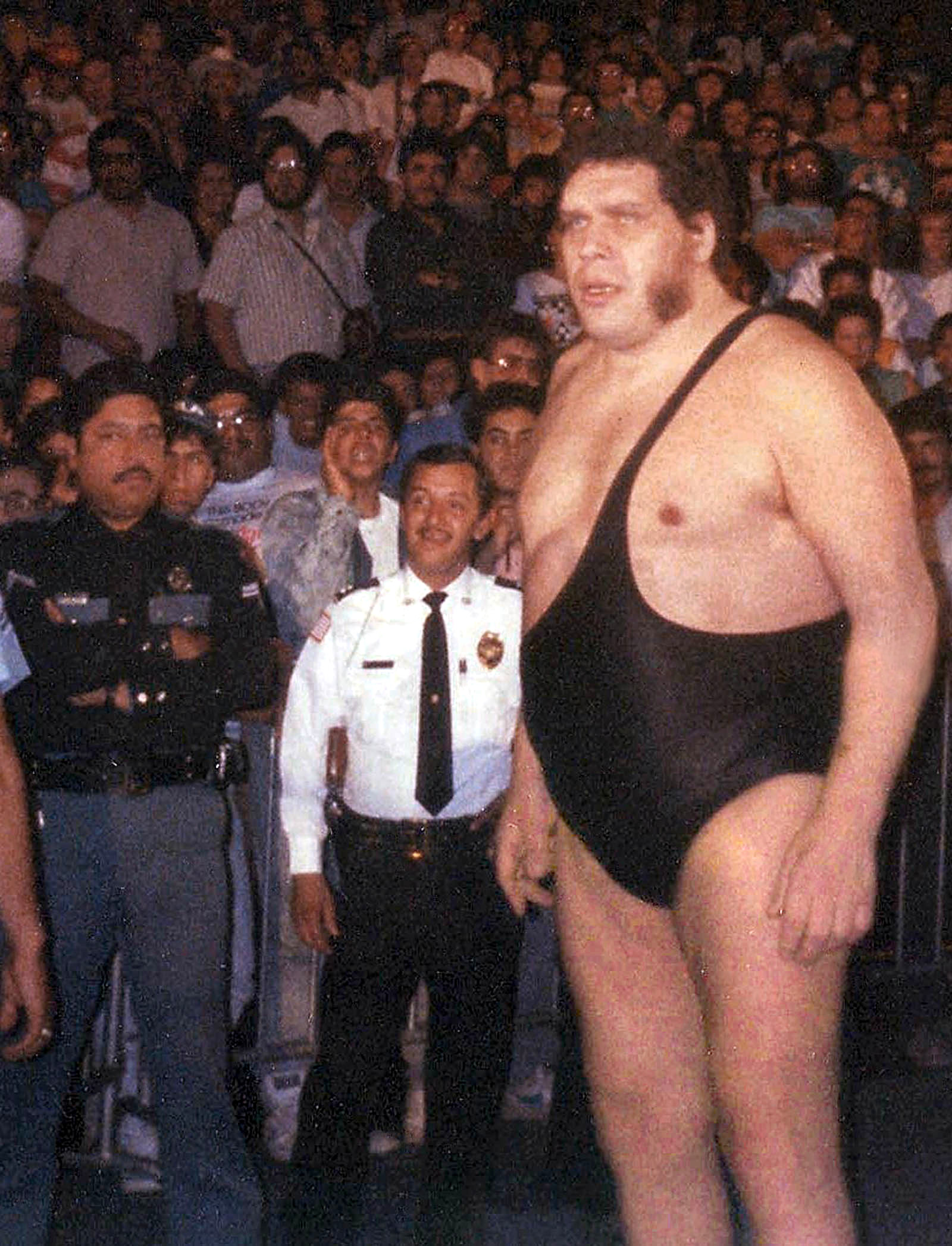
André the Giant (pictured) and Hulk Hogan met in the quarter-finals of the championship tournament, having headlined the event the year prior.

The most heavily promoted feud heading into the event was between Hulk Hogan and André the Giant, similar to the year before when the two met at WrestleMania III. In January 1987, Hogan was awarded a trophy for his third year as WWF World Heavyweight Champion, while Hogan's on-screen friend André was awarded a smaller trophy than Hogan's for being undefeated in the WWF for the previous 15 years. Hogan congratulated André over winning the award, but André exited the arena before Hogan's speech was finished. In February, on an episode of Piper's Pit, André announced his new manager, Bobby Heenan, Hogan's longtime on-screen rival. Hogan asked André to leave Heenan, which André refused. André then challenged Hogan to a WWF World Heavyweight Championship match at WrestleMania III, before ripping off Hogan's Hulkamania shirt and golden cross necklace, turning from an on-screen hero to villain (heel). At WrestleMania III, Hogan defeated André to retain the title.

At the first Survivor Series in November 1987, André along with team members One Man Gang, King Kong Bundy, Butch Reed, and Rick Rude defeated Hogan, Paul Orndorff, Don Muraco, Ken Patera, and Bam Bam Bigelow in a traditional Survivor Series match. Shortly after Survivor Series, during Hogan's WWF World Heavyweight Championship defense against Bundy, André sneak-attacked Hogan, applying a chokehold. Heel character Ted DiBiase, who was portrayed as "The Million Dollar Man", an evil millionaire, offered Hogan a large sum of money to sell DiBiase the WWF World Heavyweight Championship, which Hogan refused. At the first Royal Rumble in January 1988, Hogan and André had an official contract signing for a WWF World Heavyweight Championship rematch. Their rematch took place on The Main Event I in February, where André defeated Hogan with a dusty finish. André won the match when referee Dave Hebner's identical twin Earl Hebner made the decision.

Shortly after being awarded the championship, André kayfabe sold the title to DiBiase. Whilst André's championship reign is recognized by the WWF, DiBiase was stripped of the title. Plotwise, due to the circumstances, WWF President Jack Tunney vacated the title and ordered it to be decided in a single elimination 14-man tournament at WrestleMania IV. As the previous champions, André and Hogan received byes to the second round of the tournament, meaning they would face each other in their second-round matchup.

Hogan formed an unlikely alliance with a former enemy and top challenger to his WWF World Heavyweight Championship, Randy "Macho Man" Savage (which was later known as the Mega Powers). Savage had been portrayed as an egomaniacal heel during most of his first two years in the WWF, but in the late summer of 1987, began to slowly turn face. Their on-screen friendship was formed when Hogan (at the persuasion of Savage's valet, Miss Elizabeth) intervened while Savage was being attacked by The Honky Tonk Man and the Hart Foundation in an angle. Although Hogan and Savage teamed together at un-televised house shows, nothing more was made of it on national television until shortly before WrestleMania IV, when Hogan rescued Savage in a similar angle featuring Andre, DiBiase and Virgil.

==== Undercard ====
Brutus Beefcake had become one of the most popular WWF superstars after turning face at WrestleMania III (after several years of playing a self-absorbed heel), and after feuding with former tag-team partner Greg Valentine, was receiving his first huge push toward the WWF Intercontinental Championship, held by The Honky Tonk Man. Beefcake, now nicknamed "The Barber" after his gimmick of a barber, vowed "to cut his (Honky Tonk Man's) ducktail hair" before winning the championship. Honky, meanwhile, was portrayed as a cowardly champion, frequently relying on outside interference from manager Jimmy Hart or on-screen girlfriend Peggy Sue to win matches, or intentionally getting himself counted out or disqualified to retain his championship with the champions advantage.

Ultimate Warrior had debuted in the WWF in the fall of 1987, and his feud with Hercules was his first major angle, the two feuding over who was the stronger, gladiatorial-style superstar in the WWF. To further the angle, the two met in a match on WWF television, wherein Hercules attacked Warrior with his steel chain and beat him down, but Warrior was able to fight back, gain control of the chain and began using it on Hercules until other wrestlers and officials were able to separate the two.

After being left off the WrestleMania III card, The Islanders were in the middle of their second major feud since turning heel in the spring of 1987, going up against The British Bulldogs. The storyline began shortly after the inaugural Survivor Series, when during a match on WWF Superstars Of Wrestling, the Islanders took the Bulldogs' mascot, Matilda the bulldog, from ringside. Following a brief suspension in connection with the dog-napping incident, Islanders members Haku and Tama began bringing dog collars tied to a chain to ringside to taunt the Bulldogs. At the same time, the Islanders' manager Bobby Heenan began making remarks on the legality of having animals at ringside (in lieu of official managers), and also made derogatory remarks about Koko B. Ware's macaw, Frankie, who accompanied Ware to ringside. This led to a Six-man tag team match with manager Heenan tagging with the Islanders against the Bulldogs and Ware.

Demolition, a leather-outfitted tag team who had their faces painted in a combination of black, white, red and silver colors, received their first major push in the fall of 1987, where they began aggressively dominating and overwhelming their opponents. After dominating most of the established face tag teams, Ax and Smash began targeting Strike Force (Tito Santana and Rick Martel), which had recently become the WWF Tag Team Champions and had defeated several top heel tag teams, including The Hart Foundation (from whom Martel and Santana won the belts), The Bolsheviks and The Islanders before Demolition demanded a match at WrestleMania IV.

== Event ==
=== Opening match, 20-man battle-royal ===
Other on-screen personnel
Role:	Name:
Commentators	Gorilla Monsoon
Commentators	Jesse Ventura
Commentators	Bob Uecker (Battle Royal)
Interviewers	Gene Okerlund
Interviewers	Craig DeGeorge
Ring announcer	Howard Finkel
Special Guest Timekeeper	Vanna White (Main Event)
Supporting	Robin Leach
Vocalist	Gladys Knight

WrestleMania IV's coverage began with Gladys Knight singing a rendition of "America the Beautiful". The first match of the pay-per-view event was a twenty-man over the top rope battle royal. The winner of the match would receive a trophy. After fourteen eliminations, the final six participants were Bad News Brown, Bret Hart, Paul Roma, Harley Race, Jacques Rougeau, and Junkyard Dog.

Race hit a back body drop on Rougeau, sending him over the top rope before Junkyard Dog punched him over the top rope. Brown eliminated Roma as Junkyard Dog was left to battle Hart and Brown. The duo double teamed Dog before Brown attempted a clothesline on Dog, but hit Hart instead. Junkyard Dog hit both men with several headbutts before they both decided to cooperate and they eliminated Junkyard Dog. After eliminating Dog, Hart indicated that he and Brown would share the trophy; however, Brown caught Hart with his Ghetto Blaster before eliminating him over the top rope to win the battle royal. Brown was presented with the trophy, but Hart interrupted and hit Brown with the trophy. Hart and partner Jim Neidhart later turned babyface over the next few months.

=== First round ===
Before the 14-man tournament for the WWF World Heavyweight Championship began, Robin Leach from the TV show "Lifestyles of the Rich and Famous" outlined the background for the tournament, and how the championship was vacated. As former champions, André the Giant and Hulk Hogan were given a bye and had directly qualified for the next round. In the first round, "The Million Dollar Man" Ted DiBiase (with bodyguard Virgil and André the Giant) defeated "Hacksaw" Jim Duggan by pinfall. "The Rock" Don Muraco (with Superstar Billy Graham) defeated Dino Bravo (with Frenchy Martin) by disqualification after Bravo pulled the referee in front of him, causing the referee to be hit by a flying forearm from Muraco.

"Macho Man" Randy Savage (with Miss Elizabeth) defeated "The Natural" Butch Reed (with Slick), Greg "The Hammer" Valentine (with "The Mouth of the South" Jimmy Hart) defeated Ricky "The Dragon" Steamboat, the One Man Gang (with Slick) defeated Bam Bam Bigelow (with Oliver Humperdink), and "Ravishing" Rick Rude (with Bobby "The Brain" Heenan) fought Jake "The Snake" Roberts to a time limit draw. The winners of these matches advanced to the quarterfinals. As Rude and Roberts tied, they were both eliminated from the tournament, thereby giving the One Man Gang a bye into the semifinals.

=== Tournament intermission one, singles match ===
In his PPV debut, Ultimate Warrior faced Hercules. The pair locked up with Warrior chopping Hercules in the corner. Hercules fought back as he hit two clotheslines on Warrior, who no-sold them before a third from Hercules took Warrior off his feet. Warrior then countered a Hercules clothesline and hit a clothesline of his own. In the corner, Warrior hit him with ten punches, but while Warrior was looking at the referee, Hercules hit an inverted atomic drop. He then tried to apply his finishing move, a full-nelson, but could not lock his fingers behind Warrior's head. Warrior then pushed his feet off the top turnbuckle and both men fell to the mat with both men being pinned. Warrior lifted a shoulder before the end of the count, awarding Warrior the win.

=== Quarter-finals ===
The first of three quarterfinals saw Hulk Hogan take on André the Giant. During the match, Hogan hit André with a chair in front of referee Joey Marella. André retaliated, grabbing the chair and hitting Hogan. After both men hit each other with the chair, they both were disqualified by Marella and, as a result, were eliminated from the tournament.

The second quarterfinal saw Ted DiBiase (without either André or Virgil after Virgil had been Suplexed in the aisle by Hulk Hogan) defeat Don Muraco by pinfall. With both André and Hogan disqualified, DiBiase got a bye to the final. The third quarterfinal saw Randy Savage defeat Greg Valentine also by pinfall. As One Man Gang had received a bye in the quarter-finals due to Rick Rude and Jake Roberts having wrestled to a time limit draw in the first round, Gang faced Savage in the semi-finals.

=== Tournament intermission two, Intercontinental title match and six-man tag team match ===
Brutus "The Barber" Beefcake fought WWF Intercontinental Champion The Honky Tonk Man for the Intercontinental championship. Early in the match, Beefcake connected with an atomic drop at the outset of the matchup. Beefcake then hit Honky with a high knee, before missing an elbow drop on Honky, who took control with a second turnbuckle fist drop. Honky went for his Swinging neckbreaker called Shake, Rattle & Roll on Beefcake, but instead Beefcake kneed him in the face. Beefcake put Honky in a sleeper hold. With Beefcake in charge of the match, Honky's manager Jimmy Hart hit the referee with his megaphone. The bell did not ring, but it was announced that Beefcake won by disqualification, which meant that Honky was still the champion. (Note: Like other professional wrestling championships, they can only be won or loss by pinfall, submission or knockout unless stated in the stipulations placed before the match.) Post-match, with Honky Tonk apparently knocked out in the ring, Beefcake cut the hair of Hart with his barber shears.

The Islanders (Haku and Tama) and manager Bobby Heenan took on The British Bulldogs (Davey Boy Smith and Dynamite Kid) and Koko B. Ware in a six-man tag team match. Dynamite and Tama started the match with Dynamite catapulting Tama over the top rope. Smith tagged in, but missed an elbow drop on Tama, allowing Tama to tag Haku. Smith hit a flying crossbody on Haku for a near-fall. Haku hit an arm wrench and tagged Tama. Tama grabbed Smith's arm and came out of it with a military press slam. Tama tagged in Haku who put Davey in a backbreaker, but Smith flipped out of it and tagged in Koko. He hit Haku with a missile dropkick and a Frankensteiner. Dynamite tagged in and clotheslined Haku before he ran into Haku's boot. As a cowardly manager, Heenan tagged and stomped Dynamite before quickly tagging out to Tama. Tama hit a back body drop on Dynamite, but missed a big splash to allow Dynamite to tag Koko whilst Tama tagged Haku. Both members of the Islanders squared up to Koko prompting the Bulldogs to enter the ring. All six men brawled in the ring before being separated by the referee, who ordered the Bulldogs into their corner. The Islanders used this distraction to pick up Heenan and throw him onto Koko, leading to a pinfall victory.

=== Semi-finals ===
Next, Randy Savage faced One Man Gang for a place in the final of the tournament. Ted DiBiase had already received a bye in the semi-finals due to the double disqualification of Hulk Hogan and André the Giant and met the victor. Savage hit a hotshot on the One Man Gang, but Gang quickly took control of the match. Gang attempted a 747 splash, but missed after Savage dodged and later fell to the outside as Savage connected with a diving double axe handle. Savage then went for a scoop slam which failed. One Man Gang's manager Slick jumped on the apron and handed One Man Gang a cane; which he hit Savage with and attempted to jab him as he lay on the mat, but Savage kept rolling away. The referee caught Gang using his cane and disqualified him, awarding the match to Savage.

=== Tournament intermission three, Tag-team title match ===
Before the final round, Strike Force (Tito Santana and Rick Martel) defended the WWF Tag Team Championship against Demolition (Ax and Smash), with their manager Mr. Fuji in their corner. The match started with Strike Force hitting Smash with a double back elbow for a near-fall. Santana applied an armbar on Ax before Martel tagged in and applied an armbar, but Ax headbutted him and tagged out to Smash. Santana tagged in, but was caught in a bear hug and was clotheslined by Ax, before a scoop slam and suplex on Santana. Santana hit a flying forearm smash on an interfering Smash and tagged in Martel, who dropkicked both Ax and Smash a number of times and applied a Boston crab on Smash. Santana grabbed Mr. Fuji up onto the apron, allowing Ax to get his manager's cane. He nailed Martel with it as Smash covered Martel with a pin. As a result, Demolition won the match, and the WWF Tag Team Championships.

=== Main event, WWF title tournament final ===
Hulk Hogan preventing André the Giant from interfering in the main event bout

Randy Savage (right) celebrating with Hulk Hogan and Miss Elizabeth after winning the WWF World Heavyweight Championship

The main event of WrestleMania IV was the tournament final for the vacant WWF World Heavyweight Championship between "Macho Man" Randy Savage and "Million Dollar Man" Ted DiBiase. DiBiase was accompanied to the ring by André the Giant, whilst Savage had his regular valet Miss Elizabeth. Savage had wrestled three prior matches, whilst DiBiase had wrestled one fewer, having received a bye from the quarterfinals. DiBiase controlled much of the match, before a fightback from Savage, who attempted a diving elbow drop on DiBiase, but DiBiase moved out of the way. DiBiase applied a "Million Dollar Dream" submission on Savage. To aid Savage, Elizabeth went backstage to bring Hulk Hogan to ringside to neutralize André being at ringside.

André the Giant interfered in the match on behalf of DiBiase who, at the end of the match, had Savage in a sleeper hold. However, while the referee was distracted, Hogan attacked DiBiase with a steel chair. Freed from the submission, Savage climbed up the top rope and hit a second diving elbow drop. He followed it up with a pinfall victory. He won the tournament and the vacant WWF World Heavyweight Championship, making Randy Savage the first person to ever win the world championship at WrestleMania (as the championship was not defended at the inaugural event and Hulk Hogan successfully retained at the following two installments). After the match, Hogan, Elizabeth and Savage celebrated Savage's WWF Championship win.

== Reception ==
The attendance for the event was announced as 19,199, with a total of $1,400,000 in admission fees. This total was significantly reduced from that of the previous year's event, which sat at 93,173, and was similar to the following year's 20,369. It drew a 6.5 PPV buyrate, which was reduced from 8.0 the previous year.

WrestleMania IV received mixed to poor reviews from critics. Most reviews criticized the show's length as well as the number of matches. Rob McNew from 411Mania.com gave the show a 3.5/10 rating when reviewing the show, claiming the show was "bad". McNew was frustrated by the number of matches on the show, and the size of the tournament, saying "This show could have been so much better had they trimmed the tournament down to eight guys from fourteen. Instead, we got a bunch of short matches, none of which ended up being memorable. The show had its moments and isn't all terrible. Just way too long. Savage-Dibiase provides a great moment, but the rest of the show is a pass." Retoprowrestling.com was also highly critical of the show's length, calling it "a chore to watch", and that "there's probably nothing wrong with a wrestling pay per view running nigh on four hours, but when about three and a half of those hours don't actually feature much in the way of entertainment, it often feels like you've spent your entire weekend just watching this one show."

John Canton of TJR wrestling called the event "a below-average show", citing the event being "a 16 match card. That’s too many matches." Canton also commented on the length of these matches, and primary usage of "rest holds", and bad finishes. Bryan Rose from Voices of Wrestling called the show a "dud", before stating there was a "lot of nothing for 3 1/2 hours." Rose also suggested similarities that the event's length had to watch two Godfather films. Mike Powell of prowrestling.net called the event "really bad", and commented that had the show been less than three hours in length, rather than four, it would have been an allround better show.

However, John Powell, from SLAM! Wrestling called the event "excellent", saying that the show's greatness comes from its unpredictability. Powell, says that the show was "another tricky venture for Vince McMahon and he hits the jackpot again." Powell was very positive about the show's tournament, stating that it and Savage's title win was the highlights of the night. Bret Mix from Wrestling DVD Network commented on the structure of the event, before calling the event "average", but "underrated" for its high quality of matches throughout the show, despite the number of matches.

As an event in the annual WrestleMania series of events, WrestleMania IV is considered to be one of the stronger events; with reviews commenting that the event was most notable for starting a year-long Hogan / Savage storyline, culminating in the two facing off a year later at WrestleMania V. Scott Keith of SmarK rant gave the event a "recommendation to avoid", and commented it was "long, boring (and) dull", and that the event was simply to "serve as a prelude to WrestleMania V"

== Aftermath ==
In the months that followed the event, Savage defended the WWF World Heavyweight Championship on multiple occasions, primarily against DiBiase, but also granted title shots to others such as the One Man Gang and Bad News Brown. Hogan, meanwhile, took a leave of absence from the WWF during the late spring and part of the summer due to the birth of his daughter Brooke Hogan and to film the movie No Holds Barred. André the Giant was shortly placed in a feud with "Hacksaw" Jim Duggan, however, the DiBiase-André alliance was renewed when the two attacked Savage during a television taping for the WWF's syndicated show Superstars of Wrestling. DiBiase and Andre offered a tag team match to Savage at the inaugural SummerSlam, where Savage chose to partner with Hogan and create "The Mega Powers". The team of Hogan and Savage won the match before Savage turned heel against Hogan at The Main Event II. Hogan challenged Savage for the WWF World Heavyweight Championship at WrestleMania V, with Hogan winning the title.

In Hogan's absence, André the Giant's main focus for much of the summer of 1988 would be on Hacksaw Jim Duggan. The feud began when Duggan confronted André during a squash match involving the latter, before André suddenly grabbed Duggan and began attacking him violently, only for Duggan to knock him out with his 2x4 board. André would win a majority of these matches, although Duggan did have offensive moments in almost all of their matches.

Having wrestled to a time limit draw in the championship tournament, Jake Roberts and Rick Rude were placed into a feud regarding Rude making kayfabe advances over Robert's real-life wife, Cheryl. For Rude, this was his second high-profile feud after several months of being primarily a mid-card wrestler.

The Honky Tonk Man continued to feud with Brutus Beefcake over the Intercontinental Heavyweight Championship during the spring and summer of 1988, with Honky retaining the championship by being intentionally counted out or disqualified on multiple occasions. Beefcake was granted a "final" match at SummerSlam, but was sneak attacked by Ron Bass one week before the event. Honky then lost his championship at Summerslam to Ultimate Warrior.

Demolition defended the tag team championships against former champions Strike Force, The Young Stallions, and occasionally the Rougeau Brothers. In June 1988, Rick Martel took a leave of absence from the WWF to tend to real-life family issues, so a storyline was devised to end the Demolition-Strike Force feud, whereby Martel would be (in kayfabe) seriously injured by Ax and Smash by using their finishing move, the "Demolition Decapitation", on him outside of the ring. Following this, Santana introduced another power team, The Powers of Pain (The Barbarian and The Warlord) to avenge both the injury and title loss. The Powers substituted for Strike Force in their remaining scheduled return title matches, after which The British Bulldogs and The Rockers became Demolition's primary challengers. The Powers became top challengers again in late 1988 after an incident at the 1988 Survivor Series where Mr. Fuji lured Barbarian and Warlord to his side, thus turning the Powers into villains and champions Ax and Smash – which had been getting more fan support during the summer and fall – into good guys. Martel, meanwhile, would return in early 1989 and reform Strike Force with Santana, but during their WrestleMania V match against Tully Blanchard and Arn Anderson, Martel turned on Santana after a (kayfabe) botched move and became a heel.

Following Bret Hart's elimination from the battle royal, he returned to the ring to challenge Bad News Brown. Bret saw a face turn, alongside partner Jim Neidhart. The pair also engaged in a new feud with The Fabulous Rougeaus (who turned heel and allied themselves with the Harts' former manager Jimmy Hart) and also challenged Demolition for the tag team title at SummerSlam. Two years later, they would finally regain the belts from Demolition (by then once more villains) but for Bret Hart, this was merely the prelude to a run of singles championship success spanning the 1990s and including five WWF World championships, two WCW World championships, two WWF Intercontinental Championships and, at the time, four WCW US championships until his sudden retirement early in 2000, from which he briefly returned in 2010 to win a fifth US title. Aside from guest appearances in the USWA in 1993 as a heel WWF invader, the babyface run Bret began at this show would last until his double turn with Steve Austin at WrestleMania XIII in 1997.

Bam Bam Bigelow continued with the WWF through the summer of 1988, wrestling mainly One Man Gang and André the Giant. Bigelow, along with manager Sir Oliver Humperdink, left the WWF for Jim Crockett Promotions in September 1988, just before Ted Turner's purchase of JCP to form WCW.

Harley Race had competed in the battle royal at WrestleMania IV, despite suffering a legitimate injury during a match against Hulk Hogan taped for a Saturday Night's Main Event program aired earlier in March 1988. Following WrestleMania IV, he took several months off, and his robe and crown were given to Haku. Haku thus went on to a major singles push during the rest of 1988 and into 1989 as "King Haku," the push coming after the Islanders were disbanded with the departure of Tama (of The Islanders) and a short-lived teaming with Siva Afi, still as The Islanders. Race returned for a short run at the end of 1988, including the 1988 Survivor Series and 1989 Royal Rumble, his final major in-ring wrestling matches for the WWF in his lifetime.

Several other wrestlers finished their WWF runs at or shortly after WrestleMania IV, including Butch Reed, Sika and Ricky Steamboat, although Steamboat would return to the WWF briefly in 1991.

== Home media and streaming ==
The event was released on VHS by Coliseum Video in the United States in 1988 and by Silver Vision in the United Kingdom in 1991. Due to the length of the show, it was split across two cassettes. The first tape concludes with the Hercules versus Ultimate Warrior match. This was the only time that any WWF event would be released in this way.

It was re-released on DVD in the United Kingdom in June 2004 as part of Silver Vision's Tagged Classics range, and was paired with WrestleMania III. This DVD set was not released in the USA.

In 2014, the event was included on the WWE's streaming platform the WWE Network as part of its launch and remained on the service until the platform closed in 2026. As of September 2026, subscribers in multiple territories, including the US, Canada and the UK, can stream the event on Netflix.

== Results ==
No.	Results	Stipulations	Times
1	Bad News Brown won by last eliminating Bret Hart (Note: Order of elimination: Sam Houston, Sika, Jim Neidhart, Jim Brunzell, Raymond Rougeau, B. Brian Blair, Ron Bass, Hillbilly Jim, "Dangerous" Danny Davis, Jim Powers, Nikolai Volkoff, Ken Patera, Boris Zhukov, Jacques Rougeau, Harley Race, Paul Roma, Junkyard Dog, and Bret Hart. George "The Animal" Steele was also supposed to participate in the match however, he spent the whole time ringside and left shortly after Hillbilly Jim was eliminated.)	Battle Royal	9:44
2	Ted DiBiase (with Virgil and André the Giant) defeated Jim Duggan	First round tournament match	5:02
3	Don Muraco (with "Superstar" Billy Graham) defeated Dino Bravo (with Frenchy Martin) by disqualification	First round tournament match	4:53
4	Greg Valentine (with Jimmy Hart) defeated Ricky Steamboat	First round tournament match	9:12
5	Randy Savage (with Miss Elizabeth) defeated Butch Reed (with Slick)	First round tournament match	5:07
6	One Man Gang (with Slick) defeated Bam Bam Bigelow (with Oliver Humperdink) by countout	First round tournament match	2:56
7	Jake Roberts vs. Rick Rude (with Bobby Heenan) ended in a time-limit draw	First round tournament match	15:00
8	Ultimate Warrior defeated Hercules (with Bobby Heenan)	Singles match	4:29
9	Hulk Hogan vs. André the Giant (with Ted DiBiase and Virgil) ended in a double disqualification	Quarter-final tournament match	5:52
10	Ted DiBiase defeated Don Muraco (with "Superstar" Billy Graham)	Quarter-final tournament match	5:44
11	Randy Savage (with Miss Elizabeth) defeated Greg Valentine (with Jimmy Hart)	Quarter-final tournament match	6:06
12	Brutus Beefcake defeated The Honky Tonk Man (c) (with Jimmy Hart and Peggy Sue) by disqualification	Singles match for the WWF Intercontinental Championship	6:30
13	The Islanders (Haku and Tama) and Bobby Heenan defeated The British Bulldogs (Davey Boy Smith and Dynamite Kid) and Koko B. Ware	Six-man tag team match	7:30
14	Randy Savage (with Miss Elizabeth) defeated One Man Gang (with Slick) by disqualification	Semi-final tournament match	4:05
15	Demolition (Ax and Smash) (with Mr. Fuji) defeated Strike Force (Tito Santana and Rick Martel) (c)	Tag team match for the WWF Tag Team Championship	12:33
16	Randy Savage (with Miss Elizabeth and Hulk Hogan) defeated Ted DiBiase (with André the Giant)	Tournament final for the vacant WWF World Heavyweight Championship	9:27
(c) / – the champion(s) heading into the match

=== WWF World Heavyweight Championship Tournament bracket ===
1st Round; WrestleMania IV; March 27, 1988
Jim Duggan	5:02
Ted DiBiase	Pinfall
Don Muraco	Disqualification
Dino Bravo	4:53
Ricky Steamboat	9:12
Greg Valentine	Pinfall
Randy Savage	Pinfall
Butch Reed	4:09
Bam Bam Bigelow	2:56
One Man Gang	Countout
Jake Roberts	Draw (15:00)
Rick Rude	Draw (15:00)

Quarterfinals; WrestleMania IV; March 27, 1988
Hulk Hogan	Disqualification (5:52)
André the Giant	Disqualification (5:52)
Ted DiBiase	Pinfall
Don Muraco	5:35
Greg Valentine	6:07
Randy Savage	Pinfall
One Man Gang	Bye
N/A	—

Semifinals; WrestleMania IV; March 27, 1988
N/A	—
Ted DiBiase	Bye
Randy Savage	Disqualification
One Man Gang	4:05

Final; WrestleMania IV; March 27, 1988
Ted DiBiase	9:27
Randy Savage	Pinfall
