= WrestleMania V =

1989 World Wrestling Federation pay-per-view event

- Promotional poster featuring Randy Savage and Hulk Hogan
- Promotion: World Wrestling Federation
- Date: April 2, 1989
- City: Atlantic City, New Jersey
- Venue: Historic Atlantic City Convention Hall (Promoted as Trump Plaza)
- Attendance: 18,946
- Tagline: The Mega Powers Explode

Pay-per-view chronology
| ← Previous; Royal Rumble | Next → SummerSlam |

WrestleMania chronology
| ← Previous; IV | Next → VI |

WrestleMania V was a 1989 professional wrestling pay-per-view (PPV) produced by the World Wrestling Federation (WWF, renamed WWE in 2002). It was the fifth annual WrestleMania and took place on April 2, 1989, at the Historic Atlantic City Convention Hall (promoted as Trump Plaza) in Atlantic City, New Jersey (Note: The venue was referred to as the Trump Plaza during the broadcast.) for a second consecutive year. WrestleMania V went head-to-head against Clash of the Champions VI, a television special by rival company World Championship Wrestling.

A total of 14 matches were contested at the event. The main event was Hulk Hogan versus Randy Savage for the WWF World Heavyweight Championship, billed as "the Mega Powers Explode", which Hogan won after a leg drop. Miss Elizabeth was at ringside in a neutral corner for the first half of the main event before the referee sent her to the locker room area. The undercard included matches pitting "Ravishing" Rick Rude against Ultimate Warrior for the WWF Intercontinental Heavyweight Championship, the Hart Foundation (Bret Hart and Jim Neidhart) against Greg Valentine and The Honky Tonk Man, and Demolition (Ax and Smash) against the Powers of Pain (The Warlord and The Barbarian) and Mr. Fuji in a handicap match for the WWF Tag Team Championship.

Retrospective reviews for WrestleMania V have been mixed. While the main event between Hogan and Savage was positively reviewed, criticism was levelled at the number of matches and their general level of quality.

== Production ==
=== Background ===
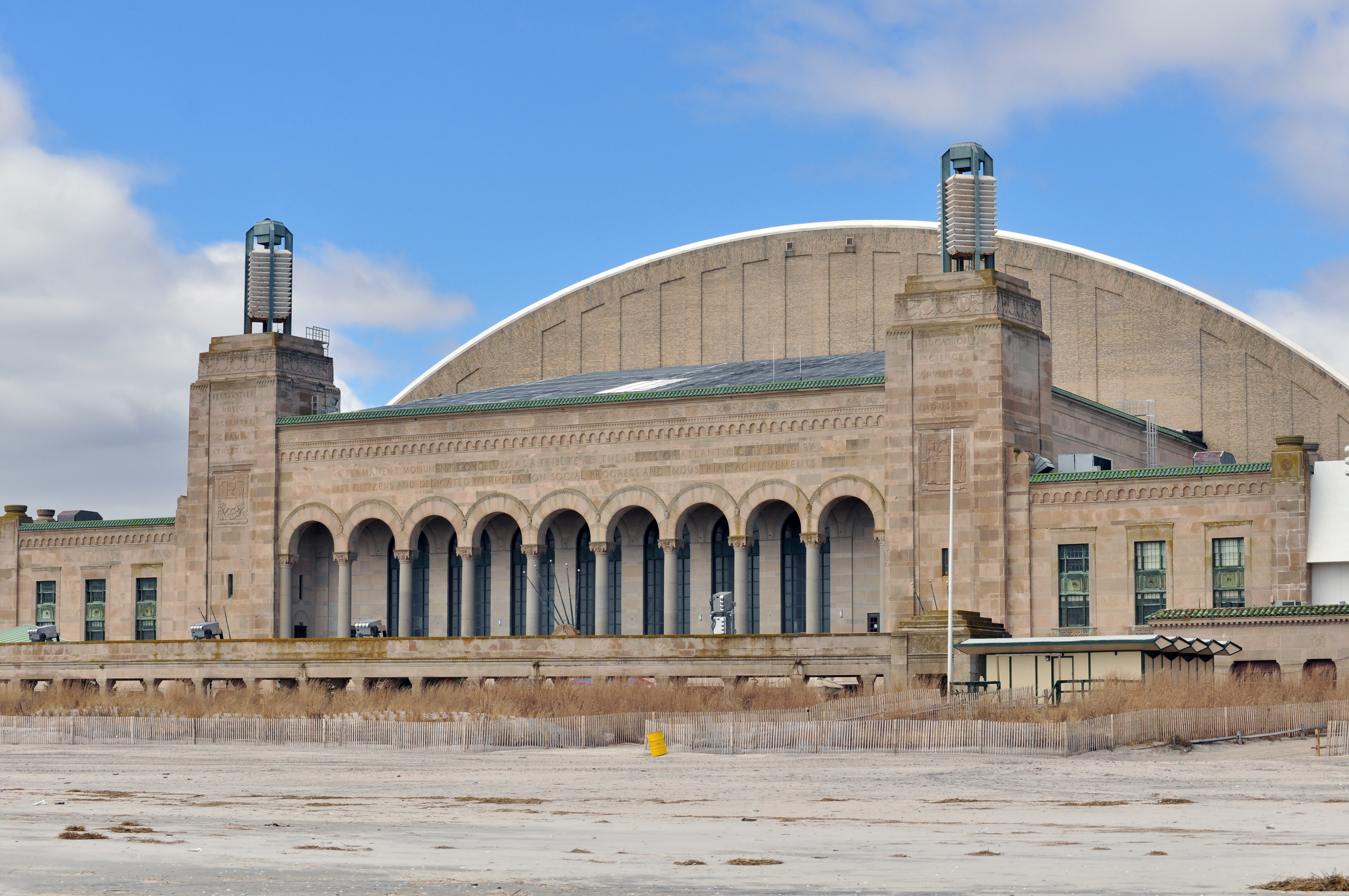
The fifth annual WrestleMania was held at the Historic Atlantic City Convention Hall in Atlantic City, New Jersey for a second consecutive year, but like WrestleMania IV, it was advertised as being held at the Trump Plaza.

WrestleMania is considered the World Wrestling Federation's (WWF, renamed WWE in 2002) flagship professional wrestling pay-per-view (PPV) event, having first been held in 1985. It is held annually between mid-March to mid-April. Following the advent of Survivor Series in 1987 and then Royal Rumble and SummerSlam in 1988—WWF's four original annual PPVs—the four would be referred to as the "Big Four". WrestleMania V was scheduled to be held on April 2, 1989, at the Historic Atlantic City Convention Hall in Atlantic City, New Jersey for a second consecutive year. This event, along with the previous year's WrestleMania IV, was advertised as being held at the Trump Plaza Hotel and Casino, with both events taking place next door at Convention Hall, but sponsored by Donald Trump. The two events were the first time that WrestleMania was held at the same venue for two consecutive years, and would not happen again until 2025 and 2026 where WrestleMania 41, and WrestleMania 42 took place at Allegiant Stadium in Paradise, Nevada in the Las Vegas area. Run-DMC performed a "WrestleMania Rap" for the audience. Other celebrity guests in attendance included Donald Trump and Morton Downey Jr.

=== Storylines ===
==== The Mega Powers Explode ====
The main feud heading into WrestleMania was between Hulk Hogan, and Randy Savage, who for most of the previous year were a unified team that referred to themselves as the Mega Powers.

The unit began forming after Savage wrestled The Honky Tonk Man for his WWF Intercontinental Heavyweight Championship on the October 3, 1987 episode of Saturday Night's Main Event. After the match, which Savage won by disqualification, Honky Tonk Man enlisted the help of Bret Hart and Jim Neidhart in attacking Savage. As Honky was ready to strike Savage with his guitar, Savage's valet Miss Elizabeth came back to ringside accompanied by then-reigning WWF World Heavyweight Champion Hogan, who helped Savage even the odds.

Later, Hogan faced Andre the Giant in a rematch of their championship bout from WrestleMania III on the premiere episode of WWF The Main Event, which was broadcast live on February 5, 1988, in Indianapolis. With help from Ted DiBiase, and a crooked official, Andre dethroned Hogan as champion and immediately surrendered the title to DiBiase as repayment for his assistance. After the contest, Andre's victory was upheld due to WWF referees' decisions being regarded as final. Still, the WWF World Heavyweight Championship was declared vacant as Andre was not permitted to surrender the title to another wrestler. Thus, a tournament was conceived for WrestleMania IV for the vacant title. Savage advanced to the finals and, with a little help from Hogan, won the tournament, and the championship by defeating DiBiase in the finals. Hogan celebrated with Savage afterward, cementing their union.

Throughout the rest of 1988, Hogan and Savage feuded with many heel tag teams, such as the Mega Bucks team of DiBiase and Andre, and the Twin Towers, consisting of Akeem and Big Boss Man. Things slowly began to change as 1989 began, however. Hogan had requested that Elizabeth accompany him to the ring for several of his matches in addition to her duties as Savage's valet. This led to several occasions where Elizabeth was placed in harm's way, which did not sit well with Savage. A sign that tensions were beginning to mount came when Savage picked up Boss Man's nightstick after a match with Akeem and glared at Hogan while he had his back turned, posing as he often did for the crowd.

On the January 7, 1989 episode of Saturday Night's Main Event, Savage came out and cleared the ring with a steel chair after Hogan was receiving a post-match beating from the Twin Towers, and Akeem and Boss Man began threatening Elizabeth, Boss Man going so far as to grab Elizabeth's wrist. Savage did not bother to check on the injured Hogan, however, and left the ring. Elizabeth assisted Hogan backstage, which again angered Savage. This led to a confrontation between Savage and Elizabeth, but nothing came of it. Later in January during the Royal Rumble match, Hogan accidentally eliminated Savage as he was trying to eliminate Bad News Brown.

Finally, on February 2 at The Main Event II, the tensions between Hogan and Savage boiled over. Once again, the Mega Powers and Twin Towers squared off. During a key point in the match, Akeem threw Savage through the ropes, causing him to land on Elizabeth. Hogan, distraught, picked her up and carried her backstage to the trainers' room where he waited while she regained consciousness. Savage, meanwhile, was forced to take on Boss Man and Akeem alone until Hogan, at the behest of Elizabeth, came back out several minutes later. When Hogan went to tag into the match, Savage slapped him in the face and left the ring. Hogan managed to record the victory for the Mega Powers, but things were not over yet.

Immediately upon the conclusion of the match, Hogan returned to the trainers' room where an angry Savage was waiting for him. The two got into a loud and physical confrontation, where Savage blamed Hogan for what happened to Elizabeth and accused him of being jealous of his championship reign. He also accused Hogan of only being his partner because he was lusting after Elizabeth. Hogan tried to calm the irate Macho Man down, but Savage had heard enough and struck Hogan with the title belt, knocking him to the floor. After punching the downed Hogan twice, Savage grabbed the belt again as Elizabeth went to check on Hogan. Savage grabbed her and threw her across the room, but before he could strike Hogan a second time, Brutus Beefcake came into the room and grabbed the belt from him. Savage eventually left the room, but not before assaulting Beefcake and the WWF officials who were dispatched to defuse the situation and tend to the injured Hogan.

Hogan then issued the challenge to Savage for what he still considered to be rightfully his, and Savage agreed to defend the WWF World Heavyweight Championship against him at WrestleMania. However, he would do so alone, as Elizabeth declined to be in his corner for the match; instead, she opted to be at ringside but in a neutral corner.

==== Other feuds ====
The second main feud heading into WrestleMania was between Rick Rude and Ultimate Warrior over the WWF Intercontinental Heavyweight Championship. Rude and Warrior were booked to face each other in a "Super Posedown" at Royal Rumble in January 1989. The winner had to be decided by a fan reaction, where Warrior won the posedown. After the posedown, an angry Rude attacked Warrior. This led to a feud between the two and an Intercontinental Heavyweight Championship match at WrestleMania.

The other main match on the undercard was Demolition (Ax and Smash) versus the Powers of Pain (The Barbarian and The Warlord), and Mr. Fuji in a handicap match for the WWF Tag Team Championship. Demolition was a dominant heel tag team since its debut in early 1987. They defeated Strike Force (Tito Santana and Rick Martel) for the titles at WrestleMania IV. They had a successful feud with the Hart Foundation during their early reign. In the summer of 1988, a powerhouse babyface tag team The Powers of Pain were brought into the WWF by Santana after Demolition injured Martel. The Powers feuded with Demolition over the tag titles, acting as mercenaries to avenge both the title loss and Martel's injury. At Survivor Series, Demolition's manager Mr. Fuji turned on them after causing them to lose their Survivor Series match, culminating in a double turn as Demolition turned babyfaces and Powers of Pain turned heels. Powers of Pain made Mr. Fuji their manager, leading to their WrestleMania encounter with Demolition for the tag titles in a handicap match. Martel meanwhile returned from his injury at the 1989 Royal Rumble and was scheduled to reunite with Santana at WrestleMania.

Jake "the Snake" Roberts and André the Giant began their feud in the fall of 1988 after André interfered in one of Roberts' matches against Rude. When Roberts retrieved his snake, Damien, from his bag, André became distressed, then petrified at the sight of the snake. When it became apparent André was deathly afraid of the snake, Roberts threw the snake onto André, causing him to collapse to the mat and pass out from a (kayfabe) heart attack. André recovered and swore revenge. Meanwhile, Andre's longtime adversary, Big John Studd returned to the WWF in late 1988, rejected a "welcome back" from longtime manager Bobby Heenan and, in becoming a face, said he was coming after André. The André-Roberts feud, meanwhile, continued into early 1989, and eventually, Studd agreed to become the special guest referee for their match at WrestleMania.

Shortly after Terry Taylor joined the WWF in the summer of 1988, he was packaged as "The Red Rooster" and, paired with Heenan as his manager, given a novice wrestler gimmick, someone who could not navigate his way through matches without constant instructions from Heenan. Eventually, the Red Rooster grew tired of Heenan's demeaning style of coaching and turned against him, becoming a face. Shortly thereafter, on an episode of WWF Prime Time Wrestling, Heenan claimed to want to break off their relationship amicably, but it was a ruse to set Rooster up to be ambushed by Heenan's new protégé, long-time enhancement talent Steve Lombardi, who had just been reinvented as The Brooklyn Brawler.

== Event ==
Other on-screen personnel
| Role: | Name: |
|---|---|
| Commentator | Gorilla Monsoon |
| Commentator | Jesse Ventura |
| Interviewer | Gene Okerlund |
| Interviewer | Tony Schiavone |
| Interviewer | Sean Mooney |
| Ring announcer | Howard Finkel |
| Referees | Joey Marella |
| Referees | Earl Hebner |
| Referees | Dave Hebner |
| Referees | Tim White |
| Referees | Freddie Sparta |

=== Preliminary matches ===
WWF Women's Champion Rockin' Robin opened the show by performing "America the Beautiful".

The first match at WrestleMania V was between Hercules and King Haku. Haku attacked from behind to start, but Hercules used some power moves to get the advantage before he clotheslined Haku, sending him to the floor. He suplexed Haku in the ring, and hit him a series of elbow drops. After dominating Haku, Hercules focused his attention on Haku's (and his own former) manager Bobby Heenan. Haku nailed Hercules from behind, and hit him with two backbreakers for a near-fall. Hercules avoided a diving splash by Haku and hit him with a knee lift. He hit a series of clotheslines, and powerslammed Haku for a near-fall. He attempted a top rope maneuver, but when he came down, Haku caught him with a savate kick. Hercules fell in the corner, and Haku tried to open the middle rope as Hercules rolled away. Hercules ducked a clothesline and hit Haku with a bridging belly to back suplex to win the match.

The second match was a tag team match between The Twin Towers (Akeem and Big Boss Man) and the Rockers (Shawn Michaels and Marty Jannetty). Bossman slapped Michaels in the corner and turned around to look at Jannetty, but when he turned back, Michaels hit him with a missile dropkick. He hit Akeem and Boss Man with flying forearms before Bossman tagged in Akeem. The Rockers worked on Akeem's arm before he powered out and tagged Bossman. Jannetty tagged in and was hit with a leapfrog. Twin Towers took turns and beat Jannetty. He avoided a big splash by Akeem and tagged Michaels. Rockers hit Akeem with Double Flying Fists and Michaels tried a near-fall on Akeem. Akeem hit Michaels a lariat. Boss Man tagged in and tried to hit a corner body splash on Michaels, but he sidestepped, getting a near-fall. They hit Akeem with a double dropkick and they hit Boss Man with a double missile dropkick. Akeem tagged in and dumped Jannetty. Michaels came off the top on Akeem, but Boss Man powerbombed him. Akeem took advantage and hit Michaels with an Air Africa and pinned him to win the match.

The third match was a non-title match between Brutus Beefcake and "The Million Dollar Man" Ted DiBiase, the self-proclaimed Million Dollar Champion. Before the match, DiBiase was glad-handed with event sponsor Donald Trump, who was in attendance in the front row. Beefcake knocked DiBiase out on the floor before getting back into the ring. He pounded on DiBiase, but Virgil caught Beefcake's foot. DiBiase hit him a clothesline and applied a chokehold on Beefcake, and followed it up with a "Million Dollar Drop" for a near-fall. He hit a middle rope diving back elbow drop on Beefcake for another near-fall. DiBiase hit him an Irish whip and had an inside cradle pinfall attempt on Beefcake. He tried to hit a vertical suplex on Beefcake, but Beefcake countered it into a hanging suplex. DiBiase applied a "Million Dollar Dream" on Beefcake, who grabbed the ropes. He slammed DiBiase's face in the corner and applied a "Barber's Chair" on DiBiase. Virgil hopped up on the apron, distracting Beefcake. Beefcake released DiBiase from the hold and went after Virgil. DiBiase nailed Beefcake from behind to the floor. The referee was busy with DiBiase while Virgil pounded on Beefcake, but Beefcake no-sold and chased Virgil. DiBiase came from behind and nailed Beefcake. The two brawled outside the ring and were counted out, resulting in a no contest. They continued to beat each other.

The fourth match was a tag team match between The Bushwhackers (Bushwhacker Luke and Bushwhacker Butch) and the Fabulous Rougeaus (Jacques Rougeau and Raymond Rougeau). The Bushwhackers grabbed Rougeaus' manager Jimmy Hart's jacket, but Rougeaus caught them and went on the attack. Luke and Raymond began the match and Luke missed a fist drop on Raymond, but Luke and Butch hit him a battering ram. Luke made the cover, but Jacques came in, and accidentally hit a knee drop on Raymond as he was going to hit Luke, but Luke sidestepped. Rougeaus double-teamed Luke for a while as the referee was busy with Butch. They kicked Luke in the gut and then celebrated. They celebrated too much that Bushwhackers hit Raymond with a battering ram and a rib breaker. Luke then pinned Raymond to win the match.

The fifth match was between Mr. Perfect and The Blue Blazer. Perfect beat on Blazer until Blazer flipped out of a hip toss. Blazer hit some moves on Perfect and went for a split-legged moonsault on Perfect, who hit Blazer with his knees. He applied a chinlock on Blazer, but Blazer escaped and hit Perfect with a boot to the head. He followed it up with a powerslam and a belly to belly suplex for near-falls. He busted out of a crucifix and got another near-fall and then he began arguing with the referee. This helped Perfect to connect with a forearm club and a Perfectplex pinfall for the victory.

The sixth match was a WWF Tag Team Championship handicap match between Demolition (Ax and Smash) and the Powers of Pain (The Warlord and The Barbarian) and their manager Mr. Fuji (himself a former WWF Tag Team Champion). In the beginning, Ax and Smash pounded on Warlord until Warlord backed Smash into their corner and tagged Barbarian. Smash fought back and tagged in Ax, who locked in a hammerlock on Barbarian. Fuji tagged in and hit a chop on Ax followed by a diving headbutt to the groin. He tagged in Warlord, who increased Ax's damage. Fuji tagged in and missed a Fuji Drop. Warlord cut Ax's tag with Smash but was hit with a forearm club by Ax. Ax tagged in Smash. Ax dumped Barbarian while Smash beat up on Warlord. Mr. Fuji tried to throw salt previously hidden in his tights into Smash's eyes, but Smash ducked and Fuji accidentally threw salt into Warlord's eyes. Demolition then grabbed Fuji and hit him with the "Demolition Decapitation" and Ax pinned Fuji to win the match and retain the titles.

The seventh match was between "The World's Strongest Man" Dino Bravo, and "Rugged" Ronnie Garvin. Bravo hit a series of forearm smashes in Garvin's back and applied a bearhug. Bravo threw him in the corner and hit him with a series of shoulder blocks. Garvin smashed Bravo's head in the turnbuckles a few times for a near-fall. He followed it up with a sleeper hold on Bravo, but Bravo grabbed the ropes. Garvin tried to hit a piledriver. Bravo went for a back body drop, but Garvin held on for a sunset flip pin for a near-fall. Garvin took him to the corner and went for ten-count-corner punches. Bravo countered with an inverted atomic drop and a sidewalk slam, followed by a pinfall victory. After the match, Bravo's manager Frenchy Martin attacked Garvin but received a "Garvin Stomp" for his troubles.

The eighth match was a tag team match between the Brain Busters (Arn Anderson and Tully Blanchard), with Bobby Heenan in their corner, and Strike Force (Tito Santana and Rick Martel). Martel and Blanchard fought out before Anderson hit Martel with his knee in the back. Brain Busters tried to double-team him, but he fought out of their corner. Strike Force hit Brain Busters with dropkicks, sending them to the floor. Back in the ring, Anderson was hit with an Irish whip and then he received a rolling spinebuster for a near-fall. Anderson went for a body scissors on Martel, but Martel turned it into a Boston crab. Blanchard interfered and hit Martel with an eye rake. Blanchard tagged in while Santana grabbed Martel receiving a blind tag. He hit Blanchard with a bulldog and then slapped in a figure four leglock. Martel also applied the figure four leglock on Anderson. Santana got a near-fall with a back slide on Blanchard. He went to the top rope and hit a flying forearm smash on Blanchard. Blanchard ducked and Santana accidentally hit Martel. Brain Busters took advantage and double-teamed Santana. He fought out and crawled to tag Martel, but he refused and walked away, turning heel. Anderson and Blanchard hit Santana with a spike piledriver. Anderson got a pin on Santana, getting the victory, and breaking up Strike Force.

Next was a Piper's Pit segment with Morton Downey Jr. as the guest. Before "Rowdy" Roddy Piper could interview Morton, Brother Love came out dressed as Piper and impersonated him. The real Piper then came out and got rid of Brother Love by ripping Brother Love's kilt off. After Morton blew constant smoke from his cigarette into Piper's face during the interview (despite Piper's repeated requests not to), Piper put out the cigarette and Morton with a fire extinguisher.

The ninth match was between Jake "the Snake" Roberts and André the Giant (with Bobby Heenan), with Big John Studd as the Special Guest Referee. Studd and André were longtime enemies and spent a great deal of time jawing back and forth at each other. As Roberts was making his way down to the ring, behind Studd's back, André had discretely removed one of the top turnbuckle pads exposing the steel ring underneath. André started the match by grabbing Roberts as he rolled into the ring and ran his head into the exposed steel turnbuckle. He then pounded on Roberts until Roberts fought back and went on the attack. André got tied up in the ropes and Roberts took full advantage and got his snake Damien (in the storyline, André was deathly afraid of snakes though in reality he had some snakes as pets on his ranch) and attempted to throw him on a struggling and terrified André, but Studd stopped Roberts. André took advantage to break free of the ropes and applied a chokehold on Roberts. He went for a shoulder block on Roberts in the corner, but accidentally hit a headbutt on the turnbuckle pad. Roberts hit André with a knee lift and drove him into the exposed turnbuckle. André chopped Roberts on the floor and knocked him on the apron before having a confrontation with Studd. Ted DiBiase and Virgil came out and attempted to steal Damien, but Roberts got Damien back. In the ring, André hit Studd with a cheap shot from behind and began to choke Studd with the strap of his tights, thus getting disqualified. Despite having won the match, Roberts tossed Damien in the ring to save Studd from André, who hightailed it out of the ring to get away from the snake.

The tenth match was a tag team match between the Hart Foundation (Bret "Hitman" Hart" and Jim "the Anvil" Neidhart) and Greg Valentine, and The Honky Tonk Man (with manager Jimmy Hart). Neidhart hit Valentine with a slingshot shoulder block for a near-fall. Honky tagged in but got nailed by Neidhart. Hart tagged in and connected with a backbreaker on Honky, but missed a double axe handle middle rope elbow drop. Honky had the match won as he hit Hart with a Shake, Rattle N' Roll, but he tagged in Valentine instead of pinning Hart. Valentine slapped in the figure four leglock on Hart. Hart crawled out of it, but then he received a Gutbuster by Honky. Hart managed to hit a flying crossbody on Honky. Valentine tagged in and blocked a roll-up by Hart. Hart rolled out and tagged Neidhart. Neidhart dropkicked both Valentine and Honky and then hit Valentine with a shoulder block and made a cover. Honky made the save. A lariat on Valentine got another near-fall for Neidhart. Hart and Honky tagged in. Valentine ran in and nailed Neidhart on the apron. The referee was busy taking out Valentine. Neidhart took advantage and handed Bret Hart, Jimmy Hart's megaphone. Hart knocked Honky with it and pinned him to win the matchup.

The eleventh match was a WWF Intercontinental Championship match between defending champion Ultimate Warrior and "Ravishing" Rick Rude with Bobby Heenan in his corner. As the Warrior was doing his usual running entrance, Rude tried to jump-start the match by attempting a knee to the Warrior's stomach, only to find that the Warrior was still wearing the Intercontinental belt and hurt his knee with no effect on the champion. Warrior then shoved Rude into the corner 3 times from mid-ring before slapping on a bearhug. Rude hit a missile dropkick on Warrior and went for a cover, but Warrior no-sold and grabbed a second bearhug on Rude. Rude bit him, but Warrior hit him with a back body drop. He went for a Warrior Splash but Rude hit his knees on Warrior. Rude followed with a back to belly piledriver, and got a near-fall on the champion. Rude hit a jawbreaker on Warrior and clotheslined him for a near-fall. He hit Warrior with a Russian legsweep and got another near-fall. Rude hooked on a Mexican surfboard, but Warrior grabbed the ropes. He powered out; hitting Rude with a running shoulder block. He delivered Rude a backbreaker and tried to lift him, but dropped him clumsily in the ropes. Warrior hit Rude a series of Irish whips in every corner. He missed a Warrior Splash. Rude went for a Rude Awakening, but Warrior powered out and clotheslined Rude to the apron. He tried to suplex him back into the ring, but just before he completed the move, Bobby Heenan pulled Warrior's leg out from under him, which caused Rude to fall on top of the champion, and held onto it so the weakened Warrior could not escape as Rude pinned him. Rude won the match and became the new WWF Intercontinental Champion in what was Warrior's first pinfall loss in the WWF. Following the match, an enraged Warrior chased Heenan around and into the ring and hit him with a gorilla press drop.

The twelfth match was between "Hacksaw" Jim Duggan and Bad News Brown. The powerhouse Brown dominated Duggan in the early goings but missed a charge in the corner. Duggan hit him with a series of punches. Brown hit Duggan with an Irish whip and smashed his head into the turnbuckles, but Duggan no-sold. Duggan hit Brown with a series of shoulder blocks before getting slugged. They went to the floor where Duggan was whipped shoulder-first into the ring post. Brown hit Duggan a "Ghetto Blaster", but Duggan avoided it and instead hit his three-point stance clothesline. Brown fell to the floor and tossed a chair into the ring. Meanwhile, Duggan got his 2x4. They both hit each other with foreign objects, ending the match in a double disqualification.

The thirteenth match and the final match on the undercard was between Red Rooster and his former manager Bobby "The Brain" Heenan in a rare in-ring appearance as a wrestler. Accompanying Heenan to the ring was the Brooklyn Brawler. As the match began, Heenan (still favoring his ribs due to his prior run-in with Ultimate Warrior), immediately covered on Rooster but failed. Rooster tried to hit Heenan with an Irish whip, but Heenan reversed it into his own. He missed a charge on Rooster and ran shoulder-first into the ring post. Rooster pinned him and won the match in just thirty-one seconds. After the match, Rooster was attacked by the Brawler, but this had little effect on the Rooster, who soon got the upper hand and chased the Brawler from the ring.

=== Main event ===
Randy Savage versus Hulk Hogan for the WWF World Heavyweight Championship

The main event was for the WWF World Heavyweight Championship between defending champion "Macho Man" Randy Savage and Hulk Hogan with their manager Miss Elizabeth in a neutral corner. The match was billed as "The Mega Powers Explode". Hogan hit Savage with a shoulder block to send him out to the floor. Savage returned to the ring and applied a headlock on Hogan before pounding him in the face. Hogan shoved Savage again, but Savage grabbed him and went to the floor. Hogan chased Savage around the ringside before Savage hid behind Miss Elizabeth. Savage went back into the ring and began taunting Hogan. Hogan applied a headlock and hit Savage with a drop toe hold. He slapped a front facelock on Savage, which Savage countered into a back suplex. The champion hit a double axe handle from the top rope on Hogan for a near-fall. Savage applied an armbar on Hogan until Hogan yanked Savage out to the floor. Hogan threw Savage back in the ring and smashed him in the turnbuckle and followed with a running clothesline, a series of elbow drops and a big boot. He received an Irish whip and a clothesline by Savage. Savage got a near-fall. Savage hooked on a chinlock on Hogan until Hogan hit his elbow and hit Savage with an atomic drop, but missed an elbow drop. Savage took advantage and hit Hogan with a knee in the corner. Savage hit him with Irish whips in every corner before he began posing. Hogan hit Savage with a series of punches and a corner clothesline, sending him out. Elizabeth checked on Savage, but he pushed her away. Hogan lifted Savage in the shoulder and tried to ram him in the ring post, but Elizabeth prevented Hogan from doing this. Savage took advantage slipped off and rammed Hogan into the ring post. The referee Dave Hebner then sent Elizabeth backstage. As Hogan was getting up, Savage hit him with a diving double axe handle. Savage hit Hogan with a hotshot. He drove his elbow into Hogan's throat on the apron, damaging Hogan's throat. Savage hit a knee drop on Hogan, getting a near-fall. He went to the top rope and hit a diving elbow drop. He made a pinfall attempt on Hogan, but Hogan hulked up, and hit Savage with punches, a big boot, and a leg drop for the victory and his second WWF World Heavyweight Championship.

== Reception ==
WrestleMania V has retrospectively garnered mixed reviews. Whilst the Hogan-Savage main event has been remembered fondly, many reviewers referred to the event as a 'one-match show', bemoaning the number of short, low-quality matches throughout the event with few exceptions. Kevin Pantoja, writing for 411Mania, ranked it in the middle of the first five WrestleManias, describing it as "better in the ring than most", though failing to wow him in most other departments. Whilst positive towards the main event, particularly praising Savage as "firing on all cylinders", he described a significant amount of the card as "really bad stuff".

Writing for TJRWrestling, John Canton had similar thoughts, with high praise towards the main event, noting it's "epic feel", stating Hogan did a great job at selling and "making Savage look credible". Conversely, he generally panned a significant amount of the card. Especially, he noted the Rooster/Heenan and Andre/Roberts bouts as "DUDS", stating for the former "At least it was short", and for the latter bemoaned the decision to place Andre in "a singles match that went nearly 10 minutes... he was obviously done at this point." He did, however, state that the tag match between the Hart Foundation and Honky Tonk Man/Valentine was "pretty good" and "carried by the great Bret Hart", and also giving kudos towards the Intercontinental match as being "a better match then I remembered." Overall, he gave the show a score of 4 out of 10, stating that the main event was "the only thing worth remembering", closing his review with underlining Wrestlemania V as "a bad show".

Bryan Rose, writing for Voices of Wrestling, specifically criticized the crowd, alongside the location as the reason he was unsure "what this crowd was here to see besides Hulk Hogan." Like others, he generally praised the main event as a "great, dramatic match" where "every move meant something". He also gave props to the Brainbusters vs. Strike Force encounter, highlighting Strike Force's performances and calling the match "pretty good". However, he heavily panned the rest of the card, especially The Fabulous Rougeau Brothers vs. The Bushwackers, which he scored minus two stars. He bemoaned the performances of the wrestlers, especially the Bushwackers, ultimately declaring "terrible doesn't do this match justice" and joking describing it as "the worst Wrestlemania match ever award up until this point".

== Aftermath ==
Hulk Hogan continued his feud with Randy Savage. WWF financed a movie in 1989 titled No Holds Barred, which starred Hogan as the lead character Rip, and Tom Lister, Jr. acted as the villain Zeus. In the movie, Rip defeats Zeus. This movie led to a feud between Hogan and Zeus in the WWF because Zeus wanted to take revenge on Hogan of the movie in real-life. He was billed in the WWF as Zeus and he allied with Savage. Hogan's best friend Brutus Beefcake joined him in the war. This led to a tag team main event at SummerSlam, where Hogan and Beefcake defeated Zeus and Savage. The rivalry continued until the No Holds Barred pay-per-view, where Hogan and Beefcake beat Zeus and Savage in a steel cage match, thus ending the rivalry with Zeus. After the No Holds Barred cage match, Randy Savage and Hulk Hogan would meet one last time in a WrestleMania V rematch for the WWF World Heavyweight Championship on The Main Event III. The pinfall was counted by new heavyweight boxing champion Buster Douglas, who then punched Savage out post-match after Savage slapped Douglas in the face.

Savage, meanwhile, found a new manager. After the WrestleMania broadcast went off the air, Gene Okerlund attempted to interview Miss Elizabeth. Sensational Sherri interrupted the interview along with Savage, which caused Hogan to get involved and fall victim to a steel chair shot from the dethroned champion. From then on until WrestleMania VII, Sherri served as Savage's manager, and after Savage defeated Hacksaw Jim Duggan to become King of the Ring in September 1989, she became known as Sensational Queen Sherri.

Rick Rude defended his Intercontinental Championship primarily against Ultimate Warrior, but also against other faces such as Hacksaw Jim Duggan and Jimmy Snuka. Later in the summer of 1989, Rude began badmouthing Roddy Piper, and Piper would play a key role in Rude's eventual title loss back to Ultimate Warrior.

With a successful Tag Team Championship defense, Demolition moved on to new feuds with The Twin Towers (Akeem and Big Boss Man) and the Brain Busters (Arn Anderson and Tully Blanchard). Demolition would eventually lose the titles to Anderson and Blanchard on Saturday Night's Main Event XXII (taped July 18, 1989), following interference from André the Giant; Demolition's reign was 478 days, which remains the longest uninterrupted reign in the history of the classic WWF World Tag Team Championship, which was decommissioned in 2010. (The previous 370-day record of the Valiant Brothers was eclipsed on the actual day of Wrestlemania V.) It was also the longest reign with any tag team championship in WWWF/WWF/WWE history until the record was broken in 2016 by WWE Raw Tag Team Champions The New Day. Meanwhile, the Powers of Pain would lose their push and eventually settle into mid-card matches, feuding with teams such as The Bushwhackers and The Rockers until they were eventually split up in early 1990.

Rick Martel, having turned heel two matches after his former tormentors Demolition won their feud with his avengers the Powers of Pain, broke up Strike Force and feuded with now former partner Tito Santana. Martel and fellow French Canadians the Fabulous Rougeaus (Jacques Rougeau and Raymond Rougeau) defeated Santana and The Rockers (Marty Jannetty and Shawn Michaels) at SummerSlam. Martel eventually transformed into "The Model" during a feud with Brutus Beefcake that fall.

== Home media and streaming ==
The event was released on VHS by Coliseum Video in the United States in 1989 and by Silver Vision in the United Kingdom in December 1991. The video was co-produced by Tony Schiavone and includes interviews that weren't originally broadcast. In the UK, the British Board of Film Classification insisted that cuts were made for it to be passed with a P.G. rating.

Mail order customers in the USA received a free commemorative watch with purchases of the tape.

It was re-released on DVD in the United Kingdom in April 2005 as part of Silver Vision's Tagged Classics range, and was paired with WrestleMania VI. This DVD set was not released in the USA.

In 2014, the event was included on the WWE's streaming platform the WWE Network as part of its launch and remained on the service until the platform closed in 2026. As of October 2026, subscribers in multiple territories, including the US, Canada and the UK, can stream the event on Netflix, thanks to the WWE's ten-year agreement with the company.

== Results ==
| No. | Results | Stipulations | Times |
|---|---|---|---|
| 1 | Hercules defeated King Haku (with Bobby Heenan) | Singles match | 6:57 |
| 2 | The Twin Towers (Akeem and Big Boss Man) (with Slick) defeated The Rockers (Shawn Michaels and Marty Jannetty) | Tag team match | 8:02 |
| 3 | Brutus Beefcake vs. Ted DiBiase (with Virgil) ended in a double countout | Singles match | 10:01 |
| 4 | The Bushwhackers (Bushwhacker Luke and Bushwhacker Butch) defeated the Fabulous Rougeaus (Jacques Rougeau and Raymond Rougeau) (with Jimmy Hart) | Tag team match | 5:23 |
| 5 | Mr. Perfect defeated The Blue Blazer | Singles match | 5:38 |
| 6 | Demolition (Ax and Smash) (c) defeated the Powers of Pain (The Warlord and The Barbarian) and Mr. Fuji | Handicap match for the WWF Tag Team Championship | 8:20 |
| 7 | Dino Bravo (with Frenchy Martin) defeated Ronnie Garvin | Singles match | 3:06 |
| 8 | The Brain Busters (Arn Anderson and Tully Blanchard) (with Bobby Heenan) defeated Strike Force (Tito Santana and Rick Martel) | Tag team match | 9:17 |
| 9 | Jake Roberts defeated André the Giant (with Bobby Heenan) by disqualification | Singles match with Big John Studd as special guest referee | 9:44 |
| 10 | The Hart Foundation (Bret Hart and Jim Neidhart) defeated Greg Valentine and The Honky Tonk Man (with Jimmy Hart) | Tag team match | 7:40 |
| 11 | Rick Rude (with Bobby Heenan) defeated Ultimate Warrior (c) | Singles match for the WWF Intercontinental Championship | 9:36 |
| 12 | Bad News Brown vs. Jim Duggan ended in a double disqualification | Singles match | 3:49 |
| 13 | Red Rooster defeated Bobby Heenan (with Brooklyn Brawler) | Singles match | 0:31 |
| 14 | Hulk Hogan defeated Randy Savage (c) (with Miss Elizabeth in a neutral corner) | Singles match for the WWF World Heavyweight Championship | 17:54 |
(c) / – the champion(s) heading into the match
