= The Warlord (wrestler) =

American professional wrestler (born 1962)

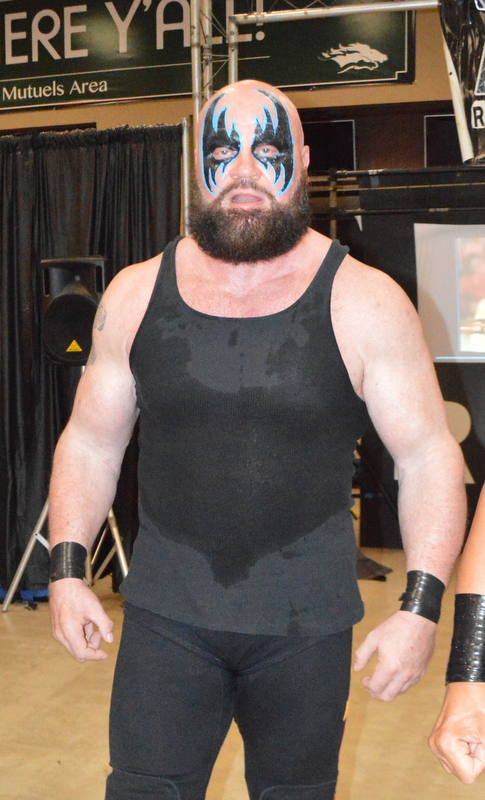
- The Warlord in 2016

Personal information
- Born: Terry Scott Szopinski; March 28, 1962 (age 64) Pompano Beach, Florida, U.S.

Professional wrestling career
- Ring name(s): Super Assassin #2; Violence Warlord; The Warlord
- Billed height: 6 ft 5 in (196 cm)
- Billed weight: 323 lb (147 kg)
- Billed from: "Parts unknown"
- Trained by: Eddie Sharkey; Rey Misterio Sr.
- Debut: 1986

Terry Scott Szopinski (born March 28, 1962) is an American professional wrestler. He is best known by his ring name The Warlord and for his tenures in Jim Crockett Promotions and the World Wrestling Federation (WWF) as one-half of the Powers of Pain alongside The Barbarian.

The Warlord's first national exposure was in the NWA territory Jim Crockett Promotions, where Powers of Pain held the World Six-Man Tag Team Championship until they departed the company in 1988 and joined the WWF, where they competed in the tag team division until the team was quietly split in 1990. Warlord then competed as a singles wrestler until departing in 1992 and had a small stint in World Championship Wrestling (WCW) in 1996, where he briefly reunited with The Barbarian as the Super Assassins.

== Professional wrestling career ==
=== Jim Crockett Promotions (1986–1988) ===
In 1986 while working out at a gym in Minnesota, Szopinski met its owner Joe Laurinaitis, better known as the professional wrestler Road Warrior Animal. After coming up with possible ring names with Sharkey and Animal, Szopinski adopted the "Warlord" as his ring name and sent some photos of his work to Dusty Rhodes. Soon afterwards, Rhodes hired him and he began wrestling for the National Wrestling Alliance's Jim Crockett Promotions later that year. After a brief stint in JCP, the territory's owner Jim Crockett Jr. sent him to the Kansas City-based Central States Wrestling territory for more training. While there, he teamed with Karl Kovac and won the NWA Central States Tag Team Championship on June 8, 1987, in a tournament. However, he and Kovac were soon stripped of the title when Kovac was fired and Szopinski travelled to Japan for more training.

In late 1987, Szopinski returned to Jim Crockett Promotions under his Warlord name and began teaming with Ivan Koloff with Paul Jones as their manager. In 1988, he then formed a permanent tag team with the Barbarian known as the "Powers of Pain", the heel counterparts to the Road Warriors, while retaining Jones as their manager.

While continuing to team with Koloff, The Powers of Pain feuded heavily with The Road Warriors, and defeated them and Dusty Rhodes for the NWA World Six-Man Tag Team Championship. To continue the feud, JCP management wanted them to do some scaffold matches against the Warriors, but this was met with opposition from Szopinski and Vailahi over fears of injury. As a result, they both left JCP and joined the World Wrestling Federation, vacating the six-man tag team title in the process.

=== World Wrestling Federation (1988–1992) ===
The Powers of Pain made their debut on June 18, 1988, as a replacement for Strike Force (Tito Santana and Rick Martel) in a WWF World Tag Team Championship match where they beat Demolition by countout. Their televised debut was filmed June 21 in Glens Falls and screened on the July 16 episode of Superstars where - having earlier in the night, in a dark match taped and later released on DVD, gained another countout win over Demolition when the champions walked out - they defeated enhancement talents Iron Mike Sharpe and Tony Ulysses. Although the Barbarian had already been wearing face paint in JCP, it was at this point that the Warlord began to also use face paint.

Upon their arrival, the Powers of Pain were faces managed by Santana. They feuded with Demolition who had defeated Strike Force for the title and then injured Martel (kayfabe). The Powers of Pain were introduced as mercenaries to help Martel and Santana gain revenge on Demolition for both the title loss and the injury to Martel. They had their first televised rivalry against The Bolsheviks (Nikolai Volkoff and Boris Zhukov). They defeated Bolsheviks in their pay-per-view debut at the inaugural SummerSlam, where they introduced their new manager The Baron. The Baron left the WWF in early November.

At Survivor Series, the Powers' team defeated Demolition's team in a tag team elimination match, with the Powers being the sole survivors of their team. Near the end of the match, Demolition's manager Mr. Fuji double-crossed them and after they beat him up and left, the Powers came to his aid, gaining Fuji as their manager in the process, in return for which his interference helped the Powers eliminate the last remaining opponents, the Conquistadors. Afterwards, the Powers and Fuji celebrated until Demolition returned and drove them from the ring. As a result, the Powers became villains while Demolition became fan favorites.

Following this, Demolition and the Powers (with Fuji now in their corner) engaged in a series of championship matches at house shows, typically ending in double disqualification or a narrow countout victory for the Powers. On December 12 episode of Prime Time Wrestling, Fuji was confirmed as the new manager of The Powers of Pain. On February 20 episode of Prime Time Wrestling, Powers of Pain received an opportunity for the Tag Team Championship against Demolition, which they lost via disqualification. In 1989, Szopinski entered the Royal Rumble as the twenty-first entrant, but lasted only two seconds before being eliminated by Hulk Hogan, setting the record for shortest time spent in a Royal Rumble match, although this record would be broken by Santino Marella at the Royal Rumble in 2009. At WrestleMania V, Powers of Pain and Mr. Fuji competed against Demolition for the title in a handicap match, where Demolition retained the title by pinning Fuji.

In March 1990, The Powers of Pain split, with Fuji selling Barbarian's contract to Bobby "The Brain" Heenan while selling Warlord's contract to Slick. After the team's split, Warlord received an attire change, where he abandoned his Road Warrior-like reverse mohawk and face paint in favor of a shaved head and a silver metallic Cyborg-style Phantom of the Opera-like half-mask and black armor. He also brought a metal staff topped with a W with him to his matches and used it as a weapon on occasion. He temporarily shaved his beard into a horseshoe moustache. He began a feud with the British Bulldog leading to a match at WrestleMania VII. He was granted a chance at the world title against Hulk Hogan on August 2, 1991, in which he was defeated. He then began a long-running series of matches with the Texas Tornado, which rarely had either man winning. However, he did manage to score a singles victory over a high-profile wrestler Jake Roberts on August 23, 1991. On April 17, 1992, Szopinski lost to Virgil in his final match for the WWF in Birmingham, England.

=== Various promotions (1992–1995) ===
After leaving the WWF for the independent circuit, Szopinski traveled to the Catch Wrestling Association and lost to CWA World Heavyweight Champion Rambo in the CWA Catch Cup 1992 on August 22, 1992, in Germany. He wrestled two additional times in the fall, losing to Rambo in a rematch and then falling to new champion Buffalo Peterson.

In April 1993 Szopinski traveled to another German promotion, World Wrestling Superstars and had considerable success as he dominated Butch Reed in multiple encounters. Throughout the year he appeared in multiple other promotions, including Herb Abrams' Universal Wrestling Federation, the World Wrestling Council, Extreme Championship Wrestling, and WAR. In 1994 Szopinski narrowed his focused to the Independent Wrestling Federation and WAR, participating in lengthy tours with both companies. On August 26, 1994, he teamed with Bob Backlund and Scott Putski to defeat Gedo, Hiromichi Fuyuki, and Jado and win the WAR Six-Man Tag Team Championship in an event held in Yokohama, Japan. They lost the titles days later in a rematch on September 1.

On September 23, 1994, the Powers of Pain reunited for the first time in over two years to compete for the vacant UWF Tag-Team Championship at UWF Blackjack Brawl. They were defeated by the Killer Bees. Szopinski and Vailahi continued their renewed partnership in 1995, traveling to the NWC where they faced the team Aerial Assault (Bobby Bradley and a young Rob Van Dam).

=== World Championship Wrestling (1995–1996) ===
On October 11, 1995, Warlord and Barbarian made their return to World Championship Wrestling. They were now dubbed the "Super Assassins", wrestled under masks, and were managed by Colonel Robert Parker. The Super Assassins were defeated by the Nasty Boys in their first match. Both wrestlers participated in the three-ring battle royal in the main event of WCW World War 3 on November 26. On December 16, they earned their first victory, defeating the State Patrol on WCW Worldwide. Their last match was on the January 1, 1996, edition of Monday Nitro where they fell to Lex Luger and Sting, after which the team was disbanded.

=== Injury; retirement (1996–2003) ===
The Warlord was forced to retire from wrestling due to suffering neck injuries in a car accident involving a Pizza Hut delivery van in 1996. The accident caused significant life-altering injuries, including nerve damage that left one side of his body permanently disfigured.

Warlord returned for one match teaming with Typhoon as they lost to the Harris Twins at Key West, Florida for Wrestling International Pro on May 31, 1997.

After attempting a comeback in 2001, Szopinski was sidelined yet again after suffering severe leg damage in a motorcycle accident. During his recovery, he retired from wrestling and began training as a security guard and started providing his services for Relief Group International, an auto relief group. He soon extended his services into bodyguarding, and worked alongside celebrities such as 50 Cent, Thomas Jones and Kimbo Slice, who nicknamed Szopinski the "Wall".

=== Late career (2003–present) ===
On January 10, 2003, Szopinski made his first wrestling-related appearance in years as he acted as a special guest referee for Hardkore Championship Wrestling in a match between Christian York and Reckless Youth, which Youth won. On January 25, he made his official in-ring return under his Warlord name and character as he defeated Joe Gomez.

After wrestling regularly throughout the rest of 2003 and 2004, Warlord wrestled at the first WrestleReunion on January 29, 2005, where he competed in a battle royal for the IWA Heavyweight Championship. However, he was eliminated by Greg "The Hammer" Valentine, who would go on to win the match and the title.

On April 29, 2006, he defeated Chaz to win the Maximum Xtreme Pro Wrestling Heavyweight Championship, his first singles title.

In August 2012, Chikara announced that the Warlord would be making his debut for the promotion in the following month's 2012 King of Trios tournament, where he will reunite with the Barbarian and Meng as the "Faces of Pain". On September 14, the team was eliminated from the tournament in the first round by Team ROH (Mike Bennett, Matt Jackson and Nick Jackson). Two days later, on the final day of the tournament, the Barbarian and the Warlord took part in a tag team gauntlet match, from which they eliminated their old WWF rivals, Demolition, before being eliminated themselves by the 1-2-3 Kid and Marty Jannetty.

As of 2026, Warlord still wrestles at 64 teaming with Barbarian.

== Personal life ==
In July 2016, Szopinski was named part of a class action lawsuit filed against WWE which alleged that wrestlers incurred traumatic brain injuries during their tenure and that the company concealed the risks of injury. The suit was litigated by attorney Konstantine Kyros, who has been involved in a number of other lawsuits against WWE. The lawsuit was dismissed by US District Judge Vanessa Lynne Bryant in September 2018.

== In other media ==
The Warlord is the second opponent in the 1991 computer game, WWF WrestleMania.

== Championships and accomplishments ==
- American Pro Wrestling Alliance
  - APWA Tag Team Championship (1 time) - with The Barbarian
- Central States Wrestling
  - NWA Central States Tag Team Championship (1 time) – with Karl Kovac
- Gatineau Pro Wrestling
  - GPW Tag Team Championship (1 time) - with The Barbarian
- Jim Crockett Promotions
  - NWA World Six-Man Tag Team Championship (1 time) – with Ivan Koloff and the Barbarian
- Maximum Xtreme Pro Wrestling
  - MXPW Heavyweight Championship (1 time)
- New England Pro Wrestling Hall of Fame
  - Class of 2013
- Pro Wrestling Illustrated
  - Ranked him No. 75 of the 500 best singles wrestlers in the PWI 500 in 1991
- Universal Superstars of America
  - USA Heavyweight Championship (1 time)
- Universal Championship Wrestling
  - UCW Universal Tag Team Championship (1 time, inaugural) - with The Barbarian
- World Wide Wrestling Alliance
  - WWWA Heavyweight Championship (1 time)
  - WWWA Tag Team Championship (1 time) – with the Barbarian
- Wrestle Association R
  - WAR World Six-Man Tag Team Championship (1 time) – with Bob Backlund and Scott Putski
- Wrestling Observer Newsletter
  - Worst Tag Team (1989) with the Barbarian
