= Strike Force (professional wrestling) =

Professional wrestling tag team

- Tito Santana (left), Rick Martel (right)

Tag team
- Members: Rick Martel; Tito Santana
- Name: Strike Force
- Billed heights: Rick Martel: 6 ft 0 in (1.83 m); Tito Santana: 6 ft 2 in (1.88 m)
- Combined billed weight: 460 lb (210 kg; 33 st)
- Debut: August 1987
- Disbanded: April 2, 1989
- Years active: 1987–1989

Strike Force was a professional wrestling tag team in the World Wrestling Federation (WWF) composed of Tito Santana and Rick Martel.

== History ==
=== American Wrestling Association ===
On August 29, 1982, Santana and Martel teamed up for the first time. They faced AWA Tag Team Champions The High Flyers, Greg Gagne and "Jumpin'" Jim Brunzell for the title. Martel and Santana came up short after Brunzell pinned Santana.

=== World Wrestling Federation ===
The team officially formed on a permanent basis after Martel defeated both members of The Islanders (Haku and Tama) in separate singles matches in July 1987 (after the departure of his then tag team partner Tom Zenk from the WWF, with Zenk's departure worked into the feud and used as fodder by the Islanders to taunt Martel). On the August 15, 1987 episode of WWF Superstars of Wrestling, the Islanders jumped Martel after his win over Barry Horowitz. Santana, who was doing commentary in the Spanish broadcast booth, ran to the ring to help Martel fight off the attackers. The team were played off as good looking pretty boys (a story-line that came directly from the team's predecessor The Can-Am Connection) even using the theme called "Girls In Cars", which was originally made for the Can-Am Connection. The name Strike Force came from Santana's promise that as a team they would, "be striking (the Islanders) with force." Martel immediately came up with the team's name based on this. They feuded with the Islanders until October, when they got a shot at The Hart Foundation for the Tag Team Championship. On October 27, 1987 they won the title when Jim Neidhart submitted to Martel's Boston crab. While feuding with the Harts, they resumed their feud with the Islanders, successfully defending the title against both teams at house shows across the country.

The team held onto the championship until WrestleMania IV, when they lost it to Demolition. Martel had Smash in the Boston Crab, until Ax hit him in the back of the head with Mr. Fuji's cane, while the ref was distracted by a fight between Santana and Fuji.

In July 1988, Martel (kayfabe) suffered an injury after taking Demolition's finisher on the floor, splitting up the team for several months. In reality, Martel took an extended leave of absence to help take care of his wife, who was severely ill.

Santana wrestled in singles matches again afterward for a while. Martel returned to the WWF in January 1989 at the Royal Rumble. Sometime later, Santana and Martel reunited, taking on The Brain Busters at WrestleMania V. After Santana accidentally knocked Martel out with a flying forearm, Martel left Santana alone in the ring to fend for himself, thus turning heel. Martel later stated that he felt Santana had been riding his coattails and was sick and tired of carrying him. The two feuded for the next year, as Martel transformed into "The Model" Rick Martel, an arrogant egomaniac. Both men scored wins over the other, including a win by Santana over Martel in the final of the 1989 King of the Ring tournament. Martel scored a win over Santana later in the year at the Survivor Series when he pinned his former partner as the first elimination of the opening match of the night. The feud between the two effectively died out after the Survivor Series, with the two sporadically facing each other in matches throughout 1990, with their last two televised meetings taking place around Thanksgiving, first being on the opposite sides of the Grand Finale match of the 1990 Survivor Series, where Santana's partners, Hulk Hogan and then-WWF Champion Ultimate Warrior were the sole survivors, giving Santana's team the victory, and a one on one match aired the next night on the November 23, 1990 (taped October 30) of The Main Event IV, where Martel won by submission.

Santana left the WWF in August 1993 and Martel in January 1995. Santana was inducted into the WWE Hall of Fame in 2005.

== Championships and accomplishments ==
- Pro Wrestling Illustrated

- PWI ranked them #70 of the 100 best Tag teams during the "PWI" years in 2003.

- World Wrestling Federation

- WWF World Tag Team Championship (1 time)
