= Rocky Hata =

Japanese professional wrestler (1948–1991)

Personal information
- Born: Mitsuo Hata; September 12, 1948 Akkeshi, Hokkaido, Japan
- Died: October 27, 1991 (aged 43)
- Cause of death: Complications from Diabetes

Professional wrestling career
- Ring name(s): Mitsu Hata; Mitsuo Hata; Rocky Hata
- Billed height: 1.92 m (6 ft 4 in)
- Billed weight: 108 kg (238 lb)
- Trained by: JWA Dojo
- Debut: August 3, 1972
- Retired: November 27, 1986

Mitsuo Hata (September 12, 1948 – October 27, 1991), better known by his ring name Rocky Hata, was a Japanese professional wrestler, best known for his appearances with All Japan Pro Wrestling during the 1970s and 1980s. He also competed in the United States in promotions such as NWA Tri-State, Championship Wrestling from Florida, Georgia Championship Wrestling, Central States Wrestling, and the St. Louis Wrestling Club.

== Professional wrestling career ==
=== Japan Wrestling Association (1972-1973) ===
Hata originally began in the Japanese Wrestling Association and trained at its dojo. He made his debut for the JWA on August 3, 1972, under his real name during their 1972 Summer Big Series I tour losing to Kazuo Sakurada. Hata spent his time in the JWA like a lot of rookies, working in the undercard and paying his dues while usually being on the losing end of matches. He won his first match on September 3 when he defeated Tsutomu Oshiro. By 1973, the JWA began to decline due to the firing of Antonio Inoki and the departure of Giant Baba and them forming their own promotions, New Japan Pro-Wrestling (Inoki) and All Japan Pro Wrestling (Baba). Hata's last match with JWA took place at the promotion's final show on April 20, 1973, during their Iron Claw Series defeating Kim Sung-ho by disqualification.

=== All Japan Pro Wrestling (1973-1975) ===
When the JWA closed, Hata jumped to All Japan Pro Wrestling debuting on June 30, 1973, during their 1973 Summer Action Series tour where he again lost to Kazuo Sakurada. Like with the JWA, Hata spent the next year and half working the undercard with his only notable highlight being winning an eight-man battle royal on July 14, 1974.

=== American excursion (1975-1977) ===
As is tradition in Japan, Hata was sent on a learning excursion to the United States in early 1975 to gain experience. After originally spending a brief period in NWA Tri-State, Hata then went to Championship Wrestling from Florida where he engaged in singles and tag matches with the likes of Dutch Mantell, Doug Somers, Eddie Graham, Jimmy Golden, Billy Robinson, Mike George, Mark Lewin, and Hiro Matsuda. In the mid-1976, Hata then briefly went to Georgia Championship Wrestling having matches with Jos Leduc and Ray Stevens.

By the fall, Hata went to Missouri with the St. Louis Wrestling Club and Central States Wrestling. On September 11, Hata got his first title shot when he challenged Bob Backlund for the NWA Missouri Heavyweight Championship but came up short. Hata then formed a successful tag team with Bob Brown with Hata winning his first title when he and Brown defeated Pat O'Connor and Harley Race for the Central States version of the NWA World Tag Team Championship on December 17. Hata and Brown would lose the titles back to O'Connor and Race sometime in January 1977 only to reclaim them for a second time on January 16. Hata and Brown held the belts for over a month before dropping them to Akio Sato and Ted Oates on February 25. Hata would then finish up back in CWF having matches with the likes of The Brisco Brothers, Mike Graham, Gino Hernandez, Hiro Matsuda, and Jos Leduc.

=== Return to All Japan Pro Wrestling (1977-1986) ===
Hata returned to All Japan on May 27 teaming with Jumbo Tsuruta to defeat Baron Von Raschke and Mario Milano. After a few matches back, Hata began using the name Rocky Hata and began receiving a small push teaming with Tsuruta and Baba while having matches with the likes of Kevin Sullivan, Don Muraco, Dick Murdoch, Bobo Brazil, Ken Patera, and Mil Mascaras. By the summer, Hata began teaming with the young up and coming Genichiro Tenryu and the two challenged Great Kojika and Motoshi Okuma for the All Asia Tag Team Championship in a two-out-of-three-falls match on September 7 but the match went to a sixty-minute time limit draw with both teams tied one fall. In the fall, Hata and Tenryu entered the first World's Strongest Tag Determination League tournament but placed in eighth with 1 point as they went to a 45-minute draw against Mighty Inoue and Akihisa Takachiho.

Hata then earned his biggest achievement in All Japan when he won the yearly New Year's Battle Royal on January 3, 1978. On February 5, Hata and Tenryu took on Kojika and Okuma in a two-out-of-three falls number one contenders match for the All Asia Tag Team Championship but it went to a draw. In the spring, Hata entered his first Champion Carnival but finished in 13th place with 4 points. Hata continued to get some big matches throughout 1978 wrestling Billy Robinson, Ric Flair, Pat O'Connor, & Terry Funk. In the fall, Hata entered the Japan League for the International Wrestling Enterprise finishing in 6th place of Block A with 11 points. In March 1979, Hata entered the Champion Carnival and fared better as he finished 11th place with 6 points. By 1980, Hata would settle into the midcard as he wouldn't challenge for titles or participate in the World's Strongest Tag League. He still did get some big matches taking on Robinson, Bruiser Brody, and Murdoch while scoring wins over Bill Irwin, Johnny Valiant, & Rick Martel. Hata entered the 1980 Champion Carnival and finished 10th place with 6 points. A year later, Hata entered the 1981 Champion Carnival tying 10th place with six points along with Prince Tonga and Great Kojika. In August, Hata teamed with Tenryu in the PWF Cup Tag Team Tournament but lost in the first round to Chavo Guerrero and Ricky Steamboat on August 21. Hata then participated in the 1982 Champion Carnival finishing in 11th place with 8 points. On March 30, 1983, Hata teamed with Takashi Ishikawa to challenge Ashura Hara and Mighty Inoue for the All Asia Tag Team Championship but lost. Hata would eventually finish his career in the undercard no longer challenging for championships or participating in tournaments. His last match would be on November 27, 1986, during the 1986 World's Strongest Tag Determination League tour teaming with Mighty Inoue in a losing effort against Animal Hamaguchi and Kuniaki Kobayashi. He retired afterwards.

== Death ==
Hata died on October 27, 1991, due to complications from diabetes. He was 43.

== Championships and Accomplishments ==
- All Japan Pro Wrestling
  - January 3 Korakuen Hall Heavyweight Battle Royal (1978)
- Central States Wrestling
  - NWA World Tag Team Championship (Central States version) (2 times) – with Bob Brown
- Tokyo Sports
  - Effort Award (1977)

== See also ==
- List of premature professional wrestling deaths
