= Fred Peloquin =

American professional wrestler

Personal information
- Born: Fred Peloquin; November 1, 1939 (age 86) St. Boniface, Winnipeg, Canada

Professional wrestling career
- Ring name(s): Fred Peloquin; French Mad Dog; Mad Dog Peloquin; Puppy Dog Peloquin
- Billed height: 5 ft 7 in (1.70 m)
- Billed weight: 215 lb (98 kg)
- Trained by: Tony Condello Stu Hart
- Debut: 1971
- Retired: 1993

Fred Peloquin (born November 1, 1939, in St. Boniface, Winnipeg, Canada), is a retired professional wrestler best known as for his work in the International Wrestling Alliance as Puppy Dog Peloquin.

== Professional wrestling career ==
=== Early career ===
Peloquin began his career in professional wrestling in 1971. He received training from Canadian wrestler/promoter Tony Condello.

From 1980 to 1981, Peloquin worked as an enhancement talent for the American Wrestling Association.

=== West Four Wrestling Alliance ===
Peloquin wrestled in Condello's promotion West Four Wrestling Alliance, which would later be known as the International Wrestling Alliance. While there, he managed to win the company's premier title, the WFWA Canadian Heavyweight Championship.

In 1986, International Wrestling Alliance promoted a crossover event with Stampede Wrestling, during which Peloquin (as Fred Peloquin) wrestled in a losing effort against Moe Malone.

== Personal life ==
Peloquin is the cousin of Canadian professional wrestler Chi Chi Cruz.

== Championships and accomplishments ==
- West Four Wrestling Alliance
  - WFWA Canadian Heavyweight Championship (3 time)
  - WFWA Canadian Tag Team Championship (2 time) - with Bobby Jones (2)
