= Jerry Oates =

American professional wrestler (1947–2026)

Personal information
- Born: Jerry Wayne Oates; September 5, 1947 Columbus, Georgia, U.S.
- Died: September 4, 2026 (aged 78) Columbus, Georgia, U.S.
- Spouse: Kathryn Newman (m. 1973; died 2019)

Professional wrestling career
- Ring names: Jerry Oates; Mr. USA
- Billed height: 6 ft 4 in (1.93 m)
- Billed weight: 253 lb (115 kg)
- Billed from: Columbus, Georgia, U.S.
- Trained by: Milo Steinborn; Dick Steinborn
- Debut: June 16, 1970
- Retired: July 22, 2006

Jerry Wayne Oates (September 5, 1947 – September 4, 2026) was an American professional wrestler and trainer.

== Career ==
=== 1970s ===
Trained by Milo Steinborn and his son Dick, Jerry Oates made his professional wrestling debut on June 16, 1970 for the National Wrestling Alliance's Tampa territory, Championship Wrestling from Florida, losing to Duke Keomuka. By November 1970, he would wrestle back and forth between Tampa and ABC Booking in Atlanta. In December 1971, Oates would start out for Gulf Coast Championship Wrestling in Dothan, Alabama, wrestling in a tri-state area. In January 1972, Oates wrestled his first Japanese tour for International Wrestling Enterprise. While staying active in Georgia and the Gulf Coast in 1972, he would also make stops for NWA Mid-America in Nashville, Tennessee and Tri-State Wrestling in Alabama. By August 1972, he began teaming up with his younger brother Ted. In November 1972, he briefly wrestled in Ann Gunkel's All-South Wrestling Alliance. In December 1973, he would wrestle a tour for Big Time Wrestling in Dallas, Texas. In June 1974, Oates won his very first championship, the NWA Columbus Heavyweight Championship, defeating Bob Sweetan. He would hold the title for nearly three months, before losing it to Harley Race. In September 1974, he started wrestling in Kansas City for Central States Wrestling. In January 1975, he won the Central States version of the NWA World Tag Team Championship with Mike George, defeating The Interns. A month later, he would become a double champion, winning the NWA Central States Heavyweight Championship from Terry Martin. A month later, he and George lost the World Tag Team titles to Oki Shikina and Yasu Fuji, but Jerry regained the titles two months later with his younger brother, Ted. Unfortunately, he would lose the Central States Heavyweight title ten days later to Ed Wiskoski. In August 1975, he would split his time between Kansas City for CSW and St. Louis for St. Louis Wrestling Club.

In February 1976, Oates returned to GCW. A month later, he and his brother Ted won the NWA Georgia Tag Team Championship, defeating Les Thornton and Tony Charles. The brothers would hold the titles for nearly three months, before losing them to the Red Devils. In September 1976, Oates would return to Japan, this time for All Japan Pro Wrestling, alongside his brother. A month later, the brothers defeated Motoshi Okuma and Great Kojika to win the All Asia Tag Team Championship. They would hold the titles for nearly three weeks, before losing them to Samson Kutsuwada and Akihisa Takachiho. In November 1976, Oates would go to the Tri-State territory in Tulsa, Oklahoma. In August 1977, he won the Tri-State version of the NWA North American Heavyweight Championship, defeating Dick Murdoch. He would hold the title for nearly three months, before losing the title back to Murdoch. In January 1978, Oates went over to Portland to wrestle in Pacific Northwest Wrestling. In March 1978, he won the NWA Pacific Northwest Tag Team Championship with Jesse Ventura, defeating Buddy Rose and Ed Wiskoski. They would hold onto the titles for nearly a month, before losing them to Bull Ramos and The Iron Sheik. In May 1978, he defeated Ed Wiskoski to win the NWA Pacific Northwest Heavyweight Championship and held it for over a month before losing it back to Wiskoski. At the end of June 1978, he wrestled a show in Los Angeles for NWA Hollywood Wrestling, before a brief return to the Tri-State territory, before debuting in the Mid-Atlantic area in July 1978. He briefly returned to GCW in December 1978, going back and forth between Georgia and the Carolinas. In May 1979, he returned to the Tri-State territory, which had changed to Mid-South Wrestling after Bill Watts bought the territory from Leroy McGuirk.

=== 1980s ===
In January 1980, Oates went up north to Detroit to wrestle for Big Time Wrestling. A month later, he and his brother Ted returned to Kansas City to take part in a tournament for the vacant NWA Central States Tag Team Championship. They defeated Bob Sweetan and Takachiho in the quarterfinals and The Assassin and Rock Hunter in the semifinals, before losing to Ernie Ladd and Bruiser Brody in the finals. He would remain active in the Mid-South, Southeast and the Midwest throughout the year. In July 1981, he would take part in the final tour of the IWE in Japan, before the promotion closed down. Oates would split his time between Georgia and Alabama throughout 1982, except in July, where he went on tour for AJPW in Japan. In 1983, he would split his time between Georgia, St. Louis and Mid-South, as well as a tour of Japan for AJPW that July. In 1984, Oates would split his time between Georgia and Missouri. In April 1984, he and his brother Ted won the NWA Central States Tag Team titles, defeating the Grapplers. A week later, they would lose the titles to the Grapplers in a rematch. In July 1984, he would team with Ron Garvin to win the NWA National Tag Team Championship, defeating The Road Warriors. During the title reign, Georgia Championship Wrestling would be sold to Vince McMahon. Ole Anderson would start up Championship Wrestling from Georgia, where Oates and Garvin remained champions for nearly four months before losing them to The Hollywood Blonds (Rip Rogers and Jerry's brother Ted Oates). In 1985, he split his time between Georgia, Alabama and Tennessee.

In 1986, Oates and his brother Ted wrestled sporadically. In September 1986, the brothers went to Dallas to take part in a tournament for the WCWA World Tag Team Championship; they would lose to The Youngblood Brothers in the quarterfinals. Two months later, they would wrestle in Deep South Wrestling, where they won the DSW Tag Team Championship from the Nightmares (Ted Allen and Billy Star). The brothers would hold the titles for two months, before losing the titles back to the Nightmares. In March 1987, Oates would return to AJPW for a single tour. In August 1987, he would wrestle for AWA Georgia, where he would also wrestle under the masked persona, Mr. USA. In 1988, Oates would wrestle two tours for AJPW: one in February and one in August. In February 1989, he would wrestle his final single tour for AJPW.

=== 1990s ===
In January 1991, Oates wrestled at a WWF Superstars of Wrestling TV taping in Macon, Georgia, teaming with The Brooklyn Brawler in a loss to The Rockers; the match aired on March 2. By 1993, he wrestled regularly for Peach State Wrestling. In August 1993, he and his brother Ted took part in PSW's United States Tag Team Championship tournament. They defeated The Nightmare and Steve Lawler in the quarterfinals, but the semi-finals against Mike Golden and The Masked Superstar ended in a no-contest, eliminating both teams. By the late 1990s, Oates wrestled semi-regularly.

=== 2000s ===
In 2004, Oates began promoting his version of Georgia Championship Wrestling. A year later, the promotion's name was changed to Great Championship Wrestling. On July 22, 2006, Oates wrestled his last match to date, teaming with Scott Fantastic, defeating Harley Wood and Death Row. After retiring, he sold GCW to Bill and Diane Hewes, who ran the promotion until 2010.

== Personal life and death ==
Jerry Wayne Oates was born in Columbus, Georgia, on September 5, 1947.

Oates, alongside his brother Ted, was responsible in training Marty Jannetty, Bambi, Randy Hogan, J-Rod, AJ Steele, Tom Ivy and Craig Brown.

Outside of professional wrestling, Oates ran Oates Gym in Columbus, Georgia. He would promote the Southeastern Bodybuilding Championships from the 1980s to the 1990s. He also served as a deputy for the Tybee Island Police Department and as a bailiff for the Muscogee County Sheriff's Office.

Married in 1973, his wife Kathryn (née, Newman; born January 14, 1940) died on June 22, 2019, at the age of 79.

In April 2020, Oates re-opened Oates Gym in Columbus, Georgia at a new location, just down the street from the original location that was located from its inception in 1979 to its closure in 2002.

Jerry Oates died in hospice care in Columbus on September 4, 2026, one day shy of his 79th birthday.

== Championships and accomplishments ==
- All Japan Pro Wrestling
  - All Asia Tag Team Championship (1 time) – with Ted Oates
- Deep South Wrestling
  - DSW Tag Team Championship (1 time) – with Ted Oates
- Georgia Championship Wrestling
  - NWA Columbus Heavyweight Championship (1 time)
  - NWA Georgia Tag Team Championship (1 time) – with Ted Oates
  - NWA National Tag Team Championship (1 time) – with Ron Garvin
- Central States Wrestling
  - NWA Central States Heavyweight Championship (1 time)
  - NWA Central States Tag Team Championship (1 times) – with Ted Oates
  - NWA World Tag Team Championship (Central States version) (4 times) – with Mike George (1) and Ted Oates (3)
- NWA Tri-State
  - NWA North American Heavyweight Championship (Tri-State version) (1 time)
- Pacific Northwest Wrestling
  - NWA Pacific Northwest Heavyweight Championship (1 time)
  - NWA Pacific Northwest Tag Team Championship (1 time) – with Jesse Ventura
