= Canadian Death Tour =

Professional wrestling tour

The Canadian Death Tour or Northern Hell Tour, and sometimes just known as the "Death Tour", is a professional wrestling tour of the northern territories of Canada promoted by Tony Condello annually for over 30 years during the winters. The tour takes wrestlers from all over North America and drives them around the Inuit communities which are rarely exposed to wrestling. The tour derives its name from the fact that many wrestlers who participate in it found it to be a near-death experience due to how harsh and difficult it was to complete. To complete a death tour is considered a badge of honour and evidence of a wrestlers toughness, similar to having been trained in "the Dungeon".

== History ==
Each tour is three weeks long and is held from January to February. As there are no hotels in the areas which the tour appears in wrestlers are required to bring their own sleeping bags with them on this trips and sleep on gym mats in the school gymnasiums where they had performed hours earlier or find a place to room in on their own. Wrestlers are also required to buy their own food. Many of the younger people who have participated in the tours have elected to change profession after returning home. It is widely regarded as an honor to be offered a spot on the tour, and completing it grants the wrestler a high status for their tenacity. Condello himself has expressed that "this tour is not just a tour; it is an exercise in mind and body". Wrestler and historian Vance Nevada has stated that he had always wanted to do the tour because it was such an important piece of Canadian wrestling lore; with its alumni reading like a "who's who" of the business greats.

Wrestler Tony Kozina has expressed that touring in Canada in general is painful and that the experience of it does not have to come from a Death Tour for you to be tough.

The tours are the main subject of the documentary films The Promoter (2014) and The Death Tour (2024).

== Wrestlers to complete a death tour ==
=== Canadians ===
| Name | Number of tours | Birth year | Year(s) participated | Notes | Refs |
|---|---|---|---|---|---|
| Adam Copeland | 1 | 1973 | | Copeland almost drove a crew van into a football-field sized hole in the ice of a lake. | |
| Christian Cage | 1 | 1973 | | Was one of the seven wrestlers with Copeland in the van. | |
| Matt Hart | 1 | 1993 | 2016 | Hart turned 23 during the tour, it was otherwise relatively uneventful and he suffered no other steps closer to death. | |
| Tony Condello | 30 | 1942 | 1988–2018 | Condello has been on every single tour. | |
| Vance Nevada | 4 | 1975 | | | |
| Eddie Watts | 2 | 1968 | | | |
| Don Callis | 3 | 1963 | | Got booked to wrestle a murderer. | |
| Sarah Stock | 1 | 1979 | | | |
| Rick Patterson | 1 | 1964 | | | |
| Joe Legend | 1 | 1969 | | | |
| Lance Storm | 5 | 1969 | | | |
| Kenny Omega | 1 | 1983 | | | |
| Gurvinder Sihra | 2 | 1984 | 2006–2007 | | |
| Harvinder Sihra | 2 | 1987 | 2006–2007 | | |
| Jak Lydon | 1 | | | | |
| Kaitlin Diemond | 1 | | | | |
| Bob Wayne | 1 | | | | |
| Aurora | 1 | | 2007 | | |
| Bambi Hall | 1 | 1992 | 2013 | | |
| Bobby Sharp | | 1988 | 2018 | | |
| Chris Jericho | 2 | 1970 | | | |

=== Foreigners ===
| Name | Number of tours | Birth year | Year(s) participated | Notes | Refs |
|---|---|---|---|---|---|
| Scott Norton | 1 | 1961 | 1989 | Went into shock when the bus he and the other wrestlers were traveling got stuck in snow. | |
| Rhyno | 1 | 1975 | | Was in a van which almost fell through the ice. | |
| Johnny Swinger | 1 | 1975 | | | |
| Baron von Raschke | 3 | 1940 | | | |

== See also ==
- Professional wrestling in Canada
