= WFWA Canadian Heavyweight Championship =

The WFWA Canadian Heavyweight Championship was the title contested for in the Manitoba-based professional wrestling promotion West Four Wrestling Alliance.

== Title history ==
Wrestler:	Times:	Date:	Location:	Notes:
Tony Condello	1	1974		
Mad Dog Peloquin	1	1974		
Tony Condello	2	1974		
Mad Dog Peloquin	2	January 1978		
Tony Condello	3	1978		
The Mauler (Vince DeLuca)	1	1978	Neepawa, Manitoba	
Tony Condello	4	1982		
Mad Dog Peloquin	3	1986		
Title vacated in May 1986.
Akim Singh	1	July 31, 1989		Defeated Chi Chi Cruz for the vacant title.
Title vacated in 1990 when Singh leaves the promotion.
The Natural	1	November 1990	Windsor, Ontario	
E.Z. Ryder	1	January 14, 1991	Winnipeg, Manitoba	
Pampero El Felipo	1	March 2, 1991	Winnipeg, Manitoba	
E.Z. Ryder	2	March 4, 1991	Winnipeg, Manitoba	
Title vacated in May 1991.
The Natural	2	May 21, 1991	Winnipeg, Manitoba	Defeated Mike Lozanski for the vacant title.
Title vacated in February 1992.
Gerry Morrow	1	February 25, 1992	Winnipeg, Manitoba	Won a battle royal for the vacant title, last eliminating Gene Kiniski.
Chi Chi Cruz	1	May 31, 1992	Winnipeg, Manitoba	
Bob Brown	1	January 1993	Winnipeg, Manitoba	Wins by forfeit when Cruz is injured.
Gene Swan	1	February 1993	Winnipeg, Manitoba	
Chi Chi Cruz	2	March 6, 1993	Winnipeg, Manitoba	
The Natural	3	August 10, 1993	Niverville, Manitoba	
Jim Brunzell	1	August 22, 1993	Winnipeg, Manitoba	
The Natural	4	August 22, 1993	Winnipeg, Manitoba	
Steve Rivers	1	February 17, 1994	Little Ground Rapids, Manitoba	
The Natural	5	February 18, 1994	Wasagemak, Manitoba	
Title vacated in April 1994.
Chi Chi Cruz	3	May 15, 1994	Winnipeg, Manitoba	Defeats Stan Saxton for the vacant title.
Title vacated in July 1994 when Cruz retires due to injury in a boating accident.
Stan Saxton	1	July 24, 1994	Winnipeg, Manitoba	Defeats Bruiser Bastien for the vacant title.

== See also ==
- Professional wrestling in Canada
