= NWA World Tag Team Championship (Central States version) =

Professional wrestling tag team championship

- The Central States championship belt

Details
- Promotion: Heart of America Sports Attractions; Central States Wrestling
- Date established: No later than May 26, 1950
- Date retired: 1979
Statistics
- First champions: The Battling Duseks (Ernie Dusek and Joe Dusek)
- Most reigns: Team: The Battling Duseks (Ernie Dusek and Joe Dusek; 5 reigns); Individual: Ernie Dusek, Joe Dusek (7 reigns)
- Longest reign: Ernie and Joe Dusek (at least 545 days)

The Central States version of the NWA World Tag Team Championship was the main professional wrestling championship for tag teams in Heart of America Sports Attractions, later known as Central States Wrestling (CSW) from 1951 to 1959, then again from 1962 to 1963 and then finally from 1973 to 1979. CSW was a member of the National Wrestling Alliance (NWA), whose bylaws allowed any of their members, referred to as NWA territories, to create their own version of the NWA World Tag Team Championship that would be promoted within their territory. The Central States version was primarily defended in CSW's home town of Kansas City and during their shows across Missouri, Kansas and Iowa. As it was a professional wrestling championship, it was not won or lost competitively but instead by the decision of the bookers. The title was awarded after the chosen team "wins" a match to maintain the illusion that professional wrestling is a competitive sport. In 1957 there were at least 13 different versions of the NWA World Tag Team Championship being promoted in various NWA territories across the United States.^{[Championships]}

The Battling Duseks (Emil Dusek and Joe Dusek) were the first NWA World Tag Team Champions in the Hearts of America promotion. Records do not indicate if the Duseks won a tournament or were simply awarded the championship by the promoters prior to being presented as champions on May 26, 1950. Joe and Ernie Dusek would later hold the championship as well as the combination of Emil and Ernie holding the championship twice before the championship was abandoned in 1960. From 1960 to 1962 the championship was inactive and instead the NWA Central States Tag Team Championship was recognized as the main tag team championship in the territory. On October 10, 1962 Pat O'Connor and Sonny Myers defeated Bob Geigel and Lee Hennig to win the NWA World Tag Team Champions as the promoters brought the championship back. The second era of the championship lasted for around two years until it was abandoned in lieu of the newly created NWA North American Tag Team Championship around 1963. In 1973 CSW abandoned the North American championship and brought the NWA World Tag Team Championship back. Great Togo and Tokyo Joe defeated Bob Geigel and Rufus R. Jones to win the vacant championship. In 1979 Central States Wrestling once again abandoned the championship to permanently adopt the NWA Central States Tag Team Championship as their top tag team championship. Bob Brown and Bob Sweetan were the last holders of the NWA World Tag Team Championship.

Ernie and Joe Dusek teamed up to win a total of five tag team championships, the most of any team, followed by Emil and Ernie teaming up for a total of three championships as a unit. Ernie and Joe Dusek both held the championship a total of seven times, the most individual reigns. The longest reign of any of the three championships eras belongs to Ernie and Joe Dusek, who held the championship for at least 545 days from late 1956 to June 27, 1958. Due to lack of specific dates for many of the early championship changes it is impossible to clearly determine who had the shortest reign of any champion. The shortest confirmed reign was an eight-day reign for the team of Larry Hamilton and Sonny Myers from October 25 to November 2, 1956.

== Title history ==
Key
| No. | Overall reign number |
| Reign | Reign number for the specific team—reign numbers for the individuals are in parentheses, if different |
| Days | Number of days held |

| No. | Champion | Championship change | | | Reign statistics | | Notes | Ref. |
| No. | Champion | Date | Event | Location | Reign | Days | Notes | Ref. |
|---|---|---|---|---|---|---|---|---|
| 1 | The Battling Duseks (Emil Dusek and Joe Dusek) | May 26, 1950 (NLT) | CSW show | (Note: The location of the match was not captured as part of the championship documentation.) | 1 | (Note: The length of this reign is too uncertain to calculate.) | Records are unclear on how the Duseks became the first champions | |
| — | | N/A | — | — | | | | |
| 2 | Dennis Clary and Ron Etchison | April 10, 1951 (NLT) | CSW show | | 1 | (Note: The date the championship was won and lost has not been documented which means the championship reign lasted between 1 day and 262 days) | | |
| — | | N/A | — | — | | | | |
| 3 | The Battling Duseks (Emil Dusek and Joe Dusek) | December 28, 1951 (NLT) | CSW show | | 2 | (Note: The date the championship was lost has not been documented which means the championship reign lasted at least 35 days) | | |
| 4 | Babe and Chris Zaharias | February 1, 1952 | N/A | N/A | 1 | | | |
| 5 | Bobby and George Becker | November 1952 (NLT) | CSW show | | 1 | (Note: The date the championship was won has not been documented which means the championship reign lasted anywhere between 1 day and 27 days) | | |
| 6 | The Battling Duseks (Ernie Dusek and Joe Dusek (3)) | November 27, 1952 | CSW show | Kansas City, Kansas | 1 | (Note: The date the championship was lost has not been documented which means the championship reign lasted anywhere between 1 day and 8 days) | | |
| 7 | Bobby and George Becker | December 5, 1952 (NLT) | N/A | N/A | 2 | (Note: The date the championship was lost has not been documented which means the championship reign lasted anywhere between 1 day and 8 days) | | |
| 8 | The Battling Duseks (Ernie Dusek and Joe Dusek (4)) | December 6, 1952 | CSW show | Kansas City, Kansas | 2 | | Still billed as champions on December 7, 1953 | |
| — | | N/A | — | — | | | | |
| 9 | Reggie Lisowski and Art Neilson | March 23, 1954 (NLT) | CSW show | | 1 | | | |
| — | | N/A | — | — | | | | |
| 10 | Lou Newman and Hans Schnabel | April 10, 1955 (NLT) | CSW show | | 1 | | In St Joseph, Missouri the team was reported as having defeated Lisowksi and Neilson for the "United States" Tag Team Championship | |
| — | | N/A | — | — | | | | |
| 11 | Reggie Lisowski and Art Neilson | October 1955 (NLT) | CSW show | | 2 | (Note: The date the championship was won and lost has not been documented which means the championship reign lasted anywhere between 1 day and 30 days) | | |
| 12 | Guy Brunetti and Joe Tangaro | October 1955 | CSW show | | 1 | | Still billed as champions on January 27, 1956 | |
| — | | N/A | — | — | | | | |
| 13 | The Kalmikoffs (Ivan and Karol Kalmikoff) | August 5, 1956 (NLT) | CSW show | | 1 | | | |
| — | | N/A | — | — | | | | |
| 14 | The Battling Duseks (Ernie Dusek and Joe Dusek (5)) | October 18, 1956 (NLT) | CSW show | | 3 | (Note: The date the championship was won has not been documented which means the championship reign lasted at least 7 days) | | |
| 15 | Larry Hamilton and Sonny Myers | October 25, 1956 | CSW show | Kansas City, Kansas | 1 | 8 | | |
| 16 | The Battling Duseks (Ernie Dusek and Joe Dusek (6)) | November 2, 1956 | CSW show | St. Joseph, Missouri | 4 | 14 | | |
| 17 | Larry Hamilton and Sonny Myers | November 16, 1956 | CSW show | St. Joseph, Missouri | 2 | (Note: The date the championship was lost has not been documented which means the championship reign lasted anywhere between 1 day and 43 days) | | |
| 18 | The Battling Duseks (Ernie Dusek and Joe Dusek (7)) | December 29, 1956 (NLT) | CSW show | | 5 | (Note: The date the championship was won has not been documented which means the championship reign lasted at least 545 days) | | |
| 19 | Sonny Myers and Thor Hagen | June 27, 1958 | CSW show | St. Joseph, Missouri | 1 | (Note: The date the championship was lost has not been documented which means the championship reign lasted anywhere between 188 days and 218 days) | | |
| 20 | The Battling Duseks (Emil Dusek (3) and Ernie Dusek (6)) | January 1959 | CSW show | | 1 | (Note: The date the championship was won has not been documented which means the championship reign lasted anywhere between 102 days and 132 days) | | |
| 21 | The Flying Scotts (George and Sandy Scott) | May 13, 1960 | CSW show | St. Joseph, Missouri | 1 | 28 | | |
| 22 | The Battling Duseks (Emil Dusek (4) and Ernie Dusek (7)) | June 10, 1960 | CSW show | St. Joseph, Missouri | 2 | (Note: The date the championship was lost has not been documented which means the championship reign lasted anywhere between 1 day and 204 days) | | |
| — | Deactivated | 1960 | — | — | — | — | Championship inactive | |
Replaced by the NWA Central States Tag Team Championship
| 23 | Pat O'Connor and Sonny Myers | October 18, 1962 | CSW show | Kansas City, Kansas | 1 | (Note: The date the championship was lost has not been documented which means the championship reign lasted anywhere between 165 days and 173 days) | Defeated Bob Geigel and Lee Henning. | |
| 24 | Al and Tiny Mills | April 1963 | CSW show | | 1 | (Note: The date the championship was lost has not been documented which means the championship reign lasted anywhere between 1 day and 9 days) | Records unclear if they defeated O'Connor and Myers or a different team to win the championship | |
| 25 | Steve Bolus and Steve Kovacs | April 10, 1963 | CSW show | Kansas City, Kansas | 1 | (Note: The date the championship was lost has not been documented which means the championship reign lasted anywhere between 52 days and 81 days) | | |
| 26 | The Medics (Nelson Royal and Pedro Gordy) | June 1963 | CSW show | | 1 | (Note: The date the championship was won has not been documented which means the championship reign lasted anywhere between 4 days and 33 days) | | |
| 27 | Pat O'Connor (2) and Tiny Mills (2) | July 4, 1963 | CSW show | Kansas City, Kansas | 1 | (Note: The records of the championship history past this point have not been found documented. The championship reign lasted anywhere between 1 day and 180 days) | | |
| — | Deactivated | 1963 | — | — | — | — | Championship inactive | |
Replaced by the NWA North American Tag Team Championship
| 28 | Great Togo and Tokyo Joe | March 8, 1973 | CSW show | | 1 | (Note: The date the championship was lost has not been documented which means the championship reign lasted anywhere between 1 day and 229 days) | Defeated Bob Geigel and Rufus R. Jones to win the championship | |
| 39 | Bob Geigel and Rufus R. Jones | 1973 | CSW show | | 1 | (Note: The date the championship was lost has not been documented which means the championship reign lasted anywhere between 1 day and 229 days) | | |
| 30 | Great Togo and Tokyo Joe | 1973 | CSW show | | 2 | (Note: The date the championship was lost has not been documented which means the championship reign lasted anywhere between 1 day and 227 days) | | |
| 31 | Mike George and Jim Brunzell | October 25, 1973 | CSW show | | 1 | 84 | | |
| 32 | Roger Kirby and Lord Alfred Hayes | January 17, 1974 | CSW show | Kansas City, Kansas | 1 | (Note: The date the championship was lost has not been documented which means the championship reign lasted anywhere between 1 day and 40 days) | | |
| 33 | Mike George and Jim Brunzell | 1974 | CSW show | | 2 | (Note: The date the championship was won has not been documented which means the championship reign lasted anywhere between 1 day and 41 days) | | |
| 34 | Bob Brown and Lord Alfred Hayes (2) | February 28, 1974 | CSW show | Kansas City, Kansas | 1 | (Note: The date the championship was lost has not been documented which means the championship reign lasted anywhere between 93 days and 104 days) | | |
| 35 | Bob Geigel and Rufus R. Jones | June 1974 | CSW show | | 2 | (Note: The date the championship was won has not been documented which means the championship reign lasted anywhere between 1 day and 12 days) | | |
| 36 | The Interns (Intern #1 and Intern #2) | June 13, 1974 | CSW show | Kansas City, Kansas | 1 | 21 | | |
| 37 | Bob Geigel (3) and Pat O'Connor (3) | July 4, 1974 | CSW show | Kansas City, Kansas | 1 | 14 | | |
| 38 | The Interns (Intern #1 and Intern #2) | July 18, 1974 | CSW show | Kansas City, Kansas | 2 | 42 | | |
| 39 | Pat O'Connor (4) and Omar Atlas | August 29, 1974 | CSW show | Kansas City, Kansas | 1 | 53 | | |
| 40 | The Interns (Intern #1 and Intern #2) | October 21, 1974 | CSW show | | 3 | 81 | | |
| 41 | Mike George (3) and Jerry Oates | January 10, 1975 | CSW show | | 1 | 73 | | |
| 42 | Yasu Fuji and Oki Shikina | March 24, 1975 | CSW show | Topeka, Kansas | 1 | 63 | | |
| 43 | Jerry and Ted Oates | May 26, 1975 | CSW show | Wichita, Kansas | 1 | (Note: The date the championship was lost has not been documented which means the championship reign lasted anywhere between 1 day and 219 days) | | |
| 44 | Jerry Oates (2) and Danny Little Bear | 1975 | N/A | | 1 | (Note: The date the championship was lost has not been documented which means the championship reign lasted anywhere between 1 day and 218 days) | Ted gave his half to Danny. | |
| — | Vacated | 1975 | — | — | — | — | Championship vacated, for undocumented reasons | |
| 45 | Dutch Mantel and Ron Bass | November 1975 | CSW show | | 1 | (Note: The date the championship was won has not been documented which means the championship reign lasted anywhere between 80 days and 109 days) | Records unclear as to whom they defeated. | |
| 46 | Bob Geigel (4) and Akio Sato | February 18, 1976 | CSW show | St. Joseph, Missouri | 1 | (Note: The date the championship was vacated has not been documented which means the championship reign lasted anywhere between 1 day and 852 days) | | |
| — | Vacated | 1976 | — | — | — | — | Championship vacated, for undocumented reasons | |
| 47 | Tank Patton and Super Intern (4) (Note: Previously worked as Intern #2) | June 19, 1976 | CSW show | St. Joseph, Missouri | 1 | (Note: The date the championship was lost has not been documented which means the championship reign lasted anywhere between 1 day and 37 days) | Defeated Akio Sato and Pat O'Connor. | |
| — | Vacated | 1976 | — | — | — | — | Championship vacated, for undocumented reason. | |
| 48 | Black Gordman and Great Goliath | July 29, 1976 | CSW show | Kansas City, Kansas | 1 | 63 | Defeated Pat O'Connor and Super Intern in tournament final. | |
| 49 | Maurice Vachon and Baron von Raschke | September 30, 1976 | CSW show | Kansas City, Kansas | 1 | 21 | | |
| 50 | Mike George (4) and Super Intern (5) | October 21, 1976 | CSW show | Kansas City, Kansas | 1 | (Note: The date the championship was lost has not been documented which means the championship reign lasted anywhere between 72 days and 405 days) | | |
| 51 | Pat O'Connor (5) and Harley Race | December 16, 1976 (NLT) | CSW show | | 1 | (Note: The date the championship was lost has not been documented which means the championship reign lasted anywhere between 1 days and 55 days) | | |
| 52 | Bob Brown (2) and Mitsuo Hata | December 17, 1976 | CSW show | | 1 | (Note: The date the championship was lost has not been documented which means the championship reign lasted anywhere between 15 days and 28 days) | | |
| 53 | Pat O'Connor (6) and Harley Race | January 1977 | CSW show | | 2 | (Note: The date the championship was lost has not been documented which means the championship reign lasted anywhere between 1 days and 15 days) | | |
| 54 | Bob Brown (3) and Mitsuo Hata | January 16, 1977 | CSW show | Cedar Rapids, Iowa | 2 | 40 | | |
| 55 | Ted Oates (4) and Akio Sato (2) | February 25, 1977 | CSW show | St. Joseph, Missouri | 1 | (Note: The date the championship was lost has not been documented which means the championship reign lasted anywhere between 1 days and 70 days) | | |
| 56 | Bobby Jaggers and Randy Tyler | May 6, 1977 (NLT) | CSW show | St. Joseph, Missouri | 1 | (Note: The date the championship was lost has not been documented which means the championship reign lasted anywhere between 1 days and 168 days) | | |
| 57 | Jerry Blackwell and Buck Robley | October 21, 1977 (NLT) | CSW show | | 1 | (Note: The date the championship was lost has not been documented which means the championship reign lasted anywhere between 1 day and 208 days) | Records are unclear as to whom they defeated to win the championship | |
| 58 | Mike George (5) and Scott Casey | December 1, 1977 | CSW show | Kansas City, Kansas | 1 | 126 | | |
| 59 | Bob Brown (4) and Alexis Smirnoff | April 6, 1978 | CSW show | Kansas City, Kansas | 1 | 18 | | |
| 60 | Kevin Sullivan and Ken Lucas | April 24, 1978 | CSW show | Kansas City, Kansas | 1 | (Note: The date the championship was lost has not been documented which means the championship reign lasted anywhere between 1 day and 93 days) | | |
| 61 | Blue Yankee and Buck Robley | 1978 | CSW show | | 1 | (Note: The date the championship was lost has not been documented which means the championship reign lasted anywhere between 1 day and 93 days) | | |
| 62 | Ron Starr and Tom Andrews | July 27, 1978 | CSW show | Kansas City, Kansas | 1 | 49 | | |
| 63 | Jesse Ventura and Tank Patton (2) | September 14, 1978 | CSW show | Kansas City, Kansas | 1 | 30 | | |
| 64 | Bob Brown (5) and Bob Sweetan | October 14, 1978 | CSW show | Des Moines, Iowa | 1 | (Note: The date the championship abandoned has not been documented which means the championship reign lasted anywhere between 79 days and 443 days) | | |
| — | Deactivated | 1979 | — | — | — | — | Permanently replaced by the NWA Central States Tag Team Championship | |

== Team reigns by combined length ==
Key

| Symbol | Meaning |
|---|---|
| ¤ | The exact length of at least one title reign is uncertain, so the shortest possible length is used. |

| Rank | Team | No. of reigns | Combined days |
|---|---|---|---|
| 1 | The Battling Duseks (Ernie Dusek and Joe Dusek) | 5 | 567¤ |
| 2 | Sonny Myers and Thor Hagen | 1 | 188¤ |
| 3 | Roger Kirby and Lord Alfred Hayes | 1 | 165¤ |
| 4 | The Interns (Intern #1 and Intern #2) | 1 | 144 |
| 5 | Mike George and Scott Casey | 1 | 126 |
| 6 | The Battling Duseks (Emil Dusek and Ernie Dusek) | 3 | 103¤ |
| 7 | Bob Brown and Lord Alfred Hayes | 1 | 93¤ |
| 8 | Mike George and Jim Brunzell | 2 | 85¤ |
| 9 | Dutch Mantell and Ron Bass | 2 | 80¤ |
| 10 | Bob Brown and Bob Sweetan | 1 | 79¤ |
| 11 | Mike George and Jerry Oates | 1 | 73 |
| 12 | Mike George and Super Intern | 1 | 72 |
| 13 | Yasu Fuji and Oki Shikina | 1 | 63 |
| 13 | Black Gordman and Great Goliath | 1 | 63 |
| 15 | Pat O'Connor and Omar Atlas | 1 | 53 |
| 15 | Pat O'Connor and Sonny Myers | 1 | 53¤ |
| 17 | Steve Bolus and Steve Kovacs | 1 | 52¤ |
| 18 | Ron Starr and Tom Andrews | 1 | 49 |
| 19 | Jesse Ventura and Tank Patton | 1 | 30 |
| 20 | George and Sandy Scott | 1 | 28 |
| 21 | Maurice Vachon and Baron Von Raschke | 1 | 21 |
| 22 | Bob Brown and Alexis Smirnoff | 1 | 18 |
| 23 | Bob Geigel and Pat O'Connor | 1 | 14 |
| 24 | The Medics (Nelson Royal and Pedro Gordy) | 1 | 3¤ |
| 25 | Bob Geigel and Rufus R. Jones | 2 | 2¤ |
| 25 | Great Togo and Tokyo Joe | 2 | 2¤ |
| 25 | Bobby and George Becker | 2 | 2¤ |
| 28 | Al and Tiny Mills | 1 | 1¤ |
| 28 | Jerry and Ted Oates | 1 | 1¤ |
| 28 | Jerry Oates and Danny Little Bear | 1 | 1¤ |
| 28 | Bob Geigel and Akio Sato | 1 | 1¤ |
| 28 | Jerry Blackwell and Buck Robley | 1 | 1¤ |
| 28 | Kevin Sullivan and Ken Lucas | 1 | 1¤ |
| 28 | Pat O'Connor and Tiny Mills | 1 | 1¤ |
| 28 | Blue Yankee and Buck Robley | 1 | 1¤ |
| 28 | Tank Patton and Super Intern | 1 | 1¤ |
| 28 | Reggie Lisowski and Art Neilson | 2 | 1¤ |
| 28 | Dennis Clary and Ron Etchison | 1 | 1¤ |
| 39 | The Battling Duseks (Emil Dusek and Joe Dusek) | 2 | ¤ |
| 39 | Babe and Chris Zaharias | 1 | ¤ |
| 39 | Lou Newman and Hans Schnabel | 1 | ¤ |
| 39 | Guy Brunetti and Joe Tangaro | 1 | ¤ |
| 39 | The Kalmikoffs (Ivan and Karol Kalmikoff) | 1 | ¤ |

== Individual reigns by combined length ==
Key

| Symbol | Meaning |
|---|---|
| ¤ | The exact length of at least one title reign is uncertain, so the shortest possible length is used. |

| Rank | Wrestler | No. of reigns | Combined days |
|---|---|---|---|
| 1 | Ernie Dusek | 7 | 670¤ |
| 2 | Joe Dusek | 7 | 567¤ |
| 3 | Mike George | 3 | 271 |
| 4 | Lord Alfred Hayes | 2 | 258¤ |
| 5 | Sonny Myers | 2 | 241¤ |
| 6 | Intern #2 / Super Intern | 6 | 217¤ |
| 7 | Bob Brown | 3 | 190¤ |
| 8 | Thor Hagen | 1 | 188¤ |
| 9 | Roger Kirby | 1 | 165¤ |
| 10 | Intern#2 | 1 | 144 |
| 11 | Scott Casey | 1 | 126 |
| 12 | Pat O'Connor | 3 | 120¤ |
| 13 | Emil Dusek | 3 | 104¤ |
| 14 | Mike George and Jim Brunzell | 2 | 85¤ |
| 14 | Jim Brunzell | 2 | 85¤ |
| 16 | Dutch Mantell | 2 | 80¤ |
| 16 | Ron Bass | 2 | 80¤ |
| 18 | Bob Sweetan | 1 | 79¤ |
| 19 | Jerry Oates | 3 | 75¤ |
| 20 | Yasu Fuji | 1 | 63 |
| 20 | Oki Shikina | 1 | 63 |
| 20 | Black Gordman | 1 | 63 |
| 20 | Great Goliath | 1 | 63 |
| 24 | Omar Atlas | 1 | 53 |
| 25 | Steve Bolus | 1 | 52¤ |
| 25 | Steve Kovacs | 1 | 52¤ |
| 27 | Tom Andrews | 6 | 49 |
| 27 | Ron Starr | 2 | 49 |
| 29 | Tank Patton | 2 | 31¤ |
| 30 | Jesse Ventura | 1 | 30 |
| 31 | George Scott | 1 | 28 |
| 31 | Sandy Scott | 1 | 28 |
| 33 | Baron Von Raschke | 1 | 21 |
| 33 | Maurice Vachon | 1 | 21 |
| 35 | Alexis Smirnoff | 1 | 18 |
| 36 | Bob Geigel | 4 | 16¤ |
| 37 | Al Mills | 4 | 4¤ |
| 38 | Pedro Gordy) | 1 | 3¤ |
| 38 | Nelson Royal | 1 | 3¤ |
| 39 | Great Togo | 2 | 2¤ |
| 39 | Rufus R. Jones | 2 | 2¤ |
| 39 | Buck Robley | 2 | 2¤ |
| 39 | Tokyo Joe|Tokyo Joe | 2 | 2¤ |
| 39 | Bobby Becker | 2 | 2¤ |
| 39 | George Becker | 2 | 2¤ |
| 46 | Jerry Blackwell | 1 | 1¤ |
| 46 | Blue Yankee | 1 | 1¤ |
| 46 | Danny Little Bear | 1 | 1¤ |
| 46 | Ken Lucas | 1 | 1¤ |
| 46 | Ted Oates | 1 | 1¤ |
| 46 | Akio Sato | 1 | 1¤ |
| 46 | Kevin Sullivan | 1 | 1¤ |
| 46 | Reggie Lisowski | 2 | 1¤ |
| 46 | Art Neilson | 2 | 1¤ |
| 46 | Dennis Clary | 1 | 1¤ |
| 46 | Ron Etchison | 1 | 1¤ |
53
| 53 | Babe Zaharias | 1 | ¤ |
| 53 | Chris Zaharias | 1 | ¤ |
| 53 | Lou Newman | 1 | ¤ |
| 53 | Hans Schnabel | 1 | ¤ |
| 53 | Guy Brunetti | 1 | ¤ |
| 53 | Joe Tangaro | 1 | ¤ |
| 53 | Ivan Kalmikoff | 1 | ¤ |
| 53 | Karol Kalmikoff | 1 | ¤ |

== See also ==
- National Wrestling Alliance
- NWA World Tag Team Championship
- NWA Central States Tag Team Championship
- NWA North American Tag Team Championship

== Concurrent championships ==
Sources for 13 simultaneous NWA World Tag Team Championships

- NWA World Tag Team Championship (Los Angeles version)
- NWA World Tag Team Championship (San Francisco version)
- NWA World Tag Team Championship (Central States version)
- NWA World Tag Team Championship (Chicago version)
- NWA World Tag Team Championship (Buffalo Athletic Club version)
- NWA World Tag Team Championship (Georgia version)
- NWA World Tag Team Championship (Iowa/Nebraska version)
- NWA World Tag Team Championship (Indianapolis version)
- NWA World Tag Team Championship (Salt Lake Wrestling Club version)
- NWA World Tag Team Championship (Amarillo version)
- NWA World Tag Team Championship (Minneapolis version)
- NWA World Tag Team Championship (Texas version)
- NWA World Tag Team Championship (Mid-America version)
