= Tom Andrews (wrestler) =

American professional wrestler (1937–2020)

Personal information
- Born: Thomas Andersen; June 20, 1937 Salt Lake City, Utah, United States
- Died: September 1, 2020 (aged 83)

Professional wrestling career
- Ring name(s): Tom Andrews; The Claw; Intern #2; Medic #2; Scorpion; Super Intern; Ray Clark
- Trained by: Guy Brunetti
- Debut: 1960s
- Retired: 1980s

Thomas Andersen (June 20, 1937 – September 1, 2020) was an American professional wrestler known as Tom Andrews and The Claw. He worked in various territories, notably in Kansas City, and St. Louis.

== Personal life and death ==
Andrews died on September 1, 2020, at 83 from years of health issues.

== Championships and accomplishments ==
- American Wrestling Association
  - AWA Midwest Heavyweight Championship (1 time)
  - AWA Midwest Tag Team Championship (1 times) – with Rock Rogowski (1) and Ox Baker (1)
- Central States Wrestling / World Wrestling Alliance
  - NWA World Tag Team Championship (Central States version) (6 times) with Intern # 1 (4), Tank Patton (1) and Mike George (1)
- NWA Tri-State
  - NWA Tri-State Tag Team Championship (3 times) - with Medic #2
- Pacific Northwest Wrestling
  - NWA Pacific Northwest Heavyweight Championship (1 time)
  - NWA Pacific Northwest Tag Team Championship (1 time) - with Beauregarde (wrestler)
