= Professional wrestling in Canada =

The history of professional wrestling in Canada dates back to the founding of Maple Leaf Wrestling, which opened in 1930 and was the first known professional wrestling company in the country. Many Canadian wrestlers including Bret Hart, Roddy Piper, Edge, Chris Jericho and Trish Stratus have gone on to achieve worldwide success.

Culturally, Canadian wrestling has been an overspill of American wrestling with a generally similar ring style and business methodology. Four major National Wrestling Alliance (NWA) territories were based out of Montreal, Toronto, Calgary, and Vancouver each (with a lesser fifth booking office in Moncton). By the mid 1980s, Titan Sports, the parent company of the World Wrestling Federation (WWF), had bought out the first three territories (although Calgary was later sold back to its previous owner) and the fourth was in terminal decline. Montreal and Toronto would become major WWF cities, both hosting pay per view events for the company in the 1990s and 2000s.

== Notable promotions ==
=== NWA Territories era ===
- Stampede Wrestling (Alberta)
- Maple Leaf Wrestling (Ontario)
- Grand Prix Wrestling (New Brunswick, Prince Edward Island, Nova Scotia)
- Grand Prix Wrestling (Quebec)
- Lutte Internationale (Quebec)
- NWA All-Star Wrestling (British Columbia)
- Northland Wrestling Enterprises (Ontario)

=== Independents ===
- Alpha-1 Wrestling
- Border City Wrestling
- Elite Canadian Championship Wrestling
- High Impact Wrestling
- International Wrestling Syndicate
- Maple Leaf Pro Wrestling
- Mystery Wrestling
- Northern Championship Wrestling
  - NCW Femmes Fatales
- Smash Wrestling

== Bilinguality ==
Canada is an English/French bilingual country and French is the dominant language in Quebec, home of the old Grand Prix Wrestling and Lutte Internationale promotions. Accordingly this territory used both languages with dual language ring announcements, separate English and French commented broadcasts and either language used for promotional interviews. This tradition was continued later by the WWF on Canadian television with its French language segment Le Brunch de Pat hosted in French by veteran wrestler Pat Patterson either translating interviews from English speaking guests or else conversing in French with Francophone wrestlers.

Many professional wrestling terms used in Quebec French differ radically from those used in professional wrestling in France, such as for example tag team wrestling which is called "combat par équipe" in Quebec but "Catch á Quatre" in France. or the falls of a Best of three falls match which are called "Chutes" in Quebec and "Manches" in France. This extends even to the point of using different terms – "lutte" versus "catch" – for professional wrestling itself.

== Canadian wrestlers overseas ==
Note: † denotes wrestler is deceased

- A-1
- Abdullah the Butcher
- Adam Copeland/Edge
- Akam
- Ava (via her father and grandfather)
- Jason Anderson
- John Anson
- Fred Atkins †
- "Speedball" Mike Bailey
- Ben Bassarab
- Chris Benoit †
- Brute Bernard †
- Sinn Bodhi
- Rick Bognar †
- Bob Boyer
- Max Boyer
- Dino Bravo †
- Tyler Breeze
- Eric Young
- Ethan Page
- Josh Alexander
- Gino Brito
- Farmer Brooks †
- Traci Brooks
- Bulldog Bob Brown †
- Kerry Brown †
- Leo Burke †
- Samson Burke
- Don Callis
- George Cannon †
- Christian (Cage)
- Melissa Coates †
- Carly Colón (through his mother)
- Steve Corino
- Crazzy Steve
- Dave McKigney †
- Scott D'Amore
- Paul Diamond
- Shawn Spears
- John Quinn †
- René Duprée
- Ron Garvin
- George Gordienko †
- Archie Gouldie †
- Johnny Powers †
- Chelsea Green
- Sylvain Grenier
- Hart wrestling family
  - Stu Hart †
  - Smith Hart †
  - Bruce Hart
  - Keith Hart
  - Dean Hart †
  - Bret Hart
  - Owen Hart †
  - Natalya
  - Teddy Hart
  - Davey Boy Smith Jr.
- Chris Jericho
- Dwayne "The Rock" Johnson (through his father)
- Rocky Johnson †
- Billy Red Lyons †
- Tyson Kidd
- Gail Kim
- Ricky Hunter†
- Gene Kiniski †
- Klondike Bill †
- Ivan Koloff †
- Killer Karl Krupp †
- Killer Kowalski †
- Brock Lesnar (dual citizenship)
- Angelina Love
- The Spoiler †
- Whipper Billy Watson †
- Jinder Mahal
- Michael Elgin
- Santino Marella
- Rick Martel
- Rosa Mendes
- The Missing Link †
- Geeto Mongol †
- Kenny Omega
- John Hill †
- Kyle O'Reilly
- Maryse Ouellet
- Pierre-Carl Ouellet
- Kevin Owens
- Ethan Page
- Tony Parisi †
- Pat Patterson †
- Roddy Piper †
- Lanny Poffo †
- Mighty John Quinn (aka The Kentucky Butcher) †
- Bobby Roode
- Joe E. Legend
- Jacques Rougeau
- Raymond Rougeau
- Ruffy Silverstein
- Sandy Scott †
- Mike Sharpe †
- Tiger Ali Singh
- Tiger Joe Tomasso †
- Lance Storm
- Trish Stratus
- Robert Evans
- John Tenta †
- Johnny Devine
- Test †
- Luna Vachon †
- Maurice "Mad Dog" Vachon †
- Paul "Butcher" Vachon †
- Taya Valkyrie
- Vampiro
- Val Venis
- Petey Williams
- Sami Zayn
- Tyson Dux
- Waldo Von Erich †
- Yvon Robert †
- Bobby Nelson †
- Skull Murphy †
- Hans Schmidt †
- Kurt Von Hess †
- Sailor White †

== See also ==
- Canadian Death Tour
- Montreal Screwjob
