= Jim Brunzell =

American professional wrestler (born 1949)

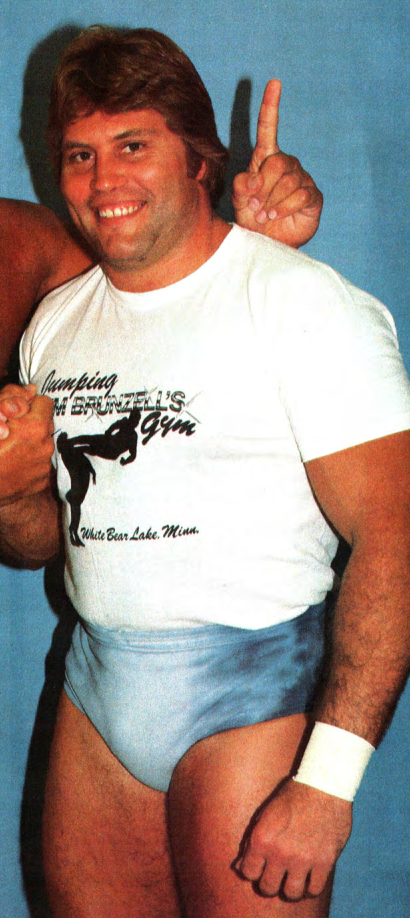
- Brunzell in 1983

Personal information
- Born: James Brunzell; August 13, 1949 (age 76) Minneapolis, Minnesota, U.S.
- Education: University of Minnesota
- Spouse: Mary Iten (m. 1975)
- Children: 2

Professional wrestling career
- Ring name(s): Jim Brunzell "Jumping" Jim Brunzell
- Billed height: 5 ft 10 in (178 cm)
- Billed weight: 235 lb (107 kg)
- Billed from: White Bear Lake, Minnesota
- Trained by: Verne Gagne; Billy Robinson
- Debut: December 27, 1972
- Retired: 2000

James Brunzell (born August 13, 1949), best known under the ring name "Jumping" Jim Brunzell, is an American retired professional wrestler known for his successful tag teams, Brunzell performed for various wrestling promotions during his 21-year career.

== Early life ==
The son of a United States Navy pilot, Brunzell lived in Memphis, Tennessee for a time as a child. Brunzell attended high school in White Bear Lake, Minnesota, where he participated in multiple sports including American football, scholastic wrestling, and athletics. He was a state champion in the high jump while in high school. He attended the University of Minnesota, where he continued to play football and high jump. During college, he had a tryout with the Washington Redskins as a tight end. He then returned to college to finish his degree.

== Professional wrestling career ==
=== American Wrestling Association (1972–1979) ===
Following his unsuccessful tryout with the Redskins, Brunzell was approached by former college football teammate Greg Gagne, who convinced him to train as a professional wrestler. He trained with Gagne's father Verne, alongside wrestlers including Ric Flair, Ken Patera, and The Iron Sheik.

In late-1972, Brunzell debuted in Gagne's promotion, the American Wrestling Association (AWA).

While working for the AWA, Brunzell also appeared in various National Wrestling Alliance territories in the early 1970s, most notably in the NWA Central States promotion. There, he teamed with Mike George to win the NWA Central States Tag Team Championship on October 25, 1973.

In May 1974, Brunzell formed a tag team with Greg Gagne known as "The High Flyers". The duo won the AWA World Tag Team Championship on July 7, 1977, by defeating Blackjack Lanza and Bobby Duncum. They held the championship for more than a year, until September 23, 1978, when they were stripped of the championship as Brunzell had suffered an injury.

Brunzell left the AWA in May 1979.

=== Jim Crockett Promotions (1979–1980) ===
In May 1979, Brunzell transferred to the Carolinas-based Jim Crockett Promotions, where he twice won the NWA Mid-Atlantic Heavyweight Championship. He left Jim Crockett Promotions in November 1980 and did a tour in Japan in December 1980.

=== Return to American Wrestling Association (1981–1985) ===
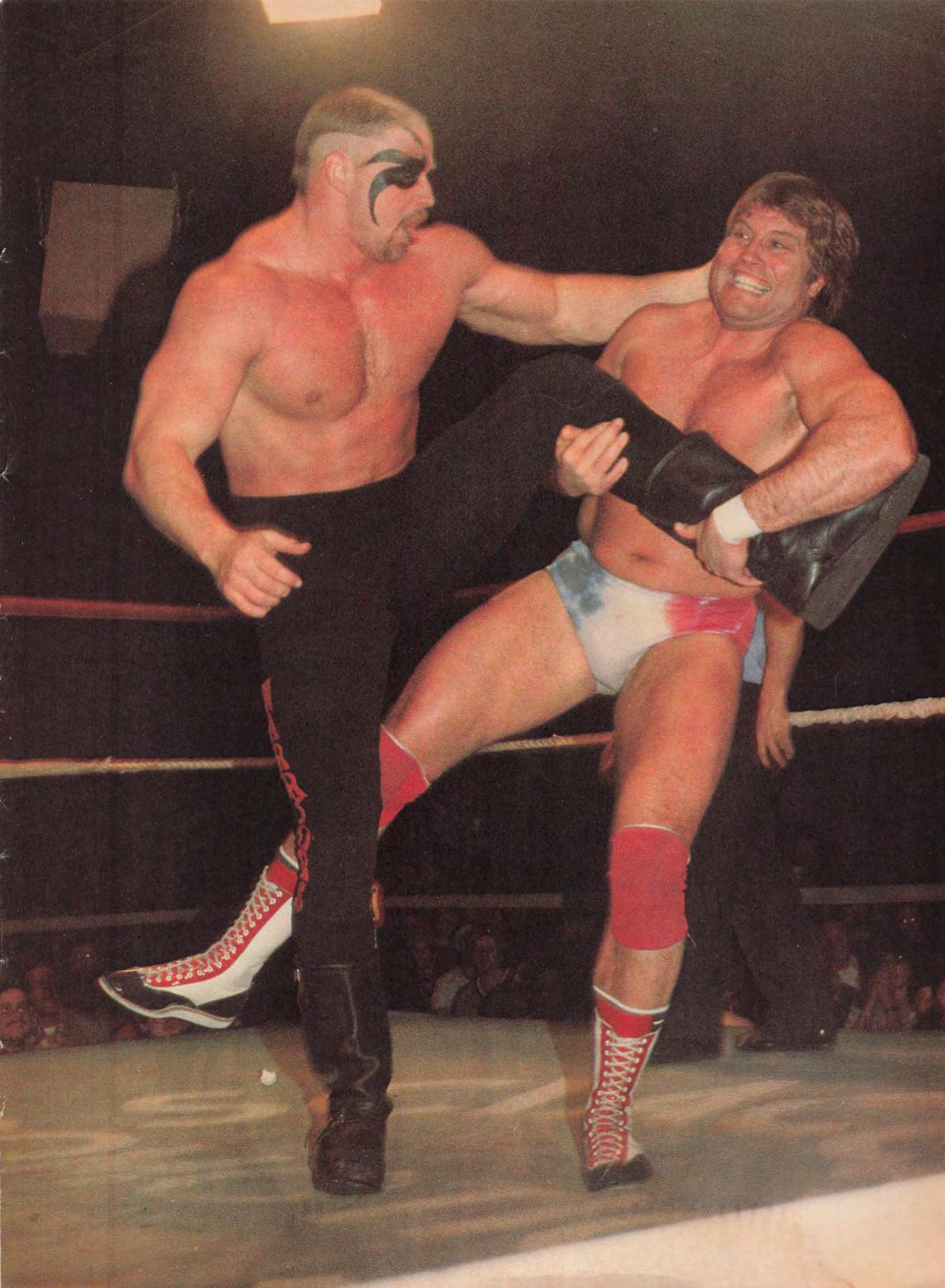
Brunzell (right) hits a legsweep on Road Warrior Hawk (right), c. 1985.

Brunzell returned to the American Wrestling Association in January 1981, reforming the High Flyers with Greg Gagne. On June 14, The High Flyers regained the AWA World Tag Team Championship by defeating The East-West Connection (Jesse Ventura and Adrian Adonis).

From 1983 to 1985, Brunzell wrestled in Montreal for Lutte Internationale.

Brunzell left the AWA once more in June 1985.

=== World Wrestling Federation (1985–1993) ===
==== The Killer Bees (1985–1988) ====
In June 1985, Brunzell joined the World Wrestling Federation (WWF) as its continued its national expansion. He was paired with another WWF newcomer, Brian Blair (though, Blair had already wrestled in the WWF before) as The Killer Bees. The Killer Bees were faces, but were original as the first faces to wear masks and switch places behind the referee's back. Brunzell and Blair had moderate success in the WWF. They feuded with such teams as The Hart Foundation as well as the Funks, Jimmy Jack Funk and Hoss Funk, whom they faced in front of over 74,000 fans at The Big Event. Their stay was also highlighted with a match against Nikolai Volkoff and The Iron Sheik as part of WrestleMania III, and a win at the inaugural Survivor Series on Thanksgiving Day 1987. The Killer Bees teamed together until they were separated off-screen by the management team. Their final match came against The Young Stallions on August 28, 1988.

==== Singles competition (1988–1993) ====
Following the breakup of Killer Bees, Brunzell was immediately programmed into a house show series with the newly arrived Curt Hennig that began in September and began working mainly as a jobber, while having a "jobber to the stars" status. Brunzell was winless against Mr. Perfect, including a singles match that aired on Prime Time Wrestling on October 4, 1988. On September 24, Brunzell gained his first victory in a nascent singles career when he defeated Danny Davis in Lexington, Kentucky. The following month Brunzell was shifted to house show matches against another newly arrived wrestler in the WWF, Terry Taylor. Again, Brunzell was winless in competition against Taylor, as well as King Haku. Brunzell was still known for one of the best dropkicks in the WWF, and in a losing match against Randy Savage, the Macho Man got a bloody mouth after getting hit by one.

On the November 5, 1988, edition of Prime Time Wrestling, Jim Brunzell was announced as a participant in the Survivor Series, replacing Don Muraco. His former partner B. Brian Blair was also placed on the show, replacing The Junkyard Dog. Despite this seeming boost, Brunzell continued to struggle on television. He was defeated again by Curt Hennig on Prime Time Wrestling, as well as by King Haku. At the 1988 Survivor Series Brunzell was pinned by Bad News Brown; however, his team did come out victorious. After this Brunzell took a sabbatical from the company.

In 1989 Brunzell would only wrestle twice in the WWF, defeating "Iron" Mike Sharpe in June and losing to Bad News Brown in November. The following year he made a full-time return and defeated Frenchy Martin on his first match back on February 18, 1990, in Chicago, IL. Brunzell however was now an opening level wrestler, albeit one with strong name recognition. He entered into an unsuccessful house show series with Rick Martel in April, while making his return to television on the May 14 edition of Prime Time Wrestling in a match against Curt Hennig. As he entered the summer he would appear on television against Dino Bravo and The Orient Express. On the July 16, 1990, edition of Prime Time Wrestling he finally gained his first televised victory since the breakup of the Killer Bees when he pinned Black Bart.

All traces of his former Killer Bees gimmick were now gone, and Brunzell would wear tie-dye trunks, adopted the "Crank It Up" theme song that had been used by The Young Stallions and was still being used by Jim Powers. It was with Powers that Brunzell would team with on August 6, 1990, on Prime Time Wrestling against Power and Glory (Powers's only televised match against his former partner). This month was also Brunzell's most successful since 1988, as he scored victories against Buddy Rose, Steve Lombardi, and Bob Bradley. He continued to fare well against opening level competition throughout the fall and winter.

Brunzell's appearances became much more limited in 1991 as he wrestled only seventeen dates, all winless efforts against upper-level competition like Irwin R. Schyster, The Warlord, and The Barbarian. However, in 1992 he became a regular again and made his first television appearance in over a year when he appeared in a battle royal that aired on Prime Time Wrestling on April 20. Brunzell began tag-teaming consistently again for the first time in almost four years when he replaced the departed Jim Neidhart and teamed with Owen Hart. Hart and Brunzell were victorious in multiple encounters against The Beverly Brothers in March. Brunzell also received a non-title match against WWF World Champion Ric Flair on the March to WrestleMania show.

The teaming with Owen was short-lived, and Brunzell returned to singles competition as spring commenced. Brunzell was victorious in two dark match tryouts for Rochester Roadblock in April and appeared in a 40-man battle royal that aired on Prime Time Wrestling in June 1992. That month Brunzell began teaming with Jim Powers once more, losing to The Beverly Brothers and The Nasty Boys, and defeating Duane Gill and Barry Hardy. Later that summer he returned once more to singles competition, facing Paul Diamond, Skinner, and Steve Lombardi. On October 5, 1992, edition of Prime Time Wrestling Brunzell faced Terry Taylor in the latter's return to the WWF.

On the January 3, 1993, edition of Prime Time Wrestling Brunzell received a shot against Intercontinental Champion Shawn Michaels. A day later he wrestled on the international version of WWF Superstars and scored his first televised victory of the year when he pinned Bill Irwin. In February 1993 he was programmed into a house show series against The Predator (Horace Hogan) and was again victorious in every encounter. However, despite hoping to work for the WWF as a producer/booker for the WWF, he wrestled his final WWF match in April 1993, episode of Monday Night Raw where he was defeated by newcomer Damien Demento.

=== Universal Wrestling Federation (1991, 1993) ===
He also wrestled for Herb Abrams' Universal Wrestling Federation (UWF) in 1991. While there, he reunited with B. Brian Blair under the name Masked Confusion, winning the tag team title twice. They also returned to UWF in 1993.

=== Late career (1993–2000) ===
Brunzell left WWF in 1993 and competed on the independent circuit, primarily in the Chicago area.

On May 23, 1993, Brunzell wrestled at World Championship Wrestling's inaugural Slamboree pay-per-view in a six-man tag match alongside fellow "legends" Wahoo McDaniel and Blackjack Mulligan against Dick Murdoch, Don Muraco, and "Superfly" Jimmy Snuka. In 1994, he appeared in the American Wrestling Federation as a guest referee in a bout for the AWF Heavyweight Championship, in which Tito Santana beat Bob Orton Jr. to win the title.

Brunzell wrestled his final professional wrestling match in 2000 on the "Wrestle America 2000" event held on Corcoran, Minnesota, with Derrick Dukes against Bill Irwin and Chuck The New Age Farmer in a winning effort for Brunzell and Dukes.

== Personal life ==
Since retiring from wrestling, Brunzell works in sales. He is also involved in activities with his local church and does charity work for children with diabetes. Brunzell makes frequent appearances at conventions with long-time tag team partner Brian Blair.

In July 2016, Brunzell was named part of a class action lawsuit filed against WWE which alleged that wrestlers incurred traumatic brain injuries during their tenure and that the company concealed the risks of injury. The suit is litigated by attorney Konstantine Kyros, who has been involved in a number of other lawsuits against WWE. The lawsuit was dismissed by US District Judge Vanessa Lynne Bryant in September 2018. In September 2020, an appeal for the lawsuit dismissed by a federal appeals court.

As of November 2017, Brunzell and Blair work many comic conventions and independent autograph sessions. A comic book series called the "Killer Bees" has been released.

== Championships and accomplishments ==
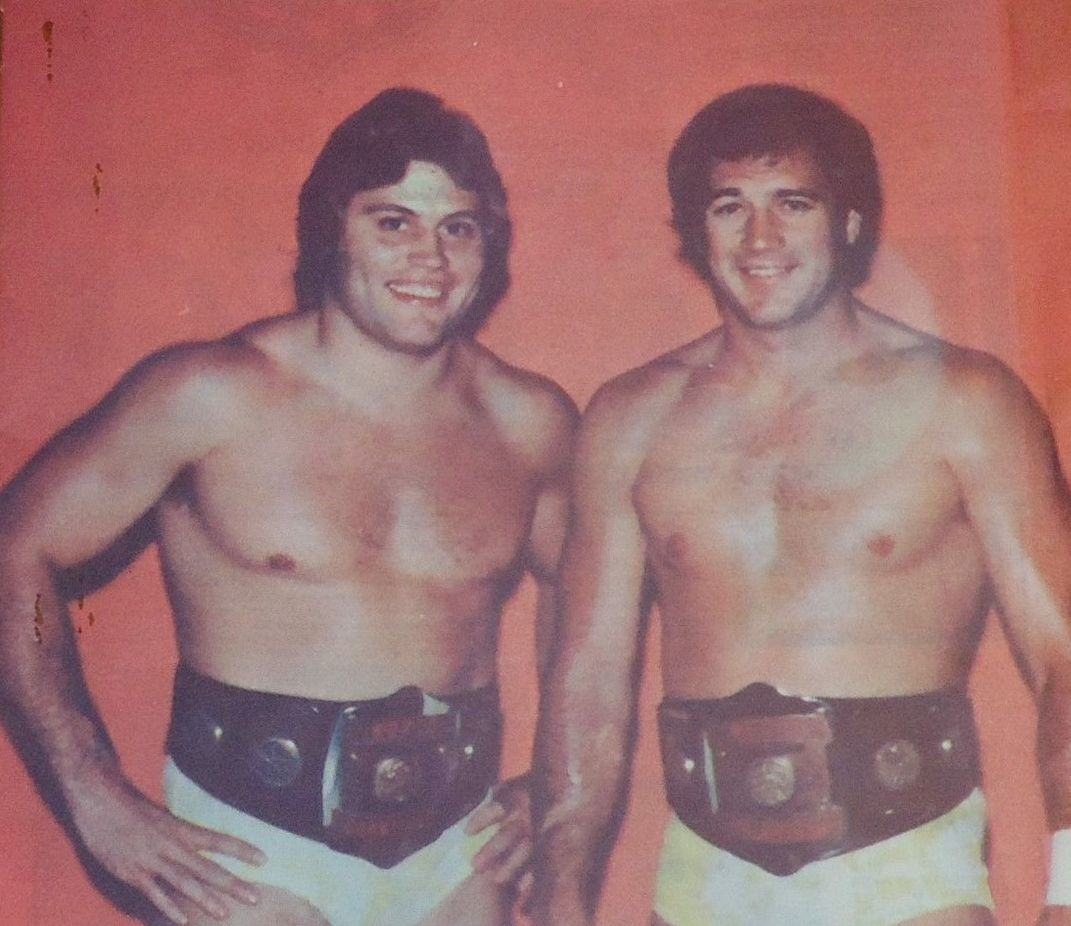
Brunzell was a two-time AWA World Tag Team Champion with Greg Gagne.

- American Wrestling Association
  - AWA World Tag Team Championship (2 times) – with Greg Gagne
- Cauliflower Alley Club
  - Tag Team Award (2016) - with Greg Gagne
- Central States Wrestling
  - NWA World Tag Team Championship (Central States version) (2 times) – with Mike George
- George Tragos/Lou Thesz Professional Wrestling Hall of Fame
  - Frank Gotch Award (2013)
- Jim Crockett Promotions
  - NWA Mid-Atlantic Heavyweight Championship (2 times)
- Nu-Age Wrestling
  - NAW Light Heavyweight Championship (1 time)
- Pro Wrestling Illustrated
  - PWI ranked him 180 of the 500 best singles wrestlers during the "PWI Years" in 2003.
  - PWI ranked him 49 of the 100 best tag teams during the "PWI Years" with Greg Gagne.
  - PWI Tag Team of the Year award with Greg Gagne in 1982.
- Universal Wrestling Federation
  - UWF World Tag Team Championship (1 time) – with Brian Blair
- West Four Wrestling Alliance
  - WFWA Canadian Heavyweight Championship (1 time)
- World Wrestling Federation
  - $5,000 Battle Royal winner (with B. Brian Blair)
  - Frank Tunney Sr. Memorial Tag Team Tournament (1987) with B. Brian Blair
- World Wrestling Council
  - WWC Caribbean Tag Team Championship (1 time) - with Greg Gagne

== See also ==
- The Killer Bees
