= Chi Chi Cruz =

Canadian professional wrestler

Personal information
- Born: Corey Peloquin; October 3, 1968 (age 57) Hartney, Manitoba, Canada

Professional wrestling career
- Ring name(s): Bobby Bolton; C.C. Quinn; Carnage; Chi Chi Cruz; Donald Duck
- Billed height: 6 ft 1 in (1.85 m)
- Billed weight: 235 lb (107 kg); 243 lb (110 kg)
- Billed from: Winnipeg, Manitoba; East Los Angeles, California
- Trained by: Ernest Rheault
- Debut: September 25, 1986
- Retired: 2015

Corey Peloquin (born October 3, 1968, in Hartney, Manitoba) is a Canadian professional wrestler who is known for working the independent promotions such as Extreme Canadian Championship Wrestling, Real Action Wrestling, Atlantic Grand Prix Wrestling, IWA-Mid South, All-Star Wrestling, and United States Wrestling Association as Chi Chi Cruz. Cruz worked in such countries as Germany and South Africa in addition to Canada and United States. He is also the cousin of wrestler Fred "Puppy Dog" Peloquin.

== Early life ==
Cruz was born in Winnipeg, Manitoba. While growing up Cruz watched the American Wrestling Association. He would also watch such wrestlers as Nick Bockwinkel, Rick Martel, The High Flyers, The Road Warriors, Hulk Hogan, and Jesse "The Body" Ventura.

Throughout high school Cruz was a part of the basketball and baseball teams.

== Career ==
=== Early career (1986–1990) ===
Cruz was trained by Ernest Rheault, then went on to make his debut in 1986 for Central Canadian Pro Wrestling. In January 1989 when Cruz was 20, he would move onto All-Star Wrestling out of Vancouver, British Columbia ran by Al Tomko.

=== Atlantic Grand Prix Wrestling (1990–1996) ===
In 1990, Cruz would make his way to Eastern Canada and would work for Atlantic Grand Prix Wrestling where he would he mild success by teaming up with "Bulldog" Bob Brown and capturing the AGPW Tag Team Championships. In AGPW, he would capture the AGPW Continental Championship.

=== World Wrestling Federation (1991) ===
Cruz had a match in Calgary, Alberta at the Olympic Saddledome on July 8 taped for the July 22 episode of WWF Prime Time Wrestling. Cruz teamed with Bob Jones in a losing effort to the Beverly Brothers. On July 9, the World Wrestling Federation had taped three weeks of WWF Superstars of Wrestling at Northlands Coliseum in Edmonton, Alberta. On the episode that aired on July 27, Cruz lost to The Bezerker. On the episode that aired on August 10, Irwin R. Schyster defeated Cruz in 1:45 after hitting the Stock Market Crash.

=== United States Wrestling Association (1996–1997) ===
In 1996, he went down to the United States Wrestling Association in Memphis, Tennessee, where he wrestled under the name Bobby Bolton. While in the USWA, he had a heated feud with Mike Samples

=== Return to Atlantic Grand Prix Wrestling (1998–2000) ===
In 1998, he would return to AGPW and feud with fellow Canadian Joe E. Legend.

=== Germany (1999) ===
In the fall 1999, Cruz would compete in a tournament Hanover, Germany.

=== Return to Independent Circuit (1999–2004) ===
Cruz would work in independent promotions in Nova Scotia, Manitoba, and Alberta. The major two promotions were No Holds Barred in Winnipeg and Real Action Wrestling in Halifax.

=== Premier Championship Wrestling (2002–2004) ===
On August 22, 2002, Cruz debuted with Winnipeg-based Premier Championship Wrestling where he routinely defended his Maritime-based Real Action Wrestling Heavyweight Championship. He soon joined "The Dynasty", a group consisting of "Mecca" Shane Madison and manager (and PCW's then-booker) Michael Davidson. On November 21, 2002, Cruz injured his neck tumbling from the ring to the floor. Initially believed to be seriously hurt, Cruz was rushed to a local medical facility via ambulance. Despite the injury and ignoring doctor's orders to rest for several weeks, Cruz returned to action 4 days later and, as a result, was widely cheered though he was ostensibly a heel. This caused issues between Cruz & his Dynasty partner Madison while Davidson attempted to keep the group together. Cruz ended 2002 being voted PCW's Wrestler of the Year by the fans.

In 2003, Cruz faced Madison in a Best of Seven series to crown the first ever PCW Heavyweight Champion. The series was competed at all three of PCW's weekly venues. Cruz won the first match on January 16, 2003 while Madison won the next three matches to take a commanding 3-1 lead. Cruz rallied and on January 30, 2003, defeated Madison in the deciding match seven to become the first ever PCW Heavyweight Champion. Mike Davidson, the manager of both men, hedged his bets by supporting both, Cruz fired him following his championship victory, cementing himself as a babyface. One week later, he was presented with the championship belt (a modified UFC replica). As champion, Cruz engaged in heated programs with Mad Man Williams, "Canadian Idol" Chris Stevens and others, before his most prominent feud with veteran Canadian wrestler "Outlaw" Adam Knight.

==== Feud with Adam Knight ====
On March 27, 2003, PCW held a Battle Royale to determine a new number one contender to Cruz's championship. Kenny Omega eliminated Adam Knight to win. On April 3, 2003, Cruz faced Kenny Omega for the first time, the match ending in a No Contest when Knight interfered. Cruz & Omega would then team together to face Knight & Mad Man Williams.

The feud also included tag team matches where Cruz teamed with Sarah Stock to face Knight & Williams.

On April 24, 2003, Cruz defeated Knight in controversial fashion. Knight had pinned Cruz to seemingly win the PCW Heavyweight Championship but the official rescinded his decision when he saw Cruz's foot on the ropes. He re-started the match and Cruz was victorious. Enraged, Knight attacked Cruz and stole the PCW Championship belt. On May 22, Knight agreed to return the belt in exchange for a re-match with a stipulation of his choosing at PCW's next major event, Beat The Summer Heat. On May 29, Knight attacked Cruz following his victory over Antonio Scorpio, breaking Cruz's arm in the process.

On July 10, Cruz defeated Knight in a bloody 15 Foot Steel Chain match at PCW's Beat The Summer Heat.

==== Loss of Championship and Exit from PCW ====
In August, PCW's booker Mike Davidson abruptly quit the promotion to start a new group called Action Wrestling Entertainment. PCW's co-founder Andrew Shallcross became booker and sought to elevate Omega to the championship. a decision with which Cruz disagreed. On September 18, 2003, Cruz failed to show up for his scheduled title defense against Omega, prompting Shallcross to strip him of the PCW Championship and award it to the winner of Omega vs Knight (which Omega won). One week later, Cruz returned to PCW citing the flu for the reason he missed his title defense. He faced Omega and lost via submission, leaving the promotion for over a year.

==== Return to PCW ====
Cruz briefly returned to Premier Championship Wrestling in November 2004, first facing Sarah Stock while wearing a mask and performing as Dr. X and then challenging Adam Knight for the PCW Heavyweight Championship. Knight was poised to break Cruz's PCW title longevity record of 231 days by taking the night off, when Cruz showed up unannounced to challenge him. Knight was victorious.

==== Hall of Fame ====
On March 31, 2017, Chi Chi Cruz was inducted into the PCW Hall of Fame by Marty Gold.

=== Action Wrestling Entertainment (2003–2006) ===
On November 19, 2003, Action Wrestling Entertainment (AWE), a new project headed in part by former Premier Championship Wrestling founder/booker Mike Davidson, debuted in Winnipeg with Chi Chi Cruz as a featured performer.

On the debut event, Cruz teamed with his former rival "Outlaw" Adam Knight in a losing cause against "Mecca" Shane Madison & Buff Bagwell.

During his time in AWE, Cruz worked primarily in tag teams, first with Knight and later with Alberta-based Massive Damage.

=== Steeltown Pro Wrestling (2009–2010) ===
On June 13, 2009, SPW held Fan Appreciation Day in Transcona, Manitoba Cruz competed in a Battle Royal which included veterans and top SPW Stars to determine a new SPW Heavyweight Champion. Rob Stardom eliminated Bobby Jay to become the SPW Heavyweight Champion. Earlier in the show Cruz teamed up with Bobby Fox to defeat Big Sexy Beasts.

==== Feud with Rob Stardom ====
On August 8, 2009, at "Red River Rumble" in Selkirk, Manitoba, Cruz beat TRCW Championship "Really Crazy" Rob Stardom in a non-title match. After Cruz's non-title victory, this started a feud with Stardom as he hit Cruz with the TRCW Championship at "Mountain Mania" on September 19 which Marius to pick up the win. Stardom and Cruz faced off against either in a match at "Hurt So Good 2009" which took place on November 21. Stardom was able to pick up the victory after Cruz was disqualified. At "Christmas Castrophe 2009" which held on December 29, Cruz and Stardom faced each other again in a No Disqualification match. Stardom once again picked up the victory after a masked man interfered in the match. At "Don't Back Down 2010" which took place on January 10, 2010, another match between Cruz and Stardom ended in a no contest due to inference from Marius, Drezden, Gibby Guerrero and Chip "The Kid" Fletcher. This led to a six man tag team match later in the show. Chip "the Kid" Fletcher, Chi Chi Cruz, and Gibby Guerrero defeated Rob Stardom, Drezden, and Marius. Six days later at "Fight Night 2010", Cruz defeated Stardom in a "Christmas Catastrophe" rematch. They continued their feud by having a dog collar match at "Raising the Stakes 2010" on February 20. The match went to a no contest after Marius interfered in the match multiple times. Cruz than challenged Stardom and Marius to a tag team match at the "SPW 2nd Anniversary Show" on April 17 in which he announced his partner would be Raven. On February 27 at "This One's Gonna Hurt", Stardom defeated Cruz. Later in the evening Matt Fairlane defeated Marius via disqualification due to Stardom interfering in the match. This led to a six-man tag team match in the main event. The team of Lucky O'Shea, Matt Fairlane, and Chi Chi Cruz defeated the team of Marius, Rob Stardom, and DOOM. At "Pump Up the Volume 2010" on March 19, Cruz defeated Stardom in the main event. The next day on March 20 at "Winnipeg Warfare 2010", the match between Cruz and Stardom went to a no content after interference by Marius, Matt Fairlane, and the rest of the SPW roster which led into battle royal. Matt Fairlane won the Main Event Battle Royal to earn a shot at the Cutting Edge Wrestling Intercities Championship. After winning the SPW Heavyweight Championship on March 27, Marius used his rematch clause to gain another opportunity at the title. The match would take place on April 3 at "War on the Shore" in Gimli, Manitoba. Due to Stardom's interference, Marius was able to beat Cruz become the first multiple time SPW Heavyweight Champion. Gibby Guerrero and Cruz challenge Stardom and Marius to a match later in the evening. Guerrero and Cruz defeated Stardom and Marius. At the "SPW 2nd Anniversary Show", declared the main event tag team match was to be contested under Raven's Rules. Raven and Cruz defeated Stardom and Marius. At "Mayhem in Morden" on May 14, Jethro Hawg, Chi Chi Cruz, and Johnny Falcon beat Rob Stardom, Marius, and Jay Beaver in the main event. Their feud still wasn't over yet. In a match between Chip "The Kid" Fletcher and Rob Stardom at "Anarchy in Arborg", the match went to a no contest. This led to a tag team match in the main event which Cruz and Fletcher defeat Stardom and Marius. Their feud finally came to end. At "Hurt So Good 2010", Cruz defeated Stardom in a blood filled "I Quit" match.

At Thanksgiving Thunder 2009 on October 10, Cruz had another opportunity at the SPW Heavyweight Championship in a Steeltown Showdown. Marius defeated Matt Fairlane, Rob Stardom, Chi Chi Cruz, Sgt. Tom Steele and Jerin Rose in the Steeltown Showdown to become the SPW Heavyweight Champion. It would be at "Slam-O-Rama" on March 27 in which Cruz would finally win the SPW Heavyweight Champion after defeating Marius. Later in the main event Cruz won the Ernie Rheault/Emil Grenier Invitational Battle Royal.

At "Halloweenpalooza 2" on October 15, 2010, Cruz was a participant in the Kerry Brown Memorial Tournament. In the first round Cruz defeated "Beautiful" Bobby Jay. In the second round, Cruz defeated Ike Idol in a chop off. In the finals Cruz defeated SYKO to win the tournament. Cruz quietly retired following this event.

=== Final Match ===
Cruz returned for one final match, December 4, 2015, for Winnipeg-based Canadian Wrestling's Elite, where he appeared in their 50 man Rumble.

== Championships and accomplishments ==
- Atlantic Grand Prix Wrestling
  - AGPW Continental Championship (1 time)
  - AGPW Tag Team Championship (1 time) with – "Bulldog" Bob Brown
- MainStream Wrestling Entertainment
  - MSWE Championship (1 time)
- Premier Championship Wrestling
  - PCW Heavyweight Championship (1 time)
- Real Action Wrestling
  - RAW Heavyweight Championship (1 time)
- Rough House Rasslin'
  - RHR Western Canadian Championship (1 time)
- Pro Wrestling Illustrated
  - PWI ranked him #339 of the 500 best singles wrestlers of the year in the PWI 500 in 1995
- Slam! Wrestling
  - Slam! Wrestling Canadian Hall of Fame
- Steeltown Pro Wrestling
  - SPW Heavyweight Championship (1 time)
  - Ernie Rheault/Emil Grenier Invitational Battle Royal
  - Kerry Brown Memorial Tournament (2010)
- West Four Wrestling Alliance
  - WFWA Canadian Heavyweight Championship (3 times)
