= Renegade Warriors =

Professional wrestling tag team

Tag team
- Members: Mark Youngblood; Chris Youngblood
- Name(s): The Renegade Warriors; The Tribal Nation; The Youngbloods
- Billed heights: Mark: 6 ft 0 in (1.83 m); Chris: 6 ft 0 in (1.83 m)
- Combined billed weight: 484 lb (220 kg)
- Hometown: Amarillo, Texas, U.S.
- Debut: 1985
- Years active: 1985–1997

The Renegade Warriors, also known as the Youngblood Brothers, were a professional wrestling tag team composed of brothers Mark (Mark Romero) and Chris Youngblood (Christopher Romero). They performed under the name "The Renegade Warriors" in All Japan Pro Wrestling (AJPW), World Championship Wrestling (WCW), World Class Championship Wrestling (WCCW), and the World Wrestling Council (WWC) and the name "Tribal Nation" in the Global Wrestling Federation (GWF). They are the sons of Ricky Romero and the brothers of Jay Youngblood.

== Professional wrestling career ==
=== World Class Championship Wrestling (1985–1986) ===
Mark and Chris Youngblood began teaming up in 1985, while in World Class Championship Wrestling. In September 1986, they were involved in a one-night tournament to determine new WCWA World Tag Team Champions; they defeated Jos LeDuc and Rick Rude in the first round, and defeated Ted and Jerry Oates in the quarterfinals, before losing the semifinals to Matt Borne and Buzz Sawyer, who would win the titles later that night.

=== World Wrestling Council (1986–1997) ===
Near the end of 1986, the Youngbloods went to Puerto Rico, to wrestle for the World Wrestling Council. On January 6, 1987, they won their first championship, the WWC World Tag Team Championship, defeating Ron and Chicky Starr. They would hold onto the belts until April 4, 1987, when they lost them to The Sheepherders, but regained the titles on May 10, 1987. Their second reign lasted two months, before losing them on July 11, 1987, to Mr. Pogo and TNT, but regained the titles on July 30, 1987. Their third reign lasted nearly a month before losing them to The Hunters (Dale Veasey and Bob Brown) on August 26, 1987, but regained the titles on September 20, 1987. Their fourth reign lasted until October 17, 1987, losing them to The Ninja Express (Mr. Pogo and Kendo Nagasaki).

In December 1987, they returned to WWC and Puerto Rico, and immediately won the WWC Caribbean Tag Team Championship, defeating The Samoans (Samu and Fatu). They would hold onto the titles for nearly two months, before losing them on February 6, 1988, to The New Kansas Jayhawks (Bobby Jaggers and Dan Kroffat), but regained the titles on April 23, 1988. On May 14, 1988, they defeated the Ninja Express to win their fifth World Tag Team title, making them double champions. But on June 11, 1988, they lost the Caribbean Tag Team titles back to the Kansas Jayhawks, and on July 23, 1988, lost the World Tag Team titles back to the Ninja Express.

On March 4, 1989, they won their third Caribbean Tag Team titles, but had to vacate the titles two days later. It would be until October when they regained some gold by winning their sixth World Tag Team title. Their sixth reign would last until February 1990. It would be over seven years before winning their last championship, their seventh World Tag Team title in August 1997. This reign would last until December.

=== All Japan Pro Wrestling (1987, 1992–1997) ===
In November 1987, the Youngbloods went to All Japan Pro Wrestling, to take part in their annual Real World Tag League; they finished sixth with two points, tying with Rusher Kimura and Goro Tsurumi, and The Terminator and Tom Zenk. The brothers wouldn't return until January 1992, and consistently toured with the promotion until July 1997. The Youngbloods were praised by AJPW mainstay Steve "Dr. Death" Williams for their in-ring ability.

=== World Championship Wrestling (1990–1991) ===
In April 1990, the Youngbloods signed with World Championship Wrestling as The Renegade Warriors. While in WCW, they would wrestle against the likes of The Midnight Express, The Fabulous Freebirds, The Nasty Boys, The State Patrol, Magnum Force, The Four Horsemen, and The Young Pistols.

=== Global Wrestling Federation (1991–1993) ===
After their WCW release in May 1991, the Youngbloods moved over the Global Wrestling Federation (GWF). In July 1991, they took part in a one-night tournament to determine the first GWF Tag Team Champions; they defeated El Cubano and Cuban Assassin in the quarterfinals, and defeated Bad News Allen and Big Bully Busick in the semi-finals, but lost to Rip Rogers and Scott Anthony in the finals.

In the spring of 1992, they began going by the team name The Tribal Nation, with Mark now called Nocona and Chris now called Brave Sky. That summer, they began a brutal rivalry with The California Connection (John Tatum and Rod Price) and their manager Gary Hart. The rivalry intensified when Tatum, Price, and Hart cut off Brave Sky's hair. The brothers gained revenge by cutting Tatum's hair.

After the feud with the California Connection ended, they feuded with John Hawk and a revolving door of partners including Black Bart and Bobby Duncum, Jr.

== Championships and accomplishments ==
- All Star Pro Wrestling
  - NWA Australasian Tag Team Championship (1 time)
- Pro Wrestling Illustrated
  - PWI ranked them # 100 of the 100 best tag teams of the PWI Years in 2003.
- World Wrestling Council
  - WWC Caribbean Tag Team Championship (3 times)
  - WWC World Tag Team Championship (7 times)
- World Wrestling's Superstars
  - WWS Tag Team Championship (2 times)
