= International Wrestling Alliance =

Canadian professional wrestling promotion

- Acronym: IWA
- Founded: 1973
- Defunct: 2000
- Style: Professional wrestling
- Headquarters: Manitoba, Canada
- Founder: Tony Condello
- Formerly: West Four Wrestling Alliance

The International Wrestling Alliance (IWA) was an independent professional wrestling promotion based in the province of Manitoba in Canada. It was initially founded as the West Four Wrestling Alliance (WFWA) in 1973 by Tony Condello, under which it ran until that name changed in 1994.

== Championships ==
Championship	Final champion(s)	Date won	Location
IWA Heavyweight Championship	Chi Chi Cruz	May 2000	Winnipeg, Manitoba, Canada
IWA Junior Heavyweight Championship	Último Dragón	November 14, 1995	Morris, Manitoba, Canada
IWA Tag Team Championship	J.T. Atlas and Kevin Martel	July 1997	Manitoba, Canada
WFWA Canadian Heavyweight Championship	Stan Saxton	July 24, 1994	Winnipeg, Manitoba, Canada
WFWA Canadian Tag Team Championship	Ghost Riders	November 1994	Winnipeg, Manitoba, Canada
WFWA Television Championship	"Bulldog" Bob Brown	April 14, 1991	Winnipeg, Manitoba, Canada

== IWA Alumni ==
The roster consisted of mostly Canadian wrestlers, but also included some American wrestlers.

=== Singles wrestlers ===
- Akim Singh
- "Bulldog" Bob Brown
- Chi Chi Cruz
- E.Z. Ryder
- Gerry Morrow
- Jim Brunzell
- Mad Dog Peloquin
- Male Nurse
- The Natural
- Ron Ritchie
- Stan Saxton
- Steve Rivers
- Lance Storm
- Chris Jericho
- Sexton Hardcastle
- Lenny St.Claire

=== Tag teams ===
- Bobby Jones & French Mad Dog
- Dave Gobeil & Tony Condello
- Earl the Orderly & The Male Nurse
- Ghost Riders (Chris Windham & Jackie Anderson)
