= Randy Hogan (wrestler) =

American professional wrestler

Personal information
- Born: Randy Muehl; June 27, 1952 Detroit, MI, US

Professional wrestling career
- Ring name: Randy Hogan
- Billed height: 6 ft 0 in (1.83 m)
- Billed weight: 220 lb (100 kg)
- Billed from: Tampa, FL
- Trained by: Jerry Oates; Ted Oates
- Debut: 1981
- Retired: 1994

Randy Muehl (born June 27, 1952) is a retired American professional wrestler, best known by his ring name Randy Hogan, who competed in North American promotions including the National Wrestling Alliance, the Florida Wrestling Federation and World Championship Wrestling from the early 1980s until the early 1990s.

== Professional wrestling career ==
=== Early career (1981–1987) ===
After making his debut in 1981, Randy Hogan competed in National Wrestling Alliance territories including the Continental Wrestling Association in the Southeastern United States and won a number of secondary titles, including the Alabama Junior Heavyweight Championship, the Georgia Junior Heavyweight Championship, the Florida Junior Heavyweight Championship, the Florida Heavyweight Championship, and the NWA Junior Heavyweight Championship.

=== National Wrestling Alliance – Jim Crockett Promotions (1988–1989) ===
On February 10, 1988 he joined Jim Crockett Promotions, which was quickly consolidating the remaining NWA promotions. Bearing a facial resemblance to then World Wrestling Federation champion Hulk Hogan and having grown a Hogan-esque mustache, the company took the opportunity to cast the look-a-like Randy Hogan as a jobber. He made his debut on the February 13 episode of World Championship Wrestling (WCW) when he teamed with Steve Atkinson and Gene Miller to take on Ivan Koloff and the Powers of Pain. Hogan appeared sporadically in the spring and summer, facing The Powers of Pain, Rick Steiner, The Midnight Express and others in various matches. On the December 31, 1988 edition of World Championship Wrestling, Hogan teamed with Mike Justice to face The Texas Broncos in Dustin Rhodes' debut match. His final match in his initial run was against The Road Warriors on the January 28, 1989 episode of World Championship Wrestling.

Randy achieved additional national fame by appearing in Pro Wrestling Illustrated alongside Jim Cornette, in a pose that echoed the famous photo of Hulk Hogan and Freddie Blassie.

=== World Wrestling Federation (1989 – 1990, 1993) ===
Four months later he jumped to the World Wrestling Federation (WWF). Having removed his Hogan-esque mustache, he adopted the ring name of Scott Colton and made his debut on May 21 episode of Wrestling Challenge and wrestled Dino Bravo. Colton was winless in his first year with the company, facing wrestlers such as Mr. Perfect, The Ultimate Warrior, Bad News Brown, and Ted DiBiase.

Entering 1990, he teamed with Chris Duffy in an unsuccessful effort against then-WWF Tag-Team Champions Demolition on the April 15th episode of Wrestling Challenge. He also faced Akeem, Earthquake, and Power & Glory in the year. His final match came on October 10, 1990 when he was defeated by The Warlord on Wrestling Challenge.[9] After a two year absence, he returned to team with Carl Armont to face The Headshrinkers on the January 10, 1993 episode of Wrestling Challenge.[10]

=== World Championship Wrestling (1993-1994) ===
Following an injury sustained in 1989, Randy took a sabbatical from professional wrestling. While recovering, he purchased the Cedar Creek Seafood restaurant. Eventually, he would expand his business to six locations. While managing the restaurants he received the opportunity to return to the now-rebranded World Championship Wrestling in 1993. Seeing it as an opportunity to further promote his restaurant, he made his return on November 14, 1993 in a match that aired on January 22, 1994 episode of WCW Worldwide. There he faced Vader, who had recently lost the WCW World Heavyweight Championship. On the April 4 episode of WCW Worldwide he teamed with P. J. Walker in a match against The Nasty Boys.

Ironically, while working for a local radio station he was dispatched as a reporter to cover the signing ceremony of Hulk Hogan on June 11, 1994, appearing on screen and fielding questions to WCW's latest acquisition.

== Personal life ==
He retired from pro wrestling in the 1990s. After selling off his franchises, in 2010 he opened another Cedar Creek Seafood restaurant in Lakeland, FL.
