= Don Callis =

Canadian professional wrestling manager (born 1963)

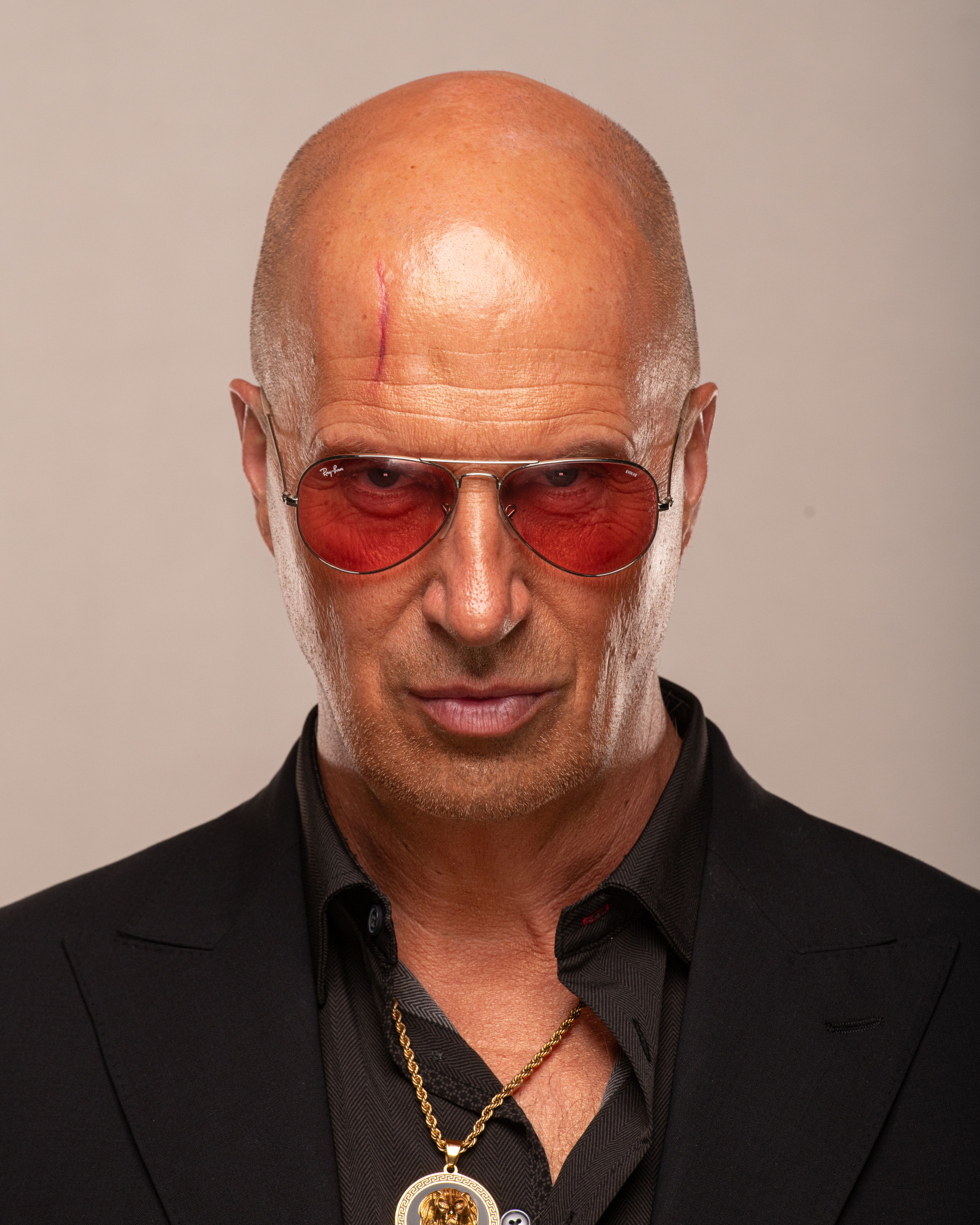
- Callis in 2023

Personal information
- Born: Donald Callis; October 13, 1963 (age 62) Winnipeg, Manitoba, Canada
- Education: University of Manitoba (BA, MBA)

Professional wrestling career
- Ring name(s): Cyrus; Cyrus the Virus; Don Callis; Don Casablancas; Lord Cyrus; Sidewinder Singh; The General; The Jackyl; The Natural
- Billed height: 6 ft 2 in (188 cm)
- Billed weight: 180 lb (82 kg)
- Billed from: Winnipeg, Manitoba, Canada
- Trained by: Tony Condello
- Debut: 1989

Donald Callis (born October 13, 1963) is a Canadian professional wrestling manager, color commentator, actor, and former professional wrestler and business executive. He is signed to All Elite Wrestling (AEW), where he works as the on-screen manager and leader of The Don Callis Family; as well as working as a backstage consultant for the company. He also works for Maple Leaf Pro Wrestling (MLP) as a colour commentator.

A former wrestler, Callis spent the majority of his career performing as either Cyrus (shortened from Cyrus the Virus) or Don Callis. He first gained international attention working under the name The Jackyl for the World Wrestling Federation (WWF). While in the WWF, Callis managed a group known as The Truth Commission and later managed The Oddities and The Acolytes before being released in 1999. From 1999 to 2001, he worked for Extreme Championship Wrestling (ECW) as a manager and commentator, during which he was portrayed as a fictional "network representative" who headed a group known as The Network. In 2003, Callis was introduced as an on-screen character of Management Consultant for Total Nonstop Action Wrestling (TNA) and held that role until 2004. He returned to the company in 2017 (the company then-named Impact Wrestling) as an executive vice president and commentator for the promotion. While with Impact, Callis also worked for New Japan Pro-Wrestling (NJPW) where he served as an English language commentator on NJPW World. In 2020, through Impact's relationship with AEW, Callis began appearing on AEW programming. The following year in 2021, Callis' time as Impact executive vice president came to an end, with Callis remaining in the company as an on-air talent until October 2021 when the AEW and Impact partnership ended, after which he fully transitioned to AEW.

== Professional wrestling career ==
=== West Four Wrestling Alliance/International Wrestling Alliance (1989–1998) ===
Callis was trained by Manitoba wrestling promoter Tony Condello, debuting in 1989 in Condello's West Four Wrestling Alliance (WFWA) promotion under his birth name. Later that year, Callis adopted the ring name "The Natural". In May 1991, The Natural won the WFWA Canadian Heavyweight Championship. Between 1991 and 1994, he held the championship a total of four times. In 1994, the West Four Wrestling Alliance was renamed the International Wrestling Alliance (IWA). Callis held the IWA Heavyweight Championship twice in 1996.

In 1992, Callis wrestled for the Quebec-based Lutte Lanaudière as "The General", teaming with El Diablero as "The Jet Set Team". The Jet Set Team held the Lutte Lanaudière Tag Team Championship for eight months.

=== World Wrestling Federation (1996–1998) ===
==== The Truth Commission (1996–1998) ====
Callis received a try-out match with the World Wrestling Federation (WWF) in 1996 and was eventually hired to form a tag team with Rick Martel, which was dubbed "The Models". When Martel officially departed from the WWF for World Championship Wrestling (WCW), Callis was left without a gimmick and spot on WWF television. In a shoot interview with RF Video, Callis first revealed that he and Rick Martel were set to debut on WWF TV as "The Supermodels" in 1997, before he turned on Martel, turning Martel into a babyface for the first time since Martel walked out on his former teammate Tito Santana at WrestleMania V.

On September 20, 1997, Callis debuted in the WWF as "The Jackyl", a member (and eventually leader) of a group of wrestlers known as "The Truth Commission" (a take on the South African Truth and Reconciliation Commission) replacing the Commandant for refusing to take bumps. An article in WWF Magazine claimed that he was a lower-level WWF employee during the early 1990s, and that he developed a messianic complex when he led a group of WWF wrestlers out of Kuwait when they were stranded there during the Gulf War. In an effort to play up The Jackyl's gimmick as a charismatic, power-hungry fanatic, commentator Jim Ross often referred to him as the "David Koresh of the World Wrestling Federation". The Jackyl, though mainly a manager, would sometimes compete in singles matches mainly on Shotgun Saturday Night and at house shows against Salvatore Sincere, Brakkus and Scott Taylor. Notably, The Jackyl fought in his hometown, Winnipeg, as "The General", against Jim Neidhart in a losing effort. Jackyl would frequently participate in tag team matches with The Interrogator (later known as Kurrgan). The Truth Commission stable was not particularly successful, with their biggest achievement being a victory over the Disciples of Apocalypse at Survivor Series 1997. At WrestleMania XIV, The Jackyl ordered Kurrgan to eliminate stablemates Recon and Sniper from the Tag Team Battle Royal, effectively disbanding the stable.

==== The Oddities; The Acolytes (1998) ====
Callis returned to television in 1998, forming a stable known as "The Parade of Human Oddities" (later known as simply "The Oddities"). The group consisted of "freakish" wrestlers, including Golga (a masked Earthquake) and Kurrgan, among others. The group had entrance music performed by the Insane Clown Posse.

The Oddities did not last long, and Callis eventually started managing the new tag team of Faarooq and Bradshaw, "The Acolytes", until he was released by the WWF. Callis claims he was released by Bruce Prichard for "getting himself over at the expense of the talent". Shortly after being released, Callis began writing weekly wrestling columns for the Sun Media Group and co-hosted a local Winnipeg radio show called "No Holds Barred" with Joe Aiello on CITI-FM.

=== Extreme Championship Wrestling (1999–2001) ===
In mid-1999, Callis debuted in Extreme Championship Wrestling (ECW) as "Cyrus the Virus" (a name lifted from the 1997 movie Con Air), a commentator with a gimmick similar to that of his WWF persona. He would broadcast exclusively on pay-per-view along with Joey Styles. As the real-life issues between ECW and their network TNN heightened, Callis was then presented as working for the network, under the shortened moniker of "Cyrus". His character represented many of the real problems between ECW and TNN at that point, as he constantly criticized the violent nature of ECW programming. He would also display affection for RollerJam and Rockin' Bowl, two programs on the network that ECW fans alike despised, due to the network giving them preferential treatment despite poor ratings in comparison with ECW. He singled out Joel Gertner for disciplinary measures, among other things due to Gertner "getting himself over at the expense of the talent", which was the reason given to Callis by Bruce Prichard for his WWF release.

Cyrus then displayed authority in ECW due to his executive position with the network, working as a heel to crusade against ECW fan favorites (in kayfabe), but to also appease the network by preventing the lewd content (as a shoot). Cyrus then teamed with the anti-hardcore Steve Corino, and eventually formed a stable with Corino, his manager Jack Victory, and their hired guns Yoshihiro Tajiri and Rhino. They were collectively known as The Network. He engaged in a long-term feud with commentator Joel Gertner, which culminated in a match on October 1, 2000, at Anarchy Rulz 2000, in which Gertner was triumphant.

Following this, Cyrus (kayfabe) canceled ECW on TNN (as the show was soon to be canceled legitimately, in favor of WWF Raw). Cyrus would then go on to aid Rhino in winning his first ECW World Heavyweight Championship at the final pay-per-view, Guilty as Charged 2001. ECW would declare bankruptcy soon after.

=== Independent circuit (2001–2003, 2018) ===
With ECW out of business and WCW, which had expressed interest in signing Callis, purchased by the WWF, Callis returned to university, eventually earning a Master of Business Administration (MBA).

Following ECW's closing, Callis wrestled on the independent circuit, primarily appearing for Canadian promotions such as the Prairie Wrestling Association, Pro Outlaw Wrestling, and Top Rope Championship Wrestling. From 2001 to 2002, he appeared with Border City Wrestling, holding the BCW Can-Am Tag Team Championship with Terry Taylor. Callis also briefly operated the No Holds Barred Wrestling Camp, a Winnipeg-based wrestling training camp.

On July 13, 2018, it was announced Callis would serve as part of the broadcast team for the September 1 All In event, alongside Ian Riccaboni, Sean Mooney, Excalibur, Alicia Atout, Justin Roberts, and Bobby Cruise.

=== Total Nonstop Action Wrestling (2003–2004) ===
In 2003, Callis debuted in Total Nonstop Action Wrestling (TNA) as a "Management Consultant". During this time, he claimed credit for the creation of the Ultimate X match, which he said he devised to settle a dispute over who the rightful X Division champion was.

In storyline, Callis engaged in a power struggle with then Director of Authority Erik Watts and used his power to make life difficult for Jerry Lynn, repeatedly fining and suspending him. On January 28, 2004, Callis succeeded in ousting Watts from TNA when he defeated him in a match for control of the promotion, though he quietly departed TNA soon afterward.

=== Retirement (2004–2017) ===
Callis departed from TNA on good terms in 2004, having been offered a job in international trade that made use of his MBA. While having generally retired from professional wrestling, Callis made an appearance at the ECW reunion show Hardcore Homecoming on June 10, 2005.

Following his departure from TNA, Callis began writing weekly wrestling columns for the Sun Media Group and co-hosted a local Winnipeg radio show called No Holds Barred with Joe Aiello on 92 CITI FM. On October 18, 2016, Callis debuted a new podcast with longtime friend Lance Storm called Killing the Town with Storm and Cyrus.

=== New Japan Pro-Wrestling (2017–2019) ===
On January 17, 2017, Callis announced that he had accepted an offer to become the new English color commentator for New Japan Pro-Wrestling (NJPW) events on the NJPW World streaming service, working alongside Kevin Kelly. Callis replaced Steve Corino who had signed with WWE. At the December 11 World Tag League 2017 Final, Callis was attacked by Chris Jericho in an angle that promoted Jericho's match with Kenny Omega at Wrestle Kingdom 12 – a match Callis helped NJPW to book.

Callis stopped commentating for NJPW after Dominion 2019.

=== Return to Impact (2017–2021) ===
On December 5, 2017, Impact Wrestling announced Callis as the promotion's new co-executive vice president, alongside Scott D'Amore.

On April 22, 2018, Callis served as the color commentator for the Redemption pay-per-view event as well as on the following episode of Impact!. During the Summer and Fall of 2018, Callis began appearing regularly alongside Josh Mathews on commentary for Impact events, eventually becoming the permanent color commentator for the promotion. Callis was later replaced on commentary by Madison Rayne, though he would remain Impact's co-executive vice president.

In May 2021, it was reported that Callis' time as Impact executive vice president has ended, though he would remain as an on-air talent. On the June 17 episode of Impact!, Callis' role as executive vice president was terminated by Tommy Dreamer.

=== All Elite Wrestling (2020–present) ===
==== Managing Kenny Omega (2020–2023) ====
Callis made his All Elite Wrestling (AEW) debut as a special guest commentator, at the request of Kenny Omega, during the World Title Eliminator Tournament Final between Omega and "Hangman" Adam Page at Full Gear.

On December 2, 2020, at Winter Is Coming, Callis was a special guest commentator for the AEW World Championship match between the champion Jon Moxley and the challenger Omega. During the match, Callis helped Omega win the title. When asked about his interference, he assured everyone that their questions would get answered on the December 8 episode of Impact!. On December 9, Callis returned to Dynamite, arriving by helicopter with Omega. Callis then revealed he had been planning Omega's championship victory since both men first met in their native country of Canada decades ago.

On the March 29, 2023 edition of Dynamite, Callis was featured in a backstage interview alongside Kenny Omega and the Young Bucks which was interrupted by an attack from the Blackpool Combat Club. During the segment Jon Moxley struck Callis, who fell into a lighting rig and Callis' head caught the edge of the Barn Door portion of the rig. This legitimately caused a large wound on Callis' head which later left him with a prominent scar.

==== Don Callis Family (2023–present) ====
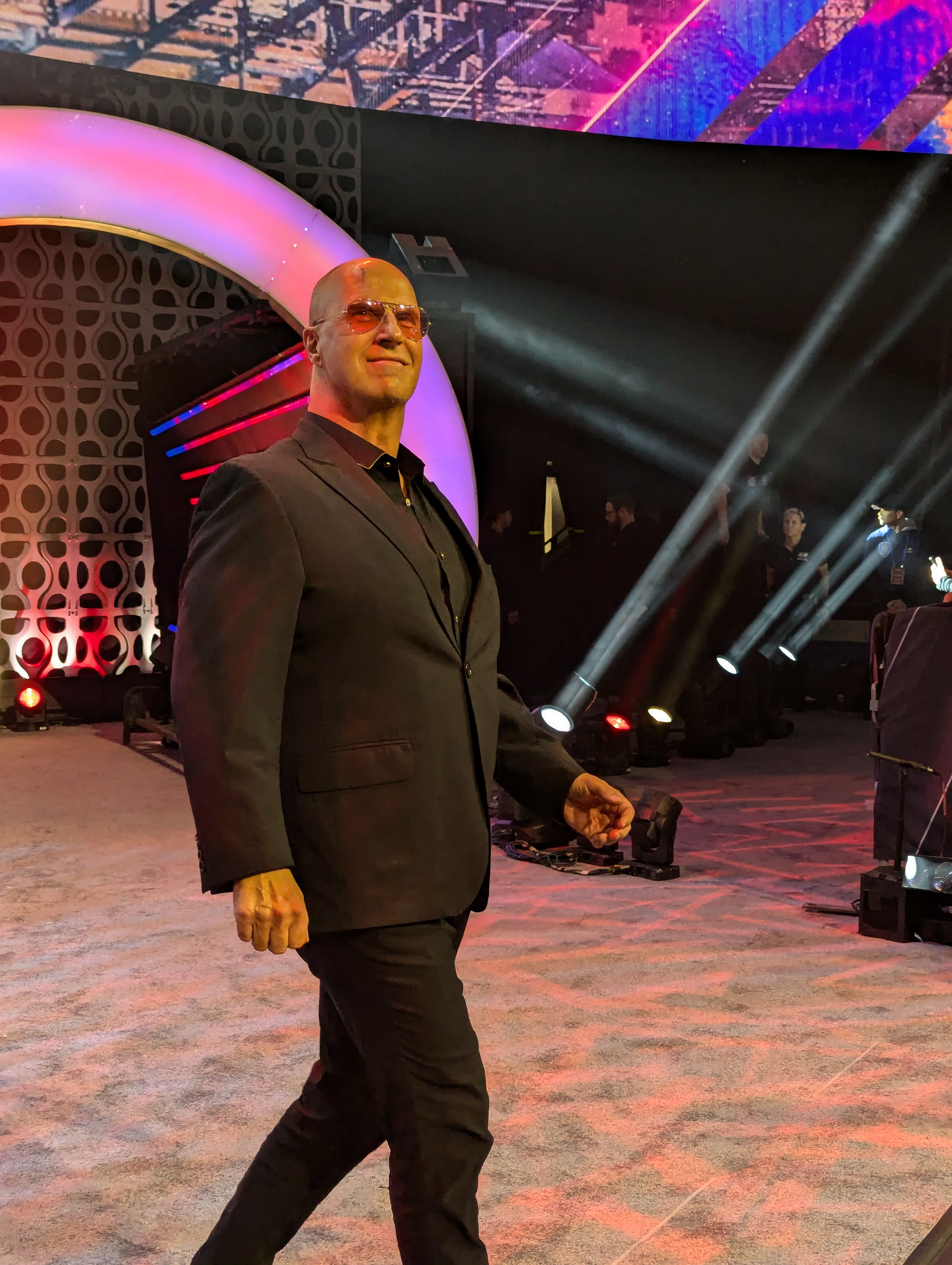
Callis at Grand Slam in September 2024

In mid-2023, Callis turned on Omega, and aligned himself with Konosuke Takeshita and Will Ospreay to form the Don Callis Family. During a post-show press conference at Triplemanía XXXI Tijuana, Callis was legitimately assaulted by a fan who mistook a storyline attack on Kenny Omega to be real. Callis suffered multiple injuries and was immediately went to San Diego to seek medical attention. In the following months, Callis would add Sammy Guevara, Powerhouse Hobbs, and Kyle Fletcher to his family. On December 28 at Dynamite: New Years Smash, Guevara left the Don Callis Family and reunited with Chris Jericho. In the summer of 2024, Trent Beretta and Rush joined the Don Callis Family, while Ospreay left. Later in the year, Lance Archer and Brian Cage joined, while Rush and Hobbs left. In 2025, Mark Davis, Josh Alexander, Rocky Romero, Hechicero, Kazuchika Okada, Wardlow, Andrade El Idolo and El Clon joined the Don Callis Family. However in November, Andrade was quietly removed as a member after a legitimate contract dispute with his previous company WWE. He would re-join a few months later. In 2026, Jake Doyle, Volador Jr., and Kevin Knight would join the stabe, while Andrade and Takeshita both left the stable.

=== Maple Leaf Pro Wrestling (2024–present) ===
On September 4, 2024, it was announced that Callis would join the commentary team of the revived Maple Leaf Pro Wrestling (MLP) alongside Mauro Ranallo.

== In other media ==
In 1998, Jakks Pacific released an action figure of Callis's WWF persona The Jackyl as part of the WWF 2 Tuff Series 2 line. The figure was packaged in a two-pack with Kurrgan.

== Championships and accomplishments ==
- Amateur Wrestling Association
  - AWA Tag Team Championship (1 time) - with El Diablero
- Border City Wrestling
  - BCW Can-Am Tag Team Championship (1 time) – with Terry Taylor
- Lutte Lanaudière
  - Lutte Lanaudière Tag Team Championship (1 time) – with El Diablero
- Pro Wrestling Illustrated
  - Faction of the Year (2025) as part of the Don Callis Family
  - Ranked No. 345 of the top 500 singles wrestlers in the PWI 500 in 2002
- West Four Wrestling Alliance/International Wrestling Alliance
  - IWA Heavyweight Championship (2 times)
  - WFWA Canadian Heavyweight Championship (5 times)
- Wrestling Observer Newsletter
  - Best Non-Wrestler (2023, 2025)
