= Tony Condello =

Italian-Canadian wrestler and promoter (born 1942)

Personal information
- Born: August 8, 1942 (age 84) Calabria, Italy
- Children: 2

Professional wrestling career
- Ring name(s): Tony Condello; Tony Savoldi; Tony Torpedo
- Billed height: 5 ft 6 in (1.68 m)
- Billed weight: 200 lb (91 kg)
- Trained by: Alf Wuhr
- Debut: 1958
- Retired: 2011

Tony Condello (born August 8, 1942) is an Italian-Canadian retired professional wrestler and promoter most known for founding International Wrestling Alliance in Manitoba, Canada.

== Professional wrestling career ==
=== Early career ===
Tony Condello began his career in professional wrestling in 1958. He wrestled throughout Manitoba for several years, winning tag team titles on multiple occasions as one half the duo known as "The Flying Italians" with his partner Guy Vinci.

After the local wrestling club was purchased by the American Wrestling Association, Condello turned to promoting in order to pave the way for Canadian wrestlers to have a home.

=== Life as a promoter ===
While booking events throughout Manitoba, Condello worked alongside many future stars, such as Edge, Christian, Ron Ritchie, Kerry Brown, & Buddy Lane.

Condello's greatest success came in 1986, when he struck a deal with Eddie Sharkey's Pro Wrestling America promotion, which would include a talent exchange and dual promotion. Several stars that were included in this exchange were Ricky Rice, Derrick Dukes, The Terminators, Chris Markoff, and Buck Zumhofe, as well as stars such as "Bulldog" Bob Brown and Bruiser Brody.

=== "Death Tour" ===
For over 30 years, Tony Condello had promoted an annual "Death Tour" of Inuit communities in northern Manitoba.

The tour is well known for its rough conditions. Wrestlers are required to pack at least one bag of food to last them the entire tour. There are also no hotel accommodations with wrestlers having to either sleep in cars on the side of the road or at venues they perform.

== Personal life ==
Condello has two daughters. Liana is a gerontologist and Sarina is the creator of a reality show on the Bravo network called Way Off Broadway. Condello himself helped coordinate fight scenes for the performances seen on the show.

== Championships and accomplishments ==
- West Four Wrestling Alliance
  - WFWA Canadian Heavyweight Championship (4 times)
  - WFWA Canadian Tag Team Championship (3 times) - with Dave Gobeil
