= Mike George (wrestler) =

American professional wrestler

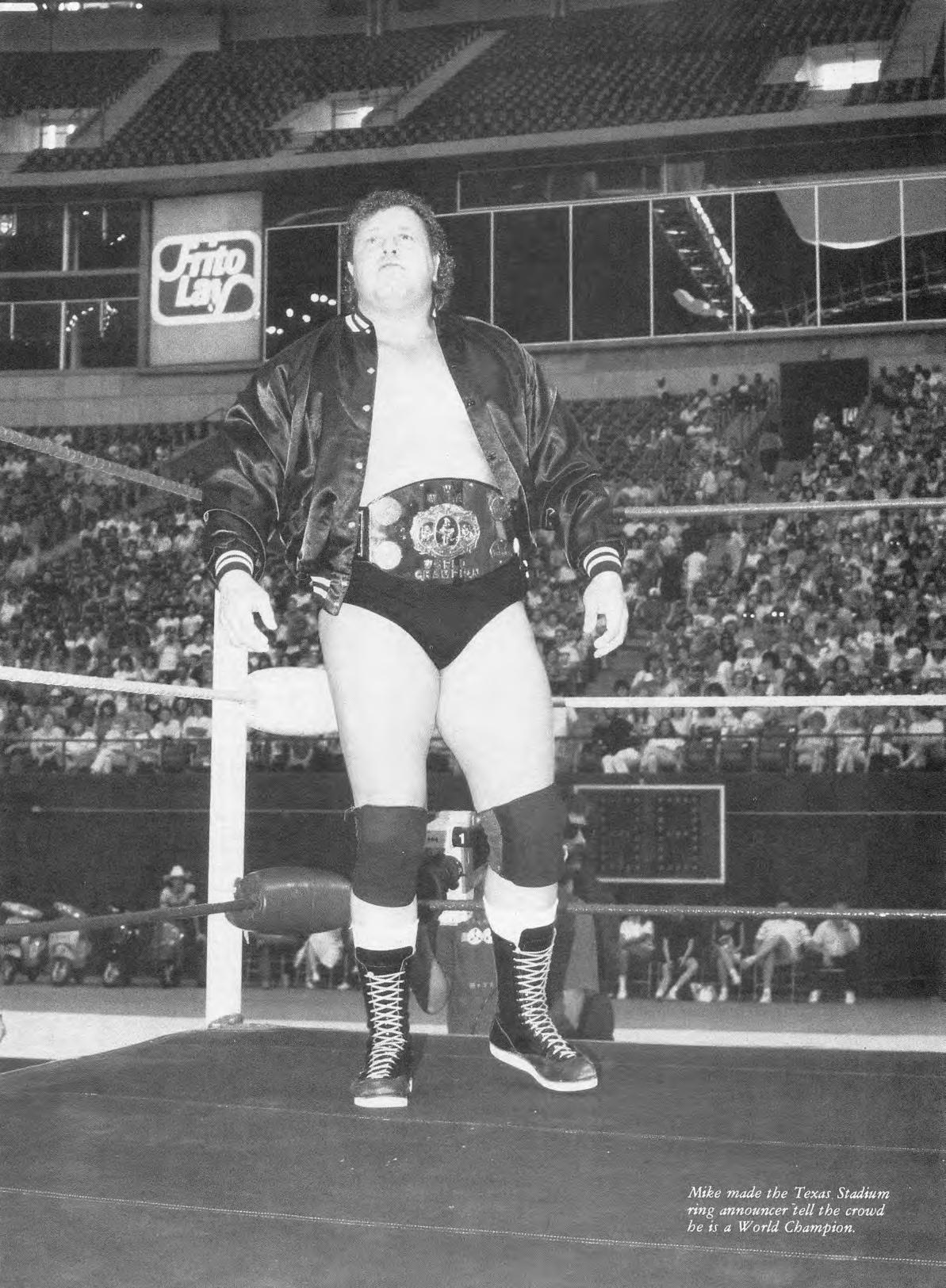

Personal information
- Born: Michael George; November 30, 1949 (age 76) St. Joseph, Missouri, US

Professional wrestling career
- Ring name: Mike George
- Billed height: 6 ft 1 in (185 cm)
- Billed weight: 275 lb (125 kg)
- Billed from: St. Joseph, Missouri, US
- Trained by: Harley Race
- Debut: 1969
- Retired: 1991

Michael George (born November 30, 1949) is an American retired professional wrestler, best known by his ring name "Timekeeper" Mike George. George is best known for working in the National Wrestling Alliance in the 1970s and 1980s to the early 1990s.

== Professional wrestling career ==
George made his wrestling debut in 1969. In September 1972 in National Wrestling Alliance member Championship Wrestling from Florida, he lost to Mike Webster. In 1973, he wrestled for NWA member Central States Wrestling, where he won his first major championship when he and Jim Brunzell won the Central States version of the NWA World Tag Team Championship by defeating Roger Kirby and Lord Alfred Hayes on October 25 in Kansas City, Kansas.

George won his first NWA Central States Heavyweight Championship by defeating "Bulldog" Bob Brown on March 21, 1974, in Kansas City, then won the title four more times during 1976. George later competed for Bill Watts' Mid-South Wrestling Association, where he held several Mid-South championships, including the Mid-South Tag Team Championship with Junkyard Dog, defeating the team of the Wild Samoans on October 15, 1981, in Jackson, Mississippi.

In 1980, George made a few appearances for the St. Louis Wrestling Club, which was headed by Sam Muchnick. During that year, he won his sixth NWA Central States Heavyweight title by defeating Bob Brown in Kansas City on September 11, then he teamed with Bob Sweetan to win his first NWA Central States Tag Team Championship by beating Bob Brown and Rufus R. Jones on October 30 in Kansas City. In 1983, George competed for New Japan Pro-Wrestling. During this period, George teamed with Rusher Kimura. In late 1983, George competed for Mid-Atlantic Championship Wrestling.

In 1985 with Central States Wrestling, George teamed with Dusty Wolfe in a loss to the American Starship (American Starship Coyote and American Starship Eagle) on July 3 in Kansas City, Kansas. On August 8 in Kansas City, Missouri, George along with Art Crews and Rufus R. Jones defeated Edgar Thomas, Ricky Starr and Roger Kirby in a six-man elimination tag team match. George later wrestled for All Japan Pro Wrestling. Upon returning to the Central States territory, George won his first NWA Central States Television Championship by defeating Akio Sato on May 23, 1986, in St. Joseph, Missouri.

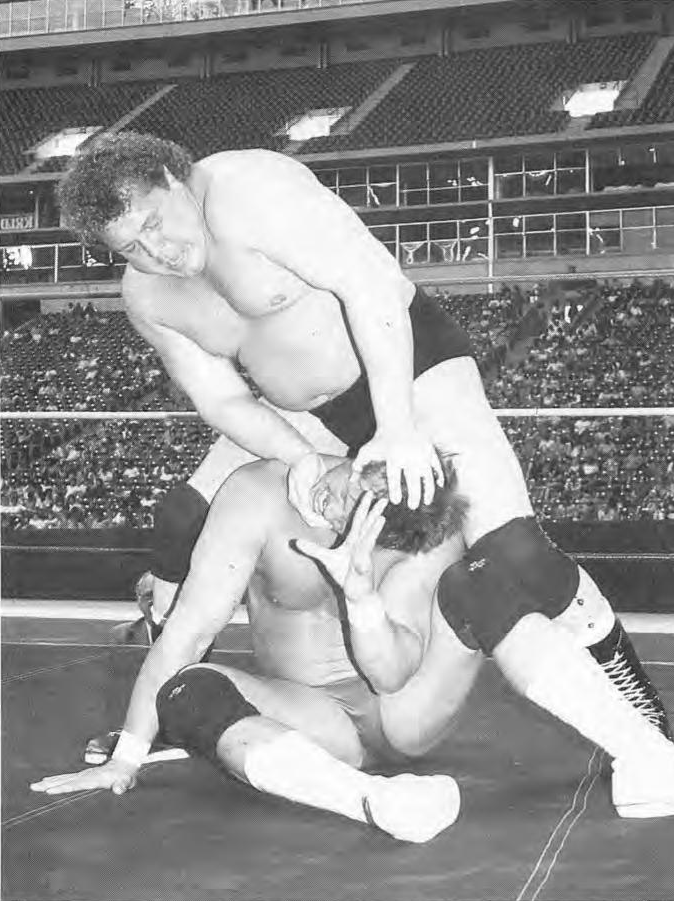
George (top) wrenches Jeff Raitz's (bottom) neck, circa 1988

In 1988, George returned to the Central States area, which had withdrawn from the NWA and transformed itself into the World Wrestling Alliance. On January 23 that year, he defeated Dick Slater in a tournament final in Kansas City to determine the first WWA World Heavyweight Champion. He lost the title to Masa Chono on February 26 in St. Joseph, but regained in on March 17 in Kansas City. On May 8, 1988, at the Von Erich Memorial Parade of Champions in Irving, Texas, he retained his WWA title by defeating Jeff Raitz, then continued to hold the title until the WWA closed later in 1988. In 1989, George wrestled for the American Wrestling Association.

George continued wrestling on the independent circuit until 1991, also making occasional appearances in World Championship Wrestling as a jobber.

== Retirement ==
After retirement in 1991, Mike George went to work at The Woodlands, a horse and dog racing track based in Kansas City, KS, doing security. After The Woodlands closed down, he went on to work at 7th Street Casino as a professional security officer/dispatcher.

== Championships and accomplishments ==
- Central States Wrestling / World Wrestling Alliance
  - NWA Central States Heavyweight Championship (4 times)
  - NWA World Tag Team Championship (Central States version) (5 times) with Jim Brunzell (2), Jerry Oates (1), Scott Casey (1) and Super Intern (1),
  - NWA Central States Tag Team Championship (4 times) with Bob Sweetan (1), Mark Romero (2) and Rufus R. Jones (1)
  - NWA Central States Television Championship (2 times)
  - WWA World Heavyweight Championship (2 times, first, last)
- Mid-South Wrestling / Universal Wrestling Federation / NWA Tri-State Wrestling
  - Mid-South Louisiana Heavyweight Championship (1 time)
  - Mid-South Mississippi Heavyweight Championship (2 times)
  - Mid-South North American Heavyweight Championship (3 times)
  - Mid-South Tag Team Championship (2 times) with Bob Sweetan (1) and Junkyard Dog (1)
  - NWA Tri-State Heavyweight Championship (2 times)
  - NWA Tri-State Tag Team Championship (1 time) with Ed Wiskoski (1)
  - NWA United States Tag Team Championship (Tri-State Version) (2 times) with Porkchop Cash (1) and Randy Tyler (1)
- Other titles:
  - Fort Myers Heavyweight Championship ( 1 time )
- Pro Wrestling Illustrated
  - PWI ranked him #283 of the top 500 singles wrestlers in the PWI 500 in 1991
