= Art Crews =

American retired professional wrestler

Personal information
- Born: January 3, 1959 (age 67) Topeka, Kansas

Professional wrestling career
- Ring name: Art Crews
- Billed height: 6 ft 1 in (1.85 m)
- Billed weight: 240 Ib (109 kg)
- Billed from: Topeka, Kansas
- Trained by: Pat O'Connor; Ronnie Etchison
- Debut: 1980
- Retired: 1988

Art Crews (born January 3, 1959) is an American retired professional wrestler who competed in North American regional promotions including the National Wrestling Alliance, particularly the Central States, Mid-South and Pacific Northwest territories, during the 1980s.

In Shawn Michaels' autobiography Heartbreak & Triumph, Michaels explains that Art Crews was the first person he wrestled in his career, making him the first person to ever defeat Michaels.

== Career ==
=== Early life and career ===
Born in Topeka, Kansas, and grew up in Meriden, Kansas, Crews was a fan of professional wrestling as a child, often attending wrestling events in Saint Joseph, Missouri, with his mother, Billie Crews. Trained by Pat O'Connor and Ronnie Etchison, Crews made his debut in 1980 fighting Billy Howard to a time limit draw at the Kansas City Memorial Hall in Kansas City, Kansas.

After spending almost two years in the Southeast, he began competing for Pacific Northwest Wrestling, defeating Chris Colt at the Sports Arena in Portland, Oregon, on September 5, 1981, and was later named the PNW "Rookie of the Year" by the end of the year. He appeared in Maple Leaf Wrestling, teaming with Kenny Jay against Jerry and Johnny Valiant at the Oshawa Civic Auditorium in Oshawa, Ontario, pinning Johnny Valiant on October 1, 1981, due in part to outside interference from the Rougeau Brothers.

Feuding with Dizzy Hogan in January 1982, he also lost several matches against Matt Borne, "Playboy" Buddy Rose, Billy White Wolf and fought to a draw against Stan Stasiak later that month.

Losing to Gene Kiniski on February 3, he later defeated Tiger Chung Lee and Terry Fargo. Hogan, however, dominated their feud during mid-February but finally lost to him on February 27, 1982.

=== Mid-South Wrestling and Central States ===
Moving on to the St. Louis area, Crews teamed with "Bulldog" Bob Brown to defeat Gene Lewis and Ron MacFarlane at the Kiel Auditorium in St. Louis, Missouri, on April 16, 1982. Facing Dewey Robertson in a series of matches during the year, he also faced Baron von Raschke, "Nature Boy" Ric Flair, Terry Funk and Kerry von Erich in televised matches on the NWA's "Wrestling at the Chase" television program. WRESTLING AT THE CHASE, was St. Louis' TV program.

Facing "Dr. Death" Steve Williams and Kamala in January 1983, he also teamed with Tim Horner against Marty Lunde and Tom Renesto and with Mr. Wrestling II against Tug Taylor and Joe Stark. The following month, he faced "Iron" Mike Sharpe and "Hacksaw" Jim Duggan in several singles matches, as well as teaming with Tim Horner against Kelly Kiniski. Feuding with Kamala & The Black Ninja and later Mr. Olympia, Crews also appeared on the Superdome Extravaganza supercards defeating Kelly Kiniski on April 16 and later lost to George Weingroff on July 16.

Although losing to Steve Williams on August 12, he defeated Doug Vines and Tim Horner later that month. After losses to George Weingroff, Jim Neidhart and Nikolai Volkoff, he teamed with Donna Day in a mixed tag team match against Debbie Combs and "Wildfire" Tommy Rich on September 22.

He also teamed with Mike Bond against The Missing Link and King Kong Bundy and later with Tom Stanton against George Weingroff and King Cobra during October. He later teamed with Doug Vines losing to Jerry and Marty Oates on November 4 and, with US Steel, losing to The A-Team on November 21.

Teaming with Robert Gibson, Bobby Eaton, Stagger Lee and Giant Frazier in a 10-man tag team match, Crews lost to The A-Team, The Moondogs and Dennis Condrey on November 28. However, teaming with Robert Gibson, Bobby Eaton, Stagger Lee, Terry Taylor and Tom Pritchard, Crews was able to defeat The A-Team, The Moondogs, Dream Machine and Porkchop Cash on December 5 and, with Ricky Morton, Bobby Eaton and The Jaguar, defeated The Moondogs, Angelo Poffo and Franklin Hayes on December 19, 1983.

In early 1984, Crews teamed with The Jaguar losing to Norvell Austin and Sabu on January 1. A week later, he fought to a draw against Terry Gibbs and lost to King Konga on January 24. He also teamed with Dutch Mantel against Angelo Poffo and Randy Savage losing to them by disqualification on January 31.

The following month, he lost to Rick Rude and, with Tommy Gilbert, to The A-Team before defeating The Black Ninja on February 28. He also participated in the Mid-South Wrestling Southern Tag Team Championship Tournament with Tom Jones being eliminated by Tommy Rich and Eddie Gilbert in the opening rounds in Memphis, Tennessee, on March 26. After losses to Ox Baker and Jim Neidhart in early April, he left the area.

While in NWA Central States, Crews won the then vacant Central States TV title in a championship tournament defeating Scott Ferris in the first round, Marty Jannetty in the semi-finals and "Crazy" Luke Graham in the finals on May 24, 1984.

Returning to the Mid-South area to face Terry Taylor on August 16, he also teamed with Randy Barber against The Fantastics on August 23 and with Rick McCord against The Road Warriors August 30 before facing Magnum T. A. on September 21. In one of his last televised appearances with the promotion, Crews teamed with Lee Ramsey against Chavo & Hector Guerrero on November 16, 1984.

Although the title became vacant several weeks later, Crew regained the title on August 21 and feuded with the Man Eating Beast over the title before losing it to Gypsy Joe on September 2. Managed by Slick, Crews teamed with "Diamond" Timothy Flowers as Arthur W. Crews facing Rufus R. Jones and Butch Reed and The Midnight Rockers in several matches before Slick left for the World Wrestling Federation.

While touring South Africa with Flowers during 1985, the two nearly incited a riot in front of an estimated 20,000 crowd in Johannesburg after defeating two local South African wrestlers when both Crews and Flowers tore apart the South African flag carried by their opponents. Having to be escorted by police officers, Crews was stabbed in the lower back by an unknown fan while making their way to the dressing room. The wound was not serious however and Crews continued to wrestling on the tour.

After splitting up with Flowers, he defeated T.G. Stone, Dusty Wolfe in early 1985 and fought to a time limit draw with Roger Kirby on February 7. Winning a 6-man battle royal on February 14, he later defeated Roger Kirby in a rematch and teamed with Mike George against Super Destroyer and Mr. Pogo on March 14.

Later that year, Crews defeated Gary Royal for the NWA Central States Television title on November 18, 1985, successfully defending the title until leaving the promotion in January 1986.

=== Later career ===
Returning to the Portland-area during the next two years, he later defeated Brett Sawyer at the Tulsa Convention Center in Tulsa, Oklahoma, on August 17 and later made an appearance on the UWF's Superdome Extravaganza supercard with a loss to Jeff Gaylord in New Orleans, Louisiana, on November 27, 1986.

The following year, he toured with All Japan Pro Wrestling teaming with El Olympico against Jumbo Tsuruta and Genichiro Tenryu on February 20 and Hiroshi Wajima on February 24 before teaming with Terry "Bam Bam" Gordy against Jumbo Tsuruta and Genichiro Tenryu on March 7, 1987.

=== Law enforcement career ===
In late 1987, Crews began cutting back his wrestling schedule in favor of pursuing a career in law enforcement and corrections and eventually retired in 1989. Attending trade school in Portland, Oregon, he was hired as a correctional officer by the Oregon State Corrections Department to teach self defense techniques and compliance holds to other officers.

Graduating from La Salle University with a degree in Criminal Justice Management, he briefly worked for at a private correctional facility in Louisiana and, during his 13 year career, eventually worked his way up from an instructor and correctional officer to managerial positions as a prison administrator and executive manager. In 2001, he became Chief of Security at the Yakima Department of Corrections in Yakima, Washington, where he supervised 184 employees. He then became the warden of Coastal Bend Detention Center in Texas and manages nearly 500 employees and 2500 inmates until his resignation in August 2009.

January 4, 2010, Crews started a new position as Jail Administrator/Captain with the Chippewa County Sheriff's Department in Chippewa Falls, Wisconsin.

== Championships and accomplishments ==
- Cauliflower Alley Club
  - Men’s Wrestling Award (2009)
- Central States Wrestling
  - NWA Central States Tag Team Championship (1 time) - with Timothy Flowers (disputed)
  - NWA Central States Television Championship (2 times)

== Media ==
- Best of UWF Mid-South (1985-1986). Perf. Art Crews. DVD. RF Video, 2006.
- Classic St. Louis Wrestling. Perf. Art Crews. DVD. RF Video, 2005.
- Wrestling's Greatest Matches, Vol. 21. Perf. Art Crews. VHS. Coliseum Video, 1994.
