= Hercules (wrestler) =

American professional wrestler (1956–2004)

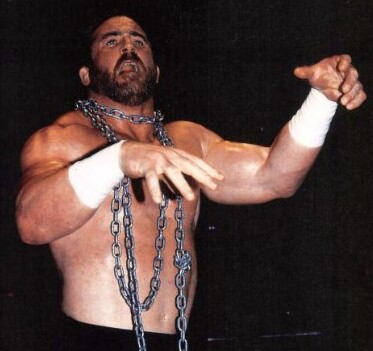
- Hercules, c. 1988

Personal information
- Born: Raymond Constantine Fernandez Jr. May 7, 1956 New York City, U.S.
- Died: March 6, 2004 (aged 47) Tampa, Florida, U.S.
- Cause of death: Heart disease
- Spouse: Debbie Fernandez (m. 1976)
- Children: 7

Professional wrestling career
- Ring name(s): Hercules; Hercules Hernandez; Masked Assassin #2; The Mighty Hercules; Mr. Wrestling III; Super Invader
- Billed height: 6 ft 1 in (185 cm)
- Billed weight: 275 lb (125 kg)
- Billed from: Bangkok, Thailand (as Super Invader); Tampa, Florida (as Hercules)
- Trained by: Hiro Matsuda
- Debut: 1979
- Retired: 1999

Raymond Constantine Fernandez Jr. (May 7, 1956 – March 6, 2004) was an American professional wrestler better known by his ring name Hercules Hernandez, or simply Hercules. Fernandez began his career in 1979, primarily wrestling in Florida and Texas before earning his greatest success by joining the World Wrestling Federation in 1985, where he was a member of The Heenan Family. He later split from the stable and feuded with Heenan and Ted DiBiase, afterwards turning heel in 1990, forming Power and Glory with Paul Roma, where they had a feud with The Rockers. Fernandez was also a featured bodybuilder, appearing in several muscle magazines. He is also known for his appearances in World Championship Wrestling, Jim Crockett Promotions, and New-Japan Pro Wrestling.

== Early life ==
Fernandez was born in New York City on May 7, 1956. After his mother died from cancer when he was aged six, his father relocated the family to Tampa, Florida. Fernandez attended A. P. Leto High School, where he competed in amateur wrestling. He graduated from high school in 1974 and enlisted in the United States Air Force for three years.

== Professional wrestling career ==
=== Early career (1979–1983) ===
Fernandez was trained to wrestle by Hiro Matsuda. He started wrestling in 1979, mainly performing in Florida and Texas territories as "Hercules" Hernandez. In 1982, he joined the NWA Central States territory (which ran out of Kansas City and promoted shows in Kansas, Missouri, and Iowa). While in the Central States, Hercules teamed up with Dewey Robertson, and the two won the Central States tag team championship on two occasions; they beat Mike George and Mark Romero both times. He also held the Central States Television title for a little over six months, winning it from, and losing it back to, his main rival, Romero.

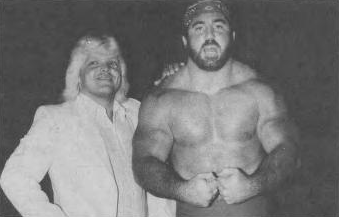
Fernandez (right) and his manager Gary Royal (left), c. 1983

Fernandez's two other notable feuds in the Central States territory were with Manny Fernandez and Harley Race. His feud with Race garnered Hernandez significant attention in the national wrestling scene, due to Race's stature as a former NWA World Champion. This feud began because Race had an issue with Oliver Humperdink's House of Humperdink stable, which Hernandez had become a part of soon after joining the promotion. One match between the two had the stipulation that if Race won, he would get five minutes inside a steel cage with Humperdink. Hercules was caught using brass knuckles and disqualified, which meant that the cage match was on. When the match was about to start, Hernandez ran to ringside, knocked Race out and threw him into the ring with Humperdink. In the end, Race recovered and delivered a piledriver to Humperdink onto a steel chair injuring (kayfabe) Humperdink and causing him to leave the territory. After losing his manager, Hernandez did not stay in the Central States territory for long but instead signed up with Jim Crockett Promotions (JCP).

=== All Japan Pro Wrestling (1983) ===
In January 1983, Fernandez toured Japan with All Japan Pro Wrestling.

=== Jim Crockett Promotions (1983–1984) ===
In JCP, Fernandez was paired up with Jody Hamilton, who had been wrestling as the Masked Assassin; Fernandez became the Masked Assassin 2, a gimmick that had been played by several other wrestlers over the years. The two competed at the first ever Starrcade beating the team of Rufus R. Jones and Bugsy McGraw. Fernandez's run as one of the Assassins ended less than a year later, after he was unmasked by Jimmy Valiant.

=== Mid-South Wrestling (1984–1985) ===
After being unmasked, Fernandez moved on to Bill Watts' Mid-South promotion, where he once again donned a mask. Mr. Wrestling II had recently turned on his tag team partner Magnum T. A. and become a heel. Mr. Wrestling II renamed himself simply "Mr. Wrestling" and got a new protégé, "Mr. Wrestling II", who was Fernandez under a mask (referred to as "Mr. Wrestling III" in magazines to avoid confusing their readers). Mr. Wrestling II seconded Mr. Wrestling in his feud with Magnum T. A. Later on, Fernandez unmasked and competed once again as "Hercules Hernandez", and feuded with "Hacksaw" Jim Duggan under the tutelage of Jim Cornette. Hercules soon joined Skandor Akbar's stable, Devastation Inc., alongside future WWF co-worker Ted DiBiase. As part of Devastation Inc., Hercules feuded with the Junkyard Dog and Terry Taylor, before leaving for Florida.

=== Championship Wrestling from Florida (1985) ===
In "Championship Wrestling from Florida", Hercules quickly won the NWA Florida Southern Heavyweight Championship from Brian Blair, and then won the NWA Florida Heavyweight Championship from Hector Guerrero the following month; this made him a double champion. Some time during July 1985, Fernandez was fired from CWF after a dressing room fight with Wahoo McDaniel and stripped of both titles. After leaving Florida, Fernandez went to World Wrestling Council (WWC), in Puerto Rico before signing with the World Wrestling Federation. Hernandez had a brief stint in Dallas with NWA World Class Championship Wrestling where was managed by Sunshine and had several high-profile feuds, most notably again Gino Hernandez.

=== World Wrestling Federation (1985–1992) ===
==== Early appearances (1985–1986) ====
Fernandez debuted in the WWF in November 1985, managed by "Classy" Freddie Blassie. His first major national exposure came when he competed at WrestleMania 2 in a losing effort against Ricky "The Dragon" Steamboat at the Sports Arena in the Los Angeles part of the show. Blassie soon retired, as, in storyline, he sold his stable to Slick and Fernandez soon found himself floundering in the WWF midcard.

==== Heenan Family (1986–1988) ====
In late-1986, Hercules' contract was "sold" by Slick to fellow heel manager Bobby "The Brain" Heenan. Soon after, he dropped "Hernandez" from his ringname (though some commentators such as Gorilla Monsoon still occasionally referred to him as Hernandez), as well as the Roman gladiator-style vest and wrist bands he wore during his ring entrance. He began carrying a long steel chain to the ring and re-emerged with a more muscular physique. On November 29, 1986 Saturday Night's Main Event VIII, Hercules received a shot at the WWF Heavyweight Championship, facing champion Hulk Hogan. Although he was able to put Hogan in the "Hercules Backbreaker" torture rack, he lost by pinfall in what was arguably the biggest match of his wrestling career.

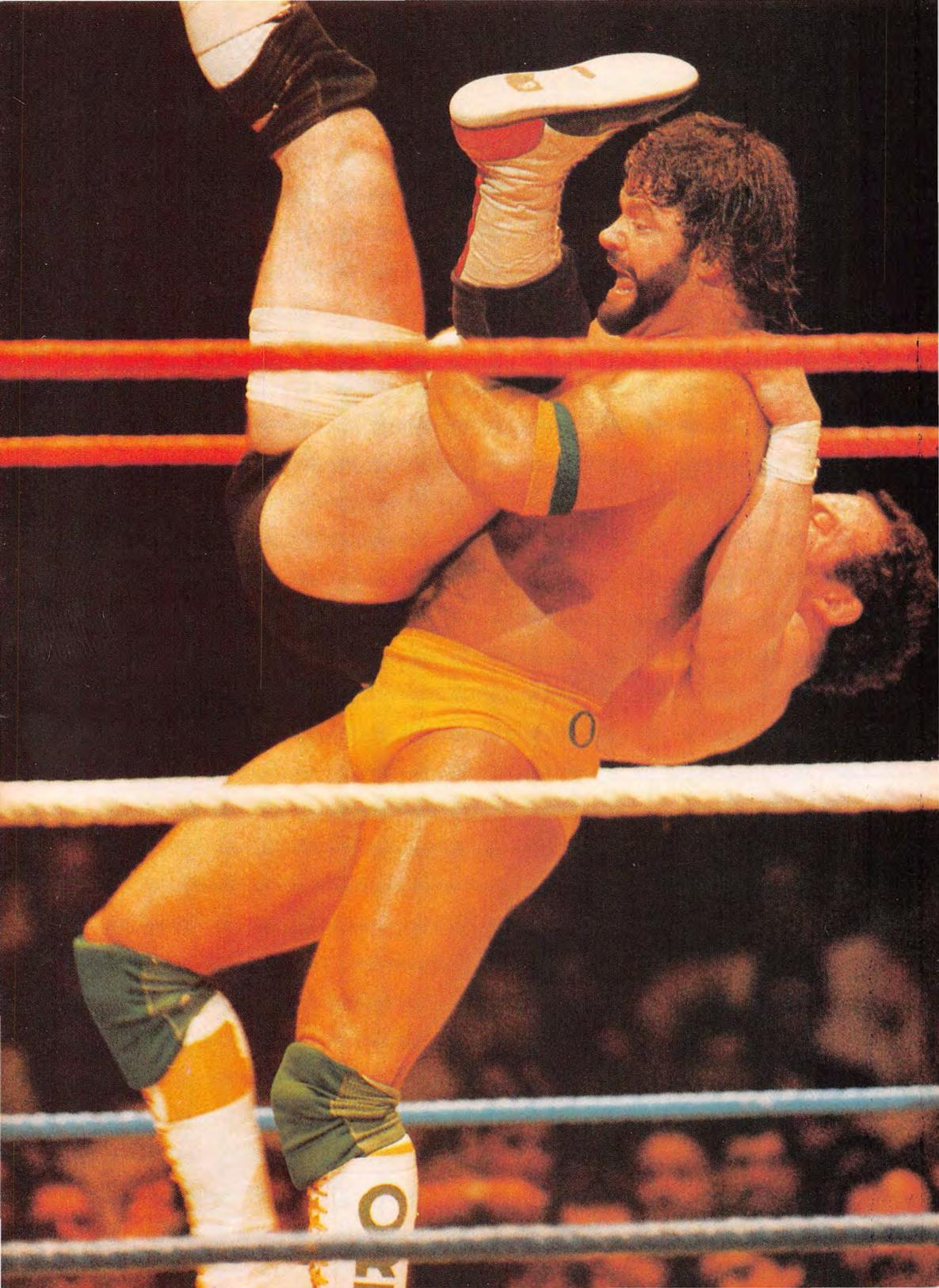
Hercules (black trunks) being sidewalk slammed by Billy Jack Haynes (yellow trunks), c. 1987

Also in the fall of 1986, Hercules rekindled a feud with Billy Jack Haynes that went back through every promotion the two were ever in together, including the WWF earlier in 1986. As part of the feud, Hercules started using Haynes' finishing move, the full nelson submission hold, as his finisher. On an episode of WWF Wrestling Challenge, Heenan called out Haynes saying he would like to see him get out of Hercules' version of the hold. Haynes promptly answered the challenge and was waiting for Hercules to apply the hold when Heenan appeared to have second thoughts. Haynes grew tired of the charade and shoved Heenan. This gave Hercules the opening he needed to clothesline Haynes. Haynes was unable to defend himself and Hercules applied the full nelson. When Haynes began powering out of the hold, Heenan kicked him in the abdomen and Hercules released the hold. This incident set the stage for their match at WrestleMania III at the Pontiac Silverdome in front of a reported 93,173 fans. The momentum swung back and forth throughout the contest until Haynes attempted to apply the full nelson; both men tumbled to the floor after Hercules reached the ropes. Haynes applied the full nelson on the floor as both men were counted out. Heenan broke the hold by driving a knee into the back of Haynes, who then turned his attention to Heenan and chased him into the ring, allowing Hercules to blindside him with a shot to the head with his steel chain wrapped around his fist, causing Haynes to bleed profusely (a closeup shot of Haynes on the mat clearly showed him "blading" himself in order to draw blood). The feud culminated some weeks later in a chain match that saw Hercules as the victor.

In early-1988, during an episode of WWF Superstars of Wrestling, Hercules was swinging his chain in the direction of another muscular power wrestler: the Ultimate Warrior. Warrior caught the chain, and the two began a tug of war, which led to the steel chain snapping at the middle. The broadcast commentators gave credit to the Warrior for snapping the chain, to the chagrin of Hercules and Heenan, though heel commentator Jesse Ventura contended that it took both Hercules and the Warrior to break the chain and not just the Warrior. This led to their grudge match at WrestleMania IV, which ended with Warrior pinning Hercules after pushing off from the turnbuckle while in Hercules' full nelson and landing on top of him before lifting his shoulder at the two count while referee Dave Hebner continued to count Hercules.

==== Rivalry with Ted DiBiase and Bobby Heenan (1988–1990) ====
During the fall of 1988, Bobby Heenan sold Hercules' contract to Ted DiBiase; DiBiase claimed that in Hercules, he had now purchased his own slave. The would-be transaction failed because Hercules resisted the proceedings which angered him. He stated that he was owned by "no man" and instantly turned face to feud with DiBiase. Marking the end of ties for Heenan and Hercules, Bobby Heenan would from now as commentator and in promotions refer to Fernandez as Herc the Jerk. Hercules defeated DiBiase's bodyguard Virgil in a battle for his "freedom" on Saturday Night's Main Event XVIII on November 16 after DiBiase contended that he should not have to dirty his hands to beat his own slave. Hercules and DiBiase were later on opposite teams at the Survivor Series 1988 where DiBiase eliminated Hercules from the contest, but Hercules then distracted DiBiase long enough to be eliminated by WWF World Champion Randy Savage who rolled him up for a pin while he was still gloating about eliminating Hercules. DiBiase would go on to win all of his matches against Hercules.

After the feud with DiBiase ended, Hercules had a series of matches with Haku (who was managed by Heenan). Despite pinning Haku at WrestleMania V, he did not become the "King" of the WWF. Hercules' career stalled following his feud with Haku. He was mainly used to help push the latest heels such as Dino Bravo, The Earthquake, who squashed him at WrestleMania VI, and Curt Hennig.

==== Power and Glory (1990–1991) ====
In the summer of 1990, Hercules turned heel alongside Paul Roma and the two formed Power and Glory, managed by Slick. They had a high-profile feud with The Rockers, defeating them at SummerSlam in Philadelphia and challenged WWF World Tag Team Champions The Hart Foundation. At WrestleMania VII, they lost to The Legion of Doom in less than a minute.

==== Final appearances (1991–1992) ====
After SummerSlam 1991, Roma left the WWF. Hercules spent the rest of his time in the WWF jobbing again, losing to wrestlers such as the Bushwackers, Jim Neidhart, the Big Boss Man and Sid Justice, and Intercontinental champion Bret Hart. Hercules lasted nearly forty minutes in the 1991 Royal Rumble; in 1992, he lasted less than a minute. His last televised WWF match was against Sid Justice at Madison Square Garden where he was squashed in under a minute. A clearly frustrated and fed up Hercules took a Powerbomb from Justice followed by a three count before no-selling the move by simply getting up unhurt and heading for the locker room.

=== World Championship Wrestling (1992) ===
After being with the WWF for seven years, Fernandez signed with World Championship Wrestling (WCW). He once again adopted a masked persona, this time as Super Invader, a supposed oriental assassin under the management of former Heenan Family stable mate, later rival, Harley Race. As Super Invader, he beat Todd Champion at WrestleWar 1992 and beat Marcus Bagwell in a dark match before the Great American Bash 1992. The highlight of his run as Super Invader was his appearance at Clash of the Champions XX teaming with Rick Rude, Jake Roberts, and Big Van Vader in an elimination tag team match against Sting, Nikita Koloff, and The Steiner Brothers. Although Sting eliminated him early, Super Invader's team won the match. By the end of 1992, Fernandez had left WCW.

=== New Japan Pro-Wrestling (1993–1994) ===
In March 1993, Fernandez debuted in New Japan Pro-Wrestling where he appeared as "Hercules Hernandez" once more, mainly teaming with fellow powerhouse wrestler Scott Norton to form the Jurassic Powers. They won the IWGP Tag Team Championship from the Hell Raisers (Hawk Warrior and Power Warrior) in August 1993 and held it for about four months before losing it back to the Hell Raisers at NJPW's January 4 Dome Show. While holding the title, the Jurassic Powers successfully defended against teams such as The Japanese Jollyjacks (Takayuki Iizuka and Akira Nogami), Masa Saito and Manabu Nakanishi, and the Barbarian and Haku. The team also had a series of matches with the Steiner Brothers and made it to the finals of the 1993 Super Grade Tag League where they lost to Keiji Mutoh and Hiroshi Hase.

=== Late career (1993–1999) ===
In 1993, Hercules wrestled for International World Class Championship Wrestling (IWCCW) and in 1994, he wrestled in the American Wrestling Federation (AWF) promotion taking part in the tournament to crown the first AWF champion. In 1999, Ray Fernandez retired from wrestling after working for various independent promotions across the world.

== Personal life ==
Fernandez met his high school sweetheart Debbie in 1974. They married in 1976 and had seven children, Nichole, Jeremy, Jaclyn, Amanda, Taylor, Katelyn, and Keith.

== Death ==
Fernandez died in his sleep in his home on March 6, 2004. The cause of death was attributed to heart disease according to his wife. He was buried with military honors at Florida National Cemetery in Bushnell, Florida.

== Championships and accomplishments ==
- Américas Wrestling Federation
  - AWF World Heavyweight Championship (1 time)
- Central States Wrestling
  - NWA Central States Tag Team Championship (2 times) – with Dewey Robertson
  - NWA Central States Television Championship (1 time)
- Championship Wrestling from Florida
  - NWA Florida Heavyweight Championship (2 times)
  - NWA Southern Heavyweight Championship (Florida version) (1 time)
- Independent Association of Wrestling
  - IAW Heavyweight Championship (1 time)
  - IAW Tag Team Championship (1 time) – with Paul Roma
- International Wrestling Federation
  - IWF Can-Am Championship (1 time)
- Mid-South Wrestling Association
  - Mid-South Tag Team Championship (1 time) – with Ted DiBiase
- New England Pro Wrestling Hall of Fame
  - Class of 2018
- New Japan Pro-Wrestling
  - IWGP Tag Team Championship (1 time) – with Scott Norton
- North American Wrestling Alliance
  - NAWA Heavyweight Championship (1 time)
- Pro Wrestling Illustrated
  - Ranked No. 220 of the 500 best singles wrestlers during the "PWI Years" in 2003.
- World Wrestling Federation
  - Slammy Award (1 time)
    - Bobby "The Brain" Heenan Scholarship Award (1987) with Haku, Tama, André the Giant, King Kong Bundy, and Harley Race
  - Battle Royal (1987)

== See also ==
- The Heenan Family
- The Jurassic Powers
- Power and Glory
- List of premature professional wrestling deaths
