= 1971 in professional wrestling =

1971 in professional wrestling describes the year's events in the world of professional wrestling.

== List of notable promotions ==
Only one promotion held notable shows in 1971.

Promotion Name	Abbreviation
Empresa Mexicana de Lucha Libre	EMLL

== Calendar of notable shows ==
Date	Promotion(s)	Event	Location	Main Event
April	EMLL	15. Aniversario de Arena México	Mexico City, Mexico	Uncertain
August 27	NWA Hollywood Wrestling	Memorial Coliseum Spectacular	Los Angeles, California	Freddie Blassie defeated John Tolos in a 2-out-of-3 Falls Match
September 24	EMLL	EMLL 38th Anniversary Show	Mexico City, Mexico	Rene Torres defeated Ciclon Veloz Jr. in a best two-out-of-three falls Lucha de Apuesta hair vs. hair match

== Championship changes ==
=== EMLL ===
NWA World Light Heavyweight Championship
incoming champion – El Solitario
Date	Winner	Event/Show	Note(s)
No title changes

=== IWE ===
Accomplishment	Winner	Date won	Notes
IWA World Series	Monster Roussimoff	June 24	

== Births ==
- Date of birth uncertain:
  - Billy Wiles
- January 1 - Rodney
- January 7 - CW Anderson
- January 28:
  - Yuji Yasuraoka
  - Sean Evans (died in 2007)
- February 10
  - Louie Spicolli (d. 1998)
  - Victoria
- February 14
  - Tommy Dreamer
  - Nelson Frazier, Jr. (d. 2014)
- February 22 – Super Caló
- February 25 - Sean O'Haire (died in 2014)
- February 28 - David Khakhaleishvili (died in 2021)
- March 1
  - Scotty Riggs
  - Yar (d. 2021)
- March 2
  - Manami Toyota
  - Satoru Asako
- March 6 – Val Venis
- March 9 - Tiger Ali Singh
- March 10 - Debbie Malenko
- March 11 - Johnny Knoxville
- March 18 - Mike Bell (d. 2008)
- March 23 - Hiroyoshi Tenzan
- April 4
  - John Zandig
  - Tony Jones (d. 2024)
- April 16 - Krusher Kong
- April 21 – Axl Rotten (d. 2016)
- May 7 - L.A. Smooth
- May 12 – Doug Basham
- May 18 - Cynthia Lynch
- May 19 – Psicosis
- May 22 – Halloween
- May 28 – Mosh
- June 5 - Glen Osbourne
- June 12 – Mark Henry
- June 15 – Chuck Palumbo
- June 18
  - Melissa Coates (died in 2021)
  - Chastity (wrestler)
- July 1 – Abismo Negro (d. 2009)
- July 5:
  - Cousin Sal
  - Jamie Dundee
- July 7 - Allan Funk
- July 14
  - Bubba Ray Dudley
  - Joey Styles
- July 15 - Pequeño Olímpico
- July 17 - Alexander Otsuka
- July 19 - Michael Modest
- August 5 - Hideki Hosaka (d. 2021)
- August 10 - Kevin Randleman (d.2016)
- August 25 – Crash Holly (d. 2003)
- September 1 - Sim Snuka
- September 8 - David Arquette
- September 12 – Shocker
- September 16 - Richard Slinger
- September 22 - Luther Reigns
- September 23 - Osamu Nishimura (died in 2025)
- September 24 - Bob Starr
- October 8 - Al Katrazz
- October 9 – Stevie Richards
- October 14 - Frank Wycheck (died in 2023)
- October 15 - Joey Abs
- October 19 – Sweet Saraya
- October 22 – Adam Flash
- October 24 - Dale Torborg
- November 1 - Kamikaze
- November 23 - Tetsuhiro Kuroda
- November 24 - Sumie Sakai
- December 1 - Trinity
- December 24 - Oro (d. 1993)

== Debuts ==
- Uncertain debut date

- Afa Anoa'i
- Jean Gagne
- King Cobra (wrestler)
- Ron Bass
- Tiger Conway Jr.

- May 9 - Tatsumi Fujinami
- June 21 - Kendo Nagasaki
- August 20 - Tinieblas
- September 16 - El Signo
- October 1 - Mano Negra

== Retirements ==
- Whipper Billy Watson (1936 – 1971)

== Deaths ==
- May 12 - Tor Johnson, 67
- June 16 - Alberto Torres (wrestler), 37
- June 26 - Hans Steinke, 78
- July 12 – Yvon Robert, 56
- July 24 – Hercules Cortez, 39
- October 29 - Harry Light, 73
