= Chuck Austin =

American professional wrestler

Personal information
- Born: Charles Austin

Professional wrestling career
- Ring name(s): Chuck Austin; Charles Austin
- Debut: December 1990

Charles Austin is an American former professional wrestler. He had been a college football standout at the University of North Carolina and after graduating, developed an interest in professional wrestling, starting his own small promotion in his hometown.

In December 1990, after having trained for six months, Austin traveled to a World Wrestling Federation (WWF) show in Tampa, Florida, where he approached WWF staff and offered his services as a jobber, a wrestler whose job is to lose to a promotion's major stars and promote their image. He was subsequently assigned to work a tag-team match with Lanny Poffo against Marty Jannetty and Shawn Michaels, who at the time were known as the Rockers. While the bulk of the match progressed normally, near the end, as Austin received Jannetty's finishing move, the "Rocker Dropper", his head struck the mat, breaking his neck and immediately paralyzing him. The live event was taped for television, but never aired.

Austin would subsequently sue the WWF and Jannetty. In 1994, a jury awarded him $26.7 million of which Jannetty had to pay $500,000. The WWF appealed the ruling and eventually settled out of court for $10 million. After this event, the WWF began using only experienced, contracted wrestlers.

In February 2015, Austin appeared on an NBC news broadcast in Orlando, Florida about pharmacists who were refusing to fill pain medication prescriptions regardless of their doctor's prescription. In an American Journal broadcast in the 1990s, he had been able to move with the assistance of canes and was able to lift small amounts of weight with help from his son, however the 2015 broadcast showed him in a motorized wheelchair and complaining of significant pain.
