= NWA Central States Television Championship =

Professional wrestling championship

- Marty Jannetty, the 24th Central States Television Champion

Details
- Promotion: Heart of America Sports Attractions / Central States Wrestling
- Date established: 1979
- Current champion: Inactive
- Date won: 1988
Statistics
- First champion: Bob Sweetan
- Most reigns: Art Crews (3 times)
- Longest reign: Vinnie Valentino (500 days) (Note: With gaps in the championship history it is possible someone else held the championship for a longer period of time but that has not been verified.)
- Shortest reign: Gypsy Joe (10 days) (Note: With gaps in the championship history it is possible someone else held the championship for a shorter period of time but that has not been verified.)
- Oldest champion: Gypsy Joe (50 years, 275 days)
- Youngest champion: Bobby Fulton (22 years, 70 days)
- Heaviest champion: Gene Lewis (301 lb (137 kg))
- Lightest champion: Marty Jannetty (219 lb (99 kg))

The NWA Central States Television Championship was the secondary singles championship for the Heart of America Sports Attractions / Central States Wrestling promotion from 1977 until the promotion ceased to exist in 1988. Because the championship is a professional wrestling championship, it is not won or lost competitively but instead by the decision of the bookers of a wrestling promotion. The championship is awarded after the chosen team "wins" a match to maintain the illusion that professional wrestling is a competitive sport.

== Title History ==
Key
| No. | Overall reign number |
| Reign | Reign number for the specific champion |
| Days | Number of days held |

| No. | Champion | Championship change | | | Reign statistics | | Notes | Ref. |
| No. | Champion | Date | Event | Location | Reign | Days | Notes | Ref. |
|---|---|---|---|---|---|---|---|---|
| 1 | Bob Sweetan | 1977 | CSW show | (Note: The location of the match was not captured as part of the championship documentation.) | 1 | (Note: The date the championship was won has not been documented which means the championship reign lasted anywhere between 1 day and 271 days) | Records do not indicate how Bob Sweetan became the first Television Champion | |
| 2 | Black Angus Campbell | September 29, 1977 | CSW show | Kansas City, Kansas | 1 | 87 | | |
| 3 | Bob Sweetan | December 25, 1977 | CSW show | Kansas City, Kansas | 2 | (Note: The date the championship was lost has not been documented which means the championship reign lasted anywhere between 1 day and 1,133 days) | | |
Championship history is unrecorded from December 25, 1977 to January 1981.
| 4 | Terry Taylor | January 1981 | CSW show | | 1 | (Note: The date the championship was won and lost has not been documented which means the championship reign lasted anywhere between 1 day and 125 days) | Defeated Buzz Tyler in a tournament to win the vacant championship. | |
| 5 | Bobby Jaggers | 1981 | CSW show | | 1 | (Note: The date the championship was won has not been documented which means the championship reign lasted anywhere between 1 day and 125 days) | | |
| 6 | Rufus R. Jones | May 7, 1981 | CSW show | Kansas City, Kansas | 1 | 50 | | |
| 7 | Gene Lewis | June 26, 1981 | CSW show | Kansas City, Kansas | 1 | 118 | | |
| 8 | Dewey Robertson | October 22, 1981 | CSW show | Kansas City, Kansas | 1 | (Note: The date the championship was lost has not been documented which means the championship reign lasted anywhere between 1 day and 69 days) | | |
| 9 | Sir Oliver Humperdink | 1981 | CSW show | | 1 | (Note: The date the championship was won and lost has not been documented which means the championship reign lasted anywhere between 1 day and 68 days) | | |
| 10 | Dewey Robertson | 1981 | CSW show | | 2 | (Note: The date the championship was won has not been documented which means the championship reign lasted anywhere between 49 days and 117days) | | |
| 11 | Gene Lewis | February 18, 1982 | CSW show | Kansas City, Kansas | 2 | 49 | | |
| 12 | Mark Romero | April 8, 1982 | CSW show | Kansas City, Kansas | 1 | 49 | | |
| 13 | Hercules Hernandez | May 27, 1982 | CSW show | Kansas City, Kansas | 1 | 200 | | |
| 14 | Mark Romero | December 13, 1982 | CSW show | Kansas City, Kansas | 2 | 31 | | |
| 15 | Roger Kirby | January 13, 1983 | CSW show | Kansas City, Kansas | 1 | 112 | | |
| 16 | Jerry Brown | May 5, 1983 | CSW show | Kansas City, Kansas | 1 | (Note: The date the championship was lost has not been documented which means the championship reign lasted anywhere between 57 days and 86 days) | | |
| 17 | Roger Kirby | July 1983 | CSW show | | 2 | (Note: The date the championship was won has not been documented which means the championship reign lasted anywhere between 124 days and 153 days) | | |
| 18 | Bobby Fulton | December 1, 1983 | CSW show | Kansas City, Kansas | 1 | (Note: The date the championship was lost has not been documented which means the championship reign lasted anywhere between 31 days and 61 days) | | |
| — | Vacated | January 1984 | — | — | — | — | Championship was vacated when Bobby Fulton left the promotion. | |
| 19 | Buck Robley | January 18, 1984 | CSW show | Des Moines, Iowa | 1 | (Note: The date the championship was lost has not been documented which means the championship reign lasted anywhere between 43 days and 73 days) | | |
| — | Vacated | March 1984 | — | — | — | — | Championship was vacated when Buck Robley left the promotion. | |
| 20 | Art Crews | May 21, 1984 | CSW show | Topeka, Kansas | 1 | (Note: The date the championship was lost has not been documented which means the championship reign lasted anywhere between 1 day and 91 days) | Defeats Luke Graham in a tournament final | |
| — | Vacated | 1984 | — | — | — | — | No sources document why the championship was vacated | |
| 21 | Art Crews | August 21, 1984 | CSW show | Topeka, Kansas | 2 | 12 | | |
| 22 | Gypsy Joe | September 2, 1984 | CSW show | Kansas City, Kansas | 1 | 10 | | |
| 23 | Buzz Tyler | September 12, 1984 | CSW show | Lincoln, Missouri | 1 | 31 | | |
| 24 | Marty Jannetty | October 13, 1984 | CSW show | Des Moines, Iowa | 1 | 145 | | |
| 25 | Gary Royal | March 7, 1985 | CSW show | Kansas City, Kansas | 1 | 253 | | |
| 26 | Art Crews | November 15, 1985 | CSW show | Wichita, Kansas | 3 | (Note: The date the championship was WON/ost has not been documented which means the championship reign lasted anywhere between 47 days and 77 days) | | |
| — | Vacated | January 1986 | — | — | — | — | Championship was vacated when Art Crews left the promotion. | |
| 27 | Akio Sato | March 13, 1986 | CSW show | Kansas City, Kansas | 1 | 71 | Wins a 14-man battle royal, eliminating Tommy Wright. | |
| 28 | Mike George | May 23, 1986 | CSW show | St. Joseph, Missouri | 1 | (Note: The date the championship was lost has not been documented which means the championship reign lasted anywhere between 1 day and 23 days) | | |
| — | Vacated | 1986 | — | — | — | — | No documented explanation found for why the championship was vacated. | |
| 29 | Vinnie Valentino | June 16, 1986 | CSW show | Kansas City, Kansas | 1 | 530 | | |
| 30 | Rip Rogers | November 28, 1987 | CSW show | Des Moines, Iowa | 1 | (Note: The date the championship was lost has not been documented which means the championship reign lasted anywhere between 3 days and 33 days) | | |
| 31 | Mike George | December 1987 | CSW show | | 2 | (Note: The date the championship was won has not been documented which means the championship reign lasted anywhere between 1 day and 31 days) | Awarded the Championship when Rogers left the promotion | |
| 32 | Masa Chono | January 1, 1988 | CSW show | Des Moines, Iowa | 1 | (Note: The date the championship was abandoned has not been documented which means the championship reign lasted anywhere between 91 days and 120 days) | | |
| — | Deactivated | N/A | — | — | — | — | Promotion closed | |

== Reigns by combined length ==
Key

| Symbol | Meaning |
|---|---|
| ¤ | The exact length of at least one title reign is uncertain, so the shortest possible length is used. |

| Rank | Wrestler | # of reigns | Combined days |
|---|---|---|---|
| 1 | Vinnie Valentino | 1 | 530 |
| 2 | Gary Royal | 1 | 253 |
| 3 | Roger Kirby | 2 | 236¤ |
| 4 | Hercules Hernandez | 1 | 200 |
| 5 | Marty Jannetty | 1 | 145 |
| 6 | Masa Chono | 1 | 91¤ |
| 7 | Mark Romero | 2 | 80 |
| 8 | Akio Sato | 1 | 71 |
| 9 | Dewey Robertson | 2 | 71¤ |
| 10 | Gene Lewis | 2 | 67 |
| 11 | Art Crews | 3 | 60¤ |
| 12 | Jerry Brown | 1 | 57¤ |
| 13 | Rufus R. Jones | 1 | 50 |
| 14 | Buck Robley | 1 | 43¤ |
| 15 | Bobby Fulton | 1 | 31¤ |
| 16 | Buzz Tyler | 1 | 31 |
| 17 | Black Angus Campbell | 1 | 29 |
| 18 | Gypsy Joe | 1 | 10 |
| 19 | Rip Rogers | 1 | 3¤ |
| 20 | Bob Sweetan | 2 | 2¤ |
| 21 | Mike George | 2 | 2¤ |
| 22 | Bobby Jaggers | 1 | 1¤ |
| 23 | Oliver Humperdink | 1 | 1¤ |
| 24 | Terry Taylor | 1 | 1¤ |

== See also ==
- National Wrestling Alliance
- Central States Wrestling
