= The Missing Link (wrestler) =

Canadian professional wrestler (1939–2007)

Personal information
- Born: Byron James John Robertson; February 28, 1939 Hamilton, Ontario, Canada
- Died: August 16, 2007 (aged 68) Hamilton, Ontario, Canada
- Cause of death: Lung cancer
- Spouse: Gail Sterling (div. 1995)

Professional wrestling career
- Ring name(s): The Missing Link; The Masked Crusader; Troy Steel; Dewey Robertson
- Billed height: 6 ft 2 in (1.88 m)
- Billed weight: 250 lb (110 kg)
- Billed from: "Parts Unknown"
- Trained by: Jack Wentworth; Al Spittles
- Debut: 1961

Byron James John "Dewey" Robertson (February 28, 1939 – August 16, 2007) was a Canadian professional wrestler, known best by his ring name The Missing Link.

As The Missing Link, Robertson wore blue and green face paint and shaved portions of his head while letting the hair grow in other areas. His gimmick was similar to that of George Steele and Kamala, a crazy out-of-control wild man who needed a trainer or manager to lead him to the ring. During his matches, Robertson would often ram his own head repeatedly into the turnbuckle or wooden chair, headbutt and dive head first onto an opponent.

He achieved his greatest fame late in his career, wrestling in WCCW, managed by Skandor Akbar and in the WWF, managed by Bobby Heenan and Jimmy Hart in the mid-1980s.

== Professional wrestling career ==
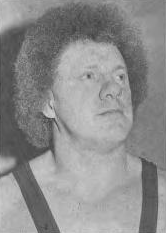
Robertson, c. 1983

=== Early career (1961–1979) ===
Robertson started wrestling in his native Canada in the 1961 as Dewey Robertson. He was a very popular babyface in the Toronto area. It was long believed that he was a protege of former NWA world champion Whipper Billy Watson (William Potts), but Watson did not start him in the business. Watson was, however, the godfather of Robertson’s sons. He left to wrestle in the Southern United States and Australia in 1973, but returned a year later as "The Masked Crusader" with manager John St. John (John Lang). He was on a crusade to keep wrestling scientific but was soon unmasked by The Sheik. After that, Robertson formed a tag team called "The Crusaders" with Billy Red Lyons. He also owned a gym in the 1970s, and had a famous television spot where he tore up a phone book in a supermarket ad.

Robertson's first title victory came in May 1973 when he teamed with Dennis Stamp to win the Tri-State version of the NWA United States Tag Team Championship. They held the belts until July, when they dropped them to Alex Perez and El Gran Tapio. Robertson found more success in tag team wrestling the following year while competing in Toronto, Ontario. He teamed with Billy Red Lyons to win the Toronto version of the NWA International Tag Team Championship from The Love Brothers (Hartford and Reginald) on June 23, 1974. The Love Brothers regained the belts on September 8, but Robertson and Lyons won them back on December 29. They then held the belts for over six months before dropping the titles to Mike and Pat Kelly in June 1975. Robertson and Lyons had one final reign as champions, when they won a rematch on August 24. During one match his right leg was broken while performing a sunset flip on one of the Kelly twins. He and Lyons also toured Japan in 1977. Robertson worked for the World Wide Wrestling Federation from 1977 to 1978.

=== National Wrestling Alliance (1979–1983) ===
In 1979, Robertson wrestled in the NWA's Jim Crockett Promotions as a heel with "Nature Boy" Buddy Rogers as his manager. He used Rogers' figure-four leg lock as his finisher. That year, he also won a tournament for the vacant NWA Canadian Heavyweight Championship in Toronto by defeating Gene Kiniski, Ken Patera and then Greg Valentine in the final round. He fought both NWA world champion Harley Race and AWA world champion Nick Bockwinkel in separate matches in Toronto. With Bockwinkel he won with the Canadian heavyweight belt on the line. In a rematch with the AWA title for grabs they went to a draw. He later lost the Canadian title to the Great Hossien. He was offered a contract as NWA World heavyweight champion, but the NWA had concerns over his drinking habits.

Into 1980 he traveled between Ontario and Mid-Atlantic Championship Wrestling, where he continued to wrestle as a tag team competitor. He won the NWA Mid-Atlantic Tag Team Championship by teaming with George Wells to defeat The Sheepherders on December 12, 1980. The pair held the belts for almost two months before dropping it to Genichiro Tenryu and Mr. Fuji in February 1981. Robertson regained the championship later that year, however, by teaming with Johnny Weaver to take the belts from Tenryu and Fuji.

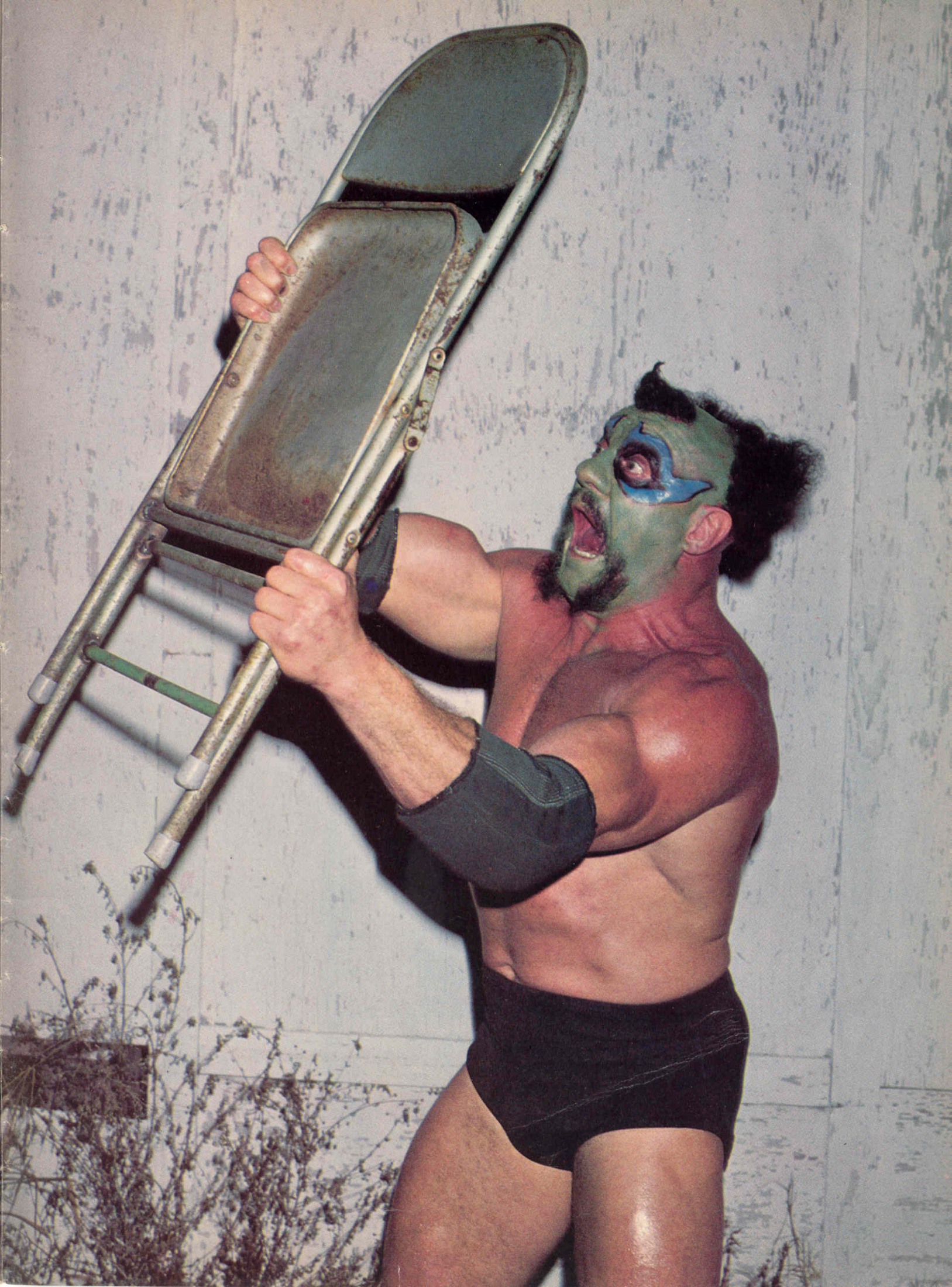
The Missing Link, circa 1985

Robertson moved to Central States Wrestling, where he won the majority of his titles. On October 22, 1981, he won the NWA Central States Television Championship with a victory over Gene Lewis. He lost the belt to Oliver Humperdink later that year but soon regained it in a rematch. On February 18, 1982, however, he dropped the belt back to Lewis. This allowed Robertson to focus on the NWA Central States Tag Team Championship, which he won a total of five times. His first reign came in October 1981 when he teamed with Rufus R. Jones to defeat Buzz Tyler and J. J. Dillon. His next reign came in March 1982 when he teamed with Steve Regal to win the belts from Roger Kirby and Jerry Valiant. The title changed hands twice more that month, as Kirby and Valiant quickly regained the title only to drop it back to Robertson and Regal. Two months later, Kirby and Valiant won the belts back again. Robertson found a new partner, however, and won the championship by teaming with Hercules Hernandez in August. The reign lasted less than a month, but Robertson and Hernandez held the belts one final time after another victory in September 1982. The following year, Robertson's main success came as a singles wrestler. On February 10, 1983, he won the NWA Central States Heavyweight Championship with a victory over Manny Fernandez. He lost the belt to Bob Brown two months later but regained it in a rematch the following week. Robertson's final title reign ended when he dropped the title to Race on June 2, 1983.

=== Origin of the Missing Link (1983–1985) ===
In 1983, he changed his look and became "Max, the Missing Link" in Mid-South Wrestling with a gimmick of looking and acting bizarre. Painting his face green with an odd haircut and grew a horseshoe moustache. He later went to World Class Championship Wrestling under Skandor Akbar's Devastation Inc. stable simply called "The Missing Link" and feuded with the Von Erichs and The Fabulous Freebirds. He later wrestled in Championship Wrestling from Florida for a short stint and feuded with Bugsy McGraw.

=== World Wrestling Federation (1985) ===
A full-page photo of The Missing Link appeared in the April 29, 1985, issue of Sports Illustrated, which had Hulk Hogan on the cover and reported on Vince McMahon's aggressive strategy to take his World Wrestling Federation national. Two weeks later, The Missing Link made his WWF debut on May 20, 1985, in Madison Square Garden; he was accompanied to the ring by manager Bobby "The Brain" Heenan and defeated S. D. Jones in less than two minutes. During his brief run in the WWF, most of his matches were against jobbers. Many times, he defeated S. D. Jones, George Wells, Rick McGraw, Salvatore Bellomo, Tony Garea, Jose Luis Rivera, Lanny Poffo, and Swede Hanson. However, he typically lost when matched against bigger stars. His first recorded loss in the WWF came on July 22, 1985, at the Nassau Coliseum, against George "The Animal" Steele. On July 24, in Buffalo, New York, he lost to Bruno Sammartino by countout. During this match, he busted several of the chairs in which the ringside commissioners were sitting and the incident almost had the WWF banned from the city. On August 18, he was pinned by Intercontinental Champion Tito Santana at the first-ever WWF show in Tampa, Florida. He also lost matches to Ivan Putski, Tony Atlas, and B. Brian Blair.

While in the WWF, he fought Mad Dog Vachon three times: a draw at the Met Center in Minneapolis (August 25); a win by countout in Milwaukee (September 5); and a loss in Denver (September 20). In September 1985, Heenan traded The Missing Link and Adrian Adonis to manager Jimmy Hart in exchange for King Kong Bundy. In his final televised match on WWF Prime Time Wrestling on November 12 (taped October 12 at the Boston Garden), Paul Orndorff pinned The Missing Link in less than five minutes with a high knee after the Link was distracted by his manager, Jimmy Hart, shouting into his megaphone on the ring apron; this was a $50,000 bounty match (Heenan would have paid the Link the bounty if the Link had put Orndorff out of action). He abruptly left the WWF in October 1985 due to drug issues.

=== Later career (1985–2007) ===
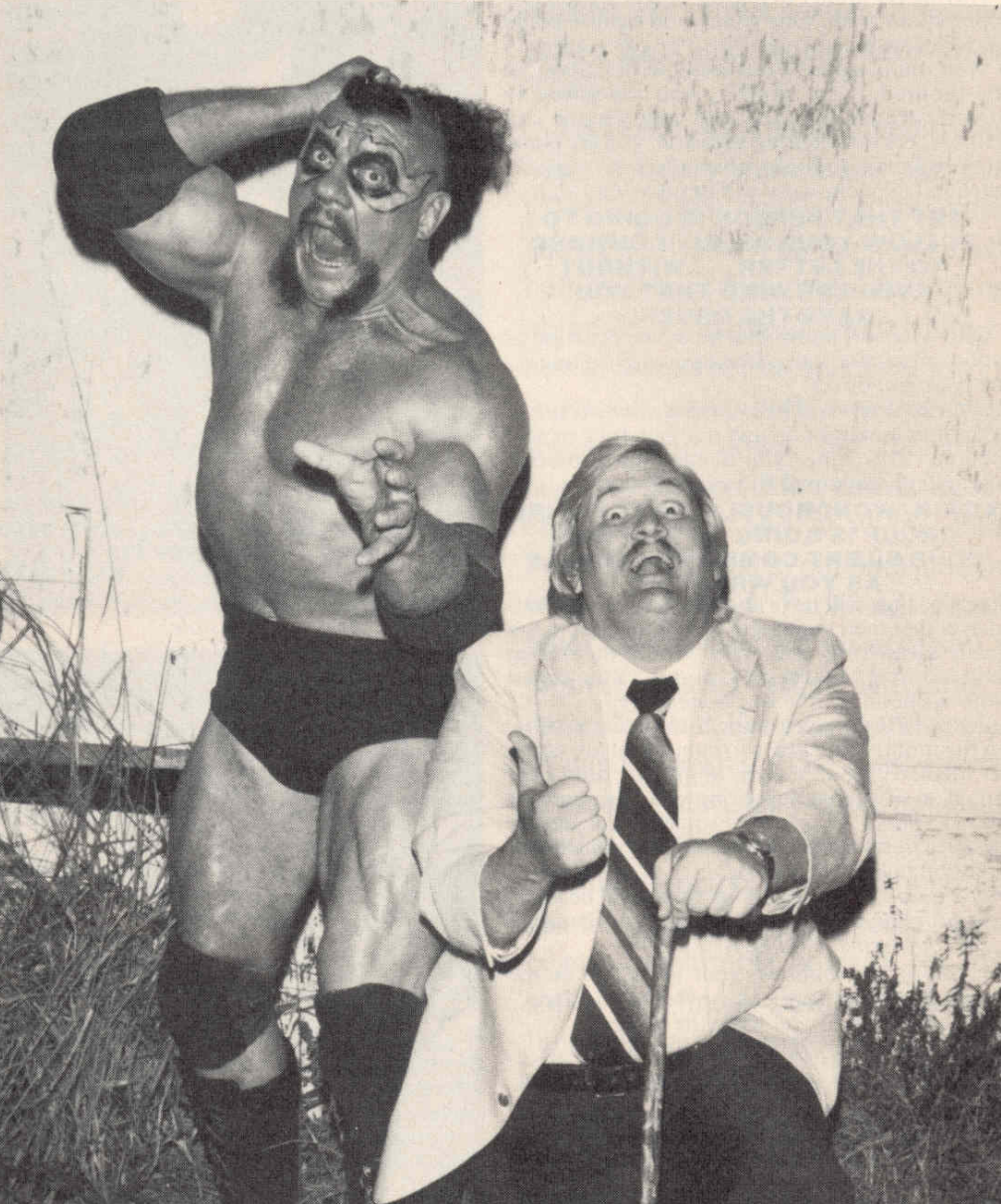
The Missing Link (left) and his manager Percy Pringle III (right), circa 1985

In November 1985, he went to World Class Championship Wrestling and was first managed by Percy Pringle only to turn face after saving Sunshine from an attack from The Great Kabuki then again from Percy Pringle and Rick Rude. In late 1986, he left for the Universal Wrestling Federation where he was managed by Dark Journey. He would later return to World Class and wrestle in World Wrestling Council in Puerto Rico. Wrestled a tag match for CWA against Sexton Hardcastle (later known as Edge) on April 28, 1995. He retired in 1996, but returned on the independent circuit as The Missing Link in 2004. His last match was against Al Jihad in Buffalo, NY on May 5, 2007.

== Personal life ==
Robertson's parents Ethel and Kenneth divorced in 1954. He attended Westdale High School in Hamilton. As a teen he worked at a golf course in Hamilton. He later worked various jobs from salesman, steelworker and even an arena manager. Robertson's sons, Jason and Mark, were also professional wrestlers. He was married to Gail Stirling for many years but they divorced in 1995. According to Bill Mercer, while married they lived in a naturist community. From the late 1970s to his death, he battled substance abuse. For a few months, he and his wife were homeless until they received help from fellow wrestler Gene Anderson in North Carolina. Once they returned to southern Ontario a police officer he befriended helped him find work as a court bailiff in Hamilton.

In June 1994, Robertson attempted suicide by overdosing on an anti-depressant medication. He often self medicated with marijuana and alcohol, and he took an entire bottle of the anti-depressant medication. He was eventually discovered where he was taken to a nearby hospital where he later recovered.

He admitted to taking steroids and abusing alcohol during his career. In 2006, his autobiography Bang Your Head: The Real Story of The Missing Link was published by ECW Press. In it, he discussed his addiction to steroids, alcohol, and drugs. He also did lectures in schools and prisons on substance abuse. He was a close friend of Ted DiBiase at that stage and received help from a Christian group in Ontario. He also served on the governor general's panel on substance abuse. He also was a court constable in the Hamilton court system. He was a respected and appreciated volunteer for many years after achieving sobriety, at the Hamilton Wentworth Detention Centre. While there, he mentored inmates on physical fitness and recovery.

== Death ==
Robertson died of lung cancer on August 16, 2007, after a long illness. He was living in Hamilton, Ontario at the time of his death.

== Championships and accomplishments ==
- Central States Wrestling
  - NWA Central States Heavyweight Championship (2 times)
  - NWA Central States Tag Team Championship (5 times) – with Rufus R. Jones (1), Steve Regal (2), Hercules Hernandez (2)
  - NWA Central States Television Championship (2 times)
- Maple Leaf Wrestling
  - NWA Canadian Heavyweight Championship (Toronto version) (1 time)
  - NWA International Tag Team Championship (Toronto version) (3 times) – with Billy Red Lyons
- Mid-Atlantic Championship Wrestling
  - NWA Mid-Atlantic Tag Team Championship (2 times) – with George Wells (1) and Johnny Weaver (1)
- NWA Tri-State
  - NWA United States Tag Team Championship (Tri-State version) (1 time) – with Dennis Stamp
- Pro Wrestling Illustrated
  - PWI ranked him No. 292 of the 500 best singles wrestlers during the "PWI Years" in 2003.
