= Scott Norton =

American professional wrestler (born 1958)

- Norton in 2018

Personal information
- Born: June 15, 1958 (age 68) Minneapolis, Minnesota, U.S.

Professional wrestling career
- Ring name: Scott Norton
- Billed height: 6 ft 3 in (191 cm)
- Billed weight: 360 lb (163 kg)
- Billed from: Minneapolis, Minnesota
- Trained by: Brad Rheingans; Masa Saito; Verne Gagne
- Debut: April 15, 1989
- Retired: 2022

Scott Norton (born June 15, 1958) is an American semi-retired professional wrestler and author. He is best known for his tenures in World Championship Wrestling and New Japan Pro-Wrestling, in which he was a member of the New World Order and nWo Japan. He is a two-time world champion, having won the IWGP Heavyweight Championship twice.

== Early life ==
Norton started out as a professional arm wrestler. He won over 30 championships during his days as an arm wrestler, including four U.S. National championships, and gained the nickname "Flash" due to his quickness in winning matches. His status in the arm wrestling world earned him a role as an extra in Sylvester Stallone's arm wrestling movie, Over the Top. While touring the arm wrestling circuit in Japan, Norton was approached by New Japan Pro-Wrestling about becoming a professional wrestler, but he turned it down initially. In addition to his professional arm wrestling career, Norton also worked as a bodyguard for Prince during the musician's 1999 and Purple Rain Tours.

== Professional wrestling career ==
=== Early career (1989–1990) ===
After finally deciding to enter professional wrestling, Norton was trained to wrestle by former Olympic wrestler Brad Rheingans. Despite Norton's inexperience, Verne Gagne decided to debut him before he was totally finished with his training, putting him on television as a regular performer for the American Wrestling Association in 1989. He sometimes teamed with John Nord as the Yukon Lumberjacks. He challenged then World Champions Hulk Hogan, Ric Flair and Larry Zbyszko to a televised arm wrestling match. If anyone beat him, he would pay them (kayfabe) $1,000,000. Nothing became of the challenge.

By the end of 1989, Norton left the AWA and went to Pacific Northwest Wrestling to further his career. In PNW, Norton wrestled as a face with a lumberjack gimmick and the nickname "Flapjack". He briefly reformed his tag team with John Nord to reprise their lumberjack gimmick from the AWA. In 1990, Norton became a singles competitor. He won the NWA Pacific Northwest Heavyweight Championship from Brian Adams on May 12, 1990, but was stripped of the title two weeks later after attacking several wrestlers.

=== New Japan Pro-Wrestling (1990–1995) ===
In 1990, Norton signed with New Japan Pro-Wrestling. Upon debuting for the promotion, Norton alternated between tag team and mid-card singles matches. Norton appeared at both joint NJPW/World Championship Wrestling Starrcade in Egg Dome shows, giving him exposure to WCW executives.

The working agreement between NJPW and WCW meant that the Steiner Brothers would tour Japan on a regular basis, often wrestling against Scott Norton alongside a variety of partners. On November 5, 1991, Norton acted as a substitute for the injured Scott Steiner in an IWGP Tag Team Championship match. Norton and Rick Steiner were unsuccessful on the night and lost the tag team titles to Hiroshi Hase and Keiji Mutoh. About a year after losing the title he never technically held, Norton won the Tag Team Championship properly when he and Tony Halme defeated the Steiner Brothers on November 22, 1992. They only held on to the title for a little over three weeks before losing them to the Hell Raisers (Road Warrior Hawk and Power Warrior).

After splitting up with Halme, Norton started to team with Hercules Hernandez in March 1993. Hercules was a fellow powerhouse wrestler and the two formed the Jurassic Powers, a team that won the IWGP Tag Team Championship from the Hell Raisers. The Powers held the title for about four months before losing them back to the Hell Raisers at NJPW's January 4 Dome Show. While holding the title, the Jurassic Powers successfully defended against teams such as Keiji Mutoh and Hiroshi Hase, The Nasty Boys, Takayuki Iizuka and Akira Nogami, Jake "The Snake" Roberts and Brutus Beefcake, Masa Saito and Manabu Nakanishi and The Barbarian and Haku in non-title competition. The team also and made it to the finals of the 1993 Super Grade Tag League, where they lost to Keiji Mutoh and Hiroshi Hase.

After breaking up with Hernandez, Norton failed to achieve much notoriety in the singles ranks nor in the tag team division, where he teamed with a variety of partners such as Mike Enos, Ron Simmons, Masahiro Chono, Osamu Kido, and Road Warrior Hawk.

=== World Championship Wrestling (1993) ===
Norton returned to the U.S. and signed with World Championship Wrestling in 1993. The promoters first tried to get Norton over with the fans as a villain by feuding with Sting, but Norton quit before Slamboree '93: A Legends' Reunion and was replaced by The Prisoner.

=== World Wrestling Federation (1994) ===
Norton made an appearance on a WWF house show in Sunrise, Florida on October 9, 1994. He was defeated by Thurman "Sparky" Plugg.

=== World Championship Wrestling (1995–1999) ===
Norton returned to WCW in September 1995, where he briefly feuded with Shark, after the latter inadvertently helped Randy Savage defeat Norton on the September 11 edition of WCW Monday Nitro.

==== Fire and Ice (1996) ====
During a WCW Saturday Night taping, Norton squared off against Ice Train. The bout ended in a double count out when both men clotheslined the other, knocking each out. After the match, the two shook hands and Norton explained to announcer Gene Okerlund that he felt that they would make a formidable tag team because of their similar wrestling styles. The team was quickly named Fire and Ice. At Slamboree, Norton and Ice Train were randomly drawn to be on the same team and easily defeated the makeshift team of Big Bubba Rogers and Stevie Ray. The team advanced to the "Lord of The Ring" battle royal, but neither won the match.

At The Great American Bash, Fire and Ice came head to head with Norton's long-time rivals, the Steiner Brothers. The two teams were engaged in a mini-feud of sorts, as the two teams tried to show who was the better powerhouse team. On that night the Steiner Brothers won, but Fire and Ice were not deterred. After a pre-PPV loss to The Rock 'n' Roll Express at Bash at the Beach, dissension started to appear between the two, a dissension that turned into battle as Norton attacked Ice Train after another team loss. Norton defeated Ice Train at Hog Wild in a submission match, but lost to Ice Train in a rematch a month later.

After Fire and Ice ended, Norton split his time between WCW and NJPW, achieving more success in NJPW than WCW most notably in the tag team division. Norton and Shinya Hashimoto teamed up and won the Super Grade Tag League in 1996 after beating Keiji Mutoh and Rick Steiner in the finals.

==== New World Order and Vicious and Delicious (1996–1999) ====
In late 1996, Norton joined the New World Order (nWo), which gave his WCW career some direction after the breakup of Fire and Ice. In the nWo, Norton teamed with Buff Bagwell as Vicious and Delicious. They feuded with the Steiner Brothers, but were never able to win the World Tag Team Championship.

During his nWo days, Norton traveled back and forth to NJPW, where he was a member of nWo Japan, and became NJPW's gaijin ace while also becoming one of the few wrestlers to be a regular member of both factions. On September 23, 1998, he won the vacant IWGP Heavyweight Championship by defeating Yuji Nagata. Norton's title win was mentioned only once in America on a broadcast of Nitro while he was seen holding the belt, but Norton's standing in the WCW version of the nWo never changed from this fact mostly due to the nWo's leader being Hollywood Hogan, who was the WCW World Heavyweight Champion. Norton held the IWGP Heavyweight Title for four months before losing the title to Keiji Mutoh. Norton was only the third foreigner to have ever held the IWGP Championship at the time, the others being Big Van Vader & Salman Hashimikov.

Norton soon began playing a smaller role in WCW, becoming part of the nWo "B-Team", which often placed him in mid-lower card matches; although he would continue to squash jobbers frequently in singles competition. While in NJPW, however, Norton was seen as a main eventer and constant threat to world champions. He left WCW completely in 1999 after losing a match against Goldberg on the September 30 episode of Thunder and began focusing his efforts on NJPW, where he was part of Masahiro Chono's Team 2000.

=== Return to NJPW (1999–2006) ===
On March 17, 2001, Norton defeated Kensuke Sasaki in Nagoya, Japan to capture the IWGP Heavyweight Championship a second time. His second reign was shorter than his first, and he lost to Kazuyuki Fujita on his first defense. After the loss, Norton started to team with fellow WCW alumnus Rick Steiner whenever Steiner toured Japan, but otherwise he was planted solidly in the mid-card as a test any hopeful world title challenger would have to pass. After briefly retiring in 2004, Norton returned later that year and resumed teaming with Steiner. Following the 2006 New Japan Cup, he left NJPW after 16 years, becoming a freelancer in the process.

=== Late career (2006–2022) ===
In mid-2006, Norton started his own independent promotion, Wild West Championship Wrestling, based in the southwest of United States, where he acted as both a booker and wrestler until its closure later that year.

After wrestling for Hustle from mid to late 2007, Norton took a near-year long hiatus before returning on October 24, 2008, where he and Masahiro Chono defeated Don Frye and Yoshihiro Takayama in the first part of the Pro Wrestling Expo. The next day, Norton, Frye and Dick Togo lost to Chono, Eric Young and Kohei Sato.

In an August 2010 interview, Norton revealed that he would be interested in a run with Total Nonstop Action Wrestling. At the time, Norton lived in Brentwood, Tennessee, which is located minutes outside of TNA's headquarters in Nashville, Tennessee and commented that wrestling is, "something I enjoy doing. You miss it. I can still perform at a high level. I’m still a big, strong man. I would like to give it another shot. If I can get a couple-year run, I'll fold up my tent and call it a day."

On October 7, 2012, Norton teamed with Keiji Mutoh to defeat the team of Masanobu Fuchi and Taiyo Kea in a tag team match on the first event of All Japan Pro Wrestling's 40th Anniversary Tour.

Norton returned to NJPW on January 4, 2017, at Wrestle Kingdom 11 in Tokyo Dome, taking part in the New Japan Rumble, from which he was eliminated by Michael Elgin. The following day, Norton teamed with Cheeseburger and former nWo Japan stablemates Hiro Saito, Hiroyoshi Tenzan and Satoshi Kojima in a ten-man tag team, where they defeated Bullet Club (Bad Luck Fale, Bone Soldier, Kenny Omega, Tama Tonga and Tanga Loa).

On April 29, 2017, Norton faced NYWC Heavyweight Champion Bull James at April Reign in a losing effort.

On April 5, 2022, Norton was announced on NJPW's official X account, that he would be joining The Good Brothers (Karl Anderson and Luke Gallows), Hikuleo, El Phantasmo and Chris Bey as an official member of Bullet Club for one night only in a 12-man Tag Team Match vs United Empire's Great-O-Khan, Jeff Cobb, TJP, Aaron Henare and Aussie Open (Kyle Fletcher and Mark Davis) at Windy City Riot on April 16, which resulted in a losing effort.

== Personal life ==
Norton is married to his wife Tammy. His book, Scott Norton: Strong Style, with assistance from Adam Randis, who has been a longtime fan of Norton, was released on May 25, 2019.

Growing up in Minnesota, Norton became friends with a number of future fellow professional wrestlers, including Road Warrior Hawk, Curt Hennig, Rick Rude, John Nord and Wayne Bloom.

== Championships and accomplishments ==
- New Japan Pro-Wrestling
  - IWGP Heavyweight Championship (2 times)
  - IWGP Tag Team Championship (2 times) – with Tony Halme (1) and Hercules Hernandez (1)
  - G1 Tag League (1999) – with Keiji Mutoh
  - Super Grade Tag League (1996) – with Shinya Hashimoto
  - Greatest Gaijin MVP (2002)
- Oregon Pro Wrestling Federation
  - OPWF Heavyweight Championship (1 time)
- Pacific Northwest Wrestling
  - NWA Pacific Northwest Heavyweight Championship (1 time)
- Pro Wrestling Illustrated
  - Ranked No. 47 of the 500 top wrestlers in the PWI 500 in 1993
- Western Alliance Entertainment
  - WAE Heavyweight Championship (1 time)
- Wrestling Observer Newsletter
  - Best Gimmick (1996) – nWo
  - Feud of the Year (1996) New World Order vs. World Championship Wrestling
