= Jurassic Powers =

Professional wrestling tag team

Tag team
- Members: Scott Norton; Hercules Hernandez
- Name(s): Jurassic Powers
- Billed heights: 6 ft 3 in (1.91 m) (Norton); 6 ft 1 in (1.85 m) (Hernandez)
- Combined billed weight: 630 lb (290 kg)
- Debut: 1993
- Disbanded: 1994

The Jurassic Powers was a professional wrestling tag team that competed in New Japan Pro-Wrestling. The team consisted of Scott Norton and Hercules Hernandez.

== History ==
The Jurassic Powers first formed in March 1993 when Hercules joined New Japan. The two spent the first few months in the midcard as they took part in six- and eight-man tag team matches. Eventually they began to climb the rankings and they defeated The Hellraisers on August 5, 1993 to win the IWGP Tag Team Championship.

After winning the title, the Jurassic Powers would hold them for 5 months and make 3 successful title defenses against the Hellraisers, Hiroshi Hase and Keiji Mutoh, and The Nasty Boys, as well as non-title victories over The Japanese Jolly Jacks and Brutus Beefcake and Jake Roberts. The team also entered the 1993 Super Grade Tag League and would ultimately be the runners-up as they lost to Hase and Mutoh in the finals.

The team would finally lose the title back to the Hellraisers at Battlefield on January 4, 1994. After the title loss, the Jurassic Powers would make few appearances as a team, eventually making their last appearance as a team in a losing effort against The Steiner Brothers on August 4, 1994. After that loss, they split up as Hernandez left New Japan.

== Championships and accomplishments ==
- New Japan Pro-Wrestling
  - IWGP Tag Team Championship (1 time)
