= Marty Jannetty =

American professional wrestler (born 1960)

- Jannetty in 2004

Personal information
- Born: Fredrick Martin Jannetty; February 3, 1960 (age 66) Columbus, Georgia, U.S.
- Spouse: Addie Galapon (m. 2024)

Professional wrestling career
- Ring name(s): Marty Jannetty; Marty Oates; Marty Scoot McFadden
- Billed height: 5 ft 11 in (1.80 m)
- Billed weight: 234 lb (106 kg)
- Billed from: Columbus, Georgia; Atlanta, Georgia (NWA SECW/CSW); Orlando, Florida (ECW/SMW); Tampa, Florida (XWF)
- Trained by: Jerry Oates; Ted Oates
- Debut: September 28, 1983
- Retired: June 16, 2018

Fredrick Martin Jannetty (born February 3, 1960) is an American retired professional wrestler who has worked for promotions including the American Wrestling Association (AWA), the World Wrestling Federation (WWF), World Championship Wrestling (WCW), and Extreme Championship Wrestling (ECW).

Jannetty is widely known for his tenure as one-half of tag team the Rockers alongside Shawn Michaels. The duo originally found success during the mid-to-late 1980s under the moniker of the Midnight Rockers, becoming two-time AWA World Tag Team Champions. They became one of the foremost teams of the WWF's Golden Age, headlining multiple events. The Rockers held the WWF World Tag Team Championship in late 1990, but their reign was voided.

After splitting from Michaels in early 1992, Jannetty became a one-time WWF Intercontinental Champion and a one-time WWF World Tag Team Champion with the 1-2-3 Kid. He competed in multiple world championship matches between ECW and the WWF from 1995–1996, but Jannetty's star faded thereafter, and he was largely used as enhancement talent during a late 1990s run in WCW. He made sporadic appearances for WWE during the latter half of the 2000s (including a brief 2005 reunion with Michaels), and competed on the independent circuit until retiring in 2016.

Although his career was continually halted by personal issues and his achievements overshadowed by those of Michaels, Jannetty was described by Talksport as being "as smooth and jaw-dropping as his partner, with a drop-kick to rival any".

== Early life ==
Jannetty was an amateur wrestler in the state of Georgia, qualifying for the state championship tournament his last three years of high school. He also boxed while in high school, and won many Golden Gloves events. After high school, he wrestled at Chattahoochee Valley Community College in Alabama where he was a two time NJCAA qualifier.

He then went to Auburn University to wrestle, but the school dropped its wrestling program. He thought about trying football, but was instead coaxed into professional wrestling by Jerry Oates, who trained him.

== Professional wrestling career ==
=== Early career (1983–1984) ===
Jannetty began his wrestling career in September 1983 for Mid-South Wrestling teaming with trainer Jerry Oates (as "cousin" Marty Oates), until November. After leaving Mid-South, he would wrestle under his real name for Southeastern Championship Wrestling, where he would wrestle the likes of Super Olympia and Mr. Olympia.

=== Central States Wrestling (1984–1986) ===
In March 1984, Jannetty began wrestling for the National Wrestling Alliance affiliate Central States Wrestling. He wrestled in singles and tag team competition with various partners, including Bulldog Bob Brown, Dave Peterson and Tommy Rogers (as the Uptown Boys).

In late 1985, Jannetty joined forces with fellow rookie Shawn Michaels. The two teamed as the Midnight Rockers and quickly won the NWA Central States Tag Team Championship from the Batten Twins. Jannetty wrestled Ric Flair for the NWA World Heavyweight Championship during his time in CSW.

=== All Japan Pro Wrestling (1985) ===
In the summer of 1985, Jannetty wrestled his first Japanese tour for All Japan Pro Wrestling, where his biggest match there was a loss to Tiger Mask II on September 5.

=== American Wrestling Association (1986–1988) ===
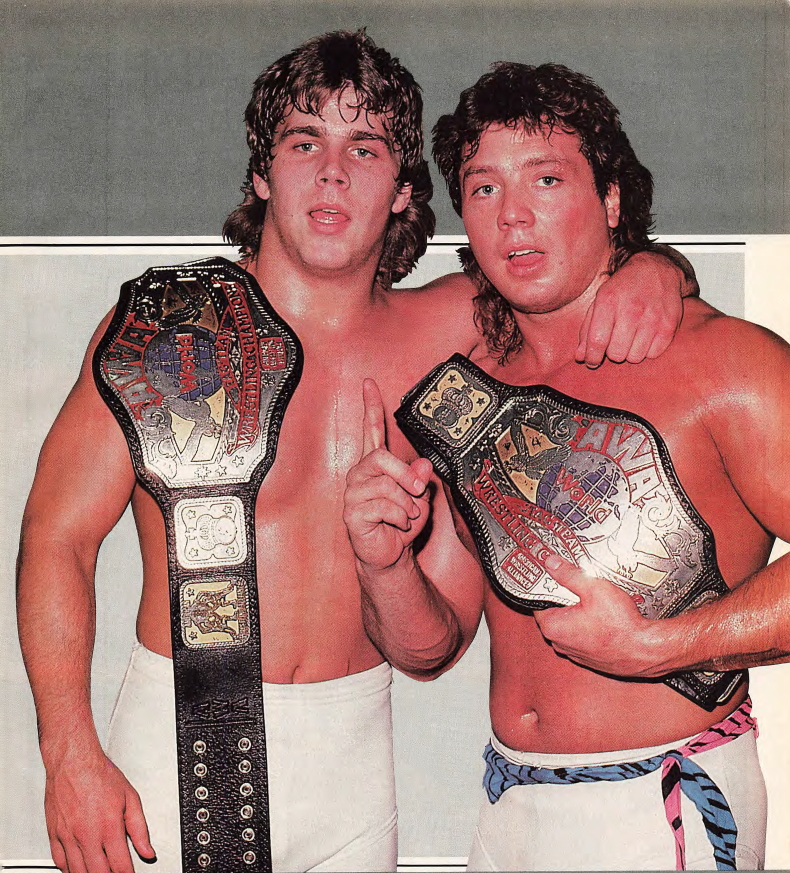
Shawn Michaels (left) with Marty Jannetty, known together as "the Midnight Rockers" during their time as AWA World Tag Team Champions

In 1986, the duo left CSW for the American Wrestling Association. In the AWA, Jannetty and Michaels quickly built a reputation as a talented tag team, performing many acrobatic moves in tandem and electrifying crowds with their athleticism. The two won the AWA World Tag Team Championship twice, first defeating Buddy Rose and Doug Somers and then The Midnight Express for their second and final reign. They also won the Southern Tag Team Championship twice after defeating the Rock 'n' Roll RPMs on two separate occasions before jumping to the World Wrestling Federation in 1988.

=== World Wrestling Federation (1988–1992) ===
==== The Rockers (1988–1991) ====
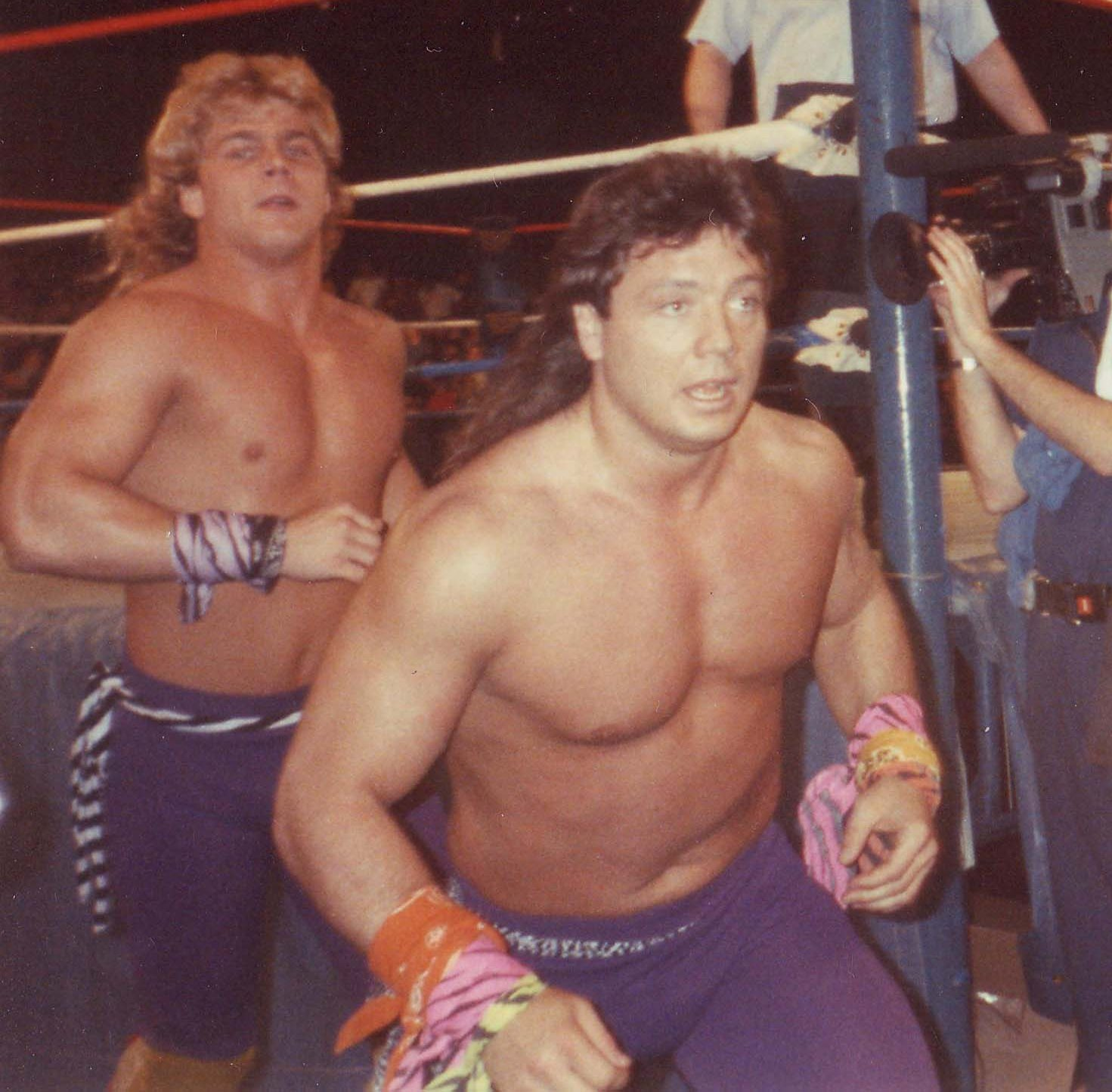
Jannetty (right) during his time in The Rockers with Shawn Michaels in WWF

Now called simply the Rockers, Jannetty and Michaels' popularity carried over from their stint in the AWA and the team was often called "tag team specialists" by commentator Gorilla Monsoon. They made their WWF debut at a television taping on June 18, 1988, and they faced tag teams such as Demolition, The Hart Foundation, and the Brain Busters for the rest of 1989. Duos including The Rockers routinely headlined house show events during this era of tag team wrestling.

Despite their previous success, The Rockers never officially won the Tag Team Championship during their three-year run together in the WWF. On October 30, 1990, The Rockers were scheduled to win the titles from The Hart Foundation due to Jim Neidhart, one-half of the championship team, being in the process of negotiating his release from the company. The match was taped with The Rockers fairly winning the belts, but soon after, Neidhart reportedly came to a stop-gap agreement with management and was rehired. On the other hand, Michaels claimed in his book that the Hart Foundation lobbied backstage to keep the title. The belts were returned to the Hart Foundation a week later, and despite The Rockers making a title defense against Power and Glory on November 3, the change was never broadcast or acknowledged on television.

During a tag team match at the USF Sun Dome in December 1990, Jannetty executed his Rocker Dropper finishing move on Chuck Austin, who was teaming with The Genius. Austin's neck was instantly broken as a result of tucking his head during the move, rather than falling flat on the mat. Austin was paralyzed and sued Jannetty, Michaels, and Titan Sports. When the case finally came to court in early 1994, Austin was awarded $26.7 million. Titan Sports appealed the decision and came to a $10 million settlement. In the end, Jannetty was ordered to pay Austin $500,000.

==== Feud with Shawn Michaels (1991–1992) ====
In a 1991 angle to begin the breakup of the team, Michaels was accidentally kicked in the face during a maneuver initiated by Jannetty on one of The Nasty Boys, which clipped Shawn in the face and resulted in an elimination at Survivor Series. Michaels got up after being pinned and began screaming at Jannetty, blaming him for being eliminated.

After weeks of tension, the team was granted a WWF World Tag Team Championship match against The Legion of Doom on the December 28, 1991 edition of WWF Superstars. The Rockers were unsuccessful following another miscommunication. Michaels launched Jannetty into Animal for a double-team move where Michaels would dropkick Jannetty's back, knocking him on top of Animal. Instead, Animal turned at the last second and Michaels dropkicked him. Animal fell on top of Jannetty and got the 3-count. Following the match, Michaels was irate at Jannetty for getting pinned while Jannetty tried to calm him down. After pushing away an attempted hug by Jannetty, Michaels slapped Jannetty in the face. Jannetty refused to fight back. Michaels slapped Jannetty again, causing Jannetty to lunge at Michaels but stopped short of attacking him and stormed out the ring. Michaels took his wristbands off and stared at the booing crowd.

Attempting to help settle their differences, Brutus Beefcake invited both on his interview segment "The Barber Shop" on the January 12, 1992 episode of WWF Wrestling Challenge. Michaels and Jannetty appeared to reconcile, but then Michaels turned heel, hitting Jannetty with "Sweet Chin Music". He then picked up Jannetty and tossed him through the big Barber Shop glass window, causing him to bleed profusely. Jannetty was initially meant to work the injury, thus missing the opportunity to win the vacant WWF Championship at the 1992 Royal Rumble. He was scheduled to return shortly after to start a feud which was to lead to a one-on-one match between Michaels and Jannetty at WrestleMania VIII.

However, in the early hours of January 25, 1992, Jannetty was arrested in Tampa, Florida, after an altercation with police. His female companion, a 19-year-old named Angela Ialacci, was arrested for trying to use a fake ID. Jannetty assaulted the officer performing the arrest, which led to his arrest. They were found to be in possession of less than a gram of cocaine. Jannetty was charged with possession of cocaine, possession of drug paraphernalia, and resisting arrest with force. He was indefinitely suspended by the WWF following the incident and his singles matches that were taped in January did not air. In March 1992, he was sentenced to 6 months of house arrest and was released by the WWF shortly after. Michaels ended up facing El Matador in the opening match of WrestleMania VIII with no significant storyline other than Michaels being upset that El Matador eliminated him from the Royal Rumble.

=== United States Wrestling Association (1992) ===
After first leaving the WWF in 1992 and awaiting sentencing for his arrest, Jannetty joined the USWA as a heel. During his stay, he was managed by Bert Prentice and feuded with Jerry Lawler.

=== World Wrestling Federation (1992–1994) ===
==== Intercontinental Champion (1992–1993) ====
Shortly after his house arrest concluded, Jannetty re-signed with the WWF and returned on October 12, 1992 at a TV taping in Saskatoon, Saskatchewan from the crowd, attempting to strike Michaels with his mirror but inadvertently hitting Sensational Sherri, Michaels's then-manager, when Michaels pulled her in front. A few weeks later, he challenged Michaels to a match at the 1993 Royal Rumble for the Intercontinental Championship. The match had a secondary storyline, promoting the return of Sensational Sherri from her injuries and speculating whose corner Sherri would be in. During the match, Michaels rolled outside the ring looking to Sherri for comfort. Sherri slapped Michaels, turning babyface and aligning with Jannetty. Jannetty lost after interference by Sherri backfired. After the match, Sherri was being interviewed backstage when Michaels confronted her. Jannetty attacked Michaels during the confrontation. They had to be separated by referees and officials, indicating that their feud would continue and perhaps lead to a rematch at WrestleMania IX. But Jannetty was released again after rumors circulated stating that he had been under the influence of alcohol or other drugs during the match, leading to its comparably low quality. Michaels was then suddenly shifted into a feud with Tatanka. Jannetty to this day denies having been intoxicated at the event, but explains having been rather tired because of lack of sleep, and that the rumor had been started by Shawn Michaels to escape blame for the match being disappointing.

Jannetty returned once again on May 17, 1993, challenging Michaels for the Intercontinental Championship after appearing out of the crowd on Monday Night RAW when Michaels was being interviewed by Vince McMahon and telling the audience that he would defend his title against anyone at any time. Though Michaels initially tried to back out of fighting Jannetty (clearly not expecting anyone, least of all Jannetty, to challenge him that night), he eventually put his title on the line against his former partner. Jannetty won the title that night, thanks to Mr. Perfect preventing Michaels from heading to the locker room where he would be counted out but keep his title. Jannetty had only one title defense on TV, defeating Bam Bam Bigelow by countout on the May 31, 1993 edition of Monday Night RAW. He lost the title back to Michaels on June 6, 1993 in a non-televised match in Albany, New York due to interference from Michaels' debuting bodyguard Diesel. The title change was never shown on television and to this day no footage has ever surfaced.

According to Jannetty, it was Curt Hennig who petitioned to bring him back to the WWF. Hennig, who was on good terms with Vince McMahon, convinced Vince that Michaels also deserved some responsibility for the poor Rumble '93 match. Jannetty believes that his title victory was meant as punishment for Shawn Michaels for lying.

After losing the championship back to Michaels, Jannetty feuded with Doink the Clown, eventually winning the program with a final best of three falls match on the June 21, 1993 edition of Monday Night Raw where Doink almost won the match 2 falls to 1 after Doink II interfered in the match. Randy Savage (who was commentating the match), attacked the first Doink and revealed the second to the referee, making Jannetty win by reversed decision.

At SummerSlam '93, Jannetty lost to the recently debuted Ludvig Borga in Borga's first televised contest against a major talent. Borga had previously only faced jobbers on television.

==== Teaming with 1-2-3 Kid (1993–1994) ====
Jannetty then formed a tag team with the 1-2-3 Kid, with the two being the winners and survivors of their match at Survivor Series.

Jannetty won the Tag Team Championship with the 1-2-3 Kid from The Quebecers (Jacques and Pierre) on the January 10, 1994 episode of Monday Night Raw. They lost the title to The Quebecers seven days later at Madison Square Garden on January 17, 1994 at a non-televised event when 1-2-3 Kid was pinned following an assisted senton. A clip of the finish of the match aired on the 1994 Royal Rumble video.

In the lead up to WrestleMania X, the court case brought forward by Charles Austin (a wrestler paralysed in-ring) was heard. While neither the WWF or Jannetty admitted that it was the outcome of this case which resulted in Jannetty's sudden disappearance from the promotion, it has never been denied either. Jannetty then vanished from the mainstream wrestling scene until early 1995 when he made several appearances in Extreme Championship Wrestling.

=== Independent circuit (1994–1995) ===
In September 1994, Jannetty took part in a European tour for World Wrestling Superstars. Upon his return to the States, he steadily worked the independent circuit. By February 1995, he was balancing his independent dates with bookings from Extreme Championship Wrestling. In May 1995, he defeated Bruiser Bedlam to win the MTW Heavyweight Championship, during his time in Midwest Territorial Wrestling. He would hold onto the title until August, when he lost it to Al Snow at Smoky Mountain Wrestling's Super Bowl of Wrestling.

=== Extreme Championship Wrestling (1995) ===
Jannetty debuted for ECW on February 25 at the ECW show Return of the Funker where he challenged ECW World Heavyweight Champion Shane Douglas in a losing effort. A few months later on April 28, Jannetty defeated Jim Neidhart and the next night he defeated Shane Douglas. On May 13 at Enter the Sandman Jannetty challenged Eddie Guerrero for the ECW World Television Championship but failed to win the title. On July 20 Jannetty defeated Bull Pain, the next night on July 21, Jannetty defeated The Terrorist. On June 9 and July 22, Jannetty unsuccessfully challenged The Sandman for the ECW World Heavyweight Championship. On July 28 Jannetty faced Jim Neidhart with the match ending in a double disqualification. This turned out to be Jannetty's final match in ECW as he left for the WWF again.

=== World Wrestling Federation (1995–1996) ===
==== Partnership with Razor Ramon (1995) ====
Later that year, just months after Michaels made a face turn, Jannetty returned to the WWF in September 1995, defeating Skip on Monday Nght Raw. Later he defeated Duke Droese, Rad Radford, and Brooklyn Brawler in singles matches. At In Your House 4, Jannetty lost to the debuting Goldust. He continued to wrestle as a face. He and Michaels were kept away from each other in matches and storylines. Jannetty formed an alliance with Razor Ramon during the final two months of the year to help with his ongoing issues with "Million Dollar Man" Ted DiBiase, Sycho Sid, and the now heel 1-2-3 Kid. At the In Your House 5 in December 1995, Jannetty and Razor defeated Sid and 1-2-3 Kid in a tag team match.

==== The New Rockers (1996) ====
Following an unsuccessful bid to win the 1996 Royal Rumble, Jannetty turned heel in February 1996 to form the New Rockers with Leif Cassidy. The team's first match was a first-round contest in a tournament for the vacant WWF World Tag Team Championship; they were defeated in the first round by the Godwinns.

Jannetty interfered unsuccessfully in a singles match between Michaels and Cassidy that March, then lost to Michaels in a WWF Championship match at the Kuwait Cup in May, as well as in a non-title match on Raw that July.

The tandem made their pay-per-view debut at SummerSlam 1996, failing to win the Tag Team Championship during a four-way tag team match with the Smoking Gunns winning the bout and retaining the titles. The match also featured the Godwinns and the Bodydonnas.

Their next (and final) pay-per-view appearance came at Survivor Series 1996, when they teamed with Owen Hart and the British Bulldog to face Doug Furnas and Phil LaFon and the Godwinns in an elimination match. Cassidy began a character change at this event, going from goofy and nerdy to walking slowly with a permanent scowl on his face. He also now had a Horseshoe moustache. Jannetty did not play off Cassidy's attitude change. Jannetty was the first participant eliminated. It was during this match that Jannetty injured his ankle.

Jannetty asked for his release from the company after the show, as he was unhappy with the team's lack of success and management's refusal to split them up. His last match came when they were defeated by Pierroth and Cibernetico in a match that aired on the December 23, 1996 episode of RAW. Jannetty and Cassidy shoved each other and argued after the loss, but it was ignored by the commentators.

=== Independent circuit (1997) ===
Jannetty (seated) with Falcon Coperis in Ultimate Championship Wrestling in 1997

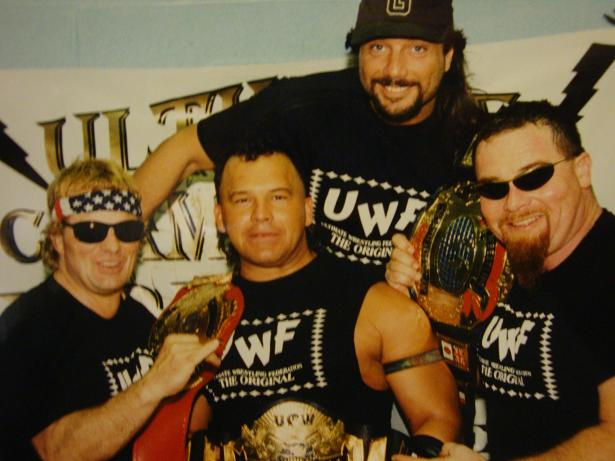
Jannetty (top) with Bruce Hart, Tatanka and Jim Neidhart in 1997

After his run with the World Wrestling Federation, Jannetty joined the New York-based independent promotion Ultimate Championship Wrestling in 1997 along with other WWF alumni. He also made an appearance in ECW when he teamed with Vampire Warrior in a losing match against Roadkill and former partner Al Snow at a house show in Orlando, FL on September 27, 1997.

=== World Championship Wrestling (1998) ===
As part of an effort to enhance WCW's roster as Thunder was introduced into the weekly lineup, World Championship Wrestling signed several former WWF wrestlers including Jannetty. He made his debut on the January 12, 1998 edition of WCW Monday Nitro, defeating Black Cat. A week later on Nitro, he was defeated by Chris Benoit. Much as Al Snow's run in the WWF in 1997, Jannetty was initially utilized at an enhancement level, falling to wrestlers such as Raven, Dean Malenko, and Chris Jericho. He was successful against lower level competition, defeating Lenny Lane, Frankie Lancaster, and Horshu.

In April 1998 he had his first substantial winning streak in WCW, defeating Barry Horowitz and Vincent. In May he began a house show series with Konnan. In July he wrestled Konnan in another series of house show matches, and his final match came on August 31 when he lost to Konnan on Nitro. Jannetty was released from his contract while recovering from a shoulder injury suffered during this match.

=== Independent circuit (1999–2001, 2003–2005) ===
Jannetty made his first appearance following this injury on May 8, 1999, facing IPW Heavyweight Champion Cuban Assassin. In the summer of 1999 he embarked on a tour of Australia for the Australasian Wrestling Federation (AWF), facing Sabu, Chris Candido, and TNT. On October 10, 1999 he teamed with Tommy Rogers against the Samoan SWAT Team on the Heroes of Wrestling PPV. After wrestling one match in ECW in 2000, Jannetty resumed working in independent promotions, including a stint in Jimmy Hart's XWF promotion. In 2001, he decided to take a hiatus from wrestling. He returned to wrestling in 2003.

=== WWE (2005–2009) ===
Jannetty in 2005

On the March 14, 2005 episode of Raw, Jannetty returned to the now-renamed World Wrestling Entertainment (WWE) for a one-night reunion with his former tag team partner Shawn Michaels, once again billed as the Rockers and performing their traditional entrance with their original music, against La Résistance. Jannetty scored the win for his team after he used his signature Rocker Dropper. This was preparation for Jannetty's match with Kurt Angle on that week's SmackDown!, as Angle had challenged Jannetty prior to his WrestleMania 21 match with Shawn Michaels. Angle claimed that since Jannetty had taught Michaels "everything he knows" while part of the Rockers, he could teach Michaels "how to tap out" by forcing Jannetty to submit on SmackDown!. Angle made good on his promise and forced Jannetty to submit to his ankle lock, but only after a nearly twenty-minute match and an impressive showing for Jannetty which saw him nearly pin Angle. WWE subsequently signed him to a new contract, however he was arrested and unable to meet the commitments of his WWE contract, leading to his release on July 6.

On the February 20, 2006 episode of Raw, Shawn Michaels was pitted against four of the five members of the Spirit Squad in their in-ring debut. After he had used Sweet Chin Music, Michaels was attacked by all five members until an unknown man came storming in to the ring to defend Michaels. During the melee, it was revealed that it was Jannetty coming to defend his former tag team partner. Later on Raw, Vince McMahon came out to mention that he would offer Jannetty a full-time contract. McMahon then added a stipulation that Jannetty had to join Mr. McMahon's "Kiss My Ass Club" the following week on Raw. Jannetty refused, and McMahon instead offered Jannetty the possibility of breaking Chris Masters' signature submission hold, the Master Lock. Jannetty appeared to almost break the hold, but Mr. McMahon (who was officiating) hit Jannetty with a low blow. Unable to break it, he was only released from the hold when Michaels ran in to save him. Shortly after Michaels had saved Jannetty, Shane McMahon ran in the ring with a steel chair and knocked out Michaels. The former Rockers were supposed to continue a program with the McMahons, but Jannetty was absent from the next episode of Raw and instead Triple H and Shawn Michaels reunited as D-Generation X. On March 3, WWE announced that it had severed all professional ties with Jannetty without further explanation.

On September 15, 2006, it was announced on WWE.com that Jannetty had signed a new contract and would be returning as a veteran to work with younger talent. WWE.com also stated that Jannetty, along with Brad Armstrong and Rodney Mack, could also be granted a full-time contract pending the success of this initial venture. According to Wrestling Observer Newsletter, Jannetty was rumored to have been released yet again on September 29. Jannetty countered this rumor on his Myspace page, stating it was untrue. In a blog on his website, Jim Ross said Jannetty was no longer with WWE on December 24 due to a court order in Florida preventing him from traveling on the road.

On the December 3, 2007 episode of Raw, Mr. Kennedy, who was feuding with Shawn Michaels at the time, said that he would speak to three people who knew Michaels very well as part of a feud between him and Michaels. The three were imposters dressed as Razor Ramon, Diesel, and Jannetty. Along with a fake Michaels, they were all attacked with Sweet Chin Music by the real Michaels. The next week, on the 15th anniversary of Raw, Jannetty appeared along with Michaels in an interview. Michaels wanted to see what would happen when Kennedy fought the real Jannetty. In the end, Jannetty was defeated by Kennedy.

On October 19, 2009, Jannetty, made an appearance on Raw, losing to The Miz.

=== Late career (2009–2018) ===
On October 22, 2011, it was announced that Jannetty had signed with Chikara as a trainer and as a wrestler. His debut match for the promotion was booked for October 29 against Tursas, but the show was eventually cancelled. He then made his official debut on November 13 at High Noon, Chikara's inaugural internet pay-per-view, by accompanying The Young Bucks (Matt and Nick Jackson) to the ring. Jannetty made his Chikara in-ring debut on August 12, 2012, when he teamed with Green Ant in a tag team match, where they were defeated by Los Ice Creams (El Hijo del Ice Cream and Ice Cream, Jr.). Jannetty returned on September 16, 2012, when he and the 1-2-3 Kid won the annual tag team gauntlet match at the 2012 King of Trios. When Jannetty and the 1-2-3 Kid also defeated the Heart Throbs (Antonio Thomas and Romeo Roselli) on November 18, they earned their third point, or third back-to-back win, and a future shot at the Chikara Campeonatos de Parejas. Jannetty and the 1-2-3 Kid received their title shot on December 2 at the Under the Hood internet pay-per-view, where they were defeated by the defending champions, The Young Bucks.

Jannetty wrestled his final match on June 16, 2018 for the Ohio-based Battle on the Border promotion, participating in an eight-man elimination tag team match, where he was the team captain, defeating Eddie Gonzales and his team. In a 2023 interview with Bill Apter, Jannetty revealed that after undergoing two ankle surgeries, he did not want to return to the ring to risk damaging his reconstructed ankles.

== Personal life ==
In July 2016, Jannetty was named part of a class action lawsuit filed against the WWE which alleged that wrestlers incurred traumatic brain injuries during their tenure and that the company concealed the risks of injury. The suit was litigated by attorney Konstantine Kyros, who has been involved in a number of other lawsuits against the WWE. The lawsuit was dismissed by US District Judge Vanessa Lynne Bryant in September 2018. Bryant was critical of Kyros for including irrelevant information in the lawsuit, including details about Jannetty's broken ankle, which she said had wasted the court's time. On January 31, 2024, Jannetty reported that his ankle issues may lead to his leg being amputated. In May 2026, Jannetty had a foot amputated.

In the early morning hours of August 5, 2020, Jannetty made a Facebook post in which he said he made a man "disappear" when he was 13. Police in Columbus, Georgia confirmed that they would investigate the post. Jannetty later clarified that he did not kill the man, but he hit him in the head with a brick after an attempted sexual assault and "made [him] disappear". The following month, Jannetty said that his comments were part of a wrestling storyline, which he had to drop because of the police investigation.

== Championships and accomplishments ==
- American Wrestling Association
  - AWA World Tag Team Championship (2 times) – with Shawn Michaels
- Central States Wrestling
  - NWA Central States Heavyweight Championship (2 times)
  - NWA Central States Tag Team Championship (5 times) – with Tommy Rogers (2), Bob Brown (2) and Shawn Michaels (1)
  - NWA Central States Television Championship (1 time)
- Continental Wrestling Association
  - AWA Southern Tag Team Championship (2 times) – with Shawn Michaels
- Deutsche Wrestling Allianz
  - DWA World Heavyweight Championship (1 time)
- Dynamic Wrestling Alliance
  - DWA Internet Championship (1 time)
- Platinum Wrestling Worldwide
  - PWW Heavyweight Championship (1 time)
- Michigan Wrestling Alliance
  - MWA Heavyweight Championship (1 time)
- Midwest Territorial Wrestling
  - MTW Heavyweight Championship (1 time)
- New Age Wrestling
  - NAW Television Championship (1 time)
- Pro Wrestling Illustrated
  - Ranked No. 13 of the top 500 singles wrestlers in the PWI 500 in 1993
  - Ranked No. 194 of the Top 500 singles wrestlers of the "PWI Years" in 2003
  - Ranked No. 33 of the Top 100 Tag Teams of the "PWI Years" with Shawn Michaels in 2003
  - PWI Match of the Year (1993) vs. Shawn Michaels on Monday Night Raw on July 19
- UWA Elite Wrestling
  - UWA Elite iChampionship (1 time)
- World Wide Wrestling Alliance
  - WWWA Intercontinental Championship (1 time)
- World Wrestling Federation
  - WWF Intercontinental Championship (1 time)
  - WWF Tag Team Championship (1 time) – with the 1-2-3 Kid
- Wrestling Observer Newsletter
  - Tag Team of the Year (1989) with Shawn Michaels
