= Oliver Humperdink =

American wrestling manager

Personal information
- Born: John Jay Sutton; January 16, 1949 Minneapolis, Minnesota, U.S.
- Died: March 20, 2011 (aged 62) Minneapolis, Minnesota, U.S.

Professional wrestling career
- Ring name(s): Red Sutton; The Big Kahuna; Sir Oliver Humperdink; Rooster Humperdink; Big Daddy Dink
- Billed height: 5 ft 10 in (178 cm)
- Billed weight: 252 lb (114 kg)
- Debut: 1965 (Involved in business); 1973 (officially)
- Retired: 1995

John Jay Sutton (January 16, 1949 – March 20, 2011), better known by his ring name Oliver Humperdink, was an American professional wrestling manager and occasional wrestler who worked for Jim Crockett Promotions, Championship Wrestling from Florida, World Wrestling Federation and World Championship Wrestling.

== Early life ==
Sutton was born in Minneapolis, Minnesota in 1949. In the early and mid-1960s, John Sutton began to get to know several wrestlers while working as an usher at the Metropolitan Stadium. He eventually landed a job as a security guard for the American Wrestling Association (AWA).

== Career ==
In 1973, Sutton met Paul Vachon when he went to work at Grand Prix Wrestling (GPW) in Montreal. At GPW, Sutton worked as a manager and an occasional wrestler. He also refereed for a time. Sutton began managing the Hollywood Blonds after they split with their manager, Johnny Rougeau. Both Don Jardine and Dale Hey are credited with coming up with the name "Sir Oliver Humperdink". Jardine claims to have come up with the name, believing it would draw heat from francophone fans in Quebec who hated anything English.

In 1974, Humperdink went to Championship Wrestling from Florida and was put into an angle with Mike Graham and Kevin Sullivan. Two years later, he began working with the Hollywood Blondes once again. In 1980 Humperdink became Dusty Rhodes' servant for thirty days after his protege Ivan Koloff lost a match to Rhodes with that stipulation. During the thirty days, Lord Alfred Hayes began managing Humperdink's proteges such as Bobby Jaggers and Nikolai Volkoff. When "Rooster" Humperdink (as Rhodes had nicknamed him), who had become a figure of sympathy during his thirty days' servitude, returned to management and attempted to claim back Jaggers, Hayes and Volkoff brutally beat on him, thus starting a feud with Hayes.

He worked for the National Wrestling Alliance (NWA)'s Jim Crockett Promotions in the 1980s where he managed Greg Valentine, Paul Jones and The One Man Gang. He left the company in 1983 but returned five years later shortly before the company was bought out by Ted Turner and became World Championship Wrestling. While still in the NWA, he formed a stable known as the "House of Humperdink". As a singles wrestler, he held the NWA Florida Heavyweight Championship and NWA Central States Television Championship.

In 1987, the World Wrestling Federation (WWF) approached Humperdink and offered him a job. As a part of the WWF, he managed Bam Bam Bigelow. That same year, he also began managing Paul Orndorff during his feud with Rick Rude. His gimmick was that of a face, but Sutton did not like the gimmick off-screen. He managed the duo during the first-ever Survivor Series in a match that they lost when Bigelow was pinned by André the Giant. Humperdink also managed Bigelow during WrestleMania IV when he lost in the first round of a WWF Championship tournament.

Bigelow and Humperdink left the WWF in mid 1988 and stayed together on the independent circuit before together joining World Championship Wrestling in 1988. Humperdink was still at the side of Bigelow in his feud with Barry Windham in a match at Starrcade and later joined him in turning heel on Lex Luger in early 1989. After Bigelow left WCW, Humperdink managed The New Wild Samoans (Fatu, Samu, and The Samoan Savage), calling himself "The Big Kahuna".

He worked for World Championship Wrestling (WCW) in the early 1990s as "Big Daddy Dink", a biker-type gimmick. In WCW, he managed Fabulous Freebirds (Michael Hayes and Jimmy Garvin). Off-screen, Sutton hated his new gimmick and WCW's office politics. He retired in 1993. In 1995 he returned to manage Bob Orton Jr. and The Hangmen in the American Wrestling Federation.

== Personal life ==
Sutton never married or had children.

In the 1960s, Sutton was in a car crash and nearly died when he hit a snow bank. After recovering from the incident, his health deteriorated.

In 2001, he went through surgery to replace his aortic valve in Key West. He was equipped with a pacemaker and made a full recovery. The Cauliflower Alley Club, whose conventions he attended every year, helped pay for some of his medical expenses. Sutton returned to the hospital in 2008 after heart troubles complicated a case of pneumonia.

=== Illness and death ===
In early 2011, it was announced that Sutton was diagnosed with cancer of the bladder. He entered a hospice having refused chemotherapy and radiotherapy. Sutton died early on the morning of March 20, 2011, of complications from pneumonia and cancer at the age of 62.

== Championships and accomplishments ==
- Cauliflower Alley Club
  - Other honoree (2005)
- Central States Wrestling
  - NWA Central States Television Championship (1 time)
- Championship Wrestling from Florida
  - NWA Florida Heavyweight Championship (1 time)
- Pro Wrestling Illustrated
  - Manager of the Year (1980)
