= Gary Royal =

American professional wrestler

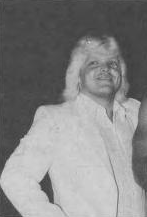
- Rowell, c. 1983

Personal information
- Born: Gary Rowell China Grove, North Carolina, U.S.

Professional wrestling career
- Ring name(s): Gorgeous Gary; Cruel Connection #1; Super Destroyer; Gladiator #1
- Billed height: 1.80 m (5 ft 11 in)
- Billed weight: 100 kg (220 lb)
- Debut: Dec 14th 1979 Pittsboro, NC
- Retired: 2012

Gary Rowell, known as "Gorgeous" Gary Royal, is an American professional wrestler. In the early part of his career, he was a member of the Convertible Blonds, a heel stable working for the Poffo family Rip Rogers and Ricky Starr when Starr left he was replaced by Pistol Pez Whatley. He also teamed with George South as the masked Gladiators.

== Championships and accomplishments ==
- Central States Wrestling
  - NWA Central States Television Championship (1 time)
- National Wrestling Alliance
  - NWA World Junior Heavyweight Championship (1 time)
- Pro Wrestling Federation
  - PWF Intercontinental Championship (1 time)
  - PWF Junior Heavyweight Championship (1 time)
  - PWF Tag Team Champion (3 times) – with Flaming Youth (2) and Cruel Connection II
- Southern Championship Wrestling
  - SCW Heavyweight Championship (1 time)
- Other titles
  - CCW Heavyweight Championship (1 time)
