= King Cobra (wrestler) =

American wrestler

Personal information
- Born: Jimmy Kimble; March 14, 1948 (age 78) South Carolina, United States

Professional wrestling career
- Ring name: King Cobra
- Billed height: 6 ft 1 in (185 cm)
- Billed weight: 231 lb (105 kg)
- Trained by: Al Galento
- Debut: 1971
- Retired: 2024

James (Jimmy) Kimble (March 14, 1948) is a retired American professional wrestler, better known by his ring name, King Cobra well known in Tennessee during the late 1970s, 1980s and 1990s.

== Professional wrestling career ==
King Cobra made his wrestling debut in 1971. In 1977, he made his debut for the newly Continental Wrestling Association based in Memphis where he was a household name until the promotion folded in 1989.

He also worked for Mid-South Wrestling from 1979 to 1983. In 1981, he worked a few matches for the WWF. Later on worked in Florida, Georgia, Kansas City and Texas.

King Cobra won the NWA Mid-America Heavyweight Championship (Memphis version) defeating Bobby Eaton in 1982. He dropped the title to Dutch Mantel.

In 1985, King Cobra made his only tour to Japan working on joint shows with All Japan Pro Wrestling and Japan Pro Wrestling.

In October 1989, Cobra made an appearance in World Championship Wrestling losing to Lex Luger.

In 1989 Memphis got a new promotion United States Wrestling Association where he worked until he promotion folded in November 1997. On December 30, 1989, he won the USWA Unified World Heavyweight Championship defeating Jerry Lawler. He dropped the title back to Lawler in January 1990.

After USWA folded, Cobra worked for Power Pro Wrestling in 1998. Later in his career he worked in the independent circuit in Tennessee and Memphis Wrestling from 2003 to his retirement in 2009. He continued to manager wrestlers on independent shows over the years.

On May 5, 2024, King Cobra returned for a match at 76 years old when he teamed with Michael as they defeated the Hollywood Clique (Jimmy Blaylock and Van Vicious) at Championship Wrestling From Memphis in Memphis, Tennessee.

== Personal life ==
Other than wrestling, Kimble worked for Republic Services, a welding job for 55 years from 1965 to 2020. He only took one sick day when he injured his leg in a wrestling match in Alabama in 1985.

Kimble also ran a side business building and selling ornamental iron security doors and window guards.

== Championships and accomplishments ==
- International Championship Wrestling(Mississippi)
  - ICW Mississippi Heavyweight Championship(1 time)
  - ICW Southern Tag Team Championship(1 time)-with Porkchop Cash
- NWA Mid-America
  - NWA MId-America Heavyweight Championship (Memphis version) ( 1 time )
- United States Wrestling Association
  - USWA Unified World Heavyweight Championship (1 time)
- Pro Wrestling Illustrated
  - PWI ranked King Cobra # 217 of the 500 best singles wrestlers of the PWI 500 in 1991
  - PWI ranked King Cobra # 413 of the 500 best singles wrestlers of the PWI 500 in 1992
