= King of the Ring (2019) =

Professional wrestling tournament by WWE

- Promotional poster featuring the tournament participants
- Promotion: WWE
- Brand(s): Raw; SmackDown
- Date: August 19 – September 16, 2019
- City: See Locations
- Venue: See Locations

King of the Ring tournament chronology
← Previous; 2015	Next → 2021

King of the Ring (2019)
Tournament information
- Sport: Professional wrestling
- Location: United States
- Dates: August 19, 2019–September 16, 2019
- Tournament format(s): Single elimination tournament
- Participants: 16

Final positions
- Champion: Baron Corbin
- Runner-up: Chad Gable

Tournament statistics
- Matches played: 15

The 2019 King of the Ring was the 21st edition of the King of the Ring tournament produced by WWE and was held for wrestlers from the Raw and SmackDown brand divisions. Tournament matches began on the August 19, 2019 episode of Raw and continued to be held across episodes of Raw and SmackDown over the next month. The tournament final was originally scheduled to be held at the Clash of Champions pay-per-view, but was rescheduled for the following night's Raw on September 16, 2019 at the Thompson-Boling Arena in Knoxville, Tennessee. It was the first King of the Ring tournament since 2015 and the first held since the brand extension was reinstated in 2016. The tournament featured 16 wrestlers, evenly divided into two brackets, one for Raw and the other for SmackDown, with the winners of each bracket facing each other in the final. The winner of the 2019 tournament was Baron Corbin from Raw, defeating SmackDown's Chad Gable in the final. Corbin subsequently became known as King Corbin and continued this persona until June 2021.

== Background ==
The King of the Ring tournament is a single-elimination tournament that was established by WWE in 1985 with the winner being crowned "King of the Ring." It was held annually until 1991, with the exception of 1990. These early tournaments were held as special non-televised house shows and were held when the promotion was still called the World Wrestling Federation (WWF, renamed to WWE in 2002). In 1993, the promotion began to produce the King of the Ring tournament as a self-titled pay-per-view (PPV). Unlike the previous non-televised events, the PPV did not feature all of the tournament's matches. Instead, several of the qualifying matches preceded the event with the final few match then taking place at the pay-per-view. There were also other matches that took place at the event as it was a traditional three-hour pay-per-view.

King of the Ring continued as the annual June PPV until the 2002 event, which was the final King of the Ring produced as a PPV. Following the conclusion of the PPV chronology, the tournament began to be held periodically every few years, first making its return in 2006, which was held exclusively for wrestlers from the SmackDown! brand—the 2008 and 2010 tournaments also featured wrestlers from WWE's other brands. In August 2011, the brand extension ended with both the Raw and SmackDown television shows featuring the full main roster, but in mid-2016, the brand split was reinstated. On the August 12, 2019 episode of Raw, it was announced that the King of the Ring tournament would be returning for the first time since 2015. Later that night, the competitors for the 21st King of the Ring tournament were confirmed; a few days later, the 16-man bracket was officially revealed, evenly divided between Raw and SmackDown. The tournament began on August 19 and occurred across episodes of Raw and SmackDown, with the winners of each brand's bracket facing off in the final. The final was originally scheduled to occur at the Clash of Champions PPV on September 15, 2019, but was rescheduled for the following night's Raw on September 16 in Knoxville, Tennessee at the Thompson-Boling Arena.

== Bracket ==
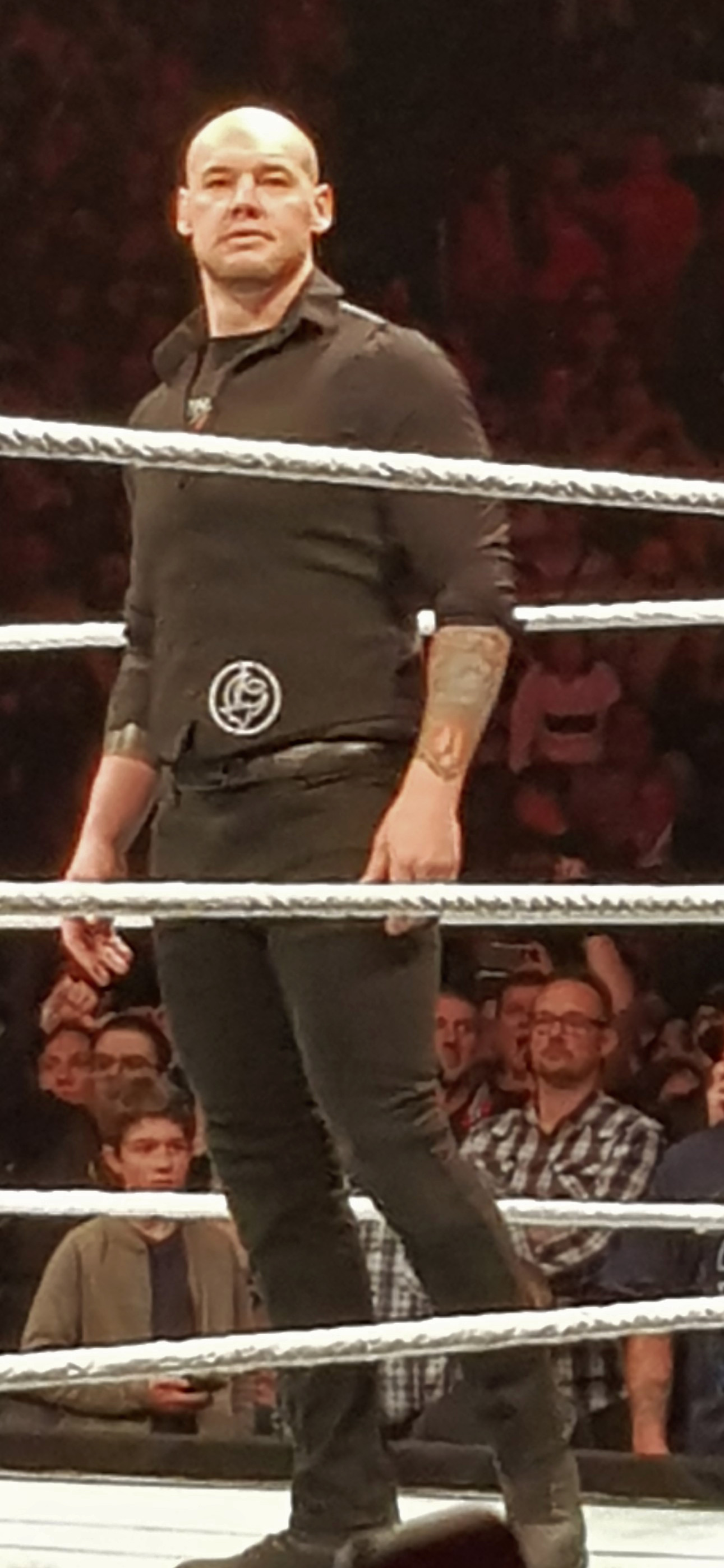
Baron Corbin, the winner of the 2019 King of the Ring tournament

First round Raw/SmackDown; 8/19/19, 8/20/19, 8/26/19, 8/27/19	Quarter-finals; Raw/SmackDown; 9/2/19, 9/3/19
Cesaro	10:00
Samoa Joe	Sub
Samoa Joe	Draw (Note: Match ended in a double pinfall with both men advancing to the semi-finals.)
Ricochet	16:00
Ricochet	Pin
Drew McIntyre	14:10
Raw
Cedric Alexander	Pin
Sami Zayn	3:35
Cedric Alexander	14:30
Baron Corbin	Pin
The Miz	10:00
Baron Corbin	Pin
Kevin Owens	13:25
Elias	Pin (Note: Shane McMahon made himself special guest referee during the match.)
Elias	Pin
Ali	11:30
Ali	Pin
Buddy Murphy	11:32
SmackDown
Chad Gable	Pin
Shelton Benjamin	3:52
Chad Gable	Pin
Andrade	7:55
Apollo Crews	9:40
Andrade	Pin

Semi-finals; Raw/SmackDown; 9/9/19, 9/10/19
Samoa Joe Ricochet	14:40
Baron Corbin	Pin (Note: This was a triple threat match.)
Shane McMahon (Note: Elias was forced to withdraw from the tournament due to suffering an ankle injury and McMahon made himself his replacement.)	8:54 (Note: McMahon made this a two-out-of-three falls match after originally losing to Gable.)
Chad Gable	Sub (Note: McMahon made Kevin Owens the special guest referee.)

Final; Raw; 9/16/19
Baron Corbin	Pin
Chad Gable	19:10

== Aftermath ==
After winning the tournament, Corbin would dub himself King Corbin and would continue to feud with Chad Gable, the tournament runner-up. At Hell in a Cell, Gable would defeat Corbin. At Corbin's request, Gable was announced as Shorty Gable due to his small stature. Gable would embrace this nickname and later change it further to "Shorty G". Corbin would later defeat Shorty G on the October 11 episode of SmackDown to end the feud.

In December 2020, King Corbin started a faction with Steve Cutler and Wesley Blake, knighting them as the "Knights of the Lone Wolf" (with lone wolf a reference to his previous nickname), although this would be short-lived as Cutler was released by WWE in February 2021. Corbin's king gimmick ended in June 2021 after he lost his King of the Ring crown in a match to Shinsuke Nakamura, who then took on a king persona, being called King Nakamura; Corbin subsequently reverted to his original ring name, Baron Corbin. On October 8, 2021, just prior to the start of the 2021 tournament that night, Nakamura respectfully relinquished the crown and reverted to his original ring name of Shinsuke Nakamura.

== Locations ==
Tournament Round	Date(s)	City(s)	Venue(s)	Event(s)
First	August 19, 2019	Saint Paul, Minnesota	Xcel Energy Center	Raw
First	August 20, 2019	Sioux Falls, South Dakota	Denny Sanford Premier Center	SmackDown
First	August 26, 2019	New Orleans, Louisiana	Smoothie King Center	Raw
First	August 27, 2019	Baton Rouge, Louisiana	Raising Cane's River Center Arena	SmackDown
Quarter-finals	September 2, 2019	Baltimore, Maryland	Royal Farms Arena	Raw
Quarter-finals	September 3, 2019	Norfolk, Virginia	Norfolk Scope	SmackDown
Semi-finals	September 9, 2019	New York City	Madison Square Garden	Raw
Semi-finals	September 10, 2019	New York City	Madison Square Garden	SmackDown
Final	September 16, 2019	Knoxville, Tennessee	Thompson-Boling Arena	Raw
