= King of the Ring (2015) =

WWE Network event

- Official logo of the 2015 King of the Ring event and tournament
- Promotion: WWE
- Date: April 28, 2015
- City: Moline, Illinois
- Venue: iWireless Center

WWE event chronology
← Previous; Extreme Rules	Next → Payback

King of the Ring event chronology
← Previous; 2002	Next → 2024

King of the Ring tournament chronology
← Previous; 2010	Next → 2019

King of the Ring
Tournament information
- Sport: Professional wrestling
- Location: United States
- Dates: April 27, 2015–April 28, 2015
- Tournament format: Single elimination tournament
- Participants: 8

Final positions
- Champion: Bad News Barrett
- Runner-up: Neville

Tournament statistics
- Matches played: 7

The 2015 King of the Ring was a professional wrestling livestreaming event produced by WWE. It was the 11th King of the Ring event and hosted the semifinals and finals of the 20th King of the Ring tournament for men. The event took place on Tuesday, April 28, 2015, at the iWireless Center in Moline, Illinois. This was the first dedicated King of the Ring event since 2002 and the first tournament held since 2010. The 2015 tournament was won by Bad News Barrett, who defeated Neville in the final and subsequently became known as King Barrett.

The opening round matches for the tournament were held on the April 27, 2015, episode of Monday Night Raw, which aired on the USA Network from the Resch Center in Green Bay, Wisconsin. Unlike previous King of the Ring events, which aired on traditional pay-per-view (PPV) from 1993 to 2002, the 2015 event was livestreamed exclusively on WWE's online service, the WWE Network, which launched in February 2014 and made it the first King of the Ring event to air on the platform.

Although the tournament continued to be held periodically, this was the last tournament to have a dedicated event until 2024; the event was planned to be revived in 2023 but was canceled and rescheduled for 2024 titled King and Queen of the Ring to incorporate the women's Queen of the Ring tournament, which was established as a female counterpart in 2021. This was also the only tournament held since the end of the first brand extension in 2011, which was reintroduced in 2016. It was also the first King of the Ring event to be promoted under the company's shortened trade name of WWE, as following WrestleMania XXVII in April 2011, the company ceased using its full name of World Wrestling Entertainment, although that remains the legal name of the company.

== Background ==
King of the Ring was a professional wrestling pay-per-view (PPV) event held annually in June by WWE from 1993 to 2002. The PPV was named after the King of the Ring tournament, a men's single-elimination tournament that was established in 1985 and held annually until 1991, except for 1990, with the winner crowned the "King of the Ring"; these early tournaments were held as special non-televised house shows. The King of the Ring event became considered as one of WWE's "Big Five" PPVs, along with Royal Rumble, WrestleMania, SummerSlam, and Survivor Series, the company's five biggest annual shows of the year. However, King of the Ring was discontinued as a PPV event following its 2002 edition, although the tournament continued to be held periodically but concluded at other events, such as Judgment Day for the 2006 tournament.

After 2010, the tournament went on hiatus until it was scheduled to return in 2015 for its 20th tournament. Along with the tournament, the King of the Ring event also returned for the first time since 2002. The tournament itself was held over two nights. The opening round matches were held on the April 27, 2015, episode of Monday Night Raw, which aired on the USA Network from the Resch Center in Green Bay, Wisconsin. The semifinals and final were then held as part of the 11th King of the Ring event the following day on April 28 from the iWireless Center in Moline, Illinois. It aired live on WWE's livestreaming service, the WWE Network, which launched in February 2014.

This was the first King of the Ring event held to be promoted under the company's shortened trade name of WWE, as following WrestleMania XXVII in April 2011, the company ceased using its full name of World Wrestling Entertainment, although that remains the legal name of the company. This was also the first King of the Ring event and tournament to be held following the end of the first brand extension in August 2011.

== Results ==
=== Quarter-finals ===
Raw (Quarter-final matches) – April 27

No.	Results	Stipulations	Times
1	Bad News Barrett defeated Dolph Ziggler	King of the Ring quarterfinal match	8:18
2	R-Truth defeated Stardust	King of the Ring quarterfinal match	3:47
3	Sheamus defeated Dean Ambrose by disqualification	King of the Ring quarterfinal match	12:29
4	Neville defeated Luke Harper	King of the Ring quarterfinal match	10:12

=== Finals ===
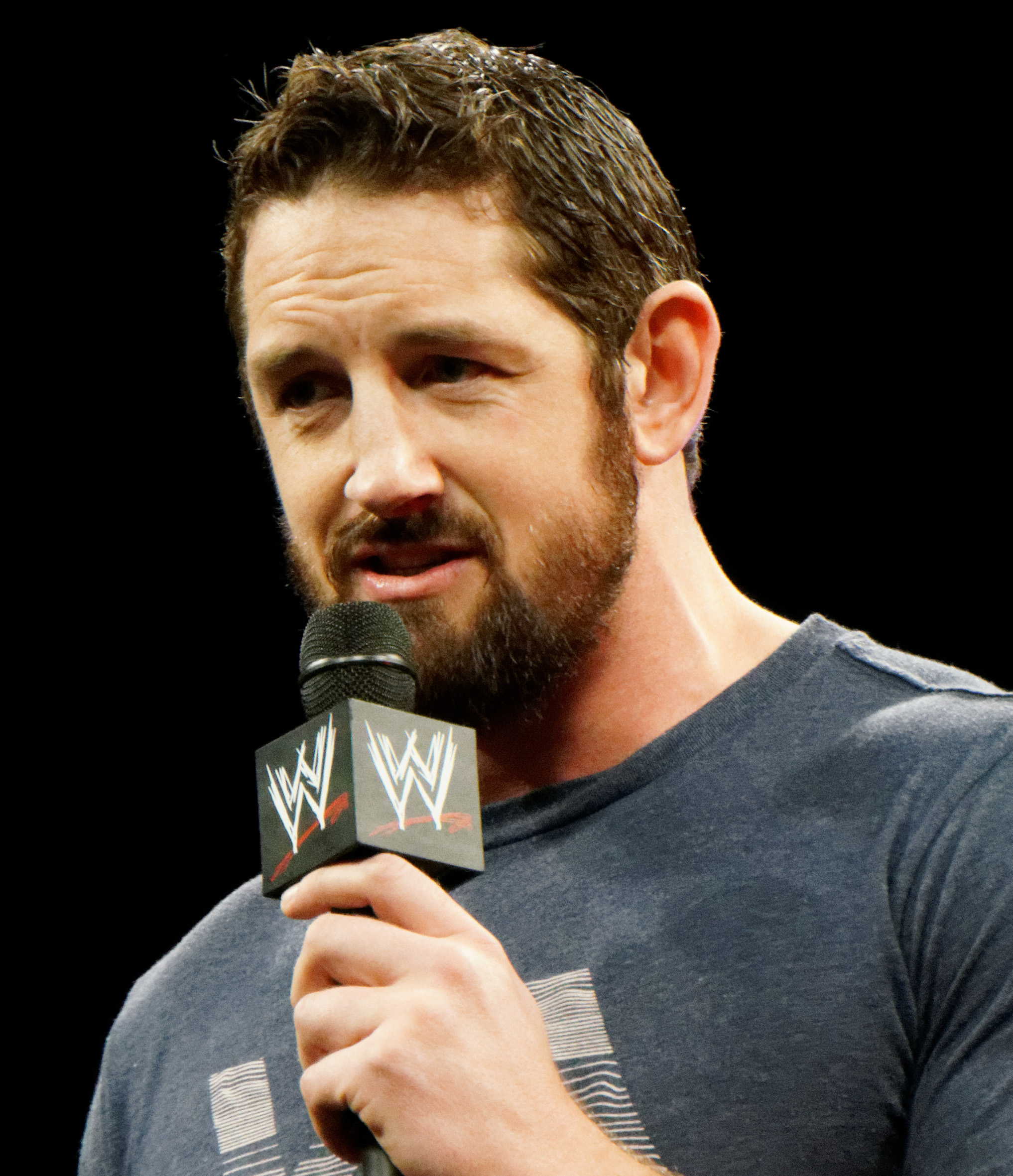
Bad News Barrett, the winner of the 20th King of the Ring tournament.

WWE Network event (Semi-final and final matches) – April 28

No.	Results	Stipulations	Times
1	Neville defeated Sheamus	King of the Ring semifinal match	5:43
2	Bad News Barrett defeated R-Truth	King of the Ring semifinal match	4:37
3	Bad News Barrett defeated Neville	King of the Ring final match	7:10

== Bracket ==
Quarterfinals; Raw; April 27
Dolph Ziggler	8:18
Bad News Barrett	Pin
R-Truth	Pin
Stardust	3:47
Dean Ambrose	12:29
Sheamus	DQ
Neville	Pin
Luke Harper	10:12

Semifinals; WWE Network; April 28
Bad News Barrett	Pin
R-Truth	4:37
Sheamus	5:43
Neville	Pin

Final; WWE Network; April 28
Bad News Barrett	Pin
Neville	7:10

== Aftermath ==
In July 2016, the brand extension was reinstated, with WWE's main roster again divided between the Raw and SmackDown brands. The next King of the Ring tournament was then held in 2019 and was an interbrand tournament, featuring wrestlers from both brands. Each brand had a separate bracket, and the winners of each bracket faced off in the tournament final. Qualifying matches for the 2019 tournament began in August and took place across episodes of Raw and SmackDown. The tournament final was originally scheduled to be held at that year's Clash of Champions PPV, but was rescheduled for the following night's Raw on September 16, 2019.

After eight years, the event was planned to return to PPV and livestreaming in 2023, with that year's event rebranded as "King and Queen of the Ring" to incorporate the women's Queen's Crown tournament that was established in 2021. However, on April 13, it was revealed that WWE decided to scrap the revival and would instead hold Night of Champions, thus reviving the Night of Champions event. It was reported that the decision to change the event to Night of Champions was a creative choice to revive and bring that event to an international market, as well as to please business partners in Saudi Arabia and add intrigue to the show with the crowning of a new World Heavyweight Champion. Fightful later reported that WWE did not have plans to reschedule King and Queen of the Ring for later that year, but the event could possibly be used for a future Saudi Arabian show. King and Queen of the Ring was then rescheduled for Saudi Arabia in May 2024.
