= King of the Ring (2010) =

2010 professional wrestling tournament by WWE

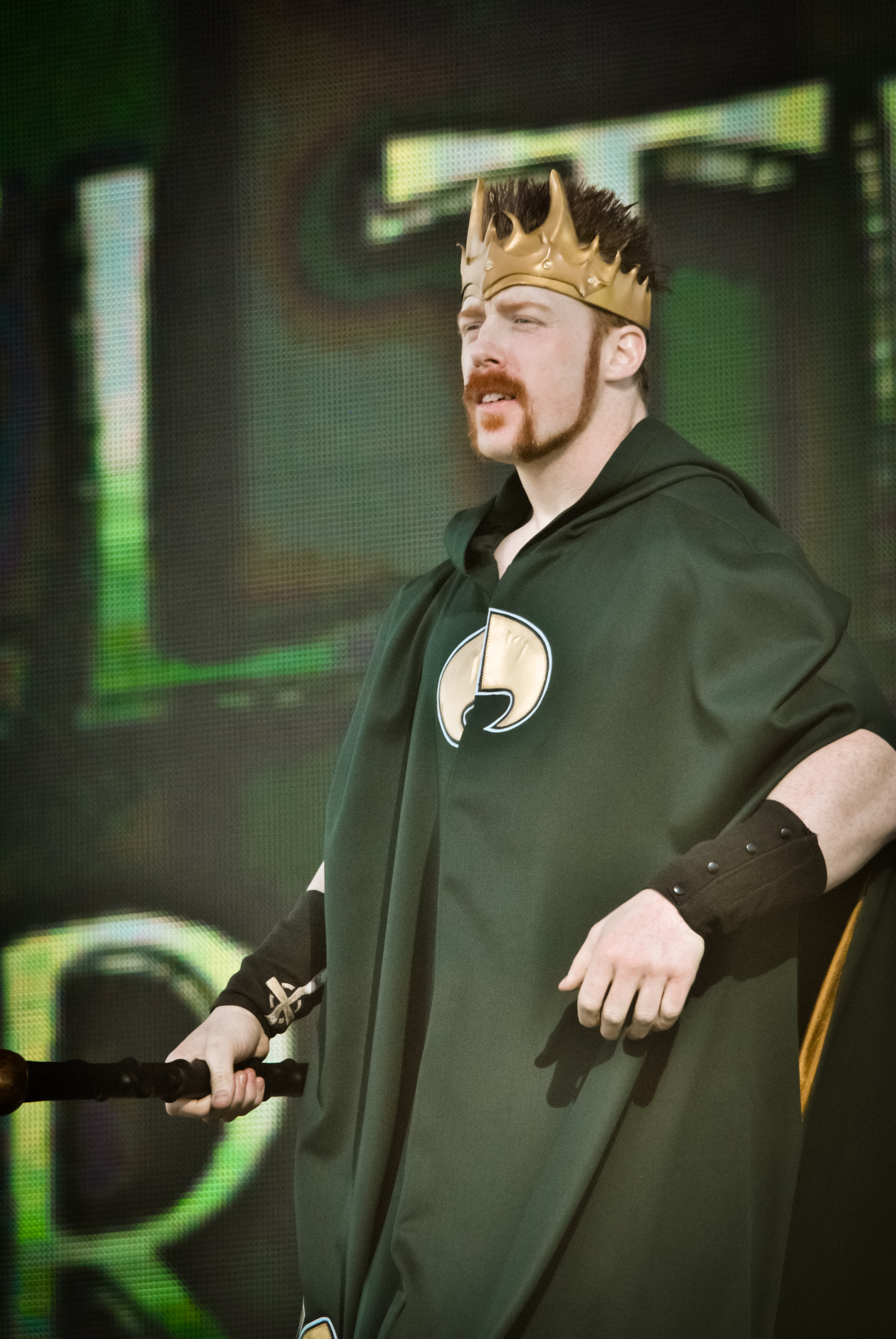
- Sheamus, winner of the 2010 King of the Ring tournament at the 2010 Tribute to the Troops
- Promotion: World Wrestling Entertainment
- Brand(s): Raw; SmackDown
- Date: November 29, 2010
- City: Philadelphia, Pennsylvania
- Venue: Wells Fargo Center

King of the Ring tournament chronology
← Previous; 2008	Next → 2015

King of the Ring (2010)
Tournament information
- Sport: Professional wrestling
- Location: United States
- Date: November 29, 2010
- Tournament format: Single elimination tournament
- Participants: 16

Final positions
- Champion: Sheamus
- Runner-up: John Morrison

Tournament statistics
- Matches played: 14

The 2010 King of the Ring was the 19th edition of the King of the Ring tournament produced by World Wrestling Entertainment (WWE). The tournament was held as a special episode of Raw that aired on November 29, 2010, at the Wells Fargo Center in Philadelphia, Pennsylvania; qualifying matches were held the previous week. Unlike the previous 2008 tournament that featured wrestlers from the Raw, SmackDown, and ECW brand divisions, the 2010 tournament only featured wrestlers from Raw and SmackDown following the closure of the ECW brand in February 2010. The 2010 tournament was won by Raw's Sheamus, who defeated John Morrison, also from Raw, in the tournament final and subsequently became known as King Sheamus.

Despite the show being mainly focused on the King of the Ring tournament, the main event featured Jerry Lawler (who was celebrating his birthday that day) facing WWE Champion The Miz for the title in a Tables, Ladders, and Chairs match, which marked Lawler's first match for the WWE Championship. Lawler lost due to distractions from Alex Riley and Michael Cole. CM Punk joined on commentary for the show.

== Background ==
The King of the Ring tournament is a single-elimination tournament that was established by World Wrestling Entertainment (WWE) in 1985 with the winner being crowned "King of the Ring." It was held annually until 1991, with the exception of 1990. These early tournaments were held as special non-televised house shows and were held when the promotion was still called the World Wrestling Federation (WWF, renamed to WWE in 2002). In 1993, the promotion began to produce the King of the Ring tournament as a self-titled pay-per-view (PPV). Unlike the previous non-televised events, the PPV did not feature all of the tournament's matches. Instead, several of the qualifying matches preceded the event with the final few matches then taking place at the pay-per-view. There were also other matches that took place at the event as it was a traditional three-hour pay-per-view.

King of the Ring continued as the annual June PPV until the 2002 event, which was the final King of the Ring produced as a PPV. Following the conclusion of the PPV chronology, the tournament began to be held periodically every few years, first making its return in 2006, which was held exclusively for wrestlers from the SmackDown! brand. The 2010 tournament was the 19th King of the Ring tournament. Although the 2008 tournament featured wrestlers from all three of WWE's brands at the time—Raw, SmackDown, and ECW—the 2010 tournament only featured Raw and SmackDown as the ECW brand was disbanded in February 2010. The tournament took place as a special episode of Raw that aired on November 29, 2010, at the Wells Fargo Center in Philadelphia, Pennsylvania; qualifying matches were held the previous week on the November 22 and 26 episodes of Raw and SmackDown, respectively.

== Qualifying matches ==
On the November 22 episode of Raw, it was announced that an eight-man interpromotional King of the Ring tournament would take place between wrestlers from Raw and SmackDown the following week on Raw, with the last tournament being held in 2008, which was won by William Regal. Later that night, qualifying matches were held between wrestlers of the Raw brand. In the first match, Sheamus defeated R-Truth. The next qualifying match was scheduled between Ezekiel Jackson and Raw Mr. Money in the Bank The Miz. However, Miz's NXT season two rookie Alex Riley substituted for him because Miz had "suffered an anxiety attack", with Jackson defeating Riley. In the third qualifying match, United States Champion Daniel Bryan defeated Ted DiBiase Jr. in a non-title match. In the final qualifying match for the Raw roster, John Morrison defeated Tyson Kidd. The qualification for the tournament continued on the November 26 episode of SmackDown, with qualifying matches being held between wrestlers of the SmackDown brand. Kofi Kingston became the first person from the SmackDown roster to qualify for the tournament by defeating Jack Swagger. In the second qualifying match, Alberto Del Rio defeated Big Show by countout. In the third match, Drew McIntyre defeated MVP. In the final qualifying match for the SmackDown roster, "Dashing" Cody Rhodes defeated Rey Mysterio.

== Bracket ==
Qualifiers
Raw	Sheamus	Pin
Raw	R-Truth	11:05
SmackDown	Kofi Kingston	Pin
SmackDown	Jack Swagger	17:22
SmackDown	Drew McIntyre	Pin
SmackDown	MVP	5:23
Raw	Ezekiel Jackson	Pin
Raw	Alex Riley	1:55
Raw	John Morrison	Pin
Raw	Tyson Kidd	3:18
SmackDown	Cody Rhodes	Pin
SmackDown	Rey Mysterio	8:24
SmackDown	Alberto Del Rio	CO
SmackDown	Big Show	8:03
Raw	Daniel Bryan	Sub
Raw	Ted DiBiase	1:53

Quarterfinals
Raw	Sheamus	Pin
SmackDown	Kofi Kingston	4:06
SmackDown	Drew McIntyre	DCO
Raw	Ezekiel Jackson	2:42
Raw	John Morrison	Pin
SmackDown	Cody Rhodes	3:37
SmackDown	Alberto Del Rio	Sub
Raw	Daniel Bryan	9:41

Semifinals
Raw	Sheamus	N/A
BYE
Raw	John Morrison	Pin
SmackDown	Alberto Del Rio	3:25

Final
Raw	Sheamus	Pin
Raw	John Morrison	12:05

== Aftermath ==
In April 2011, WWE ceased using its full name with the "WWE" abbreviation becoming an orphaned initialism. That August, the brand extension ended, thus all shows and pay-per-views featured WWE's full main roster. After another few years, the next King of the Ring tournament was held in 2015. Qualifying matches for the 2015 tournament took place on the April 27 episode of Raw. The semifinals and final were then held on the following day as a WWE Network-exclusive event, which was the first and so far only other King of the Ring event to have a separate dedicated event since the 2002 pay-per-view.
