= King of the Ring (2008) =

2008 professional wrestling tournament by WWE

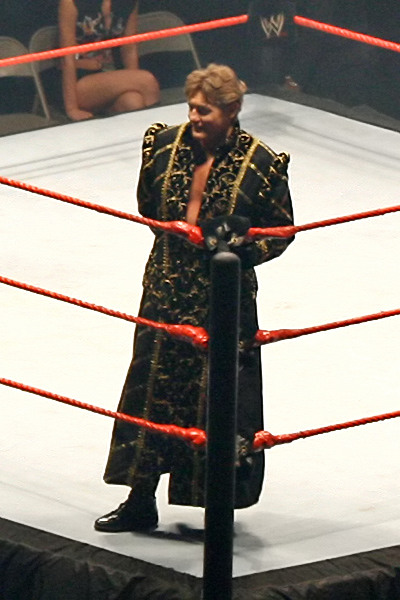
- William Regal, winner of the 2008 King of the Ring tournament
- Promotion: World Wrestling Entertainment
- Brand(s): Raw; SmackDown; ECW
- Date: April 21, 2008
- City: Greenville, South Carolina
- Venue: BI-LO Center

King of the Ring tournament chronology
← Previous; 2006	Next → 2010

The 2008 King of the Ring was the 18th edition of the King of the Ring tournament produced by World Wrestling Entertainment (WWE). It was held as a special episode of Raw on April 21, 2008, at BI-LO Center in Greenville, South Carolina. Unlike the previous 2006 tournament that only featured wrestlers from the SmackDown brand division, the 2008 tournament featured wrestlers from all three of WWE's brands at the time—Raw, SmackDown, and ECW. The 2008 tournament was won by Raw's William Regal, who defeated ECW's CM Punk in the final.

== Background ==
The King of the Ring tournament is a single-elimination tournament that was established by World Wrestling Entertainment (WWE) in 1985 with the winner being crowned "King of the Ring." It was held annually until 1991, with the exception of 1990. These early tournaments were held as special non-televised house shows and were held when the promotion was still called the World Wrestling Federation (WWF, renamed to WWE in 2002). In 1993, the promotion began to produce the King of the Ring tournament as a self-titled pay-per-view (PPV). Unlike the previous non-televised events, the PPV did not feature all of the tournament's matches. Instead, several of the qualifying matches preceded the event with the final few matches then taking place at the pay-per-view. There were also other matches that took place at the event as it was a traditional three-hour pay-per-view.

King of the Ring continued as the annual June PPV until the 2002 event, which was the final King of the Ring produced as a PPV. Following the conclusion of the PPV chronology, the tournament began to be held periodically every few years, first making its return in 2006, which was held exclusively for wrestlers from the SmackDown! brand. The 2008 tournament was the 18th King of the Ring tournament and featured wrestlers from all three of WWE's brands at the time: Raw, SmackDown, and ECW. The tournament took place as a special episode of Raw on April 21, 2008, at BI-LO Center in Greenville, South Carolina.

== Matches ==
=== Quarter-finals ===
The show started with the quarter-final round of the 2008 King of the Ring tournament pitting the WWE Intercontinental Champion Chris Jericho against the WWE United States Champion Montel Vontavious Porter (MVP). MVP began dominating Jericho until Jericho performed a Springboard Dropkick on MVP. MVP regained his momentum and performed a Delayed Elbow Drop, which he calls Ballin' Elbow for a near-fall. MVP began working on Jericho's face and applied a Three-quarter Facelock and followed by executing Knee Lifts. MVP performed a Big Boot for a near-fall. Jericho tried to perform a Diving Crossbody but MVP countered it into a Flapjack. However, Jericho recovered and executed a One-Handed Bulldog. Jericho tried to perform a Springboard Moonsault which he calls Lionsault but MVP avoided the move. MVP tried to finish Jericho with an Overdrive which he calls Playmaker but Jericho countered it into an Elevated Boston Crab which he calls Walls of Jericho. Jericho forced MVP to submit to the Walls of Jericho. The second match in the quarter-final was between Matt Hardy and the Mr. Money in the Bank CM Punk. Hardy and Punk started the match by utilizing submission maneuvers against each other. Punk began dominating the match and attacked Hardy sending him to the corner. Hardy took advantage and executed a Flying Back Elbow on Punk's head. Hardy whipped Punk into the corner and executed a Corner Clothesline followed by a Bulldog which was countered by Punk. Punk whipped Hardy into the corner and executed a Step Up High Knee and a Bulldog. Punk tried to finish the match by attempting a Fireman's Carry Knee Strike which he calls Go To Sleep on Hardy. Hardy reversed and executed a Wrist-Lock Side Slam which he calls Side Effect. Hardy attempted a Front Facelock Three-Quarter Facelock Cutter which he calls Twist of Fate on Punk. Punk countered it into a Go 2 Sleep but Hardy attempted a Sunset Flip on Punk. Punk sat and held the Roll-Up to win the match.

The third match in the quarter-final was between Finlay and The Great Khali. Khali dominated Finlay with a Lariat and a Scoop Slam, followed by a Leg Drop attempt. However, Finlay avoided the Leg Drop and began beating on Khali. Khali threw Finlay into the corner and continued assaulting him into the corner. Khali grabbed Finlay and took him outside the ring and wrapped Finlay's knee into the ring post. Khali continuously slammed it into the ring post, causing the referee to disqualify Khali. After the match, Khali continued to assault Finlay until Big Show came to chase Khali. Finlay was being helped by Hornswoggle and WWE staff to the backstage.

At the same time, the Raw General Manager William Regal was making his entrance to the ring for his tournament quarter-final match. It was announced that Hornswoggle would be Regal's opponent. Regal easily defeated Hornswoggle by forcing him to submit to a Cross-Legged STF which he calls Regal Stretch. After the match, Finlay tried to rescue Hornswoggle but was attacked by Regal.

=== Semi-finals ===
The semi-final of the King of the Ring tournament began with Chris Jericho taking on CM Punk. Jericho and Punk exchanged blows until Jericho executed a Springboard Dropkick. Punk followed by attempting a Springboard Clothesline but Jericho dropkicked the ropes and Punk crashed on the ropes. Jericho applied a Backbreaker on Punk until Punk countered and executed a Spinning Wheel Kick. Jericho tried to pin Punk with a Roll-Up but Punk kicked out. Jericho applied Walls of Jericho on Punk and Punk fought of the hold but Jericho executed an Enzuigiri. Punk recovered and executed a Scoop Powerslam, followed by a series of kicks to Jericho. Jericho would deliver a Bulldog and tried to execute a Lionsault on Punk but Punk blocked the move. Jericho applied Walls of Jericho on Punk for a second time in the match. Punk broke the hold and executed a Go 2 Sleep to win the match.

The next semi-final match was between Finlay and William Regal. Regal targeted Finlay's injured knee and attacked it. However, Finlay protected his knee and tried to battle Regal but Regal continued to attack it and injured Finlay's head. Finlay regained momentum and executed a Double Foot Stomp and attempted a Celtic Cross on Regal. Regal fought off the move, kicked Finlay's head, and applied a Regal Stretch on Finlay. Finlay was knocked out and as a result, Regal advanced to the final.

=== Final ===
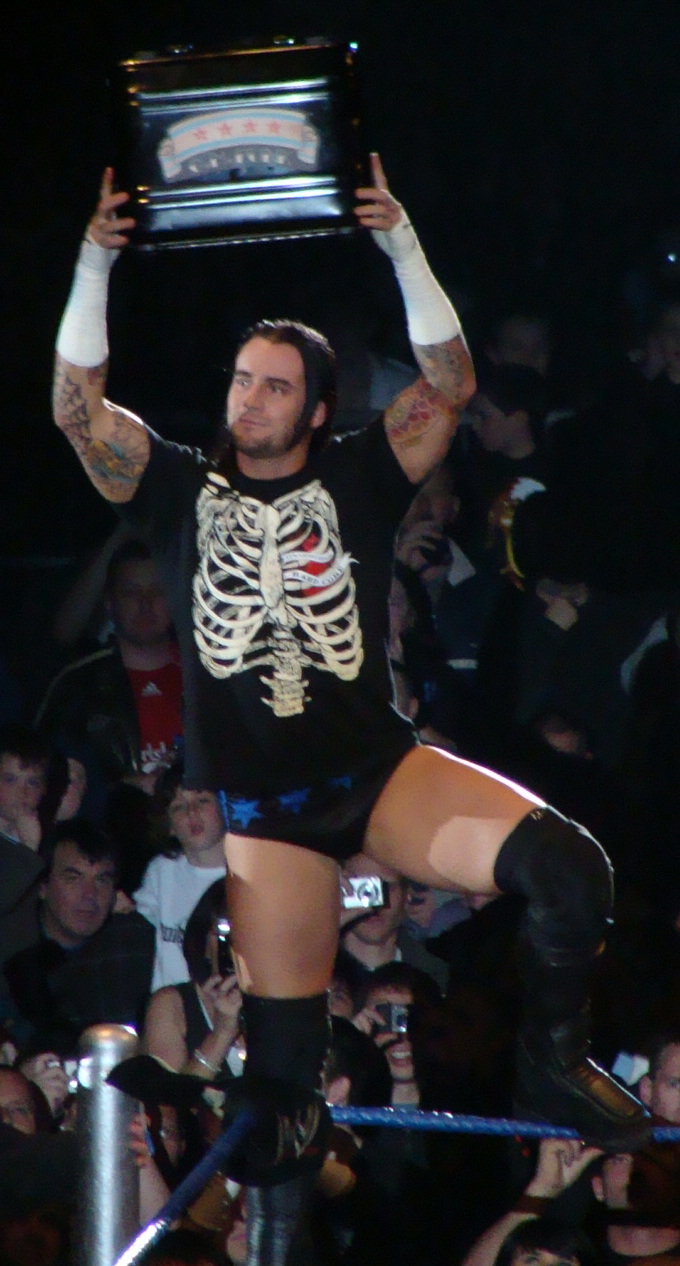
Mr. Money in the Bank CM Punk lost in the final of the tournament.

The King of the Ring Final match took place pitting CM Punk against William Regal. Regal attacked Punk into the corner until the referee broke it up and Punk kicked Regal and placed him in the corner. Punk executed a Shining Wizard and attempted a Bulldog but Regal executed a Bridging Belly To Back Suplex, which he calls Regal-Plex. Regal followed by applying a Bow And Arrow Stretch on Punk. Punk and Regal would exchange blows until Punk attempted to hit a Go 2 Sleep. However, Regal caught the top rope and executed a Running High Knee which he calls Knee Trembler. Regal attempted a Regal Stretch on Punk. Punk tried to break the hold but Regal continued to punch Punk, forcing him to tap out to the hold.

== Aftermath ==
After winning the King of the Ring tournament, William Regal began feuding with Mr. Kennedy, who interfered in Regal's King of the Ring coronation ceremony on April 28 edition of Raw. This would lead to a Loser Gets Fired match between Kennedy and Regal on May 19 edition of Raw. Kennedy defeated Regal, forcing Regal to quit and vacate his position as the Raw General Manager.

Many of the participants in the King of the Ring tournament participated at Backlash pay-per-view. The WWE Intercontinental Champion Chris Jericho served as the Special Guest Referee for the match between Shawn Michaels and Batista. Montel Vontavious Porter (MVP) and Matt Hardy, two of the participants in the tournament competed for MVP's WWE United States Championship. Hardy defeated MVP to win the championship. Another participant The Great Khali wrestled at the event against Big Show in a losing effort.

The participants of the main event of April 21 episode of Raw were all involved in matches at Backlash. The Undertaker defeated Edge to retain the World Heavyweight Championship. Kane defeated Chavo Guerrero Jr. to retain the ECW Championship. Randy Orton defended the WWE Championship against Triple H, John Cena and John "Bradshaw" Layfield in a Fatal Four Way Elimination match. Triple H won the championship.

On June 23, CM Punk was drafted to the Raw brand during the 2008 WWE draft. During the June 30 episode of Raw, after Batista beat down World Heavyweight Champion Edge, Punk cashed in his Money in the Bank contract and won the World Heavyweight Championship.

The next King of the Ring tournament was held in 2010. Qualifying matches for the 2010 tournament took place on the November 22 and 26 episodes of Raw and SmackDown, respectively, while the semifinals and final were held on the November 26 episode of Raw. It was also an interbrand tournament, but only included wrestlers from Raw and SmackDown as the ECW brand was disbanded in February 2010.

== Results ==
No.	Results	Stipulations	Times
1^{D}	Ron Killings defeated Trevor Murdoch	Singles match	5:02
2	Chris Jericho defeated Montel Vontavious Porter by submission	King of the Ring Quarter-Final match	5:05
3	CM Punk defeated Matt Hardy	King of the Ring Quarter-Final match	3:45
4	Finlay (with Hornswoggle) defeated The Great Khali by disqualification	King of the Ring Quarter-Final match	1:59
5	William Regal defeated Hornswoggle by submission	King of the Ring Quarter-Final match	0:18
6	Carlito (with Santino Marella) defeated Hardcore Holly (with Cody Rhodes)	Singles match	5:02
7	CM Punk defeated Chris Jericho	King of the Ring Semi-Final match	6:21
8	William Regal defeated Finlay by technical submission	King of the Ring Semi-Final match	3:37
9	William Regal defeated CM Punk by submission	King of the Ring Final match	4:07
10	Randy Orton, Edge, Chavo Guerrero and John "Bradshaw" Layfield defeated The Undertaker, Kane, Triple H and John Cena	Eight-man tag team match	10:05
D / – this was a dark match

=== Tournament brackets ===
The tournament was held on April 21, 2008, edition of Raw.

Quarterfinals
Raw	Chris Jericho	Sub
SmackDown	Montel Vontavious Porter	5:05
ECW	CM Punk	Pin
SmackDown	Matt Hardy	3:45
SmackDown	The Great Khali	1:59
SmackDown	Finlay	DQ
Raw	William Regal	Sub
SmackDown	Hornswoggle	0:18

Semifinals
Raw	Chris Jericho	6:21
ECW	CM Punk	Pin
SmackDown	Finlay	3:37
Raw	William Regal	KO

Final
ECW	CM Punk	4:07
Raw	William Regal	Sub
