= SummerSlam (2002) =

World Wrestling Entertainment pay-per-view event

- Promotional poster featuring The Rock
- Promotion: World Wrestling Entertainment
- Brand(s): Raw; SmackDown!
- Date: August 25, 2002
- City: Uniondale, New York
- Venue: Nassau Coliseum
- Attendance: 14,797
- Buy rate: 540,000

Pay-per-view chronology
← Previous; Vengeance	Next → Unforgiven

SummerSlam chronology
← Previous; 2001	Next → 2003

The 2002 SummerSlam was a professional wrestling pay-per-view (PPV) event produced by World Wrestling Entertainment (WWE). It was the 15th annual SummerSlam and took place on August 25, 2002, at the Nassau Coliseum in Uniondale, New York, held for wrestlers from the promotion's Raw and SmackDown! brand divisions. This was the first SummerSlam held following the introduction of the brand extension in March, as well as the first SummerSlam held under the WWE name, after the promotion was renamed from World Wrestling Federation (WWF) to WWE in May, and the first of the Ruthless Aggression Era.

The main match on the SmackDown! brand was for the WWE Undisputed Championship between The Rock and Brock Lesnar. Lesnar won the match and the championship after pinning Rock following an F-5, and would go on to become a major WWE star hereafter whereas The Rock would enter a hiatus. The main match on the Raw brand featured an Unsanctioned Street Fight between Shawn Michaels, returning for his first SummerSlam since 1997, and Triple H, which Michaels won after pinning Triple H by reversing Triple H's Pedigree attempt into a jackknife roll-up. There was also an interpromotional match for the Intercontinental Championship between Rob Van Dam from Raw and Chris Benoit from SmackDown!, which Van Dam won by pinfall after performing a Five-Star Frog Splash. The other matches on the undercard included The Undertaker versus Test and Kurt Angle versus Rey Mysterio.

== Production ==
=== Background ===
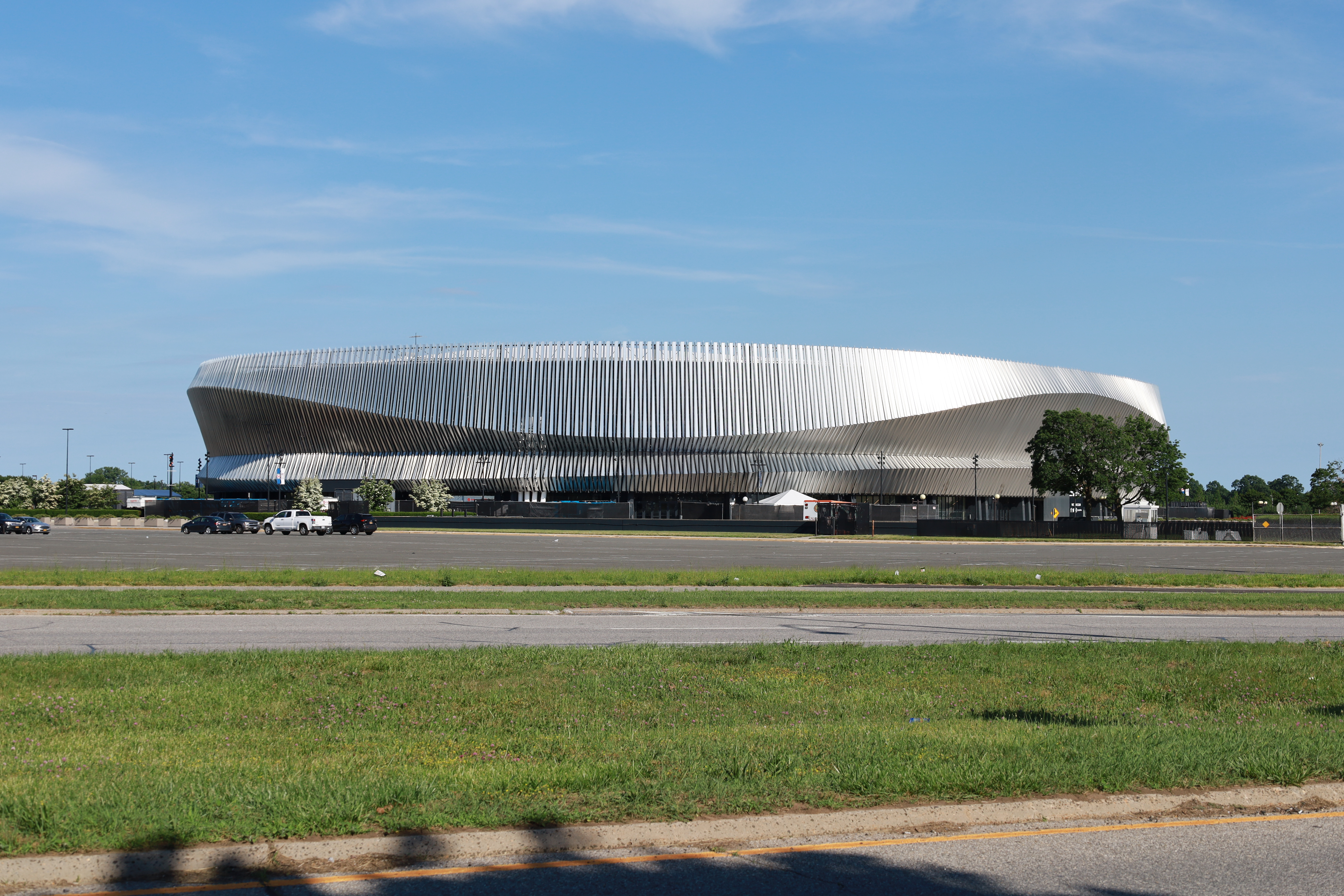
The event was held at the Nassau Veterans Memorial Coliseum in Uniondale, New York.

SummerSlam is an annual professional wrestling pay-per-view (PPV) produced every August by World Wrestling Entertainment (WWE) since 1988. Dubbed "The Biggest Party of the Summer", it is one of the promotion's original four pay-per-views, along with WrestleMania, Royal Rumble, and Survivor Series, referred to as the "Big Four", and was considered one of the "Big Five" PPVs with the addition of King of the Ring in 1993 until it was discontinued as an annual PPV after its 2002 event in June. It has since become considered WWE's second biggest event of the year behind WrestleMania. The 15th SummerSlam event was scheduled to be held on August 25, 2002, at the Nassau Veterans Memorial Coliseum in Uniondale, New York.

This was the first SummerSlam to occur under the first brand extension introduced in March, which split the roster between the Raw and SmackDown! brands where wrestlers were exclusively assigned to perform; SummerSlam featured wrestlers from both brands. It was also the first SummerSlam to occur under the WWE name, following the promotion being renamed from World Wrestling Federation (WWF) to WWE in May.

With this event, SummerSlam became the first pay-per-view to have events in the three major indoor venues in the New York metropolitan area. Madison Square Garden hosted the event in 1988, 1991, and 1998, and the Izod Center in East Rutherford, New Jersey hosted the event in 1989, 1997, and later in 2007.

=== Storylines ===
The professional wrestling matches at SummerSlam featured professional wrestlers performing as characters in scripted events pre-determined by the hosting promotion, WWE. Storylines between the characters were produced on WWE's weekly television shows Raw and SmackDown! with the Raw and SmackDown! brands—storyline divisions in which WWE assigned its employees to different programs. The SummerSlam was notably also the first of the Ruthless Aggression Era.

==== SmackDown! ====
The main feud heading into SummerSlam on the SmackDown! brand was between The Rock and Brock Lesnar, with the two feuding over the WWE Undisputed Championship. On the June 24 episode of Raw, it was announced that Lesnar would face off against the WWE Undisputed Champion at SummerSlam, as a result of winning the King of the Ring tournament. At Vengeance, The Rock defeated The Undertaker and Kurt Angle in a triple threat match to win the WWE Undisputed Championship by pinning Angle after executing a Rock Bottom. On the July 25 episode of SmackDown!, during The Rock's WWE Tag Team Championship match against The Un-Americans (Lance Storm and Christian), Lesnar interfered by nailing The Rock's tag team partner Hollywood Hulk Hogan with an F-5. Due to Lesnar's interference, The Rock and Hogan won the match by disqualification, but not the titles. On the August 8 episode of SmackDown!, Lesnar put his SummerSlam title shot on the line against Hogan with the stipulation added that if Hogan were to defeat Lesnar, he would face The Rock in a WrestleMania X8 rematch at SummerSlam for the WWE Undisputed Championship. At the end, Lesnar locked Hogan in a bear hug. When Hogan (kayfabe) passed out, the referee stopped the contest. After the match, Lesnar then nailed Hogan in the head with the steel chair, causing Hogan to bleed. On the August 15 episode of SmackDown!, The Rock took on the WWE Intercontinental Champion Chris Benoit in a "Champion vs. Champion" match, which Lesnar interfered once again. During the match, Lesnar taunted The Rock while The Rock was placed in the Crippler Crossface by Benoit. The Rock, however, was able to defeat Benoit following a Rock Bottom. On the August 22 episode of SmackDown!, after The Rock and Edge defeated Benoit and Eddie Guerrero in a tag team match, Lesnar appeared for another stare down with The Rock, which led to a brawl between the two that ended the show.

On the July 25 episode of SmackDown!, Rey Mysterio made his WWE debut by defeating Chavo Guerrero. On the August 8 episode of SmackDown!, the team of Mysterio, Edge and John Cena defeated Chris Benoit, Eddie Guerrero and Kurt Angle when Mysterio pinned Angle. On the August 15 episode of SmackDown!, Angle insulted Mysterio during a backstage interview and Mysterio confronted him and challenged him to a match at SummerSlam, which Angle accepted. Later that night, Mysterio attacked Angle after his match against Mark Henry and delivered a 619 to Angle. On the August 22 episode of SmackDown!, Mysterio cost Angle a match against Billy Kidman by attacking Angle.

==== Raw ====
Another feud heading into SummerSlam was between Shawn Michaels and Triple H. At Vengeance, Michaels returned after being out of wrestling (due to a back injury) for four years. Triple H was given the choice of deciding which brand he would appear for, Raw or SmackDown!, and Michaels helped him decide by offering to reform D-Generation X (DX) on the Raw brand. Triple H chose to go to the Raw brand, but on the July 22 episode of Raw, as Michaels and Triple H were in the middle of reforming DX, Triple H turned on Michaels by nailing him with the Pedigree. On the July 29 episode of Raw, Michaels was found in the parking lot, laying motionless following an ambush. He was also bleeding from the head due to someone putting his head through a car window. On the August 5 episode of Raw, a security camera revealed to be Triple H that had attacked Michaels from behind. Triple H told Michaels that he did it to prove a point that Michaels was "weak". Michaels then told Triple H that he wasn't 100%, but he would be at SummerSlam. On the August 19 episode of Raw, Raw General Manager Eric Bischoff announced an Unsanctioned Street Fight between Triple H and Michaels for SummerSlam. Later that night, Michaels interfered in Triple H's non-title match with The Rock and assaulted Triple H. At the beginning of the show, Brock Lesnar bought a front-row seat ticket to watch the main event between The Rock and Triple H, but even when Lesnar tried to interfere on Triple H's behalf, Michaels delivered a Sweet Chin Music to Lesnar. Michaels then leaped on top of Triple H and the security and ended the show by knocking Triple H down, sending a clear message that he was not weak as they headed into their match at SummerSlam.

Rob Van Dam and Chris Benoit, meanwhile, had been feuding over the WWE Intercontinental Championship since Benoit won it from Van Dam on the July 29 episode of Raw. Shortly after this match, Benoit took advantage of what was referred to as "open season" on wrestler contracts and took his title with him to the SmackDown! brand, where he had originally been drafted. Benoit was still required to defend the title against a member of the Raw roster at SummerSlam and Van Dam defeated Jeff Hardy on the August 12 episode of Raw in a match to determine the #1 contender.

== Event ==
Other on-screen personnel
Role:	Name:
English commentators	Jim Ross (Raw)
English commentators	Jerry Lawler (Raw)
English commentators	Michael Cole (SmackDown!)
English commentators	Tazz (SmackDown!)
Spanish commentators	Carlos Cabrera
Spanish commentators	Hugo Savinovich
Backstage interviewers	Jonathan Coachman
Backstage interviewers	Lilian Garcia
Ring announcers	Howard Finkel (Raw)
Ring announcers	Tony Chimel (SmackDown!)
Referees	Charles Robinson
Referees	Mike Chioda
Referees	Nick Patrick
Referees	Jack Doan
Referees	Earl Hebner
Referees	Chad Patton
Referees	Brian Hebner
Referees	Jim Korderas
General Managers	Eric Bischoff (Raw)
General Managers	Stephanie McMahon (SmackDown!)

The event unofficially began with a Sunday Night Heat match between Spike Dudley and Steven Richards. Dudley pinned Richards.

=== Preliminary matches ===
The first match was between Kurt Angle and Rey Mysterio. The match started off with Mysterio getting the advantage over Angle, as he hid under the ring, and when Mysterio's music hit, he took down Angle with a headscissors. The two entered the ring, which saw Mysterio execute a headscissors takeover. Mysterio attempted the 619 but Angle ducked and dominated Mysterio. However, Mysterio was able to execute a senton from the ring to the floor on Angle. Mysterio then delivered the 619 and the West Coast Pop for a nearfall. Angle reversed a diving hurricarana into the ankle lock, to which Mysterio submitted.

The next match was a contest between Ric Flair and Chris Jericho. Jericho put Flair into the figure-four leglock. Jericho insisted that Flair submitted, but the referee ordered the match to continue. Flair then won the match by applying the hold on Jericho.

The third match of the night was between Edge and Eddie Guerrero. During the match, Guerrero targeted Edge's shoulder. Guerrero also countered a spear attempt with a dropkick to the shoulder, and executed a frog splash onto Edge's shoulder. Edge retaliated with an Edgecution and a spear for the win.

The next match was for the WWE Tag Team Championship between The Un-Americans (Lance Storm and Christian) and Booker T and Goldust. During the match, Booker T executed a scissors kick to both Storm and Christian, but Test made a run-in and gave Booker T a big boot. Christian pinned Booker T to retain the titles for The Un-Americans.

The fifth match on the card was for the Intercontinental Championship between Chris Benoit and Rob Van Dam. Van Dam won the title by pinning Benoit after a Five Star Frog Splash.

The Undertaker against Test was next. Lance Storm and Christian both interfered in the match, but received a chokeslam from The Undertaker. The Undertaker won the match with a Tombstone Piledriver. After the match, The Undertaker waved an American flag.

The seventh match was the Unsanctioned Street Fight between Shawn Michaels and Triple H. This was Shawn Michaels' first wrestling match since WrestleMania XIV. Michaels came out fast, using a punch-kick offense to start and executing a plancha. Triple H executed a series of backbreakers on Michaels. Michaels hit Triple H with a ladder. Michaels executed a splash on Triple H from the top rope through a table on the floor and a diving elbow drop off a ladder. The match came to an end when Michaels went for the Sweet Chin Music, which Triple H countered into a Pedigree attempt, but Michaels countered into a jackknife roll-up for the win. After the match, Triple H hit Michaels with a sledgehammer twice, forcing Michaels to be carried away on a stretcher.

=== Main event match ===
The main event was for the WWE Undisputed Championship between The Rock and Brock Lesnar. Lesnar dominated early with some power moves. The Rock went for the Sharpshooter. Lesnar's manager Paul Heyman got involved in the match, as he was attacked by The Rock, who executed a Rock Bottom through a broadcast table on Heyman. The Rock and Lesnar gave each other a Rock Bottom. The match came to an end when Lesnar stopped a People's Elbow and a Rock Bottom and then executed the F-5 on The Rock for the win and the title. Lesnar remained the youngest world champion in WWE history until Randy Orton won the World Heavyweight Championship in 2004.

== Aftermath ==
On the August 26 episode of Raw, due to the requirements of the WWE Undisputed Championship being defended on both shows, Raw General Manager Eric Bischoff expected Brock Lesnar to be able to return on Raw the next night. Lesnar and SmackDown! General Manager Stephanie McMahon appeared to announce that Lesnar's contract only required him to defend the title on SmackDown!; subsequently Bischoff established the World Heavyweight Championship as a separate world title. On the September 2 episode of Raw, Bischoff awarded Triple H, Raw's designated number-one contender, the World Heavyweight Championship in the form of the Big Gold Belt.

The Undertaker went on to challenge Brock Lesnar for the now-renamed WWE Championship at Unforgiven, and again at No Mercy in a Hell in a Cell match. Shawn Michaels would return full-time to the ring at Survivor Series and win the World Heavyweight Championship from Triple H in the first ever Elimination Chamber match.

After the broadcasting of the event had stopped after the main event, former WWE Undisputed Champion The Rock was visibly angry at the crowd reaction. The Rock had faced a negative response from fans during the main event. When he tried to do a post-show speech for the crowd, the fans attending the Nassau Coliseum still booed him. He eventually cut a promo, declaring that "sing-along with The Rock is over!", before taking a five-month hiatus from WWE. The Rock did not return until late January 2003, where he turned heel on Hulk Hogan, leading to a WrestleMania X8 rematch at No Way Out where special guest referee Sylvain Grenier and Mr. McMahon both interfered and helped The Rock defeat Hogan.

== Results ==
No.	Results	Stipulations	Times
1^{H}	Spike Dudley defeated Steven Richards	Singles match	2:35
2	Kurt Angle defeated Rey Mysterio	Singles match	9:19
3	Ric Flair defeated Chris Jericho	Singles match	10:22
4	Edge defeated Eddie Guerrero	Singles match	11:47
5	The Un-Americans (Christian and Lance Storm) (c) defeated Booker T and Goldust	Tag team match for the WWE Tag Team Championship	9:37
6	Rob Van Dam defeated Chris Benoit (c)	Singles match for the WWE Intercontinental Championship	16:30
7	The Undertaker defeated Test	Singles match	8:18
8	Shawn Michaels defeated Triple H	Unsanctioned match	27:20
9	Brock Lesnar (with Paul Heyman) defeated The Rock (c)	Singles match for the WWE Undisputed Championship	15:58
(c) / – the champion(s) heading into the match; H / – the match was broadcast prior to the pay-per-view on Sunday Night Heat
