= King of the Ring (2002) =

World Wrestling Entertainment pay-per-view event

- Promotional poster
- Promotion: World Wrestling Entertainment
- Brand(s): Raw; SmackDown!
- Date: June 23, 2002
- City: Columbus, Ohio
- Venue: Nationwide Arena
- Attendance: 14,198
- Buy rate: 320,000

Pay-per-view chronology
← Previous; Judgment Day	Next → Vengeance

King of the Ring event chronology
← Previous; 2001	Next → 2015

King of the Ring tournament chronology
← Previous; 2001	Next → 2006

The 2002 King of the Ring was a professional wrestling pay-per-view (PPV) event produced by World Wrestling Entertainment (WWE). It was the 10th annual King of the Ring event and hosted the finals of the 16th King of the Ring tournament for men. It took place on June 23, 2002, at the Nationwide Arena in Columbus, Ohio, held for wrestlers from the promotion's Raw and SmackDown! brand divisions.

This was the first King of the Ring PPV and tournament held under the WWE name after the promotion had been renamed from World Wrestling Federation (WWF) to WWE the previous month. Although the tournament continued to be held periodically, with the next one occurring in 2006, this was the final King of the Ring event held until 2015, which was broadcast exclusively on WWE's streaming service, the WWE Network. In 2003, the King of the Ring's June PPV slot was replaced by Bad Blood. This would also be the final King of the Ring event broadcast on traditional PPV until 2024, which was rebranded as King and Queen of the Ring to incorporate the women's Queen of the Ring tournament that was established in 2021.

The main match from SmackDown! was a singles match for the WWE Undisputed Championship in which champion The Undertaker defeated Triple H to retain the title. The main match from Raw was a singles match in which Brock Lesnar defeated Rob Van Dam in the King of the Ring tournament final to win the 2002 tournament and earn a match for the WWE Undisputed Championship at SummerSlam. It was the only King of the Ring tournament to award a reward other than the title of "King of the Ring" until 2024 when a SummerSlam world title match became a permanent annual reward. The predominant match on the undercard was Kurt Angle versus Hollywood Hulk Hogan; the other matches on the undercard were Ric Flair versus Eddie Guerrero, a WWE Women's Championship match between champion Trish Stratus and challenger Molly Holly, and a SmackDown! WWE Cruiserweight Championship match between champion The Hurricane and challenger Jamie Noble.

== Production ==
=== Background ===
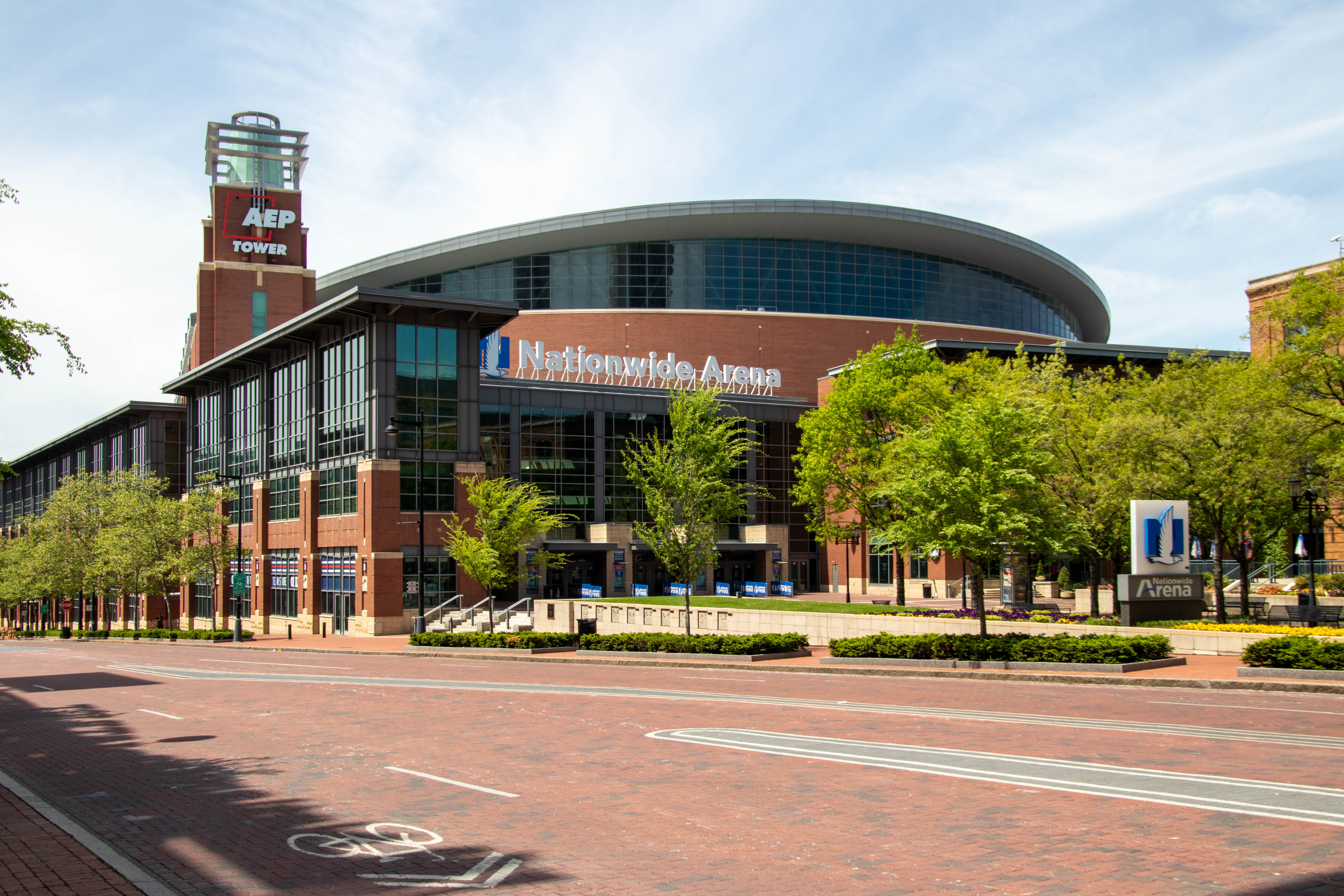
The event was held at the Nationwide Arena in Columbus, Ohio.

King of the Ring was a professional wrestling pay-per-view (PPV) event held annually in June by World Wrestling Entertainment (WWE) since 1993. The PPV was named after the King of the Ring tournament, a men's single-elimination tournament that was established in 1985 and held annually until 1991, except for 1990, with the winner crowned the "King of the Ring"; these early tournaments were held as special non-televised house shows. Unlike the non-televised events, the PPV did not feature all of the tournament's matches. Instead, several of the qualifying matches preceded the event with the final few matches then taking place at the pay-per-view. Other matches took place at the event as it was a traditional three-hour pay-per-view. The King of the Ring event became considered as one of WWE's "Big Five" PPVs, along with the Royal Rumble, WrestleMania, SummerSlam, and Survivor Series, the company's five biggest annual shows of the year.

The 10th King of the Ring PPV hosted the finals of the 16th tournament and it was held on June 23, 2002, at the Nationwide Arena in Columbus, Ohio. Previously, the only award for winning the King of the Ring tournament was being crowned the "King of the Ring". For the 2002 tournament, it was decided that the winner would also earn a match for the WWE Undisputed Championship at that year's SummerSlam.

The 2002 event was the first King of the Ring tournament and PPV held under the WWE name after the promotion was renamed from World Wrestling Federation (WWF) to WWE the previous month. It was also the first tournament and PPV held after the promotion introduced the brand extension in March, in which the roster was divided between the Raw and SmackDown! brands where wrestlers were exclusively assigned to perform. The 2002 tournament and PPV in turn featured wrestlers from both brands.

=== Storylines ===
King of the Ring featured professional wrestling matches that involved different wrestlers from pre-existing feuds, plots, and storylines that were played out on Raw and SmackDown! – WWE's television programs. All wrestlers were from WWE's Raw and SmackDown! brands – a storyline division in which WWE employees are assigned to a television program of the same name.

The main rivalry heading into the event was between The Undertaker and Triple H for the WWE Undisputed Championship. On the May 30 episode of SmackDown!, the storyline began when The Undertaker defeated Randy Orton to retain the title. Afterwards, Triple H assaulted The Undertaker, claiming that if The Undertaker would give him a title shot, he would not retain the title. Later that night, The Undertaker distracted Triple H and cost him a match against Test. After the match, The Undertaker hit Triple H with multiple chair shots targeting his arm with it. On the June 6 episode of SmackDown!, Triple H and Hollywood Hulk Hogan co-won a battle royal to determine the number one contender for the WWE Undisputed Championship at King of the Ring. SmackDown! owner Mr. McMahon booked Triple H and Hogan for a singles match, which was also a rematch from Backlash between the two. In that match, Triple H defeated Hogan to become the number one contender for the WWE Undisputed Championship at King of the Ring.

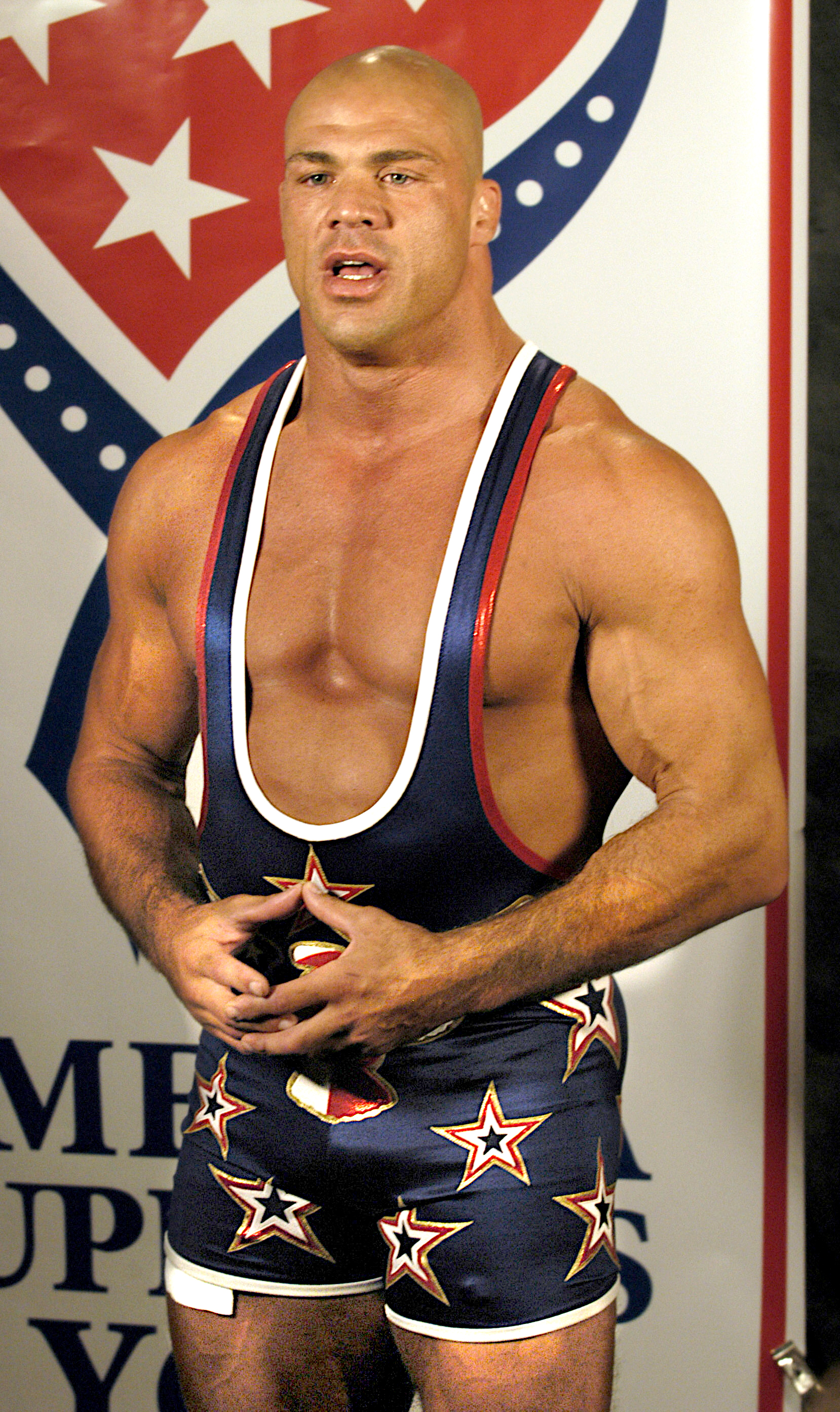
Kurt Angle wrestled Hollywood Hulk Hogan at King of the Ring

The predominant feud from the SmackDown! brand was between Kurt Angle and Hollywood Hulk Hogan. At Judgment Day, Angle got his head shaved bald after losing to Edge in a Hair vs. Hair match. Later that night, Hogan lost the WWE Undisputed Championship to The Undertaker due to interference from SmackDown! owner Mr. McMahon. On the May 23 episode of SmackDown!, Angle started wearing a hairpiece with a piece of amateur wrestling headgear after being shaven bald. On the May 30 episode of SmackDown!, Angle interrupted a staredown between Hogan and Mr. McMahon when he nailed Hogan with a steel pipe to the back of the head. Later that night, Hogan cost Angle a steel cage match against Edge. On the June 13 episode of SmackDown!, Hogan challenged Angle to a match at King of the Ring, which Angle accepted. Later that night, Angle and The Undertaker attacked Hogan before their tag team match against Hogan and Triple H. After Angle and The Undertaker defeated Triple H by disqualification, Hogan went after Angle and eventually stripped Angle's wig from his head.

The predominant feud from the Raw brand was between Ric Flair and Eddie Guerrero. For the previous two months, Flair had feuded with "Stone Cold" Steve Austin ever since the start of the brand extension where Austin was a free agent and signed with the Raw brand on the April 1 episode of Raw, following advice from Mr. McMahon and Flair. On the May 27 episode of Raw, Chris Benoit returned to WWE from a neck injury that he suffered the previous year at the King of the Ring event. Later that night, after Guerrero lost the Intercontinental Championship to Rob Van Dam in a ladder match, Guerrero knocked Van Dam over the top rope with the ladder. Moments later, Austin charged to the ring and attacked Guerrero along with Flair and Arn Anderson until Benoit got to the ring and assaulted Austin, enabling Guerrero to perform a frog splash on him. On the June 3 episode of Raw, Austin defeated Flair in a match where Flair became Austin's servant. If Flair would have won, Austin would have forever been on the bench. However, the feud ended abruptly with Austin's unexpected departure from the company on June 10 for his refusal to lose a hotshotted match to Brock Lesnar. That same night, Flair lost his half of WWE's ownership to McMahon and returned to active wrestling. On the June 17 episode of Raw, Flair gave a speech over losing the position of Raw owner to McMahon. The speech was interrupted by Guerrero and Benoit. Flair challenged Guerrero to a match at King of the Ring, which Guerrero accepted. Afterwards, both Guerrero and Benoit assaulted Flair, ending with Guerrero strapping Flair in Flair's own Figure-four leglock submission hold.

A secondary feud from the SmackDown! brand was between The Hurricane and Jamie Noble for the Cruiserweight Championship. On the June 6 episode of SmackDown!, Noble and his valet Nidia made their WWE debut by attacking The Hurricane in his locker room. The following week on SmackDown!, after The Hurricane lost to Test in a King of the Ring Qualifying match, Noble and Nidia made their way to the ring and took turns finishing The Hurricane off with a series of slaps before taking his mask. On the June 20 episode of SmackDown!, Noble defeated Billy Kidman to become the number one contender for The Hurricane's Cruiserweight Championship at King of the Ring. After the match, The Hurricane got his mask back after nailing Noble with a chokeslam.

A secondary feud from the Raw brand was between Trish Stratus and Molly Holly for the WWE Women's Championship. On the April 1 episode of Raw, after Stratus defeated Terri Runnels in a Paddle on a Pole match, Holly returned in a drastic attitude change and new look by nailing Stratus in the head with a paddle, breaking it into two. On the May 27 episode of Raw, Stratus and Spike Dudley defeated Holly and William Regal in a mixed tag team match. After the match, Holly attacked Stratus with Regal's brass knuckles. Holly would sneak attack Stratus on many occasions, leading to a title match between the two for Stratus' Women's Championship at King of the Ring.

==== Canceled match ====
"Stone Cold" Steve Austin was scheduled to face Eddie Guerrero at King of the Ring, as the two developed a storyline feud. However, Austin walked out and left the company prior to this event. Ric Flair was announced as a last-minute replacement for Austin in the match against Guerrero.

== Event ==
Other on-screen personnel
Role:	Name:
English commentators	Jim Ross
English commentators	Jerry Lawler
Spanish commentators	Carlos Cabrera
Spanish commentators	Hugo Savinovich
Interviewers	Mark Lloyd
Interviewers	Jonathan Coachman
Ring announcer	Howard Finkel
Break announcers	Michael Cole
Break announcers	Tazz
Referees	Mike Chioda
Referees	Charles Robinson
Referees	Brian Hebner
Referees	Earl Hebner
Referees	Chad Patton
Referees	Jim Korderas
Referees	Jack Doan

Before the event aired live on pay-per-view, The Hardy Boyz (Matt Hardy and Jeff Hardy) wrestled Raven and Steven Richards in a match that aired live on Sunday Night Heat. The Hardy Boyz won when Jeff pinned Richards after Raven turned on his partner.

=== Preliminary matches ===
The event began with the semifinal round of the King of the Ring tournament involving Rob Van Dam and Chris Jericho. The match went back and forth and both men earned momentum against each other. In the end, Jericho applied the Walls of Jericho on Van Dam, but the latter reached the ropes and executed a Five Star Frog Splash to advance to the final.

The second match of the semifinal was between Brock Lesnar and Test. Lesnar dominated most of the match until Test got control and attempted a pumphandle slam on Lesnar but Lesnar ducked the move. Test attempted a big boot, but Lesnar countered with the F-5 for the victory.

In the third match of the event, The Hurricane defended the WWE Cruiserweight Championship against Jamie Noble. The Hurricane dominated earlier part of the match until Noble got control. The Hurricane regained momentum and finished Noble and went for the pin, but Noble's valet Nidia distracted the referee. Noble took advantage and executed a powerbomb and attempted a pin. The Hurricane put his feet on the ropes, but Nidia knocked his feet and Noble won the title.

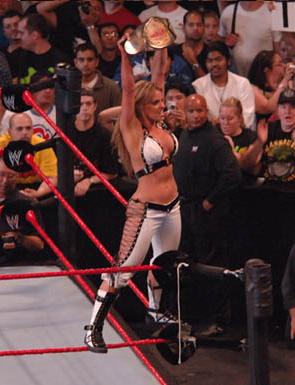
Trish Stratus defended the WWE Women's Championship against Molly Holly at King of the Ring

The fourth match pitted Eddie Guerrero against Ric Flair. Flair dominated the earlier part of the match until Guerrero attacked Flair's knee and kayfabe injured it. Guerrero worked on Flair's leg. During the match, Guerrero applied the Figure-four leglock on Flair. Guerrero continued to damage Flair's knee until Flair applied a figure-four leglock on Guerrero. Chris Benoit interfered in the match on Guerrero's behalf and distracted the referee. Guerrero began distracting the referee and Benoit applied a Crippler Crossface on Flair outside the ring. The referee noticed Benoit and ejected him from ringside. Bubba Ray Dudley interfered in the match and executed a Bubba Bomb on Guerrero. Flair pinned Guerrero to win the match.

In the fifth match, Trish Stratus defended the WWE Women's Championship against Molly Holly. Holly dominated most of the match, but Stratus got control and began using some of her signature moves on Holly. Holly regained the momentum and delivered a belly to belly suplex. Holly went on to pin Stratus while grabbing Stratus' tights to win the title.

The sixth match pitted Kurt Angle against Hollywood Hulk Hogan. Angle dominated most of the match by using his amateur wrestling style. Hogan used his power moves on Angle, but Angle countered with a series of suplexes. Angle delivered an Angle Slam for a near-fall. Hogan began dominating Angle and took off his wig to reveal Angle's bald head. Angle applied an ankle lock on Hogan and forced Hogan to submit to win the match.

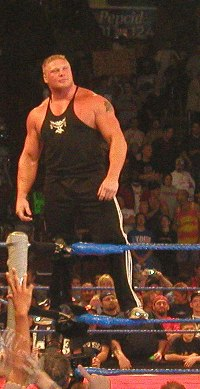
Brock Lesnar won the 2002 King of the Ring tournament

The seventh match was the final round match of the King of the Ring tournament between Brock Lesnar and Rob Van Dam. Lesnar dominated Van Dam for most of the match with his power moves. Van Dam got control of Lesnar and used a series of kicks and a Rolling Thunder on Lesnar. Van Dam flew off the ropes, but Lesnar caught him on his shoulders and delivered an F-5 to win the King of the Ring tournament and earned a WWE Undisputed Championship match at SummerSlam.

=== Main event match ===
The main event match was for the WWE Undisputed Championship. The Undertaker defended the title against Triple H. The match went back and forth until Triple H dominated The Undertaker. The Undertaker earned the momentum over Triple H until Triple H tried a Pedigree but The Undertaker countered the move and pushed Triple H into the referee. The referee was knocked out, and The Undertaker and Triple H knocked out each other. The Rock entered the arena and replaced Paul Heyman for commentary. The Undertaker attacked The Rock, causing The Rock to interfere in the match and attack The Undertaker. The Rock tried to hit The Undertaker with a chair but The Undertaker ducked and Triple H was hit with the chair. The Undertaker executed a Last Ride for a near-fall. The Rock executed a Rock Bottom on The Undertaker and Triple H performed a Pedigree on The Undertaker and tried to pin The Undertaker, but the referee was still groggy. The Undertaker hit Triple H with a low blow and pinned Triple H with a roll-up to retain the title. After the match, The Rock performed the People's Elbow on The Undertaker but Triple H performed a Pedigree on The Rock and The Undertaker performed a chokeslam on Triple H, ending the show.

== Aftermath ==
The Rock's involvement in the WWE Undisputed Championship match at King of the Ring made him the number one contender for the WWE Undisputed Championship at Vengeance. On the July 4 episode of SmackDown!, The Undertaker retained the title against Kurt Angle in a controversial fashion as The Undertaker pinned Angle and Angle made The Undertaker tap out at the same time. As a result, Angle was added to the title match, making it a triple threat match. At Vengeance, The Rock defeated Angle and The Undertaker in a triple threat match for his seventh WWE Undisputed Championship.

Due to defeating the Intercontinental Champion Rob Van Dam in the final of the King of the Ring tournament, Brock Lesnar feuded with Van Dam over the Intercontinental Championship. At Vengeance, Van Dam defeated Lesnar by disqualification to retain the title. After Vengeance, Lesnar joined the SmackDown! brand and began feuding with the WWE Undisputed Champion The Rock as he had won the King of the Ring tournament and earned the right to challenge for the WWE Undisputed Championship at SummerSlam. At SummerSlam, Lesnar defeated The Rock for the WWE Undisputed Championship, and became the youngest champion in the title's history.

The 2002 King of the Ring event would be the final King of the Ring to air on traditional PPV until 2024; Bad Blood replaced the event as the June PPV in 2003. WrestleMania, SummerSlam, Survivor Series, and Royal Rumble in turn reverted to being referred to as the "Big Four" until August 2021 when Money in the Bank was elevated to "Big Five" status. Although the promotion ceased producing King of the Ring as a PPV after the 2002 event, WWE continued to periodically hold the tournament across their weekly television programs, Raw and SmackDown, with the finals instead taking place on an episode of Raw or at another PPV, such as Judgment Day for the next tournament in 2006. The 2015 tournament then aired exclusively as a livestreaming event on WWE's online streaming service, the WWE Network, which launched in February 2014. After another nine years, another King of the Ring event was scheduled for 2024, rebranded as King and Queen of the Ring, incorporating the women's Queen of the Ring tournament that was established in 2021, returning the event to traditional PPV as well as livestreaming. The 2024 event was also the first time since 2002 that the tournament awarded a world championship match at SummerSlam, subsequently becoming the annual award for the tournament. The 2024 event would be the last dedicated event, as subsequent tournaments have concluded at the annual Night of Champions event.

== Results ==
No.	Results	Stipulations	Times
1^{H}	The Hardy Boyz (Jeff Hardy and Matt Hardy) defeated Raven and Steven Richards by pinfall	Tag team match	6:02
2	Rob Van Dam defeated Chris Jericho by pinfall	King of the Ring semifinal match	14:31
3	Brock Lesnar (with Paul Heyman) defeated Test by pinfall	King of the Ring semifinal match	8:12
4	Jamie Noble (with Nidia) defeated The Hurricane (c) by pinfall	Singles match for the WWE Cruiserweight Championship	11:58
5	Ric Flair defeated Eddie Guerrero by pinfall	Singles match (Note: Flair was a last-minute replacement for "Stone Cold" Steve Austin, who walked out on the company prior to this event due to a dispute with the creative team.)	17:00
6	Molly Holly defeated Trish Stratus (c) by pinfall	Singles match for the WWE Women's Championship	5:40
7	Kurt Angle defeated Hollywood Hulk Hogan by submission	Singles match	12:09
8	Brock Lesnar (with Paul Heyman) defeated Rob Van Dam by pinfall	King of the Ring final match for a WWE Undisputed Championship match at SummerSlam	5:43
9	The Undertaker (c) defeated Triple H by pinfall	Singles match for the WWE Undisputed Championship	23:00
(c) / – the champion(s) heading into the match; H / – the match was broadcast prior to the pay-per-view on Sunday Night Heat

=== Tournament brackets ===
The tournament took place between June 3 and June 23, 2002. The tournament brackets were as follows:

First round (TV)
Raw	Brock Lesnar	Pin
Raw	Bubba Ray Dudley	4:50
Raw	Booker T	Pin
Raw	William Regal	3:26
SmackDown!	Hardcore Holly	Pin
SmackDown!	Tajiri	3:40
SmackDown!	The Hurricane	1:52
SmackDown!	Test	Pin
SmackDown!	Chris Jericho	Forf^{1}
SmackDown!	Edge	N/A
SmackDown!	Christian	3:23
SmackDown!	The Big Valbowski	Pin
Raw	X-Pac	Pin
Raw	Goldust	3:27
Raw	Eddie Guerrero	9:42
Raw	Rob Van Dam	Pin

Quarterfinals (TV)
Raw	Brock Lesnar	Pin
Raw	Booker T	3:23
SmackDown!	Hardcore Holly	3:10
SmackDown!	Test	Pin
SmackDown!	Chris Jericho	Sub
SmackDown!	The Big Valbowski	4:31
Raw	X-Pac	6:00
Raw	Rob Van Dam	Pin

Semifinals (PPV)
Raw	Brock Lesnar	Pin
SmackDown!	Test	8:12
SmackDown!	Chris Jericho	14:31
Raw	Rob Van Dam	Pin

Final (PPV)
Raw	Brock Lesnar	Pin
Raw	Rob Van Dam	5:36

1. Edge forfeited his match to Chris Jericho due to a legitimate shoulder injury.
