= WWE Judgment Day (2006) =

World Wrestling Entertainment pay-per-view event

Judgment Day
- Promotional poster featuring a crow and a noose
- Promotion: World Wrestling Entertainment
- Brand: SmackDown!
- Date: May 21, 2006
- City: Phoenix, Arizona
- Venue: US Airways Center
- Attendance: 14,000
- Buy rate: 252,000

Pay-per-view chronology
| ← Previous; Backlash | Next → ECW One Night Stand |

Judgment Day chronology
| ← Previous; 2005 | Next → 2007 |

The 2006 Judgment Day was a professional wrestling pay-per-view (PPV) event produced by World Wrestling Entertainment (WWE). It was the eighth Judgment Day and took place on May 21, 2006, at the US Airways Center in Phoenix, Arizona, held exclusively for wrestlers from the promotion's SmackDown! brand division. It was the final Judgment Day to be brand-exclusive as following WrestleMania 23 the following year, brand-exclusive PPVs were discontinued. The event also featured the finals of the 2006 King of the Ring tournament, which was the first tournament held since 2002.

In the main event, Rey Mysterio defeated John "Bradshaw" Layfield (JBL) following a Frog splash to retain the World Championship. One of the predominant matches on the undercard was Booker T versus Bobby Lashley in the finals of the King of the Ring tournament, which Booker won after interference from Finlay. Another primary match was Kurt Angle versus Mark Henry, which Henry won after Angle was counted out.

== Production ==
=== Background ===
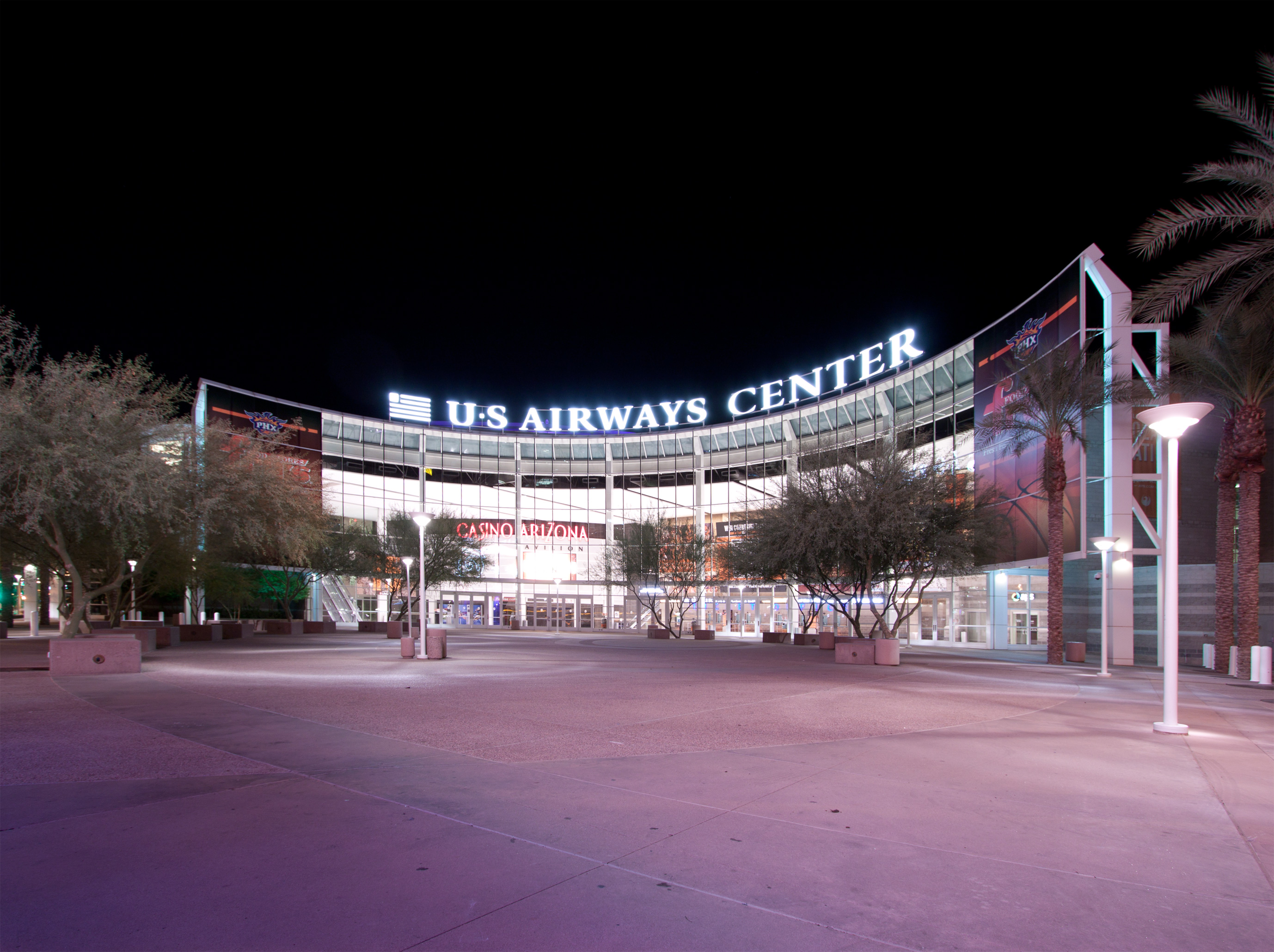
The eighth Judgment Day was held at the US Airways Center in Phoenix, Arizona.

Judgment Day was a professional wrestling pay-per-view (PPV) event first held by World Wrestling Entertainment (WWE) as the 25th In Your House PPV event in October 1998. Following the discontinuation of the In Your House series in February 1999, Judgment Day was reinstated in May 2000 as its own PPV event, establishing Judgment Day as the promotion's annual May PPV. The eighth event was held on May 21, 2006, at the US Airways Center in Phoenix, Arizona. Like the previous two years's events, it featured wrestlers exclusively from the SmackDown! brand.

=== Storylines ===
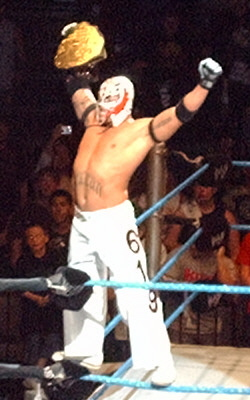
Rey Mysterio as World Champion

The main feud heading into Judgment Day involved Rey Mysterio and John "Bradshaw" Layfield (JBL) with the two battling over the World Championship. On the May 5 episode of SmackDown!, after Mysterio expressed his feelings about being World Champion, JBL came out and declared himself the number-one contender. JBL immediately began degrading Mysterio because of his Mexican heritage, saying he was an illegal immigrant and that Mysterio did not deserve to be champion. Mysterio reacted by saying that he would fight anyone at any time. In turn, JBL announced that Mysterio would face off against Mark Henry later that night. During the match, Mysterio tried to use his quickness to avoid Henry, but was easily countered by Henry's power. Mysterio was able to hit a 619 and a Seated senton, but was defeated when Henry hit the World's Strongest Slam for the pin. The next week on SmackDown!, JBL announced that Mysterio would take on The Great Khali later that night. During the match, Mysterio attempted a springboard dropkick, but it had no effect. Khali then picked up Mysterio and performed a Two-handed chokeslam for the win. On the May 19 episode of SmackDown!, JBL said that Mysterio did not look so well due to the beatings he endured in past weeks and that he probably did not even know what day it was. Mysterio answered and told him the day, May 19. Kane, who in recent weeks attacked anyone who said May 19, came out and faced off against Mysterio. Kane dominated most of the match, hitting a variety of power moves. Kane then began to hear voices in his head saying May 19, which caused him to go into a psychotic trance. JBL told him to finish the job, but mistakenly said May 19, causing Kane to attack him. As a result, the match ended in a no-contest.

The other main match on the card was Booker T versus Bobby Lashley in the finals of the 2006 King of the Ring tournament. The tournament, which was exclusive to SmackDown! wrestlers, was first announced by SmackDown! General Manager Theodore Long on the April 7 episode of SmackDown!, which was the first King of the Ring tournament held since 2002. He announced the participants and that the first match, Kurt Angle versus Randy Orton, would take place next week. In this match, Angle won after, in storyline, breaking Orton's ankle by refusing to break his Ankle Lock. The second qualifying match was between Booker and Matt Hardy on April 21. Booker won the match after a low blow while his valet, Sharmell, had the referee distracted. The third qualifying match was Lashley versus Mark Henry. Lashley won by countout after Henry was knocked to the outside of the ring. The final first round match was Finlay versus Chris Benoit, which Finlay won after a chair-shot and a Celtic Cross. The semi-final round took place on May 12, with Finlay taking on Lashley, and Booker versus Angle. Lashley won his match with a Spear, however, Angle was unable to compete in his match and had to forfeit, meaning Booker also qualified for the final. Angle was unable to compete due to the injuries to his ribs that he sustained after being attacked by Henry. This happened after Henry was eliminated from the King Of The Ring tournament, that same night, by Lashley. Two weeks later, Angle demanded a match against Henry from SmackDown! General Manager Long, but Long refused to let Angle compete that night. Instead, he booked the match for Judgment Day. Also as a result of the King Of the Ring tournament, a Chris Benoit vs Finlay match was set up.

The third match on the card was The Undertaker versus The Great Khali. This feud began when Khali attacked The Undertaker at the beginning of April. After the attack, the Undertaker didn't appear on television again until Judgment Day, leading Khali's manager, Daivari, to proclaim that Khali was "the real phenomenon". Over the next few weeks, Khali and Daivari continued to proclaim that Khali was better than the Undertaker, however, on May 5, General Manager Long told Khali and Daivari that the Undertaker had challenged Khali to a match at Judgment Day. Later that night, Khali accepted the challenge.

== Event ==
Other on-screen personnel
| Role: | Name: |
|---|---|
| English commentators | Michael Cole |
| English commentators | Tazz |
| Spanish commentators | Carlos Cabrera |
| Spanish commentators | Hugo Savinovich |
| Interviewer | Kristal Marshall |
| Ring announcer | Tony Chimel |
| General manager | Theodore Long |
| Referees | Jimmy Korderas |
| Referees | Chris Kay |
| Referees | Nick Patrick |
| Referees | Charles Robinson |

Before the event went live on pay-per-view, Matt Hardy defeated Simon Dean in a dark match.

=== Preliminary matches ===
The first match that aired on pay-per-view was the WWE Tag Team Championship match between MNM (Johnny Nitro, Joey Mercury, and their manager, Melina) and their challengers Paul London and Brian Kendrick. After a largely back and forth match, Mercury accidentally ran into Nitro, who hit Melina on the outside. This distracted Mercury, allowing London to sunset flip Mercury into a Jackknife pin for the victory and the Tag Team titles. After the match, Nitro and Melina attacked Mercury.

The second match was between Chris Benoit and Finlay. Benoit took advantage after three German suplexes, but missed a diving headbutt, allowing Finlay to gain control. After the Three Amigos, however, Benoit applied the Crippler Crossface, and Finlay submitted, giving Benoit the win.

The third match was between Melina and Jillian Hall. Melina controlled the early stages of the match, until Hall was able to pin her with a sunset flip, even though Melina's hand was on the bottom rope.

The next match was the Cruiserweight Championship match between the champion, Gregory Helms, and Super Crazy. In a high-flying match, including a suicide senton by Crazy, Crazy took control about half-way through the match. Helms countered, however, and after a powerbomb, Helms pinned Crazy to retain the title by using the ropes for leverage. After the match, Melina and Nitro ran into Theodore Long's office complaining about the finish. Melina slapped Long. Long says, "Melina, I needed that. Now I'm gonna tell you what I'm going to do about it." Enraged, he fires Melina and Johnny Nitro from Smackdown.

The fifth match was between Kurt Angle and Mark Henry. Angle, who had his ribs taped, lost the match by countout after Henry tackled him against the ringpost on the outside. After the match, Angle attacked Henry with a steel chair and applied the ankle lock on Henry. He then attacked Henry with an Angle Slam onto an announce table and proceeded to strike him in the face with the chair, sending Henry through an announce table.

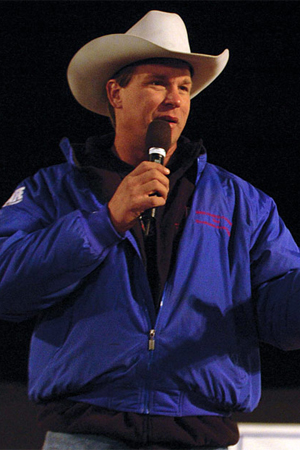
John "Bradshaw" Layfield faced Rey Mysterio for the World Championship.

In the sixth match, Booker T faced Bobby Lashley in the King of the Ring final. Lashley took control early on in the match, until he hit the ringpost with a shoulder block attempt. This allowed Booker T to take control, although Lashley quickly countered with a belly to belly suplex. Before he could capitalize, however, Booker T's valet, Sharmell, distracted Lashley. After some more back and forth offense, Sharmell caused another distraction, allowing Booker T's associate Finlay to hit Lashley with a shillelagh. Booker T then pinned him to win the tournament after a scissors kick. Lashley was outraged, however, and speared Booker T through a throne to gain some revenge.

The next match was between The Undertaker and The Great Khali. Khali dominated the match for large periods, although The Undertaker did manage to execute his signature Old School. After The Undertaker failed to execute a chokeslam, Khali took control again, and pinned The Undertaker following a big boot.

=== Main event ===
In the main event, Rey Mysterio defended the World Championship against John "Bradshaw" Layfield (JBL). After the beginning went back and forth, JBL took control after he threw Mysterio into the steel steps on the outside. After continued offense from JBL, Mysterio fought back, but when Mysterio went for a West Coast Pop, JBL avoided by pulling referee Nick Patrick in front of him. A second referee, Charles Robinson, replaced Patrick, but after Mysterio kicked out of a JBL Bomb, JBL attacked Robinson. JBL then brought a steel chair into the ring, but Mysterio dropkicked it back into his face. Mysterio followed it up with a 619 and frog splash to pin JBL and retain his championship.

== Aftermath ==
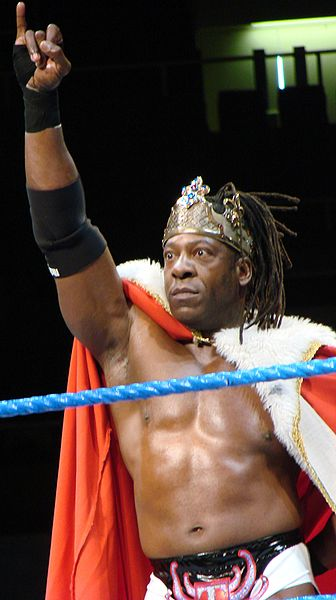
Booker T became King Booker after his King of the Ring coronation.

On the following episode of SmackDown!, the King of the Ring coronation ceremony took place. Booker T was crowned by William Regal, and he became known as King Booker. King Booker also announced his wife, Sharmell as his Queen. Booker eventually built up a Court, with "Sir William Regal" and "Sir Finlay" joining. King Booker also continued his feud with Bobby Lashley, until they finally had their blow-off match inside a steel cage. King Booker went on to become the number one contender to the World Championship, while Finlay and Regal continued the Court's feud with Lashley.

WWE also announced the launch of the ECW brand, a relaunch of the former Extreme Championship Wrestling (ECW) promotion. Former ECW owner Paul Heyman was placed in charge of the new brand, and given two draft picks to bolster his roster. His only SmackDown! pick was Kurt Angle who wrestled his last match on SmackDown! on June 2. Angle went on to wrestle the returning Randy Orton at ECW One Night Stand, after storyline breaking his ankle in April. Orton tapped out to lose the match.

On the following episode of SmackDown!, Rey Mysterio again defeated John "Bradshaw" Layfield (JBL) to retain the World Championship, forcing JBL to retire from wrestling. JBL, however, returned as the new SmackDown! Color commentator on June 16. Mysterio was then challenged to a match at ECW One Night Stand, for the World Championship by Sabu, repeatedly leading up to the match. At ECW One Night Stand, the match ended in a no contest, after it was ruled that neither Sabu or Mysterio could continue after Sabu used a DDT to drive Mysterio and himself through a table. As a result, Mysterio retained the title.

The Great Khali and The Undertaker continued to feud, with Khali challenging the Undertaker to a Punjabi Prison match at The Great American Bash. The Undertaker accepted the match the following week, sending a message over the speakers, and interrupting a segment where Daivari and Khali were mocking him. The Undertaker made his first appearance on SmackDown!, since Judgment Day, the following week to send a message to Khali. Before the match at the Great American Bash, however, Khali was replaced with the Big Show, due to a problem with his liver. Khali and the Undertaker feuded for the rest of the summer, finally completing their feud just before SummerSlam.

The 2006 Judgment Day would be the final brand-exclusive Judgment Day, as following WrestleMania 23 the following year, brand-exclusive pay-per-views were discontinued.

== Results ==
| No. | Results | Stipulations | Times |
|---|---|---|---|
| 1^{D} | Matt Hardy defeated Simon Dean by pinfall | Singles match | — |
| 2 | Brian Kendrick and Paul London defeated MNM (Joey Mercury and Johnny Nitro) (c) (with Melina) by pinfall | Tag team match for the WWE Tag Team Championship | 13:42 |
| 3 | Chris Benoit defeated Finlay by submission | Singles match | 21:10 |
| 4 | Jillian Hall defeated Melina by pinfall | Singles match | 4:18 |
| 5 | Gregory Helms (c) defeated Super Crazy by pinfall | Singles match for the WWE Cruiserweight Championship | 9:56 |
| 6 | Mark Henry defeated Kurt Angle by countout | Singles match | 9:11 |
| 7 | Booker T (with Sharmell) defeated Bobby Lashley by pinfall | 2006 King of the Ring Final | 9:15 |
| 8 | The Great Khali (with Daivari) defeated The Undertaker by pinfall | Singles match | 8:31 |
| 9 | Rey Mysterio (c) defeated John "Bradshaw" Layfield by pinfall | Singles match for the World Championship | 16:01 |
(c) / – the champion(s) heading into the match; D / – this was a dark match
