= King of the Ring =

WWE pay-per-view and livestreaming event series

King and Queen of the Ring
- WWE King and Queen of the Ring 2024 logo
- Promotions: WWE
- Brands: Raw (2002, 2024); SmackDown (2002, 2024)
- First event: 1993
- Last event: 2025

King and Queen of the Ring, formerly and still commonly known as simply King of the Ring, was a professional wrestling event produced by WWE. The event was established in 1993 and originally centered on the men's King of the Ring tournament, which had been established in 1985, but beginning in 2024, also the women's Queen of the Ring tournament, which was established in 2021 and originally known as the Queen's Crown tournament.

The King of the Ring event was originally established in 1993 and was held annually in June as a pay-per-view (PPV) event. During the event's original run as a PPV, it was considered one of the promotion's five biggest events of the year, along with the Royal Rumble, WrestleMania, SummerSlam, and Survivor Series, dubbed the "Big Five". The 2002 event was the final King of the Ring produced as a PPV. To coincide with the brand extension introduced earlier that same year, the 2002 event featured wrestlers from both the Raw and SmackDown brand divisions. In 2003, the event's PPV slot was replaced by Bad Blood.

The tournament endured a four-year hiatus until its return in 2006 as an exclusive tournament for wrestlers of the SmackDown brand. Instead of a dedicated PPV, however, this tournament concluded at that year's Judgment Day. While subsequent tournaments were periodically held as a non-PPV event and included WWE's other brands, the conclusion to the 2015 tournament was held exclusively as a livestreaming event on the WWE Network and also occurred when a brand extension was not in effect; the brand split was then reintroduced in 2016. While the tournaments continued to be held periodically, the event itself was to be revived in May 2023 and rebranded as "King and Queen of the Ring" to incorporate the women's tournament; however, these plans were scrapped as WWE instead held a revived Night of Champions. The rebranded "King and Queen of the Ring" event that was intended for 2023 was rescheduled for May 2024 in Jeddah, Saudi Arabia. This was the first King of the Ring event since 2015, the first to air on traditional PPV since 2002, the first held outside of the United States, as well as the first dedicated event for the women's tournament, which was renamed to Queen of the Ring for its 2024 return. The event would again be put on hiatus as the finals of both tournaments have since been held annually at Night of Champions.

== History ==
The King of the Ring tournament is a men's single-elimination tournament in which the winner is crowned the "King of the Ring". The tournament was established in 1985 by the then-World Wrestling Federation (WWF) and was held annually until 1991, with the exception of 1990. These early tournaments were held as special non-televised house shows in an effort to boost attendance at these events.

In 1993, the WWF began to produce an annual June pay-per-view (PPV) event titled King of the Ring. The inaugural PPV took place on June 13, 1993, at the Nutter Center in Dayton, Ohio. Unlike the previous non-televised events, the PPV did not feature all of the tournament's matches. Instead, several of the qualifying matches preceded the event with the final few matches then taking place at the pay-per-view. There were also other matches that took place at the event as it was a traditional three-hour pay-per-view. The King of the Ring event was considered one of the promotion's "Big Five" PPVs of the year, along with the Royal Rumble, WrestleMania, SummerSlam, and Survivor Series, up until its disestablishment after the 2002 event—it was the only event of the five to never be hosted at least once at Madison Square Garden. In 2003, the event's PPV slot was replaced by Bad Blood.

In early 2002, the WWF was renamed World Wrestling Entertainment (WWE) following a lawsuit from the World Wildlife Fund over the "WWF" initialism. Also around this time, the promotion introduced the brand extension, in which the roster was divided between the Raw and SmackDown! brands where wrestlers were exclusively assigned to perform. The 2002 tournament and PPV was in turn held for wrestlers from both brands.

After a four-year hiatus, the tournament returned in 2006 and was held exclusively for wrestlers from the SmackDown! brand. Unlike the previous years, however, there was not an associated pay-per-view. Instead, tournament matches took place across episodes of SmackDown! with the finale being held at Judgment Day. While WWE continued to periodically hold the tournament across their other programs, the semifinals and final of the 2015 tournament aired exclusively as an event on WWE's online streaming service, the WWE Network, which launched in February 2014. This 2015 tournament also occurred when the brand extension was not in effect; the brand split was reinstated in 2016.

In October 2022, Dave Meltzer of the Wrestling Observer Newsletter reported that WWE was planning to resurrect the King of the Ring event in 2023 to replace the Hell in a Cell event. This was officially confirmed by WWE on March 6, 2023, with the company announcing that the event would be rebranded as "King and Queen of the Ring" to incorporate the women's Queen's Crown tournament that was established in 2021. This would have seen the event's return to PPV, in addition to airing on WWE's livestreaming platforms. It was scheduled for May 27, 2023, and would have been the ninth event that WWE held in Saudi Arabia in support of Saudi Vision 2030. However, on April 13, it was revealed that WWE decided to scrap the revival and would instead hold Night of Champions, thus reviving the Night of Champions event. According to Mike Johnson of PWInsider, the decision to change the event to Night of Champions was a creative choice to revive and bring that event to an international market. Fightful later reported that WWE did not have plans to reschedule King and Queen of the Ring for later that year, but the event could possibly be used for a future Saudi show. In April 2024, WWE announced that they would hold the King and Queen of the Ring event in Saudi Arabia in May 2024, thus being the 11th event in the Saudi Arabian partnership. The women's tournament was also renamed as Queen of the Ring, with this also being the first dedicated event for the women's tournament.

The event would be put on hiatus again as the 2025 tournaments were scheduled to culminate at the Night of Champions event, which was again the case for 2026.

== Events ==
#	Event	Date	City	Venue	Main event	Ref.
1	King of the Ring (1993)	June 13, 1993	Dayton, Ohio	Nutter Center	Bret Hart vs. Bam Bam Bigelow in the 1993 King of the Ring tournament final	
2	King of the Ring (1994)	June 19, 1994	Baltimore, Maryland	Baltimore Arena	Jerry Lawler vs. Roddy Piper	
3	King of the Ring (1995)	June 25, 1995	Philadelphia, Pennsylvania	The Spectrum	Sycho Sid and Tatanka vs. Diesel and Bam Bam Bigelow	
4	King of the Ring (1996)	June 23, 1996	Milwaukee, Wisconsin	Wisconsin Center Arena	Shawn Michaels (c) vs. The British Bulldog for the WWF Championship with Mr. Perfect as the special guest enforcer	
5	King of the Ring (1997)	June 8, 1997	Providence, Rhode Island	Providence Civic Center	The Undertaker (c) vs. Faarooq for the WWF Championship	
6	King of the Ring (1998)	June 28, 1998	Pittsburgh, Pennsylvania	Pittsburgh Civic Arena	"Stone Cold" Steve Austin (c) vs. Kane in a First Blood match for the WWF Championship	
7	King of the Ring (1999)	June 27, 1999	Greensboro, North Carolina	Greensboro Coliseum	Vince McMahon and Shane McMahon vs. "Stone Cold" Steve Austin in a 2-on-1 Handicap Ladder match for control of the World Wrestling Federation	
8	King of the Ring (2000)	June 25, 2000	Boston, Massachusetts	Fleet Center	The McMahon-Helmsley Faction (Triple H (c), Shane McMahon, and Vince McMahon) vs. The Rock, Kane, and The Undertaker for the WWF Championship where if Triple H, Shane, or Vince was pinned or submitted, Triple H would lose his title to whoever scored the fall	
9	King of the Ring (2001)	June 24, 2001	East Rutherford, New Jersey	Continental Airlines Arena	"Stone Cold" Steve Austin (c) vs. Chris Jericho vs. Chris Benoit in a triple threat match for the WWF Championship	
10	King of the Ring (2002)	June 23, 2002	Columbus, Ohio	Nationwide Arena	The Undertaker (c) vs. Triple H for the WWE Undisputed Championship	
11	King of the Ring (2015)	April 28, 2015	Moline, Illinois	iWireless Center	Bad News Barrett vs. Neville in the 2015 King of the Ring tournament final	
12	King and Queen of the Ring (2024)	May 25, 2024	Jeddah, Saudi Arabia	Jeddah Super Dome	Cody Rhodes (c) vs. Logan Paul for the Undisputed WWE Championship	
(c) – refers to the champion(s) heading into the match
