= SmackDown (WWE brand) =

Professional wrestling roster division, referred to as brands, in WWE

- Logo for the brand and the WWE SmackDown television program since September 13, 2024
- Product type: Professional wrestling Sports entertainment
- Current owner: WWE
- Produced by: Paul "Triple H" Levesque; Lee Fitting
- Country: United States
- Introduced: March 25, 2002 (first split); July 19, 2016 (second split)
- Discontinued: August 29, 2011 (first split)
- Related brands: Raw; NXT
- General Manager; Nick Aldis Predecessor: World Championship Wrestling (See: Aftermath of The Invasion)

SmackDown is a brand of the American professional wrestling promotion WWE that was established on March 25, 2002. Brands are divisions of WWE's roster where wrestlers are assigned to perform on a weekly basis when a brand extension is in effect. Wrestlers assigned to SmackDown primarily appear on the brand's weekly television program, Friday Night SmackDown, also referred to simply as SmackDown. It is one of WWE's two main brands, along with Raw, which were formed in 2002 after WWE absorbed WCW. Raw and SmackDown are collectively referred to as WWE's main roster. The brand extension was discontinued between August 2011 and July 2016.

In addition to the television program, SmackDown wrestlers also perform on the branded and co-branded pay-per-view and livestreaming events as well as the quarterly Saturday Night's Main Event special. The brand's wrestlers also appears in their sister promotion, Lucha Libre AAA Worldwide (AAA), which WWE acquired in 2025. During the first brand split (2002–2011), SmackDown wrestlers also competed on an exclusive supplementary show, Velocity, and on ECW under a talent exchange program with the former ECW brand, while during the second brand split (2016–present), the brand's wrestlers have appeared in the interbrand Mixed Match Challenge, Worlds Collide, and annual Tribute to the Troops events.

== History ==
=== First split (2002–2011) ===
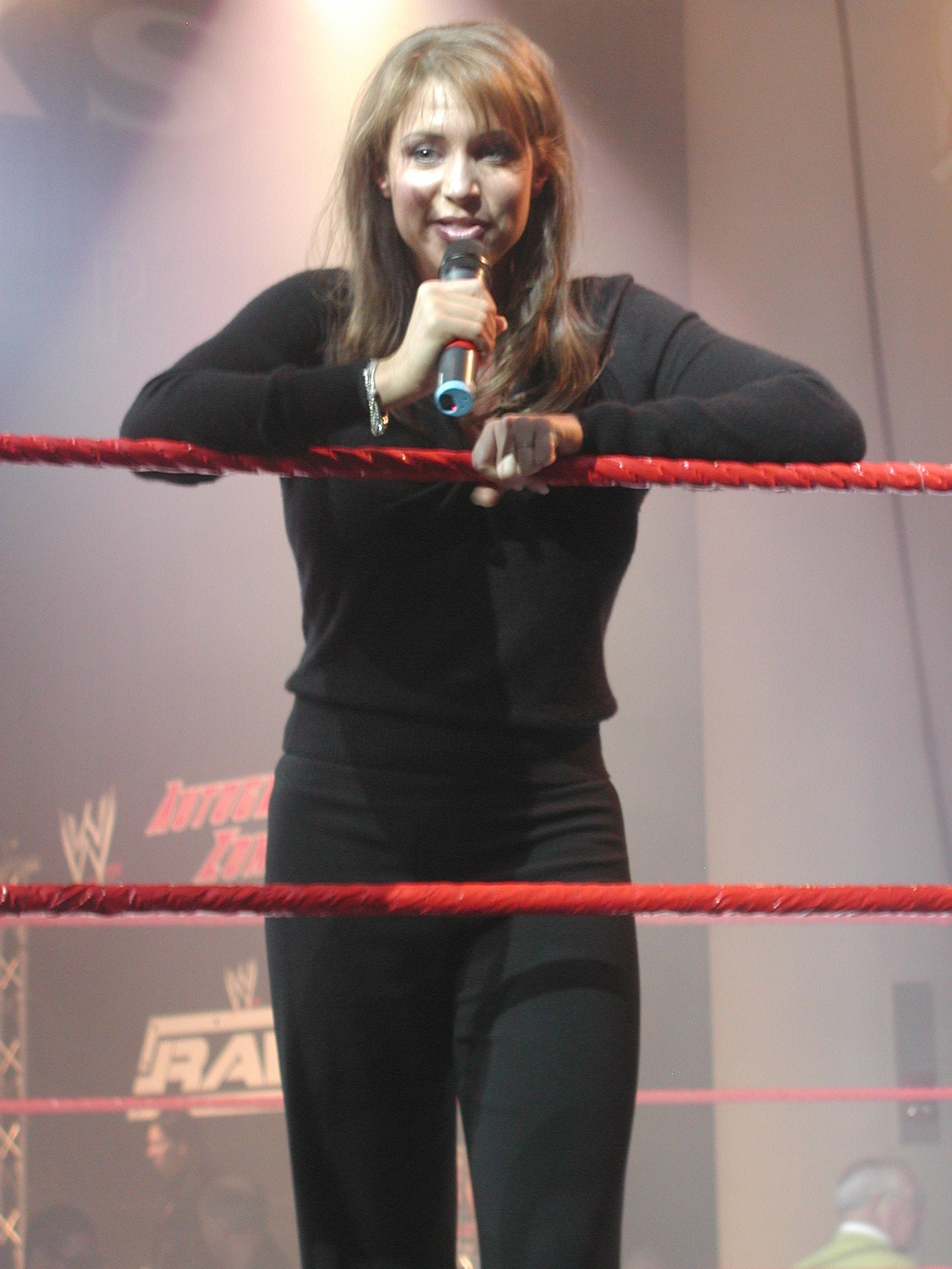
Stephanie McMahon was the first SmackDown General Manager.

In its conception, according to Bruce Prichard in his Something to Wrestle podcast released in October 2018, the then World Wrestling Federation (WWF) originally planned to make SmackDown! an all-women's brand but ultimately decided against it because of the lack of talent.

In March 2002, WWF underwent the "brand extension", a process in which WWF divided itself into two branches with separate rosters, storylines and authority figures. The two divisions, hosted by and named after Raw and SmackDown!, would compete against each other. The split resulted from WWF purchasing its two biggest competitors, World Championship Wrestling (WCW) and Extreme Championship Wrestling (ECW); and the subsequent doubling of its roster and championships. The brand extension was made public during a telecast of Raw on March 18, initiated with the first draft a week later on the March 25 episode of Raw and became official on the April 1 episode of Raw.

Wrestlers began to wrestle exclusively for their specific show. At the time, this excluded the WWF Undisputed Championship and WWF Women's Championship as those titles would be defended on both shows. In August 2002, then WWE Undisputed Champion, Brock Lesnar, refused to defend the title on Raw, in effect causing his title to become exclusive to SmackDown!. The following week on Raw, Raw General Manager Eric Bischoff awarded a newly instated World Heavyweight Championship to Raw's designated number one contender Triple H. Accordingly, Lesnar's championship was no longer deemed "undisputed". Following this, the WWE Women's Championship soon became a Raw exclusive as well. As a result of the brand extension, an annual "draft lottery" was instituted to exchange members of each roster and generally refresh the lineups.

SmackDown! was the home brand for many top WWE stars including Eddie Guerrero, Chris Benoit, Batista, Brock Lesnar, Big Show, John "Bradshaw" Layfield (JBL), Booker T, Kurt Angle, Edge, The Undertaker, Rey Mysterio, John Cena, Mark Henry, The Miz, CM Punk, The Bella Twins, Michelle McCool and Torrie Wilson. Guerrero would go on to become the WWE Champion as part of the show, thus becoming the main feature of SmackDown! throughout 2004 and the most popular wrestler of that year. The biggest star of the next decade, John Cena, started his WWE career on this brand and rose to stardom as "Doctor of Thuganomics" on the show, eventually winning his first WWE Championship during his tenure on the brand.

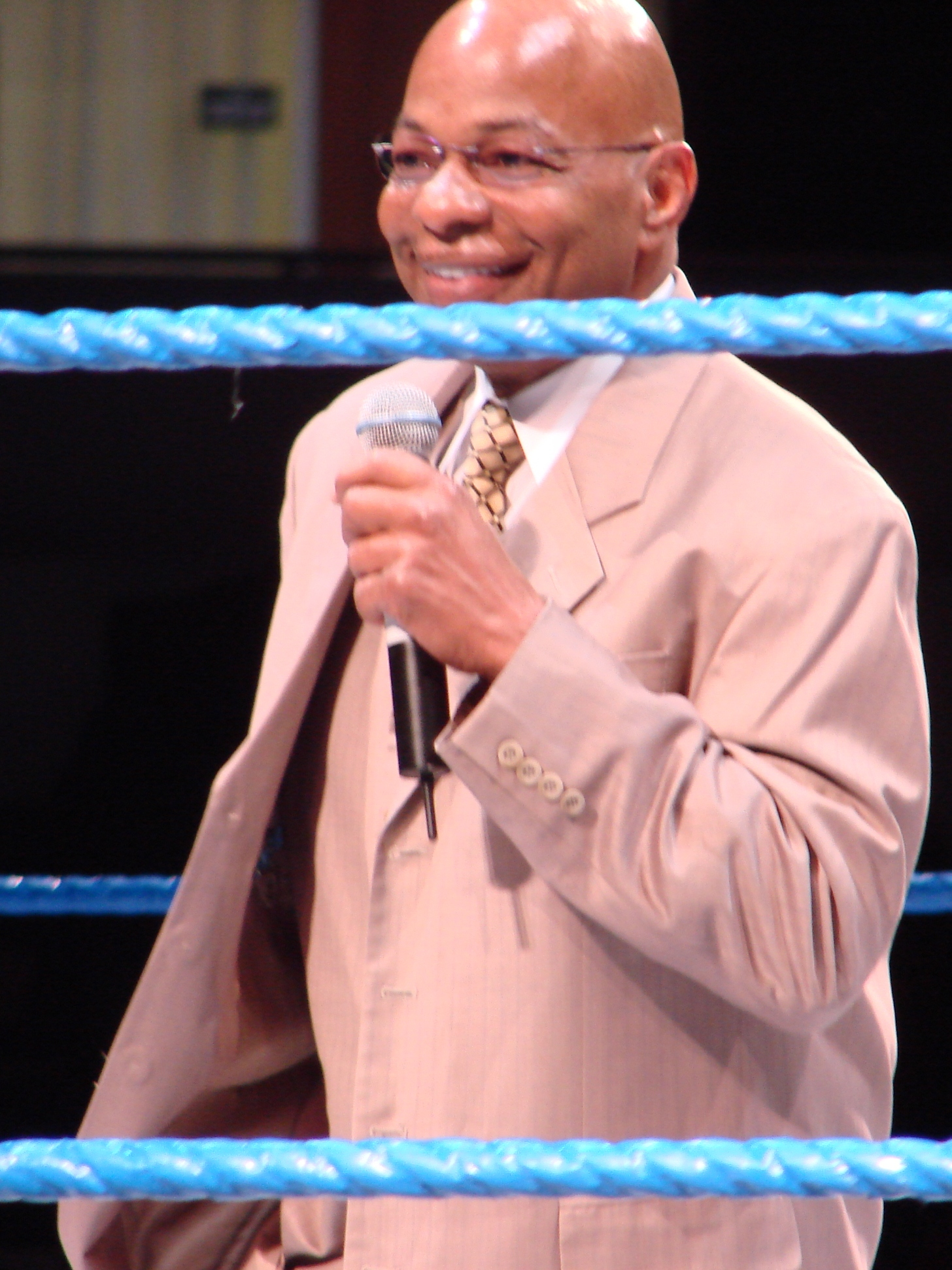
WWE Hall of Famer Theodore Long served as SmackDown General Manager twice, lasting a combined six years.

On June 6, then WWE Champion John Cena switched brands from SmackDown! to Raw as part of the month-long 2005 draft lottery. This effectively left SmackDown! without a world title. On the June 23 episode of SmackDown!, SmackDown! General Manager Theodore Long scheduled a six-man elimination match between Booker T, Chris Benoit, Christian (replacing Big Show, who was picked by Raw in the lottery), John "Bradshaw" Layfield, Muhammad Hassan and The Undertaker to crown the first SmackDown! Champion. On the June 30 episode of SmackDown!, JBL won the match, but Long appeared afterward and stated that even though he had won the match SmackDown! did not need a championship anymore, instead revealing that JBL was the number one contender for the World Heavyweight Championship, at which point Batista, then World Heavyweight Champion, entered the ring as SmackDown!'s final draft lottery pick.

At the SmackDown! taping on January 10, 2006, that aired January 13, Batista had to forfeit the World Heavyweight Championship because of a legitimate triceps injury suffered at the hands of Mark Henry the previous week. Long decreed a battle royal for the vacant title, which was won by Kurt Angle, who was on the Raw brand, but switched to the SmackDown! brand for the duration of his reign as champion. On the April 7 episode of SmackDown! (which was taped on April 4), Long revived the King of the Ring tournament after a four-year hiatus as a SmackDown! exclusive tournament. The tournament ended at Judgment Day with Booker T as the winner, defeating Bobby Lashley in the final.

On October 16, 2007, the SmackDown! and ECW brands began a talent exchange, allowing their respective talent to appear and compete on either brand, as ECW was broadcast live from the same arena where SmackDown! was taped.

During the 2008 WWE draft, WWE Champion Triple H was drafted to SmackDown, resulting in two world championships appearing on the brand – Edge was the World Heavyweight Champion at the time – and leaving Raw without a world title. However, Edge was attacked by Batista on the June 30 episode of Raw and immediately afterwards CM Punk cashed in his Money in the Bank contract to become World Heavyweight Champion, bringing the World Heavyweight Championship back to Raw for the first time since 2005. Also that year, for the first time in the brand's history a women's exclusive championship was introduced, the Divas Championship, a counterpart to the Women's Championship that had been the only active championship competed for by Divas, but which was exclusive to Raw, meaning that the Divas on SmackDown had no championship to compete for. Michelle McCool became the inaugural champion by defeating Natalya on July 20 at The Great American Bash.

On February 15, 2009, at No Way Out, Edge won the World Heavyweight Championship in Raw's Elimination Chamber match, thus making it a SmackDown exclusive title and giving SmackDown two top tier championships. As a result of the 2009 WWE draft in April, then WWE Champion Triple H was drafted to Raw while the World Heavyweight Championship also moved to the Raw brand after Edge lost the title to Cena at WrestleMania 25, once again leaving SmackDown without a world title. SmackDown regained the World Heavyweight Championship at Backlash when Edge invoked his WrestleMania rematch clause and defeated Cena in a Last Man Standing match to win the championship back. In addition, Raw and SmackDown exchanged both women-exclusive championships with Raw gaining the Divas Championship and SmackDown gaining the Women's Championship. This marked the first time in history that the Women's Championship had ever been exclusive to SmackDown. Raw and SmackDown also exchanged the United States Championship (which became exclusive to Raw) and the Intercontinental Championship (subsequently exclusive to SmackDown) for the first time since August 25, 2002.

On the August 29, 2011, episode of Raw, it was announced that performers from Raw and SmackDown were no longer exclusive to their respective brand. Subsequently, championships previously exclusive to one show or the other were available for wrestlers from any show to compete for—this would mark the end of the brand extension as all programming and live events featured the full WWE roster. In a 2013 interview with Advertising Age, Stephanie McMahon explained that WWE's decision to end the brand extension was due to wanting their content to flow across television and online platforms.

=== Second split (2016–present) ===
On May 25, 2016, it was revealed that the brand split would return in July. The 2016 WWE draft took place on the live premiere episode of SmackDown on July 19 to determine the rosters between both brands. On the July 11 episode of Raw, Vince McMahon named Shane McMahon the commissioner of SmackDown. Then next week on Raw, Daniel Bryan was revealed as the new SmackDown General Manager. Due to Raw being a three-hour show and SmackDown being a two-hour show, Raw received three picks each round and SmackDown received two. WWE Champion Dean Ambrose was SmackDown's first pick.

After the return of the brand split, most pay-per-views became exclusive to one brand, (with SmackDown producing Backlash (2016 and 2017), No Mercy (2016), TLC (2016), Elimination Chamber (2017), Money in the Bank (2017), Battleground (2017), Hell in a Cell (2017), Clash of Champions (2017) and Fastlane (2018)). From WrestleMania 34 onwards, all pay-per-views became dual-branded again.

On the November 7, 2017, episode of SmackDown, AJ Styles defeated Jinder Mahal for the WWE Championship. On April 10, 2018, SmackDown Commissioner Shane McMahon announced that Daniel Bryan was back as a full-time WWE Superstar for the roster after his in-ring return at WrestleMania 34, therefore "graciously accepted Daniel's resignation as SmackDown General Manager". McMahon then named Paige, who had retired from in-ring competition due to injury the night before on Raw, as the new SmackDown General Manager.

When SmackDown moved to FOX beginning with the October 4, 2019, episode, it eventually replaced Raw as the "A" Show. As a result, SmackDown became the home for the WWE's top stars such as Roman Reigns, Brock Lesnar, Drew McIntyre and the Usos. After Raw moved to Netflix in January 2025, SmackDown lost its status as the main "A" Show.

== Champions ==
Initially, the Undisputed WWE Championship and the original WWE Women's Championship were available to both brands. The other championships were exclusive to the brand the champion was a part of. When the brand extension began, SmackDown became the exclusive home for the World Tag Team Championship and the original Cruiserweight Championship.

In September 2002, the Undisputed Championship became the WWE Championship again and was moved to SmackDown, prompting Raw General Manager Eric Bischoff to create the World Heavyweight Championship for Raw. SmackDown created the WWE Tag Team Championship and they revived the United States Championship. Over the course of the first brand extension, these championships switched between brands, usually due to the result of the annual draft. However, the Cruiserweight title was the only championship to never switch brands, staying on SmackDown from 2002 until the championship's retirement on September 28, 2007.

In October 2007, SmackDown and ECW began a talent exchange agreement, which meant that SmackDown talent could appear on ECW and vice versa. This allowed the United States Championship and WWE Tag Team Championship to be shared between the two brands. In July 2008, the Divas Championship was created for SmackDown, allowing the SmackDown Divas to compete for a title.

With the brand extension ending in 2011, all Raw and SmackDown titles were merged. After five years, a new brand extension was introduced on July 19, 2016. SmackDown drafted the WWE Champion and the Intercontinental Champion. As SmackDown was lacking a tag team championship and a women's championship, Shane McMahon and Daniel Bryan introduced the SmackDown Tag Team Championship and SmackDown Women's Championship. In the 2017 Superstar Shake-Up, the Intercontinental Championship was moved to Raw and in exchange, the United States Championship moved back to SmackDown. The following year during the 2018 Superstar Shake-Up, the United States Championship was moved to Raw, but returned to SmackDown the next night. At Crown Jewel on October 31, 2019, SmackDown wrestler "The Fiend" Bray Wyatt won the Universal Championship, thus bringing the title to SmackDown. On the next night's episode of SmackDown, WWE Champion Brock Lesnar quit SmackDown and went to Raw, taking the title with him.

=== Current championships ===
SmackDown
Championship	Current champion(s)	Reign	Date won	Days held	Location	Notes	Ref.
Undisputed WWE Championship	Sami Zayn	2	September 11, 2026	68	Mexico City, Mexico	Defeated CM Punk on SmackDown.	
WWE Women's Championship	Tiffany Stratton	2	November 7, 2026	11	Riyadh, Saudi Arabia	Defeated Chelsea Green at Crown Jewel; this was Stratton's Money In The Bank cash-in match.	
WWE Men's United States Championship	Trick Williams	2	September 6, 2026	73	Atlanta, Georgia, United States	Defeated Baron Corbin at Sunday Night's Main Event.	
WWE Women's United States Championship	Jacy Jayne	1	August 14, 2026	96	Boston, Massachusetts, United States	Defeated Tiffany Stratton on SmackDown.	
WWE Men's Tag Team Championship	The MFTs (Tama Tonga & Talla Tonga)	1 (3, 1)	August 14, 2026	96	Boston, Massachusetts, United States	Defeated previous champions Damian Priest & R-Truth and The War Raiders (Erik & Ivar) in a triple threat tag team match on SmackDown.	
WWE Women's Tag Team Championship	Michin and B-Fab	1	October 23, 2026	26	Ontario, California, United States	Defeated Alexa Bliss and Tatum Paxley on SmackDown.	

The WWE Women's Tag Team Championship is defended across Raw, SmackDown, and NXT.

=== Previous active championships ===
Championship	Time on brand
World Tag Team Championship (WWE)	October 20, 2002 – April 5, 2009
WWE Intercontinental Championship	April 16, 2019 – April 28, 2023
Women's World Championship (WWE)	August 23 2016 – May 1, 2023

==== Previous defunct championships ====
Championship	Time on brand
WWE Universal Championship	October 31, 2019 — April 7, 2024
WWE Divas Championship	June 6, 2008 – April 13, 2009
WWE Women's Championship (Original)	April 13, 2009 – September 19, 2010
World Tag Team Championship (Original)	March 25, 2002 – July 29, 2002
WWE 24/7 Championship	May 20, 2019 – November 9, 2022 (Note: The championship was shared amongst all of WWE's brands, until it was retired on November 9, 2022.)

== Pay-per-view and WWE Network events ==
=== First brand split events ===
Date	Event	Venue	Location	Main event
October 26, 2002	Rebellion	Manchester Arena	Manchester, England	Brock Lesnar (c) and Paul Heyman vs. Edge in a Handicap match for the WWE Championship
July 27, 2003	Vengeance	Pepsi Center	Denver, Colorado	Brock Lesnar (c) vs. Big Show vs. Kurt Angle in a Triple Threat match for the WWE Championship
October 19, 2003	No Mercy	1st Mariner Arena	Baltimore, Maryland	Brock Lesnar (c) vs. The Undertaker in a Biker Chain match for the WWE Championship
February 15, 2004	No Way Out	Cow Palace	Daly City, California	Brock Lesnar (c) vs. Eddie Guerrero for the WWE Championship
May 16, 2004	Judgment Day	Staples Center	Los Angeles, California	Eddie Guerrero (c) vs. John "Bradshaw" Layfield for the WWE Championship
June 27, 2004	The Great American Bash	Norfolk Scope	Norfolk, Virginia	The Dudley Boyz (Bubba Ray Dudley and D-Von Dudley) vs. The Undertaker in a Concrete Crypt match
October 3, 2004	No Mercy	Continental Airlines Arena	East Rutherford, New Jersey	John "Bradshaw" Layfield (c) vs. The Undertaker in a Last Ride match for the WWE Championship
December 12, 2004	Armageddon	Gwinnett Arena	Duluth, Georgia	John "Bradshaw" Layfield (c) vs. Booker T vs. Eddie Guerrero vs. The Undertaker in a Fatal Four-Way match for the WWE Championship
February 20, 2005	No Way Out	Mellon Arena	Pittsburgh, Pennsylvania	John "Bradshaw" Layfield (c) vs. Big Show in a Barbed Wire Steel Cage match for the WWE Championship
May 22, 2005	Judgment Day	Target Center	Minneapolis, Minnesota	John Cena (c) vs. John "Bradshaw" Layfield in an "I Quit" match for the WWE Championship
July 24, 2005	The Great American Bash	HSBC Arena	Buffalo, New York	Batista (c) vs. John "Bradshaw" Layfield for the World Heavyweight Championship
October 9, 2005	No Mercy	Toyota Center	Houston, Texas	Batista (c) vs. Eddie Guerrero for the World Heavyweight Championship
December 18, 2005	Armageddon	Dunkin' Donuts Center	Providence, Rhode Island	Randy Orton vs. The Undertaker in a Hell in a Cell match
February 19, 2006	No Way Out	1st Mariner Arena	Baltimore, Maryland	Kurt Angle (c) vs. The Undertaker for the World Heavyweight Championship
May 21, 2006	Judgment Day	US Airways Center	Phoenix, Arizona	Rey Mysterio (c) vs. John "Bradshaw" Layfield for the World Heavyweight Championship
July 23, 2006	The Great American Bash	Conseco Fieldhouse	Indianapolis, Indiana	Rey Mysterio (c) vs. King Booker for the World Heavyweight Championship
October 8, 2006	No Mercy	RBC Center	Raleigh, North Carolina	King Booker (c) vs. Batista vs. Bobby Lashley vs. Finlay in a Fatal Four-Way match for the World Heavyweight Championship
December 17, 2006	Armageddon	Richmond Coliseum	Richmond, Virginia	Batista and John Cena vs. King Booker and Finlay
February 18, 2007	No Way Out	Staples Center	Los Angeles, California	Batista and The Undertaker vs. John Cena and Shawn Michaels

=== Second brand split events ===
Date	Event	Venue	Location	Main event
September 11, 2016	Backlash	Richmond Coliseum	Richmond, Virginia	Dean Ambrose (c) vs. AJ Styles for the WWE World Championship
October 9, 2016	No Mercy	Golden 1 Center	Sacramento, California	Bray Wyatt vs. Randy Orton
December 4, 2016	TLC: Tables, Ladders & Chairs	American Airlines Center	Dallas, Texas	AJ Styles (c) vs. Dean Ambrose in a Tables, Ladders, and Chairs match for the WWE Championship
February 12, 2017	Elimination Chamber	Talking Stick Resort Arena	Phoenix, Arizona	John Cena (c) vs. AJ Styles vs. Baron Corbin vs. Bray Wyatt vs. Dean Ambrose vs. The Miz in an Elimination Chamber match for the WWE Championship
May 21, 2017	Backlash	Allstate Arena	Rosemont, Illinois	Randy Orton (c) vs. Jinder Mahal for the WWE Championship
June 18, 2017	Money in the Bank	Scottrade Center	St. Louis, Missouri	AJ Styles vs. Baron Corbin vs. Dolph Ziggler vs. Kevin Owens vs. Sami Zayn vs. Shinsuke Nakamura in a Money in the Bank ladder match for a WWE Championship contract
July 23, 2017	Battleground	Wells Fargo Center	Philadelphia, Pennsylvania	Jinder Mahal (c) vs. Randy Orton in a Punjabi Prison match for the WWE Championship
October 8, 2017	Hell in a Cell	Little Caesars Arena	Detroit, Michigan	Kevin Owens vs. Shane McMahon in a Falls Count Anywhere Hell in a Cell match
December 17, 2017	Clash of Champions	TD Garden	Boston, Massachusetts	AJ Styles (c) vs. Jinder Mahal for the WWE Championship
March 11, 2018	Fastlane	Nationwide Arena	Columbus, Ohio	AJ Styles (c) vs. Baron Corbin vs. Dolph Ziggler vs. Kevin Owens vs. Sami Zayn vs. John Cena in a Six Pack Challenge for the WWE Championship
July 27, 2019	Smackville	Bridgestone Arena	Nashville, Tennessee	Kofi Kingston (c) vs. Dolph Ziggler vs. Samoa Joe in a Triple Threat match for the WWE Championship
