= Dan Spivey =

American professional wrestler (born 1952)

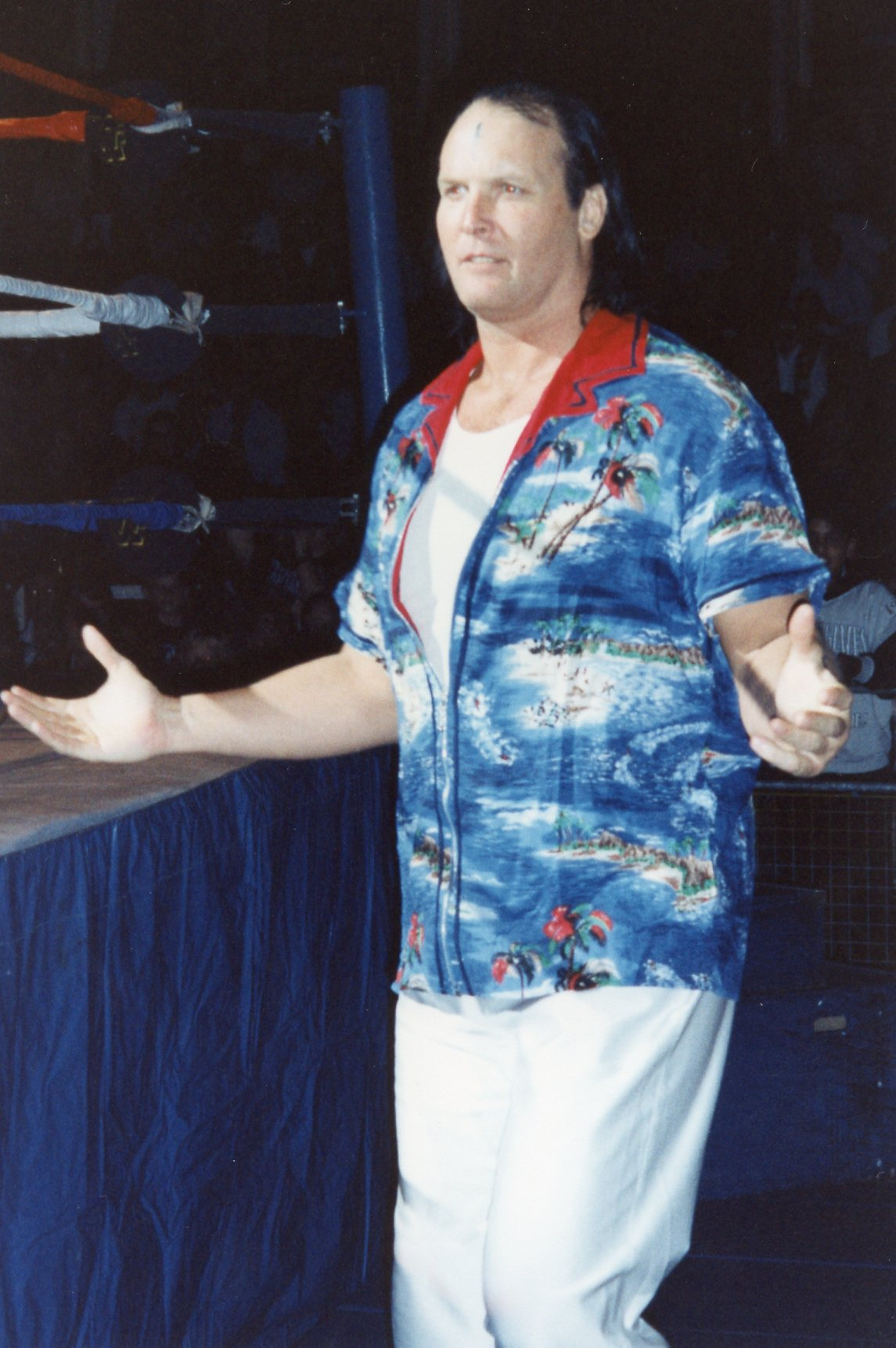
- Spivey as Waylon Mercy in 1995

Personal information
- Born: Daniel Eugene Spivey; October 14, 1952 (age 73) Tampa, Florida, U.S.
- Education: University of Georgia

Professional wrestling career
- Ring name(s): Dan Spivey; Starship Eagle; Waylon Mercy; Mr. America
- Billed height: 6 ft 7 in (201 cm)
- Billed weight: 290 lb (132 kg)
- Billed from: Griffin, Georgia; Tampa, Florida
- Trained by: Rick Martel; Dusty Rhodes; Barry Windham
- Debut: 1983
- Retired: October 1995

Daniel Eugene Spivey (born October 14, 1952) is an American retired professional wrestler best known under the ring names "Dangerous" Dan Spivey, Dangerous Dan, The Left Hand Man, Danny Spivey, Mr. America, and Waylon Mercy, initially working under the name Starship Eagle. Throughout his career, he has worked extensively for World Championship Wrestling, the World Wrestling Federation, and All Japan Pro Wrestling. He retired from wrestling in 1995 due to injuries and now works in alcoholism counseling in his native Florida.

Spivey spent a lot of his career as part of various tag teams and is especially known in the U.S. for teaming with Sid Vicious and then with "Mean" Mark Callous as "The Skyscrapers" in WCW and teaming with Mike Rotunda to form The U.S. Express in the WWF. He started his career teaming with Starship Coyote, collectively known as "American Starship". In Japan he teamed with various wrestlers over the years winning the World Tag Team Championship with Stan Hansen and teaming with Johnny Ace for long periods of time.

His last wrestling persona, Waylon Mercy, was inspired by Robert De Niro's portrayal of Max Cady in the 1991 remake of Cape Fear. While he only worked a few matches under that name, he later inspired the creation of the Bray Wyatt character as Spivey worked with Windham Rotunda to initially develop it.

== Early life ==
Spivey was born in Tampa, Florida. He attended the University of Georgia, where he played football for the Georgia Bulldogs for three seasons as a defensive end and was named an All-American football player in his sophomore year. Spivey aimed to play football professionally and was drafted by the New York Jets but did not sign with the Jets, instead deciding to sign with the Jacksonville Express of the World Football League in June 1975. He was released by the Express in late July 1975, before the start of the regular season. Spivey spent several years working in a number of jobs in Tampa before meeting professional wrestler Dusty Rhodes, who offered to train him to wrestle.

== Professional wrestling career ==
=== Championship Wrestling from Florida (1983–1984) ===
Spivey was trained as a wrestler by Dusty Rhodes, the then-booker for Championship Wrestling from Florida (CWF) and made his debut in 1983. Spivey and Scott Hall formed a tag team in CWF called "American Starship". Spivey adopted the ring name "Eagle" and Hall the ring name "Coyote". The men wore furry boots, bright masks and silver pants.

=== Jim Crockett Promotions / Central States Wrestling (1984–1985) ===
In 1984, Rhodes moved from Championship Wrestling from Florida to the Charlotte, North Carolina–based Jim Crockett Promotions, bringing Spivey and Hall with him. Initially, American Starship worked only sporadically. At first, they were booked so sparingly that the two were given a job for the Charlotte Orioles (which Jim Crockett owned at the time) as part of the ground crew. When the two men did get into the ring it was with little success. The highlight of their stay in Jim Crockett Promotions was being defeated by Arn Anderson and Ole Anderson when the rookies challenged for the NWA National Tag Team Championship.

In March 1985, American Starship joined Bob Geigel's Central States Wrestling promotion based in Kansas City, Missouri. The duo had a shot at the NWA Central States Tag Team Champions Marty Jannetty and "Bulldog" Bob Brown but did not manage to win the titles. Spivey's stay in the Central States territory was short-lived; according to Scott Hall, Spivey did not like Kansas City.

In June 1985, Spivey returned to Jim Crockett Promotions where he worked as "American Starship Eagle". He wrestled there until October 1985.

=== World Wrestling Federation (1985–1988) ===
In October 1985, Spivey signed with the World Wrestling Federation (WWF) and started wrestling without a mask and under his real name. Spivey was brought into team with Mike Rotunda as the American Express after Barry Windham left the federation. The team was sometimes referred to the U. S. Express II since the patriotic gimmick of the original U. S. Express was recycled, with Spivey taking Barry Windham's place.

The team had their first match together on November 1, 1985 less than a month after Spivey joined the WWF. The team continued the U.S. Express' feud with the Dream Team, but once they were proven unsuccessful, the two did not team from January to May as Rotunda briefly left the WWF. During this time Spivey took part in the WrestleMania 2 "wrestlers and football players" battle royal. Spivey was eliminated by The Iron Sheik without much fanfare. Once the American Express reunited, they feuded with The Moondogs, the Hart Foundation, and the Islanders, whom the team faced in their last match together on February 9, 1987.

Not long before Rotunda left the WWF, Spivey began to be billed as "Golden Boy" Danny Spivey which continued for his singles run after Rotunda left. His in-ring appearance at the time led to many fans labelling him a Hulk Hogan clone. As the "Golden Boy", Spivey wrestled in yellow trunks and boots, this colour choice combined with his height, build and blond hair saw him resemble the then WWF Champion. Spivey took part in the 1986 King of the Ring tournament, losing to Nikolai Volkoff in the first round. He also tried a new tag team partner. In March 1987 Spivey teamed with Tito Santana to unsuccessfully challenge the Hart Foundation for the WWF Tag Team Championship. Spivey was also part of the 1987 King of the Ring. This time he lost to Rick Martel in the first round. Spivey stayed with the WWF until the spring of 1988, becoming a heel and competing mainly against such low carders as Lanny Poffo and Outback Jack.

In 1991, Spivey testified that Dr George Zaharian had illegally supplied him with anabolic steroids in the late 1980s. Zaharian was ultimately found guilty.

=== All Japan Pro Wrestling (1988–1995) ===
After working exclusively in the United States since his debut, while making some appearances in Puerto Rico for the World Wrestling Council, Bruiser Brody talked to Spivey about going to Japan, Spivey started to tour with All Japan Pro Wrestling (AJPW) in the summer of 1988 and kept touring with the company every year until 1995, when he signed with the WWF. In his first tour, Spivey gained ring experience by competing with Japanese wrestling legend Genichiro Tenryu. Spivey also teamed with Johnny Ace, a man he would team with many times during his Japanese tours.

Spivey kept on touring with AJPW while working for the NWA, mainly teaming with Stan Hansen. Spivey and Hansen formed a very popular Gaijin team that almost won AJPW's "World's Strongest Tag Determination League" in 1990.

Spivey and Hansen won the All Japan Pro Wrestling World Tag-Team Championship from Terry Gordy and Steve Williams in Tokyo, Japan on April 18, 1991.

Spivey and Hansen would lose the tag-team titles back to Gordy and Williams. After the title loss, Spivey started to team with other wrestlers, mainly with Johnny Ace, but also linked up with Jim Brunzell, Kendall Windham and Jim Steele.

=== Jim Crockett Promotions / World Championship Wrestling (1989–1992) ===
==== The Varsity Club (1989) ====
In early 1989, Spivey returned to Jim Crockett Promotions. Spivey was made a member of The Varsity Club as a replacement for Rick Steiner, who left the group. Spivey's background as a football player at the University of Georgia was touched upon to lend credibility to his inclusion in the group. While in the Varsity Club, Spivey feuded with Rick Steiner and the Road Warriors, acting more as back-up while former tag team partner Mike Rotunda and "Dr. Death" Steve Williams were pushed as the stars of the group.

==== The Skyscrapers (1989–1990) ====
When the Varsity Club disbanded in June 1989, Spivey came under the management of ex-referee Teddy Long and started teaming with newcomer Sid Vicious under the name of The Skyscrapers. The Skyscrapers' (so named due to their height and leanness) first taste of success came at the Great American Bash pay-per-view, where they first co-won a Two-Ring King of the Hill Battle Royal with Sid being the survivor in one ring and Spivey surviving in the other. The rules called for the two to fight each other but manager Teddy Long convinced them to shake hands and share the prize money. Later in the night, the Skyscrapers defeated The Dynamic Dudes due to their overwhelming size and power.

The Skyscrapers quickly became involved in a feud with the Road Warriors, sparked by Teddy Long's actions while he was still a referee. The two teams were very evenly matched in power and intensity, creating a series of matches that did not favor one team over the other. Spivey and Vicious were disqualified against the Road Warriors at Halloween Havoc. Shortly after Halloween Havoc, the Skyscrapers faced the Steiner Brothers at Clash of the Champions IX in a hard hitting match. Sid Vicious suffered a punctured lung due to a broken rib. With Vicious out of action, Teddy Long brought in another tall newcomer in the same mold as Sid Vicious and Dan Spivey and dubbed him "Mean" Mark Callous. At the same time while working for the NWA as one of the Skyscrapers, Spivey also competed in his home state of Florida, winning the NWA Florida Heavyweight Championship in late 1989. However, this title win was not referred to on NWA Television. Spivey would go on to hold the title until July 1992, when he lost it to Lou Perez.

The New Skyscrapers immediately picked up the feud with the Road Warriors and kept on having inconclusive matches with them. At Clash of the Champions X the Skyscrapers finally got the better of the Road Warriors, not in the match, but afterwards when they beat the Road Warriors down. At this point in time, no one had ever been able to physically dominate the Road Warriors, something that pointed that big things had been planned for the Skyscrapers. However, in the days before the scheduled Chicago Street Fight at WrestleWar 1990, Dan Spivey suddenly left WCW, leaving the bookers to scramble for a replacement. Spivey stated in a shoot interview that he left the company over money issues, as well as his dislike of the Road Warriors themselves for taking what he perceived as liberties with his tag-team partner "Mean" Mark Callous.

On September 1, 1990, Spivey made his return to WCW when he substituted for former partner Sid Vicious against Lex Luger at a house show in Greensboro, North Carolina, losing via count-out. Spivey returned to television on the September 14 edition of the WCW Power Hours, where he discussed facing Brian Pillman. On the same show he would defeat Lou Perez. On the September 16 edition of WCW Main Event, Spivey prevented Pillman from running the Gauntlet and won $5,000. Spivey's next appearance came at Halloween Havoc 1990, where he threw a cowbell to AJPW partner Stan Hansen to use in a match against United States Champion Lex Luger. Hansen used the weapon and ended Luger's record title reign; this would in turn lay the groundwork for an eventual feud between Luger and Spivey. But before this could take place it was announced that the original Skyscrapers would reunite at Starrcade '90: Collision Course. This took place, and he and Sid Vicious made short work of The Big Cat and The Motor City Madman.

==== Various storylines (1991) ====
With Sid Vicious being part of the Four Horsemen, the Skyscraper reunion was short-lived. Instead, Spivey started to focus on his singles career in WCW, challenging WCW United States Heavyweight Champion Lex Luger at the February 1991 pay-per-view WrestleWar '91. Spivey did not win the title, although he continued to receive opportunities during house shows in March 1991. However, he would not receive another high-profile title opportunity on television while with the company. In April, he found himself teaming with various combinations of the Four Horsemen and reunited with manager Teddy Long. In May he formed a short-lived tag-team with The Angel of Death, the duo making their debut on the June 6 edition of WCW Pro and defeating Larry Santo and Keith Hart. On May 19 at the SuperBrawl I pay-per-view, Spivey defeated Ricky Morton.

In May 1991, Spivey again began teaming with Stan Hansen in WCW. On June 22, 1991, Spivey and Hansen were booked to face Rick Steiner and Tom Zenk and Spivey was told to lose the match to Zenk. Spivey refused since the duo were the AJPW World Tag Team Champions. After further discussions, Dan Spivey once again left WCW. Stan Hansen would depart a day later after being booked to be a part of the "Desperados" angle that was airing on WCW programming.

==== Final appearances (1992) ====
Spivey managed to mend fences with WCW and was brought in by new WCW Executive Vice President Bill Watts at the start of the summer of 1992. He made his televised return on July 4 edition of WCW Pro, defeating Gary Jackson. Spivey was given a renewed push and was undefeated in the summer against lower-level opposition. He also found himself frequently teaming with fellow new signing, The Barbarian. On August 6, 1992, he beat Tom Zenk at a house show in Fayetteville, NC. He was originally booked to team with The Barbarian at the Clash of the Champions XX in a match against Barry Windham and Dustin Rhodes, but was replaced by the newly arrived Butch Reed.

Spivey returned in December and suffered his first singles loss of his comeback on December 12, 1992, in Columbus, OH when he was defeated by WCW World Champion Ron Simmons. After another defeat to Simmons the following night, he teamed with Big Van Vader in a loss to Ron Simmons and WCW Television Champion Ricky Steamboat at a house show on December 13 in Greensboro, NC. On television, his biggest match during this time was his appearance at Starrcade where he teamed with Van Hammer to defeat Johnny B. Badd and Cactus Jack to advance in the "Lethal Lottery". Spivey was eliminated from the main event battle royal by eventual winner The Great Muta. His last televised match aired on the January 2, 1993 edition of WCW Worldwide where he lost to Dustin Rhodes. This match, having been previously taped on December 9, 1992, would be his last chronological match with the promotion.

=== Universal Wrestling Federation (1990, 1994) ===
In 1990, Spivey made regular American appearances for Herb Abrams' Universal Wrestling Federation (UWF). In 1994 he defeated Johnny Ace at UWF's Blackjack Brawl to become the only UWF Americas Champion.

=== Return to World Wrestling Federation (1995) ===
Spivey rejoined the WWF in June 1995, adopting the name "Waylon Mercy" in a character based on Robert De Niro's portrayal of Max Cady in the 1991 remake of Cape Fear. Like Cady, he had jet black hair, wore white attire with a Hawaiian shirt, and sported several strange tattoos, including one of a dagger on his forehead (Spivey's were temporary). The character was introduced through a series of vignettes that always had Spivey speaking in a calm yet sinister manner. In the final vignette before premiering the character in-ring, Spivey predicted that soon, "Lives are gonna be in Waylon Mercy's hands," a phrase that would later feature in his entrance music.

Spivey portrayed a heel despite his character acting as a peaceful southern gentleman outside the ring. Waylon would shake the hands of the fans and thank them for coming to see him wrestle, his opponent, and even the referee before his matches. However, once the bell rang, he became vicious, insincerely apologizing for actions such as kicking or choking a downed opponent. Mercy's finishing move saw him apply a sleeper hold as he revealed a wide-eyed, insane expression. Once the bell rang, he would return to his "peaceful southern gentleman" act.

Mercy was pushed upon his debut with victories over numerous enhancement talents (including a young Jeff Hardy), as well as established stars such as Bob Holly, The 1-2-3 Kid, and Doink The Clown. Soon after, he competed in matches with the top faces of the WWF at the time, such as Bret Hart, Razor Ramon, and WWF World Heavyweight Champion Diesel. Spivey's only pay-per-view appearance as Waylon Mercy came at In Your House 3, where he lost to Savio Vega. Spivey defeated Diesel by countout in his last televised match on September 26 (aired October 14). His last match was a win over Bob Holly in Cologne, Germany on October 10. He retired from the WWF in October 1995.

=== Retirement (1995–present) ===
Spivey retired in 1995 due to injuries. After retiring, he briefly attempted to forge a career as a fashion model. He went on to work for Spivey Underground Utility Construction Company, a construction company owned by his family. In 2014, Windham Rotunda revealed that his character of Bray Wyatt was given to him by Spivey who was attending the WWE Performance Center at the time and shares a number of similarities with the Waylon Mercy character.

On August 1, 2015, Spivey, at age 62, returned to the ring for Dory Funk Jr.'s !BANG! promotion. Spivey and Funk won a 10-man Japanese Banzai match.

Spivey also voiced Mercy the Buzzard in Bray Wyatt's Firefly Funhouse segments in 2019, as the puppet was based on Waylon Mercy.

On May 9, 2026, Spivey was shown and acknowledged in the crowd at Backlash.

== Personal life ==
Spivey was arrested on July 14, 2007, for driving under the influence in Odessa, Florida. He was released on $500 bond. He became sober in April 2009. He now owns his own company, Spivey's Sober Companions, in Odessa and Stamford, Connecticut. Spivey is also the Ambassador for the breakfast restaurant chain The Breakfast Station in Florida.

== Championships and accomplishments ==
- All Japan Pro Wrestling
  - World Tag Team Championship (1 time) – with Stan Hansen
  - World's Strongest Tag Determination League New Wave Award (1988) – with Johnny Ace
  - World's Strongest Tag Determination League Distinguished Award (1990, 1991) – with Stan Hansen
- Cauliflower Alley Club
  - International Award (2026)
- Championship Wrestling from Florida
  - FCW Heavyweight Championship (2 times)
- George Tragos/Lou Thesz Professional Wrestling Hall of Fame
  - Frank Gotch Award (2022)
- Pro Wrestling Illustrated
  - Ranked No. 43 of the top 500 singles wrestlers in the PWI 500 in 1992
- Universal Wrestling Federation
  - UWF Americas Championship (1 time)

== See also ==
- The Skyscrapers
- The U.S. Express
- The Varsity Club
