= King of the Ring (1987) =

Professional wrestling tournament by World Wrestling Federation

- Promotion: World Wrestling Federation
- Date: September 4, 1987
- City: Providence, Rhode Island
- Venue: Providence Civic Center
- Attendance: 12,000

King of the Ring tournament chronology
← Previous; 1986	Next → 1988

The 1987 King of the Ring was the third annual King of the Ring professional wrestling tournament produced by the World Wrestling Federation (WWF, now WWE). The tournament was held on September 4, 1987 at the Providence Civic Center in Providence, Rhode Island as a special non-televised house show. The 1987 tournament was won by Randy Savage. In addition to the tournament, there was one other match during the night. In this match, Jake Roberts defeated WWF Intercontinental Champion The Honky Tonk Man with Jimmy Hart via disqualification, after Hart accidentally hit Honky Tonk Man with the megaphone.

== Production ==
=== Background ===
The King of the Ring tournament was an annual single-elimination tournament that was established by the World Wrestling Federation (WWF, now WWE) in 1985 with the winner being crowned the "King of the Ring." The 1987 tournament was the third King of the Ring tournament. It was held on September 4, 1987 at the Providence Civic Center in Providence, Rhode Island and like the previous years, it was a special non-televised house show.

=== Storylines ===
The matches resulted from scripted storylines, where wrestlers portrayed heroes, villains, or less distinguishable characters in scripted events that built tension and culminated in a wrestling match or series of matches. Results were predetermined by World Wrestling Federation's writers.

== Event ==
There were a total of eight matches in the first round. Haku managed to pin Brutus Beefcake with a roll-up after Beefcake was momentarily distracted by Tama at the ringside. Rick Martel triumphed over Danny Spivey (who substituted for Koko B. Ware) with a small package. King Kong Bundy managed to defeat the One Man Gang via count-out. S. D. Jones (who substituted for B. Brian Blair) secured a victory over Sika with a small package. Danny Davis emerged victorious over Tito Santana via count-out after Santana got distracted and chased Jimmy Hart around the ring. Junkyard Dog successfully defeated Tama using a cradle. Jim Brunzell got Ron Bass pinned with a dropkick. Randy Savage pinned down Nikolai Volkoff with his finishing maneuver, the flying elbow smash.

In the quarterfinals, a total of four matches were played. Haku and Rick Martel battled to a 15-minute time-limit draw. King Kong Bundy elbow dropped S. D. Jones to secure the pin. Danny Davis won over the Junkyard Dog by way of count-out. Randy Savage successfully pinned down Jim Brunzell with his signature move, the flying elbow smash.

In the semifinals, only one match was played, as Bundy received a bye. Randy Savage beat Danny Davis with his signature maneuver, the flying elbow smash. For the only non-tournament match, Jake Roberts managed to defeat WWF Intercontinental Champion The Honky Tonk Man via disqualification after Honky Tonk Man used Hart's megaphone as a weapon.

For the finals, Randy Savage successfully pinned King Kong Bundy with his signature finishing move, the flying elbow smash, after Bundy missed an opportunity to splash Savage.

== Results ==
No.	Results	Stipulations
1	Haku defeated Brutus Beefcake	King of the Ring tournament first-round match
2	Rick Martel defeated Dan Spivey	King of the Ring tournament first-round match
3	King Kong Bundy defeated One Man Gang by count-out	King of the Ring tournament first-round match
4	Special Delivery Jones defeated Sika	King of the Ring tournament first-round match
5	Dangerous Danny Davis defeated Tito Santana by count-out	King of the Ring tournament first-round match
6	Junkyard Dog defeated Tama	King of the Ring tournament first-round match
7	Jim Brunzell defeated Ron Bass	King of the Ring tournament first-round match
8	Randy Savage (with Miss Elizabeth) defeated Nikolai Volkoff	King of the Ring tournament first-round match
9	Haku vs. Rick Martel ended in a draw	King of the Ring tournament quarter-final match
10	King Kong Bundy defeated Special Delivery Jones	King of the Ring tournament quarter-final match
11	Dangerous Danny Davis defeated the Junkyard Dog by count-out	King of the Ring tournament quarter-final match
12	Randy Savage (with Miss Elizabeth) defeated Jim Brunzell	King of the Ring tournament quarter-final match
13	Randy Savage (with Miss Elizabeth) defeated Dangerous Danny Davis	King of the Ring tournament semi-final match
14	Jake Roberts defeated The Honky Tonk Man (c) (with Jimmy Hart) by disqualification	Singles match for the WWF Intercontinental Championship
15	Randy Savage (with Miss Elizabeth) defeated King Kong Bundy	King of the Ring tournament final match
(c) / – the champion(s) heading into the match

=== Tournament bracket ===
First Round
Haku	pin
Brutus Beefcake	11:28
Rick Martel	pin
Dan Spivey	12:44
King Kong Bundy	CO
One Man Gang	3:06
Special Delivery Jones	pin
Sika	6:15
Tito Santana	8:02
Dangerous Danny Davis	CO
Junkyard Dog	pin
Tama	8:30
Jim Brunzell	pin
Ron Bass	6:30
Randy Savage	PIN
Nikolai Volkoff	10:38

Quarterfinals
Haku	15:00
Rick Martel	Draw
King Kong Bundy	PIN
Special Delivery Jones	7:30
Dangerous Danny Davis	CO
The Junkyard Dog	6:55
Jim Brunzell	12:30
Randy Savage	PIN

Semifinals
BYE
King Kong Bundy
Dangerous Danny Davis	9:02
Randy Savage	PIN

Final
King Kong Bundy	13:04
Randy Savage	PIN
