= King of the Ring tournament =

Recurring professional wrestling tournament by WWE

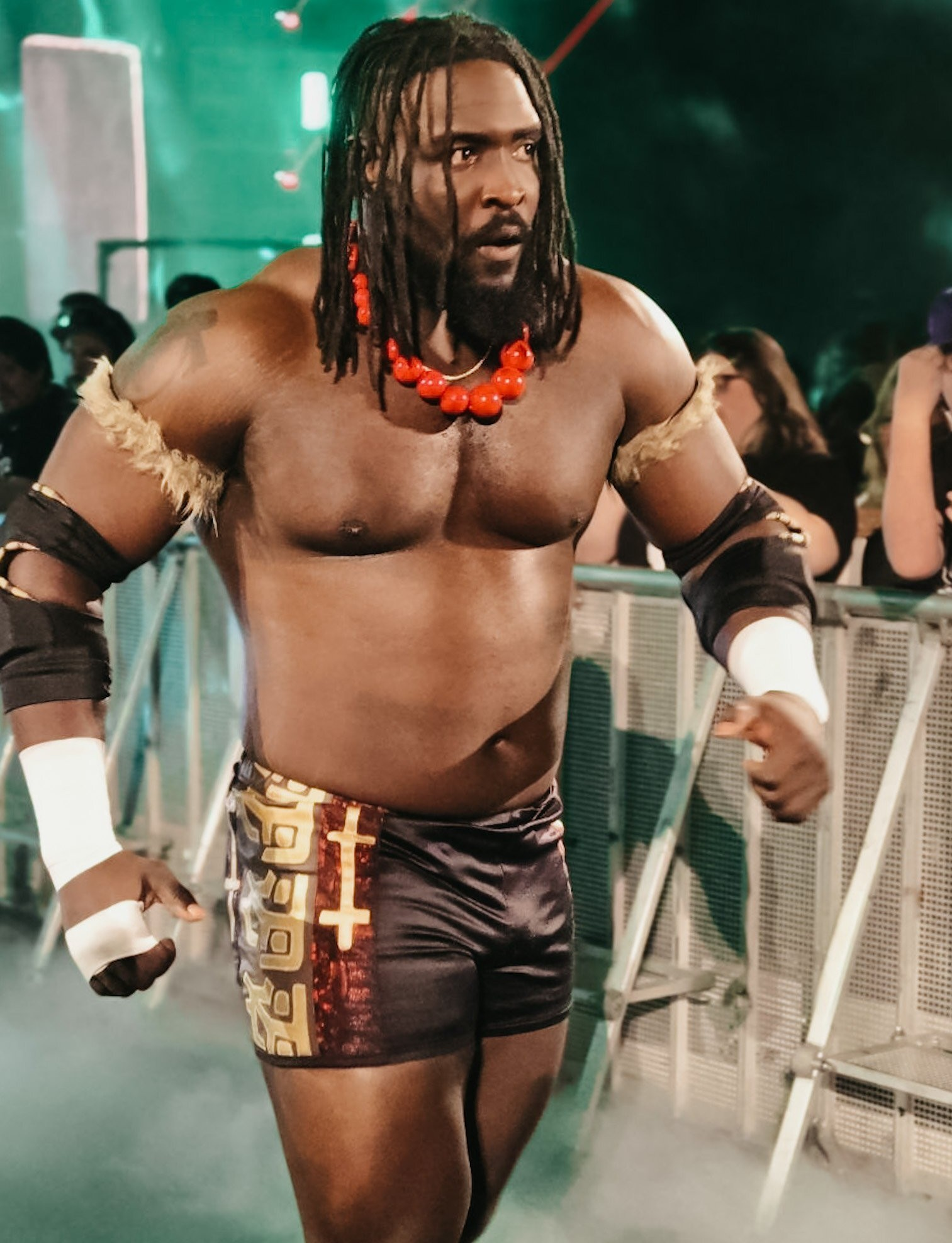
- 2026 King of the Ring Oba Femi
- Promotion: WWE

Tournament information
- Established: 1985; 41 years ago
- Current winner: Oba Femi
- Last completed: 2026
- Prize: World championship match at SummerSlam
- Editions: 25
- Format: Single-elimination tournament
- Participants: 16
Statistics
- First winner: Don Muraco
- Most wins: Bret Hart (2 wins)
- Oldest winner: Booker T (41 years, 81 days)
- Youngest winner: Mabel (24 years, 131 days)
- Heaviest winner: Mabel (487 lb (221 kg))
- Lightest winner: Xavier Woods (205 lb (93 kg))

The King of the Ring tournament is a men's professional wrestling single-elimination tournament held periodically by WWE, a Connecticut-based professional wrestling promotion. Established in 1985, the winner of the inaugural tournament was Don Muraco. Originally, the prize for winning the tournament was simply being crowned the "King of the Ring", but in 2002 and since 2024, the winner also receives a world championship match at SummerSlam. Some wrestlers have incorporated the "King of the Ring" title into their character, such as adopting king's attire and acting and speaking with a regal attitude. The tournament is also notable for beginning "Stone Cold" Steve Austin's rise to stardom after he won the 1996 tournament. The most recent 2026 tournament was won by Oba Femi.

The tournament was established when the wrestling promotion was still called the World Wrestling Federation (WWF, renamed to WWE in 2002). It was held annually from 1985 to 2002, with the exception of 1990 and 1992. The tournaments from 1985 to 1989 and in 1991 were held as special non-televised house shows. A pay-per-view (PPV) event titled King of the Ring then began airing as the annual June PPV from 1993 until the final PPV in 2002; these titular PPVs featured the final few matches of that year's tournament as well as other matches not part of the tournament. After a four-year hiatus, the tournament returned in 2006 and has since been held periodically. These tournaments' matches aired across episodes of Raw and SmackDown with the finals occurring at a different PPV, such as Judgment Day for 2006, or on an episode of Raw. The semifinals and final of the 2015 tournament aired exclusively as a WWE Network event. The PPV event returned in 2024, rebranded as King and Queen of the Ring, incorporating the Queen of the Ring tournament, a women's version that was established in 2021 and originally called Queen's Crown. The tournaments returned the following year with the finals annually held at Night of Champions.

WWE introduced the brand extension in early 2002 and the tournament that year was held for wrestlers from both the Raw and SmackDown brands. When the tournament returned in 2006, it was held exclusively for wrestlers from SmackDown. The tournaments in 2008 and 2010 were held as interbrand tournaments, with the one in 2008 also featuring wrestlers from Raw and ECW, while the one in 2010 just featured those from Raw and SmackDown after ECW was disbanded earlier that same year. The 2015 tournament occurred when the brand split was not in effect. The brand split was reinstated in 2016, and tournaments from then until 2024 since had featured two brackets, one each for Raw and SmackDown, with the bracket winners then facing each other in the tournament final. Since 2025, there have been two brackets, but mixed between the brands, which may result in the final being between two wrestlers from the same brand. (Note: In 2026, the finals for both the King and Queen of the Ring tournaments were entirely between wrestlers from Raw.)

== History ==
=== Early tournaments ===
The first King of the Ring tournament was held by the World Wrestling Federation (WWF) on July 8, 1985, at the Sullivan Stadium in Foxborough, Massachusetts. The inaugural tournament was won by Don Muraco, who defeated The Iron Sheik in the final. In addition to the tournament, there was only one other match during the night, in which Hulk Hogan defeated Nikolai Volkoff to retain the WWF World Heavyweight Championship. Further King of the Ring tournaments were held from 1986 to 1989 and in 1991. These early tournaments were held as special non-televised house shows in an effort to boost attendance at these events. The reward for winning the tournament was the title "King of the Ring", although 1986 winner Harley Race was the only one to carry this gimmick onto television during these early years of the tournament.

=== Pay-per-view and livestreaming (1993–2002, 2024) ===
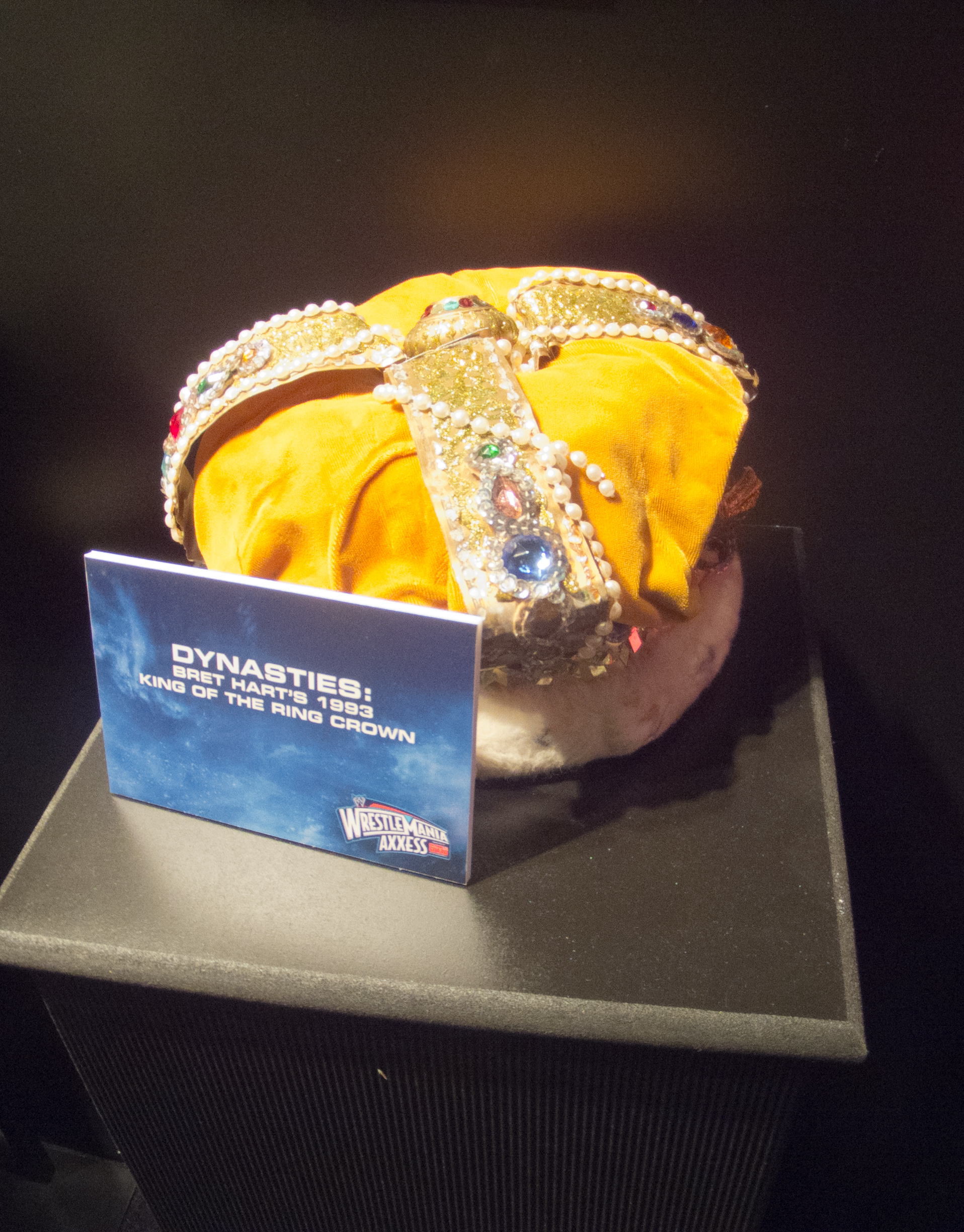
The crown won by Bret Hart at the 1993 event

In 1993, the WWF began to produce an annual June pay-per-view (PPV) titled King of the Ring. The inaugural King of the Ring PPV took place on June 13, 1993, at the Nutter Center in Dayton, Ohio. Unlike the previous non-televised events, the PPV did not feature all of the tournament's matches. Instead, several of the qualifying matches preceded the event with the final few matches then taking place at the pay-per-view. There were also other matches that took place at the event as it was a traditional three-hour pay-per-view. The King of the Ring pay-per-view was considered one of the promotion's "Big Five" PPVs of the year, along with the Royal Rumble, WrestleMania, SummerSlam, and Survivor Series, up until its disestablishment as a PPV event after the 2002 event—the 2002 tournament was the first tournament (and the only until 2024) to award the winner a reward other than the title of "King of the Ring"; winner Brock Lesnar received a match for the WWE Undisputed Championship at that year's SummerSlam. Also in early 2002, the WWF was renamed to World Wrestling Entertainment (WWE), and the promotion introduced the brand extension, in which the roster was divided between brands where wrestlers were exclusively assigned to perform. The 2002 tournament was in turn held for wrestlers from both brands.

In March 2023, it was announced that the tournament would return to having its own PPV and livestreaming event, but rebranded as "King and Queen of the Ring" to also incorporate the Queen's Crown tournament, and it would be held in Saudi Arabia as part of WWE's partnership with the country. On April 13, it was announced that these plans were scrapped, with WWE opting to instead hold Night of Champions. According to Mike Johnson of PWInsider, the decision to change the event to Night of Champions was a creative choice to revive and bring that event to an international market. Fightful later reported that WWE did not have plans to reschedule King and Queen of the Ring for later that year, but the event could possibly be used for a future Saudi show. In April 2024, WWE announced that they would hold the King and Queen of the Ring event in Saudi Arabia in May 2024, with the Queen's Crown renamed as Queen of the Ring. Tournament matches began on the May 6 episode of Raw, and were held across episodes of Raw, SmackDown, and at WWE Live events. On May 23, WWE Chief Content Officer Triple H awarded a world championship match of their respective brand to the winner of the 2024 King of the Ring tournament, marking only the second time that the King of the Ring winner would receive an award other than the title of "King of the Ring". The 2024 tournament was won by Raw's Gunther, who defeated SmackDown's Randy Orton with Gunther receiving a match for the World Heavyweight Championship.

=== Revivals ===
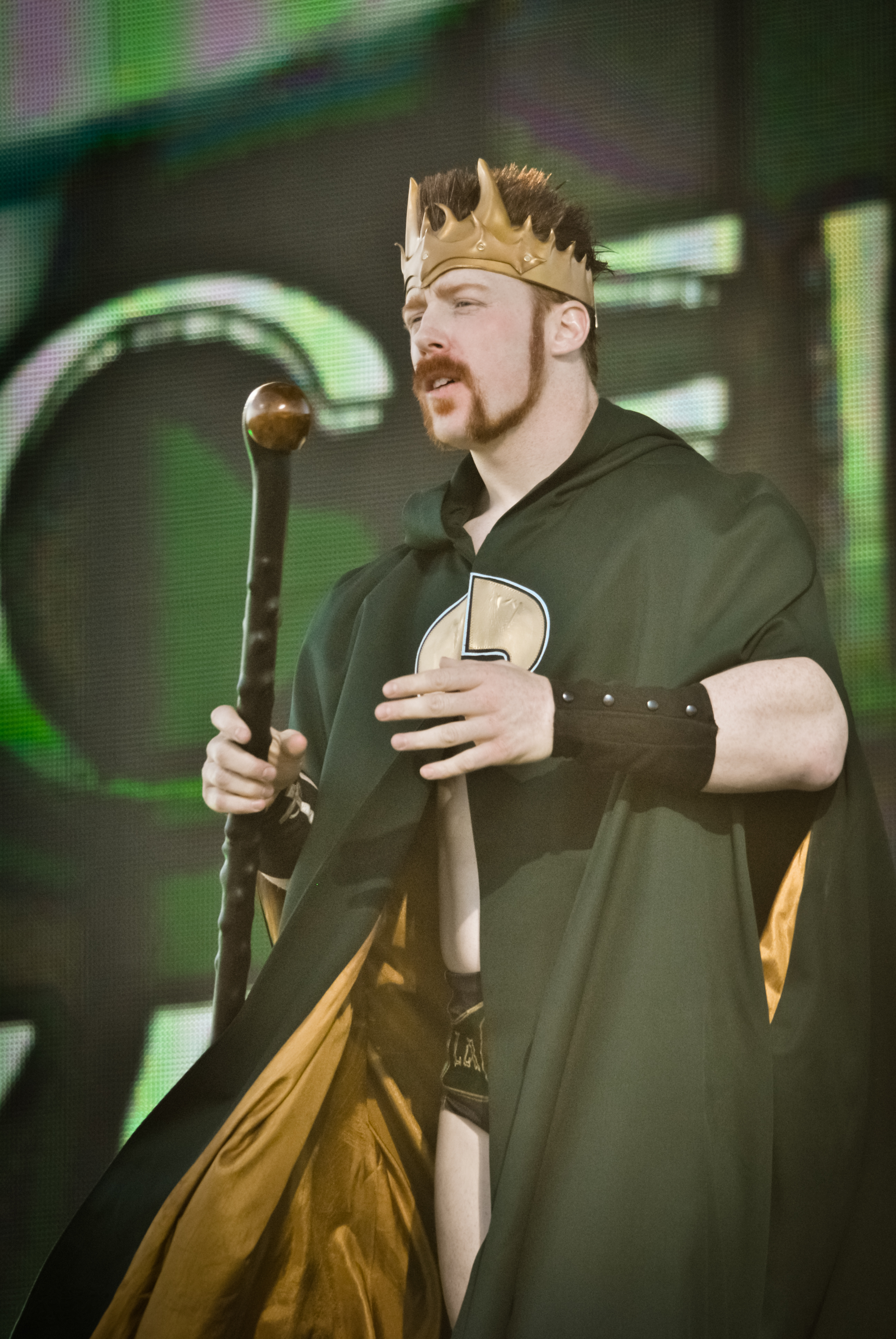
Sheamus, King of the ring 2010.

After a four-year hiatus, the tournament returned in 2006 and was held exclusively for wrestlers from the SmackDown! brand. Unlike the previous years, there was not an associated pay-per-view. Instead, tournament matches took place across episodes of SmackDown!. The final of the 2006 tournament did occur at a PPV, but it was at Judgment Day where Booker T defeated Bobby Lashley in the tournament final. The tournament then returned in 2008, and was held as a special episode of Raw on April 21. This tournament was held for wrestlers from all three of WWE's brands at the time—Raw, SmackDown, and ECW, the latter of which was established as a third brand in 2006. The 2008 tournament was won by Raw's William Regal, who defeated ECW's CM Punk in the final. The 2010 tournament was then held in November that year. Qualifying matches occurred on the November 22 episode of Raw with the tournament itself being held on the November 29 episode. The 2010 tournament only featured wrestlers from Raw and SmackDown, as ECW had been disbanded in February that year. It was won by Raw's Sheamus, who defeated John Morrison, also from Raw, in the final.

After a five-year hiatus, the tournament returned in 2015. Quarterfinal matches were held on the April 27 episode of Raw, with the semifinals and final airing the following night exclusively as an event on WWE's online streaming service, the WWE Network, which launched in February 2014. Bad News Barrett defeated Neville in the final. At this time, the brand split was not in effect as the brand extension had been dissolved in August 2011; also in April 2011, the promotion ceased using its full name with "WWE" becoming an orphaned initialism. After another four-year hiatus and after the brand extension had been reinstated in 2016, the tournament returned in 2019 and featured wrestlers from Raw and SmackDown. In this tournament, there was a Raw bracket and a SmackDown bracket and the winners of each faced off in the King of the Ring tournament final, becoming the standard for future tournaments. Tournament matches began on the August 19 episode of Raw and were held across episodes of Raw and SmackDown over the next month. The final was originally scheduled to occur at that year's Clash of Champions event, but was rescheduled to occur on the following night's episode of Raw on September 16. The tournament was won by Raw's Baron Corbin, who defeated SmackDown's Chad Gable in the final.

The tournament returned in 2021 and was again between wrestlers from Raw and SmackDown. It began on the October 8 episode of SmackDown and continued across episodes of Raw and SmackDown, with the final held at the Crown Jewel event on October 21, 2021. Additionally, a women's version of the tournament was introduced, called Queen's Crown, and was held simultaneously alongside the men's tournament. Raw's Xavier Woods defeated SmackDown's Finn Bálor to win the 2021 tournament. During the June 6, 2025, episode of SmackDown, the 24th King of the Ring tournament, along with the third Queen of the Ring tournament, was announced to be held that month, culminating at the Night of Champions PPV and livestreaming event on June 28. Like with the 2024 tournament, the winner received a match for the world championship of their respective brand at SummerSlam. The final was between two SmackDown wrestlers, where Cody Rhodes defeated Randy Orton to earn a match for the Undisputed WWE Championship.

The finals of the 2026 tournaments were again held at Night of Champions, but this time allowing the winners the choice of which world championship to challenge for at that year's SummerSlam. The King of the Ring final was between two Raw wrestlers, where Oba Femi defeated Jey Uso. Femi opened the following episode of Raw to celebrate his King of the Ring tournament win. He was interrupted by a returning Brock Lesnar, who he had been feuding with and who laid out Femi with an F-5. Afterwards, Femi decided to relinquish his SummerSlam world title match to instead face Lesnar at the event, who accepted on the condition that the match be made a Hell in a Cell match, which was made official.

== King gimmicks ==
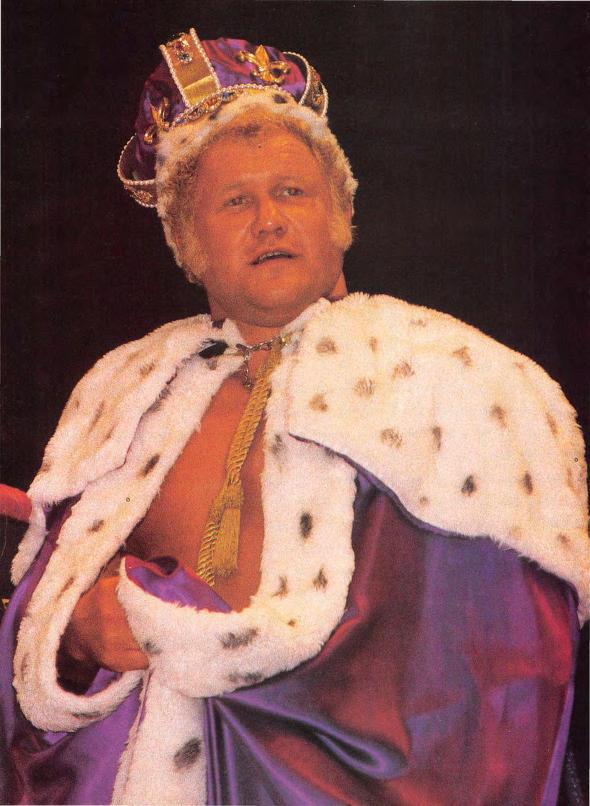
Harley Race, the second King of the Ring winner, was the first to incorporate the victory into his on-screen character

In 1986, the second King of the Ring winner, Harley Race, parlayed his victory into an arrogant King of Wrestling gimmick, featuring a regal cape and crown. This gimmick led to several notable feuds for Race with Junkyard Dog, Hulk Hogan, "Hacksaw" Jim Duggan, and others, even after new winners had been crowned in the annual tournament. In 1988, Race suffered an abdominal injury and during his absence, his manager Bobby "The Brain" Heenan awarded the crown to Haku in July, rechristening him King Haku, even though Randy Savage had won the tournament by that point and Ted DiBiase would also win the tournament during this storyline. Race eventually returned from his injury and briefly feuded with King Haku, but was unable to regain the crown at the 1989 Royal Rumble. King Haku then lost the crown to "Hacksaw" Jim Duggan in May 1989. "King Hacksaw" then lost it on August 30, 1989, to "Macho Man" Randy Savage, who rebranded himself "Macho King".

Savage abandoned the "Macho King" gimmick upon his loss in a "Career ending match" to Ultimate Warrior at WrestleMania VII in 1991, declaring afterwards that "the Kingdom of the Madness has been cracked in half". Following this, only wrestlers who had won the most recent tournament, as well as Jerry Lawler (who had used a King of Wrestling image regionally in the Memphis area since the early 1970s), would use the gimmick. Owen Hart ("King of Harts"), Mabel ("King Mabel"), Kurt Angle ("King Kurt"), Edge ("King Edge the Awesome"), Booker T ("King Booker"), Sheamus ("King Sheamus"), Bad News Barrett ("King Barrett"), Baron Corbin ("King Corbin"), and Xavier Woods ("King Woods") are all wrestlers that also took on "King" nicknames after winning King of the Ring tournaments, with varying amounts of indulgence in their respective gimmick. William Regal won the tournament while serving as General Manager of Raw and began displaying King Lear signs of tyranny and delusion. Triple H alluded to his King of the Ring victory as part of his integrated gimmick starting in 2006 as the "King of Kings".

In addition to the King's crown, various female wrestlers were portrayed as Queen while they were aligned with Kings, including "Queen of the Ring" The Fabulous Moolah (aligned with King Harley Race at WrestleMania III), Sensational Queen Sherri (manager of "Macho King" Randy Savage), and Queen Sharmell (manager of King Booker). Mo, Mabel's tag team partner in Men on a Mission, was "knighted" as Sir Mo by his partner after the latter's 1995 victory. Finlay and Regal were "knighted" as Sir Finlay and Sir Regal when they were part of King Booker's Court. In December 2020, King Corbin started a faction with Steve Cutler and Wesley Blake, knighting them as the "Knights of the Lone Wolf" (with lone wolf a reference to his previous nickname), although this would be short-lived as Cutler was released by WWE in February 2021. Corbin's king gimmick ended in June 2021 after he lost his King of the Ring crown in a match to Shinsuke Nakamura, who then took on a king persona, being called King Nakamura. On October 8, 2021, just prior to the start of the 2021 tournament that night, Nakamura respectfully relinquished the crown. After Xavier Woods won the 2021 tournament and became King Woods, he knighted his New Day tag team partner Kofi Kingston as "Sir Kofi Kingston", and appointed him the Hand of the King. After Woods took time off due to injury, his king gimmick was dropped upon his return.

== List of winners ==
In 2002, in addition to being crowned "King of the Ring", the winner also earned a match for the WWE Undisputed Championship at SummerSlam. A world championship match at SummerSlam would become an additional permanent prize beginning in 2024, with the winners of the 2024 and 2025 tournaments specifically earning a match for the world championship of their respective brand at the event, while beginning in 2026, the winners have a choice of which world title to challenge for at SummerSlam.

†	Winner from Raw brand	‡	Winner from SmackDown brand

#	Year	Winner	Tournament final			Runner-up
#	Year	Winner	Event	Date	Location	Runner-up
1	1985	Don Muraco	House show	July 8, 1985	Foxborough, MA	The Iron Sheik
2	1986	Harley Race	House show	July 14, 1986	Foxborough, MA	Pedro Morales
3	1987	Randy Savage	House show	September 4, 1987	Providence, RI	King Kong Bundy
4	1988	Ted DiBiase	House show	October 16, 1988	Providence, RI	Randy Savage
5	1989	Tito Santana	House show	October 14, 1989	Providence, RI	Rick Martel
6	1991	Bret Hart	House show	September 7, 1991	Providence, RI	Irwin R. Schyster
7	1993	Bret Hart	King of the Ring	June 13, 1993	Dayton, OH	Bam Bam Bigelow
8	1994	Owen Hart	King of the Ring	June 19, 1994	Baltimore, MD	Razor Ramon
9	1995	Mabel	King of the Ring	June 25, 1995	Philadelphia, PA	Savio Vega
10	1996	"Stone Cold" Steve Austin	King of the Ring	June 23, 1996	Milwaukee, WI	Jake Roberts
11	1997	Hunter Hearst Helmsley	King of the Ring	June 8, 1997	Providence, RI	Mankind
12	1998	Ken Shamrock	King of the Ring	June 28, 1998	Pittsburgh, PA	The Rock
13	1999	Billy Gunn	King of the Ring	June 27, 1999	Greensboro, NC	X-Pac
14	2000	Kurt Angle	King of the Ring	June 25, 2000	Boston, MA	Rikishi
15	2001	Edge	King of the Ring	June 24, 2001	East Rutherford, NJ	Kurt Angle
16	2002	Brock Lesnar	King of the Ring	June 23, 2002	Columbus, OH	Rob Van Dam
17	2006 (Note: The King of the Ring Tournament in 2006 was exclusive to the SmackDown brand.)	Booker T	Judgment Day	May 21, 2006	Phoenix, AZ	Bobby Lashley
18	2008	William Regal	Raw	April 21, 2008	Greenville, SC	CM Punk
19	2010	Sheamus	Raw	November 29, 2010	Philadelphia, PA	John Morrison
20	2015	Bad News Barrett	King of the Ring	April 28, 2015	Moline, IL	Neville
21	2019	Baron Corbin	Raw	September 16, 2019	Knoxville, TN	Chad Gable
22	2021	Xavier Woods	Crown Jewel	October 21, 2021	Riyadh, Saudi Arabia	Finn Bálor
23	2024	Gunther	King and Queen of the Ring	May 25, 2024	Jeddah, Saudi Arabia	Randy Orton
24	2025	Cody Rhodes	Night of Champions	June 28, 2025	Riyadh, Saudi Arabia	Randy Orton
25	2026	Oba Femi	Night of Champions	June 27, 2026	Riyadh, Saudi Arabia	Jey Uso

=== Winner's championship opportunity ===
Victory
Loss
Did not receive title match

#	Winner	Brand	Event	Date	Championship	Result
1	Brock Lesnar	Raw	SummerSlam	August 25, 2002	WWE Undisputed Championship	Defeated The Rock.
2	Gunther	Raw	SummerSlam	August 3, 2024	World Heavyweight Championship	Defeated Damian Priest.
3	Cody Rhodes	SmackDown	SummerSlam; Night 2	August 3, 2025	Undisputed WWE Championship	Defeated John Cena in a Street Fight.
4	Oba Femi	Raw	SummerSlam; Night 1	August 1, 2026	N/A	Femi relinquished his title opportunity to instead face Brock Lesnar in a Hell in a Cell match at SummerSlam.
