= King of the Ring (1989) =

Professional wrestling tournament by World Wrestling Federation

- Promotion: World Wrestling Federation
- Date: October 14, 1989
- City: Providence, Rhode Island
- Venue: Providence Civic Center
- Attendance: 4,500

King of the Ring tournament chronology
← Previous; 1988	Next → 1991

The 1989 King of the Ring was the fifth annual King of the Ring professional wrestling tournament produced by the World Wrestling Federation (WWF, now WWE). The tournament was held on October 14, 1989 at the Providence Civic Center in Providence, Rhode Island as a special non-televised house show. The 1989 tournament was won by Tito Santana. A tournament was not held in 1990 but returned in 1991.

== Production ==
=== Background ===
The King of the Ring tournament was an annual single-elimination tournament that was established by the World Wrestling Federation (WWF, now WWE) in 1985 with the winner being crowned the "King of the Ring." The 1989 tournament was the fifth King of the Ring tournament. It was held on October 14, 1989 at the Providence Civic Center in Providence, Rhode Island and like the previous years, it was a special non-televised house show.

=== Storylines ===
The matches resulted from scripted storylines, where wrestlers portrayed heroes, villains, or less distinguishable characters in scripted events that built tension and culminated in a wrestling match or series of matches. Results were predetermined by World Wrestling Federation's writers.

== Aftermath ==
Although the King of the Ring tournament had been held annually since 1985, a tournament did not occur in 1990. However, the tournament returned in 1991.

== Results ==
No.	Results	Stipulations
1	Akeem defeated Brutus Beefcake	King of the Ring tournament first round match
2	Hercules and Jim Neidhart ended in a double disqualification	King of the Ring tournament first round match
3	The Warlord defeated Bushwhacker Butch	King of the Ring tournament first round match
4	Tito Santana defeated Bad News Brown	King of the Ring tournament first round match
5	Rick Martel defeated Bill Woods	King of the Ring tournament first round match
6	Bushwhacker Luke defeated Nikolai Volkoff	King of the Ring tournament first round match
7	Jimmy Snuka defeated The Barbarian	King of the Ring tournament first round match
8	Haku defeated The Red Rooster	King of the Ring tournament first round match
9	Tito Santana defeated The Warlord	King of the Ring tournament quarterfinal match
10	Rick Martel defeated Bushwhacker Luke	King of the Ring tournament quarterfinal match
11	Jimmy Snuka defeated Haku	King of the Ring tournament quarterfinal match
12	Tito Santana defeated Akeem	King of the Ring tournament semifinal match
13	Rick Martel defeated Jimmy Snuka	King of the Ring tournament semifinal match
14	Tito Santana defeated Rick Martel	King of the Ring tournament final match
15	Dusty Rhodes defeated Big Boss Man (with Slick)	Singles match

=== Tournament bracket ===
First Round
Brutus Beefcake	12:56
Akeem	pin
Hercules	DDQ
Jim Neidhart	6:33
Bushwhacker Butch	5:10
The Warlord	pin
Tito Santana	pin
Bad News Brown	7:32
Rick Martel	sub
Bill Woods^{1}	00:55
Bushwhacker Luke	pin
Nikolai Volkoff^{2}	3:06
Jimmy Snuka	DQ
The Barbarian	9:48
Haku	pin
The Red Rooster	8:52

Quarterfinals
Akeem
BYE
The Warlord	10:08
Tito Santana	pin
Rick Martel	sub
Bushwhacker Luke	4:12
Jimmy Snuka	pin
Haku	7:28

Semifinals
Akeem	10:30
Tito Santana	pin
Rick Martel	pin
Jimmy Snuka	6:54

Final
Rick Martel	12:58
Tito Santana	PIN

1. Bill Woods substituted for Hillbilly Jim
2. Nikolai Volkoff substituted for Barry Windham
