= Gary Jackson (wrestler) =

American professional wrestler (born 1960)

Personal information
- Born: Gary Jackson; August 27, 1960 (age 66) New Orleans, Louisiana, U.S.

Professional wrestling career
- Ring name(s): Gary Jackson; Night Train Jackson; Jo Jo Jackson
- Billed height: 5 ft 10 in (1.78 m)
- Billed weight: 224 lb (102 kg)
- Debut: August 12, 1984

Gary Jackson (born August 27, 1960) is an American professional wrestler and sheriff best known for working in the World Championship Wrestling, World Wrestling Federation during the late 1980s and early 1990s and various Missouri promotions.

== Professional wrestling career ==
Jackson began his career in 1984 in Kansas City for Central States Wrestling. On November 5, 1986, he made his debut in the World Wrestling Federation (WWF) losing to Kamala at a house show in St. Louis, Missouri. He continued working for the WWF until 1991 when he went to USWA in Memphis. During that time he battled the likes of Dino Bravo, Sgt. Slaughter, The Warlord, and The Orient Express.

In 1991, Jackson went to the USWA (United States Wrestling Association) in Memphis, Tennessee where he was known as Night Train Jackson.

In 1992, he made his debut for World Championship Wrestling (WCW) where he fought against Rick Rude, Brian Pillman, Terry Gordy, Steve Williams, and Dan Spivey.

Later in 1992, Jackson made his return to the WWF losing to Razor Ramon, Irwin R. Schyster, Shawn Michaels, Bam Bam Bigelow, and Tatanka until leaving the company in 1994.

In 1994, Jackson returned to WCW where he lost to Jean Paul Levesque, Booker T, Meng, and competed in tag team matches until 1995.

Since leaving WCW in 1995, Jackson has worked in the independent circuit in Missouri. Most notably, the Mid-Missouri Wrestling Alliance from 1999 to 2021 and the Southern Illinois Championship Wrestling since 1999.

He won the MMWA Heavyweight Championship six times from 2005 to 2016.

In August 2024, Jackson was honored with the 2024 Independent Wrestler Award in Las Vegas at the Cauliflower Alley Club.

As of September 2026, he still wrestles at 66.

== Personal life ==
Outside of wrestling, Jackson is a sheriff for the St.Louis Police Department.

== Championships and accomplishments ==
- Cauliflower Alley Club
  - Independent Wrestling Award (2024)
- Mid-Missouri Wrestling Alliance
  - MMWA Heavyweight Championship (6 times)
- NWA Midwest
  - NWA Missouri Heavyweight Championship (1 time)
- Southern Illinois Championship Wrestling
  - SICW Classic Championship (1 time)
  - SICW Central States Championship (1 time)
  - SICW Tag Team Championship (2 times) - with Gil Rogers (1) and The Big Texan (1)
