= King of the Ring (2021) =

Professional wrestling tournament by WWE

- Logo for the 2021 tournament
- Promotion: WWE
- Brand(s): Raw; SmackDown
- Date: October 8, 2021–October 21, 2021

King of the Ring tournament chronology
← Previous; 2019	Next → 2024

King of the Ring (2021)
Tournament information
- Sport: Professional wrestling
- Location: United States Saudi Arabia
- Dates: October 8, 2021–October 21, 2021
- Tournament format: Single elimination tournament
- Participants: 8

Final positions
- Champion: Xavier Woods
- Runner-up: Finn Bálor

Tournament statistics
- Matches played: 7

The 2021 King of the Ring was the 22nd edition of the King of the Ring tournament produced by WWE. It was held between wrestlers from the Raw and SmackDown brand divisions. Tournament matches began on the October 8, 2021 episode of SmackDown and continued to be held across episodes of Raw and SmackDown. The tournament concluded at the Crown Jewel pay-per-view and livestreaming event on October 21. It was the first King of the Ring tournament since 2019. WWE also introduced a female counterpart called the Queen's Crown tournament, which was held simultaneously with the 2021 King of the Ring tournament. Raw's Xavier Woods defeated SmackDown's Finn Bálor to win the 2021 tournament and subsequently became known as King Woods.

== Background ==
The King of the Ring tournament is a single-elimination tournament that was established by WWE in 1985 with the winner being crowned "King of the Ring." It was held annually until 1991, with the exception of 1990. These early tournaments were held as special non-televised house shows and were held when the promotion was still called the World Wrestling Federation (WWF, renamed to WWE in 2002). In 1993, the promotion began to produce the King of the Ring tournament as a self-titled pay-per-view (PPV). Unlike the previous non-televised events, the PPV did not feature all of the tournament's matches. Instead, several of the qualifying matches preceded the event with the final few match then taking place at the pay-per-view. There were also other matches that took place at the event as it was a traditional three-hour pay-per-view.

King of the Ring continued as the annual June PPV until the 2002 event, which was the final King of the Ring produced as a PPV. Following the conclusion of the PPV chronology, the tournament began to be held periodically every few years, first making its return in 2006, which was held exclusively for wrestlers from the SmackDown brand—the 2008 and 2010 tournaments also featured wrestlers from WWE's other brands. In August 2011, the brand extension ended with both the Raw and SmackDown television shows featuring the full main roster, but in mid-2016, the brand split was reinstated. The tournament's return for 2021 was confirmed on the October 1 episode of SmackDown during the first night of the 2021 WWE Draft. A women's version of the tournament called Queen's Crown was also announced and held simultaneously with the men's tournament.

The 2021 King of the Ring tournament was an eight-man tournament, and like the 2019 tournament, there were two brackets, one each for the Raw and SmackDown brands, and the winners of each bracket faced each other in the final. The tournament began on the October 8 episode of SmackDown and continued to be held across episodes of Raw and SmackDown. The final was held at the Crown Jewel PPV and livestreaming event on October 21, 2021.

== Bracket ==
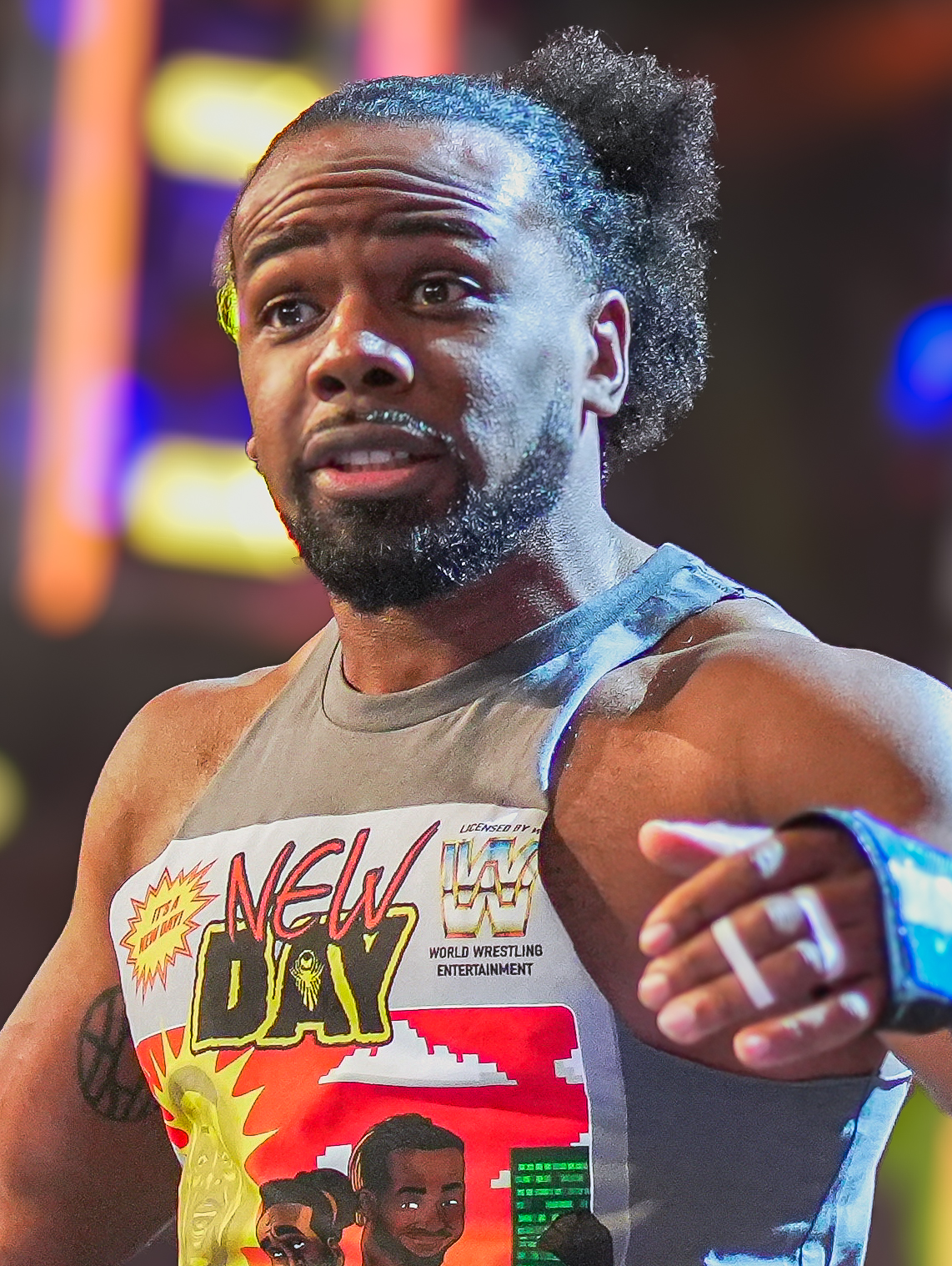
Xavier Woods, the winner of the 2021 King of the Ring tournament

Quarter-finals; SmackDown (October 8); Raw (October 11)
Rey Mysterio	8:00
Sami Zayn	Pin
SmackDown
Cesaro	11:25
Finn Bálor	Pin
Xavier Woods	Pin
Ricochet	10:55
Raw
Kofi Kingston	8:55
Jinder Mahal	Pin

Semi-finals; SmackDown (October 15); Raw (October 18)
Sami Zayn	11:25
Finn Bálor	Pin
Xavier Woods	Pin
Jinder Mahal	9:40

Final; Crown Jewel (October 21)
Finn Bálor	9:40
Xavier Woods	Pin

== Aftermath ==
On the October 22 episode of SmackDown, The New Day (Kofi Kingston and Xavier Woods) had a coronation to formally crown Woods for winning the 2021 King of the Ring tournament. Kingston introduced Woods, now adopting the name of King Woods, who was adorned with the crown, cape, and king's scepter. The following week, King Woods knighted Kingston as "Sir Kofi Kingston", the Hand of the King. After taking time off in January due to an injury, Woods returned in March and dropped the king gimmick.

== See also ==
- Queen's Crown (2021)
