= King of the Ring (1986) =

Professional wrestling tournament by World Wrestling Federation

- Promotion: World Wrestling Federation
- Date: July 14, 1986
- City: Foxborough, Massachusetts
- Venue: Sullivan Stadium
- Attendance: 12,000

King of the Ring tournament chronology
← Previous; 1985	Next → 1987

The 1986 King of the Ring was the second annual King of the Ring professional wrestling tournament produced by the World Wrestling Federation (WWF, now WWE). The tournament was held on July 14, 1986 at the Sullivan Stadium in Foxborough, Massachusetts as a special non-televised house show. The 1986 tournament was won by Harley Race.

In addition to the tournament, there were two other matches. Prior to the final match of the King of the Ring tournament, Bruno Sammartino defeated The Designated Hitman (a substitute for Eddie Andelman, a local TV/radio personality who refused to wrestle). Following the final match in the tournament, the British Bulldogs (Davey Boy Smith and The Dynamite Kid) defeated The Dream Team (Greg Valentine and Brutus Beefcake) (with Johnny V.) in a steel cage match to retain the WWF Tag Team Championship. Dynamite and Beefcake escaped from the cage first. Smith then escaped the cage to win the match after Valentine accidentally knocked him out through the door with a kick.

== Production ==
=== Background ===
In 1985, the World Wrestling Federation (WWF, now WWE) established the King of the Ring tournament, a single-elimination tournament in which the winner was crowned the "King of the Ring." The 1986 tournament established it as an annual event. It was held on July 14, 1986 at the Sullivan Stadium in Foxborough, Massachusetts and like the previous year, was a special non-televised house show.

=== Storylines ===
The matches resulted from scripted storylines, where wrestlers portrayed heroes, villains, or less distinguishable characters in scripted events that built tension and culminated in a wrestling match or series of matches. Results were predetermined by World Wrestling Federation's writers.

== Event ==
In the first round of the tournament, there was a total of six matches. Billy Jack Haynes pinned The Iron Sheik after a small package. Harley Race beat George Steele by disqualification after Steele rammed Race into one of the golf carts at ringside. Don Muraco and Roddy Piper wrestled to a twenty minute time limit draw, eliminating both men. Nikolai Volkoff pinned Dan Spivey. Junkyard Dog beat Paul Orndorff by disqualification after Orndorff attacked the Referee. Pedro Morales pinned Rudy Diamond who was substituting for Bob Orton.

There were three matches in the quarter-final round; Race received a bye due to the first round Muraco-Piper match ending in a time limit draw. Billy Jack Haynes beat Mr. X with a full nelson. Mr X was a substitute for Hercules Hernandez. Nikolai Volkoff beat Junkyard Dog after Dog submitted to a bearhug. In the final quarterfinal match, Morales pinned Mike Rotunda after Rotunda performed a back suplex from the top rope on Morales, but Rotunda's shoulders were on the mat.

In the first semi-final match, Race beat Haynes, when Haynes was counted out while applying the full nelson on Race while on the outside of the ring on the apron. The other match saw Morales defeat Volkoff, after Morales broke free and reversed a bearhug into a small package for the pin.

In the final, Race pinned Morales after he superplexed Morales back into the ring.

== Aftermath ==
Following the event, Race began referring to himself as "King" Harley Race, approaching the ring in a crown and cape, to the ceremonial accompaniment of the Tenth Movement (known as "The Great Gates of Kiev") of Pictures at an Exhibition by Modest Mussorgsky. After winning a match, Race would command his defeated opponent to bow and kneel before him; his manager, Bobby Heenan, would assist by grabbing the opponent's hair and forcing them to bow before Race.

== Results ==
No.	Results	Stipulations	Times
1	Don Muraco (with Mr. Fuji) vs. Roddy Piper ended in a time limit draw	King of the Ring tournament first round match	20:00
2	Harley Race defeated George Steele by disqualification	King of the Ring tournament first round match	7:42
3	Billy Jack Haynes defeated The Iron Sheik	King of the Ring tournament first round match	10:30
4	Nikolai Volkoff defeated Dan Spivey	King of the Ring tournament first round match	6:08
5	Junkyard Dog defeated Paul Orndorff by disqualification	King of the Ring tournament first round match	13:26
6	Pedro Morales defeated Rudy Diamond	King of the Ring tournament first round match	3:06
7	Billy Jack Haynes defeated Mr. X	King of the Ring tournament quarter-final match	00:59
8	Nikolai Volkoff defeated Junkyard Dog	King of the Ring tournament quarter-final match	11:16
9	Pedro Morales defeated Mike Rotunda	King of the Ring tournament quarter-final match	10:00
10	Harley Race defeated Billy Jack Haynes by count-out	King of the Ring tournament semi-final match	12:30
11	Pedro Morales defeated Nikolai Volkoff	King of the Ring tournament semi-final match	11:44
12	Bruno Sammartino defeated The Designated Hitman	Singles match	8:17
13	Harley Race defeated Pedro Morales	King of the Ring tournament final match	10:58
14	British Bulldogs (Davey Boy Smith and The Dynamite Kid) (c) defeated The Dream Team (Greg Valentine and Brutus Beefcake) (with Johnny V.) by escaping the cage	Steel cage match for the WWF World Tag Team Championship	16:56
(c) / – the champion(s) heading into the match

=== Tournament bracket ===
First Round
Billy Jack Haynes	pin
The Iron Sheik	10:30
Harley Race	DQ
George Steele	7:42
Don Muraco	draw
Roddy Piper	20:00
Nikolai Volkoff	pin
Dan Spivey	6:08
Junkyard Dog	DQ
Paul Orndorff	13:26
Pedro Morales	pin
Rudy Diamond^{1}	3:06

Quarterfinals
Mr. X^{2}	00:59
Billy Jack Haynes	Sub
Harley Race
BYE
Nikolai Volkoff	Sub
Junkyard Dog	11:16
Pedro Morales	pin
Mike Rotunda	10:00

Semifinals
Billy Jack Haynes	12:30
Harley Race	CO
Nikolai Volkoff	11:44
Pedro Morales	pin

Final
Harley Race	PIN
Pedro Morales	10:58

1. Rudy Diamond was a substitute for Bob Orton.
2. Mr. X was a substitute for Hercules Hernandez
