= Rudy Diamond =

American professional wrestler

Personal information
- Born: Rudolph Freed; May 9, 1959 Limon, Costa Rica
- Died: March 8, 2025 (aged 65) Milton, Massachusetts
- Cause of death: Cancer

Professional wrestling career
- Ring name: Rudy Diamond
- Billed weight: 251 lb (114 kg)
- Billed from: Boston, Massachusetts
- Debut: 1980s

Rudolph Freed (May 9, 1959 – March 8, 2025) was a Costa Rican-American professional wrestler best known by his ring name Rudy Diamond during his time in the World Wrestling Federation (WWF, now WWE) during the 1980s. He also wrestled for National Wrestling Alliance (NWA), Stampede Wrestling, and the independents.

== Professional wrestling career ==
Born in Costa Rica, but relocated to the United States in 1976, joining his mother and stepfather.

He would make his professional wrestling debut in Massachusetts. Known for wrestling barefoot, Diamond made his debut in the World Wrestling Federation in 1983. He would wrestle against Big John Studd, Don Muraco, The Iron Sheik, Greg Valentine, Paul Orndorff, and The Wild Samoans. In 1985, he worked in Maine for International Championship Wrestling.

In 1986, he returned to the WWF. Diamond participated in the King of the Ring (1986) when he lost to Pedro Morales in the first round. He was substituting for Bob Orton Jr..

Later in his career he wrestled for Stampede Wrestling in Calgary, World Class Championship Wrestling in Dallas and Florida. His last recorded match is believed to be in 1989.

== Personal life and death ==
After wrestling, Diamond worked in construction and started his construction company, Diamond Construction, where he hired his nephews and their friends.

In June 2022, Diamond was diagnosed with cancer. He died on March 8, 2025, at 65 from cancer.
