= King of the Ring (1988) =

Professional wrestling tournament by World Wrestling Federation

- Promotion: World Wrestling Federation
- Date: October 16, 1988
- City: Providence, Rhode Island
- Venue: Providence Civic Center
- Attendance: 6,700

King of the Ring tournament chronology
← Previous; 1987	Next → 1989

The 1988 King of the Ring was the fourth annual King of the Ring professional wrestling tournament produced by the World Wrestling Federation. The tournament was held on October 16, 1988 at the Providence Civic Center in Providence, Rhode Island as a special non-televised house show. The 1988 tournament was won by Ted DiBiase. when he defeated Randy Savage in the final In addition to the tournament, there was only one other match during the night. In this match Jim Duggan defeated Dino Bravo (with Frenchy Martin) in a flag match. Duggan pinned Bravo when Martin accidentally hit Bravo with the flag.

== Production ==
=== Background ===
The King of the Ring tournament was an annual single-elimination tournament that was established by the World Wrestling Federation in 1985 with the winner being crowned the "King of the Ring." The 1988 tournament was the fourth King of the Ring tournament. It was held on October 16, 1988 at the Providence Civic Center in Providence, Rhode Island and like the previous years, it was a special non-televised house show.

=== Storylines ===
The matches resulted from scripted storylines, where wrestlers portrayed heroes, villains, or less distinguishable characters in scripted events that built tension and culminated in a wrestling match or series of matches. Results were predetermined by World Wrestling Federation's writers.

== Results ==
No.	Results	Stipulations	Times
1	Ken Patera defeated Nikolai Volkoff	King of the Ring tournament first round match	10:20
2	Ted DiBiase defeated Brutus Beefcake	King of the Ring tournament first round match	7:32
3	Ron Bass defeated The Barbarian by disqualification	King of the Ring tournament first round match	7:02
4	Shawn Michaels defeated Dangerous Danny Davis	King of the Ring tournament first round match	3:37
5	Bad News Brown vs. Hercules ended in a double countout	King of the Ring tournament first round match	6:05
6	Randy Savage (with Miss Elizabeth) defeated Virgil	King of the Ring tournament first round match	5:43
7	The Red Rooster defeated Marty Jannetty	King of the Ring tournament first round match	11:00
8	Mike Sharpe defeated Boris Zhukov	King of the Ring tournament first round match	6:27
9	Jim Duggan defeated Dino Bravo (with Frenchy Martin)	Flag match	8:43
10	Ted DiBiase defeated Ken Patera	King of the Ring tournament quarter-final match	5:42
11	Ron Bass defeated Shawn Michaels	King of the Ring tournament quarter-final match	7:39
12	The Red Rooster defeated Mike Sharpe	King of the Ring tournament quarter-final match	3:27
13	Randy Savage (with Miss Elizabeth) defeated The Red Rooster	King of the Ring tournament semi-final match	7:21
14	Ted DiBiase defeated Randy Savage (with Miss Elizabeth) by count-out	King of the Ring tournament final match	6:11

=== Tournament bracket ===
First Round
Ken Patera	Pin
Nikolai Volkoff	10:20
Brutus Beefcake	Pin
Ted DiBiase	7:32
The Barbarian	DQ
Ron Bass	7:02
Dangerous Danny Davis	Pin
Shawn Michaels	3:37
Bad News Brown	DCO
Hercules	6:05
Randy Savage	Pin
Virgil	5:43
Marty Jannetty	Pin
The Red Rooster	11:00
Mike Sharpe^{1}	Pin
Boris Zhukov	6:27

Quarterfinals
Ken Patera	Pin
Ted DiBiase	5:42
Ron Bass	Pin
Shawn Michaels	7:39
BYE
Randy Savage
The Red Rooster	Sub
Iron Mike Sharpe	3:27

Semifinals
Ted DiBiase	Forfeit
Ron Bass	^{2}
Randy Savage	Pin
The Red Rooster	7:21

Final
Ted DiBiase	CO
Randy Savage	6:11

1. Mike Sharpe substituted for The Warlord.
2. DiBiase paid Bass off to fake an injury.
