= Rick Martel =

Canadian professional wrestler (born 1956)

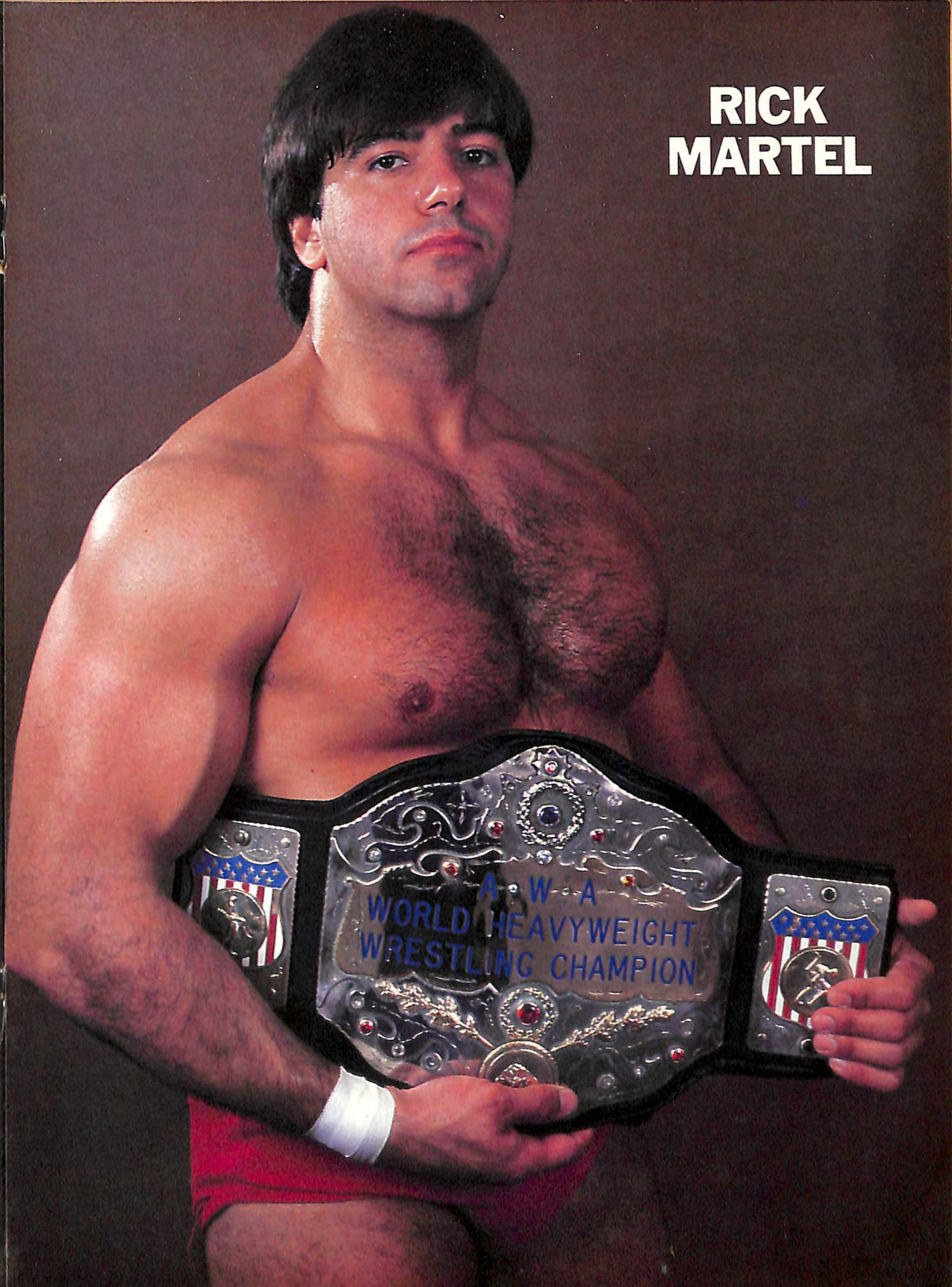
- Martel, c. 1985 as AWA World Heavyweight Champion

Personal information
- Born: Richard Vigneault; March 18, 1956 (age 70) Quebec City, Quebec, Canada
- Spouse: Johanne Vigneault (m. 1983)
- Children: 1

Professional wrestling career
- Ring name(s): Gus Griffin; Pat Kelly; Rick Martel; The Model
- Billed height: 6 ft 0 in (183 cm)
- Billed weight: 230 lb (104 kg)
- Billed from: Montreal, Quebec, Canada; Cocoa Beach, Florida (as The Model); Quebec City, Quebec, Canada (WCW)
- Trained by: Pierre Martel
- Debut: June 7, 1973
- Retired: March 23, 1999

Richard Vigneault (born March 18, 1956) is a Canadian retired professional wrestler, trainer, and television presenter, better known by his ring name, "The Model" Rick Martel. He is best known for his appearances with the American Wrestling Association, the World Wrestling Federation and World Championship Wrestling. Championships held by Martel over the course of his career include the AWA World Heavyweight Championship, WCW World Television Championship, and WWF World Tag Team Championship.

== Professional wrestling career ==
=== Early career (1973–1980) ===
Martel is from a family of wrestlers, and made his professional debut at age seventeen when his brother Michel, a wrestler, asked him to replace an injured wrestler. Martel already was a skilled amateur wrestler, and quickly adapted to professional wrestling.

Martel wrestled throughout the world, winning titles in Canada (in Stu Hart's Stampede Wrestling and Vancouver-based NWA All Star Wrestling), New Zealand, Japan, Hawaii, and Puerto Rico–based World Wrestling Council (WWC). His first real success in the United States came in the National Wrestling Alliance (NWA)'s Portland affiliate, Pacific Northwest Wrestling in 1979, where he became a top talent, holding the Canadian and PNW tag team titles simultaneously. He left PNW on August 16, 1980, when he lost a "loser leaves town" match to Buddy Rose. Martel also served a stint as a booker for a wrestling territory in Hawaii, where he would help the promotion set up matches and construct the storylines that would play out inside and outside of the ring.

=== World Wrestling Federation (1980–1982) ===
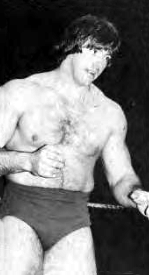
Martel in 1981

Martel debuted in the World Wrestling Federation (WWF) in July 1980. That fall, he formed a tag team with Tony Garea. On November 8, they defeated The Wild Samoans to capture the WWF Tag Team Championship. They successfully defended the title until dropping the belts to The Moondogs on March 17, 1981. They regained the title from The Moondogs on July 21. Their second reign came to an end on October 13, when they lost to Mr. Fuji and Mr. Saito. Though they would challenge the champions numerous times, Martel and Garea were unable to recapture the belts, and Martel left the WWF in April 1982.

=== American Wrestling Association (1982–1986) ===
Martel signed with the AWA in 1982 and quickly ascended through the ranks, defeating Jumbo Tsuruta to win the AWA World Heavyweight Championship on May 13, 1984. His reign as champion lasted nearly nineteen months (the third-longest title reign and the longest title reign of the 1980s), during which time he wrestled several matches with NWA World Champion Ric Flair, as well as with Jimmy Garvin, Nick Bockwinkel and King Tonga. His finishing move alternated between the slingshot splash and the combination atomic drop/back suplex. On December 29, 1985, Martel lost the title to Stan Hansen, who forced him to submit to the "Brazos Valley Backbreaker" (Hansen's version of the Boston crab).

=== World Wrestling Federation (1986–1995) ===
==== Can-Am Connection (1986–1987) ====
In October 1986, Martel returned to the WWF, with his tag team partner Tom Zenk. They were billed as The Can-Am Connection. The Can-Am Connection had been formed by Martel in the Montreal-based Lutte Internationale in 1986. Zenk was the boyfriend of Martel's sister-in-law, and had been introduced to Martel in the AWA by Curt Hennig. They also worked for All Japan Pro Wrestling in the fall of 1986. The Can-Am Connection with their youthful looks and high energy in-ring performances quickly garnered the affection of fans, and they looked likely to win the WWF Tag Team Title in the near future. At WrestleMania III in front of 93,173 fans at the Pontiac Silverdome, The Cam-Am connection defeated Ace Cowboy Bob Orton and The Magnificent Muraco in the opening match, when Martel pinned Muraco with a flying cross-body helped by what commentator Gorilla Monsoon called "a schoolboy trip from behind" by Zenk. They split shortly afterward; Zenk claimed Martel had secretly negotiated an individual contract worth three times more than his partner's contract (traditionally, tag teams are paid roughly equal salaries).

Martel strongly disagreed. In Mad Dogs, Midgets and Screw Jobs, he said: “Ever since I had been fired by Jim Barnett, I decided not to discuss money matters with other wrestlers . . . I did the same thing with Tom, and he put it in his head, or some other people put it in his head, that I made more than him. But as far as Vince was concerned, if you were in a tag team, you earned the same amount of money.” He also claimed Zenk "...was overwhelmed by it all... Wrestling is very hard on your body. Hard on you also mentally. It's hard physically. Tom wasn't mentally or physically hard as I thought he would be."

==== Strike Force (1987–1989) ====
At the time of Zenk's departure, The Can-Am Connection was in a feud with The Islanders (Haku and Tama); Zenk's departure was worked into the feud, with the Islanders claiming that Zenk was a quitter and abandoned Martel because he knew they could never beat them. In July 1987, Martel defeated both Haku and Tama in singles competition. Then on the August 15, 1987, episode of Superstars of Wrestling after Martel defeated Barry Horowitz, he was jumped by The Islanders. Tito Santana, who was doing commentary in the Spanish broadcast booth, ran to the ring to help Martel fight off his attackers. Martel and Santana then formed a tag team called Strike Force. The team were played off as good looking pretty boys (a storyline that came directly from the Can-Am Connection), even using the theme called "Girls In Cars", which was originally made for the Can-Am Connection. The name Strike Force came from Santana's promise that as a team they would, "be striking (The Islanders) with force." Martel immediately came up with the team's name based on this.

After winning their feud with The Islanders, Strike Force immediately challenged The Hart Foundation (Bret "Hitman" Hart and Jim "The Anvil" Neidhart) for the WWF World Tag Team Title. Strike Force won the titles on an episode of Superstars after Martel made Neidhart submit to a Boston crab. Strike Force would hold the titles for five months, defending primarily against the Hart Foundation and the Islanders, before losing to Demolition (Ax and Smash) at WrestleMania IV in Atlantic City when Smash pinned Martel as a result of Martel being hit on the back of the neck by Ax using Mr. Fuji's cane as a weapon when Martel had Smash in the Boston crab and the referee was distracted by Santana beating up Mr. Fuji on the ring apron.

Shortly afterward, Martel (kayfabe) took time off due to injuries sustained in a title rematch against Demolition at a Prime Time Wrestling taping in Oakland, California, on June 1, 1988 (aired July 11). Smash hit Martel with a steel chair, then Demolition performed their "Demolition Decapitation" finisher on him at ringside, leaving him unconscious on the floor. On the June 18 Superstars, it was announced he suffered back injuries and a concussion. In the storyline, he briefly retired due to these injuries. In reality, he was granted leave from the WWF and took six months off to help care for his severely ill wife.

Before returning to the WWF Martel returned briefly to the WWC where he defeated Kamala. Martel returned in January 1989 as a singles wrestler, before reforming Strike Force with Santana at WrestleMania V to face The Brain Busters (Arn Anderson and Tully Blanchard). During the match, Santana accidentally hit Martel with his signature flying forearm smash and knocked him out of the ring. A frustrated Martel refused to tag in and walked away, leaving Santana to be beaten down and pinned. Immediately after the match in an interview with "Mean" Gene Okerlund who asked him how he could leave his partner "high and dry" and said that Strike Force was "supposed to be a team, a team", an irate Martel said, "I'm sick and tired. I'm sick and tired of him. You know, I was doing great as a singles wrestler, but no, Mr. Tito wants to ride my coattails some more. You saw his timing was off". Then angrily addressing Santana he said "You're lucky that being the gentleman that I am that I just walked off. That could have been a lot worse for you Tito Santana."

Following his heel turn, Martel acquired Slick as his manager. He feuded with Santana on and off over the next two years, losing to him in the finals of the 1989 King of the Ring tournament, then defeating him at The Main Event IV taping on October 30, 1990 (aired November 23). As 1989 came to a close, Martel's association with Slick quietly ended.

==== The Model (1989–1995) ====
In late 1989, Martel adopted a narcissistic gimmick, as the Model. Just before the 1989 Survivor Series (where in a continuation of their feud, Martel pinned Santana in the opening elimination match of the night), he introduced his own (fictional) brand of cologne called Arrogance, which he carried in a large atomizer and sprayed in the eyes of his opponents to blind them. He wore a turquoise sweater tied around his neck to the ring (later replaced by a turquoise sportcoat), with a large lapel pin that read "Yes, I am a model." Martel made his pay-per-view singles match debut at WrestleMania VI at the Skydome in Toronto, where he defeated Koko B. Ware via submission with his signature Boston Crab.

Martel's most high-profile feud during his stint as the Model was with Jake "The Snake" Roberts, sparked when he blinded Roberts with Arrogance on "The Brother Love Show" in October 1990. Martel and Roberts captained opposing teams at the Survivor Series. "The Visionaries" (Martel, The Warlord and Power and Glory) defeated The Vipers (Roberts, Superfly Jimmy Snuka and The Rockers) in a 4-0 clean sweep, the first time this had happened in Survivor Series history. In the 1990 Survivor Series (unlike previous editions), the heel survivors faced off against the babyface survivors in a grand finale "Match Of Survival". There "The Visionaries" teamed with "The Million Dollar Man" Ted Dibiase to face Tito Santana, Hulk Hogan and WWF World Heavyweight Champion Ultimate Warrior. Martel was eliminated from the match after he got himself counted out by abandoning his team after receiving beatings from both Hogan and The Warrior. Martel continued to have the upper hand over Roberts in the 1991 Royal Rumble match, eliminating Roberts from the match en route to lasting (a then-record) 53 minutes, before being eliminated by the British Bulldog Davey Boy Smith. Roberts would ultimately get his revenge at WrestleMania VII, defeating Martel in a blindfold match. For the rest of 1991, Martel represented the WWF on Japanese tours for Super World Sports. In December 1991, he lost to Naoki Sano in a match to determine the inaugural SWS Junior Heavyweight Champion.

In early 1992, Martel began a feud with Tatanka, leading to WrestleMania VIII, where Tatanka pinned him. He went on to work against Santana on house shows that spring.

During that time he unsuccessfully challenged Bret Hart for the WWF Intercontinental Heavyweight Championship at UK Rampage (1992). Also that summer, Martel had a brief feud with Shawn Michaels, as both men sought the affections of Sensational Sherri. The feud ended with a chain of events that resulted in a double countout at SummerSlam 1992 held at the Wembley Stadium in London, England in front of what remains the SummerSlam record attendance of 80,355. The match carried a "no punching in the face" stipulation, mutually agreed upon and eventually disregarded by the two narcissistic heels.

Martel then resumed his rivalry with Tatanka by stealing his sacred eagle feathers, to add to his wardrobe. The feud was resolved at the 1992 Survivor Series, where Tatanka again defeated Martel and reclaimed the feathers.

Martel received somewhat of a major push from 1992-1993, reaching the final four of the 1993 Royal Rumble and facing the WWF champion, Bret Hart for the title on house shows. However, for the rest of 1993 until his departure, Martel mainly appeared on the lower undercard, and rarely on television, mostly on programs such as All-American Wrestling and Wrestling Challenge. However, at the September 27 Monday Night Raw taping, he was the co-winner (with Razor Ramon) of a battle royal (aired October 4) to decide the competitors in a match for the vacant Intercontinental Championship. He lost that match (aired the next week) to Ramon. After this, Martel began moving slightly up the card once again. Martel also briefly feuded with Bastion Booger, losing one of their matches when he got fed up with how Booger smelled and started spraying him with his Arrogance cologne. Martel also appeared at Survivor Series 1993 in a 4-4 elimination match, before he was eliminated by The 1-2-3 Kid, and the 1994 Royal Rumble as the 26th entrant before getting eliminated by his old rival Tatanka. Martel was set to appear in a 10-man tag team match at Wrestlemania X but the match was cancelled during the show due to the show running out of time. The match was later held two weeks and one day later on Monday Night Raw, with Martel's team victorious. This turned out to be his final WWF in-ring match.

In August 1994, Martel dropped out of the WWF picture and wasn't seen again until participating in the 1995 Royal Rumble (he was a substitute for Jim Neidhart, who was fired from WWF due to no-showing events). His final appearance came the following month at a house show in Montreal, as his wrestling career began to slow as Martel pursued a career in real estate.

In a shoot interview with RF video, Martel claimed that he and Don Callis were set to return to the WWF as 'The Supermodels' in 1997, before Callis eventually turned on him, and turning Martel face for the first time since he walked out on his former teammate Tito Santana during a tag team match against The Brain Busters at WrestleMania V in 1989. However, after a pay dispute with WWF owner Vince McMahon, Martel signed with World Championship Wrestling (WCW). Callis confirmed that he and Martel were set to debut as a team during an interview with WWE.com in 2015.

=== Other promotions (1994–1997) ===
In 1994, Martel worked for a few appearances for International World Class Championship Wrestling (IWCCW) where in one of the matches defeated his former partner Tito Santana on September 9.

After leaving WWF in 1995, Martel wrestled in the independent circuit in United States and Canada. He had a feud with Don Callis aka The Natural in Manitoba. Later that year he went to Germany to work for Catch Wrestling Association. He lost to Santana in a Texas Death match by count out for NWA New Jersey on October 14.

In 1996 he wrestled in Malaysia. In 1997, Martel returned to Canada to team with Don Callis as the Supermodels, feuding with a young Edge and Christian, then known as Adam Impact and Christian Cage.

=== World Championship Wrestling (1998) ===
Martel debuted for WCW in 1998 on the January 5 episode of Nitro, defeating Brad Armstrong in his debut. Martel feuded with Booker T for the World Television Championship, failing to win it at Souled Out before winning the championship on the February 16 episode of Nitro. Martel's comeback was cut short during his rematch with Booker T at SuperBrawl VIII on February 22, when he landed badly on a throw, hitting his leg on one of the ring ropes. He tore an inside ligament of his right knee, fractured his leg and suffered cartilage damage, effectively ending his in-ring career. He was originally booked to retain the Television Title in the match, intended to be a gauntlet match, by beating Booker and then Perry Saturn. Martel and Booker worked out a finish in the ring, and then Booker and Saturn worked the second half of the match entirely on the fly. Martel was out of action for several months.

During his recovery, he worked briefly as a French language announcer alongside Marc Blondin and Michel Letourneur for the French-language WCW programming that was airing in Europe.

After suffering another injury in his first match back on the July 13 episode of Nitro, against Booker T's Harlem Heat tag team partner (and real life older brother), Stevie Ray, Martel retired from the ring.

=== Hawaiian Islands Wrestling Federation (1999) ===
After WCW, Martel wrestled his last match in Kailua, Hawaii, for Hawaiian Islands Wrestling Federation defeating The Metal Maniac on March 23, 1999.

=== Retirement (1999–2007; 2026) ===
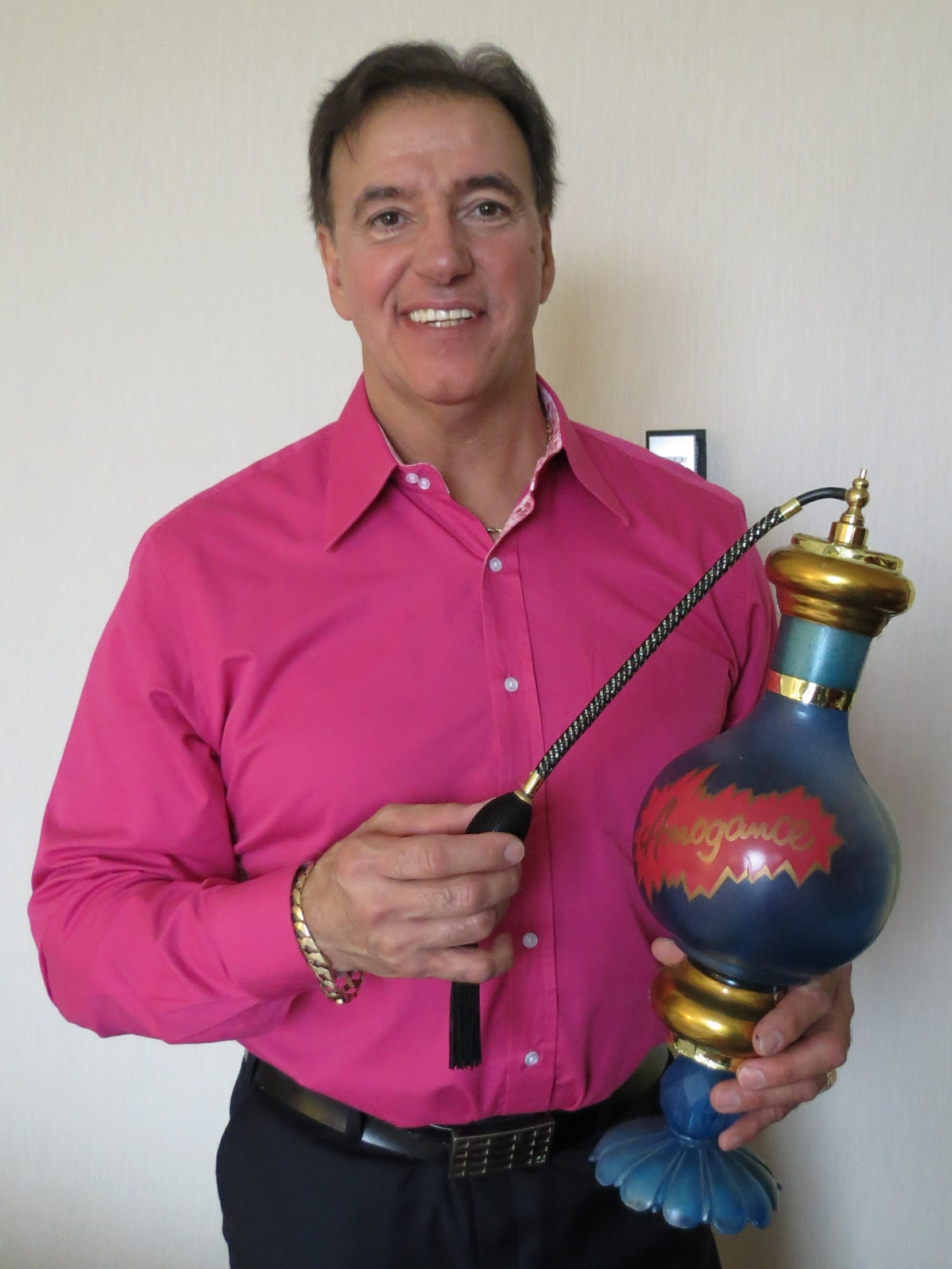
Martel in 2012

After retiring from the ring, Martel worked for WCW as a trainer, and as host of the French versions of WCW programming. Rick also manages commercial properties he invested in from his earnings when wrestling.

After the main event of a house show in Quebec City on May 3, 2003, then WWE Champion Brock Lesnar introduced Martel to the ring as a surprise, and shook his hand. Martel, who received a standing ovation from his home fans, said he was honoured to be associated with WWE and thanked the fans.

At WWE's Vengeance: Night of Champions pay-per-view in 2007, Martel, along with his former teammate Tony Garea, saved Jimmy Snuka and Sgt. Slaughter from a post-match attack at the hands of Deuce 'n Domino.

Martel is a playable character in WWE 2K18 and WWE 2K19, his first video game appearances since Showdown: Legends of Wrestling.

On March 19, 2026, Martel's manager Bertrand Hebert shot down long existing rumors that the reason that Martel wasn't in the WWE Hall of Fame was due to him turning down the induction. "No matter what Bruce Prichard said, he has never been offered the WWE Hall of Fame and if he’s offered the WWE Hall of Fame, I will make sure personally that he accepts the offer.” He went on to say that Martel has in the past declined offers to appear at other WWE events such as WrestleMania Axxess due to compensation and not being inducted into the Hall of Fame. “The idea of traveling to sign autographs, maybe for a few hours, for not a lot of money, and do all that traveling from Quebec City to San Francisco, was the big no-no for him and especially to return and to be asked to just sit around and have no official role or no invitation to the Hall of Fame. He didn’t think it was the right timing” Bertrand said also saying that Martel unlike many retired wrestlers invested wisely during his career and is financially secure in retirement therefore hasn't felt the need to travel around to do autograph signings for money. "He doesn’t need to do those appearances. And that’s hard for people in the business to understand.”

Martel made his first appearance on WWE television in nineteen years as a featured guest in the crowd during night two of SummerSlam on August 2nd, 2026.

== Championships and accomplishments ==
- 50th State Big Time Wrestling
  - NWA North American Heavyweight Championship (Hawaii version) (1 time)
- All Japan Pro Wrestling
  - World's Strongest Tag Determination League Fighting Spirit Award (1986) – with Tom Zenk
- American Wrestling Association
  - AWA World Heavyweight Championship (1 time)
- Cauliflower Alley Club
  - Lou Thesz Award (2011)
- George Tragos/Lou Thesz Professional Wrestling Hall of Fame
  - Lou Thesz Award (2027)
- Georgia Championship Wrestling
  - NWA Georgia Tag Team Championship (1 time) – with Tommy Rich
- Lutte Internationale
  - Canadian International Heavyweight Championship (1 time)
- NWA All-Star Wrestling
  - NWA Canadian Tag Team Championship (Vancouver version) (1 time) – with Roddy Piper
- NWA New Zealand
  - NWA British Commonwealth Heavyweight Championship (New Zealand version) (3 times)
- New England Pro Wrestling Hall of Fame
  - Class of 2011
- Pacific Northwest Wrestling
  - NWA Pacific Northwest Heavyweight Championship (1 time)
  - NWA Pacific Northwest Tag Team Championship (3 times) – with Roddy Piper
- Pro Wrestling Illustrated
  - Ranked No. 48 of the 500 best singles wrestlers during the "PWI Years" in 2003
  - Ranked No. 70 of the 100 best tag teams during the PWI years with Tito Santana in 2003
- Professional Wrestling Hall of Fame
  - Class of 2015
- Stampede Wrestling
  - Stampede International Tag Team Championship (1 time) – with Lennie Hurst
- Universal Superstars of America
  - USA Heavyweight Championship (1 time)
- World Championship Wrestling
  - WCW World Television Championship (1 time)
- World Championship Wrestling
  - NWA Austra-Asian Tag Team Championship (1 time) – with Larry O'Dea
- World Wrestling Council
  - WWC North American Tag Team Championship (2 times) – with Pierre Martel (2)
- World Wrestling Federation
  - WWF Tag Team Championship (3 times) – with Tony Garea (2), and Tito Santana (1)
