= Tito Santana =

American professional wrestler (born 1953)

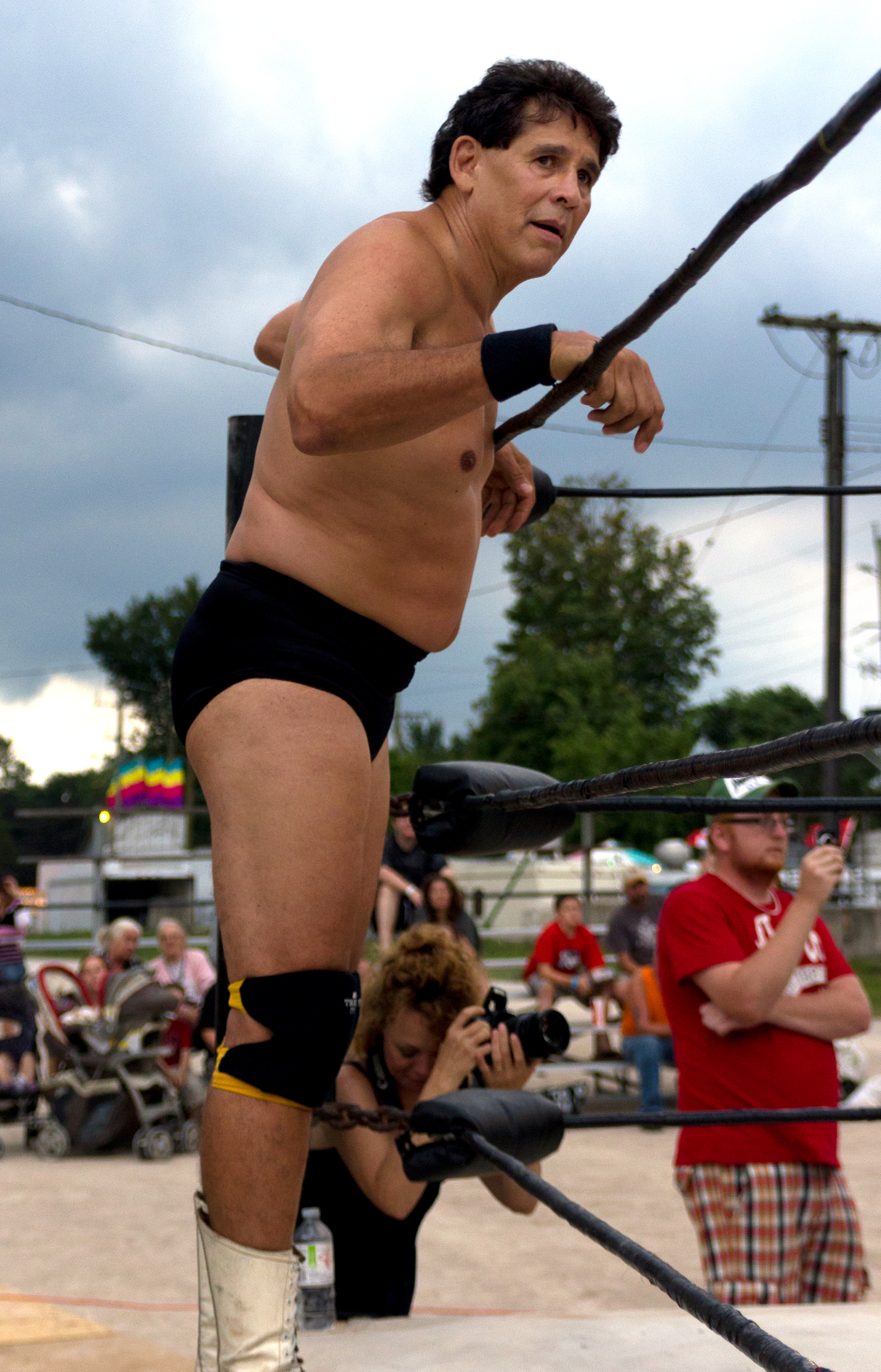
- Santana in 2011

Personal information
- Born: Merced Solís; May 10, 1953 (age 73) Mission, Texas, U.S.
- Spouse: Leah Solis (m. 1976)
- Children: 3

Professional wrestling career
- Ring names: Dino Santana; El Matador; Merced Solis; Richard Blood; Dick Blood; Tino Santana; Tito Santana
- Billed height: 6 ft 2 in (188 cm)
- Billed weight: 244 lb (111 kg)
- Billed from: "Tocula, Mexico"
- Trained by: Hiro Matsuda; Bob Orton
- Debut: 1977
- Retired: 2022
- Football career

No. 72
- Position: Tight end

Career information
- College: West Texas A&M
- NFL draft: 1975: undrafted

Career history
- Kansas City Chiefs (1975)*; BC Lions (1976)
- * Offseason or practice squad member only

Career CFL statistics
- Receptions: 17
- Rec. Yards: 329
- Touchdowns: 1

Merced Solis (born May 10, 1953), better known by the ring name Tito Santana, is an American professional wrestler, trainer, former Canadian football player, and retired school teacher.

Solis has stayed a babyface character his entire career and is best known for his appearances with the World Wrestling Federation between 1979 and 1993 (missing part of 1980 and returning in 1983) where he was a two-time WWF Intercontinental Heavyweight Champion and a two-time WWF Tag Team Champion with Ivan Putski in his first individual reign, and most notably with Rick Martel in his second individual reign. He also won the 1989 King of the Ring tournament and wrestled and won the first WrestleMania match against The Executioner and competed in the first nine, as well as helping bridge the gap between the 1980s "Rock 'n Wrestling Connection" era to the 1990s "New Generation" era.

Solis was inducted into the WWE Hall of Fame class of 2004 and the Professional Wrestling Hall of Fame class of 2013. During his time in the WWF, Solis, despite being born and raised in Mission, Texas, was billed from "Tocula, Mexico", which may be a misspelled reference to the city of Toluca. To this day, he still appears on the independent circuit and also worked as a schoolteacher until June 2023, when he retired from teaching.

== Early life ==
Solis was born in Mission, Texas on May 10, 1953. His paternal grandfather, Matias Cavazos, was a designer of the town's agricultural irrigation system. As a child, Solis and his family would travel annually to Illinois as seasonal farm workers, picking asparagus. He graduated from Mission High School, where he played football and basketball.

== Collegiate and professional football career ==
Solis attended West Texas State University, where he was a member of the Lambda Chi Alpha fraternity. He played tight end for the West Texas State Buffaloes. The team was quarterbacked by future professional wrestler Tully Blanchard, who would introduce Solis to the world of professional wrestling. After graduating, Solis was signed by the Kansas City Chiefs but cut during training camp, due to a poor performance in the 40-yard dash because of a twisted Achilles tendon two weeks before camp. He played a single season for the BC Lions of the Canadian Football League, appearing in 13 regular season games.

== Professional wrestling career ==
=== Early career (1977–1979) ===
After training under Hiro Matsuda and Bob Orton, Solis made his professional wrestling debut on February 23, 1977, for Championship Wrestling from Florida, losing to Crusher Verdu. In April, he joined Georgia Championship Wrestling (GCW) where he adopted the name "Richard Blood". In January 1978, he moved onto Mid Atlantic Championship Wrestling where he wrestled for a calendar year, he also toured with All Japan Pro Wrestling in October and early November 1978 as "Dick Blood". Reverting to his real name, Solis joined Western States Sports in Texas in 1979, winning the NWA Western States Tag Team Championship with Ted DiBiase.

=== World Wrestling Federation (1979–1980) ===
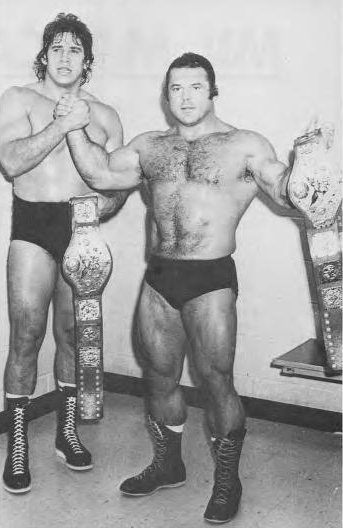
Santana (left) and Putski (right) display their WWF Tag Team Championships

Santana joined the World Wrestling Federation defeating Mike Hall in his debut match on Championship Wrestling on April 17, 1979. He teamed with Ivan Putski to defeat Johnny Valiant and Jerry Valiant for the WWF World Tag Team Championships at Madison Square Garden in October 1979. The duo held the titles for close to six months before losing to the Wild Samoans in April 1980. Santana left the WWF soon after, joining New Japan Pro-Wrestling for a two-month tour.

=== American Wrestling Association (1980–1982) ===
Santana wrestled in the American Wrestling Association (AWA) from 1980 to 1982. Matches he had in the AWA include two matches he had against Nick Bockwinkel in St Paul, Minnesota, on March 1, 1981, and in Winnipeg, Manitoba, on May 13, 1982 (Bockwinkel won both matches by cheating). Santana teamed with future tag team partner Rick Martel against the High Flyers on August 29, 1982, in St Paul. Santana and Martel lost the match.

=== Houston Wrestling (1981–1984) ===
Santana returned to Texas where wrestled for Houston Wrestling from 1981 to 1983. He won the Gold Cup Tournament when he defeated Nick Bockwinkel on November 1, 1981. In 1982, Santana feuded with Gino Hernandez. Left Houston after losing a 6-tag team Loser Leaves Town match teaming with Jim Duggan and Junkyard Dog against Butch Reed, Nikolai Volkoff and Barry Darsow.

=== Georgia Championship Wrestling (1982–1983) ===
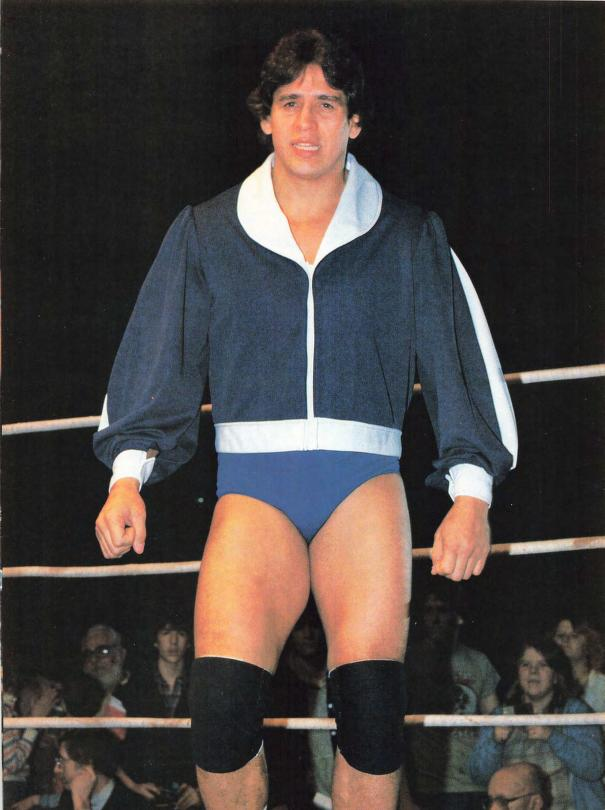
Santana circa 1983

Santana returned to GCW in July 1982. He teamed with Terry Gordy to unsuccessfully challenge The Samoans (Afa and Sika) for the NWA National Tag Team Championship on two occasions. On April 2, 1983, Santana also fought Larry Zbyszko for the NWA National Heavyweight Championship in a losing effort.

=== Mid-South Wrestling (1983) ===
In 1983, Santana worked for Mid-South Wrestling. He participated in the North American title tournament in March defeating Matt Borne in the first round and lost to Kendo Nagasaki. He feuded with The Super Destroyer.

=== Return to WWF (1983–1993) ===
==== Intercontinental Heavyweight champion (1983–1987) ====
Santana returned to the WWF in 1983, making his televised return on the May 14 episode of Championship Wrestling by defeating José Estrada. Being brought in for TV tapings only, Santana continued to wrestle for GCW until July when he signed for the WWF full time. In 1984, Santana fought the Iron Sheik to a double-disqualification for the WWF World Heavyweight Championship at the Philadelphia Spectrum. He then engaged in a lengthy feud with WWF Intercontinental champion, the Magnificent Muraco. Santana finally won the title on February 11, 1984, becoming the first Mexican-American wrestler to win the Intercontinental championship. After successfully defending the title against Muraco, Santana was targeted by Greg "The Hammer" Valentine, and in September 1984 in London, Ontario, Canada, Valentine defeated Santana to win the title. Soon after, Valentine kayfabe injured Santana's knee and put Santana out of action for several months. Santana returned in December 1984 and set his sights on getting the Intercontinental title back from Valentine. During this time, he started using Valentine's finishing hold, the figure-four leglock and also wrestled in tag-team competition with Blackjack Mulligan. Santana wrestled at the first WrestleMania, at Madison Square Garden, in March 1985, and in the opening match defeated a masked wrestler known as The Executioner ("Playboy" Buddy Rose), making him submit to the figure four in 4:05. Santana made an appearance in the ring later in the card during the Intercontinental Heavyweight Championship match between Valentine and Santana's friend the Junkyard Dog. Wearing street clothes, Santana rushed to the ring to inform referee Dick Kroll that Valentine had used his feet on the ropes to help pin JYD. Despite having already called for the bell, Kroll restarted the match and an incensed Valentine was counted out as he did not get back into the ring to continue.

On Right After Wrestling, hosted by Arda Ocal and Jimmy Korderas, Santana stated that he was somewhat disappointed with being in the first match at the original WrestleMania in 1985. He also said that Vince McMahon later told Santana that his reason for putting him in the opening match was to kick the show off with a quality match, something he knew Santana, as a solid fan-favorite and former Intercontinental champion, would produce. Santana and Valentine went on to wrestle a memorable series of singles and tag team matches with neither gaining the upper hand. They wrestled in a variety of different types of matches such as regular title matches, no disqualification matches, and lumberjack matches. The pair also faced off in tag team competition with Santana teaming with The Junkyard Dog and Valentine teaming with Brutus Beefcake in a team that would become known as the Dream Team. Santana recaptured the Intercontinental championship from Valentine in a brutal steel cage match in Baltimore on July 6, 1985. After the match, Valentine, incensed over losing the belt, destroyed it by repeatedly bashing it against the steel cage, forcing the WWF to get a new Intercontinental title belt. In reality, however, the WWF had already made a new Intercontinental belt to go along with the new image they were trying to promote; smashing the old belt was seen as a way of moving forward with Santana having the honor of being the first to wear the new title belt. Santana would hold on to the title until February 8, 1986, when he lost it to "Macho Man" Randy Savage at the Boston Garden, after Savage knocked him out with a foreign object he had hidden in his tights that (supposedly) went unnoticed by referee Danny Davis.

Although Santana lost the Intercontinental title before the WWF's storyline that Davis was a corrupt official who favored the heels, the WWF used Santana losing the belt because of Davis' bias to include him in a six-man tag team match at WrestleMania III on March 29, 1987. Santana teamed with The British Bulldogs (Dynamite Kid and Davey Boy Smith) against the WWF tag team champions The Hart Foundation (Bret "Hitman" Hart and Jim "the Anvil" Neidhart) and their new partner, referee-turned-wrestler Davis, who was now known as "Dangerous" Danny Davis. Davis had also been the assigned referee when the Harts won the WWF Tag Team Championship from the Bulldogs in January 1987, allowing the Harts to double team Davey Boy throughout the entire match after their manager "the Mouth of the South" Jimmy Hart had knocked Dynamite out with his megaphone. The story for WrestleMania III was that the Bulldogs and Santana wanted revenge on Davis for him being responsible for them losing their respective titles. The Harts and Davis won the match when Davis used Jimmy Hart's megaphone to 'knock out' and pin Smith. Santana made a second appearance during Wrestlemania III when he came to the ring and attacked manager Slick after his man "the Natural" Butch Reed had defeated Koko B. Ware. Santana, in response to previous attacks by Slick, tore the clothing from Slick who managed to scamper back to the locker room with his suit in tatters. Following this, Reed entered the ring to fight off Santana but was sent from the ring by a double dropkick from Santana and Ware.

==== Strike Force (1987–1989) ====
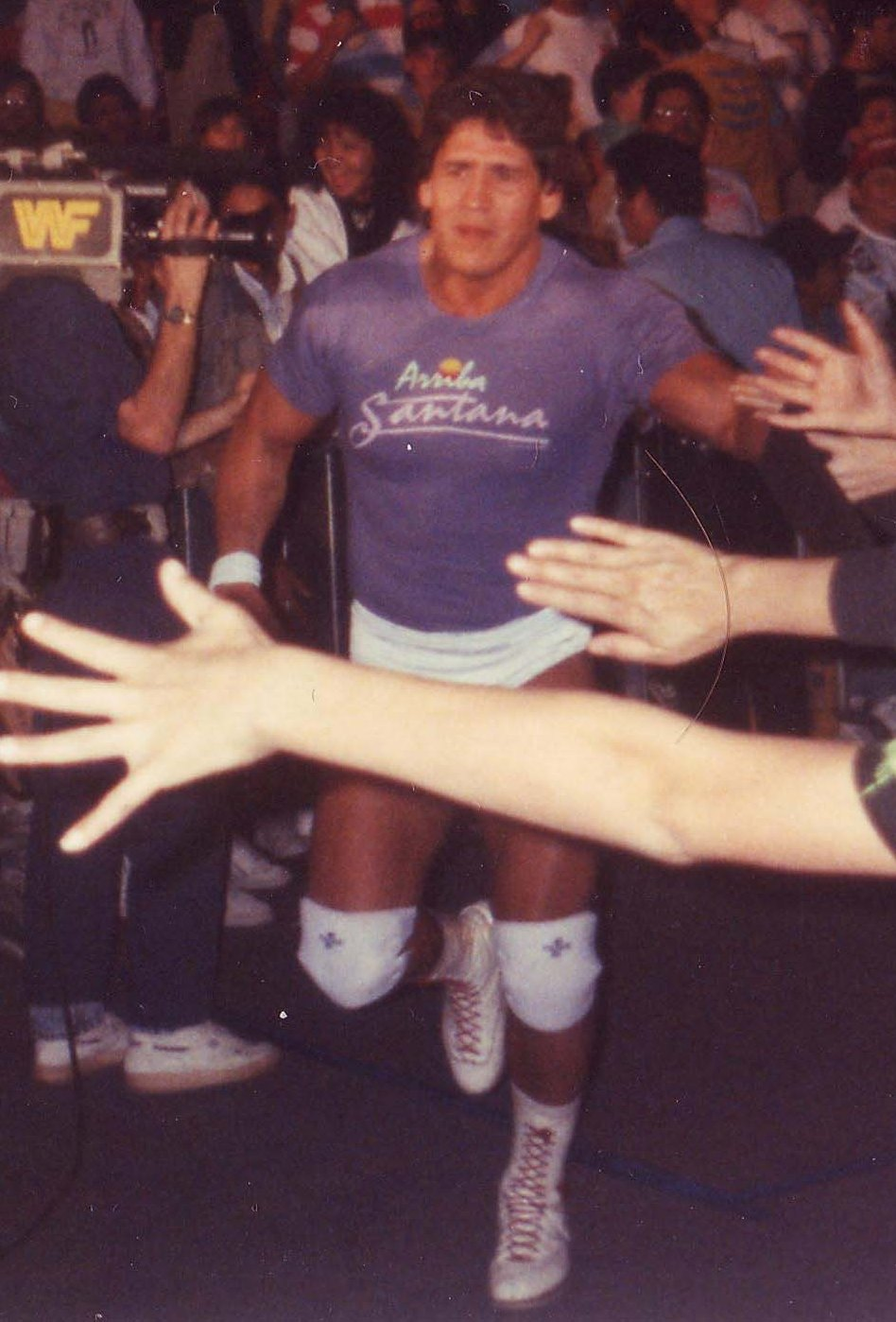
Santana making his way to the ring March 7, 1989

Tom Zenk abruptly left the company in July 1987, thus ending his Can-Am Connection partnership with Rick Martel. In response, Vince McMahon decided to pair Santana with Martel, forming the popular tag team Strike Force in August 1987. After feuding with the Islanders for a couple months, they defeated The Hart Foundation for the WWF Tag Team championship on October 27 when Martel made Jim Neidhart submit to a Boston crab. Strike Force held the titles for five months before losing to Demolition at Wrestlemania IV. Due to a neck injury inflicted on Martel (kayfabe) shortly after the loss, the team was inactive for several months (in reality, Martel was granted leave to tend to his wife who was seriously ill). Immediately after the injury, Santana introduced a new tag team to the WWF, The Powers of Pain (The Barbarian and The Warlord), two big, muscular, face-painted wrestlers whom he briefly managed. The Powers of Pain were introduced as mercenaries to help Martel and Santana gain revenge on Demolition for both the title loss and the injury to Martel. The Powers of Pain would later find more permanent management with The Baron before finally turning heel at the 1988 Survivor Series by stealing away Demolition's manager Mr. Fuji, leaving champion Demolition as babyfaces.

Martel returned at the Royal Rumble in 1989 and reunited with Santana. However, in their WrestleMania V match against The Brain Busters (Tully Blanchard and Arn Anderson), Martel turned on Santana during the match after accidentally being hit by Santana's Flying forearm smash. Martel refused to tag in and walked back to the dressing room, leaving Santana to face both opponents alone (the Busters then easily defeated Tito with a Spike piledriver). In an interview with "Mean" Gene Okerlund immediately following the match, Martel called Santana a loser and said he was sick and tired of carrying him. His feud with the newly heel Martel would last throughout 1989, with both men on opposing teams at both SummerSlam and Survivor Series. Although Martel fared better during the feud, Santana did defeat Martel in the finals of the 1989 King of the Ring tournament. Santana even allied with his former archenemies Demolition against Martel, defeating him and The Fabulous Rougeaus in a six-man tag match on June 22, 1989, in Hartford, Connecticut.

==== Intercontinental Heavyweight championship pursuits (1990–1991) ====
After Ultimate Warrior won the WWF World Heavyweight Championship from Hulk Hogan at WrestleMania VI and vacated the Intercontinental championship, Santana took part in an eight-man tournament to determine a new Intercontinental champion. Santana made it to the finals, where he lost to Mr. Perfect. Following that loss, Santana occasionally teamed with Koko B. Ware. At the 1990 Survivor Series, he teamed with Nikolai Volkoff and The Bushwhackers (Luke and Butch). He was the winner and sole survivor in the elimination-style match against Sgt. Slaughter, Boris Zhukov, and The Orient Express (Sato and Tanaka). As a result, Santana advanced to the final elimination match, teaming with Hulk Hogan and Ultimate Warrior against Martel, "The Million Dollar Man" Ted DiBiase, The Warlord, and Power and Glory (Hercules and Paul Roma). Santana would eliminate The Warlord with his flying forearm before eventually being pinned by DiBiase. Santana would then wrestle at WrestleMania VII, losing to The Mountie in a little over a minute after being hit in the stomach by The Mountie's electrified cattle prod. A month later lost to The Mountie again at Saturday Night's Main Event XXIX. Afterwards, Santana took a hiatus from the WWF and worked for Super World Sports in Japan.

==== El Matador (1991–1993) ====
After a brief hiatus and working in Japan, Santana returned in September 1991 with a new gimmick, a Spanish bullfighter gimmick nicknamed "El Matador" when he defeated Bob Bradley. He put together a string of victories, including a rare pinfall victory over The Undertaker in Barcelona on October 5. His first WrestleMania match under this gimmick was a loss to Shawn Michaels in the opening bout of WrestleMania VIII at the Hoosier Dome in Indianapolis. Santana wrestled under the "El Matador" gimmick through 1993, mainly defeating jobbers, while losing the majority of his matches against higher-level talent. This included a dark match loss to Papa Shango at SummerSlam which was held at the Wembley Stadium in London, England. Santana defeated friend and frequent tag team partner Virgil on a 1993 episode of Wrestling Challenge. As a sign of mutual respect between the two, both men embraced after the match. He stopped appearing on WWF programming in North America, but he continued working on the WWF Summer tour in Europe and the international house show circuit through the course of August–September. Santana, along with only Hulk Hogan, holds the unique distinction of appearing in the first nine WrestleManias, accumulating a 2–7 record during that time. Officially he is recognized only for the first eight WrestleMania matches. In his final in-ring WrestleMania appearance, he defeated Papa Shango at WrestleMania IX in the untelevised ("dark") opening match. Because of this he is officially recognized as having a 1–7 record. Santana continued to wrestle through the first half of 1993 following WrestleMania IX, facing Razor Ramon, Adam Bomb, and Papa Shango. His final match with the company was on August 13, 1993, in Wildwood, New Jersey, when he defeated Damien Demento.

=== International World Class Championship Wrestling (1991, 1994–1995) ===
During his hiatus from the WWF in 1991, Santana had a brief run in International World Class Championship Wrestling (IWCCW), where he feuded with Tony Atlas. On an IWCCW card in Brooklyn, New York, Atlas defeated Dusty Wolfe. After the bout, he openly challenged any of his fellow wrestlers to try to beat him. Santana immediately responded, charging out and dropkicking Atlas out of the ring. Following the event, Santana and Atlas scheduled a match for June 15 in Nassau in The Bahamas for the IWCCW title, where Santana sought to avenge his former tag team partner "Polish Power" Ivan Putski, whom Atlas had hung over the ropes previously. Santana had the upper hand in the bout until Atlas' manager Tony Rumble interfered by distracting and enraging Santana by repeatedly putting Atlas' foot on the rope. Santana then went after Rumble, pulled him onto the ring apron, and knocked him onto the floor. Atlas took the opportunity to blindside Santana with a pair of brass knuckles from behind. The referee saw this illegal attack, and disqualified Atlas.

==== Return and IWCCW Heavyweight Champion ====
After leaving ECW in 1993, Santana returned to IWCCW in 1994 where he wrestled some of his old WWF rivals such as Hercules Hernandez, Rick Martel, and Greg Valentine. During his second stint, he won the vacant IWCCW Heavyweight Championship with a tournament victory over Greg Valentine, who claimed the title less than a month later in a rematch. In IWCCW Santana resumed his feuds from the WWF with Rick Martel and Greg Valentine, and again wrestled Tony Atlas, who defeated him in a match in Yardville, New Jersey. Santana also feuded with Manny Fernandez, after Fernandez attacked Santana following Santana's victory over L.A. Gore.

=== NWA Eastern Championship Wrestling (1993) ===
Santana played a role in the formative years of ECW. Then known as Eastern Championship Wrestling, he won the ECW Heavyweight Championship on August 8, 1993, by defeating former WWF rival Don Muraco, but forfeited the championship later that year to Shane Douglas.

=== American Wrestling Federation (1994–1996) ===
During 1994 and 1996 Santana wrestled in the short-lived American Wrestling Federation (AWF). He was both the first and last AWF Heavyweight Champion, defeating Bob Orton, Jr. in a tournament final for the inaugural belt in November 1994, and losing and regaining the title from Orton on the same night in October 1996. Santana was generally considered the top babyface of the company, with Orton as its top heel).

=== Second return to the WWF (1997–1998) ===
In April 1997, Santana returned to the WWF as a commentator for the Spanish announce table. He called Monday Night Raw, as well as PPV events. In November 1997, he made on-air appearances as El Matador in the Karate Fighters Holiday Tournament, facing Carlos Cabrera and Jerry Lawler. Santana was released in May 1998.

=== Regional Championship Wrestling (1997–2013) ===
On July 19, 1997, Santana lost by disqualification to "Playboy" Jonathon Luvstruk in the finals of the United States title tournament at RCW's Battleground event. On August 8, 2009, Santana defeated Jerome Hendrix at RCW's Rumblemania 6 event. On May 6, 2012, Santana defeated Tokyo Dragon in tournament final to become RCW champion at RCW's Rumblemania 8 event. On May 10, 2013, Santana and Tokyo Dragon defeated Mad Russian, Jack Molson, and Rich Rogers in a title vs. hair match. Santana cut Rogers's hair at RCW's Megabrawl 6 event.

=== World Championship Wrestling (2000) ===
On January 10, 2000, Santana made a one-time appearance in WCW. He defeated Jeff Jarrett in a Dungeon match on Nitro.

=== Independent circuit (1996–present) ===
Since 1996, Santana continues to make appearances on the independent circuit. On December 7, 1996, he defeated former WWF rival Bob Orton Jr. to win the USA Pro Heavyweight title. He would hold the title until March 11, 1999, when he left the promotion. On March 13, 2004, he was inducted to the WWE Hall of Fame class of 2004, with an induction speech by his WrestleMania VIII opponent Shawn Michaels. In September 2008, he was inducted into the Spanish Hall of Fame of Pro Wrestling (Salón del Catch). He defeated his former rival Greg Valentine for the IWA Heavyweight Championship at WrestleReunion 2 on August 27, 2005. A few weeks later he dropped the title back to Valentine.

On the November 15, 2010 "Old School" episode of Raw, he ring-announced Alberto Del Rio. On April 14, 2012, he made an appearance wrestling a match for Pro Wrestling Superstars against Shawn Spears defeating him with an inside cradle. In July 2012, Santana wrestled in Winnipeg MB for Canadian Westling Elite against Matt Fairlane, but was disqualified due to outside interference. He also embarked on a three-day tour of Saskatchewan, Canada with High Impact Wrestling Canada. He wrestled and defeated Jumpin' Joe by pinfall in Yorkton, SK on July 16, lost by disqualification to Rex Roberts at Pile O' Bones Rumble XVII on July 17, and then on July 18 defeated King Kash by pinfall.

On September 14, 2012, Santana made an unadvertised appearance for Chikara, when he entered the 2012 King of Trios tournament, teaming with Mihara and The Mysterious and Handsome Stranger, with the three losing to the Spectral Envoy (Frightmare, Hallowicked and UltraMantis Black) in their first round match. On December 4, 2012, the Professional Wrestling Hall of Fame and Museum announced Santana would be inducted into their Modern Category. The PWHF Induction took place on May 18, 2013. On April 19, 2014, Santana competed in a match with "The German Menace" Kraig Stagg on ECPW's iPPV "Super Showcase Saturday". His last match was on November 25, 2022, Santana defeated This Guy (Johnny Della Rocka) for BCW 49 in East Burwood, Victoria, Australia.

Santana was an invited guest to the premiere of WWE's revival of Saturday Night's Main Event on December 14, 2024, and was shown in the crowd.

== Other activities ==
Solis used to be a physical education teacher at Smalley Elementary School in Bound Brook, New Jersey, and taught Spanish at Eisenhower Middle School in Roxbury, New Jersey. Solis announced his retirement from teaching in June 2023, with his last day on June 15 that year.

== Personal life ==
Solis currently lives in New Jersey with his wife Leah. They have three sons: Matthew, Michael and Mark. Leah operated a hair salon in Succasunna-Kenvil, New Jersey until January 2022. When not competing in a wrestling match, Solis works as a trainer at the New Jersey–based promotion Independent Wrestling Federation (IWF).

His autobiography, Tito Santana's Tales From the Ring, was released in 2008. His independently released biography, Don't Call Me Chico, was released in 2019.

== Championships and accomplishments ==
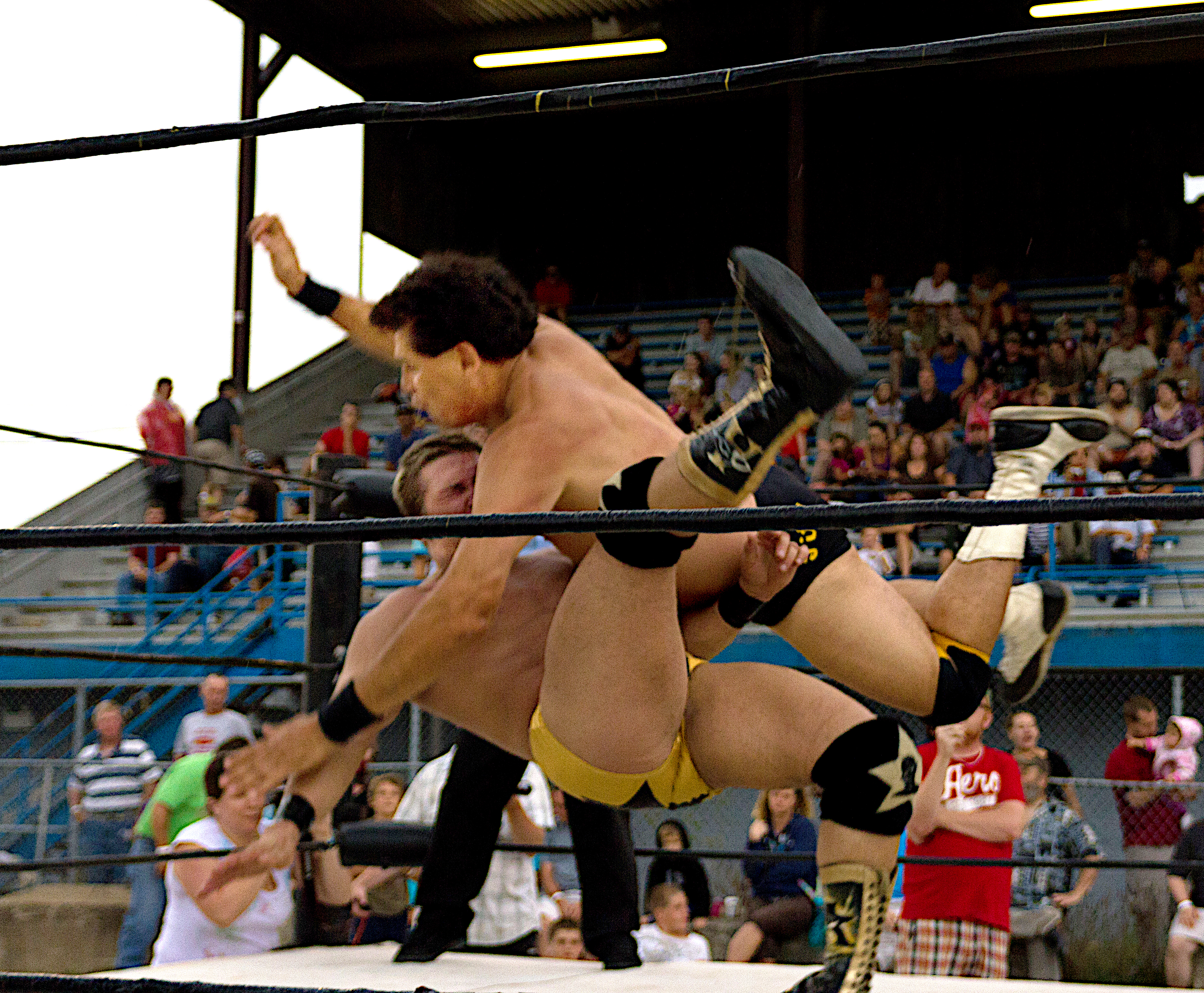
Santana delivering a Flying forearm smash on his opponent in 2011

- American Wrestling Federation
  - AWF Heavyweight Championship (2 times)
  - AWF Heavyweight Title Tournament (1994)
- Empire Wrestling Alliance
  - EWA Heavyweight Championship (1 time)
- Eastern Championship Wrestling
  - ECW Heavyweight Championship (1 time)
- Independent Association of Wrestling
  - IAW Television Championship (1 time)
- Independent Wrestling Federation
  - Royal Rumble (2016)
- International Professional Wrestling Hall of Fame
  - Class of 2025
- International World Class Championship Wrestling
  - IWCCW Heavyweight Championship (1 time)
- George Tragos/Lou Thesz Professional Wrestling Hall of Fame
  - Lou Thesz Award 2024
- NWA Western States Sports
  - NWA Western States Tag Team Championship (1 time) – with Ted DiBiase
- National Wrestling Alliance
  - Houston Wrestling Gold Cup Tournament (1981)
- National Wrestling Council
  - NWC Heavyweight Championship (1 time)
- New England Pro Wrestling Hall of Fame
  - Class of 2011
- Northern States Wrestling Alliance
  - NSWA Heavyweight Championship (1 time)
- Professional Wrestling Hall of Fame
  - Class of 2013
- Pro Wrestling Illustrated
  - PWI Tag Team of the Year award in 1979 – with Ivan Putski.
  - PWI ranked him # 51 of the 500 best singles wrestlers in the PWI 500 in 1995.
  - PWI ranked him # 93 of the 500 best singles wrestlers during the PWI Years in 2003.
  - PWI ranked him # 70 of the 100 best tag teams during the PWI Years with Rick Martel in 2003.
  - PWI ranked him # 92 of the 100 best tag teams during the PWI Years with Ivan Putski in 2003.
- USA Pro Wrestling
  - USA Pro Heavyweight Championship (1 time)
- Unified Championship Wrestling
  - UCW Heavyweight Championship (1 time)
- Universal Superstars of America
  - USA Tag Team Championship (1 time) – with Chris Michaels
- World-1
  - W1 Tag Team Championship (1 time) – with Travis Lee
- World Wrestling Federation/Entertainment
  - WWF Intercontinental Heavyweight Championship (2 times)
  - WWF Tag Team Championship (2 times) – with Ivan Putski (1), and Rick Martel (1)
  - King of the Ring (1989)
  - WWE Hall of Fame (Class of 2004)
- Other titles
  - IWA Heavyweight Championship (1 time)

== See also ==
- List of gridiron football players who became professional wrestlers
