= List of Lucha Libre AAA Worldwide tournaments =

Professional wrestling tournaments

Under its scripted format, Lucha Libre AAA Worldwide (AAA) has organized numerous professional wrestling tournaments, primarily featuring professional wrestlers from its own roster and occasionally involving talent from other professional wrestling promotions, including WWE, All Elite Wrestling (AEW), Total Nonstop Action Wrestling (TNA), Ring of Honor (ROH), Lucha Underground, and Pro Wrestling NOAH.

== Championship tournaments ==
=== Inaugural championship tournaments ===
No.	Championship	Winner	Tournament final		
No.	Championship	Winner	Event	Date	Location
1	AAA World Tag Team Championship	The Dark Family (Dark Cuervo and Dark Ozz)	Rey de Reyes	March 18, 2007 (Aired March 25)	Naucalpan, Mexico
2	AAA Mega Championship	El Mesías	Verano de Escándalo	September 16, 2007 (Aired October 7)	Guadalajara, Jalisco, Mexico
3	AAA World Mini-Estrella Championship	Mini Charly Manson	Verano de Escándalo	September 14, 2008 (September 21)	Zapopan, Jalisco, Mexico
4	AAA World Cruiserweight Championship	Alex Koslov	Sin Limite	May 21, 2009 (Aired May 31)	Aguascalientes, Mexico
5	AAA World Trios Championship	Los Perros del Mal (Damián 666, Halloween, and X-Fly)	Triplemania XIX	June 18, 2011	Mexico City, D.F., Mexico
6	AAA Fusión Championship	Fénix	Rey de Reyes	March 17, 2013 (Aired April 4)	Monterrey, Nuevo León, Mexico

==== Inaugural AAA World Tag Team Championship Tournament ====
This tag team tournament was held to crown the inaugural AAA World Tag Team Champions. The tournament features 16 teams competing in a league format. It began on the October 20, 2006 episode of Sin Limite. Teams were awarded three points for a victory, one point for a draw, and zero points for a loss. The four teams with the highest number of points accumulated advanced to the tournament final at Sin Limite: Rey de Reyes on March 18, 2007. The tournament winners and inaugural champions were The Dark Family (Dark Cuervo and Dark Ozz).

Tournament information

Matches
Team won the match (3 points)
Match ended in a draw (1 point)
Team lost the match (0 points)

First round match results
Event	Venue	Team 1		Team 2		Time	Ref.
Sin Limite; October 20, 2006	Auditorio Arteaga; Queretaro, Queretaro, Mexico	Los Barrio Boys (Alan and Decnis)	0	The Dark Family (Dark Cuervo and Dark Ozz)	3	—N/a	
Sin Limite; October 20, 2006	Auditorio Arteaga; Queretaro, Queretaro, Mexico	Charly Manson and Pirata Morgan	3	The Mexican Powers (Juventud Guerrera and Psicosis)	0	—N/a	
Sin Limite; October 22, 2006 (Aired November 19)	Plaza de Toros Pepeillo Martínez; Salamanca, Guanajuato, Mexico	El Oriental and Máscara Divina	3	Guapos VIP (Chris Stone and Hator)	0	—N/a	
Sin Limite; October 22, 2006 (Aired November 19)	Plaza de Toros Pepeillo Martínez; Salamanca, Guanajuato, Mexico	The Dark Family (Escoria and Espíritu)	0	The Mexican Powers (Crazy Boy and Joe Lider)	3	15:17	
Sin Limite; November 13, 2006 (Aired November 26)	Plaza de Toros Revolución; Irapuato, Guanajuato, Mexico	Real Fuerza Aerea (El Ángel and Laredo Kid)	3	Vipers Revolution (Antifaz and Histeria)	0	12:10	
Sin Limite; November 13, 2006 (Aired November 26)	Plaza de Toros Revolución; Irapuato, Guanajuato, Mexico	El Elegido and El Intocable	0	Guapos VIP (Alan Stone and Zumbido)	3	10:15	
Sin Limite; November 18, 2006 (Aired December 3)	Lienzo Charro Buenavista; Cuernavaca, Morelos, Mexico	Aliens and Gran Apache	0	Real Fuerza Aerea (Rey Cometa and Super Fly)	3	6:53	
Sin Limite; November 18, 2006 (Aired December 3)	Lienzo Charro Buenavista; Cuernavaca, Morelos, Mexico	El Alebrije and El Brazo	3	May Flowers and Pimpinela Escarlata	0	3:22	
Sin Limite; November 30, 2006 (Aired December 10)	Gimnasio Agustín Millán; Toluca, Mexico	El Oriental and Máscara Divina	3	The Mexican Powers (Crazy Boy and Joe Lider)	6	13:43	
Sin Limite; November 30, 2006 (Aired December 10)	Gimnasio Agustín Millán; Toluca, Mexico	Charly Manson and Pirata Morgan	3	The Dark Family (Dark Cuervo and Dark Ozz)	6	11:05	
Sin Limite; December 15, 2006 (Aired January 14, 2007)	Plaza de Toros de Chilpancingo; Chilpancingo de los Bravo, Guerrero, Mexico	Aliens and Gran Apache	3	Real Fuerza Aerea (El Ángel and Laredo Kid)	3	12:45	
Sin Limite; December 15, 2006 (Aired January 14, 2007)	Plaza de Toros de Chilpancingo; Chilpancingo de los Bravo, Guerrero, Mexico	May Flowers and Pimpinela Escarlata	0	Real Fuerza Aerea (Pegasso and Super Fly)	6	—N/a	
Sin Limite; January 13, 2007 (Aired January 21)	Plaza de Toros "El Pinal"; Teziutlan, Puebla, Mexico	Los Barrio Boys (Alan and Decnis)	3	The Mexican Powers (Juventud Guerrera and Psicosis)	0	9:14	
Sin Limite; January 13, 2007 (Aired January 21)	Plaza de Toros "El Pinal"; Teziutlan, Puebla, Mexico	The Dark Family (Escoria and Espíritu)	3	Guapos VIP (Alan Stone and Zumbido)	3	8:47	
Sin Limite; January 20, 2007 (Aired January 28)	Estadio José Aguilar y Maya; Guanajuato, Mexico	Aliens and Gran Apache	3	Guapos VIP (Chris Stone and Hator)	3	10:41	
Sin Limite; January 20, 2007 (Aired January 28)	Estadio José Aguilar y Maya; Guanajuato, Mexico	The Dark Family (Escoria and Espíritu)	6	Real Fuerza Aerea (Pegasso and Super Fly)	6	7:47	
Sin Limite; January 25, 2007	Gimnasio Agustín Millán; Toluca, Mexico	Los Barrio Boys (Alan and Decnis)	3	The Mexican Powers (Crazy Boy and Joe Lider)	9	12:49	
Sin Limite; January 25, 2007	Gimnasio Agustín Millán; Toluca, Mexico	May Flowers and Polvo de Estrellas	0	The Mexican Powers (Juventud Guerrera and Psicosis)	3	7:25	
Sin Limite; February 5, 2007 (Aired February 11)	Plaza de Toros Revolución; Irapuato, Guanajuato, Mexico	May Flowers and Pimpinela Escarlata	3	Real Fuerza Aerea (El Ángel and Laredo Kid)	3	9:52	
Sin Limite; February 5, 2007 (Aired February 11)	Plaza de Toros Revolución; Irapuato, Guanajuato, Mexico	El Oriental and Máscara Divina	3	Vipers Revolution (Antifaz and Histeria)	3	10:34	
Sin Limite; February 9, 2007 (Aired February 18)	Plaza de Toros El Relicario; Puebla, Puebla, Mexico	The Dark Family (Dark Cuervo and Dark Ozz)	9	Guapos VIP (Chris Stone and Hator)	3	4:18	
Sin Limite; February 9, 2007 (Aired February 18)	Plaza de Toros El Relicario; Puebla, Puebla, Mexico	Los Barrio Boys (Alan and Decnis)	3	Guapos VIP (Alan Stone and Zumbido)	6	—N/a	
Sin Limite; February 16, 2007 (Aired February 25)	Plaza de Toros La Macarena Uruapan; Uruapan, Michoacan, Mexico	The Dark Family (Escoria and Espíritu)	6	Real Fuerza Aerea (Pegasso and Super Fly)	9	5:17	
Sin Limite; February 16, 2007 (Aired February 25)	Plaza de Toros La Macarena Uruapan; Uruapan, Michoacan, Mexico	El Alebrije and El Brazo	3	The Mexican Powers (Crazy Boy and Joe Lider)	12	9:11	
Sin Limite; February 23, 2007 (Aired March 4)	Auditorio Arteaga; Santiago de Queretaro, Queretaro, Mexico	The Dark Family (Dark Cuervo and Dark Ozz)	12	El Alebrije and El Brazo	3	10:37	
Sin Limite; February 23, 2007 (Aired March 4)	Auditorio Arteaga; Santiago de Queretaro, Queretaro, Mexico	Charly Manson and Pirata Morgan	3	Guapos VIP (Alan Stone and Zumbido)	9	8:07	
Sin Limite; March 3, 2007 (Aired March 11)	Plaza de Toros La Concordia; Orizaba, Veracruz, Mexico	Los Barrio Boys (Alan and Decnis)	6	The Dark Family (Escoria and Espíritu)	6	9:37	
Sin Limite; March 3, 2007 (Aired March 11)	Plaza de Toros La Concordia; Orizaba, Veracruz, Mexico	Guapos VIP (Alan Stone and Zumbido)	10	Real Fuerza Aerea (Rey Cometa/Pegasso and Super Fly)	10	9:35	

Tournament final

Sin Limite: Rey de Reyes — March 18, 2007 (Aired March 25)
No.	Results	Stipulations
1	The Dark Family (Dark Cuervo and Dark Ozz) defeated Guapos VIP (Alan Stone and Zumbido), The Mexican Powers (Crazy Boy and Joe Lider), and Real Fuerza Aerea (Pegasso and Super Fly) (Note: Order of elimination: Guapos VIP, Real Fuerza Aerea, The Mexican Powers)	Four corners elimination tournament final

Standings
Team won the tournament
Team qualified to the tournament final

Tournament standings
Rank	Tag Team	Points	Matches
1	The Dark Family (Dark Cuervo and Dark Ozz)	12	4
1	The Mexican Powers (Crazy Boy and Joe Lider)	12	4
3	Guapos VIP (Alan Stone and Zumbido)	10	5
3	Real Fuerza Aerea (Pegasso (Note: Pegasso replaced Rey Cometa.) and Super Fly)	10	5
5	Los Barrio Boys (Alan and Decnis)	6	5
5	The Dark Family (Escoria and Espíritu)	6	5
7	Vipers Revolution (Antifaz and Histeria)	3	2
8	Aliens and Gran Apache	3	3
8	Charly Manson and Pirata Morgan	3	3
8	El Alebrije and El Brazo	3	3
8	El Oriental and Máscara Divina	3	3
8	Guapos VIP (Chris Stone and Hator)	3	3
8	The Mexican Powers (Juventud Guerrera and Psicosis)	3	3
8	Real Fuerza Aerea (El Ángel and Laredo Kid)	3	3
9	May Flowers and Pimpinela Escarlata (Note: Polvo de Estrellas replaced Pimpinela Escarlata in Flowers and Escaralata's third tournament match.)	3	4
10	El Elegido and El Intocable	0	1

==== Torneo Campeón De Campeones ====
The Torneo Campeón De Campeones (Spanish for "Champion of Champions Tournament") was held to crown the inaugural AAA Mega Champion, effectively unified the IWC World Heavyweight Championship, Grand Prix Championship Wrestling (GPCW) SUPER-X Monster Championship, Mexican National Heavyweight Championship, and UWA World Light Heavyweight Championship. The tournament field included the four reigning champions of the aforementioned titles and the number one contender to each championship. IWC World Heavyweight Champion El Mesías became the inaugural AAA Mega Champion upon defeating UWA World Light Heavyweight Champion Chessman in the tournament final.

==== Inaugural AAA World Mini-Estrella Championship Tournament ====
This 12-man tournament was held to crown the inaugural AAA World Mini-Estrella Championship. The event began on the July 20, 2008 taping of Sin Limite and culminted at Sin Limite: Verano de Escándalo on September 14. The tournament winner and inaugural AAA World Mini-Estrella Champion was Mini Charly Manson.

==== Inaugural AAA World Cruiserweight Championship Tournament ====
This 13-man tournament was held to crown the inaugural AAA World Cruiserweight Championship. The event occurred throughout Sin Limite episodes from March 20 to May 21, 2009 (aired on April 5 to May 31). The tournament winner and the inaugural champion was Alex Koslov.

==== Inaugural AAA World Trios Championship Tournament ====
This eight-team single-elimination tournament was held to crown the inaugural AAA World Trios Champions. It began on May 18, 2011 and culminated at Triplemanía XIX on June 18. The winners of the tournament and inaugural champions were Los Perros del Mal (Damián 666, Halloween, and X-Fly).

==== Inaugural AAA Fusión Championship Tournament ====
This 16-man single-elimination tournament was for the inaugural AAA Fusión Champion. The tournament began on the November 14, 2012 episode of Fusion (taped on November 3, 2012) and culminated at Fusion: Rey de Reyes on March 17, 2013 (aired on April 4). The tournament winner and inaugural champion was Fénix.

=== Other championship tournaments ===
==== AAA Campeón de Campeones Championship #1 Contender's Tournament (2000) ====
This #1 contender's tournament for the AAA Campeón de Campeones Championship was held on the July 30, 2000 episode of Sin Limite (taped on July 18) in Tamaulipas, Mexico. Héctor Garza won the tournament, earning the right to challenge the AAA Campeón de Campeones Champion Cibernético.

Tournament bracket

1st Round; Sin Limite; July 18, 2000 (Aired: July 30)
Electroshock	—
Heavy Metal	Win
Canek	—
Pirata Morgan	Win
Abismo Negro	Win
El Alebrije	—
Espectro Jr.	—
Héctor Garza	Win

Semifinals; Sin Limite; July 18, 2000 (Aired: July 30)
Heavy Metal	Win
Pirata Morgan	—
Abismo Negro	—
Héctor Garza	Win

Final; Sin Limite; July 18, 2000 (Aired: July 30)
Heavy Metal	—
Héctor Garza	Win

==== Mexican National Middleweight Championship Tournament (2005–2006) ====
This tournament for the Mexican National Middleweight Championship took place from October 14, 2005 to January 9, 2006. The tournament winner was Zumbido.

==== AAA World Mixed Tag Team Championship Tournament (2005) ====
This tournament for the vacant AAA World Mixed Tag Team Championship took place at Sin Limite: Guerra de Titanes on December 10, 2005 (aired on December 25) in Guadalajara, Jalisco, Mexico. The tournament winners were Cinthia Moreno and El Oriental.

==== AAA Mega Championship Tournament (2016) ====
This tournament was for the vacant AAA Mega Championship after previous champion El Patrón Alberto left AAA. The members of the winning team in the first round at Sin Limite: Guerra de Titanes on January 22, 2016 (aired on January 30) advanced to the final at Sin Limite: Rey de Reyes on March 23 (aired on April 2). The tournament winner and new champion was El Texano Jr..

==== AAA Latin American Championship Tournament (2026) ====
This tournament was for the vacant AAA Latin American Championship tournament after previous champion El Hijo del Vikingo suffered an injury. The first round consisted of four triple threat matches with each winner advancing to the fatal four-way final. The tournament began on July 11, 2026 (aired on the July 18 edition of Lucha Libre AAA) and concluded at Ola de Calor on August 30; the final was originally scheduled for Triplemanía 34. In the four-way tournament final, La Parka got the victory to win the vacant AAA Latin American Championship.

==== Rey Fénix World Cruiserweight Tournament ====
This upcoming tournament will determine Rey Fénix's challenger for the AAA World Cruiserweight Championship on the January 2, 2027, episode of Lucha Libre AAA. The first round will consist of four triple threat matches. The winners in the first round will compete in a fatal four-way match in the tournament final at Guerra de Titanes on December 19, 2026. The tournament will feature wrestlers from AAA and WWE's brands, Raw, SmackDown, and NXT.

== Rey de Reyes tournament ==
The Rey de Reyes (Spanish for "King of Kings") tournament is an annual tournament that was established in 1997 and is comparable to WWE's King of the Ring tournament. It traditionally consists of four-way elimination matches with four qualifiers and a final held in one night.The winner is presented with a sword, which some have carried with them for an entire year. In 2026, the Rey de Reyes tournament the winner also receives a future AAA Mega Championship match.

#	Year	Winner	Times won	Tournament final		Ref.
#	Year	Winner	Times won	Opponent(s)	Date	Ref.
1	1997	Latin Lover	1	Heavy Metal, Héctor Garza, and Octagón	February 21, 1997	
2	1998	Octagón	1	Cibernético, Latin Lover, and Perro Aguayo	March 1, 1998	
3	1999	Cibernético	1	Electroshock, Latin Lover, and Octagón	March 7, 1999	
4	2000	Abismo Negro	1	Charly Manson, Cibernético, and El Alebrije	March 5, 2000	
5	2001	La Parka Jr.	1	Abismo Negro, Heavy Metal, and Latin Lover	March 30, 2001	
6	2002	El Canek	1	Cibernético, Octagón, and Pirata Morgan	March 17, 2002	
7	2003	La Parka Jr.	2	Abismo Negro	March 16, 2003	
8	2004	Jeff Jarrett (Note: Jeff Jarrett's Rey de Reyes victory was initially stricken from AAA's records, after the promotion ended their relationship with Total Nonstop Action Wrestling (TNA). His win was eventually recognized again when their relationship resumed in 2010.)	1	Latin Lover	March 21, 2004	
9	2005	La Parka Jr.	3	Abismo Negro, Chessman, Cibernético, Jeff Jarrett, Konnan, and Latin Lover	March 11, 2005	
10 (Note: This was the only edition to feature trios matches.)	2006	Vampiro (Note: Vampiro was a member of Team AAA with La Parka and Octagón. Vampiro got the pinfall victory for his team so he was recognized as the Rey de Reyes winner.)	1	La Secta Cibernetica (Chessman, Cibernético, and Muerte Cibernetica), Team TNA (Konnan, Ron Killings, and Samoa Joe) and Los Guapos (Scorpio Jr., Shocker, and Zumbido)	March 10, 2006	
11	2007	La Parka Jr.	4	Abismo Negro, Fuerza Guerrera, Latin Lover, Octagón, and Rhino	March 18, 2007	
12	2008	El Zorro	1	Abismo Negro, Alan Stone, and Mr. Niebla	March 16, 2008	
13	2009	Electroshock	1	La Parka, Latin Lover, and Silver King	March 15, 2009	
14	2010	Chessman	1	Hernandez and Marco Corleone	March 12, 2010	
15	2011	Xtreme Tiger	1	Carlito Caribbean Cool, El Mesías, and L.A. Park	March 18, 2011	
16	2012	El Hijo del Perro Aguayo	1	Héctor Garza, Jack Evans, and L.A. Park	March 18, 2012	
17	2013	El Mesías	1	Canek and L.A. Park	March 17, 2013	
18	2014	La Parka Jr.	5	Black Warrior, El Hijo del Perro Aguayo, and El Zorro	March 16, 2014	
19	2015	El Texano Jr.	1	Aero Star, El Mesías, and Psycho Clown	March 18, 2015	
20	2016	Pentagón Jr.	1	La Parka and Villano IV	March 23, 2016	
21	2017	Argenis	1	Averno, Bengala, Chessman, El Elegido, Joe Líder, Niño Hamburguesa, La Parka, and Pimpinela Escarlata	March 19, 2017	
22	2018	Rey Escorpión	1	Bengala, El Hijo del Vikingo, and La Parka	March 4, 2018	
23	2019	Aero Star	1	Australian Suicide, El Hijo del Vikingo, Golden Magic, Jack Evans, Laredo Kid, Myzteziz Jr., Sammy Guevara, and Taurus	March 16, 2019	
24	2021	Laredo Kid	1	Abismo Negro Jr., Aero Star, Drago, El Hijo del Vikingo, El Texano Jr., Murder Clown, and Myzteziz Jr.	May 1, 2021	
25	2022	Psycho Clown	1	Bandido, Cibernético, Heavy Metal, and Laredo Kid	February 19, 2022	
26	2023	Sam Adonis	1	Bandido, El Hijo del Vikingo, and Pagano	February 5, 2023	
27	2024	El Hijo del Vikingo	1	El Texano Jr. and Laredo Kid	February 3, 2024	
28	2025	Niño Hamburguesa	1	DMT Azul, El Hijo de Dr. Wagner Jr., and El Mesías	March 22, 2025	
29	2026	El Grande Americano	1	La Parka, "The Original" El Grande Americano, and Santos Escobar	March 14, 2026	

== Copa Antonio Peña ==
The Copa Antonio Peña (Spanish for "The Antonio Peña Cup") was an annual professional wrestling tournament, as a tribute to Antonio Peña, the founder of AAA, who died on October 5, 2006. The tournament was part of the annual Héroes Inmortales (Spanish for "Immortal Heroes") event, originally named Antonio Peña Memorial Show, which is held annually around the anniversary of Peña's death. It consists of a gauntlet match featuring eight to 13 AAA wrestlers. The Cup was not defended like a championship and does not automatically give the winner a shot at the AAA Mega Championship.

#	Winner	Times won	Date	Location	Notes	Ref
1	Charly Manson	1	October 7, 2007	Naucalpan, Mexico	Defeated Konnan in the tournament final.	
2	El Mesías	1	October 24, 2008	Veracruz, Mexico	Defeated Dark Cuervo in the tournament final.	
3	Cibernético	1	September 26, 2009	Monterrey, Mexico	Won a 12-man battle royal by last eliminating Konan Big.	
4	Aero Star	1	October 1, 2010	Tamaulipas, Mexico	Won an eight-man torneo cibernetico by last eliminating Chris Stone.	
5	Electroshock	1	October 9, 2011	Monterrey, Mexico	Won a nine-man gauntlet match by last eliminating L.A. Park.	
6	El Texano Jr.	1	October 7, 2012	San Luis Potosí, San Luis Potosí, Mexico	Won a 13-man gauntlet match by last eliminating El Mesías. His win was later nullified.	
7	La Parka	1	October 18, 2013	Puebla, Puebla, Mexico	Defeated Chessman, El Hijo del Fantasma, and Fénix in a four-way elimination match.	
8	Myzteziz	1	October 12, 2014	San Luis Potosí, San Luis Potosí, Mexico	Won an eight-man lumberjack match.	
9	Taurus	1	October 4, 2015	San Luis Potosí, San Luis Potosí, Mexico	Won a ten-man battle royal by last eliminating La Parka.	
10	Pimpinela Escarlata	1	October 2, 2016	Monterrey, Mexico	Won a 12-man battle royal.	
11	El Hijo del Fantasma	1	October 1, 2017	San Luis Potosí, San Luis Potosí, Mexico	Won a 14-man battle royal to win the AAA Latin American Championship.	
12	Pagano	1	October 28, 2018	Puebla, Puebla, Mexico	Won a 10-man battle royal by last eliminating El Hijo del Fantasma.	
13	El Hijo del Vikingo	1	October 19, 2019	Orizaba, Veracruz, Mexico	Won an 11-man battle royal by last eliminating Taurus.	
14	Pimpinela Escarlata	2	October 9, 2021	Orizaba, Veracruz, Mexico	Won a nine-man battle royal by last eliminating Mamba.	
15	Chik Tormenta	1	October 1, 2023	Guadalajara, Jalisco, Mexico	Defeated Maravilla in the tournament final.	
16	Chik Tormenta	2	October 6, 2024	Zapopan, Jalisco, Mexico	Won a nine-man battle royal by last eliminating Mini Vikingo.	

== Reina de Reinas tournament ==
From its creation in 1999 to 2008, the AAA Reina de Reinas Championship was put on the line in the annual Reina de Reinas tournament. In 2009, the tournament was retired as the Reina de Reinas Championship became a standard championship. The tournament was brought back in 2012 and 2013. It was then retired for 11 years before it was brought back in 2024 but this edition of the tournament did not have the Reina de Reinas Championship at stake.

#	Winner	Times won	Tournament finals			Incoming champion
#	Winner	Times won	Opponent(s)	Event	Date	Incoming champion
1	Xochitl Hamada	1	Esther Moreno, Miss Janeth, and Rossy Moreno	Reina de Reinas	February 19, 1999	—N/a
2	Rossy Moreno	1	Martha Villalobos, Miss Janeth, and Xochitl Hamada	Sin Limite: Reina de Reinas	February 20, 2000	Esther Moreno
3	Lady Apache	1	Alda Moreno, Miss Janeth, Tiffany	Sin Limite: Reina de Reinas	February 17, 2001 (Aired February 25)	—N/a
4	Esther Moreno	1	Lady Apache (c), Martha Villalobos, and Miss Janeth	AAA	February 23, 2002	Lady Apache
5	Martha Villalobos (c)	1	Lady Apache	AAA	February 15, 2003	Martha Villalobos
6	Tiffany	1	Lady Apache (c)	Sin Limite	February 20, 2005 (Aired February 27)	Lady Apache
7	Miss Janeth	1	Cynthia Moreno, La Diabolica, and Martha Villalobos	Sin Limite: Reina de Reinas	February 18, 2006 (Aired February 26)	Tiffany
8	Tiffany	2	Miss Janeth (c), Cynthia Moreno, Faby Apache, Rossy Moreno, and Sexy Star	Sin Limite: Reina De Reinas	March 25, 2007 (Aired April 8)	Miss Janeth
9	Faby Apache	1	Ayako Hamada and Mary Apache	Sin Limite: Reina de Reinas	May 25, 2008; Aired June 1)	—N/a
The tournament was no longer held annually. The AAA Reina de Reinas Championship was treated like a standard championship.
10	Sexy Star (c)	1	Kaguya	The Virgin Mary Reina De Reinas (Note: This event was co-promoted by Pro Wrestling Wave.)	November 27, 2012	Sexy Star
11	Faby Apache	2	LuFisto, Mary Apache, and Taya	Sin Limite: Rey de Reyes	March 17, 2013 (Aired April 4)	—N/a
12	Sexy Star II (Note: This edition of the tournament was not for the AAA Reina de Reinas Championship) (Note: The 2023 edition of the tournament only featured five wrestlers in a five-way match.)	1	Chik Tormenta, Dalys, Lady Shani, and La Hiedra	Rey de Reyes	February 5, 2023	—N/a
13	Lady Shani	1	Faby Apache	Rey de Reyes	February 3, 2024	—N/a
(c) – denotes the reigning champion

=== Inaugural Reina de Reinas Tournament (1999) ===
The inaugural Reina de Reinas Tournament was held to crown the inaugural AAA Reina de Reinas Champion. The tournament took place at the Reina de Reinas event on February 19, 1999 and was won by Xochitl Hamada.

Tournament bracket

1st Round; Reina de Reinas; February 19, 1999
Alda Moreno	—
La Fugitiva	—
La Venus	—
Xochitl Hamada	Win
La Migala	—
Lady Discovery	—
Miss Janeth	Win
Princesa Sujei	—
La Nazi	—
Linda Star	—
Rossy Moreno	Win
Vicky Carranza	—
Esther Moreno	Win
La Briosa	—
Martha Villalobos	—
Sahori	—

Final; Reina de Reinas; February 19, 1999
Xochitl Hamada	Win
Miss Janeth	—
Rossy Moreno	—
Esther Moreno	—

=== Reina de Reinas Tournament (2000) ===
The 2000 edition of the Reina de Reinas Tournament took place at Sin Limite: Reina de Reinas on March 5, 2000 (taped on February 20). Esther Moreno entered the tournament as the reigning AAA Reina de Reinas Champion. The tournament was won by the new champion Rossy Moreno.

Tournament bracket

1st Round; Sin Limite: Reina de Reinas; February 20, 2000 (Aired: March 5)
Esther Moreno (c)	—
Estrellita	—
Martha Villalobos	Win
Metalica	—
La Briosa	—
La Chola	—
Rossy Moreno	Win
Sahori	—
Cynthia Moreno	—
La Fugitiva	—
Tiffany	—
Xochitl Hamada	Win
Alda Moreno	—
La Demoledora	—
La Migala	—
Miss Janeth	Win

Final; Sin Limite: Reina de Reinas; February 20, 2000 (Aired: March 5)
Martha Villalobos	—
Rossy Moreno	Win
Xochitl Hamada	—
Miss Janeth	—

=== Reina de Reinas Tournament (2001) ===
The 2001 edition of the Reina de Reinas tournament took place on the February 25, 2001, episode of Sin Limite (taped on February 17). The reigning AAA Reina de Reinas Champion Rossy Moreno was unable to compete in the tournament. The tournament was won by the new champion Lady Apache.

Tournament bracket

1st Round (Note: This was a battle royal.); Sin Limite: Reina de Reinas; February 17, 2001 (Aired: February 25)
Alda Moreno	Win
Cynthia Moreno	—
Estrellita	—
La Briosa	—
La Chola	—
La Demoledora	—
La Fugitiva	—
Lady Apache	Win
Lady Discovery	—
Lola Gonzalez	—
Martha Villalobos	—
Miss Janeth	Win
Sahori	—
Tiffany	Win

Final; Sin Limite: Reina de Reinas; February 17, 2001 (Aired: February 25)
Alda Moreno	—
Lady Apache	Win
Miss Janeth	—
Tiffany	—

=== Reina de Reinas Tournament (2002) ===
The 2002 edition of the Reina de Reinas tournament took place on February 23, 2002. Lady Apache entered the tournament as the reigning AAA Reina de Reinas Champion. The tournament was won by the new champion Esther Moreno.

Tournament bracket

1st Round (Note: This was a battle royal.); AAA; February 23, 2002
Cinthia Moreno	—
Esther Moreno	Win
Estrellita	—
La Chola	—
La Fugitiva	—
La Hechicera	—
Lady Apache (c)	Win
Martha Villalobos	Win
Miss Janeth	Win
Mujer Demente	—
Tiffany	—

Final; AAA; February 23, 2002
Esther Moreno	Win
Lady Apache (c)	—
Martha Villalobos	—
Miss Janeth	—

=== Reina de Reinas Tournament (2003) ===
The 2003 edition of the Reina de Reinas tournament took place on February 15, 2003. Martha Villalobos entered the tournament as the reigning AAA Reina de Reinas Champion. She retained the title by defeating Lady Apache in the tournament final.

Tournament bracket

1st Round; AAA; February 15, 2003		Final; AAA; February 15, 2003
		Martha Villalobos (c)	Win
		Lady Apache	—
Fabi Apache	—	Lady Apache	—
Lady Apache	Win

=== Reina de Reinas Tournament (2005) ===
The 2005 edition of the Reina de Reinas tournament took place on the February 27, 2005, episode of Sin Limite (taped on February 20). Lady Apache entered the tournament as the reigning AAA Reina de Reinas Champion. The tournament was won by the new champion Tiffany.

Tournament bracket

1st Round (Note: This was a battle royal.); Sin Limite; February 20, 2005 (Aired: February 27)
Cynthia Moreno	—
Dark Angel	—
Estrellita	—
Faby Apache	—
Golden Girl	—
La Chola	—
Lady Apache (c)	Win
Martha Villalobos	—
Nikki Roxx	—
Poly Star	—
Princesa Blanca	—
Princesa Sujei	—
Simply Luscious	—
Tiffany	Win
Veronica	—

Final; Sin Limite; February 20, 2005 (Aired: February 27)
Lady Apache (c)	—
Tiffany	Win

=== Reina de Reinas Tournament (2006) ===
The 2006 edition of the Reina de Reinas tournament took place on the February 26, 2006, episode of Sin Limite: Reina de Reinas (taped on February 18). Tiffany entered the tournament as the reigning AAA Reina de Reinas Champion. The tournament was won by the new champion Miss Janeth.

Tournament bracket

1st Round (Note: This was a battle royal.) (Note: Order of elimination: La Hechicera, Mujer Demente, Lady Rabbit, Josseline, Lola Gonzalez, La Chola, Tiffany (c), Estrellita); Sin Limite: Reina de Reinas; February 18, 2006 (Aired: February 26)
Cynthia Moreno	Win
Estrellita	12:30
Josseline	—
La Chola	—
La Diabolica	Win
La Hechicera	—
Lady Rabbit	—
Lola Gonzalez	—
Martha Villalobos	Win
Miss Janeth	Win
Mujer Demente	—
Tiffany (c)	—

Final (Note: This was a four-way elimination match.) (Note: Order of elimination: Martha Villalobos, Cynthia Moreno, La Diabolica); Sin Limite: Reina de Reinas; February 18, 2006 (Aired: February 26)
Cynthia Moreno	—
La Diabolica	11:39
Martha Villalobos	—
Miss Janeth	Win

=== Reina de Reinas Tournament (2007) ===
The 2007 edition of the Reina de Reinas tournament took place on Sin Limite: Reina de Reinas on March 25, 2007 (aired on April 8). Miss Janeth entered the tournament as the reigning AAA Reina de Reinas Champion. The tournament was won by the new champion and the first two-time Reina de Reinas tournament winner Tiffany.

Tournament bracket

1st Round; Sin Limite: Reina de Reinas; March 25, 2007 (Aired: April 8)
Cynthia Moreno	Win
Estrellita	—
Faby Apache	Win
Josseline	—
La Chola	—
La Diabólica	—
Lady Rabbit	—
La Hechicera	—
Lola González	—
Martha Villalobos	10:57
Miss Janeth (c)	Win (Note: This was a Torneo cibernetico. Order of elimination: Mujer Demente, Josseline, Lady Rabbit, La Chola, La Hechicera, Lola González, Estrellita, Vicky Carranza, La Diabólica, Martha Villalobos)
Mujer Demente	—
Rossy Moreno	Win
Sexy Star	Win
Tiffany	Win
Vicky Carranza	—

Final; Sin Limite: Reina de Reinas; March 25, 2007 (Aired: April 8)
Cynthia Moreno	—
Faby Apache	11:13
Miss Janeth (c)	—
Rossy Moreno	—
Sexy Star	—
Tiffany	Win (Note: This was a six-way elimination match. Order of elimination: Sexy Star, Rossy Moreno, Cynthia Moreno, Miss Janeth, Faby Apache)

=== Reina de Reinas Tournament (2008) ===
The 2008 edition of the Reina de Reinas tournament took place on the June 1, 2008, episode of Sin Limite: Reina de Reinas (taped on May 25). Although Tiffany was the reigning AAA Reina de Reinas Champion, she did not defend her title in the tournament. The tournament was won by the new champion Faby Apache.

Tournament bracket

1st Round (Note: These were five-way elimination matches.); Sin Limite: Reina de Reinas; May 25, 2008 (Aired: June 1)
Ayako Hamada	Win (Note: Order of elimination: La Diabolica, Cynthia Moreno, Carlos Amano, Estrellita)
Carlos Amano	—
Cynthia Moreno	—
Estrellita	10:31
La Diabolica	—
Chikayo Nagashima	11:44
Martha Villalobos	—
Mary Apache	Win (Note: Order of elimination: Sonoko Kato, Sexy Star, Martha Villalobos, Chikayo Nagashima)
Sexy Star	—
Sonoko Kato	—
Akino	7:30
Dynamite Kansai	—
Faby Apache	Win (Note: Order of elimination: Vicky Carranza, Dynamite Kansai, Mayumi Ozaki, Akino)
Mayumi Ozaki	—
Vicky Carranza	—

Final (Note: This was a three-way elimination match.); Sin Limite: Reina de Reinas; May 25, 2008 (Aired: June 1)
Ayako Hamada	—
Mary Apache	6:23
Faby Apache	Win (Note: Order of elimination: Ayako Hamada, Mary Apache)

=== Reina de Reinas Tournament (2012) ===
The 2012 edition of the Reina de Reinas tournament took place on November 27, 2012 at The Virgin Mary Reina De Reinas, an event co-produced by Pro Wrestling Wave. Sexy Star entered the tournament as the reigning AAA Reina de Reinas Champion. She retained the title after defeating Kaguya in the tournament final.

Tournament bracket

1st Round; The Virgin Mary Reina De Reinas; November 27, 2012
Sexy Star (c)	Win
Jennifer Blake	11:11
Faby Apache	10:36
Kaguya	Win

Final; The Virgin Mary Reina De Reinas; November 27, 2012
Sexy Star (c)	Win
Kaguya	11:03

=== Reina de Reinas Tournament (2013) ===
The 2013 edition of the Reina de Reinas tournament was for the vacant AAA Reina de Reinas Championship. It began on the March 6, 2013 episode of Fusion (taped on March 1) and culminated at Sin Limite: Rey de Reyes on March 17, 2013 (aired on April 4). The tournament winner and new champion was Faby Apache.

=== Reina de Reinas Tournament (2024) ===
The 2013 edition of the Reina de Reinas tournament took place on February 3, 2024. This marked the only edition to not have the AAA Reina de Reinas Championship on the line. The tournament winner was Lady Shani.

== Lucha Libre World Cup ==
The Lucha Libre World Cup was an annual professional wrestling tournament held annually from 2015 to 2017 and in 2023. The first two editions featured trios matches in Mexico City, Mexico, while the third edition featured traditional tag team matches in Tokyo, Japan.

#	Year	Division	Winners	Date(s)	Location	Ref(s)
1	2015	—N/a	Dream Team (El Patrón Alberto, Myzteziz, and Rey Mysterio Jr.)	May 24, 2015	Mexico City, Mexico	
2	2016	Men	Team Lucha Underground (Brian Cage, Chavo Guerrero Jr. and Johnny Mundo)	June 3, 2016; June 5, 2016	Mexico City, Mexico	
3	2016	Women	Team Mexico (Faby Apache, Mari Apache, and Lady Apache)	June 3, 2016; June 5, 2016	Mexico City, Mexico	
4	2017	—N/a	Team Mexico AAA (Pagano and Psycho Clown)	October 9, 2017; October 10, 2017	Tokyo, Japan	
5	2023	Men	Team Mexico (Taurus, Pentagón Jr., and Laredo Kid)	March 19, 2023	Zapopan, Jalisco, Mexico	
6	2023	Women	Team United States (Deonna Purrazzo, Kamille, and Jordynne Grace)	March 19, 2023	Zapopan, Jalisco, Mexico	

== Lucha Capital ==
Lucha Capital (Spanish for "Capital Fight") was a Mexican seasonal professional wrestling streaming television series and tournament produced by Lucha Libre AAA Worldwide (AAA). The show premiered on October 31, 2018, on Facebook Watch. On October 9, 2019, AAA announced Season 2 of Lucha Capital.

== Torneo de Parejas ==
The Torneo de Parejas (Spanish for "Pairs Tournament") was a single-elimination tournament featuring various tag teams. The tournament occurred six times from 1993 to 2000.

=== List of Torneo de Parejas winners ===
#	Winners	Tournament final			
#	Winners	Date	Event	Location	Opponent
1	El Hijo del Santo and Octagón	November 11, 1993	AAA	Tijuana, Baja California, Mexico	Fuerza Guerrera and Heavy Metal
2	Jerry Estrada and La Parka	February 25, 1994 (Aired: March 12)	AAA	Poza Rica de Hidalgo, Veracruz, Mexico	Heavy Metal and Latin Lover
3	Latin Lover and Perro Aguayo	November 1, 1994 (Aired: December 24)	AAA	Saltillo, Coahuila, Mexico	Los Gringos Locos (Chicano Power and Misterioso)
4	Konnan and Máscara Sagrada Jr.	August 21, 1996 (Aired: September 8)	Sin Limite	Ciudad Nezahualcoyotl, Mexico	Cien Caras and Halcon Dorado Jr.
5	Chiva Rayada I and Chiva Rayada II	June 19, 1998	AAA	Puebla, Puebla, Mexico	Los Payasos (Coco Azul and Coco Rojo)
6	Los Vipers (Abismo Negro and Electroshock)	March 10, 2000 (Aired: March 19)	Sin Limite	Tijuana, Baja California, Mexico	Heavy Metal and Perro Aguayo Jr.

=== Torneo de Parejas (1993) ===
The inaugural Torneo de Parejas was held on November 11, 1993 in Tijuana, Baja California, Mexico. The winners were El Hijo del Santo and Octagón.

Tournament bracket

1st Round; AAA; November 11, 1993
El Hijo del Santo and Octagón	Win
Espectro Jr. and Karis La Momia	—
Huichol and La Parka	Win
Rey Misterio and Rey Misterio Jr.	—
Fuerza Guerrera and Heavy Metal	Win
Misterioso and El Torero	—
Blue Panther and Volador	—
La Pareja del Terror (Eddy Guerrero and Love Machine)	Win

Semifinals; AAA; November 11, 1993
El Hijo del Santo and Octagón	Win
Huichol & La Parka	—
Fuerza Guerrera and Heavy Metal	Win
La Pareja del Terror	—

Final; AAA; November 11, 1993
El Hijo del Santo and Octagón	Win
Fuerza Guerrera and Heavy Metal	—

=== Torneo de Parejas (February 1994) ===
The February 1994 edition of the tournament was held on February 25, 1994 (aired on March 12) in Poza Rica de Hidalgo, Veracruz, Mexico. The winners were Jerry Estrada and La Parka.

Tournament bracket

1st Round; AAA; February 25, 1994 (Aired: March 12)
El Satánico and Fishman	Win
Lizmark Jr. and Mascara Sagrada	—
Heavy Metal and Latin Lover	Win
La Pareja del Terror (Eddy Guerrero and Love Machine)	—
Blue Panther and Fuerza Guerrera	—
El Hijo del Santo and Octagón	Win
Jerry Estrada and La Parka	Win
Tiger Mask and Volador	—

Semifinals; AAA; February 25, 1994 (Aired: March 12)
El Satánico and Fishman	—
Heavy Metal and Latin Lover	Win
El Hijo del Santo and Octagón	—
Jerry Estrada and La Parka	Win

Final; AAA; February 25, 1994 (Aired: March 12)
Heavy Metal and Latin Lover	—
Jerry Estrada and La Parka	Win

=== Torneo de Parejas (November 1994) ===
The November 1994 edition of the tournament was held on November 1, 1994 (aired on December 24) in Saltillo, Coahuila, Mexico. The winners were Latin Lover and Perro Aguayo.

Tournament bracket

1st Round; AAA; November 1, 1994 (Aired: December 24)
El Fantasma and Mascara Sagrada	—
Fishman and Jerry Estrada	Win
Ice Killer and King Lion	—
Latin Lover and Perro Aguayo	Win
La Pareja del Terror (Eddy Guerrero and Love Machine)	Win
Los Gringos Locos (Chicano Power and Misterioso)	—
Lizmark and Volador	—
Los Gringos Locos (Konnan and Madonna's Boyfriend)	Win

Semifinals; AAA; November 1, 1994 (Aired: December 24)
Fishman and Jerry Estrada	—
Latin Lover and Perro Aguayo	Win
La Pareja del Terror	—
Los Gringos Locos (Konnan and Madonna's Boyfriend)	Win

Final; AAA; November 1, 1994 (Aired: December 24)
Latin Lover and Perro Aguayo	Win
Los Gringos Locos (Konnan and Madonna's Boyfriend)	—

=== Torneo de Parejas (1996) ===
The 1996 edition of the tournament was held on the September 8, 1996 episode of Sin Limite (taped on August 21) in Ciudad Nezahualcoyotl, Mexico. The winners were Konnan and Máscara Sagrada Jr..

Tournament bracket

1st Round; Sin Limite; August 21, 1996 (Aired: September 8)
Cien Caras and Halcon Dorado Jr.	Win
El Salsero and Octagón	—
El Hijo del Espectro and Pierroth Jr.	Win
Heavy Metal and Mosco de la Merced	—
Frisbee and La Parka	Win
Rey Misterio Jr. and Venum	—
Fishman and Kraken	—
Konnan and Máscara Sagrada Jr.	Win

Semifinals; Sin Limite; August 21, 1996 (Aired: September 8)
Cien Caras and Halcon Dorado Jr.	Win
El Hijo del Espectro and Pierroth Jr.	—
Frisbee and La Parka	—
Konnan and Mascara Sagrada Jr.	Win

Final; Sin Limite; August 21, 1996 (Aired: September 8)
Cien Caras and Halcon Dorado Jr.	—
Konnan and Mascara Sagrada Jr.	Win

=== Torneo de Parejas (1998) ===
The 1998 edition of the tournament was held on June 19, 1998 in Puebla, Puebla, Mexico. The winners were Chiva Rayada I and Chiva Rayada II.

Tournament bracket

1st Round; AAA; June 19, 1998
Black Demon and El Mexicano	Win
Charly Manson and La Parka Jr.	—
Abeja Africana and R-15	—
Chiva Rayada I and Chiva Rayada II	Win
Aracnofobia and Electroshock	Win
La Avispa and Venum	—
Los Payasos (Coco Azul and Coco Rojo)	Win
Máscara Sagrada Jr. and Óscar Sevilla	—

Semifinals; AAA; June 19, 1998
Black Demon and El Mexicano	—
Chiva Rayada I and Chiva Rayada II	Win
Aracnofobia and Electroshock	—
Los Payasos	Win

Final; AAA; June 19, 1998
Chiva Rayada I and Chiva Rayada II	Win
Los Payasos	—

=== Torneo de Parejas (2000) ===
The 2000 edition of the tournament was held on the March 19, 2000 episode of Sin Limite (taped on March 10) in Tijuana, Baja California, Mexico. The winners were Los Vipers (Abismo Negro and Electroshock).

Tournament bracket

1st Round; Sin Limite; March 10, 2000 (Aired: March 19)
Big Tiger Steele and Cibernético	Disqualification
Héctor Garza and La Parka	—
Heavy Metal and Perro Aguayo Jr.	Disqualification
El Texano and King Azteca	—
El Alebrije and Octagón	Win
Escorpion Negro and Pentagón	—
El Oriental and Kiss	—
Los Vipers (Abismo Negro and Electroshock)	Win

Semifinals; Sin Limite; March 10, 2000 (Aired: March 19)
Big Tiger Steele and Cibernético	—
Heavy Metal and Perro Aguayo Jr.	Disqualification
El Alebrije and Octagón	—
Los Vipers	Win

Final; Sin Limite; March 10, 2000 (Aired: March 19)
Heavy Metal and Perro Aguayo Jr.	—
Los Vipers	Win

== Young Stars Tag Team Tournament ==
=== Young Stars Tag Team Tournament (1994) ===
The inaugural Young Stars Tag Team Tournament was held on the February 13, 1994 episode of Sin Limite (taped on January 7.) in Morelia, Michoacan, Mexico. The winners were Rey Misterio Jr. and Winners.

Tournament bracket

1st Round; Sin Limite; January 7, 1994 (Aired: February 13)
Aullido and El Vikingo	—
Dragón de Oro and El Falcon	Win
Elvis and Super Caló	—
Marabunta and Reptil	Win
Matematico II and Matematico III	—
Picudo and Terremoto	Win
Juventud Guerrera and Psicosis	—
Rey Misterio Jr. and Winners	Win

Semifinals; Sin Limite; January 7, 1994 (Aired: February 13)
Dragón de Oro and El Falcon	—
Marabunta and Reptil	Win
Picudo and Terremoto	—
Rey Misterio Jr. and Winners	Win

Final; Sin Limite; January 7, 1994 (Aired: February 13)
Marabunta and Reptil	—
Rey Misterio Jr. and Winners	Win

=== Young Stars Tag Team Tournament (1997) ===
The 1997 edition of the Young Stars Tag Team Tournament was held on May 15, 1997 (aired on June 7) in Toluca, Mexico. The winners were Fuerza Guerrera and Mosco de la Merced.

Tournament bracket

1st Round; AAA; May 15, 1997 (Aired: June 7)
Fuerza Guerrera and Mosco de la Merced	Win
Kick Boxer and Octagón	—
Hector Garza and Super Nova	Win
May Flowers and Pentagón	—
Abismo Negro and Killer	—
Heavy Metal and Venum	Win
Fuego Magico and Mascara Sagrada	—
Loco Valentino and Picudo	Win

Semifinals; AAA; May 15, 1997 (Aired: June 7)
Fuerza Guerrera and Mosco de la Merced	Win
Hector Garza and Super Nova	—
Heavy Metal and Venum	Win
Loco Valentino and Picudo	—

Final; AAA; May 15, 1997 (Aired: June 7)
Fuerza Guerrera and Mosco de la Merced	Win
Heavy Metal and Venum	—

== Sporadic tournaments ==
=== Trios Tournament ===
This tournament was held on the February 19, 1995 episode of Sin Limite (taped on December 11, 1994) in Toluca, Mexico. The winners were Los Payasos (Coco Amarillo, Coco Azul, and Coco Rojo).

Tournament bracket

1st Round; Sin Limite; December 11, 1994 (Aired: February 19, 1995)
Blue Panther, Fuerza Guerrera, and Psicosis	—
Los Gringos Locos (Chicano Power, Konnan, and Misterioso)	Win
Heavy Metal, Latin Lover, and Perro Aguayo	—
Los Hermanos Dinamita (Cien Caras, Máscara Año 2000, and Universo 2000)	Win
El Fantasma, Lizmark Jr., and Tinieblas	—
El Hijo del Santo, Octagón, and Rey Misterio Jr.	Win
Lizmark, Super Muñeco, and Volador	—
Los Payasos (Coco Amarillo, Coco Azul, and Coco Rojo)	Win

Semifinals; Sin Limite; December 11, 1994 (Aired: February 19, 1995)
Los Gringos Locos	—
Los Hermanos Dinamita	Win
El Hijo del Santo, Octagon, and Rey Misterio Jr.	—
Los Payasos	Win

Final; Sin Limite; December 11, 1994 (Aired: February 19, 1995)
Los Hermanos Dinamita	—
Los Payasos	Win

=== Televisa Tag Team Tournament ===
The Televisa Tag Team Tournament was held at Sin Limite: Guerra de Titanes on November 11, 2003 (aired on December 14) in Naucalpan de Juarez, Mexico. The tournament was won by Latin Lover and Michael Shane.

=== Luchando por un Sueño tournament ===
The Luchando por un Sueño (Spanish for "Fighting for a Dream") began on the September 3, 2006 episode of Sin Limite (taped on August 17) and culminated at Sin Limite: Verano de Escándalo on September 17 (aired on September 24). The winner of the tournament was Laredo Kid.

=== Torneo de Atómicos ===
The Torneo de Atómicos (Spanish for "Atómicos Tournament") took place at Sin Limite: Verano de Escándalo on September 17, 2006. The winners of the tournament were Team TNA (A.J. Styles, Homicide, Low Ki, and Samoa Joe).

=== Campeonato Premier ===
The Campeonato Premier (Spanish for "Premier Championship") was held during the Lucha Libre Premier events from November 1 to November 28, 2010. It begin as a single-elimination tournament featuring eight tag teams. The final featured the two members of the winning tag team in the semifinal. The tournament was won by El Mesias.

Tournament bracket

1st Round; Lucha Libre Premier; November 1, 2010 (Aired: November 6–13)
Cibernético and Hernandez	Win
La Parka and Psycho Clown	—
El Mesias and Electroshock	Win
Extreme Tiger and LA Par-k	—
Chessman and Jack Evans	Win
Pimpinela Escarlata and Silver Cain	—
Alan Stone and El Elegido	—
Dr. Wagner Jr. and El Zorro	Win

Quarterfinals; Lucha Libre Premier; November 15, 2010
Cibernético and Hernandez	—
El Mesias and Electroshock	Win
Chessman and Jack Evans	—
Dr. Wagner Jr. and El Zorro	Win

Semifinal; Lucha Libre Premier; November 28, 2010
El Mesias and Electroshock	Win
Dr. Wagner Jr. and El Zorro	—

Final; Lucha Libre Premier; November 28, 2010
El Mesias	Win
Electroshock	—

=== Guitarra de Oro ===
The Guitarra de Oro (Spanish for "Golden Guitar") took place at Sin Limite: Ring & Rock StAAArs 6 on September 23, 2017 in Playa del Carmen, Quintana Roo, Mexico. The winner of the tournament was El Texano Jr..

Tournament bracket

1st Round; Sin Limite: Ring & Rock StAAArs 6 September 23, 2017
Aero Star	—
La Parka	—
Drago	Win
Mocho Cota Jr.	—
Carta Brava Jr.	—
Cuervo	—
Escoria	—
Marty Martinez	Win
Monster Clown	—
Murder Clown	—
Argenis	—
Australian Suicide	Win
Averno	—
Chessman	—
Super Fly	—
Eddie Edwards	—
El Hijo del Fantasma	—
El Texano Jr.	Win
EC3	—
James Storm	—

Final; Sin Limite: Ring & Rock StAAArs 6 September 23, 2017
Drago	—
Marty Martinez	—
Australian Suicide	—
El Texano Jr.	Win

=== Lucha Fighter ===
The Lucha Fighter event on April 18, 2020 featured three single-elimination tournaments for the male, female, and mini-estrella divisions. The men's tournament consisted of 16 participants with Pentagón Jr. as the winner. The women's tournament consisted of eight participants with Lady Shani as the winner. Lastly, the mini-estrella's tournament consisted of four participants with Dinastía as the winner.

Tournament brackets

Lucha Fighter Men's Tournament

1st Round; Lucha Fighter; April 18, 2020 (Aired: April 18–25)
Dr. Wagner Jr.	Win
Mr. Iguana	6:35
La Parka	Win
Laredo Kid	10:35
El Hijo del Vikingo	Win
Mamba	7:40
Niño Hamburguesa	8:26
Pentagón Jr.	Win
Chessman	Win
Myzteziz Jr.	7:11
Octagón Jr.	4:43
Pagano	Win
Dave the Clown	6:10
El Texano Jr.	Win
Drago	8:14
Psycho Clown	Win

Quarterfinals; Lucha Fighter; April 18, 2020 (Aired: May 2)
Dr. Wagner Jr.	7:45
La Parka	Win
El Hijo del Vikingo	9:44
Pentagón Jr.	Win
Chessman	Win
Pagano	6:59
El Texano Jr.	8:13
Psycho Clown	Win

Semifinals; Lucha Fighter; April 18, 2020 (Aired: May 9)
La Parka	7:31
Pentagón Jr.	Win
Chessman	9:11
Psycho Clown	Win

Final; Lucha Fighter; April 18, 2020 (Aired: May 9)
Pentagón Jr.	Win
Psycho Clown	10:00

Lucha Fighter Women's Tournament

1st Round; Lucha Fighter; April 18, 2020 (Aired: April 18–25)
Big Mami	Win
Vanilla	5:39
Hades	6:19
La Hiedra	Win
Keyra	7:13
Lady Maravilla	Win
Faby Apache	8:05
Lady Shani	Win

Semifinals; Lucha Fighter; April 18, 2020 (Aired: May 2)
Big Mami	9:30
La Hiedra	Win
Lady Maravilla	5:27
Lady Shani	Win

Final; Lucha Fighter; April 18, 2020 (Aired: May 9)
La Hiedra	6:10
Lady Shani	Win

Lucha Fighter Minis Tournament

1st Round; Lucha Fighter; April 18, 2020
Dinastía	Win
Octagoncito	8:49
Drago Kid	6:50
Laredo Boy	Win

Final; Lucha Fighter; April 18, 2020 (Aired: May 9)
Dinastía	Win
Laredo Boy	5:30

=== Copa Brazo de Plata ===
Copa Brazo de Plata (Spanish for "Silver Arm Cup") took place at Mascara O Caballera on December 26, 2021 and was won by El Hijo del Vikingo and Murder Clown.

Tournament bracket

1st Round; Mascara O Caballera; December 26, 2021
Chessman and Octagón Jr.	—
El Hijo del Vikingo and Murder Clown	Win
Drago and Niño Hamburguesa	—
Forastero and Tito Santana	Win

Final; Mascara O Caballera; December 26, 2021
El Hijo del Vikingo and Murder Clown	Win
Forastero and Tito Santana	—

=== Ruleta de la Muerte ===
The Ruleta de la Muerte (Spanish for "Roulette of Death") was a reverse single elimination tournament across the three nights of Triplemanía XXX. The tournament featured eight masked luchadors. The losers of each match were relegated to the next round. The tournament final was a Lucha de Apuestas Máscara contra Máscara match. In the final, Pentagón Jr. defeated and unmasked Villano IV.

=== Showcenter Tournament ===
The Showcenter Tournament consisted of a men's tournament and a women's tournament. The men's tournament featured six wrestlers with three-way matches in the first round. The winner of the men's tournament was Laredo Kid. The women's tournament featured eight wrestlers with four-way matches in the first round. The winner of the women's tournament was La Hiedra.

Showcenter Men's Tournament

1st Round; Showcenter; November 23, 2022
Laredo Kid	Win
Toscano	—
Villano V Jr.	—
El Hijo del Vikingo	Win
Puma King	—
Taurus	—

Final; Showcenter; November 23, 2022
Laredo Kid	Win
El Hijo del Vikingo	18:49

Showcenter Women's Tournament

1st Round; Showcenter; November 23, 2022
Artemiz	—
La Hiedra	Win
Lady Shani	—
Sexy Star	—
Chik Tormenta	Win
Dulce Canela	—
Lady Flammer	—
Zeuxis	—

Final; Showcenter; November 23, 2022
La Hiedra	Win
Chik Tormenta	7:42

== See also ==
- List of WWE tournaments
