= List of WWE tournaments =

List of tournaments held by WWE

Under its scripted format, WWE has organized numerous professional wrestling tournaments, primarily featuring professional wrestlers from its own roster and occasionally involving talent from other professional wrestling promotions.

== Championship tournaments ==
=== Inaugural championship tournaments ===
No.	Championship	Winner	Tournament final			Ref
No.	Championship	Winner	Event	Date	Location	Ref
1	WWE European Championship	The British Bulldog	Raw	February 26, 1997 (Aired March 3)	Berlin, Germany	
2	WWF Light Heavyweight Championship (Note: First introduced for the Universal Wrestling Association, but the WWF recognizes Michinoku as the inaugural champion.)	Taka Michinoku	D-Generation X: In Your House	December 7, 1997	Springfield, MA	
3	Undisputed WWF Championship (Note: This was a tournament held to unify the WWF and World Championships.)	Chris Jericho	Vengeance	December 9, 2001	San Diego, CA	
4	WWE Tag Team Championship	Chris Benoit and Kurt Angle	No Mercy	October 20, 2002	North Little Rock, AR	
5 (Note: The tournament was titled, the "Gold Rush Tournament".)	NXT Championship	Seth Rollins	NXT	July 27, 2012 (Aired August 29)	Winter Park, FL	
6	NXT Tag Team Championship	British Ambition (Adrian Neville and Oliver Grey)	NXT	January 31, 2013 (Aired February 13)	Winter Park, FL	
7	NXT Women's Championship	Paige	NXT	June 20, 2013 (Aired July 24)	Winter Park, FL	
8	NXT Cruiserweight Championship	T. J. Perkins	Cruiserweight Classic	September 14, 2016	Winter Park, FL	
9	SmackDown Tag Team Championship	Heath Slater and Rhyno	Backlash	September 11, 2016	Richmond, VA	
10	United Kingdom Championship	Tyler Bate	United Kingdom Championship Tournament	January 15, 2017	Blackpool, Lancashire, England	
11	NXT UK Women's Championship	Rhea Ripley	NXT UK	August 26, 2018 (Aired November 28)	Birmingham, England	
12	NXT UK Tag Team Championship	Grizzled Young Veterans (James Drake and Zack Gibson)	TakeOver: Blackpool	January 12, 2019	Blackpool, Lancashire, England	
13	NXT UK Heritage Cup	A-Kid	NXT UK	November 26, 2020	London, England	
14	World Heavyweight Championship	Seth "Freakin" Rollins	Night of Champions	May 27, 2023	Jeddah, Saudi Arabia	
15	WWE Speed Championship	Ricochet	Speed	April 26, 2024 (Aired May 3)	Cincinnati, OH	
16	WWE Women's Speed Championship	Candice LeRae	Speed	October 4, 2024 (Aired October 9)	Nashville, TN	
17	WWE Women's United States Championship	Chelsea Green	Saturday Night's Main Event	December 14, 2024	Uniondale, NY	
18	WWE Women's Intercontinental Championship	Lyra Valkyria	Raw	January 13, 2025	San Jose, CA	
19	WWE ID Championship	Cappuccino Jones	GCW Presents The ID Showcase	August 1, 2025	Rutherford, NJ	

=== Vacant championship tournaments ===
Legend
Tournament winner(s) did not win championship
Tournament was for an interim championship

==== Active championships ====
Tournament summary for active championships

WWE Championship

No.	Tournament Winner	Finals			Notes
No.	Tournament Winner	Event	Date	Location	Notes
1	Randy Savage	WrestleMania IV	March 27, 1988	Atlantic City, NJ	WWF president Jack Tunney refused to recognize Ted DiBiase as champion.
2 (Note: The tournament was titled, "Deadly Games WWF Championship Tournament".)	The Rock	Survivor Series	November 15, 1998	St. Louis, MI	
3	Rey Mysterio	Raw Supershow	July 25, 2011	Hampton, VA	Champion CM Punk left WWE.
4	Roman Reigns	Survivor Series	November 22, 2015	Atlanta, GA	Champion Seth Rollins suffered a knee injury.

WWE Intercontinental Championship

No.	Tournament Winner	Finals			Notes
No.	Tournament Winner	Event	Date	Location	Notes
1	Mr. Perfect	Superstars of Wrestling	April 23, 1990 (Aired May 19)	Austin, TX	Champion Ultimate Warrior vacated the title.
2	Marc Mero	Monday Night Raw	September 23, 1996	Hershey, PA	Champion Ahmed Johnson suffered (kayfabe) kidney injuries after Faarooq attacked him.
3	Owen Hart	Badd Blood: In Your House	October 5, 1997	St. Louis, MI	Champion Stone Cold Steve Austin suffered a neck injury.
4	Ken Shamrock	Raw Is War	October 12, 1998	Uniondale, NY	Champion Triple H suffered an injury.
5	Kofi Kingston	SmackDown	May 11, 2010 (Aired May 14)	Buffalo, NY	SmackDown General Manager Teddy Long fired champion Drew McIntyre and vacated the title after repeat attacks against Matt Hardy. Mr. McMahon overturned Long’s decision, nullifying Kingston’s title win.
6	AJ Styles	SmackDown	June 8, 2020 (Aired June 12)	Orlando, FL	Champion Sami Zayn refrained from competing during the COVID-19 pandemic; the title was vacated.

WWE United States Championship

No.	Tournament Winner	Finals			Notes
No.	Tournament Winner	Event	Date	Location	Notes
1	Eddie Guerrero	Vengeance	July 27, 2003	Denver, CO	Smackdown General Manager Stephanie McMahon revived the title after two years of inactivity.
2	Bobby Roode	SmackDown Live	January 16, 2018	Laredo, TX	Champion Dolph Ziggler proclaimed that the fans did not deserve him and abandoned the title as he walked out. On the night of the semifinals, Roode challenged Jinder Mahal to hold the final that same night.

World Tag Team Championship (current)

No.	Tournament Winner	Finals			Notes
No.	Tournament Winner	Event	Date	Location	Notes
1 (Note: The tournament was titled, "Tag Team Eliminator".)	Bray Wyatt and Matt Hardy	Raw	April 16, 2018	Hartford, CT	Champions Braun Strowman and 10-year old Nicholas vacated the titles due to Nicholas' fourth-grade schedule. Raw General Manager Kurt Angle announced The Bar vs. the tournament winners for the vacant titles at the Greatest Royal Rumble.

WWE Women's Championship (current)

No.	Tournament Winner	Finals			Notes
No.	Tournament Winner	Event	Date	Location	Notes
1	Chelsea Green	SummerSlam	August 2, 2026	Minneapolis, MN	Champion Rhea Ripley suffered an injury.

WWE Women's Tag Team Championship

No.	Tournament Winner	Finals			Notes
No.	Tournament Winner	Event	Date	Location	Notes
1	Aliyah and Raquel Rodriguez	Raw	August 29, 2022	Pittsburgh, PA	Champions Naomi and Sasha Banks were suspended indefinitely.

NXT Women's Championship

No.	Tournament Winner	Finals			Notes
No.	Tournament Winner	Event	Date	Location	Notes
1	Charlotte	TakeOver	May 29, 2014	Winter Park, FL	NXT Commissioner John Bradshaw Layfield vacated the title because champion Paige could not defend both the NXT Women's and Divas Championship.
2	Tiffany Stratton	Battleground	May 28, 2023	Lowell, MA	Champion Indi Hartwell suffered a leg injury and was drafted to Raw.

==== Defunct championships ====
Tournament summary for defunct championships

WWE Women's Championship (1956–2010)

No.	Tournament Winner	Finals			Notes
No.	Tournament Winner	Event	Date	Location	Notes
1	Alundra Blayze	All American Wrestling	December 13, 1993 (Aired December 26)	Poughkeepsie, NY	The title was reinstated after three years of inactivity.
2	Lita	Cyber Sunday	November 5, 2006	Cincinnati, OH	Champion Trish Stratus retired from wrestling.

World Tag Team Championship (1971–2010)

No.	Tournament Winner	Finals			Notes
No.	Tournament Winner	Event	Date	Location	Notes
1	The 1–2–3 Kid and Bob Holly	Royal Rumble	January 22, 1995	Tampa, FL	Champions Diesel and Shawn Michaels disbanded as a tag team.
2	The Bodydonnas (Skip and Zip)	WrestleMania XII	March 31, 1996	Anaheim, CA	Billy Gunn of champions The Smokin' Gunns suffered a neck injury.
3	Owen Hart and The British Bulldog	Raw Is War	July 7, 1997	Edmonton, Alberta, Canada	Failed to win the title against "Stone Cold" Steve Austin and Dude Love on Raw Is War on July 14.

ECW World Championship

No.	Tournament Winner	Finals			Notes
No.	Tournament Winner	Event	Date	Location	Notes
1	Johnny Nitro	Vengeance: Night of Champions	June 24, 2007	Houston, TX	Champion Bobby Lashley vacated the title after being drafted to Raw. The final was originally Chris Benoit vs. CM Punk but Benoit no showed the event (due to the Benoit family tragedy) and was replaced by Nitro.

World Heavyweight Championship (2002-2013)

No.	Tournament Winner	Finals			Notes
No.	Tournament Winner	Event	Date	Location	Notes
1 (Note: The tournament was titled, "Championship Chase Tournament".)	Edge	SmackDown	May 6, 2008 (Aired May 9)	London, Ontario, Canada	Failed to win title against The Undertaker at Judgment Day.

Divas Championship

No.	Tournament Winner	Finals			Notes
No.	Tournament Winner	Event	Date	Location	Notes
1	Maryse	Raw	February 22, 2010	Indianapolis, IN	Champion Melina suffered an injury.

NXT Cruiserweight Championship

No.	Tournament Winner	Finals			Notes
No.	Tournament Winner	Event	Date	Location	Notes
1	Cedric Alexander	WrestleMania 34	April 8, 2018	New Orleans, LA	Champion Enzo Amore was suspended and released due to allegations of sexual harassment and sexual assault, the title was vacated.
2	El Hijo del Fantasma	NXT	May 27, 2020 (Aired June 3)	Winter Park, FL	This round-robin tournament was for the interim title after champion Jordan Devlin was unable to defend the title due to COVID-19 travel restrictions.

NXT United Kingdom Championship

No.	Tournament Winner	Finals			Notes
No.	Tournament Winner	Event	Date	Location	Notes
1	Tyler Bate	NXT UK	July 7, 2022	London, England	Champion Ilja Dragunov suffered an injury.

==== Tournament brackets ====
===== WWF Tag Team Championship Tournament (1997) =====
Tournament bracket

1st Round; Raw Is War; June 16–23, 1997
Nation of Domination (Faarooq and D'Lo Brown)	Pinfall
Vader and The Undertaker	6:00
The Godwinns (Henry O. Godwinn and Phineas I. Godwinn)	3:42
The Legion of Doom (Road Warrior Animal and Road Warrior Hawk)	Pinfall
New Blackjacks (Blackjack Windham and Blackjack Bradshaw)	3:35
Owen Hart and The British Bulldog	Pinfall
Jerry Lawler and Rob Van Dam	3:37
The Headbangers (Mosh and Thrasher)	Pinfall

Semifinals; Raw Is War; June 30, 1997
Nation of Domination	Pinfall
The Legion of Doom	3:02
Owen Hart and The British Bulldog	Pinfall
The Headbangers	4:07

Final; Raw Is War; July 7, 1997
Nation of Domination	6:50
Owen Hart and The British Bulldog	Countout
Championship Match; Raw Is War; July 14, 1997
Stone Cold Steve Austin and Dude Love	Pinfall
Owen Hart and The British Bulldog	9:00

===== WWE Championship Tournament (2011) =====
Tournament bracket

1st Round; Raw; July 18, 2011
Rey Mysterio	Pinfall
Dolph Ziggler	08:00
Jack Swagger	05:47
R-Truth	Pinfall
Kofi Kingston	Pinfall
Alberto Del Rio	04:24
Alex Riley	04:58
The Miz	Pinfall

Semifinals; Raw; July 18, 2011
Rey Mysterio	Pinfall
R-Truth	09:52
Kofi Kingston	12:47
The Miz	Pinfall

Final; Raw; July 25, 2011
Rey Mysterio	Pinfall
The Miz	13:10

== No. 1 Contender's tournaments ==
=== Summary ===
Legend
Tournament winner won championship match
Tournament winner lost championship match
Tournament winner won championship match but not the title
Tournament winner did not get their championship match

==== Active championships ====
No. 1 Contender's tournaments for active championships

WWE Championship

No.	Tournament Winner	Finals			Notes
No.	Tournament Winner	Event	Date	Location	Notes
1	Stone Cold Steve Austin	Raw	January 28, 2002	Richmond, VA	Lost to Chris Jericho at No Way Out.
2	John Cena	SmackDown	April 15, 2003 (Aired April 17)	Norfolk, VA	Lost to Brock Lesnar at Backlash.
3	John Cena	No Way Out	February 20, 2005	Pittsburgh, PA	Defeated John "Bradshaw" Layfield at WrestleMania 21.
4	John "Bradshaw" Layfield	SmackDown	April 26, 2005 (Aired April 28)	Birmingham, England	Lost to John Cena in an "I Quit" match at Judgment Day.
5	Triple H	Raw	February 20, 2006	Trenton, NJ	Lost to John Cena at WrestleMania 22.
6	AJ Styles	SmackDown	April 19, 2024	Pittsburgh, PA	Lost to Cody Rhodes at Backlash.
7	Sami Zayn	Saturday Night's Main Event	January 24, 2026	Montreal, Quebec, Canada	Lost to Drew McIntyre at the Royal Rumble.

World Heavyweight Championship (current)

No.	Tournament Winner	Finals			Notes
No.	Tournament Winner	Event	Date	Location	Notes
1	Penta	Raw	August 28, 2026 (Aired: August 31)	Cleveland, Ohio	This tournament featured luchadores from WWE's Raw and SmackDown divisions and their Mexican sister promotion Lucha Libre AAA Worldwide. Penta lost to Roman Reigns in the championship match on the September 14, 2026, episode of Raw in Mexico City, Mexico.

WWE Intercontinental Championship

No.	Tournament Winner	Finals			Notes
No.	Tournament Winner	Event	Date	Location	Notes
1	CM Punk	Armageddon	December 14, 2008	Buffalo, NY	Champion William Regal got disqualified on the January 5 episode of Raw.
2	Bad News Barrett	Raw	April 28, 2014	East Rutherford, NJ	Defeated Big E at Extreme Rules.
3 (Note: The tournament was titled, "SmackDown World Cup".)	Ricochet	SmackDown	December 2, 2022	Buffalo, NY	Lost to Gunther on SmackDown on December 16.
4	Jey Uso	Raw	September 9, 2024	Calgary, Alberta, Canada	Defeated Bron Breakker on Raw on September 23.

WWE United States Championship

No.	Tournament Winner	Finals			Notes
No.	Tournament Winner	Event	Date	Location	Notes
1	Santos Escobar	SmackDown	July 28, 2023	New Orleans, LA	Champion Austin Theory attacked Escobar prior to their title match; Rey Mysterio took his place.
2	Kevin Owens	SmackDown: New Year's Revolution	January 5, 2024	Vancouver, British Columbia, Canada	Lost to Logan Paul at the Royal Rumble.
3	LA Knight	SmackDown	February 28, 2025	Toronto, Ontario, Canada	Defeated Shinsuke Nakamura on SmackDown on March 7.

World Tag Team Championship

No.	Tournament Winner	Finals			Notes
No.	Tournament Winner	Event	Date	Location	Notes
1	Team Rhodes Scholars (Cody Rhodes and Damien Sandow)	Raw	October 22, 2012	East Rutherford, NJ	Defeated Team Hell No at Hell in a Cell via disqualification.
2	The Vaudevillains (Note: The finals match ended in a no contest after Enzo Amore suffered a concussion during the match that required immediate medical attention. WWE later awarded the match to The Vaudevillains, naming them the #1 contenders.) (Aiden English and Simon Gotch)	Payback	May 1, 2016	Rosemont, IL	Lost to The New Day (Big E and Xavier Woods) at Extreme Rules.
3 (Note: The tournament was titled, "RK-Bro-nament".)	Street Profits (Angelo Dawkins and Montez Ford)	Raw	December 27, 2021	Detroit, MI	Lost to RK-Bro at Day 1.
4	War Raiders (Erik and Ivar)	Raw	October 28, 2024	Hershey, PA	Lost to The Judgment Day (Finn Bálor and JD McDonagh) on Raw on November 25.

WWE Tag Team Championship

No.	Tournament Winner	Finals			Notes
No.	Tournament Winner	Event	Date	Location	Notes
1	The New Day (Big E, Kofi Kingston, and Xavier Woods)	SmackDown Live	August 7, 2018	Orlando, FL	Lost to the Bludgeon Brothers at SummerSlam.
2	Braun Strowman and Ricochet	SmackDown	February 3, 2023	Greenville, SC	Lost to The Usos on SmackDown on February 10.
3	The Street Profits (Angelo Dawkins and Montez Ford)	SmackDown	August 16, 2024	Orlando, FL	Lost to The Bloodline (Tama Tonga and Tonga Loa) on SmackDown on August 23.
4	Motor City Machine Guns (Alex Shelley and Chris Sabin)	SmackDown	October 25, 2024	New York City, NY	Defeated The Bloodline (Tama Tonga and Tonga Loa) that same night.

NXT Championship

No.	Tournament Winner	Finals			Notes
No.	Tournament Winner	Event	Date	Location	Notes
1	Finn Bálor	NXT TakeOver: Rival	February 11, 2015	Winter Park, FL	Lost to Kevin Owens on NXT on March 25.

NXT Women's Championship

No.	Tournament Winner	Finals			Notes
No.	Tournament Winner	Event	Date	Location	Notes
1	Jordynne Grace	NXT	June 24, 2025	Orlando, FL	Lost to Jacy Jayne at Evolution.

NXT North American Championship

No.	Tournament Winner	Finals			Notes
No.	Tournament Winner	Event	Date	Location	Notes
1 (Note: The tournament was titled, "Worlds Collide Tournament".)	Velveteen Dream	Worlds Collide	January 27, 2019 (Aired February 2)	Phoenix, AZ	The winner received a match for an NXT championship of their choice. Dream chose to challenge for Johnny Gargano's NXT North American Championship on NXT on February 20 and won the title.

NXT Tag Team Championship

No.	Tournament Winner	Finals			Notes
No.	Tournament Winner	Event	Date	Location	Notes
1	The Lucha Dragons (Kalisto and Sin Cara)	NXT	July 31, 2014 (Aired September 4)	Winter Park, FL	Defeated The Ascension at NXT TakeOver: Fatal 4-Way.
2	Axiom and Nathan Frazer	NXT	April 2, 2024	Orlando, FL	Lost to Baron Corbin and Bron Breakker at Stand & Deliver.
3	Los Americanos (Bravo Americano and Rayo Americano)	NXT	March 31, 2026	New York, NY	Lost to The Vanity Project (Brad Baylor and Ricky Smokes) at Stand & Deliver.

==== Defunct championships ====
No. 1 Contender's tournaments for defunct championships

World Heavyweight Championship (2002–2013)

No.	Tournament Winner	Finals			Notes
No.	Tournament Winner	Event	Date	Location	Notes
1 (Note: The tournament was titled, "Gold Rush".)	Edge	Raw	May 16, 2005	Omaha, NE	Lost to Batista on Raw on May 23.
2 (Note: The tournament was titled, "Championship Competition".)	Rey Mysterio	SmackDown	August 28, 2007 (Aired August 31)	Albany, NY	Lost to new champion Batista and previous champion The Great Khali at Unforgiven.
3 (Note: The tournament was titled, "Race to the Rumble".)	John "Bradshaw" Layfield	Raw	December 29, 2008	Manchester, NH	Lost to John Cena at the Royal Rumble.

ECW World Heavyweight Championship

No.	Tournament Winner	Finals			Notes
No.	Tournament Winner	Event	Date	Location	Notes
1 (Note: The tournament was titled, "ECW Homecoming".)	Ezekiel Jackson	ECW	January 12, 2010	Green Bay, WI	Lost to Christian at the Royal Rumble.

United Kingdom Championship

No.	Tournament Winner	Finals			Notes
No.	Tournament Winner	Event	Date	Location	Notes
1	Zack Gibson	United Kingdom Championship Tournament	June 18, 2018 (Aired June 25)	Kensington, London, England	Lost to Pete Dunne at the event.

Cruiserweight Championship

No.	Tournament Winner	Finals			Notes
No.	Tournament Winner	Event	Date	Location	Notes
1	Tony Nese	205 Live	March 19, 2019	Indianapolis, IN	Defeated Buddy Murphy at WrestleMania 35.

Undisputed WWE Tag Team Championship

No.	Tournament Winner	Finals			Notes
No.	Tournament Winner	Event	Date	Location	Notes
1 (Note: The tournament was titled, "Undisputed WWE Tag Team Championship Contender Series".)	New Catch Republic (Pete Dunne and Tyler Bate)	SmackDown	February 9, 2024	Charlotte, NC	Lost to The Judgment Day (Finn Bálor and Damian Priest) at Elimination Chamber.
2	New Catch Republic (Pete Dunne and Tyler Bate)	SmackDown	March 29, 2024	Uncasville, CT	Failed to win the Raw Tag Team Championship or the SmackDown Tag Team Championship in the Six-Pack Tag Team Ladder match on Night 1 of WrestleMania XL.
3	A-Town Down Under (Austin Theory and Grayson Waller)	SmackDown	March 29, 2024	Uncasville, CT	Won the SmackDown Tag Team Championship in the Six-Pack Tag Team Ladder match on Night 1 of WrestleMania XL.

NXT Heritage Cup

No.	Tournament Winner	Finals			Notes
No.	Tournament Winner	Event	Date	Location	Notes
1	Noam Dar	NXT UK	Aired October 7, 2021	London, England	Defeated Tyler Bate on the October 28 episode of NXT UK.
2	Butch	NXT	September 26, 2023	Orlando, FL	Lost to Noam Dar (2–1) at No Mercy.

=== Tournament brackets ===
==== Gold Rush Tournament (2005) ====
Tournament bracket

First Round; Raw; May 2, 2005
Kane	Pinfall
Christian	4:22
Chris Benoit	Submission
Triple H	13:34
Edge	Pinfall
Chris Jericho	8:10
Shawn Michaels	Pinfall
Shelton Benjamin	14:50

Semifinals; Raw; May 9, 2005
Kane	Pinfall
Chris Benoit	9:18
Edge	Pinfall
Shawn Michaels	9:52

Final; Raw; May 16, 2005
Kane	12:23
Edge	Pinfall

==== SmackDown World Cup ====
Tournament bracket

1st Round; SmackDown; November 11–18, 2022
(Mexico) Santos Escobar	Pinfall
(Japan) Shinsuke Nakamura	8:20
(Canada) Sami Zayn	7:30
(England) Butch	Pinfall
(United States) Braun Strowman	Pinfall
(India) Jinder Mahal	1:50
(United States) Ricochet	Pinfall
(Pakistan) Mustafa Ali	10:45

Semifinals; SmackDown; November 25, 2022
(Mexico) Santos Escobar	Pinfall
(England) Butch	9:55
(United States) Braun Strowman	3:45
(United States) Ricochet	Pinfall

Final; SmackDown; December 12, 2022
(Mexico) Santos Escobar	21:34
(United States) Ricochet	Pinfall

==== WWE SmackDown Tag Team Championship No. 1 Contender's Tournament (2023) ====
Tournament bracket

1st Round; SmackDown; January 20, 2023
Drew McIntyre and Sheamus	Pinfall
The Viking Raiders (Erik and Ivar)	17:48
Los Lotharios (Angel and Humberto)	2:52
Hit Row (Ashante "Thee" Adonis and Top Dolla)	Pinfall
The Brawling Brutes (Ridge Holland and Butch)	9:17
Imperium (Giovanni Vinci and Ludwig Kaiser)	Pinfall
Maximum Male Models (Mace and Mansoor)	2:45
Legado Del Fantasma (Cruz Del Toro and Joaquin Wilde)	Pinfall

Semifinals; SmackDown; January 27, 2023
Braun Strowman and Ricochet (Note: The Viking Raiders attacked Drew McIntyre and Sheamus. Braun Strowman and Ricochet replaced McIntyre and Sheamus.)	Pinfall
Hit Row (Ashante "Thee" Adonis and Top Dolla)	5:55
Imperium (Giovanni Vinci and Ludwig Kaiser)	Pinfall
Legado Del Fantasma (Cruz Del Toro and Joaquin Wilde)	12:15

Final; SmackDown; February 3, 2023
Braun Strowman and Ricochet	Pinfall
Imperium (Giovanni Vinci and Ludwig Kaiser)	16:16

==== United States Championship Invitational (2023) ====
Tournament bracket

1st Round; SmackDown; July 14–21, 2023
AJ Styles Butch Grayson Waller	— — 10:41
Santos Escobar	Pinfall
Rey Mysterio	Pinfall
Cameron Grimes Sheamus LA Knight	20:22 — —

Final; SmackDown; July 28, 2025
Santos Escobar	Forfeit
Rey Mysterio	12:00

==== WWE Tag Team Championship No. 1 Contender's Tournament (August 2024) ====
Tournament bracket

1st Round; SmackDown; August 9, 2024
Street Profits (Angelo Dawkins and Montez Ford)	Pinfall
A-Town Down Under (Austin Theory and Grayson Waller)	8:05
#DIY (Tommaso Ciampa and Johnny Gargano)	Pinfall
Pretty Deadly (Kit Wilson and Elton Prince)	7:10

Final; SmackDown; August 16, 2024
Street Profits	Pinfall
#DIY	15:28

==== WWE Intercontinental Championship No. 1 Contender's Tournament (2024) ====
Tournament bracket

1st Round; Raw; August 26, 2024 – September 2, 2024
The Miz	11:00
Xavier Woods	—
Pete Dunne	Pinfall
Kofi Kingston	—
Karrion Kross	8:45
Jey Uso	Pinfall
Sheamus	–
Braun Strowman	Pinfall
Ludwig Kaiser	7:40
Ilja Dragunov	Pinfall
Dragon Lee	10:31
Dominik Mysterio	—

Final; Raw; September 9, 2024
Pete Dunne	19:40
Jey Uso	Pinfall
Braun Strowman	—
Ilja Dragunov	—

==== World Tag Team Championship No. 1 Contender's Tournament (2024) ====
Tournament bracket

1st Round; Raw; October 14–21, 2024
War Raiders (Erik and Ivar)	Pinfall
Alpha Academy (Otis and Akira Tozawa)	2:25
Latino World Order (Rey Mysterio and Dragon Lee)	Pinfall
The Creed Brothers (Brutus Creed and Julius Creed)	11:00
The Authors of Pain (Akam and Rezar)	8:30
The New Day (Kofi Kingston and Xavier Woods)	Pinfall

Final; Raw; October 28, 2024
War Raiders	Pinfall
Latino World Order	—
The New Day	17:50

==== WWE Tag Team Championship No. 1 Contender's Tournament (October 2024) ====
Tournament bracket

Qualifiers; SmackDown; October 18, 2024
The Street Profits (Angelo Dawkins and Montez Ford) Pretty Deadly (Elton Prince and Kit Wilson)	— 8:10
#DIY (Johnny Gargano and Tommaso Ciampa)	Pinfall
Motor City Machine Guns (Alex Shelley and Chris Sabin)	Pinfall
A-Town Down Under (Austin Theory and Grayson Waller) Legado Del Fantasma (Angel and Berto)	— 8:35

Final; SmackDown; October 25, 2024
#DIY	11:25
Motor City Machine Guns	Pinfall

==== WWE United States Championship No. 1 Contender's Tournament (2025) ====
Tournament bracket

1st Round; SmackDown; February 28, 2025
Andrade	8:25
Jacob Fatu	Pinfall
LA Knight	Pinfall
Santos Escobar	11:59
Braun Strowman	1:30
Carmelo Hayes	Disqualification

Final; SmackDown; February 28, 2025
Jacob Fatu	–
LA Knight	Pinfall
Carmelo Hayes	12:25

== Standalone tournaments ==
=== The Wrestling Classic ===
The Wrestling Classic, also known as Wrestlevision, was a pay-per-view event that took place on November 7, 1985, from the Rosemont Horizon in Rosemont, Illinois. It revolved around a 16-man single-elimination tournament, and also featured a WWF Championship match. Junkyard Dog won the tournament after defeating Randy "Macho Man" Savage.

=== Frank Tunney Sr. Memorial Tag Team Tournament ===
The Frank Tunney Sr. Memorial Tag Team Tournament was held at Maple Leaf Gardens in Toronto, Ontario, Canada on March 15, 1987.

Tournament bracket

Quarterfinals; Frank Tunney Sr. Memorial Tag Team Tournament; March 15, 1987
The Killer Bees (B. Brian Blair and Jim Brunzell)	Pinfall
Kamala and Sika	07:32
King Kong Bundy and Paul Orndorff	Pinfall
Bob Orton and The Magnificent Muraco	06:20
The Can-Am Connection (Rick Martel and Tom Zenk)	Pinfall
Danny Spivey and Jerry Allen	10:31
Demolition (Ax and Smash)	Disqualification
The British Bulldogs (Davey Boy Smith and The Dynamite Kid)	04:50

Semifinals; Frank Tunney Sr. Memorial Tag Team Tournament; March 15, 1987
The Killer Bees	Pinfall
King Kong Bundy and Paul Orndorff	04:22
The Can-Am Connection	09:21
Demolition	Countout

Final; Frank Tunney Sr. Memorial Tag Team Tournament; March 15, 1987
The Killer Bees	Pinfall
Demolition	06:16

=== Kuwait International Tournament (1996) ===
The Kuwait International Tournament was held throughout a five-day house show tour from May 8 to May 12, 1996, in Kuwait.

Tournament bracket

1st Round; Kuwait International Tournament; May 8–9, 1996
Bret Hart	Pinfall
Leif Cassidy	10:44
Yokozuna	5:31
Owen Hart	Countout
Marty Jannetty	13:18
Stone Cold Steve Austin	Submission
Ahmed Johnson	Pinfall
Aldo Montoya	3:31
The Undertaker	Pinfall
Isaac Yankem, D.D.S.	—
Duke Droese	—
The British Bulldog	Pinfall
Savio Vega	Pinfall
Bob Backlund	—
Butch	11:56
Hunter Hearst Helmsley	Pinfall

Quarterfinals; Kuwait International Tournament; May 10, 1996
Bret Hart	11:31
Owen Hart	Pinfall
Stone Cold Steve Austin	9:20
Ahmed Johnson	Pinfall
The Undertaker	Pinfall
British Bulldog	3:40
Savio Vega	—
Hunter Hearst Helmsley	Pinfall

Semifinals; Kuwait International Tournament; May 11, 1996
Owen Hart	—
Ahmed Johnson	Pinfall
The Undertaker	9:11
Hunter Hearst Helmsley	Disqualification

Final; Kuwait International Tournament; May 12, 1996
Ahmed Johnson	Pinfall
Hunter Hearst Helmsley	—

=== Middle East Cup ===
The Middle East Cup took place in Dubai on December 2, 1996.

Tournament bracket

Quarterfinals; Middle East Cup; December 2, 1996
Bret Hart	Pinfall
The British Bulldog	—
Vader	Countout
Faarooq	Countout
Owen Hart	—
Stone Cold Steve Austin	Win
The Undertaker	Win
Mankind	—

Semifinals; Middle East Cup; December 2, 1996
Bret Hart	Bye
N/A	—
Stone Cold Steve Austin	Win
The Undertaker	—

Final; Middle East Cup; December 2, 1996
Bret Hart	Pinfall
Stone Cold Steve Austin	—

=== Kuwait International Tournament (1997) ===
The Kuwait International Tournament was held throughout a 1997 house show tour in Kuwait. During the tour, Vader and The Undertaker appeared on Good Morning Kuwait where Vader attacked the host of the show when he asked about the legitimacy of professional wrestling; Vader was fined $164 by Kuwaiti authorities for the incident as well as being held in custody for several days.

Tournament bracket

1st Round; Kuwait International Tournament; April 10, 1997
Tiger Ali Singh	Pinfall
Leif Cassidy	—
Billy Gunn	Pinfall
Bob Holly	—
Diesel	—
Davey Boy Smith	Pinfall
Phineas I. Godwinn	—
Mankind	Submission
Vader	Pinfall
Bart Gunn	—
Sycho Sid	—
Freddie Joe Floyd	Forfeit
Stone Cold Steve Austin	Countout
Bret Hart	—
Henry O. Godwinn	—
Owen Hart	Submission

Quarterfinals; Kuwait International Tournament; April 11, 1997
Tiger Ali Singh	Pinfall
Billy Gunn	—
Davey Boy Smith	—
Mankind	Win
Vader	Pinfall
Freddie Joe Floyd	—
Stone Cold Steve Austin	—
Owen Hart	Pinfall

Semifinals; Kuwait International Tournament; April 12, 1997
Tiger Ali Singh	Pinfall
Mankind	—
Vader	—
Owen Hart	Forfeit

Final; Kuwait International Tournament; April 13, 1997
Tiger Ali Singh	Pinfall
Owen Hart	—

=== Brawl for All ===
The WWF Brawl for All was a shoot fighting tournament that occurred from June 29 to August 24, 1998.

=== Royal Rumble Entry Tournament ===
The Royal Rumble Entry Tournament was a tournament on NXT where the winner entered the 2013 Royal Rumble Match. Bo Dallas won the tournament.

=== Andre the Giant Memorial Battle Royal qualifying tournament ===
The Andre the Giant Memorial Battle Royal Qualifying Tournament was a tournament at WrestleMania Axxess for a spot in the André the Giant Memorial Battle Royal.

=== WWE World Cup ===
The WWE World Cup took place on November 2, 2018, at Crown Jewel in Saudi Arabia. Four participants came from Raw and four participants came from SmackDown. In the final, Shane McMahon defeated Dolph Ziggler to be crowned "Best In The World". At the 2019 Crown Jewel, another World Cup was held, however; it did not take place in the form of a tournament.

=== The Last Time Is Now Tournament ===
The Last Time Is Now Tournament was a 16-man tournament held to determine John Cena's opponent in Cena's retirement match at Saturday Night's Main Event on December 13, 2025. The tournament began on the November 10 episode of Raw in Cena's hometown of Boston, Massachusetts, and featured wrestlers from WWE's Raw, SmackDown, and NXT brands. Gunther won the tournament by defeating LA Knight in the tournament final on the December 5, 2025, episode of SmackDown.

== King of the Ring ==
King of the Ring is a professional wrestling single-elimination tournament held by WWE. It was held annually from 1985 to 2002 (excluding 1990 and 1992) and from 1993 to 2002 the tournament was produced as a pay-per-view event. Tournaments have since been held periodically - in 2006, 2008, 2010, 2015, 2019, 2021, and 2024

=== Dates and venues of finals ===
In 2002, in addition to being crowned "King of the Ring", the winner also earned a match for the WWE Undisputed Championship at SummerSlam. A world championship match at SummerSlam would become an additional permanent prize beginning in 2024, with the winners of the 2024 and 2025 tournaments specifically earning a match for the world championship of their respective brand at the event, while beginning in 2026, the winners have a choice of which world title to challenge for at SummerSlam.

†	Winner from Raw brand	‡	Winner from SmackDown brand

#	Year	Winner	Tournament final			Runner-up
#	Year	Winner	Event	Date	Location	Runner-up
1	1985	Don Muraco	House show	July 8, 1985	Foxborough, MA	The Iron Sheik
2	1986	Harley Race	House show	July 14, 1986	Foxborough, MA	Pedro Morales
3	1987	Randy Savage	House show	September 4, 1987	Providence, RI	King Kong Bundy
4	1988	Ted DiBiase	House show	October 16, 1988	Providence, RI	Randy Savage
5	1989	Tito Santana	House show	October 14, 1989	Providence, RI	Rick Martel
6	1991	Bret Hart	House show	September 7, 1991	Providence, RI	Irwin R. Schyster
7	1993	Bret Hart	King of the Ring	June 13, 1993	Dayton, OH	Bam Bam Bigelow
8	1994	Owen Hart	King of the Ring	June 19, 1994	Baltimore, MD	Razor Ramon
9	1995	Mabel	King of the Ring	June 25, 1995	Philadelphia, PA	Savio Vega
10	1996	"Stone Cold" Steve Austin	King of the Ring	June 23, 1996	Milwaukee, WI	Jake Roberts
11	1997	Hunter Hearst Helmsley	King of the Ring	June 8, 1997	Providence, RI	Mankind
12	1998	Ken Shamrock	King of the Ring	June 28, 1998	Pittsburgh, PA	The Rock
13	1999	Billy Gunn	King of the Ring	June 27, 1999	Greensboro, NC	X-Pac
14	2000	Kurt Angle	King of the Ring	June 25, 2000	Boston, MA	Rikishi
15	2001	Edge	King of the Ring	June 24, 2001	East Rutherford, NJ	Kurt Angle
16	2002	Brock Lesnar	King of the Ring	June 23, 2002	Columbus, OH	Rob Van Dam
17	2006 (Note: The King of the Ring Tournament in 2006 was exclusive to the SmackDown brand.)	Booker T	Judgment Day	May 21, 2006	Phoenix, AZ	Bobby Lashley
18	2008	William Regal	Raw	April 21, 2008	Greenville, SC	CM Punk
19	2010	Sheamus	Raw	November 29, 2010	Philadelphia, PA	John Morrison
20	2015	Bad News Barrett	King of the Ring	April 28, 2015	Moline, IL	Neville
21	2019	Baron Corbin	Raw	September 16, 2019	Knoxville, TN	Chad Gable
22	2021	Xavier Woods	Crown Jewel	October 21, 2021	Riyadh, Saudi Arabia	Finn Bálor
23	2024	Gunther	King and Queen of the Ring	May 25, 2024	Jeddah, Saudi Arabia	Randy Orton
24	2025	Cody Rhodes	Night of Champions	June 28, 2025	Riyadh, Saudi Arabia	Randy Orton
25	2026	Oba Femi	Night of Champions	June 27, 2026	Riyadh, Saudi Arabia	Jey Uso

=== Winner's championship opportunity ===
Victory
Loss
Did not receive title match

#	Winner	Brand	Event	Date	Championship	Result
1	Brock Lesnar	Raw	SummerSlam	August 25, 2002	WWE Undisputed Championship	Defeated The Rock.
2	Gunther	Raw	SummerSlam	August 3, 2024	World Heavyweight Championship	Defeated Damian Priest.
3	Cody Rhodes	SmackDown	SummerSlam; Night 2	August 3, 2025	Undisputed WWE Championship	Defeated John Cena in a Street Fight.
4	Oba Femi	Raw	SummerSlam; Night 1	August 1, 2026	N/A	Femi relinquished his title opportunity to instead face Brock Lesnar in a Hell in a Cell match at SummerSlam.

== Queen of the Ring ==
In 2021, WWE debuted the Queen's Crown tournament for female wrestlers considered to be the counterpart to King of the Ring. Zelina Vega was the inaugural winner, defeating Doudrop at Crown Jewel 2021, which took place on October 21 at Mohammed Abdu Arena on the Boulevard in Riyadh, Saudi Arabia. In 2024, the second edition of the tournament was held, this time under the name Queen of the Ring.

=== Dates and venues of finals ===
A women's world championship match at SummerSlam would become an additional permanent prize beginning in 2024, with the winners of the 2024 and 2025 tournaments specifically earning a match for the world championship of their respective brand at the event, while beginning in 2026, the winners have a choice of which world title to challenge for at SummerSlam.

†	Winner from Raw brand	‡	Winner from SmackDown brand

#	Year	Winner	Tournament final			Runner-up	Ref
#	Year	Winner	Event	Date	Location	Runner-up	Ref
1	2021	Zelina Vega	Crown Jewel	October 21, 2021	Riyadh, Saudi Arabia	Doudrop	
2	2024	Nia Jax	King and Queen of the Ring	May 25, 2024	Jeddah, Saudi Arabia	Lyra Valkyria	
3	2025	Jade Cargill	Night of Champions	June 28, 2025	Riyadh, Saudi Arabia	Asuka	
3	2026	Iyo Sky	Night of Champions	June 27, 2026	Riyadh, Saudi Arabia	Liv Morgan	

=== Queen of the Ring winner's championship opportunity ===
– Victory
– Loss

#	Winner	Brand	Event	Date	Championship	Result
1	Nia Jax	SmackDown	SummerSlam	August 3, 2024	WWE Women's Championship	Defeated Bayley.
2	Jade Cargill	SmackDown	SummerSlam; Night 1	August 2, 2025	WWE Women's Championship	Lost to Tiffany Stratton.
3	Iyo Sky	Raw	SummerSlam; Night 1	August 1, 2026	Women's World Championship	Lost to Liv Morgan.

== Dusty Rhodes Tag Team Classic ==
The Dusty Rhodes Tag Team Classic is a tag team tournament, honoring WWE Hall of Famer Dusty Rhodes, who died in 2015. Originally exclusive to men’s teams from 2015 to 2020, the tournament expanded to include a female division in 2021 and 2022, before reverting to a men’s-only competition in 2024.

Tournament summary
No.	Winners	Finals			
No.	Winners	Event	Date	Venue	City
1	Finn Bálor and Samoa Joe	NXT TakeOver: Respect	October 7, 2015	Full Sail University	Winter Park, FL
2	The Authors of Pain (Note: The manager of the Authors of Pain Paul Ellering was suspended in a shark cage above the ring during the tournament final.) (Akam and Rezar)	NXT TakeOver: Toronto	November 19, 2016	Air Canada Centre	Toronto, Ontario, Canada
3	The Undisputed Era (Note: Although The Undisputed Era were not official participants in the tournament, they were added to the final after causing a double disqualification in the original final. The Undisputed Era defended the NXT Tag Team Championship in the final.) (Adam Cole and Kyle O'Reilly)	NXT TakeOver: New Orleans	April 7, 2018	Smoothie King Center	New Orleans, LA
4	Aleister Black and Ricochet	NXT	March 13, 2019	Full Sail University	Winter Park, FL
5	The Broserweights (Matt Riddle and Pete Dunne)	NXT	January 29, 2020	Full Sail University	Winter Park, FL
6	MSK (Nash Carter and Wes Lee)	NXT TakeOver: Vengeance Day	February 14, 2021	WWE Performance Center	Orlando, FL
7	Dakota Kai and Raquel González	NXT TakeOver: Vengeance Day	February 14, 2021	WWE Performance Center	Orlando, FL
8	The Creed Brothers (Brutus Creed and Julius Creed)	Vengeance Day	February 15, 2022	WWE Performance Center	Orlando, FL
9	Kay Lee Ray and Io Shirai	NXT	March 22, 2022	WWE Performance Center	Orlando, FL
10	Baron Corbin and Bron Breakker	Vengeance Day	February 4, 2024	F&M Bank Arena	Clarksville, TN
11	Noam Dar and Romeo Moreno	NXT	November 4, 2026	WWE Performance Center	Orlando, FL

=== Championship opportunity ===
==== Men's ====
Starting with the 2019 edition, every tournament winner has earned a future NXT Tag Team Championship match.

– Victory
– Loss

No.	Winners	Event	Date	Result
1	Aleister Black and Ricochet	NXT TakeOver: New York	April 5, 2019	Lost to The War Raiders (Hanson and Ivar).
2	The Broserweights (Matt Riddle and Pete Dunne)	NXT TakeOver: Portland	February 16, 2020	Defeated The Undisputed Era (Bobby Fish and Kyle O'Reilly).
3	MSK (Nash Carter and Wes Lee)	NXT TakeOver: Stand & Deliver; Night 1	April 7, 2021	Defeated the Grizzled Young Veterans (James Drake and Zack Gibson) and Legado del Fantasma (Joaquin Wilde and Raul Mendoza) in a triple threat tag team match for the vacant NXT Tag Team Championship.
4	The Creed Brothers (Brutus Creed and Julius Creed)	Stand & Deliver	April 2, 2022	Lost to new champions MSK (Nash Carter and Wes Lee) in a triple threat tag team match that also involved defending champions Imperium (Fabian Aichner and Marcel Barthel).
5	Baron Corbin and Bron Breakker	NXT	February 13, 2024	Defeated The Family (Channing "Stacks" Lorenzo and Tony D'Angelo).
6	Noam Dar and Romeo Moreno	TBA	TBA	Dar and Moreno were supposed to challenge The Vanity Project (Brad Baylor and Ricky Smokes) on the November 10, 2026, episode of NXT but were attacked backstage by the Vanity Project and ruled out of the match. Tournament runners-up Hank & Tank (Hank Walker and Tank Ledger) received the title match instead. It is currently not known whether Dar and Moreno will receive a future title match.

==== Women's ====
Every tournament winner has earned a future title match either for the WWE Women's Tag Team Championship or NXT Women's Tag Team Championship.

– Victory
– Loss

No.	Winners	Championship match			
No.	Winners	Championship	Event	Date	Result
1	Dakota Kai and Raquel González	WWE Women's Tag Team Championship	NXT	March 3, 2021	Lost to Nia Jax and Shayna Baszler. Kai controversially submitted to Baszler after a new referee was sent in by WWE official Adam Pearce despite Kai not being the legal competitor. The following week, NXT General Manager William Regal awarded the NXT Women's Tag Team Championship to Kai and González.
2	Kay Lee Ray and Io Shirai	NXT Women's Championship	Stand & Deliver	April 2, 2022	Both lost to defending champion Mandy Rose in a fatal four-way match that also involved Cora Jade.

== Mae Young Classic ==
The Mae Young Classic was an all-women's tournament produced by WWE. The event was named of WWE Hall of Famer Mae Young.

=== Summary ===
Year	Winner	Runner-up	Date	City	Venue	Source
2017	Kairi Sane	Shayna Baszler	July 13, 2017	Winter Park, Florida	Full Sail University	
2017	Kairi Sane	Shayna Baszler	July 14, 2017	Winter Park, Florida	Full Sail University	
2017	Kairi Sane	Shayna Baszler	September 27, 2017	Paradise, Nevada	Thomas & Mack Center	
2018	Toni Storm	Io Shirai	August 8, 2018	Winter Park, Florida	Full Sail University	
2018	Toni Storm	Io Shirai	August 9, 2018	Winter Park, Florida	Full Sail University	
2018	Toni Storm	Io Shirai	October 28, 2018	Uniondale, New York	Nassau Veterans Memorial Coliseum	

== Mixed Match Challenge ==
The Mixed Match Challenge is a seasonal mixed tag team tournament produced by WWE that was streamed on Facebook Watch.

=== Summary ===
Season	Winner	Runner-up	Finals date
1	The Miz and Asuka	Bobby Roode and Charlotte Flair	April 3, 2018
2	R-Truth and Carmella	Jinder Mahal and Alicia Fox	December 16, 2018

== NXT Breakout Tournament ==
The NXT Breakout Tournament is a tournament featured on the NXT brand, consisting of eight wrestlers who are new to NXT (usually WWE Performance Center recruits making their NXT television debuts). The winner of the tournament receives a championship match of their choice which they can cash in anytime. Originally introduced in 2019 for male wrestlers, a female version was created in 2022.

=== Summary ===
Year	Winner	Finals			
Year	Winner	Event	Date	Venue	City
2019	Jordan Myles	NXT	August 10, 2019	Scotiabank Arena	Toronto, Ontario, Canada
2021	Carmelo Hayes	NXT	August 23, 2021	WWE Performance Center	Orlando, Florida
2022	Roxanne Perez	NXT	June 7, 2022	WWE Performance Center	Orlando, Florida
2023	Lola Vice	Halloween Havoc	October 31, 2023	WWE Performance Center	Orlando, Florida
2024	Oba Femi	New Year's Evil	January 2, 2024	WWE Performance Center	Orlando, Florida

=== NXT Breakout Tournament winner's championship opportunity ===
Color key

Won championship match
Lost championship match

==== Male ====
No.	Winner	Event	Date	Championship match
1	Jordan Myles	NXT	August 15, 2019	Myles lost to Adam Cole for the NXT Championship.
2	Carmelo Hayes	NXT	October 12, 2021	Hayes cashed in after Isaiah "Swerve" Scott retained the NXT North American Championship against Santos Escobar.
3	Oba Femi	NXT	January 9, 2024	Femi cashed in after Dragon Lee retained the NXT North American Championship against Lexis King.

==== Female ====
No.	Winner	Event	Date	Championship match
1	Roxanne Perez	NXT	July 12, 2022	Perez lost to Mandy Rose for the NXT Women's Championship.
2	Lola Vice	Vengeance Day	February 4, 2024	Vice cashed in during a singles match between the defending champion Lyra Valkyria and Roxanne Perez for the NXT Women's Championship, thus converting it into a triple threat match.

== WWE Speed ==
WWE Speed is a streaming television program produced by WWE that aired on X from April 2024 to July 2025. It followws a bracket-style format that featured wrestlers from the Raw, SmackDown, NXT, and eventually Evolve brands, with matches contested under a three-minute time limit. However, matches contested for the WWE Speed Championship or WWE Women's Speed Championship were held under a five-minute time limit. Following the cancellation of Speed, the championships were moved to the NXT brand, with the first tournament broadcast on WWE NXT, additionally featuring wrestlers from Total Nonstop Action Wrestling and Lucha Libre AAA Worldwide. All matches took place on Speed until July 9, 2025; matches then took place on NXT and NXT Premium Live Events. The number one contenders were determined in tournaments.

Legend
Won title by defeating the reigning champion
Won vacant title
Failed to win title

=== WWE Speed Championship tournaments ===
Won title by defeating the reigning champion
Won vacant title
Failed to win title

No.	Tournament winner	No.	Championship match			
No.	Tournament winner	No.	Opponent	Event	Filming date	Broadcast date
1	Ricochet	1	Johnny Gargano	Speed	April 26, 2024	May 3, 2024
2	Tyler Bate	1	Ricochet (c)	Speed	May 20, 2024	May 24, 2024
3	Andrade	1	Ricochet (c)	Speed	June 7, 2024	June 14, 2024
4	Xavier Woods	1	Andrade (c)	Speed	June 28, 2024	July 5, 2024
5	Baron Corbin	1	Andrade (c)	Speed	July 19, 2024	July 24, 2024
6	Pete Dunne	1	Andrade (c)	Speed	August 23, 2024	August 30, 2024
7	Dragon Lee	1	Andrade (c)	Speed	November 15, 2024	November 20, 2024
8	Chad Gable	1	Dragon Lee (c)	Speed	January 31, 2025	February 1, 2025
9	Ivar	1	Dragon Lee (c)	Speed	March 7, 2025	March 19, 2025
10	El Grande Americano (Note: El Grande Americano was portrayed by Chad Gable at the time, who previously won the tournament as himself.)	2	Dragon Lee (c)	Speed	May 5, 2025	May 7, 2025
11	Berto	1	El Grande Americano (c)	Speed	June 17, 2025	June 18, 2025
12	Jasper Troy	1	El Grande Americano (c) (Note: El Grande Americano was portrayed by Ludwig Kaiser, who replaced Chad Gable in the role on June 30 due to injury.)	NXT	November 11, 2025	
13	Tavion Heights	1	Jasper Troy (c)	NXT	January 13, 2026	
14	Elio Lefleur (Note: The tournament final between Elio Lefleur and Eli Knight ended in a time limit draw, making them the co-winners. Interim NXT General Manager Robert Stone announced a triple threat match among defending champion Jasper Troy and the co-winners of the tournament for the WWE Speed Championship.)	1	Jasper Troy (c)	NXT	February 24, 2026	
14	Eli Knight	1	Jasper Troy (c)	NXT	February 24, 2026	
15	Lexis King	1	EK Prosper	NXT: Revenge; Week 2	April 21, 2026	
16	Romeo Moreno	1	Lexis King (c)	NXT	June 2, 2026	
(c) – denotes the defending champion

=== WWE Women's Speed Championship tournaments ===
Won title by defeating the reigning champion
Won vacant title
Failed to win title

No.	Tournament winner	No.	Championship match			
No.	Tournament winner	No.	Opponent	Event	Filming date	Broadcast date
1	Candice LeRae	1	Iyo Sky	Speed	October 4, 2024	October 9, 2024
2	Natalya	1	Candice LeRae (c)	Speed	January 3, 2025	January 8, 2025
3	Zoey Stark	1	Candice LeRae (c)	Speed	February 21, 2025	February 26, 2025
4	Sol Ruca	1	Candice LeRae (c)	Speed	April 11, 2025	April 16, 2025
5	Ivy Nile	1	Sol Ruca (c)	Speed	May 23, 2025	May 28, 2025
6	Alba Fyre	1	Sol Ruca (c)	Speed	July 8, 2025	July 9, 2025
7	Jaida Parker (Note: Jaida Parker replaced Lainey Reid, the original tournament winner, who suffered an injury during training and did not win the tournament herself.)	—	Sol Ruca (c)	No Mercy	September 27, 2025	
8	Fallon Henley	1	Zaria	Gold Rush	November 18, 2025	November 25, 2025
9	Wren Sinclair	1	Fallon Henley (c)	NXT	March 17, 2026	
10	Arianna Grace	1	Wren Sinclair (c)	The Great American Bash	June 28, 2026	
(c) – denotes the defending champion

== See also ==
- List of WWE pay-per-view and livestreaming supercards
- List of Lucha Libre AAA Worldwide tournaments
