= Superfly =

Superfly or Super fly may refer to:

== Film and music ==
- Super Fly (1972 film), a blaxploitation film
  - Super Fly (soundtrack), a 1972 Curtis Mayfield soundtrack to the film
  - "Superfly" (song), the album's title track
- Superfly (2018 film), a remake of the 1972 blaxploitation film
  - Superfly (soundtrack), a soundtrack album from the 2018 film
- Armour of God II: Operation Condor, a 1991 Hong Kong film released in the Philippines as Superfly
- "Super Fly" (Giant Panda song), a 2005 single by Giant Panda
- "Superfly", a song by 4 Non Blondes on their only album Bigger, Better, Faster, More!
- "Superfly", a song on The O.C. Supertones' sixth album Hi-Fi Revival
- "Superfly 2018", a Hardbass song by DJ Blyatman
- Superfly (band) (born 1984), Japanese rock unit, formerly a duo
  - Superfly (Superfly album), the rock unit's debut self-titled album

== Wrestling ==
- "Superfly" Jimmy Snuka (1943–2017), Fijian professional wrestler
- Super Fly (wrestler) (born 1987), Mexican professional wrestler
- The Superflies, an English professional wrestling tag team consisting of Ricky Knight and Jimmy Ocean

== People ==
- "Superfly" Frank Lucas (1930–2019), Harlem crime figure and inspiration for the film American Gangster

== Other uses ==
- Superfly (company), a marketing company in the United States
- Super flyweight, a weight division in professional boxing
- Superfly (boxing), a 2017–2018 series of super flyweight boxing cards
- MX Superfly, a motocross racing game released in 2002
- Superfly, a recurring character in the Joe Cartoon franchise
- Superfly Johnson, a character from the failed video game Daikatana
- Superfly, the primary antagonist in the movie Teenage Mutant Ninja Turtles: Mutant Mayhem
- Super Fly: The Unexpected Lives of the World's Most Successful Insects, a book about flies by Jonathan Balcombe
