= Paul Orndorff =

American professional wrestler (1949–2021)

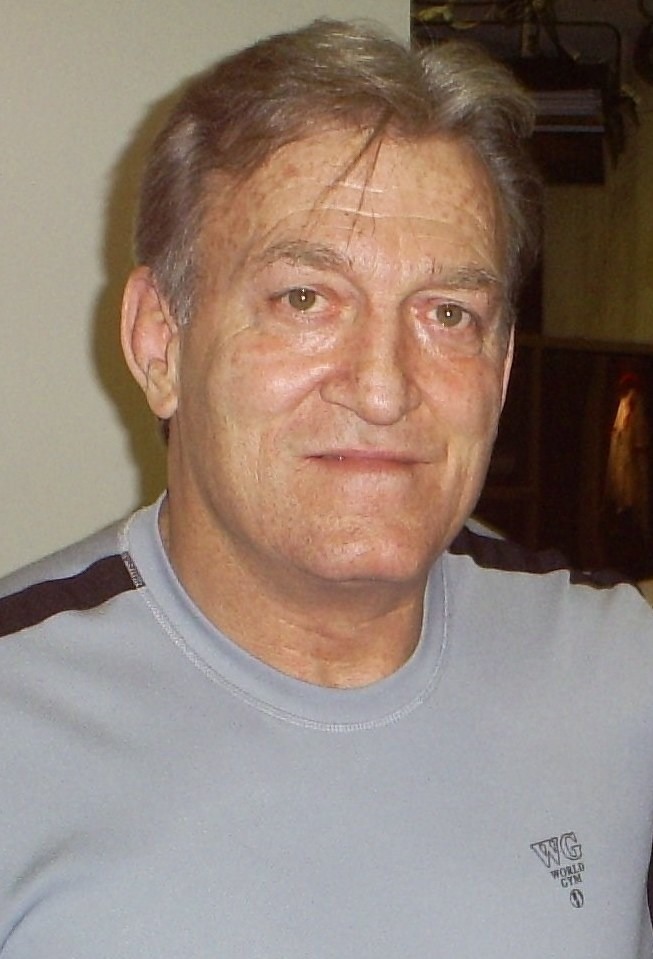
- Orndorff in 2009
- Born: Paul Parlette Orndorff Jr. October 29, 1949; Winchester, Virginia, U.S.
- Died: July 12, 2021 (aged 71); Atlanta, Georgia, U.S.
- Education: University of Tampa
- Spouse: Ronda Maxwell (m. 1971)
- Children: 2
- Family: Terry Orndorff (brother)
- Professional wrestling career
- Ring name: "Mr. Wonderful" Paul Orndorff
- Billed height: 6 ft 0 in (183 cm)
- Billed weight: 252 lb (114 kg)
- Billed from: Brandon, Florida, U.S.
- Trained by: Bob Backlund; Jack Brisco; Eddie Graham; Hiro Matsuda
- Debut: 1976
- Retired: 2000
- Football career

Profile
- Positions: Tight end, fullback

Career information
- High school: Brandon High (FL)
- College: Tampa
- NFL draft: 1973: 12th round, 289th overall pick

Career history
- New Orleans Saints (1973)*; Chicago Bears (1974)*; Jacksonville Express (1975)*
- * Offseason or practice squad member only

Awards and highlights
- University of Tampa Athletic Hall of Fame (1986)

Paul Parlette Orndorff Jr. (October 29, 1949 – July 12, 2021), nicknamed "Mr. Wonderful", was an American professional wrestler and football player, best known for his appearances with the World Wrestling Federation (WWF) and World Championship Wrestling (WCW).

After seven years working around the National Wrestling Alliance (NWA), Orndorff became a star in the 1980s WWF wrestling boom eventually appearing in the main events of both the initial WrestleMania and also the debut of Survivor Series. He left the WWF for WCW in early 1990, where he won the WCW World Television Championship and the WCW World Tag Team Championship with Paul Roma (as a team called Pretty Wonderful).

Arm atrophy from a nagging injury led him to retire in 2000. After retiring, he trained aspiring wrestlers. Orndorff was inducted into the WWE Hall of Fame in 2005 and the National Wrestling Alliance Hall of Fame in 2009.

== Football career ==
Orndorff played college football at the University of Tampa, where he was a fullback for his first three seasons before he was moved to tight end mid-season in his senior year by coach Earle Bruce. He scored 21 career touchdowns and gained over 2,000 all-purpose yards in his playing career with the Spartans. He was inducted into the University of Tampa Athletic Hall of Fame in 1986.

Orndorff was selected in the 12th round of the 1973 NFL draft by the New Orleans Saints, who drafted him as a fullback, while leaving open the possibility of playing him at tight end. He voluntarily quit during training camp, citing "personal problems". He was considering giving professional wrestling a try, like his former Tampa teammate Ron Mikolajczyk, who made his wrestling debut that summer. After attending training camp with the Chicago Bears in 1974, Orndorff joined the Jacksonville Express of the World Football League in 1975, but he was injured.

== Professional wrestling career ==
=== Early career (1976–1980) ===
After his football career ended, Orndorff watched Championship Wrestling from Florida in the mid-1970s. He called his father-in-law, who knew someone who knew Florida promoter Eddie Graham, which got his start into the wrestling business.

Orndorff started wrestling in 1976 in Mid-Southern Wrestling where he feuded with a young Jerry Lawler. Orndorff won his first wrestling title when he pinned Lawler for the NWA Southern Heavyweight Championship on June 7, 1977. Orndorff lost the title back to Lawler before he left the Memphis territory. Orndorff began working for the NWA Tri-State promotion where he got involved in a feud with Ernie Ladd. The feud with Ladd saw Orndorff win the NWA Tri-State North American Heavyweight Title from Ladd on two occasions (on May 29, 1978 and again in June). Both times, Orndorff's reigns were short and were ended by Ladd.

After feuding with Ladd, Orndorff continued to make a name for himself in the National Wrestling Alliance (NWA) where he feuded with The Masked Superstar. During this time he became known as "The Brandon Bull", a nickname he had during his days as a football player. In December 1978, Orndorff teamed with Jimmy Snuka to capture the NWA World Tag Team Championship from Baron von Raschke and Greg Valentine. The duo held on to the title for five months before losing it to Raschke and his new partner Paul Jones on April 16, 1979.

In 1979, Orndorff traveled to the Alabama territory's "Southeast Championship Wrestling." There, Orndorff worked mainly as a tag team competitor teaming with Dick Slater to win the NWA Southeast Tag Team Championship from the team of Jimmy Golden and Norvell Austin in October 1979. Their reign only lasted about a month before being upended by the combination of Dennis Condrey and David Schultz. Orndorff then teamed with former opponent Austin (who was calling himself "The Junkyard Dog" at the time, not to be mistaken for the more famous Junkyard Dog) to win the title in late 1979. The duo beat Condrey and Randy Rose, the same team that ended Orndorff and Austin's run with the gold. Austin, Condrey, and Rose formed The Midnight Express shortly thereafter.

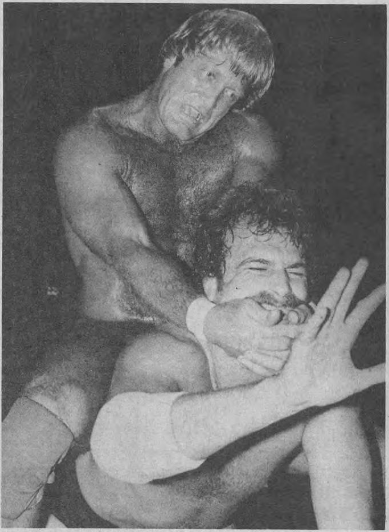
Orndorff (top) applying a chinlock to Jake Roberts during a 1981 match

During 1980, Orndorff started to split his time between the Alabama and the Mid-South territories, until he left the Alabama territory by the end of 1980 to focus entirely on the Mid-South territory.

=== New Japan Pro-Wrestling (1980) ===
Orndorff debuted in New Japan Pro-Wrestling (NJPW) in October 1980 as part of its "Toukon Series". In his first bout, in Tokyo's Korakuen Hall, he defeated Tatsumi Fujinami by count out. Over the following weeks, he faced opponents such as Kengo Kimura, Osamu Kido, and Strong Kobayashi, occasionally teaming with Hulk Hogan and other fellow gaijin wrestlers such as Chavo Guerrero. He wrestled his final match of the tour on November 6, 1980, in Tsu, Mie, teaming with Hulk Hogan in a loss to Antonio Inoki and Riki Choshu.

=== Mid South Wrestling (1980–1982) ===
In Mid-South, Orndorff feuded with Ken Mantell over Mantell's propensity for cutting people's hair after a match. Orndorff got the better of Mantell and won the right to use the Freebird hair removal cream on Mantell. Orndorff earned a shot at the North American champion The Grappler but on the day of the match he overslept (storyline) and was incensed when his replacement Jake "The Snake" Roberts beat the Grappler for the title. Orndorff's reaction to Roberts's title win signaled a change in attitude; he turned heel as he demanded a title match against Roberts. While he lost the support of the fans, he won the North American title on July 4, 1981. Orndorff feuded with Ted DiBiase, JYD, Dusty Rhodes, and Dick Murdoch while holding on to the North American title. Orndorff lost the title to DiBiase on November 1, 1981, in a match at the Municipal Auditorium in New Orleans, Louisiana. Orndorff was unable to wrestle in the rematch due to car trouble, which meant that Orndorff's friend Bob Roop got the title shot and won the match. It was soon revealed that Roop had sabotaged Orndorff's car so he could get the title shot instead (storyline). Orndorff turned face to feud with Roop but found himself unable to regain the title. He left Mid-South Wrestling in May 1982.

=== Georgia Championship Wrestling (1982–1983) ===
Orndorff reappeared in Georgia Championship Wrestling in June 1982, immediately launching into a feud with Buzz Sawyer over the NWA National Heavyweight Championship. He won the gold on June 20, 1982. During the summer, he vacated the title to focus on pursuing the NWA World Champion "Nature Boy" Ric Flair. He was unsuccessful in his challenge and soon focused on the title he gave up. When Orndorff vacated the title, it was put on the line in a tournament that was won by The Super Destroyer. On August 19, 1982, Orndorff regained the title from the Super Destroyer. Orndorff next feuded with The Masked Superstar, with whom he traded the National Heavyweight title back and forth during the fall of 1982. Orndorff then traded the title back and forth with Super Destroyer. Frustrated with his inability to beat Orndorff for the National title, Larry Zbyszko paid Killer Tim Brooks $25,000 to do his dirty work. Brooks beat Orndorff with the help of a chair and won the title only to turn around and give it to Zbyszko. The fact that Zbyszko bought the title and did not win it forced NWA President Bob Geigel to step in and strip Zbyszko of the title. Orndorff left Georgia Championship Wrestling in June 1983.

=== New Japan Pro-Wrestling (1983) ===
Orndorff returned to NJPW in April 1983 as part of its "Big Fight Series II". In his returning match on April 1, he teamed with Ed Leslie in a loss to Antonio Inoki and Tatsumi Fujinami in Tokyo's Korakuen Hall. During the tour, he primarily teamed with Leslie or with Buddy Rose. In his final match of the tour, he lost to Akira Maeda in Tokyo's Kuramae Kokugikan.

Orndorff returned to NJPW for his second tour of the year on July 22 as part of its "Summer Fight Series", teaming with Adrian Adonis and Brian Blair in a loss to Akira Maeda, Osamu Kido, and Tatsumi Fujinami in Hakodate. He wrestled his final match of the tour on August 4, defeating Ryuma Go in the Kuramae Kokugikan.

Orndorff returned to NJPW for the third time in 1983 that October as part of its "Toukon Series", making what would be his final tour with the promotion. In his first match on October 7, he and Big John Studd wrestled Akira Maeda and Seiji Sakaguchi to a double count out in Tokyo's Korakuen Hall. He wrestled his last match for NJPW in November 3, defeating Masanobu Kurisu in the Kuramae Kokugikan.

=== World Wrestling Federation (1983–1988) ===
==== Alliance with Roddy Piper (1983–1985) ====
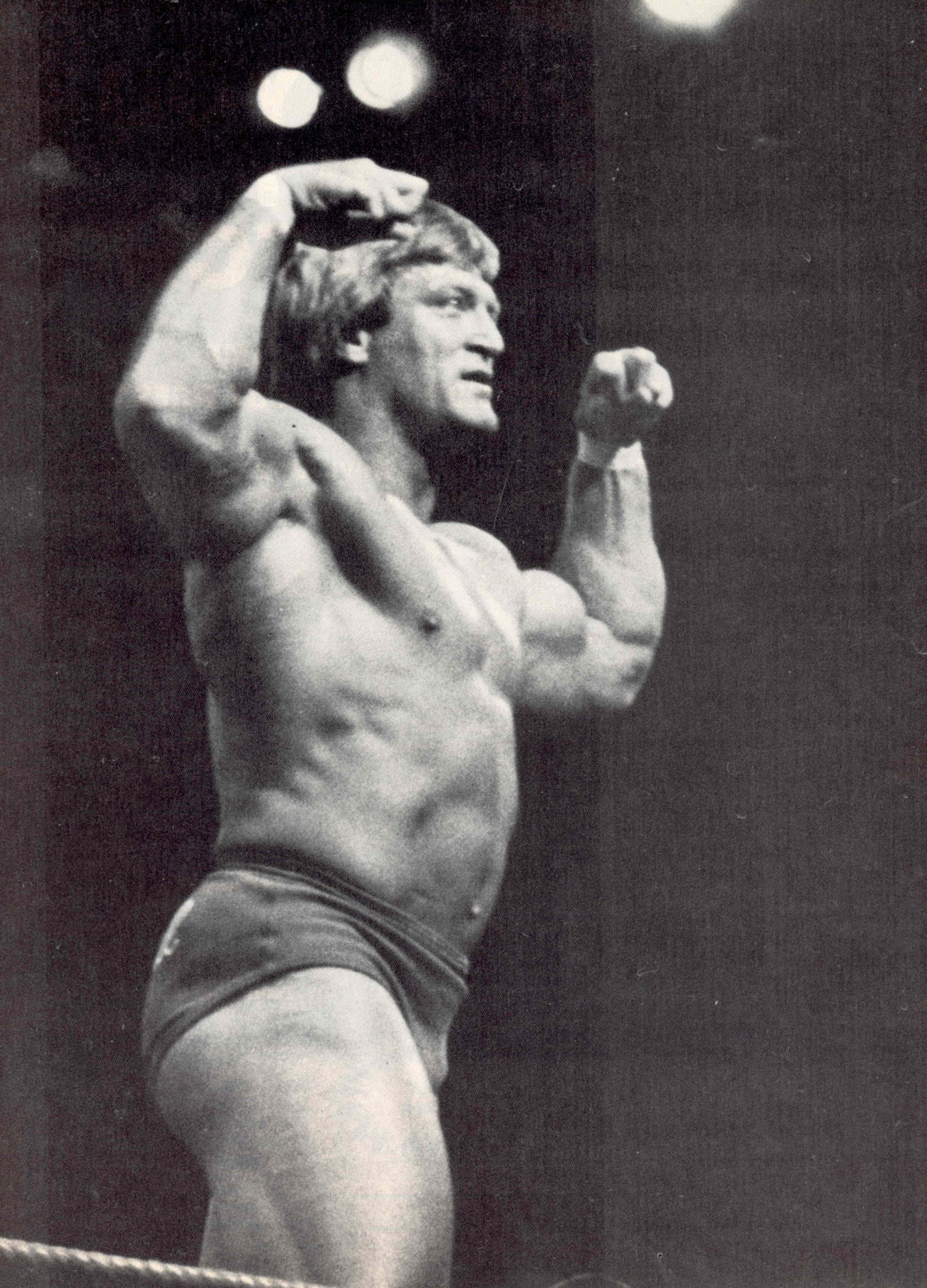
Orndorff, circa 1985

After wrestling a pair of matches for the World Wrestling Federation (WWF) in April 1983, Orndorff signed with the promotion later that year, making his return in November. Starting in January 1984, Orndorff took on "Rowdy" Roddy Piper as his manager. Piper nicknamed Orndorff "Mr. Wonderful", a nickname that he used thereafter. Orndorff faced Salvatore Bellomo on the night that Hulk Hogan defeated The Iron Sheik for the WWF World Heavyweight Championship and "Hulkamania was now in the WWF as it was in the AWA". Orndorff became one of the first people to challenge for the world title, shooting straight to the main event less than a month after his debut. Hogan disposed of the challenger and moved on while Orndorff fought a variety of opponents including the Intercontinental Champion Tito Santana. When Piper assaulted Jimmy Snuka on the set of Piper's Pit, Orndorff assisted the Rowdy One in his matches. Orndorff and Piper often faced Snuka and "The Tonga Kid" in tag team competition.

Near the end of 1984, Piper's assault on Cyndi Lauper (kayfabe) brought Orndorff and Piper on a collision course with Hogan and Mr. T. Hogan's feud with Piper also meant that Orndorff was thrust back into the main event picture; he defeated Tony Atlas at The War to Settle the Score and then played a part in the main event. The fallout from The War to Settle the Score led to the creation of WrestleMania, with Hogan and Mr. T (backed by Snuka) taking on Piper and Orndorff in the main event (with Bob Orton, Jr, as Piper and Orndorff's manager). Orton's interference at the end of the match backfired when he accidentally hit Orndorff with the cast on his arm, allowing Hogan to pin Orndorff and win the match for his team. Blaming Orndorff for the loss, Piper and Orton attacked him on Saturday Night's Main Event I. Later in the evening, Orndorff ran to the ring to even the sides when Piper and Orton were preparing to double team Hogan. He solidified his babyface turn by publicly firing manager Bobby Heenan shortly afterwards.

==== Alliance with Hulk Hogan (1985–1986) ====
Orndorff and Hogan started teaming up to feud with Piper and Orton, facing them in tag team competition all over the country. Orndorff's feud with Piper and Orton continued to rage on while Hogan started to defend his title against other contenders; Orndorff faced both Orton and Piper in individual competition, usually without a conclusive outcome. After Orndorff fired Heenan as his manager, Heenan placed a $25,000 bounty on Orndorff, payable to anyone who could injure him. When no one succeeded, Heenan upped the bounty to $50,000. One of the first men to try to claim the new, higher bonus was Piper himself, but their matches got so out of hand that Bruno Sammartino was appointed as a special referee in the hopes of keeping the peace. Instead of keeping the peace, Sammartino became a target for Orton and Piper, which led to Orndorff and Sammartino teaming up. Orndorff teamed with a variety of opponents in his fights with Piper and Orton, including André the Giant. In February 1986, Heenan used a match between Hogan and Don Muraco as an opportunity to have King Kong Bundy attack Hogan, setting up their WrestleMania 2 match. While Hogan fought off Bundy, Orndorff battled Muraco in a match that ended in a double count out.

==== Feud with Hulk Hogan; arm injury (1986–1987) ====
Adrian Adonis took every opportunity that he could to mock Orndorff (including referring to him as "Hulk Jr."), saying that he had gone soft from teaming with Hogan. Adonis kept on irritating Orndorff, going so far as daring Orndorff to prove just how close his relationship with Hogan really was. During a televised phone call to Hogan, Orndorff was told that Hogan was too busy training to come to the phone, something which aggravated Orndorff no end. The next time that Hogan and Orndorff teamed up, against The Moondogs, Orndorff wrestled most of the match by himself in an attempt to upstage Hogan, scoring the winning pin. The next week, during a tag match where Hogan and Orndorff faced the massive duo of Big John Studd and Bundy, Hogan and Orndorff accidentally collided and Hogan knocked Orndorff off the apron. When Studd and Bundy started to double team Hogan, Orndorff did not help out; he looked like he had hurt his eye in the collision. It was not until Studd and Bundy had Hogan in a compromised position that Orndorff re-entered the ring to fend off Studd and Bundy. Orndorff then helped Hogan to his feet and raised his hand in the air, only to give Hogan a clothesline followed by a piledriver.

Orndorff soon reunited with manager Heenan and again feuded with Hogan, and began using Hogan's theme music, "Real American", as his own entrance theme. During the Hogan feud, Orndorff seriously injured his right arm in a weightlifting accident. Because he was in the middle of his big-money run with Hogan, he did not want to take the time off to have the surgery to properly treat it, opting instead to continue to wrestle. Their matches included a memorable outdoor match in Toronto at The Big Event which drew an estimated 76,000 fans. After a series of matches with no clean outcome it was decided that Hogan and Orndorff would clash in a steel cage match on Saturday Night's Main Event IX (which took place in December 1986 but aired in 1987). The cage match saw both Orndorff and Hogan climb over the top of the cage and touch the floor at the same time; heel referee Danny Davis, illegally at ringside, declared Orndorff the winner and assigned referee Joey Marella declared Hogan victorious. After reviewing the footage it was decided that it was a draw and the match was restarted. Once the match restarted, Hogan easily exited the cage to win the match following a leg drop, ending their feud. Their half-year-long feud is one of the most notable (and profitable) feuds in the history of pro wrestling.

After the program with Hogan ended, Orndorff worked a reduced schedule for a few months. In March 1987, he teamed with King Kong Bundy in the Frank Tunney Sr. Memorial Tag Team Tournament, defeating Bob Orton and Don Muraco in the first round but losing to the Killer Bees in the semi-finals. During March, he briefly reprised his feud with Hogan on several house shows before taking time off because of the injury. While Orndorff was away from the WWF, Heenan brought in a new man "Ravishing" Rick Rude to take Orndorff's place in the Heenan Family.

==== Feud with the Heenan Family (1987–1988) ====
Orndorff returned to the ring on June 2, 1987, in Buffalo, New York during a WWF Superstars of Wrestling taping. Orndorff (along with Bundy, who had been off TV since WrestleMania III as well) returned to team with Hercules and King Harley Race in a victory against Mario Mancini, Don Driggers, Paul Roma, and Jim Powers. Orndorff received a babyface response from the crowd during his return, leading the WWF to change his character. He fired Heenan two months later and began a feud with Rude. Orndorff took Oliver Humperdink as his manager in his fight with Rude and Heenan. Orndorff's last "big" appearance was at the inaugural Survivor Series on November 26, 1987, where he teamed with Hogan, Bam Bam Bigelow, Ken Patera, and Muraco to take on André, One Man Gang, Bundy, Rude, and Butch Reed. Early in the match, Rude eliminated Orndorff with a roll-up. His final match with the WWF came on a house show on January 4, 1988, against Rude in Augusta, Georgia.

=== Semi-retirement and return (1988–1990) ===
Paul Orndorff retired in early 1988 due to his arm injury and focused on running his bowling alley in Fayetteville. During his time away from wrestling he was actually reported to have died; the story made several newspapers. The time off was because of the injury to his arm/neck that he suffered during the Hogan feud and left untreated for too long. With the time off, Orndorff recovered and started working out, reestablishing the physique that earned him the nickname "Mr. Wonderful" in the first place. The only difference was that his right arm was noticeably smaller due to a neck injury that caused nerve damage and eventually the atrophy of his right biceps.

In 1990 Orndorff returned to the squared circle, wrestling a series of matches against Kerry Von Erich on the independent circuit.

=== World Championship Wrestling (1990) ===
In Spring 1990, Orndorff signed with WCW as a babyface. On the May 26 episode of World Championship Wrestling it was announced that Paul Orndorff would face Arn Anderson at Clash of the Champions XI. Orndorff made his in-ring debut on June 9 in Beckley, West Virginia, defeating "Nasty" Ned Brady on Main Event. Orndorff quickly became affiliated with a group called the "Dudes with Attitudes" consisting of himself, Sting, Lex Luger, Junkyard Dog, and The Steiner Brothers. The Dudes backed Sting in his fight with the Four Horsemen. At Clash of the Champions XI Orndorff defeated Anderson and at the 1990 Great American Bash, Orndorff teamed up with the Junkyard Dog and El Gigante to defeat Arn Anderson, Barry Windham, and Sid Vicious by disqualification. Throughout the summer, he faced Anderson and defeated the WCW TV Champion by pinfall in several non-title matchups. He also defeated "Mean" Mark Callous in multiple house show encounters. His final WCW match came on August 26 in Chicago when he teamed with The Junkyard Dog in a losing effort against the tag-team champions Doom. Orndorff departed from the promotion that fall.

=== UWF, AWF, and NWL (1990–1993) ===
By late 1990, Orndorff became one of the featured headliners for Herb Abrams' fledgling Universal Wrestling Federation. Televised on several cable outlets, the UWF saw many former WWF stars such as Don Muraco, Bob Orton, Jr., "Superfly" Jimmy Snuka, Lou Albano, and The Killer Bees (known as "Masked Confusion" in the UWF). Mr. Wonderful more or less immediately started feuding with "Dr. Death" Steve Williams, who attacked Orndorff to kickstart the feud. Orndorff and Williams clashed several times in what was promoted as the "Signature Feud" of the UWF in its early days. He also reignited his feud with Bob Orton, Jr. in the UWF, where he beat Orton for the UWF Southern States Championship on June 22, 1992, and held the title until he left the promotion. It was awarded back to Orton when Orndorff left the promotion. On June 9, 1991, Orndorff competed on the UWF's only PPV Beach Brawl, defeating Colonel DeBeers in a Strap match. Orndorff left the UWF sometime in early 1993, vacating the Southern States title.

While working for the UWF, Orndorff also competed in the American Wrestling Federation (not the same promotion as the AWF) and held the AWF Heavyweight title after beating Stan Lane on December 16, 1991. When Orndorff left the AWF in February 1992, he vacated the title. During this time Orndorff also worked in the National Wrestling League, holding its tag team championship alongside Brian Blair some time in 1993.

=== Smoky Mountain Wrestling (1992) ===
In 1992, Smoky Mountain Wrestling opened its doors for the first time as they announced a tournament to crown the first SMW Heavyweight Champion. Among the participants invited to compete were Buddy Landel, "Dirty White Boy" Tony Anthony, and Brian Lee. Orndorff was only listed as a "wild card" who had to win a match in order to enter the tournament. The "wild card" status was a blow to Orndoff's ego (storyline), causing him to attack several wrestlers including Hector Guerrero, whom he defeated in a "wild card" match to earn a spot in the tournament. Afterwards, Orndorff laid out Guerrero and several preliminary wrestlers with his piledriver finisher. Orndoff beat Tim Horner and Robert Gibson in the preliminary rounds to advance to the finals of the tournament. In the finals, Brian Lee won the title when Orndorff was disqualified.

Siding with the "Dirty White Boy" Tony Anthony, Orndorff feuded with Hector Guerrero and Brian Lee. Lee brought in Ron Garvin to fight off Orndorff; the feud included a featured "piledriver match", which Garvin won. Orndorff was fired from the SMW after piledriving a referee in frustration.

=== Return to WCW (1992–2001) ===
==== World Television Champion (1992–1993) ====
Orndorff returned to WCW in late 1992. In January 1993 he took on Cactus Jack, with the winner being manager Harley Race's chosen replacement for an injured Rick Rude at Clash of the Champions XXII. Race assisted Orndorff in the match and was quickly joined by Vader in his attack on Cactus Jack. After the match, Race declared that Paul Orndorff was his chosen man. Orndorff was pinned by Cactus Jack in a subsequent Thunderdome match; the two had an intense feud including a Falls Count Anywhere match at SuperBrawl III, which Cactus Jack won.

After the feud with Cactus cooled off, "Mr. Wonderful" set his sights on the vacant WCW World Television Championship. Orndorff signed up for a 16-man tournament beating 2 Cold Scorpio, Cactus Jack, Johnny B. Badd, and then Erik Watts in the finals to win his first title in WCW. Orndorff, the TV champion, and Rick Rude, the U.S. Champion, began teaming on a regular basis, including a PPV victory over Dustin Rhodes and Kensuke Sasaki at Slamboree. During this time Orndorff also turned back the challenges of Ron Simmons and Marcus Alexander Bagwell, amongst others, holding on to his Television title by any means necessary. Orndorff defeated Bagwell controversially, using the second rope for leverage during the pinfall. The two feuded over the WCW World Tag Team Championship. Orndorff's TV title reign also included a successful defence against future ECW champion Shane Douglas and a disqualification loss to Johnny B Badd, after Maxx Payne violently interfered. This led to a brief six man tag team alliance between Orndorff, Payne, and Chris Benoit. On August 18, 1993, Orndorff's luck ran out as Ricky Steamboat won the title at Clash of the Champions XXIV. After unsuccessfully challenging Ricky Steamboat throughout the fall and winter of 1993, Orndorff moved into the tag team division.

==== Pretty Wonderful (1993–1995) ====
After the 1993 WCW pay-per-view Battlebowl, Horsemen members Paul Roma and Arn Anderson faced the semi-regular team of Paul Orndorff and "Stunning" Steve Austin on WCW Saturday Night. During the match, Roma acted very indifferently to his tag team partner, sowing the seeds to his heel turn. A week later, Roma teamed with Erik Watts to take on the team of Orndorff and Lord Steven Regal. This time, Roma took it a step further and attacked Erik Watts before announcing that he was now teaming with Paul Orndorff.

Under the tutelage of manager Masked Assassin, the team quickly began to work well together in a feud with Marcus Alexander Bagwell and 2 Cold Scorpio. In the following months, both Roma and Orndorff focused on their individual careers before reuniting around May. This time they wrestled without their manager and were officially known as "Pretty Wonderful". With both men rededicated to teaming, they soon challenged for the WCW World Tag Team Championship then held by Cactus Jack and Kevin Sullivan. One incident especially stands out that established Pretty Wonderful in the title chase. The champions had one last defense against former champions the Nasty Boys that also saw Kevin's injured brother Dave. The match degraded into a brawl that saw Pretty Wonderful make an appearance using Dave's crutch to attack the champions. Before the team left the ring, they also took a couple of shots at the Nasty Boys for good measure.

Going into Bash at the Beach, Pretty Wonderful had the advantage as both champions were suffering from injuries inflicted by the challengers on previous occasions (kayfabe). Cactus Jack and Kevin Sullivan were unable to hold off Roma and Orndorff, as Pretty Wonderful left the ring with the gold. Pretty Wonderful was immediately challenged by the Nasty Boys after winning the title, but the Nasty Boys were never able to take the gold from the champions. Next, Pretty Wonderful was challenged by the duo of Stars and Stripes (Marcus Alexander Bagwell and The Patriot) at Fall Brawl. The champions retained, but a week later the championship changed hands when Stars and Stripes got the victory. Pretty Wonderful was granted a rematch against the new champions with a match booked for Halloween Havoc; Pretty Wonderful regained the belts when Roma used one of them to knock Bagwell out.

During a February 5, 1995 taping of WCW Worldwide, Orndorff crossed paths with Hogan for the first time since 1987. The duo of Hulk Hogan and Randy Savage faced Pretty Wonderful in a televised match which the latter lost. This was the only time Orndorff and Hogan wrestled each other in WCW.

At Clash of the Champions XXIX Stars and Stripes were granted a final shot at the tag team title, but the challengers also had to put up the Patriot's mask on the line. After a controversial double pin finish, Stars and Stripes were declared the winners and thus the champions, putting the end to Pretty Wonderful's second and final run with the gold.

==== Retirement and various appearances (1995–2001) ====
Orndorff returned to singles competition with his most notable match at the time being an unsuccessful shot at the IWGP Heavyweight Championship when he faced champion the Great Muta at Slamboree. In May, Orndorff got a golden opportunity to regain the WCW Television title. He defeated Brian Pillman in a tournament to earn the shot at the champion. He lost to WCW newcomer The Renegade at Bash at the Beach. Orndorff was also unable to beat the rookie in subsequent matches and (in kayfabe) began to lose confidence in his abilities. After losing more and more matches, including a match on WorldWide to Randy Savage, Orndorff lost all faith in his abilities; the outwardly arrogant Mr. Wonderful was riddled with self-doubt, until one night, after beating himself up backstage after yet another loss, he was visited by psychic Gary Spivey. Spivey convinced Orndorff to believe in himself and that he shouldn't forget that he was "Mr. Wonderful".

On the December 11, 1995 episode of Monday Nitro, Orndorff confronted Brian Pillman after Pillman made derogatory comments about Orndorff. After telling Flair and Anderson how much he respected them, Orndorff told Pillman that he could have been a Horseman and the only reason Pillman was a Horseman was because he was also offered to be one, but turned it down. Anderson and Flair tried to calm Orndorff down but Orndorff lost his temper and attacked Pillman. Pillman, Flair, and Anderson attacked Orndorff and then Arn Anderson and Ric Flair delivered a spike piledriver to Orndorff on the arena floor during the attack. WCW later explained that Orndorff had been seriously hurt in the attack and that his career was over. In actuality, Orndorff was forced to retire due to his previous injuries in the WWF, with the entire right side of his body beginning to atrophy (eventually causing his arm and leg muscles to shrink). It was something he had worked through as best he could but by the end of 1995 he was forced to retire and started to work as a trainer and a road agent for WCW.

On December 13, 1999, Orndorff wrestled against the Harris Twins in a handicap match by a losing effort on Monday Night Nitro. At the 2000 Fall Brawl, in a match between The Filthy Animals and The Natural Born Thrillers, Orndorff suffered a neck injury after delivering a piledriver. The referee, Charles Robinson stopped the match as a result. After Orndorff retired for a final time, he began to run the WCW Power Plant, where he trained several wrestlers including The Natural Born Thrillers. He had a brief onscreen role during this time in the Old Age Outlaws with Terry Funk, Arn Anderson, and Larry Zbyszko to feud with the last WCW version of the nWo.

=== Post-retirement appearances (2005–2017) ===
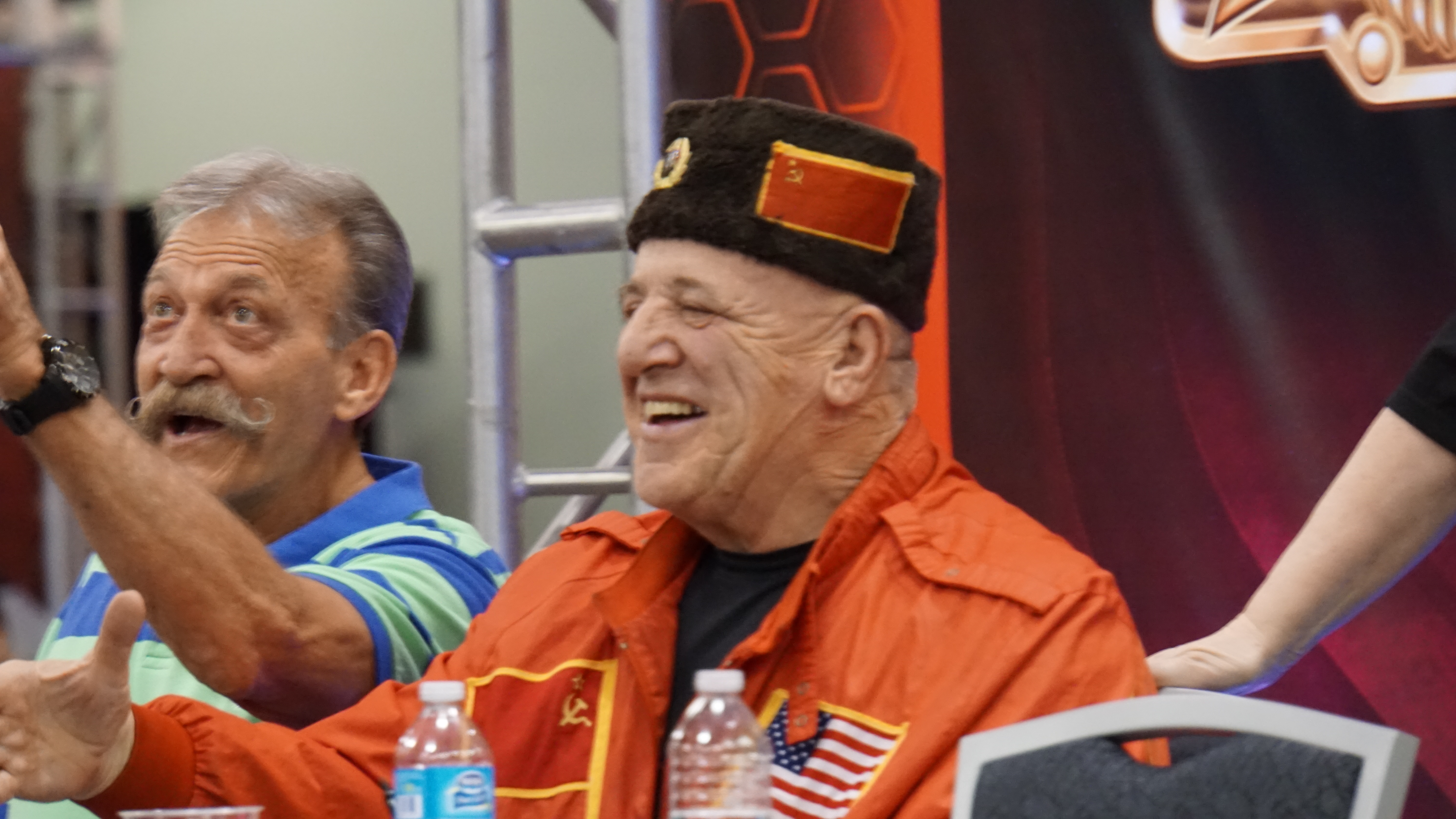
Orndorff and Nikolai Volkoff, 2015

On February 3, 2005, Orndorff was announced as one of the inductees for the Class of 2005 into the WWE Hall of Fame. He was inducted on April 2 at the Universal Amphitheatre in Los Angeles by Bobby Heenan. In 2009, Orndorff was elected by a committee of his peers to the Professional Wrestling Hall of Fame, then located in Amsterdam, New York, now located in Wichita Falls, Texas. On April 6, 2014, Orndorff made an appearance at WrestleMania XXX, marking his first time on WWE television since the 2005 Hall of Fame. He appeared in a segment with his WrestleMania I teammate Roddy Piper and their opponents from the event, Hulk Hogan and Mr. T, as well as the referee for the match, Pat Patterson, interrupting Hogan's interview with Gene Okerlund. On August 11, 2014, Orndorff made an appearance at Hogan's birthday celebration on WWE Raw, celebrating in the ring with many other WWE legends, including Hogan himself, Ric Flair, Kevin Nash, Scott Hall, Okerlund, Jimmy Hart, and Piper. On May 3, 2017, aged 67, Orndorff had his final match, and first since 2000, winning a six-man tag at a Canadian Wrestling's Elite (CWE) show in Brandon, Manitoba.

== Personal life ==
Orndorff's parents were both of German descent. His father died of cancer in 1965. He resided in Fayetteville, Georgia. He married his high school girlfriend Ronda Maxwell Orndorff. They had two grown sons, Paul Orndorff III and Travis Orndorff, as well as eight grandchildren. Paul had one sister, Patricia Orndorff, and two brothers named Mickey Ronald Cain, and Terry Orndorff, with whom he wrestled briefly as a tag team in the early 1980s. Terry went on to have limited success as a tag team wrestler with other partners such as The Junkyard Dog and Kerry Von Erich.

On January 5, 2011, Orndorff told the Busted Open Sirius Satellite Radio show that he had recently been diagnosed with throat cancer. He was reportedly in critical condition and was on a feeding tube with a few days to live. On August 10, he announced it was gone.

In July 2016, Orndorff was named part of a class action lawsuit filed against WWE which alleged that wrestlers incurred "long term neurological injuries" and that the company "routinely failed to care" for them and "fraudulently misrepresented and concealed" the nature and extent of those injuries. The suit was litigated by attorney Konstantine Kyros, who led a number of other lawsuits against WWE. In September 2018, US District Judge Vanessa Lynne Bryant dismissed the case, ruling that some of its claims were frivolous and some had been filed after the statute of limitations had expired. In September 2020, an appeal was dismissed by a federal appeals court.

On May 8, 2021, Orndorff's son Travis posted a video of him at a medical facility, where he was seen in a state of reported dementia. He believed that his father's dementia was a result of chronic traumatic encephalopathy (CTE).

== Death ==
On July 12, 2021, Orndorff died of dementia at the age of 71 in Atlanta, Georgia.

== Championships and accomplishments ==
=== College football ===
- University of Tampa Athletic Hall of Fame (Class of 1986)

=== Professional wrestling ===
- American Wrestling Federation
  - AWF Heavyweight Championship (1 time)
- Cauliflower Alley Club
  - Men's Wrestling Award (2016)
- George Tragos/Lou Thesz Professional Wrestling Hall of Fame
  - Class of 2017
- Georgia Championship Wrestling
  - NWA National Heavyweight Championship (3 times)
- National Wrestling Alliance
  - NWA Hall of Fame (Class of 2009)
- National Wrestling League
  - NWL Tag Team Championship (1 time) – with Brian Blair
- NWA Mid-America
  - Mid-America World Six-Man Tag Team Championship (1 time) – with Gorgeous George Jr. and Tommy Gilbert
  - NWA Southern Heavyweight Championship (Memphis version) (1 time)
- NWA Tri-State / Mid-South Wrestling Association
  - Mid-South North American Heavyweight Championship (5 times)
  - Mid-South Tag Team Championship (1 time) – with Ted Dibiase
- Peach State Wrestling
  - PSW Cordele City Heavyweight Championship (1 time)
- Professional Wrestling Hall of Fame and Museum
  - Class of 2009
- Pro Wrestling Illustrated
  - Feud of the Year (1986) vs. Hulk Hogan
  - Match of the Year (1985) with Roddy Piper vs. Hulk Hogan and Mr. T at WrestleMania
  - Most Hated Wrestler of the Year (1986)
  - Ranked No. 38 of the 500 top wrestlers in the PWI 500 in 1993
- Pro Wrestling This Week
  - Wrestler of the Week (August 23–29, 1987)
- Southeastern Championship Wrestling
  - NWA Southeastern Tag Team Championship (2 times) – with Dick Slater (1) and Norvell Austin (1)
- Universal Wrestling Federation
  - UWF Southern States Championship (1 time)
- Mid-Atlantic Championship Wrestling/World Championship Wrestling
  - WCW World Television Championship (1 time)
  - NWA/WCW World Tag Team Championship (3 times) – with Jimmy Snuka (1) and Paul Roma (2)
  - Slim Jim Challenge (1995)
  - WCW World Television Championship Tournament (1993)
- World Wrestling Entertainment
  - WWE Hall of Fame (Class of 2005)
- Wrestling Observer Newsletter
  - Feud of the Year (1986) vs. Hulk Hogan
  - Wrestling Observer Newsletter Hall of Fame (2024)

== See also ==
- List of gridiron football players who became professional wrestlers
