= King of the Ring (1985) =

Professional wrestling tournament by World Wrestling Federation

- Promotion: World Wrestling Federation
- Date: July 8, 1985
- City: Foxborough, Massachusetts
- Venue: Sullivan Stadium
- Attendance: 23,000

King of the Ring tournament chronology
← Previous; First	Next → 1986

The 1985 King of the Ring was the inaugural King of the Ring professional wrestling tournament produced by the World Wrestling Federation (WWF, now WWE). The tournament was held on July 8, 1985, at the Sullivan Stadium in Foxborough, Massachusetts, as a special non-televised house show. The Magnificent Muraco won the inaugural 1985 tournament. In addition to the tournament, there was only one other match during the night. In this match Hulk Hogan pinned Nikolai Volkoff in order to retain the WWF World Heavyweight Championship. Only the finals of the tournament and the main event were shown through closed circuit (CCTV). The event drew 23,000 people of whom 20,000 were paid.

== Production ==
=== Background ===
In 1985, to boost attendance at their house shows, the World Wrestling Federation (WWF, now WWE) scheduled their July 8, 1985, event as a tournament called the King of the Ring. It was a single-elimination tournament in where the winner would be crowned the "King of the Ring." The inaugural tournament was held at the Sullivan Stadium in Foxborough, Massachusetts, as a special non-televised house show.

== Aftermath ==
A second tournament was scheduled for 1986, also as a non-televised house show, thus establishing the King of the Ring tournament as an annual event. The event continued to be held as a special non-televised house show up through 1989 and in 1991; a tournament was not held in 1990. A tournament was also not held in 1992, but returned in 1993, this time as a pay-per-view (PPV) entitled King of the Ring. Only the final few matches of the tournament took place at the PPV, with the first few tournament matches being held prior to the PPV. The PPV would continue until 2002, the same year that the WWF was renamed to World Wrestling Entertainment (WWE), after which the tournament would only be periodically held across episodes of Raw and SmackDown. However, the final match of the 2006 tournament took place at the Judgment Day PPV, while the semifinals and finals of the 2015 tournament aired as a WWE Network-exclusive event.

== Results ==
No.	Results	Stipulations
1	Jim Brunzell defeated The Spoiler	King of the Ring tournament first round match
2	Tito Santana defeated Terry Funk by disqualification	King of the Ring tournament first round match
3	The Iron Sheik defeated B. Brian Blair	King of the Ring tournament first round match
4	Ricky Steamboat defeated Greg Valentine	King of the Ring tournament first round match
5	Les Thornton defeated Steve Lombardi	King of the Ring tournament first round match
6	The Magnificent Muraco defeated Junkyard Dog	King of the Ring tournament first round match
7	Pedro Morales defeated Johnny V	King of the Ring tournament first round match
8	Paul Orndorff vs. Bob Orton, Jr. ended in a double disqualification	King of the Ring tournament first round match
9	Jim Brunzell defeated Tito Santana	King of the Ring tournament quarterfinal match
10	The Iron Sheik defeated Ricky Steamboat	King of the Ring tournament quarterfinal match
11	The Magnificent Muraco defeated Les Thornton	King of the Ring tournament quarterfinal match
12	The Iron Sheik defeated Jim Brunzell	King of the Ring tournament semifinal match
13	The Magnificent Muraco defeated Pedro Morales	King of the Ring tournament semifinal match
14	The Magnificent Muraco defeated The Iron Sheik	King of the Ring tournament final match
15	Hulk Hogan (c) defeated Nikolai Volkoff	Singles match for the WWF World Heavyweight Championship
(c) / – the champion(s) heading into the match

=== Tournament bracket ===
First Round
The Magnificent Muraco	PIN
Junkyard Dog	10:58
Les Thornton	PIN
Steve Lombardi	6:43
Paul Orndorff	DDQ
Bob Orton, Jr.	15:06
Pedro Morales	PIN
Johnny V	1:06
Tito Santana	DQ
Terry Funk	13:48
Jim Brunzell	PIN
The Spoiler	7:15
Ricky Steamboat	PIN
Greg Valentine	19:59
The Iron Sheik	PIN
B. Brian Blair	8:06

Quarterfinals
The Magnificent Muraco	PIN
Les Thornton	6:22
BYE
Pedro Morales
Tito Santana	Draw^{1}
Jim Brunzell	20:00
Ricky Steamboat	10:55
The Iron Sheik	PIN

Semifinals
The Magnificent Muraco	PIN
Pedro Morales	14:52
Jim Brunzell	7:43
Iron Sheik	PIN

Final
The Magnificent Muraco	PIN
Iron Sheik	12:55

Hulk Hogan (c) defeated Nikolai Volkoff

1. Tito Santana fought Jim Brunzell to a time limit draw; Brunzell then won a coin toss to determine who would continue in the tournament.
