= The Grand Wizard =

The Grand Wizard may refer to:

- "The Grand Wizard of Wrestling", Ernie Roth
- Grand Wizard, a title in the hierarchy of the Ku Klux Klan
