= WWE Hall of Fame (2004) =

WWE Hall of Fame induction ceremony

- DVD cover featuring wrestlers inducted into the Hall of Fame class of 2004
- Promotion: WWE
- Date: March 13, 2004
- City: New York City, New York
- Venue: Hilton Midtown

WWE Hall of Fame chronology
← Previous; 1996	Next → 2005

WWE Hall of Fame (2004) was the event which featured the introduction of the 5th class to the WWE Hall of Fame. The event was produced by World Wrestling Entertainment (WWE) on March 13, 2004, from the Hilton Midtown in New York City, New York. It was the first Hall of Fame event held since the suspension of the event in 1996. The event was hosted by Gene Okerlund.

In 2004, WWE relaunched the Hall of Fame to coincide with WrestleMania XX. This ceremony, like its predecessors, was not broadcast on television, however, it was released on DVD in June 2004. In March 2015 the ceremony was added to the WWE Network.

== Inductees ==
=== Individual ===
Image	Ring name (Birth Name)	Inducted by	WWE recognized accolades
	Big John Studd (John Minton)	Big Show	Posthumous inductee: Represented by his son John Minton Jr. One-time WWWF World Tag Team Champion; 1989 Royal Rumble winner
	Don Muraco	Mick Foley	Two-time ECW Heavyweight Champion; Two-time WWF Intercontinental Heavyweight Champion; First winner of the King of the Ring tournament
	Greg Valentine (Jonathan Wisniski)	Jimmy Hart	Two-time NWA United States Heavyweight Champion; Four-time NWA World Tag Team Champion; One-time WWF Intercontinental Heavyweight Champion; One-time WWF Tag Team Champion
	Harley Race	Ric Flair	Eight-time NWA World Heavyweight Champion; One-time and first NWA United States Heavyweight Champion; Three-time AWA World Tag Team Champion; 1986 WWF King of the Ring winner
	Jesse Ventura (James George Janos)	Tyrel Ventura	One-time AWA World Tag Team Champion; Former commentator in WWF and WCW; 38th Governor of Minnesota
	Junkyard Dog (Sylvester Ritter)	Ernie Ladd	Posthumous inductee: Represented by his daughter LaToya Ritter. Held 15 championships while wrestling in the Mid-South Wrestling Association including four reigns as Mid-South North American Heavyweight Champion
	Sgt. Slaughter (Robert Remus)	Pat Patterson	One-time WWF Heavyweight Champion; Two-time NWA United States Heavyweight Champion; One-time NWA World Tag Team Champion (Mid-Atlantic version)
	"Superstar" Billy Graham (Eldridge Wayne Coleman)	Triple H	One-time WWWF Heavyweight Champion
	Tito Santana (Merced Solis)	Shawn Michaels	Two-time WWF Intercontinental Heavyweight Champion; 1989 King of the Ring; Two-time WWF Tag Team Champion
	Bobby "The Brain" Heenan (Raymond Heenan)	Blackjack Lanza	Former commentator and long-time manager in AWA, WWF and WCW

=== Celebrity ===
Image	Recipient (Birth name)	Occupation	Inducted by	Appearances
	Pete Rose	Baseball player	Kane	Appeared at WrestleManias XIV, XV, and 2000
