= WWE Hall of Fame (2005) =

WWE Hall of Fame induction ceremony

- Promotion: WWE
- Date: April 2, 2005
- City: Los Angeles, California
- Venue: Universal Amphitheatre

WWE Hall of Fame chronology
| ← Previous; 2004 | Next → 2006 |

WWE Hall of Fame (2005) was the event which featured introduction of the 6th class to the WWE Hall of Fame. The event was produced by World Wrestling Entertainment (WWE) on April 2, 2005, from the Universal Amphitheatre in Los Angeles, California. The event took place the same weekend as WrestleMania 21. The event was hosted by Gene Okerlund. A condensed version of the ceremony aired that evening on Spike TV, making this ceremony the first to be broadcast on television. In March 2015 the ceremony was added to the WWE Network.

== Inductees ==
=== Individual ===
- Class headliners appear in **boldface**

| Image | Ring name (birth name) | Inducted by | WWE recognized accolades |
|---|---|---|---|
| | **Hulk Hogan** (Terry Bollea) | Sylvester Stallone | Six-time WWF/E (Heavyweight) Champion; Six-time and longest reigning WCW World Heavyweight Champion; One-time WWE World Tag Team Champion; Two-time Royal Rumble winner (1990, 1991) |
| | "Rowdy" Roddy Piper (Roderick Toombs) | Ric Flair | One-time WWF Intercontinental Heavyweight Champion; Three-time NWA/WCW United States Heavyweight Champion; Host of Piper's Pit; In 2006, Piper also won the World Tag Team Championship. |
| | "Cowboy" Bob Orton Jr. | Randy Orton | Held numerous NWA regional titles |
| | Jimmy Hart | Jerry Lawler | One-time AWA Southern Heavyweight Champion; Long-time manager in WWF and WCW |
| | "Mr. Wonderful" Paul Orndorff | Bobby Heenan | Four-time NWA National Heavyweight Champion; One-time WCW World Television Champion; Three-time WCW World Tag Team Champion |
| | Nikolai Volkoff (Josip Peruzovic) | Jim Ross | Three-time WWWF International Tag Team Champion; One-time WWF Tag Team Champion |
| | Iron Sheik (Hossein Vaziri) | Sgt. Slaughter | One-time WWF World Heavyweight Champion; One-time WWF Tag Team Champion |

== Aftermath ==
On July 24, 2015, WWE terminated their contract with Hulk Hogan, stating that they are "committed to embracing and celebrating individuals from all backgrounds", although Hogan's lawyer said Hogan chose to resign. A day prior, WWE removed virtually all references to Hogan from their website, including his entry from its WWE Hall of Fame page. The termination coincided with the publication by the National Enquirer and Radar Online of an anti-black rant made by Hogan on his controversial leaked sex tape in which he is heard expressing disgust with the notion of his daughter with any black man, referenced by repeated use of the racial slur "nigger". Hogan also admitted to being "a racist, to a point". However, no official statement about his removal had been made and he was still listed in the Hall of Fame entry of the official WWE encyclopedia released in October 2016.

On July 15, 2018, despite no prior official statements by the WWE declaring his removal from the Hall of Fame, Hogan was reinstated into the Hall of Fame, after his numerous public apologies over the past year, as well as volunteering work.
