= Junkyard Dog =

American professional wrestler (1952–1998)

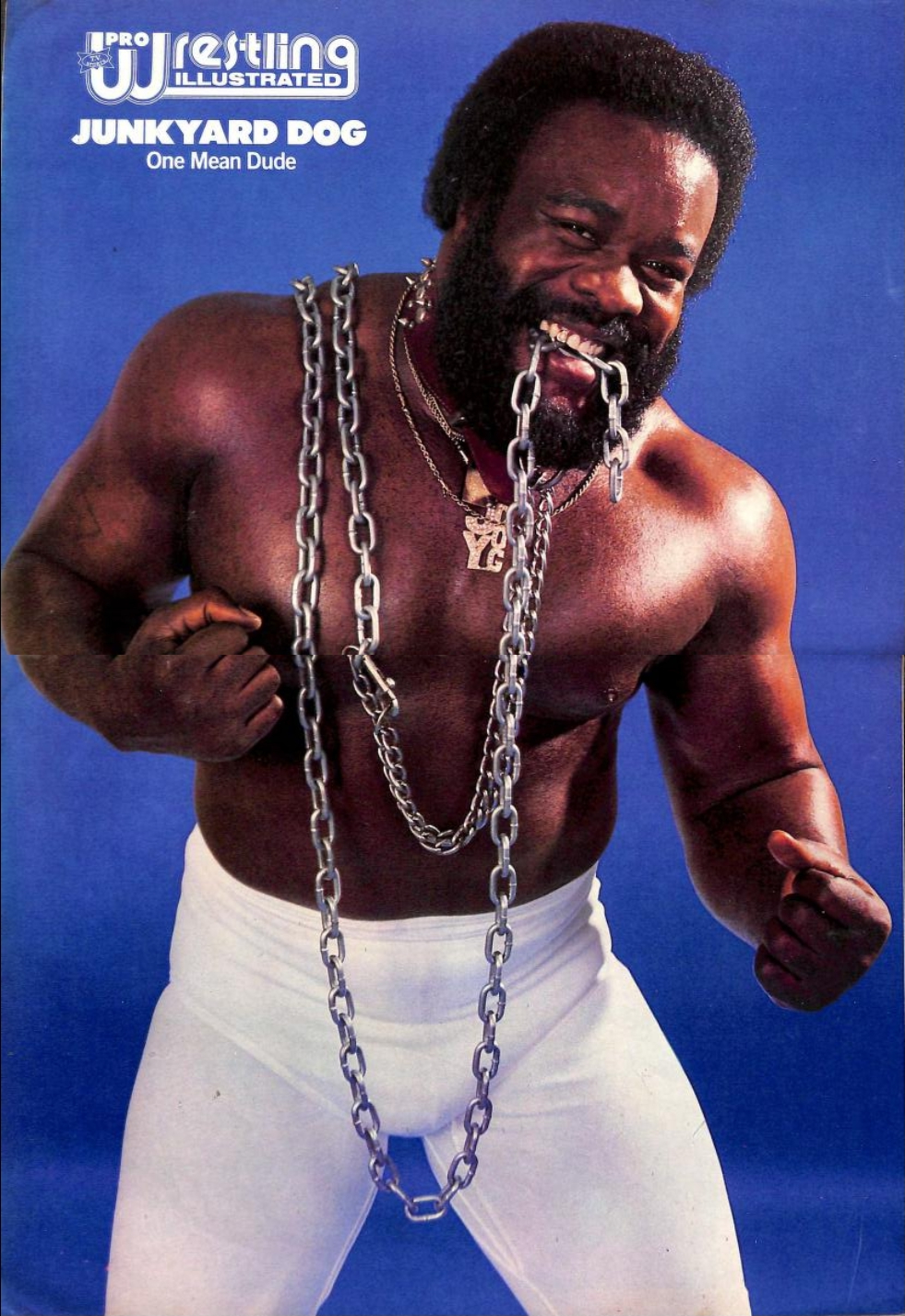
- Ritter, c. 1983

Personal information
- Born: Sylvester Ritter; December 13, 1952 Wadesboro, North Carolina, U.S.
- Died: June 1, 1998 (aged 45) Forest, Mississippi, U.S.
- Education: Fayetteville State University

Professional wrestling career
- Ring name(s): Big Daddy Ritter; Junkyard Dog; Leroy Rochester; Stagger Lee
- Billed height: 6 ft 3 in (1.91 m)
- Billed weight: 280 lb (130 kg)
- Billed from: Charlotte, North Carolina; Tennessee
- Trained by: Sonny King
- Debut: 1977
- Retired: 1997

Sylvester Ritter (December 13, 1952 – June 1, 1998) was an American professional wrestler and college football player, known by the ring name Junkyard Dog. He was best known for his time in Mid-South Wrestling, where he held the Mid-South North American Heavyweight Championship, and the World Wrestling Federation.

He was known for entering the ring with his trademark chain attached to a dog collar, headlining cards that drew large crowds and regularly sold out the Louisiana Superdome and other major venues. WWE author Brian Shields called him one of the most electrifying and charismatic wrestlers in the country, particularly during his peak in the early 1980s. Junkyard Dog was also known for his upper body strength, which saw him regularly body slam large wrestlers. The word "thump," which referred to his powerslam maneuver, was prominently displayed on his wrestling trunks. He was posthumously inducted into the WWE Hall of Fame in 2004.

== Early life and football career ==
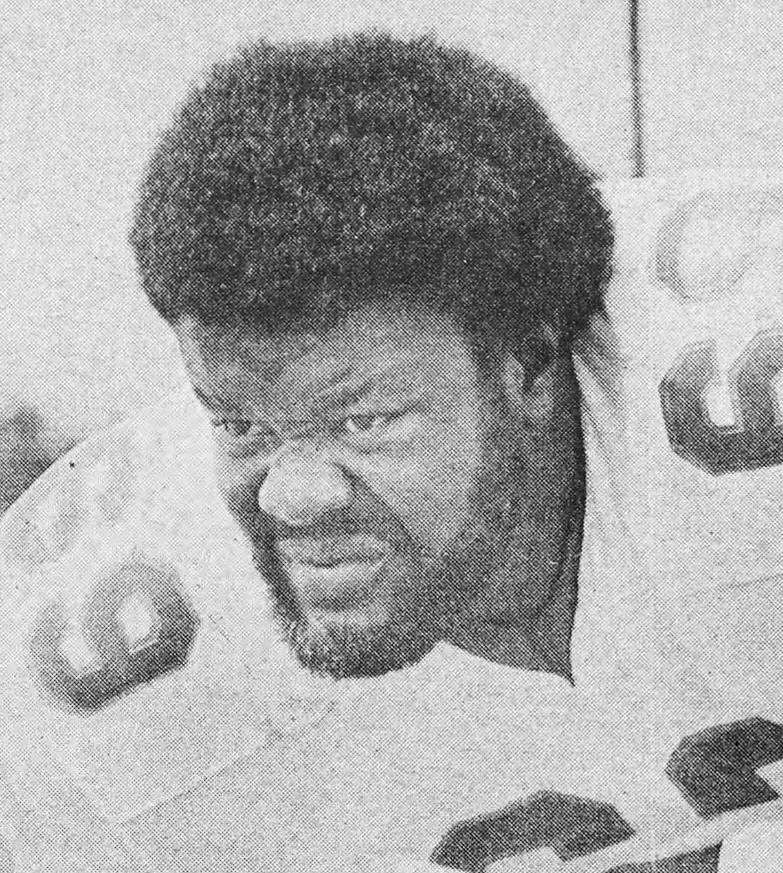
Ritter playing football in 1975

Ritter played football at Fayetteville State University, twice earning honorable mention All-American status. He graduated in 1975 with a political science degree and a minor in geography. He then signed with the Green Bay Packers in April 1976. Ritter was placed on injured reserve after suffering a knee injury during the offseason. He was waived from injured reserve in October 1976.

== Professional wrestling career ==
=== Early career (1977–1979) ===
Ritter debuted in 1977, initially wrestling for NWA Tri-State, the Continental Wrestling Association and Southeastern Championship Wrestling under his real name. In late 1977, Ritter moved to Nick Gulas's NWA Mid America promotion and adopted the ring name "Leroy Rochester". Afterwards, he wrestled in Germany. He worked for Stu Hart's Stampede Wrestling promotion the following year as "Big Daddy Ritter", holding the Stampede North American Heavyweight Championship twice.

=== Mid-South Wrestling (1979–1984) ===
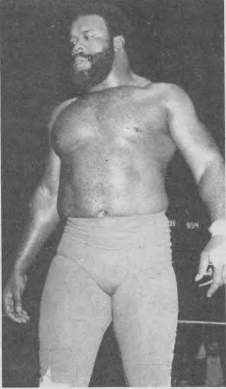
Junkyard Dog, c. 1982

In September 1979, Ritter moved to Mid-South Wrestling, where booker "Cowboy" Bill Watts gave him the name and gimmick of Junkyard Dog, taken from Jim Croce's song "Bad, Bad Leroy Brown". Sporting a long chain attached to a dog collar and white boots, he originally came to the ring pushing a cart filled with junk called the "junk wagon" and lost most of his early matches before his character caught on and became the top face in the company. He feuded with some of Mid-South's top heels.

In April 1980, Junkyard Dog and Buck Robley defeated the Fabulous Freebirds for the Mid-South Tag Team Championship. This led to a match on June 9, 1980 in the Municipal Auditorium putting Robley and Junkyard Dog against Freebirds Terry Gordy and Buddy Roberts (accompanied by Michael "P.S." Hayes), with the stipulation that the loser would have their hair removed. After Robley lost the match and the titles, Hayes poured hair removal cream in Junkyard Dog's eyes, (kayfabe) blinding him. The angle saw Junkyard Dog seemingly forced to retire from wrestling; after he gave a promo in which he revealed that he could not see his new-born daughter, the heat on the Freebirds became extreme, with fans attempting to attack them. The Freebirds added to the heat by appearing on television wearing dark glasses and carrying canes to mock the blinded Junkyard Dog. Junkyard Dog returned to the ring on August 2, 1980 at Mid-South Wrestling's "Superdome Extravaganza" show in New Orleans' Louisiana Superdome, defeating Hayes in a steel cage dog collar match. Junkyard Dog went on to face Hayes and the Freebirds in a series of violent matches, including dog collar matches, cage matches, "Jim Bowie" death matches, and loser leaves town matches. The feud culminated in a lights out no disqualification match in the Riverside Centroplex in Baton Rouge, Louisiana on November 4, 1980 where Junkyard Dog and Bill Watts defeated Hayes and Gordy.

A survey which was conducted among New Orleans school children during the 1981–82 academic year found that Junkyard Dog was the overwhelmingly preferred choice among local sports stars who New Orleans schoolchildren wanted to meet the most, even more popular than renowned local athletes Archie Manning and "Pistol" Pete Maravich. In addition, Junkyard Dog would also gain notoriety for being a black American who headlined a wrestling promotion at a time when black Americans in other wrestling promotions were largely billed as side acts.

Junkyard Dog was also involved in other notable feuds with Ted DiBiase and Butch Reed. Once Junkyard Dog's friend and tag team partner, DiBiase turned heel and won a loser leaves town match against Junkyard Dog with the help of a loaded glove, which was a DiBiase calling card, forcing Junkyard Dog to leave town for an extended period of time. In 1982, Junkyard Dog defeated Nick Bockwinkel in a cross promotional match for NWA and AWA that aired on NWA Mid South Wrestling and AWA programming. A masked man physically resembling Junkyard Dog, known as "Stagger Lee", subsequently appeared in the region and began to defeat the competition, one by one, including DiBiase. DiBiase and the other heels strongly suspected that Lee was in fact Junkyard Dog, but were unable to unmask him. Stagger Lee disappeared once the loser-leave-town clause in the Junkyard Dog-DiBiase match had expired, and Junkyard Dog returned and reclaimed the North American Heavyweight Championship.

While in Mid-South Wrestling, Junkyard Dog would use various entrance themes, such as Queen's "Another One Bites The Dust" and George Clinton's "Atomic Dog."

=== World Wrestling Federation (1984–1988) ===
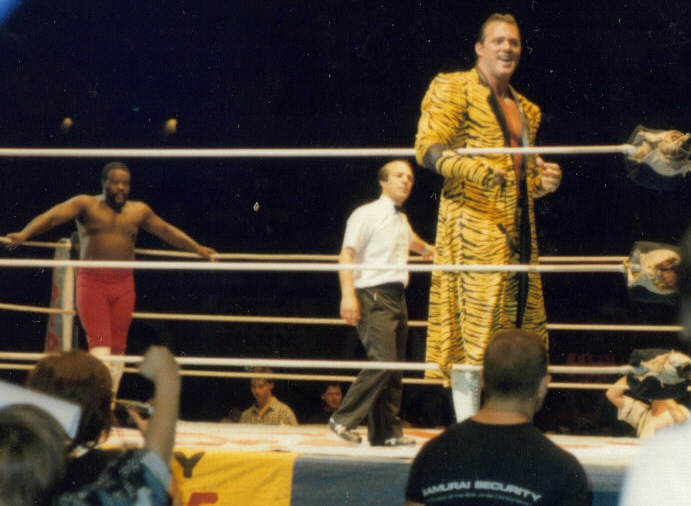
Junkyard Dog (left) and Brutus Beefcake in 1986

In the summer of 1984, Ritter left Mid-South at the peak of his feud with Reed for the World Wrestling Federation (WWF). He initially used "Another One Bites the Dust" as his theme on a regular basis and made a habit of interacting with the growing number of young people in attendance, often bringing them into the ring after matches and dancing with them. He was eventually given his own theme, "Grab Them Cakes," which he co-sang with Vicki Sue Robinson.

On March 31, 1985, he wrestled at the inaugural WrestleMania, defeating WWF Intercontinental Champion Greg Valentine by count-out, but not winning the title. In July, he lost to Don Muraco in the first round of the inaugural King of the Ring tournament. On November 7, Junkyard Dog won The Wrestling Classic tournament by defeating The Iron Sheik, Moondog Spot and Randy Savage by count-out in the finals. Junkyard Dog was subsequently involved in feuds with the likes of Adrian Adonis and the Funk Brothers (Hoss Funk and Terry Funk).

A feud with King of the Ring winner Harley Race led to a match between the two at WrestleMania III on March 29, 1987, where Junkyard Dog lost and had to bow down to Race per the stipulation. He competed in the Royal Rumble match at the inaugural Royal Rumble on January 24, 1988, but was eliminated by Dino Bravo. Lost to Rick Rude at the inaugural SummerSlam on August 29. His last match in the WWF was a tour in Europe on October 16, 1988, when he teamed with Brian Blair lost to Akeem and Harley Race in Rome, Italy.

=== Jim Crockett Promotions / World Championship Wrestling (1988–1993) ===
Junkyard Dog made his debut for Jim Crockett Promotions at Clash of the Champions IV on December 7, 1988, during an altercation between the Russian Assassins and Ivan Koloff, saving the latter. At Clash of the Champions VI on April 2, 1989, he defeated former rival Butch Reed. Before the match, he was accompanied to the ring by a jazz band. Junkyard Dog was fired from the company in May 1989 after no-showing a live appearance and missing the WrestleWar '89: Music City Showdown pay-per-view .

Following his surprise return at Capital Combat on May 19, 1990, Junkyard Dog began a main event run and quickly became embroiled in a feud with Ric Flair for the NWA World Heavyweight Championship, garnering several non-title victories. On June 13, Junkyard Dog defeated Flair by disqualification at Clash of the Champions XI, but did not win the title. Junkyard Dog then part of the short-lived "Dudes with Attitudes" faction along with Sting, Paul Orndorff, and El Gigante. On February 17, 1991, he teamed with Ricky Morton and Tommy Rich, defeating Dr. X, Dutch Mantell and Buddy Landel to win the WCW World Six-Man Tag Team Championship. They held the titles until June 3, when they were defeated by the Fabulous Freebirds.

After dropping a significant amount of weight to improve his conditioning, Junkyard Dog returned to action on February 29, 1992, at SuperBrawl II, saving Ron Simmons from an attack by Abdullah the Butcher. He went on to wrestle in tag team matches with Simmons, Barry Windham, or Big Josh for the next few months. In April and again in June, Junkyard Dog faced former Six-Man Championship partner Ricky Morton, defeating him on each occasion. He also formed another tag team, this time with Big Cat. They feuded with the Vegas Connection for the rest of the summer. In April 1993, he formed a new team with Jim Neidhart and began a feud with Dick Slater and Paul Orndorff that would last the next few months. He left the promotion in July 1993.

=== Late career (1993–1998) ===
After WCW, Junkyard Dog wrestled on the independent circuit, most notably for NWA Dallas and the National Wrestling Conference. He was the founder of the "Dog Pound" stable in an independent Mid-South promotion based in southern Louisiana. He wrestled his last match in 1995.

After largely stepping back from wrestling, Ritter worked at a Walmart in Las Vegas and had a part-time job repossessing cars. On May 3, 1998, he made his last major appearance at Extreme Championship Wrestling's Wrestlepalooza event. He also trained former WWF wrestler Rodney Mack.

== Death ==
At around 11:40 a.m. on June 1, 1998, Ritter died in a single-car accident on Interstate 20 near Forest, Mississippi. He was returning home from his daughter LaToya's high school graduation in Wadesboro, North Carolina when his car rolled three times after he fell asleep at the wheel. He was 45 years old. WWF paid tribute to Junkyard Dog on the June 8, 1998 episode of WWF "Raw is War" a week after his death.

== Championships and accomplishments ==
- Mid-South Wrestling Association
  - Mid-South Louisiana Championship (3 times)
  - Mid-South North American Heavyweight Championship (4 times)
  - Mid-South Tag Team Championship (8 times) – with Buck Robley (1), Terry Orndorff (1), Killer Karl Kox (1), Dick Murdoch (3), Mike George (1), and Mr. Olympia (1)
- Memphis Wrestling Hall of Fame
  - Class of 2022
- NWA Mid-America
  - NWA Mid-America Tag Team Championship (1 time) – with Gypsy Joe
- Pro Wrestling Illustrated
  - Inspirational Wrestler of the Year (1980)
  - Ranked No. 51 of the 500 best singles wrestlers of the "PWI Years" in 2003
- Professional Wrestling Hall of Fame
  - Class of 2012
- Stampede Wrestling
  - Stampede North American Heavyweight Championship (2 times)
- United States Wrestling Association
  - USWA Unified World Heavyweight Championship (1 time)
- World Championship Wrestling
  - WCW World Six-Man Tag Team Championship (1 time) – with Ricky Morton and Tommy Rich
- World Wrestling Federation / Entertainment
  - The Wrestling Classic (1985)
  - WWE Hall of Fame (Class of 2004)
  - Slammy Award (1 time)
    - Best Single Performer (1986)
- Wrestling Observer Newsletter
  - Feud of the Year (1982) vs. Ted DiBiase
  - Worst Feud of the Year (1990) vs. Ric Flair
  - Worst Tag Team (1986) with George Steele

== See also ==
- List of gridiron football players who became professional wrestlers
- List of premature professional wrestling deaths
