= Terry Orndorff =

American professional wrestler (born 1951)

Personal information
- Born: Terry Orndorff; October 7, 1951 (age 75) Winchester, Virginia, U.S.
- Family: Paul Orndorff (brother)

Professional wrestling career
- Ring name: Terry Orndorff
- Billed height: 5 ft 10 in (178 cm)
- Billed weight: 227 lb (103 kg)
- Billed from: Tampa, Florida, U.S.
- Trained by: Buddy Roberts; Dick Slater; Michael Hayes; Paul Orndorff; Ted DiBiase; Terry Gordy; Tony Charles
- Debut: 1978
- Retired: 1982

Terry Orndorff (born October 7, 1951) is an American retired professional wrestler. He is the younger brother of Paul Orndorff.

== Professional wrestling career ==
Orndorff debuted in late 1978. He spent the early part of his career wrestling primarily in Tennessee for Georgia Championship Wrestling and Southeastern Championship Wrestling, regularly teaming with his brother Paul.

Throughout 1980, Orndorff wrestled for the Oklahoma-based Mid-South Wrestling promotion, where again he occasionally teamed with his brother Paul. In September 1980, he and Junkyard Dog defeated the Fabulous Freebirds for the Mid-South Tag Team Championship. They lost the titles to Ernie Ladd and Leroy Brown the following month. In January 1981, Orndorff teamed with Chief Frank Hill to win the vacant NWA Tri-State Tag Team Championship; the titles were held up in February following a bout against Akbar's Army (Jerry Brown and Ron McFarlane), with Akbar's Army winning the titles in a follow-up match. Orndorff later turned on Junkyard Dog; the two men went on to feud. In July 1981, Orndorff lost to Junkyard Dog in a lights out match in the main event of a show in the Louisiana Superdome.

In August 1981, Orndorff briefly moved to the Texas-based Big Time Wrestling promotion. In October 1981 at Wrestling Star Wars, he teamed with Kerry Von Erich as a substitute for Kevin Von Erich to win the NWA World Tag Team Championship (Texas version), defeating Chan Chung and The Great Kabuki. Orndorff left Big Time Wrestling the following month after a disagreement with Big Time promoter Fritz Von Erich; the titles were awarded to Bill Irwin and Frank Dusek. He returned to Mid-South Wrestling and finished 1981 by resuming his feud with Junkyard Dog. During the feud, he lost a match to Junkyard Dog that obligated him to wear a "yellow mask" for 60 days; Orndorff would "load" the mask to use it as a weapon.

In early-1982, Orndorff was injured in a car accident. He made a brief return to the ring in late-1982, wrestling for the St. Louis Wrestling Club in St. Louis, Missouri, but ultimately retired later that year, returning to his trade as a boilermaker.

== Professional wrestling style and persona ==
Orndorff's finishing move was the airplane spin.

== Championships and accomplishments ==
- Big Time Wrestling
  - NWA World Tag Team Championship (Texas version) (1 time) – with Kerry Von Erich
- Mid-South Wrestling
  - Mid-South Tag Team Championship (1 time) – with Junkyard Dog
  - NWA Tri-State Tag Team Championship (1 time) – with Chief Frank Hill
