= Don Muraco =

American professional wrestler (born 1949)

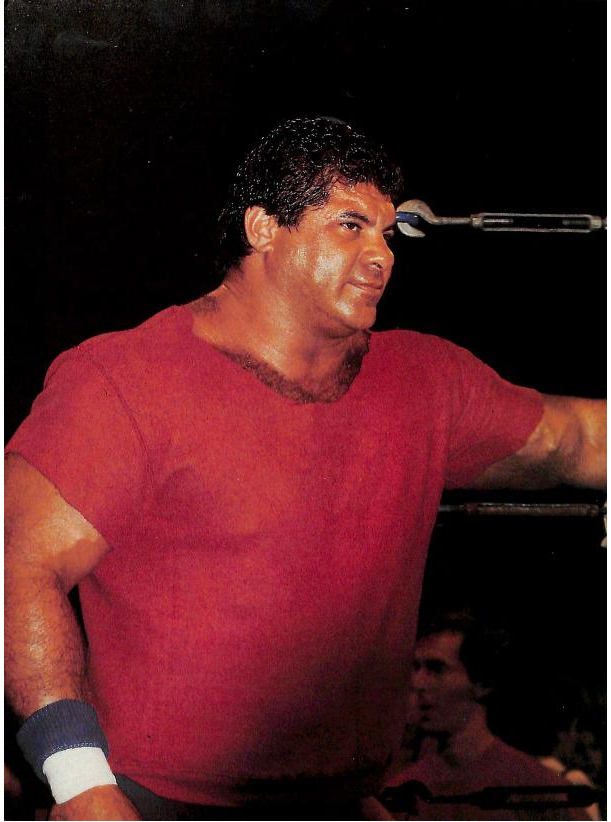
- Muraco in 1988

Personal information
- Born: September 10, 1949 (age 77) Sunset Beach, Hawaii, U.S.
- Spouse: Sharon Muraco
- Children: 3

Professional wrestling career
- Ring name(s): Aka Oni; Don Morrow; Don Muraco; Dr. X Magnificent Muraco
- Billed height: 6 ft 3 in (191 cm)
- Billed weight: 275 lb (125 kg)
- Billed from: Sunset Beach, Hawaii
- Trained by: Tom Andrews; Steve Bolus; Bulldog Bob Brown; Mr. Fuji; Dean Ho; Lonnie Mayne; Bud Ratelle
- Debut: 1970
- Retired: 2005

Donald Thomas Muraco (born September 10, 1949) is an American retired professional wrestler. He is best known for his appearances with the World Wrestling Federation (WWF) from 1981 to 1988, where he held the WWF Intercontinental Heavyweight Championship on two occasions and was crowned the inaugural winner of the King of the Ring tournament in 1985. He was inducted into the WWE Hall of Fame class of 2004 and the Professional Wrestling Hall of Fame in 2014.

== Professional wrestling career ==
=== Early career (1970–1981) ===
Muraco was born at Sunset Beach, Oahu, Hawaii in 1949 and is of Native Hawaiian heritage. A Hawaii state amateur wrestling champion for Punahou School in 1967, Muraco chose professional wrestling over football. He spent the first year of his career learning the ropes in NWA All-Star Wrestling, Pacific Northwest Wrestling, Championship Wrestling from Florida and NWA Hollywood Wrestling before getting his first big break, for Verne Gagne's American Wrestling Association (AWA). Wrestling as a face, he often tag teamed with Jimmy Snuka, against wrestlers such as Larry Hennig, Ivan Koloff and Dusty Rhodes. In 1973, tired of life in Minneapolis, he left the AWA for Roy Shire's San Francisco NWA territory.

In 1974, Muraco moved to Championship Wrestling from Florida (CWF). He was frequently compared to the NWA World Champion Jack Brisco, whom he physically resembled. In a match between the two on May 28, 1974, Muraco reversed Brisco's finishing move, the figure four leglock. Though Muraco lost the match by disqualification, this feat made him a star.

After brief stints in Texas and Georgia Championship Wrestling, Muraco returned to California in 1975 and won his first singles title, the NWA Americas Heavyweight Championship. He then won the San Francisco version of the NWA World Tag Team Championship with Masked Invader #1. In San Francisco, Muraco learned to work as a heel.

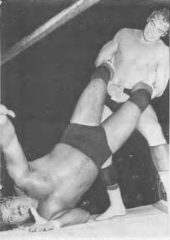
Barry Windham attempts to apply a Boston crab to Muraco during a match in 1980

From 1977 through 1981, Muraco shuttled several more times between Florida, San Francisco and his native Hawaii. In Florida, he was involved in two high-profile angles. In 1979, a masked villain called "The Magnificent M" appeared in the territory. Though it came as little surprise when he was eventually unmasked as Muraco, his bald head shocked the audience. Then, in 1980, he feuded with Barry Windham, in which the bigger and more experienced Muraco piledrove the rookie on the concrete floor. Windham eventually got his revenge, in the process becoming a credible wrestler in the eyes of the fans.

=== World Wrestling Federation (1981–1984, 1985–1988) ===
==== Intercontinental Heavyweight Champion (1981–1984) ====
Muraco debuted in the World Wrestling Federation (WWF) in Allentown, Pennsylvania defeating Steve King on February 24, 1981. Managed by The Grand Wizard, he captured the WWF Intercontinental Heavyweight Championship on June 20, 1981, from Pedro Morales; he lost it to Morales on November 23 in a Texas Death match, capping a bloody feud. That year, Muraco wrestled then WWF Heavyweight Champion Bob Backlund several times, including a 60-minute draw on October 24. He split 1982 between Mid-Atlantic Championship Wrestling (where he partnered with Roddy Piper for a time), Georgia Championship Wrestling (where he also wrestled under a mask as Dr. X) and New Japan Pro-Wrestling (where he wrestled in the annual MSG League tournament), before returning to the WWF that fall.

Now managed by Captain Lou Albano, Muraco regained the Intercontinental Championship from Morales on January 22, 1983. That year, Muraco feuded with Albano's former protégé, Jimmy Snuka. The feud culminated on October 17, in a steel cage match at Madison Square Garden. Snuka lost the match, but afterward dragged Muraco back into the ring and hit his finisher, the "Superfly Splash", from the top of the 15-foot cage. In the crowd at the Garden for this match was future WWE Hall of Famer Mick Foley, the Sandman, Tommy Dreamer, and Bubba Ray Dudley.

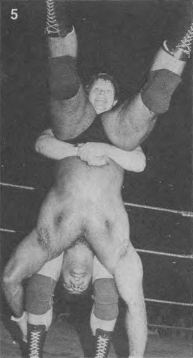
Bob Backlund giving Muraco a piledriver, c. 1982

During his two Intercontinental Championship reigns, Muraco had bloody feuds with Bob Backlund, Tony Atlas and Rocky Johnson. He portrayed an arrogant villain who angrily demanded respect, while engaging in disrespectful behavior himself; in one match, he brought a submarine sandwich to the ring and ate it while dominating his outmatched opponent. Later, he would preface his matches by dedicating his impending finishing move, the piledriver, to either the heel commentator or whomever he was feuding with at the time. Audiences regularly mocked Muraco and his Hawaiian origins with derisive chants of "beach bum". On February 11, 1984, Muraco lost the Intercontinental title to Tito Santana. After a series of unsuccessful rematches, Muraco took a hiatus from WWF in August 1984. He went to NWA Polynesian for a short stint, and also wrestled in Japan.

==== Alliance with Mr. Fuji (1985–1987) ====
Muraco returned to the WWF in 1985, managed by Mr. Fuji. After not wrestling on the card of the first WrestleMania, Muraco headlined three consecutive Madison Square Garden cards against WWF World Heavyweight Champion Hulk Hogan, climaxing in a bloody steel cage match on June 21, which Hogan won. On July 8, Muraco won the first King of the Ring tournament when he pinned The Iron Sheik in the Final. Before defeating the Sheik, Muraco had defeated the Junkyard Dog, Les Thornton and Pedro Morales to reach the Final.

In addition to feuding with Ricky Steamboat for much of the remainder of the year which included hanging Steamboat from the top rope with Steamboat's own karate belt on an episode of WWF Championship Wrestling, Fuji and Muraco debuted Fuji Vice, a series of skits parodying Miami Vice, on Tuesday Night Titans (Fuji General, a parody of the ABC soap General Hospital, followed soon after). In 1986, Muraco allied with Adrian Adonis and Bob Orton Jr. in their feud with Roddy Piper. This led to Orton and Muraco becoming a regular tag team. On March 29, 1987, they lost to the Can-Am Connection (Tom Zenk and Rick Martel) in the opening match of WrestleMania III in front of a reported 93,173 fans at the Pontiac Silverdome. In July 1987, a falling out between Muraco and Orton led to a feud between them and a face turn for Muraco. Muraco won almost every match in the feud, on TV and at house shows, until Orton left the WWF that year.

==== "The Rock" (1987–1988) ====
In a TV taping aired in November 1987, Muraco solidified his face status by saving "Superstar" Billy Graham from a three-on-one beating by Butch Reed, One Man Gang and Slick, and taking Graham as his new manager. Muraco adopted Graham's tie-dye attire and changed his nickname from "Magnificent Muraco" to "The Rock" (although announcer Gorilla Monsoon continued to refer to Muraco by his previous nickname). Muraco replaced Graham on the team led by his former rival Hulk Hogan at the first Survivor Series, and had a good showing at the first Royal Rumble, where he eliminated three wrestlers (tied for second most with "Hacksaw" Jim Duggan) and was one of the final four competitors. He later reached the quarterfinals of the WWF World Heavyweight Championship tournament at WrestleMania IV. In his final months with the WWF, he feuded with Greg Valentine and lost to Dino Bravo at the inaugural SummerSlam. Muraco had his last match in the WWF against Barry Horowitz in October 1988 on a tour of Italy, but was then fired.

=== Various promotions (1988–1995) ===
After leaving the WWF, Muraco split his time between Stampede Wrestling (where he defeated Makhan Singh to win the North American Heavyweight title), the AWA (where he wrestled AWA World Heavyweight Champion Larry Zbyszko to a double disqualification), All Japan Pro Wrestling, and Herb Abrams' Universal Wrestling Federation (where he feuded with Cactus Jack).

Muraco made his first appearance in Stampede on December 3, 1988, defeating Vokhan Singh at a television taping in Calgary. He was immediately thrust into the North American title picture, and after two unsuccessful attempts in the coming days he defeated Makhan Singh to win the championship on December 9, 1988. For the remainder of the month he successfully defended the title, and while champion then traveled to the American Wrestling Association where he defeated Colonel DeBeers on December 26 in Manitoba.

He opened 1989 by traveling to All Japan, and in his first match on January 2 in Korakuen Hall in Tokyo was placed in a battle royal with Davey Boy Smith, John Tenta, Dynamite Kid, Giant Baba, and others. Muraco would team with Goro Tsurumi, Leo Burke, and Brian Adams during the AJPW Giant Series 1989 tour. He then returned to North America, wrestling Larry Zbyszko to a double disqualification at an AWA TV taping in Milwaukee on January 20, 1989.

Returning to Stampede, he faced Davey Boy Smith on March 24, 1989, and was defeated for the North American championship. Following an unsuccessful attempt to regain the title the following day, Muraco returned to All Japan in May 1989 to participate in the AJPW Super Power Series 1989 tag-team tour, which saw him partner with Mitch Snow, Dick Slater, and Dan Spivey. He also defeated Isamu Teranishi, Isao Takagi, Goro Tsurumi, and Motoshi Okuma in singles competition.

Following an eleven-month sabbatical, Muraco returned to action in New Zealand for a joint World Wrestling Federation / Arena Wrestling Alliance promotion that saw him face and defeat Haku on three separate nights, the first coming on April 7, 1990, in Christchurch, Canterbury. On June 9, 1990, he appeared in the Tri-State Wrestling Alliance's TWA Summer Sizzler event, where he was defeated by his old partner, "Cowboy" Bob Orton.

On December 6, 1990, he made his debut for Herb Abram's growing Universal Wrestling Federation, defeating Terry Cooley on UWF Fury Hour. Muraco would defeat Cactus Jack, The Intern, and Chris Michaels before suffering his first loss of his UWF run on January 12, 1991, when he was defeated by Steve Williams at a house show in West Islip, New York. This was Muraco's only UWF defeat, and he ended his tenure with a double-disqualification loss with Terry Gordy in the quarter finals for the UWF Sportschannel Television title on May 10, 1991.

Following a lengthy sabbatical, Muraco returned to action in the new Eastern Championship Wrestling (ECW) promotion. His first match was a double disqualification loss with King Kaluha on June 23, 1992, in Philadelphia, Pennsylvania. Three months later Muraco defeated ECW Heavyweight Champion Jimmy Snuka at a card on September 30, 1992, in Philadelphia. Muraco successfully defended the ECW championship against Nikolai Volkoff, as well as Snuka in a rematch, while at the same time also venturing that November into the Universal Wrestling Superstars promotion in New York City. Muraco was defeated for the ECW championship on November 16, 1992, by Mr. Sandman (The Sandman).

Muraco then toured Australia with the Wrestling in Australia promotion in March 1993, losing to Junkyard Dog in multiple encounters and being defeated by Jake Roberts for the vacated AWF title. He returned to Eastern Championship Wrestling a month later, joining then-booker Eddie Gilbert's Hot Stuff International stable and forming a tag-team with former rival Jimmy Snuka. On April 3, 1993, he defeated The Sandman to regain the ECW Heavyweight Championship. Muraco successfully retained the title against Tommy Cairo, The Metal Maniac, as well as The Sandman in a rematch.

While still ECW Champion, Muraco made an appearance at World Championship Wrestling on May 23, 1993, where he teamed with Dick Murdoch and Jimmy Snuka against Wahoo McDaniel, Jim Brunzell and Blackjack Mulligan at Slamboree 1993: A Legends' Reunion. He then returned to touring with Eastern Championship Wrestling and was finally defeated for the ECW title by another former rival in Tito Santana on October 1, 1993.

Muraco joined Wrestle Association-R and made his debut on August 25, 1994, defeating Takashi Ishikawa in Tokyo, Japan. He would frequently team with Kendo Nagasaki on this WAR Revolutionary Ignition '94 tour. He returned later in the fall to participate in the WAR WAR-ISM tour, defeating Masanobu Kurisu on November 2, 1994. He again teamed with Nagasaki, but also faced Hiromichi Fuyuki and Nobukazu Hirai in singles matches. Muraco had thirteen matches with the promotion, culminating in a tag loss (with Ai Oni) to Animal Hamaguchi and Ryuma Go on December 4, at WAR Mega Power in Sumo Hall.

Muraco then appeared in the All-Star Wrestling Federation, defeating Greg Valentine at events in May 1995.

=== Retirement (1995–present) ===
After retiring from the ring in 1995, Muraco returned to Hawaii. In 2003, he co-founded Hawai'i Championship Wrestling with local TV producer Linda Bade, which ran from 2003 to 2008. He was the storyline commissioner of Hawai'i Championship Wrestling until 2006. He also worked as a longshoreman. On May 22, 1998, he returned to wrestling for one night where he lost to The Honky Tonk Man at Northern Wrestling States Wrestler Alliance. He also returned to wrestling in Hawaii where he defeated the Kodiak Bear at Hawaiian Islands Wrestling Federation on January 9, 1999.

In 2004, Muraco was inducted into the WWE Hall of Fame class of 2004 by Mick Foley, who, like Tommy Dreamer, Bubba Ray Dudley and D-Von Dudley, credits the 1983 steel cage match between Muraco and Snuka at Madison Square Garden (which he attended) as his inspiration for becoming a wrestler. He managed his son, Joe, in WXW. On August 27, 2005, he teamed with Joe to defeat another father and son team, Bob and Brad Armstrong, at WrestleReunion 2. In 2007, Muraco inducted his former manager, Mr. Fuji, into the WWE Hall of Fame class of 2007.

== Personal life ==
Muraco was adopted by an Italian-Portuguese family, but he is of half Irish, quarter Hawaiian, and quarter German descent.

Muraco resides in Hawaii with his wife Sharon. He has three children, one of whom, Joe, followed in his footsteps as a professional wrestler. His nephew DeZhaun Stribling is a wide receiver for the San Francisco 49ers.

== Championships and accomplishments ==
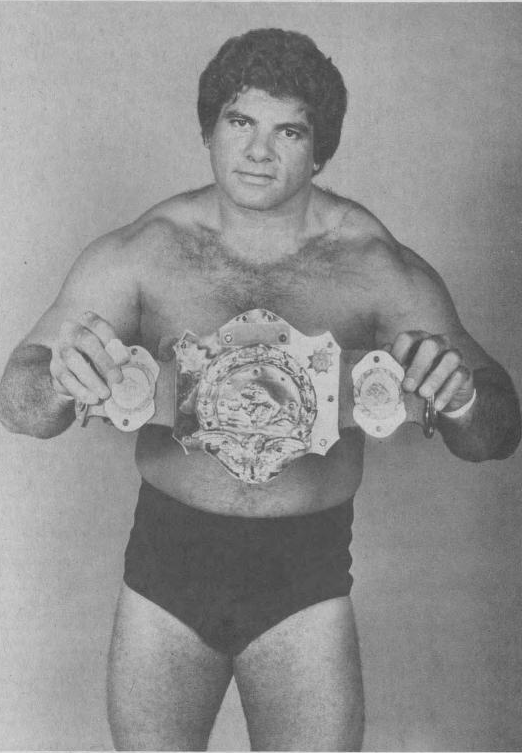
Muraco with the WWF Intercontinental Heavyweight Championship, c. 1981

- 50th State Big Time Wrestling
  - NWA Pacific International Championship (1 time)
- All-California Championship Wrestling
  - ACCW Heavyweight Championship (1 time)
- Championship Wrestling from Florida
  - NWA Florida Heavyweight Championship (1 time)
  - NWA Florida Television Championship (1 time)
  - NWA United States Tag Team Championship (Florida version) (1 time) - with Jos LeDuc
- Eastern Championship Wrestling
  - ECW Heavyweight Championship (2 times)
- Georgia Championship Wrestling
  - NWA Macon Tag Team Championship (1 time) - with Robert Fuller
- NWA Hollywood Wrestling
  - NWA Americas Heavyweight Championship (1 time)
- NWA New Zealand
  - NWA British Empire/Commonwealth Heavyweight Championship (1 time)
- NWA San Francisco
  - NWA United States Heavyweight Championship (San Francisco version) (1 time)
  - NWA World Tag Team Championship (San Francisco version) (1 time) - with Invader #1
- Pacific Coast Championship Wrestling
  - PCCW Heavyweight Championship (1 time)
- Professional Wrestling Hall of Fame
  - Class of 2014
- Pro Wrestling Illustrated
  - PWI ranked him #50 of the top 500 singles wrestlers of the "PWI Years" in 2003
  - PWI ranked him #102 of the top 500 singles wrestlers of the "PWI 500" in 1993
- Stampede Wrestling
  - Stampede North American Heavyweight Championship (1 time)
- World Wrestling Federation/Entertainment
  - WWF Intercontinental Heavyweight Championship (2 times)
  - King of the Ring (1985)
  - WWE Hall of Fame (Class of 2004)
- Wrestling Observer Newsletter
  - Best Heel (1981)
  - Most Impressive Wrestler (1981)
