= Ernie Roth =

American professional wrestling manager (1926–1983)

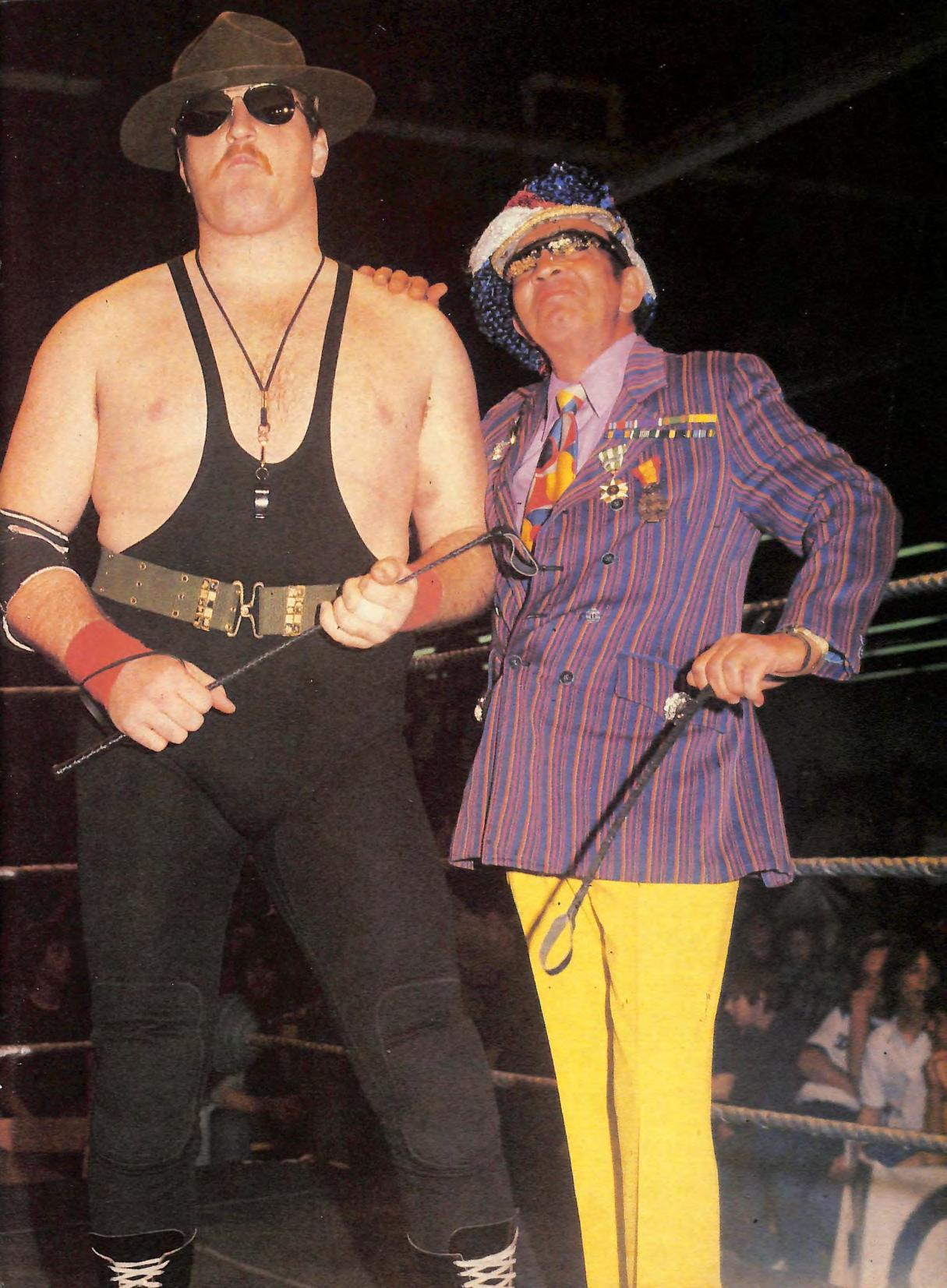
- Roth (right) as The Grand Wizard with Sgt. Slaughter, 1982

Personal information
- Born: Irwin Jacob Roth; August 30, 1926 Canton, Ohio, U.S.
- Died: October 12, 1983 (aged 57) Fort Lauderdale, Florida, U.S.
- Cause of death: Heart attack

Professional wrestling career
- Ring name(s): Abdullah Farouk; Armstrong K. Armstrong Kay; The Grand Wizard; The Grand Wizard of Wrestling; J. Wellington Radcliffe; Mr. Clean
- Billed height: 5 ft 7 in (170 cm)
- Billed weight: 130 lb (59 kg)
- Billed from: Fort Lauderdale, Florida
- Debut: 1958

Irwin Jacob "Ernie" Roth (August 30, 1926 – October 12, 1983), known by the ring names The Grand Wizard of Wrestling and Abdullah Farouk, was an American professional wrestling manager. Not a regular wrestler himself due to his small stature, he was noted for his flamboyant outfits, including sequined jackets, wraparound sunglasses, and brightly colored turbans decorated with jewels and feathers. He was inducted into the WWE Hall of Fame in 1995.

== Professional wrestling career ==
=== Early career ===
Ernie Roth got his start in the entertainment business as a disc jockey. He was discovered by Jim Barnett who helped Roth get into the wrestling industry. He became involved in professional wrestling as a manager in the late 1950s in Detroit-based territories. Roth first worked under the names "Mr. Clean" and "J. Wellington Radcliffe."

=== Abdullah Farouk (1958–1974) ===
Roth portrayed "Abdullah Farouk", the heel (villainous) manager of The Sheik. He frequently appeared on the Toronto and Detroit wrestling circuit, where local announcer Lord Athol Layton would usually refer to him as "The weasel, Abdullah Farouk".

Sporting a fez, Farouk took great pains in trying to control his madman protégé. But he also carved a niche for himself as a deceitful, underhanded character who insulted US fans whenever he had a chance. Farouk was a pioneer of "manager interference", as he physically would attempt to alter a match's outcome in the Sheik's favor. This sort of interference was rare at the time.

=== The Grand Wizard (1971–1983) ===
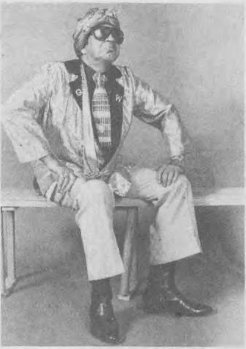
The Grand Wizard in 1982

Roth began a stint with the World Wide Wrestling Federation (WWWF) in the 1970s, where he became known as The Grand Wizard. Roth, who was Jewish, reportedly took the name "The Grand Wizard" as a snub to the white supremacy organization the Ku Klux Klan, whose leaders were called Grand Wizard. He also replaced his fez with a turban.

Almost immediately after arrival in 1971, the Wizard managed Blackjack Mulligan and "Beautiful Bobby" Harmon. He later led Mr. Fuji and Prof. Toru Tanaka to two reigns with the WWWF World Tag Team Championship. A year later, the Wizard led Stan Stasiak to victory over Pedro Morales for the WWF Championship in Philadelphia on December 1, 1973. The Wizard guided a second protégé, Superstar Billy Graham, to the very same championship on April 30, 1977, when Graham overcame Bruno Sammartino in Baltimore. On February 20, 1978, Bob Backlund dethroned Graham at Madison Square Garden. The Wizard made it his duty to gain revenge on Backlund, sending charges such as Don Muraco, Ken Patera and Greg Valentine after him.

The Wizard managed the first WWF Intercontinental Champion Pat Patterson, and later Patera (who defeated Patterson for the title in April 1980 after the Wizard and Patterson parted ways) and Muraco to the same championship. Other protégés of the Wizard included "Beautiful Bobby" Harmon, Killer Kowalski, "Crazy" Luke Graham, Sgt. Slaughter, "Big Cat" Ernie Ladd, Ox Baker, "Cowboy" Bob Orton and The Masked Superstar, or Masked Demon from parts unknown.

== Other media ==
Roth on many occasions (when out of character and greasepaint mustache) co-hosted the syndicated Big Time Wrestling show with fellow announcer Bob Finnegan until 1969 when the hosting duties went to Lord Athol Layton.

== Personal life ==
Roth was revealed posthumously to be homosexual, although some claim they were aware of his sexual orientation during his lifetime. He was the godfather of protégé Don Muraco's daughter. His parents were Evrum (Edward) Roth and Rizel (Rose) Stern. According to the autobiography of former WWE referee and wrestler Dangerous Danny Davis, Roth was also in charge of helping get the ring to all shows. The position was eventually taken over by Davis himself after Roth's death.

== Death ==
On October 12, 1983, Roth died of a heart attack at his Fort Lauderdale, Florida home at the age of 57. In 1995, Roth was inducted into the WWF Hall of Fame as part of the class of 1995 by his friend and protégé Sgt. Slaughter.

== Legacy ==
Later WWF manager The Wizard claimed to be in communion with Roth's spirit.

== Awards and accomplishments ==
- Pro Wrestling Illustrated
  - Editors' Award (1983)
  - Manager of the Year (1973, 1977)
- Ring Chronicle Professional Wrestling Hall of Fame
  - Inductee
- World Wrestling Federation
  - WWF Hall of Fame (Class of 1995)

== See also ==
- List of Jewish professional wrestlers
