= American Wrestling Federation =

Professional wrestling promotion

- Acronym: AWF
- Founded: 1994
- Defunct: 1996
- Style: Professional wrestling
- Headquarters: Chicago, Illinois, Minnesota
- Founder: Paul Alperstein
- Owner: Paul Alperstein

The American Wrestling Federation (AWF) was a professional wrestling federation founded by Paul Alperstein active from 1994 to 1996. The promotion was based in Chicago, Illinois, but held shows in many other eastern states of the United States. The AWF used the European wrestling format of timed rounds, 4 minute rounds with judges and points, in the vein of boxing matches.

The company had two championships, the AWF Heavyweight Championship, and the AWF Tag Team Championship. The last AWF Heavyweight Champion, Tito Santana, actually defended the championship after the AWF closed in 1996. The company closed for financial reasons, producing a syndicated show but failing to gain a following.

== History ==
Paul Alperstein, a promoter from Chicago, founded the AWF in 1994 and was on-air president of the company. The company announced its launch at a press conference at the Official All Star Café in Times Square featuring Missy Hyatt, Santana, and Sgt. Slaughter.

He intended to reintroduce rules as a significant part of professional wrestling. This was carried out by the use of timed rounds and judges in every match, which is similar to the rules of professional wrestling in Europe and as well as boxing.

Each round was four minutes long with a one-minute rest period between rounds. Title bouts were scheduled for twelve rounds while all other fights were scheduled for three. One referee and two judges were assigned to each match. The winner of each round was decided by both the judges' scorecards and the referee's scorecard. If a match lasted the full amount of scheduled rounds, the winner was declared as whoever had the majority of points on each of the three scorecards.

Another rule implemented was that throwing opponents over the top rope resulted in an automatic disqualification.

Only a few wrestlers in this organization had experience in European wrestling, most notably England's Chris Adams and "Mr. Ambassador" Steve Casey (not to be confused with the World Class wrestler of the same name). Wrestlers such as Tito Santana, Bob Orton, Jr., Jim Powers, Koko. B Ware, Johnny Gunn and Greg Valentine, headlined AWF's events between the mid-1990s.

Santana and Orton were seemingly considered the top wrestlers in the company, with Santana presented as the top babyface and Orton as the top heel.

The AWF used tournaments for its titles, each wrestler would advance in the tournament by defeating the respective opponent, like in a normal match. Points scored in a card during a tournament.

Jim Brunzell was named AWF commissioner by Alperstein in hopes that he would make sure the above rules were enforced. Brunzell even refereed the first match for the AWF Championship in 1994, between Orton and Santana.

The promotion held several house shows and was building towards a pay per view event, but it closed in December 1996 for financial reasons.

A full decade later, Santana defended the AWF championship belt at a November 2006 National Championship Wrestling event in York, Pennsylvania against former AWF wrestler Salvatore Sincere. The storyline was that Santana had dodged Sincere during their AWF days in the mid-1990s and Santana agreed to put the belt on the line against Sincere. Santana won the match for his last title defense, albeit unofficial.

== Warriors of Wrestling ==
In 1995, the company introduced a program called Warriors of Wrestling for syndication. The initial run consisted of footage shot from 1994 to 1995. The program resurfaced throughout the United States in late 1996 with new episodes. The announce team consisted of Mick Karch as announcer and Terry Taylor as color commentator. Taylor was replaced by Lord Alfred Hayes in 1996. Ken Resnick handled interview segments. Resnick was eventually replaced by Missy Hyatt in 1996.

In 2005, the entire run of 1995 episodes was released as a 4-disc DVD set by Highland Entertainment. It is unknown when or if a second volume will be released with the remaining episodes as there were many not in the DVD set.

As of January 2006, reruns can be seen on Europe's Clear Television via the cluster of Astra satellites at 19.2° east.

== Championships ==
#	Order in reign history
Reign	The reign number for the specific set of wrestlers listed
Event	The event in which the title was won
Successful defenses	The number of successful defenses the champion had during her reign
—	Used for vacated reigns so as not to count it as an official reign
N/A	The information is not available or is unknown
+	Indicates the current reign is changing daily

=== AWF Heavyweight Championship ===
#	Wrestler	Reign	Date	Days held	Location	Event	Successful defenses	Notes
1	Tito Santana	1	November 29, 1994	676	Chicago, IL	Live Event	3	Defeated Bob Orton Jr. in a tournament final to become the inaugural champion.
2	Bob Orton Jr.	1	October 5, 1995	0	Fort Lauderdale, FL	Live Event	0	
3	Tito Santana	2	October 5, 1996	55	Fort Lauderdale, FL	Live Event	0	
—	Retired	—	November 29, 1996	—	N/A	N/A	—	

=== AWF Tag Team Championship ===
#	Wrestler	Reign	Date	Days held	Location	Event	Successful defenses	Notes
1	Tommy Rich and Greg Valentine	1	May 21, 1995	558	Chicago, IL	Live Event	3	Defeated Koko B. Ware and Tony Atlas in a tournament final to become the inaugural and sole champions.
—	Retired	—	November 29, 1996	—	N/A	N/A	—	

== See also ==
- List of independent wrestling promotions in the United States
